= Earl Spencer (title) =

Earldom in the Peerage of Great Britain

Earldom of Spencer
- Coat of arms
- Creation date: 1 November 1765; 261 years ago
- Created by: George III
- Peerage: Peerage of Great Britain
- First holder: John Spencer, 1st Viscount Spencer
- Present holder: Charles Spencer, 9th Earl
- Heir apparent: Louis Spencer, Viscount Althorp
- Remainder to: 1st Earl's heirs male of the body lawfully begotten
- Subsidiary titles: Viscount Althorp; Viscount Spencer; Baron Spencer of Althorp
- Seats: Althorp; Spencer House

Earl Spencer is a title in the Peerage of Great Britain that was created on 1 November 1765, along with the title Viscount Althorp, of Althorp in the County of Northampton, for John Spencer, 1st Viscount Spencer. He was a member of the prominent Spencer family and a great-grandson of the 1st Duke of Marlborough. Previously, he had been created Viscount Spencer, of Althorp in the County of Northampton, and Baron Spencer of Althorp, of Althorp in the County of Northampton, on 3 April 1761.

The future 6th Earl Spencer was created Viscount Althorp, of Great Brington in the County of Northampton, on 19 December 1905 in the Peerage of the United Kingdom. Diana, Princess of Wales, was the youngest of three daughters of the 8th Earl Spencer. William, Prince of Wales, and Prince Harry, Duke of Sussex, are grandsons of the 8th Earl Spencer.

== Estates and residences ==
=== Country seat ===
The family seat is Althorp in Northamptonshire.

=== Landed estates ===
In the 1883 edition of John Bateman's The Great Landowners of Great Britain and Ireland, John Spencer, 5th Earl Spencer's estates were recorded as spanning 27,185 acres across England, including 16,800 acres in Northamptonshire, 3,392 acres in Warwickshire, 3,017 acres in Hertfordshire, 2,533 acres in Norfolk, 771 acres in Buckinghamshire, 670 acres in Leicestershire, and 2 acres in Surrey, which produced a combined annual income of £46,764.

The Althorp estates continues to include the civil parish of Althorp, in West Northamptonshire, which comprises approximately 13,000 acres (5,300 ha). (Note: Sources differ on the exact size of the estate, but most state 13,000 or 14,000 acres. The official website claims 13,000 acres, but Paprocki and others mention 14,000.) The family's estate includes significant land holdings in other parts of the country, including the village of North Creake in Norfolk.

=== London residences ===
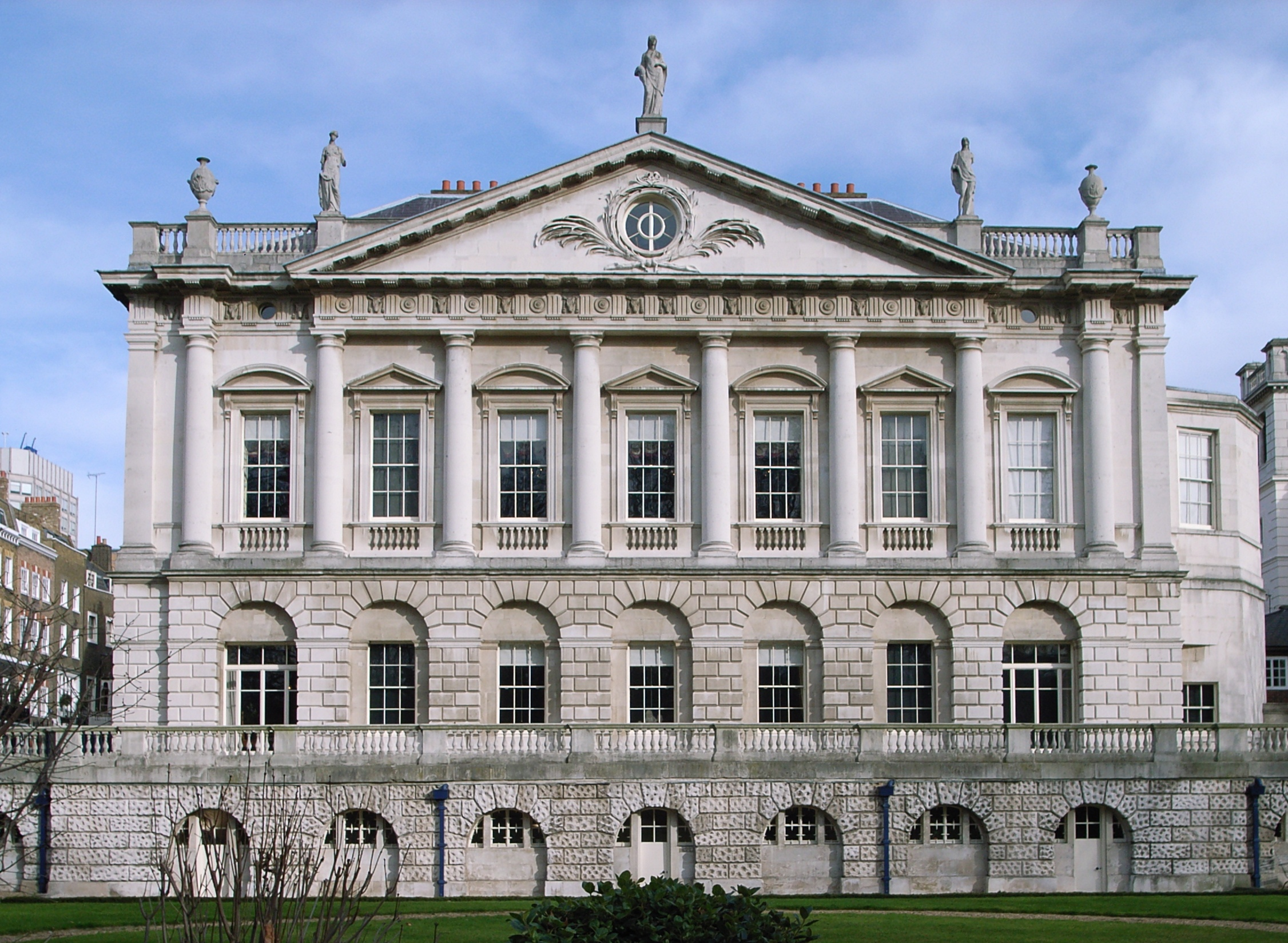
Spencer House, the principal London residence of the Earls Spencer from the 18th century until the early 20th century

The family owns the freehold of Spencer House at 27 St James's Place in St James's, London. The house was commissioned in 1756 by John Spencer, later 1st Earl Spencer, and his wife Georgiana Poyntz, who required a London residence suitable for entertaining during the social season. Construction continued until 1766, initially under the architect John Vardy and subsequently James "Athenian" Stuart, whose work gave the principal interiors some of the earliest fully developed neoclassical decoration in England. The house is a Grade I listed building.

Successive Earls and Countesses Spencer used Spencer House as their London home and as a setting for political and society entertaining. The house remained in regular family occupation through the 18th and 19th centuries, although from the 1880s the decline in landed income led the Spencers increasingly to let it to private tenants. The 6th Earl Spencer briefly resumed occupation between 1914 and 1916 before offering the house rent-free to the government for wartime use. The 7th Earl Spencer and his family returned in 1923 and undertook alterations intended to restore the State Rooms to a more Georgian appearance, but financial pressures forced the family to leave again in 1926. Spencer House was leased to the Ladies Army and Navy Club from 1927, and the Spencers did not subsequently resume residence there.

Despite ceasing to occupy the house, the family retained ownership. During the Second World War the 7th Earl ordered the removal of a number of original architectural fittings from the State Rooms for safekeeping at Althorp, while the building itself was used by the government. Following several decades of commercial occupation, the lease was acquired in 1985 by the J. Rothschild group of companies, headed by Jacob Rothschild, 4th Baron Rothschild, which undertook a major restoration of the house and its interiors. The restored Spencer House was formally reopened in 1990 by Diana, Princess of Wales, a daughter of the 8th Earl Spencer. The freehold remains in the ownership of the Spencer family.

Adjoining Spencer House at 28 St James's Place is a late-18th-century house which traditionally served as a dower house associated with the Spencer property and was occasionally used by members of the family as a London residence when Spencer House itself was let.

== Coat of arms ==
The coat of arms of the family is as follows: Quarterly argent and gules, in the second and third quarters a fret or, over all on a bend sable, three escallops of the first. The crest, emerging from the coronet, is a griffin's head argent, gorged with a bar gemelle gules between two wings expanded of the second. The supporters are: Dexter, a griffin per fess ermine and erminois, gorged with a collar sable, the edges flory-counter-flory, and chained of the last, on the collar, three escallops argent; sinister, a wyvern erect on his tail ermine, collared and chained as the griffin. The motto is Dieu defend le droit (French: God protects the right).

== Earls Spencer (1765) ==
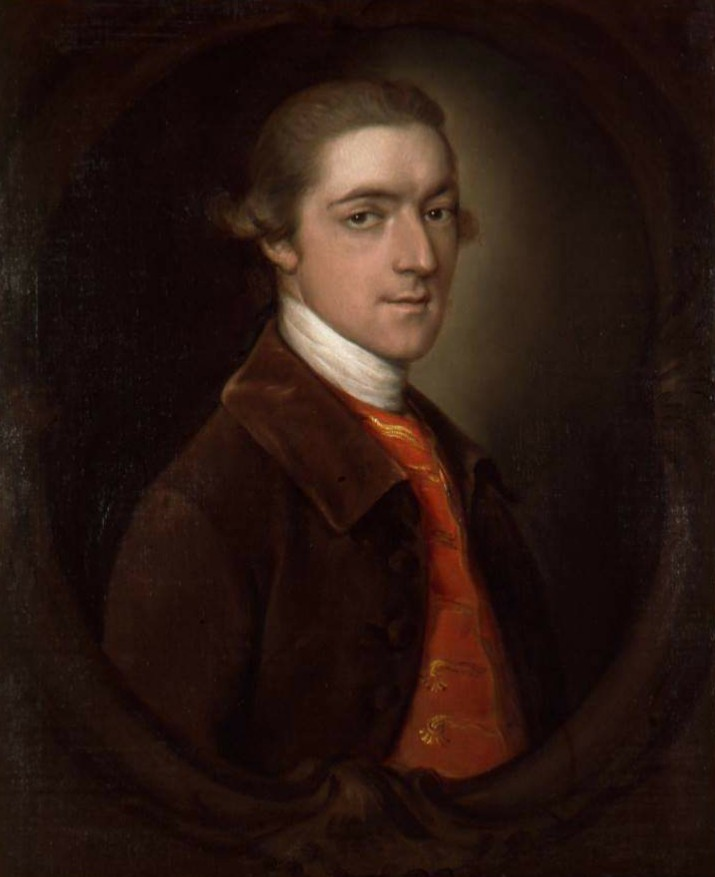
John Spencer, 1st Earl Spencer, by Thomas Gainsborough

- John Spencer, 1st Earl Spencer (1734–1783)
- George John Spencer, 2nd Earl Spencer (1758–1834)
- John Charles Spencer, 3rd Earl Spencer (1782–1845)
- Frederick Spencer, 4th Earl Spencer (1798–1857)
- John Poyntz Spencer, 5th Earl Spencer (1835–1910)
- Charles Robert Spencer, 6th Earl Spencer (1857–1922)
- Albert Edward John Spencer, 7th Earl Spencer (1892–1975)
- Edward John Spencer, 8th Earl Spencer (1924–1992)
- Charles Edward Maurice Spencer, 9th Earl Spencer (b. 1964)

The heir apparent is the present holder's son Louis Frederick John Spencer, Viscount Althorp (b. 1994).

== Family tree ==
This is a continuation of the Spencer/Spencer-Churchill family tree for the Althorp branch of the Spencers found in the Spencer family article.

Family tree of Spencer family of Althorp

Spencer-Churchill family tree of the Dukes of Marlborough, Earls of Sunderland and Earls Spencer

Baron Spencer of Wormleighton, 1603
Robert Spencer; 1570–1627; 1st Baron Spencer of Wormleighton
John Spencer; 1590–1610	William Spencer; 1592–1636; 2nd Baron Spencer of Wormleighton	John Churchill; 1600–1673
Earl of Sunderland (2nd creation), 1643
Henry Spencer; 1620–1643; 1st Earl of Sunderland, 3rd Baron Spencer of Wormleighton	Winston Churchill; 1620–1688
Lord Churchill of Eyemouth (Scotland), 1682; Baron Churchill of Sandridge, 1685; Earl of Marlborough (2nd creation), 1689; Duke of Marlborough and Marquess of Blandford, 1702
Robert Spencer; 1640–1702; 2nd Earl of Sunderland, 4th Baron Spencer of Wormleighton	John Churchill; 1650–1722; 1st Duke of Marlborough, Marquess of Blandford, Earl of Marlborough, Lord Churchill of Eyemouth, and Baron Churchill of Sandridge	King James VII and II; 1633–1701	Arabella Churchill; 1648–1730
Francis Godolphin; 1678–1766; Earl of Godolphin	Henrietta Churchill; 1681–1733; 2nd Duchess of Marlborough, Marchioness of Blandford, Countess of Marlborough, and Baroness Churchill of Sandridge	Charles Spencer; 1675–1722; 3rd Earl of Sunderland, 5th Baron Spencer of Wormleighton	Anne Churchill; 1683–1716	John Churchill; 1686–1703; Styled Marquess of Blandford	James FitzJames; 1670–1734; Duke of Berwick	Henry FitzJames; 1673–1702; Duke of Albemarle (Jacobite)	Henry Waldegrave, Baron Waldegrave; 1661–1689	Henrietta FitzJames; 1667–1730
William Godolphin; 1700–1731; Styled Marquess of Blandford	Robert Spencer; 1701–1729; 4th Earl of Sunderland, 6th Baron Spencer of Wormleighton	Charles Spencer; 1706–1758; 3rd Duke of Marlborough, Marquess of Blandford, Earl of Marlborough, and Baron Churchill of Sandridge, 5th Earl of Sunderland, 7th Baron Spencer of Wormleighton	John Spencer; 1708–1746	Dukes of Berwick (Jacobite)	Dukes of Albemarle (Jacobite)	James Waldegrave, Earl Waldegrave; 1684–1741
Viscount Spencer and Baron Spencer of Althorp, 1761; Earl Spencer, 1765
George Spencer; 1739–1817; 4th Duke of Marlborough, Marquess of Blandford, Earl of Marlborough, and Baron Churchill of Sandridge, 6th Earl of Sunderland, 8th Baron Spencer of Wormleighton	John Spencer; 1734–1783; 1st Earl Spencer, Viscount Spencer, and Baron Spencer of Althorp	James Waldegrave, Earl Waldegrave; 1715–1763
Baron Churchill of Wychwood, 1815
George Spencer-Churchill; 1766–1840; 5th Duke of Marlborough, Marquess of Blandford, Earl of Marlborough, and Baron Churchill of Sandridge, 7th Earl of Sunderland, 9th Baron Spencer of Wormleighton	Francis Almeric Spencer; 1779–1845; 1st Baron Churchill of Wychwood	George Spencer; 1758–1834; 2nd Earl Spencer, Viscount Spencer, and Baron Spencer of Althorp	Hugh Seymour; 1759–1801	Anne Horatia Waldegrave; 1762–1801
George Spencer-Churchill; 1793–1857; 6th Duke of Marlborough, Marquess of Blandford, Earl of Marlborough, and Baron Churchill of Sandridge, 8th Earl of Sunderland, 10th Baron Spencer of Wormleighton	Francis George Spencer; 1802–1886; 2nd Baron Churchill of Wychwood	Augustus Spencer; 1807–1893	John Spencer; 1782–1845; 3rd Earl Spencer, Viscount Spencer, Baron Spencer of Althorp	Horace Beauchamp Seymour; 1791–1851
John Winston Spencer-Churchill; 1822–1883; 7th Duke of Marlborough, Marquess of Blandford, Earl of Marlborough, and Baron Churchill of Sandridge, 9th Earl of Sunderland, 11th Baron Spencer of Wormleighton	Georgiana Poyntz; 1799–1851	Frederick Spencer; 1798–1857; 4th Earl Spencer, Viscount Spencer, and Baron Spencer of Althorp	Adelaide Horatia Seymour; 1825–1877
Viscount Althorp, 1905
George Charles Spencer-Churchill; 1844–1892; 8th Duke of Marlborough, Marquess of Blandford, Earl of Marlborough, and Baron Churchill of Sandridge, 10th Earl of Sunderland, 12th Baron Spencer of Wormleighton	Randolph Henry Spencer-Churchill; 1849–1895	Augustus Spencer; 1851–1912	John Poyntz Spencer; 1835–1910; 5th Earl Spencer, Viscount Spencer, and Baron Spencer of Althorp	Charles Robert Spencer; 1857–1922; 6th Earl Spencer, Viscount Spencer, and Baron Spencer of Althorp, 1st Viscount Althorp
Viscount Churchill, 1902
Charles Richard John Spencer-Churchill; 1871–1934; 9th Duke of Marlborough, Marquess of Blandford, Earl of Marlborough, and Baron Churchill of Sandridge, 11th Earl of Sunderland, 13th Baron Spencer of Wormleighton	Winston Leonard Spencer Churchill; 1874–1965; Prime Minister of the United Kingdom; 1940–1945 and 1951–1955	Victor Albert Francis Charles Spencer; 1864–1934; 1st Viscount Churchill, 3rd Baron Churchill of Wychwood
(Descendants of Winston Churchill)
John Albert William Spencer-Churchill; 1897–1972; 10th Duke of Marlborough, Marquess of Blandford, Earl of Marlborough, and Baron Churchill of Sandridge, 12th Earl of Sunderland, 14th Baron Spencer of Wormleighton	Victor Alexander Spencer; 1890–1973; 2nd Viscount Churchill, 4th Baron Churchill of Wychwood	Richard Spencer; 1888–1956	Albert Spencer; 1892–1975; 7th Earl Spencer, Viscount Spencer, and Baron Spencer of Althorp, 2nd Viscount Althorp
John George Vanderbilt Henry Spencer-Churchill; 1926–2014; 11th Duke of Marlborough, Marquess of Blandford, Earl of Marlborough, and Baron Churchill of Sandridge, 13th Earl of Sunderland, 15th Baron Spencer of Wormleighton	Victor George Spencer; 1934–2017; 3rd Viscount Churchill, 5th Baron Churchill of Wychwood	Richard Spencer; 1926–2020; 6th Baron Churchill of Wychwood	Edward John Spencer; 1924–1992; 8th Earl Spencer, Viscount Spencer, and Baron Spencer of Althorp, 3rd Viscount Althorp
Viscountcy Churchill extinct, 2017
Charles James Spencer-Churchill b. 1955; 12th Duke of Marlborough, Marquess of Blandford, Earl of Marlborough, and Baron Churchill of Sandridge, 14th Earl of Sunderland, 16th Baron Spencer of Wormleighton	Michael Spencer b. 1960; 7th Baron Churchill of Wychwood	David Anthony Spencer b. 1970; Heir Presumptive to Wychwood	King Charles III b. 1948	Diana Frances Spencer; 1961–1997	Charles Edward Maurice Spencer b. 1964; 9th Earl Spencer, Viscount Spencer, and Baron Spencer of Althorp, 4th Viscount Althorp
George John Godolphin Spencer-Churchill b. 1992; Styled Marquess of Blandford	William, Prince of Wales b. 1982	Harry, Duke of Sussex b. 1984	Louis Frederick John Spencer b. 1994; Styled Viscount Althorp
Orlando Spencer-Churchill b. 2026; Styled Earl of Sunderland

== Arms ==
Coat of arms of Earl Spencer
Coronet A Coronet of an Earl Crest Out of a Ducal Coronet Or a Griffin's Head Azure gorged with a Bar Gemelle Gules between two Wings expanded of the second Escutcheon Quarterly Argent and Gules, in the 2nd and 3rd quarters a Fret Or, over all on a Bend Sable three Escallops of the first Supporters Dexter: A Griffin per fess Ermine and Erminois gorged with a Collar Sable the edges flory-counterflory and chained of the last and on the Collar three Escallops Argent; Sinister: A Wyvern Erect on his tail Ermine similarly collared and chained Motto Dieu Defend Le Droit (God defends the right)

== See also ==
- Spencer family
- Spencer Gulf
- Spencer (clothing)

== Sources ==
- Paprocki, Sherry Beck (July 2009). Diana, Princess of Wales: Humanitarian. Infobase Publishing. ISBN 978-1-60413-463-6.
