= Lady Churchill (disambiguation) =

Clementine Churchill, Baroness Spencer-Churchill (1885–1977), was the wife of Winston Churchill.

Lady Churchill may also refer to:

- Frances FitzRoy, Baroness Churchill, daughter of Augustus FitzRoy, 3rd Duke of Grafton and wife of Francis Spencer, 1st Baron Churchill
- Jane Spencer, Baroness Churchill (1826–1900), wife of Francis Spencer, 2nd Baron Churchill
- Lady Randolph Churchill (1854–1921), mother of Winston Churchill
