= Francis Spencer =

Francis Spencer may refer to:

- Francis Spencer, 1st Baron Churchill (1779–1845), British peer and Whig politician
- Francis Spencer, 2nd Baron Churchill (1802–1886), British peer and diplomat
