= Baron Churchill =

Baron Churchill or Lord Churchill may refer to:

- Lord Churchill of Eyemouth (Peerage of Scotland), created in 1682 for John Churchill, 1st Duke of Marlborough, and extinct 1722
- Baron Churchill of Sandridge (Peerage of England), created in 1685 for John Churchill and extant as subsidiary title of Duke of Marlborough
- Baron Churchill (Peerage of the United Kingdom), created in 1815 for Francis Spencer, 1st Baron Churchill, and currently extant
