= Jane Spencer, Baroness Churchill =

British noble (1826–1900)

The Right Honourable The Lady Churchill VA
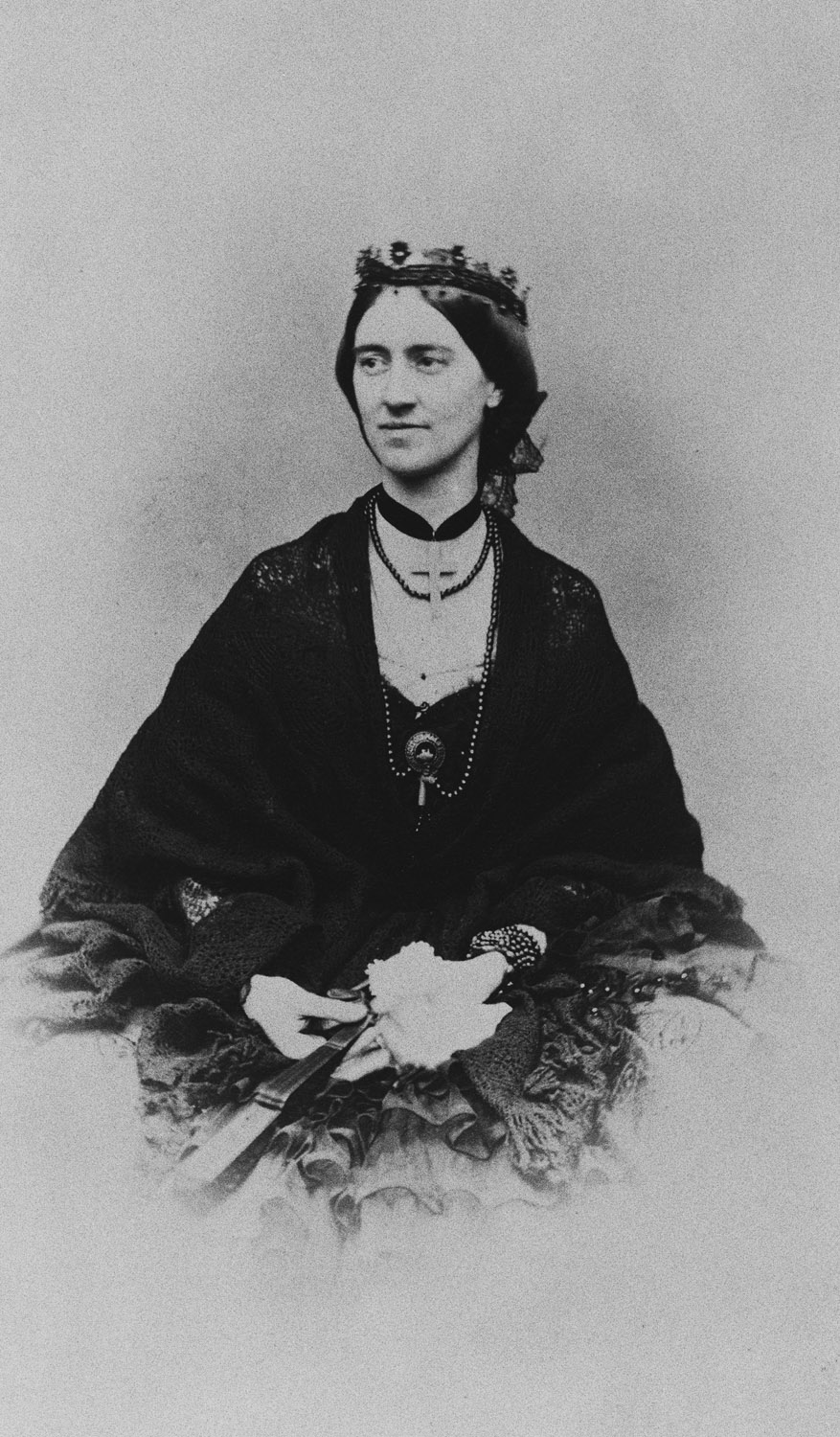
- Born: Jane Conyngham; 1 June 1826
- Died: 24 December 1900 (aged 74); Osborne House, Isle of Wight
- Buried: Finstock, Oxfordshire
- Noble family: Spencer family
- Spouse: Francis Spencer, 2nd Baron Churchill (m. 1849; died 1886)
- Issue: Victor Spencer, 1st Viscount Churchill
- Father: Francis Conyngham, 2nd Marquess Conyngham
- Mother: Lady Jane Paget
- Occupation: Lady of the Bedchamber

Jane Spencer, Baroness Churchill VA (née Lady Jane Conyngham; 1 June 1826 – 24 December 1900) was an English aristocrat and companion of Queen Victoria.

From 1854 to her death, Churchill served as a Lady of the Bedchamber to Victoria; this made her the longest serving member of the queen's personal household. Her role mainly extended to accompanying the queen on her travels and acting as her intermediary in the royal household. Despite her long service, little is known of the details of Lady Churchill's personal life and time serving the queen, for she left no journals or memoirs. Her marriage to Francis Spencer, 2nd Baron Churchill produced one son.

== Early life and marriage ==
Lady Jane Conyngham was born on 1 June 1826, the eldest daughter of the Earl of Mount Charles (later 2nd Marquess Conyngham) and his wife Lady Jane Paget, daughter of the 1st Marquess of Anglesey. The younger Jane had two brothers and three sisters. On 19 May 1849, Lady Jane Conyngham married Francis Spencer; he had succeeded his father as 2nd Baron Churchill in 1845. Baron Churchill spent his early years serving in the diplomatic service, and later commanded the Oxfordshire Yeomanry Cavalry. He died on 24 November 1886. They had one son, Victor Spencer (later 1st Viscount Churchill), who was born on 23 October 1864.

== Lady of the Bedchamber ==
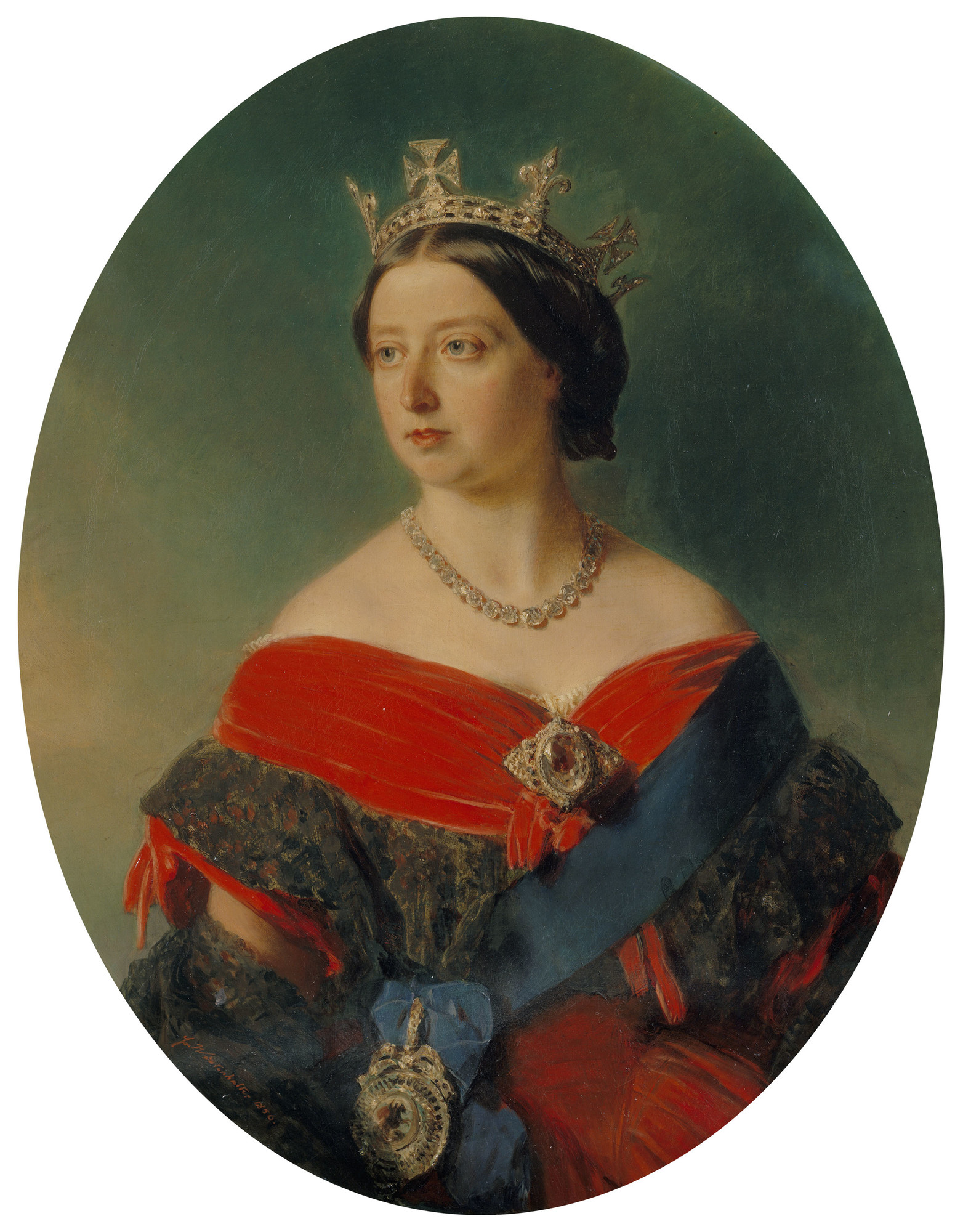
Queen Victoria in 1856, two years after Lady Churchill's appointment

Churchill was a devoted friend and trusted advisor of Queen Victoria. Churchill's father had been one of the men in attendance on Victoria's predecessor, William IV, and in 1854 Churchill was appointed as a Lady of the Bedchamber, a position that required her to accompany Victoria to ceremonies and public engagements. Churchill was to hold the position until her death forty-six years later, making her the longest-serving member of the queen's personal household. She was a member of the Royal Order of Victoria and Albert, Third Class.

The author Greg King describes Churchill as "undoubtedly the most powerful and influential" of the queen's female appointees. One of her frequent roles was to deliver Victoria's messages to members of the household. The historian K. D. Reynolds writes that Churchill and other certain ladies "were used extensively by the queen in the regulation of the household, and by members of the household who wanted the queen's personal approval for a course of action". After Prince Albert's death, the widowed queen sought to remove herself from low-level interactions in her household. She preferred instead to direct her ladies to act as intermediaries to other members of the household, particularly men. These messages often concerned minor breaches in etiquette; hence Churchill was unpopular, though still respected. However, Reynolds does not believe her role extended beyond the royal household.

In 1858, Queen Victoria asked Churchill to accompany her eldest daughter Princess Victoria to Berlin, upon her marriage to Prince Frederick of Prussia. The historian Helen Rappaport attributes this newly assigned role to the Queen "no doubt [being] impress[ed] with Churchill's discretion and dependability". The Queen wished that Churchill help Vicky acclimatise to life in the Kronprinzenpalais, and to send back her observations of even the smallest details of life there. Churchill stayed with the princess for several weeks, reporting back to the queen on conditions. One source of displeasure was the hot temperature of the rooms, which Churchill described as "dreadful".

Despite Churchill's long service and closeness to the queen, Victoria could be ruthless and demanding of her servant. Rappaport writes of Churchill's personality, "[She] proved to be adept at self-effacement; she performed her duties with a combination of dignity, good humour, and vigilance". Churchill regularly travelled with Queen Victoria on her Scottish voyages, particularly to Balmoral Castle; these trips were often undertaken in the face of harsh weather conditions, with Jane venturing outside for fresh air with the Queen. Members of the household endured cold rooms at the Scottish castle. One trip involved Victoria and Albert journeying in disguise to Grantown – the couple referred to themselves as "Lord and Lady Churchill", while Jane Churchill accompanied them as "Miss Spencer", with a small party. At Balmoral, Churchill frequently read to the queen from novels such as Jane Austen's Pride and Prejudice and George Eliot's The Mill on the Floss. In February 1872, Churchill was present on a drive from Regent's Park with the Queen when they were confronted by Arthur O'Connor, a teenage Irish nationalist. John Brown noticed the boy and prevented him from coming near the monarch.

Churchill suffered from heart problems for several years, and died on Christmas Eve 1900 of heart failure in her sleep while staying at Osborne House on the Isle of Wight. She was found the following morning in her bed. Her body was transported to the mainland on 28 December, and was buried on 29 December 1900 at Finstock, Oxfordshire. Queen Victoria's personal physician, Sir James Reid, at first withheld the news of Churchill's death as he feared it would upset the frail and labile monarch. When finally told, the Queen was shocked and barely ate. She wrote, "The loss to me is not to be told... and that it should happen here is too sad". Queen Victoria died within a month of Churchill's death.

The details of Churchill's personal life and time serving the Queen are little known, as she left no journals or memoirs; Victoria did not permit her ladies-in-waiting to keep a diary.
