= Victor Spencer, 1st Viscount Churchill =

British peer and courtier (1864–1934)

Major The Right Honourable The Viscount Churchill GCVO JP
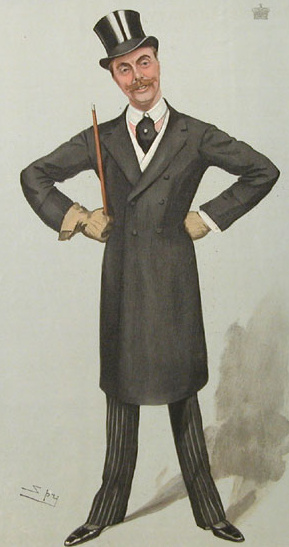
- The Viscount Churchill by Leslie Ward, 1904.

Lord-in-waiting
- In office 1889–1892
- Preceded by: The Earl of Hopetoun
- Succeeded by: The Lord Playfair
- In office 1895–1905
- Preceded by: The Lord Camoys
- Succeeded by: The Lord Denman

Personal details
- Born: Victor Albert Francis Charles Spencer; 23 October 1864
- Died: 3 January 1934 (aged 69)
- Spouses: Lady Verena Maud Lowther (m. 1887; div. 1927) Christine McRae Sinclair (m. 1927)
- Children: 6
- Parent(s): Francis Spencer, 2nd Baron Churchill; Jane Spencer, Baroness Churchill

Major Victor Albert Francis Charles Spencer, 1st Viscount Churchill GCVO JP (23 October 1864 – 3 January 1934), known as the Hon. Victor Albert Spencer until 1886 and as The Lord Churchill between 1886 and 1902, was a British peer and courtier. He was from the Spencer family.

== Early life ==
Spencer was born at 32, Albemarle Street, London, the son of Francis Spencer, 2nd Baron Churchill, and his wife Jane (née Conyngham). He was a Page of Honour to Queen Victoria from 1876 to 1881, and in 1886 he succeeded to his father's title of Baron Churchill. He was a grandson of Francis Spencer, 1st Baron Churchill.

Educated at Eton College and the Royal Military College, Sandhurst, he was commissioned into the Coldstream Guards in 1884 as a lieutenant, staying in the Guards until 1889.

== Career ==
On 12 July 1905 he was commissioned as a Major in the part-time Oxfordshire Imperial Yeomanry (Queen's Own Oxfordshire Hussars), which his father and grandfather had commanded, and in which several of his Spencer-Churchill kinsmen also served. He was later a Lieutenant-Colonel in the Territorial Army Reserve and served as a temporary Colonel in Home Defence from 1915 to 1918.

For Edward VII's coronation he served as lord chamberlain, and at the coronation of George V, he was Master of the Robes. He was acting Master of the Buckhounds between 1900 and 1901 during the tenure of Charles Cavendish, the office holder, while Cavendish was in South Africa.

Spencer was a Lord in Waiting from 1889 to 1892 and 1895 to 1905 in both of Salisbury's governments and was created Viscount Churchill, of Rolleston, in the County of Leicester, on 15 July 1902 (it had already been announced in the Coronation Honours list the previous month that he would be created a Viscount).

=== Business career ===
He was chairman and director of several transport companies, including the Great Western Railway 1908–34 and was the longest serving chairman of the company. He was also a director of the British India Steamship Company, P&O and the Grand Union Canal.

== Personal life ==
Lord Churchill married Lady Verena Maud Lowther, daughter of Henry Lowther, 3rd Earl of Lonsdale, at Cottesmore, Rutland, on 1 January 1887. They had four children:

- Hon. Victor Almeric Lancelot Spencer (1888–1888), who died young.
- Victor Alexander Spencer, 2nd Viscount Churchill (1890–1973), who married Katherine Emily Beaven, daughter of Robert Beaven, 6th Premier of British Columbia, in 1916. After her death, he married Joan Black, daughter of Joseph Baron Black, in 1949.
- Hon. Victoria Ivy Louise Spencer (1897–1946), who married Capt. Hon. Cecil Henry Brassey, son of Maj. Henry Brassey, 1st Baron Brassey, and Lady Violet Gordon-Lennox (daughter of Charles Gordon-Lennox, 7th Duke of Richmond), in 1920.
- Hon. Ursula Spencer (1901–1934), who married Lt.-Col. Alick Frederick Tod, son of Col. George Russell Tod, in 1928.

When she wished to divorce Lord Churchill, King Edward forbade it, to avoid a scandal among his social circle. Instead she disappeared in 1909 taking their son, aged 19, and two daughters, aged 13 and 8, with her. Lord Churchill placed an anonymous advertisement seeking information about his family's whereabouts, but the scandal soon became public. In 1927 he obtained a divorce on the grounds of desertion. Churchill married as his second wife Christine McRae Sinclair, daughter of William Sinclair. They had two children:

- Hon. Sarah Faith Georgina Spencer (1931–2015), who married Richard John Palmer, son of Reginald Howard Reed Palmer, in 1951.
- Victor George Spencer, 3rd Viscount Churchill (1934–2017)

Lord Churchill died of pneumonia on 3 January 1934.

== Honours ==
British honours

- GCVO: Knight Grand Cross of the Royal Victorian Order – 9 November 1902 – 1902 Birthday Honours list, invested by King Edward VII at Sandringham House the same day.

Foreign honours

- Kingdom of Prussia: Knight 1st class of the Order of the Crown – 1899 – in connection with the visit of Emperor Wilhelm II to the United Kingdom.
- The Red Eagle of the Kingdom of Prussia
- The Order of the Crown of Italy
- The Order of the Redeemer of Greece
- The Order of Jesus Christ of Portugal

== Arms ==
Coat of arms of Victor Spencer, 1st Viscount Churchill
Crest Out of a ducal Coronet or, a griffin’s head between two Wings expanded argent, gorged with a bar gemel gules, armed gold. Escutcheon Quarterly: 1st & 4th, quarterly argent and gules, in the second and third quarters charged with a fret or, over all on a bend sable with three escallops argent (Spencer); 2nd & 3rd, Sable, a lion rampant argent, on a canton of the last, a cross gules (Churchill). Supporters Dexter: A griffin wings erect per fess argent and or gorged with a collar of the last, thereon three escallops sable, line reflexed over the back also or. Sinister: A wyvern the wings erect gules, collared as the dexter. Motto Dieu defend le droit (God defend the right). Orders Royal Victorian Order (Knight Grand Cross - GCVO)

Court offices
Preceded by Victor Biddulph	Page of Honour; 1876–1881	Succeeded by Percy Cust
Preceded by New creation	His Majesty's Representative at Ascot; 1901–1934	Succeeded by The Lord Hamilton of Dalzell
Political offices
Preceded by The Earl of Hopetoun	Lord-in-waiting; 1889–1892	Succeeded by The Lord Playfair
Preceded by The Lord Camoys	Lord-in-waiting; 1895–1905	Succeeded by The Lord Denman
Peerage of the United Kingdom
New creation	Viscount Churchill; 1902–1934	Succeeded by Victor Spencer
Preceded by Francis Spencer	Baron Churchill; 1886–1934	Succeeded by Victor Spencer
