= Spencer family =

Aristocratic family in the United Kingdom

Spencer Spencer-Churchill
- Noble family
- Country: England, Wales
- Founded: 1469; 557 years ago
- Founder: John Spencer
- Current head: James Spencer-Churchill, 12th Duke of Marlborough
- Seat: Blenheim Palace
- Titles: Princess of Wales; Duke of Marlborough; Earl of Sunderland; Earl Spencer; Viscount Churchill; Viscount Althorp; Baron Spencer of Wormleighton; Baronet of Yarnton; Baronet of Offley; Prime Minister of the United Kingdom
- Connected families: British royal family; Windsor; Mountbatten-Windsor; Churchill; Cavendish
- Motto: Dieu défend le droit (French for 'God defends the right')
- Estates: Althorp; Spencer House; Wormleighton Manor
- Cadet branches: Spencers of Althorp; Spencer-Churchill

The Spencer family is a noble and aristocratic British family. From the 16th century, its members have held numerous titles, including the dukedom of Marlborough, the earldoms of Sunderland and Spencer, and the barony of Churchill. Two prominent members of the family during the 20th century were Winston Churchill and Diana, Princess of Wales.

== History ==
=== Descent and claims ===
The original coat of arms of the family

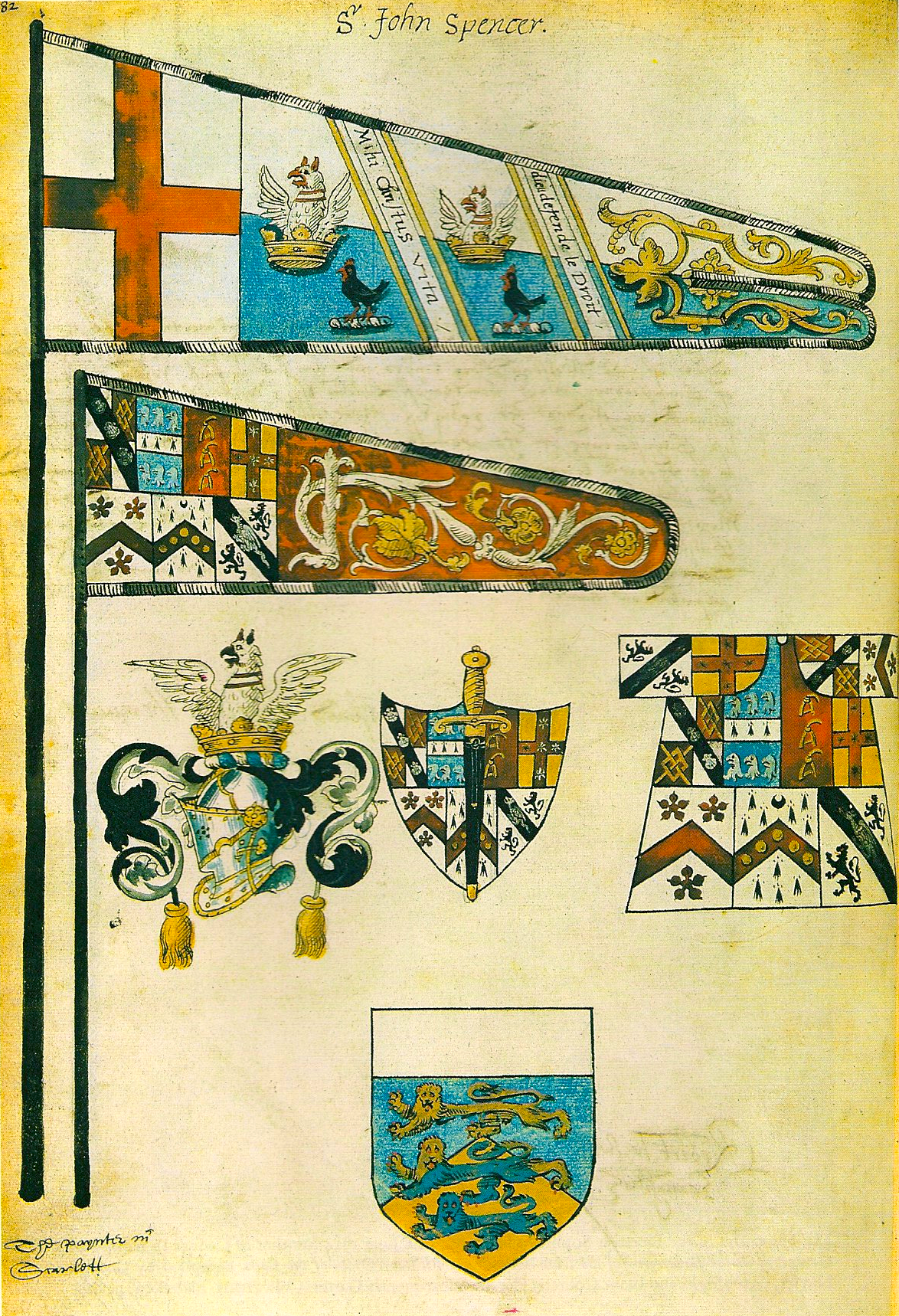
The funeral honours of John Spencer (died 1599), showing both the "sea-mew" arms and the Despencer arms later used by the family

The house was founded in the 15th century by Henry Spencer (died c. 1478), from whom all members descend. In the 16th century, the claim arose that the Spencers were a cadet branch of the older house of Despencer, though this theory has since been debunked, in particular by historian J. Horace Round in his essay The Rise of the Spencers. The Spencers were granted a coat of arms in 1504, consisting of an ermine fess between six sea-mews' heads, but they later abandoned this in about 1595 for a modified version of the Despencer arms. Round argued that the Despencer descent was fabricated by Richard Leigh, a corrupt Clarenceux King of Arms. Citing Round, The Complete Peerage dismissed the alleged Despencer descent as an "elaborate imposture" which "is now incapable of deceiving the most credulous."

=== Rise to wealth ===
A close relative of Henry Spencer (died c. 1478) was John Spencer, who in 1469 had become feoffee (trustee) of Wormleighton Manor in Warwickshire and a tenant at Althorp in Northamptonshire in 1486. His nephew, Sir John Spencer (died 1522), first made a living by trading in livestock and other commodities and eventually saved enough money to purchase both the Wormleighton and Althorp lands. Wormleighton was bought from Sir William Cope in 1506. The manor house was completed in 1512. In 1508, Spencer also purchased the estate of Althorp with its moated house and several hundred acres of farmland. He had grazed sheep here from the 1480s. Impressed by the quality of the land, he eventually bought it and rebuilt the house in 1508. At that time, his estate and mansion in Warwickshire were considerably larger, and the house in Wormleighton was four times the size of Althorp. In 1511, he made further purchases to acquire the villages of Little Brington and Great Brington as well their parish church of St Mary the Virgin, from Thomas Grey, 2nd Marquess of Dorset. By putting down roots at Althorp, Spencer provided what was to become a home for the next 19 generations. In 1519, he was knighted by King Henry VIII, died three years later and was buried in the new family chapel at Great Brington.

The Spencers rose to opulent prominence during the 16th century. Sir John Spencer's grandson Sir John Spencer (d. 1586) was a Knight of the Shire for Northamptonshire. The Spencers' administration of their Northamptonshire and Warwickshire estates was admired and often emulated by gentlemen all over England. Sheep from their pastures were purchased for breeding and it is probable that the family's material success and production as gentlemen farmers was rarely equalled in the century.

In the late 16th century, the latter Sir John Spencer's grandson Sir Robert Spencer (1570–1627) represented Brackley in Parliament. In 1601, he was made a Knight of the Garter, and created Baron Spencer, of Wormleighton, in the Peerage of England in 1603. During the reign of King James I he was reputed to be the richest man in England. The humble origins of the Spencers as sheep farmers once caused a heated exchange of words between wealthy yet then upstart Spencers with the more established Howards whose FitzAlan ancestors had been the Earls of Arundel since the 13th century. During a debate in the House of Peers, Lord Spencer was speaking about something that their great ancestors had done when suddenly the Earl of Arundel cut him off and said "My Lord, when these things you speak of were doing, your ancestors were keeping sheep". Lord Spencer then instantly replied, "When my ancestors as you say were keeping sheep, your ancestors were plotting treason."

Robert Spencer, 1st Baron Spencer, was succeeded in his peerage and estates by his eldest surviving son, William. He had previously represented Northamptonshire in Parliament. Two of his sons received additional peerages: His eldest son, Henry (1620–1643), succeeded as 3rd Baron Spencer in 1636 and was created Earl of Sunderland in the Peerage of England in 1643. The younger son, Robert (1629–1694), sat in the House of Commons from 1660 to 1679 and was created Viscount Teviot in the Peerage of Scotland in 1685.

The senior branch of the Spencers (later known as the Spencer-Churchill family) is currently represented by Jamie Spencer-Churchill, 12th Duke of Marlborough, direct descendant via the eldest male-line of Sir John Spencer, who was knighted by King Henry VIII in 1519 while the cadet branch of the family, the Spencers of Althorp, who descend via the male-line from the younger son of the 3rd Earl Sunderland, is represented by Charles Spencer, 9th Earl Spencer.

=== Spencer, later Spencer-Churchill ===
Robert Spencer, 2nd Earl of Sunderland, was Lord President of the Council from 1685 to 1688 and a Knight of the Garter. His son Charles, 3rd Earl of Sunderland, was Lord-Lieutenant of Ireland, Lord Privy Seal, Secretary of State for both the Northern and Southern Departments, Lord President of the Council, First Lord of the Treasury and a Knight of the Garter. His second wife was Lady Anne Churchill, the second daughter of the distinguished soldier John Churchill, 1st Duke of Marlborough. After Churchill's death in 1722, the Marlborough titles first passed to his eldest daughter Henrietta (1681–1733), then to Anne's second son, Charles. After the death of his elder brother, Robert, in 1729, Charles Spencer had already inherited the titles of 4th Earl of Sunderland and Baron Spencer of Wormleighton as well as the Spencer family estates. In 1733, he succeeded to the Churchill family estates and titles and became the 3rd Duke of Marlborough as well as a Knight of the Garter, while the Spencer estates in Bedfordshire, Northamptonshire (including Althorp) and Warwickshire passed to his younger brother John (1708–1746).

In 1815, Francis Spencer, the younger son of George Spencer, 4th Duke of Marlborough, was created Baron Churchill, of Wychwood in the County of Oxford, in the Peerage of the United Kingdom. In 1902, his grandson, the 3rd Baron, was created Viscount Churchill, of Rolleston in the County of Leicester, also in the Peerage of the United Kingdom.

In 1817, George Spencer, 5th Duke of Marlborough, obtained permission to assume and bear the additional surname of Churchill in addition to his own surname of Spencer, in order to perpetuate the name of his illustrious great-great-grandfather. At the same time he received Royal Licence to quarter his paternal arms of Spencer with the coat of arms of Churchill. The modern Dukes of Marlborough thus originally bore the surname "Spencer". The double-barrelled surname of "Spencer-Churchill" as used since 1817 has remained in the family to this day, though some members have preferred to style themselves merely "Churchill". The 7th Duke of Marlborough was the paternal grandfather of Sir Winston Churchill (1874–1965), the British prime minister. The latter's widow, Clementine (1885–1977), was created a life peeress in her own right as Baroness Spencer-Churchill in 1965.

The family seat of the Dukes of Marlborough is Blenheim Palace in Woodstock, Oxfordshire. Most Spencer-Churchills are interred in the churchyard of St Martin's Church, Bladon, a short distance from the palace; only the Dukes and Duchesses are buried in the Blenheim Palace chapel.

=== Spencer, of Althorp House ===
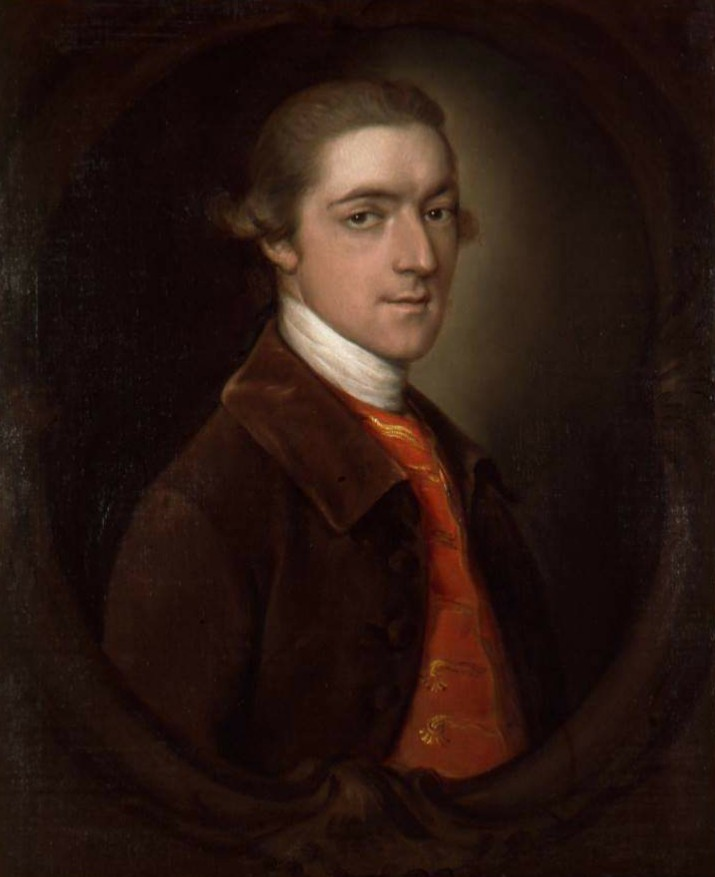
John Spencer, 1st Earl Spencer, by Thomas Gainsborough

In 1761, John Spencer (1734–1783), a grandson of the Charles Spencer, 3rd Earl of Sunderland, was created Baron Spencer of Althorp and Viscount Spencer in the Peerage of Great Britain by King George III. In 1765, he was further created Viscount Althorp and Earl Spencer, also in the Peerage of Great Britain. In 1755, he had privately married Margaret Poyntz (1737–1814) in his mother's dressing room at Althorp. They had five children, including the 2nd Earl Spencer, who later became Home Secretary from 1806 to 1807 and a Knight of the Garter. His older son, the 3rd Earl Spencer was Chancellor of the Exchequer under Lord Grey and Lord Melbourne from 1830 to 1834. The 2nd Earl's youngest son George (1799–1864) converted from Anglicanism to the Roman Catholic Church, became a priest and took the name of Father Ignatius of St Paul. He worked as a missionary and is a candidate for beatification. His older brother, who eventually became the 4th Earl Spencer, was a naval commander, courtier and Whig politician. He initially served in the Royal Navy and fought in the Napoleonic Wars and the Greek War of Independence, eventually rising to the rank of Vice-Admiral, and was made a Knight of the Garter in 1849. His son, the 5th Earl Spencer, who was known as the "Red Earl" because of his distinctive long red beard, was a close friend of prime minister William Ewart Gladstone. He served twice as Lord Lieutenant of Ireland and was made a Knight of the Garter in 1864. He was succeeded in 1910 by his half-brother, the 6th Earl Spencer, who had been made Viscount Althorp, of Great Brington in the County of Northamptonshire, in the Peerage of the United Kingdom, in 1905 and served as Lord Chamberlain from 1905 to 1912. He became a Knight of the Garter in 1913, and was succeeded in the earldom and estates by his son, the 7th Earl Spencer, in 1922. His son, the 8th Earl Spencer, succeeded to the earldom and estates in 1975. He married Frances Ruth Roche in 1954 and had a daughter, Diana, who married Prince Charles in 1981.

The family seat of the Earl Spencer is Althorp in Northamptonshire, their traditional burial place is the parish church of St Mary the Virgin Church, Great Brington. The family estate includes significant land holdings in other parts of the country, including the village of North Creake in Norfolk.

== Members of the family ==
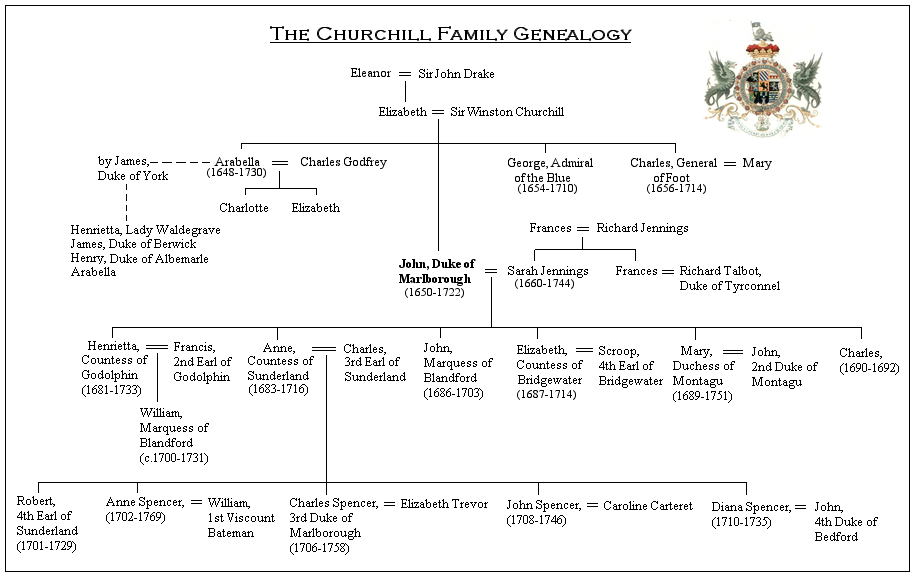
The Duke of Marlborough's genealogy. With no surviving male heir, his daughter Henrietta became the 2nd Duchess of Marlborough. On her death in 1733, her nephew Charles (by Anne Churchill) became the 3rd Duke of Marlborough.

=== Spencer Knights ===
- Sir John Spencer, Kt. of Snitterfield & Wormleighton (1447–1522) married Isabel, daughter of Sir Walter Graunt, of Snitterfield
- Sir William Spencer, Kt. of Wormleighton & Althorp (1483–1532) married Susan, daughter of Sir Richard Knightley, of Fawsley, Northants
- Sir John Spencer, Kt. of Wormleighton & Althorp (1524–1586) married Katherine, daughter of Sir Thomas Kitson, of Hengrove, Suffolk
- Sir John Spencer, Kt. (1546–1600) married Mary, daughter of Sir Robert Catlyn, of Berne, Dorset
- Sir Robert Spencer (1570–1627), was made 1st Baron Spencer

=== Spencer Baronets ===
This now extinct line descended from two younger sons of Sir John Spencer (1524–1586) and his wife Katherine Kitson:

- Their third son William was a landowner in Yarnton, Oxfordshire; his son Thomas was created Baronet of Yarnton in 1611.
- Their fourth son Richard was the ambassador of James I to the Dutch Republic; his son, John, was a landowner in Great Offley, Hertfordshire and was created Baronet of Offley in 1627.

=== Barons Spencer ===
- Robert Spencer, 1st Baron Spencer (1570–1627), married Margaret, daughter of Sir Francis Willoughby (1547–1596), Kt.
- William Spencer, 2nd Baron Spencer (1591–1636), married Penelope, daughter of Henry Wriothesley, 3rd Earl of Southampton
- Henry Spencer, 3rd Baron Spencer (1620–1643), royalist in the English Civil War, was made 1st Earl of Sunderland

=== Earls of Sunderland ===
- Henry Spencer, 1st Earl of Sunderland (1620–1643), royalist in the English Civil War
- Robert Spencer, 2nd Earl of Sunderland (1640–1702), politician
- Charles Spencer, 3rd Earl of Sunderland (1675–1722), politician
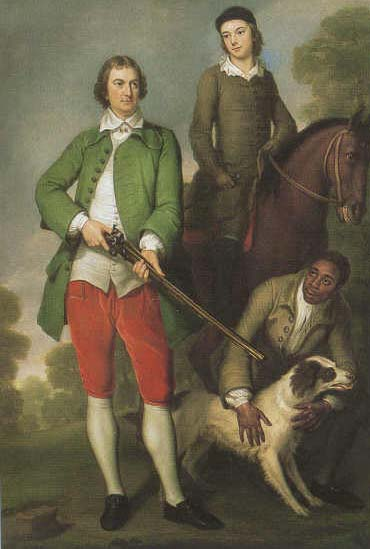
- Hon, John Spencer, (not to be confused with the 1st Earl Spencer), his only son, and their servant Caesar Shaw.
  Robert Spencer, 4th Earl of Sunderland (1701–1729)
- Charles Spencer, 5th Earl of Sunderland (1706–1758), succeeded his maternal aunt as 3rd Duke of Marlborough

=== Dukes of Marlborough ===
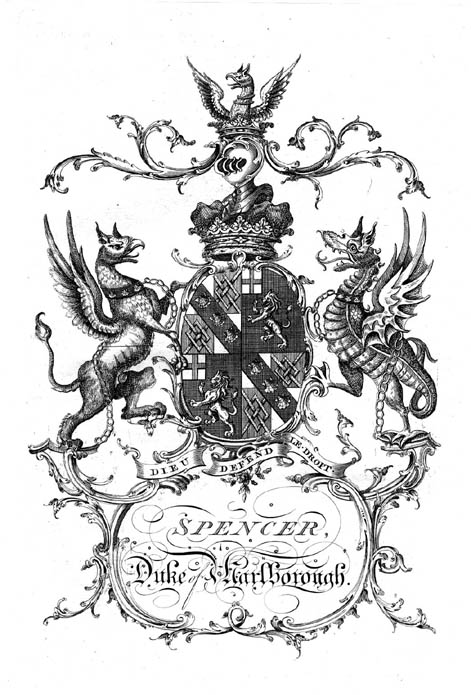
Arms of the Dukes of Marlborough

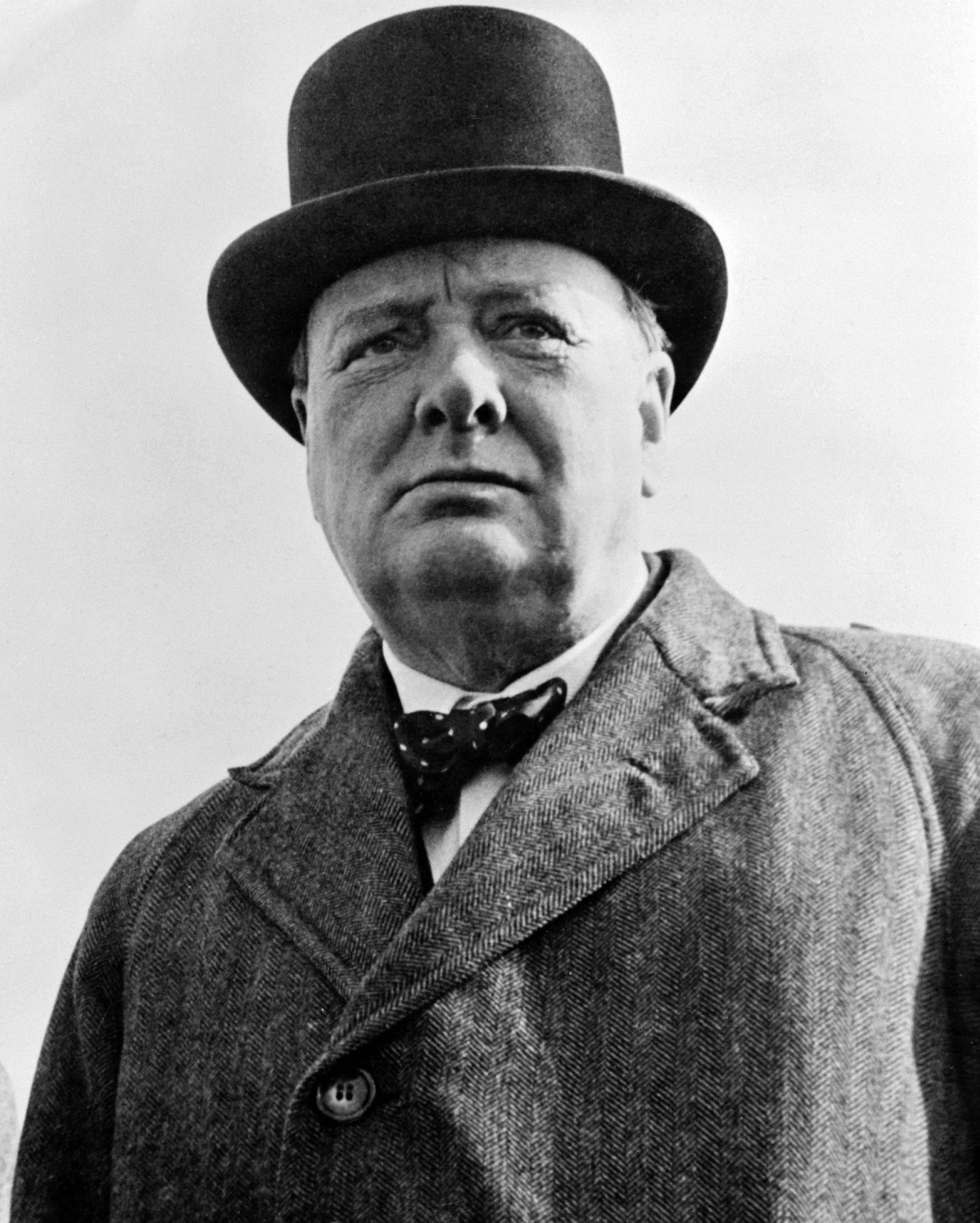
Sir Winston Churchill (1874–1965), British prime minister, grandson of the 7th Duke of Marlborough

- Charles Spencer, 5th Earl of Sunderland, 3rd Duke of Marlborough (1706–1758), general and politician
- George Spencer, 4th Duke of Marlborough (1739–1817), politician
- George Spencer-Churchill, 5th Duke of Marlborough (1766–1840), elder son of the 4th Duke, changed his surname from "Spencer" to "Spencer-Churchill"
- George Spencer-Churchill, 6th Duke of Marlborough (1793–1857), eldest son of the 5th Duke
- John Winston Spencer-Churchill, 7th Duke of Marlborough (1822–1883), eldest son of the 6th Duke (and paternal grandfather of Sir Winston Churchill)
- George Charles Spencer-Churchill, 8th Duke of Marlborough (1844–1892), eldest son of the 7th Duke
- Charles Richard John Spencer-Churchill, 9th Duke of Marlborough (1871–1934), only son of the 8th Duke
- John Albert William Spencer-Churchill, 10th Duke of Marlborough (1897–1972), elder son of the 9th Duke
- John George Vanderbilt Henry Spencer-Churchill, 11th Duke of Marlborough (1926–2014), elder son of the 10th Duke
- Charles James Spencer-Churchill, 12th Duke of Marlborough (born 1955), eldest son of the 11th Duke

=== Barons and Viscounts Churchill ===
This line of the family descends from Francis Spencer, younger son of the 4th Duke of Marlborough. In 1902, his grandson, the 3rd Baron, was created Viscount Churchill. Holders of these titles include

- Francis Almeric Spencer, 1st Baron Churchill (1779–1845)
- Victor Albert Francis Charles Spencer, 1st Viscount Churchill (1864–1934)

=== Earls Spencer ===
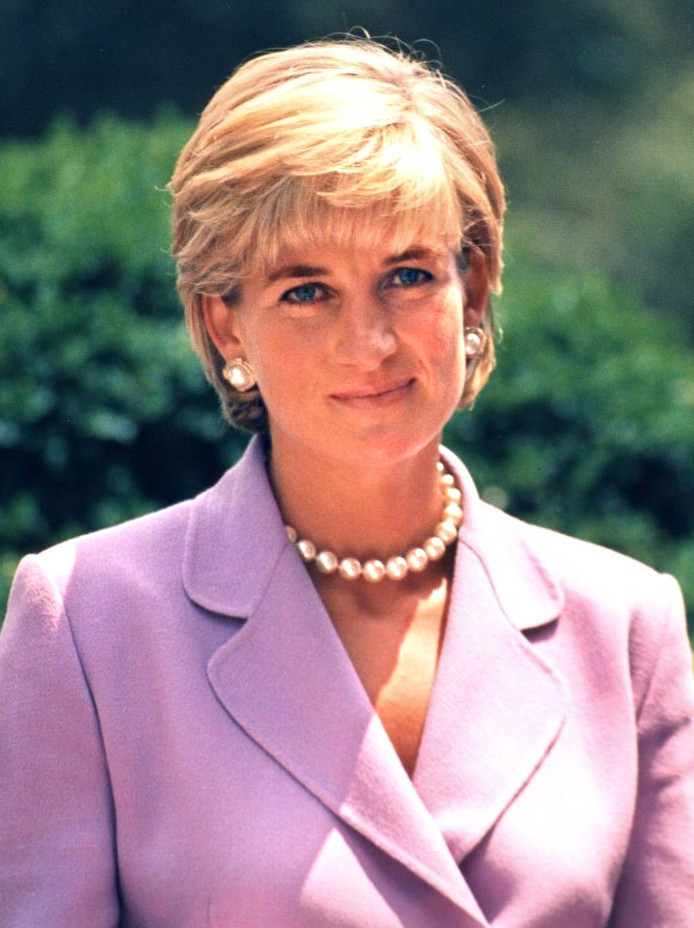
Diana, Princess of Wales (1961–1997), daughter of the 8th Earl Spencer

- John Spencer, 1st Earl Spencer (1734–1783), a grandson of the 3rd Earl of Sunderland through his third and youngest son
- George John Spencer, 2nd Earl Spencer (1758–1834), politician and book collector
- John Charles Spencer, 3rd Earl Spencer (1782–1845), better known as Lord Althorp, politician
- Frederick Spencer, 4th Earl Spencer (1798–1857)
- John Poyntz Spencer, 5th Earl Spencer (1835–1910), politician
- Charles Robert Spencer, 6th Earl Spencer (1857–1922)
- Albert Edward John Spencer, 7th Earl Spencer (1892–1975)
- (Edward) John Spencer, 8th Earl Spencer (1924–1992)
- Charles Edward Maurice Spencer, 9th Earl Spencer (born 1964)

=== Notable marriages ===
- Jane Spencer, daughter of Sir John Spencer of Hodnell, married Sir William Cope
- Jane Spencer, daughter of Sir William Spencer (1483–1558) of Wormleighton and Althorp, married Sir Richard Brydges, Kt.
- Alice Spencer (1559–1637), daughter of Sir John Spencer (1524–1586), married Ferdinando Stanley, 5th Earl of Derby. Their daughter Anne (1580–1647) was heiress presumptive to the English throne upon the death of Elizabeth I according to the will of Henry VIII and the Third Succession Act. As Lady Derby, Alice was a noted patron of the arts and to whom poet Edmund Spenser represented the character "Amaryllis" in his eclogue Colin Clouts Come Home Againe in 1595 and dedicated his poem The Teares of the Muses in 1591.
- Lady Georgiana Spencer (1757–1806), daughter of the 1st Earl Spencer, married William Cavendish, 5th Duke of Devonshire
- Diana Russell, Duchess of Bedford (born Lady Diana Spencer), daughter of the 3rd Earl of Sunderland, married in 1731 John Russell, 4th Duke of Bedford
- Diana, Princess of Wales (born The Hon. Diana Spencer), daughter of the 8th Earl Spencer, married in 1981 Charles, Prince of Wales (later King Charles III), and had issue. They separated in 1992 and divorced in 1996.
- Clarissa Spencer-Churchill, daughter of Jack Spencer-Churchill (younger brother of Sir Winston Churchill), married Sir Anthony Eden, Prime Minister of the United Kingdom.
- Sir Winston Churchill (1874–1965), Prime Minister of the United Kingdom, grandson of the 7th Duke of Marlborough, married Clementine Hozier (1885–1977), later a life peeress in her own right as Baroness Spencer-Churchill.
- The 9th Duke of Marlborough married Consuelo Vanderbilt, member of the prominent American Vanderbilt family.
- The 11th Duke of Marlborough married in 1961 Athina Livanos, former wife of Aristotle Onassis. In 1972 he married Countess Rosita Douglas-Stjernorp, daughter of Swedish nobleman and diplomat Count Carl Douglas-Stjernorp. They were divorced in 2008. Her elder sister Elisabeth (b. 1940) is married to Prince Max, Duke in Bavaria, heir presumptive to the Headship of the Royal House of Bavaria. As an artist, she is known professionally as Rosita Marlborough.
- Mary Spencer-Churchill, daughter of Sir Winston Churchill, married Christopher Soames, Baron Soames, and was made a Lady of the Garter in 2005.
- The 7th Earl Spencer, when heir to the earldom and styled Viscount Althorp, married in 1919 Lady Cynthia Hamilton, daughter of the 3rd Duke of Abercorn.
- The 8th Earl Spencer, when heir to the earldom and styled Viscount Althorp, married in 1954 the Hon. Frances Ruth Roche, daughter of the 4th Baron Fermoy.
- The 9th Earl Spencer, then Viscount Althorp, married Victoria Lockwood, a British fashion model, in 1989. They divorced in 1997. He married his second wife, Caroline Hutton, in 2001 and they divorced in 2007. He married his third wife, Karen Gordon, a Canadian philanthropist, in 2011. He married his fourth wife, Norwegian archaeologist Dr Cat Jarman in 2026.

=== Other notable members ===
- Lady Diana Beauclerk (née Spencer) (1734–1808), eldest child of the 3rd Duke of Marlborough, was artist and Lady of the Bedchamber to Queen Charlotte from 1762 to 1768.
- Lord Charles Spencer (1740–1820), second son of the 3rd Duke of Marlborough, was Postmaster General of the United Kingdom from 1801 to 1806 and Master of the Mint in 1806.
- William Robert Spencer (1769–1834), younger son of Lord Charles Spencer, became a poet and wit.
- Aubrey George Spencer (1795–1872), son of the poet William Robert Spencer, became the first Bishop of Newfoundland in 1839, later Bishop of Jamaica.
- George John Trevor Spencer (1799–1866), son of the poet William Robert Spencer, became Bishop of Madras in 1837.
- George Spencer (1799–1864), son of the 2nd Earl Spencer. He was first an Anglican priest, converted to Catholicism to become a Roman Catholic priest as Father Ignatius, worked as a missionary and is now a candidate for beatification.
- General Sir Augustus Almeric Spencer, GCB (1807–1893), third son of Francis Almeric Spencer, 1st Baron Churchill (1779–1845).
- Lord Randolph Henry Spencer-Churchill, publicly known as Lord Randolph Churchill (1849–1895), son of the 7th Duke of Marlborough, Chancellor of the Exchequer and Leader of the House of Commons, father of Sir Winston Leonard Spencer Churchill.
- The Reverend Canon Henry Spencer Stephenson, M.A. (1871–1957), Chaplain to King George VI and Queen Elizabeth II.
- Randolph Frederick Edward Spencer-Churchill, publicly known as Randolph Churchill (1911–1968), son of Sir Winston Leonard Spencer Churchill.
- Lady Sarah Spencer-Churchill (1921–2000), daughter of John Spencer-Churchill, 10th Duke of Marlborough
- Lady Rosemary Spencer-Churchill (born 1929), maid of honour to Elizabeth II at her coronation in 1953.
- Lady Kitty Spencer (born 1990), daughter of Charles Spencer, 9th Earl Spencer
- Lady Amelia Spencer (born 1992), daughter of Charles Spencer, 9th Earl Spencer
- Lady Eliza Spencer (born 1992), daughter of Charles Spencer, 9th Earl Spencer
- George Spencer-Churchill, Marquess of Blandford (born 1992), son of James Spencer-Churchill, 12th Duke of Marlborough
- Louis Spencer, Viscount Althorp (born 1994), son of Charles Spencer, 9th Earl Spencer
- Lady Araminta Spencer-Churchill (born 2007), daughter of James Spencer-Churchill, 12th Duke of Marlborough

== Members of the Order of the Garter ==
Many members of the Spencer family have also been knights or ladies of the Order of the Garter. The following is a list is of all Spencer members of this order, across all branches of the family, along with their year of investiture.

- 1601 – Robert Spencer, 1st Baron Spencer
- 1687 – Robert Spencer, 2nd Earl of Sunderland
- 1719 – Charles Spencer, 3rd Earl of Sunderland
- 1741 – Charles Spencer, 3rd Duke of Marlborough
- 1768 – George Spencer, 4th Duke of Marlborough
- 1799 – George Spencer, 2nd Earl Spencer
- 1849 – Frederick Spencer, 4th Earl Spencer
- 1865 – John Spencer, 5th Earl Spencer
- 1868 – John Spencer-Churchill, 7th Duke of Marlborough
- 1902 – Charles Spencer-Churchill, 9th Duke of Marlborough
- 1913 – Charles Spencer, 6th Earl Spencer
- 1953 – Sir Winston Churchill
- 2005 – Mary, Baroness Soames, née Spencer-Churchill

== Family tree ==
Spencer family

Line of Althorp

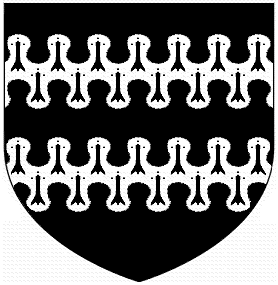
Spencer of Spencercombe

Baronet of Yarnton

Baronet of Offley

Baron Spencer of Wormleighton

Earls of Sunderland

Dukes of Marlborough

Earls Spencer

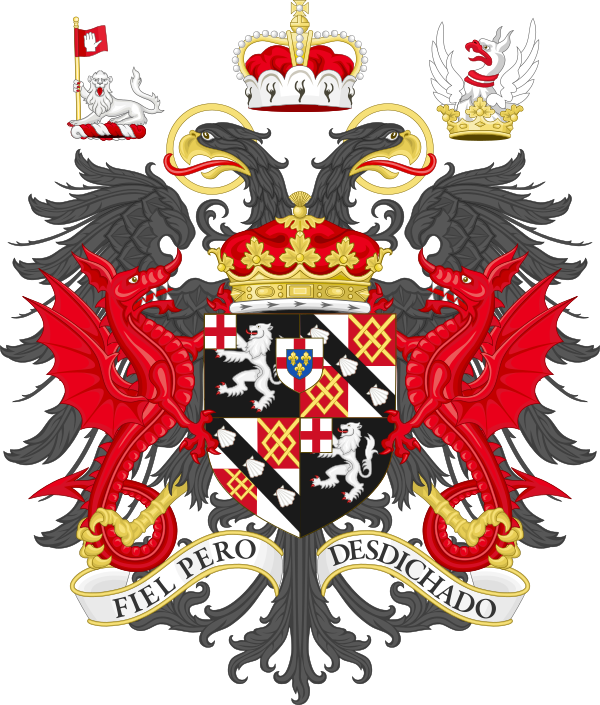
Spencer-Churchill; Dukes of Marlborough

Descent to Winston Churchill

Spencer; Barons and Viscounts Churchill

=== Spencer origins ===
Spencer origins family tree

Thomas Spencer; 1366–?
Henry Spencer; 1392–1476 | Isabel Lincoln
John Spencer; 1420–1486 | Thomas Spencer | William Spencer | Nicholas Spencer
Elizabeth Empson | William Spencer ?–1498 | Spencer of Hodnell | Sir John Spencer of Snitterfield
Sir John Spencer; 1447–1522 | Isabel Graunt | Jane Spencer | Stephen Cope | Thomas Spencer
Anthony Spencer | Jane Spencer | Richard Knightley | Sir William Spencer; 1496–1532 | Susan Knightley | Spencer of Badby (emigrated to America in XVII century)
Katherine Kitson | Sir John Spencer; 1524–1586 | altre 5 figlie
Anne, lady Mounteagle ?–1618 | Elizabeth, lady Hunsdon; 1552–1618 | George Carey, II barone Hunsdon; 1547–1603 | Thomas Egerton; 1540–1617 | Alice Spencer; 1559–1637 | Ferdinando Stanley, 5th Earl of Derby; 1559–1594 | Sir John Spencer; 1549–1600 | Mary Catlin
Sir Richard Spencer; 1559–1624 | Helen Elinora Brocket | Sir William Spencer; 1555–1609
Spencer of Offley (extinct in 1699) | Spencer of Yarnton (extinct in 1741) | Robert Spencer, I Baron Spencer of Wormleighton; From here descends Spencer, Baron Spencer of Wormleighton, earl of Sunderland

=== Barons Spencer of Wormleighton and Earls of Sunderland ===
Spencer Barons of Wormleighton and Earls of Sunderland family tree

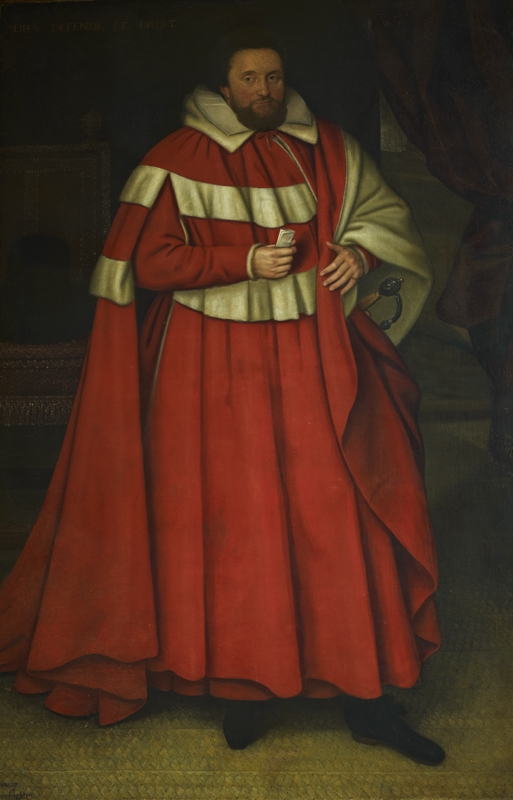
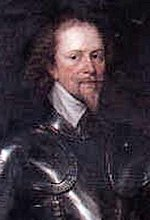
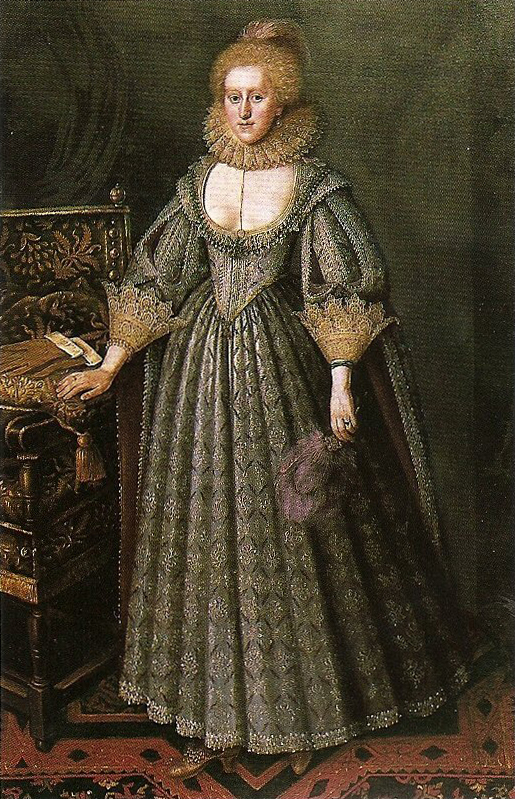
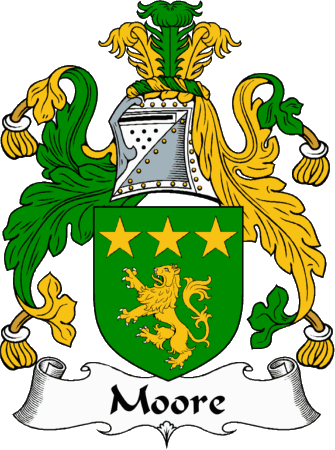
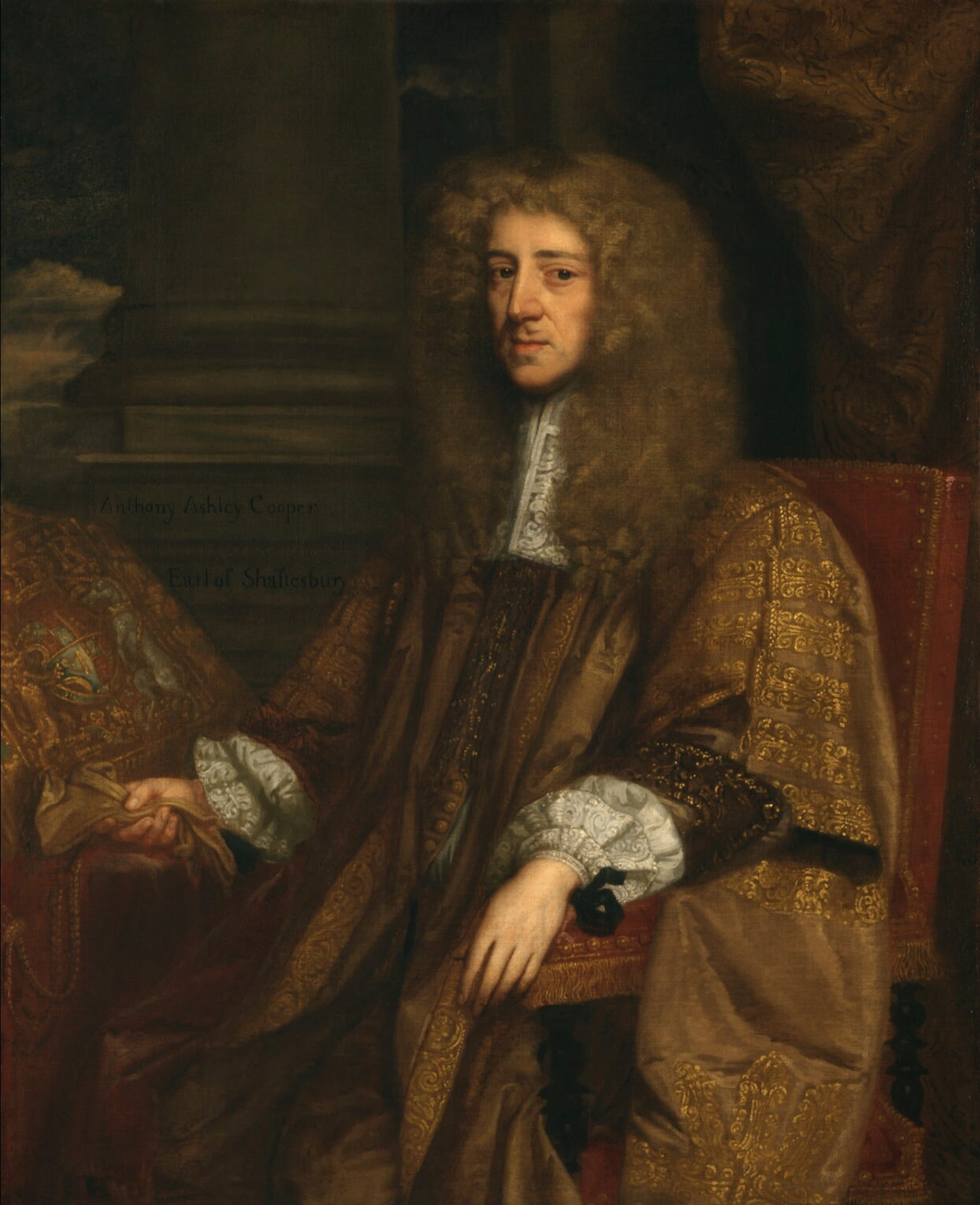
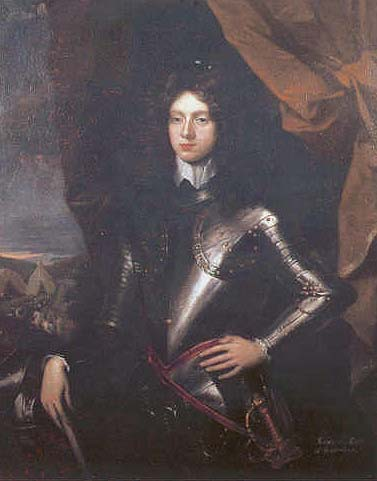
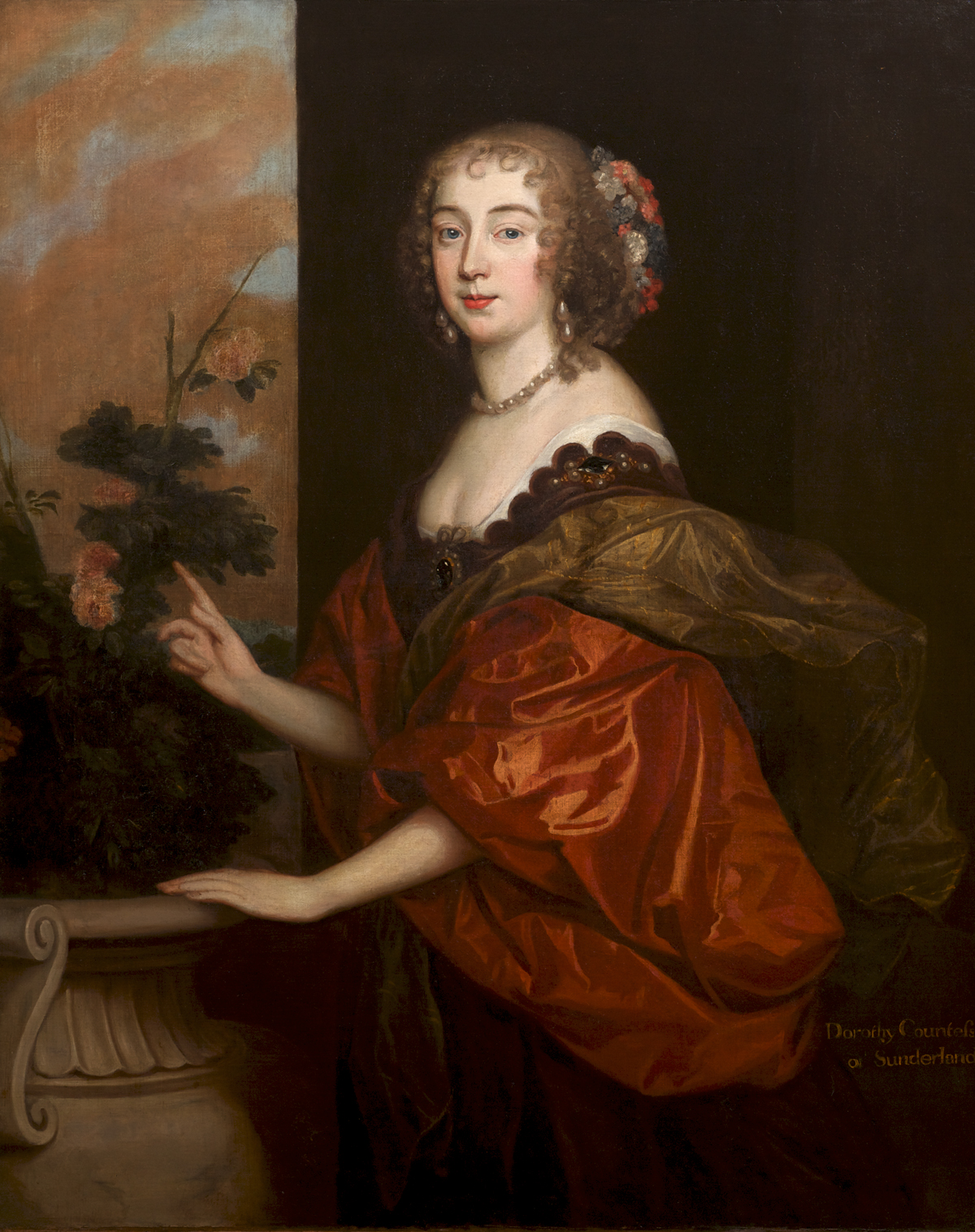
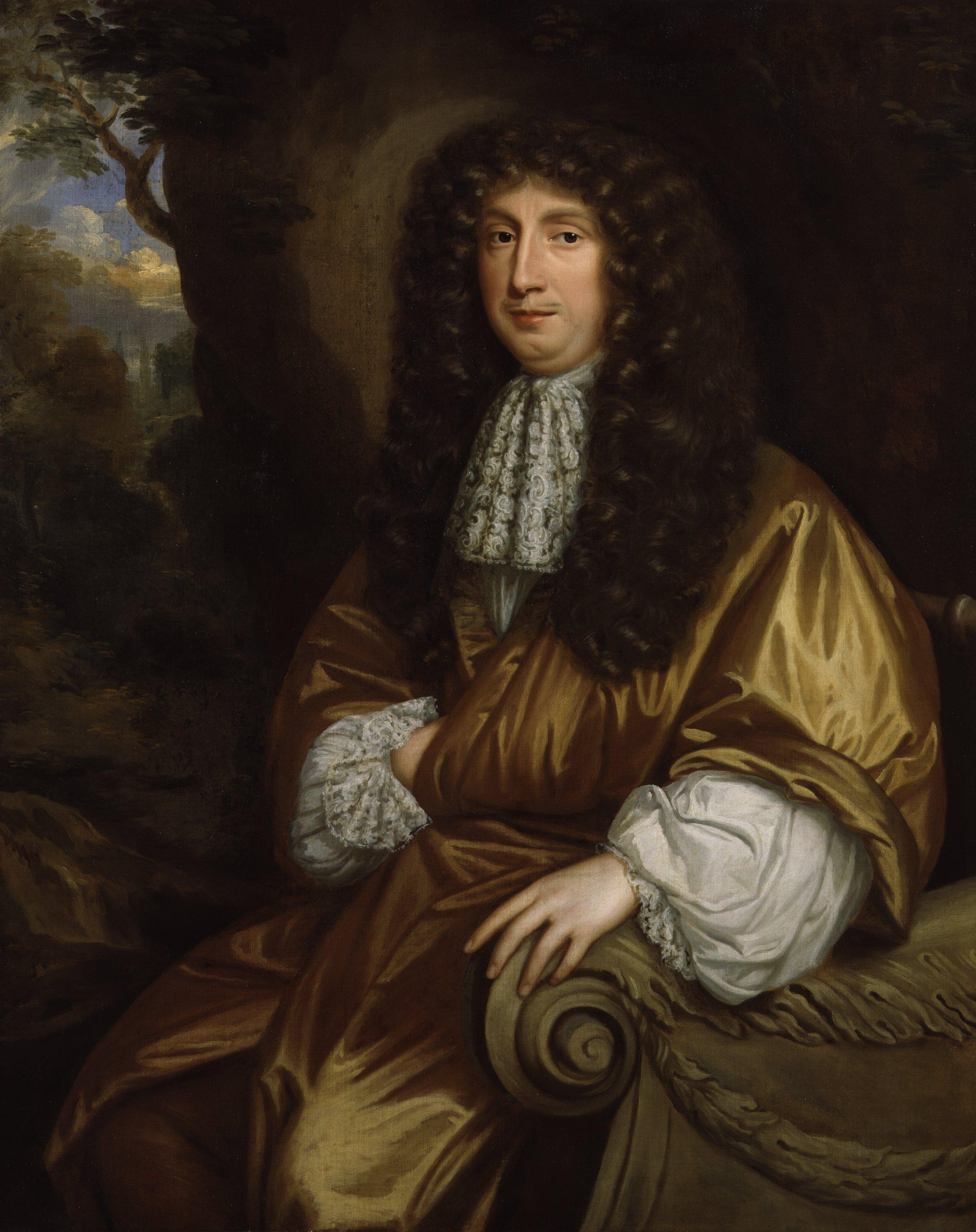
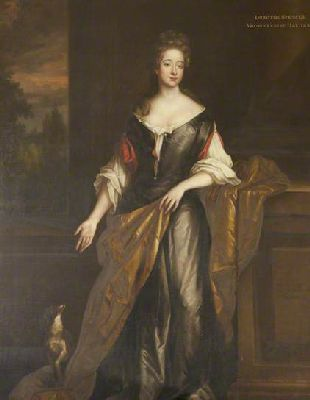
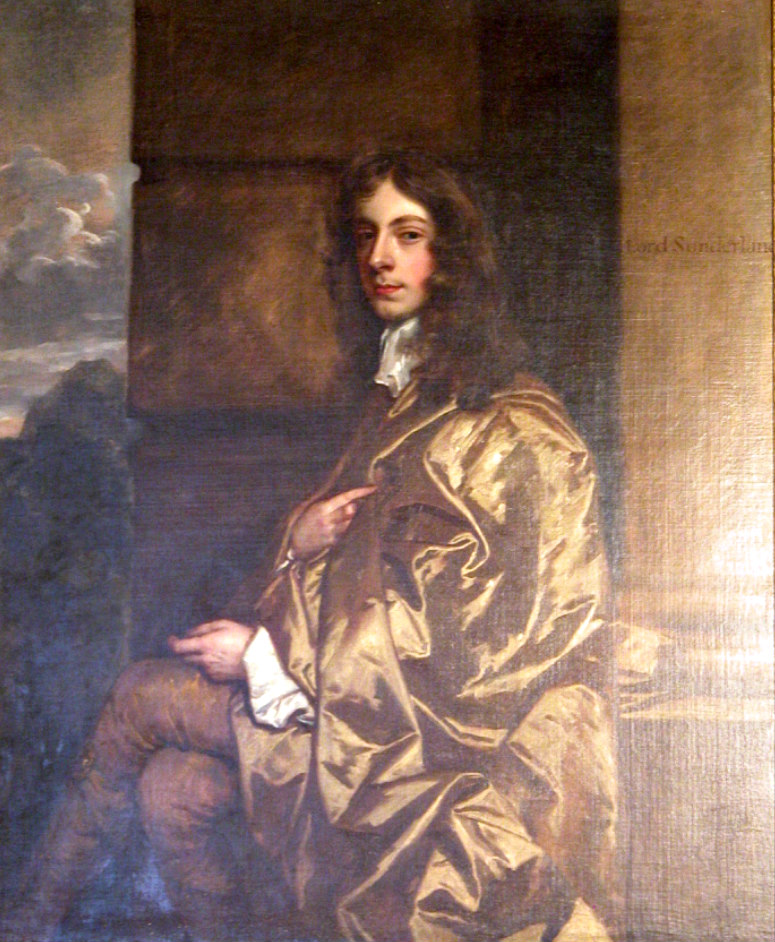
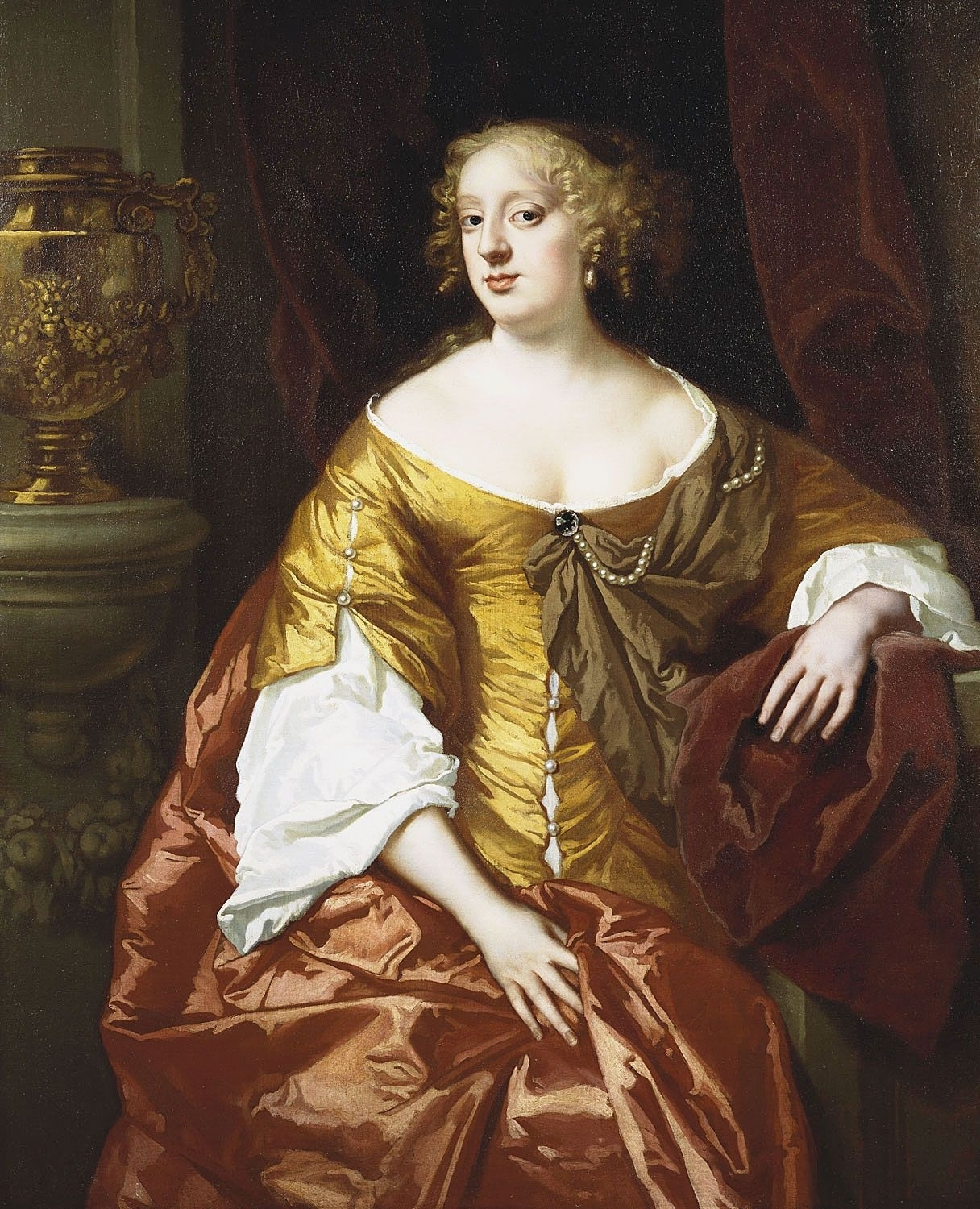
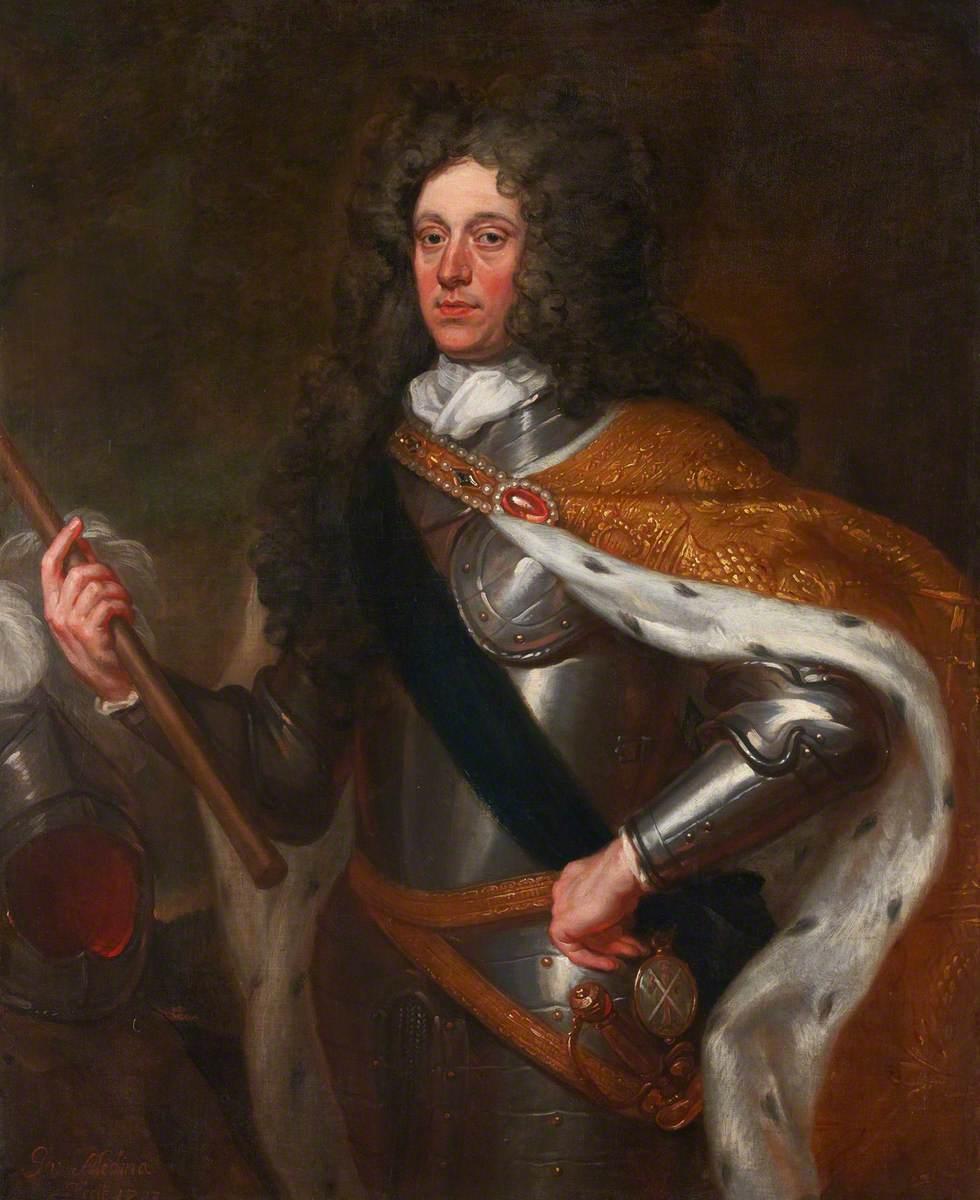
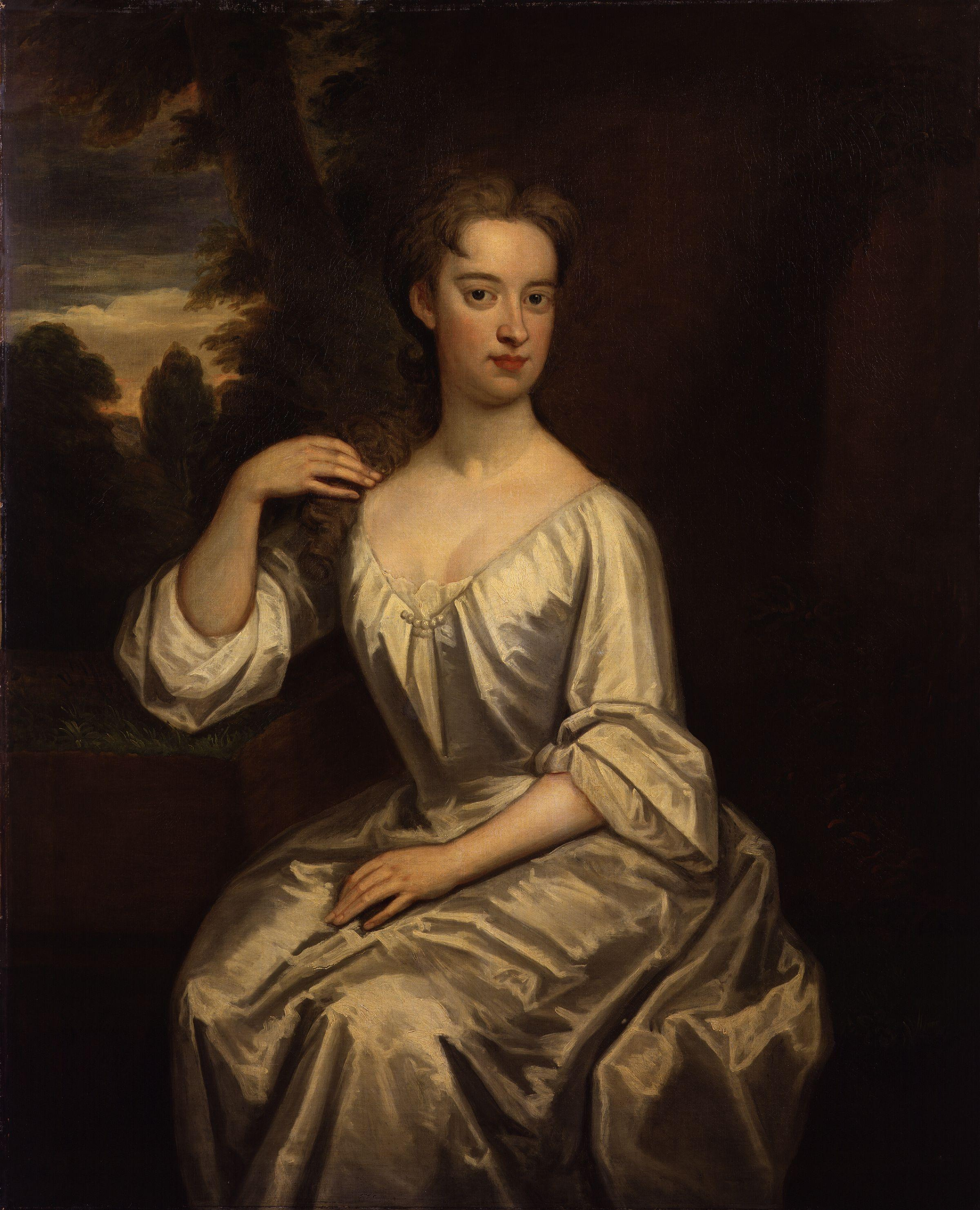
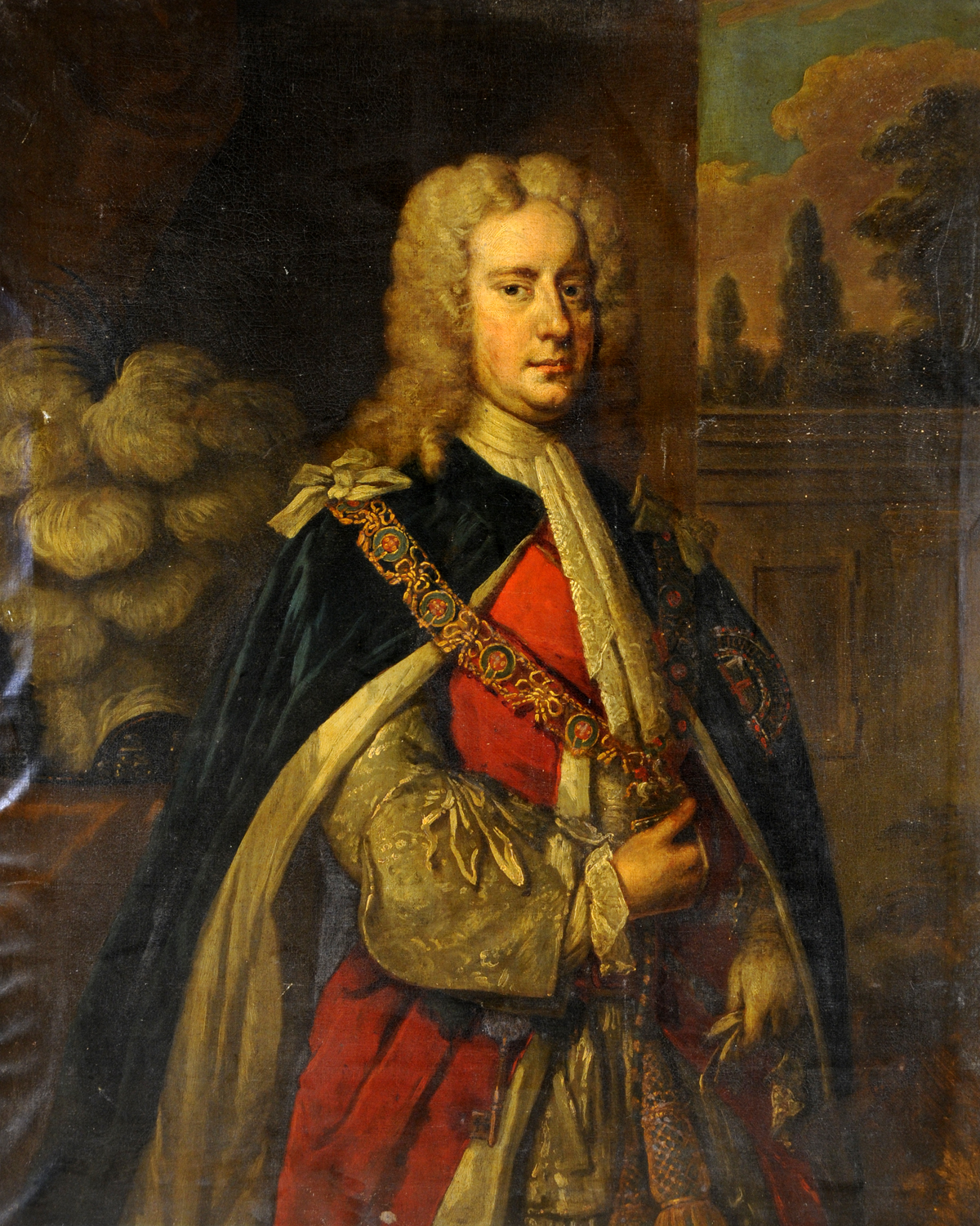
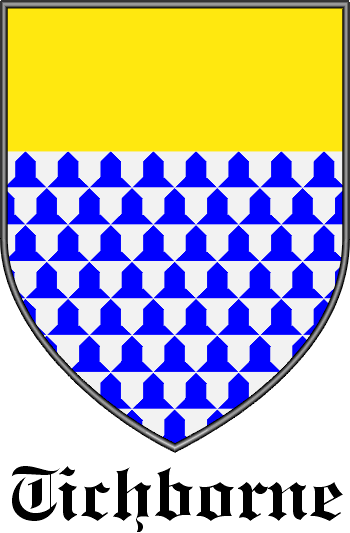
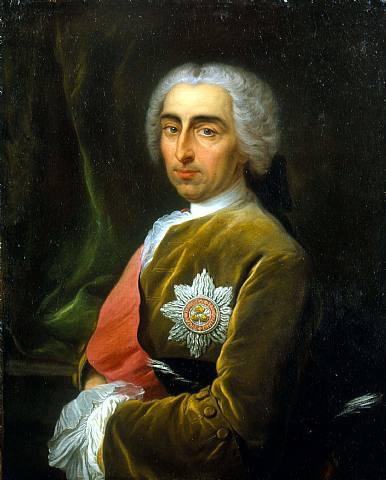
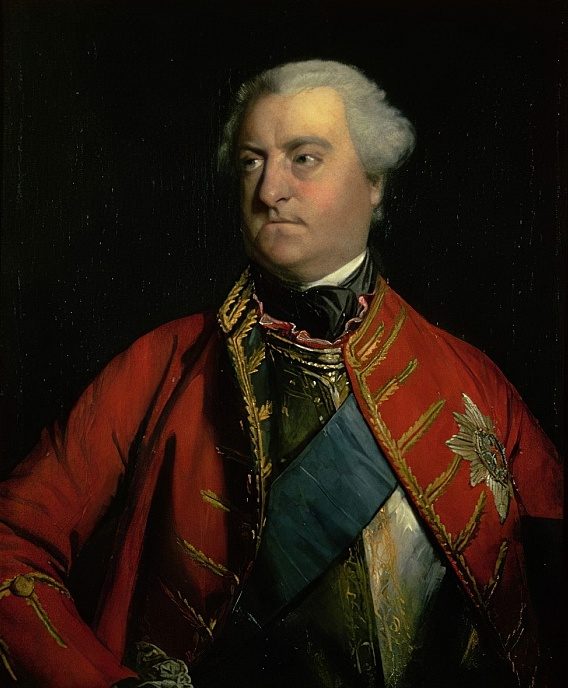
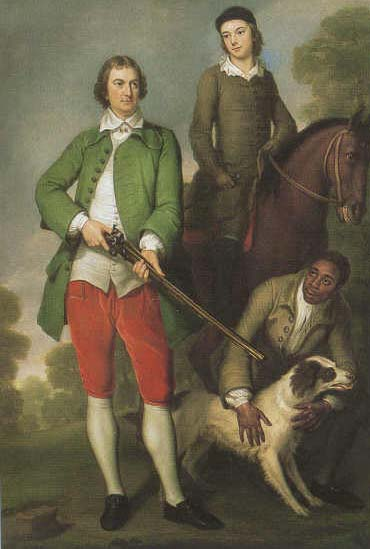
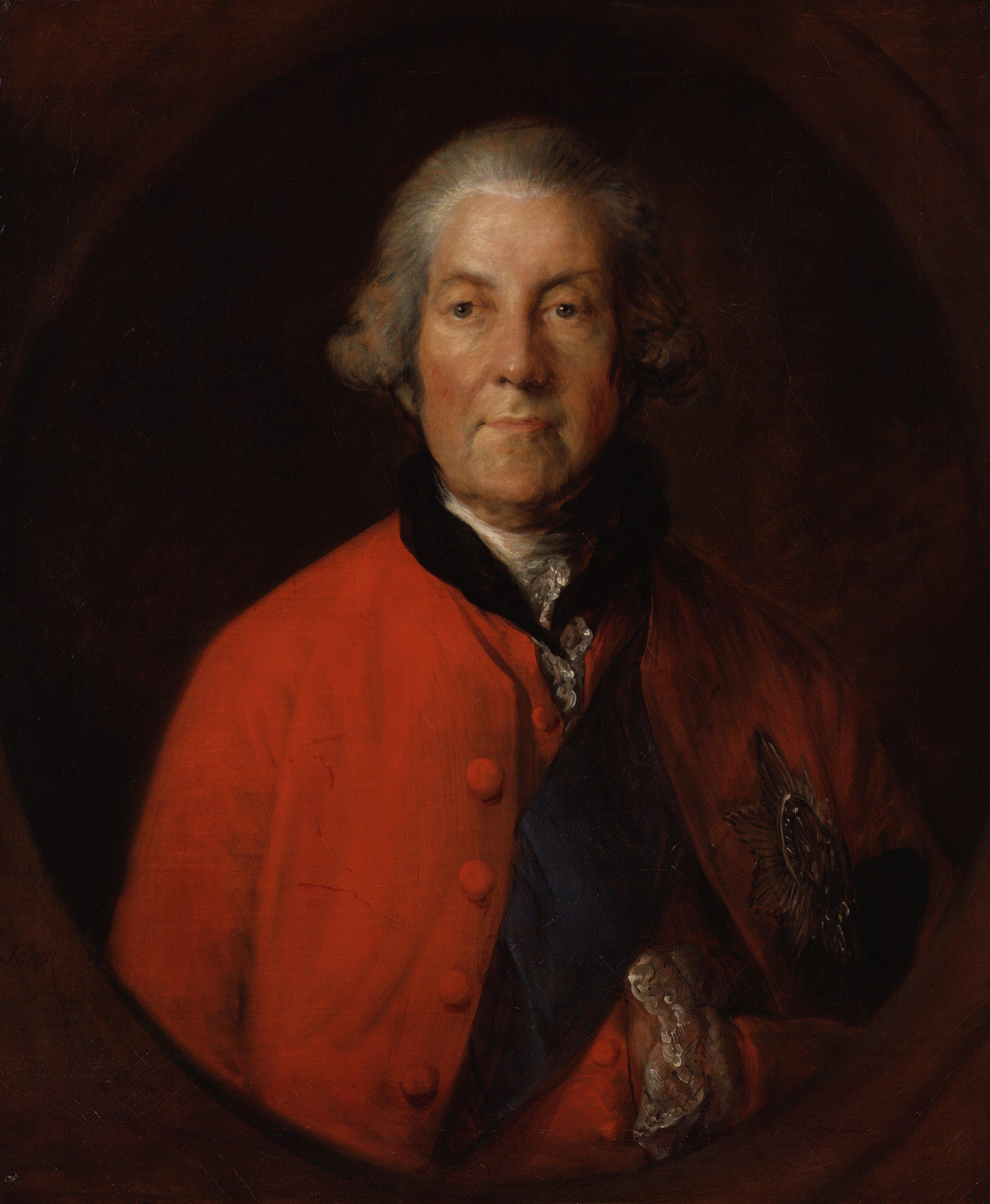
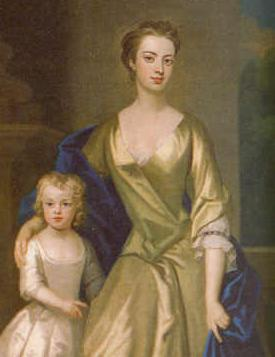
Robert Spencer, I Baron Spencer of Wormleighton 1570–1627 | Margaret Willoughby; 1560–1597
John Spencer; 1590–1610 a Blois | Mary Spencer; 1588–1592 | Richard Spencer Member of Parliament; 1593–1661 | Edward Spencer Member of Parliament; 1595–1656
William Spencer, II Baron Spencer of Wormleighton 1591–1636 | Penelope Wriothesley 1598–1667
Henry Howard m.1663 | Elizabeth Spencer; 1618–1672 | Henry Moore, 1st Earl of Drogheda; 1628–1675 | Alice Spencer; 1625–1675 | William Spencer of Ashton; 1625–1688 | Elizabeth Gerard | Margaret Spencer; 1627–1693 | Anthony Ashley Cooper, 1st Earl of Shaftesbury 1621–1683 | Robert Spencer, visconte Teviot; 1629–1694 | Jane Spencer of Yarnton; 1657–1689
Henry Spencer, 1st Earl of Sunderland 1620–1643 | Dorothy Sidney 1617–1684
George Savile, 1st Marquess of Halifax 1633–1695 | Dorothy Spencer 1640–1670 | Penelope Spencer; 1644–1645 | Robert Spencer, 2nd Earl of Sunderland 1641–1702 | Anne Digby 1646–1715
Robert Spencer; 1666–1688 | Anne Spencer; 1667–1690 | James Hamilton, 4th Duke of Hamilton 1658–1712 | Isabella Spencer; 1668–1684 | Elizabeth Spencer; 1671–1704 | Donough MacCarthy, IV Earl of Clancarty; 1668–1734
Anne Churchill 1683–1716 | Charles Spencer, 3rd Earl of Sunderland 1675–1722 | Arabella Cavendish; 1673–1698
Judith Tichborne; 1702–1749 | Frances Spencer; 1696–1742 | Henry Howard, 4th Earl of Carlisle; 1694–1758
Robert Spencer, 4th Earl of Sunderland; 1701–1729 | Anne Spencer; 1702–1769 | William Bateman, I visconte Bateman 1695–1744
Charles Spencer, 3rd Duke of Marlborough 1706–1758 | John Spencer 1708–1746 | John Russell, 4th Duke of Bedford 1710–1771 | Diana Spencer 1710–1735 | NN; 1718–1718 | NN; 1719–1719 | William Spencer; 1720–1722
Spencer-Churchill; Dukes of Marlborough | Earls Spencer

=== Dukes of Marlborough ===
Spencer-Churchill family tree of the Dukes of Marlborough, Earls of Sunderland and Earls Spencer

Baron Spencer of Wormleighton, 1603
Robert Spencer; 1570–1627; 1st Baron Spencer of Wormleighton
John Spencer; 1590–1610 | William Spencer; 1592–1636; 2nd Baron Spencer of Wormleighton | John Churchill; 1600–1673
Earl of Sunderland (2nd creation), 1643
Henry Spencer; 1620–1643; 1st Earl of Sunderland, 3rd Baron Spencer of Wormleighton | Winston Churchill; 1620–1688
Lord Churchill of Eyemouth (Scotland), 1682; Baron Churchill of Sandridge, 1685; Earl of Marlborough (2nd creation), 1689; Duke of Marlborough and Marquess of Blandford, 1702
Robert Spencer; 1640–1702; 2nd Earl of Sunderland, 4th Baron Spencer of Wormleighton | John Churchill; 1650–1722; 1st Duke of Marlborough, Marquess of Blandford, Earl of Marlborough, Lord Churchill of Eyemouth, and Baron Churchill of Sandridge | King James VII and II; 1633–1701 | Arabella Churchill; 1648–1730
Francis Godolphin; 1678–1766; Earl of Godolphin | Henrietta Churchill; 1681–1733; 2nd Duchess of Marlborough, Marchioness of Blandford, Countess of Marlborough, and Baroness Churchill of Sandridge | Charles Spencer; 1675–1722; 3rd Earl of Sunderland, 5th Baron Spencer of Wormleighton | Anne Churchill; 1683–1716 | John Churchill; 1686–1703; Styled Marquess of Blandford | James FitzJames; 1670–1734; Duke of Berwick | Henry FitzJames; 1673–1702; Duke of Albemarle (Jacobite) | Henry Waldegrave, Baron Waldegrave; 1661–1689 | Henrietta FitzJames; 1667–1730
William Godolphin; 1700–1731; Styled Marquess of Blandford | Robert Spencer; 1701–1729; 4th Earl of Sunderland, 6th Baron Spencer of Wormleighton | Charles Spencer; 1706–1758; 3rd Duke of Marlborough, Marquess of Blandford, Earl of Marlborough, and Baron Churchill of Sandridge, 5th Earl of Sunderland, 7th Baron Spencer of Wormleighton | John Spencer; 1708–1746 | Dukes of Berwick (Jacobite) | Dukes of Albemarle (Jacobite) | James Waldegrave, Earl Waldegrave; 1684–1741
Viscount Spencer and Baron Spencer of Althorp, 1761; Earl Spencer, 1765
George Spencer; 1739–1817; 4th Duke of Marlborough, Marquess of Blandford, Earl of Marlborough, and Baron Churchill of Sandridge, 6th Earl of Sunderland, 8th Baron Spencer of Wormleighton | John Spencer; 1734–1783; 1st Earl Spencer, Viscount Spencer, and Baron Spencer of Althorp | James Waldegrave, Earl Waldegrave; 1715–1763
Baron Churchill of Wychwood, 1815
George Spencer-Churchill; 1766–1840; 5th Duke of Marlborough, Marquess of Blandford, Earl of Marlborough, and Baron Churchill of Sandridge, 7th Earl of Sunderland, 9th Baron Spencer of Wormleighton | Francis Almeric Spencer; 1779–1845; 1st Baron Churchill of Wychwood | George Spencer; 1758–1834; 2nd Earl Spencer, Viscount Spencer, and Baron Spencer of Althorp | Hugh Seymour; 1759–1801 | Anne Horatia Waldegrave; 1762–1801
George Spencer-Churchill; 1793–1857; 6th Duke of Marlborough, Marquess of Blandford, Earl of Marlborough, and Baron Churchill of Sandridge, 8th Earl of Sunderland, 10th Baron Spencer of Wormleighton | Francis George Spencer; 1802–1886; 2nd Baron Churchill of Wychwood | Augustus Spencer; 1807–1893 | John Spencer; 1782–1845; 3rd Earl Spencer, Viscount Spencer, Baron Spencer of Althorp | Horace Beauchamp Seymour; 1791–1851
John Winston Spencer-Churchill; 1822–1883; 7th Duke of Marlborough, Marquess of Blandford, Earl of Marlborough, and Baron Churchill of Sandridge, 9th Earl of Sunderland, 11th Baron Spencer of Wormleighton | Georgiana Poyntz; 1799–1851 | Frederick Spencer; 1798–1857; 4th Earl Spencer, Viscount Spencer, and Baron Spencer of Althorp | Adelaide Horatia Seymour; 1825–1877
Viscount Althorp, 1905
George Charles Spencer-Churchill; 1844–1892; 8th Duke of Marlborough, Marquess of Blandford, Earl of Marlborough, and Baron Churchill of Sandridge, 10th Earl of Sunderland, 12th Baron Spencer of Wormleighton | Randolph Henry Spencer-Churchill; 1849–1895 | Augustus Spencer; 1851–1912 | John Poyntz Spencer; 1835–1910; 5th Earl Spencer, Viscount Spencer, and Baron Spencer of Althorp | Charles Robert Spencer; 1857–1922; 6th Earl Spencer, Viscount Spencer, and Baron Spencer of Althorp, 1st Viscount Althorp
Viscount Churchill, 1902
Charles Richard John Spencer-Churchill; 1871–1934; 9th Duke of Marlborough, Marquess of Blandford, Earl of Marlborough, and Baron Churchill of Sandridge, 11th Earl of Sunderland, 13th Baron Spencer of Wormleighton | Winston Leonard Spencer Churchill; 1874–1965; Prime Minister of the United Kingdom; 1940–1945 and 1951–1955 | Victor Albert Francis Charles Spencer; 1864–1934; 1st Viscount Churchill, 3rd Baron Churchill of Wychwood
(Descendants of Winston Churchill)
John Albert William Spencer-Churchill; 1897–1972; 10th Duke of Marlborough, Marquess of Blandford, Earl of Marlborough, and Baron Churchill of Sandridge, 12th Earl of Sunderland, 14th Baron Spencer of Wormleighton | Victor Alexander Spencer; 1890–1973; 2nd Viscount Churchill, 4th Baron Churchill of Wychwood | Richard Spencer; 1888–1956 | Albert Spencer; 1892–1975; 7th Earl Spencer, Viscount Spencer, and Baron Spencer of Althorp, 2nd Viscount Althorp
John George Vanderbilt Henry Spencer-Churchill; 1926–2014; 11th Duke of Marlborough, Marquess of Blandford, Earl of Marlborough, and Baron Churchill of Sandridge, 13th Earl of Sunderland, 15th Baron Spencer of Wormleighton | Victor George Spencer; 1934–2017; 3rd Viscount Churchill, 5th Baron Churchill of Wychwood | Richard Spencer; 1926–2020; 6th Baron Churchill of Wychwood | Edward John Spencer; 1924–1992; 8th Earl Spencer, Viscount Spencer, and Baron Spencer of Althorp, 3rd Viscount Althorp
Viscountcy Churchill extinct, 2017
Charles James Spencer-Churchill b. 1955; 12th Duke of Marlborough, Marquess of Blandford, Earl of Marlborough, and Baron Churchill of Sandridge, 14th Earl of Sunderland, 16th Baron Spencer of Wormleighton | Michael Spencer b. 1960; 7th Baron Churchill of Wychwood | David Anthony Spencer b. 1970; Heir Presumptive to Wychwood | King Charles III b. 1948 | Diana Frances Spencer; 1961–1997 | Charles Edward Maurice Spencer b. 1964; 9th Earl Spencer, Viscount Spencer, and Baron Spencer of Althorp, 4th Viscount Althorp
George John Godolphin Spencer-Churchill b. 1992; Styled Marquess of Blandford | William, Prince of Wales b. 1982 | Harry, Duke of Sussex b. 1984 | Louis Frederick John Spencer b. 1994; Styled Viscount Althorp
Lady Olympia Spencer-Churchill b. 2020

Descendants of Winston Spencer-Churchill: family tree and Dukes of Marlborough

DUKES OF MARLBOROUGH
John Winston Spencer-Churchill, 7th Duke of Marlborough (1822–1883)
George Charles Spencer-Churchill, 8th Duke of Marlborough (1844–1892) | Lord Randolph (Spencer-) Churchill (1849–1895)
Charles Richard John Spencer-Churchill, 9th Duke of Marlborough (1871–1934) | Sir Winston (Spencer-) Churchill (1874–1965); P.M. 1940–45, 1951–55 | John (Spencer-) Churchill (1880–1947)
John Albert William Spencer-Churchill, 10th Duke of Marlborough (1897–1972) | Diana (Spencer-) Churchill (1909–1963) | Randolph (Spencer-) Churchill (1911–1968) | Sarah (Spencer-) Churchill (1914–1982) | Marigold (Spencer-) Churchill (1918–1921) | Mary Soames, Baroness Soames (née Churchill) (1922–2014)
John George Vanderbilt Henry Spencer-Churchill, 11th Duke of Marlborough (1926–2014) | Winston (Spencer-) Churchill (1940–2010) | Arabella (Spencer-) Churchill (1949–2007)
Charles James Spencer-Churchill, 12th Duke of Marlborough (b. 1955) | Randolph Leonard (Spencer-) Churchill b.1965 | Jennie (Spencer-) Churchill b.1966 | Marina (Spencer-) Churchill b.1967 | John Gerard Averell "Jack" (Spencer-) Churchill b. 1975
George John Godolphin Spencer-Churchill, Marquess of Blandford (b. 1992)

=== Earls Spencer ===
For the Earls Spencer from John Spencer to present see: Family Tree of the Earls Spencer.

=== Barons and Viscounts Churchill ===
Male-line family tree, Barons Churchill and Viscounts Churchill.

Francis Spencer; 1st Baron Churchill; 1779–1845
Francis Spencer; 2nd Baron Churchill; 1802–1886 | Lt. Col. Hon. George Spencer; 1804–1877 | Gen. Hon. Sir Augustus Spencer; 1807–1893
Viscount Churchill
Victor Spencer; 1st Viscount Churchill; 3rd Baron Churchill; 1864–1934 | Lt. Col. John Spencer-Munro; 1849–1916 | Lt. Col. Augustus Spencer; 1851–1912
Hon. Victor Spencer; 1888–1888 | Victor Spencer; 2nd Viscount Churchill; 4th Baron Churchill; 1890–1973 | Victor Spencer; 3rd Viscount Churchill; 5th Baron Churchill; 1934–2017 | Capt. Almeric Spencer-Munro; 1885–1960 | Col. Richard Spencer; 1888–1956
Viscountcy extinct
Richard Spencer; 6th Baron Churchill; 1926–2020
Michael Spencer; 7th Baron Churchill born 1960 | Hon. David Spencer born 1970

== Bibliography ==
- Round, J. H. (1901). Studies in Peerage and Family History. London: A. Constable and Company.
