= Francis Spencer, 2nd Baron Churchill =

British peer and diplomat

The Right Honourable The Lord Churchill DCL DL

Personal details
- Born: Francis George Spencer; 6 October 1802 Blenheim Palace, Woodstock, Oxfordshire
- Died: 24 November 1886 (aged 84) Mayfair, London
- Spouse: Lady Jane Conyngham (m. 1849)
- Children: Victor Spencer, 1st Viscount Churchill
- Parent(s): Francis Spencer, 1st Baron Churchill; Lady Frances FitzRoy
- Education: Harrow School
- Alma mater: Christ Church, Oxford

Francis George Spencer, 2nd Baron Churchill, DCL, DL (6 October 1802 – 24 November 1886), was a British peer and diplomat from the Spencer family.

== Early life ==
Spencer was born on 6 October 1802 at Blenheim Palace, Woodstock, Oxfordshire. He was the eldest son of Francis Spencer, 1st Baron Churchill, and Lady Frances FitzRoy. His younger sister, Hon. Caroline Elizabeth Spencer, married Robert Dillon, 3rd Baron Clonbrock, and his brother, Sir Augustus Spencer, married Helen Maria Campbell (daughter of Lt.-Gen. Sir Archibald Campbell, 1st Baronet). His father served as MP for Oxfordshire from 1801 to 1815.

His paternal grandparents were George Spencer, 4th Duke of Marlborough, and the former Lady Caroline Russell (a daughter of John Russell, 4th Duke of Bedford, the British Ambassador to France). His maternal grandparents were the former Elizabeth Wrottesley (daughter of Rev. Sir Richard Wrottesley, 7th Baronet, Dean of Worcester) and Augustus FitzRoy, 3rd Duke of Grafton, who served as Prime Minister from October 1768 to January 1770.

He was educated at Harrow School before matriculating at Christ Church, Oxford, in 1821.

== Career ==
From 1823 and 1828, he served as the British attaché in Austria before becoming the attaché at Lisbon in 1828. He returned to Oxford, where he graduated with a Doctor of Civil Law in 1834.

Upon the death of his father, he succeeded as the 2nd Baron Churchill of Wychwood, on 7 March 1845. He served as Deputy Lieutenant for Oxfordshire and was Lieut.-Col. Commandant of the Oxfordshire Yeomanry since 1857.

== Personal life ==
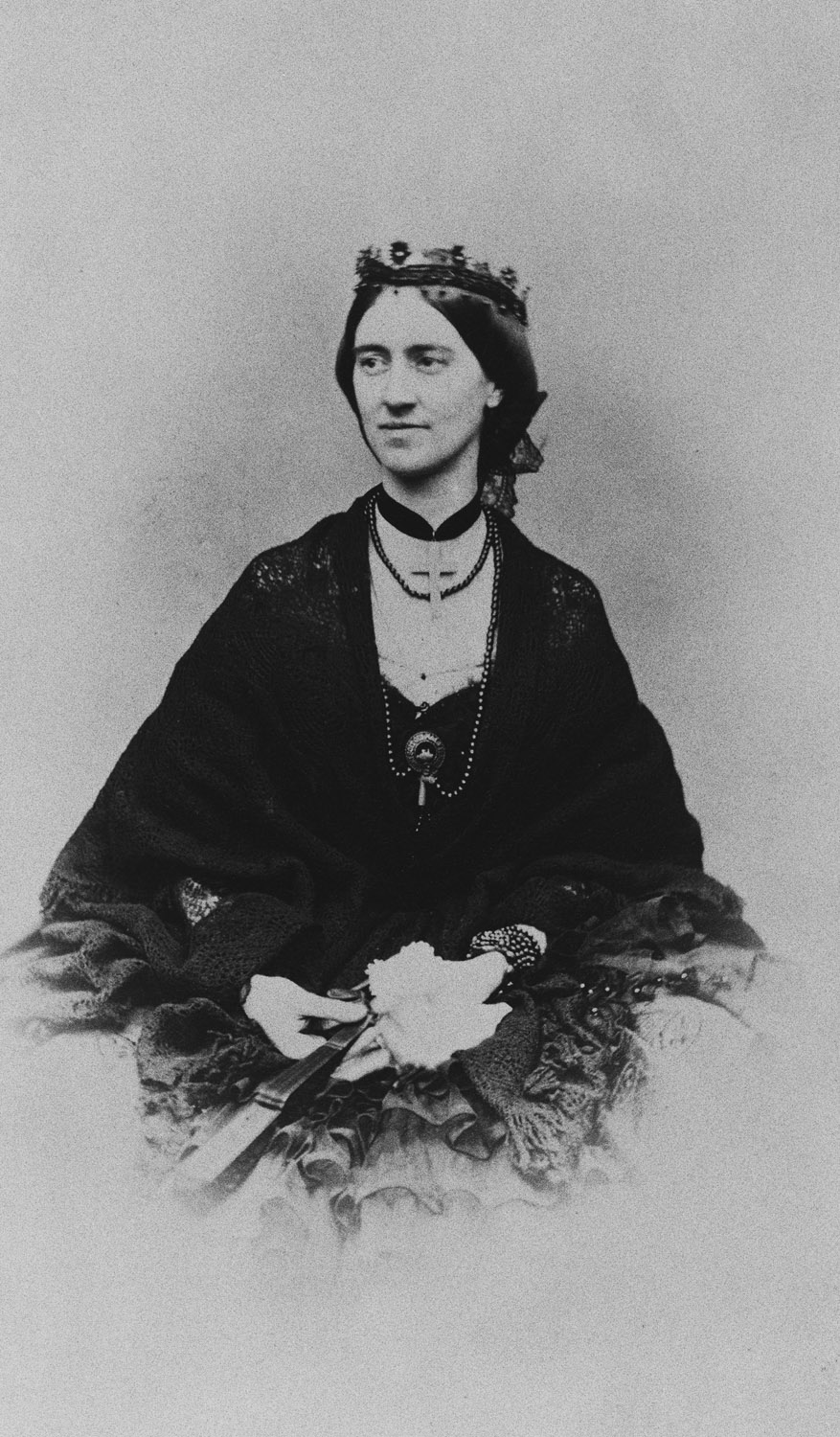
Photograph of his wife, Jane Spencer, Baroness Churchill, 1862.

On 19 May 1849, he married Lady Jane Conyngham at Bifrons, Kent. She was the eldest daughter of Gen. Sir Francis Conyngham, 2nd Marquess Conyngham, and Lady Jane Paget (a daughter of Henry Paget, 1st Marquess of Anglesey). His wife served as a Lady of the Bedchamber to Queen Victoria between 1854 and 1900. Together, Francis and Jane were the parents of one son:

- Victor Albert Francis Charles (1864–1934), who succeeded his father in the barony in 1886, and was further created Viscount Churchill in 1902. He married Lady Verena Maud Lowther, daughter of Henry Lowther, 3rd Earl of Lonsdale, in 1887. They divorced in 1927, and he married Christine McRae Sinclair, daughter of William Sinclair, in 1927.

He was a first cousin, twice removed, of Prime Minister and honorary citizen of the United States, Sir Winston Churchill. He was also a third cousin, four times removed, of Diana, Princess of Wales, and is thus third cousin, five times removed, of her sons, Princes William, the Prince of Wales, and Harry, Duke of Sussex.

He died on 24 November 1886, at age 84, at 32 Albemarle Street in Mayfair, London.

Peerage of the United Kingdom
Preceded by Francis Spencer	Baron Churchill; 1845–1886	Succeeded by Victor Spencer
