= Baron Churchill (1815 creation) =

Title in the Peerage of the United Kingdom

- Creation date: 11 August 1815
- Creation: First
- Created by: The Prince Regent (acting on behalf of his father King George III)
- Peerage: Peerage of the United Kingdom
- First holder: Lord Francis Spencer
- Present holder: Michael Spencer, 7th Baron Churchill
- Heir presumptive: Hon. David Spencer
- Status: Extant
- Motto: DIEU DEFEND LE DROIT (English: God defend my right)
- The Barony of Churchill was held by the Viscounts Churchill from 1902 to 2017

Viscount Churchill
- Creation date: 14 July 1902
- Created by: Edward VII
- Peerage: Peerage of the United Kingdom
- First holder: Victor Spencer, 3rd Baron Churchill
- Last holder: Victor Spencer, 3rd Viscount Churchill
- Status: Extinct
- Extinction date: 18 October 2017

Baron Churchill, of Wychwood in the County of Oxford, is a title in the Peerage of the United Kingdom and held by a branch of the Spencer family. It was created in 1815 for Lord Francis Spencer, younger son of the 4th Duke of Marlborough (see Duke of Marlborough for earlier history of the family). He had previously represented Oxfordshire in Parliament.

From 1902 to 2017, the barony was subsidiary title of the viscountcy of Churchill. The title of Viscount Churchill, of Rolleston in the County of Leicester, was created in the Peerage of the United Kingdom on 15 July 1902 for the first baron's grandson Conservative politician Victor Spencer, 3rd Baron Churchill. The viscountcy became extinct in 2017 on the death of the first Viscount's youngest son, the third Viscount, who had succeeded his half-brother, the second Viscount, in 1973.

The barony was inherited by the last Viscount's second cousin once removed, the great-grandson of General Sir Augustus Almeric Spencer, the third son of the 1st Baron Churchill.

== Baron Churchill (1815) ==
- Francis Almeric Spencer, 1st Baron Churchill (1779–1845)
- Francis George Spencer, 2nd Baron Churchill (1802–1886)
- Victor Albert Francis Charles Spencer, 3rd Baron Churchill (1864–1934, created Viscount Churchill in 1902)

=== Viscount Churchill (1902) ===
- Victor Albert Francis Charles Spencer, 1st Viscount Churchill (1864–1934)
- Victor Alexander Spencer, 2nd Viscount Churchill (1890–1973)
- Victor George Spencer, 3rd Viscount Churchill (1934–2017)

=== Baron Churchill (1815; reverted) ===
- Richard Harry Ramsay Spencer, 6th Baron Churchill (1926–2020)
- Michael Richard de Charrière Spencer, 7th Baron Churchill (born 1960)

The heir presumptive is the present holder's brother, the Hon. David Anthony de Charrière Spencer (born 1970).

=== Male-line family tree ===
Male-line family tree, Barons Churchill and Viscounts Churchill.

Francis Spencer; 1st Baron Churchill; 1779–1845
Francis Spencer; 2nd Baron Churchill; 1802–1886	Lt. Col. Hon. George Spencer; 1804–1877	Gen. Hon. Sir Augustus Spencer; 1807–1893
Viscount Churchill
Victor Spencer; 1st Viscount Churchill; 3rd Baron Churchill; 1864–1934	Lt. Col. John Spencer-Munro; 1849–1916	Lt. Col. Augustus Spencer; 1851–1912
Hon. Victor Spencer; 1888–1888	Victor Spencer; 2nd Viscount Churchill; 4th Baron Churchill; 1890–1973	Victor Spencer; 3rd Viscount Churchill; 5th Baron Churchill; 1934–2017	Capt. Almeric Spencer-Munro; 1885–1960	Col. Richard Spencer; 1888–1956
Viscountcy extinct
Richard Spencer; 6th Baron Churchill; 1926–2020
Michael Spencer; 7th Baron Churchill born 1960	Hon. David Spencer born 1970

== Arms ==
Coat of arms of Baron Churchill
Crest Out of a ducal Coronet or, a griffin’s head between two Wings expanded argent, gorged with a bar gemel gules, armed gold. Escutcheon Quarterly: 1st & 4th, quarterly argent and gules, in the second and third quarters charged with a fret or, over all on a bend sable with three escallops argent (Spencer); 2nd & 3rd, Sable, a lion rampant argent, on a canton of the last, a cross gules (Churchill). Supporters Dexter: A griffin wings erect per fess argent and or gorged with a collar of the last, thereon three escallops sable, line reflexed over the back also or. Sinister: A wyvern the wings erect gules, collared as the dexter. Motto Dieu defend le droit (God defend the right).

== See also ==
- Duke of Marlborough
- Earl Spencer
