= Francis Spencer, 1st Baron Churchill =

British politician

The Right Honourable The Lord Churchill DCL FRS
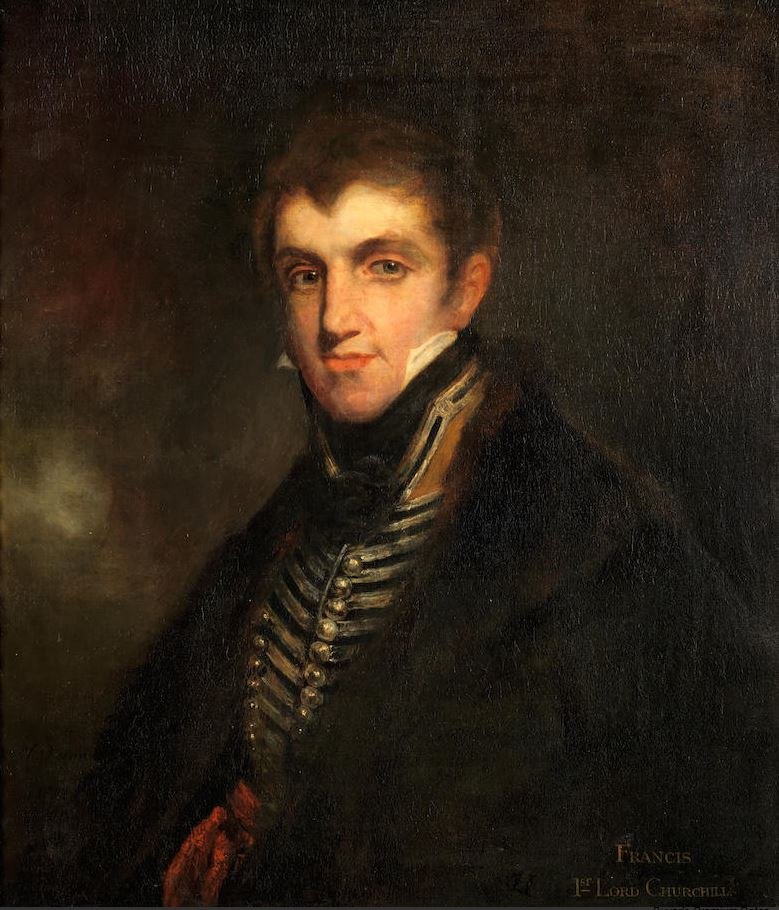
- Francis Spencer, later 1st Baron Churchill (1779–1845) (after William Owen)

Member of Parliament for Oxfordshire
- In office 1801–1815 Serving with John Fane
- Preceded by: Lord Charles Spencer; John Fane
- Succeeded by: John Fane; William Ashurst

Personal details
- Born: Lord Francis Almeric Spencer; 26 December 1779
- Died: 7 March 1845 (aged 65)
- Party: Whig
- Spouse: Lady Frances FitzRoy (after 1800)
- Parent(s): George Spencer, 4th Duke of Marlborough; Lady Caroline Russell

Military service
- Branch/service: British Army
- Rank: Lieutenant-Colonel
- Battles/wars: Napoleonic Wars

Francis Almeric Spencer, 1st Baron Churchill DCL FRS (26 December 1779 – 7 March 1845) was a British peer and Whig politician from the Spencer family.

== Early life ==
Born Lord Francis Almeric Spencer, he was the second youngest of the 4th Duke of Marlborough, and his wife, Lady Caroline Russell. Among his siblings were Lady Caroline Spencer (wife of Henry Agar-Ellis, 2nd Viscount Clifden), Lady Elizabeth Spencer (who married their cousin John Spencer, a grandson of the 3rd Duke of Marlborough), George Spencer-Churchill, 5th Duke of Marlborough, Lady Charlotte Spencer (wife of Rev. Edward Nares), Lord Henry John Spencer, Lady Anne Spencer (wife of Cropley Ashley-Cooper, 6th Earl of Shaftesbury), and Lady Amelia Spencer (wife of Henry Pytches Boyce).

His paternal grandparents were Charles Spencer, 3rd Duke of Marlborough, and the former Hon. Elizabeth Trevor (a daughter of Thomas Trevor, 2nd Baron Trevor). Among his paternal family were aunts Lady Diana Beauclerk and Lady Elizabeth Spencer. His maternal grandparents were John Russell, 4th Duke of Bedford (the British Ambassador to France), and, his second wife, the former Gertrude Leveson-Gower (eldest daughter of John Leveson-Gower, 1st Earl Gower). Among his maternal family was uncle Francis Russell, Marquess of Tavistock and his first cousins, Francis Russell, 5th Duke of Bedford, and John Russell, 6th Duke of Bedford.

== Career ==
From 1801 to 1815, he was Member of Parliament (MP) for Oxfordshire and on his retirement from the Commons, was raised to the peerage as Baron Churchill, of Wychwood in the County of Oxford.

During the Napoleonic Wars he raised a Troop of volunteer cavalry in Oxford and was appointed its Captain on 3 November 1803 After the wars the independent troops in the county were consolidated into the North Western Oxfordshire Regiment of Yeomanry, with Spencer (now Lord Churchill) as Lieutenant-Colonel.

== Personal life ==
Lord Churchill married Lady Frances FitzRoy, daughter of Augustus FitzRoy, 3rd Duke of Grafton, on 25 November 1800. Together, they were the parents of:

- Francis George Spencer, 2nd Baron Churchill (1802–1886), who married Lady Jane Conyngham, daughter of Gen. Sir Francis Conyngham, 2nd Marquess Conyngham, in 1849.
- Lt.-Col. Hon. George Augustus Spencer (1804–1877), who married Charlotte Munro, daughter of Maj.-Gen. John Munro, in 1834.
- Hon. Caroline Elizabeth Spencer (1805–1864), who married Robert Dillon, 3rd Baron Clonbrock, son of Luke Dillon, 2nd Baron Clonbrock, in 1830.
- Hon. General Sir Augustus Almeric Spencer (1807–1893), who married Helen Maria Campbell, daughter of Lt.-Gen. Sir Archibald Campbell, 1st Baronet, in 1836.
- Hon. William Henry Spencer (1810–1900), a clergyman who married Elizabeth Rose Thornhill, daughter of Thomas Thornhill, in 1838. After her death, he married Louisa Mercer Call, daughter of Sir William Call, 2nd Baronet, in 1852. After her death, he married Anna Maria Cowley Sheppard, daughter of John Horton Sheppard, in 1893.
- Hon. Robert Charles Henry Spencer (1817–1881), a Colonel who married Lady Louisa Spencer-Churchill, daughter of George Spencer-Churchill, 6th Duke of Marlborough, in 1845.
- Hon. Charles Frederic Octavius Spencer (1824–1895), the Vicar at Sutton, Buteshire, who married Hester Eliza Fardell, daughter of Rev. Henry Fardell, in 1847.
- Hon. Elizabeth Spencer (d. 1858), who married Rev. Havilland de Sausmarez, son of Thomas de Sausmarez, in 1850.

He died in 1845 and was succeeded by his eldest son, Francis.

His fourth son, Hon. Rev. William Henry Spencer, married Elizabeth Rose Thornhill in January 1838. Their daughter, Isabella Elizabeth Spencer (later Griffin), married Barrister-at-law Marten Harcourt Griffin Esq (Grandson of Captain William Sandey, Royal Navy (Trafalgar)).

== Arms ==
Coat of arms of Baron Churchill
Crest Out of a ducal Coronet or, a griffin’s head between two Wings expanded argent, gorged with a bar gemel gules, armed gold. Escutcheon Quarterly: 1st & 4th, quarterly argent and gules, in the second and third quarters charged with a fret or, over all on a bend sable with three escallops argent (Spencer); 2nd & 3rd, Sable, a lion rampant argent, on a canton of the last, a cross gules (Churchill). Supporters Dexter: A griffin wings erect per fess argent and or gorged with a collar of the last, thereon three escallops sable, line reflexed over the back also or. Sinister: A wyvern the wings erect gules, collared as the dexter. Motto Dieu defend le droit (God defend the right).

== Honours ==
Mount Churchill in British Columbia, Canada, was named in his honor in 1860 by Sir George Henry Richards.

Parliament of the United Kingdom
Preceded by Lord Charles Spencer; John Fane	Member of Parliament for Oxfordshire; 1801–1815; With: John Fane	Succeeded by John Fane; William Ashurst
Peerage of the United Kingdom
New creation	Baron Churchill; 1815–1845	Succeeded by Francis George Spencer
