= Francis Jenison =

British landowner

Count Francis von Jenison zu Walworth (né Francis Jenison) JP (20 January 1732 – 30 June 1799), was a British landowner who settled in the Electoral Palatinate.

== Early life ==
Jenison was born on 20 January 1732 in Edinburgh, Scotland, and was baptised into a prominent English Catholic family at Heighington in County Durham. He was a son of John Jenison (d. 1759) and Elizabeth (née Sandford) Jenison (d. 1773) of Low Walworth, in County Durham. His brothers John and James both became a Jesuit priests and Francis inherited the family estate.

His paternal grandparents were John Jenison (a great-grandson of Thomas Jenison of Walworth Castle and Sir Thomas Gerard of Bryn) and Sarah (née Williams) Jenison, of Hereford. His maternal grandfather was Francis Sandford of Twemlow.

== Career ==
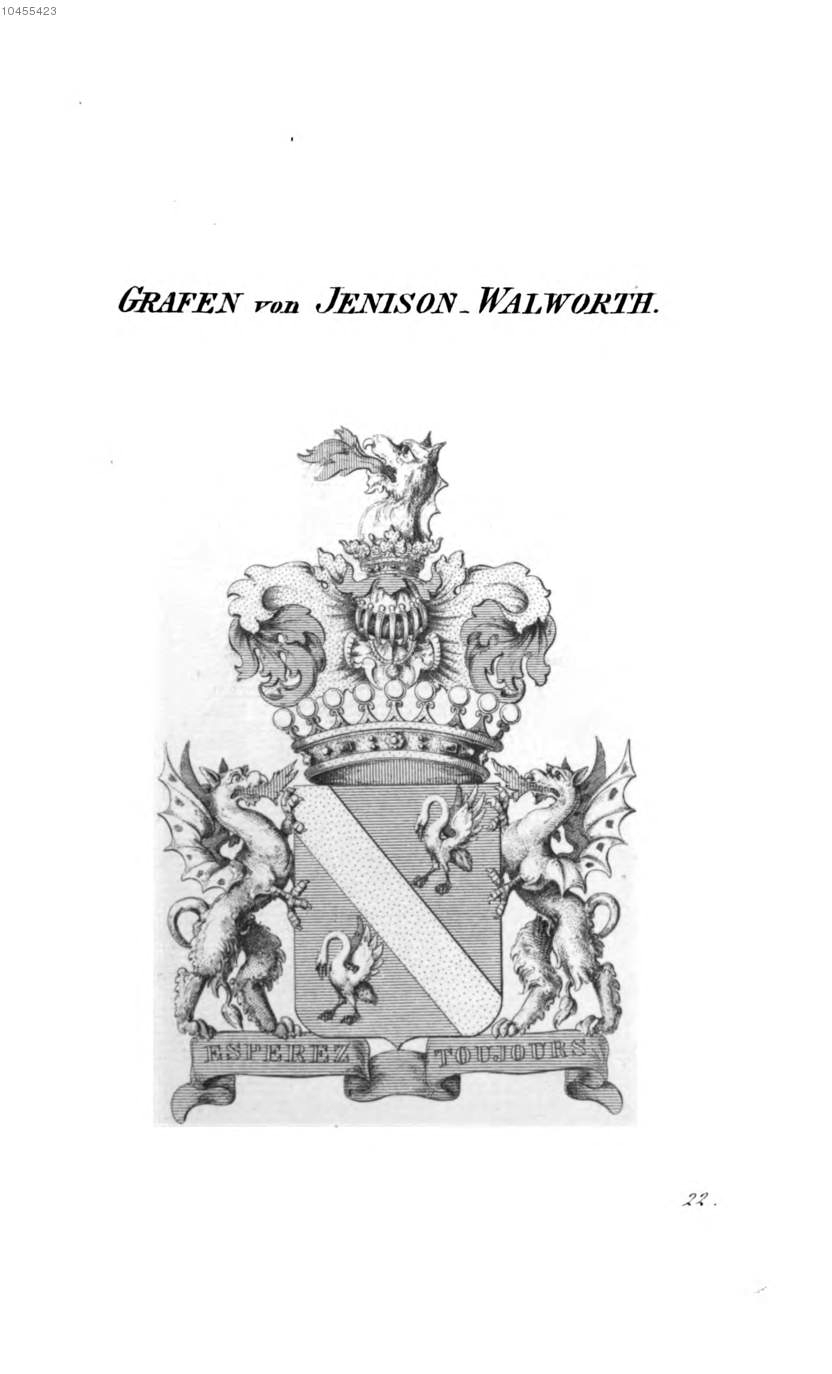
Coat of arms of the Counts von Jenison-Walworth

Jenison served as a Justice of the Peace of County Durham and was an officer in the Dragoons. He sold the family estate, Low Walworth, and retired to the continent, settling in Heidelberg in 1775 where he became Chamberlain to the Elector Palatine Prince Charles Theodore (who also became Elector of Bavaria in 1777 upon the death of his 12th cousin, once removed, Prince Maximilian III Joseph).

In 1791, he was made a Count of the Holy Roman Empire.

== Personal life ==
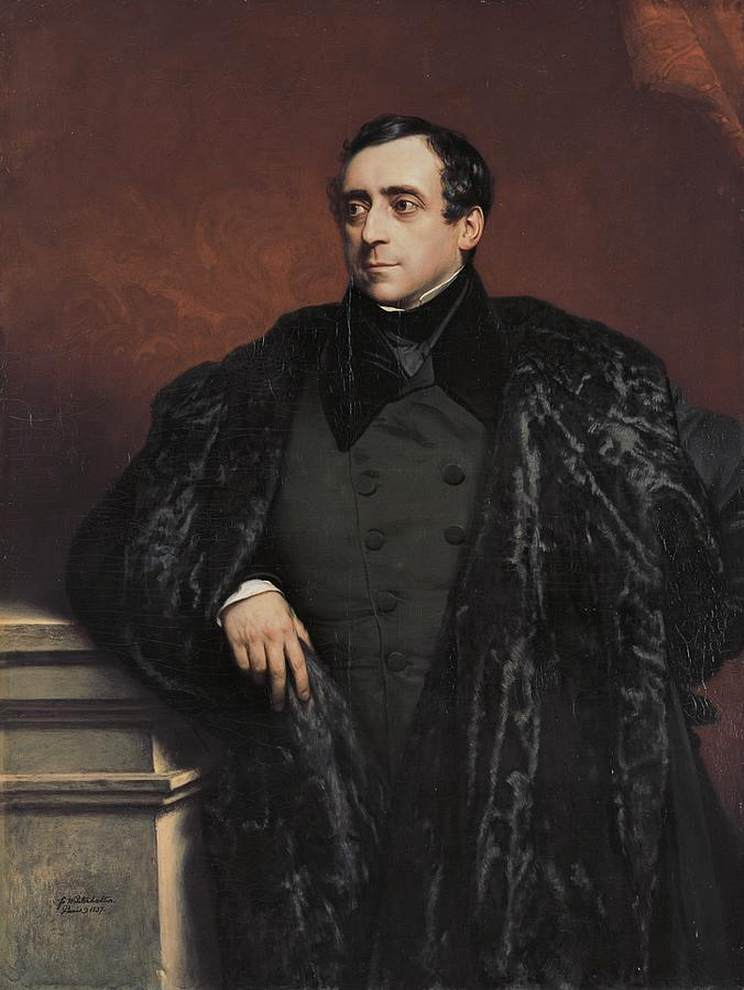
Portrait of his grandson, Count Franz Oliver von Jenison-Walworth, by Franz Xaver Winterhalter, 1837

On 10 September 1758, Jenison was married to Charlotte Smith (1744–1803), the London born daughter of Alexander Smith. Together, they lived in the family mansion at Low Walworth and were the parents of:

- Charlotte Jenison (b. 1759), who married Count Alexander Zimmermann, a Lt.-Gen. in the Neapolitan Army.
- Francis Jenison (b. 1760), a twin who died in infancy.
- Henry Jenison (b. 1760), a twin who died in infancy.
- Harriet Jenison (b. 1761)
- Francis "Franz" von Jenison-Walworth (1764–1824), who served as Chamberlain to the King of Württemberg; he married Baroness Charlotte von Cornet. They divorced and he married Anne Mary Beauclerk, a daughter of Topham Beauclerk (a great-grandson of King Charles II) and Lady Diana Spencer (a daughter of the 3rd Duke of Marlborough), in 1797. Before their marriage, Mary had four sons with her half-brother, George St John, 3rd Viscount Bolingbroke.
- John Jenison (b. 1765), who died young.
- Winifred Jenison (b. 1767), who married Count Alexander von Westerholt.
- Octavia von Jenison-Walworth (c. 1769–1820), who married Dutch Baron François van Zuylen van Nievelt, who had settled in Bavaria; she became lady-in-waiting to the Duchess of Zweibrücken and the Princess of Thurn und Taxis.
- Susan von Jenison-Walworth (1770–1839), who married Count Franz von Spreti, son of Count Sigismund von Spreti (a son of Count Hieronymus von Spreti and Baroness Maria Caroline Charlotte von Ingenheim). After his death in 1791, she married William Robert Spencer, the younger son of Lord Charles Spencer (a younger son of the 3rd Duke of Marlborough), in 1791.
- Frances Clementina Jenison (b. 1772), who died unmarried.
- Catherine Jenison (b. 1773), who died in infancy.
- Rudolf von Jenison-Walworth (b. 1776)
- Carl Friedrich von Jenison-Walworth (1777–1843)
- Carl Theodor von Jenison-Walworth (1779–1802)

Count von Jenison died in Heidelberg on 30 June 1799. His widow died in Heidelberg on 2 December 1803.

=== Descendants ===
Through his son Franz's first marriage, he was a grandfather of Franz Oliver von Jenison-Walworth (1787–1867), a Bavarian politician and diplomat. Through Franz's second marriage, he was a grandfather of another two boys, only one who survived to adulthood, and four girls, the youngest of whom was Countess Emilie (or Amelia) von Jenison-Walworth, from whom descended the princes of Löwenstein-Wertheim-Freudenberg, and through them, other German royalty.

Through his daughter Susan's second marriage, he was a grandfather of Louisa Georgina Spencer (wife of Edward Joseph Canning), Aubrey Spencer (the first Bishop of Newfoundland), William Spencer (who married Frances Garland), Harriet Caroline Octavia Spencer (who had an illegitimate child with the 6th Duke of Marlborough before marrying her cousin, Karl Theodor von Westerholt), and George Spencer (the second Bishop of Madras who married Harriet Theodora Hobhouse, daughter of Sir Benjamin Hobhouse, 1st Baronet).
