= George Spencer (bishop) =

British clergy (1799-1866)

The Right Reverend George Spencer DD
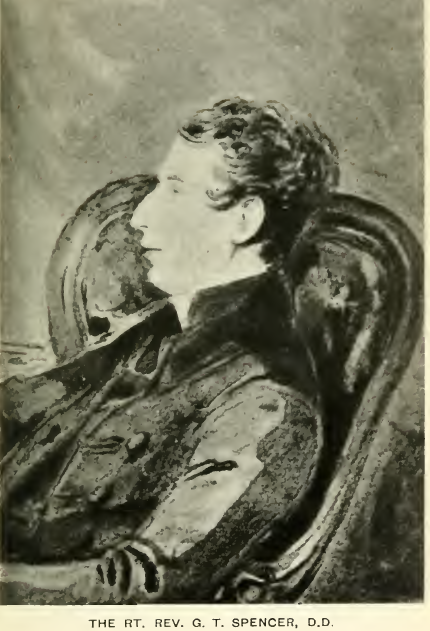
- Spencer from Frank Penny's Book 'The Church in Madras, Volume III, 1922

Bishop of Madras
- In office 1837–1849
- Preceded by: Daniel Corrie
- Succeeded by: Thomas Dealtry

Personal details
- Born: George John Trevor Spencer; 11 December 1799
- Died: 16 July 1866 (aged 66)
- Spouse: Harriet Theodora Hobhouse (m. 1823)
- Relations: Aubrey Spencer (brother)
- Children: 5
- Parent(s): William Robert Spencer; Countess Susan Jenison-Walworth

George John Trevor Spencer (11 December 1799 – 16 July 1866) was an Anglican bishop in the 19th century and a member of the Spencer family.

== Early life ==
Spencer was born on 11 December 1799. He was the son of William Robert Spencer and Countess Susan von Jenison-Walworth. Spencer's brother Aubrey Spencer, became first Bishop of Newfoundland in 1839, then Bishop of Jamaica.

His paternal grandparents were Lord Charles Spencer (a son of Charles Spencer, 3rd Duke of Marlborough) and the former Hon. Mary Beauclerk (a daughter of Adm. Vere Beauclerk, 1st Baron Vere and sister of Aubrey Beauclerk, 5th Duke of St Albans). His maternal grandparents were the former Charlotte Smith and Count Francis von Jenison-Walworth, Chamberlain to the Elector Palatine. His maternal uncle, Count Franz von Jenison-Walworth, married Mary Beauclerk, a daughter of Topham Beauclerk (a great-grandson of King Charles II) and the former Lady Diana Spencer (his maternal grandfather's sister, both children of the 3rd Duke of Marlborough), and served as Chamberlain to the King of Württemberg. Among his cousins were the Bavarian diplomat, Count Franz Oliver von Jenison-Walworth.

He was educated at University College, Oxford, receiving a B.A. in 1822 and an honorary D.D. in 1847.

== Career ==
In 1823 Spencer was made deacon by the Bishop of Lincoln and ordained a priest by the Bishop of Salisbury in 1824. He became Perpetual curate of Buxton until 1829, when he became Rector of Leaden Roding until his appointment as the Bishop of Madras in 1837. The post came through the influence of John Hobhouse, 1st Baron Broughton, his brother-in-law.

Resigning his See in 1849, he was afterwards minister of the Marbœuf Chapel (English Protestant) in Paris; an assistant Bishop of Bath and Wells (4 October 1852 – 10 May 1853) and commissary during Bagot's illness; and then Chancellor of St Paul's Cathedral from 1860. His last post was as Rector of Walton on the Wolds, Leicestershire.

== Personal life ==
In 1823, Spencer married Harriet Theodora Hobhouse (1798–1885), daughter of Sir Benjamin Hobhouse, 1st Baronet and, his second wife, the former Amelia Parry (a daughter of Rev. Joshua Parry). Among her siblings was Joanna Hobhouse who married Rev. Frederick Adrian Scrope Fane (a son of John Fane, MP) They had two sons and three daughters, including:

- Theodora Amelia Mary Spencer (1824–1848), who married Judge of the High Court, Madras, Hatley Frere, son of James Hatley Frere, in 1840.
- Susan Ann Sophia Churchill Spencer (1829–1866), who married Rev. Robert Kerr Hamilton in 1845.
- William Cavendish Spencer (1829–1860), who was in the Bengal Civil Service and married Patience Caroline Hannyngton, daughter of Col. John Caulfield Hannyngton, in 1858.
- Almeric John Spencer (1834–1864), a Reverend married his cousin, Isabella Elizabeth Fane, daughter Joanna (née Hobhouse) Fane, in 1857.
- Emily Joanna Elphinstone Spencer (1841–1927), who died unmarried.

Spencer died on 16 July 1866.

Church of England titles
Preceded by Daniel Corrie	Bishop of Madras; 1837–1849	Succeeded by Thomas Dealtry
