= Franz von Jenison-Walworth =

Count Franz von Jenison-Walworth (née Francis Jenison) (8 February 1764 – 28 April 1824) was a British-born Bavarian soldier, diplomat, and court official.

== Early life ==
He was born as Francis Jenison in Heighington, County Durham, on 8 February 1764. He was the son of Charlotte (née Smith) (1744–1803) and Francis Jenison of Walworth. Among his siblings were Countess Charlotte von Jenison-Walworth (wife of Lt.-Gen. Count Alexander Zimmermann), Countess Winifred von Jenison-Walworth (wife of Count Alexander von Westerholt), Countess Octavia von Jenison-Walworth (wife of Baron François van Zuylen van Nievelt), and Countess Susan von Jenison-Walworth (wife of Count Franz von Spreti and William Robert Spencer).

His maternal grandfather was Alexander Smith of London. His paternal grandparents were John Jenison and Elizabeth (née Sandford) Jenison. Through his sister Susan's second marriage, he was uncle to, among others, Aubrey Spencer, the first Bishop of Newfoundland, and George Spencer, the second Bishop of Madras.

== Career ==
In 1775, his father sold their Durham estate and moved the whole family to Heidelberg, where he shortly became Chamberlain to the Elector Palatine Prince Charles Theodore (who also became Elector of Bavaria in 1777) and was made a Count of the Holy Roman Empire in 1791.

After arriving in Heidelberg, Franz became, successively, a Page of Honour, and Colonel of the Guards to the Elector Palatine, afterwards "Colonel in the service of Hesse-Darmstadt, from which Court at the commencement of the war in 1793, and when the Princes of Germany were subsidized by Great Britain, he was appointed Envoy to the Court of St. James, and was entrusted with the negotiations which ensued respecting the continuance of Hessian troops in the English pay, and concluded with the late Marquis of Hertford, then Earl of Yarmouth, by which the stipulated contingents to the first coalition of the Continental States against Revolutionary France, was regulated and detailed."

After Prince Frederick I (later King of Württemberg) married Charlotte, Princess Royal (the eldest daughter of King George III) in 1797, Franz was selected for the office of Grand Chamberlain of the Household at Stuttgart, a "station to which the superiority of his polished manners and refined address peculiarly qualified him." He served as Frederick I's Chamberlain until the death of the King in 1816.

== Personal life ==
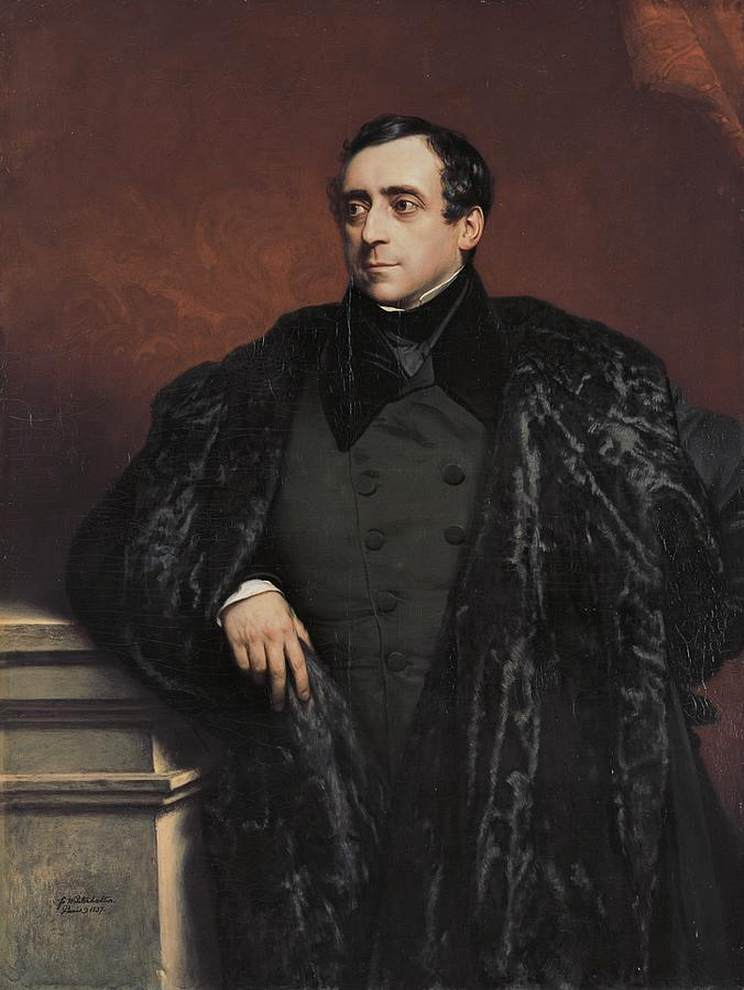
Portrait of his son, Count Franz Oliver von Jenison-Walworth, by Franz Xaver Winterhalter, 1837

He married Baroness Charlotte von Cornet (1766–1864). Before their divorce, they were the parents of:

- Franz Oliver von Jenison-Walworth (1787–1867), a Bavarian politician and diplomat; he married Countess Amalia Batthyány, older sister of Count Lajos Batthyány (the first Prime Minister of Hungary), in 1824. They divorced and she married his cousin, Count Karl Theodor von Westerholt und Gysenberg, in 1831.

After his divorce, he married the British-born Anne Mary Beauclerk (1766–1851) on 29 June 1797 in Heidelberg. She was a daughter of celebrated wit Topham Beauclerk (a great-grandson of King Charles II) and Lady Diana Spencer (a daughter of the 3rd Duke of Marlborough). Before their marriage, Mary had four illegitimate sons, Charles, Edward, George and Robert Barton, with her half-brother, George St John, 3rd Viscount Bolingbroke. From their marriage, however, they had two boys, only one who survived to adulthood, and four girls, including:

- Mary Caroline von Jenison-Walworth (b. 1800), who was born in London.
- Charlotte Christine von Jenison-Walworth (b. 1804), who was born in Dresden.
- Christiane Mary Emilie von Jenison-Walworth (1806–1880), a painter who married Count Karl Heinrich Alban von Schönburg-Forderglauchau, in 1824.
- Karl Friedrich von Jenison-Walworth (1809–1870), who married his brother-in-law's sister, Jeromia Katharina von Schönburg-Forderglauchau, in 1836. After her death in 1843, he married Ellen Mitchell, daughter of James Mitchell and sister to the Baroness de Grothusen, in 1849.

Count Franz died in Heidelberg on 28 April 1824. His widow died in the Neuenheim section of Heidelberg in 1851.

=== Descendants ===
Through his youngest daughter Emilie, descended the princes of Löwenstein-Wertheim-Freudenberg, and through them, other German royalty, From Emilie's daughter Countess Olga von Schönburg-Glauchau who married Prince Wilhelm of Löwenstein-Wertheim-Freudenberg
