= Alexander von Westerholt =

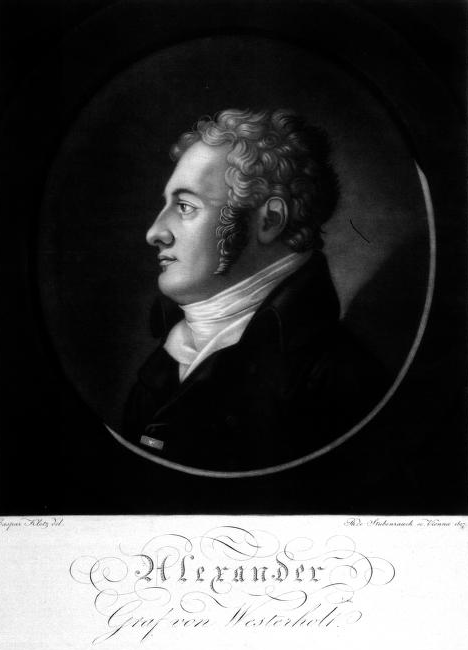
Alexander, Count von Westerholt

Count Alexander Ferdinand von Westerholt (1763 – 1827) was a Bavarian statesman and scholar.

== Early life ==
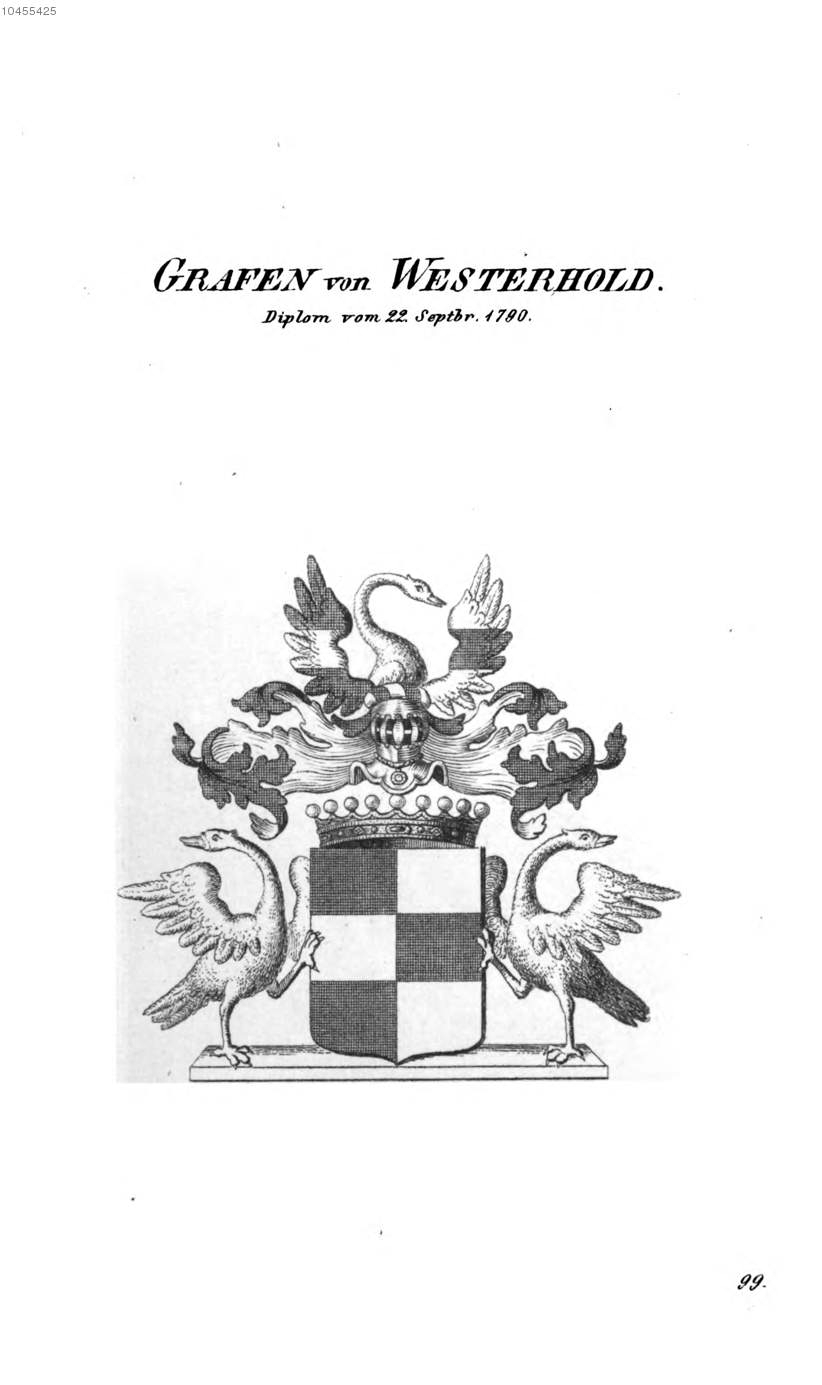
Coat of arms of the Counts of Westerholt

Westerhold was born in the Free Imperial City of Regensburg in 1763. He was the son of Johann Jakob von Westerholt (1727–1814), who had been born in Koblenz and had inherited the position of postmaster. In 1755, he became Hofmarschall (essentially Chamberlain) for Alexander Ferdinand, 3rd Prince of Thurn and Taxis in Regensburg before becoming President of the Court Economy. He was also Electoral Treasurer of the Electorate of Trier and Cologne. He was raised Imperial vicar to the Imperial count by Charles Theodore, Elector of Bavaria in Munich in 1790.

His paternal grandparents were Johann Karl Albert von Westerholt, who owned the Vilckrath estate in the Duchy of Berg through his mother.

== Career ==
Westerholt was a Privy Councilor and statesman who served as vice president of the government during the Napoleonic Wars. He was also a scholar who served as chief librarian. He was based in Regensburg when it was the permanent seat of the Imperial Diet. In April 1803, Regensburg was mediatised to the new Principality of Regensburg before being ceded to the Kingdom of Bavaria by the Treaty of Paris in 1810. Letters between Westerholt and Jesuit theologian Johann Michael Sailer were published by the Regensburg diocese.

Reportedly, he was a member of the Illuminati under the code name Montaigne/Themistocles.

== Personal life ==
He married English born Countess Winifred von Jenison-Walworth (1767–1825), a daughter of Count Francis Jenison of Walworth who moved his family to the Electoral Palatinate. Among her siblings were Count Franz von Jenison-Walworth (whose second wife, Mary Beauclerk, was a daughter of Topham Beauclerk and Lady Diana Spencer) and Countess Susan von Jenison-Walworth (wife of Count Franz von Spreti and William Robert Spencer). Together, they were the parents of:

- Karl Theodor von Westerholt (1795–1863), who married his cousin, Harriet Caroline Octavia Spencer, daughter of William Robert Spencer, in 1819. Harriet, who had an illegitimate child with the 6th Duke of Marlborough before marrying him, died in 1831 and he married the wealthy Hungarian Countess Amalia von Jenison-Walworth (née Batthyány), the former wife of his cousin, Count Franz Oliver von Jenison-Walworth, in 1831. Amalia was the older sister of Count Lajos Batthyány (the first Prime Minister of Hungary). After his second marriage to Amalia, he retired to Giebelbach near Lindau on Lake Constance.

Count von Westerhold died in Regensburg 1827.

=== Descendants ===
Through his son Karl, he was a grandfather of Heinrich Friedrich von Westerholt (1820–1859), an Officer in the Austrian Army who married Countess Sophia von Stainlein-Saalenstein (sister of the composer Ludwig von Stainlein-Saalenstein).
