= Aubrey Spencer =

English bishop (1795–1872)

Aubrey George Spencer
- Bishop of Jamaica
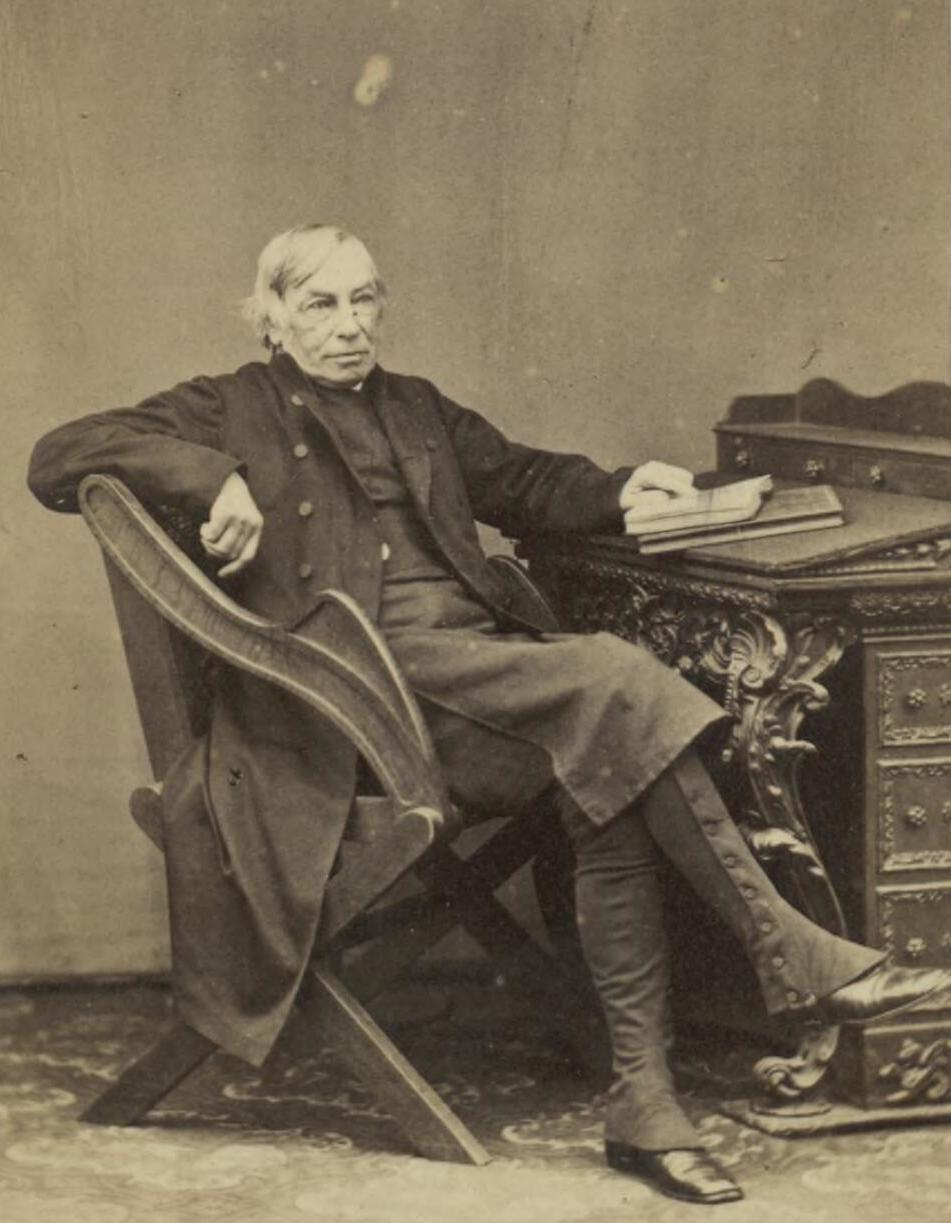
- Church: modern day Church in the Province of the West Indies
- See: Jamaica
- In office: 1843–1855
- Previous post(s): Newfoundland and Bermuda

Orders
- Ordination: 1819

Personal details
- Born: 8 February 1795; London, England
- Died: 24 February 1872 (aged 77); Torquay, Devon, England.

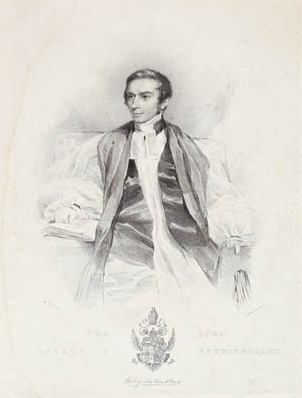
A lithograph of Spencer, with his coat of arms

Aubrey George Spencer (8 February 1795 – 24 February 1872) was the first bishop of the Anglican Diocese of Newfoundland and Bermuda (1839–1843). He was also bishop of Jamaica. His brother George Spencer became Bishop of Madras. He is from the Spencer family.

== Life ==
Aubrey George Spencer was born in London, England on 8 February 1795. He was the son of William Spencer (1769–1834), younger son of Lord Charles Spencer, and a great-grandson of Charles Spencer, 3rd Duke of Marlborough; his German mother Susan being a Countess of the Holy Roman Empire. Among his cousins were the Bavarian diplomat, Count Franz Oliver von Jenison-Walworth (son of his uncle, Count Franz von Jenison-Walworth).

Spencer was educated at St Albans School, and privately in Greenwich prior to joining the navy. His health failed him and he was discharged and decided to become a priest. Spencer went to study at Magdalen Hall, Oxford and was made deacon in 1818. He was ordained a priest in 1819 by the Bishop of Norwich. Spencer's first assignment was officiating as a curate at Prittlewell, Essex, before becoming a Society for the Propagation of the Gospel missionary to Newfoundland. There he served at Ferryland and Trinity Bay before the cold undermined his health and he moved to Bermuda, marrying Bermudian Eliza Musson in 1832.

Having been appointed Archdeacon and Rector of Paget and Warwick, he published a collection of his sermons, acquired a Lambeth D.D. and turned down in 1829 the offer of the Archdeaconry of Newfoundland. In 1839, he readily accepted when, perhaps helped by his aristocratic and Whig connections, he was offered the bishopric of Newfoundland. He was consecrated Bishop of Newfoundland and Bermuda, alongside John Strachan, who was the first Bishop of Toronto. Their consecration took place at the chapel in Lambeth Palace of 4 August 1839. William Howley, being archbishop of Canterbury, with Bishops Charles James Blomfield of London, William Otter of Chichester, and John Inglis of Nova Scotia participated in Spencer's consecration.

=== Bishop of Newfoundland ===
In Newfoundland, he increased the number of clergy by offering stipends guaranteed by the Society for the Propagation of the Gospel, built schools and new churches, and laid the foundation stone for a cathedral. He reorganised the church into rural deaneries, revived the Diocesan Church Society to raise money, and formed a Theological Institute to produce a local ministry. To increase the number of clergy he ordained schoolmasters belonging to the Newfoundland School Society. He obtained control of that society by becoming a Vice-President, licensing its schoolmasters (if not ordained) to act as lay readers, and appointed the Rev. T. F. H. Bridge, his ablest assistant, to act as its local Superintendent. He described the society, in its 21st Annual Report, as "the greatest bulwark of the Protestant faith in that dreary and benighted land".

Spencer was described by Prowse, the 19th century Newfoundland historian, as "an evangelical of the old school of Wilberforce and Bickersteth." He had little time for dissent, and the Methodists were quick to attack his making the Newfoundland School Society an auxiliary of the church, accusing him of having "high and exclusive claims", and of influencing the younger generation and "infusing into their minds the common notions of the high church party". They were surprised that Spencer's Anglicanism, although low church, did not favour them. Had they read his sermon preached in St John's, they would have realised that not only was he very anti-Tractarian and anti-Catholic, he also insisted on the Church of England having its ministry from the Apostles and condemned those who rejected forms and undervalued the sacraments. Part of Spencer's legacy to his successor, Edward Feild, was thus rather poor relations with the Methodists.

=== Final years ===
He was once again troubled by ill health and in consequence obtained his translation to Jamaica where he was bishop until 1855. He then retired to England, to Torquay, and he occasionally assisted the ageing Bishop of Exeter, Phillpotts. His last publication, A Brief Account of the Church of England, its Faith and Worship: as shown by the Book of Common Prayer, published in 1867, was circulated in Spanish and Italian by the Anglo-Continental Society, and was a decidedly Protestant work. It declared that the reformers had aimed to maintain apostolic succession, that the Church of England was merely a part or branch of the catholic Church of Christ, that all other Christians in England were in error, that Auricular Confession was inadmissible in the Church of England, that there should be no adoration of the consecrated bread and wine at communion, and that a branch of the Church without bishops was still a church. It was very traditional and very Protestant. His long illness caught up with him and in 1872 Spencer died.

== See also ==
- List of people of Newfoundland and Labrador

Church of England titles
New diocese	Bishop of Newfoundland; 1839–1843	Succeeded by Edward Feild
Preceded by Christopher Lipscomb	Bishop of Jamaica; 1843–1855	Succeeded by Reginald Courtenay
