= Charles George Beauclerk =

British Member of Parliament (1774–1845)

Charles George Beauclerk (20 January 1774 – 25 December 1845) was an English politician who served as Member of Parliament (MP) for the borough of Richmond from 1796 to 1798.

== Background and education ==
He was the only son of Topham Beauclerk and Lady Diana Spencer, Lady of the Bedchamber to Queen Charlotte. He had two half-brothers by his mother's first marriage to Frederick St John, 2nd Viscount Bolingbroke, namely George St John, 3rd Viscount Bolingbroke, and General Frederick St John. He had twin elder sisters: Elisabeth Beauclerk, who married their cousin George Herbert, 11th Earl of Pembroke, and (Anne) Mary Day Beauclerk, who famously had a long-term relationship with their half-brother Bolingbroke, resulting in several children.

After being educated at Eton (1782) and Christ Church, Oxford (1790), Charles Beauclerk went on a Grand Tour in 1794. He was a member of Brooks's and the Whig Club.

== Career ==
On his return from the Continent, Beauclerk paid £5000 for the constituency of Richmond in 1796, but his shyness held him back, and he is not known to have spoken in Parliament.

A friend of Lord Holland, his natural political affiliation was with the Whigs and during his two years in Parliament, sitting for Lord Dundas's borough of Richmond, he voted steadily with opposition and for Grey's parliamentary reform motion, 26 May 1797. Like other Foxite seceders he returned to oppose the assessed taxes, 14 Dec. 1797, 4 Jan., and the conduct of Irish affairs, 22 June 1798.

Beauclerk "took the Chiltern Hundreds" (i.e. resigned as an MP) in 1798, having sat as an opposition MP for just two years.

== Marriage and family ==
At Holland House the political hostess and saloniere Elizabeth Fox, Baroness Holland, introduced him to Emily Charlotte "Mimie" Ogilvie (May 1778–22 January 1832), daughter of William Ogilvie and Emily FitzGerald, Duchess of Leinster. Much to the delight of Lady Holland and Beauclerk's friend Lord Holland, the couple married a month later. Emily W. Sunstein, an American biographer of Mary Shelley, describes Charles Beauclerk as a "shy intellectual" and the marriage as "incompatible"

In 1803 he built his family seat, St Leonard's Lodge, in Sussex. Neighbours included Timothy Shelley at Field Place and Thomas Medwin at Horsham. The Beauclerks circa 1820 travelled en famille to the Continent. Charles took the boys to Geneva, while Emily supervised the girls in Pisa. Percy Bysshe Shelley and Mary Shelley had made their home in the Italian city, and Emily tried to persuade Percy to come to her soirees, an experience which he did not want to repeat until she called on Mary. Medwin, on the other hand, who was seeking a wealthy wife, was happy to attend her sociable evenings. He introduced her to Lord Byron (at both their requests). Claire Clairmont said Medwin and Emily Beauclerk were the two biggest gossips in Pisa - on which anecdotes Medwin based his Conversations with Byron (1824). Edward Ellerker Williams wrote to Edward John Trelawny, attempting to draw him to Pisa:

There is a Mrs. B. here, with a litter of seven daughters, she is the gayest lady, and the only one who gives dances, for the young squaws are arriving at that age, when as Lord Byron says, they must waltz for their livelihood.

The couple are variously recorded as having three sons and six daughters or seven daughters and six sons. Their eldest son was Aubrey Beauclerk, an MP, with whom the widowed Mary Shelley was said to be romantically involved. Their second son, Charles Robert Beauclerk (1802–72) was a barrister and lived at Dover House, Warningcamp in Sussex, who at the age of forty married the daughter of a Cuban judge half his age, Joaquina de Zamora, who was a Roman Catholic. Their sons were brought up in her religion, two of whom became Jesuit priests and the youngest, William Topham Sidney Beauclerk (1867–1950), married Lola de Peñalver y Zamora (1875–1972), whose only surviving son, Ralph Beauclerk, succeeded as 6th Marquis de Valero de Urría. Another son, George Robert Beauclerk (1803–71), was also an MP. Their daughter Diana Olivia married Sir Francis Fletcher-Vane, 3rd Baronet, of Hutton. Their daughter Georgiana "Gee" Paul was one of Mary Shelley's closest friends. Another daughter Jane Elizabeth Beauclerk Fitzroy (1807 - 1892) became the maternal grandmother of Daisy Greville, Countess of Warwick
