= The Ditchling Carol =

Christmas carol

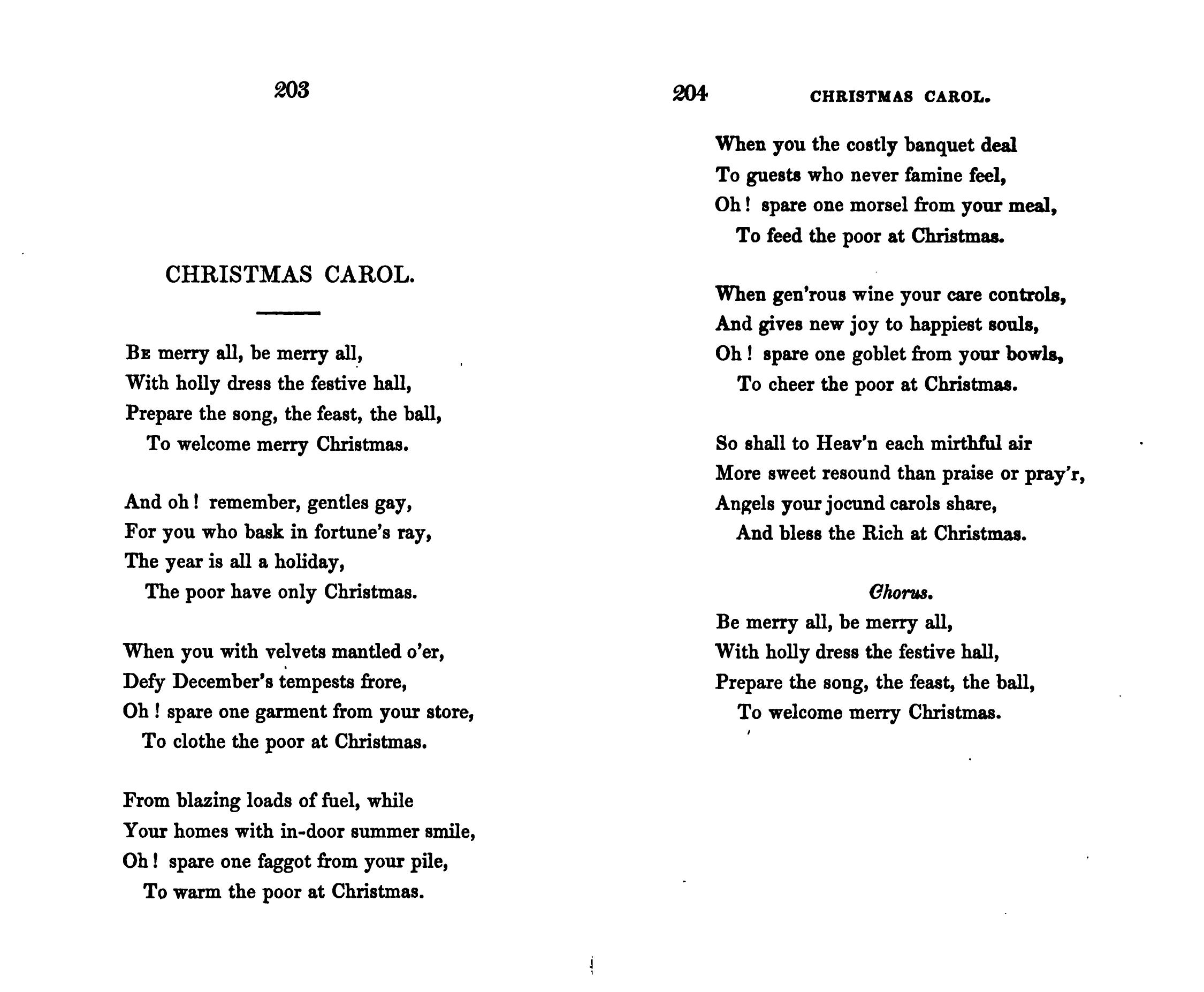
Spencer's original words from an 1835 edition of his collected poems, where they are titled "Christmas Carol". These words would later be set to music as "The Ditchling Carol".

The Ditchling Carol is a Christmas carol and Roud song #3216, with words by William Robert Spencer.

== Recordings ==
In the sleeve notes to the 1999 album Broken Ground by Waterson–Carthy, singer and guitarist Martin Carthy writes:

The Ditchling Carol is nowhere near as old as it might appear at first glance. According to Vic Gammon, “… the music is reputedly the work of a shoemaker and church musician called Peter Parsons who was from Ditchling near Brighton and who died in 1901 … Ditchling was quite a centre for musicians from the old church bands, and the choir itself did quite extensive pre-Christmas carol tours which were apparently very popular but were said to have been frowned on by church reformers who did not like them taking their music to other places …”

In the sleeve notes for the 2011 CD Nowell Sing We, the New Scorpion Band note that the words are by William Robert Spencer and were published in 1811. They say "The setting is by Peter Preston, and the carol as we have it now was collated by Vic Gammon from several Sussex manuscripts. Here we perform it as a 'west gallery' piece."
