= Franz Oliver von Jenison-Walworth =

Bavarian politician and diplomat

Count Franz Oliver von Jenison-Walworth
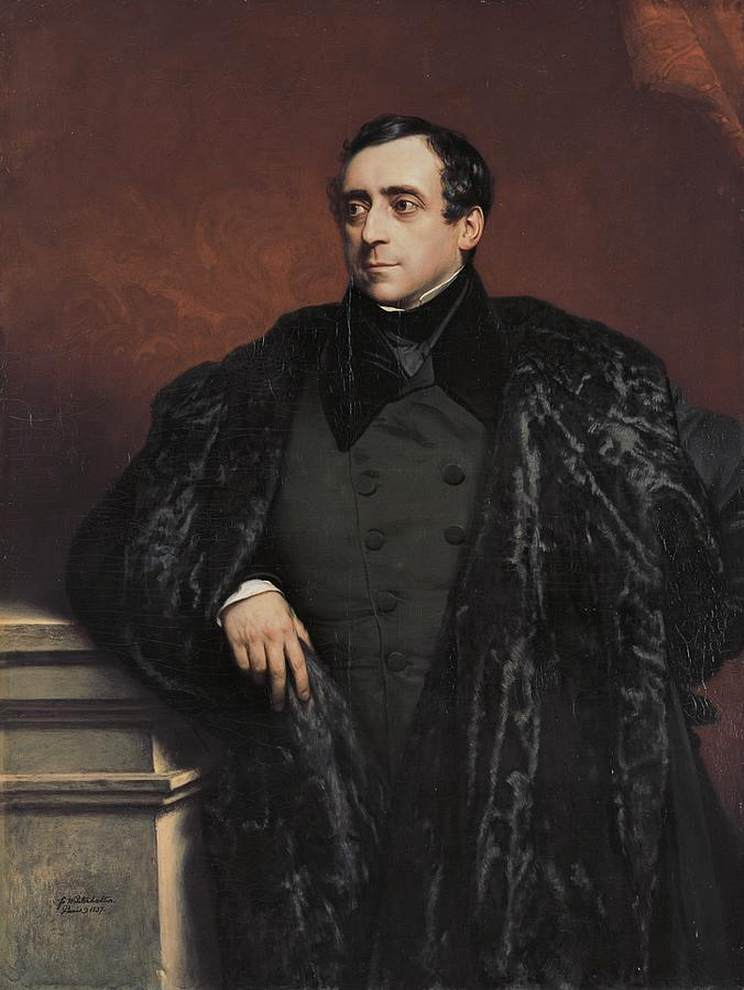
- Portrait of Count von Jenison-Walworth, by Franz Xaver Winterhalter, 1837

Envoy of the Kingdom of Bavaria to the Austrian Empire
- In office 1843–1847
- Monarch: Ludwig I
- Preceded by: Maximilian Emanuel von Lerchenfeld
- Succeeded by: Friedrich von Luxburg

Envoy of the Kingdom of Bavaria to the Russian Empire
- In office 1840–1842
- Monarch: Ludwig I
- Preceded by: Max von und zu Lerchenfeld auf Köfering
- Succeeded by: Otto von Bray-Steinburg

Envoy of the Kingdom of Bavaria to France
- In office 1835–1839
- Monarch: Ludwig I
- Preceded by: Christian Hubert von Pfeffel
- Succeeded by: Friedrich von Luxburg

Envoy of the Kingdom of Bavaria to the Court of St. James
- In office 1833–1835
- Monarch: Ludwig I
- Preceded by: August Baron de Cetto
- Succeeded by: August Baron de Cetto

Envoy of the Kingdom of Bavaria to Belgium
- In office 1824–1826
- Monarch: Maximilian I Joseph
- Succeeded by: Vacant

Personal details
- Born: 6 June 1787; Heidelberg, Electoral Palatinate
- Died: 20 May 1867 (aged 79); Florence, Kingdom of Italy
- Spouse: Countess Amalia Batthyány (m. 1824; div. 1831)
- Relations: Francis Jenison (grandfather)
- Parent(s): Franz von Jenison-Walworth; Charlotte von Cornet

Count Franz Oliver von Jenison-Walworth (9 June 1787 – 20 May 1867) was a Bavarian politician and diplomat.

== Early life ==
He was the only surviving son of the Count Franz von Jenison-Walworth and, his first wife, Baroness Charlotte von Cornet (1766–1864). His parents divorced and his father married Mary Beauclerk in 1797. From his father's marriage to Mary (daughter of Topham Beauclerk and Lady Diana Spencer), he had four half-sisters and a half-brother, including Countess Emilie von Jenison-Walworth (wife of Count Karl Heinrich Alban von Schönburg-Forderglauchau) and Karl Friedrich von Jenison-Walworth (who married Jeromia Katharina von Schönburg-Forderglauchau and Ellen Mitchell).

His paternal grandfather was Baron von Cornet. His paternal grandparents were Count Francis Jenison of Walworth and the former Charlotte Smith, who were English born landowners who relocated to Heidelberg.

== Career ==
Franz began his diplomatic career at the age of 23 as a Bavarian legation secretary in Berlin. In 1811 he was transferred to St. Petersburg where he again served as legation secretary, then on to Paris in 1813 and London in 1814. After the departure of Johann Casimir Häffelin as Maximilian I Joseph's Bavarian envoy for Naples, he became chargé d'affaires for Naples in 1816, residing in Rome. He held the post until 1821 when he reported to the Bavarian government about the impressions that the promulgation of the Bavarian constitutional document to the Roman Curia of 1818. In 1824, the same year he was married, he was appointed Bavarian Envoy to the United Kingdom of the Netherlands at The Hague. He was recalled in the spring of 1826 and temporarily retired.

From 1833 to 1847, during the reign of King Ludwig I he served, successively, as the Bavarian Envoy to the most important courts in Europe. He was appointed the Bavatian Minister to the Court of St. James in London, from 1833 to 1835 (a position his father had held in 1793 as Envoy for Hesse-Darmstadt), then Envoy in Paris from 1835 to 1839, before becoming the Envoy in St. Petersburg from 1840 to 1842. In February 1843, he attended at dinner at Gloucester House held by the Princess Alice, Duchess of Gloucester. (Note: The guests at the Duchess of Gloucester's dinner besides Count Jenison-Walworth were: Prince Adolphus, Duke of Cambridge and the Duchess of Cambridge, Prince George and the Princess Augusta, the Maximilian Karl, 6th Prince of Thurn and Taxis, the Hanoverian Minister, the Earl and Countess of Hardwicke, Count von Stockau, Baron Lebzeltern, Baroness Ahlefeldt, Major Stephens, Lady Georgiana Bathurst, and Capt. Liddell. After the dinner, she had an evening party with the French Ambassador and the Countess de Saint-Aulaire, Count and Countess d'Harcourt, the Russian Minister, Walter Scott, 5th Duke of Buccleuch, the James Gascoyne-Cecil, 2nd Marquess of Salisbury, and Lady Blanche Cecil, the Marquess and Marchioness of Douro, George Villiers, 4th Earl of Clarendon, the Earl and Countess of Haddington, the Earl of Beverley, the Lord and Lady Mahon, Lord and Lady Wharncliffe, and Lady Georgiana Wortley, Lady Robert Grosvenor, Baron Koller, Baron Brénier, Mr. Algernon, Miss Greville, and Mr. Vincent.) His last assignment was the Envoy in Vienna from 1843 to 1874. Upon his retirement in 1847, he moved to Italy, where he spent the rest of his life.

== Personal life ==
In 1824, he married Countess Amalia Batthyány, daughter of Count József Sándor Batthyány von Német-Újvár and Borbála Skerlecz de Lomnicza. She was also the older sister of Count Lajos Batthyány, the first Prime Minister of Hungary. They divorced and she married his cousin, Count Karl Theodor von Westerholt (son of Count Alexander von Westerholt), in 1831.

Count von Jenison-Walworth died in Florence on 20 May 1867.
