= William Robert Spencer =

18th/19th-century English poet

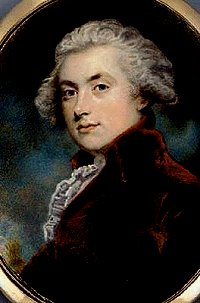
- Born: William Robert Spencer; 9 January 1770; London, England
- Died: 22 October 1834 (aged 64); Paris, France
- Education: Harrow School
- Alma mater: Christ Church, Oxford
- Spouse: Countess Susan Jenison-Walworth (1791–1834)
- Children: 6, including Aubrey, George, William
- Parent(s): Lord Charles Spencer; Mary Beauclerk
- Relatives: Charles Spencer, 3rd Duke of Marlborough (grandfather); Vere Beauclerk, 1st Baron Vere (grandfather)

William Robert Spencer (9 January 1769 – 22/23 October 1834) was an English poet and wit from the Spencer family.

== Early life ==
Spencer was born in Kensington Palace on 9 January 1769. He was the younger son of Lord Charles Spencer and his wife Mary Beauclerk. His eldest brother, Robert Spencer, married Henrietta Fawkener (daughter of Sir Everard Fawkener) and his other brother, John Spencer, married their cousin, Lady Elizabeth Spencer (daughter of George Spencer, 4th Duke of Marlborough). His father was MP for Oxfordshire.

His paternal grandparents were Charles Spencer, 3rd Duke of Marlborough and the former Hon. Elizabeth Trevor (a daughter of Thomas Trevor, 2nd Baron Trevor). His maternal grandfather was Vere Beauclerk, 1st Baron Vere and his uncle was Aubrey Beauclerk, 5th Duke of St Albans.

Spencer was educated at Harrow School and matriculated at Christ Church, Oxford in 1786, though he left the university without receiving a degree.

== Career ==
Spencer's wit made him a popular member of society. He belonged to the Whig set of Charles James Fox and Richard Brinsley Sheridan and was frequently a guest of the prince of Wales. He did not desire a public life, being content as a writer of "occasional" verse and vers de société. In 1796 he published an English version of Bürger's Leonore, and in 1802 he burlesqued German romance in his Urania, which was produced on the stage at Drury Lane. Among his best-known pieces, which were published in a collection of his poems in 1811, were his well-known ballad "Beth Gelert" and "Too Late I Stayed." His writings were greatly appreciated by his contemporaries, being warmly praised by such figures as Sir Walter Scott, John Wilson, and Lord Byron.

Spencer briefly sat in the House of Commons but gave up his seat in 1797 in order to become a commissioner of stamps so as to support his family. He held the post until 1826, surrendering it after moving to Paris the year before because of his financial difficulties. He spent his remaining years in Paris.

== Personal life ==
In 1791 he married Countess Susan von Jenison-Walworth (1770–1834), widow of Count Franz von Spreti and daughter of Charlotte Smith and Count Jenison-Walworth, Chamberlain to the Elector Palatine. Her brother, Count Franz Raugraf von Jenison-Walworth, married Mary Beauclerk, a daughter of Topham Beauclerk (a great-grandson of King Charles II) and his aunt, Lady Diana Spencer), and served as Chamberlain to the King of Württemberg. Together, Susan and William had five sons and two daughters, including:

- Louisa Georgina Spencer (b. 1792), who married Edward Joseph Canning, son of Thomas Canning.
- Aubrey Spencer (1795–1872), who became first Bishop of Newfoundland in 1839, being afterwards translated to the See of Jamaica; he married Eilza Musson, daughter of John Musson, in 1822.
- William Spencer (b. 1796), who married Frances Garland, daughter of John Garland, in 1820.
- Harriet Caroline Octavia Spencer (1798–1831), who had an illegitimate child with George Spencer-Churchill, 6th Duke of Marlborough, but married her cousin, Count Karl Theodor von Westerholt (son of Count Alexander von Westerholt), in 1819.
- George Spencer (1799–1866), who was consecrated the second Bishop of Madras in 1837; he married Harriet Theodora Hobhouse, daughter of Sir Benjamin Hobhouse, 1st Baronet.

Spencer died in Paris in October 1834. His remains were taken back to England and buried in Harrow Church.

== Works ==
- W. R. Spencer, Poems (London, 1835), containing a biographical memoir
- Curry, Charles Madison; Clippinger, Erle Elsworth (1921). "Beth Gêlert; or, the Grave of the Greyhound" poem by William Robert Spencer". Children's Literature. Chicago: Rand McNally. pp. 436–437. ISBN 9781344646789.

== See also ==
- Gelert
- St. Gelert
