= Elizabeth Herbert, Countess of Pembroke =

British noblewoman (1737–1831)

The Right Honourable The Countess of Pembroke
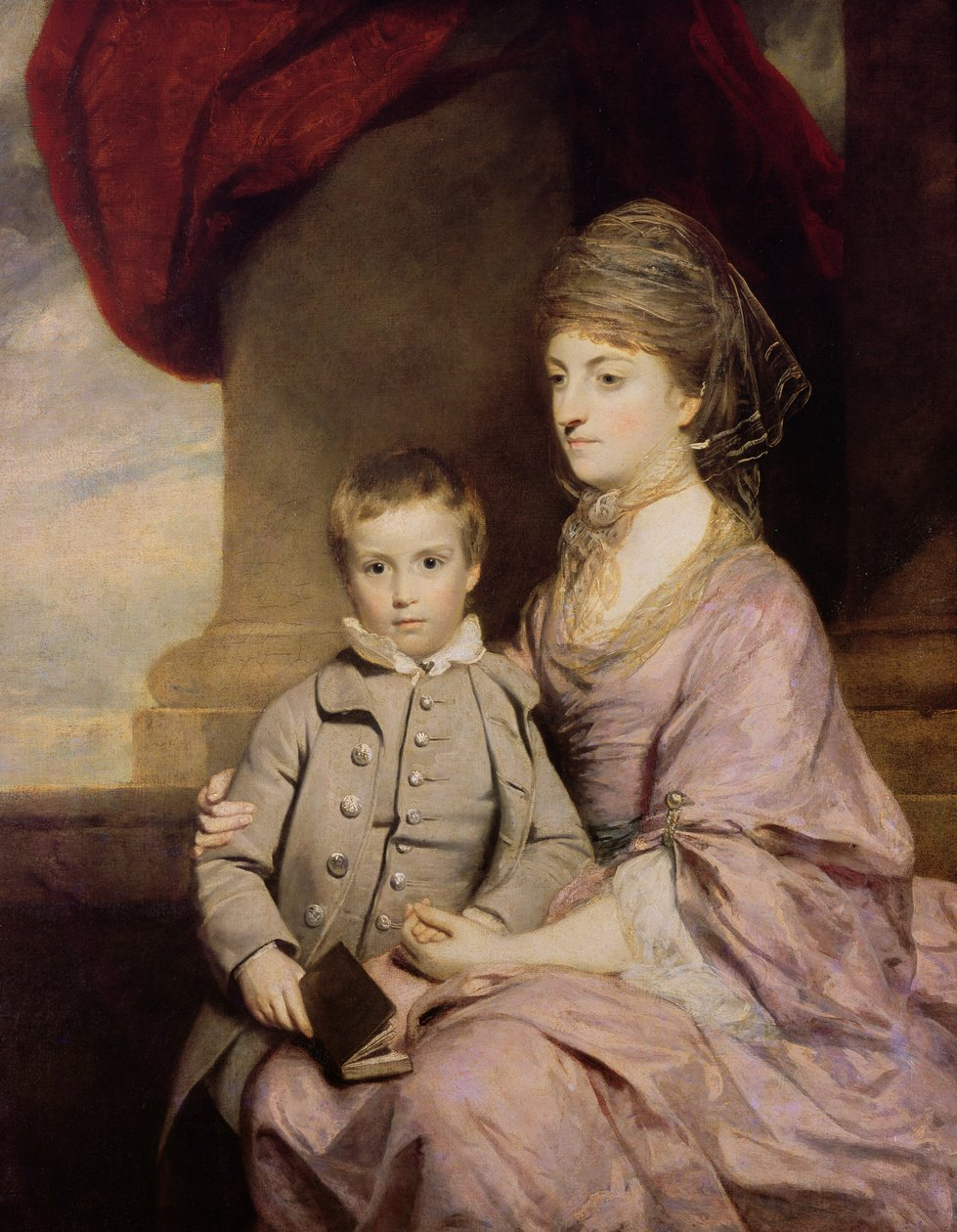
- Portrait of the Countess with her son, George, by Sir Joshua Reynolds (c. 1764–1767)
- Born: January/March 1737
- Died: 30 April 1831 (aged 94)
- Spouse: Henry Herbert, 10th Earl of Pembroke
- Issue: George Herbert, 11th Earl of Pembroke; Charlotte Herbert
- Parents: Charles Spencer, 3rd Duke of Marlborough; Elizabeth Trevor

Elizabeth Herbert, Countess of Pembroke and Montgomery (born Lady Elizabeth Spencer; January/March 1737 – 30 April 1831) was the second daughter of Charles Spencer, 3rd Duke of Marlborough and Elizabeth Trevor.

== Biography ==
Lord Pembroke, Elizabeth's husband

She was born Elizabeth Spencer to Charles Spencer, 3rd Duke of Marlborough and Elizabeth Spencer. Her siblings were George, Charles, and Diana. In 1756, aged 19, she married Henry Herbert, 10th Earl of Pembroke. In 1762, he left her to elope with Kitty Hunter. "Husbands are dreadfull and powerful animals" wrote the long-suffering Elizabeth after reconciling with her husband in 1762. She refused to allow his illegitimate son from that affair to keep the surname Herbert, and she and Henry ended up living in separate quarters at Wilton House (him downstairs, her upstairs).

She was admired by King George III in the early 1760s, becoming a lady of the bedchamber to Queen Charlotte from 1782 onward. The King and Queen stayed for two nights with Henry and Elizabeth at Wilton House in 1778. She eventually moved to Pembroke Lodge in Richmond Park in 1788, which King George had put at her disposal. However, the King – who had been attracted to Elizabeth as long as he had known her – suffered his first bout of insanity that same year, and she had to endure the embarrassment of his sporadic and unwanted attentions until his recovery later that year.

== Issue ==
Name	Birth	Death	Notes
George Augustus Herbert, 11th Earl of Pembroke, 8th Earl of Montgomery	10 September 1759	26 October 1827	He married, firstly in 1787, Elizabeth Beauclerk and had issue; he married, secondly in 1808, Countess Catherine Vorontsova and had issue.
Charlotte Herbert	14 July 1773	21 April 1784	She died from tuberculosis, known then as consumption, aged 10.

== In fiction ==
She features in the movie The Madness of King George (1994) played by Amanda Donohoe. The film is set in 1788, so she was in her early 50s at that time, which is much older than she is portrayed in the film. Its mention of a mother-in-law who "lost her wits" is an invention; her mother-in-law, Mary Fitzwilliam, died in 1769. The King introduces her: "Now, that's Lady Pembroke. Handsome woman, what? Daughter of the Duke of Marlborough. Stuff of generals. Blood of Blenheim. Husband an utter rascal. Eloped in a packet-boat." The movie shows the mad King harassing her, but she (and the Queen) remaining loyal to him.

== Sources ==
- Humphrys family tree
- Henry, Elizabeth and George: Letters and Diaries of Henry, 10th Earl of Pembroke and his Circle (1734–80), 16th Earl, 1939, repub as: The Pembroke Papers vol. I (1734–80), 1942–50.
- The Pembroke Papers vol. II (1780–94), 16th Earl, 1950, [EUL] 9(42073) Pem.

Court offices
Preceded by The Countess of Hertford	Lady of the Bedchamber; 1782–1818	Succeeded by Death of Queen Charlotte
