= George St John, 3rd Viscount Bolingbroke =

British politician (1761-1824)

The Right Honourable The Viscount Bolingbroke
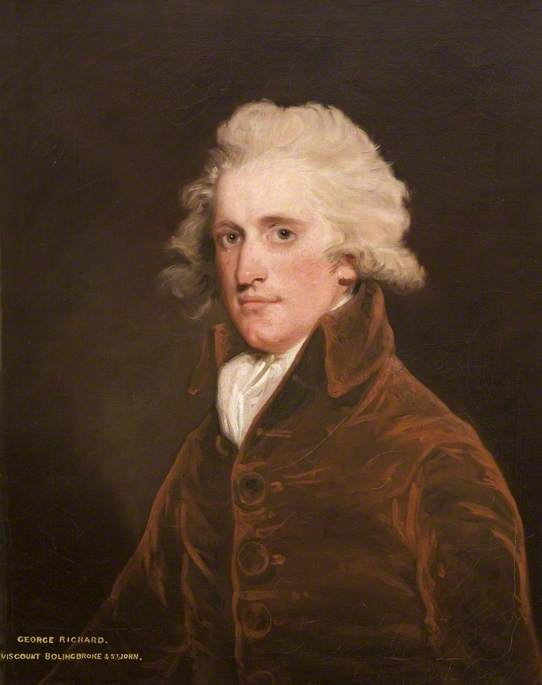
- portrait by John Hoppner

Member of the Great Britain Parliament for Cricklade
- In office 1782–1784 Serving with Paul Benfield
- Preceded by: Paul Benfield; John Macpherson
- Succeeded by: Charles Westley Coxe; Robert Adamson
- Born: George Richard St John; 5 March 1761
- Died: 11 December 1824 (aged 63); Pisa, Italy
- Parents: Frederick St John, 2nd Viscount Bolingbroke (father); Diana Spencer (mother)
- Relatives: Frederick St John (brother)

George Richard St John, 3rd Viscount Bolingbroke (5 March 1761 – 11 December 1824), styled The Honourable George St John from his birth until 1787, was a British politician. He became famous in his own lifetime for embarking on an extra-marital relationship with his own half-sister, Mary Beauclerk (his mother's daughter by her second marriage), that produced four sons. The two lovers had to leave England and live on the continent for a time.

== Background ==
He was the elder son of the famously unhappy marriage between Frederick St John, 2nd Viscount Bolingbroke and Diana Spencer, daughter of Charles Spencer, 3rd Duke of Marlborough. St John was educated at Eton College in Berkshire and Christ Church, Oxford, where he matriculated in 1777. He succeeded his father as viscount in 1787.

== Career ==
St John entered the British House of Commons for Cricklade in 1782, at the age of 21, representing the constituency as Member of Parliament (MP) until 1784.

== Family ==
On 26 February 1783, he married firstly Charlotte Collins, daughter of his former tutor Thomas Collins. He had by her two sons and a daughter. After the birth of these three children, George embarked on a sexual relationship with his younger half-sister Mary Beauclerk. Mary was a twin from their mother's second marriage to Topham Beauclerk, but born in 1766 before their marriage 1768. George and Mary's child was delivered in Paris but passed off at home as a child of George and Charlotte's for a time. Charlotte was anxious to save her marriage, and hoped by this ruse to preserve the family name from infamy and her marriage from ruin. However, Mary became pregnant for the second time by George in 1788, and delivered their second child, again in France.

In 1789 George abandoned his wife and legitimate children. He and Mary along with their two small children left Britain to live together on the Continent. They travelled under the name 'Barton' and left instructions to their families not to try to find them. The story quickly reached their circle of family and influential friends, and was reported in The Times (7 July 1789). Mary went on to bear him another two sons, all of whom lived to adulthood. By May 1794 George had abandoned Mary and the four boys for a Belgian noblewoman, Isabella Charlotte Antoinette Sophia Hompesch, Baroness von Hompesch. He persuaded her to marry him bigamously and then to live with him in obscurity first on the Continent, then in Britain, and finally in the United States. Their eldest children were all illegitimate.

Mary later (1797) married an Anglo-German Bavarian Count Franz von Jenison-Walworth, by whom she had legitimate issue and descendants. At least one of her sons by St John, Robert St John, called Bob St John, was still alive and much loved by the politician Charles James Fox and his mistress, later wife Elizabeth Armistead.

Charlotte died in 1803, and St John lawfully married Isabella Hompesch on 1 August 1804. By his second wife, he had legitimate issue, two daughters and two sons. St John died, aged 63, at Pisa in Italy on a journey to regain his daughter's health. He was succeeded in his titles by his oldest surviving son Henry St John, 4th Viscount Bolingbroke, as the oldest son George had died in 1804 just before his mother.

Parliament of Great Britain
Preceded by Paul Benfield; John Macpherson	Member of Parliament for Cricklade; 1782 – 1784; With: Paul Benfield	Succeeded by Charles Westley Coxe; Robert Adamson
Peerage of Great Britain
Preceded by Frederick St John	Viscount Bolingbroke; 1787–1824	Succeeded by Henry St John
Preceded by Frederick St John	Viscount St John; 1787–1824	Succeeded by Henry St John
