= Lord Robert Spencer =

British politician (1747–1831)

The Right Honorable Lord Robert Spencer PC
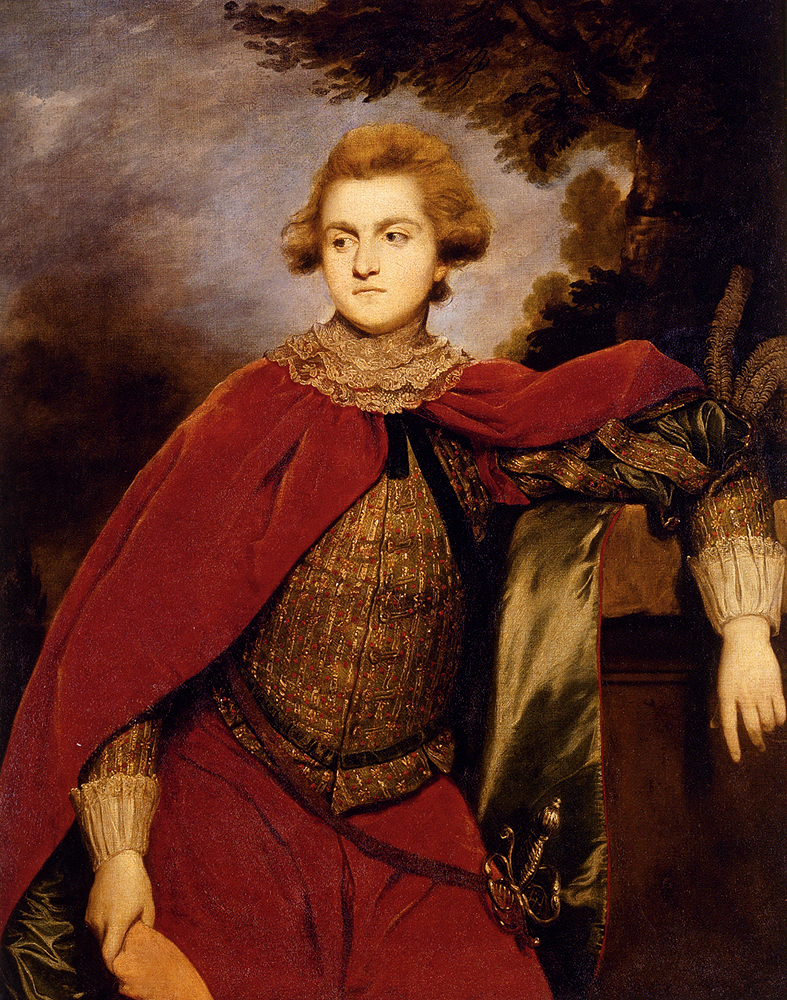
- Lord Robert Spencer by Joshua Reynolds

Member of Parliament for New Woodstock
- In office 1818–1820 Serving with Sir Henry Dashwood
- Preceded by: Sir Henry Dashwood; William Thornton
- Succeeded by: John Gladstone; James Langston

Personal details
- Born: 8 May 1747
- Died: 23 June 1831 (aged 84)
- Spouse: Harriet Bouverie (after 1811)
- Parent(s): Charles Spencer, 3rd Duke of Marlborough; Elizabeth Spencer, Duchess of Marlborough
- Education: Christ Church, Oxford

Lord Robert Spencer (8 May 1747 – 23 June 1831) was a British politician who sat in the House of Commons several times between 1768 and 1818.

== Early life ==
Spencer was born on 8 May 1747. He was the son of Charles Spencer, 3rd Duke of Marlborough, and his wife Elizabeth, daughter of Thomas Trevor, 2nd Baron Trevor.

He matriculated at Christ Church, Oxford on 10 April 1762 and was awarded MA on 6 May 1765. From 1766 to 1768 he undertook a Grand Tour through Austria, Italy and France.

== Career ==
At the 1768 general election Spencer was returned as Member of Parliament for New Woodstock on the Marlborough interest. He was appointed a Lord of Trade in April 1770 but did not attend the Board regularly nor parliament itself. He resigned his seat in January 1771 and was elected MP for Oxford in a by election on 31 January 1771. He was returned for Oxford in 1774 and 1780. He was an ardent supporter of Fox throughout his career and after. In 1784 he was returned again for Oxford.

Spencer was a member of a subscription committee set up to raise funds to support the Whigs in the forthcoming general election. He remained active in fund-raising appeals for the party for many years afterwards. In consequence the Duke of Marlborough replaced him as candidate for Oxford in 1790. Fox may have intended a seat for Winchelsea for him, but nothing transpired. He did not want to spend £3,000 to buy a seat at Wootton Bassett or risk an expensive contest at Evesham, and did not want to be a liability on his party. He maintained a vain hope that the family interest would be available at Oxford, but it was not. In the 1790 general election he was elected MP for Wareham probably at the party's expense. In the 1796 general election the Whigs appear to have paid £3,000 his return again at Wareham. However, he was in financial difficulties in 1799 and lost through gambling again so heavily that he had to sell his London house and pictures. He resigned his seat in February 1799.

In March 1802 a vacancy arose for Spencer at Tavistock and he was elected at a by-election on 25 March 1802. In August 1802 he went to Paris with Fox, and met Napoleon with whom he discussed his great ancestor. Later when Napoleon was at St Helena Spencer sent him a biography of Marlborough. He was returned for Tavistock in the 1802 and 1806 general elections. He was Surveyor General of Woods, Forests, Parks, and Chases from February 1806 to March 1807. When Fox died his political raison d’être was gone and he gave up his seat at 1807. He never ceased to lament and praise Fox.

He resumed his seat for Tavistock in 1817 as a stopgap for the Duke of Bedford when Lord John Russell vacated the seat through illness and was returned in a by-election on 12 March 1817. Similarly he stood in for his own family at Woodstock in the 1818 general election although his nephew the Duke of Marlborough withdrew him from Woodstock in 1820.

== Personal life ==
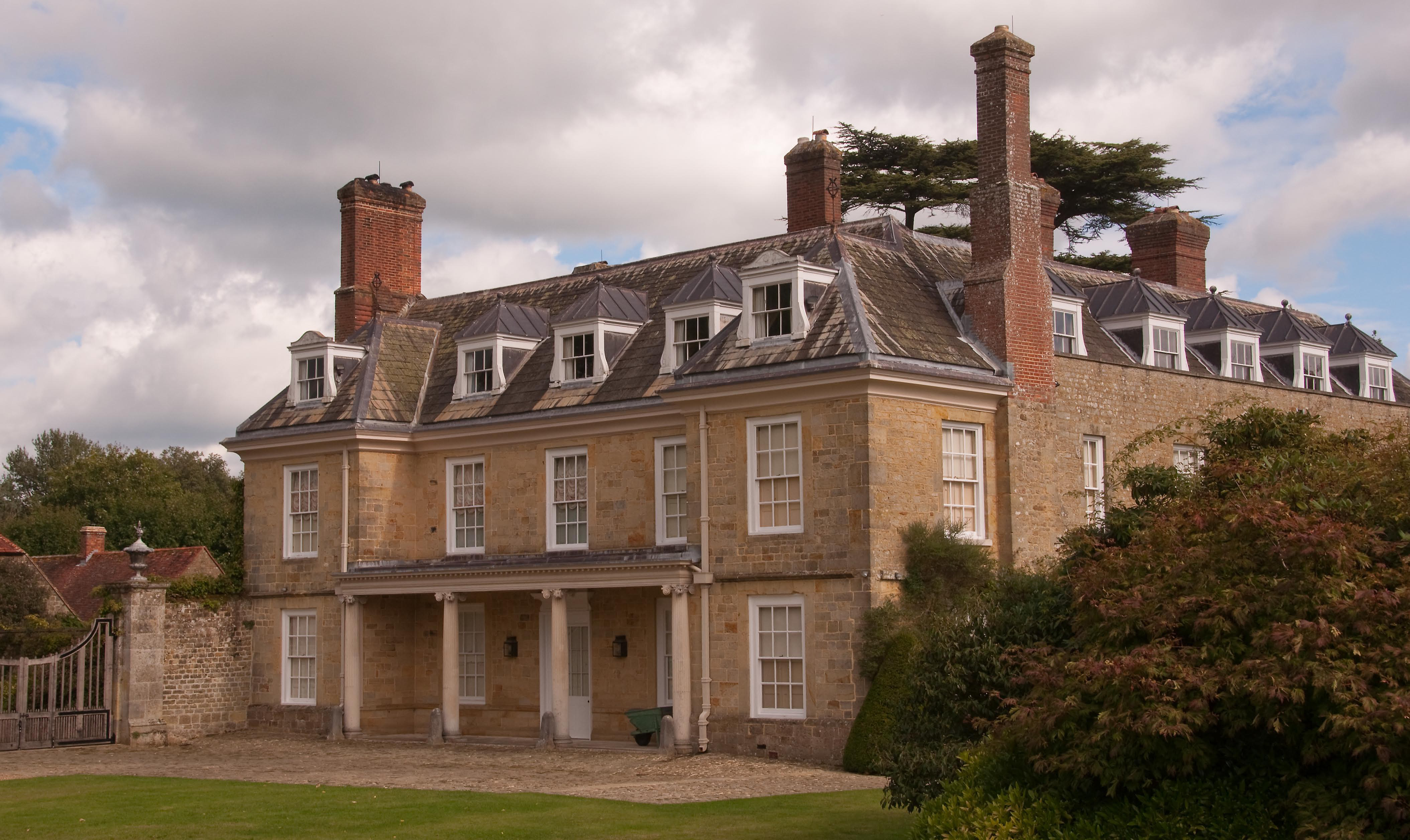
Woolbeding House

Spencer was an inveterate gambler and having lost his official salary found himself in financial difficulties around 1781, until he was admitted to a twelfth share in Fox's faro bank at Brooks's, with a fee of five or six guineas an hour. The circle surrounding Fox included Edward Bouverie, a fellow habitué of Brook's, and his younger wife Harriet, the daughter of Sir Everard Fawkener, K.B. She was a society hostess and actively campaigned for the Whigs. She became Spencer's mistress and the youngest Bouverie child, Diana, born in 1786 was acknowledged as a Bouverie but was referred to as “the tell-tale Bouverie, for there never was such a perfect indisputable Spencer, Lord Robert's walking picture and the very prettiest creature that ever was seen”. By 1791 his profits from the faro bank were sufficient to allow him to purchase Woolbeding House in Sussex.

In the 1760s and 1770s he was the lover of the famous courtesan Kitty Kennedy.

Spencer married his mistress Harriet Bouverie on 2 October 1811, a year after the death of her husband.

Spencer retired to Woolbeding which he had tastefully embellished. He died on 23 June 1831, “a venerable grave old man”. He left Woolbeding to his natural daughter Diana Bouverie whose mother had predeceased him. She married George Ponsonby.

== Sources ==
- "Mrs Bouverie and Mrs Crewe: two Whig hostesses from the 18th Century". All Things Georgian. 25 January 2015.

Parliament of Great Britain
| Preceded by The Viscount Bateman; Hon. William Gordon | Member of Parliament for New Woodstock; 1768–1771; With: Hon. William Gordon | Succeeded by John Skynner; Hon. William Gordon |
| Preceded by George Nares; Lieutenant-Colonel the Hon. William Harcourt | Member of Parliament for Oxford; 1771–1790; With: Lieutenant-Colonel the Hon. William Harcourt 1771-1774; Captain the Hon. Peregrine Bertie 1774-1790 | Succeeded by Francis Burton; Captain the Hon. Peregrine Bertie |
| Preceded by John Calcraft; Thomas Farrer | Member of Parliament for Wareham; 1790–1799; With: General Richard Smith 1790-1796; Charles Ellis 1796; Sir Godfrey Vassall 1796-1799 | Succeeded by Sir Godfrey Vassall; Joseph Hankey |
| Preceded by Lord John Russell; Hon. Richard FitzPatrick | Member of Parliament for Tavistock; 1802–1807; With: Hon. Richard FitzPatrick | Succeeded by Lord William Russell; Hon. Richard FitzPatrick |
| Preceded by Lord William Russell; Lord John Russell | Member of Parliament for Tavistock; 1817–1818; With: Lord William Russell | Succeeded by Lord William Russell; Lord John Russell |
| Preceded by Sir Henry Dashwood; William Thornton | Member of Parliament for New Woodstock; 1818–1820; With: Sir Henry Dashwood | Succeeded by John Gladstone; James Langston |
Honorary titles
| Preceded by The Lord Carteret | Senior Privy Counsellor; 1826–1831 | Succeeded by The Earl of Derby |
