= Elizabeth Spencer, Duchess of Marlborough =

British noble (1713-1761)

Her Grace The Duchess of Marlborough
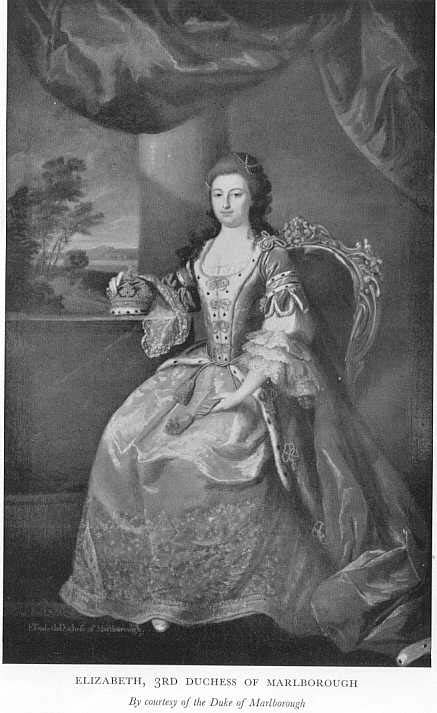
- Born: c. 1713
- Died: 7 October 1761 (aged 47–48)
- Spouse: Charles Spencer, 3rd Duke of Marlborough (after 1732)
- Issue: Lady Diana Beauclerk; Elizabeth Herbert, Countess of Pembroke and Montgomery; George Spencer, 4th Duke of Marlborough; Lord Charles Spencer; Lord Robert Spencer
- Father: Thomas Trevor, 2nd Baron Trevor

Elizabeth Spencer, Duchess of Marlborough (née Trevor; c. 1713 – 7 October 1761) was the wife of Charles Spencer, 3rd Duke of Marlborough.

== Early life ==
She was the daughter of Thomas Trevor, 2nd Baron Trevor of Bromham, Bedfordshire. Her paternal grandparents were the former Elizabeth Searle and Thomas Trevor, 1st Baron Trevor, a Chief Justice of the Common Pleas and Lord President of the Council.

== Personal life ==
She married Charles Spencer, then Earl of Sunderland on 23 May 1732, becoming Countess of Sunderland. The Earl's grandmother, Sarah, Dowager Duchess of Marlborough, disapproved of the marriage because Elizabeth's grandfather, the 1st Baron Trevor, had been a political opponent. The dowager commented that "she has very bad teeth, which I think is an objection alone in a wife, and they will be sure to grow worse with time." Elizabeth became a duchess in the following year when her husband inherited the dukedom. Together, they had five children:

- Lady Diana Spencer (1734–1808), who married Frederick St John, 2nd Viscount Bolingbroke. After his death, she married Topham Beauclerk, and had children from both marriages.
- Elizabeth Herbert, Countess of Pembroke and Montgomery (1737–1831), who married Henry Herbert, 10th Earl of Pembroke, and had children.
- George Spencer, 4th Duke of Marlborough (1739–1817).
- Lord Charles Spencer (1740–1820), who married Hon. Mary Beauclerk, and had children.
- Lord Robert Spencer (1747–1831), who married Henrietta Bouverie.

She also acted as godmother to George John Spencer, 2nd Earl Spencer in 1758.

The couple lived at a lodge in the "Little Park" at Windsor, by the permission of Sarah Churchill, but the dowager was unhappy with the alterations made by the new duke, and forced them to move out in 1737, replacing them with Charles's younger brother John and his new wife.

=== Legacy ===
Her portrait, by Jean-Baptiste Van Loo, hangs in Blenheim Palace.
