= List of Bavarian diplomats to Austria =

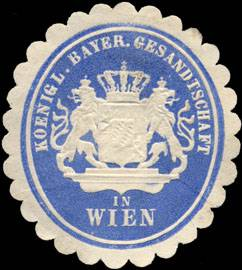
Seal of the legation

This is an incomplete list of Bavarian Envoys and Ministers to Austria from 1693 to 1920.

== History ==
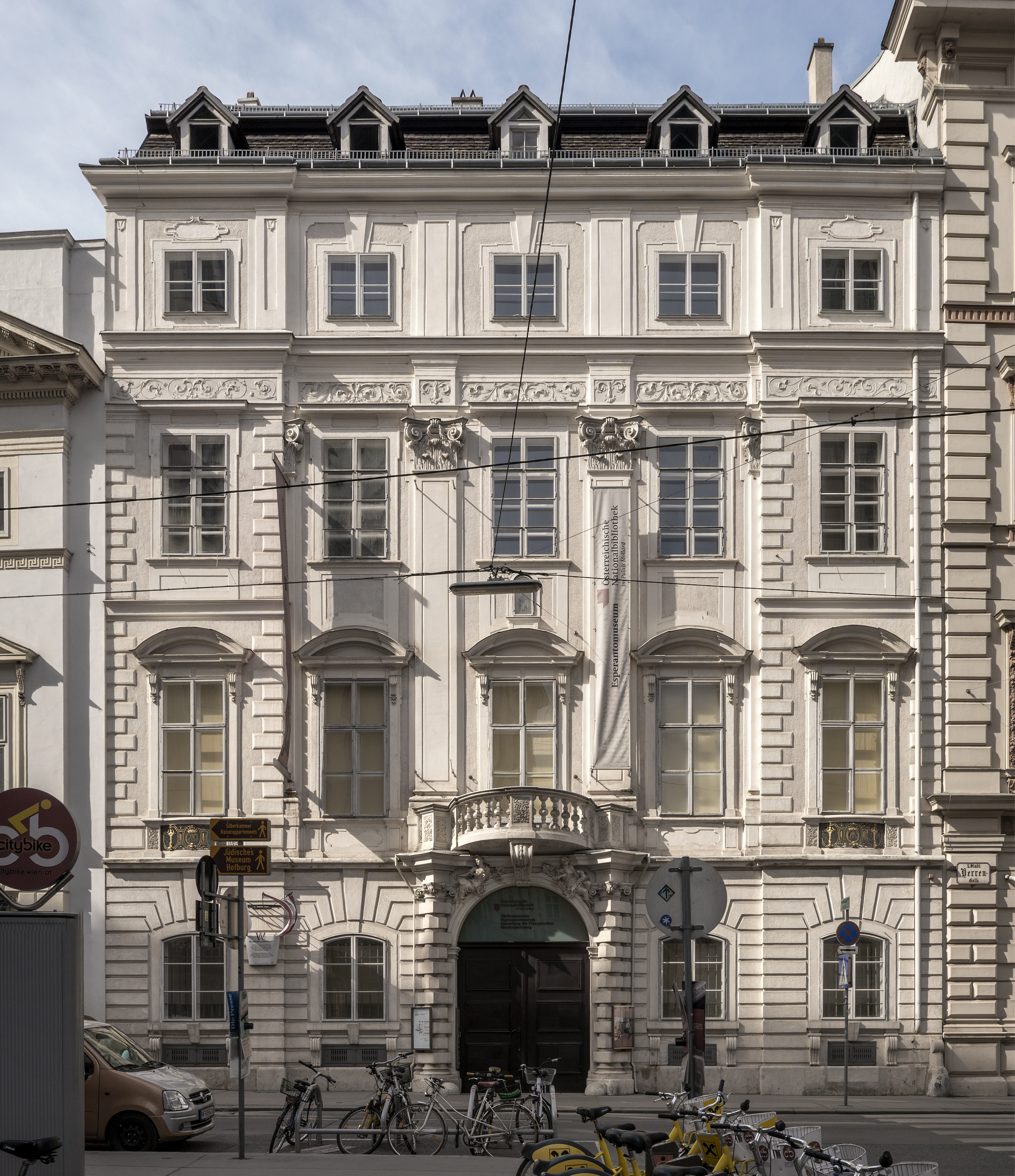
The Palais Mollard-Clary, Vienna

Diplomatic relations between the Electorate of Bavaria and Austria were established in 1693. In 1805, after the Peace of Pressburg, the then-elector, Maximilian Joseph, raised himself as King of Bavaria, and the Holy Roman Empire was abolished the year after. The Kingdom of Bavaria succeeded the former Electorate in 1805 and continued to exist until 1918. With the unification of Germany into the German Empire in 1871, the kingdom became a federated state of the new empire and was second in size, power, and wealth only to the leading state, the Kingdom of Prussia. In 1918, Bavaria became a republic after the German Revolution, and the kingdom was thus succeeded by the current Free State of Bavaria, and the legation was terminated.

The final Bavarian Embassy was located at the Palais Mollard-Clary, a Baroque palace in Vienna in the first district Innere Stadt, at Herrengasse 9.

== Mission chiefs ==
=== Envoys from the Electorate of Bavaria ===
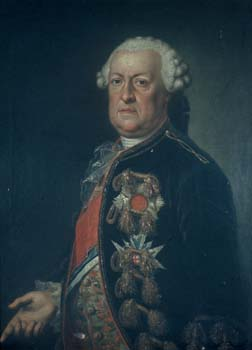
Joseph Franz Maria von Seinsheim, by Georg Desmarées

- (1693–1736): Franz Hannibal von Mörmann
- (1736–1742): Johann Franz von Haslang
- (1742–1748): Joseph Franz Maria von Seinsheim
- ...
- (–1792): Heinrich Theodor von Hallberg
- ...
- (1797–1800): Anton Anselm Capellini von Wickenburg
- (1800–): Karl Ernst von Gravenreuth

=== Envoys of the Kingdom of Bavaria ===
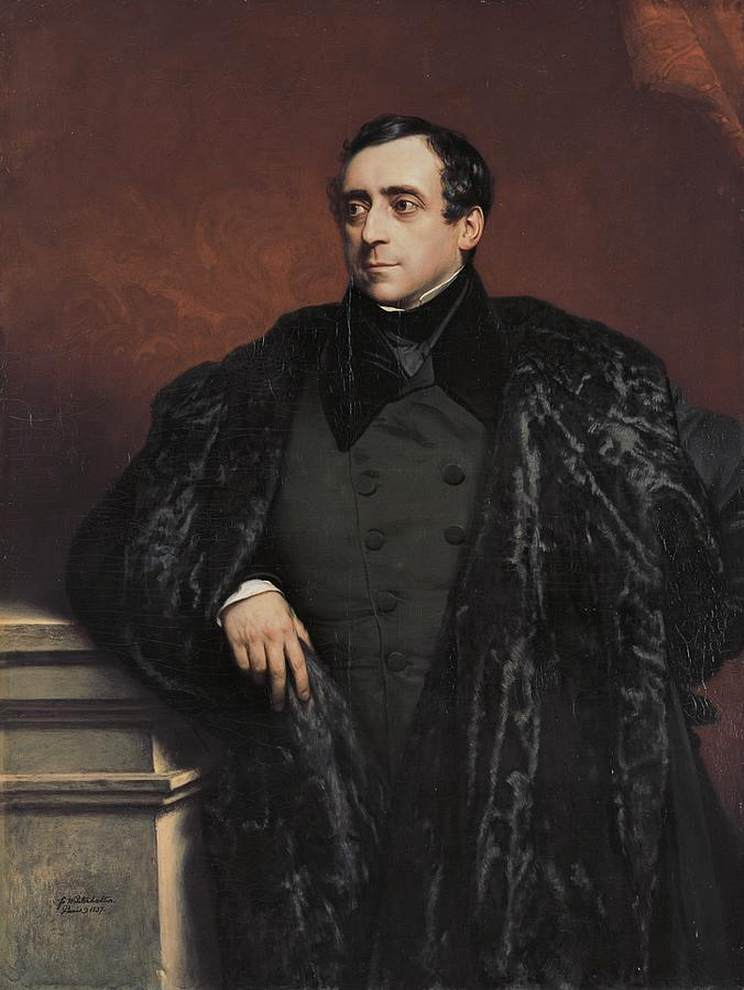
Count Franz Oliver von Jenison-Walworth, by Franz Xaver Winterhalter, 1837

- (1806–1815): Aloys von Rechberg
- (1817–1826): Eduard von Stainlein
- (1826–1827): vacant
- (1827–1832): Franz Gabriel von Bray-Steinburg
- (1833–1835): August Baron de Cetto
- (1835–1842): Maximilian Emanuel von Lerchenfeld
- (1843–1847): Franz Oliver von Jenison-Walworth
- (1847–1849): Friedrich von Luxburg
- (1849–1859): Maximilian von und zu Lerchenfeld auf Köfering
- (1860–1870): Otto von Bray-Steinburg
- (1870–1871): Karl von Schrenck von Notzing
- (1871–1896): Otto von Bray-Steinburg
- (1896–1902): Clemens von Podewils-Dürniz
- (1903–1919): Heinrich Tucher von Simmelsdorf
- (1919–1920): Philipp von Hoffmann (liquidating chargé d'affaires)

== See also ==
- Austria–Germany relations
