= Robert Adamson (MP) =

Robert Adamson (1753 - 17 September 1817) was the member of Parliament for Cricklade in England from 13 April 1784 to 4 April 1785.
