= Frederick St John, 2nd Viscount Bolingbroke =

British peer and landowner

The Right Honourable The Viscount Bolingbroke
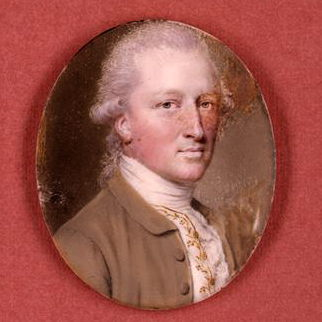
- Portrait of Bolingbroke
- Born: 21 December 1732
- Died: 5 May 1787 (aged 54)
- Education: Eton College
- Spouse: Lady Diana Spencer (m. 1757; div. 1768)
- Children: 4
- Parents: John St John, 2nd Viscount St John (father); Anne Furnese (mother)
- Relatives: Henry St John, 1st Viscount Bolingbroke (uncle); General the Hon. Henry St John (brother); Lord Marlborough (father-in-law); George St. John (son); General the Hon. Frederick St. John (son)

Arms of St John: Argent, on a chief gules two mullets or

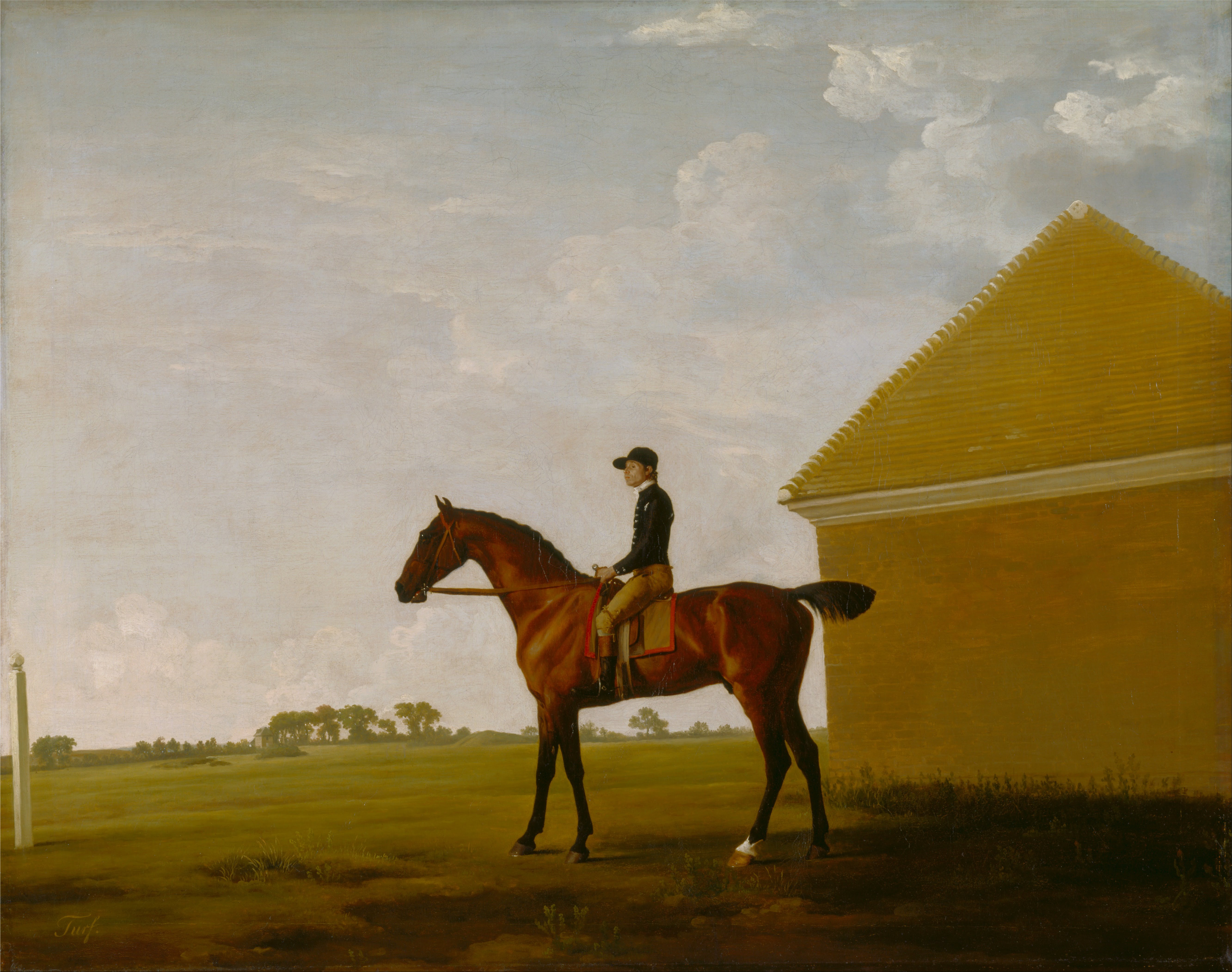
"Turf, with Jockey up, at Newmarket", painting c.1766 by George Stubbs of one of Bolingbroke's famous racehorses. Yale Center for British Art, Paul Mellon Collection

Frederick St John, 2nd Viscount Bolingbroke (21 December 1732 – 5 May 1787) was a British peer and landowner. His father was John St John, 2nd Viscount St John, half-brother of Henry St John, 1st Viscount Bolingbroke (1678–1751). His mother was Anne Furnese and his younger brother General the Hon. Henry St John (1738–1818).

== Biography ==
Bolingbroke was educated at Eton College, Berkshire. He succeeded to the title of 3rd Baron St John of Battersea on 19 June 1748. He succeeded to the title of 3rd Viscount St John on 26 November 1748.

"Bully," as he was called by his contemporaries, is best known for his extravagant lifestyle and the racehorses he bred. On 8 September 1757 he married Lady Diana Spencer, elder daughter of Charles Spencer, 3rd Duke of Marlborough, after making a joking proposal to her in one of London's pleasure gardens. Bolingbroke's insistence on maintaining a bachelor's lifestyle (which included lavish spending, a string of mistresses, heavy drinking and gambling) after their marriage, coupled with verbal and, possibly, physical spousal abuse, led to a bitter separation between Bully and the popular and artistic Lady Diana. Bolingbroke brought divorce proceedings against his wife for her criminal conversation with Topham Beauclerk, with whom she bore a child.

Things worsened for Viscount Bolingbroke after his divorce. The damages he won from Beauclerk were paltry compared to the mountain of debt he acquired. Rather than economize he chose to sell his prized racehorse. Even before his divorce his tight finances led to his sponsoring changes in law that allowed inheritors to sell off family properties. Once the law was passed he set about selling property that had been in his family for centuries.

In 1763, he sold the estate of Battersea, Surrey to Viscount Spencer. Eventually, he begged for and received a post as Lord of the Bedchamber in the court of King George III—a post he'd previously held while still married to Lady Diana, but given up due to a combination of disinterest and indolence. In the meantime he never stopped searching for an heiress old enough or unattractive enough (and therefore desperate to marry) to wed a man of questionable finances and reputation.

Viscount Bolingbroke found himself overshadowed by his wife even after their marriage ended. Bolingbroke was not especially popular outside of a certain set while Lady Diana's circle included the eccentric and intelligent Dr Samuel Johnson and the fashionable political hostess, Georgiana Cavendish, Duchess of Devonshire.

Viscount Bolingbroke's mistress was the fashionable courtesan Polly Jones.

== Death ==
He died on 5 May 1787, aged 54.

== Children ==
- Sir George Richard St. John, 3rd Viscount Bolingbroke (5 March 1761 – 11 December 1824)
- Lady Henriette St. John (1 August 1762 – April 1834) – married Henry Towcester in 1792
- General Hon. Frederick St. John (20 December 1765 – 19 November 1844)

== Quotes ==
Lord Chesterfield said:

"(he was) ... by his talents no way unworthy to bear his uncle's name, (and had) "true and solid good sense, real taste and knowing a great deal."

Cokayne and Gibbs said,

"for the last six years of his life he was out of his mind."

== Titles ==
- 1748 Baron St. John of Battersea
- 1748 Viscount St. John of Battersea
- 1751 Baronet St. John, of Lidiard Tregoze

Peerage of Great Britain
Preceded by Henry St John	Viscount Bolingbroke; 1751–1787	Succeeded by George St John
Preceded by John St John	Viscount St John; 1749–1787	Succeeded by George St John
