= Low Walworth =

Coordinates: 54.566°N 1.644°W

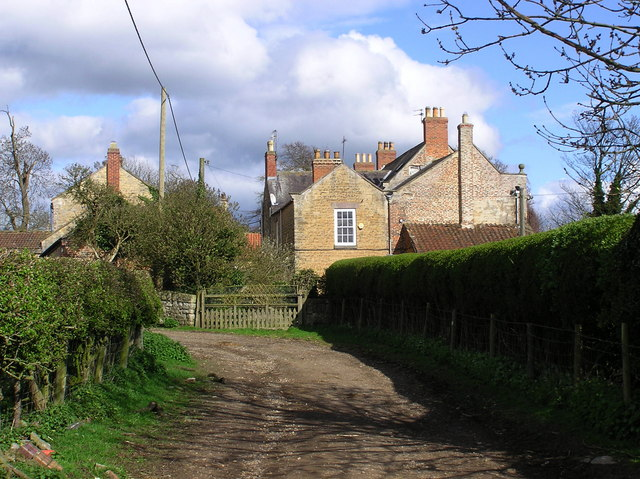
- Low Walworth Hall viewed from the west

- Location within County Durham
- OS grid reference: NZ238176
- Unitary authority: Darlington
- Ceremonial county: County Durham
- Region: North East
- Country: England
- Sovereign state: United Kingdom
- Post town: DARLINGTON
- Postcode district: DL2
- Dialling code: 01325
- Police: Durham
- Fire: County Durham and Darlington
- Ambulance: North East
- UK Parliament: Sedgefield

Low Walworth is a hamlet in County Durham, England, 1.5 miles (2.4 km) to the north−west of the edge of Darlington. It consists of Low Walworth Hall, Low Walworth Farm and their respective cottages, flats and outbuildings. Several of these buildings are listed, and date from the 17th to the 19th century. Attached to one of the late-18th-century farm buildings is a gin gang, or building from which a horse powered a threshing machine by walking in a circle. The hall has accommodated at least one High Sheriff of Durham.

== Low Walworth Hall ==
The earliest documents recognised by English Heritage in relation to this hall are 1681 Court of Chancery papers, written when the Jenison family owned it. However it has been suggested that part of it dates from around 1500 and that in the early 16th century it was the dower house to Walworth Castle. Low Walworth was sold by Francis Jenison when he moved to the continent in 1775 and was later made a Count of the Holy Roman Empire. It is a sizeable 17th- or early-18th-century house with 19th-century additions to the left and rear. It is built of partially rendered coursed rubble and ashlar, brickwork chimneys and a Welsh slate roof. The left−hand or western addition to the south−facing main block, with the ball finial on the parapet (see image), is 18th-century or earlier and possibly a former barn.

The set of early-19th-century outbuildings to the north of the Hall was once a house with stabling and is now a garage and storage building. It has pantiled roofs with stone−flagged eaves, squared limestone walls and brickwork chimneys, and it is listed. The early-19th-century garden walls to the left or west of the Hall are also listed. They are built of hand−made red brick with flat stone coping. They are high walls enclosing three sides of a rose garden with a lower and possibly rebuilt wall on the south side. The eastern wall has a coursed rubble face with an arched doorway in the south−east corner, and the north wall has boarded doors.

(Arthur) Neville Eade lived at Low Walworth from 1937 to 1959. He and his cousin, Charles Eade, had bought the Walworth Castle estate at auction in 1931, after the death of the previous owner, their cousin Gerald Percy Vivian Aylmer. However Walworth Castle held prisoners of war in World War II, and was sold to Durham County Council in 1950. In 1968–1969 the resident of the hall was Peter Guy Edwards, High Sheriff of Durham. On 29 June 2008 the gardens, including the old walled garden, were opened to the public for a day. The gardens included an African theme planting and a wildlife lake area.

== Low Walworth farm ==
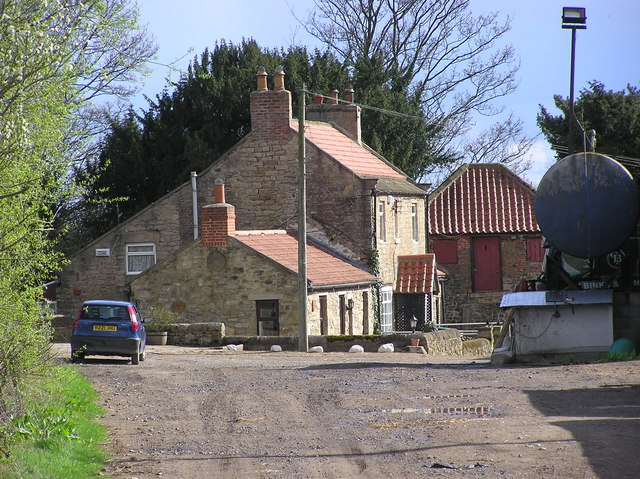
Low Walworth Farm

The late-18th-century farm buildings to the north of the farmhouse are listed. They are made of squared and coursed rubble limestone, and the square−plan building in front of the two−storeyed threshing barn is a gin gang, otherwise known as a wheelhouse or horse engine house from which a horse once powered a threshing machine. The buildings have pantiled roofs with stone−flagged eaves, and the front range has partially−blocked archways.
