= Lord Charles Spencer =

British politician

The Right Honourable Lord Charles Spencer PC
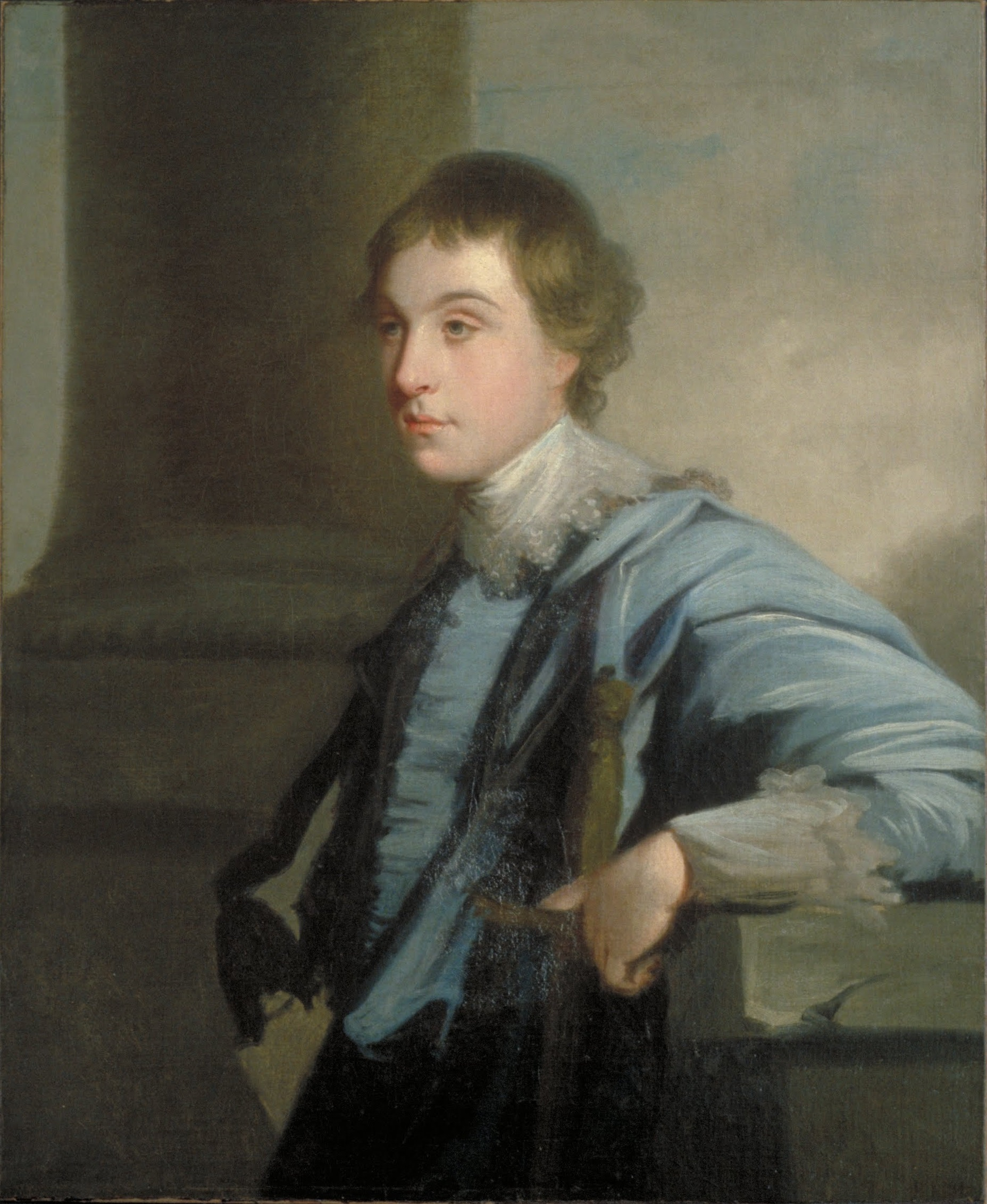
- Portrait of Lord Charles Spencer, by Joshua Reynolds

Joint Postmaster General
- In office 1801–1806 Serving with: The Lord Auckland (1801–1804); The Duke of Montrose (1804–1806)
- Monarch: George III
- Prime Minister: Henry Addington; William Pitt the Younger
- Preceded by: The Lord Auckland; Earl Gower
- Succeeded by: The Earl of Carysfort; The Earl of Buckinghamshire

Master of the Mint
- In office 1806–1806
- Monarch: George III
- Prime Minister: William Pitt the Younger
- Preceded by: The Earl Bathurst
- Succeeded by: Charles Bathurst

Personal details
- Born: 31 March 1740
- Died: 16 June 1820 (aged 80)
- Spouse: Mary Beauclerk (m. 1762; died 1812)
- Children: Robert Spencer; John Spencer; William Robert Spencer
- Parent(s): Charles Spencer, 3rd Duke of Marlborough; Hon. Elizabeth Trevor

Lord Charles Spencer PC (31 March 1740 – 16 June 1820) was a British courtier and politician from the Spencer family who sat in the House of Commons between 1761 and 1801.

== Early life ==
Spencer was born on 31 March 1740. He was the second son of Charles Spencer, 3rd Duke of Marlborough, and the Hon. Elizabeth Trevor, daughter of Thomas Trevor, 2nd Baron Trevor. George Spencer, 4th Duke of Marlborough, was his elder brother.

== Career ==
Spencer sat as Member of Parliament for Oxfordshire from 1761 to 1790 and 1796 to 1801 and was sworn of the Privy Council in 1763.

He served as Comptroller of the Household from 1763 to 1765, as a Junior Lord of the Admiralty from 1768 to 1779 and as Treasurer of the Chamber from 1779 to 1782, when that sinecure post was abolished. He was later Postmaster General from 1801 to 1806 and Master of the Mint in 1806. From 1806 until his death, he was a Gentleman of the Bedchamber to George III.

He was Colonel of the Oxfordshire Militia and commanded the regiment when it was deployed to Ireland during the Irish Rebellion of 1798.

== Personal life ==
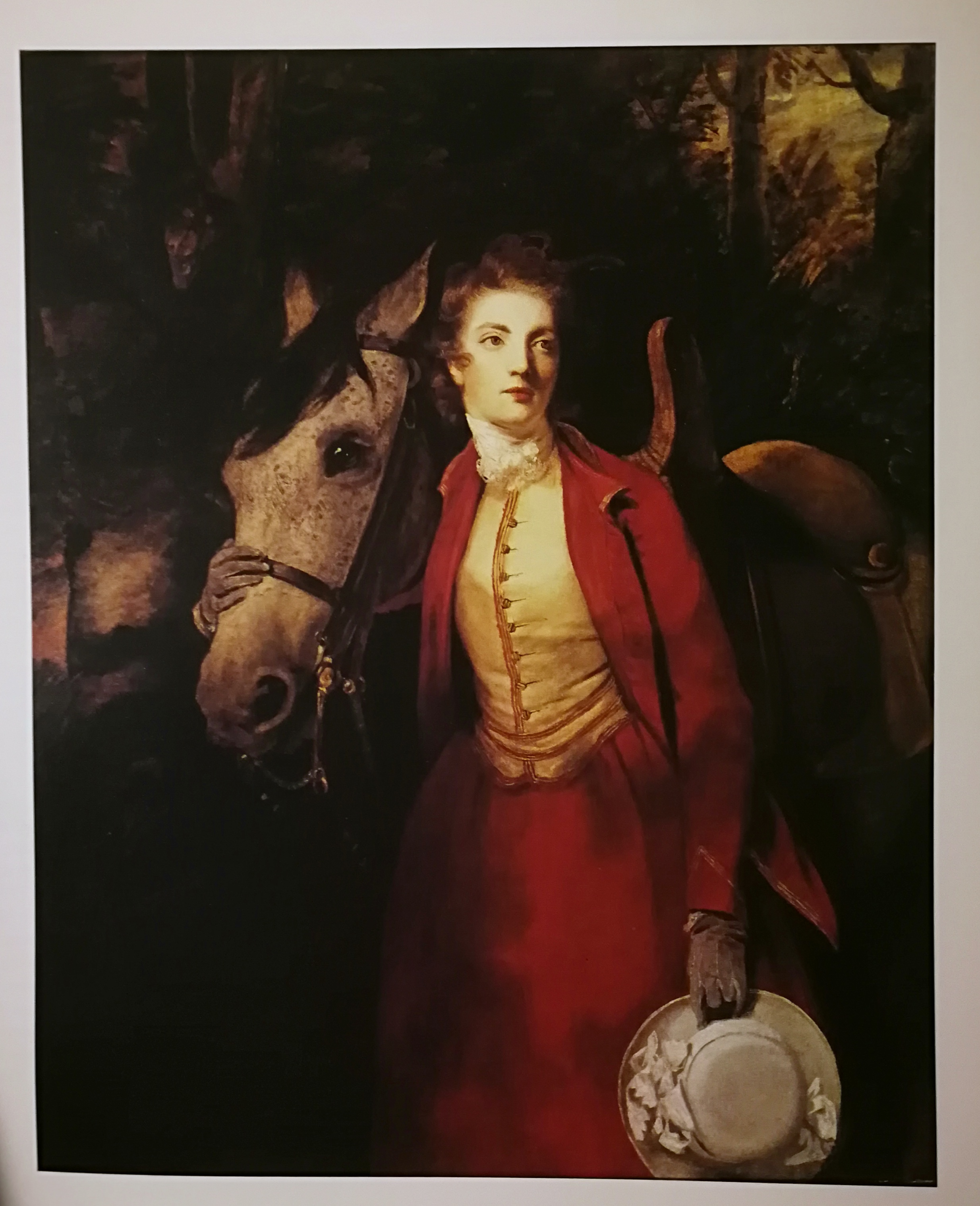
Portrait of Lady Charles Spencer by Sir Joshua Reynolds

On 2 October 1762, Spencer was married to Lady Mary Beauclerk (1743–1812), a daughter of Vere Beauclerk, 1st Baron Vere and the sister of Aubrey Beauclerk, 5th Duke of St Albans. Together, they had three sons:

- Robert Spencer (1764–1831), who married Henrietta (née Fawkener) Bouverie, a daughter of Sir Everard Fawkener, and widow of Hon. Edward Bouverie, in 1811.
- John Spencer (1767–1831), MP for Wilton who married his cousin, Lady Elizabeth Spencer, a daughter of the 4th Duke of Marlborough.
- William Robert Spencer (1769–1834), who married Countess Susan von Jenison-Walworth.

Lady Charles died in January 1812 aged 68. Charles survived her by eight years and died in June 1820, aged 80.

Parliament of Great Britain
Preceded by Viscount Parker; Sir Edward Turner, Bt	Member of Parliament for Oxfordshire; 1761–1790; With: Sir James Dashwood, Bt 1761–1768; The Viscount Wenman 1768–1790	Succeeded by The Marquess of Blandford; The Viscount Wenman
Preceded by The Marquess of Blandford; The Viscount Wenman	Member of Parliament for Oxfordshire; 1796–1801; With: John Fane	Succeeded by Parliament of the United Kingdom
Parliament of the United Kingdom
Preceded by Parliament of Great Britain	Member of Parliament for Oxfordshire; 1801; With: John Fane	Succeeded by Lord Francis Spencer; John Fane
Political offices
Preceded by George Onslow	Out-Ranger of Windsor Forest; 1763	Succeeded by Benjamin Bathurst
Preceded by George Onslow	Surveyor of Gardens and Waters; 1763	Succeeded by John Marshe Dickinson
Preceded by Humphry Morice	Comptroller of the Household; 1763–1765	Succeeded by Thomas Pelham
Preceded by George Rice	Treasurer of the Chamber; 1779–1782	Office abolished
Preceded by The Lord Auckland; Earl Gower	Postmaster General; 1801–1806; With: The Lord Auckland 1801–1804; The Duke of Montrose 1804–1806	Succeeded by The Earl of Carysfort; The Earl of Buckinghamshire
Preceded by The Earl Bathurst	Master of the Mint; 1806	Succeeded by Charles Bathurst
Honorary titles
Preceded by The Duke of Marlborough	Senior Privy Counsellor; 1817–1820	Succeeded by The Lord Carteret
