= Topham Beauclerk =

British wit (1739–1780)

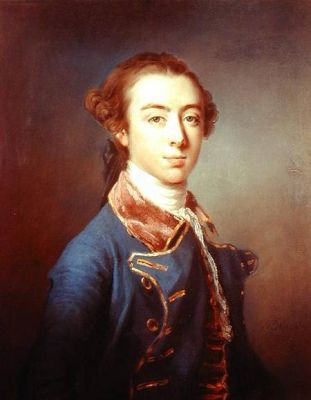
- Portrait of Beauclerk, by Francis Cotes (1756)
- Born: 22 December 1739; Pall Mall, London, England
- Died: 11 March 1780 (aged 40); Great Russell Street, London, England
- Education: Trinity College, Oxford
- Spouse: Diana St John, Viscountess Bolingbroke (m. 1768)
- Children: 4, including Elizabeth Herbert, Countess of Pembroke; Charles George Beauclerk
- Parents: Lord Sidney Beauclerk (father); Mary Beauclerk (mother)
- Relatives: Robert Herbert, 12th Earl of Pembroke (grandson); Aubrey Beauclerk (grandson)

Topham Beauclerk (/boʊˈklɛər/ boh-KLAIR; 22 December 1739 – 11 March 1780) was a celebrated English wit and a friend of Samuel Johnson and Horace Walpole.

== Early life ==
Topham Beauclerk was born on 22 December 1739 in Pall Mall, London. He was the only son of Lord Sidney Beauclerk and a great-grandson of King Charles II. He was christened on 19 January 1740 in St James's Church, Piccadilly, in Westminster. In 1744, his father died and the four-year-old Topham, and his widowed mother, Mary Beauclerk, moved to Upper Brook Street in London and lived there until 1753.

Between 1753 and 1757, Topham Beauclerk probably attended Eton College (this is not completely certain as only his surname, Beauclerk, is noted in the college's register). It seems he did not live in the school as a boarder, but in the family home in nearby Windsor. In November 1757 he matriculated at Trinity College, Oxford, which had been attended by his father. His date of leaving is unknown, but he was still there in 1759, when he first met Samuel Johnson. Like most of his social class, he did not graduate. In 1763 he was in Italy with John Fitzpatrick.

== Friendships and anecdotes ==
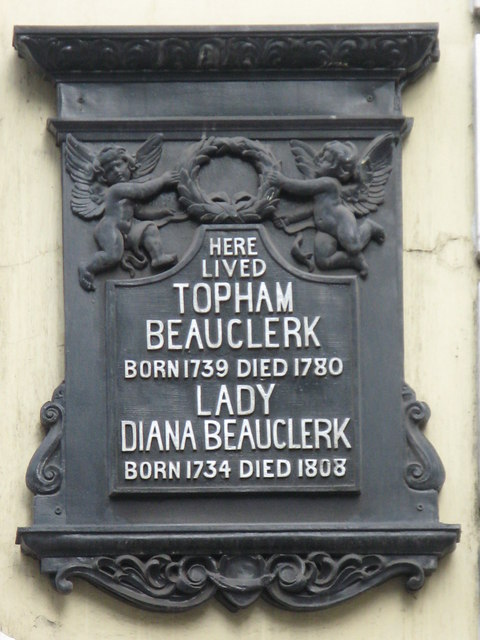
A plaque at Great Russell Street, London, commemorating Topham Beauclerk and Lady Diana Beauclerk, erected in 1905 by the Duke of Bedford

Beauclerk entertained Dr Johnson at his home in Old Windsor for a number of weeks. He appears several times in James Boswell's Life of Samuel Johnson. As Bennet Langton records: "His affection for Topham Beauclerk was so great, that when Beauclerk was labouring under that severe illness which at last occasioned his death, Johnson said (with a voice faultering [sic] with emotion), 'Sir, I would walk to the extent of the diameter of the earth to save Beauclerk'." (Boswell 1672). The artist Joseph Farington records Horace Walpole as making the following remarks regarding Beauclerk:

Lord Orford mentioned many particulars relative to the late Mr. Topham Beauclerc. He said He was the worst tempered man He ever knew. Lady Di passed a most miserable life with him. Lord O, out of regard to her invited them occasionally to pass a few days at Strawberry Hill. They slept in separate beds. Beauclerc was remarkably filthy in his person which generated vermin. He took Laudanum regularly in vast quantities. He seldom rose before one or two o'clock. His principal delight was in disputing on subjects that occurred, this He did accutely. Before He died He asked pardon of Lady Di, for his ill usage of her. He had one son and two daughters by Lady Di. One married Lord Herbert, the second went abroad with her Brother, Lord Bolingbroke [i.e. George St John, 3rd Viscount Bolingbroke].

== Personal life ==
On 12 March 1768, Beauclerk was married to the Viscountess Bolingbroke, Diana St John (1734–1808), former Lady of the Bedchamber to Queen Charlotte. A member of the Spencer family, she was the eldest daughter of Charles Spencer, 3rd Duke of Marlborough and the Hon. Elizabeth Trevor. Before their marriage, Diana had been married to Frederick St John, 2nd Viscount Bolingbroke in 1757. This marriage, which gave her two sons, including George St John, 3rd Viscount Bolingbroke, was unhappy and her husband was notoriously unfaithful. In February 1768, he petitioned for divorce on grounds of adultery ("criminal conversation"). The petition required an act of parliament, which was passed the next month. Soon thereafter she married Beauclerk. They had four children together:

- Anne Beauclerk (born c. 1764), who died young.
- Elizabeth Beauclerk (1766–1793), a twin who married her first cousin, George Herbert, 11th Earl of Pembroke.
- Anne Mary Beauclerk (1766–1851), a twin who notoriously had a long-term relationship with her elder half-brother George St John. After he abandoned her to marry a Belgian baroness, she married Bavarian Count Franz von Jenison-Walworth, son of Count Francis Jenison, in 1797.
- Charles George Beauclerk (1774–1846), briefly an MP; he married Emily Charlotte "Mimie" Ogilvie (1778–1832), daughter of William Ogilvie and the former Lady Emily Lennox, in 1799.

From 1772 to 1776 he lived at 3 Adelphi Terrace. In 1774 he lived in Muswell Hill, north London. Beauclerk died at his house in Great Russell Street, Bloomsbury on 11 March 1780. Lady Diana later sold the house to retire in reduced circumstances to Richmond. The house at Great Russell Street, which was partly demolished in 1788, housed a library designed by Robert Adam. At the time of his death, Beauclerk had amassed a collection of around 30,000 books, although these were kept at his house in Muswell Hill. The books were sold by auction in 1781.

=== Descendants ===
Through his daughter Elizabeth, he was grandfather of four, including Lady Diana Herbert (who married Welbore Agar, 2nd Earl of Normanton), and Robert Herbert, 12th Earl of Pembroke.

Through his daughter Mary's relationship with the 3rd Viscount Bolingbroke, he was a grandfather to four illegitimate boys. From her marriage to Count von Walworth, he was a grandfather to two boys, only one who survived to adulthood, and four girls, the youngest of whom was Countess Emilie (or Amelia) von Walworth, from whom descended the princes of Löwenstein-Wertheim, and through them, other German royalty.

Through his son Charles, he was a grandfather to Aubrey Beauclerk (1801–1854), MP for East Surrey.

== Bibliography ==
- Adamson, Donald and Beauclerk Dewar, Peter, The House of Nell Gwyn. The Fortunes of the Beauclerk Family, 1670-1974, London: William Kimber, 1974, pp. 67–77.
- Boswell, James. Life of Johnson, ed. R. W. Chapman, intro. Pat Rogers. Oxford: Oxford Univ. Press, 1998.
- Farington, Joseph. The Farington Diary by Joseph Farington, R.A., edited by James Grieg.
- Noy, David (2016). Dr. Johnson's friend and Robert Adam's client Topham Beauclerk. Newcastle upon Tyne, UK. ISBN 978-1-4438-9325-1. OCLC 949668955.
