= Lady Diana Beauclerk =

English noblewoman and artist (1734-1808)

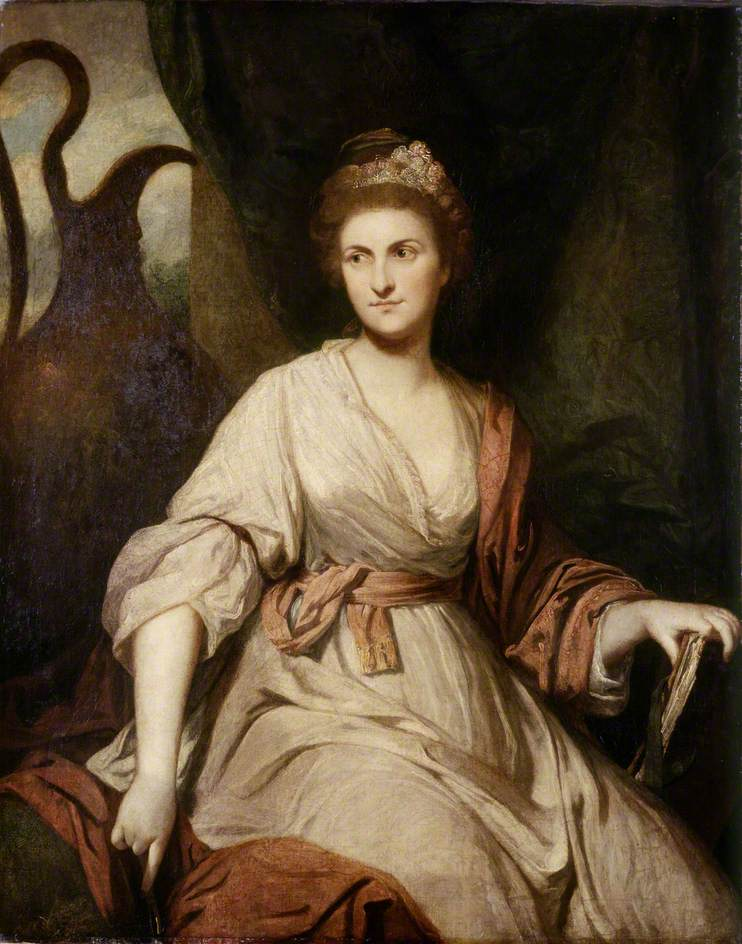
- Portrait of Lady Diana Beauclerk by Joshua Reynolds, 1763–1765
- Born: 24 March 1734
- Died: 1 August 1808 (aged 74)
- Resting place: Richmond, Surrey, England
- Occupations: noblewoman & artist
- Spouse(s): Frederick St John, 2nd Viscount Bolingbroke (m. 1757; div. 1768) Topham Beauclerk (m. 1768; died 1780)
- Children: 7
- Parents: Charles Spencer, 3rd Duke of Marlborough (father); the Hon. Elizabeth Trevor (mother)
- Relatives: George Spencer (brother); Elizabeth Spencer (sister); Sarah Churchill, Duchess of Marlborough (great-grandmother); George St John (son); Frederick St John (son); Charles George Beauclerk (son)

Lady Diana Beauclerk (née Lady Diana Spencer; other married name Diana St John, Viscountess Bolingbroke; 24 March 1734 – 1 August 1808) was an English noblewoman and celebrated artist.

== Early life ==
Lady Diana Spencer was born into the aristocratric Spencer family as the daughter of Charles, 3rd Duke of Marlborough (1706–1758), and the Hon. Elizabeth Trevor (d. 1761). Her siblings were George (later 4th Duke), Lord Charles Spencer, and Elizabeth, Countess of Pembroke. Her great-grandmother was the formidable Sarah Churchill, Duchess of Marlborough. She was raised at Langley Park, Buckinghamshire, where she was introduced to art at an early age. Sir Joshua Reynolds was a family friend.

== Marriages and children ==
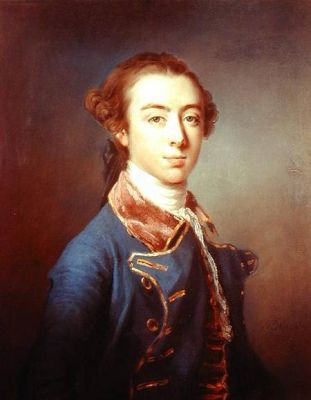
Topham Beauclerk, her second husband

On 8 September 1757, she married Frederick St John, 2nd Viscount Bolingbroke (1734–1787). From 1762 to 1768 she was Lady of the Bedchamber to Queen Charlotte. She became widely known as 'Lady Di' (as did her namesake, Diana, Princess of Wales, prior to her marriage).

Lady Diana had four children by her first marriage:

- George St John, 3rd Viscount Bolingbroke (5 March 1761 — 11 December 1824)
- Henriette St John (1 Aug 1762 — April 1834), married in 1792 Henry Towcester
- Anne (born ca. 1764, and did not survive infancy)
- General Frederick St John (20 December 1765 — 19 November 1844), MP for Oxford, married Lady Mary Kerr (died 1791), the Hon. Arabella Craven (died 1819) and Caroline Parsons (died 1869).

Finding herself in a desperately unhappy marriage to the notoriously unfaithful Viscount Bolingbroke, Lady Di overturned convention. She left her husband and maintained a secret relationship with her lover, Topham Beauclerk. In February 1768 Bolingbroke petitioned for divorce on grounds of adultery ("criminal conversation"). The petition required an Act of Parliament, which was passed the next month.

Within two days, she married Topham Beauclerk, of Old Windsor, Berkshire. They had three children:

- Elisabeth Beauclerk (20 August 1766 – 25 March 1793), married her cousin, George Herbert, 11th Earl of Pembroke
- (Anne) Mary Day Beauclerk (29 June or 20 August 1766 – 23 July 1851), twin of Elisabeth. She famously had a long-term relationship with her own half-brother Bolingbroke, and had four sons by him. After he abandoned her, she married in 1797 Franz von Jenison-Walworth (1764–1824), a German count of English parentage (son of Count Francis von Jenison zu Walworth), and had legitimate issue, 2 sons (one son deceased) and four daughters. (Her descendants via her youngest daughter Emilie (or Amalie) include the Princes of Loewenstein-Wertheim-Freudenberg, and through them, other German royalty).
- Charles George Beauclerk (20 January 1774 – 25 December 1846), M.P. for Richmond (1796-98), in 1799 he married Emily Charlotte Ogilvie, daughter of Emily Mary Lennox, Duchess of Leinster, by her second husband, William Ogilvie. He is ancestor of the Beauclerks, Marquises of Valero de Urría.

== Friends ==
Part of a stipple engraving, published by John Boydell in 1782, after Lady Diana's 1779 drawing of her friend and cousin Georgiana Cavendish.

Their circle of friends included Samuel Johnson, Georgiana Cavendish — who maintained a glittering salon — Edward Gibbon, David Garrick, Charles James Fox, James Boswell and Edmund Burke.

Fanny Burney recorded in her diary the feelings of Edmund Burke about Lady Diana after the death of Topham Beauclerk:

From the window of the dining-parlour, Sir Joshua Reynolds directed us to look at a pretty white house which belonged to Lady Di. Beauclerk.

"I am extremely glad," said Mr. Burke, "to see her at last so well housed; poor woman! the bowl has long rolled in misery; I rejoice that it has now found its balance. I never, myself, so much enjoyed the sight of happiness in another, as in that woman when I first saw her after the death of her husband. It was really enlivening to behold her placed in that sweet house, released from all her cares, a thousand pounds a year at her own disposal, and — her husband was dead! Oh, it was pleasant, it was delightful to see her enjoyment of her situation!"

"But, without considering the circumstances" said Mr. Gibbon, "this may appear very strange, though, when they are fairly stated, it is perfectly rational and unavoidable." "Very true," said Mr. Burke, "if the circumstances are not considered, Lady Di. may seem highly reprehensible."

He then, addressing himself particularly to me, as the person least likely to be acquainted with the character of Mr. Beauclerk, drew it himself in strong and marked expressions, describing the misery he gave his wife, his singular ill-treatment of her, and the necessary relief the death of such a man must give.

On the other hand, James Boswell records that Samuel Johnson said of her (in 1773), "The woman's a whore and there's an end on't."

== Artistic work ==
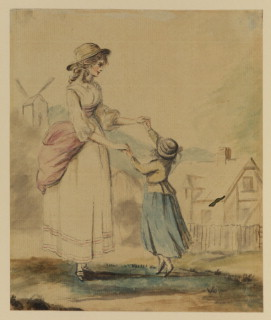
"Lady and child dancing", by Lady Diana Beauclerk

Lady Diana eventually helped to support herself through her artwork. She painted portraits, illustrated plays and books, provided designs for Wedgwood's innovative pottery, and decorated rooms with murals. Championed by her close friend Horace Walpole, she was able to establish herself as an artist at a time when women struggled to forge careers.

Beauclerk illustrated a number of literary productions, including Horace Walpole's tragedy The Mysterious Mother, the English translation of Gottfried August Bürger's Leonora (1796) and The Fables of John Dryden (1797). After 1785 she was one of a circle of women, along with Emma Crewe and Elizabeth Templetown (1746/7-1823), whose designs for Josiah Wedgwood were made into bas-reliefs on jasper ornaments.

=== Sculpture design ===
Beauclerk designed the allegorical group, sculpted by John de Veere of the Coade Stone factory, to decorate the plain facade of the Pelican and British Empire Life Insurance Company at 70 Lombard Street in the City of London. It was rescued before building demolition in 1915 and is now displayed in the Horniman Museum.

== Later life, death, and legacy ==
Beauclerk's second husband died in 1780 and, due to restricted finances, she began to lead a more retired life. Lady Diana died in 1808 and is buried at Richmond, Surrey.

In the mid-1990s a portrait of her hung in Kenwood House, Hampstead in north London, with the caption: "Lady Diana Spencer, known chiefly for the unhappiness of her first marriage."
