= Charles Spencer, 3rd Duke of Marlborough =

British Army officer and politician (1706–1758)

Lieutenant-General His Grace The Duke of Marlborough KG PC
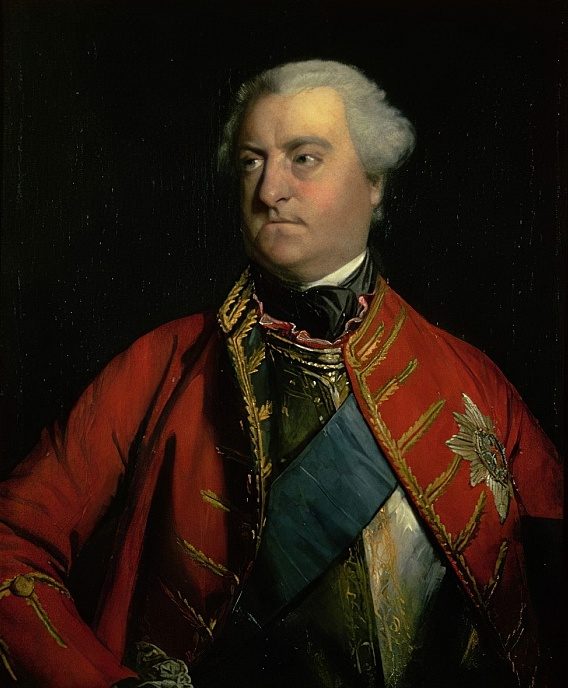
- Portrait by Sir Joshua Reynolds, c. 1759

Lord Privy Seal
- In office 8 June 1755 – 22 December 1755
- Monarch: George II
- Prime Minister: The Duke of Newcastle
- Preceded by: The Earl Gower
- Succeeded by: The Earl Gower

Lord Steward of the Household
- In office 1749–1755
- Monarch: George II
- Prime Minister: Henry Pelham; The Duke of Newcastle
- Preceded by: The Duke of Devonshire
- Succeeded by: The Duke of Rutland

Personal details
- Born: 22 November 1706
- Died: 20 October 1758 (aged 51)
- Spouse: Elizabeth Trevor
- Children: Lady Diana Beauclerk; Elizabeth Herbert, Countess of Pembroke and Montgomery; George Spencer, 4th Duke of Marlborough; Lord Charles Spencer; Lord Robert Spencer
- Parents: Charles Spencer, 3rd Earl of Sunderland; Lady Anne Churchill

Military service
- Allegiance: Great Britain
- Branch/service: British Army
- Battles/wars: Seven Years' War; Raid on St Malo

Charles Spencer, 3rd Duke of Marlborough, KG, PC (22 November 1706 – 20 October 1758), styled The Hon. Charles Spencer between 1706 and 1729 and the Earl of Sunderland between 1729 and 1733, was a British Army officer and politician who served as Lord Privy Seal in 1755. He led the British forces involved in the raid on St Malo in 1758.

== Early life ==
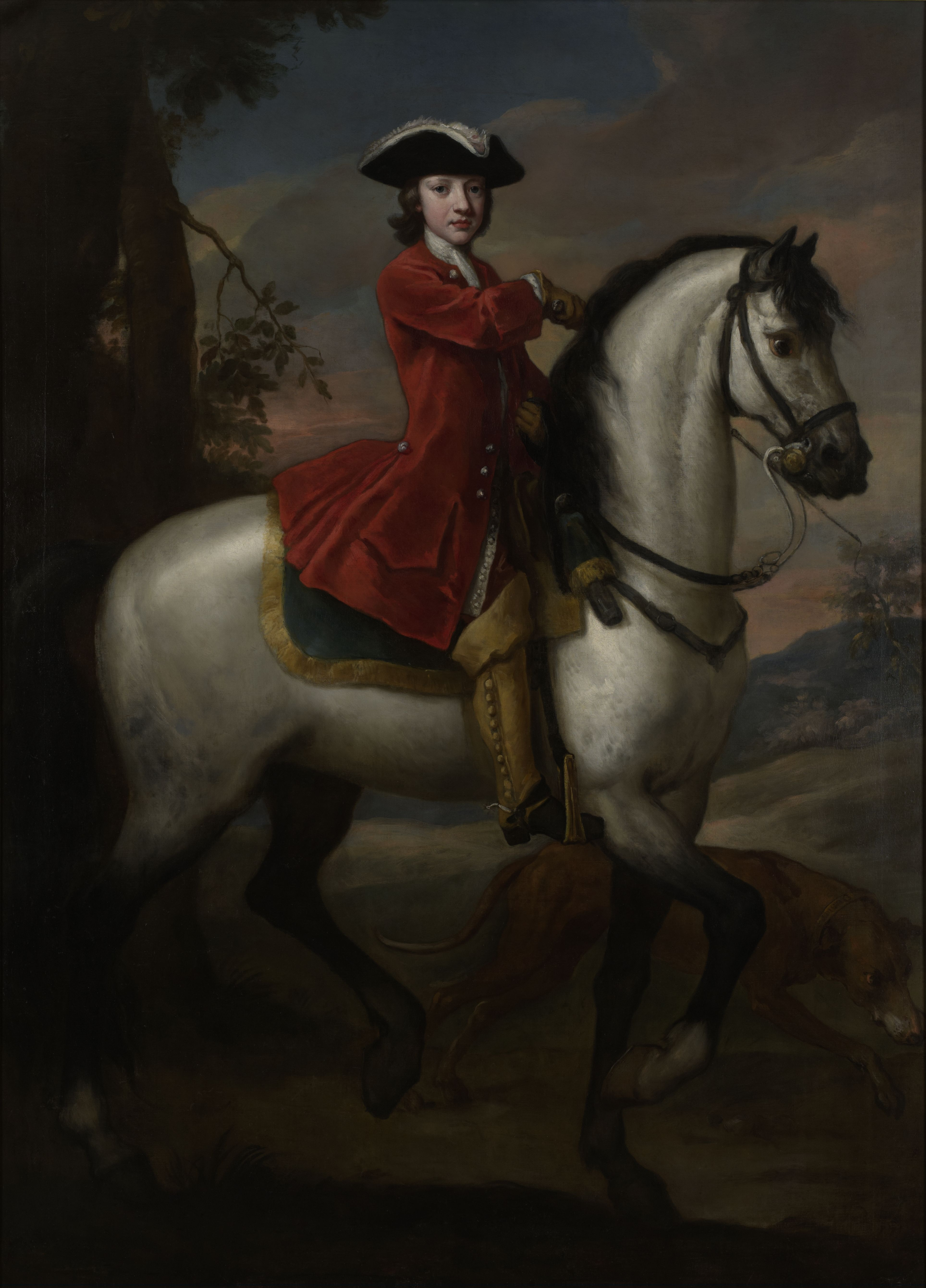
A young Charles Spencer, painted by John Vanderbank

He was the second son of Charles Spencer, 3rd Earl of Sunderland, and Lady Anne Churchill, the second daughter of John Churchill, 1st Duke of Marlborough, and his wife Sarah Churchill, Duchess of Marlborough. He inherited the Sunderland peerages from his older brother in 1729, becoming 5th Earl of Sunderland, and then the Marlborough peerages from his aunt Henrietta, Duchess of Marlborough, in 1733. At that time, he handed over the Sunderland estates to his younger brother John, but he did not obtain Blenheim Palace until Sarah, the dowager duchess, died in 1744.

On Thursday, 14 July 1737, Marlborough captained his own cricket team in a match against the Prince of Wales's XI on Kew Green. The Prince's XI are known to have won the match, which was apparently of a minor standard, although publicised because of the participants. This is the only known mention of Marlborough in a cricketing connection.

He was one of the original governors of London's Foundling Hospital, the foundation of which in 1739 marked a watershed in British child care advocacy and attitudes.

== Seven Years War ==
Marlborough is best known for his service in the early part of the Seven Years' War. He led the Raid on St Malo, a naval descent against the French coastal port. Following the Capture of Emden in 1758, he led the British expeditionary force sent to join Ferdinand of Brunswick's Army of Observation on Continental Europe, but died the same year, leaving command to John Manners, Marquess of Granby.

== Marriage and children ==
Marlborough married The Hon. Elizabeth Trevor (c. 1713 – 1761), a daughter of Thomas Trevor, 2nd Baron Trevor. They had five children:

- Lady Diana Spencer (1734–1808). Married firstly Frederick St John, 2nd Viscount Bolingbroke, and secondly Topham Beauclerk.
- Elizabeth Herbert, Countess of Pembroke and Montgomery (1737 – 1831). Married Henry Herbert, 10th Earl of Pembroke.
- George Spencer, 4th Duke of Marlborough (26 January 1739 – 29 January 1817).
- Lord Charles Spencer (31 March 1740 – 16 June 1820).
- Lord Robert Spencer (8 May 1747 – 23 June 1831)

== Personal life ==
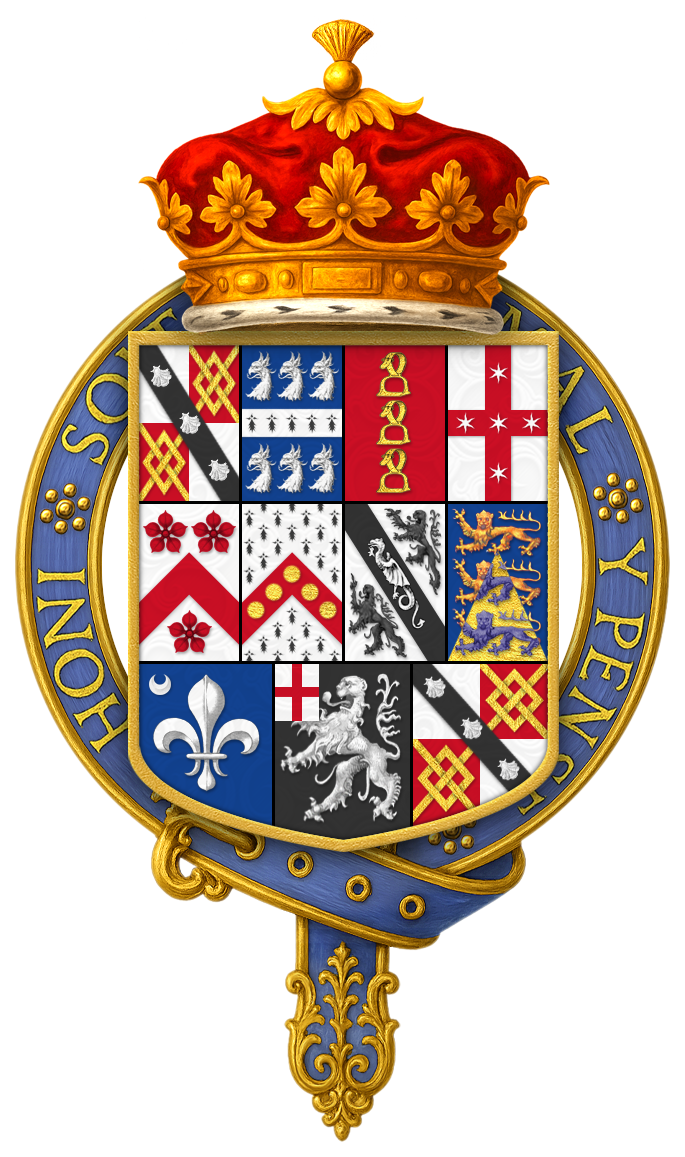
Quartered arms of Charles Spencer, 3rd Duke of Marlborough, KG

The amiable Marlborough was generally well-liked and was a loyal husband and loving father. He made sure to write to his wife frequently while on military campaigns and always sent his love to their children. He had no concept of economy, and was a heavy spender. He was so notoriously incompetent with money that when he died suddenly in 1758, acquaintances wryly remarked that he died before he could spend his heir's inheritance on the estate.

== Death ==
In October 1758, Marlborough was on a campaign in Germany when he caught dysentery that was sweeping the camp. His sudden death shocked his family, friends, and England. However, an autopsy revealed he would have died not long after, as his lungs were ravaged by the consumption that had killed his mother and sister. Surprisingly, he did not pass on the consumption to his children.

== Titles ==
- 22 November 1706 – 15 September 1729: The Honourable Charles Spencer
- 15 September 1729 – 24 October 1733: The Right Honourable the Earl of Sunderland
- 24 October 1733 – 20 October 1758: His Grace the Duke of Marlborough

== Ancestry ==
Ancestors of Charles Spencer, 3rd Duke of Marlborough

8. Henry Spencer, 1st Earl of Sunderland
4. Robert Spencer, 2nd Earl of Sunderland
9. Lady Dorothy Sidney
2. Charles Spencer, 3rd Earl of Sunderland
10. George Digby, 2nd Earl of Bristol
5. Lady Anne Digby
11. Lady Anne Russell
1. Charles Spencer, 3rd Duke of Marlborough
12. Sir Winston Churchill
6. John Churchill, 1st Duke of Marlborough
13. Elizabeth Drake
3. Lady Anne Churchill
14. Sir Richard Jennings
7. Sarah Jennings
15. Frances Thornhurst

== External Sources ==
- Lee, Sidney, ed. (1898). "Spencer, Charles (1706-1758)" . Dictionary of National Biography. Vol. 53. London: Smith, Elder & Co.

Honorary titles
Preceded by The Viscount Cobham	Lord Lieutenant of Buckinghamshire; 1739–1758	Succeeded by The Earl Temple
Preceded by The Earl of Godolphin	Lord Lieutenant of Oxfordshire; 1739–1758	Vacant Title next held by The Duke of Marlborough
Political offices
Preceded by The Duke of Devonshire	Lord Steward; 1749–1755	Succeeded by The Duke of Rutland
Preceded by The 1st Earl Gower	Lord Privy Seal; 1755	Succeeded by The 2nd Earl Gower
Military offices
Preceded by Edward Montagu	Governor of Kingston-upon-Hull; 1738–1740	Succeeded by James Dormer
Preceded by Hon. Robert Murray	Colonel of 38th Regiment of Foot; 1738–1739	Succeeded by Robert Dalzell
Preceded by Humphrey Gore	Colonel of The Royal Regiment of Dragoons; 1739–1740	Succeeded by Henry Hawley
Preceded by Earl of Hertford	Captain and Colonel of The Queen's Troop of Horse Guards; 1740–1742	Succeeded by The Lord Cadogan
Preceded by The Duke of Cumberland	Colonel of the Coldstream Regiment of Foot Guards; 1742–1744	Succeeded by The Earl of Albemarle
Preceded by The Duke of Montagu	Master-General of the Ordnance; 1755–1758	Vacant Title next held by The Viscount Ligonier
Peerage of England
Preceded by Henrietta Godolphin	Duke of Marlborough; 1733–1758	Succeeded by George Spencer
Preceded by Robert Spencer	Earl of Sunderland; 1729–1758	Succeeded by George Spencer
