= Bloomsbury Gang =

British 18th-century socio-political group

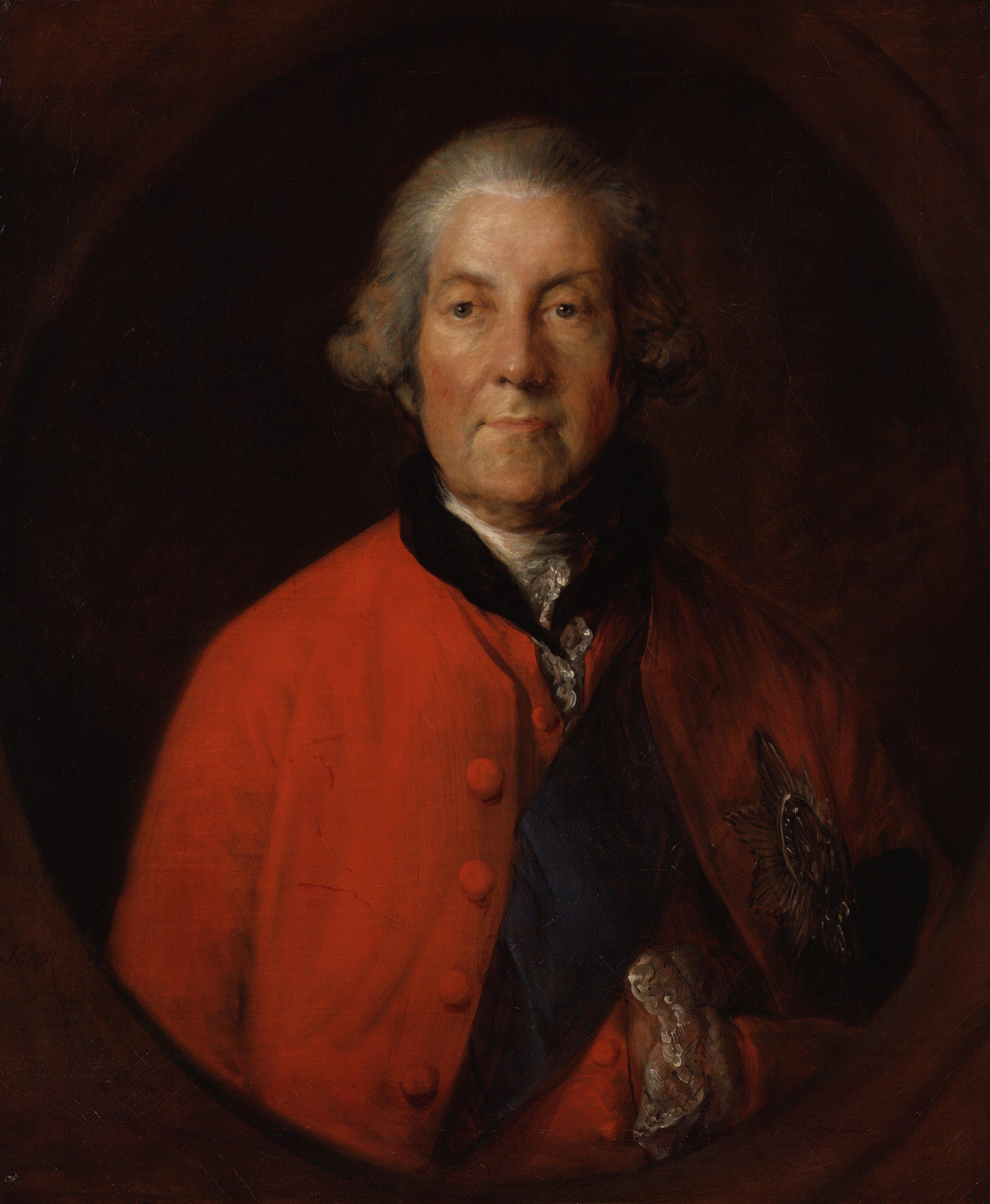
The Duke of Bedford, painted by Thomas Gainsborough in c. 1770, around whom the Bloomsburg Gang coalesced

The Bloomsbury Gang was an 18th-century socio-political group of British aristocrats, initially centered around the influential statesman John Russell, 4th Duke of Bedford and his Bedfordite allies. While born out of Whiggism and contemporarily aligned to the Whig interest, the group were subsequently identified as "Conservative Whigs" and have been described as a re-emergence of a Tory-Court party leadership following the end of the Tories as an effective political entity in 1760. The group took its name from Bloomsbury, a district of central London now in the London Borough of Camden and the location of the Duke of Bedford's townhouse.

The Bloomsbury Gang emerged as a political grouping between 1765 and 1768. The group comprised the heads of several intermarried, aristocratic families dedicated to Old Whig values, conservative principles and patriotic sentiments. Alongside the Duke of Bedford, it included Granville Leveson-Gower, 2nd Earl Gower, Henry Howard, 12th Earl of Suffolk and Thomas Thynne, 3rd Viscount Weymouth. These peers formed the ruling core of the wider Bedfordite faction. They made informal alliances and coalitions with others aligned to the court of George III – "The King's Friends" – and supported the newly activist role of the king in government, including his rights over pregogative and patronage. Unlike the old Tory party, however, the Bloomsbury Gang worked in cooperation with the monarch, rather than being ruled exclusively by the church interest.

By the autumn of 1768, the Bloomsbury Gang emerged as the prevailing influence over the Grafton ministry, even though not all of its members joined the government. A. S. Turberville wrote that "The gang was a coterie of self-seekers, whose one motive in political life seems to have been personal gain, yet who made themselves so powerful that they could never be ignored and contrived for a time... to make themselves indispensable". At this stage, the Bedford-Gower-Weymouth faction controlled around 32 personal followers in the House of Commons of Great Britain, while the Earl of Sandwich controlled a further 14 to 18 members of parliament. It continued as a faction under the leadership of Earl Gower following the 4th Duke of Bedford's death in 1770. Under Earl Gower, the Bloomsbury Gang increasingly came to represent the doctrines of a new Toryism, while continuing to use the label of Whig. In doing so, they formed the basis of the political opinion which saw the British political settlement under a constitutional monarch as well balanced, a belief which would strongly influence politicians such as William Pitt the Younger. The Bloosmbury Gang, alongside the wider Bedfordite faction, ceased to exist as a distinct political group following the victory of the Pittites in the 1784 British general election.
