= Lord Spencer =

Lord Spencer may refer to:

- Earl Spencer (peerage), an English title of nobility
- Lord Charles Spencer (1740–1820)
- Lord Henry Spencer (1770–1795)
- Michael Spencer, Baron Spencer of Alresford (born 1955)

== See also ==
- Hugh Despenser (justiciar) (1223–1265), Baron le Despencer
- Hugh le Despencer, Baron le Despencer (1338) (1308–1349)
