= Caroline Spencer, Duchess of Marlborough =

Duchess of Marlborough

Her Grace The Duchess of Marlborough
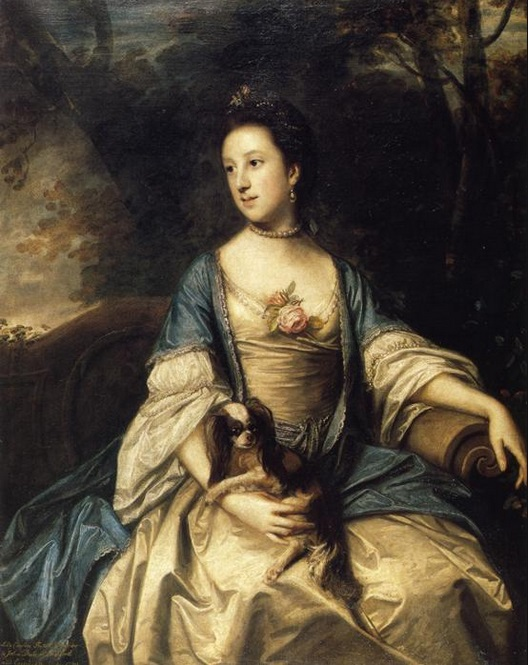
- Caroline, Duchess of Marlborough, by Sir Joshua Reynolds
- Born: Lady Caroline Russell; 13 January 1743
- Died: 26 November 1811 (aged 68); Blenheim Palace
- Spouse: George Spencer, 4th Duke of Marlborough (m. 1762)
- Issue: Caroline Ellis, Viscountess Clifden; Lady Elizabeth Spencer; George Spencer-Churchill, 5th Duke of Marlborough; Lady Charlotte Nares; Lord Henry John Spencer; Anne Ashley-Cooper, Countess of Shaftesbury; Lady Amelia Pytches Boyce; Francis Spencer, 1st Baron Churchill
- Father: John Russell, 4th Duke of Bedford
- Mother: Gertrude Leveson-Gower

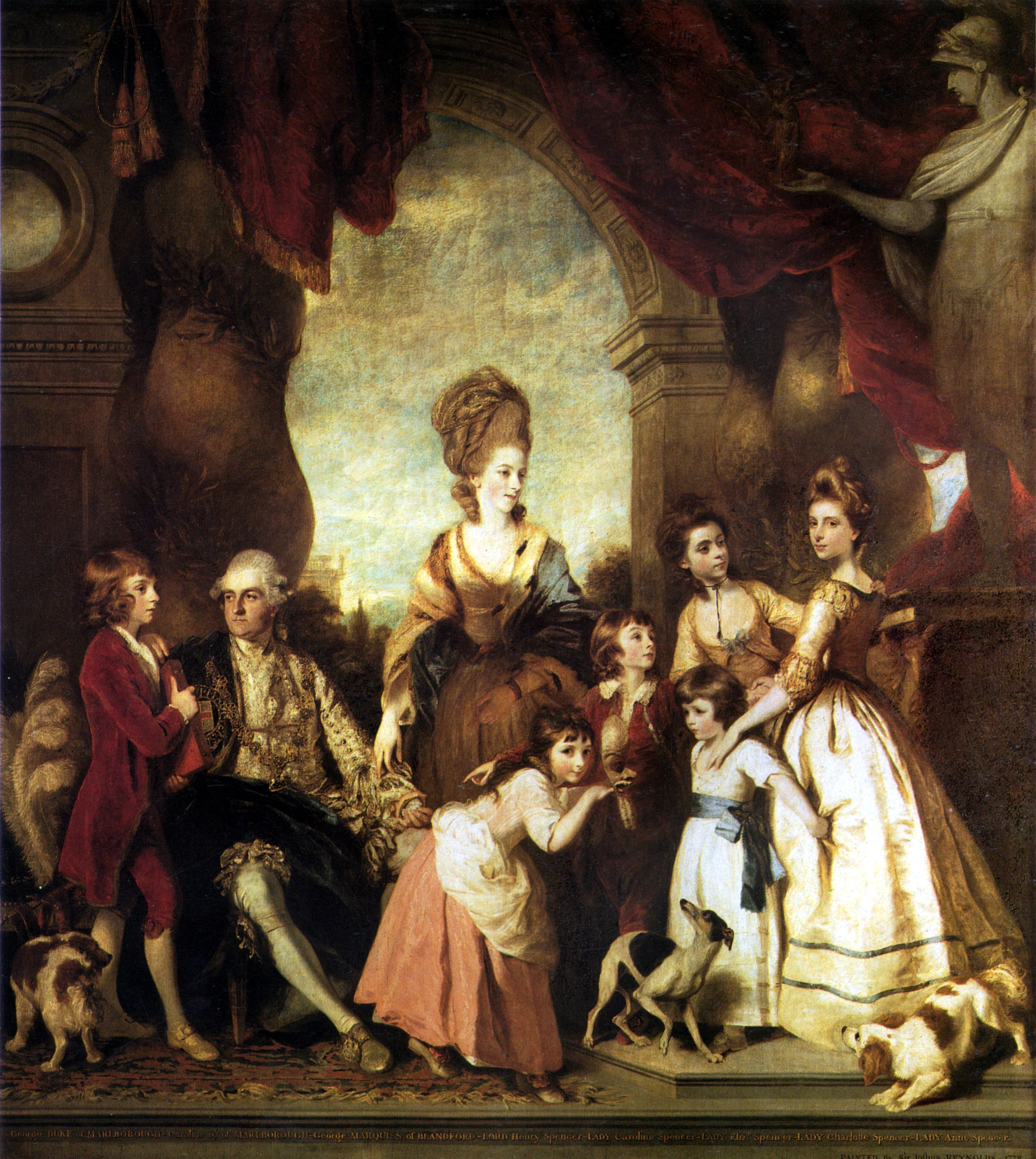
The 4th Duke of Marlborough and his family, by Sir Joshua Reynolds

Caroline Spencer, Duchess of Marlborough (13 January 1743 – 26 November 1811), formerly Lady Caroline Russell, was the wife of George Spencer, 4th Duke of Marlborough.

== Early life ==
Lady Caroline was born on 13 January 1743. She was the daughter of John Russell, 4th Duke of Bedford, and his second wife, the former Gertrude Leveson-Gower. Her father served as the British Ambassador to France and Lord President of the Council. Her brother was Francis Russell, Marquess of Tavistock (the father of her nephews Francis Russell, 5th Duke of Bedford, and John Russell, 6th Duke of Bedford).

Her paternal grandparents were Wriothesley Russell, 2nd Duke of Bedford and the former Elizabeth Howland (the daughter and heiress of John Howland of Streatham, Surrey). Her maternal grandparents were John Leveson-Gower, 1st Earl Gower and the former Lady Evelyn Pierrepont (a daughter of Evelyn Pierrepont, 1st Duke of Kingston-upon-Hull).

== Personal life ==
On 23 August 1762, Lady Caroline was married to George Spencer, 4th Duke of Marlborough at Bedford House in Bloomsbury, London. George was a son of Charles Spencer, 3rd Duke of Marlborough and the former the Hon. Elizabeth Trevor (daughter of Thomas Trevor, 2nd Baron Trevor). Together, they were the parents of:

- Lady Caroline Spencer (1763–1813), who married Henry Agar-Ellis, 2nd Viscount Clifden and had issue, including George Agar-Ellis, 1st Baron Dover.
- Lady Elizabeth Spencer (1764–1812), who married her cousin John Spencer (a grandson of the 3rd Duke of Marlborough) and had issue.
- George Spencer-Churchill, 5th Duke of Marlborough (1766–1840).
- Lady Charlotte Spencer (1769–1802), who married the Rev. Edward Nares and had issue.
- Lord Henry John Spencer (1770–1795).
- Lady Anne Spencer (1773–1865), who married Cropley Ashley-Cooper, 6th Earl of Shaftesbury and had issue.
- Lady Amelia Spencer (1774–1829), who married Henry Pytches Boyce.
- Lord Francis Almeric Spencer (1779–1845), created Baron Churchill in 1815.

The Duchess died at Blenheim Palace on 26 November 1811. The Duke died on 29 January 1817.

=== Legacy ===
A letter survives from Caroline to Ozias Humphrey, which has been approximately dated to 1788. In it, she refers to a portrait drawing of her husband by Thomas Gainsborough. Gainsborough having died in 1788, she asks Humphrey to complete the painted portrait. Caroline and her husband were also painted together by William Austin. Her own portrait, as a child, had been painted by Jean-Étienne Liotard around 1754. She was also painted by Sir Joshua Reynolds around the time of her marriage, and later, with her eldest daughter.

Queen Charlotte is reputed to have called Caroline "the proudest woman in England". She died on 26 November 1811 and was buried at Blenheim Palace.
