= The Family of the Earl Gower =

1772 oil painting by Angelica Kauffman

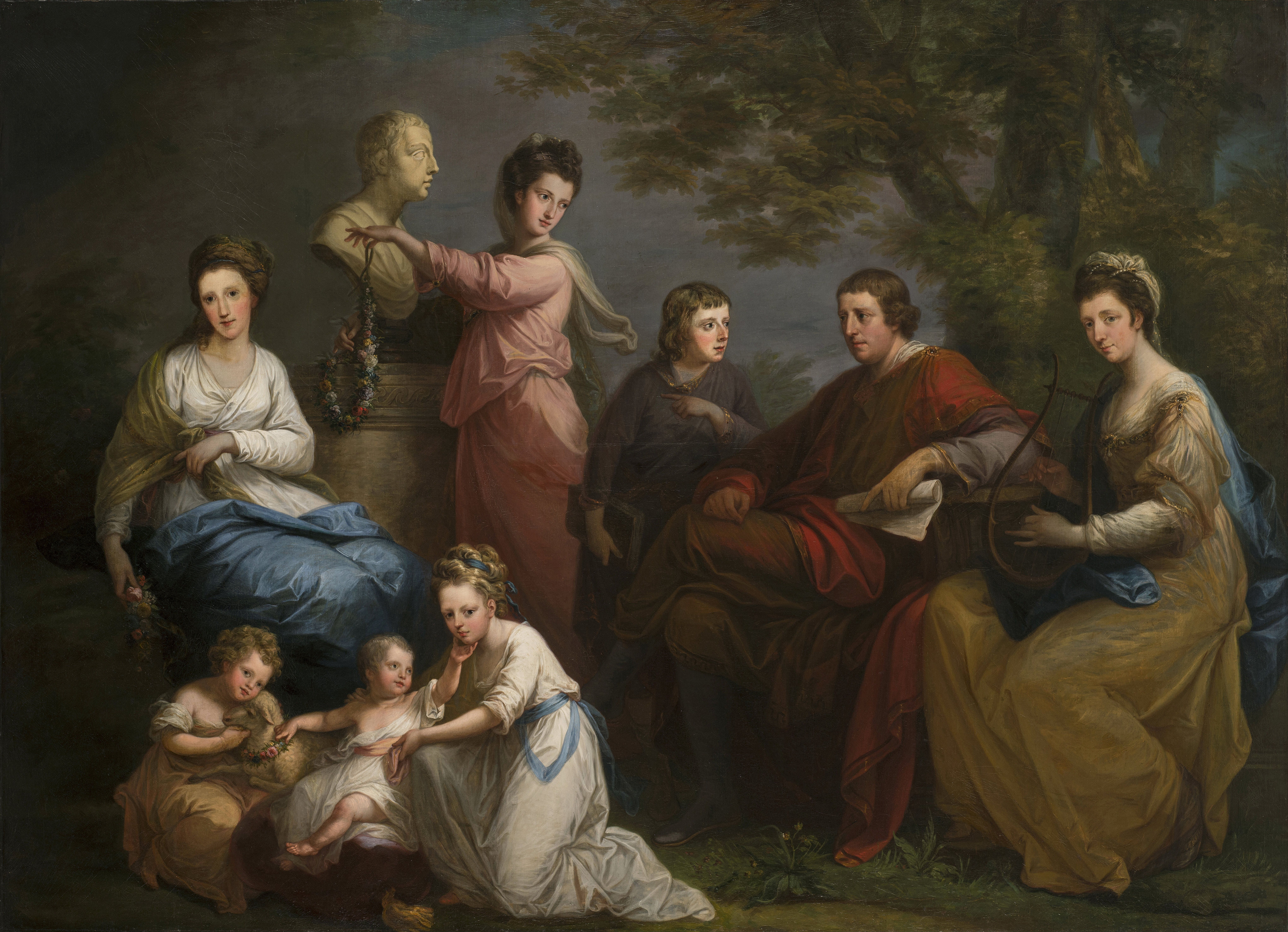
- Artist: Angelica Kauffman
- Year: 1772
- Medium: oil on canvas
- Subject: Granville Leveson-Gower, 1st Marquess of Stafford with his third wife Susanna and six children
- Dimensions: 150.5 cm × 210 cm (59.25 in × 82 in)
- Location: National Museum of Women in the Arts, Washington, D.C., United States
- Owner: National Museum of Women in the Arts

The Family of the Earl Gower is a 1772 painting by Swiss painter Angelica Kauffman. It is held by the National Museum of Women in the Arts in Washington, D.C., United States.

It portrays Granville Leveson-Gower, 1st Marquess of Stafford (1721-1803), also known as The Earl Gower, an English Whig politician and cabinet minister, and his family. His third wife, Lady Susanna (1742-1805) holds a lyre, and his heir, George Leveson-Gower (1758-1833, later the Duke of Sutherland) holds a book, while the three youngest daughters play with a lamb.

The painting is in oil on canvas and measures 59.25 in × 82 in (1,505 mm × 2,083 mm).

Another famous painting of the family by George Romney is titled The Gower Family: The Children of Granville, 2nd Earl Gower.
