= Granville Leveson-Gower, 1st Marquess of Stafford =

British politician (1721–1803)

The Most Honourable The Marquess of Stafford KG PC
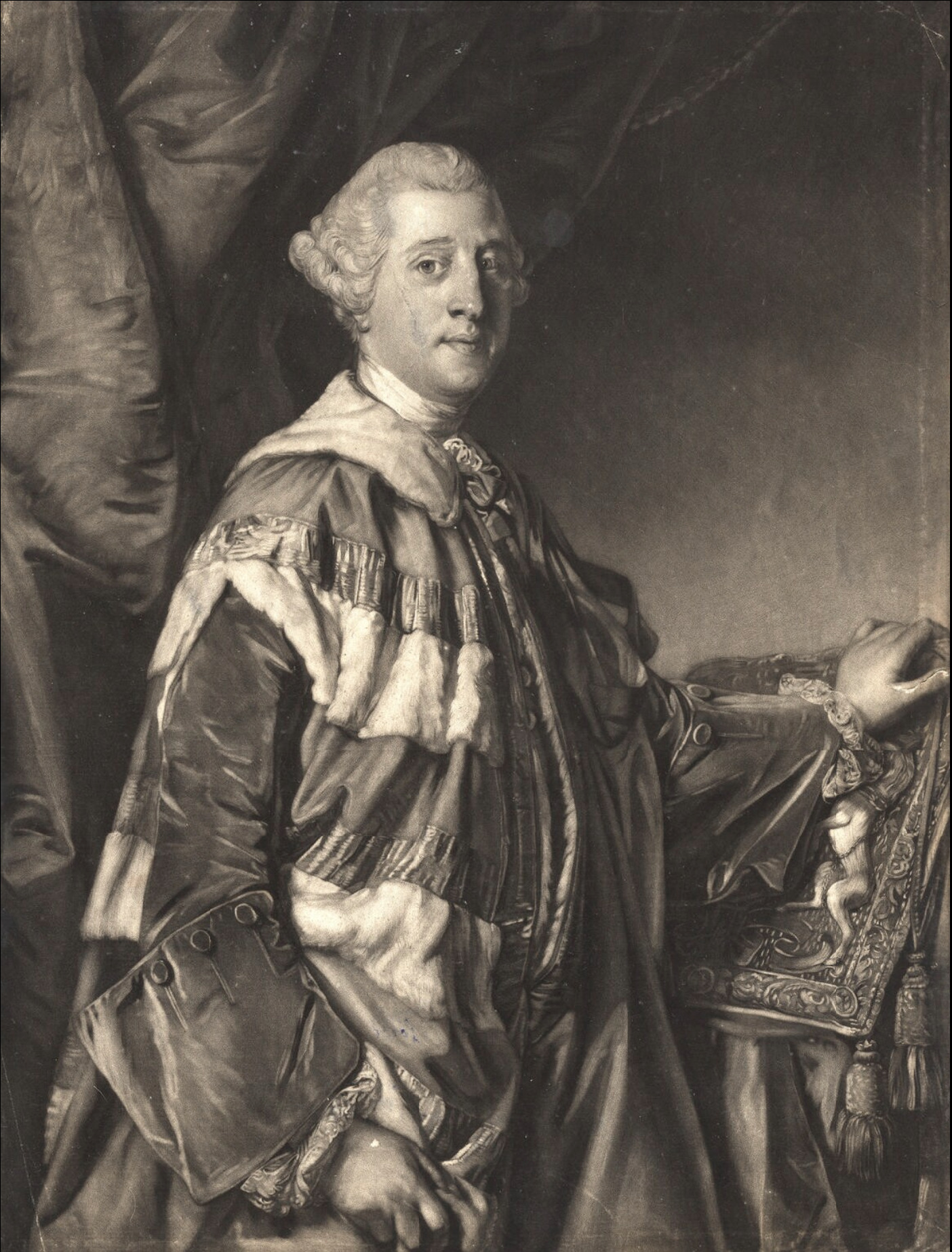
- Engraving by Edward Fisher after a portrait by Sir Joshua Reynolds, 1765

Lord Privy Seal
- In office 22 December 1755 – 30 June 1757
- Monarch: George II
- Prime Minister: Thomas Pelham-Holles, 1st Duke of Newcastle-upon-Tyne; William Cavendish, 4th Duke of Devonshire
- Preceded by: Charles Spencer, 3rd Duke of Marlborough
- Succeeded by: Richard Grenville-Temple, 2nd Earl Temple
- In office 27 November 1784 – 1794
- Monarch: George III
- Prime Minister: William Pitt the Younger
- Preceded by: Charles Manners, 4th Duke of Rutland
- Succeeded by: George Spencer, 2nd Earl Spencer

Lord President of the Council
- In office 22 December 1767 – 24 November 1779
- Monarch: George III
- Prime Minister: William Pitt, 1st Earl of Chatham; Augustus FitzRoy, 3rd Duke of Grafton; Frederick North, Lord North
- Preceded by: Robert Henley, 1st Earl of Northington
- Succeeded by: Henry Bathurst, 2nd Earl Bathurst
- In office 19 December 1783 – 1 December 1784
- Monarch: George III
- Prime Minister: William Pitt the Younger
- Preceded by: David Murray, 7th Viscount Stormont
- Succeeded by: Charles Pratt, 1st Earl Camden

Personal details
- Born: 4 August 1721
- Died: 26 October 1803 (aged 82) Trentham Hall, Staffordshire
- Party: Tory
- Spouse(s): (1) Elizabeth Fazakerley (d. 1745) (2) Lady Louisa Egerton (d. 1761) (3) Lady Susanna Stewart (d. 1805)
- Children: George Leveson-Gower, 1st Duke of Sutherland; Lady Louisa MacDonald; Margaret Howard, Countess of Carlisle; Lady Anne Venables-Vernon-Harcourt; Georgiana Eliot, Countess of St Germans; Charlotte Somerset, Duchess of Beaufort; Susan Ryder, Countess of Harrowby; Granville Leveson-Gower, 1st Earl Granville
- Parent(s): John Leveson-Gower, 1st Earl Gower; Lady Evelyn Pierrepont
- Education: Christ Church, Oxford

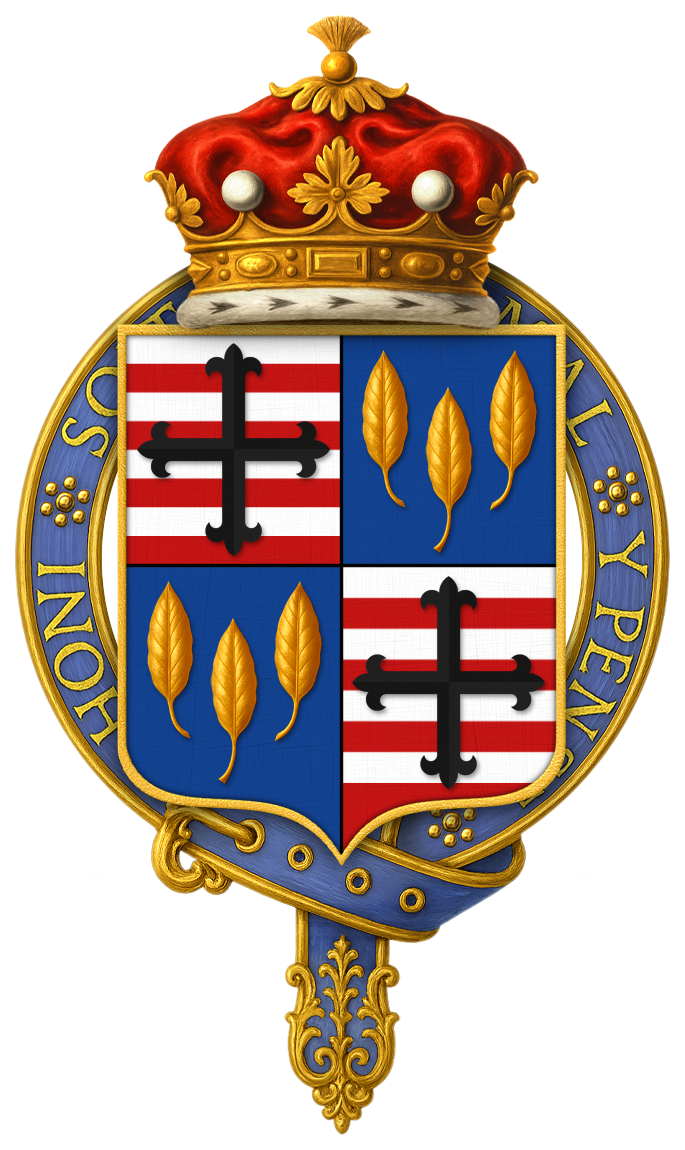
Quartered coat of arms of Granville Leveson-Gower, 1st Marquess of Stafford, KG, PC

Granville Leveson-Gower, 1st Marquess of Stafford, KG PC (4 August 1721 – 26 October 1803), known as Viscount Trentham from 1746 to 1754 and as The Earl Gower from 1754 to 1786, was a British Whig politician from the Leveson-Gower family. Sitting in the House of Lords, he spent a quarter of a century in the Cabinet.

== Background ==
Stafford was a son of John Leveson-Gower, 1st Earl Gower (1694–1754) and his wife Lady Evelyn Pierrepont. His maternal grandparents were Evelyn Pierrepont, 1st Duke of Kingston-upon-Hull and his first wife Lady Mary Feilding. Mary was a daughter of William Feilding, 3rd Earl of Denbigh and his wife Mary King. His father was a prominent Tory politician who became the first major Tory to enter government since the succession of George I of Great Britain, joining the administration of John Carteret, 2nd Earl Granville in 1742. Gower was educated at Westminster School and Christ Church, Oxford.

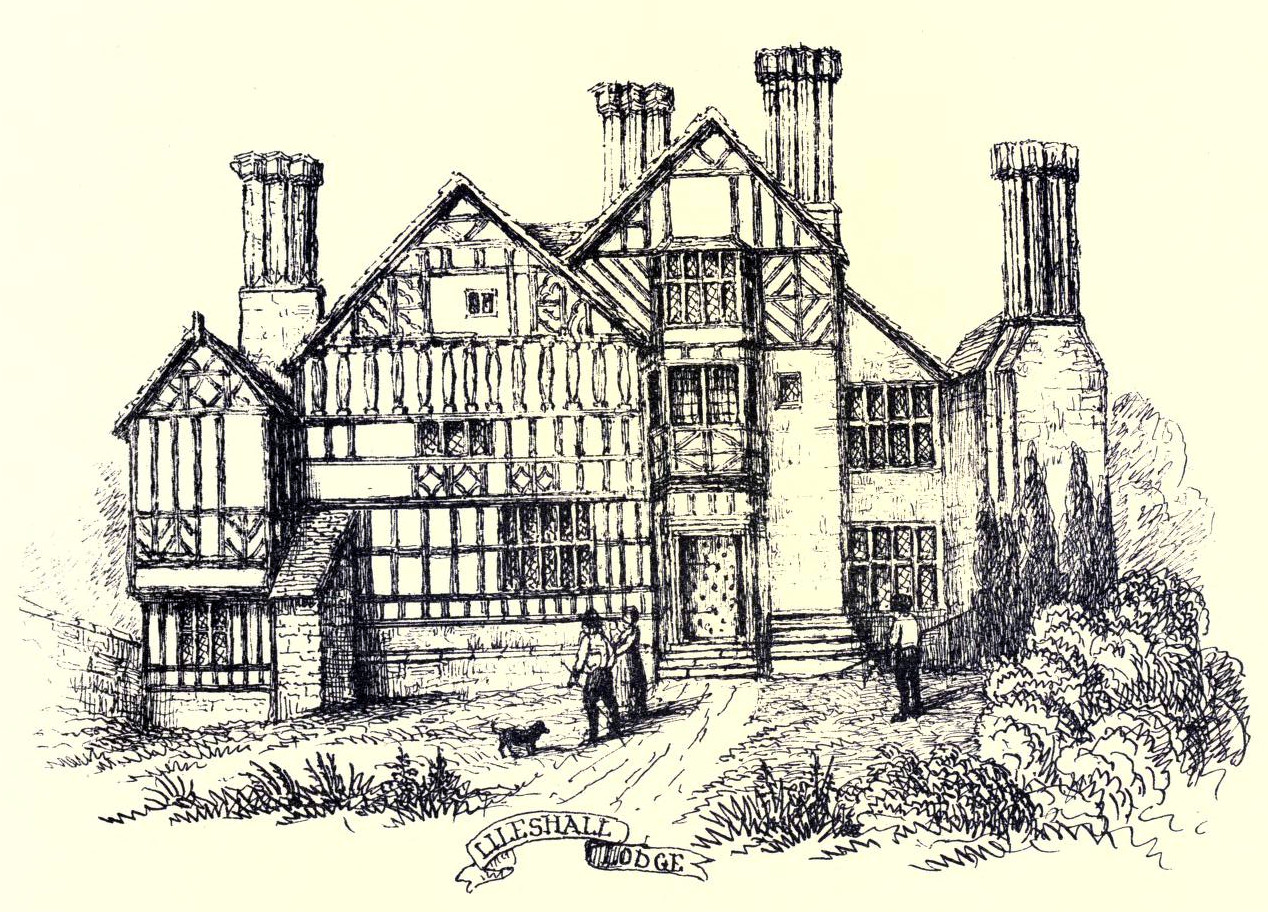
Lodge at Lilleshall Abbey, home of the Leveson family after the Dissolution of the Monasteries.

== Political and industrial investment career ==
Stafford was elected to Parliament in 1744, and contested the highly contentious 1750 Westminster by-election upon his appointment to the Broad Bottom ministry as a lord of the admiralty in 1749.

With the death of his elder brother in 1746, he became known by the courtesy title of Viscount Trentham until he succeeded his father as Earl Gower in 1754. He built the earlier Lilleshall Hall, converting a 17th-century house located in the village of Lilleshall into a country residence around the late 1750s.

Stafford was associated with the faction of John Russell, 4th Duke of Bedford, who was his brother-in-law, and as a member of that faction, called the "Bloomsbury Gang", was given many governmental positions. Following Bedford's death in 1771, Gower became leader of the group, and as Lord President of the Council in the administration of Frederick North, Lord North, he was a key supporter of a hard-line policy towards the American colonists. Between 1775 and 1778, Stafford proceeded to make substantial alterations to his home at Trentham Hall based on the designs by Henry Holland.

By 1779, Gower resigned from the cabinet being frustrated by what he saw as the North administration's inept handling of the American Revolutionary War. When North resigned in March 1782, Gower was approached to form a ministry, but he refused, and he refused subsequent overtures from both Lord Shelburne and the Fox-North coalition to enter the government. Instead, he became a key figure in bringing about the fall of the Fox-North coalition, and was rewarded with the position of Lord President once again in the new administration of William Pitt the Younger. Although he soon exchanged this office for that of Lord Privy Seal, and gradually began to withdraw from public affairs, he remained a cabinet minister until his retirement later in 1794. In 1786, he was created Marquess of Stafford as a reward for his services. He was elected Fellow of the Society of Antiquaries (FSA) on 28 April 1784.

In 1799 he (or his immediate family benefit trust) was estimated the fifth-wealthiest small family unit in Britain, owning £2.1 million (equivalent to £210 million in 2025), having assets in land, mining and arterial canal-toll rights having speculatively invested in the latter projects, much of which was in Staffordshire's Black Country.

He died at Trentham Hall, Staffordshire, on 26 October 1803. He was the last surviving member of the Bloomsbury Gang.

== Marriages and children ==
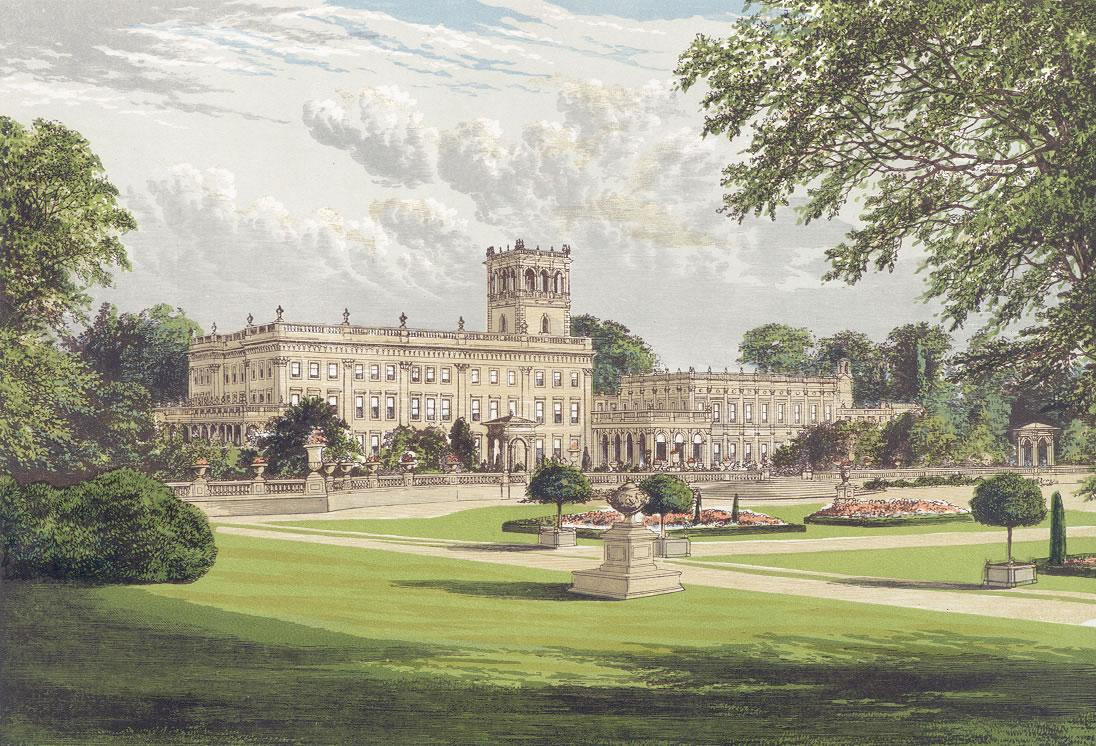
Trentham Hall, 1880

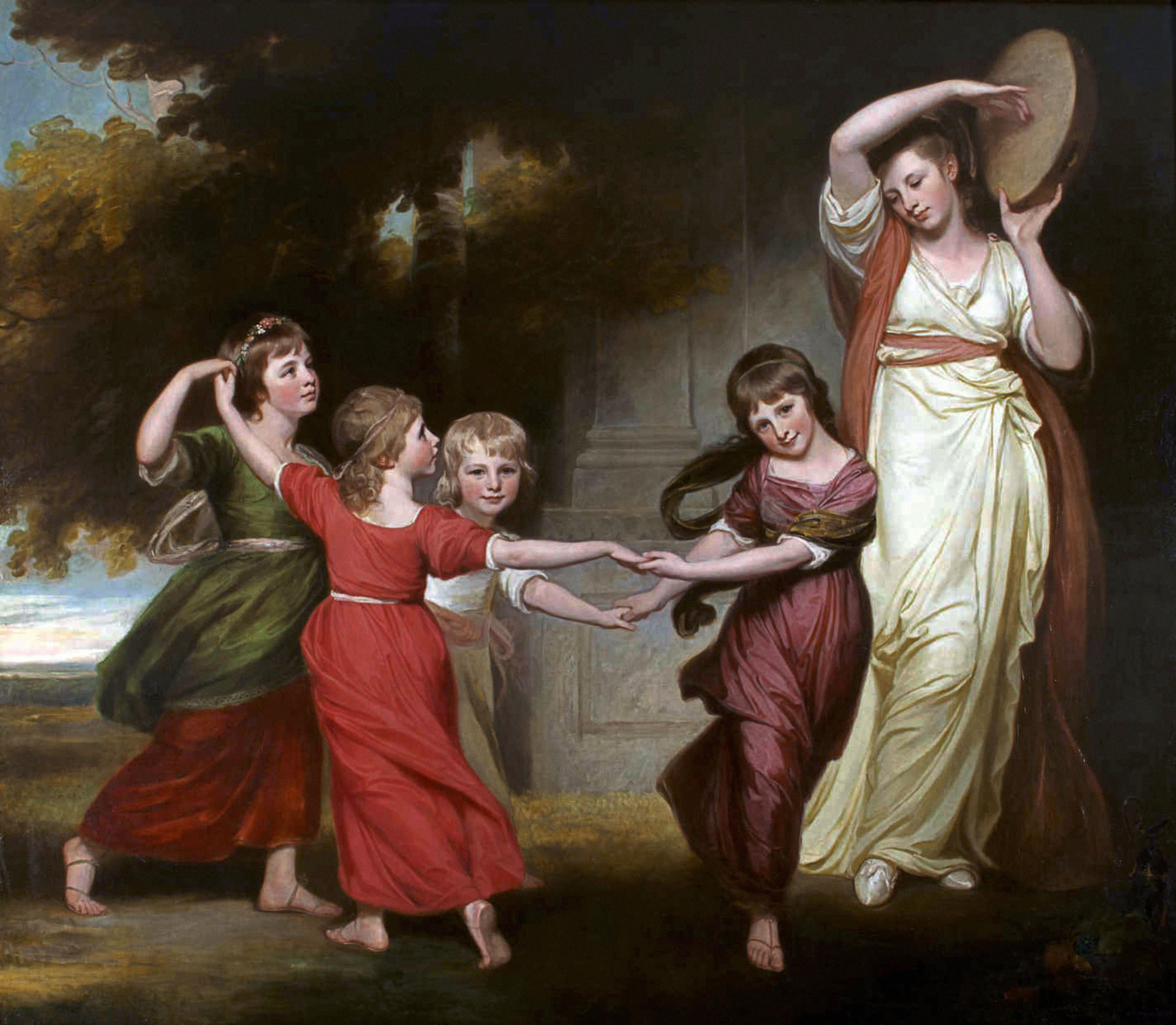
The Gower Family: The Children of Granville, 2nd Earl Gower, painting by George Romney. The woman on the right, holding a tambourine, is Lady Anne, Lord Gower’s daughter by his second wife. The other children are his son and daughters from his third marriage: (left to right) Lady Georgina, Lady Susan, the Hon. Granville and Lady Charlotte Sophia.

Stafford married three times. On 23 December 1744, he married firstly Elizabeth Fazakerley, daughter of Nicholas Fazakerley, with a dowry of £16,000 (equivalent to £3,442,000 in 2025). She died on 19 May 1745 of smallpox, the day after giving birth to a son, John, who died shortly after birth.

Stafford married secondly Lady Louisa Egerton, daughter of Scroop Egerton, 1st Duke of Bridgewater, in 1748. She died in 1761. They were parents to four children:

- Lady Louisa Leveson-Gower (22 October 1749 – 29 July 1827), married Sir Archibald MacDonald, 1st Baronet.
- Lady Margaret Caroline Leveson-Gower (2 November 1753 – 27 January 1824), married Frederick Howard, 5th Earl of Carlisle and was the mother of George Howard, 6th Earl of Carlisle.
- George Leveson-Gower, 1st Duke of Sutherland (9 January 1758 – 19 July 1833), succeeded in titles
- Lady Anne Leveson-Gower (22 February 1761 – 16 November 1832), married the Right Reverend the Hon. Edward Venables-Vernon-Harcourt, Archbishop of York.

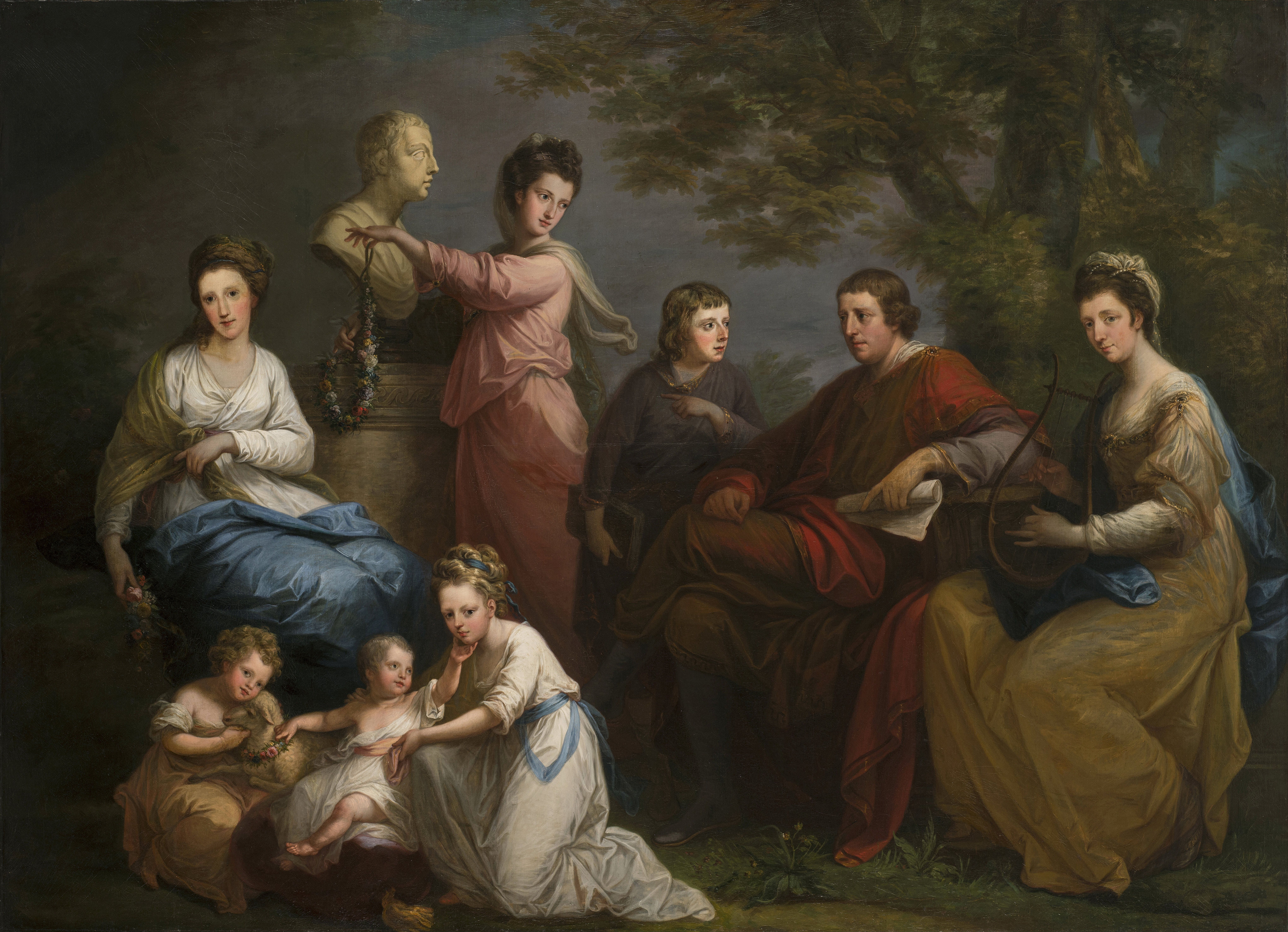
The Family of the Earl Gower (1772) by Angelica Kauffman

Stafford married thirdly Lady Susanna Stewart, daughter of Alexander Stewart, 6th Earl of Galloway, 23 May 1768. They were parents to four children:

- Lady Georgiana Augusta Leveson-Gower (13 April 1769 – 24 March 1806), married William Eliot, 2nd Earl of St Germans.
- Lady Charlotte Sophia Leveson-Gower (11 February 1771 – 12 August 1854), married Henry Somerset, 6th Duke of Beaufort and was mother of Henry Somerset, 7th Duke of Beaufort and Lord Granville Somerset
- Lady Susanna Leveson-Gower (christened 15 September 1772 – 26 May 1838), married Dudley Ryder, 1st Earl of Harrowby
- Granville Leveson-Gower, 1st Earl Granville (12 October 1773 – 8 January 1846), created Earl Granville

When Lord Stafford died at the age of 82, he was succeeded in his titles by his eldest son Lord George, who was created Duke of Sutherland in 1833. The Marchioness of Stafford died in August 1805.

Parliament of Great Britain
Preceded by Henry Brydges, Marquess of Carnarvon; Andrew Hill	Member of Parliament for Bishop's Castle; 1744–1747; With: Andrew Hill	Succeeded by Samuel Child; John Robinson Lytton
Preceded by John Perceval, Viscount Perceval; Charles Edwin	Member of Parliament for Westminster; 1747–1754; With: Sir Peter Warren 1747–53; Edward Cornwallis 1753–54	Succeeded by Sir John Crosse; Edward Cornwallis
Preceded by Henry Vernon; Thomas Anson	Member of Parliament for Lichfield; 1754; With: Thomas Anson	Succeeded by Henry Vernon; Thomas Anson
Political offices
Preceded by Charles Spencer, 3rd Duke of Marlborough	Lord Privy Seal; 1755–1757	Succeeded by Richard Grenville-Temple, 2nd Earl Temple
Preceded by Lionel Sackville, 1st Duke of Dorset	Master of the Horse; 1757–1760	Succeeded by Francis Hastings, 10th Earl of Huntingdon
Preceded by George Spencer, 4th Duke of Marlborough	Lord Chamberlain; 1763–1765	Succeeded by William Henry Cavendish-Bentinck, 3rd Duke of Portland
Preceded by Robert Henley, 1st Earl of Northington	Lord President of the Council; 1767–1779	Succeeded by Henry Bathurst, 2nd Earl Bathurst
Preceded by David Murray, 7th Viscount Stormont	Lord President of the Council; 1783–1784	Succeeded by Charles Pratt, 1st Earl Camden
Preceded by Charles Manners, 4th Duke of Rutland	Lord Privy Seal; 1784–1794	Succeeded by George Spencer, 2nd Earl Spencer
Court offices
Preceded by Sir Thomas Robinson	Master of the Great Wardrobe; 1760–1763	Succeeded by Francis Dashwood, 11th Baron le Despencer
Honorary titles
Preceded by John Leveson-Gower, 1st Earl Gower	Lord Lieutenant and Custos Rotulorum of Staffordshire; 1755–1799	Succeeded by George Leveson-Gower, 3rd Earl Gower
Preceded by Wills Hill, 1st Marquess of Downshire	Senior Privy Counsellor; 1793–1803	Succeeded by George Townshend, 1st Marquess Townshend
Peerage of Great Britain
New creation	Marquess of Stafford; 1786–1803	Succeeded by George Leveson-Gower
Preceded by John Leveson-Gower	Earl Gower; 1754–1803	Succeeded by George Leveson-Gower
Peerage of England
Preceded by John Leveson-Gower	Baron Gower; 1754–1799	Succeeded by George Leveson-Gower
