= The Protester (periodical) =

1753 British political weekly magazine

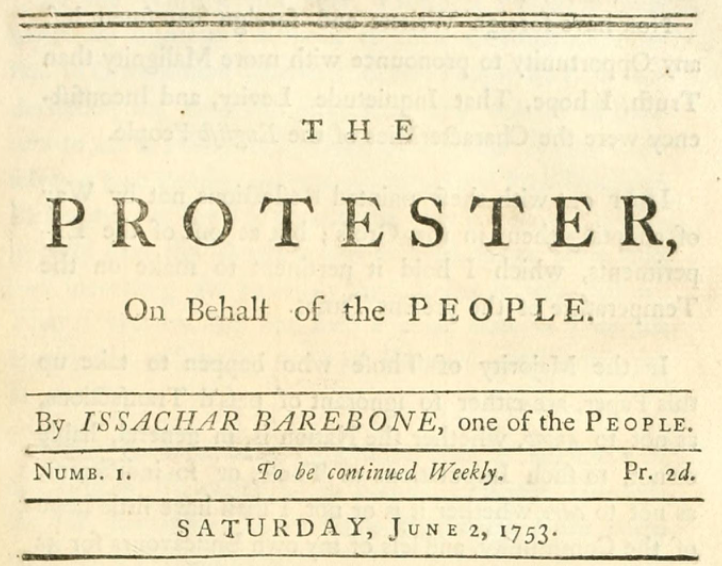
- Editor: James Ralph
- Categories: Politics
- Frequency: Weekly
- Publisher: J. Bouquet
- First issue: 2 June 1753
- Final issue: 10 November 1753
- Country: Kingdom of Great Britain
- Based in: London (Paternoster Row)
- Language: English

The Protester was a short-lived British political weekly published in London from 2 June to 10 November 1753. Printed for J. Bouquet in Paternoster Row and associated with the Bedford Whigs, it was edited and largely written by James Ralph under the pseudonym “Issachar Barebone, one of the People,” and carried the subtitle “On Behalf of the People.” The paper took a critical stance toward the Pelham ministry.

The periodical set out an explicit theory of parliamentary opposition, arguing that popular interposition should be exercised periodically to preserve constitutional rights. It treated liberty of the press (and the allied liberty of the stage) as fundamental, urged vigilance by “every Lover of Truth and Liberty,” and opposed a peacetime standing army in favour of a militia. The opening number posed a Hobbesian question drawn from the frontispiece to Leviathan, and the second issue diagnosed “the great disorder of the nation” as a decay of public morality. Within Bedford-Whig politics the paper also campaigned against the Jewish Naturalization Act.

Ralph sought legal assurances before publication, having seen his earlier periodical The Remembrancer silenced in 1749 after its printer was arrested. During the run Henry Pelham wrote that Ralph’s attacks “gave [him] not the least concern,” yet by early November terms were set for a Treasury pension on condition that Ralph withdraw from political writing. The final number of 10 November announced closure (“blowing on a Dead Coal … lay down the Bellows”), and thereafter payments were made at Michaelmas and Lady Day.

The title is sometimes misspelled “The Protestor” in later secondary literature; contemporary issues consistently use “The Protester”.

== History ==
=== Launch and publication ===
The Protester ran weekly from 2 June to 10 November 1753, printed for J. Bouquet in Paternoster Row. Edited by James Ralph, the essays appeared under his pseudonym “Issachar Barebone,” and the opening number called for an “intelligent and disinterested opposition.” Funding came from an opposition circle headed by the Duke of Cumberland and including MP and Jamaican planter William Beckford and the 4th Duke of Bedford. The run was numbered Nos. I–XXIV, issued as a sheet-and-a-half folio, and later reprinted in one octavo volume; it also campaigned against the Jewish Naturalization Act within Bedford-Whig politics. Holdings are recorded at Yale (CtY, nos. I–XXIV) and Indiana (IU, nos. I–XX).

=== Background and legal precautions ===
Ahead of publication, when he first contracted to write the paper, Ralph asked whether he would be “secur’d and protected against all law prosecution” and was assured he would be “thoroughly protected … by those who would own him in both Houses”. On 8 May 1753 George Bubb Dodington professed to have suggested an annual payment for Ralph to Lord Barnard; before the first issue appeared, Henry Pelham declined to pension Ralph.

Ralph’s caution had roots in 1749: on 11 May of that year, while working on The Remembrancer, he was taken into custody over a published report of a House of Commons debate and then discharged. In November 1749 the paper was silenced and its printer “taken up for his paper”, after which Ralph withdrew from London for a time under Dodington’s protection.

=== Editorial programme ===
The opening number (2 June 1753) posed a Hobbesian question, asking whether the polity resembled the frontispiece of Leviathan—“a community united under and directed by one superior intelligence”—or “a shapeless, helpless, heartless body”. In its early numbers the paper set out a theory of opposition: popular interposition should be exercised periodically to preserve constitutional rights even without immediate abuses; one issue declared that “a Spirit of Opposition has been the Guardian Spirit of our Constitution, from the first Hour of its Establishment.” It treated liberty of the press as a fundamental privilege and linked regulation of the stage to the same principle, urged vigilance by “every Lover of Truth and Liberty,” and opposed a peacetime standing army in favour of a militia.

The second issue (9 June 1753) framed “the great disorder of the nation” as “a suppression, if not an extinction, of morality and the shame of doing ill”; a later analysis situates this within a Bedfordite “authoritarian whig” emphasis on hierarchy and discipline as checks on disorder. The paper assigned primary responsibility for constitutional “usurpations” to the Parliament and, in jeremiad fashion, catalogued recurring abuses—press restraints, suspensions of habeas corpus, and the expansion of places and pensions—as signs of decay. As the year wore on it also acknowledged the difficulty of justifying active opposition when “there is no Principle to agitate Mens Minds.”

=== Escalation, negotiations, and closure ===
As the run progressed, its attacks on the ministry sharpened. By 20 July Henry Pelham wrote to the Duke of Newcastle that Ralph’s attacks “gave [him] not the least concern” and that “the less notice is taken of him the better”.

Pressure to settle the matter was renewed in July, and on 3 November the terms were set for a Treasury pension of £300 per annum with £200 down—arranged via Lord Hartington after an introduction by David Garrick—on condition that Ralph withdraw from political writing; Pelham’s objections were overruled by the Duke of Newcastle.

On 10 November the paper closed—“Convinced … that I have … been blowing on a Dead Coal … I … lay down the Bellows.” That month Ralph told the Duke of Bedford he feared prosecution, returned £150 of a £200 advance, and had “laid down [his] pen”. Subsequent payments were made at Michaelmas and Lady Day.

== Reception and influence ==
Contemporary Whig papers disparaged the series, while Bedford sympathisers welcomed its attacks on administration policy. Its rhetoric and polemical method anticipate Ralph’s later political pamphleteering.

In an early notice to Bedford, Richard Rigby praised the opening number as “an extremely good preface to a political paper,” wishing success to the “tribe of the Barebones.”

Later scholarship has situated the paper within a Bedfordite current of “authoritarian whig” thought that stressed hierarchy and discipline in response to perceived disorder.

The pseudonym “Issachar Barebone” is first attested in The Protester, where the persona links the name to Praise-God Barebone and Commonwealth-era populism. By August 1753 the name also appeared beyond the paper, for example on a satirical print credited to “Issachar Barebone junr.”

== See also ==
- Broad Bottom ministry
- Country Party (Britain)
- The Champion
- Censorship in the United Kingdom
- Militia (Great Britain)
- The Remembrancer – James Ralph's previous periodical

== Sources ==
- Burn, Jacob Henry (1865). Catalogue of a Collection of Early Newspapers and Essayists, formed by the late John Thomas Hope, Esq., and presented to the Bodleian Library (PDF). Oxford: Clarendon Press.
- Crane, R. S.; F. B. Kaye (1927). "A Census of British Newspapers and Periodicals, 1620–1800". Studies in Philology. 24 (1): 1–205. JSTOR 4171968. Archived from the original on 4 November 2015.
- Dodington, George Bubb (1784). Henry Penruddocke Wyndham (ed.). The Diary of the Late George Bubb Dodington, Baron of Melcombe Regis: From March 8, 1749, to February 6, 1761. With an Appendix, Containing Some Curious and Interesting Papers. London: E. Easton.
- Harris, Robert (1993). A Patriot Press: National Politics and the London Press in the 1740s. Oxford: Oxford University Press.
- Kenny, Robert W. (1940). "James Ralph: An Eighteenth-Century Philadelphian in Grub Street". The Pennsylvania Magazine of History and Biography. 64 (2): 218–242. JSTOR 20087279.
- Kinkel, Sarah (2013). "Disorder, Discipline, and Naval Reform in Mid-Eighteenth-Century Britain". The English Historical Review. 128 (535): 1451–1482. doi:10.1093/ehr/cet273. Archived from the original on 17 August 2024.
- McKinsey, Elizabeth R. (1973). "James Ralph: The Professional Writer Comes of Age". Proceedings of the American Philosophical Society. 117 (1): 59–78. JSTOR 985948.
- Okie, Laird (1991). Augustan Historical Writing: Historiography in England, 1688–1750. Lanham, MD: University Press of America. p. 157.
- Ralph, James (1753). The Protester: On Behalf of the People. London: J. Bouquet – via Internet Archive (Queen’s University Library copy).
- Solomons, Israel (1908). "Satirical and Political Prints on the Jews' Naturalisation Bill, 1753". Transactions of the Jewish Historical Society of England. 6: 205–233. JSTOR 29777657. Archived from the original on 25 June 2024.
- Stephens, Frederic George; Hawkins, Edward (1877). Catalogue of Prints and Drawings in the British Museum: Division I, Political and Personal Satires. Vol. III, pt. II (1751–1760). London: Trustees of the British Museum.
