= Gertrude Russell, Duchess of Bedford =

Second wife of John Russell, the 4th Duke of Bedford

Her Grace The Duchess of Bedford
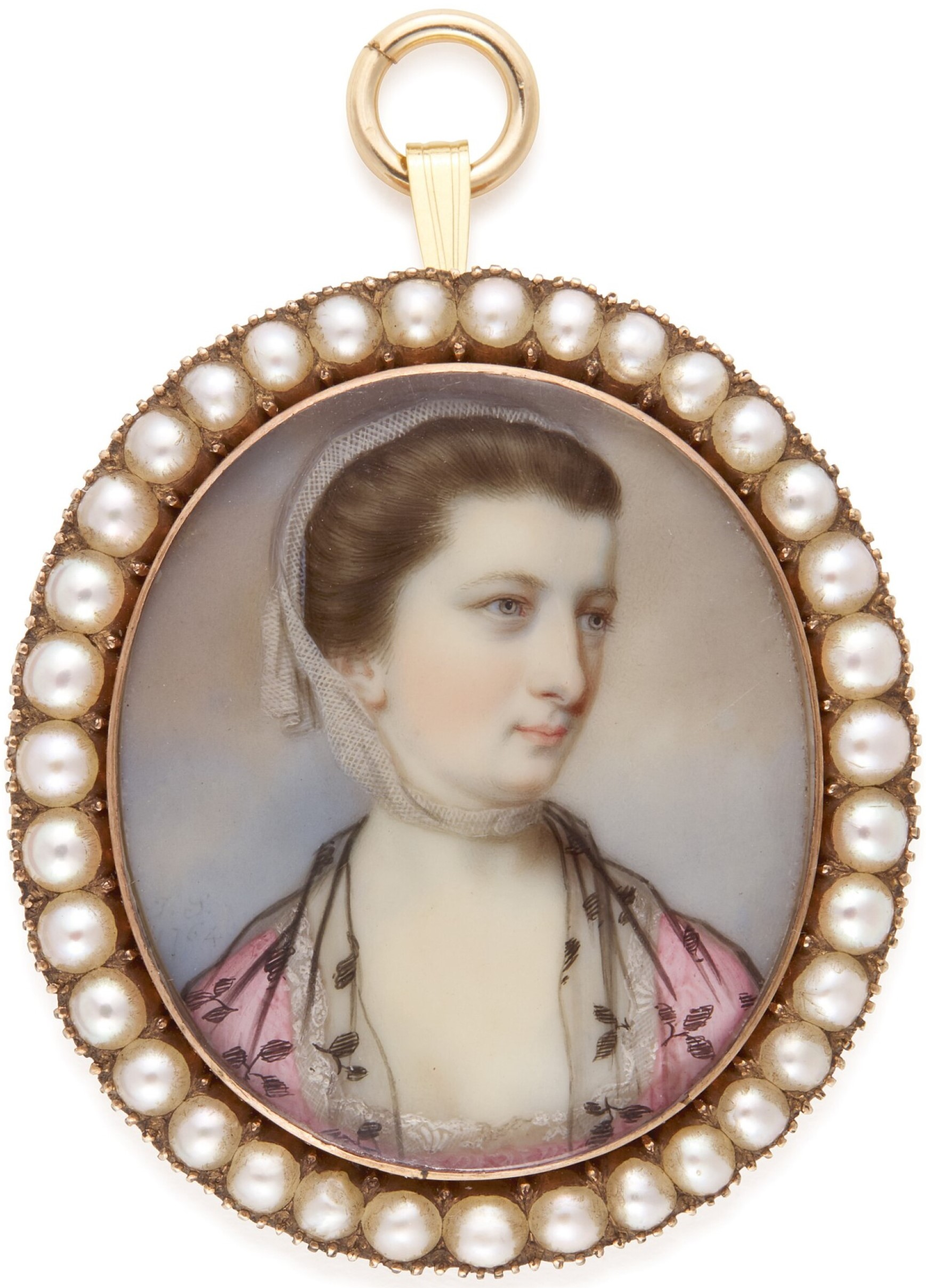
- Portrait of Gertrude, Duchess of Bedford, née Leveson-Gower (1715–1794) by John Smart
- Born: 15 February 1715
- Died: 1 June 1794 (aged 79)
- Spouse: John Russell, 4th Duke of Bedford
- Issue: Francis Russell, Marquess of Tavistock; Caroline Spencer, Duchess of Marlborough
- Father: John Leveson-Gower, 1st Earl Gower
- Mother: Lady Evelyn Pierrepont

Gertrude Russell, Duchess of Bedford (15 February 1715 – 1 July 1794), formerly the Hon. Gertrude Leveson-Gower, was the second wife of John Russell, 4th Duke of Bedford. She was the eldest daughter of John Leveson-Gower, 1st Earl Gower, and his wife, the former Lady Evelyn Pierrepont. She married the Duke of Bedford on 2 April 1737.

The earl's first wife, the former Lady Diana Spencer, had died in 1735, of tuberculosis; Diana's only child by the earl – John Russell, Marquess of Tavistock – had died in infancy. Following her marriage, Gertrude brought with her to the household at Woburn Abbey her former nurse, a Mrs Cradock, whose son Thomas became a clergyman and poet.

The duchess was described by Horace Walpole as being "stingy" and "avaricious". Nevertheless, in 1748 she held a ball that was attended by the King, George II; this was described by Henry Fielding as "a most noble entertainment". It was also said that she "understood thoroughly the value of court smiles", and in 1762 she attended the French court at Versailles in an ambassadorial role.

She was interested in art; her portrait was painted by Sir Joshua Reynolds in 1756 and is held in the collection at the family seat of Woburn Abbey. She was also painted by Thomas Hudson. She is believed to have been an amateur artist, though not a skilled one.

== Children ==
The duke and duchess had two children:

- Francis Russell, Marquess of Tavistock (1739–1767), who married Lady Elizabeth Keppel and had children, including Francis Russell, 5th Duke of Bedford, and John Russell, 6th Duke of Bedford. The Marquess of Tavistock predeceased his father, dying as a result of a fall from his horse.
- Lady Caroline Russell (1743–1811), who married George Spencer, 4th Duke of Marlborough, and had children.

== Death and legacy ==
The duchess died at the age of 79, and was buried on 7 July 1794 at Chenies, Buckinghamshire.

Gower Street, London, is named after the duchess.
