= Remembrancer (disambiguation) =

The Remembrancer is a subordinate officer of the English Exchequer.

Remembrancer may also refer to:

- City Remembrancer, one of the City of London Corporation's Chief Officers
- King's Remembrancer, an ancient judicial post in the legal system of England and Wales
- King's and Lord Treasurer's Remembrancer, an officer in Scotland who represents the Crown's interests
- Remembrancer (horse), a British Thoroughbred racehorse
- The Remembrancer, Periodical written and edited by James Ralph (1747-1751)
