= Bedfordite =

British political faction

Bedford Whigs
- Leader(s): 4th Duke of Bedford, 1st Marquess of Stafford
- Founded: 1751; 275 years ago
- Dissolved: 1783; 243 years ago
- Headquarters: Bedfordshire
- Ideology: Whiggism; Parliamentarism; Anti-war
- National affiliation: Whigs

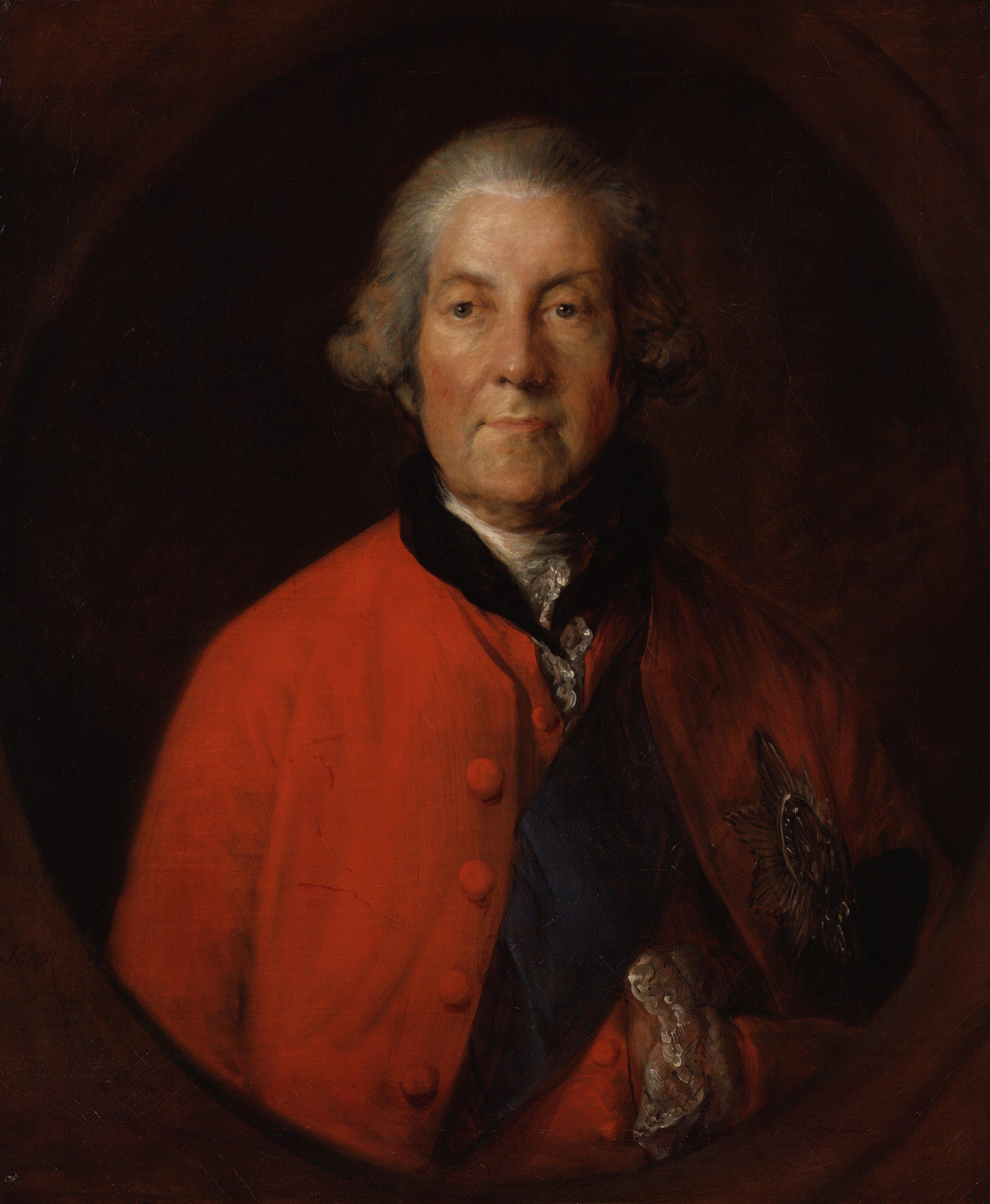
The Duke of Bedford painted by Thomas Gainsborough in c. 1770

The Bedford Whigs (or Bedfordites) were an 18th-century British political faction, led by John Russell, 4th Duke of Bedford. Other than Bedford himself, notable members included John Montagu, 4th Earl of Sandwich; Granville Leveson-Gower, 2nd Earl Gower; Richard Rigby, who served as principal Commons manager for the group; Thomas Thynne, 3rd Viscount Weymouth; Edward Thurlow; and George Spencer, 4th Duke of Marlborough. The core political-marital alliance at the head of the Bedfordite faction became known as the Bloomsbury Gang.

== History ==
The Bedfordites emerged as a specific faction in the wake of Bedford's dismissal as Secretary of State in 1751. Initially, Bedford opposed the ministry, dominated by the Old Corps Whigs led by Prime Minister Henry Pelham and his brother the Duke of Newcastle. Following Pelham's death in 1754, Bedford aligned himself with Henry Fox, and after Fox became Secretary of State in late 1755, some of Bedford's followers accepted jobs in the new administration. When the Devonshire-Pitt ministry was formed in November 1756, Bedford gave it his blessing by accepting the post of Lord Lieutenant of Ireland, and continued in that office in the Newcastle-Pitt ministry which followed.

=== Role in the Seven Years' War ===
Over the course of the Seven Years' War, however, Bedford came into considerable disagreement with Pitt on the conduct of the war. In 1760–1761, despite his doubts about the constitutionality of the influence the new king George III's favorite, the Earl of Bute, Bedford generally allied himself to Bute in Cabinet in order to advocate for peace. Bedford played a significant role in bringing about Pitt's fall, and himself served as the principal peace negotiator for Britain at the Paris Peace Conference of 1762–1763.

After Bute's resignation in April 1763, Bedford and his supporters, who now felt that accommodation with the Old Corps Whigs was the best way forward, refused to support the new government of George Grenville, but following the death of the Earl of Egremont in September 1763, he changed his mind, and Bedford and his followers obtained many of the key ministerial posts in the Grenville government – Bedford himself was Lord President, Marlborough was Lord Privy Seal, Sandwich was Secretary of State, Gower was Lord Chamberlain, and Weymouth was Master of the Horse.

The King's increasing distaste for Bedford, in particular, helped bring about the fall of the Grenville ministry in July 1765, and when a new ministry led by Lord Rockingham and dominated by the remnants of the Old Corps Whigs came to power, Bedford and his followers went into opposition. The Bedfordites supported a hard-line policy in North America, and thus opposed the Rockingham ministry's repeal of the Stamp Act in 1766. When Rockingham's ministry fell in 1766, Bedford hoped to make an alliance with the new Chatham ministry, while his lieutenant Richard Rigby wished to stay in opposition along with the Grenvillites. In the end, the King's opposition to the Bedfordites meant that they stayed out, and thus the Chatham ministry was opposed by three distinct parliamentary factions – the Grenvillites, the Rockinghamites, and the Bedfordites. Notably, the Rockinghamites opposed the ministry as pursuing too hard-line a policy on North America, while Bedford and his followers felt the opposite. Nevertheless, the two factions came close to agreeing to form a coalition, but failed to come to an agreement over who the Leader of the Commons should be.

=== American Revolution and decline ===
Nevertheless, the strength of the opposition forces convinced the Duke of Grafton, who had succeeded Chatham as effective Prime Minister, that some effort must be made to bring the Bedfords into the government. This was successfully accomplished in December 1767, when Gower became Lord President and, shortly thereafter, Weymouth was made Secretary of State. Bedford himself, who was in ill-health, did not take office, and gradually withdrew from public life until his death in 1771, but the faction survived him, now led by Gower. They continued to support a hard-line policy towards the Americas, which ultimately led to the American Revolutionary War in 1775. Gower and many of the other Bedfordites resigned from the North government in late 1779 due to what they saw as North's ineffectual leadership of the war effort, but others, including Sandwich and Thurlow, stayed on. Gower continued to lead the main body of the Bedford faction, however, which finally entered the government in December 1783 as supporters of Pitt the Younger. After this, the Bedfordites ceased to be a distinguishable political faction.

On the whole, neither contemporaries nor historians have looked on the Bedford faction with great favor – they have traditionally been seen as essentially rapacious job-seekers, willing to sell themselves to the highest bidder in exchange for positions. More recent scholarship has been less negative. In his article about Bedford for the Oxford Dictionary of National Biography, Martyn Powell contends that accusations of opportunism are unfair, and that flexibility was necessary for a relatively small party like the Bedford Whigs. Powell instead views the Bedfords as, along with the Rockingham Whigs, an early example of an organized political party, largely thanks to Rigby's management of Bedford's followers in the Commons, and noting that the Bedfords' position on North America was both consistent and strongly held.
