= Caroline Agar-Ellis, Viscountess Clifden =

Croline Agar-Ellis
- Viscountess Clifden
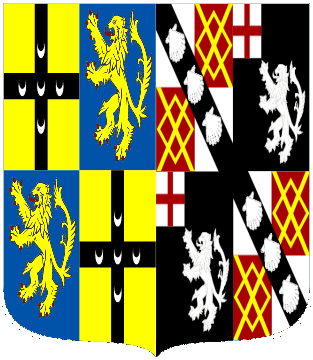
- Born: Lady Caroline Spencer; 27 October 1763
- Died: 23 November 1813 (aged 50); Blenheim Palace, Woodstock, Oxfordshire, England
- Noble family: Spencer
- Spouse: Henry Ellis, 2nd Viscount Clifden (m. 1792)
- Issue: George Agar-Ellis, 1st Baron Dover
- Father: George Spencer, 4th Duke of Marlborough
- Mother: Lady Caroline Russell

Caroline Agar-Ellis, Viscountess Clifden (27 October 1763 – 23 November 1813), formerly Lady Caroline Spencer, was an English noblewoman.

She was the eldest daughter of George Spencer, 4th Duke of Marlborough, and his wife, the former Lady Caroline Russell. In August 1782 she was due to marry George Leveson-Gower, Viscount Trentham, but the wedding was called off and instead she became engaged to George Gordon, Lord Strathavon; this engagement was also broken off.

She married Henry Agar-Ellis, 2nd Viscount Clifden (a former suitor of her sister Elizabeth), on 10 March 1792. They had one son, George Agar-Ellis (1797-1833), who later became Baron Dover. Their only daughter, Caroline Anne (1794-1814), died unmarried.

A portrait of the future Viscountess with her sister Elizabeth, painted in 1791 by George Romney, was commissioned by their father. It purports to show the sisters in the guise of the muses of Music and Painting (with Caroline representing the visual arts). The painting became known as "the Clifden Romney"; when sold in 1896, it raised the third highest price ever paid for a painting in the UK. It later came into the possession of the American businessman and collector Henry E. Huntington.

Viscountess Clifden died at Blenheim Palace, aged 50, and was buried in the family vault of the Dukes of Marlborough, next to her mother.
