= Susanna Leveson-Gower, Marchioness of Stafford =

British noblewoman (1842–1805)

The Most Honourable The Marchioness of Stafford
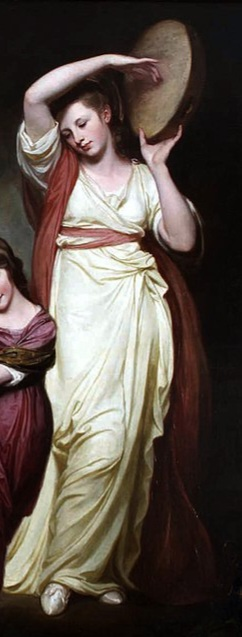
- Susanna in 1777
- Born: Lady Susan Stewart; 1742
- Died: 15 August 1805 (aged 62–63); Mayfair, Westminster, London
- Spouse: Granville Leveson-Gower, 1st Marquess of Stafford (m. 1768; died 1803)
- Issue: 4, including Granville
- Father: Alexander Stewart, 6th Earl of Galloway
- Mother: Lady Catherine Cochrane

Susanna Leveson-Gower, Marchioness of Stafford (/ˈluːsən ˈɡɔːr/ LOO-sən GOR; née Stewart; 1742 – 15 August 1805), styled Countess Gower from 1768 to 1786, was a British political hostess and aristocrat. A member of the Stewart and Leveson-Gower families, she was encouraged from a young age to pursue familial advancement through social connections and patronage.

After serving for a few years as a lady-in-waiting to Princess Augusta, in 1768 Susanna became the third wife of Granville Leveson-Gower, Earl Gower. She helped his political career and by 1788 was recognized as one of the most influential women in British politics. Well-connected, a review of her correspondence indicates that she was frequently contacted for assistance obtaining military appointments, placements, and promotions.

== Early life and family ==
Born Lady Susan Stewart, she was a younger daughter of Alexander Stewart, 6th Earl of Galloway by his second wife, Lady Catherine Cochrane, herself the youngest daughter of the 4th Earl of Dundonald. The Stewart children, whose number would grow to thirteen, were encouraged to pursue the family's advancement through social connections and patronage. Lacking a large fortune, Susanna had the necessary birth and was attractive and intelligent enough for court. Necessarily ambitious, Susanna successfully sought out friendships with prominent figures at court and in 1761 obtained an appointment as a Maid of the Bedchamber to Princess Augusta, a sister of King George III. Three years later, she accompanied the princess to Brunswick for her marriage; the pair would maintain a lifelong correspondence.

Family advancement was always her foremost focus. Susanna's letters with her father show their coordination to seek positions for her brothers and sisters' husbands, and eventually her sons and sons-in-law. For instance, she used her position to find governorships for her indebted brother-in-law, Lord Dunmore, in Colonial America and the Bahamas. A review of her correspondence also indicates that she was frequently contacted by others for assistance obtaining military appointments, placements, and promotions. The historian Elaine Chalus says that Susanna "sought patronage appointments with the eagerness that some women reserved for cards and scandal".

Lady Susanna received criticism from some contemporaries for seemingly manipulating others; Horace Walpole described her as living life as "a series of jobs and solicitations". However, Chalus notes that she was not doing anything unusual for the era and was quite talented at forging friendships, gaining the respect of both men and women in her social circles. Indeed, her role as a power broker – with connections to many prominent politicians – would be useful to many in her family and social circle.

== Marriage and issue ==
As a young woman, Susanna saw her life's role as first being the best of daughters and then once wed, as the best of wives. On 23 May 1768, she married as his third wife Granville Leveson-Gower, 1st Marquess of Stafford, then known as The Earl Gower. Susanna was twenty-five and her new husband was more than twenty years older and already had children. Despite the age difference, the marriage was happy. After her husband was awarded the title of Marquess of Stafford in 1786, she was styled Marchioness of Stafford. They had four children:

- Lady Georgiana Augusta Leveson-Gower (d. 24 March 1806), who married William Eliot, 2nd Earl of St Germans.
- Lady Charlotte Sophia Leveson-Gower (d. 12 August 1854), who married Henry Somerset, 6th Duke of Beaufort and was mother of Henry Somerset, 7th Duke of Beaufort and Lord Granville Somerset.
- Lady Susanna Leveson-Gower (d. 26 May 1838), who married Dudley Ryder, 1st Earl of Harrowby.
- Granville Leveson-Gower, 1st Earl Granville (12 October 1773 – 8 January 1846), who married Lady Harriet Cavendish.

== Political life ==
To be a successful political hostess in the 18th-century, one needed to combine the social with the political. Energetic and able to find humour in her role, Susanna attained political influence from her social interactions at court and by entertaining in her home. Their household was especially political. Her husband, a Whig, was a powerful figure who held many high offices including Lord Privy Seal and Lord President of the Council. While not ambitious or particularly adept, his amiability helped him advance and she aided his career by steadfastly nurturing his political aspirations and by making requests of politicians who stayed at their home. Part of her influence was their connection with the prime minister William Pitt the Younger; the Staffords were strong supporters and often hosted him. By 1788, Lady Stafford (as she was now known) was recognized as one of the most influential women in British politics.

Susanna was close with her children and took an active role in their education, encouraging their attempts at self-improvement. She doted on her handsome son Granville, who was both the youngest and the favourite of their large family. From an early age she regularly raised subjects of ethical and political significance with him, and encouraged him to enter politics. In one letter sent in 1789, she wrote that she wished for him "in all his Studies to equal any of the young Men and to excel [at] most of them". The family, including Granville, regularly hosted distinguished dignitaries such as William Pitt where scholarly dinnertime conversation was common.

Lady Stafford, like many of her time, was a religious person and felt public – rather than private – displays of worship was important to set a positive example for others. A woman of strict morals, she warned her son of the dangers of having relationships with married women, but failed to prevent his affair with the Countess of Bessborough; instead, she encouraged him to pursue a respectable marriage, which he did a few years after her death by marrying Lady Harriet Cavendish. She also discouraged his gambling.

In 1793 Susanna's niece, Lady Augusta Murray, scandalously married King George's younger son Prince Augustus Frederick, Duke of Sussex, an event that caused great embarrassment for Susanna, as the two women had had a close relationship and the union was not allowed due to the Royal Marriages Act of 1772. Susanna apologised to the outraged king by writing that she had no "knowledge of this lamentable affair," and withdrew her political support from Augusta's father, Lord Dunmore.

By 1794, Lord Stafford was seventy-three and ready to retire, despite Susanna's attempts to dissuade him. Her involvement in politics effectively came to an end, leaving her feeling "glum". Her final years were spent with her increasingly large family and caring for Lord Stafford as he lost his eyesight. He died on 26 October 1803 at Trentham Hall, aged 82. He left her £10,000 in his will. She died at her residence in Mayfair on 15 August 1805 and ten days later was interred at Trentham Hall, Staffordshire. Her son's two illegitimate children – Harriet and George – were given her maiden name, Stewart. A collection of her letters, mainly to her daughter Charlotte, was purchased by the University of Birmingham in 1984. Their content, which "reflect[s] the social life of women in late 18th century high society", covers a variety of topics including politics, parenting, and religion.

== Gallery ==
Portraits of Susanna and her family
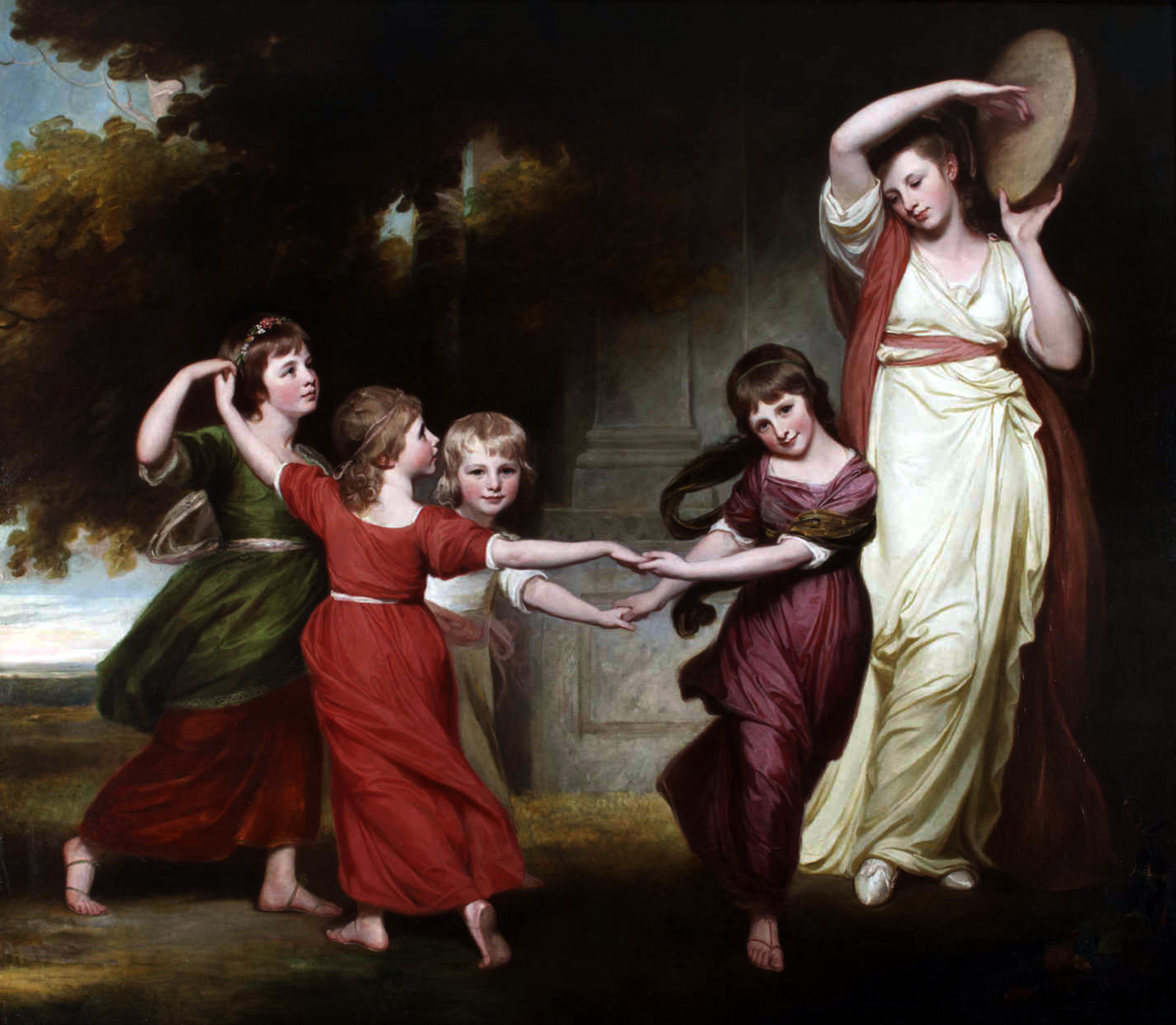
The Gower Family: The Children of Granville, 2nd Earl Gower (portrait by George Romney, c. 1776). Susanna is on the right.

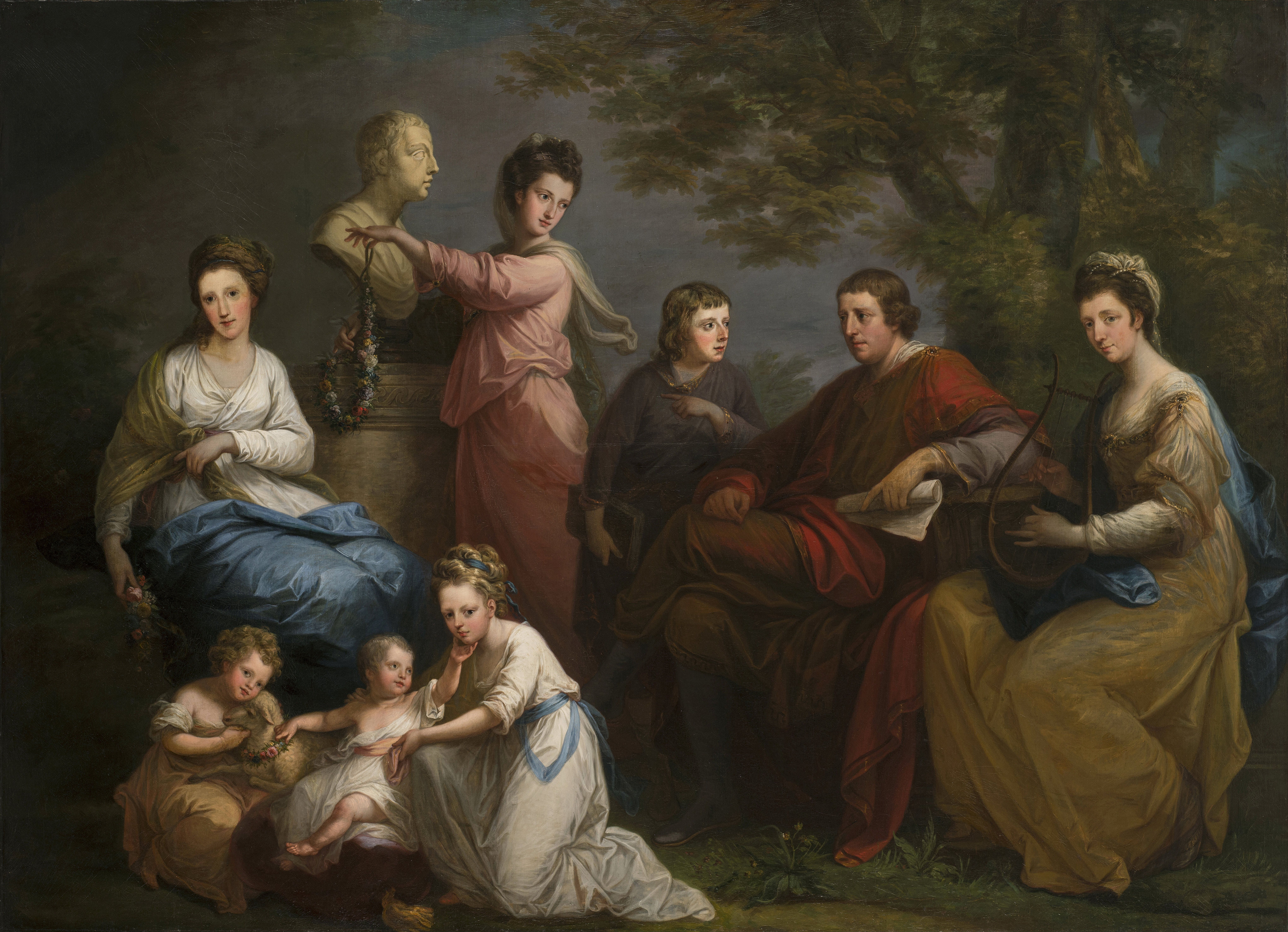
The Family of the Earl of Gower (portrait by Angelica Kauffman, 1772). Susanna is on the right.
