= John Russell, 4th Duke of Bedford =

British statesman (1710–1771)

His Grace The Duke of Bedford KG PC FRS
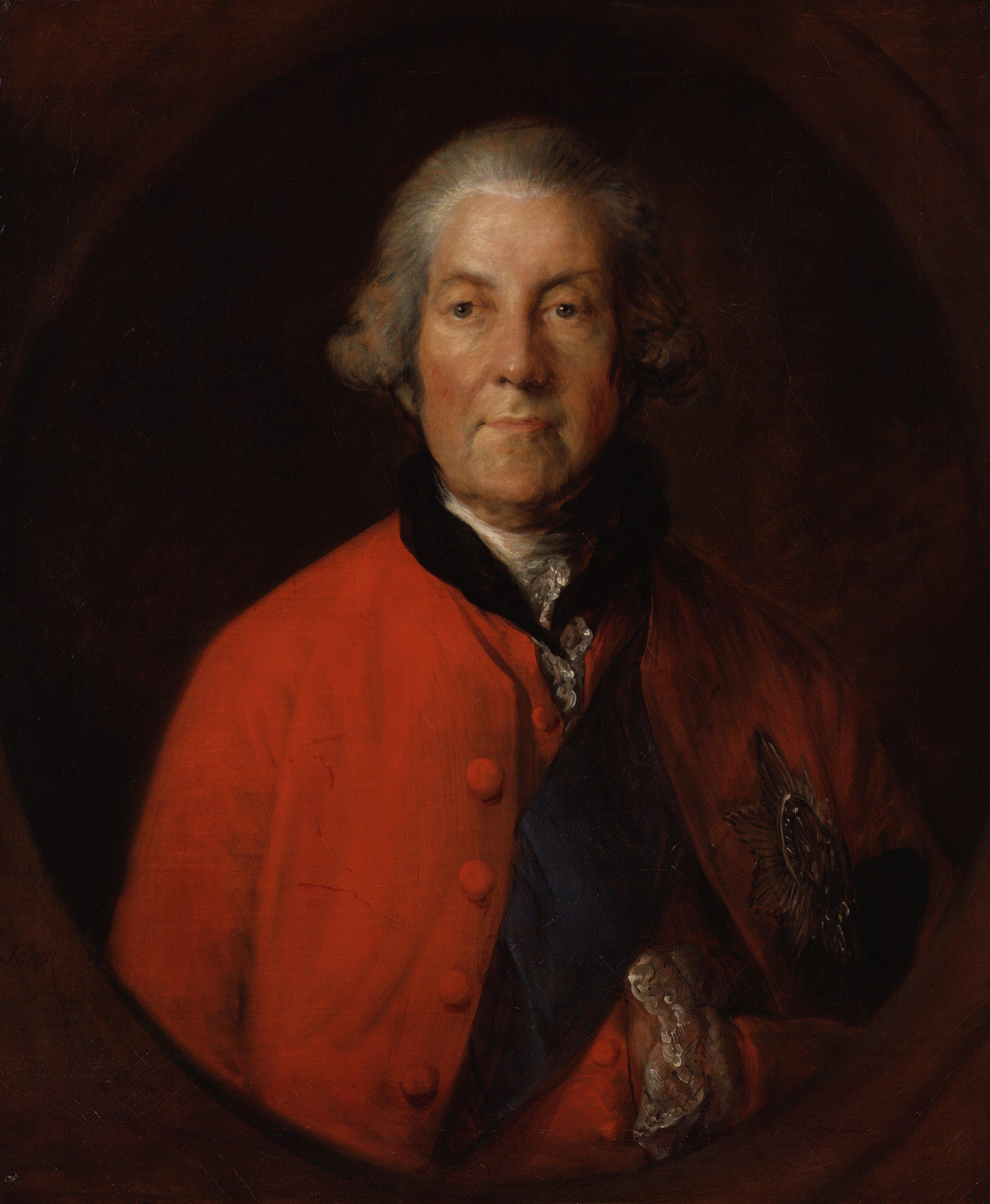
- Portrait by Thomas Gainsborough, c. 1770

Lord President of the Council
- In office 9 September 1763 – 12 July 1765
- Monarch: George III
- Prime Minister: George Grenville
- Preceded by: The Earl Granville
- Succeeded by: The Earl of Winchilsea

British Ambassador to France
- In office 4 April 1762 – 1 June 1763
- Preceded by: Vacant; The Earl of Albemarle recalled due to the Seven Years' War
- Succeeded by: The Earl of Hertford

Lord Privy Seal
- In office 25 November 1761 – 22 April 1763
- Monarch: George III
- Prime Minister: The Duke of Newcastle; The Earl of Bute; George Grenville
- Preceded by: In Commission; The Earl Temple, 5 October 1761
- Succeeded by: The Duke of Marlborough

Lord Lieutenant of Ireland
- In office 3 January 1757 – 3 April 1761
- Monarchs: George II; George III
- Preceded by: The Duke of Devonshire
- Succeeded by: The Earl of Halifax

Secretary of State for the Southern Department
- In office 12 February 1748 – 13 June 1751
- Monarch: George II
- Prime Minister: Henry Pelham
- Preceded by: The Duke of Newcastle
- Succeeded by: The Earl of Holderness

First Lord of the Admiralty
- In office 27 December 1744 – 26 February 1748
- Monarch: George II
- Prime Minister: Henry Pelham
- Preceded by: The Earl of Winchilsea
- Succeeded by: The Earl of Sandwich

Personal details
- Born: John Russell; 30 September 1710 Streatham, Surrey, England
- Died: 5 January 1771 (aged 60) Woburn, Bedfordshire, England
- Resting place: Chenies, Buckinghamshire
- Spouses: Lady Diana Spencer (m. 1731; died 1735) Lady Gertrude Leveson-Gower (m. 1737)
- Children: John Russell, Marquess of Tavistock; Francis Russell, Marquess of Tavistock; Caroline Spencer, Duchess of Marlborough
- Parent(s): Wriothesley Russell, 2nd Duke of Bedford; Elizabeth Howland

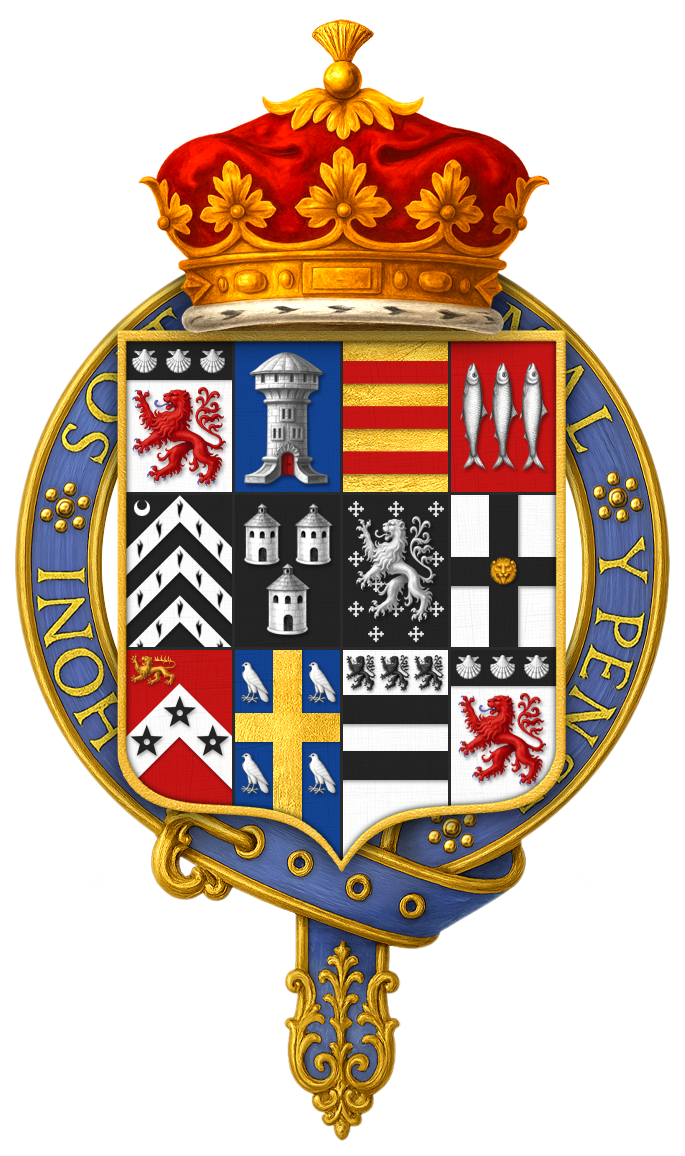
Bedford's coat of arms

John Russell, 4th Duke of Bedford (30 September 1710 – 5 January 1771) was a British Whig statesman who served as the Lord Lieutenant of Ireland from 1757 to 1761. A leading member of the Whig party during the Seven Years' War, he negotiated the 1763 Treaty of Paris which ended the conflict. Bedford was also an early promoter of cricket and a patron of the arts who commissioned numerous works from prominent artists, most notably Canaletto.

== Early life ==
He was the fourth son of Wriothesley Russell, 2nd Duke of Bedford, by his wife, Elizabeth, daughter and heiress of John Howland of Streatham, Surrey. Known as Lord John Russell, he married in October 1731 Diana Spencer, daughter of Charles Spencer, 3rd Earl of Sunderland; became Duke of Bedford on his brother's death a year later.

Having lost his first wife in 1735, he married, secondly, in April 1737, to Lady Gertrude Leveson-Gower (died 1794), daughter of John Leveson-Gower, 1st Earl Gower. In 1749, John Russell, 4th Duke of Bedford, was made a Knight of the Order of the Garter.

== Early political career ==
In the House of Lords he joined the Patriot Whig opposition hostile to the Prime Minister Sir Robert Walpole, took a fairly prominent part in public business, and earned the dislike of George II. When Carteret, now Earl Granville, resigned office in November 1744, Bedford became First Lord of the Admiralty in the administration of Henry Pelham, and was made a privy councillor. He was very successful at the admiralty, but was not equally fortunate after he became Secretary of State for the Southern Department in February 1748. Pelham accused him of idleness and he was constantly at variance with his colleague The Duke of Newcastle.

Newcastle had previously admired The Earl of Sandwich. Bedford resigned in protest, as Newcastle had calculated, allowing him to replace them with men more loyal to him personally. During his time in the post, Bedford was accused of spending far too much time at his country estate playing cricket and shooting pheasants.

In 1753 Bedford's political circle helped to finance the opposition weekly The Protester, edited by James Ralph; Richard Rigby wrote to Bedford praising the opening number as “an extremely good preface to a political paper.” In November 1753 Ralph informed Bedford that he was closing the paper, citing ill-health and fear of prosecution, and he returned £150 of a £200 advance.

== Cricket ==
Bedford was very keen on cricket. The earliest surviving record of his involvement in the sport comes from 1741 when he hosted Bedfordshire v Northamptonshire & Huntingdonshire at Woburn Park. The combined Northamptonshire & Huntingdonshire team won. Bedford arranged the match with his friends George Montagu-Dunk, 2nd Earl of Halifax (Northants) and John Montagu, 4th Earl of Sandwich (Hunts). A few days later, there was a return match at Cow Meadow, Northampton, and the combined team won again.

By 1743, Bedford had developed Woburn Cricket Club into a leading team that was able to compete against London. The team was prominent in 1743 and 1744 but, after that, there is no further mention of it.

== Seven Years' War ==
=== Lord Lieutenant of Ireland ===
Instigated by his friends, he was active in opposition to the government, becoming the leader of a faction named after him, the Bedford Whigs. After Newcastle's resignation in November 1756, Bedford became Lord Lieutenant of Ireland in the new government led by William Pitt and the Duke of Devonshire. He retained this office after Newcastle, in alliance with Pitt, returned to power in June 1757.

In Ireland, he favoured a relaxation of the penal laws against Roman Catholics, but did not keep his promises to observe neutrality between the rival parties, and to abstain from securing pensions for his friends. His own courtly manners and generosity, and his wife's good qualities, however, seem to have gained for him some popularity, although Horace Walpole says he disgusted everybody (but the word "disgusting" then had a much wider range of meanings than it has today, and at its mildest meant simply "reserved").

He oversaw the Irish response to the threatened French invasion in 1759, and the landing of a small French force in northern Ireland. In March 1761, he resigned from this office.

=== Peace negotiator ===
Having allied himself with the Earl of Bute and the party anxious to bring the Seven Years' War to a close, Bedford was noticed as the strongest opponent of Pitt, and became Lord Privy Seal under Bute after Pitt resigned in October 1761. The cabinet of Bute was divided over the policy to be pursued with regard to the war, but the peace faction prevailed, and, in September 1762, Bedford went to France to open formal negotiations for peace.

He was considerably annoyed because some of the peace negotiations were conducted through other channels, but he signed the Peace of Paris in February 1763. Amongst other gains Britain received Canada from France and Florida from Spain. Resigning his office as Lord Privy Seal soon afterwards, various causes of estrangement arose between Bute and Bedford, and the subsequent relations between the two men were somewhat virulent.

== Grenville ministry ==
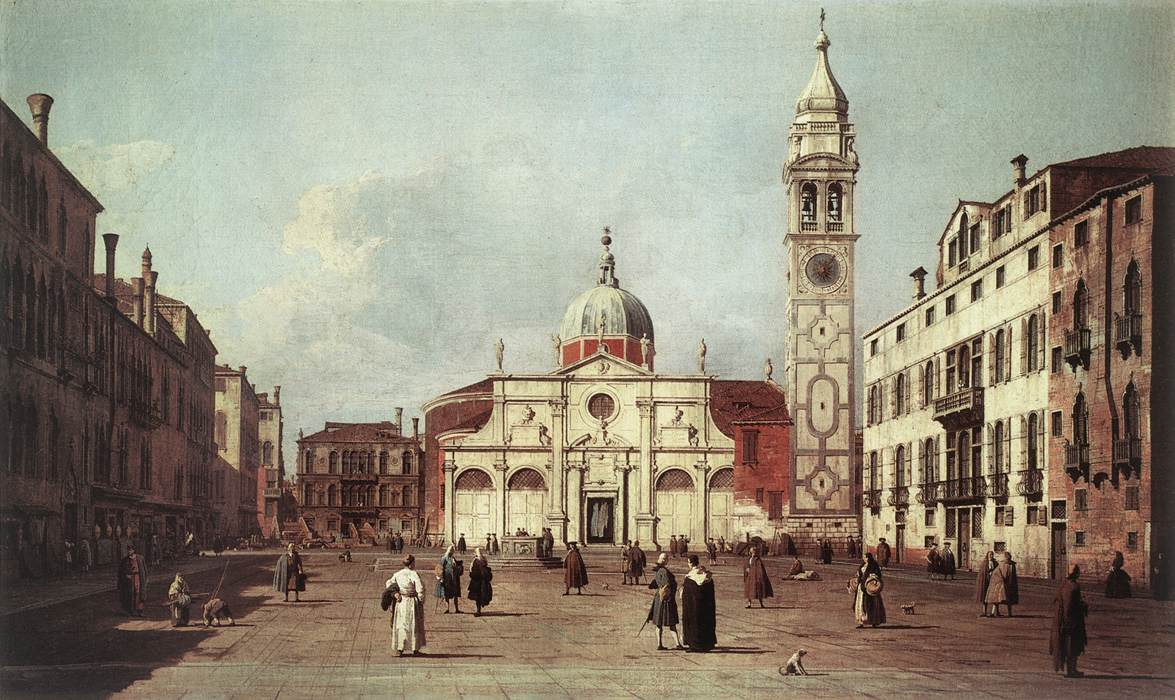
Bedford was a patron of Canaletto and commissioned a number of works from him, including this view of Venice.

The duke refused to take office under George Grenville on Bute's resignation in April 1763, and sought to induce Pitt to return to power. A report, however, that Pitt would only take office on condition that Bedford was excluded, incensed him and, smarting under this rebuff, he joined the cabinet of Grenville as Lord President of the Council in September 1763. His haughty manner, his somewhat insulting language, and his attitude with regard to the regency bill in 1765 offended George III, who sought in vain to supplant him, and after this failure was obliged to make humiliating concessions to the ministry. In July 1765, however, he was able to dispense with the services of Bedford and his colleagues, and the duke became the leader of a political party, distinguished for rapacity, and known as the Bedfordites or Bedford party, and the leadership of which was called the Bloomsbury Gang.

During his term of office, he had opposed a bill to place high import duties on Italian silks. He was consequently assaulted and his London residence was attacked by a mob. He took some part in subsequent political intrigues, and although he did not return to office, his friends, with his consent, joined the ministry of the Duke of Grafton in December 1767. This proceeding led "Junius" to write his "Letter to the Duke of Bedford," one of special violence. Bedford was hostile to John Wilkes, and narrowly escaped from a mob favourable to the agitator at Honiton in July 1769.

== Children ==
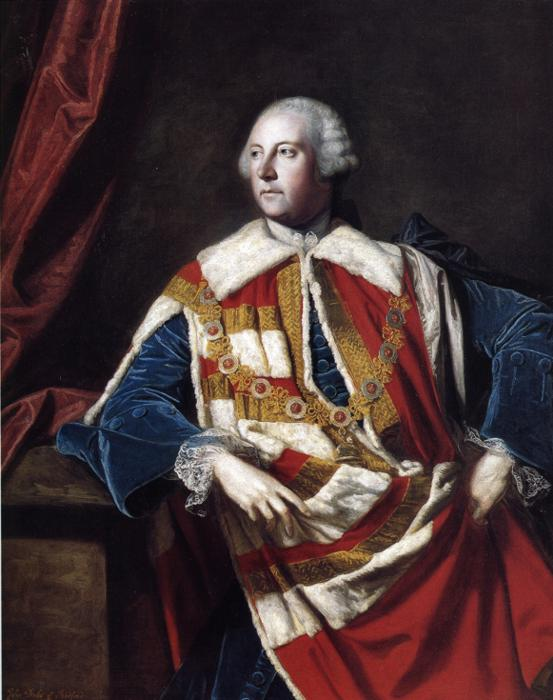
1759–1762 portrait Bedford by Sir Joshua Reynolds

Child of John Russell and his first wife Lady Diana Spencer:

- John Russell, Marquess of Tavistock (died at birth 6 November 1732)

Children of John Russell and his second wife Hon. Gertrude Leveson-Gower:

- Francis Russell, Marquess of Tavistock (27 September 1739 – 22 March 1767)
- Lady Caroline Russell (c. January 1743 – 26 November 1811), married George Spencer, 4th Duke of Marlborough

== Death ==
His health had been declining for some years, and in 1770 he became partially paralysed. He died at Woburn on 5 January 1771, and was buried in the Bedford Chapel at St. Michael's Church, Chenies, Buckinghamshire. His sons all predeceased him, and he was succeeded in the title by his grandson, Francis. Francis suffered heavy financial losses, and began the development of Bloomsbury on the old Bedford Estate.

The duke held many public offices: lord-lieutenant of Bedfordshire and Devon, Colonel of the East Devon Militia, and chancellor of the University of Dublin among others, and was a Knight of the Garter. Bedford was a proud and conceited man, but possessed both ability and common sense. The important part which he took in public life, however, was due rather to his wealth and position than to his personal taste or ambition. He was neither above nor below the standard of political morality of the time, and was influenced by his duchess, who was very ambitious, and by followers who were singularly unscrupulous.

He served as the twelfth Chancellor of the University of Dublin from 1765 to 1770.

== See also ==
- Elizabeth Wrottesley (niece)

== Bibliography ==
- Brown, Peter Douglas. William Pitt, Earl of Chatham: The Great Commoner. George Allen & Unwin, 1978.
- Maun, Ian (2009). From Commons to Lord's, Volume One: 1700 to 1750. Roger Heavens. ISBN 978-1-900592-52-9.
- Waghorn, H. T. (1899). Cricket Scores, Notes, etc. (1730–1773). Blackwood.

Honorary titles
| New office | President of the Foundling Hospital; 1739–1771 | Succeeded by Lord North |
| Vacant Title last held by The Duke of Kent | Lord Lieutenant of Bedfordshire; 1745–1771 | Succeeded by The Earl of Upper Ossory |
| Preceded by The Earl of Orford | Lord Lieutenant of Devon; 1751–1771 | Succeeded by The Earl Poulett |
| Vacant Title last held by Theophilus Fortescue | Vice-Admiral of Devon; 1761–1771 | Vacant Title next held by The Earl Fortescue |
Political offices
| Preceded by The Earl of Winchilsea and Nottingham | First Lord of the Admiralty; 1744–1748 | Succeeded by The Earl of Sandwich |
| Preceded by The Duke of Newcastle | Secretary of State for the Southern Department; 1748–1751 | Succeeded by The Earl of Holdernesse |
| Preceded by The Duke of Devonshire | Lord Lieutenant of Ireland; 1757–1761 | Succeeded by The Earl of Halifax |
| Preceded by The Earl Temple | Lord Privy Seal; 1761–1763 | Succeeded by The Duke of Marlborough |
| Preceded by The Earl Granville | Lord President of the Council; 1763–1765 | Succeeded by The Earl of Winchilsea and Nottingham |
Diplomatic posts
| Vacant None due to Seven Years' War Title last held by The Earl of Albemarle | British Ambassador to France; 1762–1763 | Succeeded by The Earl of Hertford |
Academic offices
| Preceded by The Duke of Cumberland | Chancellor of the University of Dublin; 1765–1771 | Succeeded by The Duke of Gloucester and Edinburgh |
Peerage of England
| Preceded by Wriothesley Russell | Duke of Bedford; 1732–1771 | Succeeded by Francis Russell |
