= A. S. Turberville =

British historian

Arthur Stanley Turberville, MC (1888–1945) was a British historian who was Professor of Modern History at the University of Leeds.

== Biography ==
Turberville was educated at Oxford University and then taught at the universities of Liverpool, Wales and Manchester.

His academic career was interrupted by service in the King's Royal Rifle Corps during the First World War, where he won a Military Cross (MC).

Turberville was appointed Reader in Modern History at the University of Leeds in 1927 and promoted to Professor of Modern History, also at Leeds, in 1929 where he remained until his death in 1945. In 1939 he was appointed head of the history department at Leeds.

From 1942 until his death he was president of the Historical Association. During the Second World War Turberville lectured extensively to troops and he was also president of the Thoresby Society.

Turberville's historical works focused on eighteenth century British history, such as English Men and Manners in the Eighteenth Century (1926) and The House of Lords in the XVIIIth Century (1927). After his death, David C. Douglas paid tribute to Turberville:

His prose, happily modelled upon the great masters of the century he made his own, was notable; and he used it as the medium whereby the history which he studied as an expert might be shared as widely as possible. The same qualities marked his relations with his fellows. Uncompromising in his principles, he had a talent for friendship: rigid in the integrity of his scholarship, he had a zeal for public service. He was but fifty-seven when he died, and the world of English historical scholarship is made the poorer by his passing.

== Works ==
- The House of Lords in the Reign of William III (Oxford: Clarendon Press, 1913).
- Medieval Heresy & the Inquisition (Oxford: London Crosby Lockwood, 1920)
- English Men and Manners in the Eighteenth Century (Oxford: Clarendon Press, 1926).
- The House of Lords in the XVIIIth Century (Oxford: Clarendon Press, 1927).
- Commonwealth and Restoration (London: Nelson, 1928).
- The Spanish Inquisition (London: Oxford University Press, 1932).
- (editor), Johnson's England, two volumes (Oxford: Clarendon Press, 1933).
- History of Welbeck Abbey and its Owners, two volumes (1938–1939).
- Leeds and Parliamentary Reform 1820–1832 (Leeds: Thoresby Society, 1943).
- John Bright (Swindon: Swindon Press, 1945).
- The House of Lords in the Age of Reform, 1784–1837: With An Epilogue on Aristocracy and the Advent of Democracy, 1837–1867, ed. Reginald James White (London: Faber and Faber, 1958).
