= Lord Henry Spencer =

British diplomat and politician

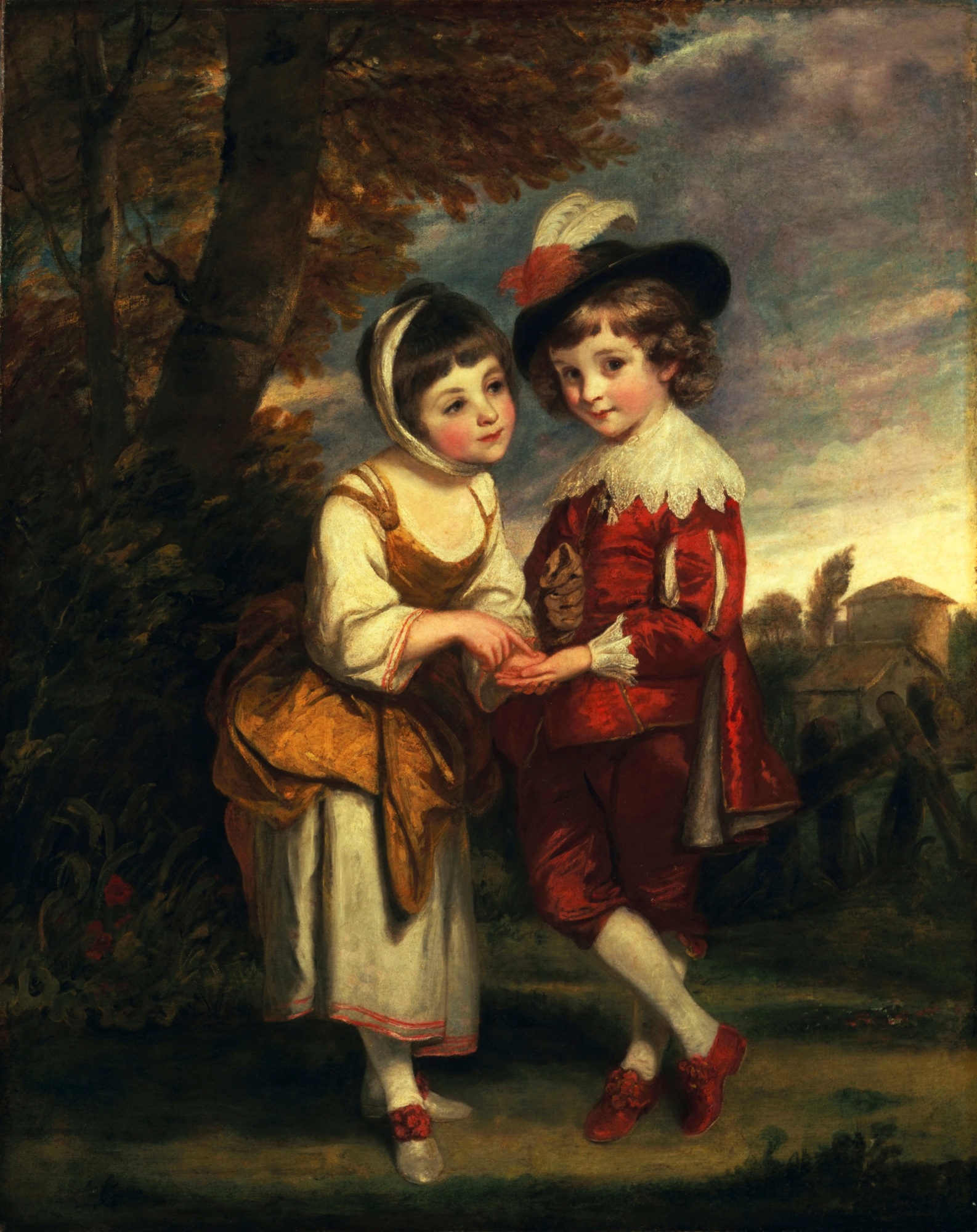
Children of George Spencer, 4th Duke of Marlborough

Lord Henry John Spencer (20 December 1770 – 3 July 1795) was a British diplomat and politician.

Spencer was the second son of George Spencer, 4th Duke of Marlborough and his wife, Caroline and was educated at Eton College and Christ Church, Oxford. In 1790, he was elected Member of Parliament for Woodstock and was briefly secretary to Lord Auckland, British Ambassador at The Hague that year. From 1790 to 1793, he was himself ambassador until transferring to Sweden in 1793. In 1795, he was transferred to Prussia but died of fever at Berlin on 3 July, aged twenty-four.

Parliament of Great Britain
Preceded by Sir Henry Dashwood, Bt and Francis Burton	Member of Parliament for Woodstock; 1790–1795; With: Sir Henry Dashwood, Bt	Succeeded by Sir Henry Dashwood, Bt and The Lord Lavinton
Diplomatic posts
Preceded by The Lord Auckland	British Minister to the Netherlands; 1790–1793	Succeeded by Hon. William Eliot
Preceded by Robert Liston	British Minister to Sweden; 1793–1795	Succeeded by Daniel Hailes
Preceded by The Lord Malmesbury	British Minister to Prussia; 1795	Succeeded by The Earl of Elgin and Kincardine
