= The Remembrancer (1747 periodical) =

18th century English political journal

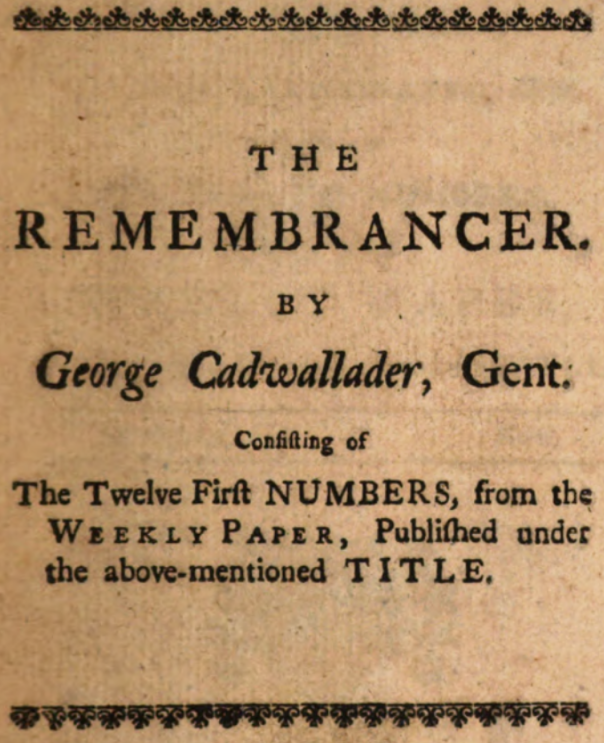
- Editor: James Ralph
- Categories: Politics
- Frequency: Weekly
- Publisher: W. Owen
- First issue: 12 December 1747
- Final issue: 1 June 1751
- Country: Kingdom of Great Britain
- Based in: London
- Language: English

The Remembrancer was a London weekly political periodical published from 12 December 1747 to 1 June 1751. Edited by James Ralph—who wrote under the byline “By George Cadwallader, gent.”—it was launched under Leicester House patronage as George Bubb Dodington moved into the opposition around Frederick, Prince of Wales. The paper took an oppositional line toward the Pelham ministry, arguing for a blue-water strategy in the closing stages of the War of the Austrian Succession and, in 1749, mounting a prominent critique of the Navy Bill’s extension of military discipline in peacetime.

Contemporaries noticed its bite: Horace Walpole called it “the Craftsman of the present age,” aimed at the Duke of Cumberland, and credited it with having “written down” General Henry Hawley. The editor was briefly detained after publishing a report of a Commons debate (11 May 1749), and in November 1749 the paper was suppressed, though publication resumed and the final five issues appeared under the retitled masthead The Remembrancer, or, National advocate, concluding on 1 June 1751. After a hiatus, Ralph returned to opposition journalism with The Protester (June–November 1753).

== Publication ==
The periodical was published weekly in London. Issues read “printed for W. Owen,” identifying the bookseller-publisher William Owen; no printer is named. It appeared under the pseudonymous byline “By George Cadwallader, gent.”.

In December 1747 George Bubb Dodington arranged for James Ralph to edit the paper as he moved toward the Prince of Wales’s opposition, launching it as a Leicester House–sponsored essay paper. Ralph was said to forgo the security of a government pension to take the editorship.

In early 1748 the paper reported details of parliamentary debate—citing Henry Pelham’s warning about the war’s fiscal burdens and related speeches by two of his lieutenants—not otherwise printed elsewhere, indicating close connections to Leicester House sources.

Surviving catalogues attest a continuous run from 12 December 1747 to 1 June 1751, with the final five issues (nos. 178–182; 27 April–1 June 1751) appearing under the retitled masthead The Remembrancer, or, National advocate.

== Editorial stance ==
The paper took an opposition line toward the Pelham ministry. Horace Walpole later observed that it was “more than once emboldened” by contributions from the Earl of Egmont and others.

=== Foreign policy and war aims ===
The paper argued for a “blue-water” strategy that confined Britain’s role in the conflict to maritime operations; within this line, criticism of allied shortcomings was comparatively muted (1747–1748). In January 1748 it maintained that “the war ought to be condemned and yet now ought to be prosecuted” (9 January), pressed the strategic importance of preserving the Dutch Republic (“Holland”) as Britain’s barrier, and urged abandoning continental campaigns in favour of naval action (16 January).

It warned that wartime fiscal burdens were pushing Britain toward bankruptcy—invoking Charles Davenant’s £6 million “annual supply” threshold and noting that the 1747 supply exceeded £13 million—while lamenting public indifference (29 January 1748). As a remedy, it contended that Britain should continue the war to seize French trade and colonies, thereby acquiring means to discharge the principal of the national debt (1748). The paper further alleged that Henry Pelham’s opposition to prolonging the war led him not to shore up public credit by using his supposed influence over the Bank of England (2 April 1748).

It criticized the ministry’s independent conclusion of the peace preliminaries and compared this to the supposed betrayal of allies under the Treaty of Utrecht (25 June 1748), and it argued that the Dunkirk clause of the peace showed ministerial indifference to national interests, recalling that Utrecht had required Dunkirk’s total demolition and that Whig critics had once “clamoured” for its enforcement (31 December 1748). Early in 1749 it also noted the question of Hanover’s relation to Britain’s interests in the peace debate (7 January 1749).

=== Domestic politics and rhetoric ===
Early issues registered popular disillusionment with “patriot” politics after earlier betrayals, warning that “abuse of confidence has broke all the connections … necessary for our preservation” (26 December 1747).

In shaping its arguments the paper drew on the country writer Charles Davenant—“the oracle of this country” (23 January 1748)—and urged “a general confederacy of all parties and Factions … to rescue the constitution out of [the ministry’s] Hands” (21 May 1748). Later that year it proposed a threefold division of contemporary politics (ministerial; Jacobite; and those equally apprehensive of ruin from either) and cautioned readers not to be “bugbear’d … out of their senses … by the shameless Endeavours … to resolve all opposition into Jacobitism” (8 October 1748).

=== Civil–military law and the Navy Bill ===
In the 1749 Navy Bill debates the paper argued that extending wartime discipline to the sea service and to half-pay officers in peacetime would “convert two orders of subjects into slaves” (25 February 1749).

It went on to warn that the bill sought to “establish a military system … with the sanction of law” and that professionalisation aimed “to separate the half-pay officers from the body of the people,” invoking as a cautionary precedent a 1746 dispute in which the Admiralty resisted civil-court oversight of courts-martial (8 April 1749).

== Reception and suppression ==
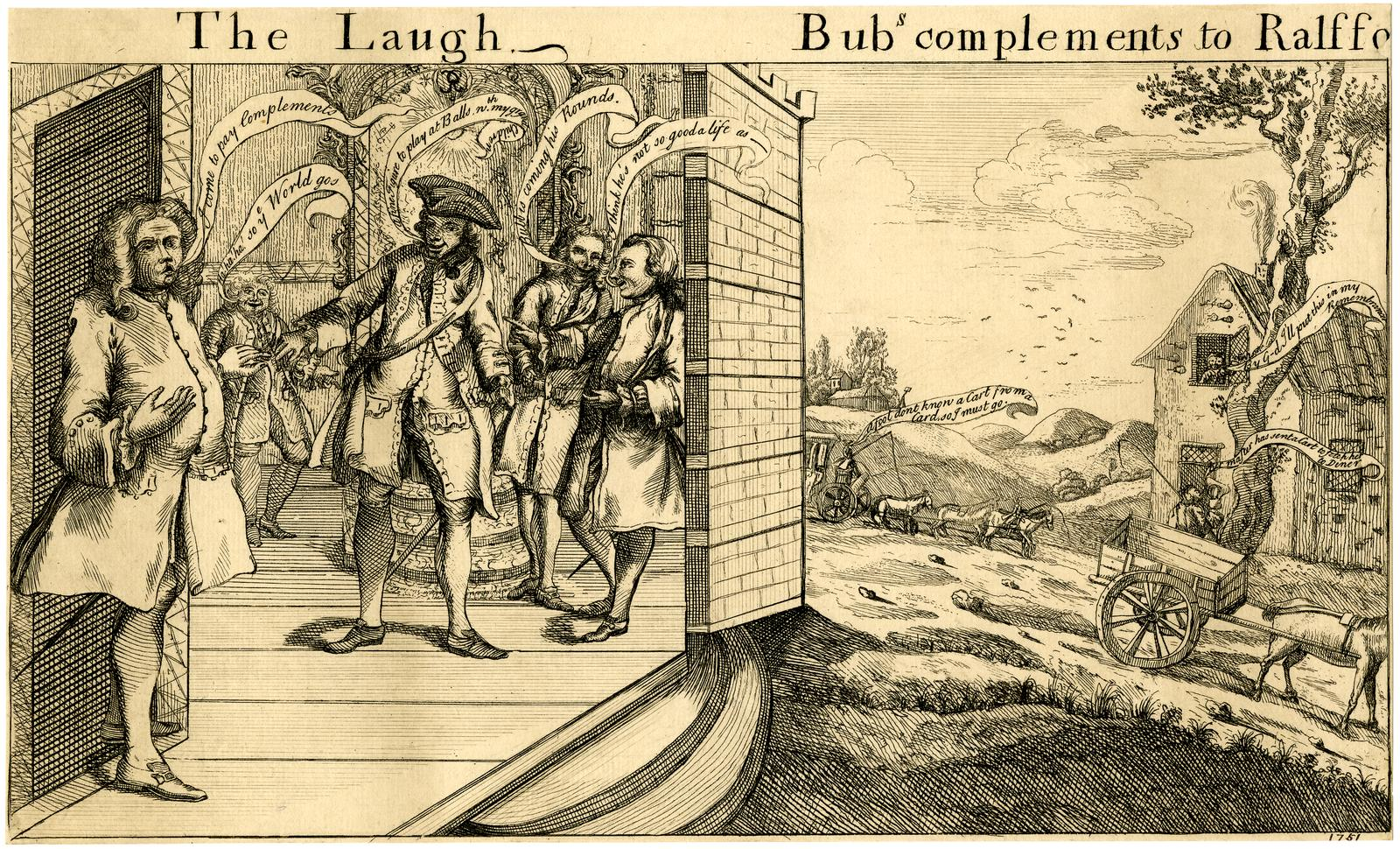
Contemporary satire linking George Bubb Dodington and James Ralph to The Remembrancer (c. 1751).See also the British Museum record (reg. no. 1868,0808.3923).

Contemporaries characterized The Remembrancer as sharply critical of the ministry; Horace Walpole called it “the Craftsman of the present age,” generally aimed at the Duke of Cumberland, and said it had “written down” General Henry Hawley.

On 11 May 1749, following publication of a report of a Commons debate, the authorities detained the editor James Ralph and later released him without charge.

In November 1749 the ministry suppressed the paper, and its printer was “taken up for his paper”; Ralph then withdrew for a time to Dodington’s villa until calls for prosecution subsided.

Relatedly, the paper’s publisher/bookseller, William Owen, was tried for seditious libel and acquitted at Guildhall on 6 July 1752 (R v Owen), the prosecution concerning his publication of the pamphlet The Case of Alexander Murray, Esq. (1751), not The Remembrancer.

== Aftermath ==
Following the death of Frederick, Prince of Wales, in March 1751, the run wound down and continued briefly under the retitled masthead The Remembrancer, or, National advocate—five issues (nos. 178–182) appeared through 1 June 1751.

After a hiatus, Ralph returned to opposition journalism with The Protester, a weekly that ran from 2 June to 10 November 1753.

== See also ==
- The Craftsman – influential opposition paper (1726–1752)
- London Evening Post – tri-weekly paper often critical of ministers
- Old England – James Ralph's previous periodical
- The Protester – James Ralph's next periodical
- Patriot Whigs
- Country party
- Freedom of the press in the United Kingdom

== Sources ==
- Burn, Jacob Henry (1865). Catalogue of a Collection of Early Newspapers and Essayists, formed by the late John Thomas Hope, Esq., and presented to the Bodleian Library (PDF). Oxford: Clarendon Press.
- Crane, R. S.; F. B. Kaye (1927). "A Census of British Newspapers and Periodicals, 1620–1800". Studies in Philology. 24 (1): 1–205. JSTOR 4171968.
- Dodington, George Bubb (1784). Henry Penruddocke Wyndham (ed.). The Diary of the Late George Bubb Dodington, Baron of Melcombe Regis: From March 8, 1749, to February 6, 1761. With an Appendix, Containing Some Curious and Interesting Papers. London: E. Easton. p. 79.
- "The Remembrancer. By George Cadwallader, gent". Grub Street Project.
- "The Remembrancer: or, National advocate". Grub Street Project.
- "William Owen". Grub Street Project.
- Harris, Robert (1993). A Patriot Press: National Politics and the London Press in the 1740s. Oxford: Oxford University Press.
- Thomas Bayly Howell, ed. (1813). A Complete Collection of State Trials and Proceedings for High Treason and Other Crimes and Misdemeanors. Vol. 18. London: T. C. Hansard. pp. 1203–1230.
- Kenny, Robert W. (1940). "James Ralph: An Eighteenth-Century Philadelphian in Grub Street". The Pennsylvania Magazine of History and Biography. 64 (2): 218–242. JSTOR 20087279.
- Kinkel, Sarah (2013). "Disorder, Discipline, and Naval Reform in Mid-Eighteenth-Century Britain". The English Historical Review. 128 (535): 1451–1482.
- "The Remembrancer". Library of Congress Catalog. Library of Congress.
- Mari, William Thomas (2015). "Writer by Trade: James Ralph's Claims to Authorship". Authorship. 4 (2). doi:10.21825/aj.v4i2.1439.
- McKinsey, Elizabeth R. (1973). "James Ralph: The Professional Writer Comes of Age". Proceedings of the American Philosophical Society. 117 (1): 59–78. JSTOR 985948.
- "The Remembrancer (Eighteenth Century Journals collection)". McMaster University Libraries – Finding aid.
- Okie, Laird (1991). Augustan Historical Writing: Historiography in England, 1688–1750. Lanham, MD: University Press of America. p. 157.
- Otis, Alexander (2022). "Guilty of Publishing Only: Jury Nullification as a Legal Defense in the Eighteenth Century". Journal of Interdisciplinary History. 53 (2): 267–296.
