= Edward Nares =

English historian (1762-1841)

- Born: 26 March 1762; London, England
- Died: 23 July 1841 (aged 79); Biddenden, Kent, England
- Resting place: Biddenden parish church
- Education: Westminster School
- Alma mater: Christ Church, Oxford
- Occupations: Historian and theologian
- Title: Regius Professor of Modern History
- Term: 1813–1841
- Predecessor: Henry Beeke
- Successor: Thomas Arnold
- Spouse: Lady Charlotte Spencer

Edward Nares (26 March 1762 – 23 July 1841) was an English historian and theologian, and general writer.

== Life ==
He was educated at Westminster School and Christ Church, Oxford. He was Fellow of Merton College, Oxford and in 1813, he became Regius Professor of Modern History. He was curate of St Peter-in-the-East, Oxford, and then rector of Biddenden from 1798, of New Church, Romney from 1827.

He was Bampton Lecturer in 1805. Orthodox on the Biblical account, he was speculative on the issue of the plurality of worlds; he wrote an 1803 pamphlet on the topic.

He wrote for the Anti-Jacobin. His novel Think's-I-to-Myself. A serio-ludicro, tragico-comico tale, written by Think's-I-to-Myself Who? (1811) caused a stir when it appeared and ran into eight editions by 1812.

== Family ==
His father was Sir George Nares. He married Lady Charlotte Spencer, daughter of George Spencer, 4th Duke of Marlborough (an elopement).

== Works ==
- Sermons Composed for Country Congregations (1803)
- View of the Evidences of Christianity at the End of the Pretended Age of Reason (1805 Bampton Lectures)
- Thinks I to Myself (1811)
- I Says, Says I; A Novel By Thinks-I-To-Myself (1812)
- Remarks on the Version of the New Testament Edited by the Unitarians
- Heraldic Anomalies; or, rank confusion in our orders of precedence. With disquisitions, moral, philosophical, and historical, on all the existing orders of society. By it matters not Who (1823)
- Elements of General History Ancient and Modern (1825)
- Memoirs of the Life and Administration of the Right Honourable William Cecil, Lord Burghley (1828) three volumes
- Man, as known to us theologically and geologically (1834)
- The History of the Reformation of the Church of England by Gilbert Burnet, 1849 revision
