= George Spencer, 4th Duke of Marlborough =

British courtier and politician (1739–1817)

His Grace The Duke of Marlborough KG PC FRS
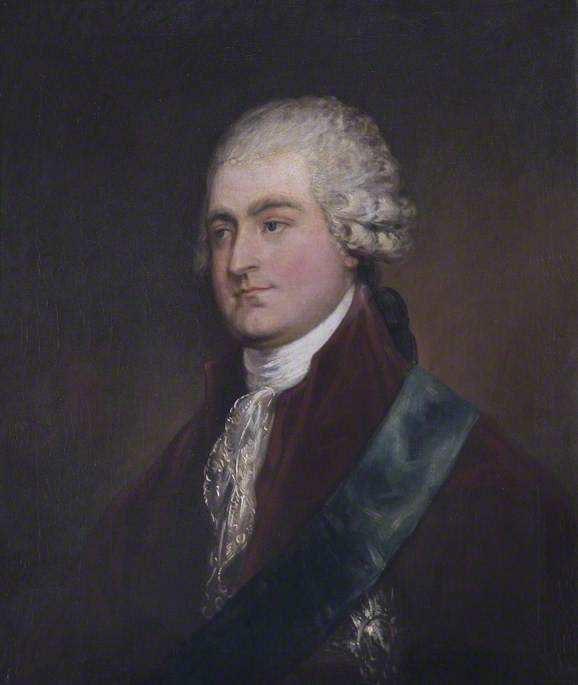
- Portrait attributed to Sir Joshua Reynolds, 1768

Lord Privy Seal
- In office 1763–1765
- Monarch: George III
- Prime Minister: George Grenville
- Preceded by: The Duke of Bedford
- Succeeded by: The Duke of Newcastle

Lord Chamberlain
- In office 1762–1763
- Monarch: George III
- Prime Minister: The Earl of Bute
- Preceded by: The Duke of Devonshire
- Succeeded by: The Earl Gower

Personal details
- Born: 26 January 1739
- Died: 29 January 1817 (aged 78) Blenheim Palace, Woodstock, Oxfordshire; United Kingdom
- Spouse: Lady Caroline Russell
- Children: Caroline Ellis, Viscountess Clifden; Lady Elizabeth Spencer; George Spencer-Churchill, 5th Duke of Marlborough; Lady Charlotte Nares; Lord Henry John Spencer; Anne Ashley-Cooper, Countess of Shaftesbury; Lady Amelia Pytches Boyce; Francis Spencer, 1st Baron Churchill
- Parents: Charles Spencer, 3rd Duke of Marlborough; Hon. Elizabeth Trevor

Military service
- Allegiance: Great Britain
- Branch/service: British Army
- Years of service: 1755–1760
- Rank: Captain
- Unit: 2nd Regiment of Foot Guards; 20th Regiment of Foot

George Spencer, 4th Duke of Marlborough, KG, PC, FRS (26 January 1739 – 29 January 1817), styled Marquess of Blandford until 1758, was a British courtier and politician from the Spencer family. He served as Lord Chamberlain between 1762 and 1763 and as Lord Privy Seal between 1763 and 1765. He is the great-great-great grandfather of Sir Winston Churchill.

== Background and education ==
Styled by the courtesy title Marquess of Blandford from birth, he was the eldest son of Charles Spencer, 3rd Duke of Marlborough, and the Honourable Elizabeth Trevor, daughter of Thomas Trevor, 2nd Baron Trevor. His siblings were Charles, Diana and Elizabeth.

== Personal traits and characteristics ==
According to George III, who mentioned it to Fanny Burney, the Duke suffered from severe red-green colourblindness. As he was unable to tell scarlet from green, Fanny, therefore, remarked that this was unlucky for someone in possession of so sumptuous a home as Blenheim Palace.

== Career ==
Marlborough entered the Coldstream Guards in 1755 as an ensign, becoming a captain with the 20th Regiment of Foot the following year. After inheriting the dukedom in 1758, Marlborough took his seat in the House of Lords in 1760, becoming Lord-Lieutenant of Oxfordshire in that same year. The following year, he bore the sceptre with the cross at the coronation of George III. In 1762, he was made Lord Chamberlain as well as a Privy Counsellor, and after a year, resigned from this appointment to become Lord Privy Seal, a post he held until 1765. An amateur astronomer, he built a private observatory at his residence, Blenheim Palace. He kept up a lively scientific correspondence with Hans Count von Brühl, another non-academic astronomer.

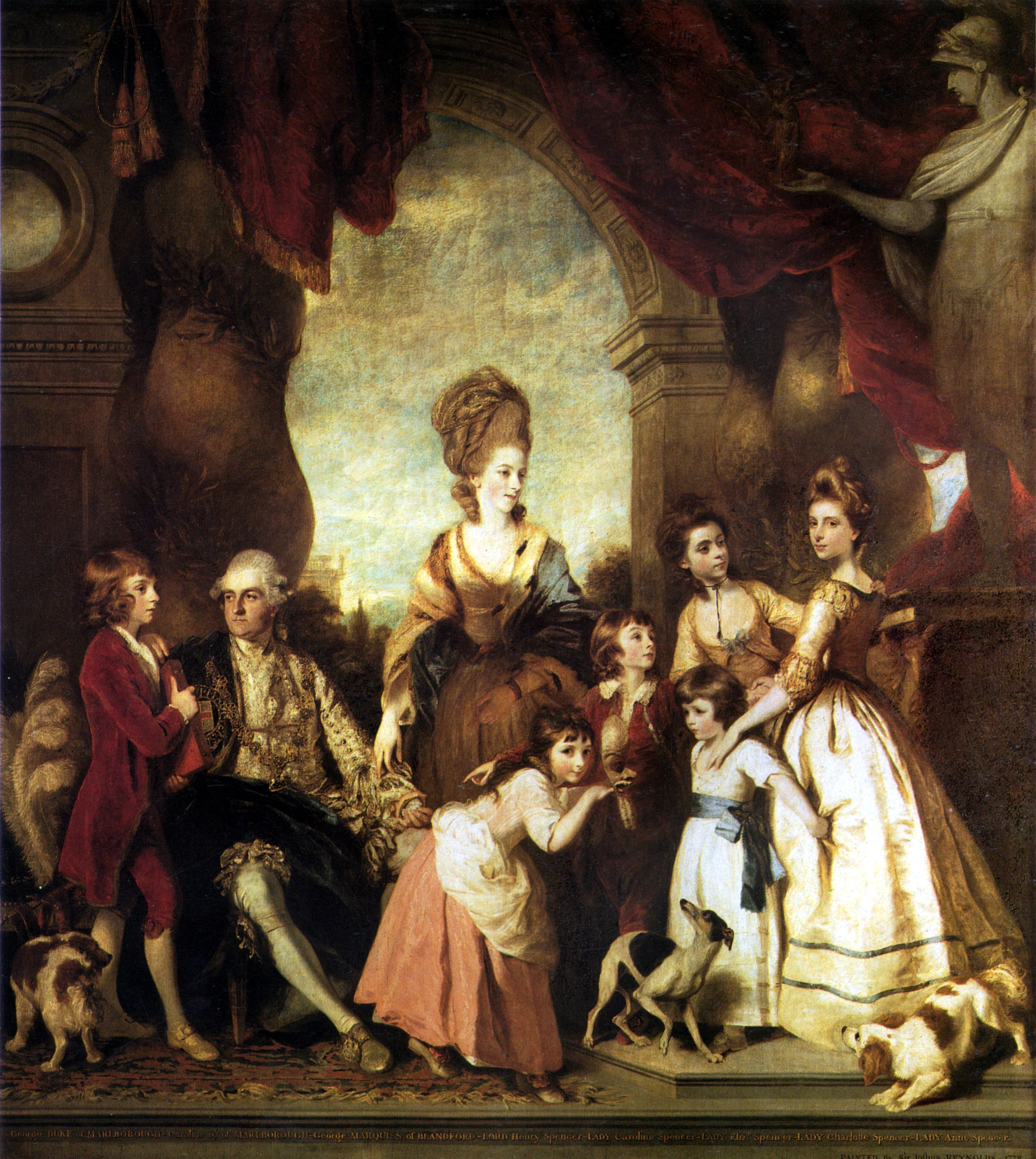
4th Duke of Marlborough, Duchess of Marlborough and their family by Sir Joshua Reynolds, c.1777-78

The Duke was made a Knight of the Garter in 1768, and was elected to the Royal Society in 1786.

== Family ==
Marlborough married Lady Caroline Russell (1743–1811), daughter of John Russell, 4th Duke of Bedford, in 1762, by whom he had eight children:

- Lady Caroline Spencer (1763–1813), married Henry Agar-Ellis, 2nd Viscount Clifden and had issue, including George Agar-Ellis, 1st Baron Dover.
- Lady Elizabeth Spencer (1764–1812), married her cousin John Spencer (a grandson of the 3rd Duke of Marlborough) and had issue.
- George Spencer-Churchill, 5th Duke of Marlborough (1766–1840)
- Lady Charlotte Spencer (1769–1802), married Rev. Edward Nares and had issue.
- Lord Henry John Spencer (1770–1795)
- Lady Anne Spencer (1773–1865), married Cropley Ashley-Cooper, 6th Earl of Shaftesbury and had issue.
- Lady Amelia Spencer (1774–1829), married Henry Pytches Boyce.
- Lord Francis Almeric Spencer (1779–1845), created Baron Churchill in 1815.

The Duchess of Marlborough died at Blenheim Palace in November 1811, aged 68. The Duke of Marlborough died at Blenheim Palace in January 1817, aged 78, and was buried there.

== Gallery ==
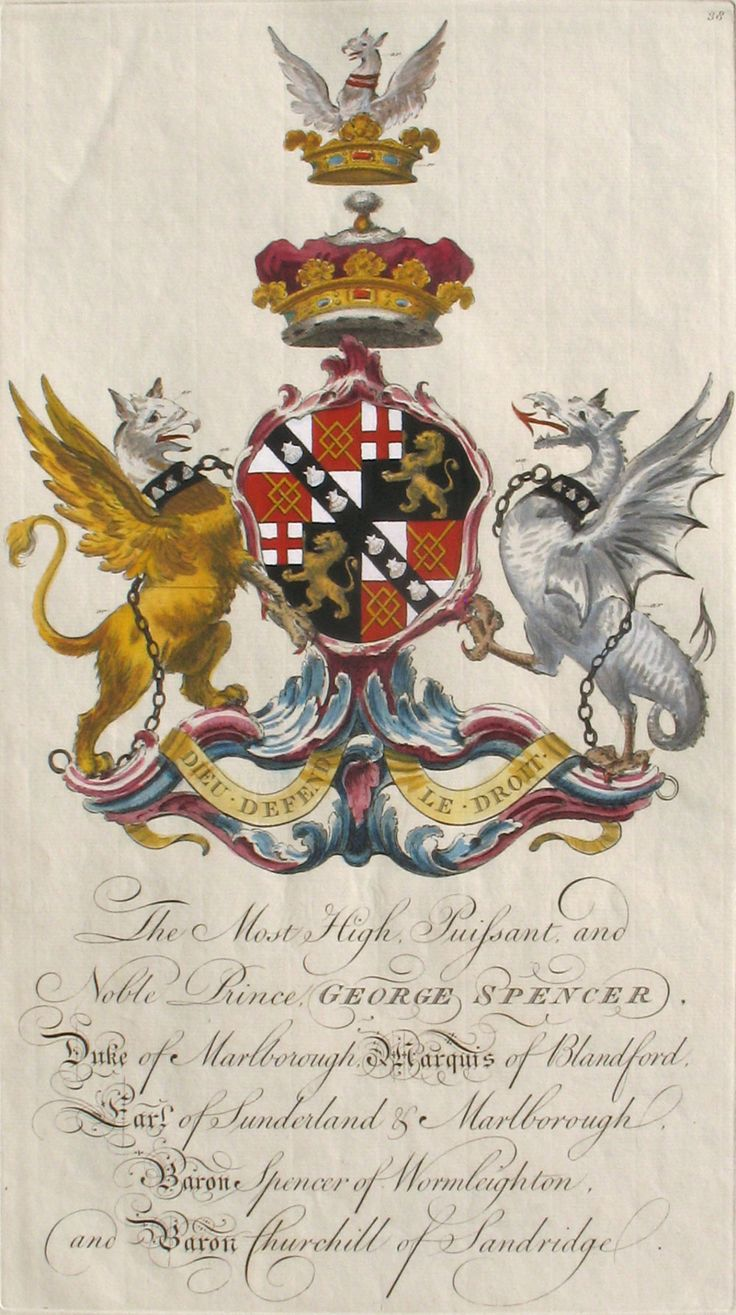
Coat of arms

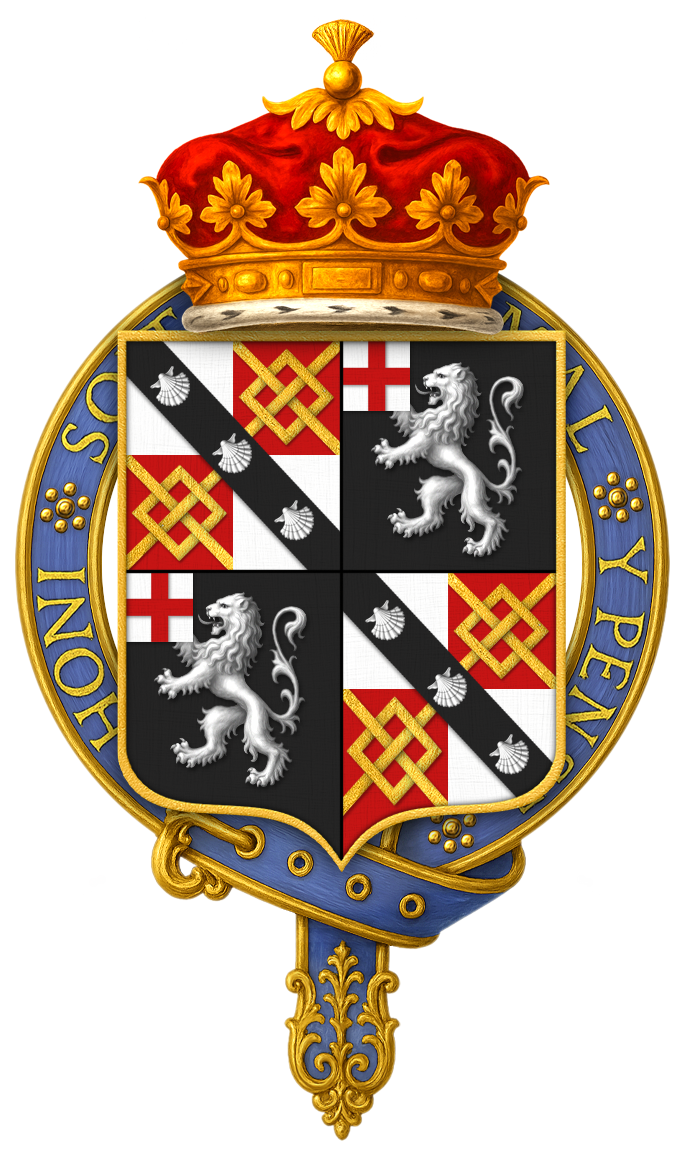
Coat of arms illustration

Honorary titles
| Vacant Title last held by The Duke of Marlborough | Lord Lieutenant of Oxfordshire; 1760–1817 | Succeeded by The Earl of Macclesfield |
| Preceded by The Marquess Townshend | Senior Privy Counsellor; 1807–1817 | Succeeded by Lord Charles Spencer |
Political offices
| Preceded by The Duke of Devonshire | Lord Chamberlain; 1762–1763 | Succeeded by The Earl Gower |
| Preceded by The Duke of Bedford | Lord Privy Seal; 1763–1765 | Succeeded by The Duke of Newcastle |
Peerage of England
| Preceded by Charles Spencer | Duke of Marlborough; 1758–1817 | Succeeded by George Spencer-Churchill |
| Preceded by Charles Spencer | Baron Spencer of Wormleighton (descended by acceleration); 1758–1806 | Succeeded by George Spencer-Churchill |
