= Duke of Marlborough (disambiguation) =

Duke of Marlborough or Duchess of Marlborough may refer to a British peerage title or to any of its holders and consorts:

== Dukes ==
- John Churchill, 1st Duke of Marlborough, an outstanding general. Any reference to the Duke of Marlborough is usually to him.
- Charles Spencer, 3rd Duke of Marlborough (1706–1758)
- George Spencer, 4th Duke of Marlborough (1739–1817)
- George Spencer-Churchill, 5th Duke of Marlborough (1766–1840)
- George Spencer-Churchill, 6th Duke of Marlborough (1793–1857)
- John Winston Spencer-Churchill, 7th Duke of Marlborough (1822–1883)
- George Charles Spencer-Churchill, 8th Duke of Marlborough (1844–1892)
- Charles Richard Spencer-Churchill, 9th Duke of Marlborough (1871–1934)
- John Albert William Spencer-Churchill, 10th Duke of Marlborough (1897–1972)
- John George Vanderbilt Spencer-Churchill, 11th Duke of Marlborough (1926–2014)
- Jamie Spencer-Churchill, 12th Duke of Marlborough (b. November 24, 1955), current holder of title
  - George Spencer-Churchill, Earl of Sunderland (b. July 28, 1992), son and heir apparent of 12th Duke

== Duchesses ==
- Henrietta Godolphin, 2nd Duchess of Marlborough (1681–1733)
- Sarah Churchill, Duchess of Marlborough (1660–1744), wife of the 1st Duke, favourite of Queen Anne
- Consuelo Vanderbilt (1877–1964), wife of the 9th Duke, American heiress
- Rosita Spencer-Churchill, Duchess of Marlborough (Dagmar Douglas) (b. 1943), the current Duchess
- Georgiana Cavendish, Duchess of Devonshire (1757–1806), member of the Marlborough family
