= Earl of Sunderland =

British noble title

Earldom of Sunderland
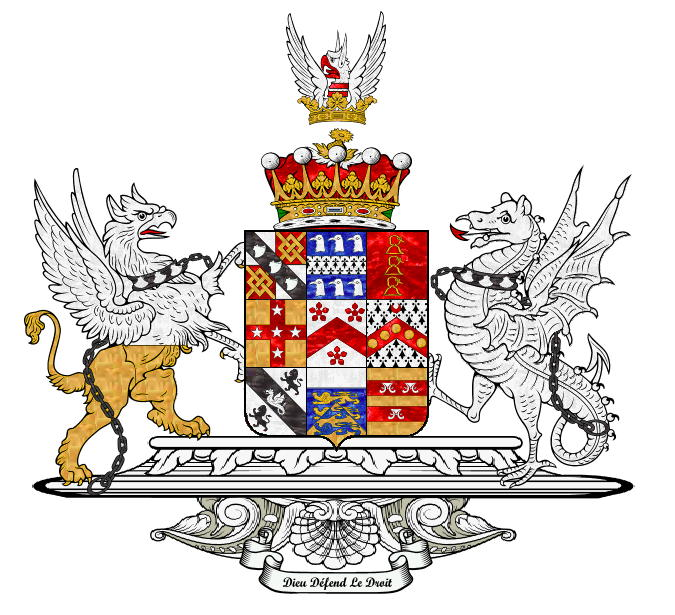
- Arms of Henry Spencer, 1st Earl of Sunderland
- Creation date: 1643
- Creation: Second
- Created by: Charles I
- Peerage: Peerage of England
- First holder: Henry Spencer, 3rd Baron Spencer of Wormleighton
- Present holder: James Spencer-Churchill, 12th Duke of Marlborough
- Heir apparent: George Spencer-Churchill (who formerly used this title as a courtesy title)

Earl of Sunderland is a title that has been created twice in the Peerage of England. The first creation came in 1627 in favour of Emanuel Scrope, 11th Baron Scrope of Bolton. The earldom became extinct upon his death in 1630, while the barony became either extinct or dormant (see Baron Scrope of Bolton for more information on this title). The second creation came in 1643 in favour of the Royalist soldier Henry Spencer, 3rd Baron Spencer of Wormleighton.

== History ==
The Spencer family descended from Sir John Spencer (d. 1522), who acquired the Wormleighton estate in Warwickshire and the Althorp estate in Northamptonshire. His grandson Sir John Spencer (d. 1586) was a Knight of the Shire for Northamptonshire. The latter's grandson Sir Robert Spencer represented Brackley in Parliament during the late 16th century. In 1603, Sir Robert was raised to the Peerage of England as Baron Spencer of Wormleighton. He was succeeded by his eldest surviving son, William, the second Baron. He had previously represented Northamptonshire in Parliament. His eldest son was the aforementioned third Baron. In July 1643, he was created Earl of Sunderland in the Peerage of England, but he was killed at the Battle of Newbury in September of the same year. He was succeeded by his two-year-old only son, Robert, the second Earl. He later gained great distinction as a statesman and notably served four times as Secretary of State for the Southern Department.

His eldest surviving son, Charles, the third Earl, also gained prominence as a statesman. He was Lord-Lieutenant of Ireland, Lord Privy Seal, Secretary of State for both the Northern and Southern Departments, Lord President of the Council and First Lord of the Treasury. However, his political career was ruined by the South Sea Bubble of 1720. Lord Sunderland married (as his second wife) Lady Anne Churchill, second daughter of the distinguished soldier John Churchill, 1st Duke of Marlborough, and Sarah Jennings. The dukedom of Marlborough was allowed to descend to the Duke's daughters and their sons after a special Act of Parliament was passed in 1716.

The third Earl was succeeded by his eldest surviving son (by his second wife), Robert, the fourth Earl. He died unmarried in 1729 at the age of 27 and was succeeded by his younger brother, Charles, the fifth Earl. In 1733, he succeeded his maternal aunt, Henrietta Godolphin, 2nd Duchess of Marlborough, as third Duke of Marlborough. The barony of Spencer of Wormleighton and earldom of Sunderland have remained subsidiary titles of the dukedom ever since. Earl of Sunderland has been used as the courtesy title of the Duke's eldest male-line grandson.

John Spencer, fourth son of the third Earl of Sunderland by his second wife, succeeded to the family estates in Northamptonshire in 1733 after his elder brother inherited the dukedom of Marlborough. His son John was created Earl Spencer in 1765. Robert Spencer, second son of the second Baron, had been created Viscount Teviot in 1685.

== Earl of Sunderland, first creation (1627) ==
- Emanuel Scrope, 1st Earl of Sunderland (d. 1630)

== Earl of Sunderland, second creation ==
=== Baron Spencer of Wormleighton (1603) ===
- Robert Spencer, 1st Baron Spencer of Wormleighton (1570–1627)
  - John Spencer (1590–1610)
- William Spencer, 2nd Baron Spencer of Wormleighton (1592–1636)
- Henry Spencer, 3rd Baron Spencer of Wormleighton (1620–1643) (created Earl of Sunderland in 1643)

=== Earl of Sunderland (1643) ===
- Henry Spencer, 1st Earl of Sunderland (1620–1643)
- Robert Spencer, 2nd Earl of Sunderland (1640–1702)
  - Robert Spencer, Lord Spencer (1666–1688)
- Charles Spencer, 3rd Earl of Sunderland (1675–1722)
  - Robert Spencer (1700–1701)
- Robert Spencer, 4th Earl of Sunderland (1701–1729)
- Charles Spencer, 5th Earl of Sunderland (1706–1758) (succeeded as Duke of Marlborough in 1733)

For further succession, see Duke of Marlborough (title).

== Family tree ==
Spencer-Churchill family tree of the Dukes of Marlborough, Earls of Sunderland and Earls Spencer

Baron Spencer of Wormleighton, 1603
Robert Spencer; 1570–1627; 1st Baron Spencer of Wormleighton
John Spencer; 1590–1610	William Spencer; 1592–1636; 2nd Baron Spencer of Wormleighton	John Churchill; 1600–1673
Earl of Sunderland (2nd creation), 1643
Henry Spencer; 1620–1643; 1st Earl of Sunderland, 3rd Baron Spencer of Wormleighton	Winston Churchill; 1620–1688
Lord Churchill of Eyemouth (Scotland), 1682; Baron Churchill of Sandridge, 1685; Earl of Marlborough (2nd creation), 1689; Duke of Marlborough and Marquess of Blandford, 1702
Robert Spencer; 1640–1702; 2nd Earl of Sunderland, 4th Baron Spencer of Wormleighton	John Churchill; 1650–1722; 1st Duke of Marlborough, Marquess of Blandford, Earl of Marlborough, Lord Churchill of Eyemouth, and Baron Churchill of Sandridge	King James VII and II; 1633–1701	Arabella Churchill; 1648–1730
Francis Godolphin; 1678–1766; Earl of Godolphin	Henrietta Churchill; 1681–1733; 2nd Duchess of Marlborough, Marchioness of Blandford, Countess of Marlborough, and Baroness Churchill of Sandridge	Charles Spencer; 1675–1722; 3rd Earl of Sunderland, 5th Baron Spencer of Wormleighton	Anne Churchill; 1683–1716	John Churchill; 1686–1703; Styled Marquess of Blandford	James FitzJames; 1670–1734; Duke of Berwick	Henry FitzJames; 1673–1702; Duke of Albemarle (Jacobite)	Henry Waldegrave, Baron Waldegrave; 1661–1689	Henrietta FitzJames; 1667–1730
William Godolphin; 1700–1731; Styled Marquess of Blandford	Robert Spencer; 1701–1729; 4th Earl of Sunderland, 6th Baron Spencer of Wormleighton	Charles Spencer; 1706–1758; 3rd Duke of Marlborough, Marquess of Blandford, Earl of Marlborough, and Baron Churchill of Sandridge, 5th Earl of Sunderland, 7th Baron Spencer of Wormleighton	John Spencer; 1708–1746	Dukes of Berwick (Jacobite)	Dukes of Albemarle (Jacobite)	James Waldegrave, Earl Waldegrave; 1684–1741
Viscount Spencer and Baron Spencer of Althorp, 1761; Earl Spencer, 1765
George Spencer; 1739–1817; 4th Duke of Marlborough, Marquess of Blandford, Earl of Marlborough, and Baron Churchill of Sandridge, 6th Earl of Sunderland, 8th Baron Spencer of Wormleighton	John Spencer; 1734–1783; 1st Earl Spencer, Viscount Spencer, and Baron Spencer of Althorp	James Waldegrave, Earl Waldegrave; 1715–1763
Baron Churchill of Wychwood, 1815
George Spencer-Churchill; 1766–1840; 5th Duke of Marlborough, Marquess of Blandford, Earl of Marlborough, and Baron Churchill of Sandridge, 7th Earl of Sunderland, 9th Baron Spencer of Wormleighton	Francis Almeric Spencer; 1779–1845; 1st Baron Churchill of Wychwood	George Spencer; 1758–1834; 2nd Earl Spencer, Viscount Spencer, and Baron Spencer of Althorp	Hugh Seymour; 1759–1801	Anne Horatia Waldegrave; 1762–1801
George Spencer-Churchill; 1793–1857; 6th Duke of Marlborough, Marquess of Blandford, Earl of Marlborough, and Baron Churchill of Sandridge, 8th Earl of Sunderland, 10th Baron Spencer of Wormleighton	Francis George Spencer; 1802–1886; 2nd Baron Churchill of Wychwood	Augustus Spencer; 1807–1893	John Spencer; 1782–1845; 3rd Earl Spencer, Viscount Spencer, Baron Spencer of Althorp	Horace Beauchamp Seymour; 1791–1851
John Winston Spencer-Churchill; 1822–1883; 7th Duke of Marlborough, Marquess of Blandford, Earl of Marlborough, and Baron Churchill of Sandridge, 9th Earl of Sunderland, 11th Baron Spencer of Wormleighton	Georgiana Poyntz; 1799–1851	Frederick Spencer; 1798–1857; 4th Earl Spencer, Viscount Spencer, and Baron Spencer of Althorp	Adelaide Horatia Seymour; 1825–1877
Viscount Althorp, 1905
George Charles Spencer-Churchill; 1844–1892; 8th Duke of Marlborough, Marquess of Blandford, Earl of Marlborough, and Baron Churchill of Sandridge, 10th Earl of Sunderland, 12th Baron Spencer of Wormleighton	Randolph Henry Spencer-Churchill; 1849–1895	Augustus Spencer; 1851–1912	John Poyntz Spencer; 1835–1910; 5th Earl Spencer, Viscount Spencer, and Baron Spencer of Althorp	Charles Robert Spencer; 1857–1922; 6th Earl Spencer, Viscount Spencer, and Baron Spencer of Althorp, 1st Viscount Althorp
Viscount Churchill, 1902
Charles Richard John Spencer-Churchill; 1871–1934; 9th Duke of Marlborough, Marquess of Blandford, Earl of Marlborough, and Baron Churchill of Sandridge, 11th Earl of Sunderland, 13th Baron Spencer of Wormleighton	Winston Leonard Spencer Churchill; 1874–1965; Prime Minister of the United Kingdom; 1940–1945 and 1951–1955	Victor Albert Francis Charles Spencer; 1864–1934; 1st Viscount Churchill, 3rd Baron Churchill of Wychwood
(Descendants of Winston Churchill)
John Albert William Spencer-Churchill; 1897–1972; 10th Duke of Marlborough, Marquess of Blandford, Earl of Marlborough, and Baron Churchill of Sandridge, 12th Earl of Sunderland, 14th Baron Spencer of Wormleighton	Victor Alexander Spencer; 1890–1973; 2nd Viscount Churchill, 4th Baron Churchill of Wychwood	Richard Spencer; 1888–1956	Albert Spencer; 1892–1975; 7th Earl Spencer, Viscount Spencer, and Baron Spencer of Althorp, 2nd Viscount Althorp
John George Vanderbilt Henry Spencer-Churchill; 1926–2014; 11th Duke of Marlborough, Marquess of Blandford, Earl of Marlborough, and Baron Churchill of Sandridge, 13th Earl of Sunderland, 15th Baron Spencer of Wormleighton	Victor George Spencer; 1934–2017; 3rd Viscount Churchill, 5th Baron Churchill of Wychwood	Richard Spencer; 1926–2020; 6th Baron Churchill of Wychwood	Edward John Spencer; 1924–1992; 8th Earl Spencer, Viscount Spencer, and Baron Spencer of Althorp, 3rd Viscount Althorp
Viscountcy Churchill extinct, 2017
Charles James Spencer-Churchill b. 1955; 12th Duke of Marlborough, Marquess of Blandford, Earl of Marlborough, and Baron Churchill of Sandridge, 14th Earl of Sunderland, 16th Baron Spencer of Wormleighton	Michael Spencer b. 1960; 7th Baron Churchill of Wychwood	David Anthony Spencer b. 1970; Heir Presumptive to Wychwood	King Charles III b. 1948	Diana Frances Spencer; 1961–1997	Charles Edward Maurice Spencer b. 1964; 9th Earl Spencer, Viscount Spencer, and Baron Spencer of Althorp, 4th Viscount Althorp
George John Godolphin Spencer-Churchill b. 1992; Styled Marquess of Blandford	William, Prince of Wales b. 1982	Harry, Duke of Sussex b. 1984	Louis Frederick John Spencer b. 1994; Styled Viscount Althorp
Orlando Spencer-Churchill b. 2026; Styled Earl of Sunderland
