= Duke of Marlborough (title) =

Title in the Peerage of England

Dukedom of Marlborough
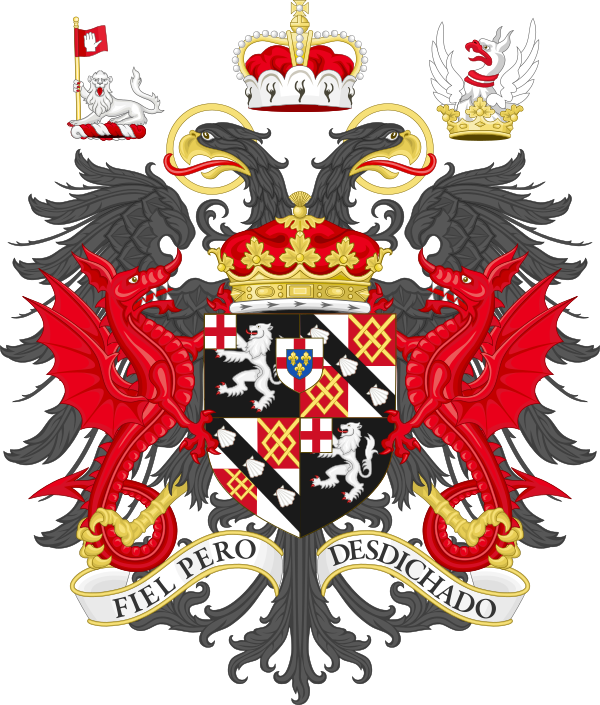
- Coat of arms
- Creation date: 1702
- Created by: Anne
- Peerage: Peerage of England
- First holder: John Churchill, 1st Earl of Marlborough
- Present holder: James Spencer-Churchill, 12th Duke of Marlborough
- Heir apparent: George Spencer-Churchill, Marquess of Blandford
- Remainder to: Special case (Semi-Salic)
- Subsidiary titles: Marquess of Blandford; Earl of Sunderland (from 1733); Earl of Marlborough; Baron Spencer (from 1733); Baron Churchill of Sandridge
- Seat: Blenheim Palace
- Former seat: Marlborough House
- Motto: Fiel pero desdichado (Spanish for 'Faithful but unfortunate')

Duke of Marlborough (pronounced /ˈmɔːrlbrə/) is a title in the Peerage of England. It was created by Queen Anne in 1702 for John Churchill, 1st Earl of Marlborough (1650–1722), the noted military leader. The Queen and the nation also gave him what became Blenheim Palace, unique as a national monument and family home. In historical texts, unqualified use of the title typically refers to the 1st Duke. The name of the dukedom refers to Marlborough in Wiltshire.

The earldom of Marlborough was held by the family of Ley from its creation in 1626 until its extinction with the death of the 4th earl in 1679. The title was recreated 10 years later for John Churchill (in 1689).

== History of the dukedom ==
Churchill had been made Lord Churchill of Eyemouth (1682) in the Peerage of Scotland, and Baron Churchill of Sandridge (1685) and Earl of Marlborough (1689) in the Peerage of England. Shortly after her accession to the throne in 1702, Queen Anne made Churchill the first Duke of Marlborough and granted him the subsidiary title Marquess of Blandford.

In 1678, Churchill married Sarah Jennings (1660–1744), a courtier and influential favourite of the queen. They had seven children, of whom four daughters married into some of the most important families in Great Britain; one daughter and one son died in infancy. He was pre-deceased by his son, John Churchill, Marquess of Blandford, in 1703; so, to prevent the extinction of the titles, a special Act of Parliament was passed. When the 1st Duke of Marlborough died in 1722 his title as Lord Churchill of Eyemouth in the Peerage of Scotland became extinct and the Marlborough titles passed, according to the Act, to his eldest daughter Henrietta (1681–1733), the 2nd Duchess of Marlborough. She was married to Francis Godolphin, 2nd Earl of Godolphin and had a son who predeceased her.

When Henrietta died in 1733, the Marlborough titles passed to her nephew Charles Spencer (1706–1758), the third son of her late sister Anne (1683–1716), who had married the 3rd Earl of Sunderland in 1699. After his older brother's death in 1729, Charles Spencer inherited the Spencer family estates and the titles of Earl of Sunderland (1643) and Baron Spencer of Wormleighton (1603), all in the Peerage of England. Upon his maternal aunt Henrietta's death in 1733, Charles Spencer succeeded to the Marlborough family estates and titles and became the 3rd Duke. When he died in 1758, his titles passed to his eldest son George (1739–1817), who was succeeded by his eldest son George, the 5th Duke (1766–1840). In 1815, Francis Spencer (the younger son of the 4th Duke) was created Baron Churchill in the Peerage of the United Kingdom. In 1902, his grandson, the 3rd Baron Churchill, was created Viscount Churchill.

In 1817, the 5th Duke obtained permission to assume and bear the surname of Churchill in addition to his surname of Spencer, to perpetuate the name of his illustrious great-great-grandfather. At the same time, he received Royal Licence to quarter the coat of arms of Churchill with his paternal arms of Spencer. The double-barrelled surname of "Spencer-Churchill" has been used by family members since 1817, although some members have preferred to style themselves simply as "Churchill".

The 7th Duke was the paternal grandfather of British Prime Minister Sir Winston Churchill, who was born at Blenheim Palace on 30 November 1874.

The 11th Duke, John Spencer-Churchill, died in 2014, having assumed the title in 1972. The 12th and present Duke is Charles James Spencer-Churchill.

== Estates and residences ==
=== Family seat ===
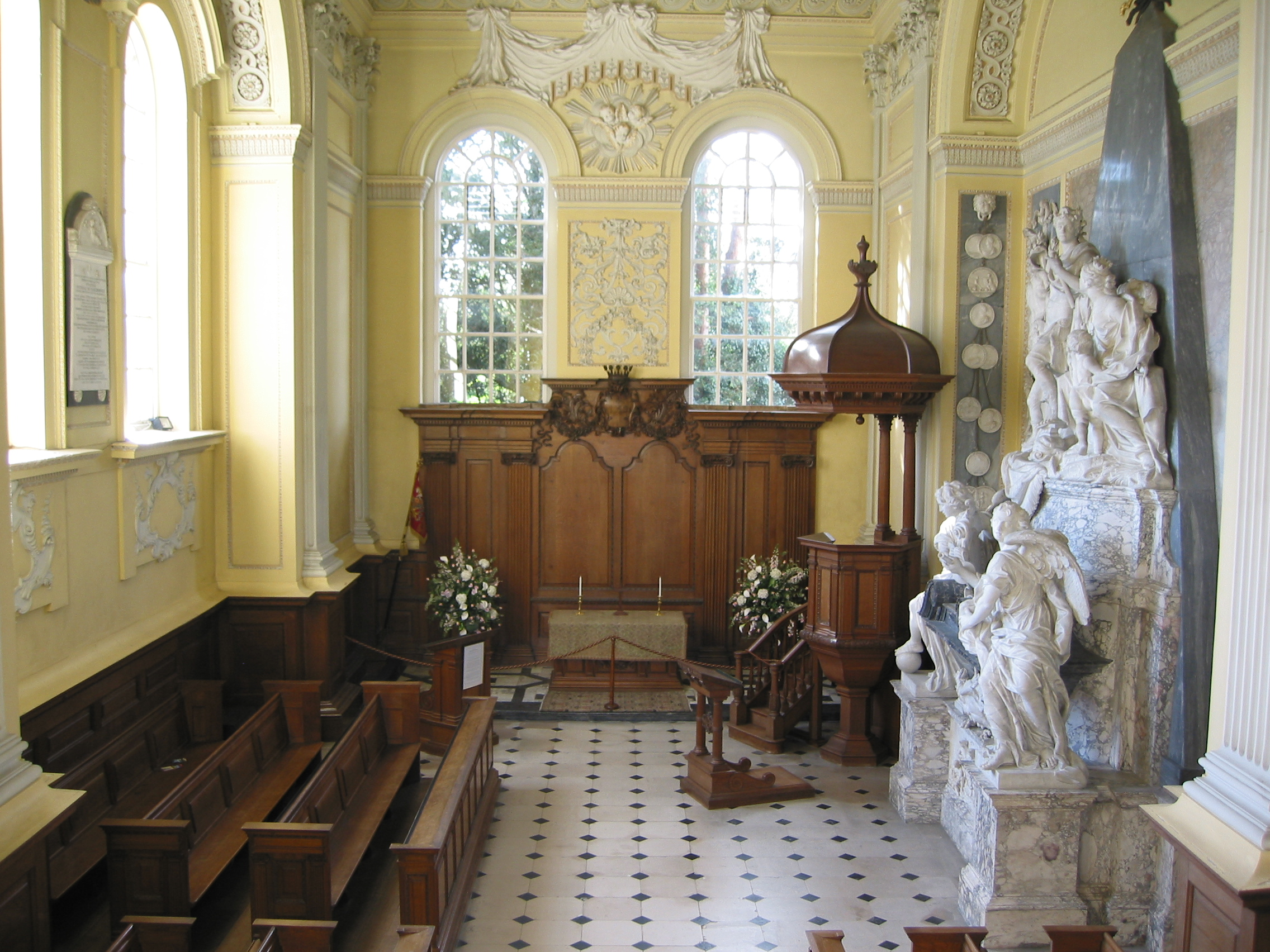
Burial place of most Dukes and Duchesses of Marlborough in the chapel at Blenheim Palace.

The family seat is Blenheim Palace in Woodstock, Oxfordshire.

After his leadership in the victory against the French in the Battle of Blenheim on 13 August 1704, the 1st Duke was honoured by Queen Anne granting him the royal manor of Woodstock, and building him a house at her expense to be called Blenheim. Construction started in 1705 and the house was completed in 1722, the year of the 1st Duke's death. Blenheim Palace has since remained in the Churchill and Spencer-Churchill family.

With the exception of the 10th Duke and his first wife, the dukes and duchesses of Marlborough are buried in Blenheim Palace's chapel. Most other members of the Spencer-Churchill family are interred in St. Martin's parish churchyard at Bladon, a short distance from the palace.

In 1994, the 11th Duke took legal action to ensure that his son James would not inherit control of Blenheim.

=== Estates ===
In the 1883 edition of John Bateman's The Great Landowners of Great Britain and Ireland, John Spencer-Churchill, 7th Duke of Marlborough's estates were recorded as spanning 23,511 acres across England, including 21,944 acres in Oxfordshire, 1,534 acres in Wiltshire, and 33 acres in Berkshire, which produced a combined annual income of £36,557.

=== London residences ===
==== Marlborough House ====
From 1711 to 1817 the London seat of the Dukes of Marlborough was Marlborough House, The Mall. Following the death of George Spencer, 4th Duke of Marlborough in 1817, Marlborough House reverted to the ownership of the Crown Estate, and the house was intended to be used as a London home for the-then second-in-line to the throne, Princess Charlotte of Wales. Princess Charlotte died in 1818 before preparations for her occupation of the house was complete, but her widower Prince Leopold of Saxe-Coburg-Saalfeld (later King Leopold I of the Belgians) occupied the house for several years.

==== Nineteenth Century ====
Following the death of the 4th Duke and the expiry of the lease of Marlborough House, George Spencer-Churchill, 5th Duke of Marlborough did not maintain a permanent London residence; however, his wife, Susan Spencer-Churchill, Duchess of Marlborough, maintained her London residence at No. 16 Grosvenor Place, Belgravia from 1817 to 1820, after which she rented a house in Cavendish Square. She later leased No. 5 Grosvenor Gate (later renumbered as No. 97 Park Lane) from Harriet Scott-Waring from 1829 to 1835, and then No. 35 Green Street (later renumbered as No. 129 Park Lane) from 1835 to 1841.

The 5th Duke died in 1840 and was succeeded by his son, George Spencer-Churchill, 6th Duke of Marlborough, who in turn was succeeded by his own son, John Spencer-Churchill, 7th Duke of Marlborough, in 1857. The 6th Duke’s widowed third wife, Jane, Duchess of Marlborough, leased No. 13 Upper Grosvenor Street from 1858 to 1863, and later leased No. 28 Grosvenor Street from 1868 until her death there in 1897. Her only son by the 6th Duke, Lord Edward Spencer-Churchill, inherited the leasehold of the house and lived there from 1899. He rebuilt the house in 1906–07 and continued to live there until his own death in 1911; his widow, Augusta, Lady Edward Churchill, continued to live at the house until 1940.

Prior to his father’s death, John Spencer-Churchill, Marquess of Blandford, leased No. 67 Brook Street, Mayfair as his London residence in 1852. Following his accession as 7th Duke of Marlborough in 1857, he continued to maintain the house in Brook Street as his London residence until 1859. He had taken No. 10 St James's Square as his London residence by 14 May 1860, when his daughter Lady Georgiana Spencer-Churchill was born at the house. The house continued to be the 7th Duke's London residence until he announced his intention to dispose of the property in September 1876 following his appointment as Lord Lieutenant of Ireland. By 1880 the House had been converted into a Gentlemen's Club, the Salisbury; since 1922 it has been known as Chatham House and served as the Headquarters of The Royal Institute of International Affairs.

Following his return from Ireland in 1880, the 7th Duke leased No. 29 Berkeley Square in 1882, where he died on 5 July 1883. His widow Frances Spencer-Churchill, Duchess of Marlborough leased No. 50 Grosvenor Square as her London residence from 1885 until her own death in 1899.

The 7th Duke was succeeded by his eldest son, George Spencer-Churchill, 8th Duke of Marlborough, who was then in the process of obtaining a divorce from his first wife, Albertha. As the divorce had not been finalised when the 8th Duke inherited the dukedom, Albertha was entitled to be known as Albertha, Duchess of Marlborough, but instead chose to continue to be known as Albertha, Marchioness of Blandford. Albertha’s London home was 108 Park Street, Mayfair from 1903 until her death in 1932. The 8th Duke remarried in 1888 to the wealthy American Lily Price Hamersley, widow of real-estate millionaire Louis Hamersley. From 1889 until his death in 1892, the 8th Duke leased No. 3 Carlton House Terrace as his London residence, which his widowed second wife Lily, Duchess of Marlborough continued to lease until 1903.

==== Sunderland House ====
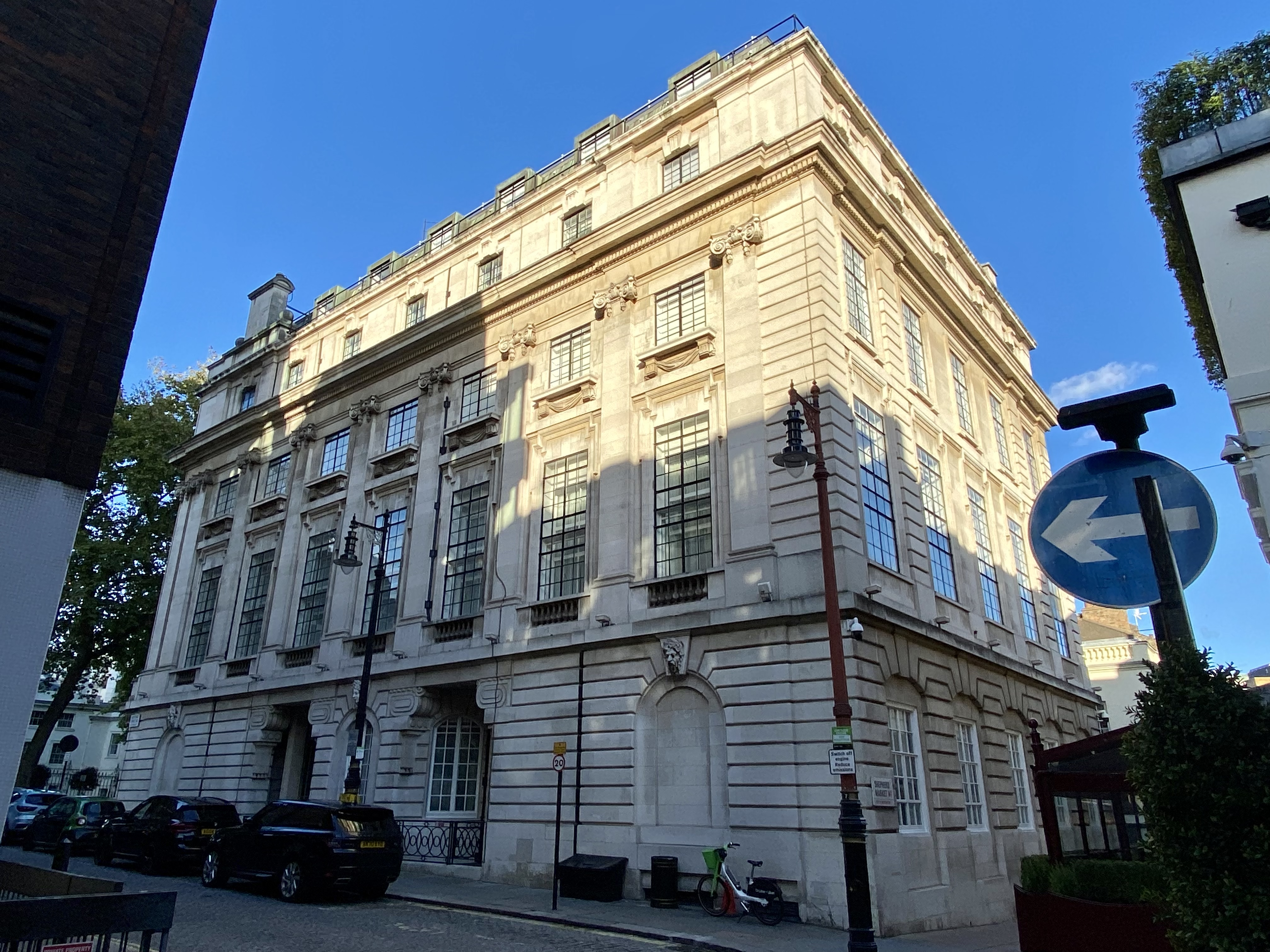
Sunderland House, now known as Lombard House

By the late 1800s financial pressures and dwindling income from the family estates resulted in the Dukes of Marlborough no longer maintaining a permanent London House. This changed when Charles Spencer-Churchill, 9th Duke of Marlborough married the wealthy American heiress Consuelo Vanderbilt in 1895; Consuelo's dowry included a Trust fund of $2,500,000 (£500,000) settled on her husband, as well as an income-for-life of $100,000 (£20,000) to be paid to Consuelo by her father, which more than doubled the income the 9th Duke received from his ancestral estates. During the early years of their marriage, the 9th Duke and Consuelo leased a series of London mansions, including Spencer House, 27 St James's Square in 1897, and Alington House, 8 South Audley Street in 1899.

The need for a permanent London residence to support the Duke's political aspirations resulted in Duke's father-in-law William Kissam Vanderbilt contributing an estimated $2,500,000 (£500,000) between 1901 and 1904 for the purchase of a freehold plot of land in Mayfair and construction of a London mansion for his daughter and son-in-law. The house was given the name Sunderland House following its completion, and served as the residence of the Duke and Duchess until their separation in 1906, after which it continued to be occupied by Consuelo until 1918, when she vacated the house for Government use. In June 1919 Consuelo purchased the lease of a smaller London residence at No. 1 Portman Square.

==== Twentieth Century ====
Following his formal separation from Consuelo, by 1917 the 9th Duke had leased a new London residence at No. 15 Great College Street, which he and his second wife Gladys, Duchess of Marlborough maintained as their London home until early 1926. In November 1926 the 9th Duke acquired a lease of a larger London house at No. 7 Carlton House Terrace, which remained as his London home until he died at the house in 1934. At the time of his death the lease had a remaining period of twelve years with an annual rent of £1,500. In the weeks following the Duke's death his executors sold the leasehold, with a new lease being granted by the Crown Estate to the German Government, who had already leased neighbouring properties at No. 8 and No. 9 Carlton House Terrace as part of the German Embassy in London.

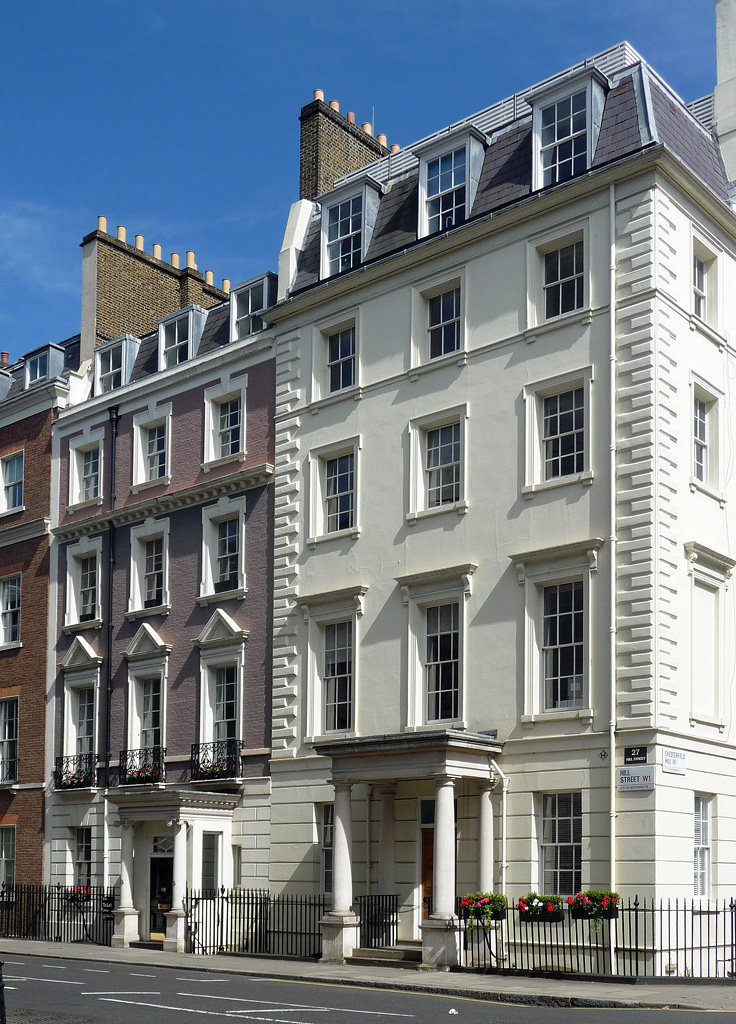
No. 27 Hill Street, London residence of the 10th Duke of Marlborough from 1928 to 1936

His son John Spencer-Churchill, Marquess of Blandford had been gifted the leasehold of No. 1 Portman Square by his mother Consuelo when he married the Hon. Mary Cadogan in 1920. Lord and Lady Blandford continued to reside at 1 Portman Square until May 1928, when they relocated their London household to No. 27 Hill Street, Mayfair. The lease of this large, 20-bedroom Georgian house was purchased from the Grosvenor Estate for a term of 50 years, with an annual ground rent payable of £275.

Following his father's death in 1934, Lord Blandford succeeded as the 10th Duke of Marlborough; attempts were soon made to dispose of his lease of 27 Hill Street by the Duke in 1936, and the sale was finalised in October. In November of the same year, the 10th Duke purchased the Crown Lease of a large, standalone London mansion at No. 11 Kensington Palace Gardens from Sir Malcolm Perks, 2nd Bt. 11 Kensington Palace Gardens continued to be used as the London residence of the 10th Duke and Duchess until the outbreak of the Second World War in 1939; during the War the house was requisitioned by the British Army. The Duke later sold his lease of 11 Kensington Palace Gardens to the French Government in September 1946 for £25,000, and the house became the Official Residence of the French Ambassador to the United Kingdom.

By 1950 John Spencer-Churchill, 10th Duke of Marlborough had established a new London residence at No. 1 Shepherd's Place, Upper Brook Street in Mayfair, which was his London home for the remainder of his life. Following his death in 1972 the house continued to be used by his son John Spencer-Churchill, 11th Duke of Marlborough until the early 2000s, and in 2006 the address was associated with the 11th Duke's fourth son Lord Edward Spencer-Churchill.

== Other titles of the Dukes ==
=== Subsidiary titles ===
The Duke holds subsidiary titles: Marquess of Blandford (created in 1702 for John Churchill), Earl of Sunderland (created in 1643 for the Spencer family), Earl of Marlborough (created in 1689 for John Churchill), Baron Spencer of Wormleighton (created in 1603 for the Spencer family), and Baron Churchill of Sandridge (created in 1685 for John Churchill), all in the Peerage of England. On 21 December 1682, the Scottish title Barony of Churchill of Eyemouth was created in the Peerage of Scotland for John Churchill, but became extinct upon his death in 1722.

The title Marquess of Blandford is used as the courtesy title for the Duke's eldest son and heir. The Duke's eldest son's eldest son can use the courtesy title Earl of Sunderland, and the duke's eldest son's eldest son's eldest son (not necessarily the eldest great-grandson) the title Lord Spencer of Wormleighton (not to be confused with Earl Spencer).

The title of Earl of Marlborough, created for John Churchill in 1689, had previously been created for James Ley, in 1626, becoming extinct in 1679.

=== Foreign titles ===
The 1st Duke was honoured with land and titles in the Holy Roman Empire: Emperor Leopold I created him a Prince in 1704, and in 1705, his successor Emperor Joseph I gave him the principality of Mindelheim (once the lordship of the noted soldier Georg von Frundsberg). He was obliged to surrender Mindelheim in 1714 by the Treaty of Utrecht, which returned it to Bavaria. He tried to obtain Nellenburg in Austria in exchange, which at that time was a landgraviate (Landgrafschaft), but this failed, partially because Austrian law did not allow for Nellenburg to be converted into a sovereign principality. The 1st Duke's princely title of Mindelheim became extinct either on the return of the land to Bavaria or on his death, as the Empire operated Salic law, which prevented female succession.

== Coats of arms ==
=== Original arms of the Churchill family ===
The original arms of Sir Winston Churchill (1620–1688), father of the 1st Duke of Marlborough, were simple and in use by his own father in 1619. The shield was Sable a lion rampant Argent, debruised by a bendlet Gules. The addition of a canton of Saint George (see below) rendered the distinguishing mark of the bendlet unnecessary.

The Churchill crest is blazoned as a lion couchant guardant Argent, supporting with its dexter forepaw a banner Gules, charged with a dexter hand appaumée of the first, staff Or.

In recognition of Sir Winston's services to King Charles I as Captain of the Horse, and his loyalty to King Charles II as a Member of Parliament, he was awarded an augmentation of honour to his arms around 1662. This rare mark of royal favour took the form of a canton of Saint George. At the same time, he was authorised to omit the bendlet, which had served the purpose of distinguishing this branch of the Churchill family from others which bore an undifferenced lion.

=== Arms of the 1st Duke of Marlborough ===
Sir Winston's shield and crest were inherited by his son John Churchill, 1st Duke of Marlborough. Minor modifications reflected the bearer's social rise: the helm was now shown in profile and had a closed grille to signify the bearer's rank as a peer, and there were now supporters placed on either side of the shield. They were the mythical Griffin (part lion, part eagle) and Wyvern (a dragon without hind legs). The supporters were derived from the arms of the family of the 1st Duke's mother, Drake of Ash (Argent, a wyvern gules; these arms can be seen on the monument in Musbury Church to Sir Bernard Drake, d.1586).

The motto was Fiel pero desdichado (Spanish for "Faithful but unfortunate"). The 1st Duke was also entitled to a coronet indicating his rank.

When the 1st Duke was made a Prince of the Holy Roman Empire in 1705, two unusual features were added: the Imperial Eagle and a Princely Coronet. His estates in Germany, such as Mindelheim, were represented in his arms by additional quarterings.

=== Arms of the Spencer-Churchill family ===
In 1817, the 5th Duke received a royal licence to place the quarter of Churchill ahead of his paternal arms of Spencer. The shield of the Spencer family arms is: quarterly Argent and Gules, in the second and third quarters a fret Or, over all on a bend Sable three escallops of the first. The Spencer crest is: out of a ducal coronet Or, a griffin's head between two wings expanded Argent, gorged with a collar gemel and armed Gules. Paul Courtenay observes that "It would be normal in these circumstances for the paternal arms (Spencer) to take precedence over the maternal (Churchill), but because the Marlborough dukedom was senior to the Sunderland earldom, the procedure was reversed in this case."

Also in 1817, a further augmentation of honour was added to his armorial achievement. This incorporated the bearings from the standard of the Manor of Woodstock and was borne on an escutcheon, displayed over all in the centre chief point, as follows: Argent a cross of Saint George surmounted by an inescutcheon Azure, charged with three fleurs-de-lys Or, two over one. This inescutcheon represents the royal arms of France.

These quartered arms, incorporating the two augmentations of honour, have been the arms of all subsequent Dukes of Marlborough.

=== Motto ===
The motto Fiel pero desdichado is Spanish for 'Faithful but unfortunate'. Desdichado means without happiness or without joy, alluding to the first Duke's father, Winston, who was a royalist and faithful supporter of the king during the English Civil War but was not compensated for his losses after the Restoration. King Charles II knighted Winston Churchill and other Civil War royalists but did not compensate them for their wartime losses, thereby inducing Winston to adopt the motto. It is unusual for the motto of an Englishman of the era to be in Spanish rather than Latin, and it is not known why this is the case.

=== Gallery of arms ===
Original arms of the Churchill family

Arms of Sir Winston Churchill, the father of the 1st Duke of Marlborough

Arms of the 1st Duke of Marlborough, with quarterings representing his estates in Germany

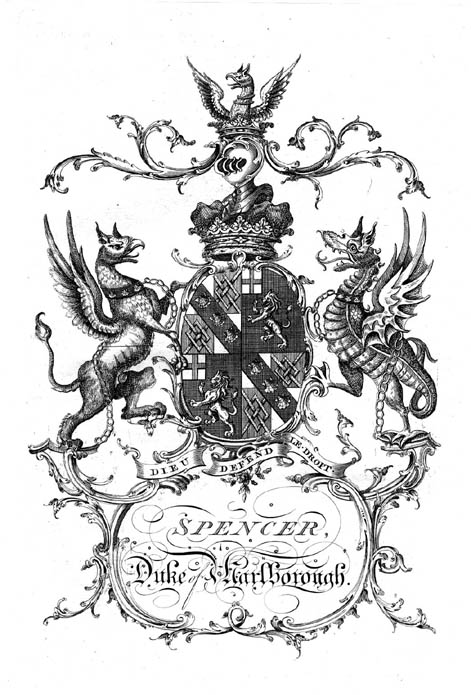
Simple arms of the Spencer Dukes of Marlborough before they changed their name to "Spencer-Churchill" and took the modern arms

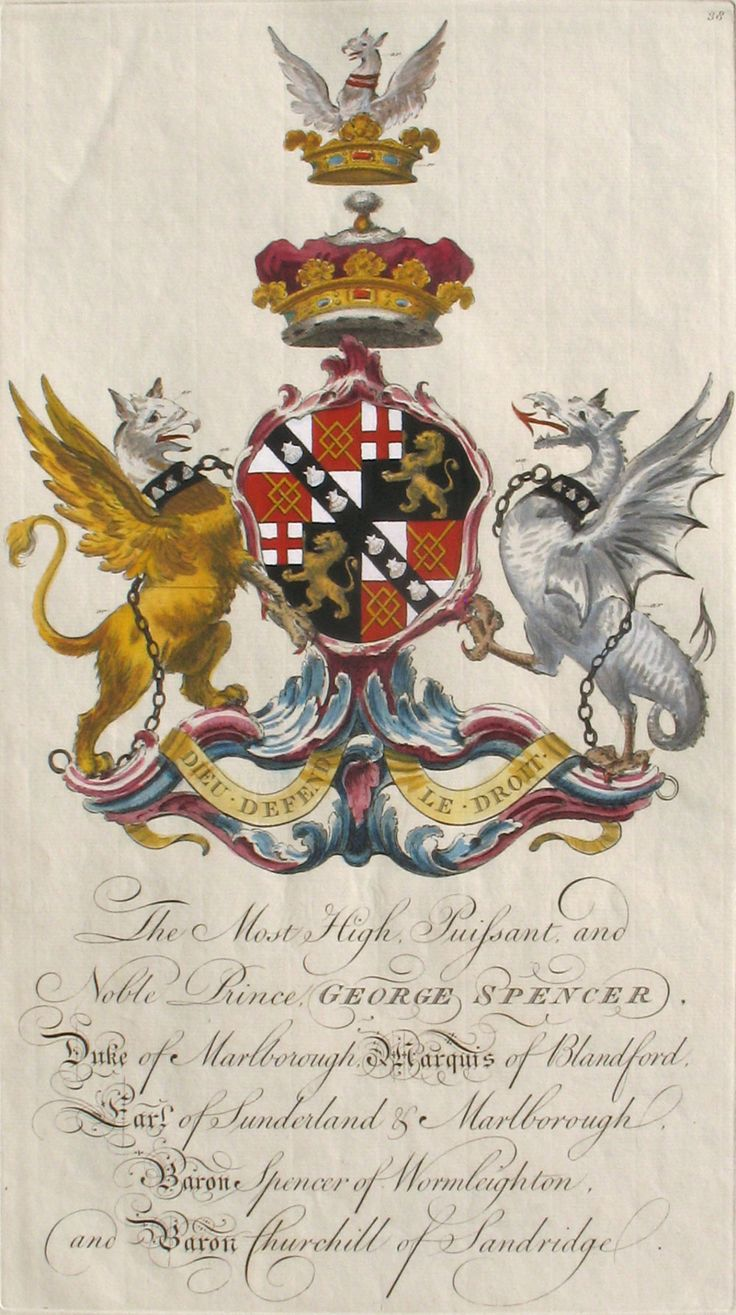
Arms of George Spencer, 4th Duke of Marlborough

Shield of the Spencer-Churchill Dukes of Marlborough since 1817

Arms of Winston Churchill (or any Spencer-Churchill) as a gentleman

Arms of Sir Winston Churchill as a Knight of the Garter

=== Achievement ===
Coat of arms of Duke of Marlborough
Adopted 1817 (by the 5th Duke of Marlborough). Coronet Coronet of a duke (above the escutcheon). Princely hat of the Holy Roman Empire (above the double-headed eagle). Crest 1st: a lion couchant guardant Argent supporting a banner Gules charged with a dexter hand couped Argent (Churchill); 2nd: out of a ducal coronet Or a griffin's head between two wings expanded Argent gorged with a collar gemel and armed Gules (Spencer). Escutcheon Quarterly: 1st and 4th, Sable a lion rampant Argent, on a canton of the second a cross Gules (Churchill); 2nd and 3rd, quarterly Argent and Gules, in the 2nd and 3rd quarters a fret Or, over all on a bend Sable three Escallops of the first (Spencer); over all in the centre chief point (as an augmentation of honour) an escutcheon Argent charged with Saint George's Cross surmounted by an inescutcheon Azure charged with three fleurs-de-lys Or, two over one. Supporters On either side: a wyvern wings elevated Gules. Behind: the imperial eagle of the Holy Roman Empire. Motto Fiel Pero Desdichado (Spanish for 'Faithful but unfortunate').

== List of title holders ==
=== Earls of Marlborough, first creation (1626–1679) ===
The earldom of Marlborough was held by the family of Ley from 1626 to 1679. James Ley, the 1st Earl (c. 1550 – 1629), was lord chief justice of the King's Bench in Ireland and then in England; he was an English member of parliament and was lord high treasurer from 1624 to 1628. In 1624, he was created Baron Ley and in 1626 Earl of Marlborough. The 3rd earl was his grandson James (1618–1665), a naval officer who was killed in action with the Dutch. James was succeeded by his uncle William, a younger son of the 1st earl, on whose death in 1679 the earldom became extinct.

=== Earls of Marlborough, second creation (1689) ===
Other titles: Lord Churchill of Eyemouth, in the county of Berwick (Scotland 1682) and Baron Churchill of Sandridge, in the county of Hertford (England 1685)
- John Churchill, 1st Earl of Marlborough (1650–1722), became Duke of Marlborough in 1702

=== Dukes of Marlborough (1702) ===
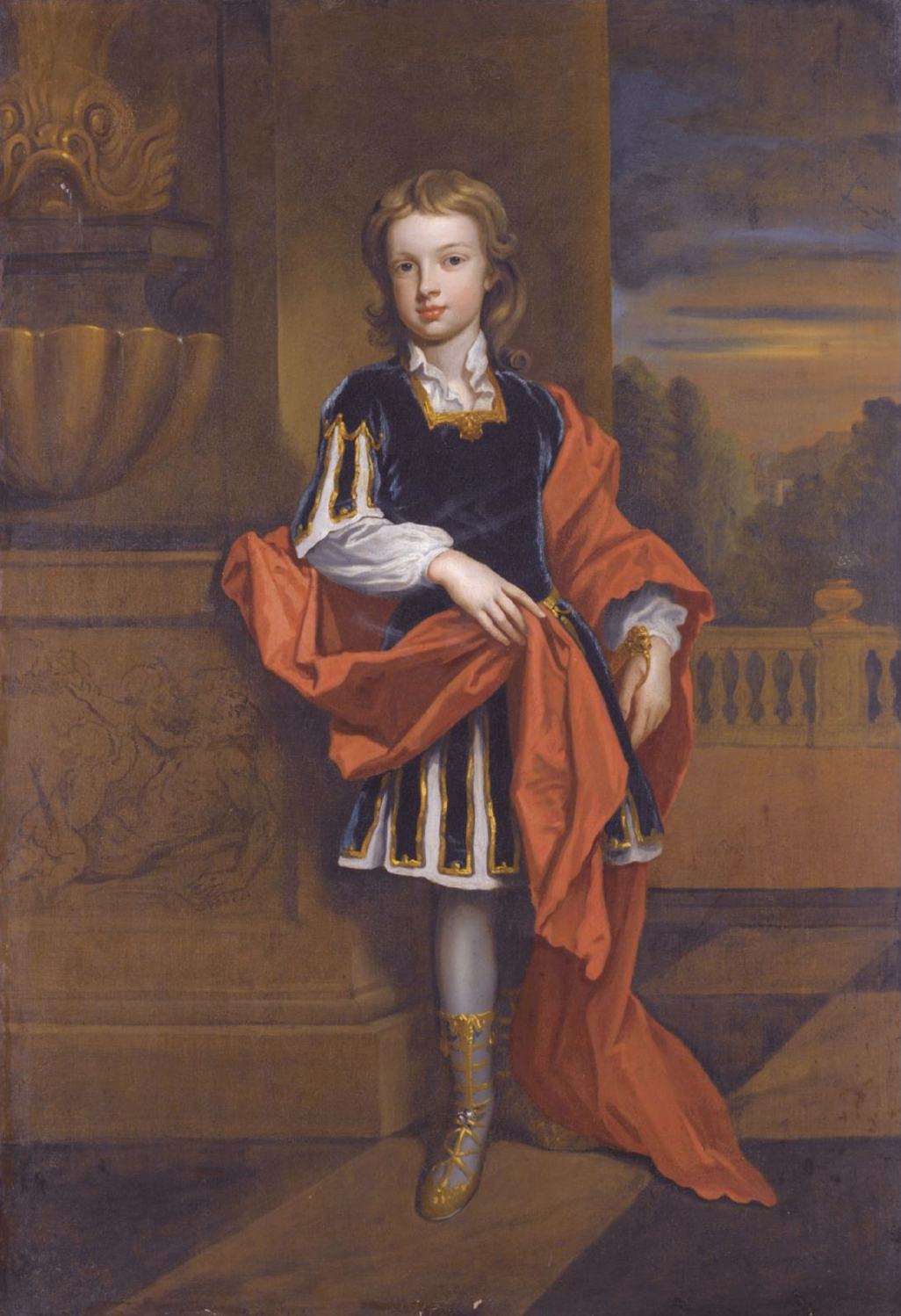
John Churchill, Marquess of Blandford (1686–1703)

Other titles: Marquess of Blandford (England 1702), Earl of Marlborough, in the county of Wiltshire (En 1689) and Baron Churchill of Sandridge, in the county of Hertford (England 1685)
Other titles (1st Duke): Lord Churchill of Eyemouth, in the county of Berwick (Scotland 1682)
- John Churchill, 1st Duke of Marlborough (1650–1722), soldier and statesman
  - John Churchill, Marquess of Blandford (1686–1703), elder son of the 1st Duke, died unmarried
- Henrietta Godolphin, 2nd Duchess of Marlborough (1681–1733), eldest daughter of the 1st Duke, succeeded her father by Act of Parliament (1706)
  - William Godolphin, Marquess of Blandford (1700–1731), elder son of the 2nd Duchess, predeceased his mother without issue
- Anne Spencer, Countess of Sunderland (née Lady Anne Churchill; 1683–1716), second daughter of the 1st Duke, married Charles Spencer, 3rd Earl of Sunderland, predeceased her elder sister, leaving male issue
Other titles (3rd Duke onwards): Earl of Sunderland (England 1643) and Baron Spencer of Wormleighton (England 1729)
- Charles Spencer, 3rd Duke of Marlborough (1706–1758), 5th Earl of Sunderland, second son of Anne Spencer, Countess of Sunderland
- George Spencer, 4th Duke of Marlborough (1739–1817), elder son of the 3rd Duke
- George Spencer-Churchill, 5th Duke of Marlborough (1766–1840), elder son of the 4th Duke
- George Spencer-Churchill, 6th Duke of Marlborough (1793–1857), eldest son of the 5th Duke
- John Winston Spencer-Churchill, 7th Duke of Marlborough (1822–1883), eldest son of the 6th Duke and paternal grandfather of Winston Churchill
- George Charles Spencer-Churchill, 8th Duke of Marlborough (1844–1892), eldest son of the 7th Duke
- Charles Richard John Spencer-Churchill, 9th Duke of Marlborough (1871–1934), only son of the 8th Duke
- John Albert William Spencer-Churchill, 10th Duke of Marlborough (1897–1972), elder son of the 9th Duke
- John George Vanderbilt Henry Spencer-Churchill, 11th Duke of Marlborough (1926–2014), elder son of the 10th Duke
- Charles James Spencer-Churchill, 12th Duke of Marlborough (b. 1955), eldest surviving son of the 11th Duke

The heir apparent to the dukedom is George John Godolphin Spencer-Churchill, Marquess of Blandford (b. 1992), eldest son of the 12th Duke.

== Succession to the title ==
The dukedom can theoretically pass through a female line. However, unlike the remainder to heirs general found in most other peerages that allow male-preference primogeniture, the grant does not allow for abeyance and follows a more restrictive Semi-Salic formula designed to keep succession wherever possible in the male line.

The patent originally provided that the Dukedom of Marlborough could be inherited by the heirs-male of the body of the first duke, Captain-General Sir John Churchill. However, one of his sons had died in infancy and the other died in 1703 from smallpox.

In 1706, the Parliament of England amended the letters patent creating the Dukedom. Under Parliament's amendment to the patent, designed to allow the famous general's honour to survive after his death, the dukedom was allowed to pass to the Duke's daughters; Lady Henrietta, the Countess of Sunderland, the Countess of Bridgewater and Lady Mary and their heirs-male—and thereafter "to all and every other the issue male and female, lineally descending of or from the said Duke of Marlborough, in such manner and for such estate as the same are before limited to the before-mentioned issue of the said Duke, it being intended that the said honours shall continue, remain, and be invested in all the issue of the said Duke, so long as any such issue male or female shall continue, and be held by them severally and successively in manner and form aforesaid, the elder and the descendants of every elder issue to be preferred before the younger of such issue."

Succession to the title under the first and second contingencies has lapsed; holders of the title from the 3rd Duke trace their status from the third contingency:

Succession	Notes
The heirs-male of the 1st Duke's body lawfully begotten.	Extinct in 1703 (the 1st Duke's sons all remained childless and predeceased him)
his eldest daughter and the heirs-male of her body lawfully begotten.	Henrietta succeeded as 2nd Duchess, but her son(s) had predeceased her by 1731
his second and other daughters, in seniority, and the heirs-male of her body lawfully begotten.	The present line; through Lady Anne Churchill; Male line from Lady Elizabeth Churchill was extinct in 1718/19; Male line from Lady Mary Churchill was extinct in 1727
his eldest daughter's oldest daughter and the heirs-male of her body lawfully begotten.	Lady Margaret Godolphin died young
his eldest daughter's second and other daughters, in seniority, and the heirs-male of her body lawfully begotten.	Lady Henrietta Godolphin died without issue Male line from Lady Mary Godolphin was extinct in 1964
all other daughters of his daughters, in seniority, and the heirs-male of her body lawfully begotten.	Male line from Lady Anne Spencer was extinct in 1802; Male line from Lady Diana Spencer was extinct in 1732; Male line from Lady Anne Egerton is extant (identical with that of the 3rd Earl of Jersey); Male line from Lady Isabella Montagu was extinct in 1787; Male line from Lady Mary Montagu was extinct in 1770
and other descendants into the future in like fashion, with the intent that the Marlborough title never become extinct.

It is now very unlikely that the dukedom will be passed to a woman or through a woman, since all the male-line descendants of the 1st Duke's second daughter Anne Spencer, Countess of Sunderland—including the lines of the Viscounts Churchill and Barons Churchill of Wychwood and of the Earl Spencer and of the entire Spencer-Churchill and Spencer family—would have to become extinct.

If that were to happen, the Churchill titles would pass to the Earl of Jersey, the heir-male of the 1st Duke's granddaughter Anne Villiers (born Egerton), Countess of Jersey, daughter of Elizabeth Egerton, Duchess of Bridgewater, the third daughter of the first Duke.

== Line of succession ==
Line of succession (simplified)
- John Churchill, 1st Duke of Marlborough (1650–1722)
  - Henrietta Godolphin, 2nd Duchess of Marlborough (1681–1733)
  - Anne Spencer, Countess of Sunderland (1683–1716)
    - Charles Spencer, 3rd Duke of Marlborough (1706–1758)
      - George Spencer, 4th Duke of Marlborough (1739–1817)
        - George Spencer-Churchill, 5th Duke of Marlborough (1766–1840)
          - George Spencer-Churchill, 6th Duke of Marlborough (1793–1857)
            - John Spencer-Churchill, 7th Duke of Marlborough (1822–1883)
              - George Spencer-Churchill, 8th Duke of Marlborough (1844–1892)
                - Charles Spencer-Churchill, 9th Duke of Marlborough (1871–1934)
                  - John Spencer-Churchill, 10th Duke of Marlborough (1897–1972)
                    - John Spencer-Churchill, 11th Duke of Marlborough (1926–2014)
                      - James Spencer-Churchill, 12th Duke of Marlborough (born 1955)
                        - (1) George Spencer-Churchill, Marquess of Blandford (b. 1992)
                          - (2) Orlando Spencer-Churchill, Earl of Sunderland (b. 2026)
                        - (3) Lord Caspar Spencer-Churchill (b. 2008) ^{2}
                      - (4) Lord Edward Spencer-Churchill (b. 1974) ^{2}
                    - Lord Charles Spencer-Churchill (1940–2016)
                      - (5) Rupert Spencer-Churchill (b. 1971) ^{2}
                      - (6) Dominic Spencer-Churchill (b. 1979) ^{2}
                        - (7) Ivor Spencer-Churchill (b. 2014)
                      - (8) Alexander Spencer-Churchill (b. 1983) ^{2}
                        - (9) Jake Spencer-Churchill (b. 2018)
                  - Lord Ivor Spencer-Churchill (1898–1956)
                    - male issue and descendants in remainder
              - Lord Randolph Spencer-Churchill (1849–1895)
                - Sir Winston Spencer-Churchill (1874–1965)
                  - Randolph Spencer-Churchill (1911–1968)
                    - Winston Spencer-Churchill (1940–2010)
                      - male issue and descendants in remainder
        - Francis Spencer, 1st Baron Churchill (1779–1845)
          - Barons Churchill
      - Lord Charles Spencer (1740–1820)
        - John Spencer (1767–1831)
          - Frederick Spencer (1796–1831)
            - Charles Spencer (1827–1898)
              - Sir Charles Spencer (1869–1934)
                - John Spencer (1907–1977)
                  - male issue and descendants in remainder
                - Charles Spencer (1909–1963)
                  - male issue in remainder
    - John Spencer (1708–1746)
      - John Spencer, 1st Earl Spencer (1734–1783)
        - Earls Spencer
  - Elizabeth Churchill, Countess of Bridgewater (1687–1714)
    - Anne Villiers, Countess of Jersey (1705–1762)
      - George Villiers, 4th Earl of Jersey (1735–1805)
        - Earls of Jersey

Notes and sources
Mark	Note
2	Issue from second marriage
3	Issue from third marriage

== Family trees ==
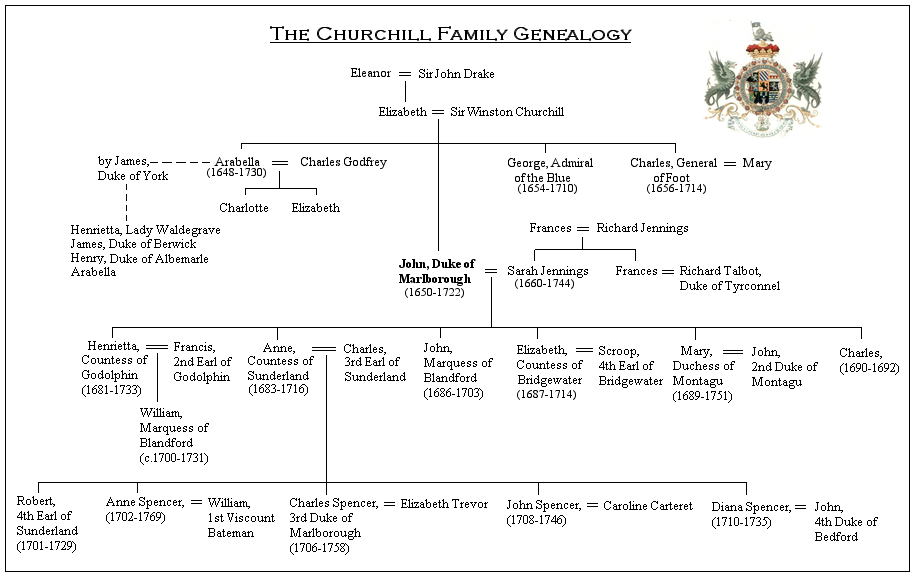
The 1st Duke of Marlborough's genealogy

Spencer-Churchill family tree of the Dukes of Marlborough, Earls of Sunderland and Earls Spencer

Baron Spencer of Wormleighton, 1603
Robert Spencer; 1570–1627; 1st Baron Spencer of Wormleighton
John Spencer; 1590–1610	William Spencer; 1592–1636; 2nd Baron Spencer of Wormleighton	John Churchill; 1600–1673
Earl of Sunderland (2nd creation), 1643
Henry Spencer; 1620–1643; 1st Earl of Sunderland, 3rd Baron Spencer of Wormleighton	Winston Churchill; 1620–1688
Lord Churchill of Eyemouth (Scotland), 1682; Baron Churchill of Sandridge, 1685; Earl of Marlborough (2nd creation), 1689; Duke of Marlborough and Marquess of Blandford, 1702
Robert Spencer; 1640–1702; 2nd Earl of Sunderland, 4th Baron Spencer of Wormleighton	John Churchill; 1650–1722; 1st Duke of Marlborough, Marquess of Blandford, Earl of Marlborough, Lord Churchill of Eyemouth, and Baron Churchill of Sandridge	King James VII and II; 1633–1701	Arabella Churchill; 1648–1730
Francis Godolphin; 1678–1766; Earl of Godolphin	Henrietta Churchill; 1681–1733; 2nd Duchess of Marlborough, Marchioness of Blandford, Countess of Marlborough, and Baroness Churchill of Sandridge	Charles Spencer; 1675–1722; 3rd Earl of Sunderland, 5th Baron Spencer of Wormleighton	Anne Churchill; 1683–1716	John Churchill; 1686–1703; Styled Marquess of Blandford	James FitzJames; 1670–1734; Duke of Berwick	Henry FitzJames; 1673–1702; Duke of Albemarle (Jacobite)	Henry Waldegrave, Baron Waldegrave; 1661–1689	Henrietta FitzJames; 1667–1730
William Godolphin; 1700–1731; Styled Marquess of Blandford	Robert Spencer; 1701–1729; 4th Earl of Sunderland, 6th Baron Spencer of Wormleighton	Charles Spencer; 1706–1758; 3rd Duke of Marlborough, Marquess of Blandford, Earl of Marlborough, and Baron Churchill of Sandridge, 5th Earl of Sunderland, 7th Baron Spencer of Wormleighton	John Spencer; 1708–1746	Dukes of Berwick (Jacobite)	Dukes of Albemarle (Jacobite)	James Waldegrave, Earl Waldegrave; 1684–1741
Viscount Spencer and Baron Spencer of Althorp, 1761; Earl Spencer, 1765
George Spencer; 1739–1817; 4th Duke of Marlborough, Marquess of Blandford, Earl of Marlborough, and Baron Churchill of Sandridge, 6th Earl of Sunderland, 8th Baron Spencer of Wormleighton	John Spencer; 1734–1783; 1st Earl Spencer, Viscount Spencer, and Baron Spencer of Althorp	James Waldegrave, Earl Waldegrave; 1715–1763
Baron Churchill of Wychwood, 1815
George Spencer-Churchill; 1766–1840; 5th Duke of Marlborough, Marquess of Blandford, Earl of Marlborough, and Baron Churchill of Sandridge, 7th Earl of Sunderland, 9th Baron Spencer of Wormleighton	Francis Almeric Spencer; 1779–1845; 1st Baron Churchill of Wychwood	George Spencer; 1758–1834; 2nd Earl Spencer, Viscount Spencer, and Baron Spencer of Althorp	Hugh Seymour; 1759–1801	Anne Horatia Waldegrave; 1762–1801
George Spencer-Churchill; 1793–1857; 6th Duke of Marlborough, Marquess of Blandford, Earl of Marlborough, and Baron Churchill of Sandridge, 8th Earl of Sunderland, 10th Baron Spencer of Wormleighton	Francis George Spencer; 1802–1886; 2nd Baron Churchill of Wychwood	Augustus Spencer; 1807–1893	John Spencer; 1782–1845; 3rd Earl Spencer, Viscount Spencer, Baron Spencer of Althorp	Horace Beauchamp Seymour; 1791–1851
John Winston Spencer-Churchill; 1822–1883; 7th Duke of Marlborough, Marquess of Blandford, Earl of Marlborough, and Baron Churchill of Sandridge, 9th Earl of Sunderland, 11th Baron Spencer of Wormleighton	Georgiana Poyntz; 1799–1851	Frederick Spencer; 1798–1857; 4th Earl Spencer, Viscount Spencer, and Baron Spencer of Althorp	Adelaide Horatia Seymour; 1825–1877
Viscount Althorp, 1905
George Charles Spencer-Churchill; 1844–1892; 8th Duke of Marlborough, Marquess of Blandford, Earl of Marlborough, and Baron Churchill of Sandridge, 10th Earl of Sunderland, 12th Baron Spencer of Wormleighton	Randolph Henry Spencer-Churchill; 1849–1895	Augustus Spencer; 1851–1912	John Poyntz Spencer; 1835–1910; 5th Earl Spencer, Viscount Spencer, and Baron Spencer of Althorp	Charles Robert Spencer; 1857–1922; 6th Earl Spencer, Viscount Spencer, and Baron Spencer of Althorp, 1st Viscount Althorp
Viscount Churchill, 1902
Charles Richard John Spencer-Churchill; 1871–1934; 9th Duke of Marlborough, Marquess of Blandford, Earl of Marlborough, and Baron Churchill of Sandridge, 11th Earl of Sunderland, 13th Baron Spencer of Wormleighton	Winston Leonard Spencer Churchill; 1874–1965; Prime Minister of the United Kingdom; 1940–1945 and 1951–1955	Victor Albert Francis Charles Spencer; 1864–1934; 1st Viscount Churchill, 3rd Baron Churchill of Wychwood
(Descendants of Winston Churchill)
John Albert William Spencer-Churchill; 1897–1972; 10th Duke of Marlborough, Marquess of Blandford, Earl of Marlborough, and Baron Churchill of Sandridge, 12th Earl of Sunderland, 14th Baron Spencer of Wormleighton	Victor Alexander Spencer; 1890–1973; 2nd Viscount Churchill, 4th Baron Churchill of Wychwood	Richard Spencer; 1888–1956	Albert Spencer; 1892–1975; 7th Earl Spencer, Viscount Spencer, and Baron Spencer of Althorp, 2nd Viscount Althorp
John George Vanderbilt Henry Spencer-Churchill; 1926–2014; 11th Duke of Marlborough, Marquess of Blandford, Earl of Marlborough, and Baron Churchill of Sandridge, 13th Earl of Sunderland, 15th Baron Spencer of Wormleighton	Victor George Spencer; 1934–2017; 3rd Viscount Churchill, 5th Baron Churchill of Wychwood	Richard Spencer; 1926–2020; 6th Baron Churchill of Wychwood	Edward John Spencer; 1924–1992; 8th Earl Spencer, Viscount Spencer, and Baron Spencer of Althorp, 3rd Viscount Althorp
Viscountcy Churchill extinct, 2017
Charles James Spencer-Churchill b. 1955; 12th Duke of Marlborough, Marquess of Blandford, Earl of Marlborough, and Baron Churchill of Sandridge, 14th Earl of Sunderland, 16th Baron Spencer of Wormleighton	Michael Spencer b. 1960; 7th Baron Churchill of Wychwood	David Anthony Spencer b. 1970; Heir Presumptive to Wychwood	King Charles III b. 1948	Diana Frances Spencer; 1961–1997	Charles Edward Maurice Spencer b. 1964; 9th Earl Spencer, Viscount Spencer, and Baron Spencer of Althorp, 4th Viscount Althorp
George John Godolphin Spencer-Churchill b. 1992; Styled Marquess of Blandford	William, Prince of Wales b. 1982	Harry, Duke of Sussex b. 1984	Louis Frederick John Spencer b. 1994; Styled Viscount Althorp
Orlando Spencer-Churchill b. 2026; Styled Earl of Sunderland
