= Lady Araminta Spencer-Churchill =

British equestrian and socialite

- Born: 8 April 2007 (age 19)
- Education: Oxford Brookes University
- Occupation: equestrian
- Parent(s): James Spencer-Churchill, 12th Duke of Marlborough; Edla Griffiths
- Relatives: Spencer family

Lady Araminta Clementine Megan Spencer-Churchill (born 8 April 2007) is a British equestrian and socialite.

== Early life and family ==
Spencer-Churchill was born on 8 April 2007 to James Spencer-Churchill, Marquess of Blandford and Edla Griffiths. Her father succeeded her grandfather, John Spencer-Churchill, 11th Duke of Marlborough, as the 12th Duke of Marlborough in 2014. She grew up in a farmhouse on the Blenheim Palace estate. Spencer-Churchill was educated at The Dragon School in Oxford and the Stowe School in Stowe. She went on to study events management at Oxford Brookes University.

== Equestrian career ==
Spencer-Churchill is an avid equestrian and a Junior British Eventing rider. She competes nationally and internationally, representing the United Kingdom in competitions in Poland and other countries. She has owned at least eight horses.

== Personal life ==
Spencer-Churchill served as a bridesmaid at the wedding of her half-brother, George Spencer-Churchill, Marquess of Blandford and Camilla Thorp in 2018.

On 29 November 2025, she was presented to society during Le Bal des Débutantes at the Hôtel Shangri-La in Paris. She was escorted by Baron Nicholas von Perfall and wore an Armani Privé gown and an emerald and diamond necklace that once belonged to Clementine Spencer-Churchill, Baroness Spencer-Churchill.
