= Schwäbisches Turmuhrenmuseum =

Horological museum in Hungerbachgasse, Mindelheim

Coordinates: 48.04698°N 10.48685°E

- Established: 1979
- Location: Hungerbachgasse 9, 87719 Mindelheim
- Type: Horological museum
- Website: Schwäbisches Turmuhrenmuseum (defunct)

The Schwäbisches Turmuhrenmuseum in Mindelheim, Germany is a small horological museum dedicated to the history of towerclocks. It is located in a former historic church, the Silvesterkirche, as well as the associated clocktower, the Kappelturm. Large working towerclocks are located on every floor of the tower, allowing the visitor to fully experience towerclocks in their natural environment.

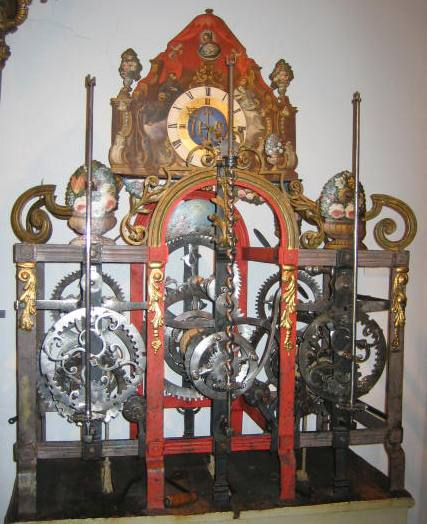
Schwäbisches Turmuhrenmuseum: The towerclock of the former Abbey of the town of Füssen

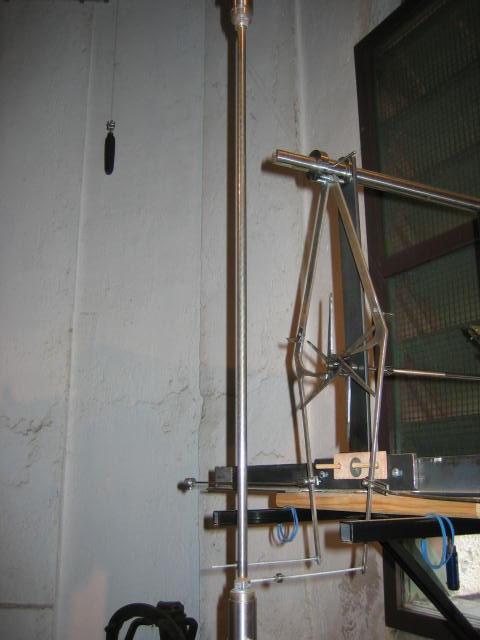
Schwäbisches Turmuhrenmuseum: The six-legged gravity escapement driving a 9-meter pendulum in the clocktower with a driveweight of 500 grams

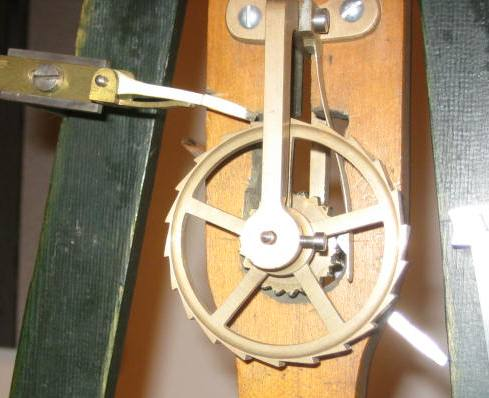
Schwäbisches Turmuhrenmuseum: The countwheel of the detached escapement of the 1872 towerclock, former town clock of Mindelheim, ran at 10 sec/week

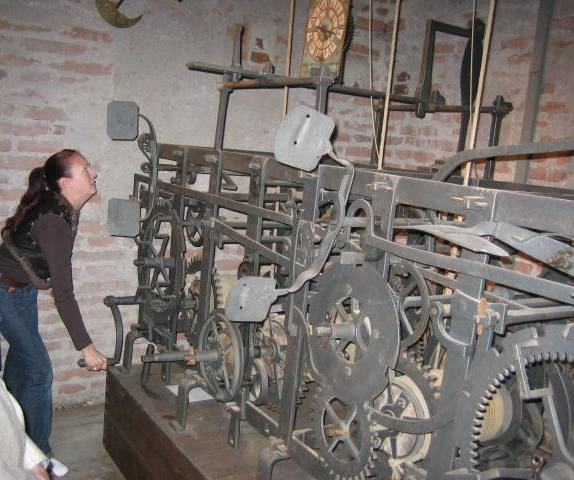
Schwäbisches Turmuhrenmuseum: Experiencing towerclocks in their natural environment, in a clocktower

== Collection ==
The collection focuses on towerclocks from the 16th through the early 20th century. It is particularly strong in German towerclocks of the late 19th and early 20th centuries. Altogether over 50 clocks are displayed, most of them in running condition. A special attraction is the world's second longest clock pendulum, over 9 meters long, ticking once every five seconds, housed in the tower. Their showpiece is the 1750 abbey clock from Füssen, a one of a kind piece forged by one of the monks. Another attraction is the replica of a 1529 clock with astronomical indications showing the location of sun and moon, as well as the occurrence of eclipses.

== History ==
The building, a church, originally dates from 1409, but was extensively adjusted to the baroque style of the time in 1763. It was desecularized in 1804 and became the towerclock museum in 1979, when the formerly private collection of Wolfgang Vogt became a public municipal museum.

== See also ==
- Horology
