= County of Nellenburg =

German County

Coordinates: 47.492°N 9.847°E

Nellenburg was a county or landgraviate (Landgrafschaft) in southwestern Germany. Named after the Nellenburg, the county surrounded the town of Stockach. It passed to Austria in 1465, after the extinction of the original comital line. Like the rest of Austria's Swabian territories, Nellenburg was ceded during the Napoleonic Wars, eventually falling to Baden.

After the Peace of Utrecht led to the loss of his Principality of Mindelheim, it was discussed to make John Churchill, 1st Duke of Marlborough prince of Nellenburg. Austrian law did not allow for the elevation into a sovereign principality though, and the plan was dropped in or after 1717. Nellenburg, therefore, never became a principality or a state of the Holy Roman Empire.
