= James Spencer-Churchill, 12th Duke of Marlborough =

English peer (born 1955)

His Grace The Duke of Marlborough
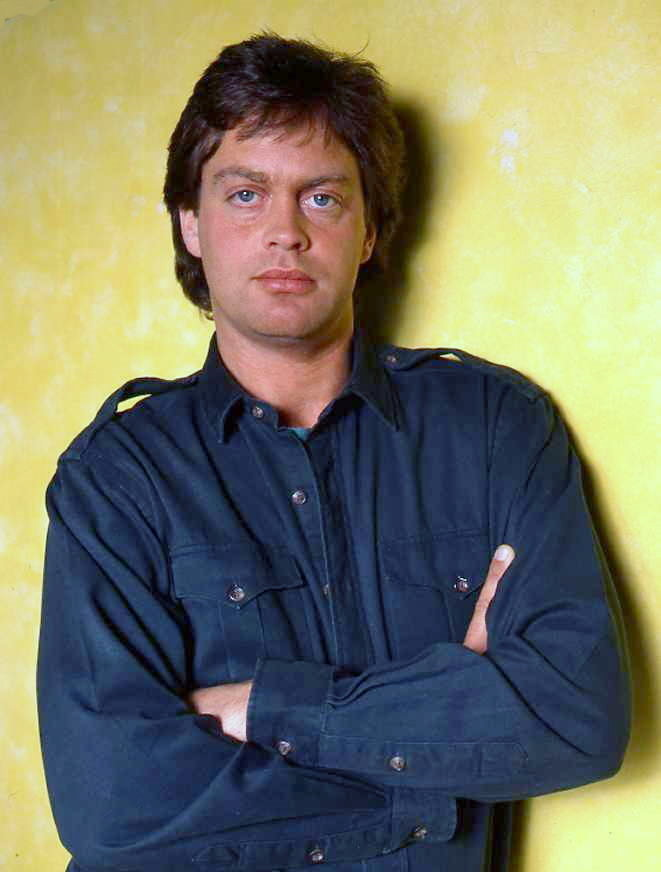
- Portrait by Allan Warren, 1989
- Tenure: 16 October 2014 – present
- Predecessor: John, 11th Duke of Marlborough
- Full name: Charles James Spencer-Churchill
- Other titles: Earl of Sunderland (1955–1972); Marquess of Blandford (1972–2014)
- Born: 24 November 1955 (age 70); Oxford, Oxfordshire, England
- Residence: Blenheim Palace
- Spouses: Rebecca Few Brown (m. 1990; div. 1998) Edla Griffiths (m. 2002; sep. 2024)
- Issue: George Spencer-Churchill, Marquess of Blandford; Lady Araminta Spencer-Churchill; Lord Caspar Spencer-Churchill
- Heir: George, Marquess of Blandford
- Father: John, 11th Duke of Marlborough
- Mother: Susan Mary Hornby

Charles James Spencer-Churchill, 12th Duke of Marlborough (born 24 November 1955), styled Earl of Sunderland until March 1972 and Marquess of Blandford until October 2014, and often known as Jamie Blandford or Jamie Marlborough, is a British peer and the current Duke of Marlborough.

He is the eldest surviving son of the 11th Duke of Marlborough and his first wife, Susan Mary Hornby. As a member of the Spencer family, he is a relative of the war-time Conservative Prime Minister Sir Winston Churchill (his first cousin, three times removed) and of Diana, Princess of Wales. He is also a descendant of the prominent American Vanderbilt family through his great-grandmother Consuelo Vanderbilt.

== Life ==
Born in Oxford, Marlborough was educated at Harrow and the Royal Agricultural College.

As Marquess of Blandford, he led a playboy life. Tatler reported that in the 1990s, the Happy Mondays lead singer Shaun Ryder remarked "If I was born into dough, I'd have done nothing forever. Like Jamie Blandford. He's fuckin' cool. I'd definitely produce his record."

In a bid to safeguard the Blenheim Palace estate from the then Marquess's excessive behaviour, his father won a court battle in 1994 to ensure his son never won control of the family seat, but their relationship may have improved later.

In 1995, he spent a month in prison for forging prescriptions. In September 2007, he was sentenced to six months in jail on two counts of dangerous driving and one of criminal damage following a "road rage" attack on another motorist's car. At the same time, he was banned from driving for three and a half years. In 2013, he was accused by a Sikh cab driver of abusing the driver with racist language.

On the death of his father, 'Sunny' Marlborough, in October 2014, the Oxford Mail noted the new duke's "well-publicised drug addiction" and reported that a spokesman for Blenheim Palace had said "the Palace will remain under the control of trustees", but that the 12th Duke could himself become one of the trustees. The Daily Telegraph reported that "The responsibility of maintaining one of Britain's grandest country houses for future generations now passes to 58-year-old Jamie Blandford, as he is commonly known, following a remarkable turnaround in his relationship with his late father, who once described him as the 'black sheep' of his family."

In 2021, seven years after having succeeded to the Dukedom of Marlborough, he successfully stood for election to Woodstock Town Council. He was subsequently re-elected without contest in 2024.

In 2022, Marlborough was taken to court by Porsche Financial Services for "refusing or failing to pay the outstanding £64,472.70 balance on the Cayenne E-hybrid Turbo S model he bought in July 2018." The outcome was that he was ordered to give up the car.

During the 2024 UK general election, the Duke supported the Reform UK party.

On 13 May 2024, Marlborough was arrested and charged with three alleged strangulation attacks on his estranged second wife Edla Marlborough between November 2022 and May 2024. In December 2025, he was charged with the intentional strangulation of his wife. On 5 January 2026, he pleaded not guilty to the charges and appeared again in Oxford Crown Court on 5 February 2026. The Duke subsequently pleaded not guilty to two additional charges of controlling or coercive behaviour. He was released on bail and a provisional trial date was set for 10 January 2028.

== Television appearance ==
On 24 June 2009, he appeared in a BBC Television documentary, Famous, Rich and Homeless, in which famous people were filmed spending three nights in the open with nothing but a sleeping bag, though he refused to "sleep rough". He claimed that on the first night he slept in the car park of a five-star hotel, though his sleeping bag was discovered unopened, and on the second night he demanded to be housed in a hotel. He refused to participate further despite giving an assurance that he would sleep rough on the third night, and ended his participation on that night. Another participant, Hardeep Singh Kohli, said that Blandford's behaviour was "disrespectful to all the people out there".

== Marriages and issue ==
His first wife was Rebecca Mary Few Brown (born September 1957, Bangor, Wales). They were married on 24 February 1990 at the Church of St Mary Magdalene, Woodstock. The marriage was dissolved in 1998. They had one son, who is now heir apparent to the Dukedom of Marlborough:

- George John Godolphin Spencer-Churchill, Marquess of Blandford (born 28 July 1992), who held the courtesy title Earl of Sunderland until his father's accession to the dukedom in 2014.

His second wife is Edla Griffiths (born 1968, Abergavenny, Wales), whom he married at Woodstock Register Office on 1 March 2002. They are separated. They have two children.

- Lady Araminta Clementine Megan Spencer-Churchill (born 8 April 2007)
- Lord Caspar Sasha Ivor Spencer-Churchill (born 18 October 2008)

== Arms ==
Coat of arms of James Spencer-Churchill, 12th Duke of Marlborough
Adopted 1817 by the 5th Duke of Marlborough Coronet The coronet of a duke Princely hat of the Holy Roman Empire (above the double-headed eagle) Crest 1st: a lion couchant guardant Argent supporting a banner Gules charged with a dexter hand couped Argent (Churchill); 2nd: out of a ducal coronet Or a griffin's head between two wings expanded Argent gorged with a collar gemel and armed Gules (Spencer) Escutcheon Quarterly: 1 and 4th, Sable a lion rampant Argent, on a canton of the second a cross Gules (Churchill); 2 and 3rd, quarterly Argent and Gules a fret Or, over all on a bend Sable three Escallops of the first (Spencer); over all in the centre chief point (as an augmentation of honour) an escutcheon Argent charged with the cross of Saint George surmounted by an inescutcheon Azure charged with three fleurs-de-lys Or, two over one Supporters On either side, a wyvern wings elevated Gules and behind, the Imperial eagle of the Holy Roman Empire Motto FIEL PERO DESDICHADO (Spanish for "Faithful, though unfortunate")

Peerage of England
Preceded by John Spencer-Churchill	Duke of Marlborough; 2014–present	Incumbent
Orders of precedence in the United Kingdom
Preceded by The Duke of Devonshire	Gentlemen; The Duke of Marlborough	Succeeded by The Duke of Rutland
