= Mindelheim =

- Town
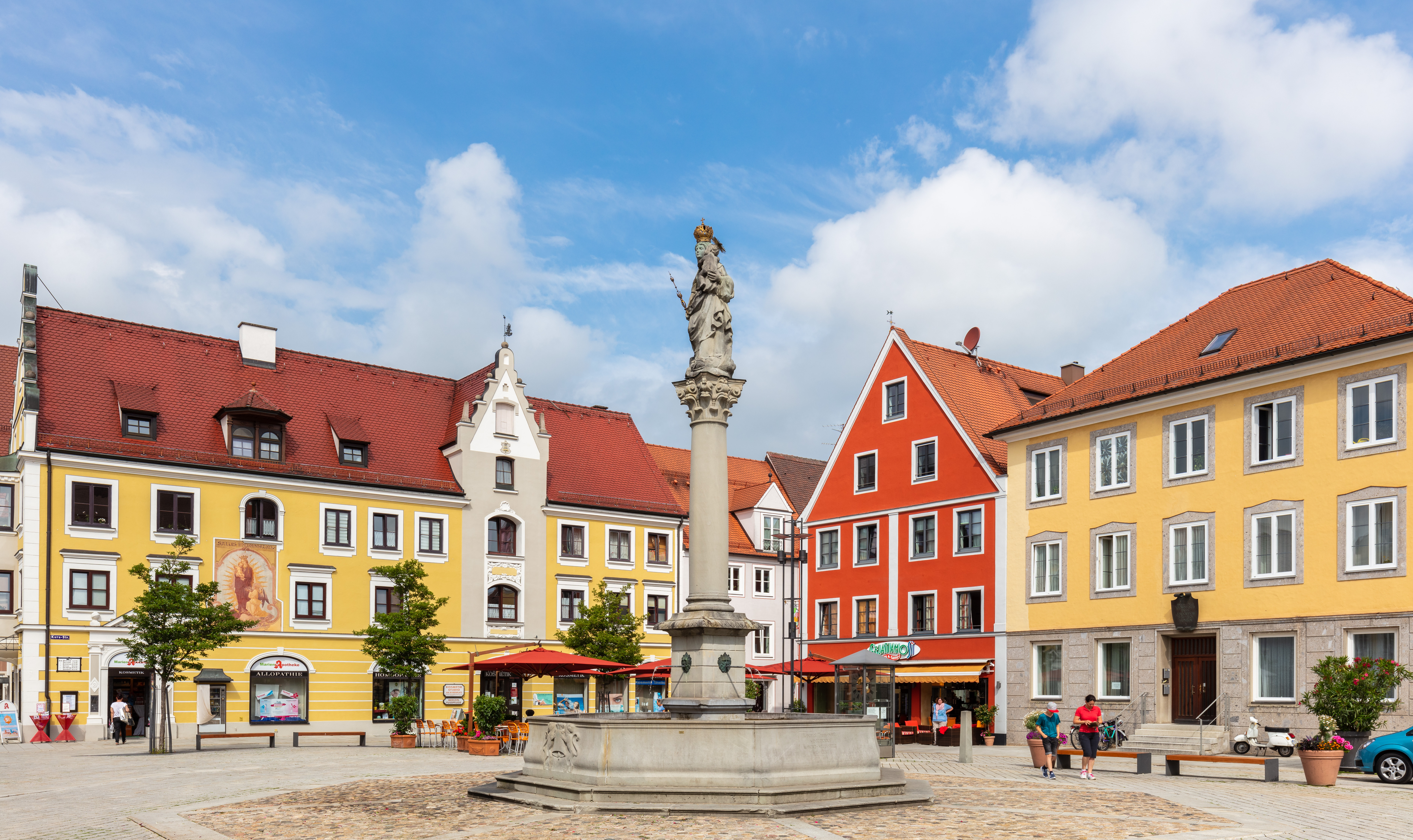
- Marian Square

- Coat of arms

- Location of Mindelheim within Unterallgäu district
- Interactive map of Mindelheim
- Location within Germany Location within Bavaria
- Coordinates: 48°02′N 10°28′E
- Country: Germany
- State: Bavaria
- Admin. region: Swabia
- District: Unterallgäu
- Subdivisions: 7 Stadtteile

Government
  - Mayor (2020–26): Stephan Winter (CSU)

Area
  - Total: 56.42 km^{2} (21.78 sq mi)
- Elevation: 607 m (1,991 ft)

Population (2025-12-31)
  - Total: 15,296
  - Density: 271.1/km^{2} (702.2/sq mi)
- Time zone: UTC+01:00 (CET)
  - Summer (DST): UTC+02:00 (CEST)
- Postal codes: 87711–87719
- Dialling codes: 08261
- Vehicle registration: MN
- Website: www.mindelheim.de

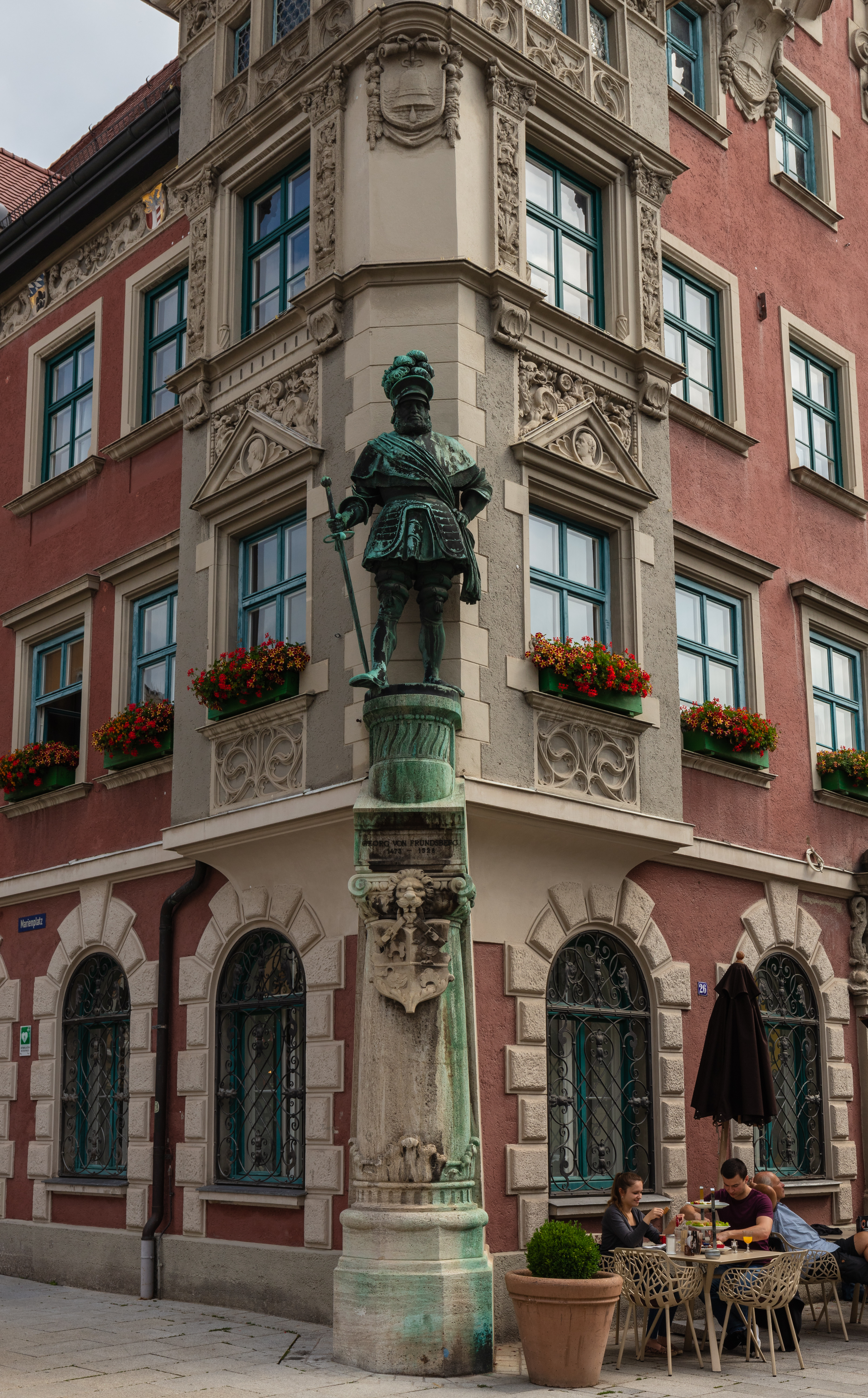
Town hall

Mindelheim (German pronunciation: [ˈmɪndl̩ˌhaɪm]; Swabian: Mindelhoi) is a town in Swabia, Bavaria, Germany. The town is the capital of the Unterallgäu district. At various points in history it was the chief settlement of an eponymous state.

== Geography ==
Mindelheim is located on the river Mindel, about 90 kilometres (56 miles) west of the Bavarian capital of Munich. Other towns nearby are Memmingen and the health resorts of Bad Grönenbach, Ottobeuren and Bad Wörishofen.

Mindelheim is located close to the Autobahn 96 leading from Munich to Lindau. Furthermore, Mindelheim station is on the Buchloe–Memmingen railway, which connects to Zürich via Memmingen and Lindau and to Munich via Buchloe, and the Central Swabian Railway (Mittelschwabenbahn), which connects to Günzburg via Krumbach.

== History ==
In 1365, the Dukes of Teck-Owen came into the possession of Mindelheim but had to sell their heritage around the castle Teck to the Counts of Württemberg. The last member of that line, Louis of Teck, Patriarch of Aquileia since 1412, died in 1439.

On 18 November 1705, John Churchill, 1st Duke of Marlborough, was made Prince of Mindelheim by Emperor Joseph I. Marlborough was invested at an Imperial Diet in Innsbruck on the 24 May 1706. Mindelheim had been bought by an Elector of Bavaria in the 16th century. It was confiscated from Elector Maximilian II Emanuel in 1704 for his treachery, and effectively occupied after the Battle of Blenheim.

The Principality of Mindelheim was situated south of the Danube, 28 miles (45 km) south-west of Augsburg, and 48 miles (77 km) west of Munich. It covered an area of about 15 square miles (39 km^{2}) and had an income of £2,000. Marlborough had to meet the cost of investiture, which was reduced to £4,500 from the usual £12–15,000. He also avoided paying the wartime imperial tax of £6,000.

The King of Prussia, through his representative the prince of Anhalt-Dessau, moved that the title should descend successively to all the heirs of Marlborough's body. But the princes were opposed. The lack of a male heir would prevent the Churchills from becoming hereditary princes of the empire, and was essential to their agreement. Thus no special remainder was provided.

Marlborough visited Mindelheim in late May 1713, receiving princely honours from his subjects. But the fate of the principality, and of Marlborough's effective territorial sovereignty, depended upon the ultimate peace treaty. Mindelheim was lost in 1714 to the Elector of Bavaria under the Treaty of Utrecht.

== Main sights ==
The town center of Mindelheim reflects the typical structure of a medieval settlement. The most important municipal buildings such as the town hall or churches are arranged around a central market square.

Like many other German cities, Mindelheim used to be surrounded by a city wall. As in most cases, this wall is now incomplete as it was partially torn down in the 19th century to make room for modern buildings. Nevertheless, the remaining parts of the wall and some gates give a good impression of its original state.

Besides the old town center, the castle Mindelburg — now housing a restaurant and a publishing company — used to guard the town in old times. The castle as well has not changed much in recent centuries. The complete annex displays the typical structure of a European fortress, including a donjon. This architectural ensemble is used to stage several festivals and markets.

Several museums and picture galleries are situated in Mindelheim as well; there is an ethnic art (Chinese, African, Arab) museum in Oberauerbach. The Schwäbisches Turmuhrenmuseum is dedicated to historic tower clocks.

== Transport ==
Mindelheim is served by the Buchloe–Memmingen railway.

== Twin towns ==
Mindelheim is twinned with several European towns:

- Bourg-de-Péage, France, since 1961
- East Grinstead, United Kingdom, since 1994
- Sant Feliu de Guixols, Spain, since 1994
- Schwaz, Austria, since 1990
- Tramin, Italy, since 1994
- Verbania, Italy, since 1994

== See also ==
- Principality of Mindelheim
