= Principality of Mindelheim =

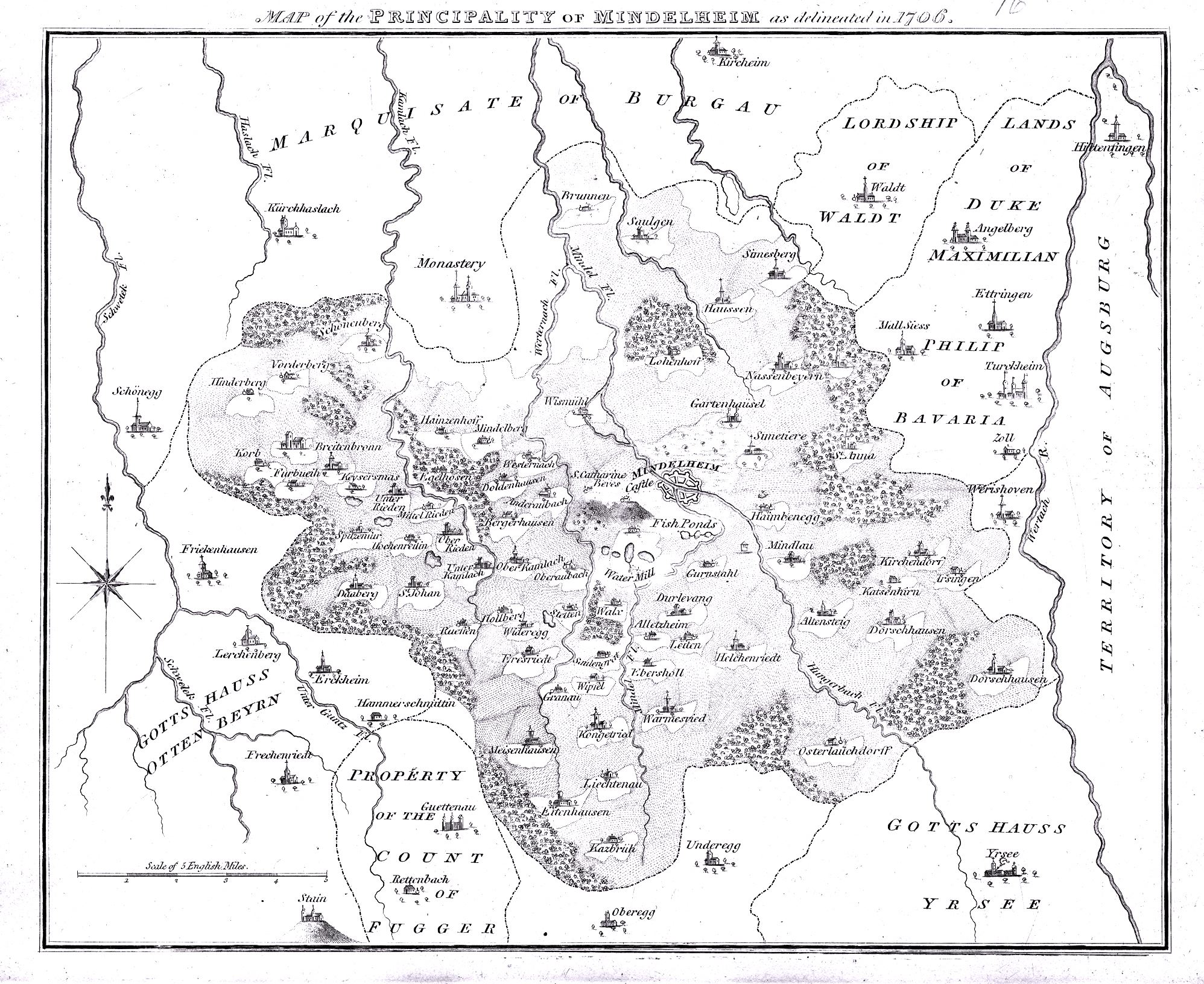
The Principality of Mindelheim, drawn in 1706, as published in Coxe's Marlborough

Mindelheim (German: [ˈmɪndl̩ˌhaɪ̯m]) was a minor state of Unterallgäu in Bavaria, Germany. It was part of the territory of Rechberg until 1467 when it was made a Lordship for the House of Frundsberg. It was raised to a Barony in 1569, was annexed by Maxelrain in 1586, annexed by Leuchtenberg in 1618, and created a Principality for John Churchill, Duke of Marlborough, in 1705 for his service in the War of the Spanish Succession.

== 1705 Creation ==
In recognition of Marlborough's efforts as commander-in-chief of the Grand Alliance's armies Emperor Leopold I proposed in 1704 to make Marlborough a sovereign prince of the Holy Roman Empire. He was created thus on 28 August 1704, then made Prince of Mindelheim on 18 November 1705 by Emperor Joseph I, and formally invested with this title on 24 May 1706 at the Imperial Diet. The principality was carved out of Imperial land in Swabia, and measured approximately fifteen square miles. The income from the Principality came to about £2,000 per annum, equivalent to about £475,000 in 2019.

Marlborough visited the principality only once in his life, in 1713, and stayed a mere four days. However he was well received by his subjects. He wrote of his visit 'I liked much better than expected but not so, as to think of living there'.

In 1713, as a conclusion of the war came about, Mindelheim was likely to be annexed by the Electorate of Bavaria. Marlborough succeeded in getting Mindelheim swapped for the county of Nellenburg in Further Austria, which was not elevated to be a principality. Mindelheim was duly annexed under the Treaty of Utrecht.

After the Treaty of Utrecht led to the loss of his Principality of Mindelheim, it was discussed to make John Churchill, 1st Duke of Marlborough prince of Nellenburg. Austrian law did not allow for the elevation into a sovereign principality though, and the plan was dropped in or after 1717. Nellenburg, therefore, never became a principality or a state of the Holy Roman Empire.

== Lords of Mindelheim (1467–1559) ==
- Ulrich X (1467–1478)
- Georg II (1478–1528)
- Casper (1528–1536)
- George III (1536–1559)

== Baron of Mindelheim (1559–1586) ==
- George III (1559–1586)

== Prince of Mindelheim (1705–1714) ==
- John Churchill, Duke of Marlborough (1705–1714)

== See also ==
- Mindelheim
