= George Spencer-Churchill, Marquess of Blandford =

British aristocrat and polo player

George Spencer-Churchill
- Marquess of Blandford
- Full name: George John Godolphin Spencer-Churchill
- Born: 28 July 1992 (age 34); London, England
- Spouse: Camilla Thorp (m. 2018)
- Issue: Lady Olympia Spencer-Churchill; Lady Leonora Spencer-Churchill; Orlando Spencer-Churchill, Earl of Sunderland
- Father: James Spencer-Churchill, 12th Duke of Marlborough
- Mother: Rebecca Few Brown

George John Godolphin Spencer-Churchill, Marquess of Blandford (born 28 July 1992), styled as Earl of Sunderland until 2014, is a British aristocrat and polo player. He is a model and brand ambassador for La Martina, an Argentine polo clothing and accessories company. As the heir apparent to the Dukedom of Marlborough, he uses the courtesy title of Marquess of Blandford.

== Early life and education ==
He is the son of James Spencer-Churchill, 12th Duke of Marlborough, and his first wife, Rebecca Mary Few Brown. He is also a descendant of Consuelo Vanderbilt (first wife of the 9th Duke of Marlborough). He is a half-brother of Lady Araminta Spencer-Churchill.

He and his family are notable for being involved in a high-profile legal dispute around 1993, when his paternal grandfather (the 11th Duke of Marlborough) sought to disinherit Lord Blandford's father. Since his father has had a controversial past, including serving time in jail for road rage and forging prescriptions, Lord Blandford was announced as the financial beneficiary of his grandfather's estate. His inheritance was to include Blenheim Palace, a 187-room mansion set in 2,000 acres in Oxfordshire.

He was educated at Harrow School, where he was captain of the school's polo team. From 2011 to 2014, he attended University College London, where he studied town planning.

== Career ==
In 2015, he started working as an aviation broker at JLT Group in London. In 2019, he became a broker at the London office of Arthur J. Gallagher & Co., an American insurance brokerage.

He began serving as a model and brand ambassador for the La Martina brand of polo clothes and accessories in 2015. His "Blenheim Polo Team" plays at Cirencester Park Polo Club in Gloucestershire.

== Personal life ==
From December 2018 to January 2019, he and three friends successfully rowed across the Atlantic Ocean in a time of 35 days, finishing second in the 2018 Talisker Whisky Atlantic Challenge. He helped raise over £850,000 for the Starlight children's charity in the process.

The Marquess and his wife, the Marchioness, attended the Sotheby's Royal & Noble Jewels sale, and this event featured a candlelit dinner, attended by a number of notable guests, including the Viscountess Chelsea, Viscount Newport, the Duke of Feria, actress Jameela Jamil, and others.

== Marriage and issue ==
On 8 September 2018, at St Mary Magdalene Church, Woodstock, Blandford married Camilla Elizabeth Antonia Thorp (b. 7 April 1987), now styled as Marchioness of Blandford. She is the eldest daughter of architect James Nicholas Thorp and interior designer Philippa Clare Thorp (née Thomas), of Drayton House, East Meon, Hampshire, and a descendant of the Tempest baronets.

Those attending the wedding included Lady Violet Manners, Lord and Lady Bamford, Andrew Parker-Bowles, and Lord Milford Haven.

They have two daughters and one son:

- Lady Olympia Arabella Kitty Spencer-Churchill (born 10 September 2020);
- Lady Leonora Eliza Cressida Spencer-Churchill (born 7 December 2024).
- Orlando Charles Godolphin Spencer-Churchill, Earl of Sunderland (born 15 April 2026).
