= Dorothy Kitson =

Wealthy London merchant and the builder of Hengrave Hall in Suffolk

- Born: c. 1531
- Died: 1576/1577
- Spouse(s): Sir Thomas Pakington; Thomas Tasburgh
- Children: Sir John Pakington; Henry Pakington; Robert Pakington; Thomas Pakington; Margaret Pakington; Katherine Pakington; Mary Pakington
- Parent(s): Sir Thomas Kitson, Margaret Donnington

Dorothy Kitson (c. 1531 – 1576/1577), later Dorothy, Lady Pakington, was the daughter of Sir Thomas Kitson, a wealthy London merchant and the builder of Hengrave Hall in Suffolk. Her first husband was Sir Thomas Pakington, by whom she was the mother of Queen Elizabeth I's favourite, Sir John "Lusty" Pakington. After Sir Thomas Pakington's death, she married Thomas Tasburgh. She was one of the few women in Tudor England to nominate burgesses to Parliament and to make her last will while her husband, Thomas Tasburgh, was still living. Her three nieces are referred to in the poems of Edmund Spenser.

== Family ==
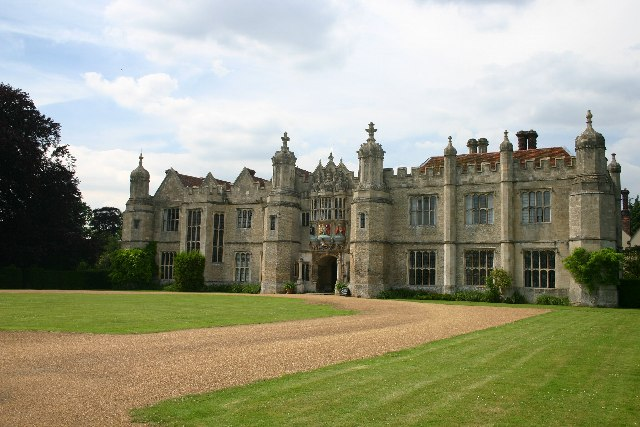
Hengrave Hall, built by Dorothy Kitson's father, Sir Thomas Kitson

Dorothy Kitson was the daughter of Sir Thomas Kitson by his second wife, Margaret Donnington (d. 12 January 1561), the only child of John Donnington (d. 1544) of Stoke Newington, a member of the Worshipful Company of Salters, and Elizabeth Pye. By her father's first marriage to a wife whose name is unknown she had a half sister, Elizabeth Kitson, who was the first wife of Edmund Croftes (d. 14 February 1558) of West Stow Hall in Little Saxham, Suffolk.

By her father's second marriage she had a brother and three sisters:

- Sir Thomas Kitson (1540–1603), who married firstly Jane Paget, the daughter of William Paget, 1st Baron Paget, by whom he had no issue, and secondly Elizabeth Cornwallis, the eldest daughter of Sir Thomas Cornwallis, by whom he had a son who died as an infant and two daughters, Margaret, who married Charles Cavendish (1553–1617), son of Bess of Hardwick and Sir William Cavendish, by whom she had no issue, and Mary, who married Thomas Darcy, 3rd Baron Darcy of Chiche.
- Katherine Kitson, who married Sir John Spencer (1524 – 8 November 1586) of Althorpe, Northamptonshire, and Wormleighton, Warwickshire, by whom she had four sons, John, Thomas, William and Richard, and six daughters. Among her daughters were Elizabeth Spencer, who married, in 1574, George Carey, 2nd Baron Hunsdon, eldest son of Queen Elizabeth's cousin, Henry Carey, 1st Baron Hunsdon; Anne Spencer, who in 1575 married William Stanley, 3rd Baron Monteagle (c.1529-1581), and in 1592 Robert Sackville, 2nd Earl of Dorset; and Alice Spenser, who in 1579 married Ferdinando Stanley, 5th Earl of Derby (c.1559-1594). The three Spencer sisters are referred to as 'Phyllis, Charillis, and sweet Amaryllis' in the poet Edmund Spenser's Colin Clout’s Come Home Again (1595).
- Frances Kitson, who married firstly John Bourchier, 5th Baron FitzWarin, eldest son of John Bourchier, 2nd Earl of Bath, by whom she had a son, William Bourchier, 3rd Earl of Bath, and secondly William Barnaby of Great Saxham, Suffolk.
- Anne Kitson, who married, as his first wife, Sir William Spring of Pakenham, Suffolk.

After Sir Thomas Kitson's death, Dorothy's mother, Margaret, married secondly Sir Richard Long (d.1546) of Wiltshire, Great Saxham and Shingay, Cambridgeshire, Gentleman of the Privy Chamber to King Henry VIII, by whom she had a son, Henry Long, and three daughters, Jane, Katherine and Mary. She married thirdly, in 1548, John Bourchier, 2nd Earl of Bath (d.1560), by whom she had two daughters, Susan and Bridget.

== Life ==
Dorothy Kitson required a dispensation to marry her first husband, Sir Thomas Pakington (died 2 June 1571) of Hampton Lovett, Worcestershire, the son of Robert Pakington (d.1536) and Agnes Baldwin. The dispensation was granted 20 September 1546.

Sir Thomas Pakington inherited the lordship of Aylesbury, Buckinghamshire, from his maternal grandfather, John Baldwin, Chief Justice of the Common Pleas. The nomination of Members of Parliament for the borough of Aylesbury was thus in Sir Thomas Pakington's control during his lifetime, and after his death Lady Dorothy, as his widow, 'exercised the full powers of lordship herself' by nominating Thomas Lichfield and George Burden to Parliament on 4 May 1572. As Carter points out, although Lady Dorothy's nomination was not unique, 'returns of MPs by widows were extremely rare in early modern England', and were of concern to the authorities, who were torn between their reluctance to allow widows to exercise this property right, and their reluctance to restrict property rights in any way, even in the case of widows.

Lady Dorothy's eldest son, Sir John Pakington, was for a time a favourite of Queen Elizabeth I, who invited him to court after he had been presented to her during her visit to Worcester in 1572.

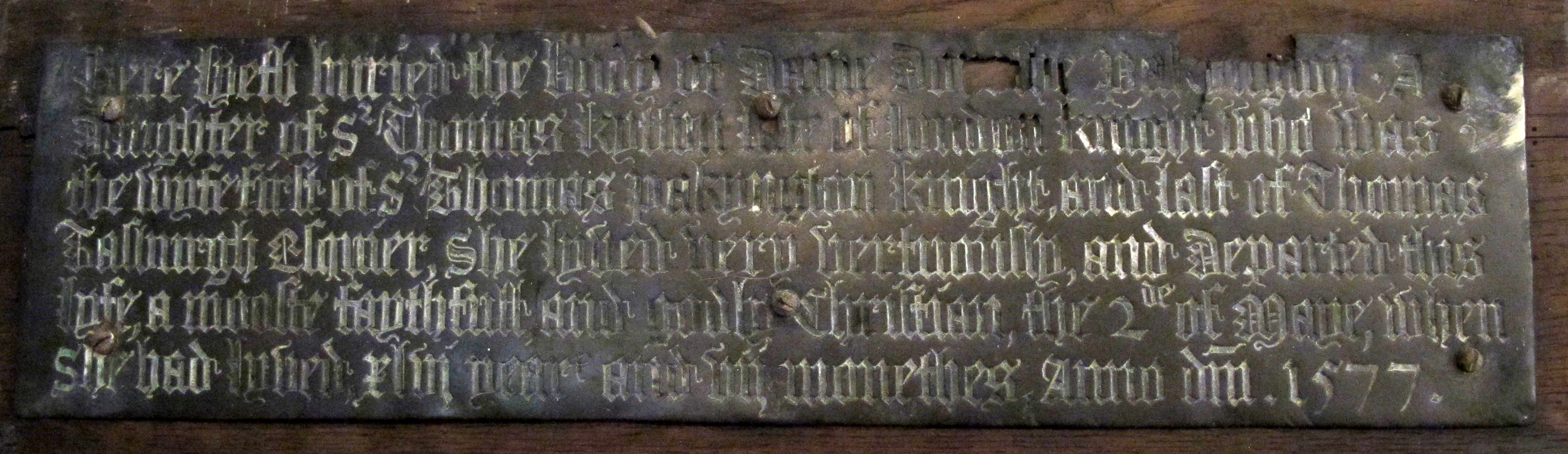
Dame Dorothy's memorial inscription at Hawridge, Buckinghamshire, 1577

In addition to being one of the few widows to nominate Members of Parliament, Lady Dorothy was also among the few women of the Tudor period to make a last will and testament while her husband was still living. Having obtained the consent of her second husband, Thomas Tasburgh, before taking this unusual step, she made her will on 30 April 1577. It was proved on 21 June 1577.

Lady Dorothy is buried in the parish church at Hawridge, where there is a monumental brass to her memory.

== Marriages and issue ==
Dorothy Kitson married firstly Sir Thomas Pakington (died 2 June 1571) of Hampton Lovett, Worcestershire. He was the son of Robert Pakington (d.1536), a London merchant who was shot to death on the morning of Monday 13 November 1536 while on his way to church. His murderer was never found. An account of his death, which was later interpreted as martyrdom, is given in John Foxe's Acts and Monuments.

Dorothy Kitson and Sir Thomas Pakington had four sons, Sir John Pakington, Henry, Robert and Thomas, who married Anne, the daughter of Sir William Pelham, and three daughters: Mary, who married, as his first wife, Sir Walter Long of Draycot, Wiltshire; (Note: Sir Walter Long's brother, Henry, was killed in the Longs' feud with the Danvers brothers, Charles and Henry.) Katherine, who married firstly John Davis, esquire, secondly Sir Jasper More, and thirdly a knight surnamed Mompesson; and Margaret, who married Thomas Lichfield, esquire, Gentleman of the Privy Chamber to Queen Elizabeth.

She married secondly Thomas Tasburgh (c.1554–c.1602) of Hawridge, Buckinghamshire, a lawyer and Teller of the Exchequer, by whom she had no issue.
