= Margaret Bourchier, Countess of Bath =

English noblewoman

Margaret Bourchier
- Countess of Bath
- Born: c. 1509
- Died: 20 December 1561
- Spouse(s): Thomas Kitson; Richard Long; John Bourchier, 2nd Earl of Bath
- Issue: Thomas Kitson; Katherine Kitson; Dorothy, Lady Pakington; Frances Kitson; Frances Kitson; Jane Long; Mary Long; Henry Long; Catherine Long; Lady Susanna Bourchier; Lady Bridget Bourchier
- Father: John Donington
- Mother: Elizabeth Pye

Margaret Bourchier, Countess of Bath (née Donington; c. 1509 – 20 December 1561) was an English Tudor noblewoman. She is notable for the three high-profile and advantageous marriages she secured during her lifetime, and for her success in arranging socially impressive marriages for many of her children. Through her descendants she is a common ancestor of many of the noble families of England.

Margaret was the only daughter and sole heiress of John Donington, a member of the Worshipful Company of Salters, and Elizabeth Pye. Through her first marriage she became the owner of Hengrave Hall, where she installed a tomb and stained glass window to the memory of her three husbands, who all predeceased her. She is buried in Hengrave Church.

== Marriages and issue ==
=== First marriage ===
Her first marriage was to Sir Thomas Kitson, a wealthy merchant and Sheriff of London, as his second wife. Together they had five children:

- Sir Thomas Kitson (1540–1603), who married firstly Jane Paget, the daughter of William Paget, 1st Baron Paget, by whom he had no issue, and secondly Elizabeth Cornwallis, the eldest daughter of Sir Thomas Cornwallis (d.1604), by whom he had a son who died as an infant and two daughters. From the daughters are descended the Dukes of Devonshire, the Dukes of Newcastle and the Earls Rivers.
- Katherine Kitson, who married Sir John Spencer (1524 – 8 November 1586), by whom she had four sons and six daughters. Their descendants include the Earls Spencer, the Dukes of Marlborough and the Barons Monteagle.
- Dorothy Kitson (1531–1577), who married firstly Sir Thomas Pakington (died 2 June 1571) by whom she had four sons, including Sir John Pakington and three daughters. Dorothy married secondly Thomas Tasburgh (c. 1554 – c. 1602) by whom she had no issue.
- Frances Kitson, who married firstly on 11 December 1548 her step-brother John Bourchier, Lord FitzWarin (who predeceased his father), eldest son of John Bourchier, 2nd Earl of Bath, by whom she had a son, William Bourchier, 3rd Earl of Bath, and secondly she married William Barnaby. Frances' descendants include the Earls of Stamford.
- Anne Kitson, who married, as his first wife, Sir William Spring. Their descendants include the Spring baronets.

Through this marriage Dame Margaret inherited extensive property, including Hengrave Hall in Suffolk.

=== Second marriage ===
Margaret's marriage to the courtier Sir Richard Long took place in 1540, a few months after the death of her first husband. The couple had four children:

- Jane Long (1541–1562)
- Mary Long (born 1543)
- Henry Long (1544–1573), godson of Henry VIII of England. He married Dorothy Clark, and their daughter, Elizabeth, married William Russell, 1st Baron Russell of Thornhaugh and is an ancestor of the Dukes of Bedford.
- Catherine Long (born 1546), married Edward Fisher in 1561.

=== Third marriage ===
Her final marriage was to John Bourchier, 2nd Earl of Bath on 11 December 1548, after which Margaret was styled Countess of Bath. Before the marriage she insisted that at the same time as her marriage to Bourchier, his son and heir, Lord FitzWarin, should marry her own daughter from her first marriage, Frances Kitson. The marriage settlement also ensured that Margaret retained control over her property. The Earl and Countess of Bath made Hengrave Hall their primary residence. The couple had two daughters:

- Lady Susanna Bourchier
- Lady Bridget Bourchier, who married Thomas Price.
