= Charles Cavendish (landowner, born 1553) =

English landowner and architect (1553–1617)

Sir Charles Cavendish (28 November 1553 – 4 April 1617) was an English landowner and architect. He was a son of Bess of Hardwick and William Cavendish (1505–1557).

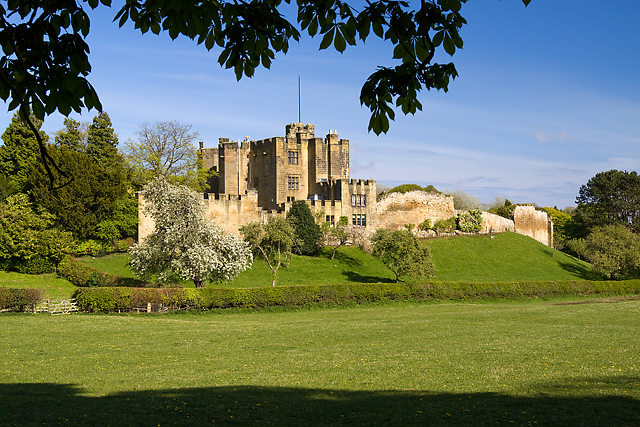
Bothal Castle, the Northumberland home of Charles Cavendish

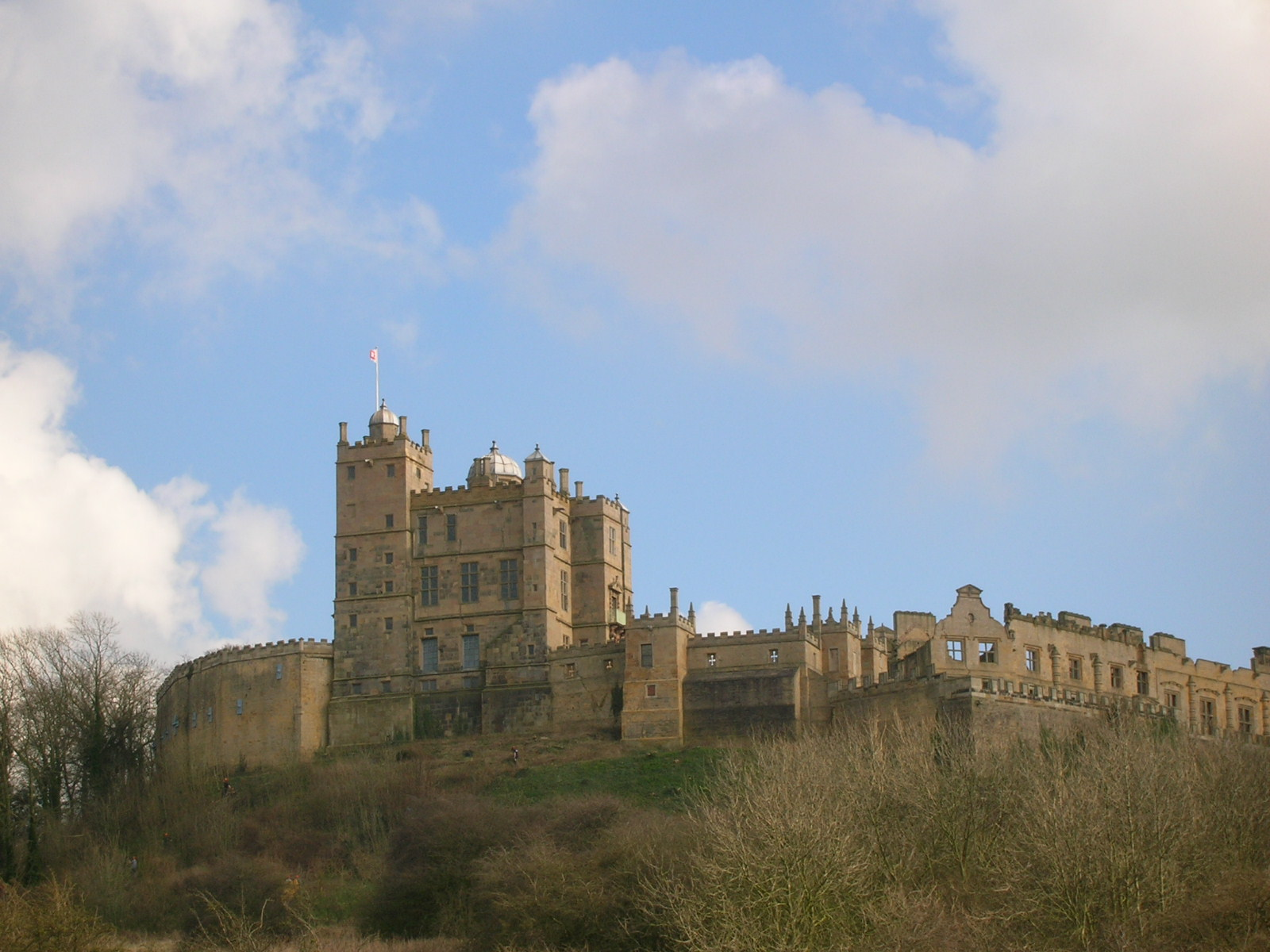
Bolsover Castle which Cavendish commenced rebuilding in 1613

== Career ==
Cavendish was educated at Eton and Clare College, Cambridge. He and his stepbrother Gilbert Talbot went on a Grand Tour to Venice in 1570 and to Rome in 1574.

In July 1582 he had some involvement with Mary, Queen of Scots, who declined his request. Mary claimed in March 1583 that Charles Cavendish, his brother William Cavendish, and Bess of Hardwick had tried to convince her that the Earl of Shrewsbury was her enemy. Mary said to William Waad that Cavendish had slandered her. Mary wrote in March 1584 that Charles Cavendish was in London, and had kept a pair of swift horses to ride to her with news of Elizabeth I's death, the English queen being unwell at this time.

He was knighted in 1583. Charles Cavendish wrote to his mother in 1587 describing life at court in London, the reception of Arbella Stuart, and building projects including work at Theobalds which he compared to Chatsworth.

The musician and composer John Wilbye dedicated The First Set of English Madrigals (London, 1598) to Cavendish who had married Margaret Kitson, a daughter of his patrons, the Kitsons of Hengrave. Wilbye commended Cavendish's skills as a musician. Wilbye dedicated the Second Set to Arbella Stuart.

Cavendish had a feud with the Stanhope family over issues including a fish weir in the River Trent. He arranged to fight a duel with John Stanhope at Lambeth choosing rapiers as the weapon. They came to Lambeth bridge by boat and it was discovered that Stanhope was wearing a sword-proof padded doublet. The fight was called off. In November 1599 Cavendish was shot in the backside while visiting Kirkby Hardwick, where he was repairing and extending the mansion. The house, also known as Sutton Hardwick, was finally demolished by the Coal Board in 1966. The site is close to Sutton Parkway railway station.

=== Bess of Hardwick and Arbella Stuart ===
In December 1607, Cavendish, the Earl of Shrewsbury and his sister, Mary Talbot, Countess of Shrewsbury, went to Hardwick Hall for a day to see Bess of Hardwick. Shrewsbury wrote he "found a lady of great years, of great wealth, and of a great wit, which yet still remains".

Arbella Stuart visited Sheffield and Hardwick after the death of Bess of Hardwick in 1608. Arbella wrote from Hardwick that Charles Cavendish was a pleasant companion, "I thinck I shall many times wish my selfe set [sat] by my cousin Charles at meales". In June 1611, Mary, Countess of Shrewsbury was imprisoned in the Tower of London for helping Arbella Stuart to escape. Cavendish wrote from Welbeck to Henry Butler, the Shrewsburys' steward at Sheffield with the encouraging news that the Countess had the comfortable "Queen's lodgings" with 3 or 4 rooms.

== Bolsover Castle ==
Cavendish discussed his buildings with the Earl and Countess of Shrewsbury, and sent them drawings that he developed after discussions with Lord Lumley's "inventor" or architect. The "inventor" provided Italianate designs with a hall and a small dining room called a "tenelli". The "tenelli" was unsuitable for an English earl, but fitting, said Cavendish, for an Italian gentleman who keeps only a pair of servants and eats only "salads and frogs, that yield little vapour."

Charles Cavendish acquired Bolsover Castle and Welbeck Abbey from Gilbert Talbot, 7th Earl of Shrewsbury in 1613. His accounts survive for building the early stages of the "Little Castle" at Bolsover. Unusually for this period female labour was recorded and the women's names or their husbands' names are given.

A design for the hall chimney, probably by John Smythson, drew on the published work of Sebastiano Serlio. Although the black-and-white marble fireplaces in Bolsover's "Little Castle" were installed after the death of Charles Cavendish, they were likely inspired by the publication of an English translation of Serlio's Architectura in 1611, possibly connecting the conception of Bolsover with an interest in Italian design at the court of Prince Henry.

Charles, or his brother William Cavendish welcomed King James at Bothal Castle on 5 May 1617. The king stayed for two nights, then went on to Alnwick Abbey, the home of Francis Brandling, on his way to Scotland.

Charles Cavendish died in 1617 and was buried at Bolsover. His son built the monument to his parents in St Mary and St Laurence's Church, Bolsover.

== Marriages and family ==
Cavendish married two heiresses. He married his first wife Margaret Kitson on 6 February 1580, a daughter of Thomas Kitson of Hengrave Hall and Elizabeth Cornwallis. Thomas Kitson was a son of Thomas Kitson and Margaret Donnington. She died in childbirth in 1583 giving birth to a son called Charles. Bess of Hardwick had negotiated the marriage in 1580 via her son-in-law Gilbert Talbot who held discussions with Sir Thomas Cornwallis on details of the contract, instructed by letters from Bess.

The architectural historian Mark Girouard draws a parallel between the plan of Hengrave Hall and Barlborough Hall built in the 1580s for Bess of Hardwick's lawyer, Francis Rodes, and a later-unexecuted plan for a house at Slingsby for Charles Cavendish. The similarity is a corridor running around the internal courtyard.

Charles Cavendish married Catherine Ogle (d. 1627), daughter of Cuthbert, 7th Lord Ogle, Baron Ogle, in 1592. She was the heiress and brought Bothal Castle to Cavendish. Their children included:

- William Cavendish, 1st Duke of Newcastle (1593–1676)
- Charles Cavendish (1594–1654)
