= Thomas Kitson (died 1603) =

English landowner

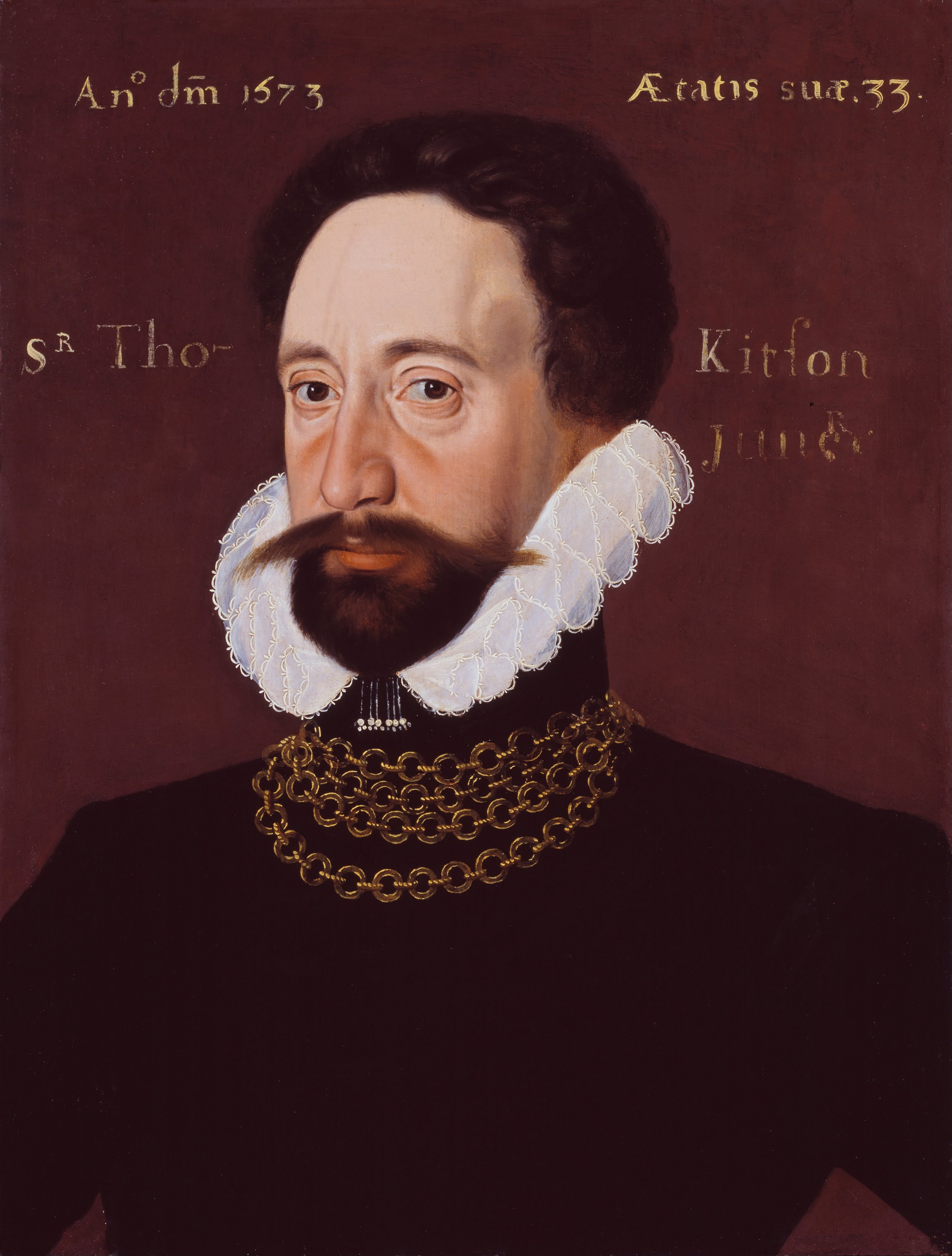
Sir Thomas Kitson, by George Gower, Tate Gallery

Sir Thomas Kitson or Kytson (1540–1603) was an English landowner.

He was the sole and posthumous son of Thomas Kitson of Hengrave Hall and his second wife Margaret Donnington (d. 1561).

== Career ==
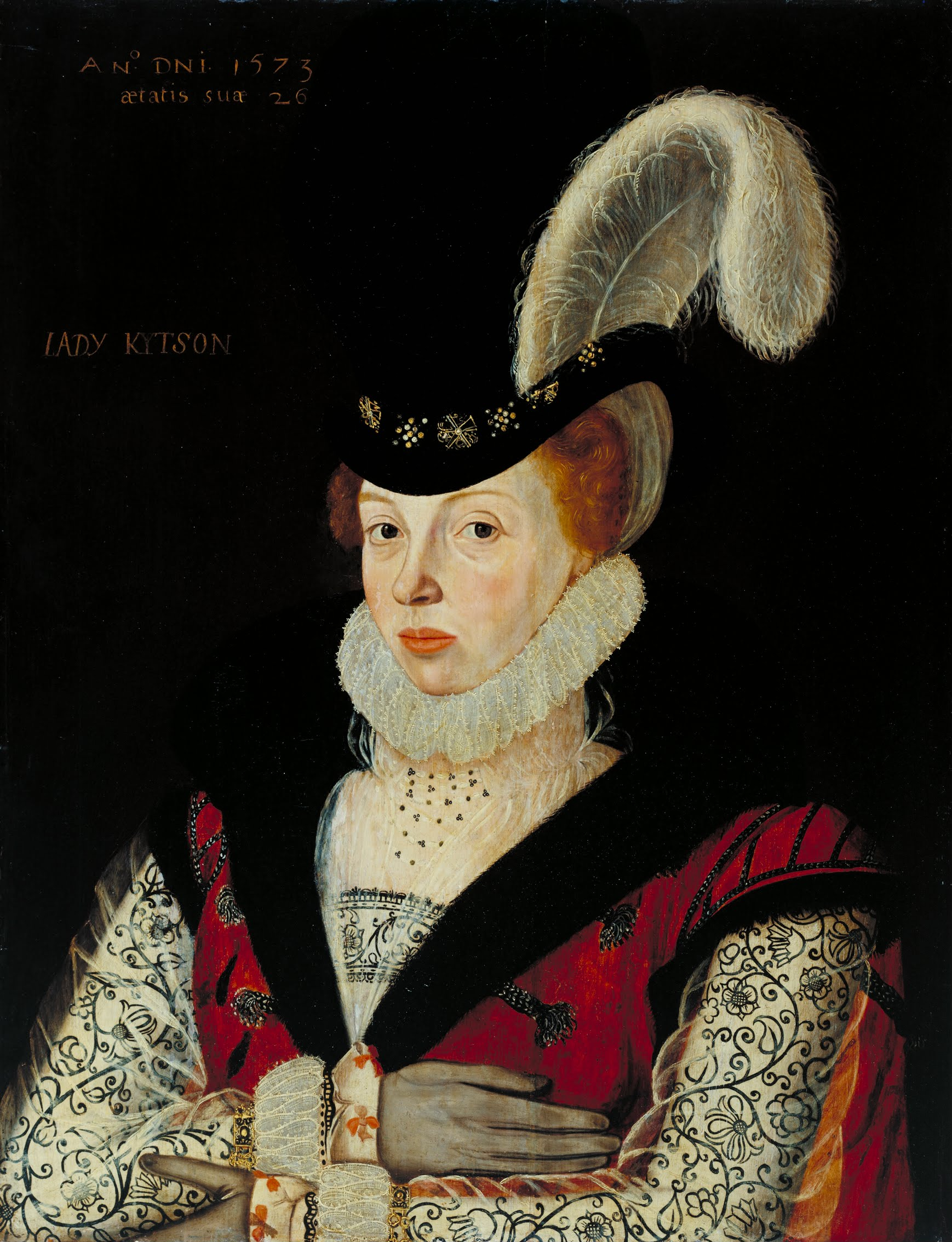
Elizabeth Kitson née Cornwallis, wife of Thomas Kitson, (1573) by George Gower, Tate Gallery

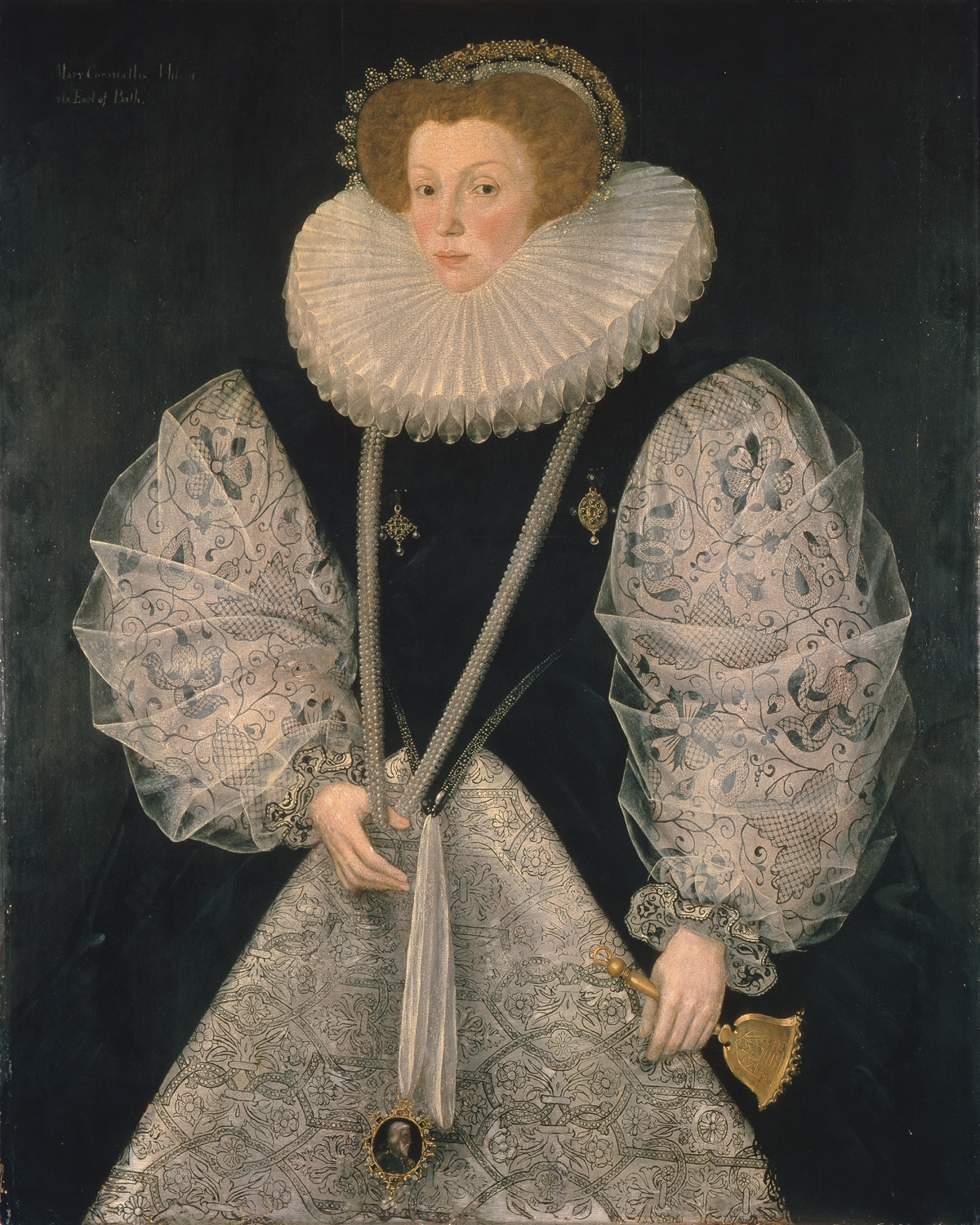
Mary Cornwallis, disputed Countess of Bath, attrib. George Gower, Manchester Art Gallery

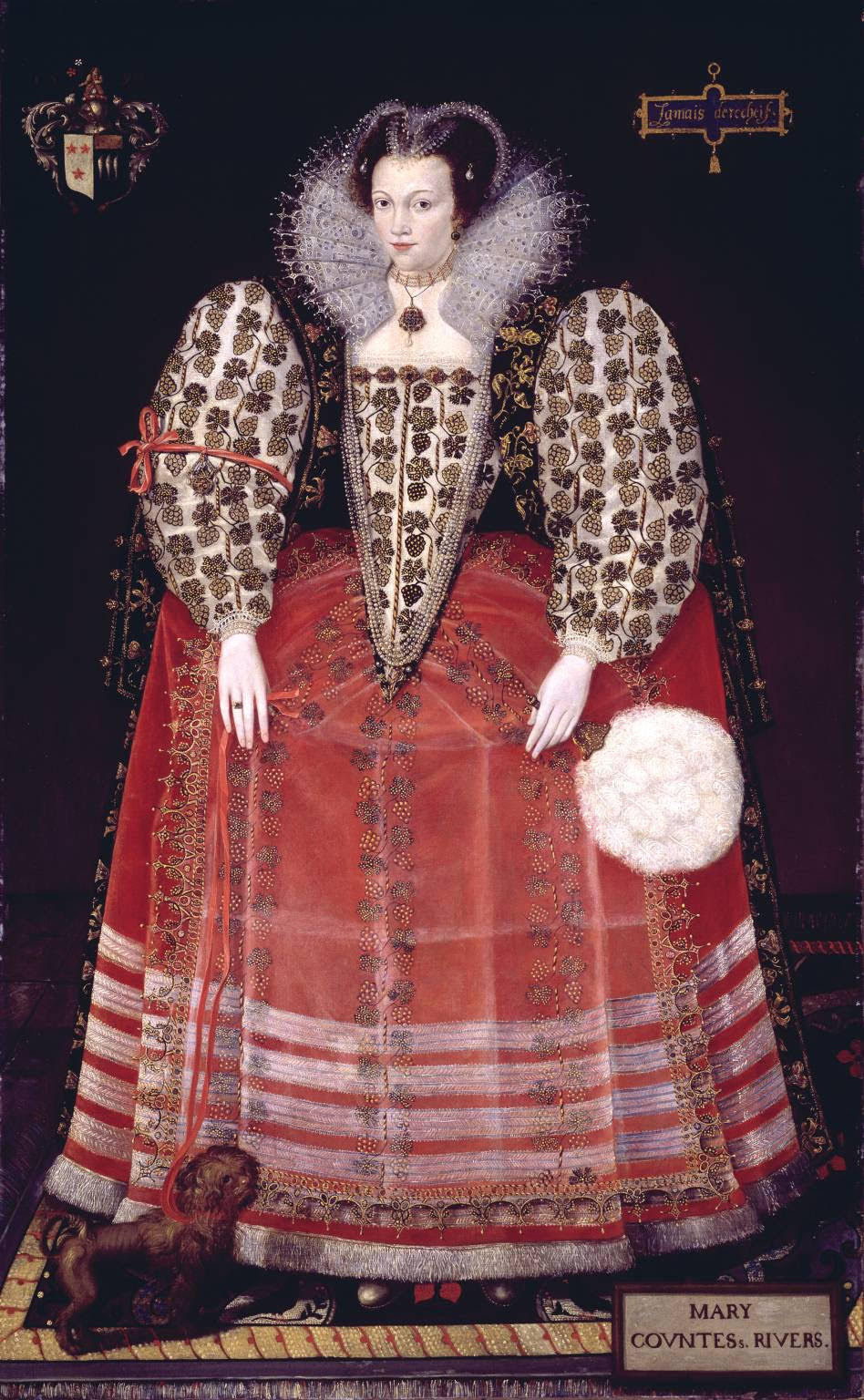
Mary Kitson, Countess Rivers, c. 1590

He was born shortly after the death of his father. His mother died in 1561 and left him £200 worth of silver plate, his father's best gold chain and turquoise ring, and fifteen pieces of tapestry that had belonged to her third husband, the Earl of Bath. She also left him household goods and arms and armour at Hengrave and Chevington, and the farmstock. In 1603, the Great Chamber at Hengrave was hung with 15 pieces of tapestry, of "park work" featuring "great beasts and fowls", probably representing his mother's bequest, with two further pieces hanging over the chimney pieces, one woven with the Kitson and Cornwallis arms in the border.

His sister Dorothy's first husband Thomas Pakington died in 1571, and he wrote to her, offering to help with legal issues concerning her jointure property, ready to "performe the dutye of a frend and naturall love of a brother".

Kitson and his second wife Elizabeth Cornwallis were patrons of the madrigalist John Wilbye and the composer Edward Johnson. He bought a pair of virginals in London in 1575 and hired a musician called Cosen to teach their daughters to play. Meg and Mary Kitson enjoyed a card game called "maw".

He paid the artist George Gower £5 for five pictures in August 1573. Two portraits, of Thomas Kitson and his wife Elizabeth, survive today at the Tate Gallery. In July 1574, he was entertained at Hengrave by Lord Leicester's players and a dancing bear. In August he had his timber-framed London House in Coleman Street plastered and white-washed and the beams painted black.

Queen Elizabeth stayed at Hengrave in August 1578.

According to Thomas Churchyard, at Hengrave, "the fare and banquet did so exceed a number of other places that it is worthy the mention. A show representing the fairies, as well as might be, was there seen: in the which show a rich jewel was presented to the Queen's Highness".

== Mary Cornwallis' marriage ==
In 1577 his nephew, William Bourchier, 3rd Earl of Bath, a student at Cambridge visited him at Hengrave. Kitson persuaded him to marry his wife's sister, Mary Cornwallis (d. 1627), without consulting his parents. This match was perceived as advantageous to the Kitsons of Hengrave. William returned to Cambridge and told his tutor. His mother Frances, Lady FitzWarin arrived at College and argued with him. Despite being a Kitson, she was very angry and banished him from her home, thinking he could have married the daughter of a great aristocrat.

In 1581 an inquest was made into the validity of the marriage. Mary, Countess of Bath, resisted this but the marriage was declared invalid. Soon after the Earl of Bath married Elizabeth Russell, a daughter of the Earl of Bedford. Libel poems circulated, describing the actions of Thomas Kitson in arranging Mary Cornwallis' marriage as deceitful, claiming she had a child by Francis Southwell before the clandestine marriage. Thomas Kitson continued to assert that Mary Cornwallis was the rightful Countess of Bath and made a statement in her favour in his will.

The poet Francis Davison joined the controversy opposing Mary Cornwallis and Thomas Kitson and circulated a pamphlet, Answer to Mrs Mary Cornwallis Pretended Countess of Bath's Libel Against the Countess of Cumberland. Manchester Art Gallery has a portrait of Mary Cornwallis. The marriage at Hengrave was called an "untimely marriage by night" in a letter of 1596.

The scandal does not seem to have hampered the marriage negotiations of Thomas Kitson's own daughters. Bess of Hardwick wrote in January 1581 that her son Charles "is to joyne with so good frendes" and Margaret Kitson had a "vertuous demeanure".

Elizabeth Kitson went to court at Greenwich Palace in April 1583. Her expenses were recorded by the Hengrave steward Thomas Fryer. Their daughter Mary married Lord Darcy in April. She was bought jewels, ruffs, partlets, embroidered smocks, and a nightgown faced with black velvet.

== Marriages and family ==
His first wife was Jane Paget, a daughter of William Paget, 1st Baron Paget. Her brother Thomas Paget was married to Nazareth Newton, a lady in waiting. Thomas and Jane had no children.

His second wife was Elizabeth Cornwallis (d. 1628), the eldest daughter of Sir Thomas Cornwallis (d. 1604). She had been an attendant of Margaret Audley, Duchess of Norfolk. Their children included:

- Margaret (Meg) Kitson (d. 1583), who married Sir Charles Cavendish (1553–1617) in 1582. He was a son of Sir William Cavendish and Bess of Hardwick. Bess of Hardwick negotiated the marriage in 1581 via her son-in-law Gilbert Talbot who held discussions with Sir Thomas Cornwallis on details of the contract, instructed by letters from Bess. Bess kept a picture of "Sir Charles his first wyfe" in her withdrawing chamber at Hardwick Hall. The architectural historian Mark Girouard draws a parallel between the plan of Hengrave Hall and Barlborough Hall built in the 1580s for Bess of Hardwick's lawyer, Francis Rodes, and a later unexecuted plan for a house at Slingsby for Charles Cavendish. The similarity is a corridor running around the internal courtyard.
- Mary Kitson, who married Thomas Darcy, 3rd Baron Darcy of Chiche. They separated in 1594. Her son Thomas Darcy (d. 1614) was a page to Prince and performed at the tournament Prince Henry's Barriers in January 1610. An inventory of her possessions made in 1644 includes portraits of her parents. In a portrait aged 17 in 1583 she hold gloves. Her portrait of 1617 shows her with elbow akimbo and the motto, "If Not, I Care Not" on a paper in her hand. A miniature portrait has an inscription from Psalm 27 engraved in its case in Latin, "for unjust witnesses have risen up against me; and iniquity hath lied to itself".

== Death ==
Thomas Kitson died at Hengrave on 28 January 1603 and was buried on 2 March at Hengrave church. His monument depicts him in armour with his two wives under a free-standing canopy.
