= John Wilbye =

English composer (1574–1638)

John Wilbye (baptized 7 March 1574 – September 1638) was an English madrigal composer.

== Early life and education ==
The son of a tanner, he was born at Brome, Suffolk, England. (Brome is near Diss, Norfolk.)

== Career ==
Wilbye received the patronage of the Cornwallis family of Brome Hall.

Wilbye was employed for decades at Hengrave Hall, near Bury St Edmunds, where he seems to have been recruited in the 1590s by Elizabeth Kitson who was married to the property's owner, Sir Thomas Kitson (or Kytson). The Kitsons also had a long association with the composer Edward Johnson, who was more than twenty years older than Wilbye, and began working at Hengrave in the 1570s.

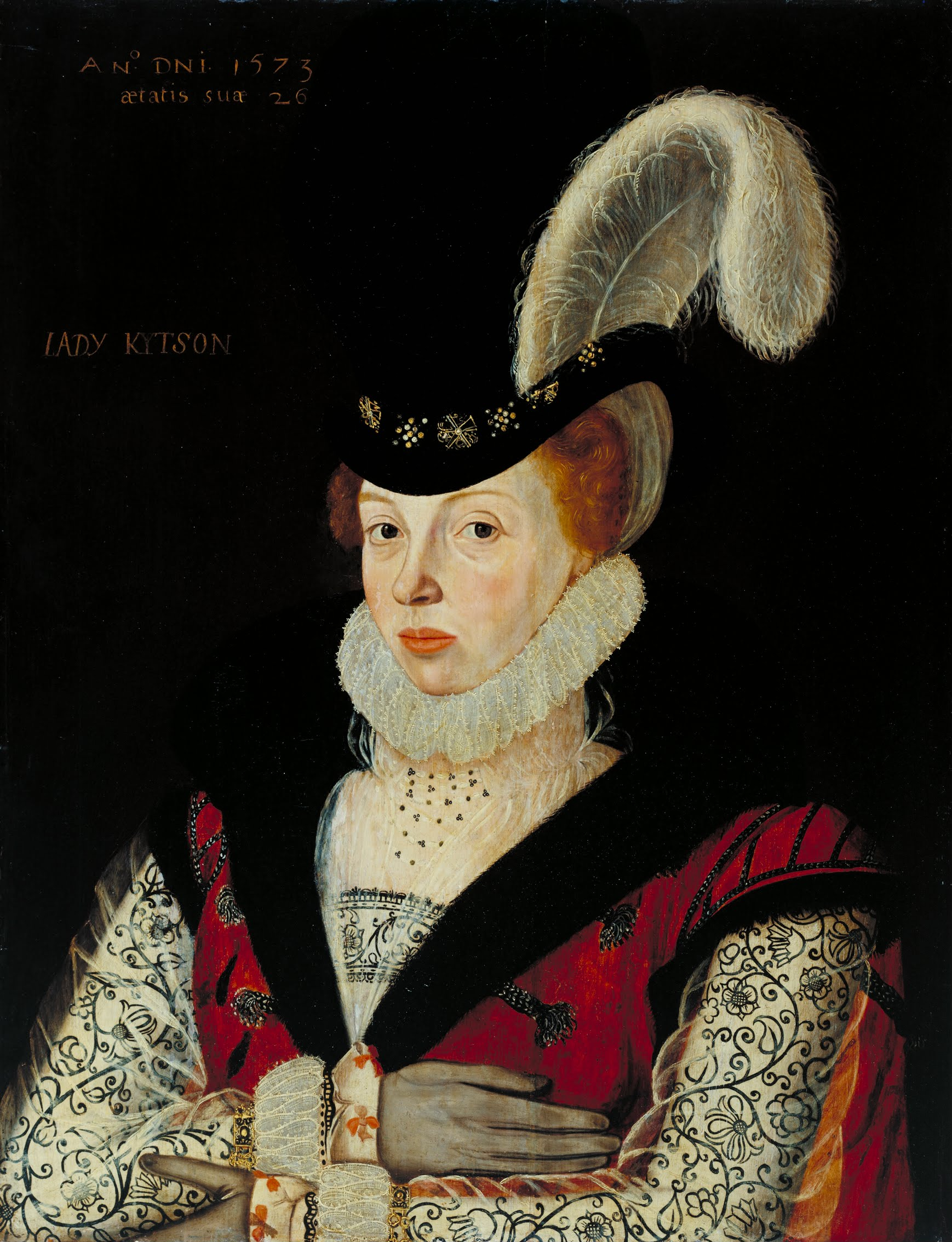
Wilbye's patron Elizabeth Kitson née Cornwallis. Painted in 1573, the year before Wilbye's birth, by George Gower

As well as working in Suffolk, Wilbye was involved with the music scene in London, where the Kitsons kept a town house (first in Austin Friars and from about 1601 in Clerkenwell). His first book of madrigals was published in London in 1598. The 30 madrigals are described as "newly composed". The publication was dedicated to Sir Charles Cavendish, whose first wife had been a Kitson.

Wilbye remained in contact with his printer Thomas East. In 1600 Wilbye and Edward Johnson took on a proofreading job for East, the first edition of Dowland's Second Book of Songs, as Dowland was abroad. East died in 1608, and Wilbye's second book of madrigals, containing 31 works, was printed the following year by East's nephew Thomas Snodham who had served an apprenticeship under his uncle.

== Compositions ==
Hengrave was a recusant household, but little religious music by Wilbye survives, and even less keyboard music (one piece in Clement Matchett's Virginal Book). His main interest seems to have been madrigals. A set of madrigals by him appeared in 1598, and a second in 1608, the two sets containing sixty-four pieces.

Wilbye is probably the most famous of all the English madrigalists; his pieces have long been favourites and are often included in modern collections. His style is characterized by delicate writing for the voice, acute sensitivity to the text and the use of "false relations" between the major and minor modes.

=== Notable Works ===
- Weep, weep mine eyes
- Weep, O mine eyes
- Draw on, sweet night
- Love not me for comely grace (a poem)

== Personal life ==
Wilbye never married. In 1628, on Lady Kitson's death, all the furnishings, books, and musical instruments at Hengrave Hall were settled by her will upon the new owners of the house, first on her daughter Mary Darcy and then upon her granddaughter Penelope. However, Wilbye left Hengrave to live in retirement at Mary Darcy's house in Colchester, where he died. He is buried in the graveyard of Holy Trinity Church, in Colchester town centre.
