= Thomas Tasburgh =

Member of the Parliament of England

Thomas Tasburgh (c. 1553 – c. 1602), originally of South Elmham, Suffolk, afterwards of Hawridge and latterly of Beaconsfield and Twyford, Buckinghamshire, was a member of the English landed gentry, a magistrate, member of parliament, High Sheriff of Buckinghamshire, and officer of the Exchequer to Queen Elizabeth I.

Although Thomas Tasburgh was not himself a Catholic recusant, his second marriage (to Jane West) brought him into a wide sphere of Catholic kinship and association, and some considerable debts. Jane's daughter Lettice, who married Thomas's nephew, John Tasburgh (V) of Flixton Hall, shaped the future Catholicism of the Tasburgh family.

== Origins ==
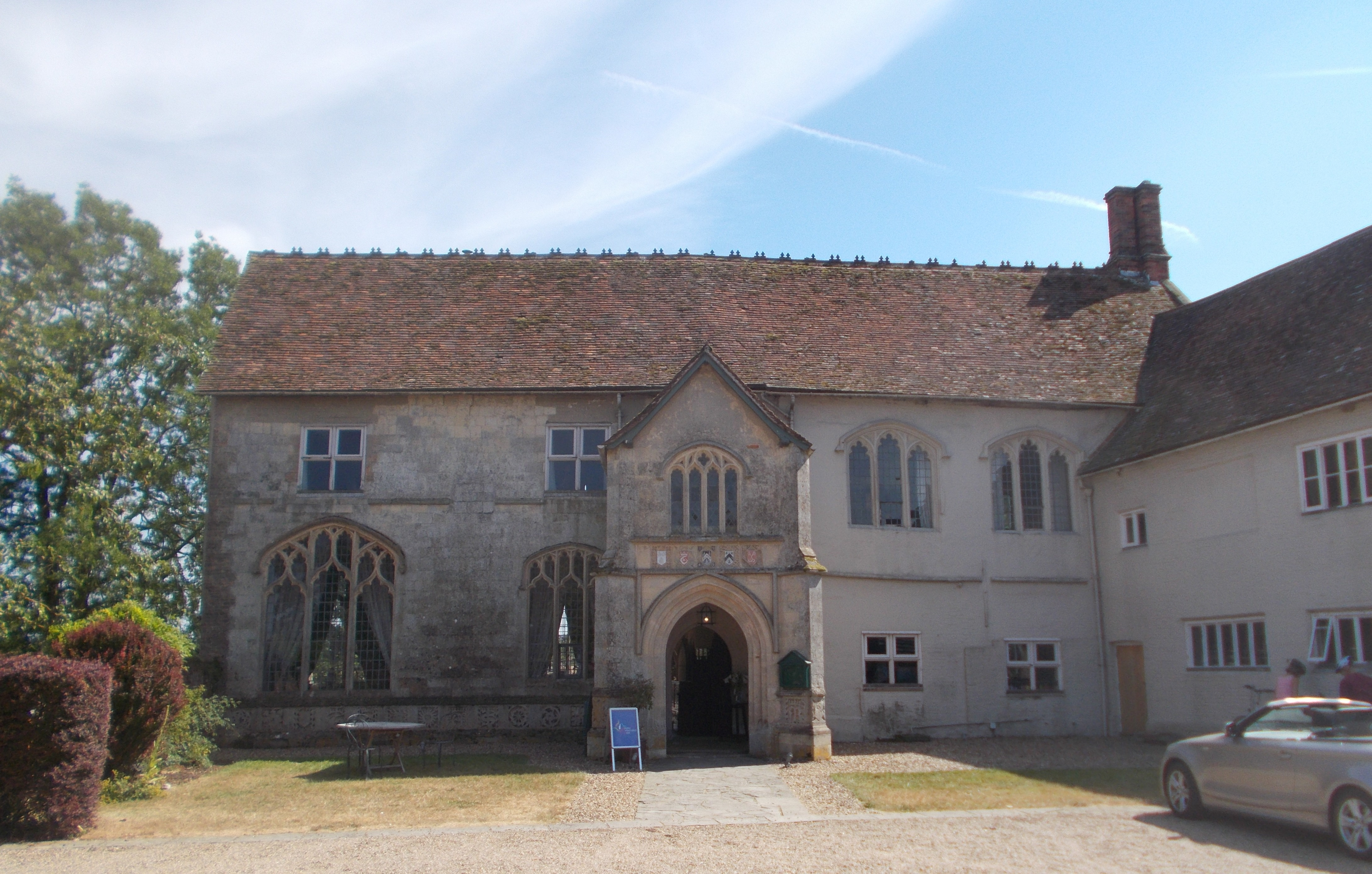
The Tasburgh residence at St Peter's Hall, South Elmham, thought to represent a remodelling of the 1530s for John Tasburgh III

The father of Thomas Tasburgh, John Tasburgh (III; c. 1495–1552) of Flixton, represented a family which took its name from the village of Tasburgh in south Norfolk, but, settling at St Peter South Elmham and at Flixton in north Suffolk and with mercantile interests in Norwich, became established by intermarriage with other gentry families. John (III) was the son of John Tasburgh (II; died 1509) and his wife, Olyve, daughter of John Everard of Cratfield and his wife, Margaret Bedyngfield, of Ditchingham.

In addition to his Everard cousins, by his maternal aunt Anne (or Agnes) Everard, John (III) became the nephew of Sir Edward Echyngham of Barsham in north Suffolk, and therefore the cousin of Anne Echyngham, wife of Sir Owen Hopton of Cockfield Hall, Yoxford, and of her sister Mary, wife of John Blennerhassett of Frenze and Barsham.

John Tasburgh (III), who purchased the site of Flixton Priory and settled there, made two marriages, first (in 1524) to Alice Dybney of Garboldisham, by whom he had sons John, Owen and William Tasburgh, and secondly to Elizabeth, daughter of John Davy of Norwich. Thomas Tasburgh was the son of this second marriage, and may have been born after the death of his father. He is not mentioned in his father's will (proved 1554), but began in life at least at Flixton, where his mother Elizabeth (his father's sole executor) held the two manors of Flixton late Priory and Flixton Boyse as, or with, her jointure estate.

As administrator, Elizabeth Tasburgh faced suits for her husband's debts, and she soon remarried to Francis Clovell, Armiger, of Cloville Hall (Fullers) in West Hanningfield, Essex, and now of South Elmham. Clovell became embroiled in lawsuits with the family concerning the Flixton estates, and by early 1563 was dead: by 1565 Elizabeth was again remarried, to a gentleman of Norfolk who on behalf of Clovell's executor agreed that John Tasburgh should keep whatever goods belonging to Clovell remained in Suffolk.

John Tasburgh (IV), the eldest of Thomas's half-brothers, had meanwhile held his first manorial court at Flixton and, following Elizabeth's death by 1567, paid to Thomas an annuity of 20 marks as from October 1568. Thomas was educated at Gray's Inn in London.

== First marriage ==
Tasburgh first married Dorothy (née Kitson) (1531–1577), who was the daughter of Sir Thomas Kitson (1485–1540) (builder of Hengrave Hall, Suffolk) by his second wife, Margaret Donnington, and was the widow of Sir Thomas Pakington (died 2 June 1571) of Hampton Lovett, Worcestershire.

Tasburgh thus became the stepfather of Sir John Pakington (1549–1625), called "Lusty Pakington", a favourite in the royal court, though being in fact slightly younger than him. Dorothy Pakington gained notoriety in 1572, after her first husband's death, for assuming his authority as "lord and owner of the town of Aylesbury" to appoint the town's two burgesses by her own writ. Tasburgh acquired Hawridge in Buckinghamshire as the result of a conveyance by Thomas Penyston to John Wolmer and John Davy in 1574, preliminary to its alienation to himself and to his wife Dorothy. There was no surviving issue of this marriage.

Dame Dorothy made a will, with her husband's permission, dated 30 April 1577. She was buried at Hawridge, where her memorial was a stone ledger slab with heraldic escutcheons and a brass plate memorial inscription. Only one of the three escutcheons survives, which shows the heraldry for Dorothy's parents, Kitson (dexter) impaling a quartering for Donnington (sinister). The inscription reads:

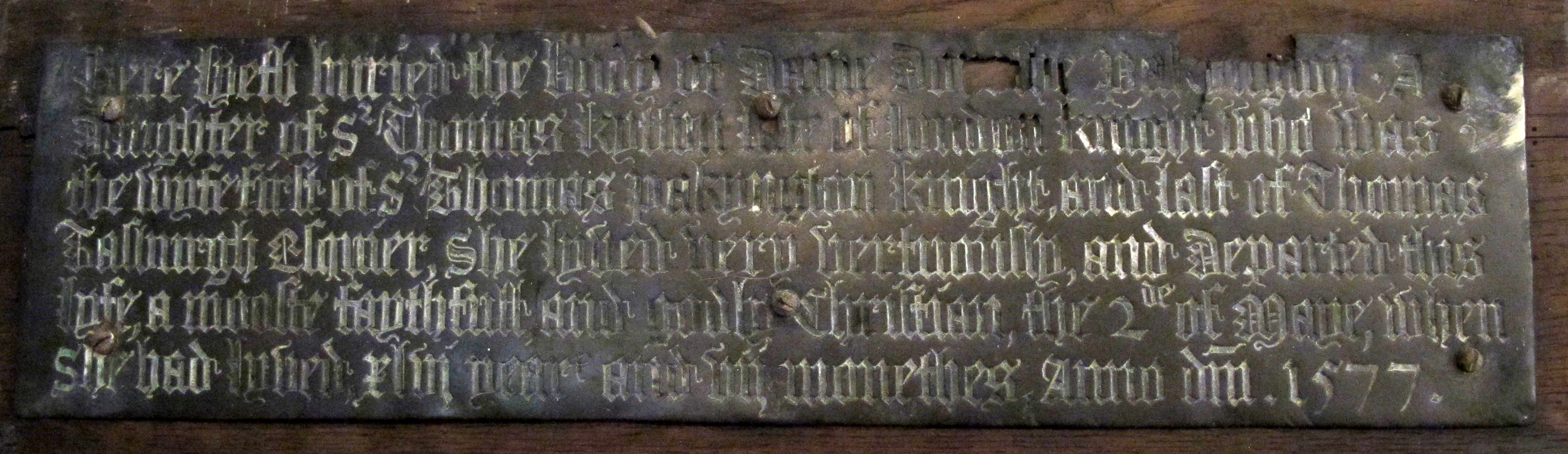
Memorial inscription of Dame Dorothy at Hawridge church, 1577

"Here lyeth buried the body of Dame Dorothie Pakyngton, A daughter of Sr Thomas Kytson late of London knight who was the wyfe first of Sr Thomas Pakyngton knyght, and last of Thomas Tasburgh Esquier, She lyved very vertuously and departed this lyfe, a mooste faythfull and godly Christian, the 2de of Maye, when she had lyved xlvj yeares and vij monethes, Anno dni. 1577."

Following the death of his first wife, Tasburgh served as a Justice of the Peace for Buckinghamshire from 1579 and was pricked High Sheriff of Buckinghamshire for 1581–82. He was elected a Member of Parliament for Aylesbury in 1584 and 1586, and for Buckinghamshire in 1588.

== Second marriage ==
He married secondly, on 16 January 1587/88 at Twyford, Buckinghamshire, Jane West, daughter of William West, 1st Baron De La Warr, and widow successively of Thomas Wenman (or Waynman), Esquire of Thame Park, Oxfordshire and Twyford (died 1577), and of James Cressy of Beaconsfield (died 1581). Tasburgh's friend and kinsman Sir John Pakington is said to have been one of the few people present at the wedding. The Wenmans were Catholic sympathizers: Thomas Wenman's mother was the eldest daughter of Lord Williams of Thame (c. 1500–1559). It is told that Cressy was a retainer to Lord De La Warr and sought to marry Jane, but her father forbade the marriage: Cressy went abroad and was converted to Catholicism, and when he returned he married her as a widow and converted her. Jane brought offspring from both of her previous marriages, but for Tasburgh his second marriage was again without issue.

Through this union Tasburgh acquired other manors, including the Wenman manor of Twyford, and that of Wilton in Beaconsfield, which James Cressy had leased under promise to pay the Wenman debts to the Crown, and which now became the Tasburgh marital home. In 1590 Thomas and Jane laid claim upon Sir John Danvers of Dauntsey for the manor of Eaton Hastings in Berkshire, as having been devised to Jane as jointure by Sir Richard Wenman (died 1573), her former father-in-law: proceedings ensued in the Star Chamber until 1594. Danvers had agreed to purchase the manor for a considerable sum, most of which had been laid out at the time of James Cressy's death in 1581–82, but the manor had not been conveyed to Danvers. The Wenman debts were now coming home to roost for Tasburgh: however, Danvers died in 1594.

== Later career ==
He sat in parliament for Chipping Wycombe in 1593. A Recusant Roll of 1592-93 shows that part of Thomas's estates had been seized and were being farmed by the Crown. In 1595 he was questioned over threats he had made to his neighbour at Beaconsfield. He replied that his neighbour had slandered him and his wife by saying that they were maintainers of popery, and had been married by a priest. The neighbour apologised but said that he could not rule his wife's tongue, and that she was agitated against Tasburgh and another magistrate because they had called her husband to account for his running of a victualling house. Tasburgh showed that he had been married at Twyford by the minister there. He also denied possessing superstitious crosses.

Having no male heir of their own bodies together, Thomas and Jane Tasburgh found an heir in their nephew John Tasburgh (V) (son of John Tasburgh (IV) of Flixton, Suffolk). In 1597 John (V) married Lettice Cressy, daughter of Jane's second marriage, and it was on that occasion that they alienated Hawridge to him. The Statutes against recusancy were becoming increasingly severe, and (in the face of accusations) it may have seemed needful to escape the risk of forfeiture or limitations on the bequest of property. Thomas's brother John (IV), father of the nephew John, was of more Puritan leanings, and the gift was made under the arrangement that he should pay an annuity of £120 to Thomas and his wife in exchange for it: this was not at once forthcoming, and led to a Chancery suit. As Thomas sat in Parliament for Aylesbury once more in 1597, his nephew John took his place for Chipping Wycombe, and in the following year Thomas was appointed one of the four Tellers of the Exchequer.

In May 1599 he went to Dublin where, on 9 May, he was knighted by the Earl of Essex. The Queen was displeased by his going there, and upon his return to England he was imprisoned. Three letters survive from Tasburgh to Sir Robert Cecil, all asking for his intervention with the queen. By his own account, he had gone with Lord La Warr "to bring the Earl of Essex on his journey", not at first intending to travel further than Cheshire. Having proceeded there, the Earl had persuaded him to remain longer than he expected. On 19 May, still at large, he writes that he had been coming to bring Lord Dunkellie's compliments to Sir Robert, but durst not come to court because of the queen's displeasure, and begs that the queen remember his near 30 years of faithful service to her.

On 26 May, from captivity, he has heard ("from Mr Bowyer, my neighbour and enemy") that the queen proposed to deprive him of his office (which is in good order and not neglected), which she had recently granted to him in lieu of a large sum of money owing to him. He begs Sir Robert that he shall not be disgraced in this way, since Her Majesty has his estates and the names of his securities, and protests that he did not seek the degree which the Earl had bestowed on him: he had, indeed, received the Earl's assurance that it was the queen's intention he should bestow it. On 26 June, still incarcerated, he thanks Sir Robert for having spoken to the queen. He mentions that the queen had promised him protection when he had told her that he would gain many enemies for obeying a command which she had given to him. He refers to a sum of £6,500 which should have been due to him, and objects that he is being asked to place his information in the hands of "The Lady Carie, mine adversary". Both letters from captivity are endorsed with lists of names. Tasburgh retained his position in the Exchequer until his death in the winter of 1602/03.

== Patronage ==
In 1602, the poet William Basse published his Three Pastoral Elegies with a dedication to "The Honourable and Virtuous Lady, the Lady Tasburgh". It is believed that Basse had been a servant in the Wenman household. The tenour of the pastorals is that the speaker is a shepherd boy (Anetor) who has been taken under the wing of a courtly young man Anander, whom he greatly admires. Anander, who pines with love for a lady, sends the boy as a go-between to make his declaration to the lady Muridella, who is of surpassing beauty and virtue. In the most gracious fashion the lady declines the offered love, but in so doing arouses a passionate devotion in the heart of the messenger. There is a keynote alluding to Finance in the poet's dedicatory address:

"If your Ladyship hath not before this time very iustly expected the best office of my Muse, it is now time for me to be voluntarily ashamed, that you should so long forbeare the vse of so many honourable encouragements. But (alas) finding my abilitie too little to make the meanest satisfaction of so great a Principall as is due to so many fauourable curtesies, I am bold to tender your Ladyship this unworthy Interest, wherewithall I will put in good securitie, that assoone as Time shall relieue the necessitie of my young inuention, I will disburse my Muse to the uttermost mite of my power, to make some more acceptable composition with your bounty: In the meane space, liuing without hope to be euer sufficient inough to yeeld your Worthinesse the smallest halfe of your due, I doe onely desire to leaue your Ladyship in assurance,

That when encrease of Age and Learning, sets
My Minde in wealthi'r state then now it is,
I'll pay a greater portion of my debts,
Or mortgage you a better Muse then this,
Till then, no kinde forbearance is amisse,
While, though I owe more then I can make good,
This is inough, to shew how faine I woo'd.

Your Ladiships in all humblenes,

Willam Bas.

== Death and legacy ==
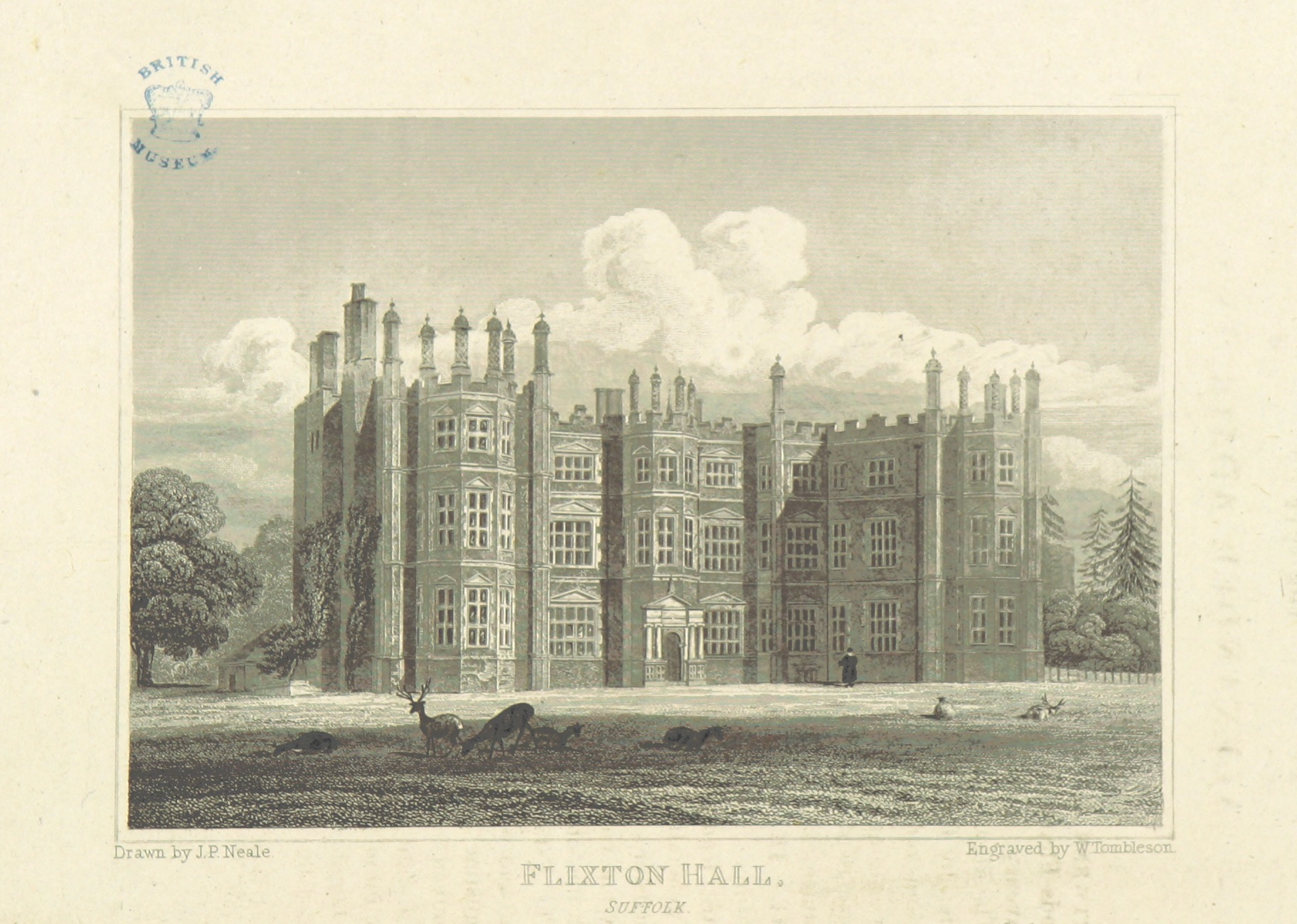
North front of Flixton Hall, built c. 1615 for Sir John Tasburgh (V), as it appeared before reconstruction during the 1840s

At his death, which occurred suddenly early in 1603, he was buried in the old church of St Andrew's, Holborn in London, in the Ward of Farringdon Without. Sir Thomas Tasburgh was shown to have been indebted in considerable sums (£2,530) to the Crown upon the remainder of his account for his office as Teller. Hawridge was further demised to John Tasburgh in Thomas's will. In 1605, in the wake of the Gunpowder Plot, Lady Tasburgh stirred up a hornets' nest by disclosing potentially treasonable correspondence of Elizabeth Vaux, and concerning correspondence between Sir George Fermor and Lady Wenman, resulting in various interrogations. At this time the severe statutes of the Popish Recusants Act 1605 were introduced.

In November 1611 Thomas Tasburgh's twenty-two sureties were listed, headed by Henry Wyndsore, 5th Baron Wyndsore, Sir William Brydges, 4th Baron Chandos and Sir William Pope of Wroxton, later 1st Earl of Downe (sons-in-law of Owen and Anne Hopton), Sir Thomas Kitson, Sir John Peyton, Lieutenant of the Tower, Richard Blount (II) of Dedisham in Slinfold (married to Jane West's sister Mary), Richard Fermor of Somerton, etc.: Dame Jane was permitted to compound, with the assistance of Sir John Tasburgh of Flixton and of Richard Blennerhassett of Kelvedon. Sir John (V) was the builder of Flixton Hall in 1615, which was rebuilt by Anthony Salvin in the later 1840s following a "disastrous" fire.

Around 1605 Dame Jane married, as her fourth husband, that notable adherent to the Old Faith, Ralph Sheldon (1537–1613), Esquire, of Beoley, Worcestershire, whose first wife had been Anne Throckmorton. Sheldon still referred to her as "Lady Jane Tasborough", and the date of the marriage is established by its mention in a suit between Sheldon and Sir William Roper of Eltham. Sheldon's will was proved in April 1613, and an inventory of Dame Jane Tasburghe's possessions at Bracondale House beside Norwich was made in that year (to the value of nearly £379.00). Yet it appears that she was then still living, and that the will of Dame Jane Tasburghe was proved on 19 November 1621. The Catholicism of the Tasburgh family which so affected its fortunes through the later 17th and 18th centuries appears to have been owing to the influence and example of Lettice Tasburgh (née Cressy) upon her descendants and successors.

== Notes ==
Political offices
Preceded by Paul Darell	High Sheriff of Buckinghamshire; 1581–1582	Succeeded by Edmund Verney
