= Henry Long (died 1573) =

English politician

Henry Long (1544–1573), of Shingay, Cambridgeshire, was an English politician.

== Family ==
Henry Long was born about 1544, son of Sir Richard Long (c. 1494 – 1546) and Margaret Donnington. King Henry VIII was his godfather.

He married Dorothy Clarke, daughter of Nicholas Clarke of North Weston, Oxfordshire, step-daughter of Roger Alford of Hitcham, Buckinghamshire. They had one daughter, Elizabeth (c. 1562–1611) who married William Russell, 1st Baron Russell of Thornhaugh.

After Henry's death in April 1573, his widow married Sir Charles Morison. Dorothy had four children with him and died in 1618.

== Career ==
He was Sheriff for Cambridgeshire and Huntingdonshire in 1569–70. He was a Member (MP) of the Parliament of England for Cambridgeshire in 1571.
