= Edward Johnson (composer) =

English composer (fl1572-1601)

Edward Johnson (fl. 1572–1601) was an English composer. Johnson's compositions were highly regarded in his time, but few of them survive.

== Life ==
Johnson was born about 1549. He composed pieces for members of the Elizabethan aristocracy, and had a long association with the Kitson family, who had houses in London and Hengrave, Suffolk. Sir Thomas Kitson (1540-1603) and his wife Elizabeth Kitson also employed the composer John Wilbye from the 1590s.

Johnson obtained a Mus. Bac. degree in 1594 from Caius College, Cambridge. He appears in documentary records relating to the beginning of the seventeenth century. With John Wilbye he corrected the proofs of Dowland´s Second Book of Songs, which was published in London in 1600. He was also mentioned in connection with arrangements for the funeral of his patron Sir Thomas Kitson, an event which took place in Hengrave in 1603. It is not known what happened to him subsequently.

== Works ==
Perhaps his best-known work is "Eliza Is the Fairest Queen" (a tribute to Elizabeth I). Other works include:

- "Come, blessed bird": madrigal for six voices (SSAATB) from The Triumphs of Oriana
- "Jhonsons Medley" (Fitzwilliam Virginal Book).
