= William Bourchier, 3rd Earl of Bath =

English noble (1557–1623)

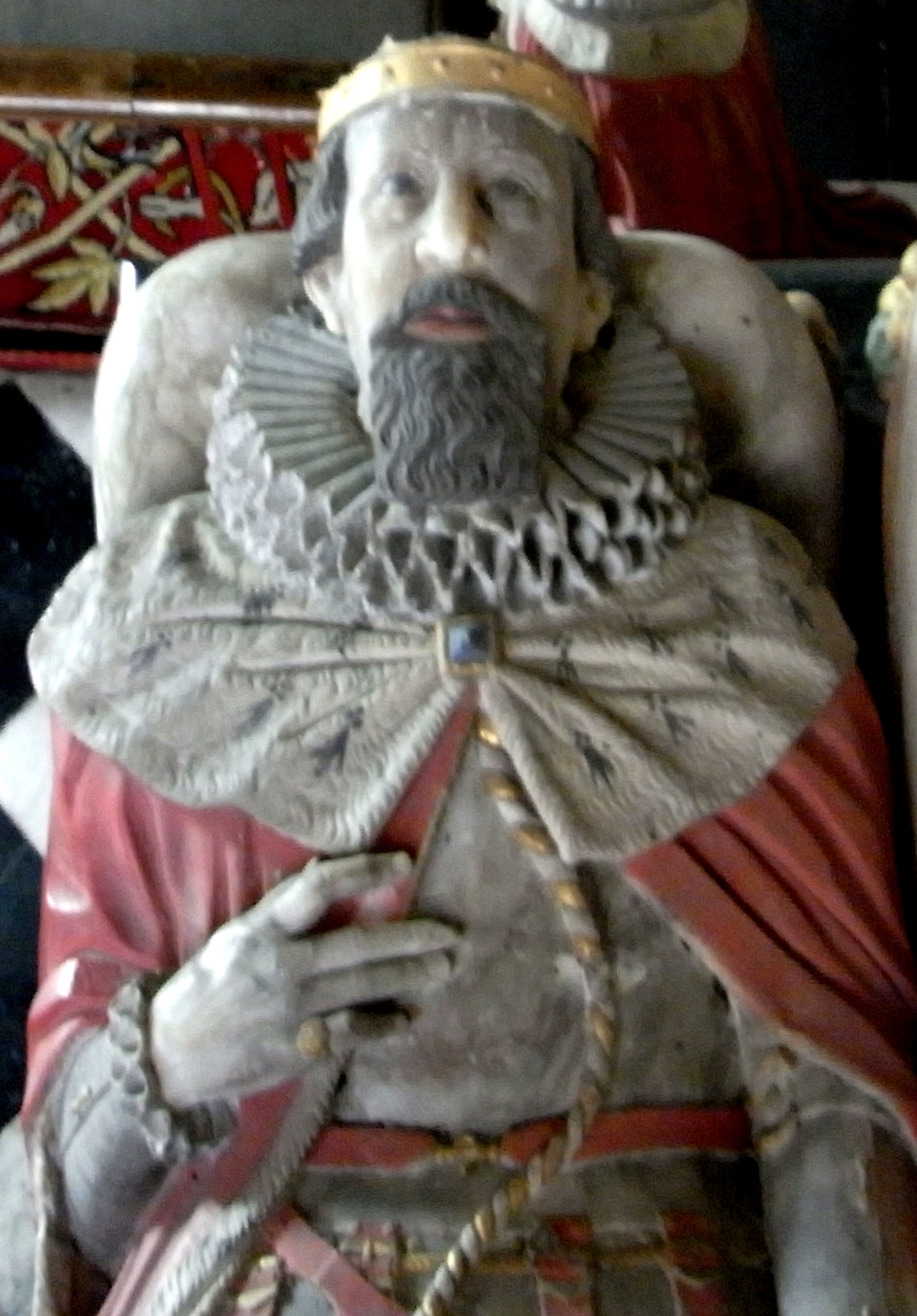
- Effigy of William Bourchier, 3rd Earl of Bath (died 1623), wearing an earl's coronet and robes with ermine collar with sapphire clasp, St Peter's Church, Tawstock, Devon
- Born: 29 September 1557; Devon
- Died: 12 July 1623 (aged 65)
- Resting place: St. Peter's Church, Tawstock, Devon
- Successor: Edward Bourchier, 4th Earl of Bath
- Spouses: Mary Cornwallis; Lady Elizabeth Russell
- Children: Richard Bourchier, Lord FitzWarin; Edward Bourchier, 4th Earl of Bath; Frances Bourchier
- Parent(s): John Bourchier, Lord FitzWarin; Frances Kitson

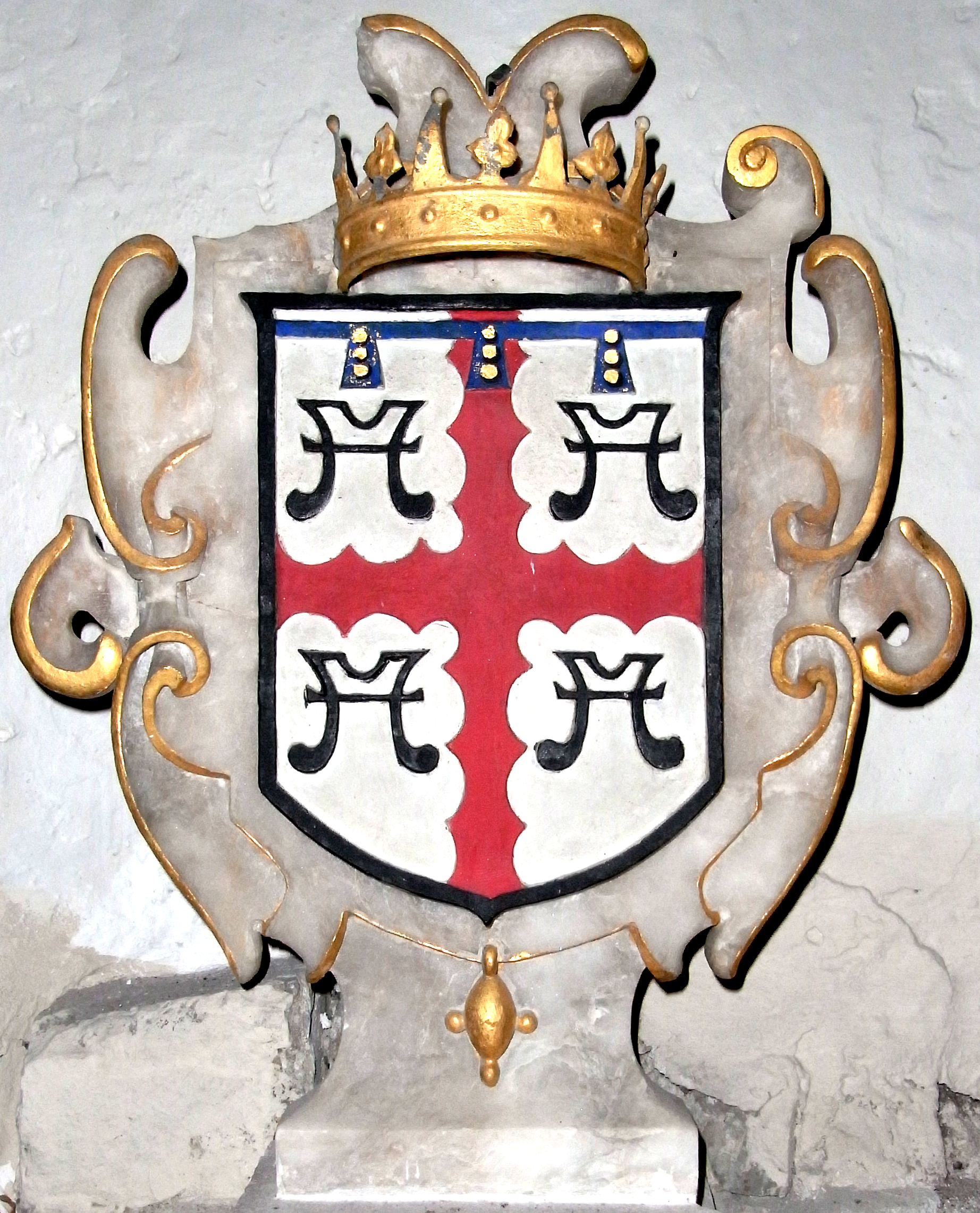
Canting arms of William Bourchier, 3rd Earl of Bath: Argent, a cross engrailed gules between four water bougets sable a label of three points azure each point charged with three bezants for difference, detail from top of his monument in Tawstock Church

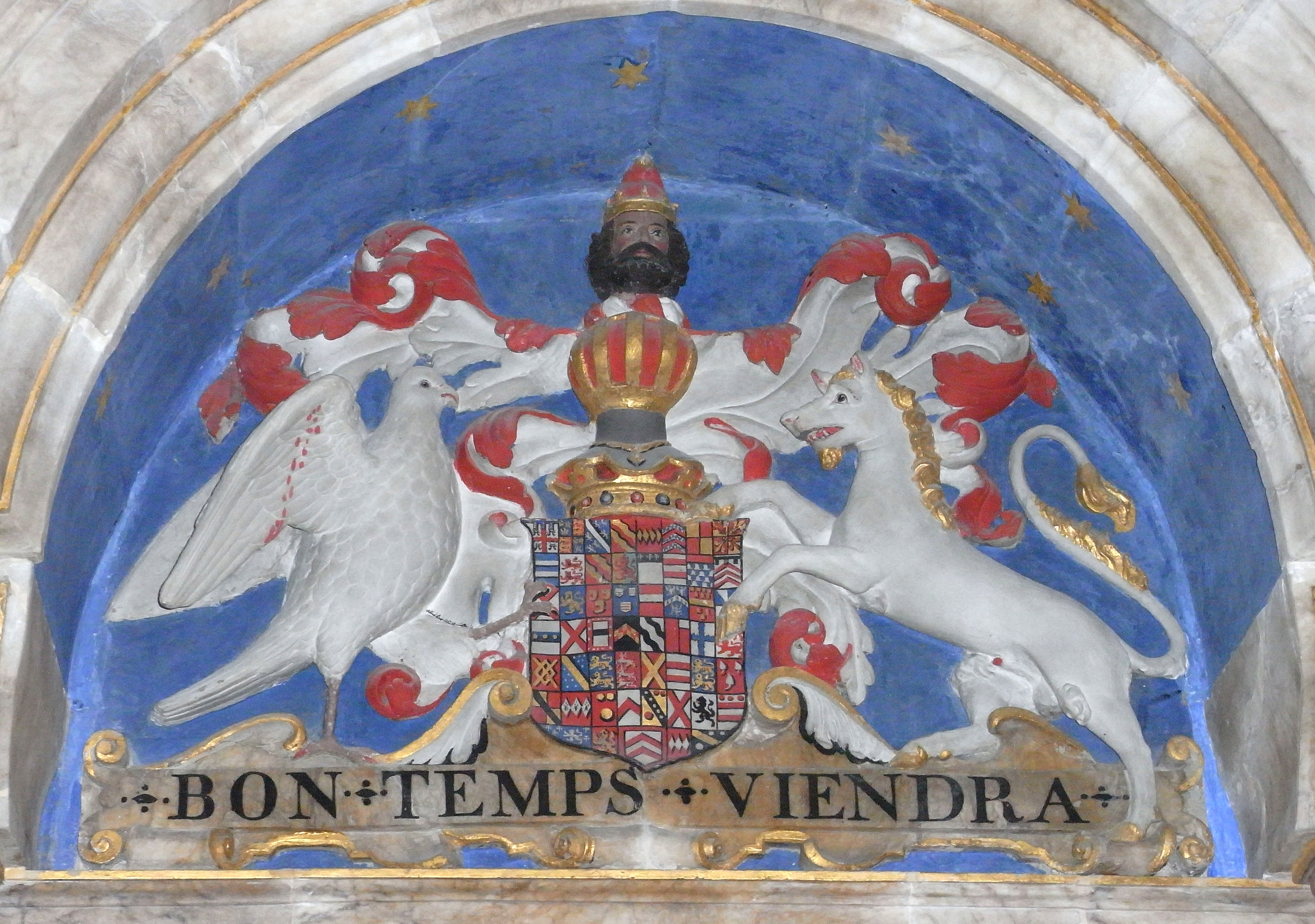
heraldic achievement of William Bourchier, 3rd Earl of Bath, detail from his monument in Tawstock Church. The escutcheon shows 53 quarterings with supporters, dexter: a falcon argent beaked and membered or the wings elevated vulned gules; sinister: an heraldic tiger argent. (Note: Supporters as surviving in stained glass window in cloister of Hengrave Hall, Suffolk, of arms of John Bourchier, 2nd Earl of Bath as blazoned by Rokewood) Above is the crest of Bourchier: A man's head in profile proper ducally crowned or with a pointed cap gules; below is the motto of Bourchier: Bon Temps Viendra ("the right time will come")

William Bourchier, 3rd Earl of Bath (29 September 1557 – 12 July 1623) was Lord Lieutenant of Devon. His seat was at Tawstock Court, three miles south of Barnstaple in North Devon, which he rebuilt in the Elizabethan style in 1574, the date being sculpted on the surviving gatehouse.

== Origins ==
He was born on 29 September 1557 in Devon, the eldest son of John Bourchier, Lord FitzWarin (died 1557) (who died shortly after his birth, having predeceased his own father John Bourchier, 2nd Earl of Bath (died 1561) by his wife Frances Kitson (died 1586), a daughter of Sir Thomas Kitson (died 1540) of Hengrave Hall, Suffolk and Margaret Donnington, Countess of Bath. Her elaborate monument with effigy exists in Tawstock Church. William succeeded to the earldom on the death of his grandfather, John Bourchier, 2nd Earl of Bath in 1561.

== Marriages and children ==
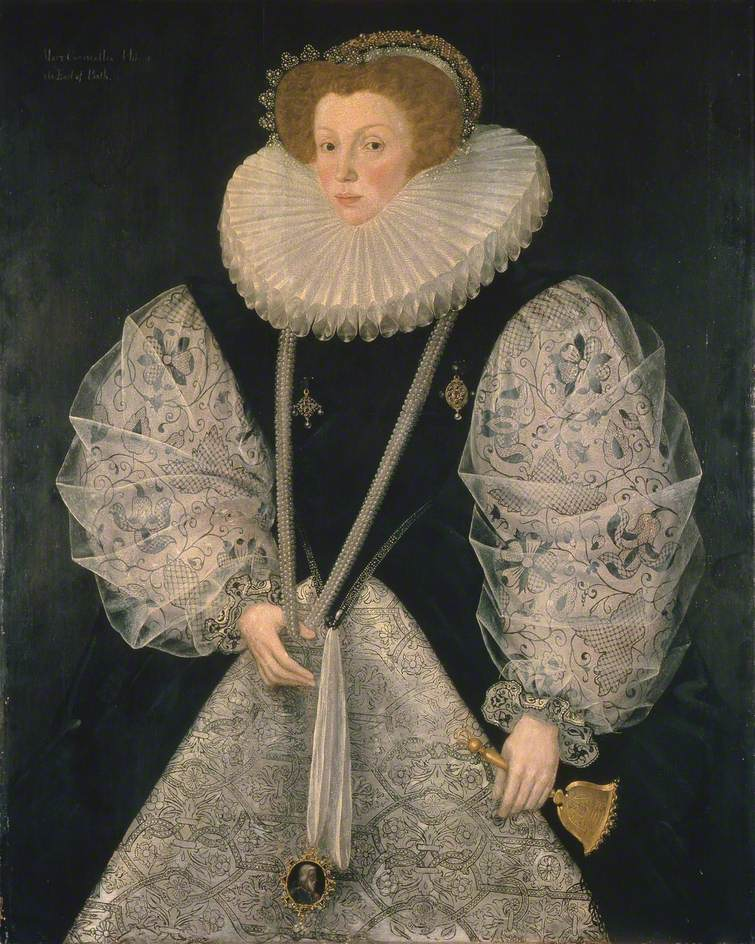
Mary Cornwallis (d.1627), first wife, portrait by George Gower, Manchester City Art Gallery

He married twice:

- Firstly, in secret on 15 December 1578, to Mary Cornwallis, a daughter of Sir Thomas Cornwallis (1518–1604), of Brome Hall, Eye, Suffolk. The marriage was largely arranged by Sir Thomas Kytson, the young earl's uncle and Mary's brother-in-law. The marriage was subsequently repudiated, according to some sources because the earl's mother, Frances Kytson, by then remarried to William Barnaby, would not consent to the match. A lawsuit was commenced in May 1580 and the marriage was annulled by a judge on 28 April 1581.
- Secondly, in 1583 to Lady Elizabeth Russell, daughter of Francis Russell, 2nd Earl of Bedford, Lord Lieutenant of Devon, the wealthiest and most powerful man in Devon. One of his many manors was Bishops Tawton, the village and parish church of which is situated directly across the River Taw and is prominently visible from Tawstock Court. They had four children, as shown in effigies on the monument at Tawstock, and identified in the inscription (see below):
  - John Bourchier, Lord FitzWarin, eldest son and heir apparent, (bap 24 Sep 1585 at Tawstock, buried March 1586/7 at Tawstock). Baron FitzWarin was the courtesy title used by the eldest son and heir apparent of the Bourchier Earls of Bath.
  - Robert Bourchier, Lord FitzWarin, second son, (bap 3 Mar 1587/8 at Tawstock, buried 27 May 1588 at Tawstock)
  - Edward Bourchier, 4th Earl of Bath (1590–1636), eldest surviving son and heir. Misrecorded (or mistranscribed) in the unsigned Bourchier pedigree in the Heraldic Visitation of Devon, 1620, (Vivian, p. 107) as "Ricus, D'ns Fitzwarren”.
  - Lady Frances Bourchier (1587–1612), died unmarried aged 25. In 1603 she joined the household of Princess Elizabeth. A monument to her survives in the Bedford Chapel, Chenies, Buckinghamshire. It consists of a plain slab of black marble supported by four white marble Doric columns which form a canopy to a second slab of black marble, under which is a step of black marble on the floor. Two heraldic lozenges on the lower slab are surmounted by an Earl's coronet, sculpted in relief in white marble. An inscription records the erection of the monument by Lady Anne Clifford (1590–1676) "her deare cosen", daughter of Lady Margaret Russell and therefore her first cousin, and she is mentioned several times in Anne's diaries. The arms displayed are of Bourchier with ten quarterings and are the same as shown on the gatehouse of Tawstock Court. (Note: These 10 quarterings are also visible in stained glass in the cloister of Hengrave Hall, Suffolk: Bourchier, Louvaine, FitzWarin, Audley, Cogan, Hankford, Stapledon, Martin, Dinham, Arches, all impaling Donnington (Argent, three pallets azure on a chief gules three bezants), the third wife of the 2nd Earl.)

== Death and burial ==
He and his wife, Elizabeth, are buried in the choir of St. Peter's Church, Tawstock, Devon, where one can see their elaborate monument.

== Monument at Tawstock ==
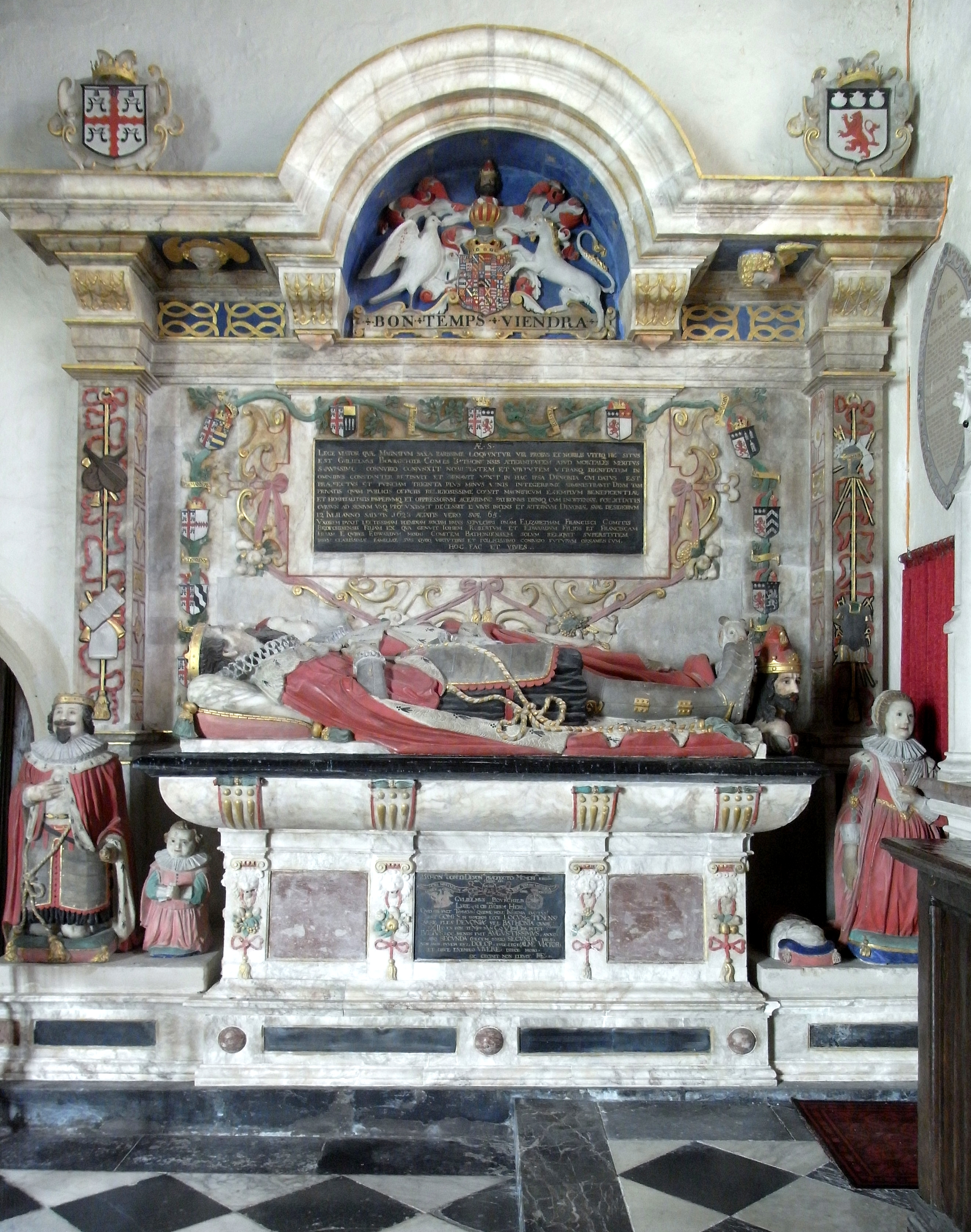
Monument to William Bourchier, 3rd Earl of Bath and his wife Elizabeth Russell, St Peter's Church, Tawstock, Devon, north wall of chancel

A magnificent and sumptuous monument exists in St Peter's Church, Tawstock, incorporating recumbent effigies of William Bourchier, 3rd Earl of Bath and his wife Elizabeth Russell. It was restored in 1999 by Lawrence and Sue Kelland, mainly to replace the iron bands within the alabaster which threatened to rust and thereby expand to crack the stone. The iron was replaced with stainless steel and the monument was repainted. Kneeling to the left is their adult son and an infant child, whilst on the right kneels their adult daughter with a recumbent infant at her side. Two vines grow up on either side of the main effigies, on the dexter inhabited with heraldic escutcheons showing five generations of ancestry described by five shields of Bourchier impaling the arms of their wives. On the sinister vine are shown five similar escutcheons describing the ancestry of Elizabeth Russell over five generations as follows, from ground upwards:

- Gules, three herrings hauriant argent (Herringham)
- Sable, a griffin segreant between three cross crosslets fitchy argent (Froxmere)
- Sable, three chevronnels ermine (Wyse )
- Sable, three dovecotes argent (Sapcote)
- Argent, on a chief gules two mullets or (St John)

At the top above the recumbent couple, the two vines meet at which point is displayed an escutcheon of Bourchier impaling Russell. On the top of the cornice to the dexter is shown a large escutcheon of the Bourchier arms, on the sinister the arms of Russell. Above the couple is a black tablet inscribed in capital gold lettering with an epitaph. On the base is a further tablet containing a mix of anagram, chronogram and epigram, to be deciphered by the viewer. At the feet of the Earl is his crest of the head in profile and shoulders of a bearded oriental man wearing a Phrygian cap with a pointed tasselled top flopped over. At the feet of his wife is a goat statant argent armed and unguled or, the crest of Russell, now with horns broken off.

=== Crest ===
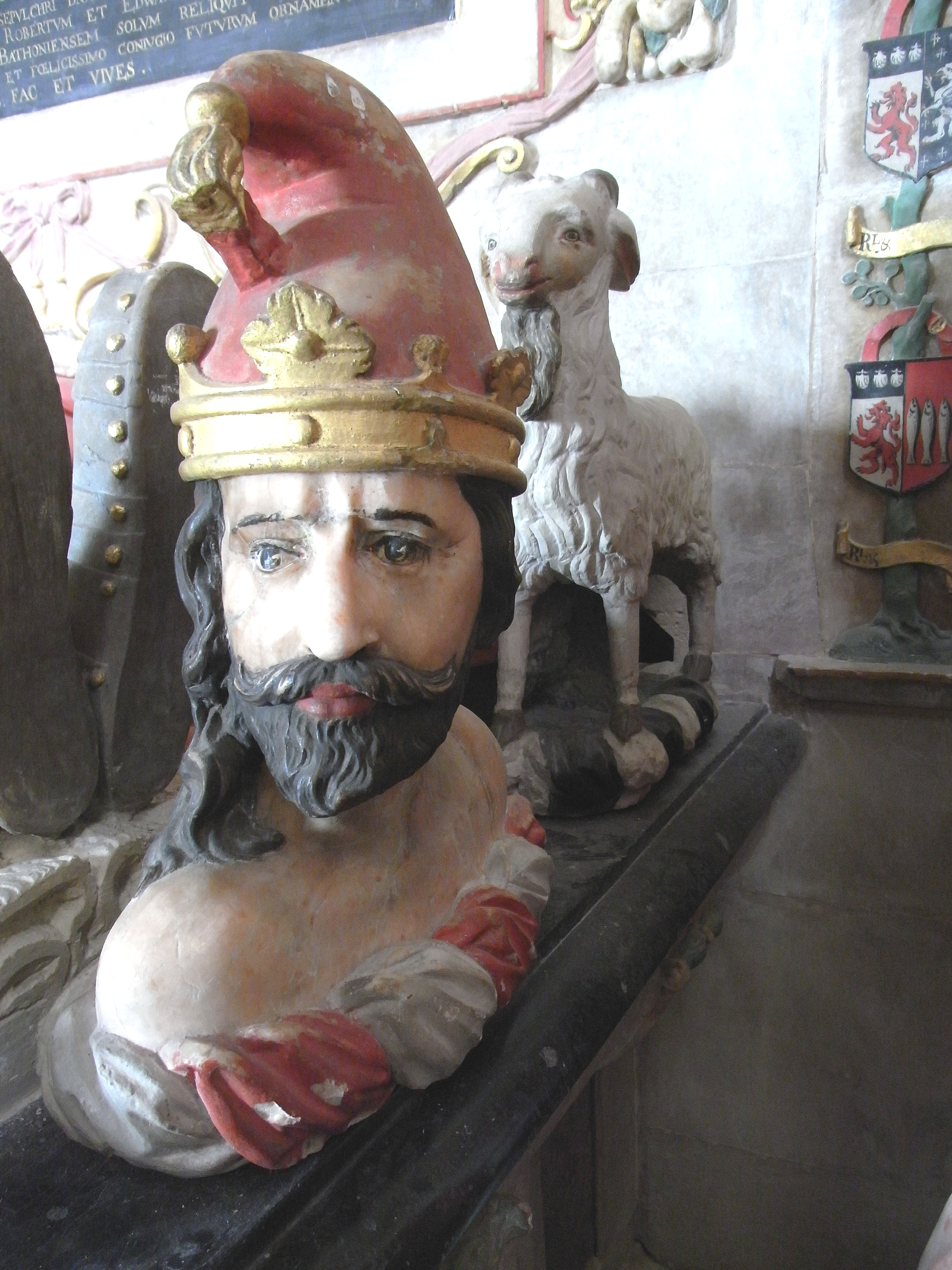
Heraldic footrests on monument to William Bourchier, 3rd Earl of Bath (died 1623), Tawstock Church. The figures represent the crests of Bourchier and of Russell, his wife Elizabeth's family: Bourchier: A man's head in profile proper ducally crowned or with a pointed cap gules; Russell: A goat statant argent armed and unguled or

The Bourchier crest was explained by John Weever (died 1632) as follows:

"In the hall of the manor house of Newton Hall in this parish (i.e. Little Dunmow, Essex) remaineth in an old painting two postures, the one for an ancestor of the Bourchiers, combatant with another, being a pagan king, for the truth of Christ, whom the said Englishman overcame and in memory thereof his descendants have ever since bore the head of the same infidel as also used the surname BOWSER, as I had it out of the collections of Augustin Vincent, Windsor Herald, deceased"

The Phrygian cap is an iconographical symbol of Oriental kings.

=== Epitaph ===
Above the couples' effigies is a black rectangular tablet inscribed in capital gold lettering with an epitaph in Latin as follows:

Ae(ternae) S(acrum). Lege viator quae magnatum saxa rarissime loquuntur: vir probus et nobilis uter(que) hic situs est. Guilielmus Bourgchier Comes Bathoniensis aeternitatem apud mortales meritus. Suavissimo connubio conjunxit nobilitatem et virtutem utranq(ue) dignitatem in omnibus constanter retinuit et ornavit. Vixit in hac ipsa Devonia cui datus est praefectus et provinciam triginta plus minus annis integerrime administravit. Deum tam privatis quam publicis officiis religiosissime coluit. Magnificum exemplum beneficentiae et hospitalitatis pauperumq(ue) et oppressorum acerrimus patronus. Deniq(ue) cum inoffensae foelicitatis cursum ad senium usq(ue) produxisset decessit e vivis incens et aeternum Devoniae suae desiderium 12.o Julii anno salutis 1623 aetatis vero suae 65.o. Uxorem duxit lectissimam foeminam sociam huius sepulchri D(omi)nam Elizabetham Francisci Comitis Bedfordiensis filiam ex qua genuit Joh(an)em Robertum et Edwardum filios et Franciscam filiam e quibus Edwardum modo Comitem Bathoniensem solum reliquit superstitem ipsum clarissimae familiae suis quoq(ue) virtutibus et foelicissimo conjugio futurum ornamentum. Hoc fac et Vives

Translated into English thus:

"Sacred to eternity. Read O Traveller what (grave)stones of the great very seldom speak: Here lies a man both upright and noble, William Bourchier Earl of Bath, deserving of eternal memory amongst men. By a most pleasing marriage he joined virtue to nobility and in everything unswervingly preserved and adorned the dignity of both. He lived in this very county of Devon of which he was given the prefecture and for more or less thirty years he administered his province with the greatest integrity. He honoured God most religiously as well in private as in public duties. He was a great example of benificence and hospitality and a most keen patron of the poor and oppressed. At last when he had led on his life even to old age he departed from the living, to the great and lasting sorrow of Devon, on the twelfth of July in the year of Redemption 1623 and indeed in the 65th of his age. As wife he married the most select woman, his companion in this sepulchre, Elizabeth, daughter of Francis, Earl of Bedford, with whom he begat sons John, Robert and Edward and Frances a daughter, out of whom he left behind him only Edward, late Earl of Bath, himself about to be an ornament to his most famous family also in his virtues and from his most happy marriage. This do and thou shalt live"

=== Cryptic tablet ===
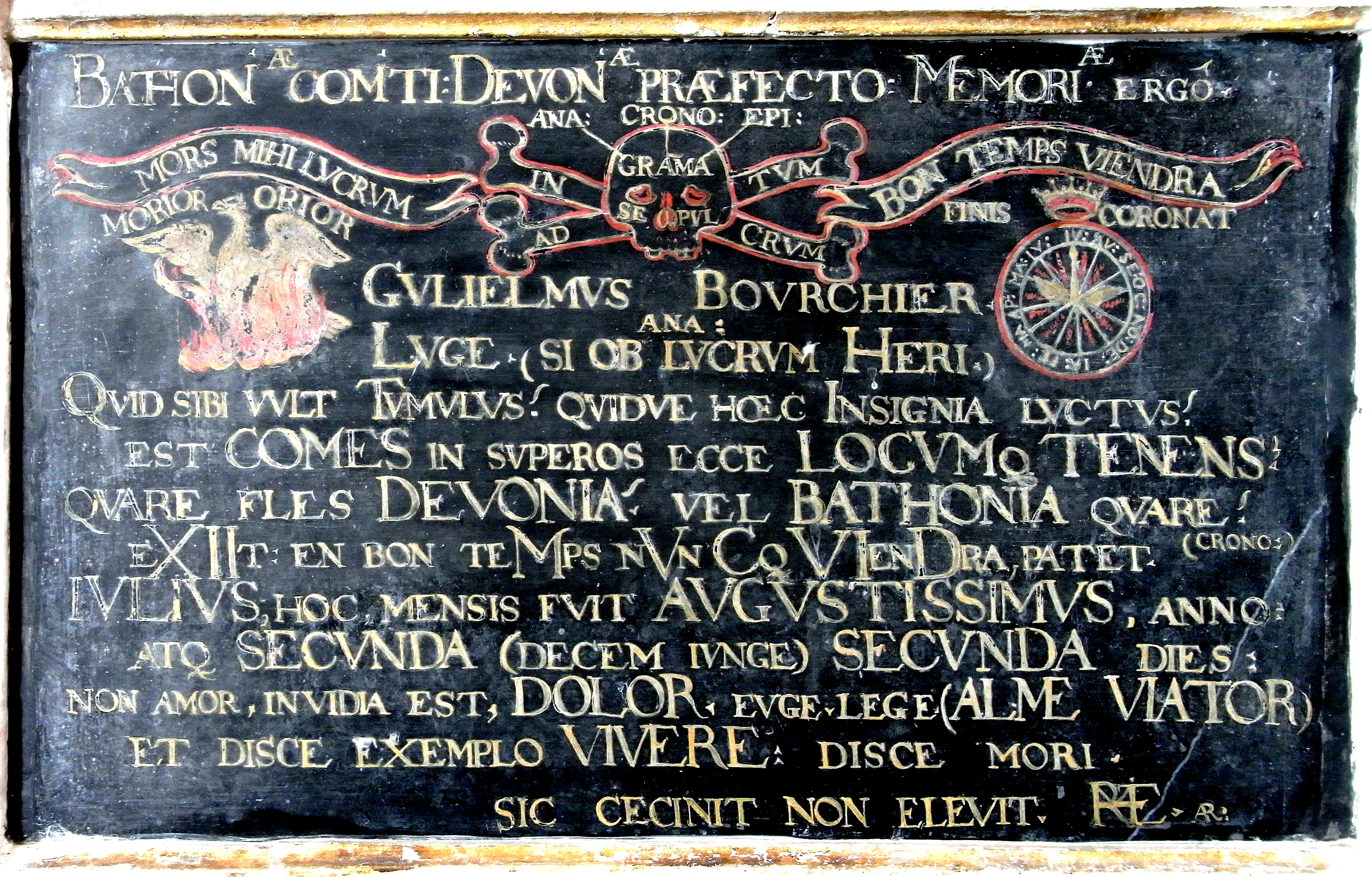
Cryptic tablet on base of monument to William Bourchier, 3rd Earl of Bath (died 1623)

On the base of his monument appears a cryptic tablet. It comprises separate elements of anagram, chronogram and epigram. Top: Bathon(i)ae Com(i)ti Devonae praefecto memoriae ergo ("To the memory of the Earl of Bath therefore to the prefect (i.e. Lord Lieutenant) of Devon"). Beneath this line is in the centre an inscribed skull and cross-bones, with to its left the image of a phoenix rising from a fire above which is Morior Orior ("I am dead, I shall arise") above which is inscribed on a scroll the well-known Roman epithet: Mors mihi lucrum ("Death to me is reward"). On the right side of the skull is an image of a circular dial inscribed around the circumference with the first two letters of the 12 months of the year. The top-most month, which is crowned, is IV i.e. JU for July, the month of his death. Above is inscribed: Finis Coronat ("the end crowns"), above which is inscribed on a scroll the French motto of Bourchier: Bon temps viendra ("The right time will come"). Within the skull is written on the top line grama, to which word three other words point from above the skull, ana-, chrono- and epi- (all Greek words in Latin form). These denote to the reader the presence of anagrams, chronograms, epigrams and other puzzles within the tablet. In the skull below the word grama are the two Latin words se and pul, and on the two bones which intersect behind the skull are written 4 more Latin words: ad, in, tum, and crum, which may all be combined together to form the sentences: in sepulcrum ad sepultum ("into the grave in order to be buried") or in sepultum ad se pulcrum ("in the act of burial one's-self (is made) beautiful"). Below is the anagram, on the top line the words Gulielmus Bourchier ("William Bourchier"), below which is the indicator ana-: and the name's Latin anagram Luge (si ob lucrum heri) ("mourn if on account of the profit of yesterday"). Below is a Latin epigram with some words in capitals, which may relate to a chronogram or other word-game: Quid sibi vult tumulus quidve haec insignia luctus est comes in superos ecce locumo tenens quare fles Devonia vel Bathonia quare ("If you wish to know what is this pile or why this great mourning, the Earl behold is above as place-holder (lieutenant), as weeps Devon and Bath"). Below is a chronogram: "eXIIt en bon teMps nVnCo VIenDra patet" (exiit en bon temps nunc (o?) viendra patet) a mixture of limited sense in Latin and the French motto of Bourchier, meaning "he went in good time now he shall come he seeks". When the capital Roman numerals are added together individually they make 1,623, the year of his death. Underneath is a further possibly cryptic epigram, with some words in capitals: Julius hoc mensis fuit Augustissimus anno atq(ue) secunda decem junge secunda dies non amor invidia est dolor euge lege alme viator et disce exemplo vivere: disce more sic cecivit (cecidit?) not elevit, translated as "The month of July was the most august in this year and the following day...is hatred not love, well-done! read O Traveller and teach by (his) example (how ) to live: teach (how) to die, thus he has fallen he has not arisen". At the end are two monograms: "R...E" and "AR".

== Other monuments ==
A 1599 escutcheon in Weare Giffard Hall (about 8 miles south-west of Tawstock), then a seat of the Fortescue family, displays the arms of William Bourchier, 3rd Earl of Bath, with another two showing the Royal arms and those of Edward Russell, 3rd Earl of Bedford, Custos Rotulorum of Devon. (Note: Baring-Gould, Sabine, "Devon": "In approaching the house, we have on our left the square gateway tower, and enter, by a low modern Gothic porch, the entrance hall. Above the fireplace are two oak carvings of the Adoration of the Magi and the Resurrection. The walls of the hall are lined with tapestry. The best view of the hall roof is obtained from the gallery. The north wall is ornamented with three full-length portraits in the style of Sir Peter Lely, and some Elizabethan medallions. On the south wall are three coats-of-arms in relief: the Royal arms, dating 1599; on the right, the Bedford; on the left, those of Bourchier, Earl of Bath. To the height of 10 ft. the walls are panelled with richly carved oak. There are several rooms with interesting fireplaces")

== Sources ==
- http://www.tribalpages.com/tribes/royalancestralc
- tudorplace.com.ar Accessed 30 August 2008
- thepeerage.com. Retrieved 30 August 2008
- churchmonumentssociety.org. Retrieved 30 August 2008
- Vivian, Lt.Col. J.L., (Ed.) The Visitations of the County of Devon: Comprising the Heralds' Visitations of 1531, 1564 & 1620. Exeter, 1895.

Political offices
Preceded by The 2nd Earl of Bedford	Lord Lieutenant of Devon; 1586–1623	Succeeded by The 4th Earl of Bedford
Peerage of England
Preceded by John Bourchier	Earl of Bath; 1561–1623	Succeeded by Edward Bourchier
