= Henry Cornwallis (MP for Orford) =

Henry Cornwallis (by 1532–1599), of Brome, Suffolk and Buxton, Norfolk, was an English Member of Parliament (MP).

He was a Member of the Parliament of England for Orford in 1553. His brother, Thomas Cornwallis, was MP for Grampound, Gatton and Suffolk.
