= Thomas Lichfield =

16th-century English politician

Thomas Lichfield (died 1586) was an English politician.

He was a member (MP) of the parliament of England for Aylesbury in 1571 and 1572.

In 1573, he married Margaret, the daughter of Thomas Pakington, Sheriff of Worcester.
