= John Bourchier, 2nd Earl of Bath =

English noble

Canting arms of Bourchier: Argent, a cross engrailed gules between four water bougets sable

John Bourchier, 2nd Earl of Bath PC (1499 in Devon – 10 February 1560/61) was an Earl in the peerage of England. He also succeeded to the titles of 12th Baron FitzWarin, Baron Daubeney and 4th Count of Eu.

== Origins ==
He was the son of John Bourchier, 1st Earl of Bath and Cecily Daubeney. He was the first cousin of Anne Stanhope, daughter of the 1st Earl of Bath's sister, Elizabeth Bourchier. Upon her marriage to Edward Seymour, 1st Duke of Somerset, she became the sister-in-law to Queen Jane Seymour and therefore the Aunt of King Edward VI. After the death of Henry VIII, his widow, Catherine Parr, married Thomas Seymour, 1st Baron Seymour of Sudeley. This made Anne the sister-in-law to two English queens.

== Career ==
In 1519 he was appointed Sheriff of Somerset and Sheriff of Dorset and was knighted in 1523. On the death of King Edward VI (1547–1553), he was one of the first to declare Queen Mary his rightful heir. He was invested as a Privy Counsellor in 1533, and served as a Commissioner at the coronation of Queen Mary. Bourchier was also a commissioner at the trial of Lady Jane Grey.

Other offices held by him included: Lord-Lieutenant of Cornwall, Lord-Lieutenant of Devon, Lord-Lieutenant of Dorset and Governor of Beaumaris Castle.

== Landholdings ==
In 1539 he was granted by King Henry VIII the manors of Hackpen, Sheldon, Bolham and Saint Hill, having already inherited the feudal barony of Okehampton from his grandmother, Elizabeth Dynham.

== Marriages ==
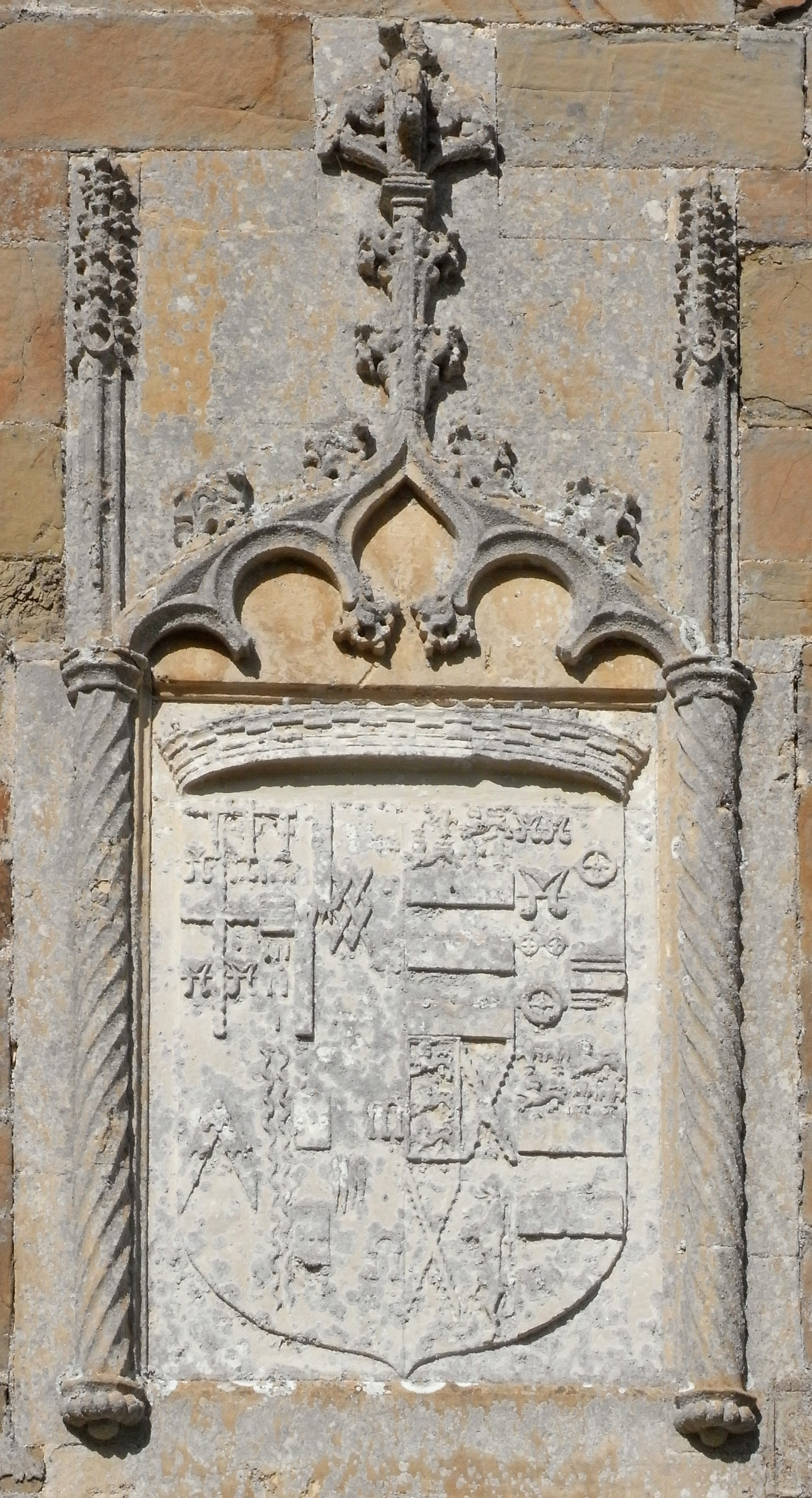
Arms of Bourchier impaling Manners, sculpted above door to south chancel aisle, built by the 2nd Earl, Tawstock Church. Representing arms of John Bourchier, 2nd Earl of Bath (1499 – 1560/61) (with 10 quarterings) impaling Manners (with 4 quarterings), for his second wife Eleanor Manners, daughter of George Manners, 11th Baron de Ros (c. 1470 – 1513)

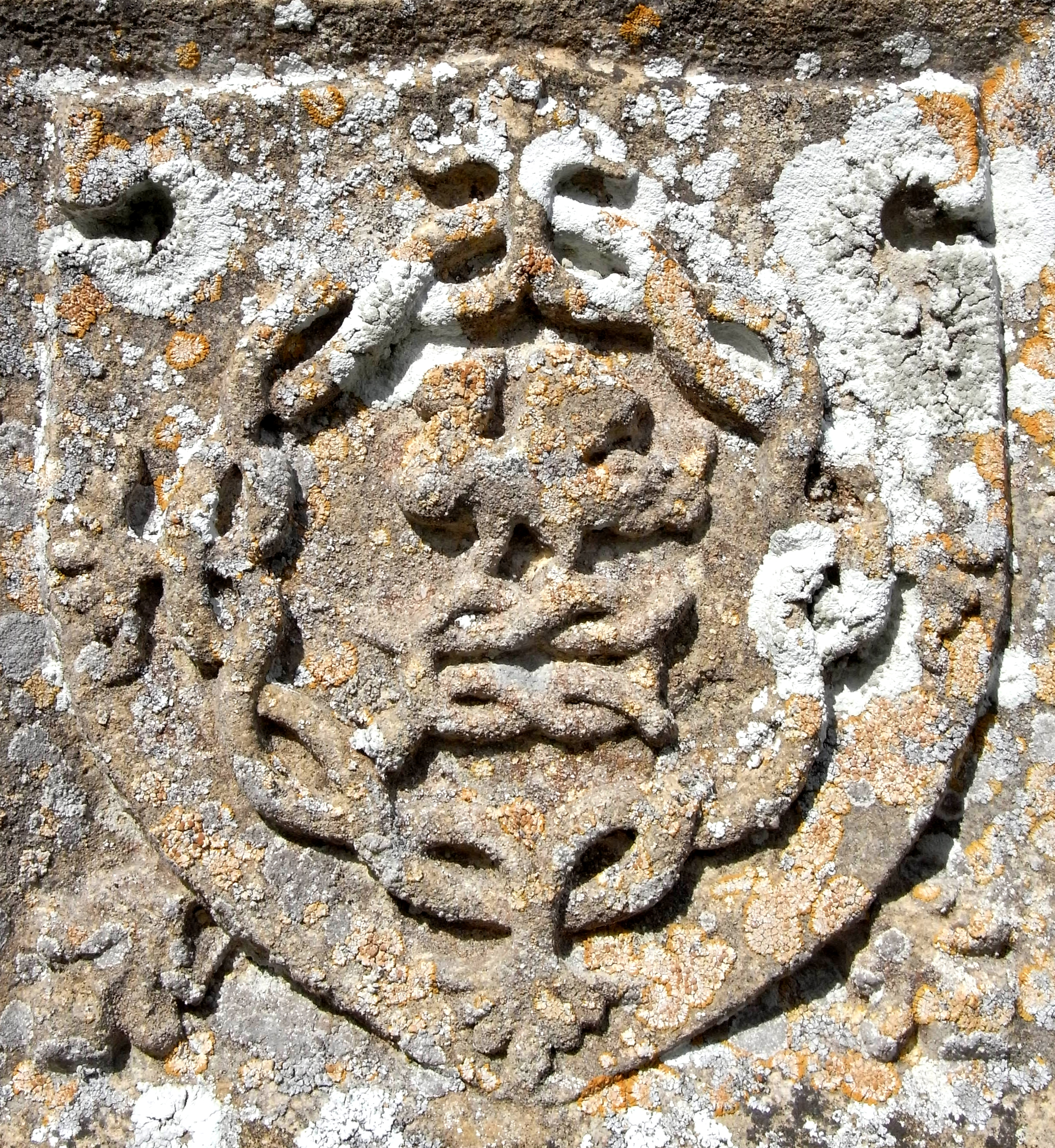
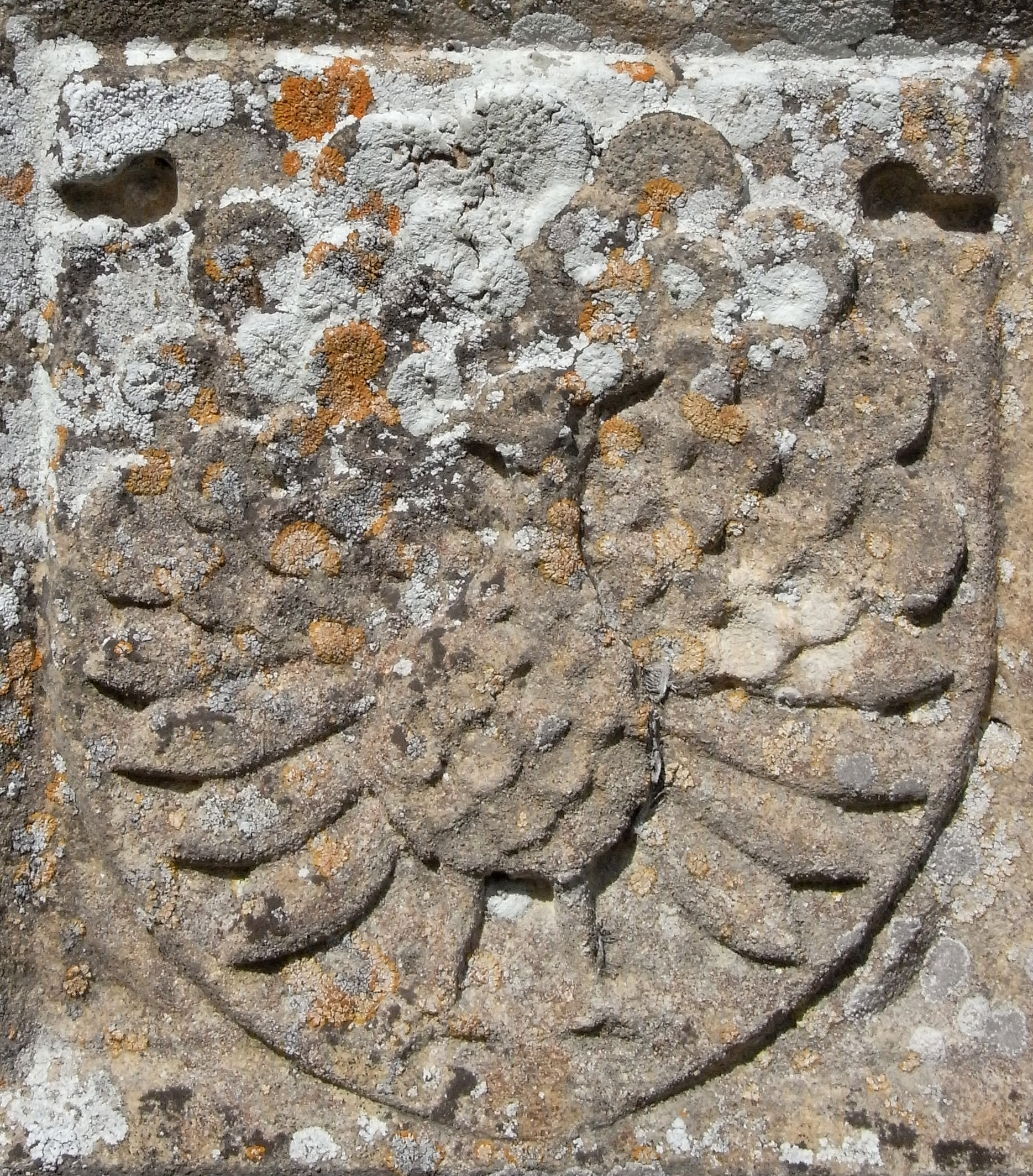
Pair of escutcheons à bouche above SE door of Tawstock Church, Devon: left: showing a falcon atop a Bourchier knot, Representing John Bourchier, 2nd Earl of Bath (1499 – 1560/61); right: showing a peacock in its pride, the crest of Manners, the family of his 2nd wife Eleanor Manners, daughter of George Manners, 11th Baron de Ros

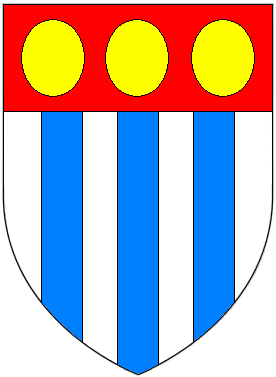
Arms of Donnington: Argent, three pallets azure on a chief gules three bezants

John Bourchier married three times:

- Firstly to Elizabeth (or Isabel) Hungerford, daughter of Sir Walter Hungerford (died 1516), of Farleigh, younger son of Robert Hungerford, 3rd Baron Hungerford (1428–1464). By Elizabeth he had one daughter:
  - Elizabeth Bourchier
- Secondly (before 25 May 1524) to Eleanor Manners, daughter of George Manners, 11th Baron de Ros by his wife Anne St. Leger. By Eleanor he had children including:
  - Elizabeth Bourchier b. 1518 d. 2 Oct. 1569 wife of Sir Richard Thomas Chase of Hundrich
  - John Bourchier, Lord FitzWarin, who predeceased his father. He married his step-sister Frances Kytson (died 1586), the daughter of his father's 3rd wife from her 1st marriage to Sir Thomas Kytson (died 1540) (see below). Her monument with recumbent effigy exists in Tawstock Church and is covered by the earliest six-columned canopy in Devon. His son by Frances Kytson was William Bourchier, 3rd Earl of Bath.
  - George Bourchier, soldier and statesman in Ireland; father of Henry Bourchier, 5th Earl of Bath
  - Cecilia Bourchier, who married Thomas Peyton great grandson of Thomas Peyton, her children included Henry Peyton
- Thirdly, on 4 December 1548, to Margaret Donnington (died 1562) daughter and sole heiress of John Donnington (died 1544) of Stoke Newington, a member of the Worshipful Company of Salters, by his wife Elizabeth Pye. Margaret Donnington was the widow successively of Sir Thomas Kitson (died 1540), the builder of Hengrave Hall in Suffolk, and next of Sir Richard Long (died 1546) of Wiltshire, Great Saxham and Shingay, Cambridgeshire, Gentleman of the Privy Chamber to King Henry VIII. Margaret Donnington was a strong-minded lady who insisted that at the same time as her marriage to Bourchier, his son and heir should marry her own daughter Frances Kitson. The double marriage took place at Hengrave on 11 December 1548. Thus the 2nd Earl's eldest son from his 2nd marriage to Eleanor Manners, John Bourchier, Lord FitzWarin (who predeceased his father), married his own step-sister, Francesca Kitson, and was by her the father of William Bourchier, 3rd Earl of Bath. Margaret Donnington and Bourchier made Hengrave their home and Bourchier was buried at Hengrave. Stained glass in the cloister of Hengrave Hall survives memorialising the Bourchier residency, showing ten quarterings of Bourchier (Bourchier, Louvaine, FitzWarin, Audley, Cogan, Hankford, Stapledon, Martin, Dinham, Arches) impaling Donnington (Argent, three pallets azure on a chief gules three bezants)

== Children and succession ==
His eldest son by his second marriage John Bourchier, Lord FitzWarin predeceased his father, having married (on 11 December 1548 at Hengrave) his step-sister Frances Kytson, daughter of Sir Thomas Kytson of Hengrave Hall by Margaret Donnington. Their son William Bourchier, 3rd Earl of Bath (1557–1623), therefore succeeded his grandfather in the earldom, aged under 1 year old. The title became extinct in 1654 on the death of the 5th Earl.

== Death and burial ==
He died on 10 February 1560/61 and was buried on 10 March at Hengrave, Suffolk.

Political offices
Preceded by The 1st Earl of Bedford	Lord Lieutenant of Devon; 1556–1561	Vacant Title next held by The 2nd Earl of Bedford
Preceded by The 1st Earl of Bedford	Lord Lieutenant of Dorset; 1556–1558	Succeeded by The Lord Mountjoy
Peerage of England
Preceded by John Bourchier	Earl of Bath; 1539–1561	Succeeded by William Bourchier
