= Elizabeth Kitson =

English music patron

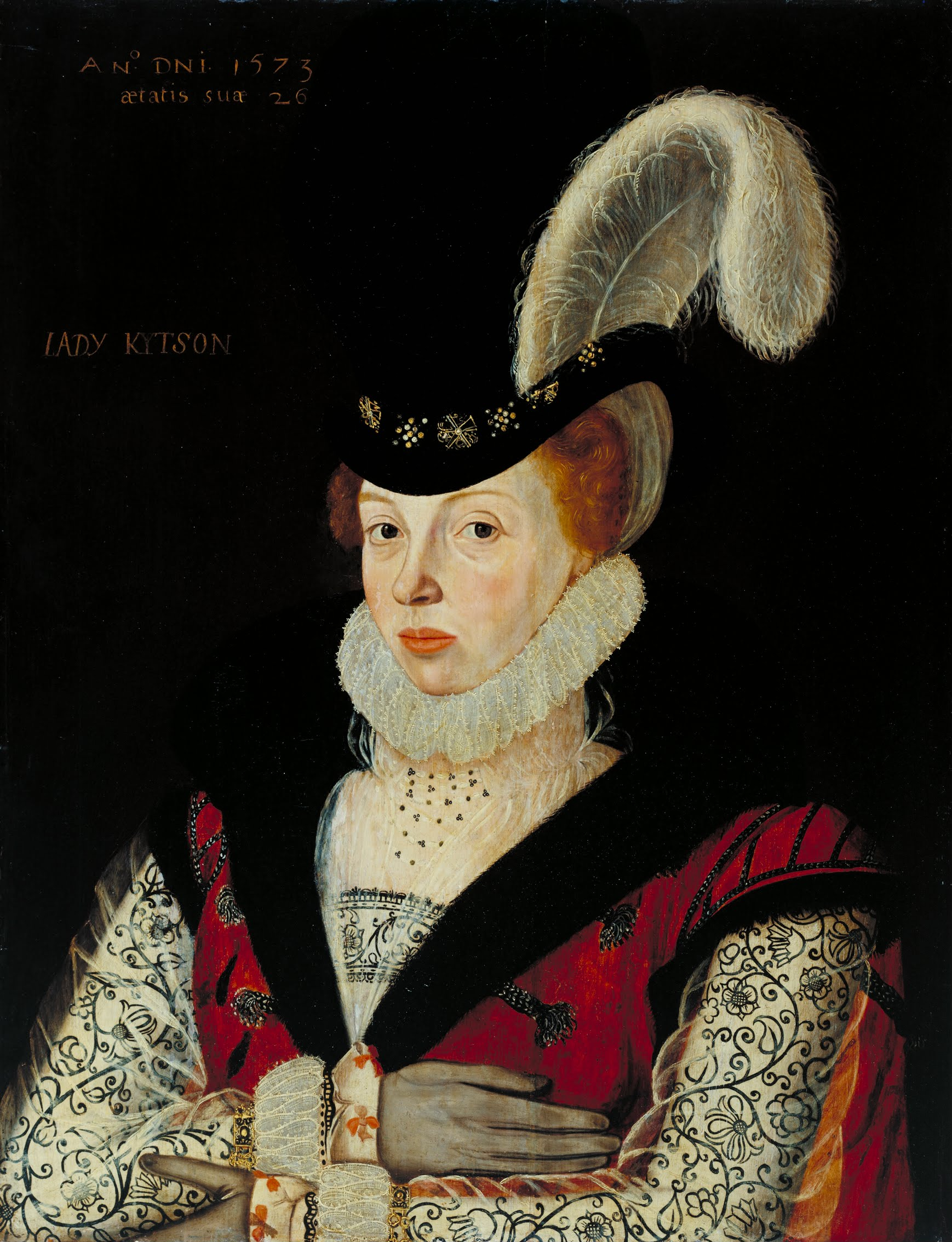
- Portrait by George Gower, 1573
- Born: Elizabeth Cornwallis; 1546 or 1547; Brome, Suffolk, England
- Died: 2 August 1628 (aged 81–82)
- Other name: sometimes spelt Kytson
- Spouse: Sir Thomas Kitson (m. 1561; died 1603)
- Parents: Sir Thomas Cornwallis; Anne Jerningham Cornwallis
- Relatives: William Cornwallis (brother); Charles Cornwallis (brother)

Elizabeth, Lady Kitson (née Lady Elizabeth Cornwallis; born 1546 or 1547; died 2 August 1628) was an English music patron. She came from East Anglia and married the owner of Hengrave Hall in Suffolk. The Kitsons also had a London house. They gave permanent employment to musicians.

== Life ==
Elizabeth Cornwallis was born in 1546 or 1547. Her parents were Thomas Cornwallis and Anne Jerningham. Her brothers were the diplomat Sir Charles Cornwallis and the politician Sir William Cornwallis and she had three sisters. Elizabeth received the training necessary to be the household manager of a rich family.

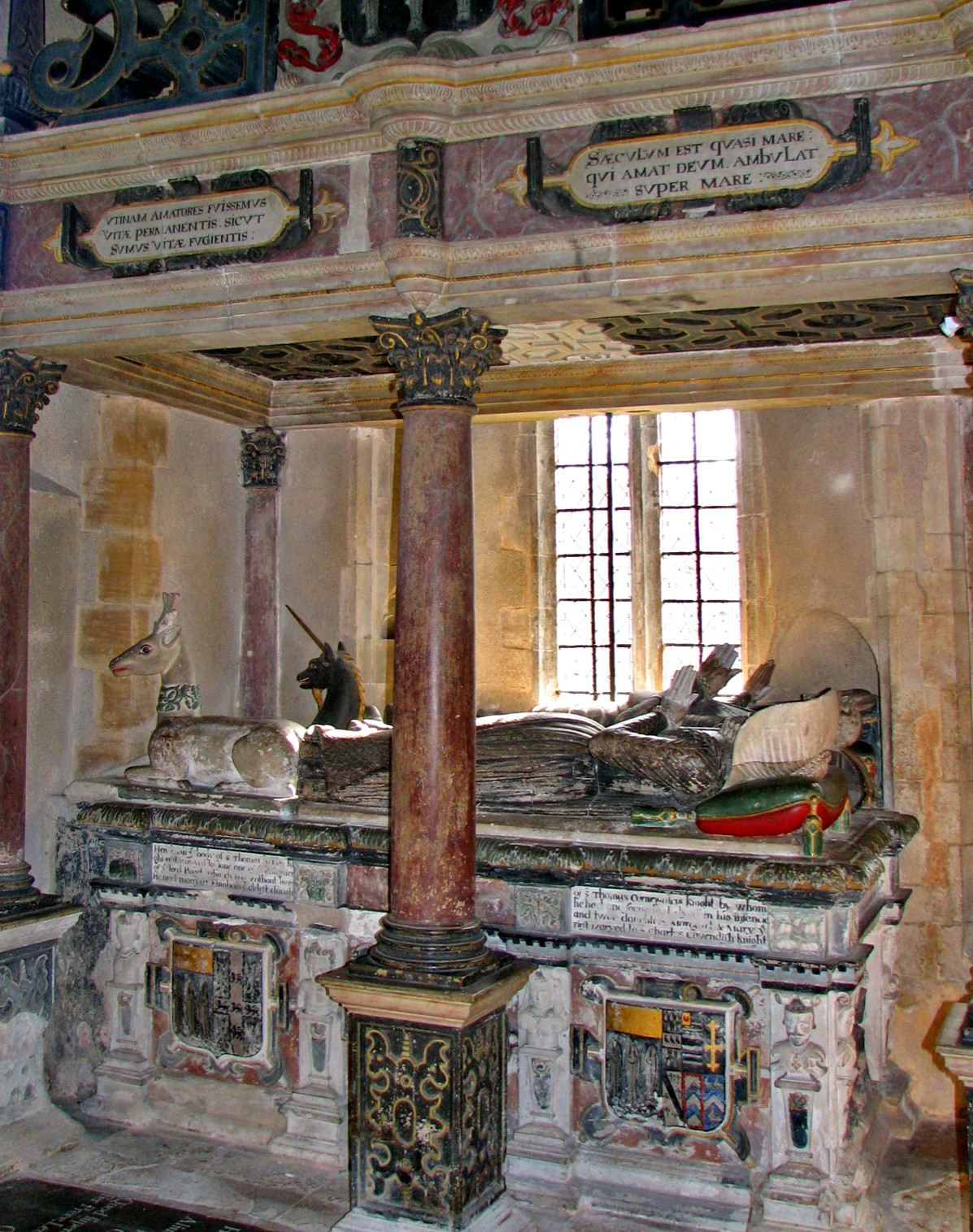
Lady Elizabeth Kitson, Sir Thomas Kytson and his first wife. Monument in Hengrave church

She married Sir Thomas Kitson (1540–1603) who was the heir of Sir Thomas Kitson. He had just lost his first wife of only a year. Elizabeth had a dowry of £600 and she took on the management of the family seat of Hengrave Hall.

Lady Elizabeth and her husband were keen on music and employed resident musicians Edward Johnson and twenty years his junior the madrigalist John Wilbye. In addition they created collections of instruments and sheet music. Wilbye would publish 64 pieces of music which are extant whilst she was his patron. She played the lute.

Philip Gawdy wrote that she was ill in 1593 and when she recovered danced all night in token of thanksgiving. In October 1605 she told Gawdy that his nephew had made the acquaintance of an unsuitable woman, Mistress Havers.

She established two charitable gifts and these charities are still running as of 2020. The first in 1625 was for £30 each year to create houses for the poor and the following year she gave another £4 per year to provide clothing for the poor.

== Death and legacy ==
On the death of Elizabeth Kitson in 1628 the music collections and the house were inherited by her daughter Mary Kitson, who married Thomas Darcy, 1st Earl Rivers. Elizabeth had requested that her funeral should be free of pomp and should be either very early or late in the day. She was buried at Hengrave church and her statue was added to that of her husband and his first wife in a large memorial that she had commissioned in 1608.

The tradition of music at Hengrave Hall continued. In 2020 a sponsored concert was scheduled for Hengrave, particularly as it was the workplace of John Wilbye.
