= Thomas Pakington =

Sir Thomas Pakington (c. 1530–1571) of Hampton, Worcestershire, was knighted by Queen Mary on 2 October 1553 and was Sheriff of Worcester in 1561.

== Biography ==
Thomas Pakington was the son of Robert Pakington, a London mercer and an M.P. for the City in 1534, who was murdered in London in 1536. Thomas inherited from his mother, Agnes (or Katharine), daughter of Sir John Baldwin (died 1545), large estates in and near Aylesbury in Buckinghamshire, and was also heir to his uncle, Sir John Pakington.

Pakington was knighted by Queen Mary on 2 October 1553, and was sheriff of Worcester in 1561. He died at Bath Place, Holborn, on 2 June 1571, and was buried at Aylesbury on the 12th.

== Family ==
Pakington married Dorothy (1531–1577), daughter of Sir Thomas Kitson (1485–1540), by whom he had two daughters and one son, John Pakington (1549–1625).

His widow Dorothy, who was his sole executrix, acquired some celebrity by her interference in electioneering matters. On 4 May 1572 she issued a writ in her own name as "lord and owner of the town of Aylesbury", appointing burgesses for the constituency. She afterwards married Thomas Tasburgh of Hawridge in Buckinghamshire, and died 2 May 1577.
