= Thomas Cornwallis (died 1604) =

English politician

The Right Honourable Sir Thomas Cornwallis PC JP

Comptroller of the Household
- In office December 1557 – 17 November 1558
- Monarch: Mary I
- Preceded by: Robert Rochester
- Succeeded by: Thomas Parry

Treasurer of Calais
- In office April 1554 – December 1557
- Monarch: Mary I
- Preceded by: Maurice Denys
- Succeeded by: Office abolished
Parliamentary offices
Member of Parliament for Suffolk
In office January 1558 – 17 November 1558 Serving with William Drury
| Preceded by | Henry Jerningham |
| Succeeded by | Owen Hopton |
In office 23 January 1552 – 15 April 1552 Serving with Anthony Wingfield
| Preceded by | Thomas Wentworth |
| Succeeded by | Henry Bedingfeld |
Member of Parliament for Grampound
In office April 1554 – 5 May 1554 Serving with Richard Chappell
| Preceded by | William Smythwick |
| Succeeded by | George Tedlowe |
Member of Parliament for Gatton
In office October 1553 – 5 December 1553 Serving with Chidiock Paulet
| Preceded by | Richard Southwell/Darcy |
| Succeeded by | Thomas Gatacre |

Personal details
- Born: 1518 or 1519 Brome, Suffolk, England
- Died: 27 December 1604 (aged 85–86) Brome, Suffolk, England
- Spouse: Anne Jerningham
- Children: 6, including Elizabeth, William, and Charles
- Relatives: Henry Cornwallis (brother)

Sir Thomas Cornwallis (1518/1519 – 27 December 1604) was an English politician.

== Family ==
Thomas Cornwallis was the eldest son of Sir John Cornwallis (c. 1491–1544) of Brome, Suffolk, Steward of the household of the future King Edward VI during the years 1538–1544, by his wife, Mary Sulyard, daughter of Edward Sulyard of Otes, Essex.

== Career ==
Cornwallis was appointed High Sheriff of Norfolk and Suffolk for 1552–53 and made a Privy Councillor in Aug. 1553. He was the last Treasurer of Calais from April 1554 to December 1557 and Comptroller of the Household from December 1557 to November 1558.

He was elected a member (MP) of the parliament of England for Suffolk in 1547 and 1558, for Gatton in October 1553 and Grampound in April 1554.

== Marriage and issue ==
Cornwallis married, by 1540, Anne Jerningham, the daughter of Sir John Jerningham of Somerleyton, Suffolk, and Bridget Drury, the daughter of Sir Robert Drury of Hawstead, Suffolk, by whom he had two sons, Sir Charles Cornwallis and Sir William Cornwallis, and four daughters, including Elizabeth Cornwallis, the second wife of Sir Thomas Kitson (1540–1603), son and heir of Sir Thomas Kitson (died 1540).
