= Brington =

Brington may refer to:

- Brington, Cambridgeshire, a village the Huntingdonshire district of Cambridgeshire, England
- Brington, Northamptonshire, the civil parish in the Daventry district of Northamptonshire, England
  - Great Brington, a village in the civil parish of Brington, Northamptonshire
  - Little Brington, a village in the civil parish of Brington, Northamptonshire
