= Althorp =

Stately home and estate in Althorp, England

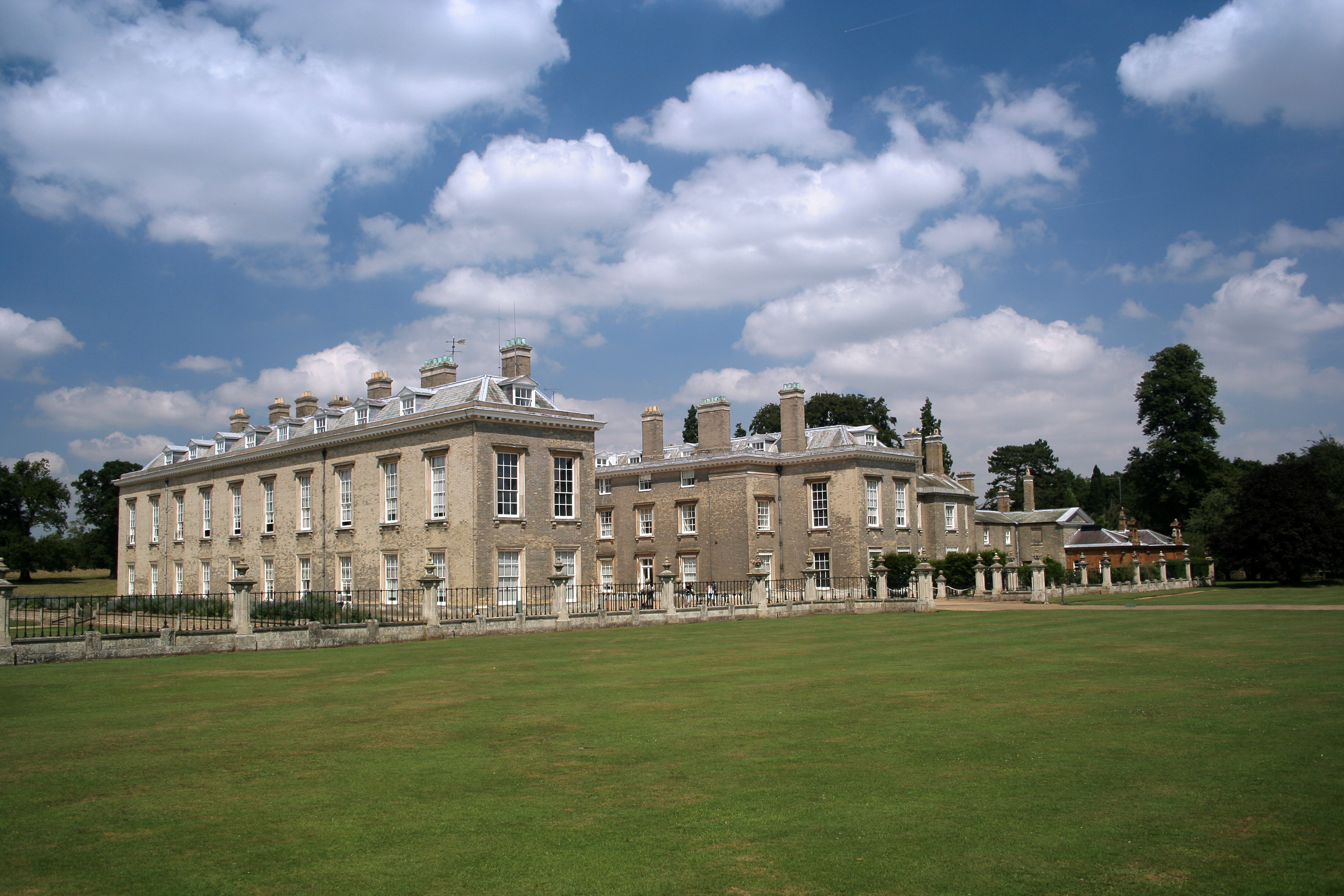
- Althorp in July 2006

- Location within Northamptonshire
- 52°16′49″N 1°00′07″W
- Location: Althorp, Northamptonshire

History
- Rebuilt: 1688

Site notes
- Owner: Spencer family

Althorp (pronounced /ˈɔːlθɔːrp/ AWL-thorp or /ˈɔːltrəp/ AWL-trup, see pronunciation) is a Grade I listed stately home and estate in the civil parish of Althorp, in West Northamptonshire, England of about 13,000 acres (5,300 ha). (Note: Sources differ on the exact size of the estate, but most state 13,000 or 14,000 acres. The official website claims 13,000 acres, but Paprocki and others mention 14,000.) By road it is about 6 miles (9.7 km) northwest of the county town of Northampton and about 75 miles (121 km) northwest of central London, situated between the villages of Great Brington and Harlestone. It has been held by the Spencer family for more than 500 years, and has been owned by Charles Spencer, 9th Earl Spencer since 1992. It was also the home of Lady Diana Spencer (later Princess of Wales) from her parents' divorce until her marriage to Charles, Prince of Wales (later King Charles III).

Althorp is mentioned as a small hamlet in the Domesday Book of 1086 as "Olletorp", and by 1377 it had become a village with a population of more than fifty people. By 1505 there were no longer any tenants living there, and in 1508, John Spencer purchased Althorp estate with the funds generated from his family's sheep-rearing business. Althorp became one of the prominent stately homes in England. The house dates to 1688, replacing an earlier house that was once visited by Charles I. The Spencer family amassed an extensive art collection and other valuable household items. During the 18th century, the house became a major cultural hub in England, and parties were regularly held, attracting many prominent members of Great Britain's ruling class. George John, 2nd Earl Spencer, who owned Althorp between 1783 and his death in 1834, developed one of the largest private libraries in Europe at the palace, which grew to over 100,000 books by the 1830s. (Note: Various sources differ on how many volumes Althorp had at its peak, although most agree it was one of the most sizable private collections in Europe at the time. A number of sources conservatively state 33,000 to 40,000 volumes, but Charles Spencer's Althorp: A Story of an English Country House (1998) estimates 110,000 upon John's death in 1834, sprawling across at least five rooms from floor to ceiling, and notes that the collection had grown so massive that books were also being stored in rooms like the Picture Gallery on the upper floor.) After falling on hard times, John Spencer, 5th Earl Spencer, known as the Red Earl, in 1892 sold much of the collection to Enriqueta Rylands, who was building the University of Manchester Library. Many of Althorp's furnishings were sold during the twentieth century, and between 1975 and 1992 alone approximately 20% of the contents were auctioned.

The house at Althorp was a "classically beautiful" red brick Tudor building, but its appearance was radically altered, starting in 1788, when the architect Henry Holland was commissioned to make extensive changes. Mathematical tiles were added to the exterior, encasing the brick, and four Corinthian pilasters were added to the front. The grand hall entrance to the house, Wootton Hall, (Note: The hall is also spelled Wooten or Wooton in various sources.) was cited by Sir Nikolaus Pevsner as "the noblest Georgian room in the county". The great dining room in the east wing extension of the house was added in 1877 to designs by John Macvicar Anderson, its walls hung with faded, red damask silk. Numerous fireplaces and furnishings were brought to Althorp from Spencer House in London during the Blitz for safekeeping and still remain. The Picture Gallery stretches for 115 feet (35 m) on the first floor of the west wing, and is one of the best remaining examples of the original Tudor oak woodwork and ambiance in the mansion. It has an extensive collection of portraits, including Anthony van Dyck's War and Peace, a John de Critz portrait of James I, a Mary Beale portrait of Charles II, and many others. Some £2 million was spent on redecorating the palace in the 1980s, during which time most of the religious paintings of Althorp were sold.

In total, the grounds of Althorp estate contain 28 listed buildings and structures, including nine planting stones. The former falconry, now a Grade I listed building, was built in 1613. Gardener's House is listed as a Grade II* listed building in its own right, as are the Grade II listed West and East Lodges. The mustard-yellow Grade II* listed stable block, designed by architect Roger Morris with a Palladian influence, was ordered by Charles, 5th Earl of Sunderland in the early 1730s. The French landscape architect André Le Nôtre was commissioned to lay out the park and grounds in the 1660s, and further alterations were made during the late 18th century under Henry Holland. Following the death of Diana, Princess of Wales in 1997, she was interred on a small island in the middle of the ornamental Round Oval lake. A Doric-style temple with Diana's name inscribed on top, situated across from the lake, is a tourist attraction during July and August when the house and estate are open to the public, although the exhibition centre, situated in the old stable block, closed permanently in 2013.

== Etymology ==
A manor existed at Althorp in medieval times. It was referred to in the Domesday Book as "Olletorp", meaning Olla's Thorp, believed to refer to a medieval lord named Olla. Thorp is a word of Scandinavian origin, which would have been pronounced as "throop" or "thrupp", and in Danish probably meant "daughter's settlement". In the 13th and 15th centuries it was recorded as "Holtropp" and "Aldrop", although when the estate was bought by John Spencer in 1508 it began to be referred to as "Oldthorpe".

=== Pronunciation ===
The name today is properly pronounced as "awl-trupp", which is not officially recognised on paper and by the media. The current owner, Charles Spencer, (Note: With the exception of the documenting of Charles Spencer, 3rd Duke of Marlborough and Charles Spencer, 3rd Earl of Sunderland in the history section in this article, unless otherwise stated, Charles Spencer will be used to refer to the current owner Charles Spencer, 9th Earl Spencer.) said that his father insisted on pronouncing it as "awl-trupp," which is the pronunciation used by the Spencer family. When he assumed ownership in 1992, the BBC Pronunciation Department contacted him and the pronunciation "awl-thorp" was agreed upon.

== History ==
=== Early history ===
A hamlet named Althorp existed here in medieval times, believed to have been situated on the southwest side of the park, east of West Lodge. It was first mentioned in the Domesday Book of 1086 as having a population of ten at the time, and being part of the parish of Brington. It was officially designated as an "extra parochial district" for centuries under the New Bottle Grove Hundred of Brington, but by 1874 it was being cited as an independent civil parish. (Note: In the History, Gazetteer, and Directory of Northamptonshire, William Whellan was still describing it as an extra parochial district in 1849, but in an 1874 edition, Francis Whellan mentions that it was "now an independent parish".) 21 residents were documented in 1327, and in 1377 fifty people were reported to have paid Poll Tax over the age of 14. During the 15th century the population of the village diminished, and in 1505 there were no longer any tenants living there. By 1577 most of the land was converted into four substantial sheep pastures.

In 1469 John Spencer's uncle – also named John Spencer – had become feoffee (feudal lord) of Wormleighton in Warwickshire and a tenant at Althorp in Northamptonshire in 1486. The family's administration of their Northamptonshire and Warwickshire estates gained them admiration and a following throughout England, and their sheep-rearing business earned large profits. After beginning construction of Wormleighton Manor the previous year with some 60 relatives, John Spencer bought Althorp in 1508 for £800 from the Catesby family. At the time Spencer was also lord of the manors of Fenny Compton, Stoneton, Nobottle, Great Brington, Little Brington, Harlestone, Glassthorpe, Flore, Wicken, Wyke Hamon, Upper Boddington, Lower Boddington and Hinton, and owned numerous other properties. The park took some four years to establish, with 300 acres of grassland, 100 acres of woodland and 40 acres of water.

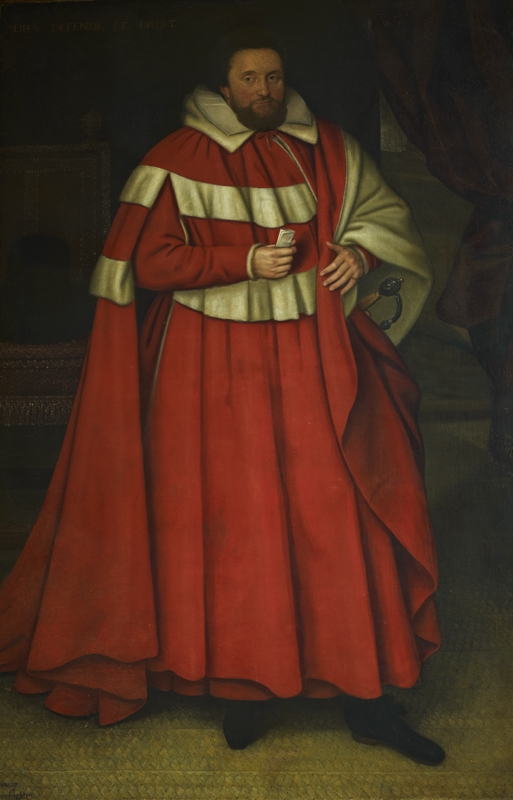
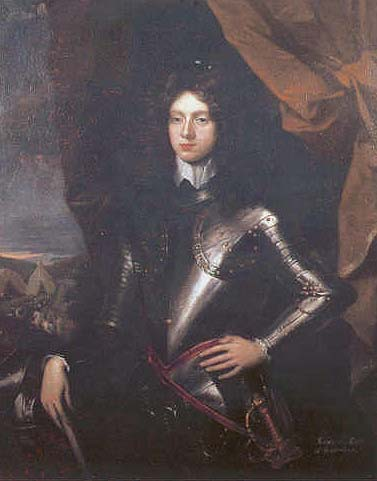
Left: Sir Robert Spencer, 1st Baron Spencer of Wormleighton. Right: Henry Spencer, 1st Earl of Sunderland

When John Spencer died in 1522, he passed the estate to his youngest son, Sir William Spencer, High Sheriff of Northamptonshire, who held it until his death in 1532. Only a boy at the time of William's death, his son John Spencer inherited Althorp and held it until his death in 1586, when he passed it to his son, also John, who died in 1600. John's son, Robert, was created the 1st Baron Spencer of Wormleighton on 21 July 1603. Anne of Denmark and Prince Henry came to Althorp on 25 June 1603 from Dingley Hall on their way to Windsor from Edinburgh. She was welcomed by an entertainment scripted by Ben Jonson in which the Fairy Queen Mab gave her a jewel, and she was celebrated as "Oriana". Lady Anne Clifford described the "infinite number of lords of ladies" who came to see the new queen on Sunday. On Monday, she moved on to Easton Neston.

King Charles I is documented to have visited Althorp during his reign. The drawing room was built and the main hall enlarged for the occasion, with £1,300 spent on the banquet, an exorbitant sum for the period, equivalent to £256,400 in 2025. (Note: The feast was extravagant, including 6 barrels of oysters, 140 apricots, over 50 fishes including pike, perch, bream and tench, 14 swans, 40 pheasants, 26 partridges, 39 turkeys, 46 rabbits, 26 pigs, 73 redshanks, 100 quails, 39 dozen larks, 500 wild pigeons and 300 tame pigeons, 26 young herons, 72 gulls, 3,350 eggs, 560 pounds of butter, 14 dozen artichokes, 20 cauliflowers, 2 firkins of cider, 2 hogsheads of sherry, 1 hogshead of white wine, and 40 hogsheads of beer, and more.) Upon Robert Spencer's death in 1627 Althorp devolved to William Spencer, 2nd Baron Spencer of Wormleighton who held it until his death in 1636. William's eldest son, Henry Spencer, 1st Earl of Sunderland, known as The Lord Spencer between 1636 and June 1643, fought in the Battle of Edgehill in 1642 and was rewarded for his services on 8 June 1643 when the title of Earl of Sunderland was bestowed upon him, although the title cost him £3,000. He then fought in the siege of Gloucester in August 1643 and the First Battle of Newbury on 20 September 1643, where he was killed, aged 23, by a cannonball.

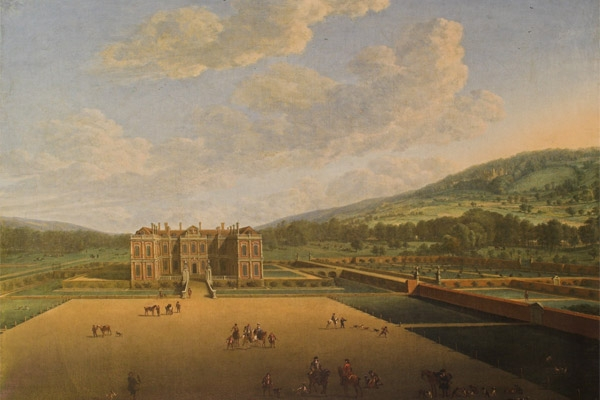
Althorp in 1677 by Johannes Vorstermans

Following Henry's death, the estate passed to his eldest son Robert Spencer, 2nd Earl of Sunderland, just two years of age at the time. Cosimo III visited Althorp in 1669, documenting it in his Travels of Cosmo III. Grand Duke of Tuscany, through England, in 1669. Robert built the current house in 1688 and made a series of changes to Althorp park. However, Robert's bad temper and his reputation as a ruthless advocate of absolute monarchy made him numerous enemies, and he was forced to leave the country and flee to the Netherlands the same year. He later underwent a political rehabilitation, becoming Lord Chamberlain of the Household in April 1697 and Lord Justice for a short period before retiring from public life in December of that year, after which he lived a secluded life at Althorp until his death in 1702. Robert passed Althorp to his son, Charles Spencer, 3rd Earl of Sunderland, who held it for twenty years. Described by John Evelyn as "a youth of extraordinary hopes," Charles inherited his father's passion for intrigue and repellent manners, and from his early years he had a great love of books, spending his leisure and his wealth in expanding the library at Althorp. Charles's second marriage to Anne Churchill, daughter of John Churchill, 1st Duke of Marlborough and Sarah Churchill, Duchess of Marlborough in 1700 was an important alliance for the Spencers and for his descendants; through it he was introduced to political life, and later the dukedom of Marlborough came to the Spencers. In 1722 he was implicated in what became known as the Atterbury Plot, to restore the House of Stuart, and his death was one of the factors which brought the Plot to light. Althorp was then occupied by his son Robert Spencer, 4th Earl of Sunderland, who died childless in 1729. As a result, his brother, Charles, became 5th Earl of Sunderland, and subsequently 3rd Duke of Marlborough after the death of his aunt, Henrietta Godolphin (née Churchill), 2nd Duchess of Marlborough. Charles later led the naval descent on the French coastal port of St Malo during the Seven Years' War, after passing Althorp to the 3rd Earl's son, John Spencer, in January 1733. John Spencer, along with Charles and Thomas Coram, William Hogarth and others, was involved in the charter of the Foundling Hospital. Upon his death in 1746, John passed his estates to his son John, only 12 years of age at the time, beneficiary to the greatest inheritance in the kingdom at the time with an income of almost £30,000 a year.

=== Social and cultural hub ===
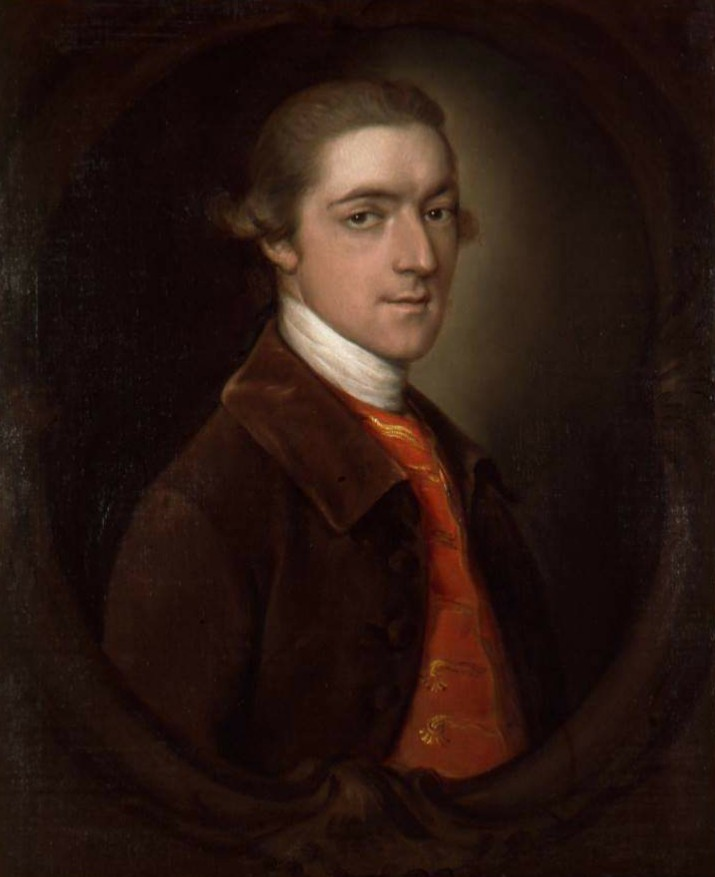
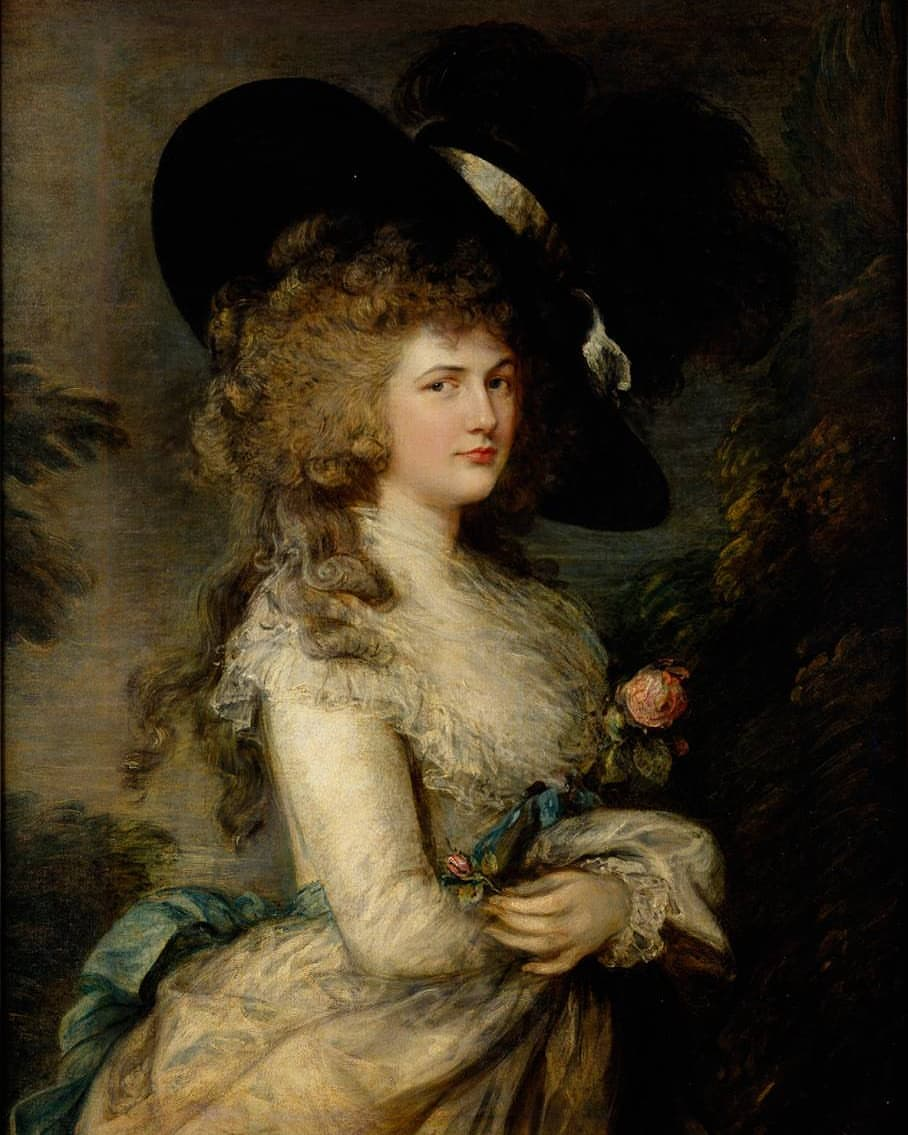
John Spencer, 1st Earl Spencer and his daughter Georgiana Cavendish, Duchess of Devonshire were noted for their lavish spending and social connections

John served as Member of Parliament for Warwick from 1756 to 1761. He was renowned for his heavy spending on his political pursuits and campaigns, "indulging in the fiercely competitive and heinously expensive business of fighting elections to Parliament – which effectively meant bribing people to vote for his candidate rather than that of another magnate". He spent £120,000 in one campaign alone and spent heavily on his estates, building Spencer House in London. He also wore expensive fashionable attire such as "diamond-buckled shoes". Althorp frequently hosted parties attended by the political and cultural elite, and it became known as a place of indulgence and festivities. At dinners and picnics in the gardens, John hired musicians to play French horns and organised unusual spectacles to entertain guests, such as a "Hooray Henry Olympics", as Charles Spencer calls it, with a donkey race for Lord Fordwick, dance competitions offering a guinea as the first prize, and sack races with the first prize of 30 shillings. The Christmas of 1755 was a grand affair. John celebrated his 21st birthday with a ball at the house on 20 December during which he secretly married 18-year-old Margaret Georgiana Poyntz; the couple did not inform anyone for several days. Around 5,000 guests were invited to a celebration party organised by the Spencers in a shed on the village green in the nearby village of Brington, consuming some 11,000 pints of beer. Althorp was "buzzing with activity", and France's top chefs were brought to Althorp to cater for the family and their guests during the week. He was created Baron Spencer of Althorp and Viscount Spencer by George III on 3 April 1761, and on 1 November 1765, he was given the title Viscount Althorp and made the first Earl Spencer. He was also High Steward of St Albans in 1772 and Mayor of St Albans in 1779. John's daughter, Georgiana Cavendish, Duchess of Devonshire, was also known for her liberal spending, and although she became one of Britain's most prominent socialites in the late 18th century, with many political and literary connections, she suffered from a gambling addiction and had an eating disorder.

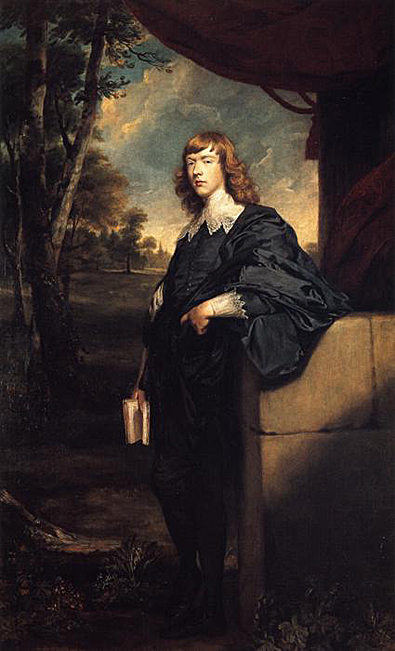
George John, 2nd Earl Spencer, by Sir Joshua Reynolds

John's son George John, 2nd Earl Spencer inherited Althorp after his father's death in 1783. He served as Whig MP for Northampton from 1780 to 1782 and for Surrey from 1782 to 1783 before accepting the title of 2nd Earl Spencer. He was later Home Secretary from 1806 to 1807 under Lord Grenville in the Ministry of All the Talents. Extremely interested in literary pursuits, he developed one of the largest private libraries in Europe at Althorp. He was the instigator and first President of the Roxburghe Club (an exclusive bibliophilic club), founded in 1812, President of the Royal Institution from 1813 to 1827, and Commissioner of the Public Records in 1831, among other literary pursuits. In later life, his collecting habit had become an obsession, and he attempted to collect every volume ever published in Britain. Such was his desire to obtain as complete a collection as possible, that when Napoleon instigated the secularisation of religious houses in south Germany, Spencer used the local British agent and Benedictine monk, Alexander Horn to acquire many of their rare books and manuscripts. Althorp became a major cultural hub of England during his time; at one Christmas, the actor David Garrick, the historian Edward Gibbon, the playwright Richard Brinsley Sheridan and the painter Joshua Reynolds, among other artistic figures attended a party there together. However, George John's spending became problematic for the Spencers, especially as at the time they were feeling the impact of the agricultural depressions brought on by the Napoleonic Wars. By the time of his death in 1834 he had amassed a debt of £500,000, which he passed onto his son, John Spencer, 3rd Earl Spencer.

The 3rd Earl became an active statesman, serving as Chancellor of the Exchequer under Lord Grey and Lord Melbourne from 1830 to 1834. Along with Lord John Russell, he led the fight to pass the Reform Bill of 1832, making more than twenty speeches, and is generally considered responsible for its victory. Despite his debts, in respect for his father, John managed to retain the massive book collection, and also continue to run the other Spencer houses at Wimbledon and Spencer House in London, as well as his farm in Wiseton and shooting retreat in Norfolk. He achieved this mainly by far less extravagant living, spending much of the year at Wiseton where the running costs were £1,200 compared with the £5,000 needed to run Althorp and pay the staff of 40 in the house. As a result, Althorp was largely abandoned during the late 1830s and early 1840s. John also leased out his lands and gardens and sold land in Buckinghamshire and Bedfordshire, repaying all the debt by the time of his death in 1845, and beginning to run his properties at a profit. His son Frederick Spencer, 4th Earl Spencer, who owned Althorp from 1845 until his death in 1857, also retained the collection.

John Spencer, 5th Earl Spencer, known as the Red Earl, inherited Althorp in 1857. He served as a Liberal Party politician and was a close friend of British prime minister William Gladstone, who he served under in all four of his cabinets. Although politically successful, John fell into hard times financially and was forced to eventually sell much of the enormous library collection in 1892 to Enriqueta Rylands, who was building the University of Manchester Library. After dying childless in 1910, John passed Althorp to his half brother, Charles Spencer, 6th Earl Spencer, who served as Lord Chamberlain from 1905 to 1912 in the Liberal administrations headed by Sir Henry Campbell-Bannerman and H. H. Asquith.

=== Modern history ===
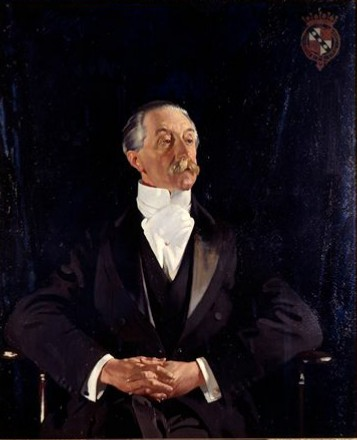
Charles Spencer, 6th Earl Spencer, who owned Althorp from 1910 until his death in 1922. Portrait by Sir William Orpen.

Times became more difficult for the Spencers by the late 19th century, and many of their assets had to be sold off. Albert Spencer, 7th Earl Spencer inherited the estate after his father Charles' death in 1922. Albert became a well-known art connoisseur and was a trustee of the Wallace Collection, chairman of the Royal School of Needlework, a Fellow of both the Society of Antiquaries of London and the Royal Society of Arts, and from 1961 until 1969 he was Chair of the Advisory Council of the Victoria and Albert Museum. Despite his keen interest in art, he began selling off paintings and other items to pay off debts. In the 1930s he was forced to sell off a small but immaculate Hans Holbein portrait of Henry VIII (now at the Thyssen-Bornemisza Museum, Madrid) for £10,000 to finance his son's education. Although a large sum at the time, by 1998 it was reputed to be worth around £50 million. Unlike many country houses in Britain during the Second World War which were occupied by the military and converted into hospitals, training camps and barracks, Althorp Palace remained untouched, thanks to Albert who saw to it that they used the stables instead. A Wellington bomber crashed near the ice house during the war, killing all of its crew. Due to Spencer House being in a dangerous location in London during the Blitz, many of the pieces of furniture and items of the house were brought to Althorp for safekeeping, including numerous fireplaces and doors with curled "S" doorknobs, a signature of the Spencer family dating to the 18th century.

The estate was first opened to the public in 1953 by Albert, to mitigate against taxation, and Althorp had its own railway station called Althorp Park on the Northampton Loop Line until 1960. After his death in 1975, Albert passed Althorp to his son Edward John, 8th Earl Spencer, who had served as Equerry to King George VI (1950–52) and to Queen Elizabeth II (1952–54). Edward was a wine connoisseur and had an extensive wine cellar at Althorp. He made his own wine and attracted fellow connoisseurs from around the world to Althorp, although he did not sell much of it. During Edward's ownership of Althorp approximately 20% of the furnishings of Althorp were sold off. The divestment included eleven Van Dykes and nearly every religious painting in the collection, as well as estate housing, and drew severe public criticism, including from the heir.

Edward left the estate to his son, the current owner Charles Spencer, 9th Earl Spencer, after his death in 1992. As a teenager, Charles served as a tour guide at the house and acquired a deep knowledge of Althorp. At the time he inherited the estate it was losing some £400,000 annually, and the staff of 14 had to be significantly reduced. Charles' older sister was Diana, Princess of Wales, who grew up with him at Althorp.

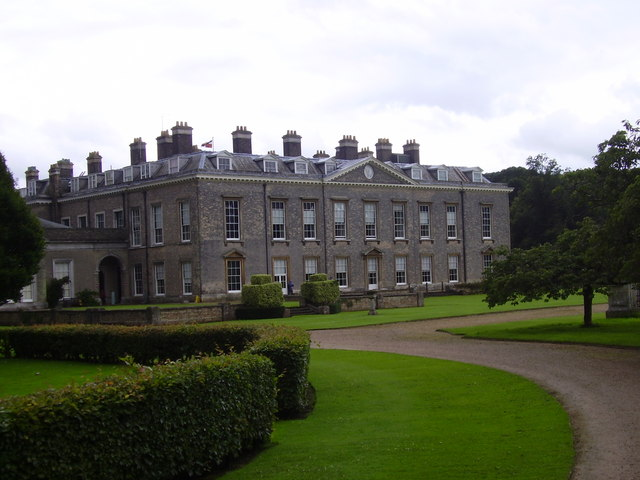
Althorp House in July 2007

Since the 1990s Charles Spencer has done much to increase the revenue earned by the estate to keep it running. The annual Althorp Literary Festival was founded in 2003. The heir apparent is Charles' son Louis Spencer, Viscount Althorp (born 1994). Charles has expressed concerns about the future of the estate and whether Louis might be forced to sell it. In 2005 Charles endorsed a furniture collection of replicas from the house, known as the Althorp Living History Collection.

In 2009 a major restoration of the roof, stonework and the mathematical tiles that clad the building was undertaken. Approximately £10 million was spent on repairing the roof alone. In 2010 an auction of over 700 items from Althorp's attics and cellars, as well as a Rubens and other notable works, achieved £21 million.

== Architecture and collections ==
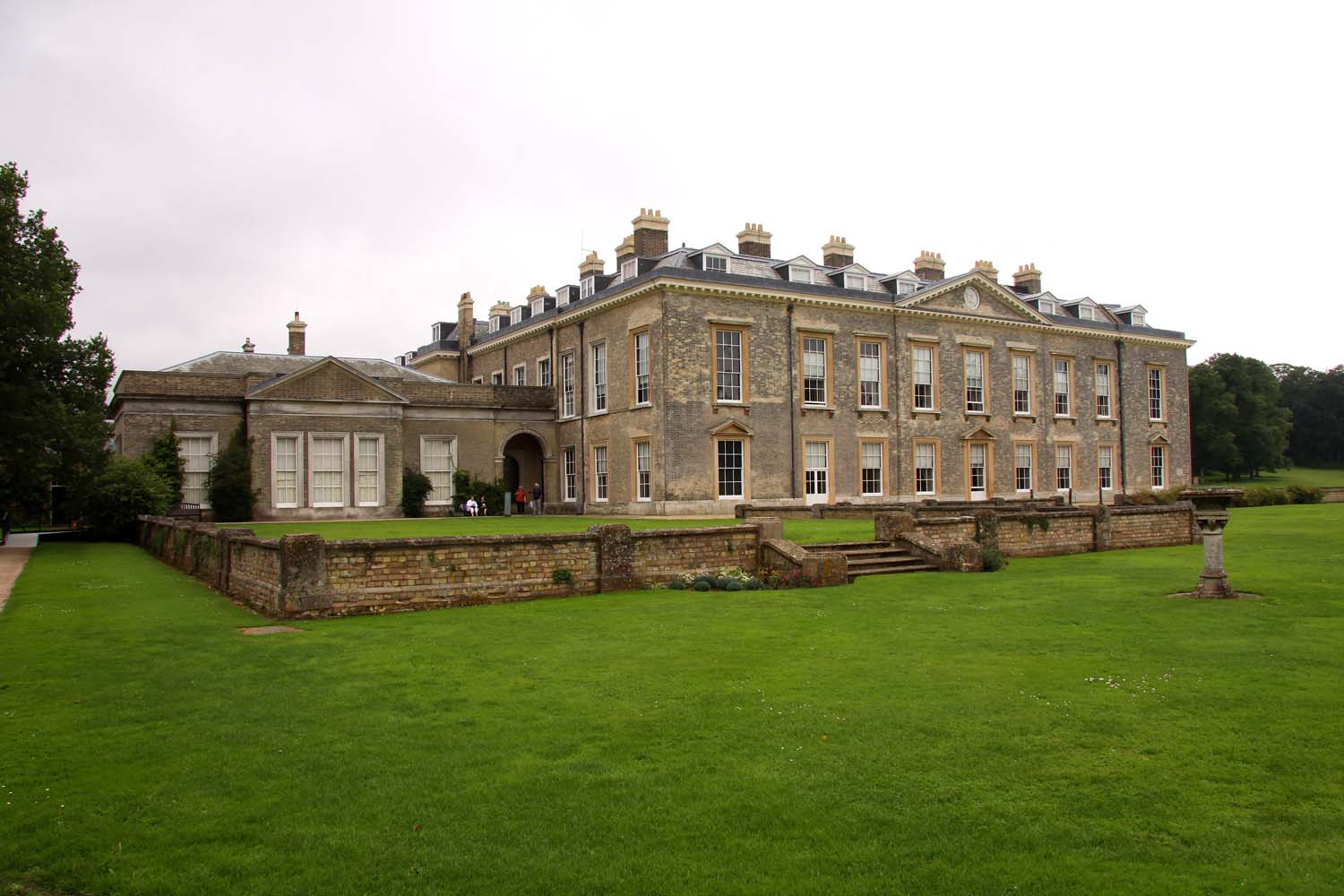
North (rear) elevation

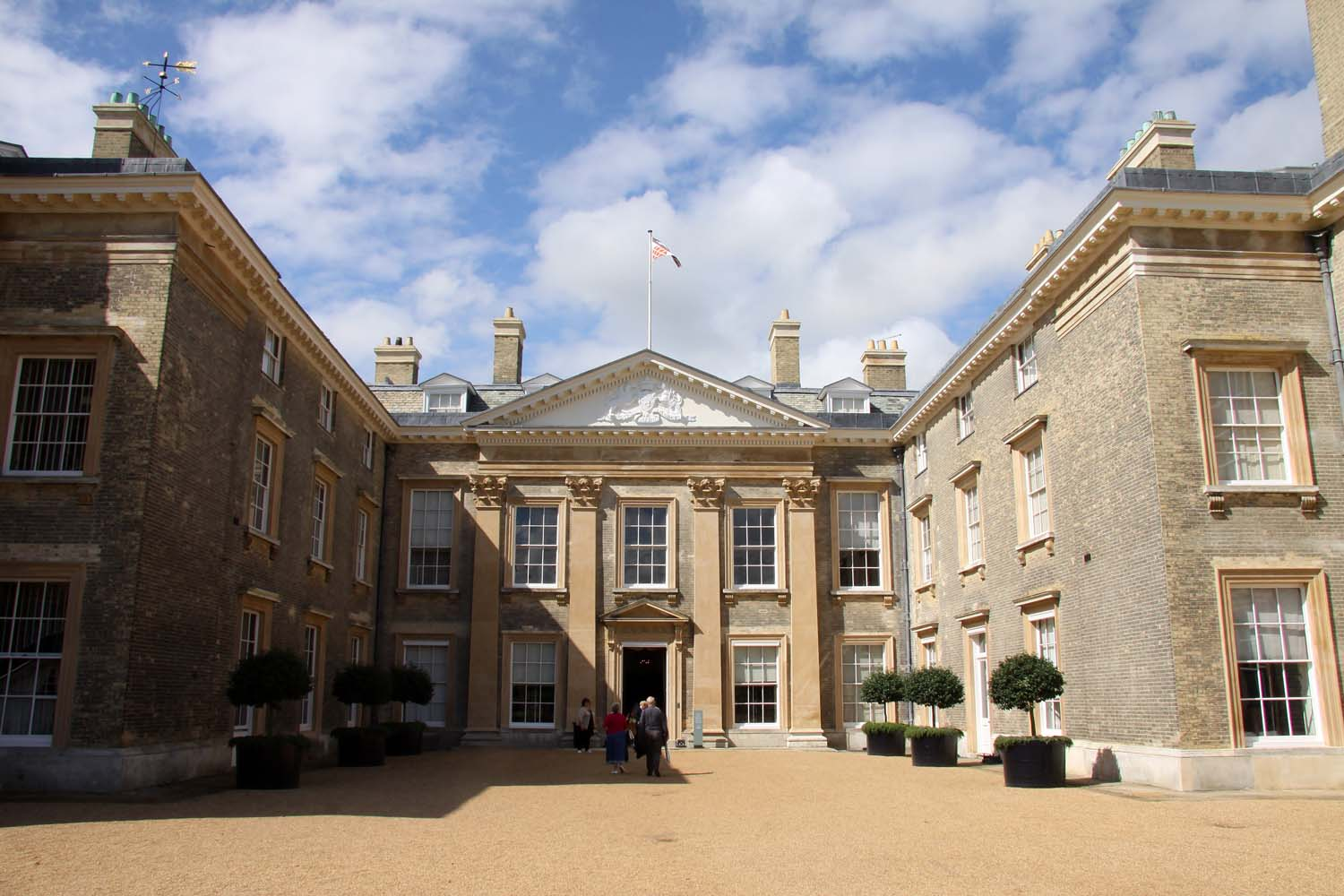
South (front) elevation

Althorp house is described as standing in a low situation, "approached by a handsome avenue, beautifully shaded with trees". The house was originally a "classically beautiful" red brick Tudor building, and a Johannes Vorstermans painting dated to 1677 shows a smaller red house at Althorp and Holdenby House in the distance to the far right. Cosmo III noted that the interior of Althorp house was strongly influenced by Italian architecture, and remarked that it "may be said to be the best planned, and best arranged country seat in the kingdom; for though there may be many which surpass it in size, none are superior to it in symmetrical elegance". The current building dates to 1688. Diarist John Evelyn described it that year: "The house, or rather palace, at Althorpe is a noble uniform pile in form of a half H, built of brick and freestone 'a la moderne'; the hall is well, the staircase excellent; the rooms of state, galleries, offices, and furniture, such as may become a great prince. It is situate in the midst of a garden, exquisitely planned and kept and all this in a park walled in with hewn stone, planted with rows and walks of trees, canals and fishponds and stored with game." Its appearance was radically altered in the 18th century when the architect Henry Holland was commissioned to make extensive changes starting in 1788. Mathematical tiles were added to the exterior, brought from Ipswich, encasing the old red brick, and four Corinthian pilasters, made from Roche Abbey stone in Yorkshire, were added to the front. The stone used to make the pilasters was reportedly intended by Christopher Wren to be used in the construction of St Paul's Cathedral. Sash windows with glazing bars and "moulded stone heads and surrounds" were added.

=== Interior ===
The interior of the palace is generally considered its strongest asset as the Spencer family has assembled an impressive collection of portrait art, including several pieces painted by the Flemish master Anthony van Dyck including War and Peace, the favourite of the 9th Earl Spencer, as well as countless valuable pieces of porcelain and furniture. One of the rooms in the estate is called the Queen Mary bedroom, which was used by Queen Mary and George V during their visit to the estate in 1913. Some £2 million was spent on redecorating the house in the 1980s by Raine, Countess Spencer. This work has been reversed, and the interior returned to its original grand but understated appearance.

==== Ground floor ====
===== Wootton Hall and saloon =====
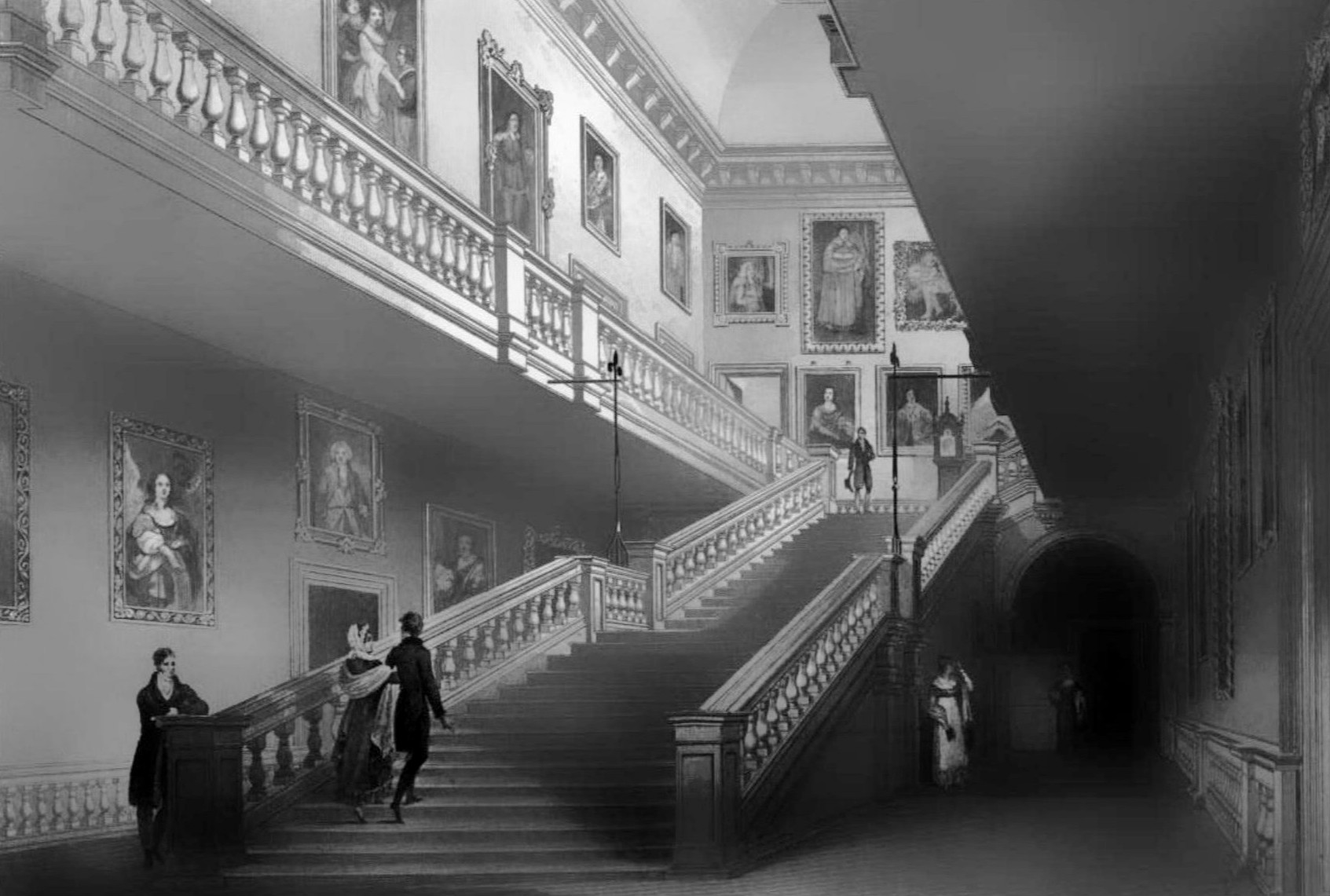
The staircase at Althorp House

Wootton Hall is the grand hall entrance on the central south side of Althorp house. "Perfectly proportioned" with a two-storey high ceiling, it was cited by Sir Nikolaus Pevsner as "the noblest Georgian room in the county". It takes its name from the painter John Wootton who was commissioned by the family in 1733 to paint a number of massive paintings in his Marylebone studio to reflect the family's love of equestrian pursuits, particularly fox hunting. At the time, Wootton was considered to be the finest painter of horses in the country. The paintings still hang on the walls. The hall has a substantial collection of artefacts collected over the years. Aside from the hall porter's chair, there is a dozen or so lavish-looking hall chairs, one of which is a sedan chair, rediscovered in the stable block in 1911, which had once been in Spencer House.

A prominent feature of the Wootton Hall is its pair of Italian black and Beschia marble blackamoor torchères, originally given to the First Duke of Marlborough as a present from General Charles Churchill. In exceptionally good condition, they stand either side of the door into the saloon. These were discovered in the silt of the River Tiber and are depictions of slaves who once served in a Roman household. Several flags stand above them, including the White Ensign. The ceiling is intricately made, featuring flowers in the plaster, each one different, the work of Colen Campbell in the early 18th century. The black and white check marble floor is also a distinguishing feature of the room, but through most of its history this floor would have been left plain as horses and carriages would enter the hall inside. In the mid-19th century Frederick, the 4th Earl, had laid down brown and blue tiles, replaced by the marble floor which was added by his son Robert in around 1910. The floor gives significant depth to the hall and provides fine acoustics, so much that Diana would once practice her tap dancing in the hall as a teenager.

Beyond the Wootton Hall is the saloon, which was converted from an inner courtyard and roofed in 1650 by Dorothy Spencer, Countess of Sunderland. The saloon was the first room at Althorp to have electricity installed, and it contains an imposing oak staircase, added in the 1660s. Cosmo III noted Althorp's "spacious staircase of the wood of the walnut tree, (Note: A likely error as the Spencers and other sources state the staircase is oak rather than walnut.) stained, constructed with great magnificence; this staircase, dividing itself into two equal branches, leads to the grand saloon, from which is the passage into the chambers, all of them regularly disposed after the Italian manner, to which country the Earl was indented for a model of the design." Historically, the staircase was painted white. It is described as being "surprisingly shallow and delightfully uneven – a physical manifestation of the long history of the house".

===== Sitting and drawing rooms =====
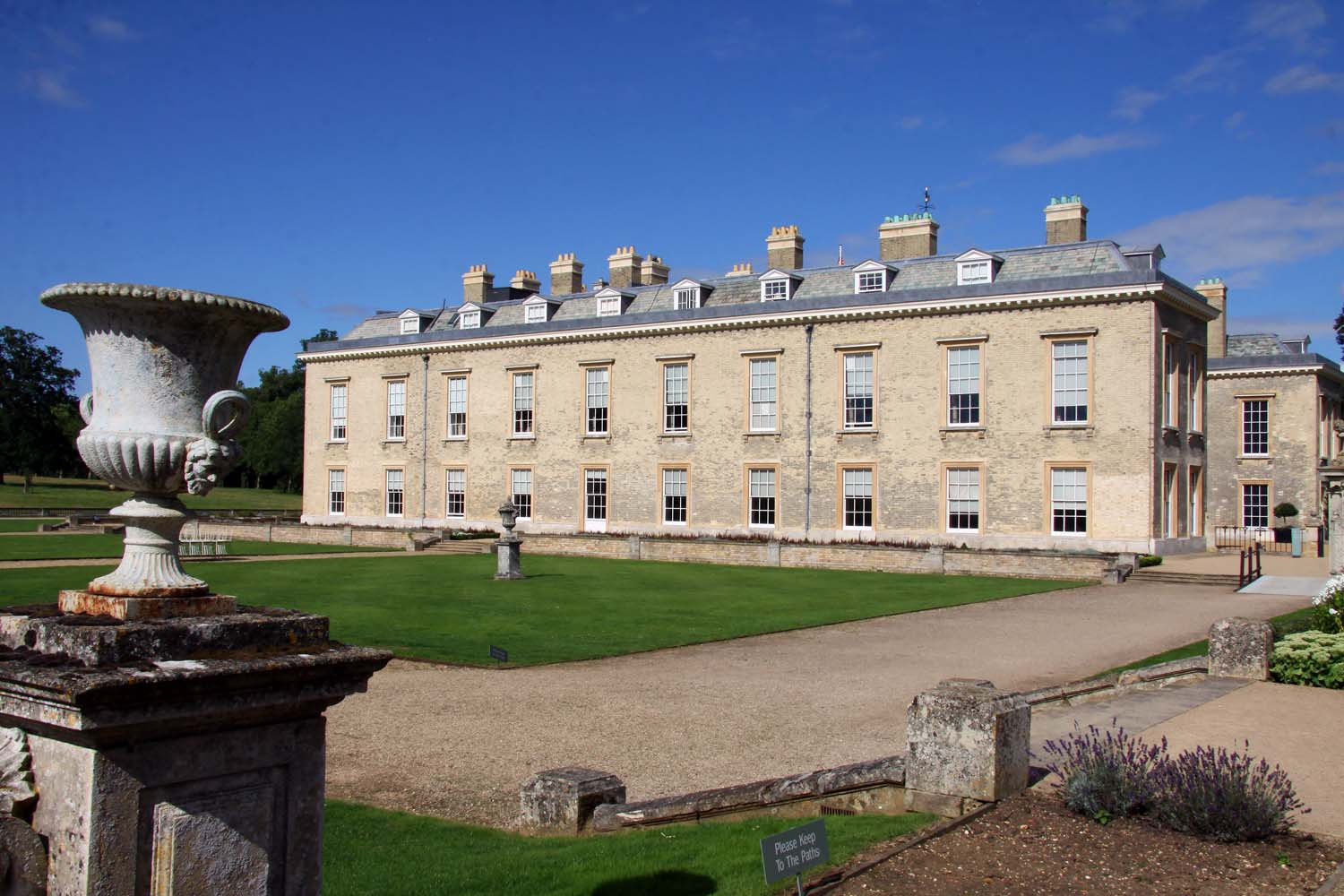
View of the side of Althorp House from the stables

The south drawing room is at the front of the house on the West Wing. In earlier times the room had served as a dining room, despite it being about as far from the kitchen as possible. This section of the house was largely remodelled under Henry Holland, but it retains its Georgian elegance today, "gilded to within an inch of its life", with walls painted in a duck egg blue colour with forest green drapery and peach-patterned sofas. A large mirror with an exquisite gold frame stands between the two windows. The fireplace was added by the Chelsea stonemason Lancelot Edward Wood in 1802, and the ceiling by master builder Benjamin Broadbent of Leicester in 1865. The ceiling in the yellow drawing room, also known as the Rubens room because of its four Rubens paintings, is also attributed to Broadbent. There are numerous paintings on the walls, including fifteen Joshua Reynolds portraits and a miniature portrait in one of the alcoves of Admiral Lord Nelson, an associate of George John, Second Earl Spencer. Although Higgerson, the night watchman, guarded the place from 8 pm to 8 am, in 1954 one of the lesser valuable paintings in the south drawing room was stolen in the night.

The grandmother's sitting room is situated at the front of the eastern wing. It is noted for its deep blue hand-painted frescoes and formal furniture, and was the favourite room of Charles and Diana's grandmother, Cynthia Spencer, Countess Spencer. Nearby was the Muniment room in which the Spencer family records were kept, described as a "musty apartment" which contained over 500 years of history, from medieval household accounts to letters from Jacobeans and accounts of Victorian house parties. The room was a favourite haunt of Spencer's grandfather, Albert Spencer, who would spend thousands of hours in it perusing over the family history. So guarded was he of the collection that when Winston Churchill once spent time in the room looking for information on his ancestor, John Churchill, 1st Duke of Marlborough (1650–1722), Albert immediately doused out his cigar in fear of creating a fire. The records were sold to the British Library in the 1980s, leaving the room empty, before it was converted to what is known as the "Steward's Room Flat". This part of the house once had an extensive collection of 1830s bull paintings by Richard Ansdell.

The Sutherland room lies at the rear east wing of the house and was once the bedroom of the Earl of Althorp in the first few centuries of the house when it was fashionable for the occupants to sleep on the ground floor and guests to sleep on the first floor. This was still the case during the Holland restoration, and as a result the room was ignored, so it retains many of the earlier mouldings not seen in many other parts of the house. It contains two fireplaces made by John Vardy and James Stuart which were originally situated in Spencer House, and the room has the original 17th-century cornice. The paintings in the room were selected by the current owner Charles Spencer to honour John, Third Earl Spencer and his passion for foxhunting. After it ceased usage as a bedroom, on special occasions the room would be full of life; on Christmas Day the room would be "transformed into a Christmas fairyland, with clockwork Santas, snowmen and angels all spinning and chiming in the candlelight". The children would have their places marked by a small cake with their names written on it in icing.

The Marlborough room, which contains the great parlour, is named after Sarah Churchill, Duchess of Marlborough, and is situated next to the Sunderland room and at left angles to the library. The Marlborough room served as an "uncomfortable" drawing room until the 1990s when a Victorian rosewood dining table accommodating for up to 42 people was added, with 'squiggle-back' chairs attributed to George Seddon in 1800. The new room was created after alterations were made to the large drawing room by the 6th Earl Spencer in 1911, including the removal of a dividing partition from the old billiard room. Part of the restoration work attributed to the 7th Earl Spencer after 1957 includes a replacement of two Victorian chimney pieces in the Marlborough room with those from Spencer House, one which was crafted by Peter Scheemakers. Portraits by Thomas Gainsborough, Joshua Reynolds, and George Romney, mostly of family members, adorn the walls, and accessions from the Spencer House are placed throughout.

Examples of paintings at Althorp

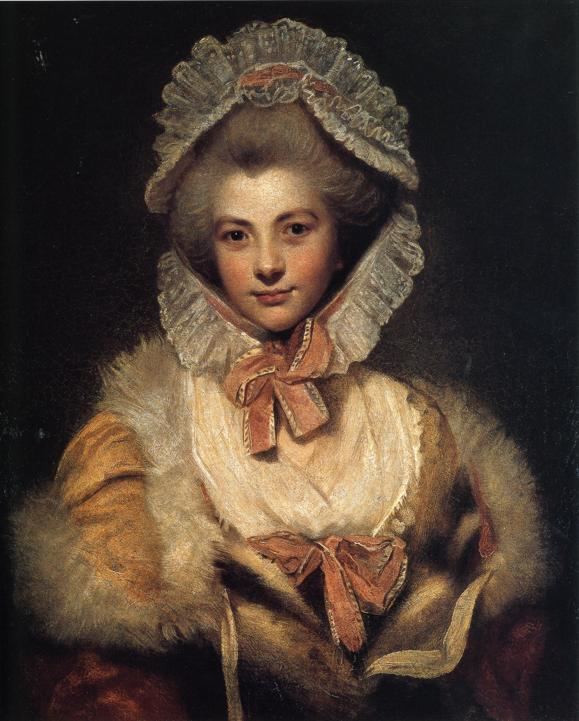
Portrait of Lavinia Bingham, Countess Spencer by Sir Joshua Reynolds (1781–1782)

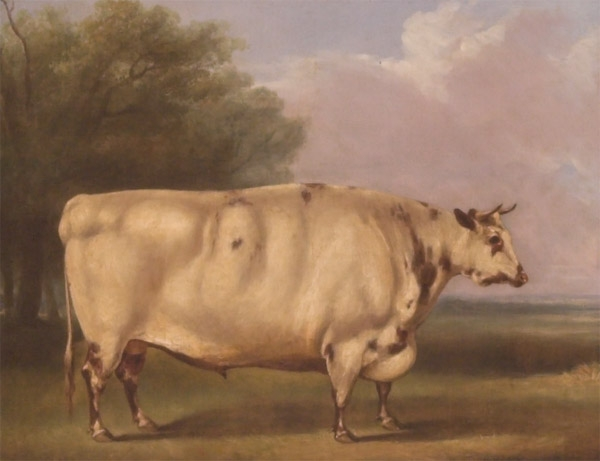
Shorthorn bull portrait by an unknown artist (before 1845)

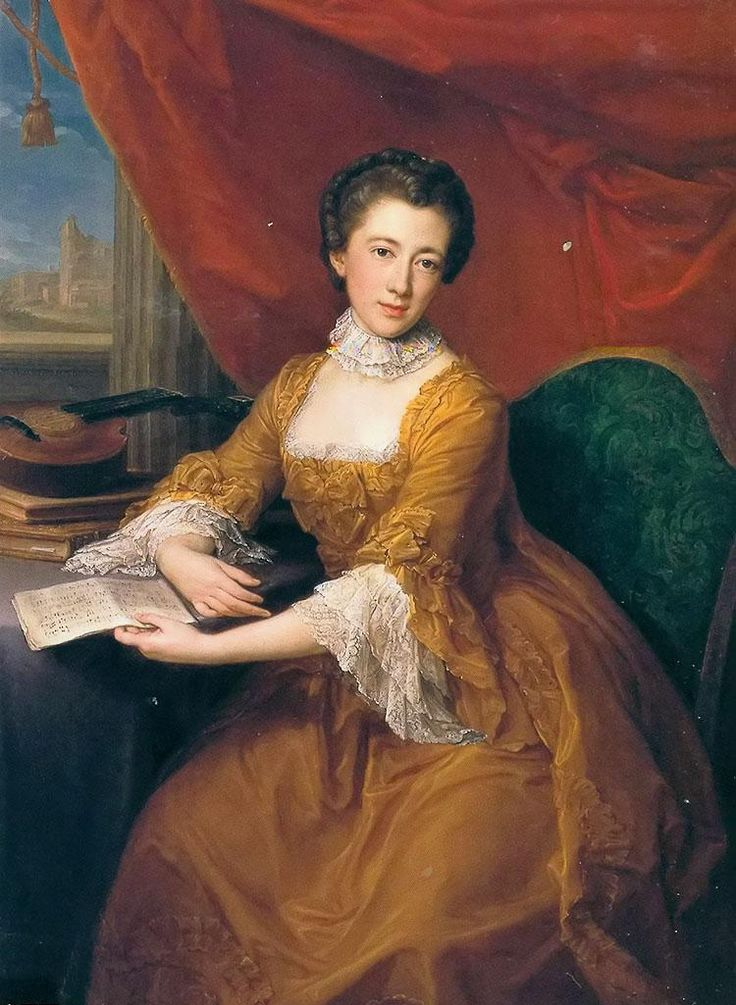
Portrait of Lady Margaret Georgiana Poyntz by Pompeo Batoni (c.1764)

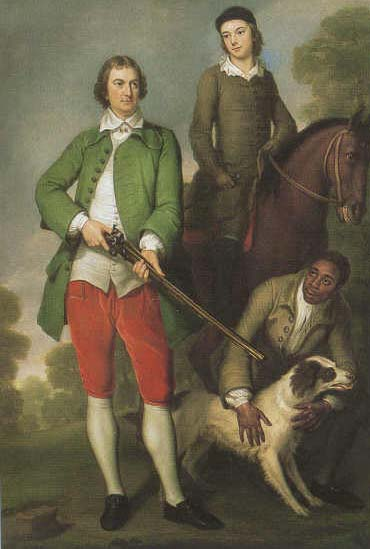
The Hon. John Spencer (1708–1746), his son the 1st Earl Spencer (1734–1783) and their servant, Caesar Shaw by George Knapton (c.1744)

===== Dining rooms =====
The great dining room is situated in the east wing extension of the house and was added in 1877 under J. MacVicar Anderson during the time of the Red Earl. The room was inspired by the ballroom of Buckingham Palace, with walls hung with faded, red damask silk. The Spencers ate their regular meals in the tapestry dining room, an inner room of the east side to the east of the Wooton Hall. Aside from the two fine vividly constructed tapestries, one of gypsies and one of farming, the room is fairly bleak in design compared to other rooms in the house; the dining table is relatively small, with a drab grey floor and open brick fireplace dated in large letters to 1683. The "sombre" oak panelling originally came from the family's other property of Wormleighton Manor in Warwickshire. Charles Spencer recalled that three generations of Spencers would eat their lunch together and that dining conditions were "silent, apart from the noises of my grandfather eating with great gusto, a napkin tucked in around his neck, hanging down over his popping-out tummy, and it was all very sad and tense".

===== Library =====
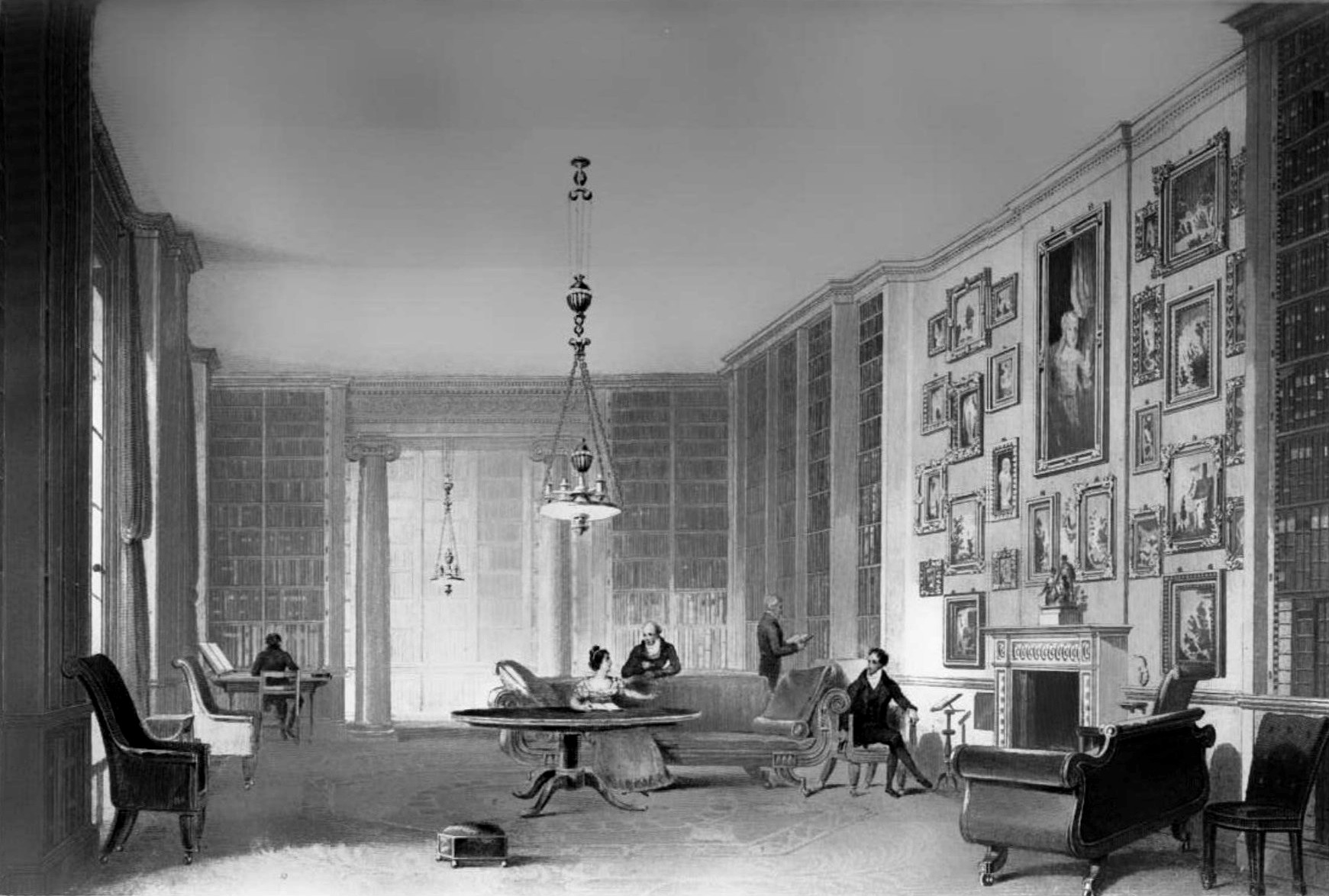
The Library in 1822

The ceiling of the original library at Althorp collapsed in 1773, and at the same time a new floor was put down in the Picture Gallery. Ionic columns and an Adam style ceiling were added. George John's fascination in literature began at a young age and there is a Reynolds portrait in the house of him at Trinity College, Cambridge holding a book By his later life, George John's collecting habit had become something of an obsession and he attempted to collect every volume ever published in Britain.

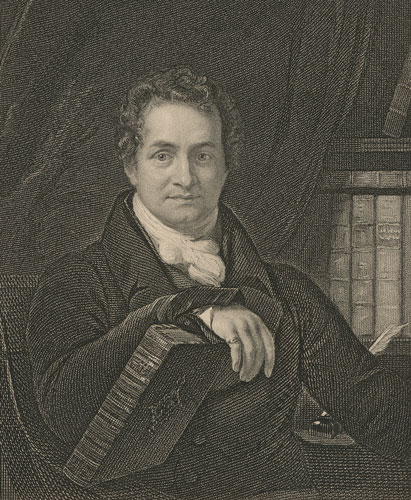
Thomas Frognall Dibdin, who became chief librarian of Althorp

The books were kept in five apartments in Althorp in the west wing, which, combined, formed the "Long Library" with books from the floor to the ceiling along much of its approximately 200 by 20 feet (61.0 m × 6.1 m) length. He not only collected British works but imported Greek and Latin classics, and in 1790, he acquired the collection of Count Charles de Revicksky, paying an initial £1000, and then £500 annually until the count's death, only three years later. George often paid great fees for rare books, including a woodcut of St Christopher dated to 1423, believed at that time to be the oldest work in ink with a date on it, the Papal Indulgence Letters of 1452, the Mazarin Bible of 1455, the Mentz Psalter of 1457, and some of the earliest works form the printing presses of Augsburg and Nuremberg such as Bonaventurae and Comestiorum Vitiorum. In 1812, George John was involved in an intense bidding war with his cousin, The Duke of Marlborough, for a copy of Boccaccio's The Decameron of 1471, one of only three known copies. Marlborough won the auction with a bid of £2,260 – an amount described by Charles Spencer as "ludicrous" for that time – but he later sold it to George for £750.

In 1802, George hired Reverend Thomas Frognall Dibdin as an official librarian to look after the collection and the library contains his many catalogues entitled Aedes Althorpianæ, documenting the books of the library. The collection became so enormous that the massive library became inadequate to hold the contents, and books began being stored along the long picture gallery on the first floor above it. By the time of George John's death in 1834, he had amassed one of the largest private collections in Europe of some 110,000 volumes. Alcoves were added to the ends of the library during the Holland restoration, creating extra room for the growing collection.

===== Billiard room =====
The billiard room is situated between the south drawing room and the library, and overlooks the deer park. Once known as the "Rubens room", the room was once described by Charles Spencer as a "dead space; desperately uncomfortable furniture, and Rubens's imposing portraits of several unattractive Habsburgs, against a tightly patterned silver silk, making it anything but welcoming". The room has now been "brought to life" with numerous horse and sporting paintings and portraits, including a dramatic portrait of Empress Elisabeth of Austria hunting, and a full-sized billiard table moved from the stables in the 1990s. The chimney piece of the room was made by Derval under Holland, and the room also contains an 1893 bronze sculpture of Forager, the Red Earl's favourite foxhound. The Broadbent ceiling is dated to 1865.

===== China museum and porcelain =====
The old "painter's passage", parallel to the south drawing room, was renovated after the Second World War when glass cases were installed along its length to showcase the Spencer crockery, with a range of porcelain including Meissen, Sèvres, Kangxi, Chelsea and Derby pieces. Charles Spencer remarked that his grandfather Albert was trying to say, "This part of Althorp will never be lived in again; so we may as well use it to show off the treasures in an orderly way". Today, most of the collection has been moved to the China Museum which lies on the east side of the house, between the Sutherland room and the great dining room, and the passage now contains a series of busts and paintings in its place, including a self-portrait of Sofonisba Anguisciola, and portraits of the dramatist Molière and the actor David Garrick. Charles Spencer highlights a pair of late 17th-century blue and white tulipieres, special vases to hold tulips which were fashionable at the time, as his favourite in the museum.

The Garden Lobby of Althorp also contains a number of pieces of porcelain from reputable European manufacturers, but also several rare Oriental pieces. Of note in the Garden Lobby aside from its many plates is a Sèvres tobacco jar with double strap handles, believed to be painted by Louis Jean Thévenet in 1765, two Chelsea vases decorated with putti which metaphorically represent the four seasons, which the Red Earl had bought as a gift for his wife Charlotte, an extremely finely carved Meissen flower bowl with hundreds of tiny gilded blooms which dates to around 1745, a Meissen card box, and a blue and gold cherubic Meissen chocolate set-for-one which was believed to have been made for Marie Antoinette in 1781 as a present celebrating the birth of her son Dauphin.

==== First floor ====
===== The picture gallery and chapel =====
The picture gallery stretches for 115 feet (35 m) on the first floor of the west wing, 21 feet (6.4 m) wide and 19 feet (5.8 m) high. (Note: According to the exact measurements of Althorp, the long gallery measures 114 feet 11 inches (35.03 m) by 21 feet (6.4 m). Spencer states 20 ft for the width but the official website states 20 ft 12 inches, which is 21 ft.) The room is one of the best remaining examples of the original Tudor woodwork and ambiance in the mansion, featuring oak panelling along its length. During the renovation of the 18th century, the oak panelling in the gallery was covered with white paint, and it was not until 1904 that it was restored to its former glory, the restoration funded by the sale of a Rubens painting in the housekeeper's room. Due to its length, during Tudor times the ladies of the mansion used the gallery for exercise on rainy days to avoid dragging their long skirts and dresses through the mud in the grounds. It was also used as a dining hall, and in 1695 the county nobility and gentry all met together and dined in the gallery to pay their respects to William III.

The gallery has an extensive collection of about 60 portraits, including Van Dyck's War and Peace, a John de Critz portrait of James I, a Frans Pourbus the Younger aristocratic portrait of Claude Lorrain, Duc de Chevreuse, a Mary Beale portrait of Charles II and others of him by court artist Sir Peter Lely, (Note: Lely was also responsible for painting ten of Charles' mistresses which are in the gallery, known as "The Windsor Beauties".) and portraits of George Digby, Second Earl of Bristol and William, First Duke of Bedford. Visiting the gallery in 1748, the Marchioness Grey described the gallery in a letter to a friend: "Indeed there is a gracefulness and life in the figures beyond what I ever saw, they are quite animated and a strength of colouring that strikes you from one end of that gallery to the other. It is so beautiful that a picture which hangs by it is hurt by its situation." Horace Walpole once wrote: "Althorp has several very fine pictures by the best Italian hands, and a gallery of all one's acquaintances by Vandyke and Lely. In the gallery I found myself quite at home; and surprised the housekeeper by my familiarity with the portraits." The portraits in the Picture Gallery are set in extravagant baroque gilded frames, designed by Robert Spencer, the Second Earl, which feature as "cartouche at the top and a stylised mask at the bottom, with a moulded inner edge, which softens the line between frame and painting". Albert Spencer was so protective of War and Peace, once the most valuable item in Althorp, that he had the nearest tall window in the gallery converted into a door with hinges, so in case of a fire it could safely be lifted outside. There is also a small hidden door between War and Peace and "The Windsor Beauties" cut into the oak which leads to a staircase and the Pink Suite, a guest bedroom. Lady Margaret Douglas-Home, sister of Albert Spencer, lived at Althorp from 1910, and the gallery was a favourite of hers. During the renovation of the 1980s, the old-fashioned celestial and terrestrial globes dating to the George II period were moved from the gallery back to the library.

The chapel on the upper floor became a store room in the early 1980s for pieces being sold off. The stained glass window of the chapel, with the Spencer crest, dates to 1588, and was brought to Althorp from Wormleigton. The organ on the other hand is far more recent, acquired from the parish of Meriden in the 1990s. A number of earlier occupants of Althorp, particularly George John and Frederick, were devout Christians and would preach in the chapel, and Robert, 6th Earl Spencer would hold a daily service here. It is still used for family christenings, and for services at Christmas, Easter and Harvest Thanksgiving.

Notable paintings on the upper floor

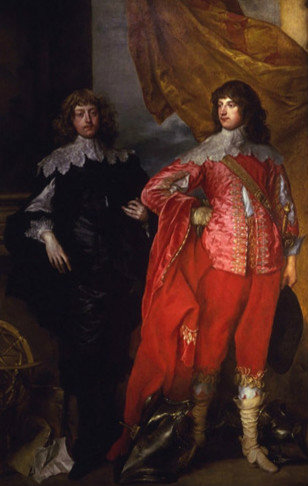
War and Peace by Sir Anthony van Dyck (1637)

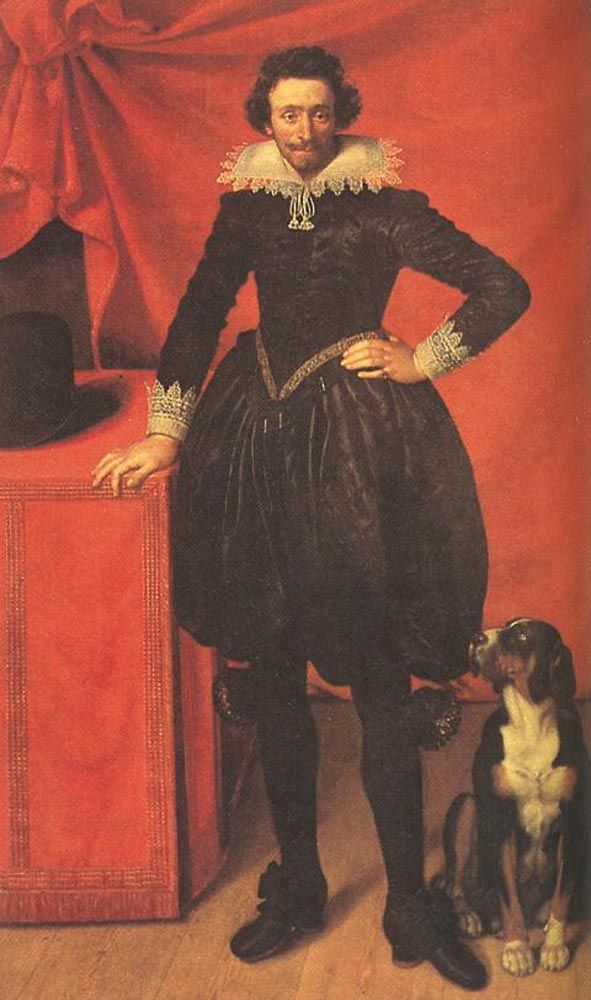
Portrait of Claude de Lorrain, Prince of Chevreuse by Frans Pourbus the Younger (1610)

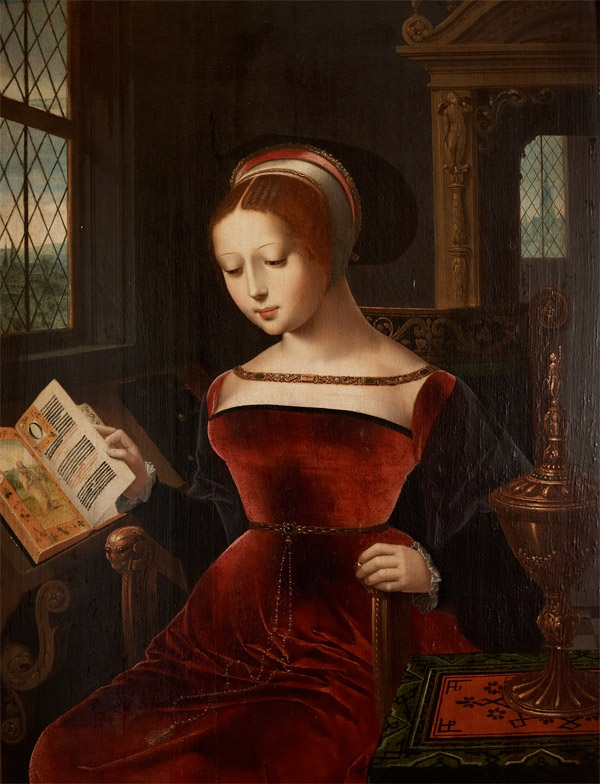
Portrait of Lady Jane Grey by Lucas de Heere before 1584)

===== Bedrooms =====
The oak bedroom is at the rear of the castle, on the western side between King William bedroom and the great room. The marriage of the first Earl Spencer and Margaret Georgiana took place in secret here on 20 December 1755, during a ball which was taking place at Althorp to celebrate John's 21st birthday. Georgiana later recalled, "We both behaved very well, spoke distinctly and loudly but I trembled so much I could hardly stand". As of 1998 it was furnished with deep red wall paper, rug and chairs, with oak floors, bed and chairs. There are several portraits on the wall, one of them very large above the fireplace. The Spencer "S" features on the blue velvet bed cover, and above the king-sized bed and by the fireplace.

The room to the east of the oak bedroom is known as the great room. The room was established in the mid-17th century as part of a reception suite, and was used by George John, the Second Earl for important political conferences during his period as First Lord of the Admiralty and Home Secretary. The great room, predominantly red and gold in design like many of the first floor rooms, contains a table and chairs with a large gilded mirror with three urns in front of it. The long mirror, designed by James Stuart, who was noted for his Athenian designs, features a tableaux at the top with the Spencer coat of arms and the pulling of chariots by cherubs, representing the love between John and Georgiana. The great room contains an extensive collection of miniature portraits, including a very rare Lucas de Heere portrait of Lady Jane Grey as a teenage girl at her family residence in Bradgate, Leicestershire. The Portrait of Isaak Abrahamsz. Massa is mentioned in the 1822 Bibliotheca Spenceriana as hanging in one of the bedrooms at Althorp. It was sold in 1924 to art merchant Joseph Duveen, who sold it the following year to Canadian businessman Frank P. Wood.

The Princess of Wales Bedroom is named after the wife of the future King Edward VII, Alexandra, Princess of Wales, who stayed at Althorp in 1863 on a visit to see the Red Earl. Although the fabric of the four-poster bed was designed in 1911, the room is largely Georgian, with deep red walls and furnishings, and contains a notable portrait of a young princess by the Spanish court painter, Bartolomé Esteban Murillo. The Queen Mary Bedroom is named after Mary, the wife of King George V, who visited Althorp in 1913. It contains a bed with an extremely tall structure, dated to the 18th century, draped in pea green taffet. Of particular note in the Queen Mary Bedroom are two chairs covered with needlework created by Albert, who was once the chairman of the Royal School of Needlework.

The upper floor also contains the India silk bedroom and the ante room, which measures 23 ft 4 inches by 32 ft 6 inches. Formerly known as the patchwork bedroom, the ante room was established by Charlotte, Countess Spencer and her sister during the Victorian period, and today forms part of a suite of state chambers.

=== Outer buildings ===
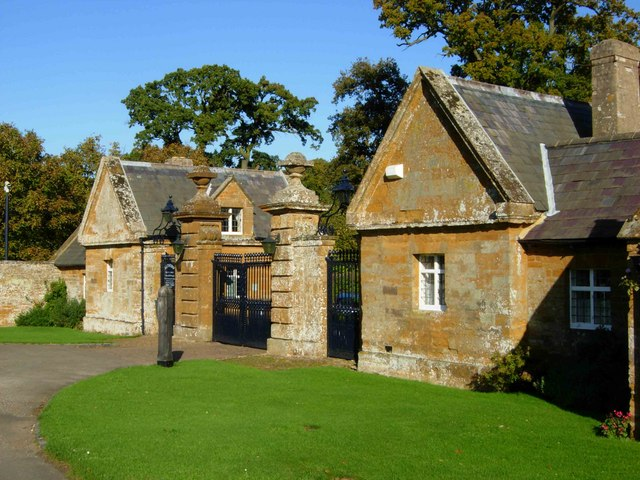
Althorp Park gateway

In total, Althorp estate contains 28 listed buildings and structures, of which nine are planting stones, dotted around the park. Two are Grade I listed, including the main house; two are Grade II* listed, including the stable block and Gardener's House, Althorp, and the remainder have a Grade II designation, mainly garden screens, gates and gateways aside from the planting stones.

The mustard-yellow Grade II* listed stable block, designed by architect Roger Morris with a Palladian influence, was ordered by Charles, Fifth Earl of Sutherland in the early 1730s. It replaced an earlier building which had long been in disrepair and could hold 30 to 40 horses. Morris designed the building with a clear Tuscan architectural design, drawing upon earlier inspiration from his stables at Inigo Jones's St Paul's Church in Covent Garden. A fountain was installed in the courtyard to provide the horse's troughs with water, although this no longer survives. Several rooms were built within the stable block, including hot and cold baths for riders after hunting, a veterinarian's room with medicines for horses, and what was once a smoking room. Sarah, Duchess of Marlborough remarked at how large the structure was when it was constructed, noting that it was rather an extravagance. It was converted into an exhibition centre to celebrate the life of Princess Diana between 1998 and 2013, and the space now houses a yearly exhibition picking on a theme of the estate. 2019's was entitled 'Animals of Althorp' and explored the estate's relationship with animals throughout the centuries. .

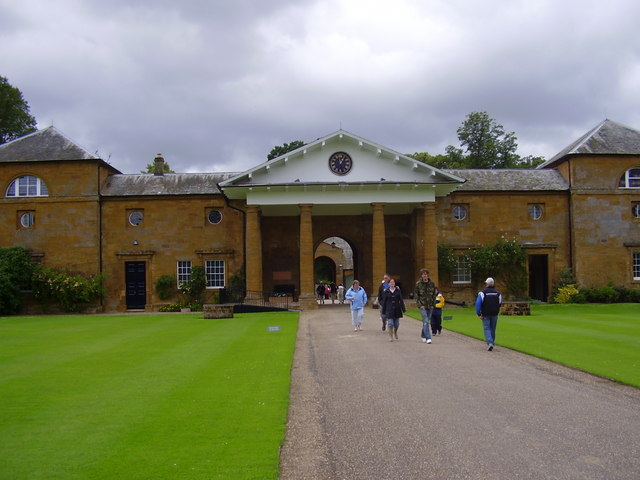
The stable block

The Grade I listed Falconry was built in 1613 using the same local ironstone as the stables and is of similar Palladian appearance, featuring a "gabled roof with ashlar parapets, kneelers and obelisks". It is a two-storey structure, but a single storey red-brick extension was added in the 19th century. The hall of the falconry contains 2 arcaded openings with keystones, and to the left of the hall is a fireplace with Delft tiles, dated to the 19th century. Over the centuries at various times it has been the home of the park warden, the gamekeeper, and the kennelman who looked after the hounds, hosting puppy shows in the 20th century. Both the stable block and Falconry became listed buildings in November 1954. Nearby was the Lavender Cottage with a thatched roof and a wendy house which the Althorp children would play in, but was accidentally burned down by the son of the chauffeur of Albert, and never rebuilt.

The Fifth Earl also built the Grade II* listed Gardener's House at the back of the park, in a similar Palladian style. The head gardener of Althorp resided at the villa in the 18th century. Princess Diana had been intent on living in the castle following her separation from Prince Charles, but due to security concerns it was considered unfeasible. Of particular note is its Victorian three-quarter life-sized marble sculpture, The Shipwrecked Mariner, depicting a sailor reaching desperately from a raft. Charles Spencer has since moved it from the main portico of Gardener's House to the main house where it sits in the Painters Passage.

Both of the North and South West Lodges of Althorp date to around 1730 under Roger Morris and are both built from lias ashlar with slate roofs. The North and South East Lodges date to around 1810 and are built from limestone ashlar with slate roofs. All four buildings became Grade II listed buildings in November 1954. The Grade II listed Dairy Cottage, to the northwest of the lake, dates to the late 18th century under Henry Holland, and was listed in December 1986. It is a two-storey building with an attic and hipped roof. It has a 19th-century central door and a surrounding porch "flanked by casements under flat arch heads".

== Grounds ==
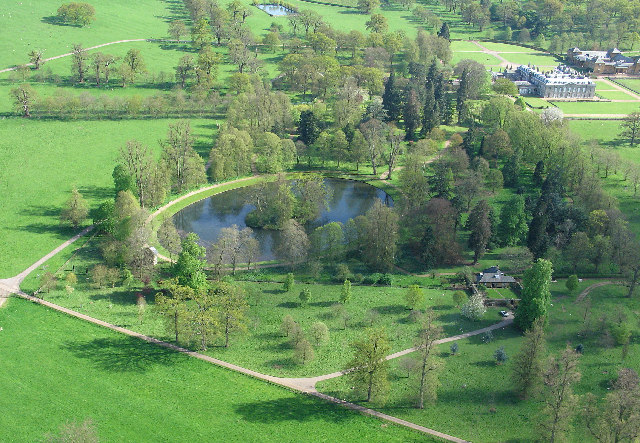
Aerial view of Althorp and Diana, Princess of Wales's Island on Round Oval lake

The estate of Althorp covers an area of at least 13,000 acres (50 km^{2}), and not only includes the house grounds but areas of woodland, cottages, farms, and surrounding hamlets. The soil in the area is of a rich, dark-coloured loam, and the estate is situated mainly on Jurassic Clay between 85 metres (279 ft) and 125 metres (410 ft) above sea level, with the highest area lying in the southeast of Althorp on Northampton Sand. Within the grounds, there are earthworks of the lost village of Althorp on which the estate was built. To the southwest of the house is High Wood, with the Dog Pond to the east of this. Bircham Spinney is immediately to east, to the south of the pond. Hopyard Spinney lies in the north-east corner of the estate bordering the A428, and Sir John's Wood marks the northwest corner. Sir John's Wood is named after John Spencer who was responsible for the planting of a number of woods on the grounds in the latter half of the 16th century. One tablet mentions he planted one of the woods in 1567–1568 and Sir John's Wood in 1589, at a time when lords of manors around Britain grew increasingly anxious of their security following the Spanish Armada and planted woodlands around their properties. Between 1567 and 1901 at least seven stone date tablets were erected in the park commemorating the planting of trees. In the north and north-eastern part of Althorp is marshy ground which is natural feeding ground for herons, a prized delicacy historically at the house. They were harvested by the gamekeeper usually from early March, after being fattened up by meal and bullock's liver. In 1842 one hundred nests were recorded at the estate but this had fallen to ten by 1889. The herons were moved to a pond about two miles away in 1993 and are no longer produced for domestic consumption at Althorp. Northampton Golf Club, established in July 1893, is situated immediately to the southeast of Althorp.

Robert Spencer hired the French landscape architect André Le Nôtre to lay out the park and grounds in the 1660s. A map by Jan Kip which appeared in Britannia Illustrata (1709) showed the result of the changes, depicting the house with a wide rectangular courtyard on the main south front, a formal walled garden structured by rectangular-shaped flower-beds and lawns to the east, and tree-lined avenues to the north and south. During the renovation under Holland in the 18th century, the lake was drained in the deer park, which the First Earl had used as a playground with full-sized Venetian gondolas, and remaining traces of the old moat were eradicated. From 1860 onwards the architect William Milford Teulon (1823–1900) updated the gardens at Althorp, and further additions and changes were made in the 1990s under Dan Pearson when the Diana memorial was established and many trees planted. After Teulon's additions, the Spencers began growing its own fruit and vegetables and flowers. In 1901 a variety of sweet pea, now known "Spencer type", with "flowers of exceptional size and of an exquisite shade of pink", was cultivated at Althorp by Silas Cole, the chief gardener to the Fifth Earl Spencer, and exhibited at horticultural shows.

=== Diana grave, memorial, and exhibition ===
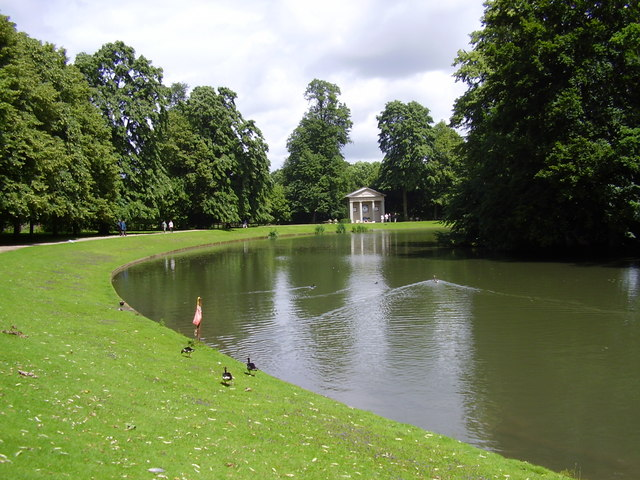
Round Oval lake with the Diana memorial beyond

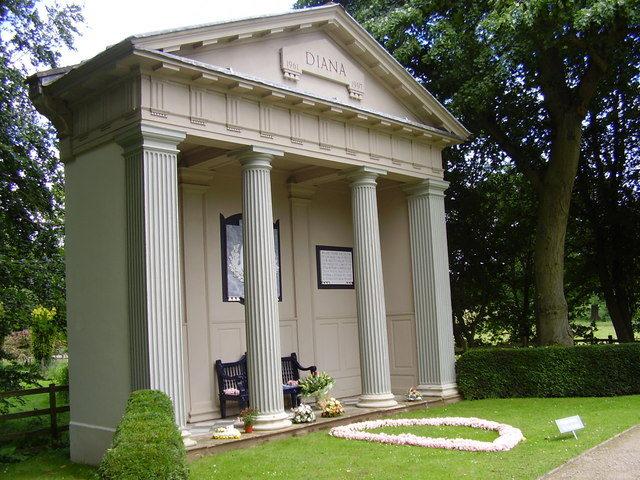
Diana, Princess of Wales, Memorial

Diana, Princess of Wales, was interred on a small island in the middle of the ornamental Round Oval lake, which was created by Teulon in 1868. The island was decided as the best place to lay her to rest because the water would, according to Spencer, "act as a buffer against the interventions of the insane and ghoulish, the thick mud presenting a further line of defence. We all agreed that, with its beauty and tranquillity, this was the place for Diana to be". The ground was consecrated by the Bishop of Peterborough prior to the burial. Her burial place is marked with a white memorial plinth and urn.

A Doric-style temple with Diana's name inscribed on top is situated across from the lake, as a place where visitors can lay down their floral tributes to the princess. It contains a black silhouette of her in the middle, set in white marble, evocative of the Henry Holland's material preference, with a tablet on either side. One tablet displays a quote from Diana about her love of charitable work, and the other holds Charles Spencer's concluding tribute given at her funeral in Westminster Abbey. The temple was originally commissioned by George Spencer, 2nd Earl Spencer, to thank God for the British victory in the Battle of the Nile.

Following the death of Diana on 31 August 1997 and the subsequent decision to create a memorial and open the house and estate to the public, the garden designer Dan Pearson was commissioned to update the park and gardens, to accommodate for visitors. A series of 36 oak trees was planted along the access road, symbolic of the years of Diana's life. Thousands of plants were planted, including 100 white rambling roses on the island and 1000 white water lilies, donated by Stowe School, in the water around it.

The estate stable block was converted into a public exhibition devoted to the memory of Diana, and open between 1998 and 2013, It was designed by Rasshied Ali Din, who had to seek approval from English Heritage due to it being a Grade II listed building. Din said of the result, "You have a contrast of the modern and the new with the old and the established, which is basically a metaphor for Diana. She was a very modern woman within an established environment." He created six rooms out of the former carriage houses and stabling areas, and the old tea room was transformed into a restaurant, and toilets installed for visitors.

The first room was called "Spencer Women", placing Diana in context to the women of her family, with paintings and jewellery of Sarah, Duchess of Marlborough, and portraits of Georgiana Spencer etc. The next room contained four minutes of edited video footage of Diana as a child to show to the world that she did not simply come into being in 1980 when she became the girlfriend of Prince Charles. It featured footage of Diana at her christening, her first winter, her first birthday, her first steps, and footage displaying her affection for animals, swimming, and leaving for boarding school. The room also contained her tuck-box, toy typewriter, ballet shoes, and a childhood photo album.

A third room documented the Royal Wedding and its "glamour and excitement", with a display of the David Emanuel wedding dress she wore on 29 July 1981. A fourth room documented her extensive charitable and humanitarian work through video footage edited by Tim Ashton, and a fifth, known as the "Tribute Room".

The sixth room was the Exhibition, which was a celebration of her life, and contained large glass cases at the sides with dummies of Diana wearing her notable suits and dresses, with the occasions documented on cards on the floor in front of them. A great glass case at the end underneath a stylish black and white photograph contained a selected few hundred of the thousands of condolence books the Spencers received from around the world, designed to give a "final sense of scale to the impact of Diana's life and of her death". A sleek, silk-bound copy of the address that her brother Charles delivered at Diana's funeral was available for £25.

The estate and house are open to the public during the summer months (1 July to 30 August), although the exhibition centre in the stable block was closed in August 2013. It was believed to be due to concern about the commercial exploitation of Diana's name, and the desire to "squash the cult of Diana". The items on display have been packed up, with the intention to give them to her sons William and Harry. All profits made were donated to the Diana, Princess of Wales Memorial Fund, which closed in 2012.

== Haunting ==
Although the current owner, Charles Spencer, professes to have never witnessed a ghost at Althorp or anywhere else, over the years numerous ghostly sightings have been reported in the mansion. In the mid-19th century the Dean of Lincoln was invited to stay at the property by Frederick, 4th Earl Spencer. He complained the following morning that during the night a figure dressed as a groom (believed to be the ghost of the deceased servant of the 3rd Earl) had entered his room holding candles and checking that they were snuffed out around the bed. Lady Margaret Douglas-Home professed to being aware of a ghost of a girl with grey slippers in the gallery.

== See also ==
- List of historic houses in England
