= William Spencer (sheriff) =

English nobleman, politician, knight, landowner, and High Sheriff (1496-1532)

Sir William Spencer
- Born: c. 1496; Althorp, Northamptonshire
- Died: 22 June 1532; Althorp, Northamptonshire
- Buried: Brington Church
- Noble family: Spencer
- Spouse: Susan Knightley
- Issue: John Spencer; Isobel Spencer; Jane Spencer
- Father: John Spencer
- Mother: Isabella Graunt

Sir William Spencer (c. 1496 – 22 June 1532) was an English nobleman, politician, knight, landowner, and High Sheriff from the Spencer family.

== Life and family ==
Spencer was the son of John Spencer of Hodnell and Wormleighton, Warwickshire, and Althorp, Northamptonshire, and his wife, Isabella Graunt.

In the parish church for Althorp, St Mary the Virgin in Great Brington, Sir William bequeathed the church's east window of stained glass which depicted St. John the Baptist and the Spencer coat of arms, now in a south window of the chancel, in memory of his father, and a plain altar tomb with an Elizabethan tablet commemorating his life and death and that of his lady Susan, the daughter of Sir Richard Knightley.

Spencer was appointed Sheriff of Northamptonshire for 1531–32, but died in office and was replaced by Sir David Cecil. He was buried in Brington church, the parish church for Althorp.

== Marriage and issue ==
Spencer married Susan Knightley, the daughter of Sir Richard Knightley, of Fawsley, Northamptonshire and had a son, John Spencer, and five daughters. His daughter Isobel married Sir John Cotton, MP for Cambridgeshire. His daughter Jane married Sir Richard Brydges, MP for Berkshire.
