= Vorstermans =

Vorstermans is a surname. Notable people with the surname include:

- Ismo Vorstermans (born 1989), Dutch footballer
- Johannes Vorstermans (c. 1643-c. 1719), Dutch painter
