= John Spencer (1455–1522) =

English nobleman (1455–1522)

Sir John Spencer
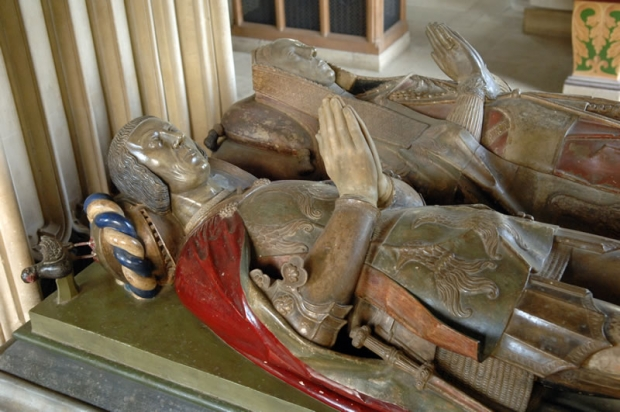
- Sir John Spencer and Isabella Graunt's tomb at Great Brington
- Predecessor: William Spencer of Rodburn
- Successor: William Spencer
- Born: c. 1455; Althorp, Northamptonshire, Kingdom of England
- Died: 14 April 1522 (aged 66–67); Althorp, Northamptonshire, Kingdom of England
- Buried: Brington Church
- Noble family: Spencer
- Spouse: Isabella Graunt
- Issue: William Spencer
- Father: William Spencer of Rodburn
- Mother: Elizabeth Empson

Sir John Spencer (c. 1455 – 14 April 1522) was an English nobleman, politician, sheriff, knight, merchant and landowner.

== Life and family ==
Spencer was the son of William Spencer of Rodburn (1430–1485) and his wife Elizabeth Empson, daughter of Sir Peter Empson. In 1469, John Spencer's uncle — another John Spencer — had become feoffee (feudal lord) of Wormleighton in Warwickshire and a tenant at Althorp in Northamptonshire in 1486. The Spencers’ administration of their Northamptonshire and Warwickshire estates was admired and often emulated by gentlemen all over England. Sheep from their pastures were purchased for breeding and it is probable that the family's success as farmers was rarely equalled in the century. The Spencers were granted a coat of arms in 1504, "Azure a fess Ermine between 6 sea-mews' heads erased Argent", which bears no resemblance to that used by the family after around 1595.

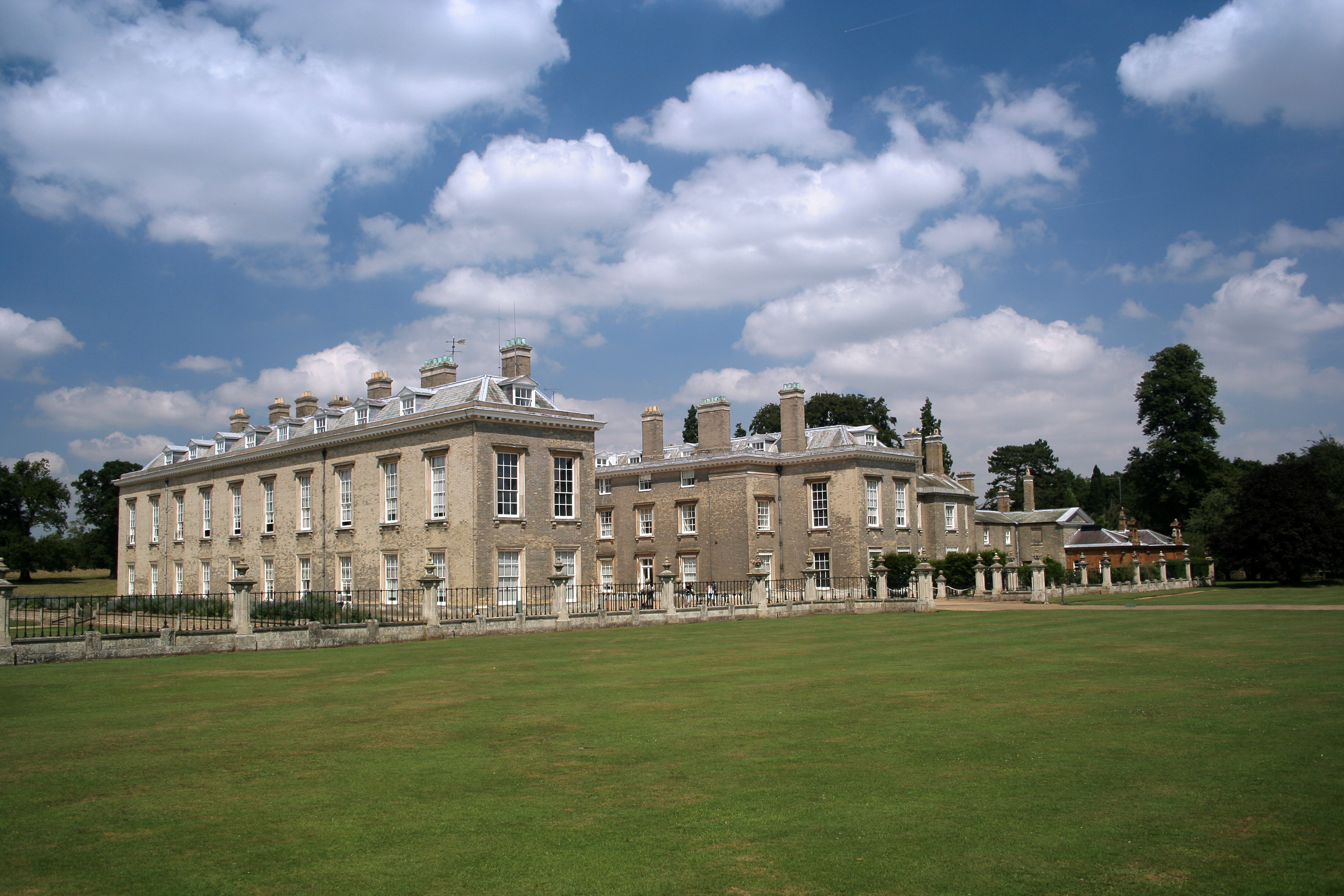
Althorp, the family seat of the Spencer family for 500 years

Spencer first made a living by trading in livestock and other commodities and eventually saved enough money to purchase the manors of Wormleighton and Althorp. Wormleighton was bought from Sir William Cope in 1506, and a new manor house was completed in 1512. In 1508, John Spencer also purchased the estate of Althorp with its moated house and several hundred acres of farmland. He had grazed sheep here from the 1480s. Impressed by the quality of the land, he eventually bought it and rebuilt the house in 1508. At that time, his estate and mansion in Warwickshire were considerably larger, the house in Wormleighton was four times the size of Althorp. In 1511 he made further purchases to acquire much of the surrounding countryside, including the villages of Little Brington and Great Brington as well their parish church of St Mary the Virgin, from Thomas Grey, 2nd Marquess of Dorset. By putting down roots at Althorp, Spencer provided what was to become the home for the next 19 generations.

Between 1513 and 1515, Spencer devoted much funds and planning to the parish church for Althorp, St Mary the Virgin in Great Brington. In 1513, he appointed Thomas Heritage to be rector of the church, who had previously been chaplain to King Henry VII and surveyor of the monarch's works at Westminster Abbey. It is altogether probable that Heritage designed and superintended the execution of Spencer's idea for a family chapel at the parish church. His will, dated the 12th day of April 1522, just two days before Sir John's death, states that he virtually rebuilt the whole church. His bequests included "oon hool syte of vestments and a chales", "the making of the chauncell roffe with the ledde, wall and wyndowes, and my armes to be sett in the same wyndowes" as well as his tomb, shared with his lady Isabella Graunt. For this tomb, to be placed in the easternmost bay of the family chapel, nearest to the altar, he left the sum of 20 pounds.

In 1519, Spencer was knighted by King Henry VIII. He died three years later and was buried in the new family chapel at Great Brington. His younger son and successor Sir William Spencer later bequeathed the church's east window of stained glass which depicted St. John the Baptist and the Spencer coat of arms, now in a south window of the chancel, in memory of his father.

== Personal life ==
Spencer married Isabella Graunt, daughter of Sir Walter Graunt of Snitterfield, and had children.

Their daughter Dorothy Spencer married Sir Richard Catesby MP (grandson of Sir Richard Empson, Speaker of the House of Commons), and had four sons and two daughters. Their great-grandson Robert Catesby was leader of the Gunpowder Plot.

Upon his death in 1522, the Spencer estates at Wormleighton and Althorp passed to his younger son Sir William Spencer, who died ten years later.
