= Jan Soukens =

Dutch painter

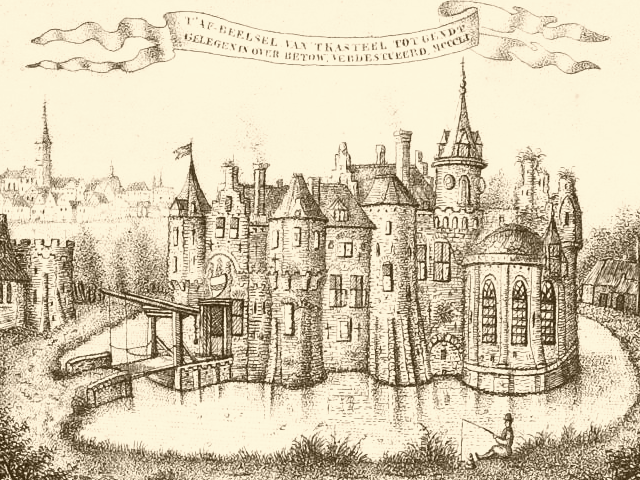
Ghent Castle

Jan Soukens (c.1650–c.1725) was a Dutch Golden Age painter.

== Biography ==
Soukens was born and died in Zaltbommel. According to Houbraken he was a pupil of Johannes Vorstermans whom he met in a market ship travelling from Dordrecht to Nijmegen in 1694. Soukens was on his way home to Zaltbommel after selling paintings at the market in Dordt, which he did twice a year. The two men enjoyed each other's company, and Soukens offered Houbraken his house to stay in, which surprised Houbraken until he realized that the houses around Zaltbommel were all pretty broken down. Soukens claimed he had two houses, one with a roof for the winter time, and one without a roof for the summer time. He had a few paintings with him that he hadn't sold, which is how Houbraken struck up the conversation. Houbraken commented that he was a pleasant man who didn't seem bothered that the demand for his art had fallen so much in recent years.

According to the RKD he was a follower of Herman Saftleven who had two sons he taught to paint; Hendrik (who travelled to Rome) and Gijsbert. He also influenced the painter known as the Monogrammist ISvM.
