= Great Brington =

Village in Northamptonshire, England

Coordinates: 52.2791°N 1.0265°W

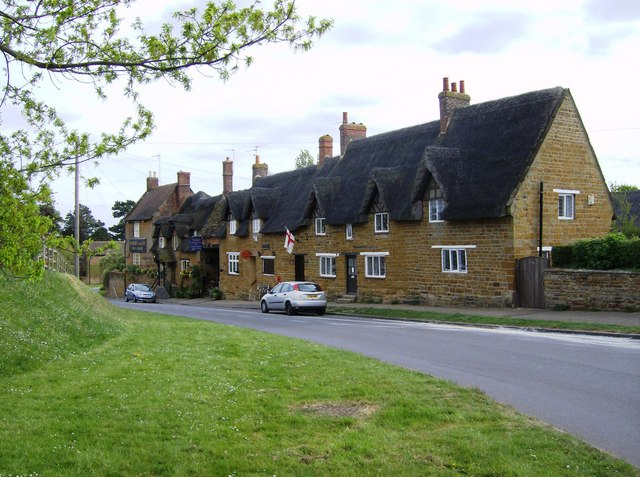

- Location within Northamptonshire
- OS grid reference: SP665650
- Civil parish: Brington
- Unitary authority: West Northamptonshire
- Ceremonial county: Northamptonshire
- Region: East Midlands
- Country: England
- Sovereign state: United Kingdom
- Post town: Northampton
- Postcode district: NN7
- Dialling code: 01604
- Police: Northamptonshire
- Fire: Northamptonshire
- Ambulance: East Midlands
- UK Parliament: Daventry

Great Brington is a village in Northamptonshire, England, in the civil parish of Brington, which at the 2021, Census had a population of 539. The parish church is St Mary the Virgin.

The village's name means 'Farm/settlement connected with Bryni'.

In 1508, John Spencer from Wormleighton in Warwickshire purchased the estate of Althorp outside Great Brington with its moated house and several hundred acres of farmland. He had grazed sheep here from the 1480s. In 1508, impressed by the quality of the land, he eventually bought it and rebuilt the house. In 1511 he made further purchases to acquire much of the surrounding countryside, including the villages of Little Brington and Great Brington as well as their parish church, from Thomas Grey, 2nd Marquess of Dorset.

Just outside the village is Althorp House, the home of the Spencer family where Diana, Princess of Wales grew up. Nineteen generations of the Spencer family are interred at Great Brington church including Diana's father the 8th Earl Spencer, who died in 1992. The death of Diana had an effect on the village – the pub was renamed from The Fox and Hounds to the Althorp Coaching Inn and the post office gained currency exchange facilities following the large increase in tourism to the area.

The Macmillan Way long distance footpath passes through Great Brington.

== Geography ==
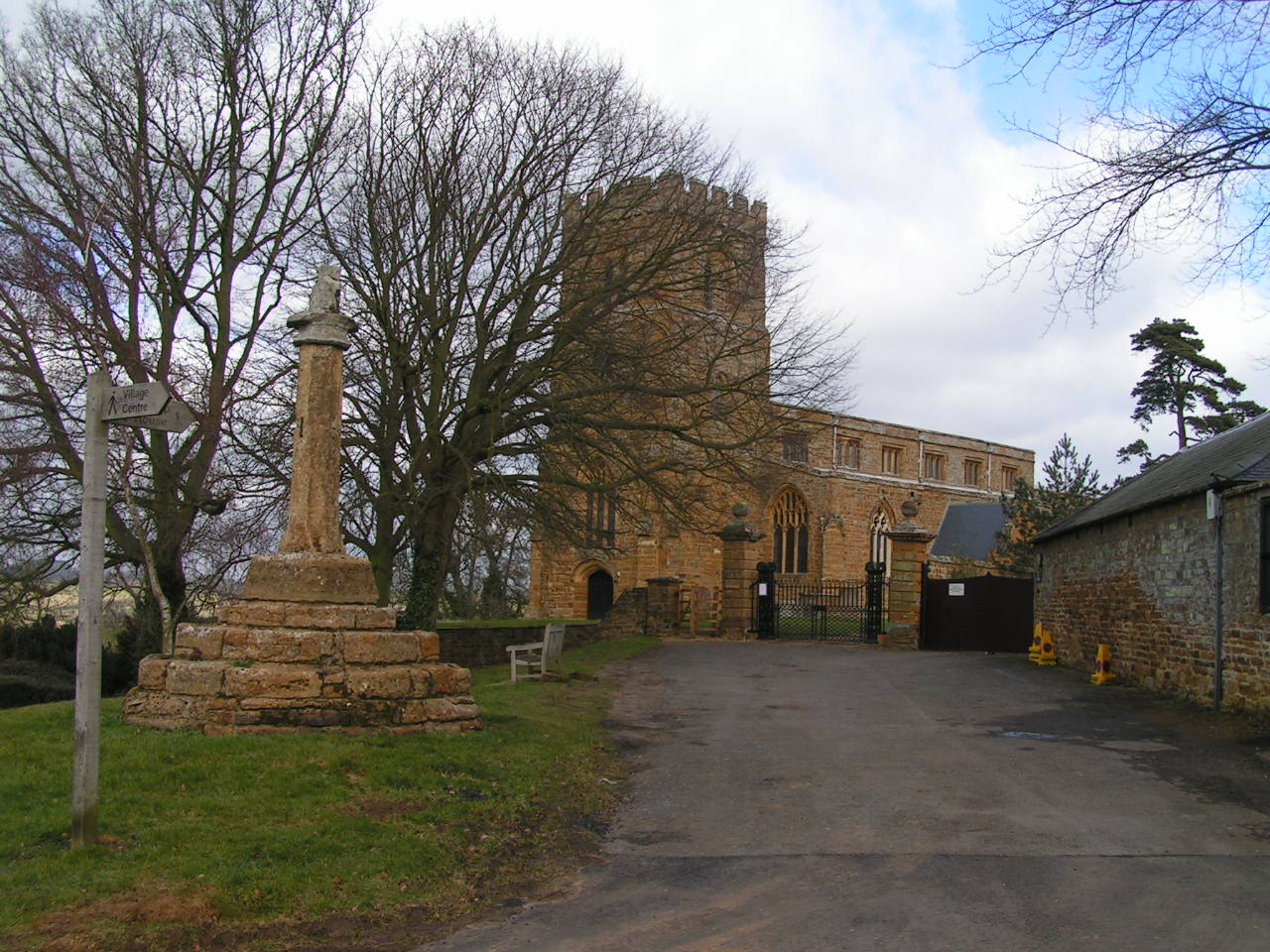
Great Brington Cross and Church

Nearby settlements include Little Brington, Nobottle and Long Buckby.

== Notable people from Great Brington ==
- Lawrence Washington (1565–1616), the great-great-great-grandfather of George Washington, first president of the United States, is buried in the chancel of the Church at St Mary's in the village.
- Betsy Baker (1842–1955), a supercentenarian who was born in Great Brington and recognized as the world's oldest living person until she died aged 113, on 24 October 1955.
- Jo Whiley, disc jockey and television presenter, is from the village.
- Bill Bellamy Military Cross Winner and non-fiction best selling writer of "Troop Leader", lived here for many years.
