= Bill Bellamy (British Army officer) =

British Army officer (1923–2009)

Bill Bellamy MC
- Born: 1 December 1923; Northampton, Northamptonshire, England
- Died: 18 March 2009 (aged 85); Barnstaple, Devon, England
- Spouse(s): Ann Burbury (m. 1950; died 2001) Felicity Sidders (m. 2007)
- Children: 5
- Military career
- Allegiance: United Kingdom
- Branch: British Army
- Service years: 1941–1955
- Rank: Captain
- Nickname: "Bill"
- Service number: 267985
- Unit: 8th King's Royal Irish Hussars
- Conflicts: Second World War
- Awards: Military Cross

Captain Bill Bellamy, MC KHS (1 December 1923 – 18 March 2009) was an officer in the 8th King's Royal Irish Hussars between 1943 and 1955. He served briefly with his regiment in the North African Campaign and extensively in Northern Europe as part of the D Day landings. His book, Troop Leader: A Tank Commander's Story is an example of the experiences of front-line tank warfare in the Second World War based on his diary of the events that happened.

He was one of the first British soldiers to be able to wander unhindered in the ruins of Berlin's government area in the immediate post cease fire period of 1945. On 5 March 1945, Field Marshal Sir Bernard Montgomery presented him with the Military Cross for his bravery during the battle for the hamlet of Doornhoek, near Berlicum in the Netherlands during October 1944. Under heavy German machine-gun, mortar and shell fire, and in a minefield, he retrieved his burning tank and crew before overrunning the enemy's position to allow infantrymen to advance.

== Early life ==
Lionel Gale "Bill" Bellamy was born on 1 December 1923 in Northampton, the only son of Captain Ronald Vincent Bellamy and Olive Helen Gale of Shaldon, Devonshire. His father, Ronald, was a salesman who served in France during the First World War and later became a prisoner of war (POW) in the North African campaign during the Second World War. His mother, Olive, was a dress designer. He attended Hawthorn Community Primary School in Kettering, then Blackfriars (Dominican) boarding school in nearby Laxton at the age of 11. During his time there he converted to Catholicism. He always believed his faith had given him strength to endure combat.

== Military career ==
Bellamy received his call-up when he turned 18, which disrupted his plans to go to a university. He signed up in December 1941, to the Royal Armoured Corps (RAC) after being assured by the recruiting sergeant that he could serve with his father in the 1st Armoured Division and was sent to training at the 58th Training Regiment (RAC) at Bovington Camp in Dorset.

It was at this time Bellamy received nickname 'Bill'. The other men in his billet introduced themselves and he became embarrassed, believing he could receive mocking if it was known his name was Lionel. He, instead, stated it was Bill and this stuck for the rest of his life.

=== Commissioning ===
During training and after returning from a period of sick leave for diesel poisoning, he was promoted to lance corporal and selected as a potential officer. After passing the commissions board he was sent to the Royal Military College, Sandhurst as an officer cadet in August 1942. He was commissioned as a second lieutenant on 20 March 1943. In the company of a friend he applied successfully to Brigadier John Van der Byl DSO for selection as a cornet in the 8th King's Royal Irish Hussars. He eventually made his way to Kasra-nil Barracks, Cairo where he joined the regiment under the command of Colonel Cuthie Goulburn. The hussars then sailed to England to begin training for D-Day and were embarked for France with the 7th Armoured Division.

=== D-Day to Berlin ===
A Cromwell Tank

Initially, Bellamy was placed in charge of an echelon, meaning he had to escort his group of supply vehicles to various supply depots to replenish stock used by the regiment. During the Battle of Villers-Bocage, his jeep ran into retreating German infantry and was hit by sub-machine gun fire. Bellamy was wounded in the head but after receiving seven stitches stayed at his post. After Villers-Bocage, a squadron required re-organisation, and Bellamy was assigned as troop leader of 3rd Troop. He took over as commander of his own Cromwell Tank, one of three in the troop.

On his first day in command of 3rd Troop, he chanced upon two British armoured cars from the 61st Reconnaissance Regiment. As they approached him, they were hit by fire from a well concealed enemy gun. Dismounting his own vehicle, Bellamy approached the two destroyed armoured cars and rescued several members of the crews whom he found alive in the wrecked and gore-streaked interiors.

This was the first of many experiences as a tank commander in the vanguard of the battle. Bellamy continued to face the retreating German army through France. Bellamy's troop advanced through France, Belgium, the Netherlands and into the German heartland, following the line of advance of the Eighth Army, which the tank and cavalry regiments were spearheading.

=== Military cross ===
On 22 October 1944, Bellamy's troop was part of a screen for infantry advancing near Doornhoek in the south of the Netherlands when it came under small arms, mortar and artillery fire. He engaged the enemy posts, eventually taking out three, and assisted the infantry in getting forward. Machine gun bullets struck his tank and caused molten lead to splatter in his face, and his tank entered a minefield and nearly ran over a mine. A jerry can of petrol spilt and set his bedding on fire, but he managed to get his burning tank and crew to safety. His beret was later found to have two bullet holes in it. For his gallantry, he was awarded the Military Cross, which was personally presented to him by Field Marshal Sir Bernard Montgomery in a ceremony on 5 March 1945.

=== Into Germany ===
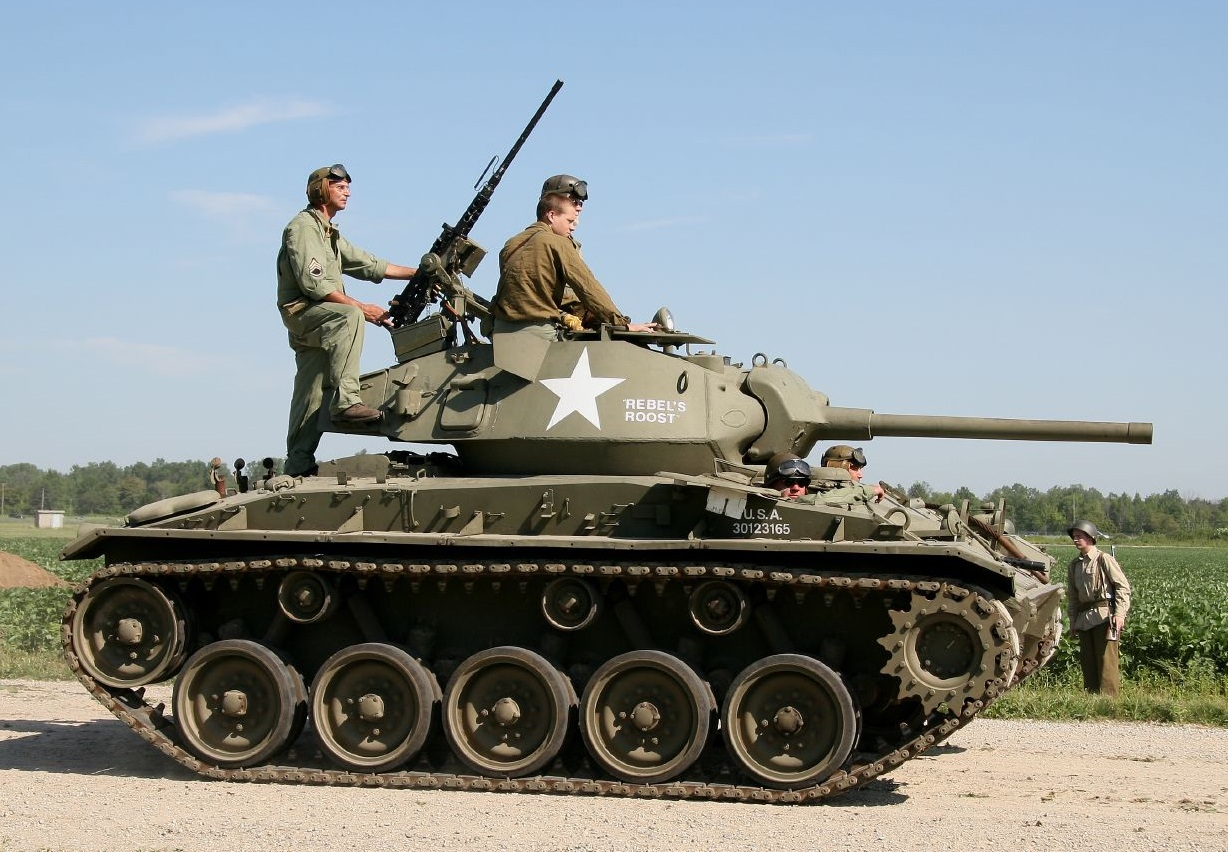
Chaffee tank

Bellamy was given a leave to return to England upon the untimely death of his mother who was killed by a V-2 rocket in London. Whilst there he was hospitalised for a bout of recurring jaundice which had dogged him since his time in Egypt. His own opinion was that this was timely as he had been advised by fellow officers that he had become "bomb happy" and was intentionally placing himself in the most dangerous of situations without concern for his safety or that of his tank crew.

On his return to the regiment, by now close to Harburg following the relief of Fallingbostel POW Camp he was advised he was to take over as second in command of the Reconnaissance Troop under the command of Tim Pierson. He was allocated a Chaffee tank which formed part of the main equipment of the Reconnaissance Troop and immediately began operations in this new role.

Following operations in observation of the Elbe and the relief of a POW camp containing around 100 Belgians the regiment entered Hamburg after the surrender of that city. The condition of the city and its people made him feel very uncomfortable and his feelings towards the German populace mellowed from that of hate to that of pity. After VE Day he was able to work alongside the Catholic relief agency CCRA based at Greven near Münster, helping displaced persons.

=== Berlin ===
On 4 July 1945 the regiment loaded its tanks onto transporters and set off for Berlin to take part in the victory parade. The regiment was based at the Olympic Stadium in the newly designated British Sector. At the first opportunity and before orders were issued prohibiting such activities he and some fellow officers were able to borrow a jeep and explore the administrative heart of the capital. They visited the burnt out shell of the Reichstag first and then went on to the Reich Chancellery which was looted and severely damaged in the fighting but largely intact. In Adolf Hitler's study only his desk remained. They tried to gain access to the gardens at the rear but the Russians had placed a guard on it and forbade them exploring it. They were however, able to grab some souvenirs from the detritus in the building in the form of several small etchings and cards which contained Christmas greetings from the Führer.

Having interfaced with the Russians and watched a number of incidents at close quarters including the deaths of two civilians Bellamy formed the opinion that "it seemed abundantly clear to us that the Russians had been given carte blanche to carry out any excess in Berlin as a means of punishing and totally subduing the population."

On Saturday 21 July 1945 the regiment took its place behind the vehicles of the Royal Horse Artillery as second most senior army regiment on parade. The parade commenced 20 minutes late at 10:50. Promoted to captain in August 1945 Bellamy went on extended leave from what he describes as quite a leisurely life in Berlin which ended before his return as the regiment was moved to Itzehoe in Schleswig-Holstein.

=== Post war ===
Bill Bellamy was appointed adjutant of the 8th Hussars and in 1950 was organising the regiment for overseas deployment to Korea when he again became ill with another bout of recurring jaundice. Officially deemed "Fit for home service only" he was transferred to the Northamptonshire Yeomanry as adjutant, finally retiring from the army in 1955.

== Civilian life and family ==
In 1955 Bellamy joined the board of the shoe components firm Phipps and Son and, after a merger, a board member of Chamberlain Phipps. He rose to become managing director, retiring in 1983. He then became a parish councillor at Great Brington, Northamptonshire, and took a close interest, as a Knight of the Holy Sepulchre, in the Christian Arabs of Palestine. He was for a number of years chairman of the Rugby-based Mayday Trust, which provides housing and support for vulnerable adults. He was also an active supporter of the Cynthia Spencer Hospice in Northampton, named after the current Earl of Spencer's grandmother, and raised £30,000 for the hospice by trekking across Cuba in 2005, at the age of 81.

Bellamy married Ann Burbury in 1950. They had four sons and one daughter: Simon, James, Andrew, Giles and Sarah. Ann died in 2001 and Bill got remarried to Felicity Sidders in 2007. His son Andrew followed in his footsteps and was commissioned in the Queen's Royal Irish Hussars, rose to the rank of brigadier, and became colonel of the regiment in November 2009 in the wake of Major General Arthur Denaro CBE DL. Bill Bellamy was also the "adopted" grandfather to two Palestinian students after financing a trip to England as part of their studies. His wartime diary and photographs remained in his attic for forty years until he rediscovered them and decided to write up his wartime experiences for his children. A publisher persuaded him to publish them, as Troop Leader, A Tank Commander's Story in 2005. He died of cancer at Barnstaple, Devon on 18 March 2009.

== Bibliography ==
- Bellamy, Bill (2005). Troop Leader, A Tank Commander's Story. Stroud: Sutton Publishing. ISBN 978-0-7509-4534-9. OCLC 226088643.
- Napier, Richard (2002). From Horses to Chieftains: My Life with the 8th Hussars. Woodfield Publishing. ISBN 1-873203-17-9. OCLC 656144994.
