= Johannes Vorstermans =

Johannes Vorstermans (John Vosterman; ca.1643, Zaltbommel – ca.1699/1719, Zaltbommel), was a Dutch Golden Age landscape painter. Considered superior to all of his contemporaries, he created works for Charles II. The Scottish artist, T. Graham referred to him as F. de Vosterman.

== Early years ==
Born at Zaltbommel circa 1643, he learned the rudiments of the art from his father, who was a portrait painter. According to Houbraken he was the son of Otto Vorsterman (a probable relation of Lucas Vorsterman, since Houbraken claims he was from a good portrait painting family) who travelled to Utrecht to become a pupil of Herman Saftleven. Otto Vorsterman had married the widow of the mayor of Zaltbommel, so young Vorstermans travelled to France with his inheritance money. When he returned, he lived with his sister in Zaltbommel, according to Gerard Hoet, who told this story to Houbraken. Vorstermans studied at Utrecht under Herman Sachtleven, to whom he became superior in landscape.

== Career ==
A vain man, instead of following his profession, he assumed the rank of a baron in Paris, maintaining a suite of servants. When he was under the greatest pressure from a large debt, he would pretend illness, seclude himself, and work industriously. In order to prove that he was not in want of money, he gave away some of his best pictures to persons of high rank. This extravagance did not last long, and in 1672, he was obliged to return to Utrecht. He was at his sister's from 1672 to 1674, before leaving for England. He left England after encountering financial difficulties, and accompanied the marquis de Béthune to France. In Nijmegen, the marquis employed him in painting several views on the Rhine. As the marquis' major-domo, Vorstermans purchased pictures for the marquis and carried them to France on his behalf.

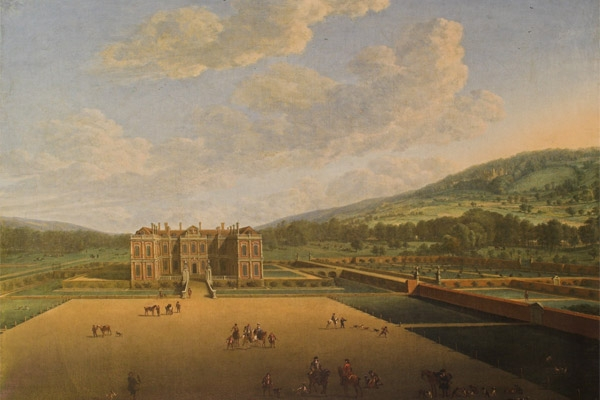
Althorp in 1677 by Johannes Vorstermans

After Vorstermans returned to England, he worked at the court of Charles II. His paintings include a chimney-piece at Whitehall, a view of the promenade in St. James's Park, a view of Stirling Castle, and particularly one of Windsor, for which Vorstermans demanded two hundred pounds. This was deemed exorbitant, and he did not receive even half the amount. The high prices which he put upon his works, and the bad use he made of his money, threw him into difficulties, and he was confined in prison for debt. Some of the English artists, however, who admired his talents, liberated him, and he resumed his work, though with little advantage, on account of the extravagant price which he demanded for his pictures. At the accession of James II, Sir William Soames being appointed ambassador to Constantinople, took Vosterman in his train, with a view to employ him in sketching views in the east, but the ambassador died during the trip. What became of Vorstermans after this is not known, but it is conjectured that he went to Poland, where he had been previously invited by his first patron, the marquis de Bethune. Vorstermans died in 1699. His pupil was Jan Soukens.

== Style ==
"That the works of Volterman are at present in the highest esteem is sufficiently evident, from their being bought up by the best judges of painting, almost at any price." —Matthew Pilkington (1798)

He surpassed, by many degrees, all the landscape painters of his time, in neatness of touch and delicacy of finishing. His taste was Flemish, but he worked up his pictures in an exquisite manner, and enriched them with small figures, which had exactness. His scenes were well chosen, and generally are views of the Rhine, designed with accuracy. In these views he constantly represents a large extent of country, diversified with hills, lawns, groves, and windings of the river, and comprised the most extensive scenes in a small compass. His tone of colouring is considering pleasing, and his touch is described as "tender, yet full of spirit".
