= Nobottle =

Hamlet in Northamptonshire, England

Coordinates: 52°15′43″N 1°00′57″W

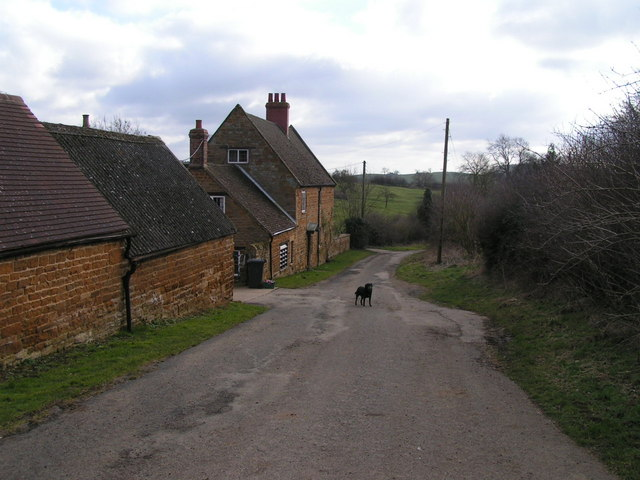
- Townsend Farm, Nobottle

- Location within Northamptonshire
- OS grid reference: SP672630
- Unitary authority: West Northamptonshire
- Ceremonial county: Northamptonshire
- Region: East Midlands
- Country: England
- Sovereign state: United Kingdom
- Post town: Northampton
- Postcode district: NN7
- Dialling code: 01604
- Police: Northamptonshire
- Fire: Northamptonshire
- Ambulance: East Midlands
- UK Parliament: Daventry

Nobottle is a hamlet in West Northamptonshire in England. The population is included in the civil parish of Brington. It borders the Althorp estate, which owns much of the property. Nobottle used to have a 600yd rifle range (the only one in Northamptonshire), now shut by the MOD some 20 years (local knowledge). The Midshires Way long distance footpath passes through Nobottle. A Roman building was excavated here in 1927-9 and a hoard of 814 coins found, spanning several hundred years, but mostly of the late 4th century.

The hamlet's name means 'New building'. Nobottle is in Brington parish.

With only 13 houses, about half a mile long, Nobottle is one of the smallest hamlets in England. However, Nobottle gave its name to a Saxon hundred, which at the time of Domesday Book (1086) was the location of the hundred court. In 1849 the Nobottle Hundred comprised 18 parishes, with 9,000 inhabitants, though the hamlet itself then only had 99 inhabitants.

Nobottle is a place name in the Shire in the north west corner of the map on the front endpapers of The Lord of the Rings by J.R.R. Tolkien. In The Treason of Isengard, book 7 of the History of Middle-earth series, Christopher Tolkien reveals that he added Nobottle to the map (with his father's permission) in 1943, though he did not at the time realize the town's name's origin, and thought it referred to the village being "so poor and remote that it did not even possess an inn". Earlier, the Tolkien scholar Tom Shippey had taken it that the author borrowed the unusual name from the Northamptonshire hamlet.
