= Brington, Northamptonshire =

Civil parish in Northamptonshire, England

Coordinates: 52.2748°N 1.0416°W

Brington
- Location within Northamptonshire
- Population: 496 (2011)
- OS grid reference: SP6564
- Unitary authority: West Northamptonshire
- Ceremonial county: Northamptonshire
- Region: East Midlands
- Country: England
- Sovereign state: United Kingdom
- Post town: Northampton
- Postcode district: NN7
- Dialling code: 01604
- Police: Northamptonshire
- Fire: Northamptonshire
- Ambulance: East Midlands
- UK Parliament: Daventry

Brington is a civil parish in West Northamptonshire in England. At the time of the 2001 census, the parish population was 482 people, increasing to 496 at the 2011 census.

It contains three villages:

- Great Brington
- Little Brington
- Nobottle

The name 'Brington' means 'Farm/settlement connected with Bryni'.

== History ==
In the time of William the Conqueror, who reigned from 1066 to 1087, Brington appears in the Domesday Book as the manor of Brinintone within the Hundred of Nobottle, one of many possessions of William Peverel.

== Notable people ==
- Thomas Bache (died 1410), originally from Genoa, an eminent judge and statesman in medieval Ireland, became vicar of Brington in 1378.
- Rev. Henry Holmes Stewart (1847–1937), who won the FA Cup with Wanderers in 1873, was rector at the parish church from 1878 to 1898.
