= Little Brington =

Village in Northamptonshire, England

Coordinates: 52.2681°N 1.0305°W

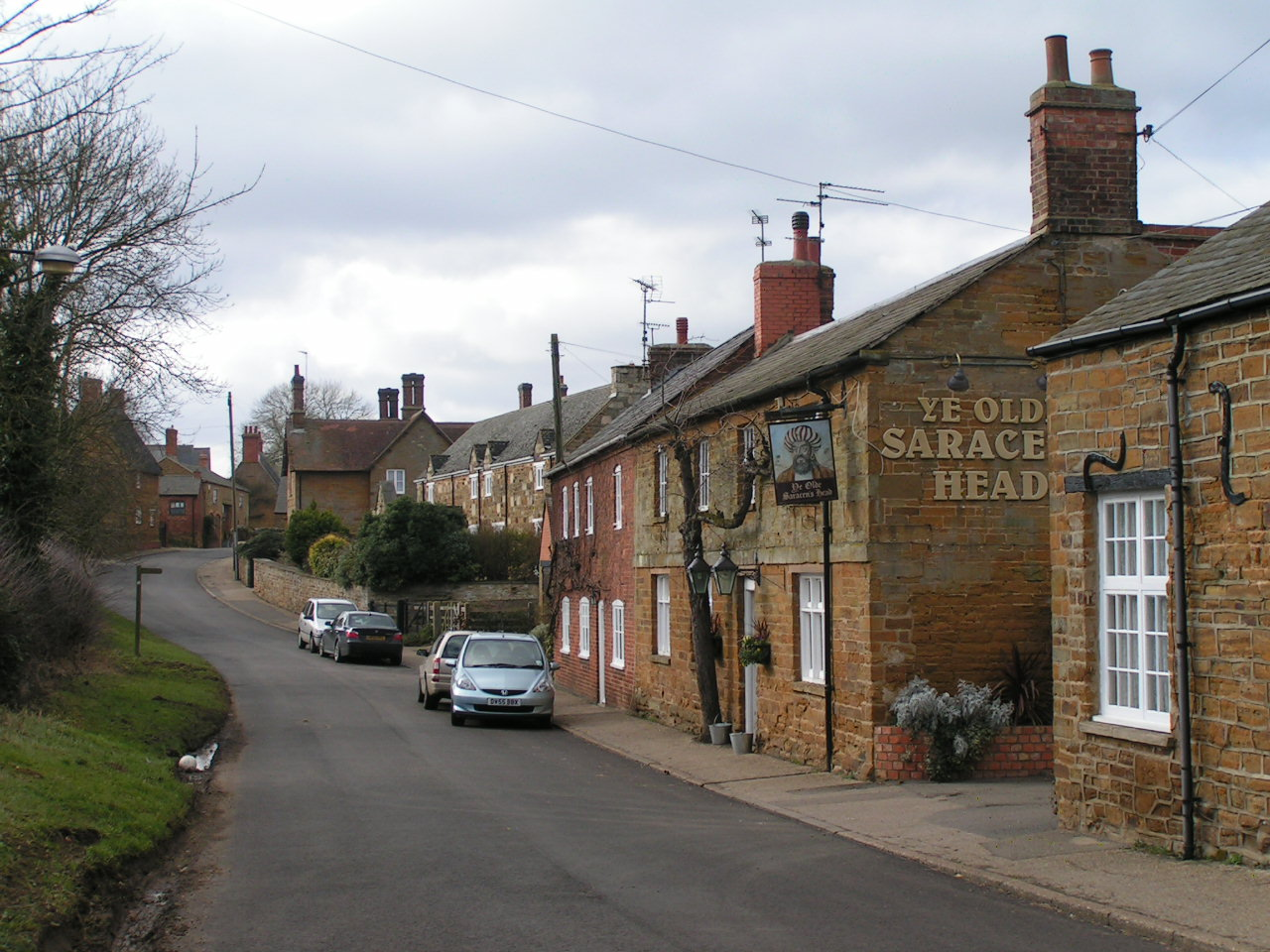

- Location within Northamptonshire
- OS grid reference: SP662637
- Unitary authority: West Northamptonshire
- Ceremonial county: Northamptonshire
- Region: East Midlands
- Country: England
- Sovereign state: United Kingdom
- Post town: Northampton
- Postcode district: NN7
- Dialling code: 01604
- Police: Northamptonshire
- Fire: Northamptonshire
- Ambulance: East Midlands
- UK Parliament: Daventry

Little Brington is a village in Brington and civil parish, in West Northamptonshire, England. It has one little school that currently holds around 50 children.

The villages name means 'Farm/settlement connected with Bryni'.

== Little Brington church ==
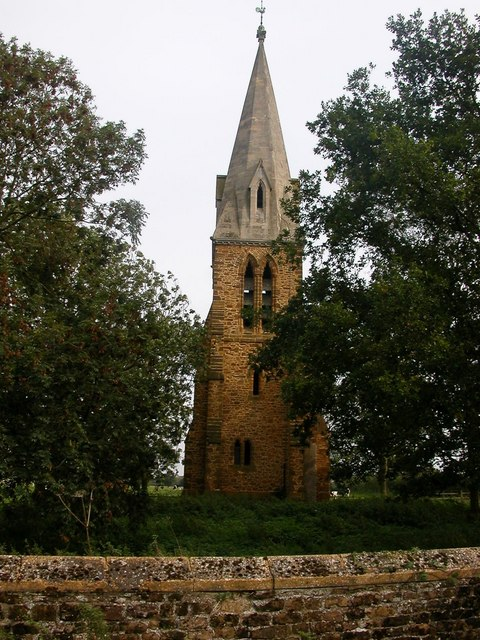
Little Brington church spire

Little Brington church is notable for having a spire but no nave. Frederick Spencer, 4th Earl Spencer (1798–1857) built the church of St John as a chapel of ease and a memorial to his first wife, the former Elizabeth Georgina Poyntz whom he had married in 1830.

The church consisted of a chancel, nave and tower with a tall spire and was built in the local brown ironstone of the area. In the 19th century and early in the 20th services were held on a regular basis. The Earl had provided the church for the convenience of villagers from Little Brington and Nobottle, who found it difficult to attend St. Mary's in Great Brington (almost 1 mile distant). St John's could seat approximately 150 people and was licensed for baptisms and marriages; funerals and burials were held in Great Brington St Mary's.

By the 1940s, the church had fallen into a state of disrepair, mainly because of a leaking roof. The main body of the church was demolished after the war in 1947. At the request of the Air Ministry, however, the distinctive tower with its octagonal spire was spared. It had become a landmark to navigators and likely serves the same purpose today. The spire, at grid reference SP663634, can be seen for many miles in every direction and is invariably a mystery to passersby; the narrow entrance to the circular staircase within the tower has been sealed up to deter vandals.

== Persons of note ==
The Australian cricket umpire Ted Wykes was born in Little Brington in 1921.
