= Wormleighton Manor =

Manor house in Warwickshire, England

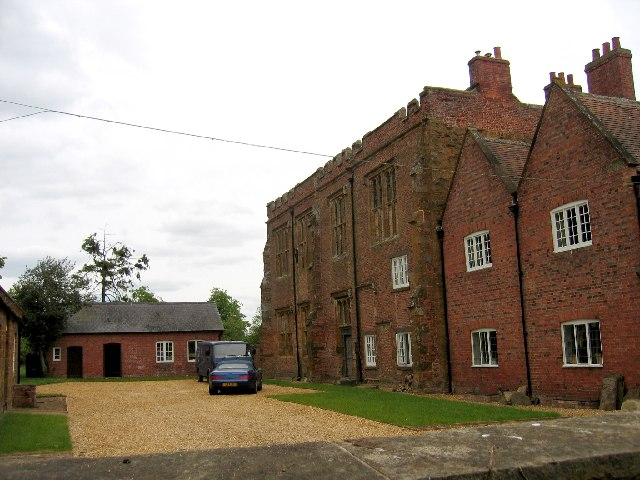
- Wormleighton Manor

- Location within Warwickshire

General information
- Architectural style: Tudor
- Location: Wormleighton, Warwickshire, England
- Coordinates: 52.18°N 1.345556°W
- Completed: 1512
- Demolished: 1645

Wormleighton Manor is a manor house in the civil parish of Wormleighton in the historic county of Warwickshire, England. It belonged to the Spencer family during the 16th and 17th century. Much of the house was burned down by Royalists during the English Civil War in 1645 and abandoned by the Spencers in favour of Althorp in Northamptonshire, which contains some materials salvaged from Wormleighton to this day. Today, all that is left of the manor, which was once four times the size of Althorp, is the Wormleighton Manor Gatehouse and Tower Cottage which is a Grade II listed building, and the northern range of the manor.

== History ==
Wormleighton Manor is a fine example of the Tudor architecture that appeared during the reign of Henry VIII. The wealthy Spencer family, who built their fortune on the production of wool in Warwickshire in the 15th century, first became linked to Wormleighton in 1469, when John Spencer became feoffee (feudal lord) and a tenant at Althorp in 1486. John Spencer's nephew, John, traded in livestock and other commodities and saved enough money to purchase both the Wormleighton and Althorp lands outright.

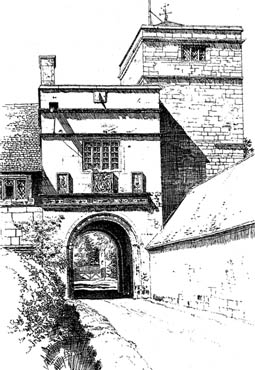
Wormleighton Manor gatehouse entrance in 1613 soon after completion.

Wormleighton was bought in 1506 from Sir William Cope; the manor house was completed in 1512. As the family wealth grew dramatically, John Spencer purchased the land at Althorp between 1509 and 1511 and constructed another residence there. In 1613, the gatehouse at the entrance of Wormleighton Manor was added by Sir Robert, first Lord Spencer, and he or his son are believed to have made alterations or enlargements also to the main building. The Spencer library accumulated at the manor to form a substantial collection which is now housed in London.

In 1645, Royalist forces from nearby Banbury set fire to Wormleighton Manor to prevent it becoming a parliamentary stronghold, causing extensive damage. As a result, Wormleighton Manor was abandoned by the Spencer family as a family residence after the English Civil War; they developed a distinguished home at Althorp which remains the Spencer seat to this day. Oak panelling in Althorp's tapestry dining room was brought from Wormleighton and reinstalled. Stained glass was also brought from Wormleighton Manor to Althorp in the 19th century and installed in Althorp's chapel.

In 1925, Americans Alexander and Virginia Weddell visited the property with architect Henry Grant Morse to get some inspiration on architectural features they could incorporate into a Tudor manor and former priory they had recently bought from Lloyds Bank in Warwickshire and had shipped to Richmond, Virginia. The eastern wing of Virginia House, completed in 1929, is said to be based on the design of Wormleighton Manor.

== Structure ==
=== Gatehouse ===
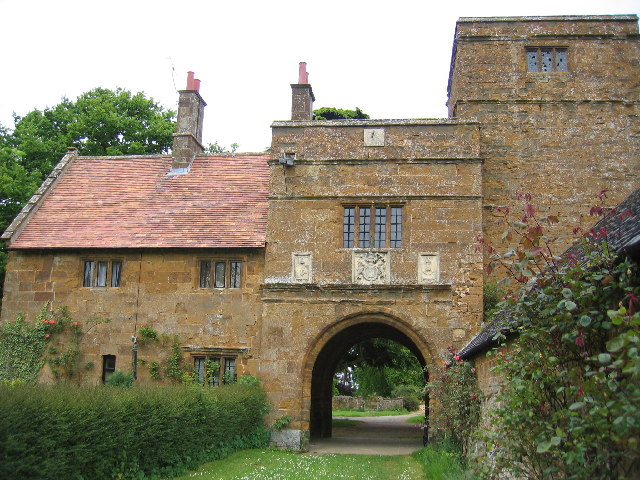
The gatehouse

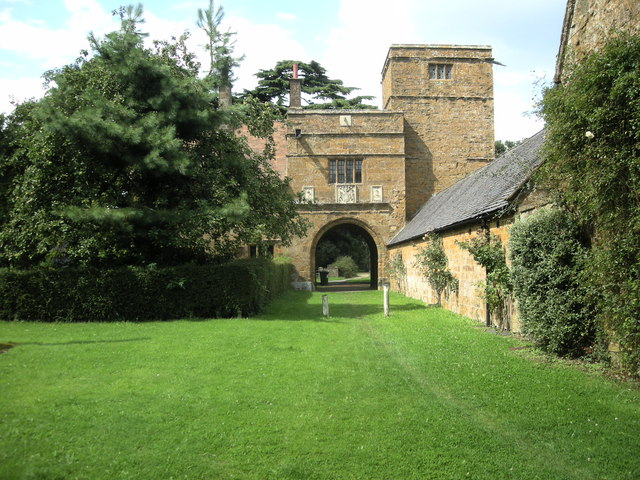
The buildings and gardens

The gatehouse, constructed in 1613, stands about 100 feet (30 m) south of the main building. It is of two storeys, built of yellow ashlar and is listed as a Grade II listed building. The archways are 11 feet (3.4 m) high and on the south have aged marigold central carvings and a sundial. On the north and west faces appear the arms of Spencer, distinguishable with its dragon and griffin supporters, while the south face has a central square panel displaying the royal Stuart arms, all dated to the original 1613 building.

Four-centred doorways are located in the side-walls of the gateway. The lower west lodge with a red tiled roof is about 27 feet (8.2 m) long outside and of two storeys, with a central chimney. The east tower at the side of the gateway is roughly 16 feet (4.9 m) wide with a four-light window on the lower part.

There are also the remains of a two-storey building about 80 feet (24 m) further south, believed to have once been part of the stable buildings which were rebuilt in the 17th century, and which today is a modern farm building.
