= William Spencer, 2nd Baron Spencer of Wormleighton =

English nobleman, politician (1591–1636)

The Right Honourable The Lord Spencer of Wormleighton
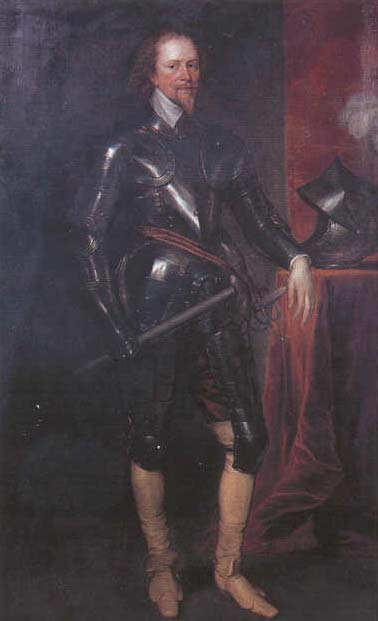
- William Spencer, 2nd Baron Spencer of Wormleighton
- Baptised: 4 January 1591
- Died: 19 December 1636 (aged 45)
- Spouse: Lady Penelope Wriothesley
- Children: 6 (including Henry Spencer, 1st Earl of Sunderland and Robert Spencer, 1st Viscount Teviot)
- Parent(s): Robert Spencer, 1st Baron Spencer of Wormleighton; Margaret Willoughby

William Spencer, 2nd Baron Spencer of Wormleighton (1591 – 19 December 1636) was an English nobleman, politician, and peer from the Spencer family.

== Life ==
Spencer was the second son of Robert Spencer, 1st Baron Spencer of Wormleighton, and his wife, Margaret Willoughby, and was baptised on 4 January 1591 at Brington, Northamptonshire. He matriculated at Magdalen College, Oxford with his elder brother John in October 1607. In the autumn of 1610 he traveled to France with his brother. On John's death at Blois in 1612, he became the heir to the barony. He became a Member of Parliament for Brackley in 1614, but left no trace in the records. As the member for Northamptonshire (1620–1622 & 1624–1627) he was an active participant in parliamentary sessions. From 6 May 1618 to 1621, Spencer held the office of Deputy Lieutenant of Northamptonshire. On 25 October 1627, he succeeded his father as 2nd Baron Spencer of Wormleighton.

== Family ==
Spencer married Lady Penelope Wriothesley, daughter of Henry Wriothesley, 3rd Earl of Southampton and Elizabeth Vernon in 1615. The couple had a number of children, including:

- Henry Spencer, 1st Earl of Sunderland
- Robert Spencer, 1st Viscount Teviot
- William (1630–88) married Elizabeth Gerard, daughter of Dutton, lord Gerard of Gerard's Bromley.
- Elizabeth married John Craven, 1st Baron Craven of Ryton
- Anne married Sir Robert Townshend, gentleman of the privy chamber to Charles II
- Margaret married Anthony Ashley Cooper, 1st Earl of Shaftesbury
- Alice, married Henry Moore, 1st Earl of Drogheda

He died on 19 December 1636, aged 44.

== Ancestry ==
Ancestors of William Spencer, 2nd Baron Spencer of Wormleighton

16. Sir William Spencer
8. Sir John Spencer
17. Susan Knightley
4. Sir John Spencer
18. Sir Thomas Kitson
9. Katherine Kitson
19. Margaret Donnington
2. Robert Spencer, 1st Baron Spencer of Wormleighton
20. Thomas Catlyn
10. Sir Robert Catlyn
5. Mary Catlyn
22. John Boles
11. Ann Boles
23. Alice Devenish
1. William Spencer, 2nd Baron Spencer of Wormleighton
24. Edward Willoughby
12. Sir Henry Willoughby
25. Anne Filliol
6. Sir Francis Willoughby
26. Thomas Grey, 2nd Marquess of Dorset
13. Anne Grey
27. Margaret Wotton
3. Margaret Willoughby
28. John Littleton
14. John Littleton
29. Elizabeth Talbot
7. Elizabeth Littleton
30. John Pakington
15. Bridget Pakington
31. Anne Dacres

Political offices
Preceded by The Earl of Westmorland	Custos Rotulorum of Northamptonshire; 1629–1636	Succeeded by Sir Christopher Hatton
Parliament of England
Preceded by Sir Edward Montagu; William Tate	Member of Parliament for Northamptonshire with Sir Edward Montagu 1620–1621; Sir Richard Knightley 1621–1626; Sir John Pickering 1626–1627; 1620–1627	Succeeded by Francis Nicolls; Sir Richard Knightley
Peerage of England
Preceded by Robert Spencer	Baron Spencer of Wormleighton; 1627–1636	Succeeded by Henry Spencer
