= Mother Hubbard (disambiguation) =

Mother Hubbard may refer to:

- "Old Mother Hubbard", a nursery rhyme
- Mother Hubbard dress, from the South Seas
- Mother Hubbard, another name for a camelback steam locomotive

== See also ==
- Mother Hubberd's Tale, a poem by Edmund Spenser
