= Elizabeth Spencer, Baroness Hunsdon =

English noblewoman, scholar, and patron of the arts (1552–1618

Elizabeth Spencer
- Baroness Hunsdon
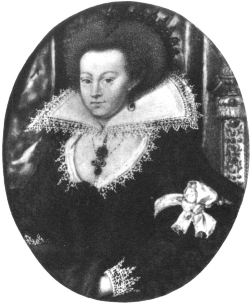
- Born: 29 June 1552; Althorp, Northamptonshire
- Died: 25 February 1618 (aged 65)
- Buried: Westminster Abbey, London
- Noble family: Spencer
- Spouses: George Carey, 2nd Baron Hunsdon; Ralph Eure, 3rd Baron Eure
- Issue: Elizabeth Carey, Lady Berkeley
- Father: Sir John Spencer
- Mother: Katherine Kitson

Elizabeth Spencer, Baroness Hunsdon (29 June 1552 – 25 February 1618) was an English noblewoman, scholar, and patron of the arts. She was the inspiration for Edmund Spenser's Muiopotmos, was commemorated in one of the poet's dedicatory sonnets to The Faerie Queene, and was represented as "Phyllis" in the latter's pastoral poem Colin Clouts Come Home Againe. She herself translated Petrarch. Her first husband was George Carey, 2nd Baron Hunsdon, grandson of Mary Boleyn, elder sister of Anne Boleyn, mother of Queen Elizabeth I.

== Family ==
Elizabeth Spencer was born 29 June 1552 at Althorp, Northamptonshire, the second eldest daughter of Sir John Spencer of Althorp and his wife Katherine Kitson, the daughter of Sir Thomas Kitson of Hengrave, Suffolk. She had three brothers, Sir John Spencer, Sir William Spencer, and Sir Richard Spencer; and three sisters, Anne Spencer, Baroness Mounteagle, Katherine Spencer, and Alice Spencer. In the year of her birth, Elizabeth's father held the office of High Sheriff of Northamptonshire, and the following year was Member of Parliament for Northamptonshire.

== Marriages ==
On 29 December 1574, by licence from Matthew Parker, the Archbishop of Canterbury, Elizabeth married her first husband, George Carey, the eldest son of Henry Carey, 1st Baron Hunsdon and Anne Morgan. As a grandson of Mary Boleyn, sister of Queen Anne Boleyn, George Carey was closely related to Queen Elizabeth I who held the Hunsdons in high favour. From 23 July 1596, when her husband succeeded to the title, Elizabeth was styled Baroness Hunsdon.

George Carey and Elizabeth Spencer had an only daughter, Elizabeth Carey, who married firstly, Sir Thomas Berkeley, son and heir apparent of Henry Berkeley, 7th Baron Berkeley, by whom she had issue. She married secondly, Sir Thomas Chamberlain. Like her mother, Lady Berkeley had scholarly interests and became a patron of the arts.

Elizabeth's husband, Baron Hunsdon died in 1603. Shortly before January 1613, she married her second husband, Ralph Eure, 3rd Baron Eure.

== Patron of the arts ==
Elizabeth was a noted patron of the arts and a scholar. She translated Petrarch's works, She was the inspiration for Edmund Spenser's Muiopotmos in 1590, and she was represented as "Phyllis" in his pastoral poem Colin Clouts Come Home Againe, with her sisters Anne and Alice representing "Charyllis" and "Amaryllis". Elizabeth was also commemorated in one of Spenser's dedicatory sonnets to The Faerie Queene:

"Ne may I, without blot of endless blame,
You, fairest Lady leave out of this place,
Remembrance of your gracious name
Wherewith that courtly garlond most ye grace
And deck the world."

Besides Edmund Spenser, to whom she was distantly related, she was a patron of Thomas Nashe and the composer John Dowland, who mentions her in his First Book of Songs (1597) and wrote for her a short almain known as Lady Hunsdon's Puffe.

Elizabeth's miniature portrait was painted by Nicholas Hilliard on an unknown date.

== Death ==
Elizabeth died on 25 February 1618, and was buried on 2 March in Westminster Abbey, London.
