= John Spencer (sheriff) =

Member of the Parliament of England

Sir John Spencer
- Spencer Arms
- Born: 1524; Althorp, Northamptonshire
- Died: 8 November 1586; Althorp, Northamptonshire
- Buried: St Mary the Virgin Church, Great Brington
- Noble family: Spencer
- Spouse: Katherine Kitson
- Issue: John Spencer; Elizabeth Spencer, Baroness Hunsdon; Alice Spencer, Countess of Derby; William Spencer; Richard Spencer; Anne Spencer, Countess of Dorset
- Father: William Spencer
- Mother: Susan Knightley

Sir John Spencer (1524 – 8 November 1586) was an English nobleman, politician, knight, sheriff, landowner, and Member of Parliament. He was an early member of the Spencer family.

== Life and family ==
Spencer was the son and heir of Sir William Spencer of Wormleighton Manor, Warwickshire, and Althorp, Northamptonshire, and his wife Susan Knightley, daughter of Sir Richard Knightley of Fawsley, Northamptonshire. His grandfather had purchased the manor of Wormleighton in 1506 He was 8, when his father died in 1532. Despite the efforts of his mother and two uncles to avoid it, his wardship was granted to Sir Giles Alington. Spencer was probably trained in law at the Middle Temple.

He was knighted on 2 October 1553, the day after Mary I's coronation.

He was appointed Sheriff of Northamptonshire for 1551–52, 1558–59, 1571–72 and 1583–84. He was elected as a Knight of the Shire (MP) for Northamptonshire in April 1554, and again in 1558.

== Marriage and issue ==
Spencer married, by 1545, Katherine Kitson, the daughter of Sir Thomas Kitson of the City of London and of Hengrave Hall, Suffolk. They had five sons and six daughters, including

- Sir John Spencer (died 1600), who succeeded to his father's estates at Wormleighton and Althorp
- Elizabeth Spencer, Baroness Hunsdon
- Alice Spencer, who married Ferdinando Stanley, 5th Earl of Derby. Their daughter Anne (1580–1647) was heiress presumptive to the English throne upon the death of Elizabeth I according to the will of Henry VIII and the Third Succession Act. As Countess of Derby, Alice was a noted patron of the arts. The poet Edmund Spenser represented her as the character "Amaryllis" in his eclogue Colin Clouts Come Home Againe (1595) and she was the dedicatee of his poem The Teares of the Muses (1591).
- Sir William Spencer, the third son, who became a landowner in Yarnton, Oxfordshire. His son Thomas was Member of Parliament for Woodstock 1604-1611, and was created Baronet of Yarnton on 29 June 1611 in the Baronetage of England.
- Sir Richard Spencer, the fourth son, whose son John was a landowner in Offley Place, Great Offley, Hertfordshire, and was created Baronet of Offley on 14 March 1627 in the Baronetage of England.
- Anne Spencer, who married (1) William Stanley, 3rd Baron Monteagle, and (2) Henry Compton, 1st Baron Compton, and (3) Robert Sackville, 2nd Earl of Dorset
- Mary Spencer, who married Sir Edward Aston.
- Catherine Spencer, who married Thomas Leigh and was mother of Alice Leigh, second wife of Robert Dudley, natural son of Robert, 1st Earl of Leicester.

Sir John Spencer died on 8 November 1586, and was buried with his wife Katherine Kitson in St Mary the Virgin Church, Great Brington (the parish church for Althorp) where his epitaph lists his sons, his daughters and their husbands. He was succeeded by his eldest son, Sir John Spencer (died 1600).
