= Anne Stanley, Countess of Castlehaven =

English noblewoman

Anne Stanley
- Countess of Castlehaven, previously Baroness Chandos
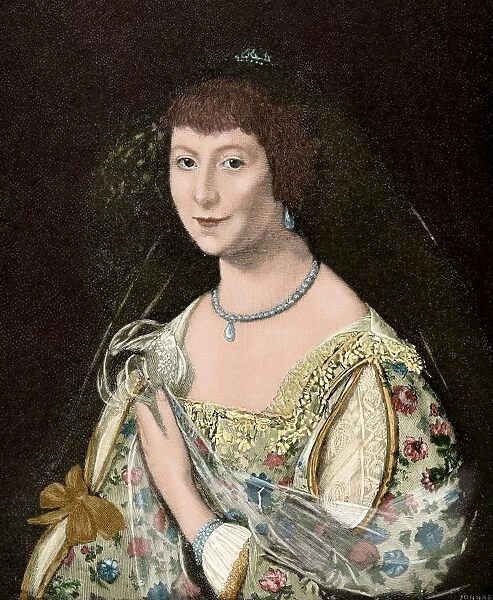
- Born: May 1580
- Died: c. 8 October 1647
- Noble family: Stanley
- Spouses: Grey Brydges, 5th Baron Chandos; Mervyn Tuchet, 2nd Earl of Castlehaven
- Issue: Robert Brydges; Anne Brydges; Elizabeth Brydges; George Brydges, 6th Baron Chandos; William Brydges, 7th Baron Chandos
- Father: Ferdinando Stanley, 5th Earl of Derby
- Mother: Alice Spencer, Countess of Derby

Anne Stanley (May 1580 – c. 8 October 1647) was an English noblewoman. She was the eldest daughter of the Earl of Derby and, through her two marriages, became Baroness Chandos and later Countess of Castlehaven. She was a distant relative of Elizabeth I of England and for some time was seen as a possible heir to the English throne.

In 1630, her second husband, the Earl of Castlehaven, was arrested and charged with being an accomplice to her rape by a servant. He was also accused of sodomy, found guilty and sentenced to death.

Anne Stanley's testimony against her husband was crucial in ensuring his conviction and set the precedent that a wife could give evidence against her husband. After the trial, she lived a very secluded life; her reputation had been severely damaged by the scandal.

== Possible heir to the throne ==
Anne Stanley was the daughter of Ferdinando Stanley, 5th Earl of Derby, and Alice Spencer.

The earls of Derby were among the most influential and prominent noble families in England. Ferdinando Stanley was a great-grandson of Mary Tudor, the younger sister of King Henry VIII. Henry VIII had stipulated in his will that in the line of succession Mary's descendants would follow immediately after his own children. In doing so, he excluded the Kings of Scotland, descendants of his elder sister Margaret. By 1580, it was obvious that Queen Elizabeth I would have no children, and this focused attention on the Earl of Derby as a possible future king. After his death in 1594, opinion in the matter of the succession began to favour King James VI of Scotland who, in 1603, indeed succeeded Elizabeth I. However, some believed that this succession was contrary to the will of Henry VIII, and therefore illegal. Anne Stanley herself never made a claim to the throne.

== Childhood, family and first marriage ==
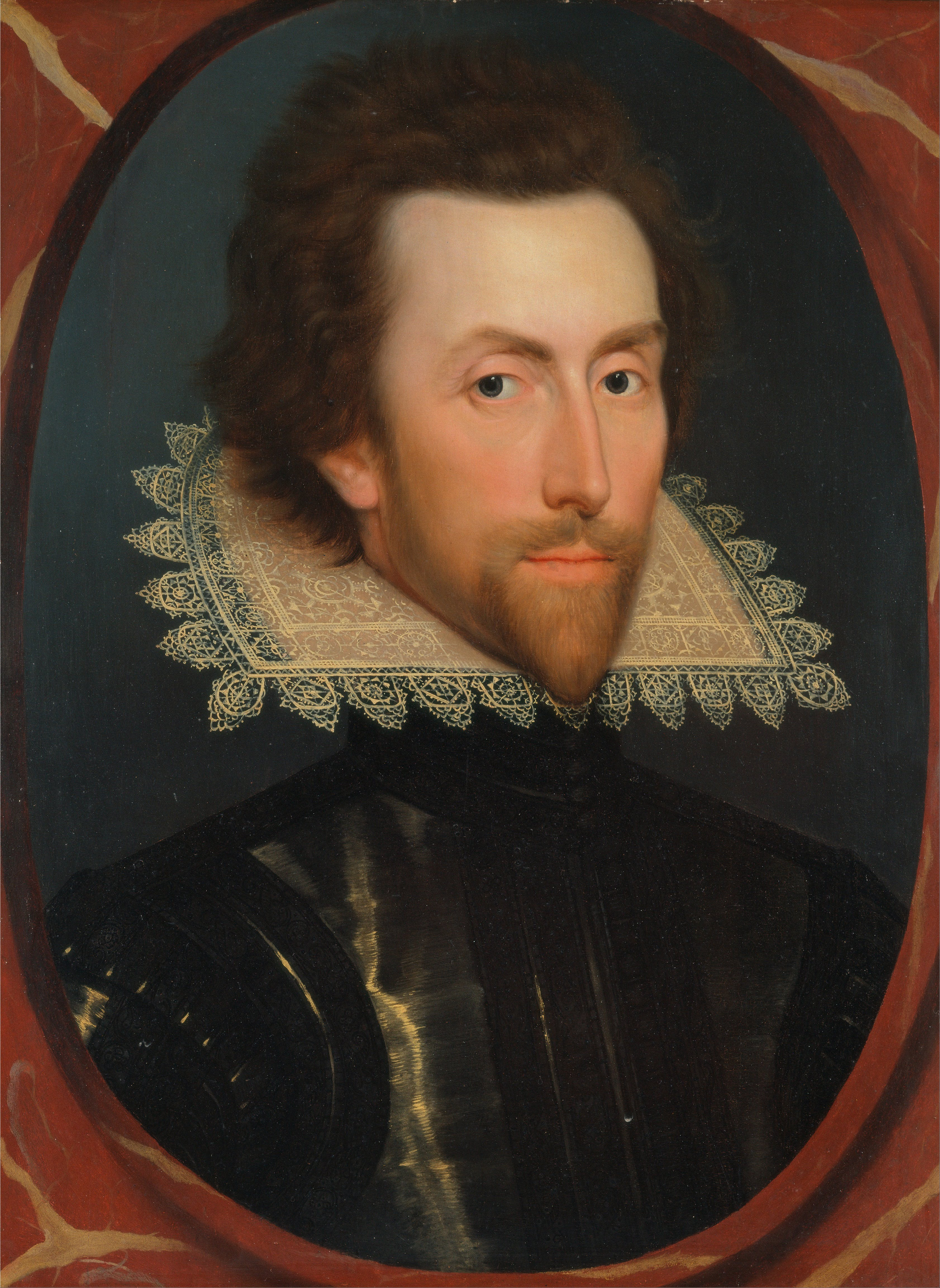
Grey Brydges, baron Chandos, first husband of Anne Stanley

Anne Stanley was the eldest of three daughters. When Ferdinando Stanley died, they inherited his considerable fortune. The title Earl of Derby went to his younger brother William. For Anne and her sisters Frances and Elizabeth prestigious husbands were sought. Frances married John Egerton, who became the 1st Earl of Bridgewater; Elizabeth married Henry Hastings, 5th Earl of Huntingdon. There were plans for Anne to marry a son of the Tsar of Muscovy. This marriage did not come about, and in 1607 she married the very wealthy Gray Brydges, Baron Chandos of Sudeley, who was known as the King of the Cotswolds. She lived with him in great style in Sudeley Castle. They had at least five children.

The Dowager Countess of Derby and her three daughters had access to an extensive network of highly influential people, including the royal court. The Dowager Countess and her daughter Elizabeth, Countess of Huntingdon, were politically active and promoted the interests of their family through that network. All four Stanley women were interested in drama and poetry, and supported theatre groups, writers and poets, including Edmund Spenser, John Donne and John Milton.

== Marriage to Earl of Castlehaven ==
In 1621 Anne Stanley's husband Baron Chandos died. Three years later she married the widower Mervyn Touchet, Earl of Castlehaven (ca. 1593–1631). This marriage was controversial. The title Earl of Castlehaven had only been granted to the Touchet family in 1616. Furthermore, it was a title in the Irish peerage and therefore seen by the old English aristocracy as somewhat inferior. Lord Castlehaven was also more than ten years younger than his new wife, had previously shown Catholic sympathies and generally not behaved in the manner expected of a nobleman. It was felt that Anne Stanley, who was connected to the most important and oldest noble families of England, had married beneath her. However, Lord Castlehaven was rich and Anne Stanley was described by her mother as a spendthrift.

The Earl and Countess of Castlehaven lived mainly in Fonthill Gifford, the country seat of the Touchets in southern England. Some time after their marriage Anne Stanley's eldest daughter Elizabeth Brydges married James, the eldest son of Lord Castlehaven (1612–1684) who used the courtesy title Lord Audley. Elizabeth was probably twelve years old at the time. It was not unusual for a stepbrother and stepsister to marry, as a way to ensure that wealth remained within the family. The marriage was not a success and Lord Audley left Fonthill Gifford while his wife Elizabeth continued to live there.

== Accusations ==
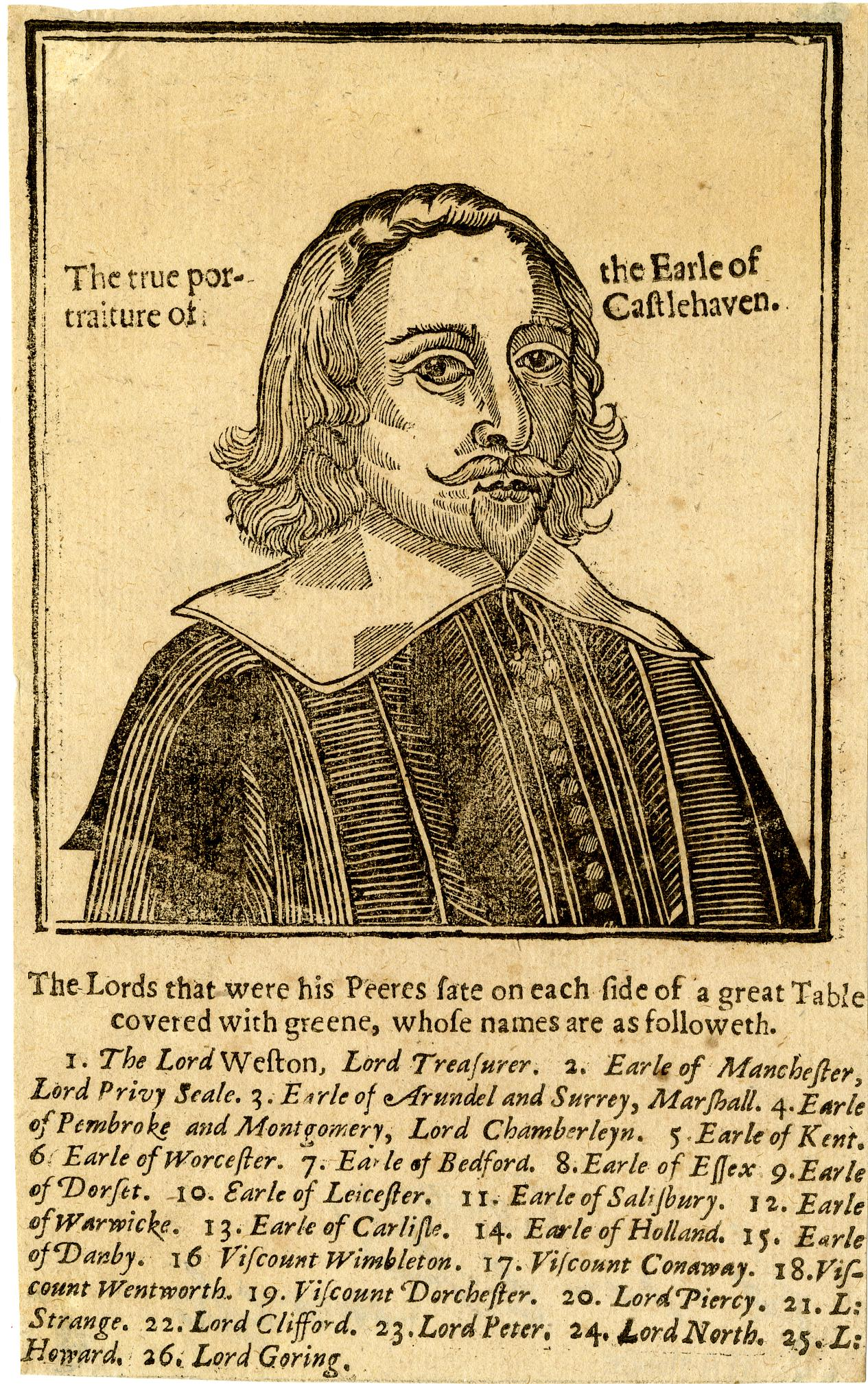
Mervyn Touchet, Earl of Castlehaven, second husband of Anne Stanley. The names of the members of the jury in his trial are listed below the image.

In 1630 Lord Audley, Lord Castlehaven's son, appealed to the Privy Council stating that his father was planning to disown him. Audley claimed that his father had encouraged his (Audley's) wife Elizabeth to have sex with Henry Skipwith, a favorite servant of Castlehaven's. Should Elizabeth become pregnant by Skipwith, Castlehaven planned to make this child his heir, thus depriving his own son of his inheritance. Audley also stated that his stepmother Anne Stanley behaved in a lewd manner and had taken servants as her lovers.

The Privy Council started an investigation in November 1630 and interviewed family members and servants at Fonthill Gifford. Elizabeth Audley admitted to having been coerced by her father-in-law into having a sexual relationship with Skipwith. According to Elizabeth Audley, her mother Anne Stanley had been raped by one of the servants at the instigation of Lord Castlehaven. When questioned about this, Anne Stanley testified that soon after their marriage, Castlehaven had declared that as a husband he had absolute control over his wife's body, and that she was obliged to do whatever he demanded. He had ordered her several times to sleep with one of his servants, but she had always refused. Eventually, Castlehaven had ordered the page Giles Broadway to rape her in his presence; he had assisted in the rape by restraining his wife. Anne Stanley stated that she had made a suicide attempt after the rape, but she had never discussed the incident with anyone.

The inhabitants of Fonthill Gifford told the Privy Council's investigators that Lord Castlehaven had sexual relations with both male and female staff, including the footman Lawrence Fitzpatrick, and that he was a voyeur. He showered his sexual partners with gifts and had his eldest daughter marry one of his favorites, who had joined the household as a page. Anne Stanley's account of the rape and her subsequent suicide attempt was confirmed, also by the alleged rapist Giles Broadway. The investigators recorded only the testimony of male servants; women were considered unreliable witnesses, especially if they were of lower class.

Lord Castlehaven was formally charged with the rape of his wife and sodomy with the servant Lawrence Fitzpatrick on 6 April 1631. He was imprisoned in the Tower and his properties were confiscated by the Crown. Giles Broadway was charged with the rape of Anne Stanley, and Lawrence Fitzpatrick was charged with sodomy. Anne Stanley was ordered by the Privy Council to temporarily take up residence with the Bishop of Winchester. Her younger children from her first marriage were placed in the care of their grandmother, the Dowager Countess of Derby. The Dowager Countess was not prepared to take in her granddaughter Elizabeth, Lady Audley, who she feared would be a bad influence on her younger siblings.

Lord Castlehaven denied all charges and claimed his wife and son were conspiring against him. He called his wife a whore, to whose statements no value should be attached, and accused her of having given birth to an illegitimate child during their marriage. The servants who had made incriminating statements against him had done so out of spite and jealousy, he said.

== Trial ==
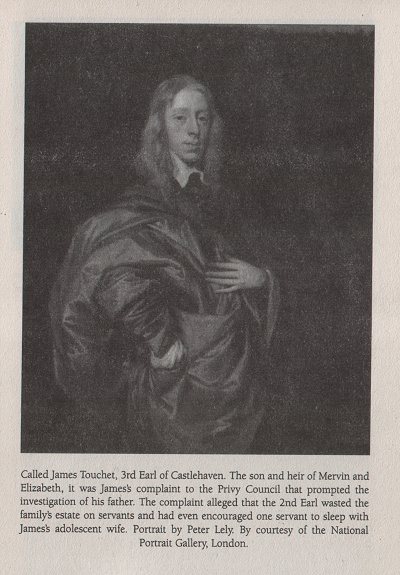
James Touchet, Baron Audley, was Anne Stanley's stepson and son in law. His complaint to the Privy Council led to his father's trial and execution.

In the 17th century, rape and sodomy were seen as serious, morally reprehensible crimes; they were capital offences but prosecution and convictions were rare. It was certainly unusual for a peer to be prosecuted for either rape or sodomy. Prosecution for rape occurred mainly if another offense had also been committed, or if the rape was considered to be a flagrant violation of social order. Rape within marriage was not recognized by law; the charge of rape made against Lord Castlehaven related to his complicity in the rape of Anne Stanley by Giles Broadway. In the case of people of high rank, the charge of sodomy was usually added to charges such as conspiracy or corruption, and served mainly to raise doubts about the moral character of the accused.

The trial of Lord Castlehaven was remarkable in that the judges explicitly ruled that a woman could testify against her husband in criminal proceedings, especially if she was a victim. This had previously not been clear under English law and set an important precedent. In response to a question by Lord Castlehaven whether it could legally be called rape if the victim was a woman of loose morals, the judges responded that the reputation of the woman did not matter. They also ruled that it was irrelevant that Anne Stanley herself had never spoken out about the rape by Broadway.

The trial of Lord Castlehaven began on 25 April 1631 and lasted just one day. The jury consisted of 27 men from the nobility. Of these, at least ten had close ties to the Stanley family. There is little doubt that Anne Stanley's influential mother and sisters made efforts to influence the case in their favour. Anne Stanley and her daughter Elizabeth Audley did not appear in court; it was unthinkable that a noblewoman would speak publicly about sexual matters. Their statements were read out. The prosecutors emphasized the fact that Lord Castlehaven's behaviour was immoral and unworthy of a nobleman. On 26 April the jury unanimously found Lord Castlehaven guilty of rape, and a majority also found him guilty of sodomy. He was sentenced to death.

The Touchet family urged King Charles I to pardon Lord Castlehaven, arguing that Anne Stanley was a promiscuous woman and an unreliable witness. The King, however, refused, and Castlehaven was beheaded on 14 May 1631 on Tower Hill. He maintained his innocence to the last.

The trial of Giles Broadway and Lawrence Fitzpatrick took place in June 1631. Both withdrew the confessions they had made during the trial of Lord Castlehaven, possibly because they had been falsely promised immunity, and claimed they were innocent. Anne Stanley was present in court to declare under oath that her recorded statement was true. Broadway was found guilty of rape, and Fitzpatrick found guilty of sodomy. They were hanged on 6 July 1631. On the scaffold, Broadway declared Anne Stanley to be the most wicked woman who ever lived; he claimed she had sexual relations with servants and had killed her own child.

== Later life ==
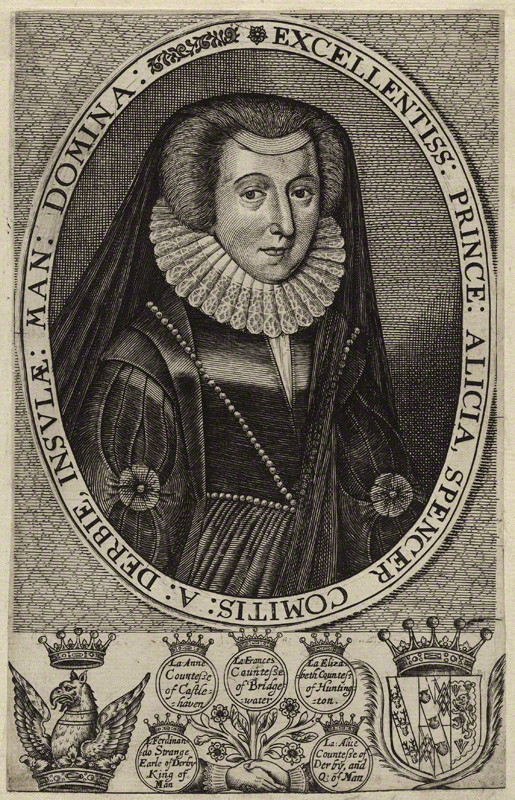
Alice Spencer, countess of Derby, the influential mother of Anne Stanley

After the execution of her husband, Anne Stanley withdrew from public life. She always maintained that she was blameless. However, already during the trial pamphlets had been published that questioned her innocence or even identified her as the evil mastermind behind the events in Fonthill Gifford.

Lord Castlehaven's sister, the poet and Protestant prophetess Eleanor Davies Touchet, wrote a number of these leaflets. The fact that both Lord Castlehaven and Giles Broadway had portrayed her as immoral and evil minutes before they were executed further damaged her reputation.

In the years after the trial, Anne Stanley lived with her mother, the Dowager Countess of Derby, who managed to obtain a formal pardon from the King for Anne Stanley's "sexual immorality and debauchery". It was common at that time to grant pardons when people had transgressed against their will.

The possessions of the Earl of Castlehaven were confiscated by the Crown after his death. Anne Stanley was financially dependent on the income she still received from the estate of her first husband, and on the support from her mother and brothers-in-law. After the death of her mother in 1637, she moved to Heydons House in Harefield, where she died in 1647.

== Legacy ==
It has been argued that the masque Comus by John Milton refers to the Castlehaven scandal. This work describes the triumph of chastity over debauchery; it was written by Milton in 1634 for the Earl of Bridgewater, who was married to Anne Stanley's sister Frances.

The trial of Lord Castlehaven remained notorious well into the 18th century. In the 17th century it was often presented in an anti-Catholic or anti-monarchist context. In the 18th century it was cited as an example of immoral behavior by the aristocracy. After about 1750 the case was largely forgotten, though it remained known by legal historians.

In the 21st century, the Castlehaven affair was explored by LGBT- and gender studies scholars, as a landmark case in the development of the relationship between the state and sexuality, and the position of women under the law.

== Children ==
Anne Stanley and her first husband Gray Brydges, 5th Baron Chandos of Sudeley, had the following children:

- Elizabeth Brydges, deceased March 1678/79
- Robert Brydges, deceased on 20 June 1611
- Anne Brydges, believed to have been born in 1612 and married to gentleman described as Mr. Torteson. Few facts about her life but many older genealogies show her.
- George Brydges, 6th Baron Chandos of Sudeley, 9 August 1620 – February 1654/55
- William Brydges, 7th Baron Chandos of Sudeley, circa 1620 - August 1676.

== Ancestry ==
Ancestors of Anne Stanley, Countess of Castlehaven

16. Thomas Stanley, 2nd Earl of Derby
8. Edward Stanley, 3rd Earl of Derby
17. Anne Hastings
4. Henry Stanley, 4th Earl of Derby
18. Thomas Howard, 2nd Duke of Norfolk
9. Lady Dorothy Howard
19. Agnes Tilney
2. Ferdinando Stanley, 5th Earl of Derby
20. Henry Clifford, 1st Earl of Cumberland
10. Henry Clifford, 2nd Earl of Cumberland
21. Margaret Percy
5. Lady Margaret Clifford
22. Charles Brandon, 1st Duke of Suffolk
11. Lady Eleanor Brandon
23. Mary Tudor
1. Anne Stanley, Countess of Castlehaven
24. Sir John Spencer
12. Sir William Spencer
25. Isabella Graunt
6. Sir John Spencer
26. Sir Richard Knightley
13. Susan Knightley
27. Eleanor Throckmorton
3. Lady Alice Spencer
28. Robert Kitson
14. Thomas Kitson
29. Margaret Smyth
7. Katherine Kitson
30. John Donnington
15. Margaret Donnington
31. Elizabeth Pye
