= Alice Spencer, Countess of Derby =

English noblewoman (1559–1637)

Alice Spencer
- Countess of Derby; Baroness Ellesmere; Viscountess Brackley
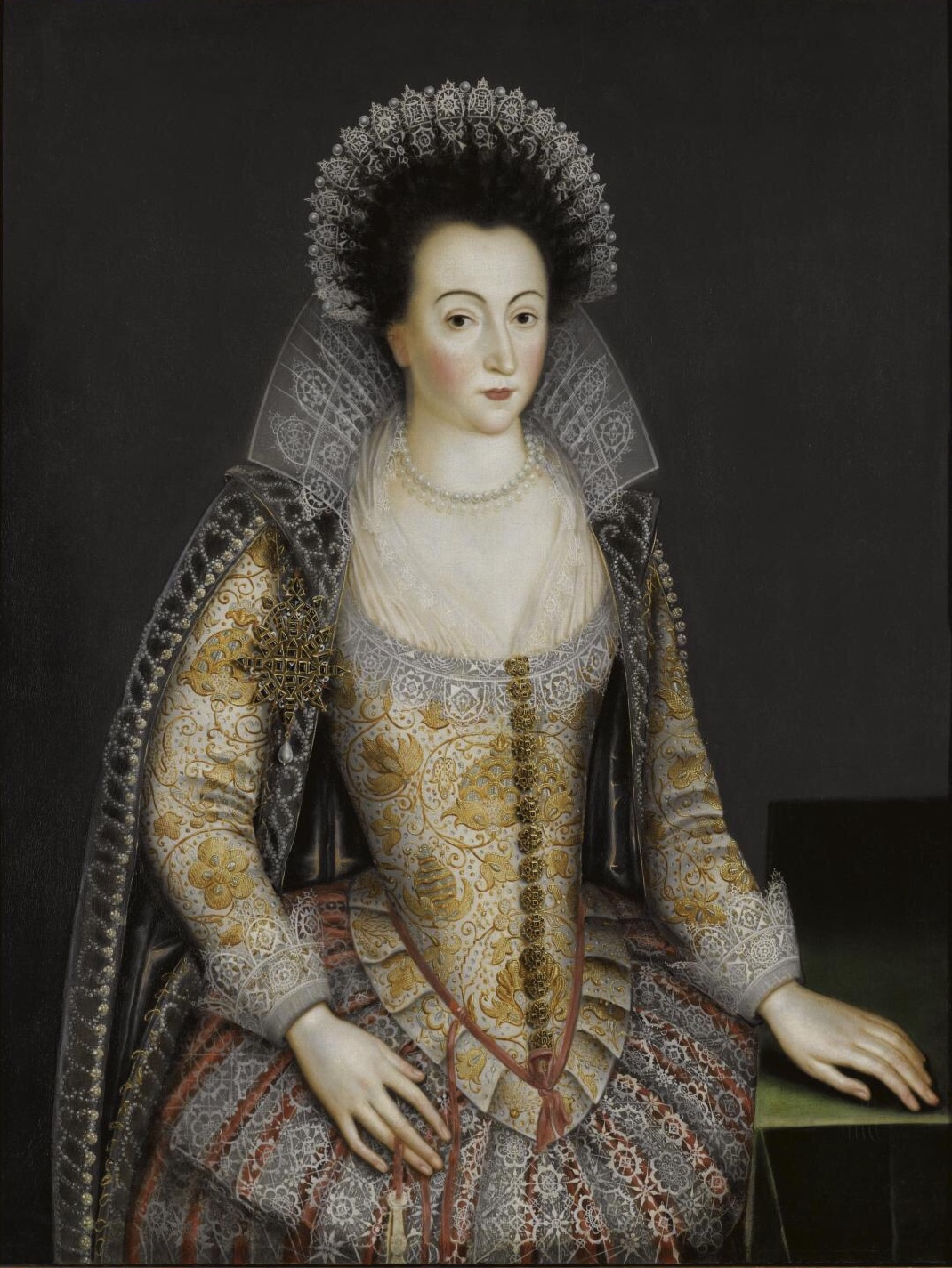
- Portrait tentatively identified as Alice Spencer, painted by an unknown artist in the circle of Marcus Gheeraerts the Younger
- Born: 4 May 1559; Althorp, Northamptonshire, England
- Died: 23 January 1637 (aged 77); Harefield Place, Middlesex
- Buried: St Mary the Virgin Church, Harefield
- Noble family: Spencer
- Spouses: Ferdinando Stanley, 5th Earl of Derby; Thomas Egerton, 1st Viscount Brackley
- Issue: Anne Stanley, Countess of Castlehaven; Frances Egerton, Countess of Bridgewater; Elizabeth Hastings, Countess of Huntingdon
- Father: Sir John Spencer
- Mother: Katherine Kitson

Alice Spencer, Countess of Derby (4 May 1559 – 23 January 1637) was an English noblewoman from the Spencer family and noted patron of the arts. Poet Edmund Spenser represented her as "Amaryllis" in his eclogue Colin Clouts Come Home Againe (1595) and dedicated his poem The Teares of the Muses (1591) to her.

Her first husband was Ferdinando Stanley, 5th Earl of Derby, a claimant to the English throne. Alice's eldest daughter, Anne Stanley, Countess of Castlehaven, was heiress presumptive to Queen Elizabeth I. She married secondly in 1600 Thomas Egerton, 1st Viscount Brackley and thus became a member of the Egerton family.

== Family ==
Alice was born in Althorp, Northamptonshire, England on 4 May 1559, the youngest daughter of Sir John Spencer, member of parliament and high sheriff of Northamptonshire, and Katherine Kytson. She had five brothers and five older sisters.

== Marriage and issue ==
In about 1579 Alice married her first husband, Ferdinando Stanley, heir to the Earldom of Derby, and a claimant to the English throne. His mother, Lady Margaret Clifford, was heir presumptive to Queen Elizabeth I from 1578 until her death in 1596. On 25 September 1593, he succeeded as Earl of Derby and Lord of Mann; from that date onwards, Alice was styled as the Countess of Derby.

Together Ferdinando and Alice had three daughters:

- Lady Anne Stanley (May 1580 – c. October 1647), married firstly Grey Brydges, 5th Baron Chandos of Sudeley, by whom she had issue; secondly Mervyn Tuchet, 2nd Earl of Castlehaven, by whom she had issue.
- Lady Frances Stanley (1 May 1583 – 11 March 1636), married John Egerton, 1st Earl of Bridgewater, by whom she had issue.
- Lady Elizabeth Stanley (6 January 1588 – 20 January 1633), married Henry Hastings, 5th Earl of Huntingdon, by whom she had issue.

Her husband died on 16 April 1594, and when his mother died two years later, Alice's eldest daughter, Anne became heiress presumptive to Queen Elizabeth I. Upon the Queen's death in 1603, however, the crown passed to King James VI of Scotland who was descended from Margaret Tudor, the elder sister of King Henry VIII, whereas the Stanleys were descended from his younger sister, Mary Tudor, Queen of France.

For a month after his death, his company of players performed at their home of Lathom House, Lancashire as The Countess of Derby's Men. They had been at Lathom House shortly before the Earl's death and had been known then as the Earl of Derby's Men.

On 20 October 1600, she married her second husband Thomas Egerton, 1st Viscount Brackley, who on 21 July 1603 became Baron Ellesmere, and on 7 November 1616 Viscount Brackley. Less than two years after his own marriage to Alice, Thomas's son John (by his first wife, Elizabeth Ravenscroft) married Alice's second eldest daughter Lady Frances.

Together Alice and her new husband founded the Bridgewater Library.

In 1601, Thomas Egerton bought Harefield Place in Middlesex, and in July 1602, the Queen was entertained at Harefield by the Egertons. In August 1607 Alice was welcomed at Ashby de la Zouch Castle with the Masque at Ashby Castle and in April 1613 she joined Anne of Denmark's progress to Bath.

Lady Alice had Haydon Hall in Eastcote built in 1630 after she became concerned that Lord Castlehaven would attempt to claim her estate in the event of her death. After she died in 1637, her eldest daughter reverted to her first married name, Lady Chandos, and became owner of the house. Alice was known as the Dowager Countess of Derby until her death.

== Edmund Spencer ==
Alice was a noted patron of the arts, along with her sisters, Anne, Baroness Mounteagle and Elizabeth Spencer, Baroness Hunsdon. Poet Edmund Spenser was a distant relative of hers; in his pastoral poem, Colin Clouts Come Home Againe, he represented her as "Amaryllis", whereas her sisters, Anne and Elizabeth were "Charillis" and "Phyllis", and Alice's husband was "Amyntas". "Amaryllis" was described as "the highest in degree". Spenser also dedicated his The Teares of the Muses to her.

Poet and author John Milton lived close to her Harefield Place residence.

She also acted as a patroness in the political sphere: it was through her influence that Geoffrey Osbaldeston, another distant relative of hers, obtained a judicial post in Ireland.

== Death ==
Alice died on 23 January 1637 and was buried on 28 January in St Mary the Virgin Church, Harefield. A monument dedicated to the memory of Alice and her three daughters was built at St Mary the Virgin, to her own specifications, before her death.

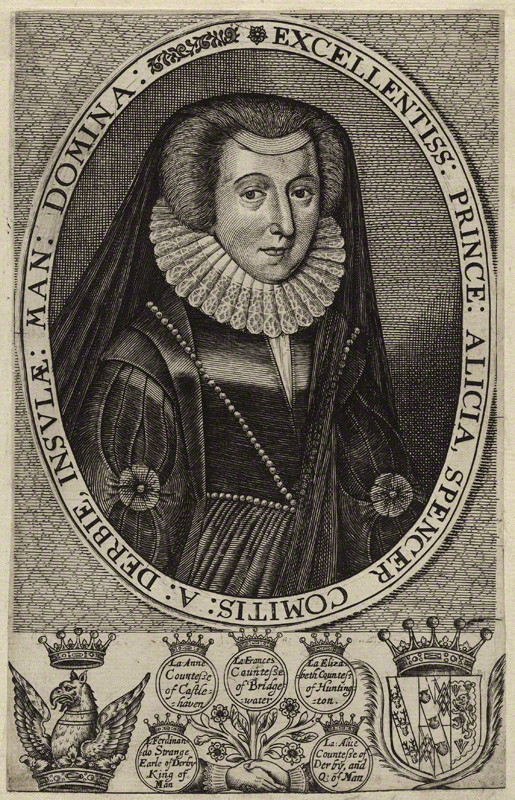
Engraving of Alice Spencer by an unknown artist. It is displayed in the National Portrait Gallery, London

== In art ==
Dr Roy Strong identified Alice as the subject of an engraving displayed at the National Portrait Gallery in London. He has also tentatively identified a portrait by a painter in the circle of Marcus Gheeraerts the Younger to be that of Alice when she was a young woman.
