= Anne Sackville, Countess of Dorset =

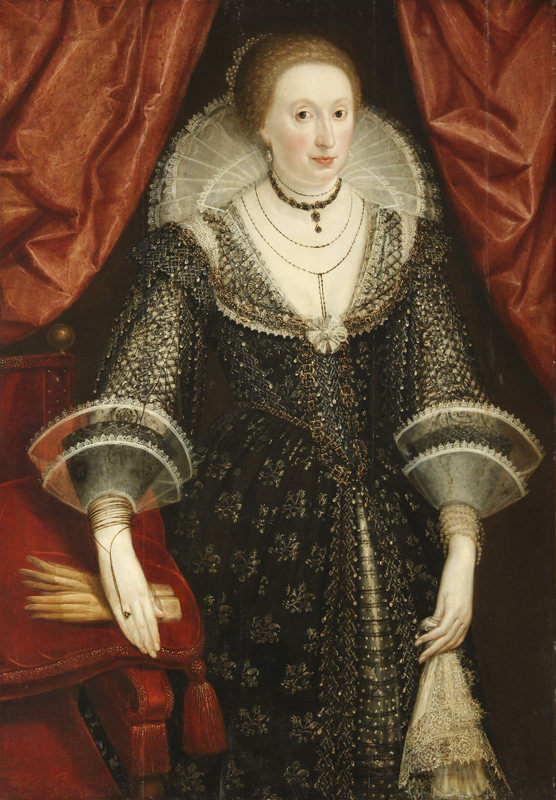
Portrait of Anne Spencer

Anne Sackville, Countess of Dorset (died 22 September 1618), née Anne Spencer, was the second wife of Robert Sackville, 2nd Earl of Dorset. Dorset was her third husband, the first two being William Stanley, 3rd Baron Monteagle, and Henry Compton, 1st Baron Compton, both of whom predeceased her.

She was the daughter of Sir John Spencer of Althorp and his wife, the former Katherine Kitson. She married Lord Monteagle as his second wife in September 1575. They had no children of their own, and he died in 1581.

She married Sir Henry Compton, as his second wife, within a few years of her first husband's death. They had one son, Sir Henry Compton, MP. Anne's second husband died in 1589. A revised version of Edmund Spenser's poem, "Mother Hubberd's Tale", published in 1590, was dedicated to Anne as "the Lady Compton and Mountegle".

Anne married the future earl on 4 December 1592, a year after the death of his first wife, the former Lady Margaret Howard. Whereas his first marriage had been a happy one, he described his second wife in his will as one "whom without great grief and sorrow inconsolable I cannot remember, in regard of her exceeding unkindness and intolerable evil usage towards myself and my late good lord and father deceased".

Dorset complained about his second wife's "misconduct", and was considering a separation from her at the time of his death in 1609. However, Cecily, one of his daughters from his first marriage, married his stepson Henry Compton, by whom she had three children.

In March 1610 Anne, Countess of Dorset, argued and fought with officers sent to administer Lord Compton's estate, and was sent to the Fleet Prison.
