= Edward Stanley, 1st Baron Monteagle =

English nobleman

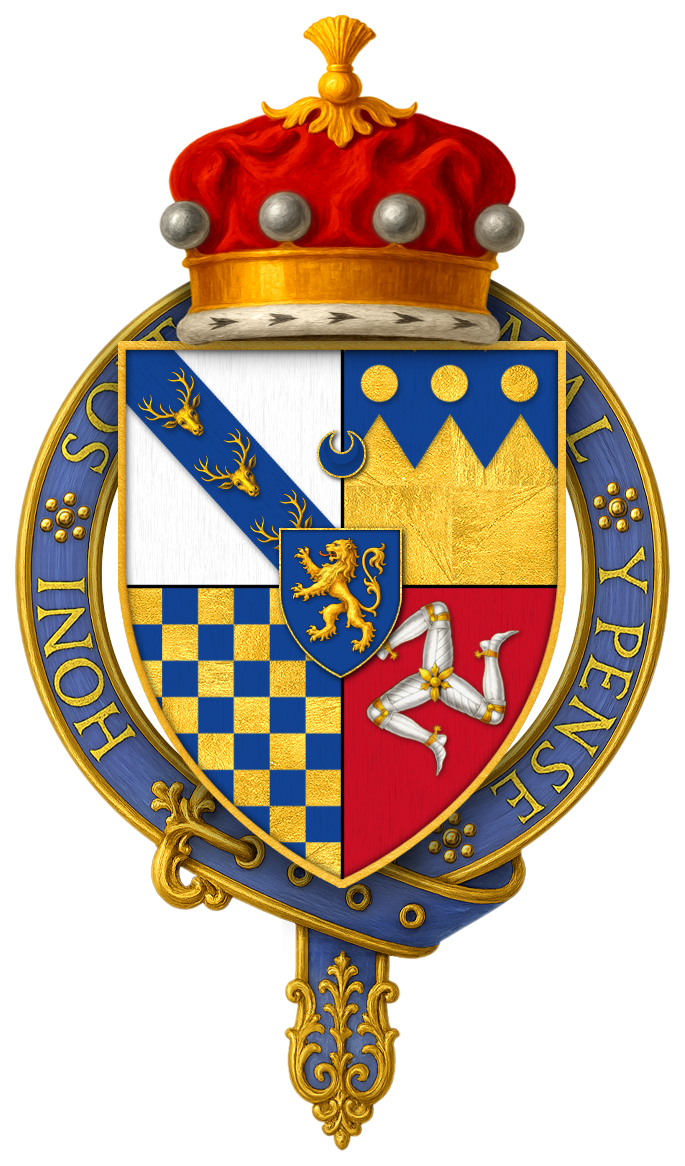
Arms of Sir Edward Stanley, 1st Baron Monteagle, KG

Edward Stanley, 1st Baron Monteagle KG (1460?–1523) was an English soldier who became a peer and Knight of the Garter. He is known for his deeds at the Battle of Flodden.

== Life ==
Born about 1460, he was fifth son of Thomas Stanley, 1st Earl of Derby, by his first wife Eleanor, daughter of Richard Neville, 5th Earl of Salisbury. He was knighted during the reign of Edward IV by Richard, Duke of Gloucester on 24 August 1482 at the capture of Berwick upon Tweed. On 17 April 1483 he was one of the pall-bearers at Edward IV's funeral. His father's marriage with Henry of Richmond's mother and services at the battle of Bosworth gained Henry's favour for the family, when he became King Henry VII.

Edward became High Sheriff of Lancashire for life in the autumn of 1485; on 15 October he was directed to provide against Scottish attacks, and on 1 December he was granted the office of keeper of New Park, Langley; he also became knight of the body to the king. On 4 March 1488–9 he was granted the manors of Farleton in Lonsdale, Farleton in Westmoreland, and Brierley in Yorkshire.

In 1511 he served as commissioner of array in Yorkshire and Westmoreland, and in 1513 was prominent in the battle of Flodden. Edward was paid £4220 for bringing his retinue and their wages during the Flodden campaign. Popular ballads represent the English army as begging the Earl of Surrey to put Stanley in command of the van; Surrey, out of jealousy, placed him in the rear, where nevertheless he distinguished himself, forcing the Scots to evacuate their position of vantage on the hill, and killing James IV of Scotland with his own hand (his name occurs in a line of Walter Scott's Marmion: 'Charge, Chester, charge—on, Stanley, on'). These details receive no confirmation from the official version; but Thomas Ruthall, bishop of Durham, reported that Stanley behaved well, and recommended his elevation to the peerage for his services. On 8 May 1514 he was installed Knight of the Garter.

Six days later he is said to have landed at Calais with Sir Thomas Lovell, and fought the French. On 23 November 1514 he was summoned to the House of Lords as Baron Monteagle. He was present at the Field of the Cloth of Gold in June 1520. He died on 6 April 1523, and was buried at Hornby, Lancashire where the family owned Hornby Castle. There he had set up a religious foundation in commemoration of his success at Flodden.

== Family ==
Monteagle firstly married Anne Harrington, daughter of Sir John Harrington, by whom he had no issue

He married secondly, Elizabeth Vaughan, daughter of Sir Thomas Vaughan of Tretower, Brecknockshire, and widow of John Grey, 8th Baron Grey de Wilton, by whom he had:

- Thomas Stanley, 2nd Baron Monteagle, who succeeded to the peerage and died in 1560
  - William Stanley, 3rd Baron Monteagle, died without male issue in 1581, leaving a daughter Elizabeth who married Edward Parker, 12th Baron Morley, and was the mother of William Parker, who succeeded as 4th Baron Monteagle and 13th Baron Morley.

Thomas Stanley, Bishop of Sodor and Mann during the English Reformation claimed he was Edward's bastard son. He probably died in office in 1568.

Peerage of England
New creation	Baron Monteagle; 1514–1523	Succeeded by Thomas Stanley
