= Baron Monteagle =

Peerage in England and Ireland

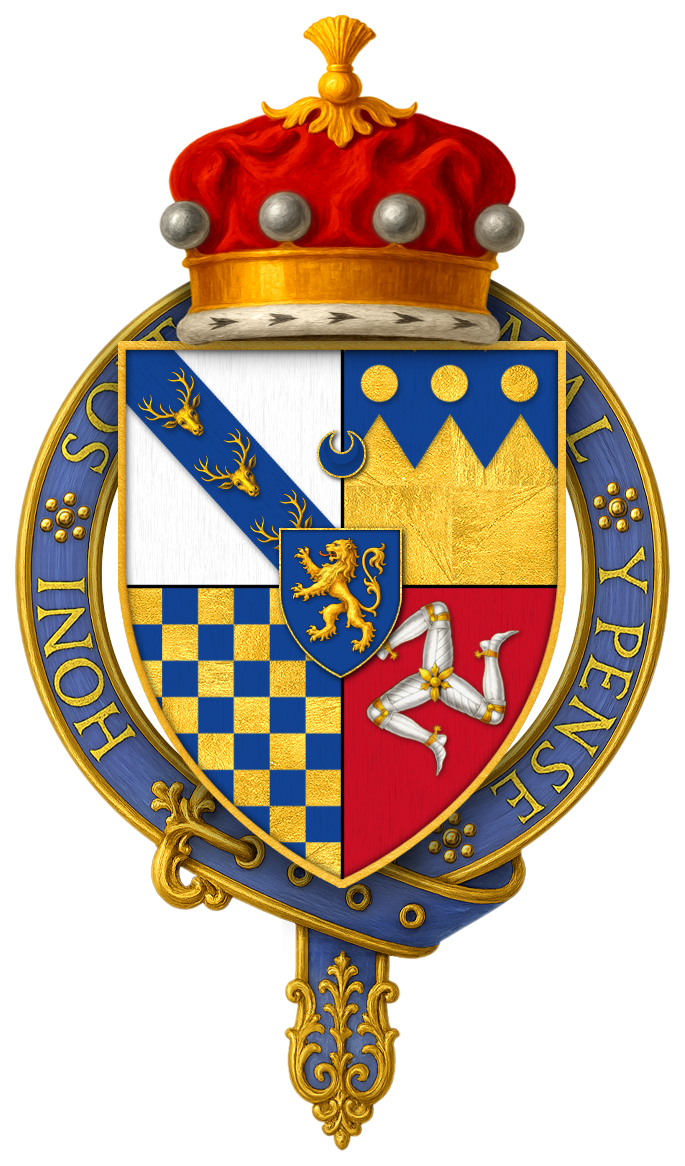
Coat of arms of Sir Edward Stanley, 1st Baron Monteagle, KG

Baron Monteagle or Baron Mount Eagle is a title that has been created three times; in the Peerage of England, in the Peerage of Ireland and in the Peerage of the United Kingdom.

The first creation, in the Peerage of England, was in 1514 when Edward Stanley was summoned to the House of Lords as Lord Monteagle. He was the fifth son of Thomas Stanley, 1st Earl of Derby. The family seat was Hornby Castle, Lancashire. The barony fell into abeyance on the death of the seventh Baron in 1697.

The second creation, in the Peerage of Ireland, was in 1760 when John Browne was made Baron Mount Eagle, of Westport in the County of Mayo. He was later created Earl of Altamont and is the ancestor of the Marquesses of Sligo.

The third creation, in the Peerage of the United Kingdom, was in 1806 when John Browne, 1st Marquess of Sligo, was created Baron Monteagle, of Westport in the County of Mayo.

In 1839 Thomas Spring Rice was made Baron Monteagle of Brandon.

== Barons Monteagle of the first creation ==
- Edward Stanley, 1st Baron Monteagle (d. 1523)
- Thomas Stanley, 2nd Baron Monteagle (1507–1560), who married Lady Mary Brandon
- William Stanley, 3rd Baron Monteagle (1528–1581)
- William Parker, 4th Baron Monteagle (1575–1622)
- Henry Parker, 5th Baron Monteagle (d. 1655)
- Thomas Parker, 6th Baron Monteagle (d. 1697) (abeyant 1697)

== Barons Mount Eagle of the second creation ==
- see the Marquess of Sligo

== Barons Monteagle of the third creation ==
- see the Marquess of Sligo

== See also ==
- Earl of Derby
- Baron Monteagle of Brandon
