= Robert Spencer, 1st Baron Spencer of Wormleighton =

Member of Parliament (1570–1627)

The Right Honourable The Lord Spencer of Wormleighton KG
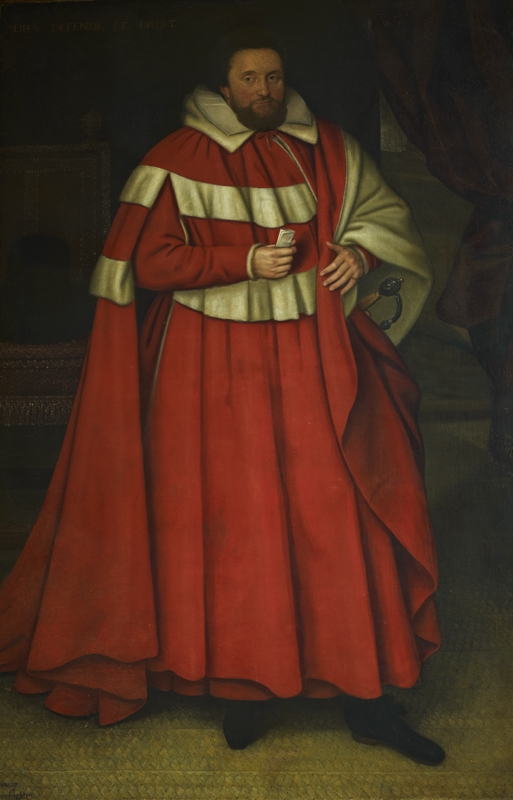
- Robert Spencer, 1st Baron Spencer of Wormleighton
- Born: 1570; Althorp, Northamptonshire
- Died: October 25, 1627 (aged 56–57); Althorp, Northamptonshire
- Spouse: Margaret Willoughby
- Children: 8 (including William Spencer, 2nd Baron Spencer of Wormleighton, Richard Spencer, and Edward Spencer)
- Parent(s): John Spencer; Mary Catlyn

Robert Spencer, 1st Baron Spencer of Wormleighton KG (1570 – 25 October 1627) was an English nobleman, peer, politician, landowner, and MP from the Spencer family.

== Life ==
He was born in Althorp, Northamptonshire, the son of John Spencer and Mary, daughter of Sir Robert Catlyn.

Spencer was Member of Parliament for Brackley from 1597 to 1598. He was the Commissioner for Musters for Northamptonshire in 1600 and Sheriff of Northamptonshire for 1601–02. He was invested as a Knight of the Garter (KG) in 1601.

Anne of Denmark and Prince Henry came to Althorp on Sunday 25 June 1603 from Dingley. Spencer welcomed them with a performance of The Entertainment at Althorp, written by Ben Jonson. When a royal progress to Northamptonshire was planned in 1608, it was said that Robert Spencer went to see his daughter Elizabeth Fane in Kent to avoid hosting the royals.

Robert Spencer was created 1st Baron Spencer of Wormleighton (in the Peerage of England) on 21 July 1603. On 5 August 1607 he was nominated, together with Sir Ralph Winwood, as joint representative of England at The Hague in the negotiations for peace between Spain and the United Netherlands.

== Family ==
On 15 February 1587 he married Margaret Willoughby, the daughter of Sir Francis Willoughby of Wollaton Hall and Elizabeth Lyttelton. Robert had seven children by Margaret.

=== Children ===
1. Sir Henry Spencer (1587-1632) married Lady Joan Church, daughter of Sir William Church
2. Mary Spencer (christened 24 August 1588 – 14 July 1658) married Richard Anderson
3. Elizabeth Spencer (christened 30 November 1589 – 19 November 1618) married George Fane
4. Sir John Spencer (6 December 1590 – 16 August 1610)
5. William Spencer, 2nd Baron Spencer of Wormleighton (christened 4 January 1592 – 19 December 1636) married Lady Penelope Wriothesley
6. Sir Richard Spencer (christened 21 October 1593 – 1 November 1661) married Mary Sandys
7. Sir Edward Spencer (christened 2 March 1594 – 16 February 1655/1656) married Margaret Goldsmith
8. Margaret Spencer (14 August 1597 – 6 December 1613)

Peerage of England
New creation	Baron Spencer of Wormleighton; 1603–1627	Succeeded by William Spencer
