= Dr. Swett's Root Beer =

American root beer brand

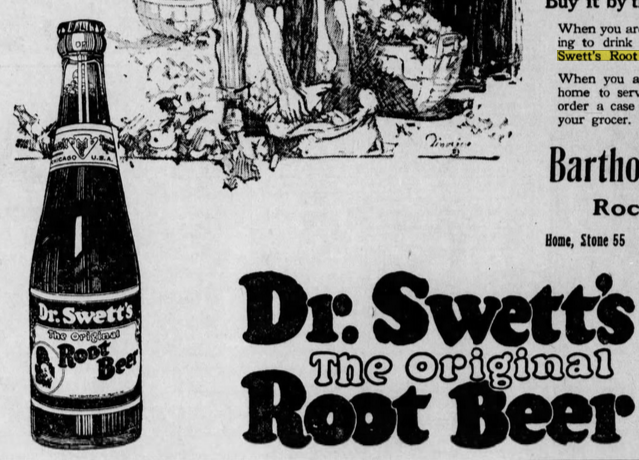
- Type: Soft Drink
- Origin: Boston, Massachusetts, US
- Introduced: 1880's
- Discontinued: 1950's
- Flavor: Root Beer

Dr. Swett's Root Beer was an American brand of root beer that was created in 1845 by Dr. George W. Swett.

== Information ==
Dr. George W. Swett was born in 1834 in New Brunswick, Canada, though he was sometimes listed as being from Massachusetts. Advertisements state that Dr. Swett's Root Beer was at least partially created in 1845, when Swett was 11 years old. Dr. Swett's Root Beer was being sold by 1885 as a type of medicine and beverage. It had begun being marketed in the 1870s. The drink was originally sold in 5 gallon packages at the price of $1.00 and was available in Boston and New York.

By 1890, the beverage was being sold at drugstores, soda fountains, sporting events around the US and began being sold in earthenware bottles by 1893. The beverage had its own dispenser created for it as well. The beverage, which had alcohol in it, was affected by the 1906 Pure Food and Drug Act, which had intended to stop companies from selling fake medicines and required companies to list their ingredients.

The beverage began being sold by the Tri-State Beverage Company in, El Paso, Texas, in 1919. The company opened up a Philadelphia branch in 1920 along with having a Chicago location. The company then opened up a branch in Portland, Maine, in 1921. The company was also selling beverages at local food courts next to other brands like Coca-Cola, Moxie and Whistle Orange at this time.

Swett died on March 12, 1924, in Malden, Middlesex County, Massachusetts. The company was incorporated under the new ownership of George R. Dunham in 1925. The company claimed to have its beverages distributed in Australia, Canada, South America and Alaska in 1921 and were listed as having locations in Boston, Chicago, Philadelphia, Oakland, New Orleans and Montreal in May 1925. The Baker and Malaspina Company of Connecticut was listed as a manufacturer of the beverage in 1932. The company was sold in 1938 to a group of stockholders, including Nelson Rockefeller and its headquarters were moved to New York City. The company claimed that their formula was 100 years old in 1946. The company was then sold to the Corn Products Company and the O-So Grape Company in 1948. The company was floundering by the 1950s with some citing World War II sugar scarcities being a reason and has been cited as being defunct by 1959. By 1990, the trademark for the company had expired.
