= Robert Catlyn =

English judge

Sir Robert Catlyn (died 1574) was an English judge and Chief Justice of the Queen's Bench. He should not be confused with his cousin Richard Catlyn, a politician, who died in 1556.

== Origins and early career ==
The branch of the Catlyn family from which Robert Catlyn was descended was anciently seated at Raunds in Northamptonshire. The Northamptonshire Visitation of 1564 shows that he was the son of Thomas Catlyn of Leicestershire, who was the second son of Thomas Catlyn of Raunds and his wife, an heiress of the Barton family of Hargrave. The Raunds seat remained with the descendants of his uncle Robert Catlyn. He was born at Thrapston in Northamptonshire, and became a member of the Middle Temple, where he was elected reader in autumn, 1547. In October, 1555, he was admitted with six others to the degree of the coif; and on 4 November, in the following year, Philip and Mary appointed him one of their Serjeants.

== Judicial advancement ==
Catlyn was raised to the bench as a judge of the Common Pleas on 10 October 1558, five weeks before the death of Queen Mary; and, like all the other judges, received a new patent the day after the accession of Queen Elizabeth. Previous to the following term, on the removal of the two Catholic chief justices, Catlyn was, on 22 January, promoted to the head of the court of King's Bench, in the place of Sir Edward Saunders. He was then knighted, and continued to preside as chief justice for the next sixteen years, with a high reputation for wisdom and gravity. That he was bold and independent also is apparent from a letter to Lord Burleigh, who had conveyed a message from the queen, complaining of his judgment in a suit in which the Earl of Leicester was a party, wherein he says he "dares not alter the ancient forms of court."

== Trial of the Duke of Norfolk ==
Crown prosecutions seem to have been uncommonly rare during the early years of Elizabeth's reign. While Catlyn was chief justice, only two are mentioned in the "State Trials" and the "Baga de Secretis" adds very few more. The principal one was that of the Duke of Norfolk, in January, 1571, at which all the judges attended. The whole proceedings are minutely detailed from the report, apparently, of "Mr. Thomas Norton, who wrote down the trial on the scaffold," being, it is to be presumed, the "short-hand writer" employed by the crown. The duke being tried by his peers, neither of the chief justices interfered, except when questions of law were raised, which they decided fairly, according to the acknowledged practice of the times. On pronouncing judgment against Robert Hickford, one of the duke's servants, who pleaded guilty, Chief Justice Catlyn made him a long and eloquent speech on the heinousness of treason, thus happily referring to a passage in Chaucer's House of Fame – "As for them that seek fame by Treason, and by procuring the destruction of Princes, where shall sound that fame? Shall the golden Trump of Fame and Good Report, that Chaucer speaketh of? No; but the black Trump of Shame shall blow out their infamy for ever."

== Reputation ==
However high the character of a judge may be, it is not to be expected that those against whom he decides will always join in his praises. In 1566, one Thomas Welsh of London was indicted in the King's Bench for saying, "My Lord Chief Justice Catlyn is incensed against me, I cannot have justice, nor can be heard; for that court now is made a court of conscience," and was fined accordingly. Camden relates that on one occasion the chief justice, having taken exception to a man who had two names, saying "no honest man had a double name, and came in with an alias," was somewhat inapplicably asked, "what exception he could take to Jesus Christ, alias Jesus of Nazareth?"

He was named an Executor in the will of Richard Rich, 1st Baron Rich, together with William Bourne, Sir Gilbert Gerard and Sir William Cordell, but at probate expressly renounced his executorship.

Chief Justice Catlyn died at his seat at Newenham in Bedfordshire towards the end of 1574, when he was succeeded by Sir Christopher Wray.

== Family and descendants ==
He married Ann, the daughter of John Boles of Wallington, Hertfordshire, and relict of John Burgoyne. By her he left an only daughter, Mary, who married first Sir John Spencer, and secondly Sir Robert Fowler. Her son by Sir John Spencer was Robert, who was created Baron Spencer of Wormleighton in 1603, from whom came the Earls of Sunderland and Dukes of Marlborough.

== Sources ==
This article incorporates text from Foss's Judges of England, a publication now in the public domain.
