= Thomas Kitson =

English merchant

Sir Thomas Kitson
- Arms of Kitson: Sable, three fishes hauriant in fess argent a chief or
- Born: 1485; Warton, Carnforth, Lancashire
- Died: 11 September 1540 (aged 54–55)
- Burial place: Hengrave, Suffolk
- Spouses: wife whose name is unknown; Margaret Donnington
- Children: Sir Thomas Kitson; Katherine Kitson; Dorothy Kitson; Frances Kitson; Anne Kitson
- Parent(s): Robert Kitson; Margaret Smythe

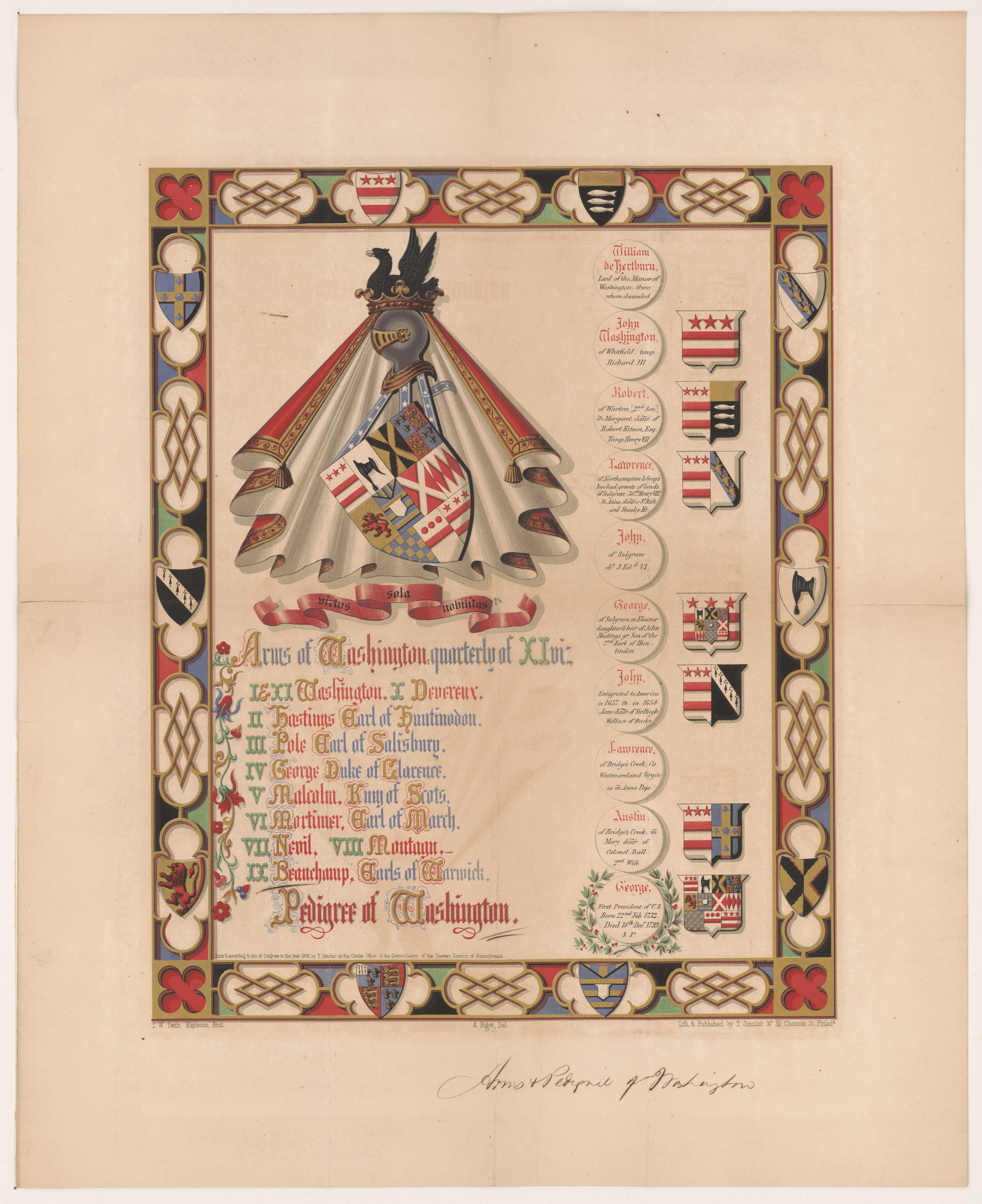
Heraldic pedigree c.1858 of George Washington (a descendant of Sir Thomas Kitson's sister), which shows the arms of Kitson incorrectly, with fish naiant rather than hauriant

Sir Thomas Kitson (1485 – 11 September 1540) was a wealthy English merchant, Sheriff of London, and builder of Hengrave Hall in Suffolk.

== Family ==
Thomas Kitson was the son of Robert Kitson (or Kytson) of Warton, Lancashire and Margaret Smythe. His sister, Margaret Kitson, married John Washington, ancestor of George Washington.

== Career ==
Kitson came to London as a youth, and was apprenticed to the London mercer and Merchant Adventurer, Richard Glasyer. He was admitted a freeman of the Mercers' Company in 1507, and served as Warden in 1525-26 and 1533–34 and as Master in 1534–35. He served as Sheriff of London in 1533–34, and was knighted on 30 May 1533 at the coronation of Anne Boleyn, (an honour not conferred on his co-sheriff, William Forman).

In May 1534, he was associated with Rowland Lee, Bishop of Coventry and Lichfield, in taking oaths of fealty from priests and monks. Kitson had financial dealings with the Crown on a large scale. By 1509, his mercantile transactions were already extensive, and, by 1534-35, only ten other merchants exported cloth in larger quantities.

One of Kitson's apprentices was Sir Rowland Hill, who was Lord Mayor of London in 1549 and is associated with the Geneva Bible's publication.

From 1519, he was a member of the Company of Merchant Adventurers until his death, and traded at the cloth fairs or staples held by the company at Antwerp, Middelburg, and elsewhere in Flanders.

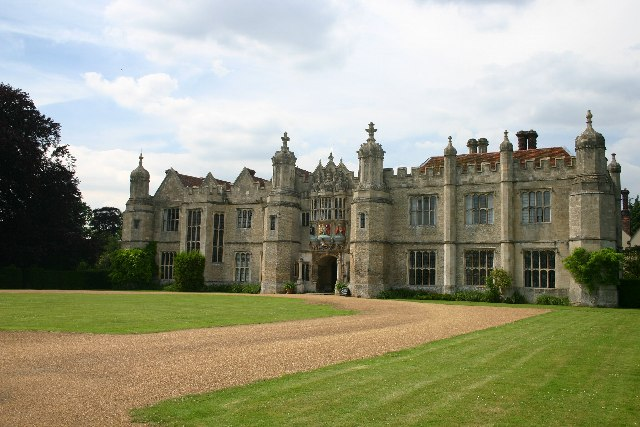
Hengrave Hall, built by Sir Thomas Kitson

Kitson had a house in London on Milk Street with a chapel, a garden on Coleman Street, and a house and chapel in Stoke Newington. Like other wealthy London merchants he had a house in Antwerp. He also purchased properties in the counties of Devon, Dorset and Somerset, and in 1521 acquired from Edward Stafford, 3rd Duke of Buckingham, for £2340, the manors of Hengrave in Suffolk and Colston Bassett in Nottinghamshire.

On the Duke's attainder and execution in the following year, Kitson was for a time deprived of the estates, but they were restored to him, confirmed by an Act of Parliament of 1524. He obtained a licence from Henry VIII to build an embattled manor house at Hengrave on a magnificent scale. The building was begun in 1525, and finished in 1538. A later inventory of the furniture and goods at Hengrave shows its extent and elegance. Kitson subsequently purchased several other manors in Suffolk from the crown. Besides Hengrave, he had houses at Westley and Risby in Suffolk.

== Death ==
Kitson died 11 September 1540, and was buried in Hengrave Church.

In the north-east angle of the chapel is an ornate monument to the memory of his widow, Margaret, Countess of Bath, and her three husbands.

== Marriages and issue ==
Kitson married twice:

=== First marriage ===
First, to an unknown woman by whom he had one daughter:

  - Elizabeth Kytson, the first wife of Edmund Croftes (d. 14 February 1558) of West Stow Hall, Little Saxham, Suffolk, son and heir of Sir John Croftes (d. 28 January 1558), who was in the service of Mary Tudor. Elizabeth Kitson bore Edmund Croftes two sons:
    - Thomas Croftes
    - Henry Croftes

After Elizabeth's death Edmund Croftes remarried to Eleanor Burgh, the daughter of Thomas Burgh, 1st Baron Burgh, by whom he had a son, John Croftes of Wangford, West Suffolk, who died without issue, and two daughters, Margaret and Alice.

=== Second marriage ===
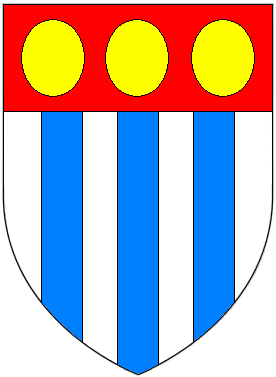
Arms of Donnington: Argent, three pallets azure on a chief gules three bezants.

Secondly, Thomas Kitson married Margaret Donnington (d. 12 January 1561), the only child and sole heiress of John Donnington (d.1544) of Stoke Newington, a member of the Worshipful Company of Salters, by his wife Elizabeth Pye, by whom he had a son born posthumously and four daughters:

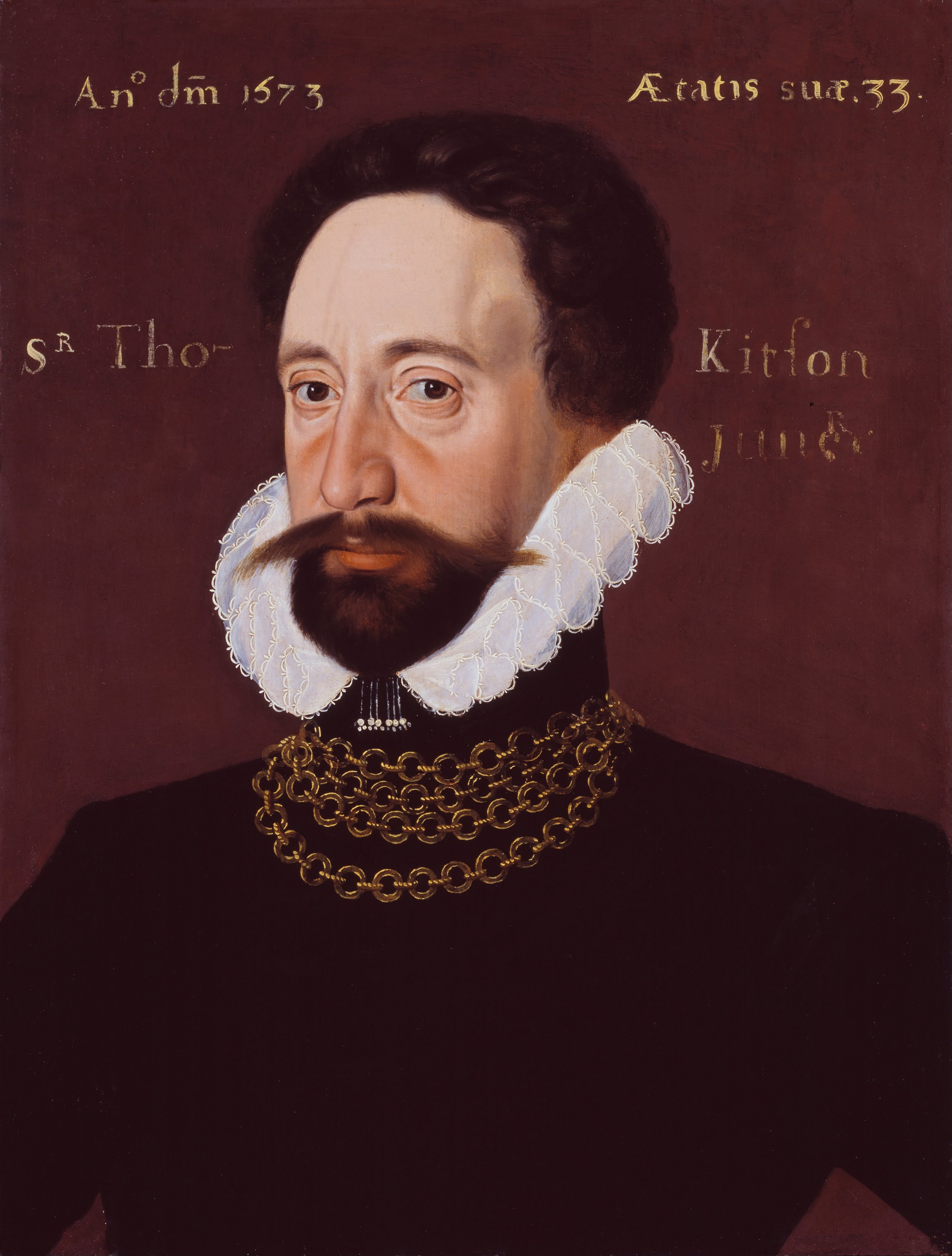
Sir Thomas Kitson, the Younger (1573) by George Gower.

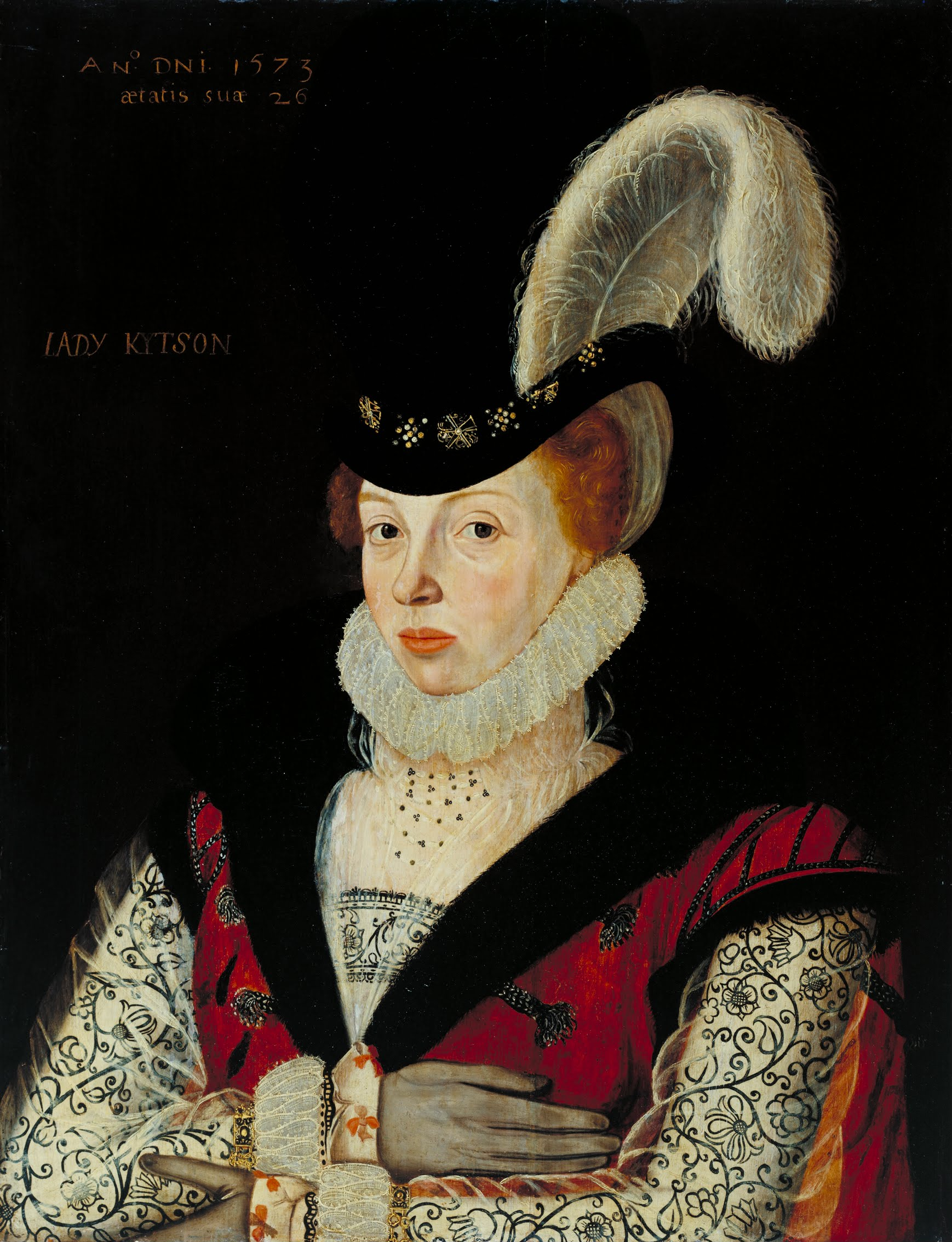
Elizabeth Kitson née Cornwallis, wife of Thomas Kitson, the Younger (1573) by George Gower

  - Sir Thomas Kitson (1540–1603), who married firstly Jane Paget, the daughter of William Paget, 1st Baron Paget, by whom he had no issue, and secondly Elizabeth Cornwallis, the eldest daughter of Sir Thomas Cornwallis (d.1604), by whom he had a son who died as an infant and two daughters, Margaret, who married Sir Charles Cavendish (November 1553 – 4 April 1617) (son of Sir William Cavendish by his wife Bess of Hardwick) by whom she had no issue, and Mary, who married Thomas Darcy, 3rd Baron Darcy of Chiche.
  - Katherine Kitson, who married Sir John Spencer (1524 – 8 November 1586) of Althorp, Northamptonshire, and Wormleighton, Warwickshire, by whom she had four sons and six daughters including:
    - John Spencer, MP, ancestor of the Earls Spencer and the Dukes of Marlborough.
    - Thomas Spencer
    - William Spencer
    - Richard Spencer
    - Elizabeth Spencer, who in 1574 married George Carey, 2nd Baron Hunsdon, eldest son of Queen Elizabeth's cousin, Henry Carey, 1st Baron Hunsdon
    - Anne Spencer, who in 1575 married William Stanley, 3rd Baron Monteagle (c. 1529 – 1581), and in 1592 Robert Sackville, 2nd Earl of Dorset
    - Alice Spencer, who in 1579 married Ferdinando Stanley, 5th Earl of Derby (c. 1559 – 1594). The three Spencer sisters were 'Phyllis, Charillis, and sweet Amaryllis' in the poet Edmund Spenser's Colin Clout’s Come Home Again (1595).
    - Katherine Spencer who married Thomas Leigh (1546 - 1625) of Stoneleigh Abbey, Warwickshire.
  - Dorothy Kitson (1531–1577), who married firstly Sir Thomas Pakington (died 2 June 1571) of Hampton Lovett, Worcestershire, by whom she had four sons, Sir John, Henry, Robert and Thomas, and three daughters, Margaret, Katherine and Mary, and secondly Thomas Tasburgh (c. 1554 – c. 1602) of Hawridge, Buckinghamshire, by whom she had no issue.

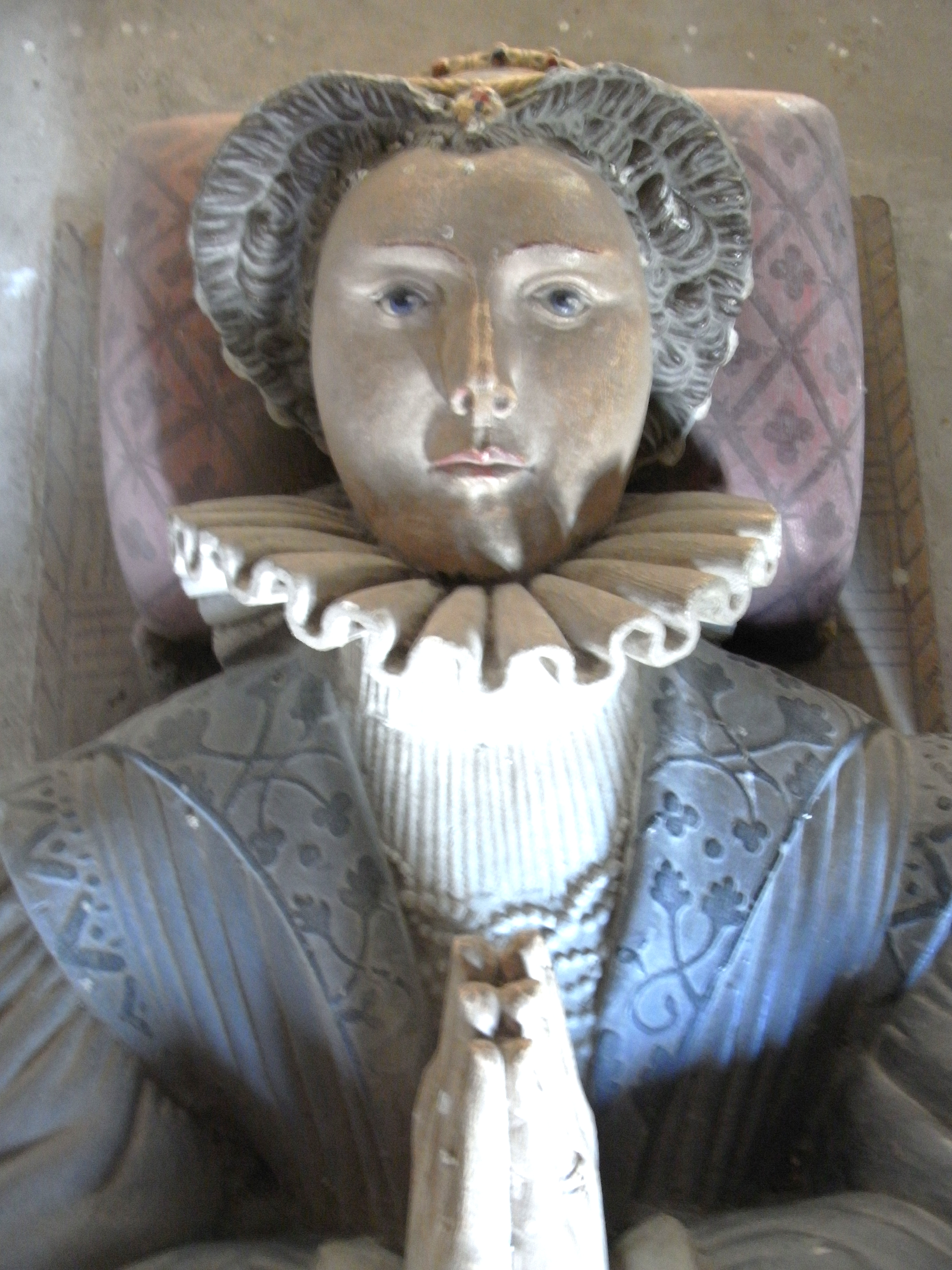
Frances Kitson, wife of John Bourchier, Lord FitzWarin. Detail from her monument in Tawstock Church, Devon

  - Frances Kitson, who married firstly on 11 December 1548 her step-brother John Bourchier, Lord FitzWarin (who predeceased his father), eldest son of John Bourchier, 2nd Earl of Bath, by whom she had a son, William Bourchier, 3rd Earl of Bath, and secondly she married William Barnaby of Great Saxham, Suffolk. Her monument with recumbent effigy exists in the south chancel aisle built by her father-in-law and step-father (Note: Above the external door to the south chancel aisle are displayed the arms of the builder and his wife, 2nd Earl of Bath and Eleanor Manners.) in Tawstock Church, Devon, next to the Bourchier seat of Tawstock Court, and is covered by the earliest six-columned canopy in Devon.
  - Anne Kitson, who married, as his first wife, Sir William Spring of Pakenham, Suffolk.

Following his death, Kitson's widow secured two further advantageous marriages which further enhanced the wealth and prestige of the family.
