= Mother Hubberd's Tale =

English poem

- by Edmund Spenser
- Country: England
- Language: English
- Genre(s): Beast fable, satire

Mother Hubberd's Tale is a poem by English poet Edmund Spenser, written in 1578–1579. The more commonly read version of the poem is a revision of the original, created sometime in 1590, and published in 1591 as a part of Spenser's collection Complaints. Mother Hubberd's Tale was sold separately from the rest of the collection it was published with, though the reason why is debated among scholars. The poem follows the story of a sick, bedridden poet, who has visitors who try to entertain him with stories. The only one the poet finds worthy enough to retell is the tale told by Old Mother Hubberd about an ape and a fox. The poem is allegorical, with overarching themes in search of political reform. The poem was said to have antagonised Lord Burghley, the primary secretary of Elizabeth I, and estranged Spenser from the English court, despite his success in that arena with his previous (and most famous) work, The Faerie Queene.

== Inspiration and publication ==
There is a point of contention between scholars as to where Spenser drew his inspiration from. There is evidence that Spenser could have gotten his inspiration from Geoffrey Chaucer's main work, The Canterbury Tales, as there are several similarities in the templates of the two poems. This connection extends to the subject matter of the tale, which is similar to the beast fable of the "Nun Priest's Tale", but the proliferate nature of beast fables makes this unlikely.

The other likely possibility is that Spenser drew inspiration from Anton Francesco Doni's work, La Moral Filosophia, which is a collection of stories akin to Aesop's Fables. There are several pieces of evidence that suggest that Spenser could have drawn inspiration from La Moral Filosophia, among them the fact that Spenser had used the book in others of his works, notably the Shepherd's Calendar and in the Visions of the World's Vanity, and that there are several traits from Doni's work that have found their way into the fox, ape and the mule of "Mother Hubberd's Tale".

Spenser chose to sell "Mother Hubberd's Tale" separately from the other works in the collection it was from, and scholars have debated the reason for this choice. Some scholars think it is because Spenser was trying to optimize his profits on his works by selling the poems individually rather than as a group. Another theory is that Spenser was worried about the quality of the Tale, and wanted to be able to pull it out if it did not receive a good reaction without removing the entirety of the Complaints at once.

== Biblical references ==
Certain characters within "Mother Hubberd's Tale" attempt to use biblical passages to suit their own needs. The priest uses biblical material in lines 465-466 to try to put emphasis on what he views is the need for those of his calling to wear fine clothing. The phrase he uses, 'Should with vile cloaths approach Gods maieatie,/ whom no uncleannes may approachen nie’ does not directly correlate to the passage he seems to wish to reference. That passage is from the second letter to the Corinthians, in chapter six, verse seventeen: 'Wherefore come out from among them, and be ye separate, saith the Lord, and touch not the unclean thing; and I will receive you.'

== Allegorical elements ==
The baseline allegorical elements in "Mother Hubberd's Tale" can be found in the representation of the animals in the Tale. The animals are representative of public figures of the time period. The fox is widely believed to represent Lord Burghley, though the ape's meaning is comparatively debated. The ape is believed to represent one of three people, and the interpretation varies depending on who is attempting to read into the allegory. The ape has been associated with Jean de Simier, James VI of Scotland, or Sir Robert Cecil. There is evidence connecting the ape to Simier, who reportedly charmed Queen Elizabeth and was said to be nicknamed Elizabeth’s ‘monkey’. Simier was connected to a Catholic French duke, who desired to become Elizabeth’s consort. The proposal would have likely been disapproved of by Spenser.

In lines 615-636, there is a series of allusions to the fact that Elizabeth I gave gold chains to several individuals who participated in the Portugal Expedition of 1589. Most notable of those individuals was Sir Walter Raleigh, who was gifted with a golden chain, along with several of his crewmates, as a reward for their success on the expedition.
