= Complaints (poetry collection) =

1591 poetry collection by Edmund Spenser

Complaints is a poetry collection by Edmund Spenser, published in 1591. It contains nine poems. Its publisher, William Ponsonby, added an introduction of his own.

== The Ruins of Time ==
The poem is narrated by Verulame, female spirit of Verulamium, and praises the late Robert Dudley, 1st Earl of Leicester, though perhaps in an ironic tone.

== The Teares of the Muses ==
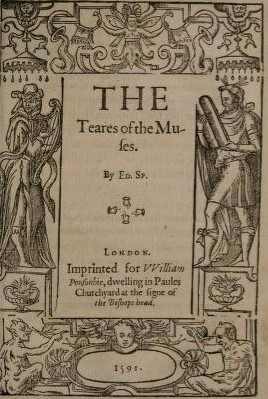
Separate title page for The Teares of the Muses

This poem was dedicated to Alice Spencer, Countess of Derby. It was composed around 1580. We hear from the Muses in order: Clio, Melpomene, Thalia, Euterpe, Terpsichore, Erato, Calliope, Urania, and Polyhymnia. The order is traditional, following a Latin mnemonic poem De musarum inventis, and had been adopted by the earlier English writer Gabriel Harvey in his Smithus.

The poem is concerned with the state of contemporary literature, but also mourns the death of the poet Richard Willes in about 1579. It was suggested by William Warburton in the 18th century that the lines from Shakespeare's A Midsummer Night's Dream on the nine Muses mourning the death/ of Learning, first deceas'd in beggary refer to this poem.

== Virgils Gnat ==
A translation of Culex, an epyllion traditionally attributed to Virgil, it is a beast fable, and was dedicated to Robert Dudley, 1st Earl of Leicester, who had died in 1588.

== Prosopoeia, or Mother Hubberds Tale ==
This work was dedicated to Anne Spencer, Baroness Mounteagle. The 1591 version is a revision of the original. Its inclusion was taken at the time to be the reason Complaints was rapidly banned. The beast fable aspect was understood as an evident allegory of the position at court of Lord Burleigh, in the character of the Fox. Richard Verstegan, the Catholic historian, cited the work in his A Declaration of the True Causes of the Great Troubles (1592), treating it as if factual on Burghley. Other Catholics, Thomas Lodge in his dialogue Catharos, and Sir Thomas Tresham in correspondence, also paid close attention to its content. The Fox has also been read as a credible satire on Adam Loftus, Archbishop of Dublin and Lord Chancellor of Ireland, an ally of Burleigh.

== The Ruines of Rome ==
Based on Les Antiquitez de Rome (1558) by Joachim du Bellay.

== Muiopotmos: or The Fate of the Butterflie ==
Muiopotmos was dedicated to Elizabeth Spencer, Baroness Hunsdon. It is a tightly-structured poem in which the butterfly Clarion is killed by the spider Aragnoll.

== Visions of the Worlds Vanitie ==
• Theme: The fleeting nature of earthly pleasures.

• Summary: This sequence of allegorical visions critiques the pursuit of worldly desires, emphasising the inevitability of death and divine judgment.

• Analysis: The poem reflects Spenser’s Christian humanist worldview, offering a moral critique of materialism and ambition.

== The Visions of Bellay ==
Some of the sonnets in this section, and the final Visions of Petrarch, had earlier versions in A theatre wherein be represented as wel the miseries & calamities that follow the voluptuous worldlings (1569) translated by Spenser (and others) from the original by Jan van der Noot.

== The Visions of Petrarch ==
This work, with the preceding one, is a rewriting of Spenser's first published work, on the theme of Roman liberty and its end. It is not completely clear that authorship lies with Spenser The origins of this poem lay in a version via Clément Marot's French of Standomi un giorno solo a la fenestra, which is canzone 323 by Petrarch. The canzone, in a mixed form as first translated, was then adapted to the sonnet sequence form, with seven sonnets, by the addition of some couplets and other changes. The result is a more rounded "complaint".
