= Colin Clouts Come Home Againe =

1595 poem by Edmund Spenser

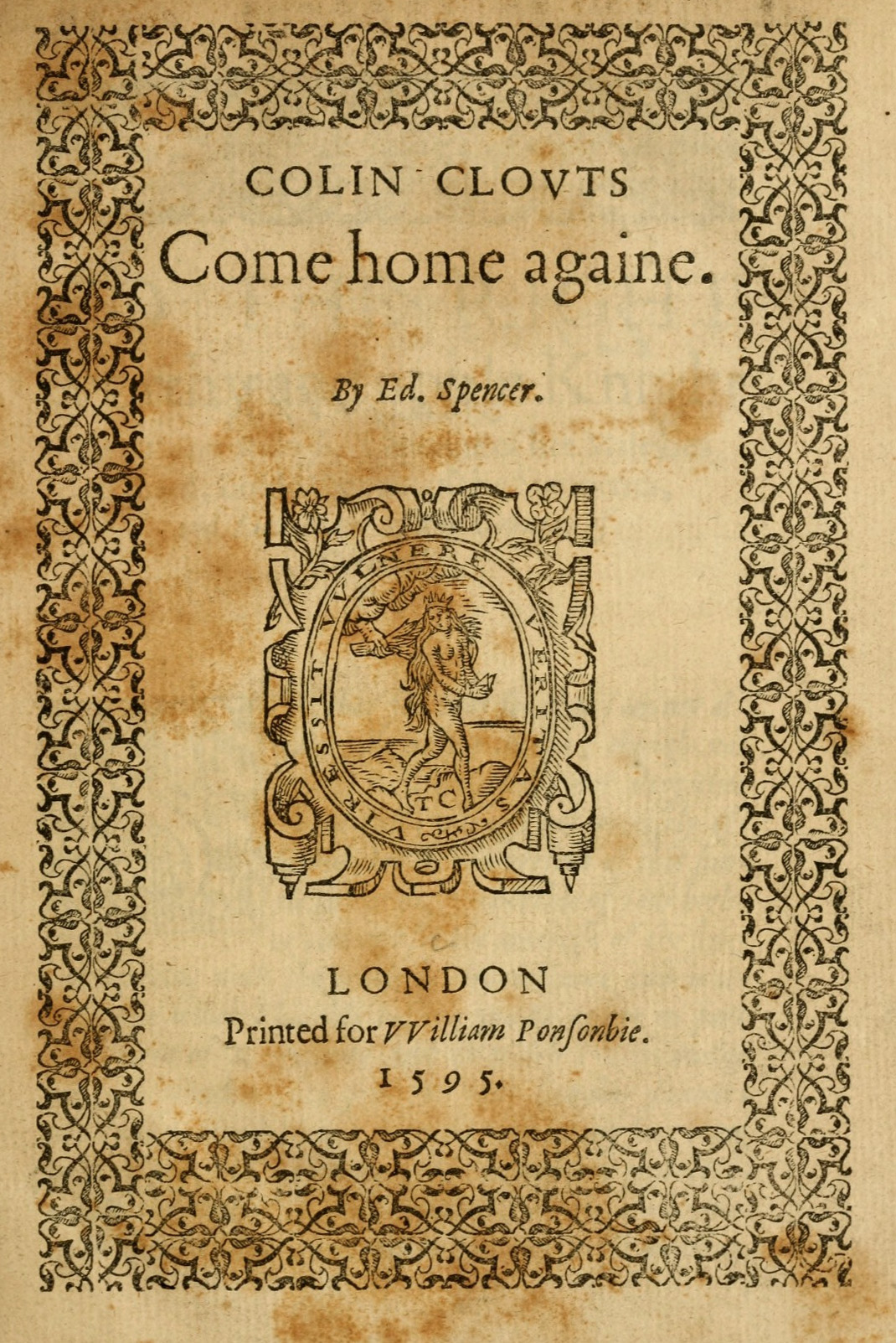
Title page of the first edition of Colin Clouts Come Home Againe (1595)

Colin Clouts Come Home Againe (also known as Colin Clouts Come Home Again) is a pastoral poem by the English poet Edmund Spenser and published in 1595. It has been the focus of little critical attention in comparison with the poet's other works such as The Faerie Queene, yet it has been called the "greatest pastoral eclogue in the English language". In a tradition going back to Petrarch, the pastoral eclogue contains a dialogue between shepherds with a narrative or song as an inset, and which also can conceal allegories of a political or ecclesiastical nature.

Colin Clouts Come Home Againe is an allegorical pastoral based on the subject of Spenser's visit to London in 1591 and is written as a lightly veiled account of the trip. He wrote it after his return home to Ireland later that year. He dedicated the poem to Sir Walter Raleigh in partial payment for the "infinite debt" Spenser felt he owed him. (Sir Walter Raleigh had visited him prior to his London trip, convincing him to go.) Spenser also sent Raleigh several versions of the poem between 1591 and 1595 when the poem was published. In the poem, Colin Clout gives a description of the London visit; the poem is Spenser's most autobiographical and identifies a number of anonymous poets, the real-life identities of whom have been the grist of speculation over time.

Although Colin Clouts Come Home Againe is a pure pastoral poem, the poet, through the use of insets within narrations, is able to mock the limitations of the pastoral mode through poking fun at the use of ordinary words. While he intersperses "grim realities" into the pastoral text, he does so in a georgic (didactic) tone, achieving a rustic effect that is more realistic than the strictly pastoral mode; and then the poem rises to "an exalted vision of cosmic love" in a way that gives the poem a cultivated complexity that was unique to English literature at that time and which became a model for many later poets.

Colin Clout (under the spelling Collyn Clout or Cloute) was previously the character named in the title of a poem by John Skelton, written before 1523. He then turned up again later in John Gay's The Shepherd's Week in 1714.
