= John Spencer (died 1599) =

Member of the Parliament of England

Sir John Spencer
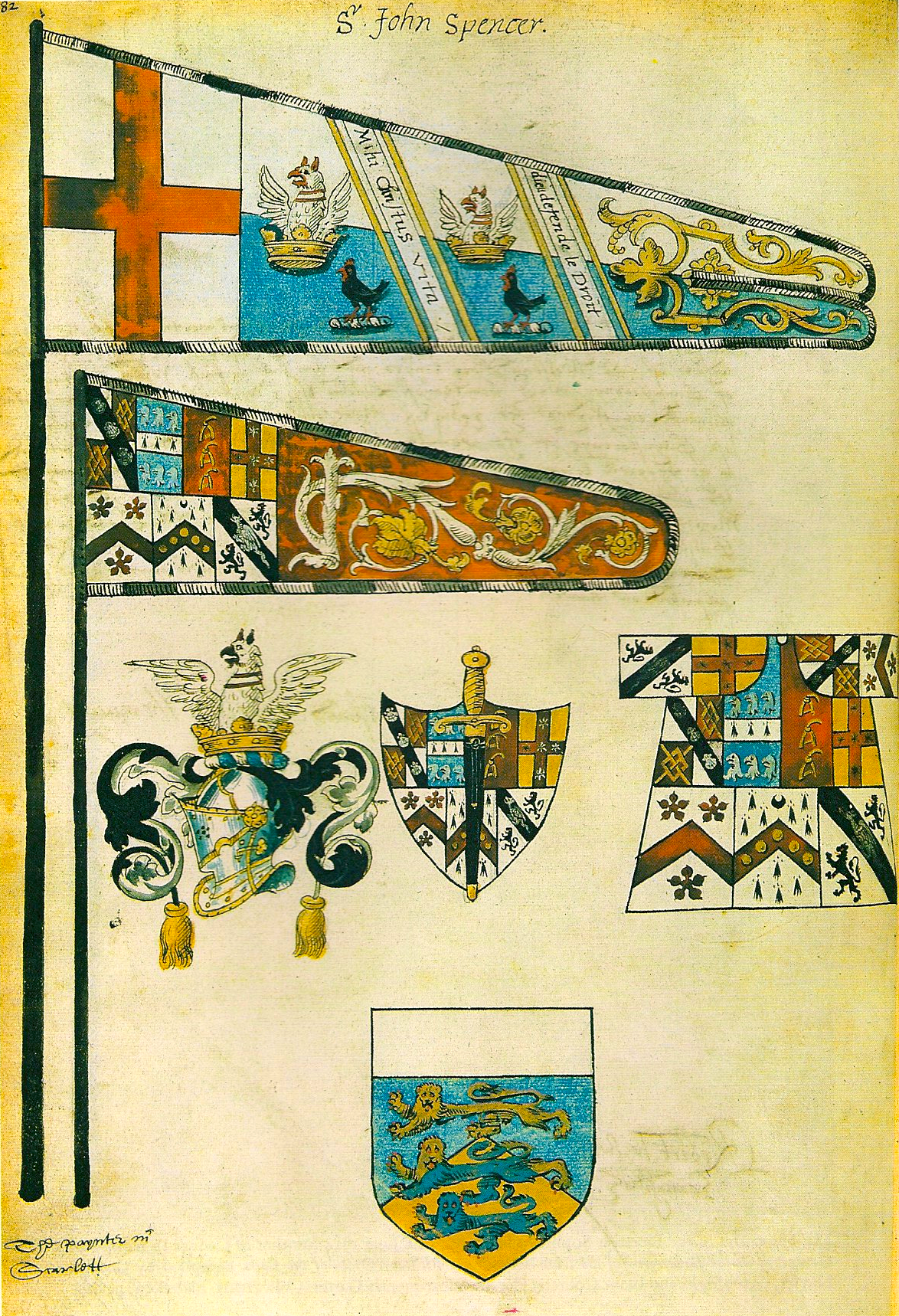
- The funeral honours of Sir John Spencer, Kt. (1551-1599). He displays both the Despencer arms (differenced as a cadet branch) adopted after c. 1595 and the blue and white arms granted in 1504.
- Born: c. 1549; Althorp, Northamptonshire
- Died: 9 January 1599; Althorp, Northamptonshire
- Buried: St Mary the Virgin Church, Great Brington
- Noble family: Spencer
- Spouse: Mary Catlyn
- Issue: Robert Spencer, 1st Baron Spencer of Wormleighton
- Father: John Spencer
- Mother: Katherine Kitson

Sir John Spencer (c. 1551 – 9 January 1599) was an English nobleman, politician, landowner, sheriff, knight, and MP from the Spencer family.

== Life and family ==
Spencer was the son of Sir John Spencer (died 1586) of Althorp, Northamptonshire, and his wife Katherine Kitson, daughter of Sir Thomas Kitson of Hengrave, Suffolk. Educated at Trinity College, Cambridge, he then trained in the law at the Middle Temple. He succeeded his father in 1586, inheriting estates at Wormleighton, Warwickshire, and Althorp, Northamptonshire, and was knighted in 1588.

He was appointed a justice of the peace for Bedfordshire in 1577 and for Northamptonshire in 1584. He was Sheriff of Northamptonshire for the year 1578–79 and again for 1590–91. He was elected as one of the members of parliament for Northampton in 1572.

Spencer died on 9 January 1600 and was buried in St Mary the Virgin Church, Great Brington, the parish church for Althorp.

His monument was made by Joseph Hollemans, a Dutch sculptor residing in Burton-on-Trent.

== Marriage and issue ==
Spencer married Mary Catlyn, the only daughter and heiress of Sir Robert Catlin, who brought him estates in both Leicestershire and Northamptonshire. They had one son, Robert, who became the first Baron Spencer of Wormleighton.
