= William Stanley, 3rd Baron Monteagle =

16th-century English politician

William Stanley, 3rd Baron Monteagle (1528 – 10 November 1581), of Hornby Castle, Lancashire, was an English politician. He was the son of Thomas Stanley, 2nd Baron Monteagle and Lady Mary Brandon, the daughter of Charles Brandon, 1st Duke of Suffolk, by his second wife, Anne Browne.

William Stanley was a Member (MP) of the Parliament of England for Lancashire in 1555. He married firstly, Anne Leyburne, by whom he had one daughter, Elizabeth. Anne was a staunch Catholic with Jesuitical sympathies.

Monteagle's second wife was Anne Spencer, who married a further twice after his death. His daughter and heiress, Elizabeth Stanley, married Edward Parker, 12th Baron Morley, and their son William Parker succeeded him as the 4th Baron Monteagle.

Peerage of England
Preceded by Thomas Stanley	Baron Monteagle; 1560–1581	Succeeded by William Parker
