= Sonnet 154 =

« Sonnet 154
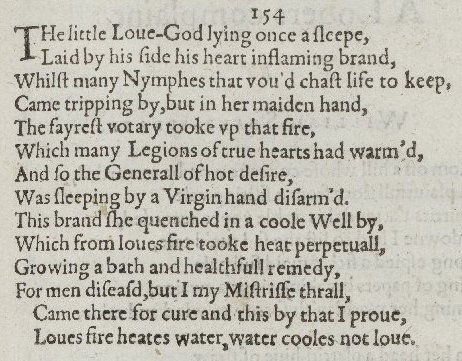
- Sonnet 154 in the 1609 Quarto
Q1
Q2
Q3
C
The little Love-god lying once asleep
Laid by his side his heart-inflaming brand,
Whilst many nymphs that vow’d chaste life to keep
Came tripping by; but in her maiden hand
The fairest votary took up that fire
Which many legions of true hearts had warm’d;
And so the general of hot desire
Was sleeping by a virgin hand disarm’d.
This brand she quenched in a cool well by,
Which from Love’s fire took heat perpetual,
Growing a bath and healthful remedy
For men diseas’d; but I, my mistress’ thrall,
Came there for cure, and this by that I prove,
Love’s fire heats water, water cools not love.
—William Shakespeare
4
8
12
14

As the last in the famed collection of sonnets written by English poet and playwright William Shakespeare from 1592 to 1598, Sonnet 154 is most often thought of in a pair with the previous sonnet, number 153. As A. L. Rowse states in Shakespeare's Sonnets: The Problems Solved, Sonnets 153 and 154 "are not unsuitably placed as a kind of coda to the Dark Lady Sonnets, to which they relate." Rowse calls attention to the fact that Sonnets 153 and 154 "serve quite well to round off the affair Shakespeare had with Emilia, the woman characterized as the Dark Lady, and the section of the Dark Lady sonnets". Shakespeare used Greek mythology to address love and despair in relationships. The material in Sonnets 153 and 154 has been shown to relate to the six-line epigram ascribed to Marianus Scholasticus in the Greek Anthology. The epigram resembles Sonnets 153 and 154, addressing love and the story of Cupid, the torch, and the Nymph's attempt to extinguish the torch.

== Synopsis ==
Mirroring the actions in the first two quatrains of Sonnet 153, Sonnet 154 deals with an unnamed Cupid that Rowse defines as "The little god of love" who is vulnerable in sleep. The conflict arises as a group of "nymphs vowed to chastity" walk by the sleeping Cupid. The second quatrain explains that "The fairest of them took in her hand the fire that had warmed legions of hearts". This causes a conflict because the disarmer is a virgin and has stolen the powerful torch and symbol of love (Shakespeare line 8). The third quatrain introduces an even more devastating conflict as the virgin "quenched this brand in a cool well near by". The plan to destroy the symbol backfires as the well takes "perpetual heat from love's fire, becoming a medicinal bath for men diseased". The couplet resolves these conflicts as Rowse explains, "But I, my mistress' slave, came there for cure". The message is learned with the concluding line that love is a strong force and cannot be conquered: "Love's fire heats water, water cools not love."

== Structure ==
=== Poetic ===
Sonnet 154 is an English or Shakespearean sonnet. The English sonnet has three quatrains, followed by a final rhyming couplet. It follows the typical rhyme scheme of the form ABAB CDCD EFEF GG and is composed in iambic pentameter, a type of poetic metre based on five pairs of metrically weak/strong syllabic positions. The 1st line exemplifies a regular iambic pentameter:

  ×  /  ×   /    ×   /×   /    ×  / 
The little Love-god lying once asleep (154.1)

/ = ictus, a metrically strong syllabic position. × = nonictus.

The 11th line begins with a common metrical variation, an initial reversal:

  / ×   ×  /   ×    /     ×   / × / 
Growing a bath and healthful remedy (154.11)

Lines 2 also has an initial reversal, and line 13 potentially does; line 4 potentially has a mid-line reversal. Line 6 features the rightward movement of the third ictus (resulting in a four-position figure, × × / /, sometimes referred to as a minor ionic):

  ×    / ×  /  ×   ×    /   /      ×   / 
Which many legions of true hearts had warm'd; (154.6)

The first ictus of line 10 might be placed on any of the first three syllables, depending on the shade of meaning intended by the reader.

The meter demands line 9's "quenchèd" be pronounced as two syllables.

=== Rhetorical ===
Although it appears that Sonnet 154 follows traditional Shakespearean sonnet form, Paul Ramsey wrote in The Fickle Glass: A Study of Shakespeare's Sonnets that Sonnet 154 is a rare example of a situation when Shakespeare breaks away from the form he had established in his last 153 sonnets. Ramsey notes some differences in form: Sonnet 154 is one of eleven sonnets where the fifth line does not start a new clause; 154 is one of only six sonnets in which the ninth line does not start a new clause; and 154 is one of three sonnets where the couplet loses its "distinctness" because the thirteenth line does not begin a clause. Ramsey points out that the fifth line begins actions that should not have been stated in the first quatrain, the ninth line continues actions from the second quatrain's conflict, and the thirteenth line continues the actions from the third quatrain and shows no conclusion to the quatrain's conflicts.

Sonnets 153 and 154 are anacreontics, a literary mode dealing with the topics of love, wine, and song, and often associated with youthful hedonism and a sense of carpe diem, in imitation of the Greek poet Anacreon and his epigones. The two anacreontic sonnets are also most likely homages to Edmund Spenser. Spenser's Amoretti and Epithalamion have a three-part structure: a sonnet sequence of 89 sonnets, a small series of anacreontic verses and a longer epithalamium. Shakespeare imitates Spenser with a sequence of 152 sonnets, two anacreontic sonnets and a long complaint.

== Context ==
Sonnet 153 and 154 are used as a statement to address the conflict within the love triangle. The Dark Lady is the object of desire from sonnet 127 to 152. The sonnets revolve around the love triangle between the poet and the Dark Lady who is in love with the young man. The young man maybe pursued by the poet also. According to Levin, there is a connection between these Dark Lady sonnets to sonnets 153 and 154 by "slight but telling verbal echoes" that are present within both sonnets in addition to sonnet 152 having the "same two rhyme words in the couplet as are found in the couplet 153". These sonnets are confirmed as being part of the Quatro volume which re-enforces Levin's claim.

Sonnets 153 and 154 use Greek mythology to portray the roles that the individuals have within the love triangle. Both sonnets involve Cupid, the god of love, and Diana, the virgin goddess of hunt. In sonnet 153, Cupid falls asleep, a virgin nymph takes the torch from cupid and tries to extinguish the fire but "she only succeeds in turning the water into a boiling fountain". In Sonnet 154, Cupid falls asleep and the torch is taken by the most beautiful nymph who tries to put it out in a nearby well but does not succeed. Drawing from both effects of these actions performed by both nymphs, both sonnets arrive at same conclusion: "Water cannot quench love". In connecting the sonnets to the love triangle, there is a sense of determination in satisfying ones urges for love for the torch is the phallic symbol according to Levin. No matter how hard these three troubled lovers try to satisfy their urges, their need for love grows stronger. Cupid is the god of love and is in the midst of love just as the young man is in the midst of the love triangle between the poet and the Dark Lady. In sonnet 153, a virgin nymph takes the torch which corresponds to the young man getting engaged to the virgin which "briefly interrupts the cycle of passion and betrayals in the love triangle that the sonnet cycle has traced". The torch still turns the fountain into a boiling fountain and for Levin this portrays the young man's drive to "heat the desire of others". The love triangle will be severed for a certain time and will form again due to the young man's sexual tendencies. In sonnet 154, the most beautiful nymph takes the torch and tries to extinguish the torch in the well and also fails. In sonnet 154, The beautiful nymph is the virgin that will now marry the young man for now "seeing that she can have for herself "that fire" (154.5) that previously she had to share with "many Legions of true hearts" (154.6), seizes "advantage" (153.2) by picking up the young man's brand and quenching it in "the could vallie-fountain of that ground"—that is, in her virgin vagina”. There is still a small possibility that the young man will commit adultery but Levin states that this is also related to Hymen, the God of love. The act of setting the torch in the well indicates that the young man will settle with virgins propositions that is "suggested by her vow, which was to "keep" not maidenhood but "chast life" (154.3)".

Levin describes the stages of the young man and his dissociation from the love triangle. As the young man departs, the poet will have a chance to rekindle his love with the Dark Lady:"the fair young man is fulfilled in his marriage, creating the possibility, however remote, that the speaker, in the absence of his young rival, will be granted restorative sexual relations with the mistress". The question of who is being loved by whom within the love triangle is quite controversial. Levin states that the young man and the poet are competing for the Dark Lady's affection. Sauer, on the other hand, claims that there is a connection between the love of the Dark lady for the young man and the love of the poet for the Dark Lady and the young man. Sonnet 154 addresses the love that the poet has for this young man in which the young man becomes the Dark Lady's fixture of desire. Sauer states that the Dark Lady may have stolen this young man away from the poet as the " Young Man or Lovely boy becomes the subject of desire for the Dark Lady, too, and the poet feels increasingly alienated as the Dark Lady 'steals' the Fair Young Man from him". Levin on the other hands states that the poet feels that the Dark lady may have run off with the young man and left him with his desire for her that is unfulfilled "for the poet, the Dark Lady becomes the occasion for fiction making: she becomes the emblem of unchecked desire, passion, and frustration, but also a symbol of mystery".

== Analysis ==
Sonnet 154 continues the main themes that were presented in Sonnet 153. In the first quatrain, the man wishes that his beauty be passed onto his heir. The second quatrain asks the question of how beauty can be maintained through time and poetry. Finally, the third ends with the woeful realization that the preservation of happiness is problematic in and of itself. The rhyme scheme within Sonnet 153 and 154 is inconsistent in that the words do not necessarily follow the same sounds. Lines 10 and 12 end with the words "perpetual" and "thrall" and lines 13 and 14 end with "prove" and "love." Authors argue that this off-beat rhyme scheme is either meant to further represent the "disappointment and disillusion" (Duncan-Jones) of the character's worry towards his incurable love or sickness or it is only an exaggeration of the overwhelming excitement that goes along with being in love. Either way, the placement of these particular words highly contrasts to the simple rhyming of the simpler lines in the beginning of the sonnet. In the form of ababcdcdefefgg, the 10 syllables per 14 lines are organized into three quatrains and within this boundaries of this short piece, Shakespeare emphasizes his common theme of unrequited love for a seemingly unattainable mistress or the "Dark Lady". The difference between Sonnet 154 and Sonnet 153, however, lies in the fact that Sonnet 154 strays away from the Greek six-line epigram in which it was originally derived from. It is thought that Sonnet 154 is merely an extension of the idea that tortured love cannot be extinguished by "water" but only a "mistress' eyes".

The symbol of love as the torch is used as an instrument to fuze with the fountain that engendering a hot spring. The fountain itself is the supposed vagina in which the torch, the well endowed male genitalia, is supposed to be extinguished in but the heat of the fire expands within the fountain as Sauer states that "The torches are clearly phallic symbols, while the well and fountain are vaginal images". The result of the torch being dumped in the fountain goes beyond expected outcome which is the act of being satisfied by limited love. Both sonnets and the narrative leave the reader with a message about the attempt to wear love down within the self for it is useless as the sonnet concludes "Water cannot quench love". Sauer goes on to state that the fire does not go out but grows stronger and spreads just like the tendencies of love: "love itself is a sickness that overtakes reason and action, forcing humans to act (and react) in curious manners. Overall, the universality of love and sexuality are clearly displayed".

Continuing on with the theme of the "Dark Lady", sonnet 154 embodies the struggle that accompanies unrequited love. Critics like Mathias Koch and Eva Sammel agree that the use of the "Dark Lady" serves as the cyclical theme of love realized and love lost. Shakespeare also places the statement that there is a "futility of fighting against sensuality". in the later sonnets 127-154 because when faced with the Dark Lady, one is left with nothing but torture and woe. These also reveal that in the "dark lady" sonnets, the pattern of falling in and out of love does not necessarily occur one after the other. Instead, the love affair between the poet and the "dark lady" only highlights her betrayal against him with other men, including his close friends, as well as the "dependence" on the "dark lady" that eventually leads to "a deep and melancholy madness". The undisclosed ending to the relationship between the poet and the dark lady, however, disrupts the linear order in which this occurs.
