= Kilcolman, County Cork (disambiguation) =

Kilcolman may refer to several places in County Cork, including:

- Kilcolman, County Cork, a townland (near Enniskeane) in the civil parish of Desertserges and the barony of Carbery East
- Kilcolman, a townland (near the Old Head of Kinsale) in the civil parish of Ringrone and the barony of Courceys
- Kilcolman Bog, a nature reserve (near Doneraile)
- Kilcolman Castle, a ruined tower house (near Doneraile)
