= Lodowick Bryskett =

Lodowick Bryskett (1547–1612 ca., fl. 1571–1611) was a poet, translator, diplomat and Irish official. He served as Special Ambassador from England to Tuscany in 1600–01.

== Life ==
He is stated to have been the son of "a natural (born) Italian", who has been identified as Antonio Bruschetto, a merchant of Genoa who settled in Hackney, London, but of his early life nothing definite is known. He was generally believed to have relations in Florence, where he certainly had many correspondents. He matriculated as a pensioner of Trinity College, Cambridge, 27 April 1559, but left the university without proceeding to a degree.

== In Ireland ==
On 7 April 1571, Lord Burghley was informed that Bryskett was temporarily filling the office of clerk of the Privy Council of Ireland under Sir Henry Sidney, the Lord Deputy of Ireland. Before 1572 he had become the intimate friend of Sir Henry Sidney's son, Philip Sidney, and he was young Sidney's companion on a three years' continental tour through Germany, Italy, and Poland (1572–1575).

In 1577, he became clerk of the chancery for the faculties in Ireland, an office in which he was succeeded by Edmund Spenser.

Afterward (1582), he received from Sidney's successor, Arthur Grey, 14th Baron Grey de Wilton, the appointment of secretary of the council of the Lord President of Munster. About the same time, he made the acquaintance of the poet Spenser, Lord Grey's secretary, and Spenser relieved the tedium of official life by teaching his new friend Greek. Bryskett remained in Munster for many years. His estates suffered serious losses during the Munster rebellion of 1598 and he left Ireland for a time to pursue a diplomatic career, but returned sometime after 1602.

In 1594, he sought to be reappointed clerk of the Irish Privy Council, but failing to obtain that post he was granted the "clerkship of the casualties" in the following year, and was High Sheriff of Wexford 1595–96. He owned an estate at Macmine, near Enniscorthy, which he bought around 1581, and which he described as "pleasant and fertile". He had a reputation as an efficient administrator, although he delegated much of the work to his subordinates.

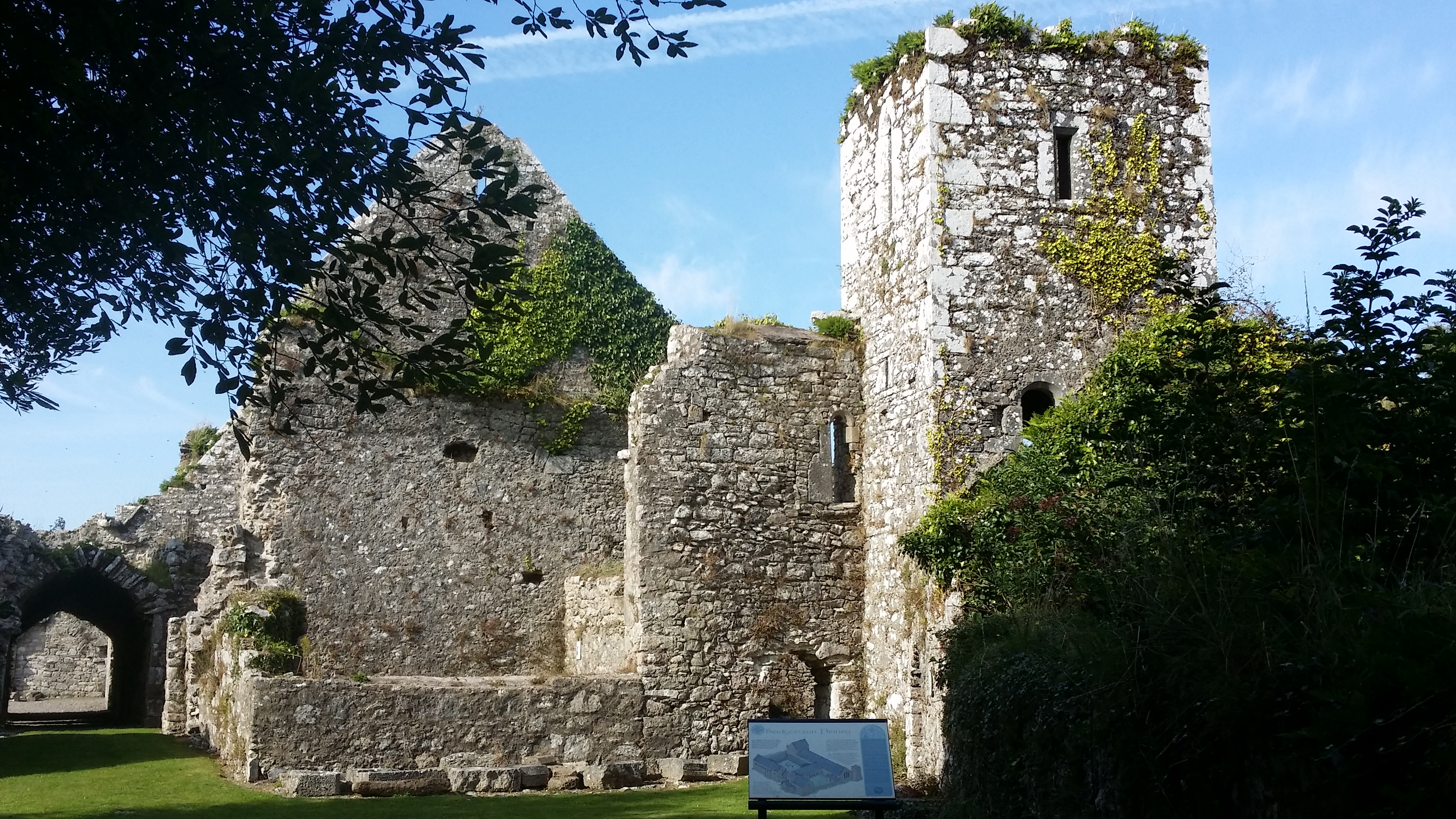
Bridgetown Abbey, Castletownroche, County Cork, which Bryskett acquired in 1595

== Diplomat ==
In 1600, Sir Robert Cecil wrote to Sir George Carew on his behalf, and described him as "an ancient servitor of the realm of Ireland, and now employed by her majesty beyond the seas". This was clearly a reference to his appointment as the first English Special Ambassador to Ferdinando I, Grand Duke of Tuscany, a position he held from 1600 to 1601. In that capacity, he was imprisoned in Flanders in 1601–2.

== Family ==
He had an interest in Bridgetown Abbey, Castletownroche, County Cork, which Cecil asked Carew to secure to him. It was granted to him in 1595 for a term of 50 years. In 1606, he was reputed to hold large estates in County Dublin, County Cavan, and County Cork, as well as Macmine, his main residence in County Wexford.

He married Ellen Fox and had two children: a son, Anthony, and a daughter. He is stated to have been still alive in 1611, but probably died the following year, as his widow soon afterwards brought a lawsuit concerning trespass by a neighbour's cattle, which had strayed onto the Bryskett lands at Macmine and damaged the crops. His son Anthony (died 1646) emigrated to the West Indies, settled in Montserrat, and became the first Governor of the colony.

== Literary friendship ==
Bryskett is more interesting as the friend of Sidney and Spenser than as an Irish official. His chief original literary work was a translation from the Italian of Baptista Giraldo's philosophical treatise, which he entitled A Discourse of Civill Life, containing the Ethike Part of Morall Philosophie. It was not published till 1606, but was certainly written full twenty years earlier. (There are two editions, both dated 1606—one printed for W. Aspley and the other for E. Blount.) The book is dedicated to Lord Grey, and opens with an Introduction which is of unique interest in English literature.

Bryskett describes how a party of friends met at his cottage near Dublin in the late 1580s, among whom were Dr. John Longe, archbishop of Armagh, Captain Christopher Carleill (a stepson of Sir Francis Walsingham), Sir Thomas Norris, Captain Warham St Leger, and Mr. Edmund Spenser, "once your lordship's secretary". In the course of conversation Bryskett says that he is envious of "the happiness of the Italians", who have popularised moral philosophy by translating and explaining Plato and Aristotle in their own language. He expresses a wish that English writers would follow the Italian example. Addressing Spenser, Bryskett entreats the poet to turn his great knowledge of philosophy to such account, and as a beginning to give them a philosophical lecture on the spot. Spenser declines to comply with the request on the ground that he had already undertaken The Faerie Queene, "a work tending to the same effect"; and, finally, the poet invites Bryskett to read to the company his own translation of Giraldo, which Bryskett willingly consents to do. Bryskett includes in the published work a few remarks made by Spenser in the course of the reading on various philosophical problems discussed in the book.

Soon after Sidney's death, in 1586, Spenser collected a series of elegies under the title of Astrophel. To this collection, which was published with Colin Clouts Come Home Againe in 1595, Bryskett contributed two elegies. One of his poems is entitled "A Pastorall Æclogue", and is signed with his initials; the other is called "The Mourning Muse of Thestylis". These two pieces were entered in the Stationers' Register as "The Mourning Muses of Lod. Bryskett upon the deathe of the most noble sir Philip Sydney, knight", and licensed to the printer, John Wolfe, on 22 August 1587. But they do not appear to have been published separately. In Spenser's collected sonnets, Amoretti and Epithalamion (1595), the one numbered 33 is addressed to Bryskett. Spenser here apologises to his friend for his delay in completing the Faerie Queene.

== Works ==
- 1595 A Pastorall Aeglogue upon the Death of Sir Phillip Sidney Knight, &c.
- 1595 The Mourning Muse of Thestylis
- 1606 A Discourse of Civill Life
- Literary works, ed. J. H. P. Pafford. 1972.

== Sources ==
- Sir Robert Cecil's Letters (Camd. Soc.), 160 and note
- Fox Bourne's Life of Sir Philip Sidney
- Todd's Spenser
- Ritson's English Poets: Spencer's Works (ed. Grosart), 1882
- Cole MS. Athenæ Cantab.
- Cal. Irish State Papers
- The Life and Correspondence of Lodowick Bryskett. Archived from the original on 4 March 2016 – via Questia.
- The Spenser Encyclopedia by Albert C. Hamilton
- "Lodowick Bryskett" Dictionary of Literary Biography
