= Astrophel =

Astrophel may refer to:

- Astrophel and Stella, a poem by Philip Sidney
- Astrophel (Edmund Spenser), a poem by Edmund Spenser
