= Prothalamion =

Poem by Edmund Spenser

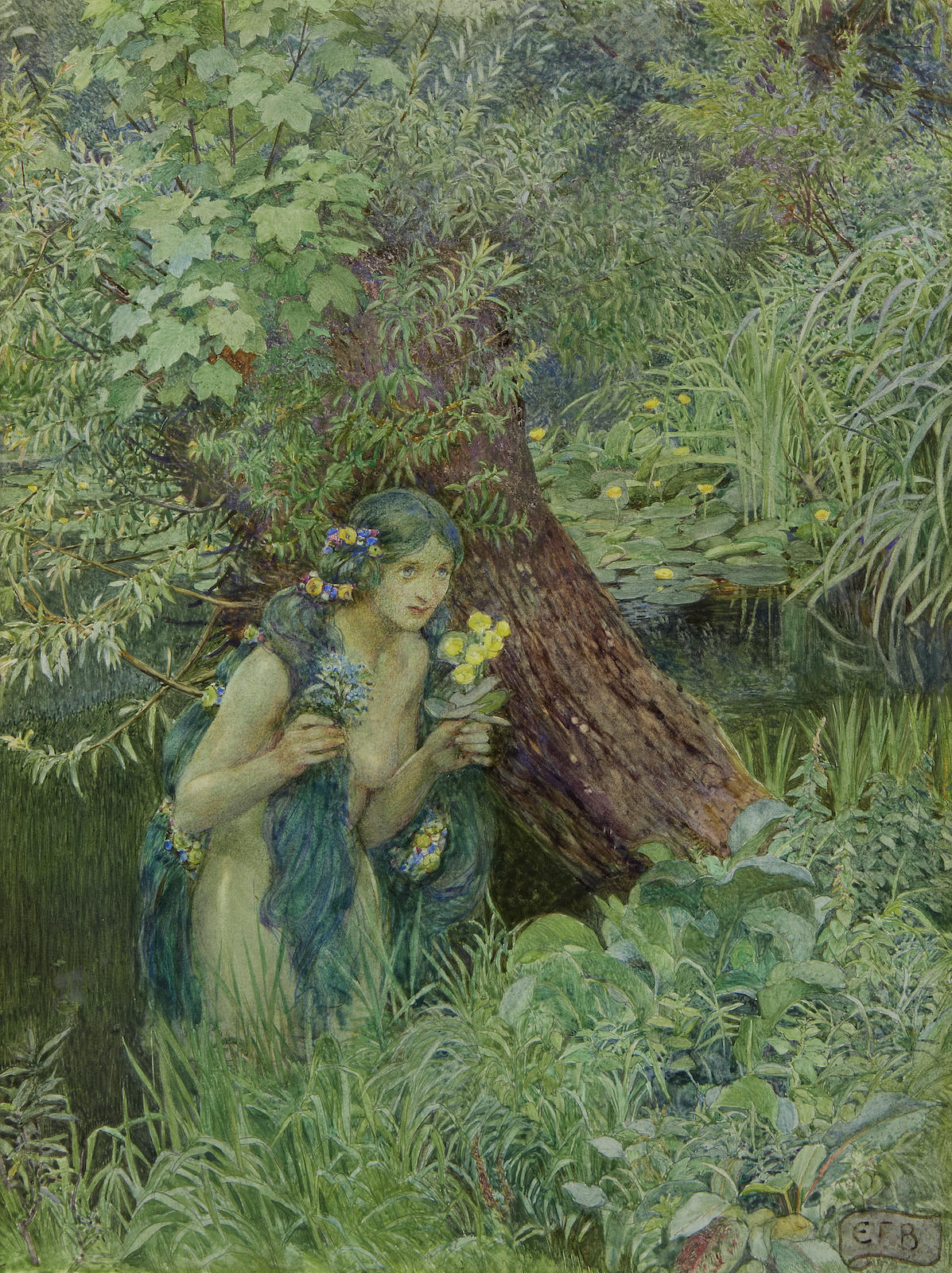
Illustration by Eleanor Fortescue-Brickdale

Prothalamion, the commonly used name of Prothalamion; or, A Spousall Verse in Honour of the Double Marriage of Ladie Elizabeth and Ladie Katherine Somerset, is a poem by Edmund Spenser (1552–1599), one of the important poets of the Tudor period in England. Published in 1596, it is a nuptial song that he composed that year on the occasion of the twin marriage of the daughters of Edward Somerset, 4th Earl of Worcester, Elizabeth Somerset and Katherine Somerset, to Sir Henry Guildford and William Petre, 2nd Baron Petre respectively.

== Meeting the maidens ==
Prothalamion is written in the conventional form of a marriage song. The poem begins with a description of the River Thames where Spenser finds two beautiful maidens. The poet proceeds to praise them and wishing them all the blessings for their marriages. The poem begins with a fine description of the day when on which he is writing the poem:

Calm was the day and through the trembling air
The sweet breathing Zephyrus did softly play.

The poet is standing near the Thames River and finds a group of nymphs with baskets collecting flowers for the new brides. The poet tells us that they are happily making the bridal crowns for Elizabeth and Katherine.

== Depiction of Leda and the Swan myth ==
He goes on his poem describing two swans at the Thames, relating it to the myth of Jove and Leda. According to the myth, Jove falls in love with Leda and comes to court her in the guise of a beautiful swan. The poet feels that the Thames has done justice to his nuptial song by "flowing softly" according to his request: "Sweet Thames run softly till I end my song".

== Connection to the Epithalamion ==
The poem is often grouped with Spenser's poem about his own marriage, the Epithalamion.

== Adaptations ==
American-born British poet T. S. Eliot quotes the line "Sweet Thames, run softly, till I end my song" in his 1922 poem The Waste Land. English composer George Dyson (1883–1964) set words from Prothalamion to music in his 1954 cantata Sweet Thames Run Softly.
