= Kilcolman Castle =

Tower house in County Cork, Ireland

- Caisleán Chill Cholmáin (Irish)
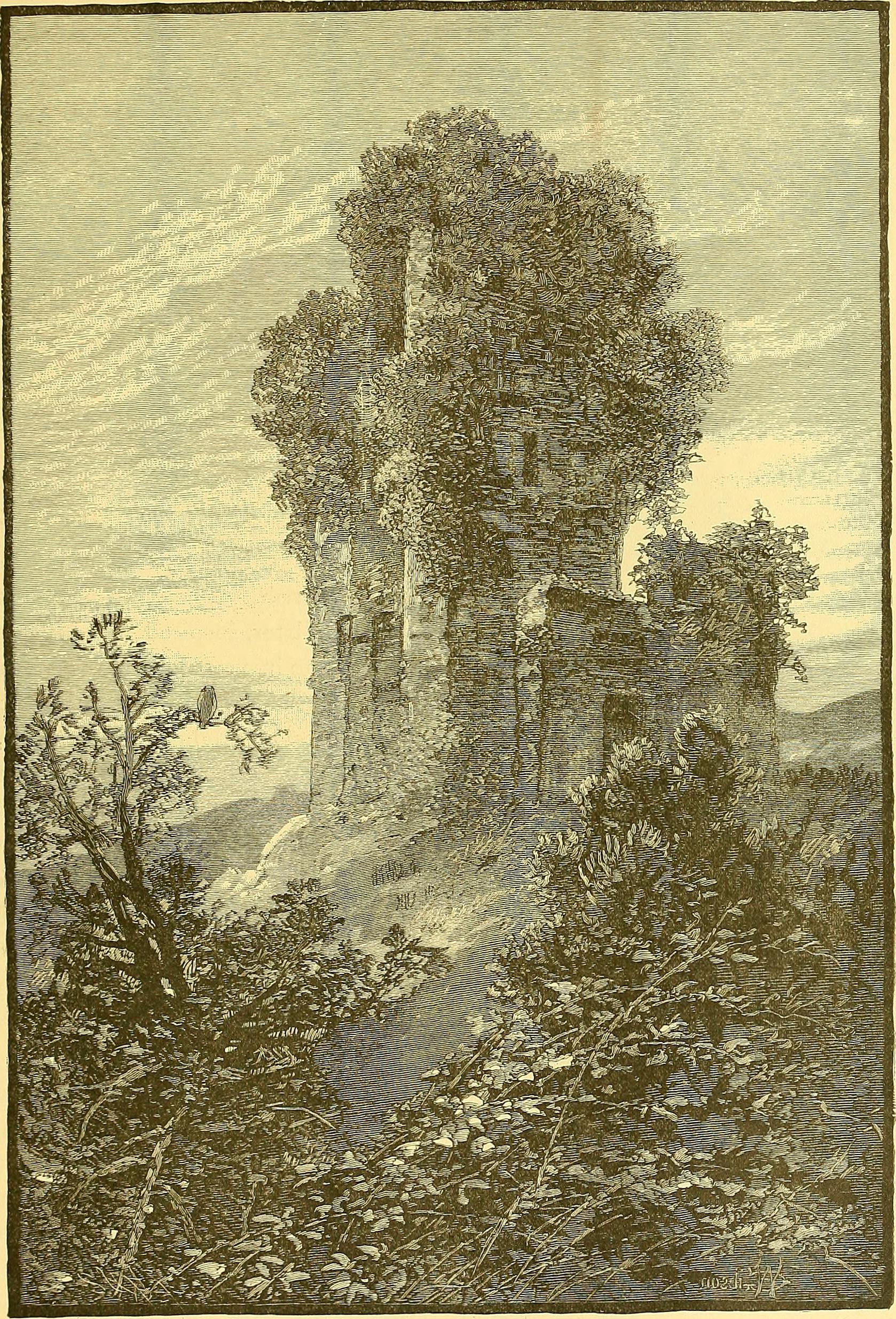
- Illustration of the castle, 1885

- Location within Ireland
- 52.250380°N 8.610485°W
- Type: tower house
- Location: Kilcolman East, Buttevant, County Cork, Ireland

History
- Built: c. 1420s

Site notes
- Owner: Office of Public Works

Kilcolman Castle is a tower house located in County Cork, Ireland. It was formerly the residence of the poet Edmund Spenser.

== Location ==
Kilcolman Castle is located 4.4 km (2.7 mi) east-northeast of Buttevant, on the northeast edge of Kilcolman Bog, near the upper branches of the River Awbeg and south of the Ballyhoura Mountains.

== History ==
This was anciently the site of a ringfort named Cathair Gobhann, "the smith's cathair", belonging to the Uí Rossa tribe of Mogh Ruith.

The castle was built in the 1420s by James FitzGerald, 6th Earl of Desmond, who bought the land from William, Lord Barry around 1418.

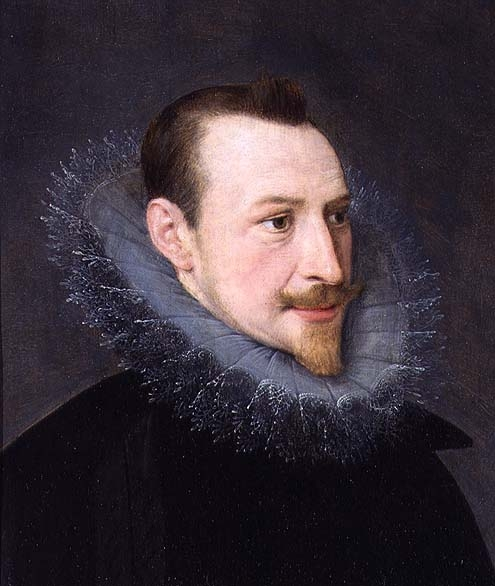
Edmund Spenser (1552/53–1599)

Confiscated by the Crown after the Second Desmond Rebellion (1579–1583), the castle passed to Philip Sidney. He granted it, together with 3,028 acres (12.25 km^{2}) of land, to Edmund Spenser around 1586–1587. He refurbished the castle and lived there for ten years, during which time, he wrote his epic poem The Faerie Queene (published 1590–96), inspired by the Tudor conquest of Ireland and influenced by the wild Munster scenery. He also wrote A View of the Present State of Irelande, Epithalamion, the Amoretti sonnet sequence and Colin Clouts Come Home Againe.

In 1598, during the Nine Years' War, Kilcolman Castle was destroyed by the forces of Hugh O'Neill, Earl of Tyrone. Spenser escaped; his son Sylvanus rebuilt Kilcolman but it was again destroyed in 1622 and, afterwards, abandoned.

== Description ==
It is a typical late mediaeval tower house with a bawn (a curtain wall). It is four storeys tall; on the interior were a basement, parlour, armoury, privy, chapel, study and private rooms.

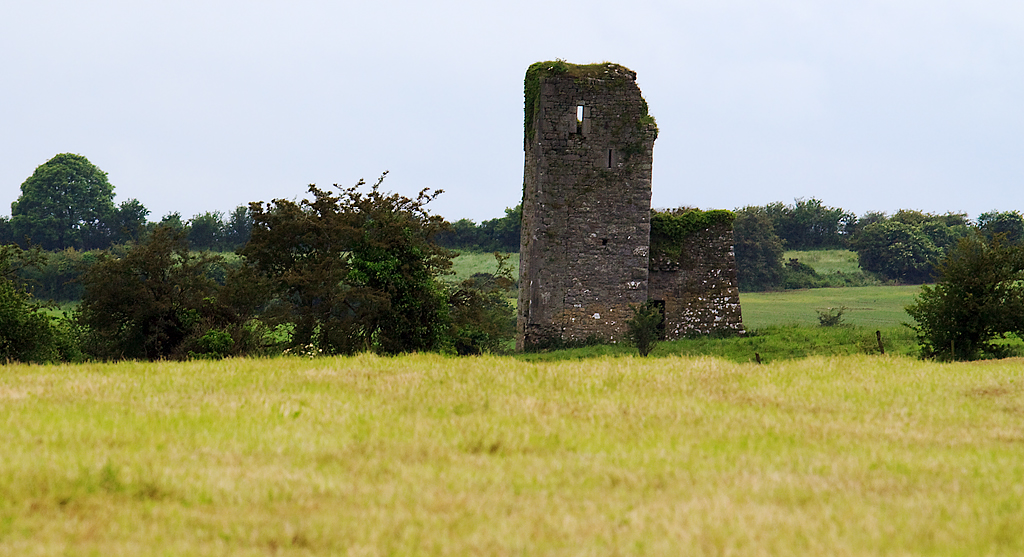
View of the castle ruins
