= A View of the Present State of Irelande =

1596 pamphlet by Edmund Spenser

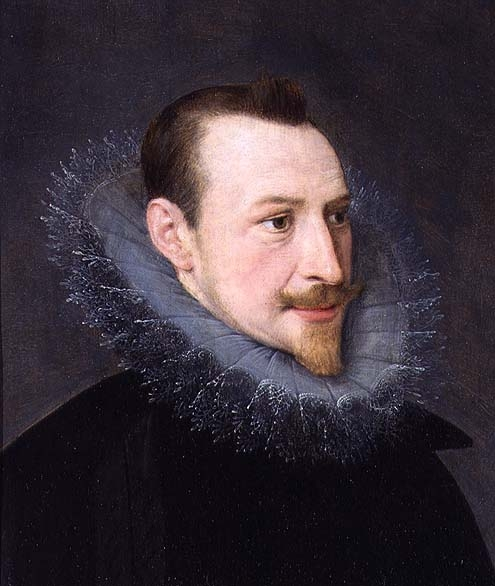
A portrait of Edmund Spenser

A View of the Present State of Irelande is a political pamphlet written in 1596 by English writer, poet and soldier Edmund Spenser. The text is written in the form of a dialogue between two Englishmen, Eudox and Irenius; the former has never been to Ireland, while the latter has recently returned from the island while it was in the midst of the Protestant Tudor conquest of Catholic Ireland. In the text, Spenser argues for employing scorched earth tactics to subdue Irish resistance to the conquest and criticised Ireland's culture, religion, language and legal system. The text was not published during Spenser's lifetime, but posthumously published by James Ware in 1633.

== Background ==
In July 1580, English writer, poet, and soldier Edmund Spenser travelled to Ireland serving under the command of the newly appointed Lord Deputy of Ireland, Lord Grey, to participate in the Tudor conquest of the island. Spenser served under Lord Grey alongside Walter Raleigh at the Siege of Smerwick. When Lord Grey was recalled to England, Spenser stayed on in Ireland, having acquired other official posts and lands in the Munster Plantation. During his time in Ireland, Spenser frequently discussed future plans to establish further control over the island. The Nine Years' War, an Irish rebellion against English rule led by Hugh O'Neill, confirmed in Spenser's eye that England's current approach in Ireland was not working. The work is partly a defence of Lord Grey's actions during his time in Ireland, as the Lord Deputy greatly influenced Spenser's thinking on Ireland.

== Overview ==
The work depicts a dialogue between two Englishmen, Eudox and Irenius. Eudox has never been to Ireland, and expresses a mixture of curiosity and goodwill towards the Irish people. Irenius has recently returned from Ireland while it was in the midst of the Tudor conquest, and advocates for a scorched earth policy to subdue Irish resistance to the conquest:

Out of everye corner of the woode and glenns they came creepinge forth upon theire handes, for theire legges could not beare them; they looked Anatomies [of] death, they spake like ghostes, crying out of theire graves; they did eate of the carrions, happye wheare they could find them, yea, and one another soone after, in soe much as the verye carcasses they spared not to scrape out of theire graves; and if they found a plott of water-cresses or shamrockes, theyr they flocked as to a feast... in a shorte space there were none almost left, and a most populous and plentyfull countrye suddenly lefte voyde of man or beast: yett sure in all that warr, there perished not manye by the sworde, but all by the extreamytie of famine ... they themselves had wrought.

Irenius divides the "evils" of the Irish people into three prominent categories: their laws, customs and religion. According to Irenius, these three elements work together to create the "disruptive and degraded people" which inhabited the island. Irenius focuses on Brehon law, an Irish legal system which had undergone a resurgence from the 13th until 17th century and in many places in Ireland trumped the common law system as instituted by the English Crown. In his view, Brehon law is a backwards custom which contributed the "degradation" of the Irish people. A particular legal punishment which is viewed with distaste by Irenius (and by extension, Spenser) was the Brehon method of punishing murder, which was to impose an éraic (fine) on the murderer's family, insisting that capital punishment is the proper method of punishment. Irenius also warns of the dangers that allowing children in Ireland to be educated in the Irish language would bring: "Soe that the speach being Irish, the hart must needes be Irishe; for out of the aboundance of the hart, the tonge speaketh."

== Publication ==
The pamphlet was not published in his lifetime, possibly because of its inflammatory content. It was published posthumously by Irish historian James Ware in 1633.

== Legacy ==
Ulster-born British writer C. S. Lewis wrote in 1936 that Spenser "was the instrument of a detestable policy in Ireland... the wickedness he had shared in begins to corrupt his imagination."
