= Marianus Scholasticus =

Greek poet of the Roman period

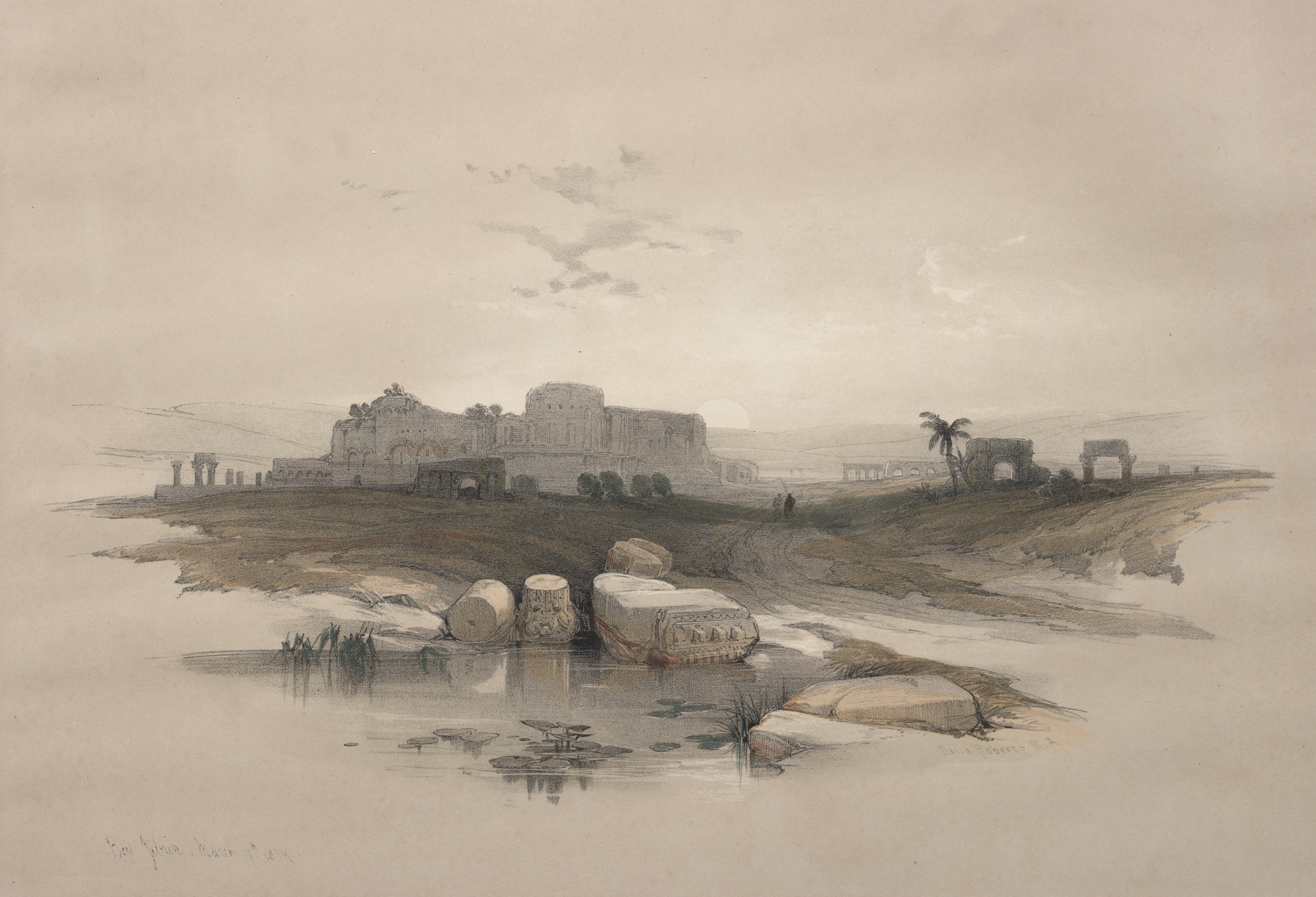
View of Bayt Jibrin, showing the ruins of Eleutheropolis (1839)

Marianus (Greek: Μαριανóς; fl. c. AD 513) was a Greek poet of the Roman period.

Marianus was the son of Marsus, a Roman advocate and procurator who had settled at Eleutheropolis in Palestine. According to the Suda, Marianus flourished in the reign of Anastasius, and wrote paraphrases (παράφρασεις) in iambics of the works of famous Greek poets: the Idylls of Theocritus; the Argonautica of Apollonius; the Hecale, Hymns, Aetia, and Epigrams of Callimachus; the Phenomena of Aratus; and the Theriaca of Nicander, among many others. The historian Evagrius calls him Marinus (Μαρινóς) the Syrian, and states that he held the praetorian prefecture in 513 during the rebellion of Vitalian.

There are also five epigrams from the Cycle of Agathias preserved in the Greek Anthology and ascribed to a Marianus Scholasticus, who may have been the same person. Four of the epigrams are descriptions of the origins and attributes of the groves, baths and statue of Eros in the suburbs of Amaseia in Pontus. It has been suggested that one of these indirectly influenced Shakespeare's last two sonnets.

== Bibliography ==
- Evagrius, Ecclesiastical History. Translated by Edward Walford (London: Samuel Bagster & Sons, 1847)
- Hutton, James. “Analogues of Shakespeare’s Sonnets 153-54: Contributions to the History of a Theme.” Modern Philology 38, no. 4 (1941): 385–403.
- "Marianos", David Whitehead (ed.) Suda On Line: Byzantine Lexicography (6 May 2013)
- "Marianus", William Smith (ed.) Dictionary of Greek and Roman Biography and Mythology. Vol. II (London, 1870)
- The Greek Anthology III (Loeb Classical Library). Translated by W. R. Paton (London: Heinemann, 1916)
