= Astrophel (Edmund Spenser) =

Poem by Edmund Spenser

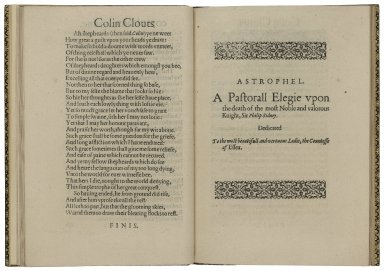
Title page of Astrophel by Edmund Spenser

Astrophel: A Pastorall Elegy upon the Death of the Most Noble and Valorous Knight, Sir Philip Sidney is a poem by the English poet Edmund Spenser. It is Spenser's tribute to the memory of Sir Philip Sidney, who had died in 1586, and was dedicated "To the most beautiful and vertuous Ladie, the Countesse of Essex", Frances Walsingham, Sidney's widow.

== History of writing and publication ==
Astrophel was published in 1595 by William Ponsonby in a volume called Colin Clouts Come Home Againe. It includes other poems besides Spenser's: two elegies, "The Mourning Muse of Thestylis" and "A Pastorall Aeglogue Vpon the Death of Sir Philip Sidney Knight", which are attributed to "L.B.", generally assumed to be Lodowick Bryskett, and which show him to be a more than competent poet; one by Mathew Roydon; an epitaph by Walter Raleigh; the volume concluding with another epitaph by Fulke Greville or Edward Dyer.

The date of when Astrophel was written is unknown. It is assumed to be one of the latest formal elegies on Sidney, composed some time between 1591 (Complaints) and late 1595 (Colin Clout), but nothing in Spenser's Astrophel indicates where it was written. However, given the close links between Spenser's elegies and Bryskett's, a third elegy in the volume, it seems likely that Astrophel was written in Ireland, some time between 1591 and Spenser’s return to London in the winter of 1595–96.

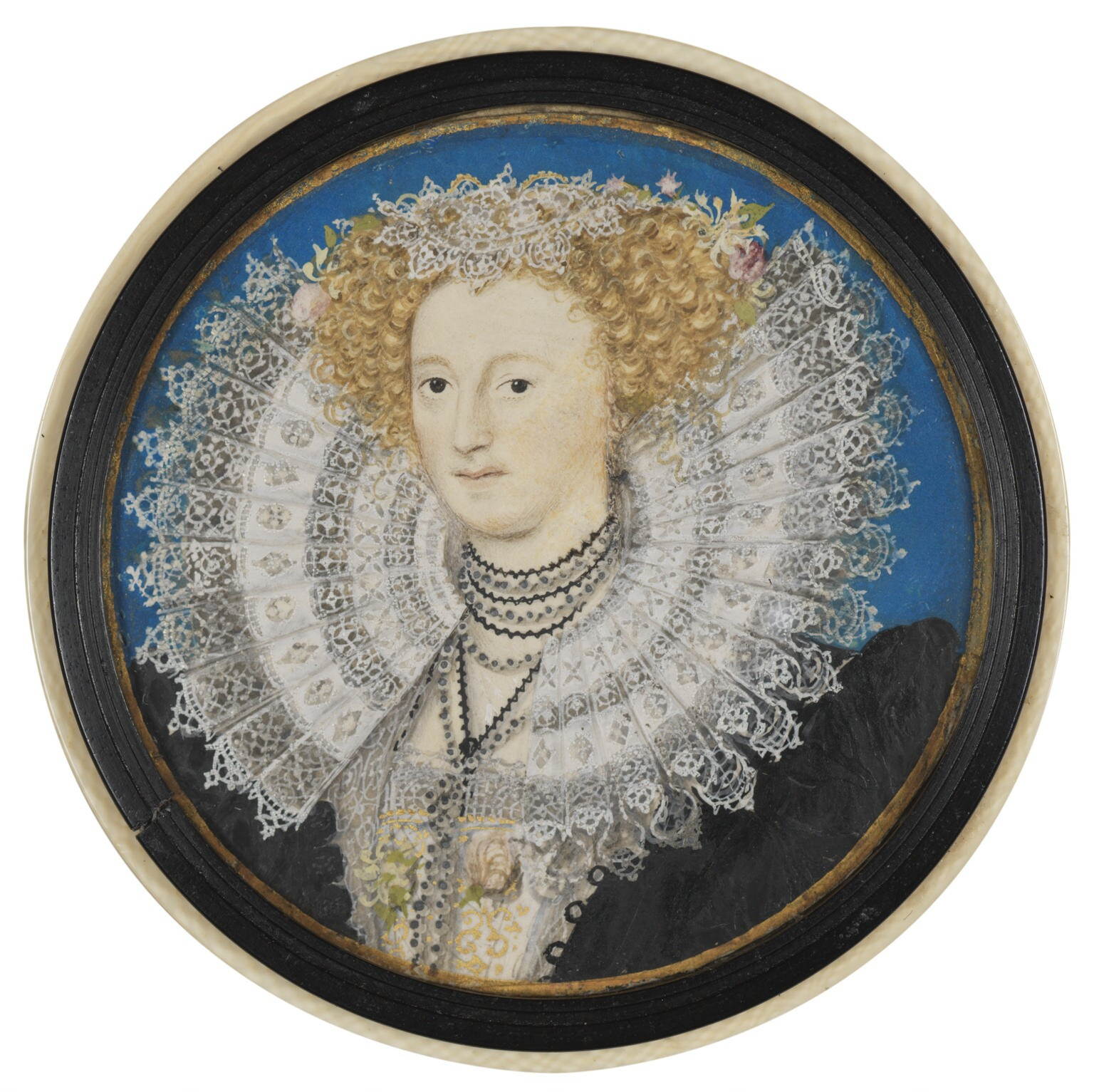
Portrait of Mary Herbert, née Sidney, by Nicholas Hilliard, c. 1590

The exact reason why Spenser delayed in publishing an elegy for Sidney is unknown. However, in his letter to the Countess of Pembroke which prefaces "Ruines of Time" in Complaints, he speaks of the deaths of Sidney and his two uncles, saying that since his arrival in England his friends have upbraided him "for that I have not shewed any thankful remembrance towards him or any of them; but suffer their names to sleep in silence and forgetfulness".

== Sources ==
Astrophel appears as a complex and integrated poem, with a number of European and Classical sources, including Ronsard and Ovid. Perhaps its most significant debt is to Moschus' lament for Bion, enabling Spenser to emphasize his own role as the funeral poet speaking for grieving nation. Though the extreme sensuousness of Ronsard's poem may have made it an inappropriate model for celebrating the heroic Sidney, Spenser's transformation of it is thorough.

The second source of the poem are the actual events leading up to Sidney's death in the Battle of Zutphen. The Netherlands are transformed into "a forest wide and waste"; the Spaniards, who shot him, into "the British nation"; and the Dutch among whom Sidney died into "a sort of shepherds". The period between Sidney's wounding and death is imaged in the ten stanzas between Astrophel's wounding and death.

== Form ==
The poem consists of 3 prefatory stanzas, 33 stanzas of elegy, and 3 describing the grief of Astrophel's fellow shepherds, in sixains rhyming ababcc. The concluding lines prepare the reader for another elegy, "The Dolefull Lay of Clorinda", presumably written by the Countess of Pembroke.

== "The Doleful Lay of Clorinda" controversy ==
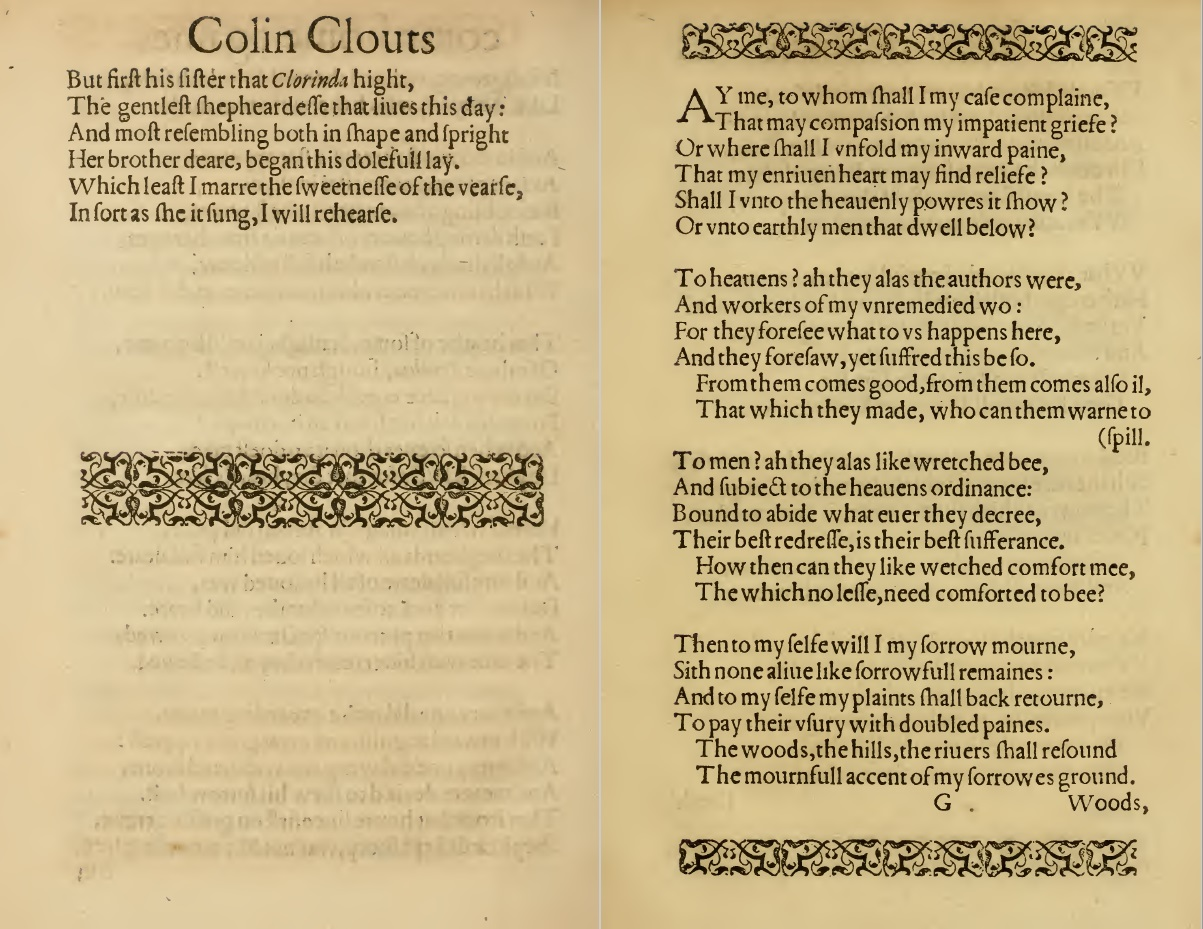
"The Doleful Lay of Clorinda" section of "Astrophel" (1595)

The 1595 edition separates the "Doleful Lay" from the rest of Astrophel without change in title or author but with a page break and borders. In 1855 these lines were attributed to Mary Sidney by footnote. However, stylistic evidence and the close links between the two poems convince some critics to attribute the poem to Spenser.

Evidence of Mary Sidney's authorship includes her 1594 letter to Philip Sidney's friend Sir Edward Wotton, asking for his copy of a poem of mourning that she had written long ago and now needed; Spenser's parallel treatment of Lodowick Bryskett as "Thestylis" and the countess as "Clorinda"; the parallel separation of "Clorinda" from "Astrophel" and from "The Mourning Muse of Thestylis" by the use of borders and introductory stanzas in the first publication of the "Doleful Lay"; Spenser's own references to the countess in Astrophel and in "The Ruines of Time" (1591); and stylistic similarities to the Countess' other works.

== Critics ==
Spenser's work has been criticised for concentrating too heavily on literary conventions to the exclusion of wider contextual issues. Also a broader criticism of Astrophel has been that it is cold and conventional, that the quality of inspiration could not be summoned at the moment, or it was from a lack of material with which to round out an adequate poem. It has also been suggested that the poem is mediocre and lacking the simplicity belonging to the expression of true feeling because Spenser was sincerely mourning Sidney's death. Therefore, Spenser was too emotionally attached to the subject matter to write a good poem (Child 535).

== Editions ==
- 1595 edition of Colin Clouts Come Home Againe containing “Astrophel”
- Spenser Complete Works: 1893 Variorum Edition
- The complete poetical works of Edmund Spenser 1908 ed.

== Sources ==
- Coren, Pamela, "Edmund Spenser, Mary Sidney, and the Doleful Lay". SEL: Studies in English Literature 1500–1900, Vol. 42, 2002.
- Hadfield, Andrew, "Edmund Spenser: A Life". Oxford University Press, 2014.
- Hamilton A.C., "The Spenser encyclopaedia". Routledge, 2006.
- Jones, H.S.V., "A Spenser Handbook " Appleton-century-crofts, inc., 1958.
- O'Connell, Michael. "Astrophel: Spenser's Double Elegy". SEL: Studies in English Literature 1500–1900. Vol. 11, No. 1, The English Renaissance.1971.
- Maley, Willy. “Spenser's Life.” The Oxford Dictionary of Edmund Spenser. Richard A. McCabe ed. 1st Ed. 2010.
- McCabe, Richard A. A Critical Companion to Spenser Studies. Edited by Bart van Es. Palgrave MacMillan, 2006.
- Spenser, Edmund. "The Poetical Works of Edmund Spenser". Child, Francis ed. vol. III. Boston, 1855.
- Spenser, Edmund. "Complete Works of Edmund Spenser: A Variorum Edition".John Wesley Hales ed. MacMillan, 1893.
- Waller.G. "Edmund Spenser — A Literary Life". Palgrave Macmillan, 1994.
