= Kilcolman Bog =

Bog in County Cork, Ireland

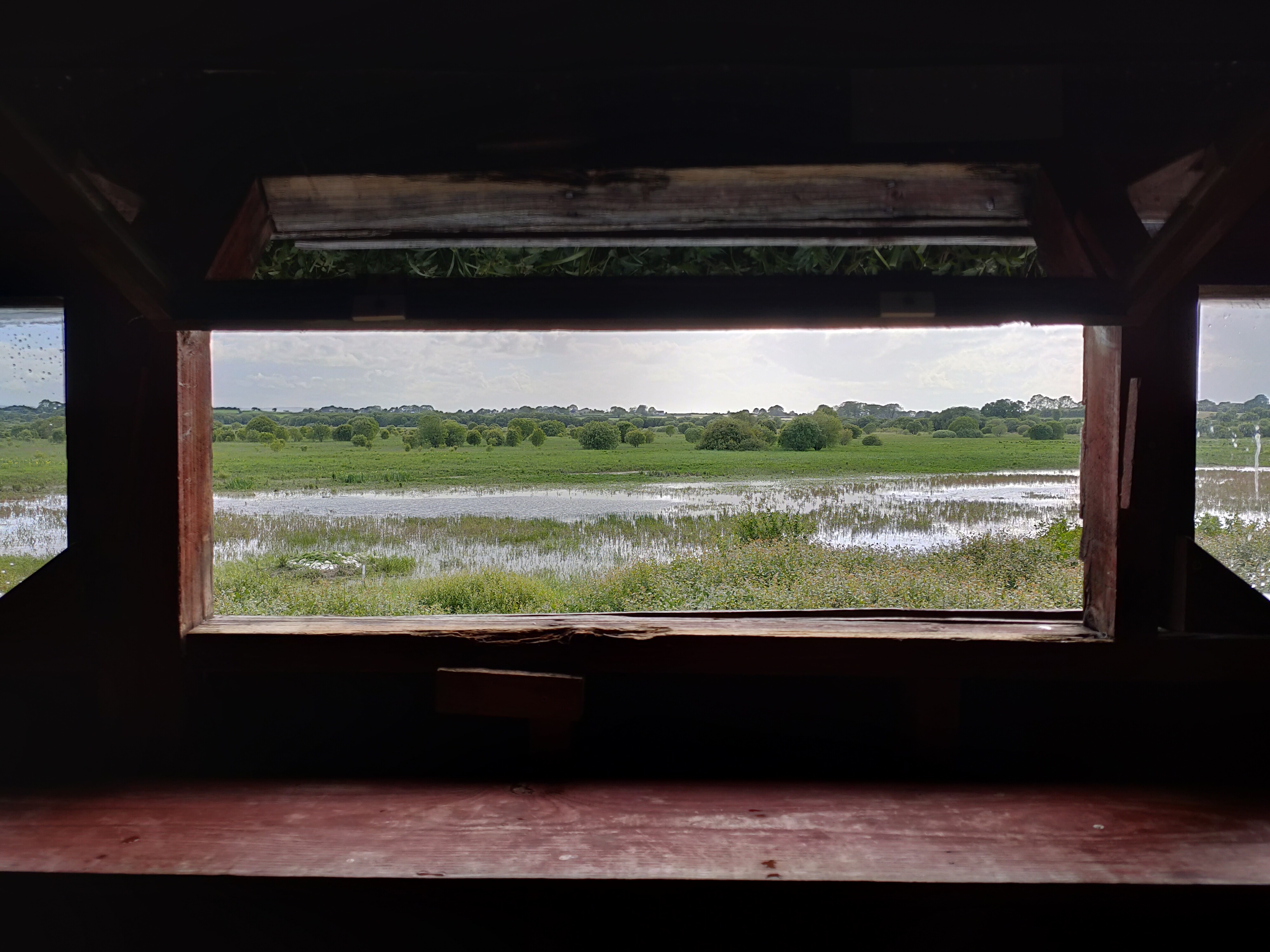
- Kilcolman Bog from the Hide
- Interactive map of Kilcolman Bog
- Location: County Cork, Ireland
- Coordinates: 52°14′53″N 8°36′47″W
- Area: 74 acres (0.30 km^{2})
- Governing body: Birdwatch Ireland and National Parks and Wildlife Service

Kilcolman Bog is a national nature reserve of approximately 74 acres (0.30 km^{2}) in County Cork.

== Features ==
Kilcolman Bog was legally protected as a national nature reserve by the Irish government in 1993. Most of the reserve, 52 acres (0.21 km^{2}), is privately owned, with a small part in state ownership 22 acres (0.089 km^{2}). It is also a Special Protection Area.

Kilcolman Bog is a fen and is located south of the Ballyhoura Mountains. It formed in a limestone hollow which was eroded by glaciers. Greenland white fronted geese and thousands of duck overwinter in the reserve. There is also an abundance of flora which are unique or rare to County Cork.

There are bird hides and boardwalks on the reserve. In 2017, Birdwatch Ireland took ownership of the private parts of the reserve from the previous owners, Richard and Margaret Ridgway.
