= Edmund Spenser =

English poet (c. 1552–1599)

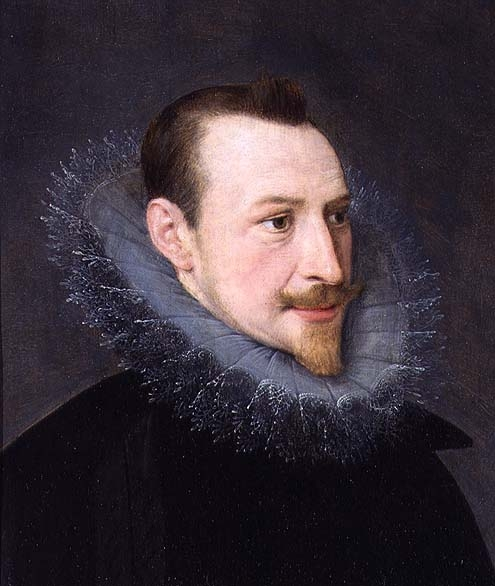
- Born: 1552/1553; London, England
- Died: 13 January 1599 (aged 46); London, England
- Resting place: Westminster Abbey
- Education: Pembroke College, Cambridge (M.A.)
- Occupations: Poet; state servant
- Spouses: Machabyas Childe (c. 1579–c. 1593, her death); Elizabeth Boyle (m. 1594–1599, his death)
- Children: 2
- Writing career
- Pen name: Immerito (in 1579)
- Language: Early Modern English
- Years active: 1569–1599
- Period: Elizabethan era
- Genres: Epic poem; eclogue; sonnet; elegy; hymn; epithalamium; beast fable; poetical autobiography; political treatise; history; translation; correspondence
- Subjects: Love; beauty; beautiful lady; pastoral
- Notable work: The Faerie Queene
- Movements: English Renaissance; Petrarchism

Edmund Spenser (c. 1552 – 13 January 1599 O.S.) was an English poet who is best known for having written The Faerie Queene, an epic poem and fantastical allegory that celebrates the Tudor dynasty and Elizabeth I. He is recognized as being one of the premier craftsmen of nascent Modern English verse, and he is considered to be one of the great poets in the English language.

== Life ==
Edmund Spenser was born in East Smithfield, London, around the year 1552; however, there is still some ambiguity as to the exact date of his birth. His parentage is obscure, but he was probably the son of John Spenser, a journeyman clothmaker. As a young boy, he was educated in London at the Merchant Taylors' School and matriculated as a sizar at Pembroke College, Cambridge. While at Cambridge he became a friend of Gabriel Harvey (1545–1631) and later consulted him, despite their differing views on poetry. In 1578, he became for a short time secretary to John Young, Bishop of Rochester. In 1579, he published The Shepheardes Calender and around the same time married his first wife, Machabyas Childe. They had two children, Sylvanus (died 1638) and Katherine.

In July 1580, Spenser went to Ireland in service of the newly appointed Lord Deputy, Arthur Grey, 14th Baron Grey de Wilton. Spenser served under Lord Grey with Walter Raleigh at the siege of Smerwick massacre. When Lord Grey was recalled to England, Spenser stayed on in Ireland, having acquired other official posts and lands in the Munster Plantation. Raleigh acquired other nearby Munster estates confiscated in the Second Desmond Rebellion. Sometime between 1587 and 1589, Spenser acquired his main estate at Kilcolman, near Doneraile in North Cork. He later bought a second holding to the south, at Rennie, on a rock overlooking the river Blackwater in North Cork. Its ruins are still visible. A short distance away grew a tree, locally known as "Spenser's Oak", until it was destroyed in a lightning strike in the 1960s. Local legend claims that he penned some of The Faerie Queene under this tree.

In 1590, Spenser brought out the first three books of his most famous work, The Faerie Queene, having travelled to London to publish and promote the work, with the likely assistance of Raleigh. He was successful enough to obtain a life pension of £50 a year from the Queen. He probably hoped to secure a place at court through his poetry, but his next significant publication boldly antagonised the queen's principal secretary, Lord Burghley (William Cecil), through its inclusion of the satirical Mother Hubberd's Tale. He returned to Ireland. He was at the centre of a literary circle whose members included his lifelong friend Lodowick Bryskett and Dr. John Longe, Archbishop of Armagh.

In 1591, Spenser published a translation in verse of Joachim Du Bellay's sonnets, Les Antiquités de Rome, which had been published in 1558. Spenser's version, Ruines of Rome: by Bellay, may also have been influenced by Latin poems on the same subject, written by Jean or Janis Vitalis and published in 1576.

By 1594, Spenser's first wife had died, and in that year he married a much younger Elizabeth Boyle, a relative of Richard Boyle, 1st Earl of Cork. He addressed to her the sonnet sequence Amoretti. The marriage was celebrated in Epithalamion. They had a son named Peregrine.

In 1596, Spenser wrote a prose pamphlet titled A View of the Present State of Irelande. This piece, in the form of a dialogue, circulated in manuscript, remaining unpublished until the mid-17th century. It is probable that it was kept out of print during the author's lifetime because of its inflammatory content. The pamphlet argued that Ireland would never be totally "pacified" by the English until its indigenous language and customs had been destroyed, if necessary by violence.

In 1598, during the Nine Years' War, Spenser was driven from his home by the native Irish forces of Hugh O'Neill. His castle at Kilcolman was burned, and Ben Jonson, who may have had private information, asserted that one of his infant children died in the blaze.

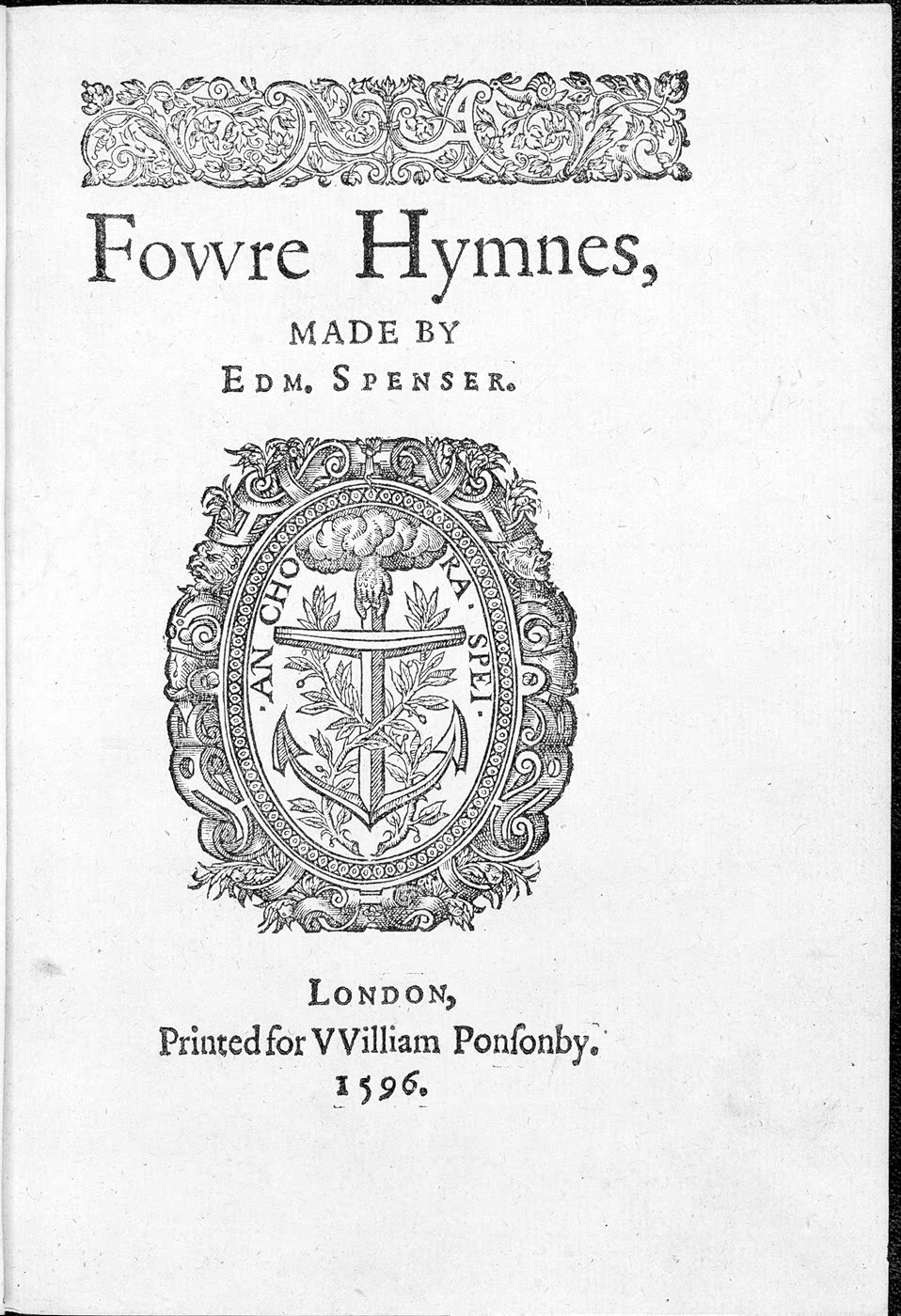
Title page, Fowre Hymnes, by Edmund Spenser, published by William Ponsonby, London, 1596

In the year after being driven from his home, 1599, Spenser travelled to London, where he died at the age of forty-six – "for want of bread", according to Ben Jonson; one of Jonson's more doubtful statements, since Spenser had a payment to him authorised by the government and was due his pension. His coffin was carried to his grave, deliberately near that of Geoffrey Chaucer, in what became known as Poets' Corner in Westminster Abbey by other poets, who threw many pens and pieces of poetry into his grave. His second wife survived him and remarried twice. His sister Sarah, who had accompanied him to Ireland, married into the Travers family, and her descendants were prominent landowners in Cork for centuries.

== Rhyme and reason ==
Thomas Fuller, in Worthies of England, included a story where the Queen told her treasurer, William Cecil, to pay Spenser £100 for his poetry. The treasurer, however, objected that the sum was too much. She said, "Then give him what is reason". Without receiving his payment in due time, Spenser gave the Queen this quatrain on one of her progresses:

I was promis'd on a time,
To have a reason for my rhyme:
From that time unto this season,
I receiv'd nor rhyme nor reason.

She immediately ordered the treasurer to pay Spenser the original £100.

This story seems to have attached itself to Spenser from Thomas Churchyard, who apparently had difficulty in getting payment of his pension, the only other pension Elizabeth awarded to a poet. Spenser seems to have had no difficulty in receiving payment when it was due as the pension was being collected for him by his publisher, Ponsonby.

== The Shepheardes Calender ==
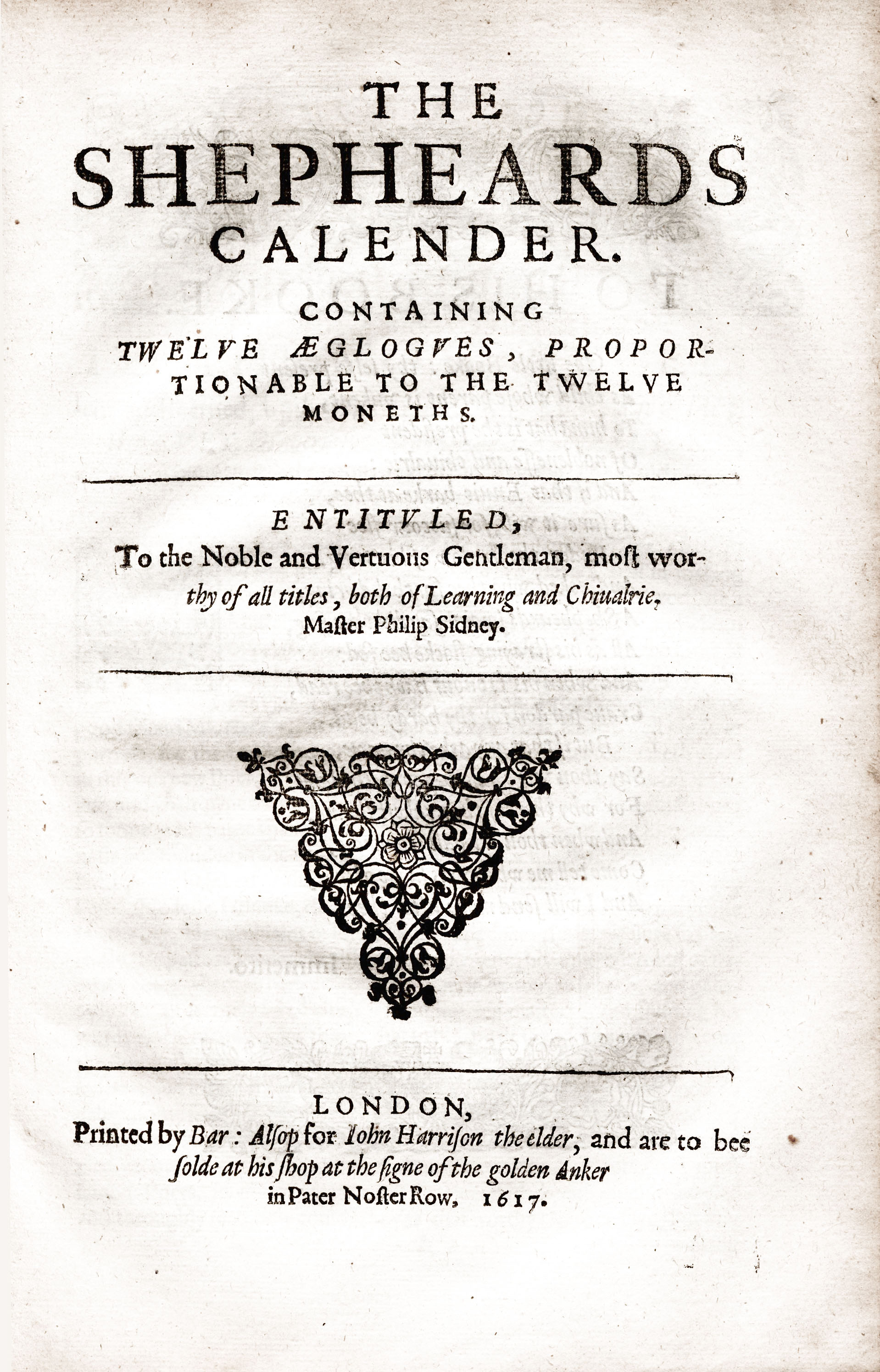
Title Page of a 1617 Edition of The Shepheardes Calender printed by Matthew Lownes, often bound with the complete works printed in 1611 or 1617.

The Shepheardes Calender is Edmund Spenser's first major work, which appeared in 1579. It emulates Virgil's Eclogues of the first century BCE and the Eclogues of Mantuan by Baptista Mantuanus, a late medieval, early renaissance poet. An eclogue is a short pastoral poem that is in the form of a dialogue or soliloquy. Although all the months together form an entire year, each month stands alone as a separate poem. Editions of the late 16th and early 17th centuries include woodcuts for each month/poem, and thereby have a slight similarity to an emblem book which combines a number of self-contained pictures and texts, usually a short vignette, saying, or allegory with an accompanying illustration.

== The Faerie Queene ==
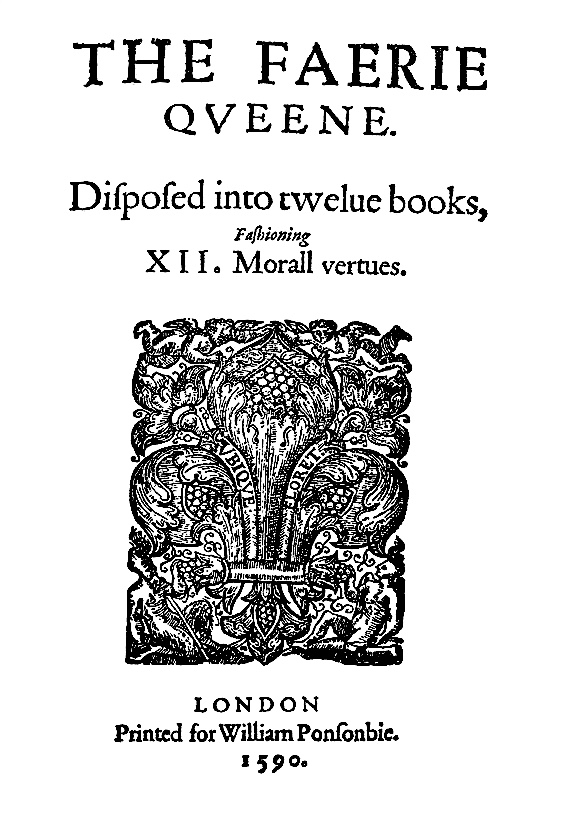
The epic poem The Faerie Queene frontispiece, printed by William Ponsonby in 1590.

Spenser's masterpiece is the epic poem The Faerie Queene. The first three books of The Faerie Queene were published in 1590, and the second set of three books was published in 1596. Spenser originally indicated that he intended the poem to consist of twelve books, so the version of the poem we have today is incomplete. Despite this, it remains one of the longest poems in the English language. It is an allegorical work, and can be read (as Spenser presumably intended) on several levels of allegory, including as praise of Queen Elizabeth I. In a completely allegorical context, the poem follows several knights in an examination of several virtues. In Spenser's "A Letter of the Authors", he states that the entire epic poem is "cloudily enwrapped in allegorical devises", and that the aim behind The Faerie Queene was to "fashion a gentleman or noble person in virtuous and gentle discipline".

Curiously, there was an aspect of personal resonance affecting Spenser's portrayal of his intended "gentleman or noble person." It was rumoured how his close friend Gabriel Harvey slipped into this role. It seems the characterization of 'Hobbinoll' in Spenser's The Shepheardes Calendar, which also appears prefixed to The Faerie Queen, may be attributed to Harvey. If so, this shows Spenser's magnanimity ready to spoil a friend and fellow poet by having him included in the preamble to his work.

== Shorter poems ==
Spenser published numerous relatively short poems in the last decade of the 16th century, almost all of which consider love or sorrow. In 1591, he published Complaints, a collection of poems that express complaints in mournful or mocking tones. Four years later, in 1595, Spenser published Amoretti and Epithalamion. This volume contains eighty-nine sonnets commemorating his courtship of Elizabeth Boyle. In Amoretti, Spenser uses subtle humour and parody while praising his beloved, reworking Petrarchism in his treatment of longing for a woman. Epithalamion, similar to Amoretti, deals in part with the unease in the development of a romantic and sexual relationship. It was written for his wedding to his young bride, Elizabeth Boyle. Some have speculated that the attention to disquiet, in general, reflects Spenser's personal anxieties at the time, as he was unable to complete his most significant work, The Faerie Queene. In the following year, Spenser released Prothalamion, a wedding song written for the daughters of a duke, allegedly in hopes to gain favour in the court.

== The Spenserian stanza and sonnet ==
Spenser used a distinctive verse form, called the Spenserian stanza, in several works, including The Faerie Queene. The stanza's main metre is iambic pentameter with a final line in iambic hexameter (having six feet or stresses, known as an Alexandrine), and the rhyme scheme is ababbcbcc. He also used his own rhyme scheme for the sonnet. In a Spenserian sonnet, the last line of every quatrain is linked with the first line of the next one, yielding the rhyme scheme ababbcbccdcdee. "Men call you fayre" is a fine sonnet from Amoretti:

Men call you fayre, and you doe credit it,
for that your selfe ye dayly such doe see:
but the trew fayre, that is the gentle wit,
and vertuous mind is much more praysd of me.
For all the rest, how euer fayre it be,
shall turne to nought and loose that glorious hew:
but onely that is permanent and free
from frayle corruption, that doth flesh ensew.
That is true beautie: that doth argue you
to be diuine and borne of heauenly seed:
deriu'd from that fayre Spirit, from whom all true
and perfect beauty did at first proceed.
He onely fayre, and what he fayre hath made,
all other fayre like flowres vntymely fade.

The poet presents the concept of true beauty in the poem. He addresses the sonnet to his beloved, Elizabeth Boyle, and presents his courtship. Like all Renaissance men, Edmund Spenser believed that love is an inexhaustible source of beauty and order. In this Sonnet, the poet expresses his idea of true beauty. The physical beauty will finish after a few days; it is not a permanent beauty. He emphasises beauty of mind and beauty of intellect. He considers his beloved is not simply flesh but is also a spiritual being. The poet opines that he is beloved born of heavenly seed and she is derived from fair spirit. The poet states that because of her clean mind, pure heart and sharp intellect, men call her fair and she deserves it. At the end, the poet praises her spiritual beauty and he worships her because of her Divine Soul.

== Influences ==
Though Spenser was well-read in classical literature, scholars have noted that his poetry does not rehash tradition, but rather is distinctly his. This individuality may have resulted, to some extent, from a lack of comprehension of the classics. Spenser strove to emulate such ancient Roman poets as Virgil and Ovid, whom he studied during his schooling, but many of his best-known works are notably divergent from those of his predecessors. The language of his poetry is purposely archaic, reminiscent of earlier works such as The Canterbury Tales of Geoffrey Chaucer and Il Canzoniere of Petrarch, whom Spenser greatly admired.

An Anglican and a devotee of the Protestant Queen Elizabeth, Spenser was particularly offended by the anti-Elizabethan propaganda that some Catholics circulated. Like most Protestants near the time of the Reformation, Spenser saw a Catholic church full of corruption, and he determined that it was not only the wrong religion but the anti-religion. This sentiment is an important backdrop for the battles of The Faerie Queene.

Spenser was called "the Poet's Poet" by Charles Lamb, and was admired by John Milton, William Blake, William Wordsworth, John Keats, Lord Byron, Alfred Tennyson and others. Among his contemporaries Walter Raleigh wrote a commendatory poem to The Faerie Queene in 1590 in which he claims to admire and value Spenser's work more so than any other in the English language. John Milton in his Areopagitica mentions "our sage and serious poet Spenser, whom I dare be known to think a better teacher than Scotus or Aquinas". In the 18th century, Alexander Pope compared Spenser to "a mistress, whose faults we see, but love her with them all".

== A View of the Present State of Irelande ==
In his work A View of the Present State of Irelande (1596), Spenser discussed future plans to establish control over Ireland, the most recent Irish uprising, led by Hugh O'Neill having demonstrated the futility of previous efforts. The work is partly a defence of Lord Arthur Grey de Wilton, who was appointed Lord Deputy of Ireland in 1580, and who greatly influenced Spenser's thinking on Ireland.

The goal of the piece was to show that Ireland was in great need of reform. Spenser believed that "Ireland is a diseased portion of the State, it must first be cured and reformed, before it could be in a position to appreciate the good sound laws and blessings of the nation". In A View of the Present State of Ireland, Spenser categorises the "evils" of the Irish people into three prominent categories: laws, customs and religion. According to Spenser, these three elements worked together in creating the supposedly "disruptive and degraded people" who inhabited the country. One example given in the work is the Irish law system termed "Brehon law", which at the time trumped the established law as dictated by the Crown. The Brehon system had its own court and methods of punishing infractions committed. Spenser viewed this system as a backward custom which contributed to the "degradation" of the Irish people. A particular legal punishment viewed with distaste by Spenser was the Brehon method of dealing with murder, which was to impose an éraic (fine) on the murderer's family. From Spenser's viewpoint, the appropriate punishment for murder was capital punishment. Spenser also warned of the dangers that allowing the education of children in the Irish language would bring: "Soe that the speach being Irish, the hart must needes be Irishe; for out of the aboundance of the hart, the tonge speaketh".

He pressed for a scorched earth policy in Ireland, noting its effectiveness in the Second Desmond Rebellion:

"'Out of everye corner of the woode and glenns they came creepinge forth upon theire handes, for theire legges could not beare them; they looked Anatomies [of] death, they spake like ghostes, crying out of theire graves; they did eate of the carrions, happye wheare they could find them, yea, and one another soone after, in soe much as the verye carcasses they spared not to scrape out of theire graves; and if they found a plott of water-cresses or shamrockes, theyr they flocked as to a feast... in a shorte space there were none almost left, and a most populous and plentyfull countrye suddenly lefte voyde of man or beast: yett sure in all that warr, there perished not manye by the sworde, but all by the extreamytie of famine ... they themselves had wrought.'"

== List of works ==
1569:

- Jan van der Noodt's A Theatre for Worldlings, including poems translated into English by Spenser from French sources, published by Henry Bynneman in London

1579:

- The Shepheardes Calender, published under the pseudonym "Immerito" (entered into the Stationers' Register in December)
- Iambicum Trimetrum

1590:

- The Faerie Queene, Books 1–3

1591:

- Complaints, Containing Sundrie Small Poemes of the Worlds Vanitie (entered into the Stationer's Register in 1590), includes:
  - "The Ruines of Time"
  - "The Teares of the Muses"
  - "Virgil's Gnat"
  - "Prosopopoia, or Mother Hubberds Tale"
  - "Ruines of Rome: by Bellay"
  - "Muiopotmos, or the Fate of the Butterflie"
  - "Visions of the Worlds Vanitie"
  - "The Visions of Bellay"
  - "The Visions of Petrarch"

1592:

- Axiochus, a translation of a pseudo-Platonic dialogue from the original Ancient Greek; published by Cuthbert Burbie; attributed to "Edw: Spenser" but the attribution is uncertain
- Daphnaïda. An Elegy upon the Death of the Noble and Vertuous Douglas Howard, Daughter and Heire of Henry Lord Howard, Viscount Byndon, and Wife of Arthure Gorges Esquier (published in London in January, according to one source; another source gives 1591 as the year) It was dedicated to Helena, Marchioness of Northampton.

1595:

- Amoretti and Epithalamion, containing:
  - "Amoretti"
  - "Epithalamion"
- Astrophel. A Pastorall Elegie vpon the Death of the Most Noble and Valorous Knight, Sir Philip Sidney
- Colin Clouts Come Home Againe

1596:

- Fowre Hymnes dedicated from the court at Greenwich; published with the second edition of Daphnaida
- Prothalamion
- The Faerie Queene, Books 4–6
- Babel, Empress of the East – a dedicatory poem prefaced to Lewes Lewkenor's The Commonwealth of Venice, 1599.

Posthumous:

- 1609: Two Cantos of Mutabilitie published together with a reprint of The Faerie Queene
- 1611: First folio edition of Spenser's collected works
- 1633: A Vewe of the Present State of Irelande, a prose treatise on the reformation of Ireland, first published by Sir James Ware (historian) entitled The Historie of Ireland (Spenser's work was entered into the Stationer's Register in 1598 and circulated in manuscript but not published until it was edited by Ware)

== Editions ==
- Edmund Spenser, Selected Letters and Other Papers. Edited by Christopher Burlinson and Andrew Zurcher (Oxford, OUP, 2009).
- Edmund Spenser, The Faerie Queene (Longman-Annotated-English Poets, 2001, 2007) Edited by A. C. Hamilton, Text Edited by Hiroshi Yamashita and Toshiyuki Suzuki.

== Digital archive ==
Washington University in St. Louis professor Joseph Lowenstein, with the assistance of several undergraduate students, has been involved in creating, editing, and annotating a digital archive of the first publication of poet Edmund Spenser's collective works in 100 years. A large grant from the National Endowment for the Humanities has been given to support this ambitious project centralized at Washington University with support from other colleges in the United States.

== Sources ==
- Croft, Ryan J. "Sanctified Tyrannicide: Tyranny And Theology in John Ponet's Shorte Treatise of Politike Power And Edmund "Spenser's The Faerie Queene." Studies in Philosophy, 108.4 (2011): 538–571. MLA International Bibliography. Web. 8 October 2012.
- Dasenbrock, Reed Way (January 1985). "The Petrarchan Context of Spenser's Amoretti". PMLA. 100 (1).
- Elliott, John, ed. (1968). The Prince of Poets. New York: New York University Press. ISBN 0-8020-2676-1.
- Hadfield, Andrew, ed. (2001). The Cambridge Companion to Spenser. Cambridge: Cambridge University Press. ISBN 0-521-64199-3.
- Hadfield, Andrew (2012). Edmund Spenser: A Life. Oxford University Press. ISBN 978-0-521-64199-9.
- Henderson, A. C., ed. (1990). The Spenser Encyclopedia. Toronto: University of Toronto Press. ISBN 0-8020-2676-1.
- Henley, Pauline. Spenser in Ireland. Cork: Cork University Press, 1928.
- Johnson, William. "The struggle between good and evil in the first book of 'The Faerie Queene'." English Studies, Vol. 74,
- Maley, Willy. "Spenser's Life". The Oxford Dictionary of Edmund Spenser. Ed. Richard A. McCabe. 1st Ed. 2010. Print.
- Rust, Jennifer. "Spenser's The Faerie Queene." Saint Louis University, St. Louis. 10 October 2007. No. 6. (December 1993) p. 507–519.
- Wadoski, Andrew. Spenser's Ethics: Empire, Mutability, and Moral Philosophy in Early Modernity. Manchester University Press, June 2022, ISBN 978-1-5261-6543-5.
- Zarucchi, Jeanne Morgan. "Du Bellay, Spenser, and Quevedo Search for Rome: A Teacher's Peregrination." The French Review, 17:2 (December 1997), pp. 192–203.

Preceded by: John Skelton	English Poet Laureate c. 1590–1599	Succeeded by: Samuel Daniel
Political offices
Preceded by Edmund Molyneux	Chief Secretary for Ireland; 1580–1582	Succeeded by Philip Williams
