= Amoretti =

Sonnet cycle by Edmund Spenser

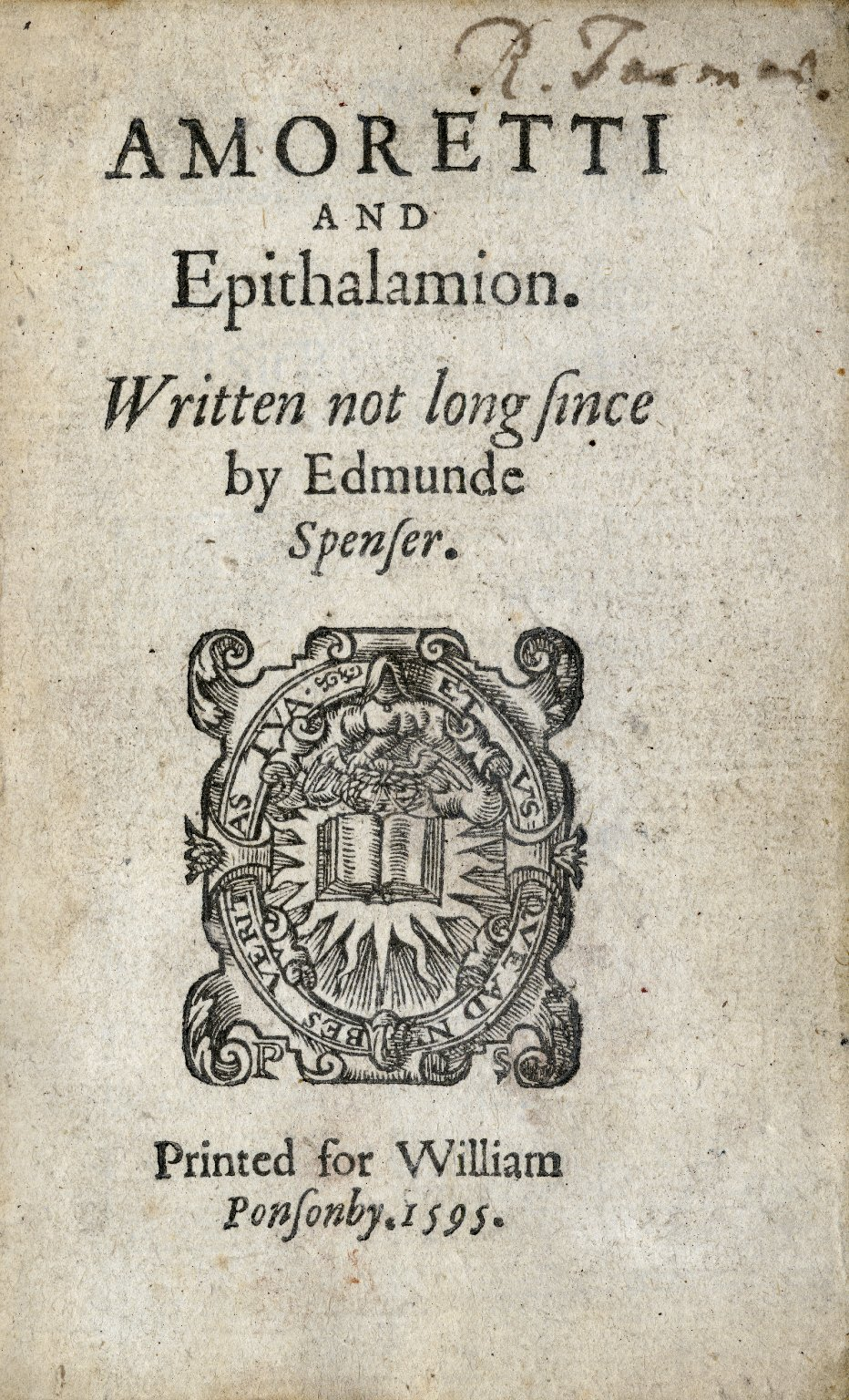
The title page from the first edition of Amoretti and Epithalamion, printed by William Ponsonby in 1595.

Amoretti is a sonnet cycle written by Edmund Spenser in the 16th century. The cycle describes his courtship and eventual marriage to Elizabeth Boyle.

Amoretti was first published in 1595 in London by William Ponsonby. It was printed as part of a volume entitled Amoretti and Epithalamion. Written not long since by Edmunde Spenser. The volume included the sequence of 89 sonnets, along with a series of short poems called Anacreontics and Epithalamion, a public poetic celebration of marriage. Only six complete copies remain today, including one at the Folger Shakespeare Library in Washington, D.C., and one at Oxford's Bodleian Library. "The volume memorializes Spenser's courtship of Elizabeth Boyle, a young, well-born Anglo-Irish woman, and the couple's wedding on June 11, 1594". In the sonnets of Amoretti Spenser succeeds in "immortalizing the name of his bride to be ... by devices of word play". In these cycles of sonnets, Spenser chronicles the progress of his love for his beloved, Elizabeth Boyle, and then records his marriage to her. He even writes about his breakup with wife (sonnet 34) in Amoretti.

Amoretti has been largely overlooked and unappreciated by critics, who see it as inferior to other major Renaissance sonnet sequences in the Petrarchan tradition. In addition, it has been overshadowed by Spenser's other works, most notably The Faerie Queene, his epic allegorical masterpiece. C. S. Lewis, among the most important twentieth-century Spenser scholars, said that "Spenser was not one of the great sonneteers". However, other critics consider Spenser's sonnets to be innovative and to express a range of tones and emotions, and much more skillful and subtle than generally recognized.

== Petrarchan context ==
The sonnets of Amoretti draw heavily on authors of the Petrarchan tradition, most obviously Torquato Tasso and Petrarch himself. "In Amoretti, Spenser often uses the established topoi, for his sequence imitates in its own way the traditions of Petrarchan courtship and its associated Neoplatonic conceits". Apart from the general Neoplatonic conceit of spiritual love in opposition to physical love, he borrows specific images and metaphors, including those that portray the beloved or love itself as cruel tormenter. Many critics, in light of what they see as his overworking of old themes, view Spenser as being a less original and important sonneteer than contemporaries such as Shakespeare and Sir Philip Sidney.

However, Spenser also revised the tradition that he was drawing from. Amoretti breaks with conventional love poetry in a number of ways. In most sonnet sequences in the Petrarchan tradition, the speaker yearns for a lover who is sexually unavailable. Not only is there a conflict between spiritual and physical love, but the love object is often already married; it is an adulterous love. "Spenser's innovation was to dedicate an entire sequence to a woman he could honorably win". Elizabeth Boyle was an unmarried woman, and their love affair eventually ended in marriage.

In addition, the Petrarchan tradition tends to be obsessed with the instability and discontinuity of the love situation. The speaker's feelings, thoughts, and motives continually change and shift. The love situation is fraught with egotism, conflict, and continual transformations within the speaker. These conflicts are never resolved, but continue on endlessly as the poet is continually frustrated by the rejection of his beloved or his inability to reconcile spiritual and physical love. While Petrarch finds some semblance of resolution in rejection of physical love and the subsequent death of his beloved, and Renaissance Petrarchism tends to ignore resolution and glorify the state of indeterminacy, Spenser finds his own unique solution. He eventually moves away from the constant transformation and self-absorption of the Petrarchan love situation, and towards the "peace and rest Spenser finds in the sacred world of marriage". He represents the Protestant conception of marriage, celebrating it as a sanctuary in which two people can find peace and rest in a mutual love covenant, in which spiritual and physical love can exist in harmony rather than as contraries.

== Liturgical sources ==
The eighty-nine sonnets of the Amoretti were written to correspond with the scriptural readings prescribed by the Book of Common Prayer for specific dates in 1594. "Their conceits, themes, ideas, imagery, words, and sometimes their rhetorical structure consistently and successively match like particulars in these daily readings". Of the scriptural selections from a particular day, Spenser generally made use of the daily psalms or New Testament readings, often drawing upon the Gospel or Epistle for Sundays or feast days.

The sonnets begin on January 23 and end on May 17, and appear to be written for the period leading up to Spenser's wedding to Elizabeth Boyle on June 11. Sonnet 22 corresponds to Ash Wednesday. Sonnet 68 corresponds to Easter Sunday, and the 46 intervening sonnets generally match up with the scripture readings prescribed for the 46 days of the feast of Lent in 1594. The Pre-Lenten and Lenten sonnets, while somewhat conventional on the surface, contain multi-layers of "humor, salaciousness, irony, parody, and ultimately travesty" beneath the surface. The Easter sonnets take on a more serious, devotional tone, climaxing with a celebration of marriage as a covenant of grace in which the betrothed overcome the difficulties of lust and passion and are united in grace and mutual love.

The sequence of correspondences to daily scripture readings is not perfectly consecutive or uninterrupted, though. Sonnets 28–33 are an exception in that they bear no resemblance to the scripture readings from the days to which they could correspond. Larsen suggests that perhaps Spenser was not at home during the days 19–24 of February and had no access to scriptural resources because most bibles published at this time were not very portable. These sonnets tend to make more blatant and unoriginal use of Petrarchan conceits, and are more conventional and flat than the other poems.

Sonnets 52–53 are not related to a scriptural source either. Larsen points out that Sonnet 53 suggests travel through its explicit descriptions of absence from the beloved: "from presence of my dearest deare exylde" and "So I her absens will my penaunce make". This seems to support his claim that lack of correspondence might be explained by Spenser's travels.

With these exceptions, the correspondences run through Sonnet 75, which falls on April 7, the Sunday after Easter. Sonnets 76–89 correspond to the period from May 3 – May 17, the beginning of a new cycle of second lessons at morning prayer through the day before the Vigil of the feast of Pentecost, which fell on May 19. These sonnets tend to draw even more heavily on daily scriptural readings than the preceding 75. For example, Sonnet 82, which was written for the feast of the Ascension is full of allusions to the Ascension, especially in its final couplet: "Whose loft argument uplifting me, / shall lift you vp vnto an high degree". The sonnets from the period before Pentecost are characterized by a painful and anxious sense of expectation. With the happiness of marriage in view, the speaker still suffers from the current state of separation. This feeling is appropriate to the liturgical season, in which Christians eagerly await unification with God's spirit, which he sends down to them on Pentecost. Sonnet 87 contains the line, "Thus I the time with expectation spend".

When the sonnets of Amoretti are viewed in this liturgical context, one sees that Spenser's Petrarchan allusions and use of Petrarchan precedents cannot be reduced run-of-the-mill imitation. He adapts Petrarchan models and uses them to create connections to the day's scripture themes and imagery. In addition, he treats them with a smooth cadence and flow that tends to blur the distinctions within Petrarchan paradox rather than sharply separating the contraries. This correlates well with Spenser's goal of moving beyond the paradoxes and conflicts of love to the reconciliation and harmony embodied in marriage. "Spenser's working together of allusions and attitudes from both Petrarchist sources and scriptural loci intimates a poetic and a personal harmony, which in Amoretti becomes his ultimate preoccupation and goal”. This provides a sharp contrast to the focus of other Renaissance sonneteers, who tend to dwell on the indeterminacy and conflict of the lover's plight. Examining the underlying structure of the sequence and its religious parallels provides one key to appreciating the richness and complexity of Amoretti and establishing Spenser as one of the most important sixteenth-century sonneteers.
