= Epithalamion (poem) =

Poem by Edmund Spenser

- by Edmund Spenser
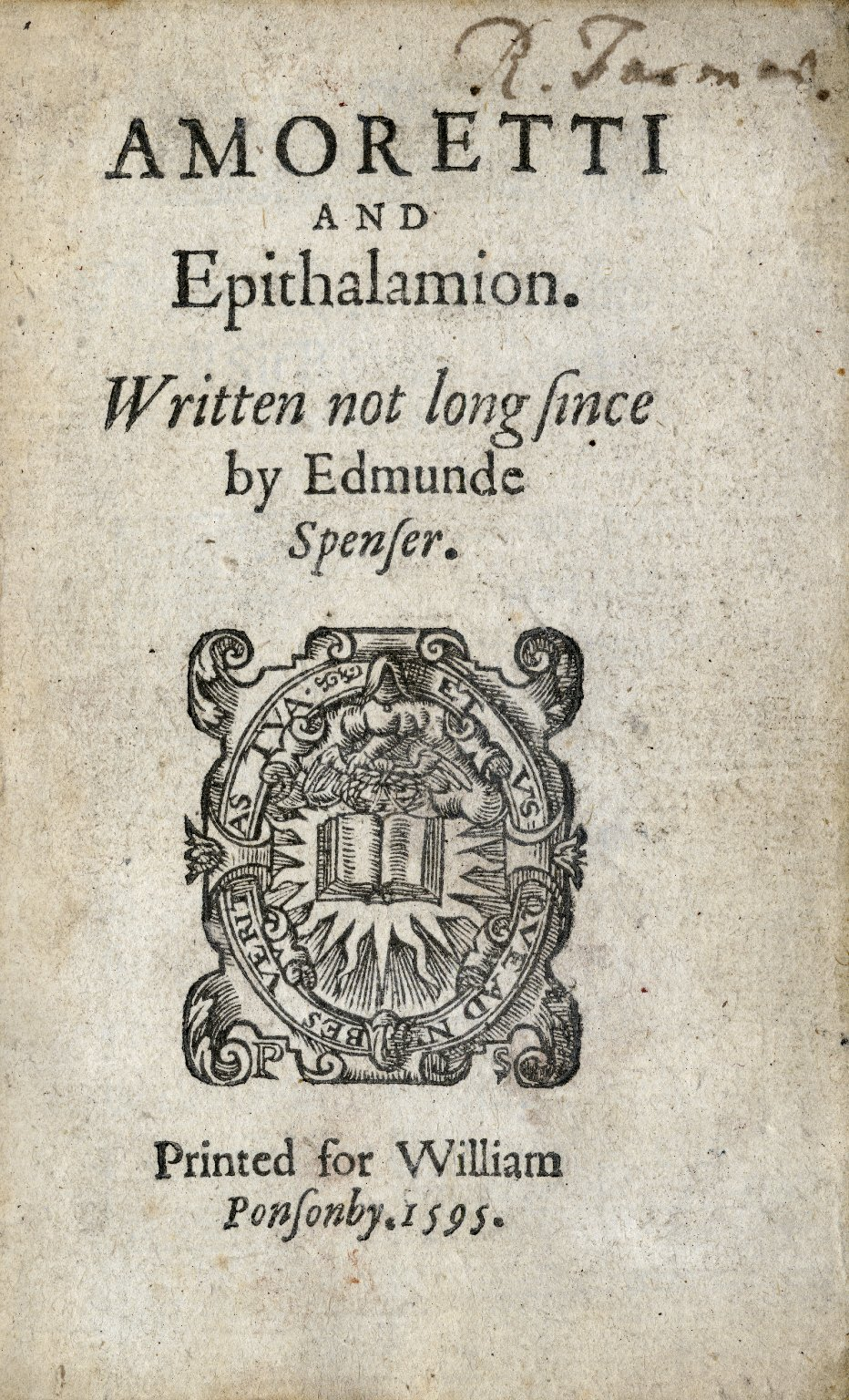
- The title page from the first edition of Amoretti and Epithalamion, printed by William Ponsonby in 1595.
- Country: England
- Language: English
- Genre: Epithalamium
- Publisher: William Ponsonby
- Publication date: 1595
- Lines: 433

Full text
- Epithalamion at Wikisource

Epithalamion is an ode written by Edmund Spenser to his bride, Elizabeth Boyle, on their wedding day in 1594. It was first published in 1595 in London by William Ponsonby as part of a volume entitled Amoretti and Epithalamion. Written not long since by Edmunde Spenser. The volume included the sequence of 89 sonnets (Amoretti), along with a series of short poems called Anacreontics and the Epithalamion, a public poetic celebration of marriage. Only six complete copies of this first edition remain today, including one at the Folger Shakespeare Library and one at the Bodleian Library.

The ode begins with an invocation to the Muses to help the groom, and moves through the couple's wedding day, from Spenser's impatient hours before dawn while waiting for his bride to wake up, to the late hours of night after Spenser and Boyle have consummated their marriage (wherein Spenser's thoughts drift towards the wish for his bride to have a fertile womb so that they may have many children).

Spenser meticulously records the hours of the day from before dawn to late into the wedding night: its 24 stanzas represent the hours of Midsummer Day. The ode's content progresses from the enthusiasm of youth to the concerns of middle age by beginning with high hopes for a joyful day and ending with an eye toward the speaker's legacy to future generations.

== Background ==
Spenser lived from 1552 to 1599. Works in this time period are considered Early Modern literature, which spanned from the Baroque period to the Age of Enlightenment. It saw writers such as Miguel de Cervantes, Daniel Defoe and Jonathan Swift in Europe. He was also considered to be a part of the Elizabethan era. It coincided with the reign of Queen Elizabeth I and is considered to be the literary height of the English Renaissance. Poetic forms such as love sonnets, the pastoral, and the allegorical epic were popular in this era.

== Summary ==
Epithalamion is a poem celebrating a marriage. An epithalamium is a song or poem written specifically for a bride on her way to the marital chamber. In Spenser's work, he is spending the day anxiously awaiting to marry Elizabeth Boyle. The poem describes the day in detail. The couple wakes up and Spenser begs the muses to help him on his artistic endeavor for the day. Spenser spends a majority of the poem praising his bride to be, which is depicted as both innocent and lustful.

When she finally wakes, the two head to the church. Hymen Hymenaeus is sung by the minstrels at the festivities. As the ceremony begins, Spenser shifts from praising Greek Gods and beings to Christian language to praise Elizabeth. After the ceremony, Spenser becomes even more anxious at the thought of consummating the marriage. Spenser then rebukes any idea of evil that could ruin their new found happiness. Spenser asks for blessings for childbearing, fidelity, and all things good at the end.

== Structure ==
Epithalamion follows a rhyme a scheme of ABABCC, DEDEFF, and so on (except the 15th stanza.). The structure is 24 stanzas, each with either 18 lines or 19 (15th stanza has 17 lines). The last stanza is an envoy (a short formal stanza which is appended to a poem by way of conclusion) with 7 lines. There are 433 lines in total.

In the 15th stanza, Spenser changes the structure. Throughout the poem, the stanzas are structured with 18 or 19 lines. In the 15th, there is a line missing. The rhyming structure typically goes ABABCC, then DEDEFF and so on. But stanza 15 is FEGGHH. This might have been done to keep the onomatopoeia of the poem or to keep the structure of the 365 lines as a metaphor for a year.

=== Numerology ===
There are 24 stanzas and 433 lines in the poem. There are 365 longer lines and 68 shorter lines. The 365 longer lines represent the year leading up to Spenser's wedding day. The poem starts at midnight of the day of the wedding, as Spenser grows anxious of the future he is embracing. Every stanza is an hour of that day, eventually leading to the event and then to the consummation. Every hour is described in detail; from what is being worn to where the wedding is taking place to Spenser's own thoughts. The 24 stanzas represent the 24 hours in a day and the 365 longer lines represent every day in a year. Spenser's wedding is one day; the first 16 stanzas are the day time and the last 8 are the night time, and the relationship with Boyle has been occurring for a year.

== Reception ==
Many modern scholars argue the effectiveness of Spenser's work.

James Lambert wrote about how the poem connected to the Protestant Reform of the time "Spenser’s Epithalamion reflects this communal joy as it narrates a public celebration of marriage, and does so in song and psalmic refrains. Spenser’s poetic interest in the earthly nature of joy takes Epithalamion beyond an expression of celebratory, communal joy and into a more private, secret joy that remains ineffable. Finally, the poem moves toward affective joy, bestowing a kind of blessedness, or even grace, upon the listener, much like the practice of reciting the Psalms itself was supposed to do. Countering the relative absence of joy as a lived emotion, Spenser’s Epithalamion sets out to combine the discourses of joy—psalmic praises, hymnody, spiritual comfort, heavenly foretaste, festivity, matrimony, and finally, sex—into an all-inclusive articulation."

Melissa Sanchez's essay praised the hidden messages in the poem, while James Larsen spoke of the poem in his critical edition: "Epithalamion is a poem which gives ritualized and public affect to the personal on a number of levels, cosmographical, publicly prayerful and euchological."

In 1929 British composer Edgar Bainton wrote his orchestral rhapsody Epithalamion, based on Spenser's poem.
