= John Stewart of Nateby Hall =

British naturalist

John Stewart of Nateby Hall FRSE FGS (10 January 1813 – 17 March 1867) was a British naturalist.

== Early life ==
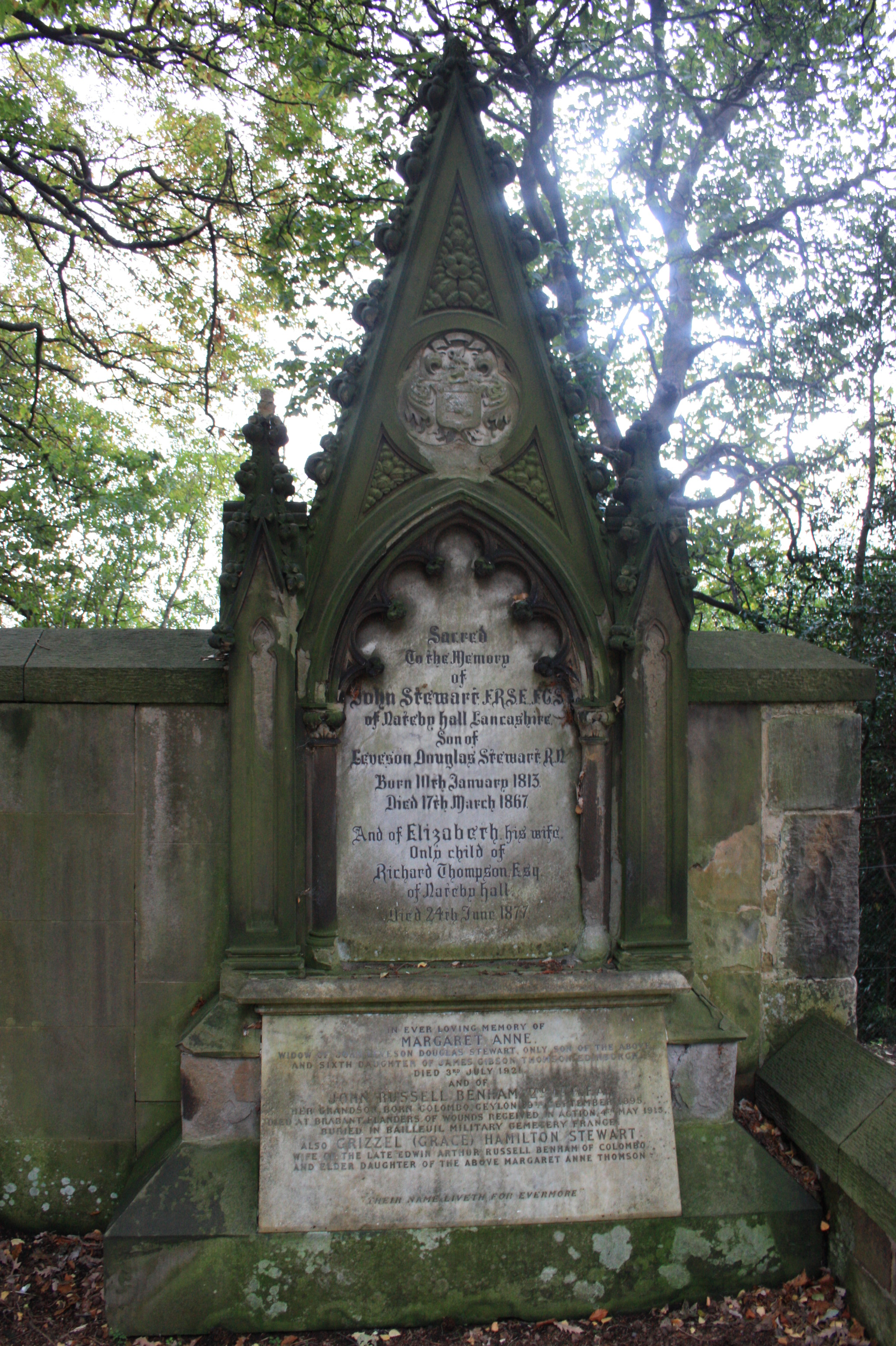
The grave of John Stewart of Nateby Hall, Dean Cemetery, Edinburgh

Stewart was born at Parkhouse in Stranraer on 10 January 1813. He was the eldest surviving son of Elizabeth Dalrymple-Hay and Lt. Levenson Douglas Stewart (1786–1819) of the Royal Navy. His father died when Stewart was only six years old.

His paternal grandfather was Vice Admiral The Hon. Keith Stewart of Glasserton (the second surviving son of Alexander Stewart, 6th Earl of Galloway) and his maternal grandfather was Sir John Dalrymple-Hay, 1st Baronet. His paternal uncle, James Alexander Stewart-Mackenzie, was married to Mary Elizabeth Frederica Mackenzie (the former wife of Vice Admiral Sir Samuel Hood and daughter of Francis Mackenzie, 1st Baron Seaforth).

He was educated at Edinburgh Academy 1824 to 1829. He then studied science at the University of Edinburgh.

== Career ==
In 1846, he was elected a Life Member of the Botanical Society of Edinburgh. Around 1850, upon death of his father-in-law, he inherited Nateby Hall in Lancashire and thereafter styled himself John Stewart of Nateby Hall.

He was elected a Fellow of the Royal Society of Edinburgh in 1851; his proposer was Sir James Young Simpson.

In 1853, he became a member of the Highland and Agricultural Society of Scotland.

== Personal life ==
In 1841, he married Elizabeth Thomson, daughter of Richard Thomson. They had one son:

- John Levenson Douglas Stewart (1842–1887) who was elected a Fellow of the Royal Society of Edinburgh in 1868 and who married Margaret Anne Thomson, daughter of James Gibson Thomson, in 1868.

He died on 17 March 1867. He is buried in Dean Cemetery in western Edinburgh. The grave lies on the southern wall at the extreme western edge of the southern terrace.

=== Descendants ===
Through his only son John, he was posthumously a grandfather of Grace Hamilton Stewart (d. 1966), who married Edwin Arthur Russell Benham in 1894, and Lt.-Col. John Stewart (1869–1931), who married Valentia Worship, daughter of William Worship, in 1891.
