= Ephraim Lópes Pereira d'Aguilar, 2nd Baron d'Aguilar =

Baron of the Holy Roman Empire

Ephraim Lópes Pereira d'Aguilar (1739 in Vienna – 1802 in London) was the second Baron d'Aguilar, a Barony of the Holy Roman Empire.

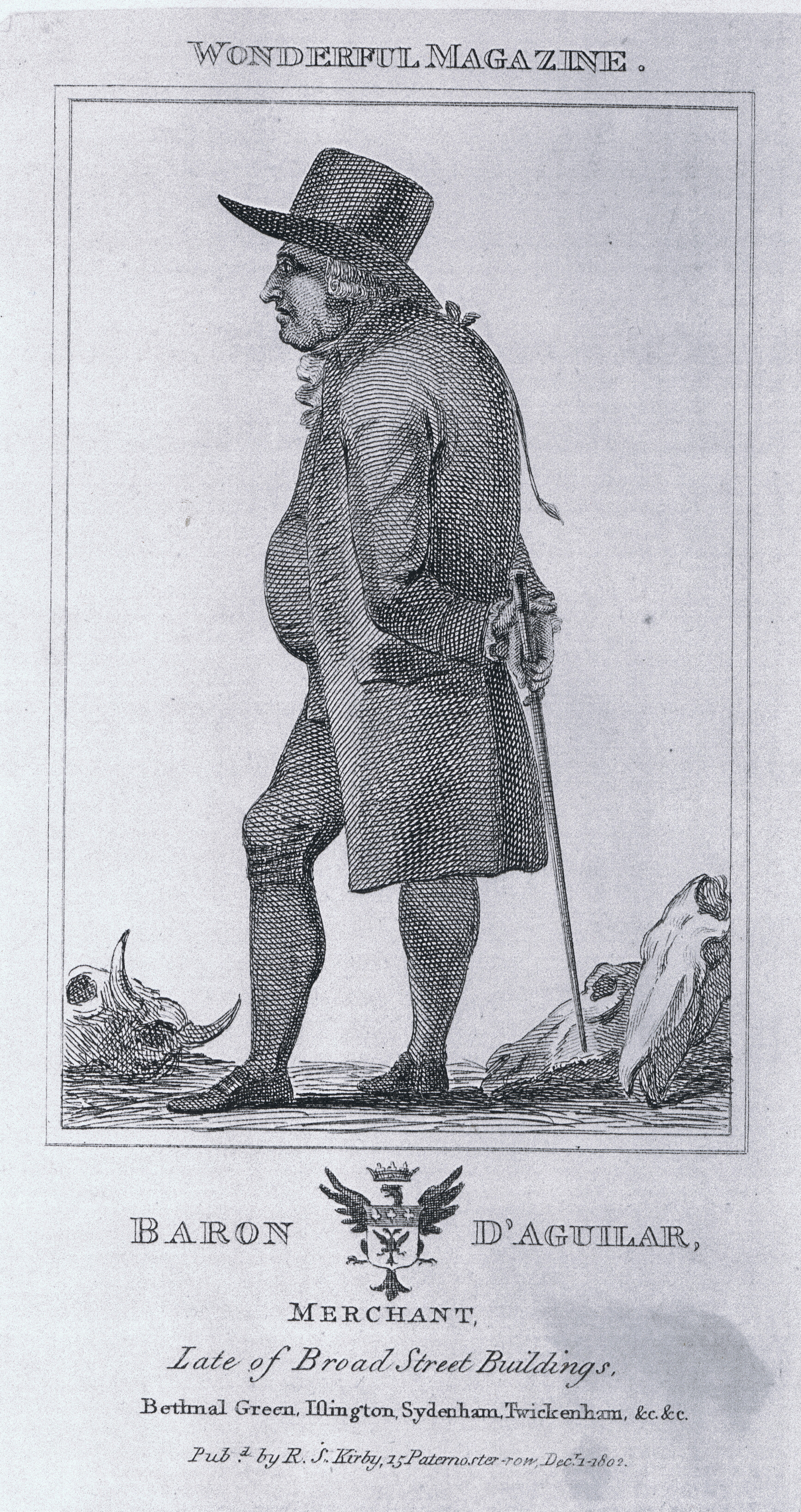
D'Aguilar, merchant, late of Broad Street Buildings, &c, 1802.

Baron D'Aguilar of Starvation Farm, engraved by B. Page, published by J. Robins & Co., London, 1821.

== Early life ==
He was a son of Simha da Fonseca, who died 1755, and Diego Pereira d'Aguilar, a Jewish businessman, community leader and philanthropist, originally a Portuguese converso.

In 1757, d'Aguilar was naturalized in England, where he had settled with his father.

== Career ==
He succeeded to his father's title and fortune upon his death on 10 August 1759 in London, and for a time lived in luxurious style with twenty servants at the Broad Street Buildings.

By the time of the American Revolutionary War, however, d'Aguilar had lost an American estate of 15,000 acres (61 km²). Subsequently, he became known as a miserly and eccentric person, giving up his mansion in Broad Street as well as his country houses at Bethnal Green, Twickenham, and Sydenham. His establishment at Colebrook Row, Islington, was popularly styled "Starvation Farm", because of the scanty food provided for the cattle. He became a freemason in 1778.

=== Public offices ===
D'Aguilar held various positions in his community, and served as treasurer of the Portuguese Synagogue; the minutes of the proceedings of the Mahamad bear the signature of Ephraim d'Aguilar. He was elected warden in 1765, but declined to serve, and refused on technical grounds to pay the fine. D'Aguilar was given eight days to accept the position or to submit to the penalty. He evidently submitted, since on 5 March 1767 he married for the second time. He would not have been able to marry her had he been lying under the ban. d'Aguilar was again elected to office in 1770, and for some years thereafter remained a member of the synagogue.

== Personal life ==
On 8 December 1756, he married Simha "Sarah" Mendes da Costa (c. 1742–1763), daughter of Moses Mendes da Costa and Catherine da Costa, who is reported to have brought him a fortune of £150,000. She was the mother of his two legitimate daughters. He also had a son. His children included:

- Georgina Isabella d'Aguilar, who married Vice Admiral The Hon. Keith Stewart (1739–1795), a son of Alexander Stewart, 6th Earl of Galloway and the former Lady Catherine Cochrane (the youngest daughter of John Cochrane, 4th Earl of Dundonald). Following his death, she married secondly, in 1797, Lt.-Col. Richard Fitzgerald, who was killed in action at the Battle of Waterloo.
- Caroline d'Aguilar

After the death of his first wife on 5 May 1763, d'Aguilar married Rebecca (née Lamego) da Costa on 5 March 1767. She was the daughter of Isaac Lamego, and widow of Benjamin Mendes da Costa, Chairman of the Committee of Diligence (and father of Benjamin Mendes da Costa, Australian merchant). When d'Aguilar took up his eccentric life, however, the couple separated. After twenty years, a partial reconciliation took place between the baron and his wife, but only for a short time.

Rebecca died on 30 November 1795. Upon his death at Islington in 1802, d'Aguilar left a fortune valued at £200,000 hidden throughout the dwelling to his two daughters who survived him.

=== Descendants ===
Through his daughter Georgina, he was a grandfather of Leveson Douglas Stewart and James Alexander Stewart (1784–1843), who married Mary Elizabeth Frederica Mackenzie, former wife of Vice Admiral Sir Samuel Hood, daughter of Francis Mackenzie, 1st Baron Seaforth and sister of Helen Anne Mackenzie (wife of Joshua Henry Mackenzie, Lord Mackenzie). After their marriage, he assumed the additional surname of Mackenzie.
