= James Murray (Scottish politician, 1727–1799) =

Scottish landowner, entrepreneur and politician

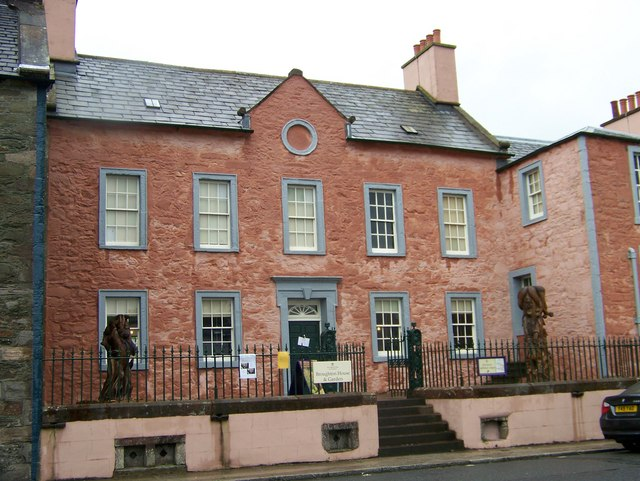
Broughton House, Kirkcudbright

James Murray (1727 – 30 April 1799) was a landowner and politician. He was a member of parliament (MP) from 1762 to 1774.

== Early life and family ==
Murray was the first-born son of Alexander Murray of Broughton in Wigtownshire and his wife Lady Euphemia Stewart, daughter of the 5th Earl of Galloway. He was educated at the University of Glasgow, and then went on the Grand Tour.

On his father's death, Murray inherited extensive estates in Scotland and Ireland. They included Broughton House in Kirkcudbright, Killybegs in County Donegal, and Cally House near Gatehouse of Fleet, which Murray rebuilt to the designs of Robert Mylne.

In 1752 he had married his first cousin Lady Catherine Stewart, daughter of his mother's brother the 6th Earl of Galloway. They had only one child, Alicia, who fell ill and died while on a holiday in Rome. However, Murray had already fathered an illegitimate daughter, Ann, born in 1750. Ann was raised at the Murray's Cally estate, with support of Lady Catherine.

In 1762, James and Catherine Murray met the writer James Boswell. In Boswell's words, James was a "most amiable man, [who] has very good sense, great knowledge of the world, and easy politeness of manners". He described Catherine as "very beautiful and, what is more, very agreeable, being possessed of the most engaging affability".

== Career ==
At the 1761 general election, Murray contested Wigtownshire on the interest of his relatives the Earls of Galloway, but lost by a small margin to John Hamilton of Bargany. Murray lodged a petition, with the support of the Marquess of Rockingham, and a compromise was negotiated whereby Hamilton resigned and was found an alternative seat in Wigtown Burghs.

At the 1768 general election, the Earl of Stewart displaced Murray from the Wigtownshire seat in favour of his son Keith Stewart, who was Murray's brother-in-law and first cousin. Murray was returned instead for Kirkcudbright Stewartry, but financial difficulties after the collapse of the Ayr Bank forced him to stand down in 1774. He voted regularly in Parliament, but did not speak in any debates.

From 1783 to 1784 Murray was the Receiver General of Land Tax for Scotland. From 1765 to 1773 he had been paid the salary for the job, without, actually doing it, and in 1766 he had turned down Rockingham's offer of formally taking the post.

He resigned as receiver in 1784, hoping to find another seat in Parliament, but the negotiations did not produce terms he could accept. Instead he eloped overseas with his mistress, whose child inherited his lands.

Parliament of Great Britain
Preceded by John Hamilton	Member of Parliament for Wigtownshire; 1762–1768	Succeeded by Keith Stewart
Preceded by John Ross Mackye	Member of Parliament for Kirkcudbright Stewartry; 1768–1774	Succeeded by William Stewart
