= Mary Elizabeth Frederica Mackenzie =

Chief of the Scottish clan Mackenzie (1783–1862)

Mary Stewart-MacKenzie
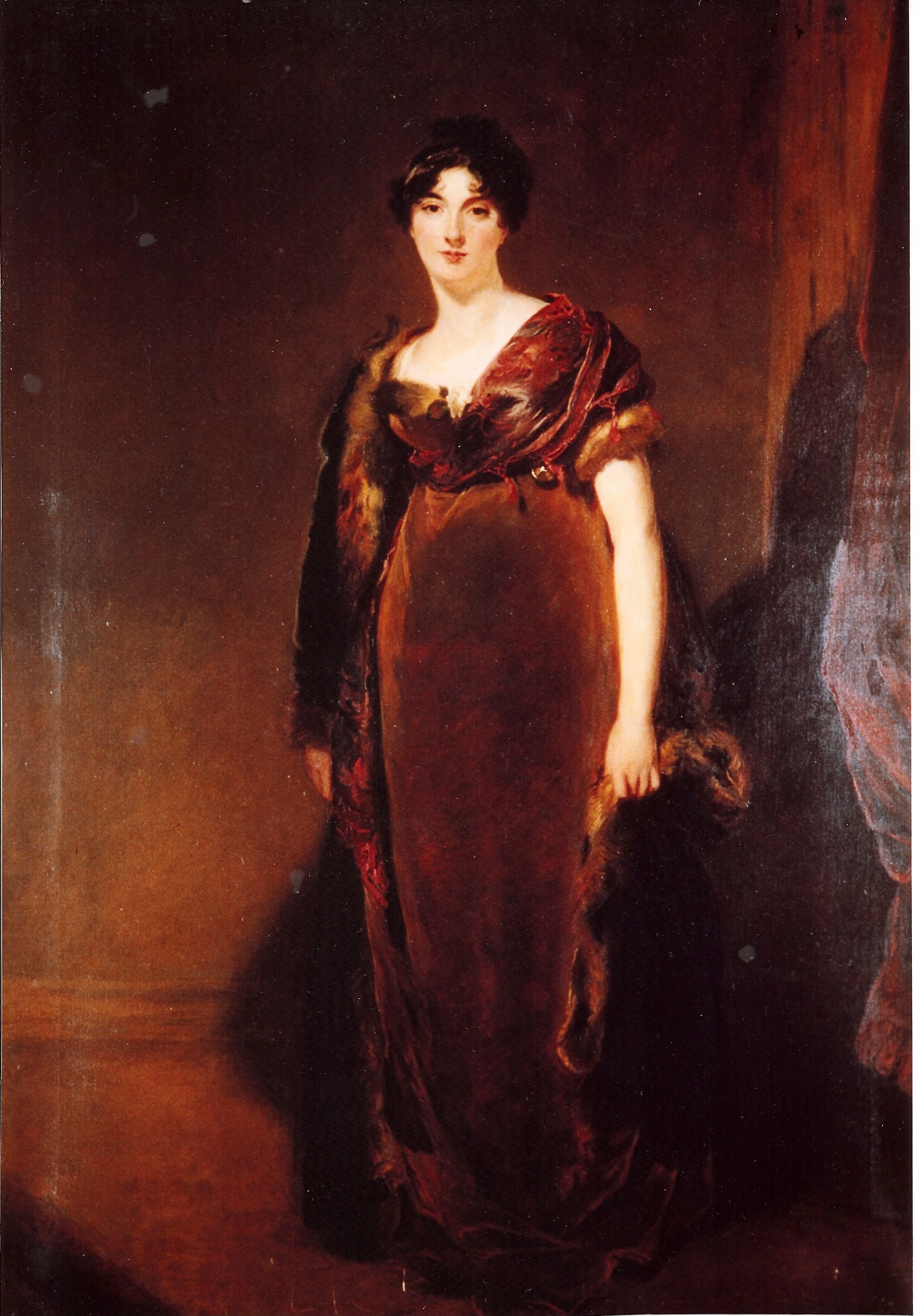
- Mary Mackenzie by Thomas Lawrence
- Born: Mary Elizabeth Frederica Mackenzie; 27 March 1783; Tarradale
- Died: 28 November 1862 (aged 79)
- Spouses: Sir Samuel Hood, 1st Baronet (m. 1804; died 1814) James Alexander Stewart (m. 1817; died 1843)
- Children: 5, including Louisa
- Parent(s): Francis Mackenzie, 1st Baron Seaforth; Mary Proby
- Relatives: James Stewart-Mackenzie, 1st Baron Seaforth (grandson)

Mary Elizabeth Frederica Mackenzie (27 March 1783 – 28 November 1862) was the eldest daughter and heiress of Francis Mackenzie, 1st Baron Seaforth. Also known as "Lady Hood Mackenzie", or by the sobriquet "The Hooded Lassie", she was married in turn to Vice Admiral Sir Samuel Hood and James Alexander Stewart of Glasserton.

== Early life ==
Mary was born at Tarradale House in Ross-shire, Scotland (near Muir of Ord) on 27 March 1783. She was the eldest daughter, and heiress, of Mary (née Proby) and Francis Mackenzie, 1st Baron Seaforth, chief of the Highland Clan Mackenzie, as which he raised the renowned 78th (Highlanders) Regiment of Foot. Her only sibling to marry was Helen Anne Mackenzie, the wife of Joshua Henry Mackenzie, Lord Mackenzie.

Her paternal grandparents were Maj. William Mackenzie (a grandson of Kenneth Mackenzie, 4th Earl of Seaforth and Lady Frances Herbert) and the former Mary Humberston (the daughter and heiress of Matthew Humberston of Humberston). Her maternal grandparents were Mary (née Russel) Proby and The Very Rev. Baptist Proby, 7th Dean of Lichfield (and brother of John Proby, 1st Baron Carysfort). Her uncle was Rev. Charles Proby, the Canon of Windsor.

== Personal life ==
Mary was twice married. She married her first husband, Vice Admiral Sir Samuel Hood, 1st Baronet of the Royal Navy on 6 November 1804 at Saint Michael, Barbados. He was a brother of Capt. Alexander Hood and had been one of Nelson's captains, the famous 'band of brothers'. Sir Samuel, who was also Member of Parliament for Westminster, died, without issue, on 24 December 1814.

Less than a month later, her father died on 11 January 1815. Mary succeeded her father and became heiress of his estate; however, his title became extinct as all four of Mary's brothers predeceased her father.

=== Second marriage ===
She married James Alexander Stewart of Glasserton, the son of Vice Admiral The Hon. Keith Stewart and a grandson of the Alexander Stewart, 6th Earl of Galloway. Her husband served as a Member of Parliament for Ross-shire and Ross and Cromarty before becoming the 7th Governor of British Ceylon. Together, they were the parents of:

- Keith William Stewart-MacKenzie (1818–1881), who married Hannah Charlotte Hope-Vere, a daughter of James Joseph Hope-Vere and Lady Elizabeth Hay (a daughter George Hay, 7th Marquess of Tweeddale). After her death in 1868, he married Alicia Almira Seymour Bell, daughter of Robert Henry Bell of Bellbrook, in 1871.
- Mary Frances Stewart-Mackenzie (1819–1913), who married Philip Anstruther, son of Col. Robert Anstruther, in 1838.
- Caroline Susan Stewart-Mackenzie (1822–1867), who married John Berney Petre, son of Jack Petre and Hon. Catherine Harbord (daughter of Harbord Harbord, 1st Baron Suffield), in 1844.
- George Augustus Frederick Wellington Stewart-Mackenzie (1824–1852), who married Maria Louisa Marriott, daughter of Lt.-Gen. Thomas Marriott, in 1850.
- Louisa Caroline Stewart-Mackenzie (1827–1903), who married Bingham Baring, 2nd Baron Ashburton.

Her husband died on 24 September 1843. Mary died on 28 November 1862 and was buried at Fortrose.

=== Legacy ===
Mackenzie was the subject of a portrait by Sir Thomas Lawrence and a prophecy attributed to the Brahan Seer. She was also responsible for introducing the first evangelical Calvinist preachers to the Isle of Lewis.

Mackenzie was Walter Scott's prototype for Ellen Douglas in his narrative poem "The Lady of the Lake".
