= William Stewart (MP for Kirkcudbright) =

Scottish MP

William Stewart (1737 – 8 October 1797), of Castle Stewart, was a Scottish MP in the British Parliament. He was a member of a junior branch of the family of the Earl of Galloway, being the first son of John Stewart of Castle Stewart.

Stewart was educated at Glasgow University. He was an officer in the 60th Regiment of Foot during the Seven Years' War, leaving the army in 1769 as a Captain.

He represented Wigtown Burghs from 7 May 1770 – 1774 and Kirkcudbright Stewartry in 1774–1780.

Parliament of Great Britain
Preceded by Chauncy Townsend	Member of Parliament for Wigtown Burghs; 1770–1774	Succeeded by William Norton
Preceded by James Murray	Member of Parliament for Kirkcudbright Stewartry; 1774–1780	Succeeded by Peter Johnston
