= Galloway House =

House in Dumfries and Galloway, Scotland

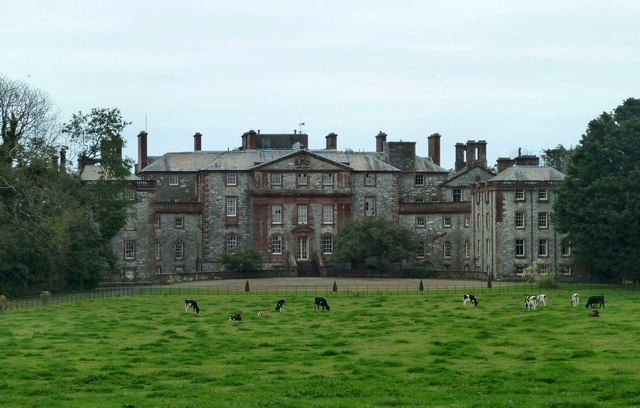
- Galloway House
- Interactive map of Galloway House
- Location: Garlieston, Sorbie, Wigtownshire, Dumfries and Galloway, Scotland, United Kingdom
- Coordinates: 54.77923°N 4.36736°W
- Created: 1740

Designations

Inventory of Gardens and Designed Landscapes in Scotland
- Official name: Galloway House
- Designated: 30 June 1987
- Reference no.: GDL00185

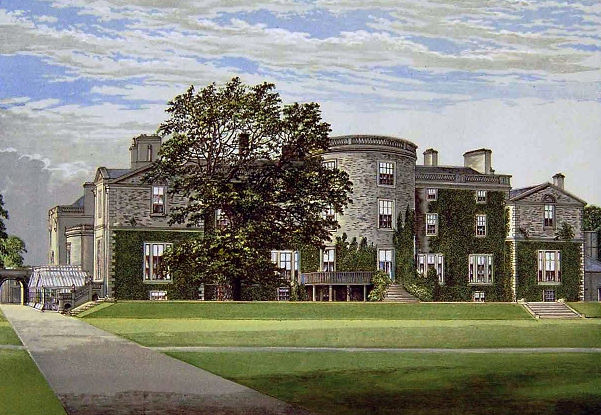
Galloway House, 19th-century lithograph

Galloway House is a Category A listed country house in Sorbie, in the historic county of Wigtownshire in the administrative area of Dumfries and Galloway, Scotland.

== History ==
Adjoining the estate village of Garlieston, on Wigtown Bay, the house was begun in 1740 for Lord Garlies, later sixth Earl of Galloway, to designs by John Douglas, assisted by John Baxter as site architect. Additions in 1841 were by the Edinburgh architect William Burn.

A high wall around the garden was constructed by French prisoners of war c. 1750 or during the Napoleonic Wars.

The house and estate were owned by the Earls of Galloway until 1908, when they were forced to sell up. The buyer was Sir Malcolm McEacharn, who developed the garden. In 1930 the house and park were sold again to Lady Forteviot, widow of John Dewar, 1st Baron Forteviot, of the Dewar's Whisky family. She died in 1940, when the house became a hospital for men injured during the Second World War. Lady Forteviot's step-grandson, Edward Strutt, added to the garden, but in 1947 the house was sold to Glasgow Corporation, and until 1976 was a boarding school. After that it was sold back into private ownership, firstly to an American, and then an Australian. In June 2011 the house was put on the market yet again, with an asking price of £1,500,000 which was reduced to £1,300,000 in 2013 and £595,000 in September 2014.
