= Joshua Henry Mackenzie, Lord Mackenzie =

Scottish lawyer

The Hon. Joshua Henry Mackenzie, Lord Mackenzie (1774–1851) was a 19th-century Scottish lawyer who rose to be a Senator of the College of Justice.

== Early life ==
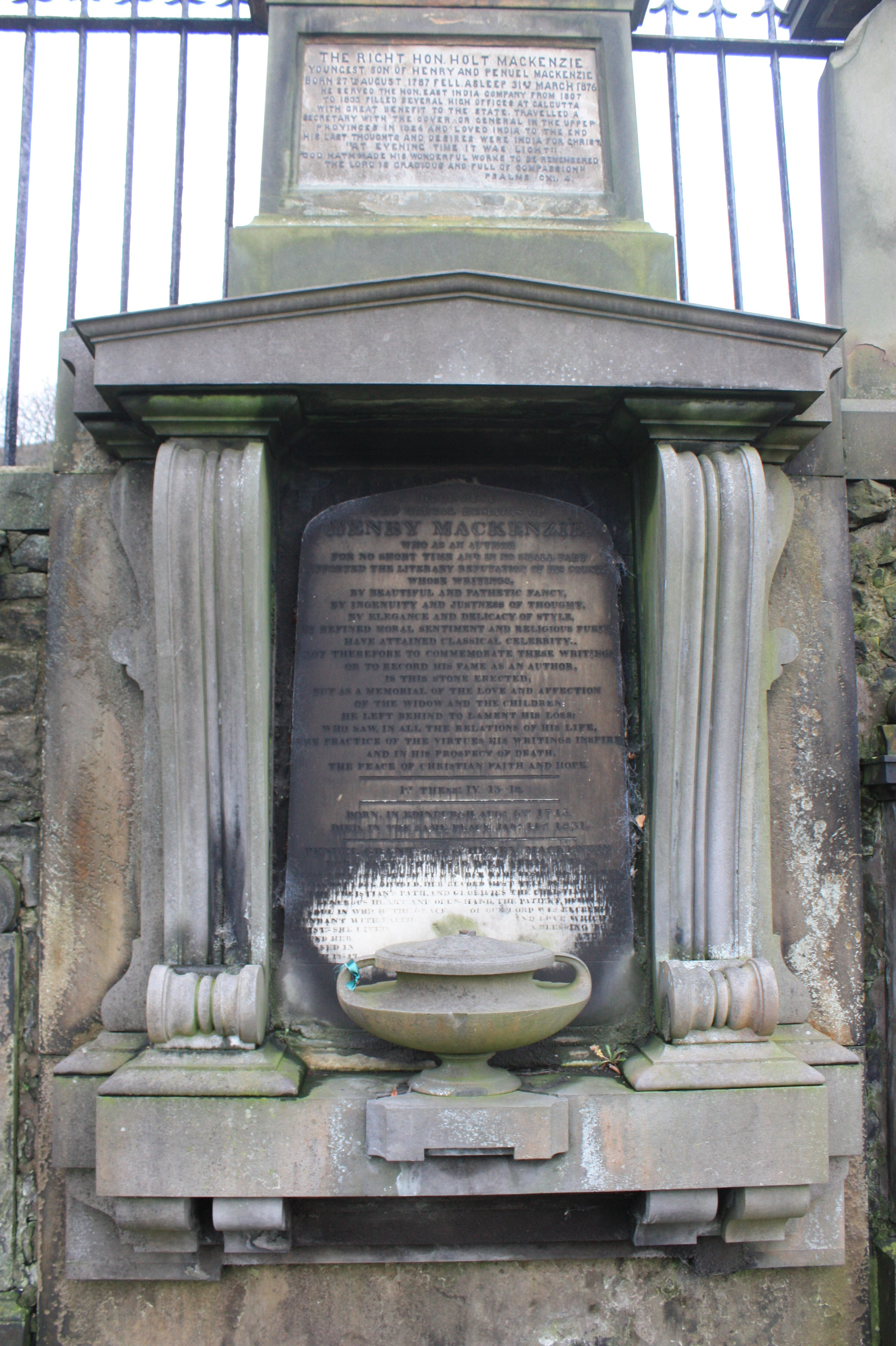
The grave of Joshua Henry MacKenzie, Greyfriars Kirkyard

He was born in 1774 the eldest son of the Edinburgh author Henry Mackenzie and his wife, Penuel Grant. His maternal grandfather was Sir Ludovic Grant. He was named after his paternal grandfather, Dr Joshua Mackenzie. The family lived at Cowgatehead just off the Grassmarket in Edinburgh.

== Career ==
In 1822, he was elected a Senator of the College of Justice taking the seat previously held by the late Lord Kinneder.

== Personal life ==
He married Helen Anne Mackenzie (1799-1866), daughter of Lord Seaforth. Her sister, Mary Elizabeth Frederica Mackenzie, was the wife of Vice Admiral Sir Samuel Hood and James Alexander Stewart of Glasserton. Together, Joshua and Helen were the parents of several children, including:

- Francis Lewis Mackenzie
- Henry Mackenzie
- Frances Mary Mackenzie
- Penuel Augusta Mackenzie.

In 1825, he was living at 6 Royal Circus in Edinburgh's Second New Town. In later life, he moved to Belmont House, a substantial mansion west of the city, near Corstorphine.

He died on 17 November 1851. He is buried with his parents in Greyfriars Kirkyard. The grave lies against the retaining wall mid-way along the northern slope.
