= Alexander Murray (died 1750) =

Scottish politician

Alexander Murray (c. 1680 – 1 May 1750) was a Scottish politician who sat in the British House of Commons from 1715 to 1727.

== Early life and family ==
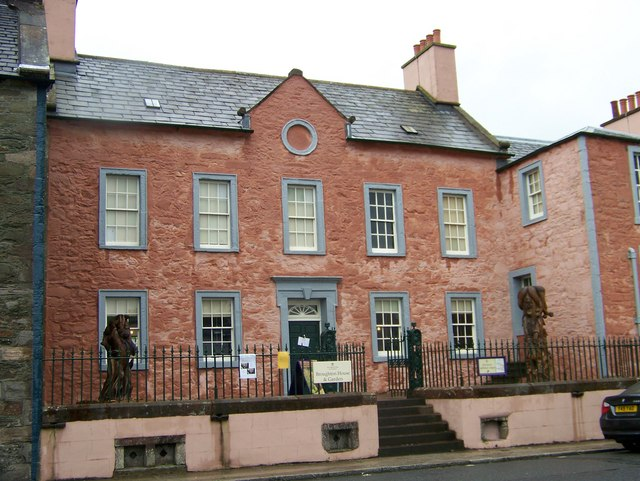
Broughton House, Kirkcudbright

Murray was the second son of Richard Murray of Broughton, in Wigtownshire (a member of the pre-Union Parliament of Scotland) and his wife Anna Lennox, the daughter of Alexander Lennox of Cally. His brother John Murray was also a member of Parliament of Scotland.

In 1726 he married Lady Euphemia Stewart, daughter of the 5th Earl of Galloway. They had one son, James (1727–1799).

Murray inherited extensive estates in Kirkcudbright from his mother. In 1740 he bought Broughton House in High Street, Kirkcudbright as a town house.

== Career ==
At the 1715 general election, Murray elected as the Member of Parliament (MP) for Kirkcudbright Stewartry. He was re-elected unopposed in 1722, but was defeated at the 1727 election.

Parliament of Great Britain
Preceded by John Stewart	Member of Parliament for Kirkcudbright Stewartry; 1715–1727	Succeeded by Patrick Heron
