= James Alexander Stewart-Mackenzie =

British politician

James Stewart-Mackenzie
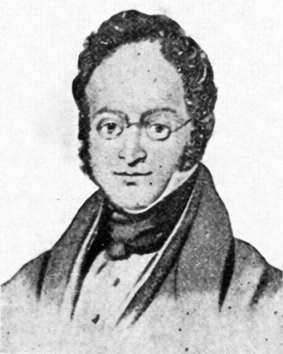

7th Governor of British Ceylon
- In office 7 November 1837 – 15 April 1841
- Monarch: Queen Victoria
- Preceded by: Robert Wilmot-Horton
- Succeeded by: Colin Campbell

Member of Parliament for Ross and Cromarty
- In office 1832–1837
- Preceded by: New constituency
- Succeeded by: Thomas Mackenzie

Member of Parliament for Ross-shire
- In office 1831–1832
- Preceded by: Sir James Wemyss Mackenzie
- Succeeded by: Constituency abolished

Personal details
- Born: James Alexander Stewart; 23 September 1784
- Died: 24 September 1843 (aged 59)
- Spouse: Mary Elizabeth Frederica Mackenzie (m. 1817)
- Relations: Alexander Stewart, 6th Earl of Galloway (grandfather); Ephraim Lópes Pereira d'Aguilar, 2nd Baron d'Aguilar (grandfather)
- Children: 5, including Louisa
- Parent(s): Georgina Isabella d'Aguilar; Keith Stewart

James Alexander Stewart-Mackenzie (23 September 1784 – 24 September 1843) was a Scottish politician and British colonial administrator.

== Early life ==
He was born James Alexander Stewart on 23 September 1784. James was the son of the former Georgina Isabella d'Aguilar and Vice Admiral The Hon. Keith Stewart, who died when he was eleven. His younger brother was Lt. Leveson Douglas Stewart (the father of John Stewart of Nateby Hall). Following his father's death, his mother married secondly, in 1797, Lt.-Col. Richard Fitzgerald, who was killed in action at the Battle of Waterloo.

His paternal grandparents were Alexander Stewart, 6th Earl of Galloway and the former Lady Catherine Cochrane (the youngest daughter of John Cochrane, 4th Earl of Dundonald). His maternal grandfather was Ephraim Lópes Pereira d'Aguilar, 2nd Baron d'Aguilar.

== Career ==
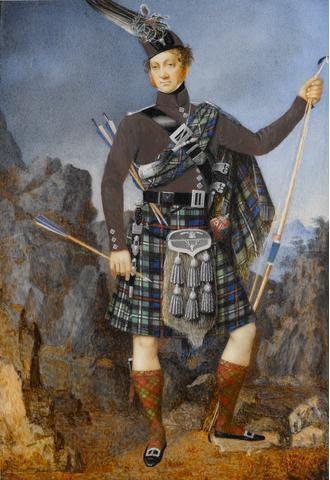
The Rt. Hon. James Alexander Stewart MacKenzie Seaforth and Glasserton (1784-1843)

Stewart-Mackenzie was elected to the House of Commons as Member of Parliament for Ross-shire in 1831. When that constituency was abolished in 1832, he was elected for the new Ross and Cromarty, serving until 1837.

He left the House of Commons to become British governor of Ceylon from March 1837 to 1840, and then Lord High Commissioner of the Ionian Islands (based in Corfu) from December 1840 to 1843.

== Personal life ==
After his marriage on 21 May 1817 to Mary Elizabeth Frederica Mackenzie ("the Hooded Lassie"), widow of Vice Admiral Sir Samuel Hood and daughter of Francis Mackenzie, 1st Baron Seaforth (whose title had become extinct when his four sons all predeceased him), he assumed the additional surname of Mackenzie. Mary's younger sister, Helen Anne Mackenzie, was the wife of Joshua Henry Mackenzie, Lord Mackenzie. In 1819, Stewart-Mackenzie sold the house and grounds of Woodfall Gardens, Glasserton to Stair Hathorn-Stewart at the neighboring Physgill estate. Together, James and Mary were the parents of:

- Keith William Stewart-MacKenzie (1818–1881), who married Hannah Charlotte Hope-Vere, a daughter of James Joseph Hope-Vere and Lady Elizabeth Hay (a daughter George Hay, 7th Marquess of Tweeddale). After her death in 1868, he married Alicia Almira Seymour Bell, daughter of Robert Henry Bell of Bellbrook, in 1871.
- Mary Frances Stewart-Mackenzie (1819–1913), who married Philip Anstruther, son of Col. Robert Anstruther, in 1838.
- Caroline Susan Stewart-Mackenzie (1822–1867), who married John Berney Petre, son of Jack Petre and Hon. Catherine Harbord (daughter of Harbord Harbord, 1st Baron Suffield), in 1844.
- George Augustus Frederick Wellington Stewart-Mackenzie (1824–1852), who married Maria Louisa Marriott, daughter of Lt.-Gen. Thomas Marriott, in 1850.
- Louisa Caroline Stewart-Mackenzie (1827–1903), who married Bingham Baring, 2nd Baron Ashburton.

Stewart-Mackenzie died on 24 September 1843. His widow died on 28 November 1862 and was buried at Fortrose.

=== Descendants ===
Through his eldest son Keith, he was a grandfather of James Alexander Francis Humberston Mackenzie, who was created Baron Seaforth in 1921, and of Mary Jeune, Baroness St Helier, society hostess and politician.

Through his daughter Louisa, he was a grandfather of Hon. Mary Florence Baring (1860–1902), married William Compton, 5th Marquess of Northampton, becoming the Marchioness of Northampton.

Parliament of the United Kingdom
Preceded by Sir James Wemyss Mackenzie	Member of Parliament for Ross-shire; 1831–1832	Constituency abolished
New constituency	Member of Parliament for Ross and Cromarty; 1832–1837	Succeeded by Thomas Mackenzie
Political offices
Preceded by Robert Wilmot-Horton	Governor of Ceylon; 1837–1841	Succeeded by Colin Campbell
