= Louisa Baring, Lady Ashburton =

Scottish art collector and philanthropist (1827–1903)

The Right Honourable The Lady Ashburton

Personal details
- Born: Louisa Caroline Stewart-Mackenzie; 5 March 1827 Stornoway, Isle of Lewis, Scotland
- Died: 2 February 1903 (aged 75) Knightsbridge, London, England
- Spouse: Bingham Baring, 2nd Baron Ashburton (m. 1858; died 1864)
- Relations: William Compton, 6th Marquess of Northampton (grandson)
- Children: Mary Compton, Marchioness of Northampton
- Parent(s): Mary Mackenzie; James Alexander Stewart-Mackenzie

Louisa Caroline Baring, Baroness Ashburton (née Stewart-Mackenzie; 5 March 1827 – 2 February 1903) was a Scottish art collector and philanthropist who had close connections with several artistic and literary figures of the period.

== Early life ==
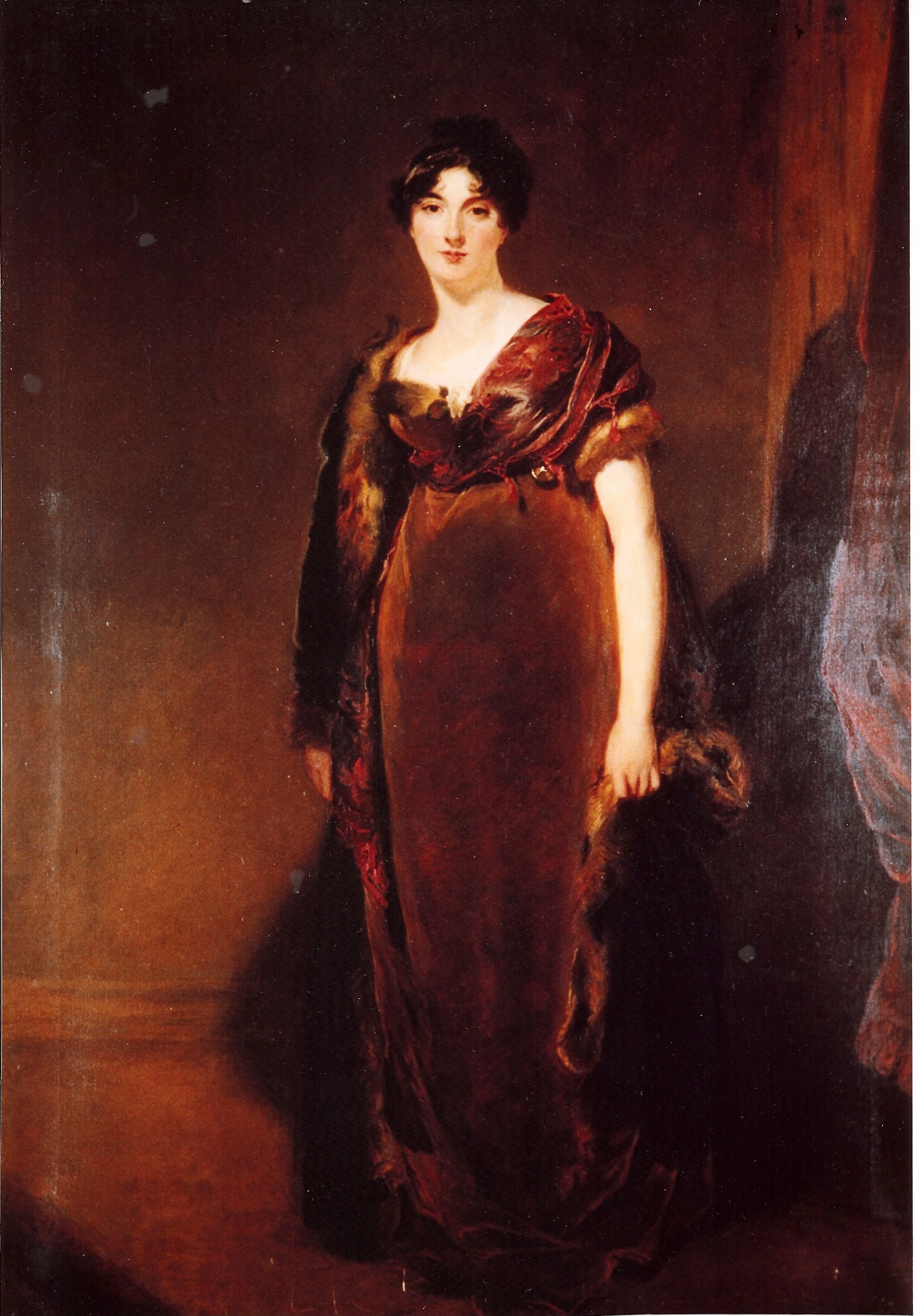
Louisa's mother, Mary Mackenzie, painted by Thomas Lawrence

Louisa Caroline Stewart-Mackenzie was born on 5 March 1827 at Seaforth Lodge, Stornoway, on the Isle of Lewis, Scotland, the youngest daughter and sixth child of James Alexander Stewart-Mackenzie (1784–1843), a Scottish politician and British colonial administrator, and his wife Mary Elizabeth Frederica Mackenzie (1783–1862), known as "The Hooded Lassie". Her name Louisa honoured the isle of her birth. Her early childhood was spent at Brahan Castle near Dingwall, which her mother had inherited from the Seaforth family. In adolescence, she lived in Ceylon (now Sri Lanka), while her father was governor and then in 1841, the family moved to Corfu, Greece, when he became Lord High Commissioner of the Ionian Islands. Upon his death in 1843 the family returned to Brahan Castle, where Louisa lived until her marriage.

Of fiery temper, insatiable restlessness, and socially ambitious, she collected paintings and important friends with an almost manic need. In her youth, Louisa studied drawing with John Ruskin, who saw her as a romantic young girl, with a desperate desire to marry. Among her notable friends were Robert Browning, to whom she at one time unsuccessfully proposed marriage, Thomas Carlyle, Edwin Landseer, whose attentions she rejected, Florence Nightingale and Pauline, Lady Trevelyan.

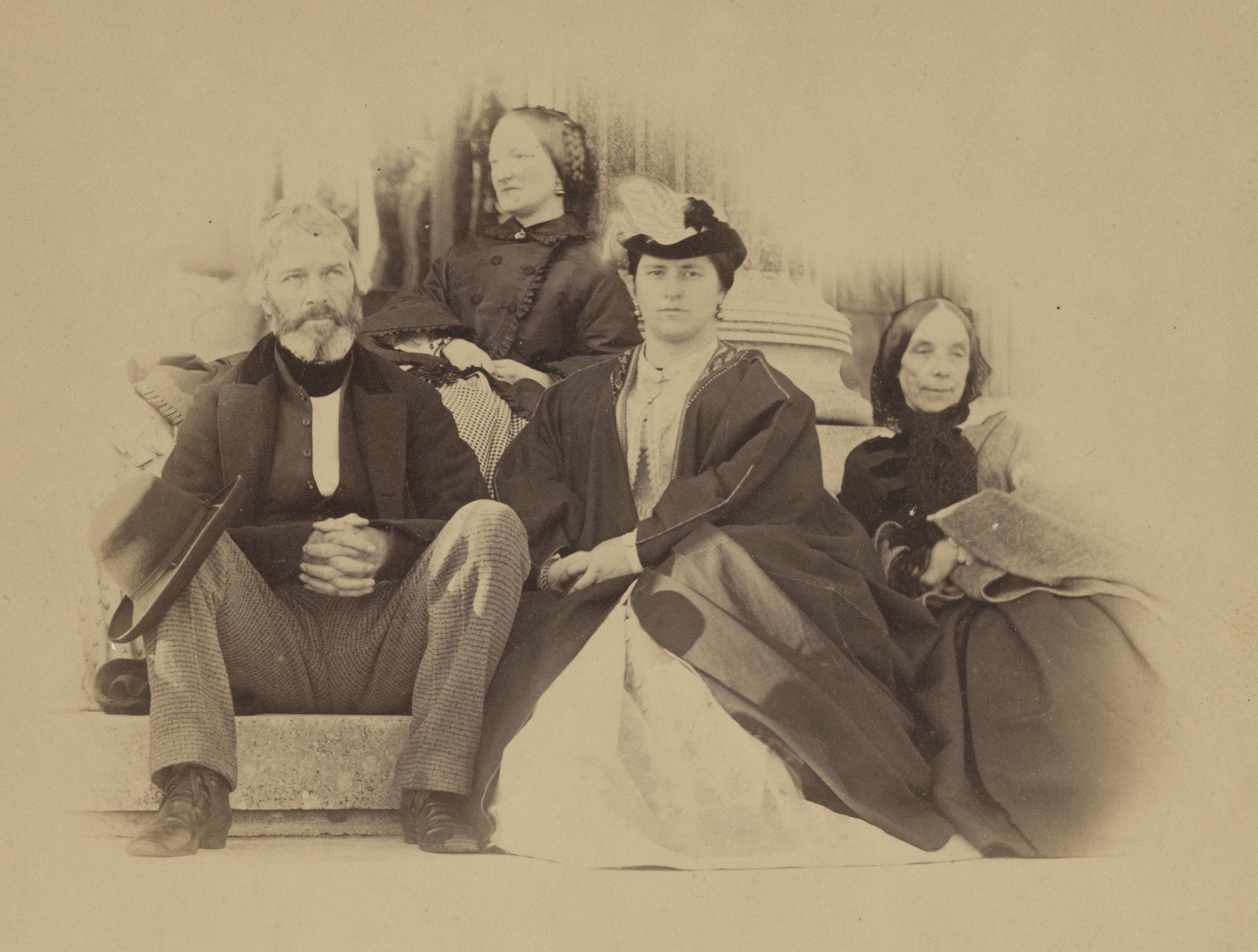
Thomas Carlyle, Lady Ashburton, and Jane Welsh Carlyle with an unidentified woman behind them, taken at The Grange, about 1865

== Art collection ==
Lady Ashburton was known for amassing a large collection of art works and distributing them among her residences at Seaforth Lodge, Melchet Court in Hampshire, and Kent House in Knightsbridge, London. Though no inventory existed, among the known works were sketches, watercolors and sculptures by Rubens, Mantegna, Rossetti, W. L. Leitch, Harriet Hosmer, Edward Lear, G. F. Watts, Marochetti and Titian. When she tired of collecting, Lady Ashburton became an advocate for temperance and a benefactor to several noted charities, including the Ashburton Home of Rest and the Canning Town Mission to Seamen, as well as several clean water initiatives and charitable societies affiliated with religious organizations. The collection was bought by a syndicate of London art dealers in 1907 to be further sold.

== Personal life ==
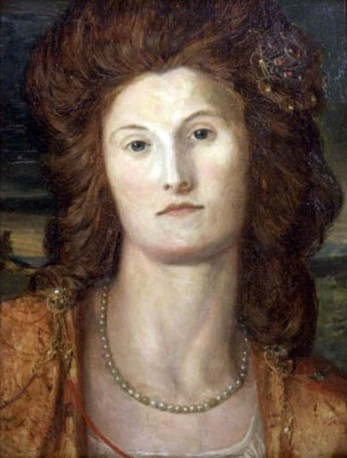
Portrait of Lady Ashburton by George Frederic Watts

On 17 November 1858 Louisa married the widowed Bingham Baring, 2nd Baron Ashburton (1799–1864), a member of the Baring family of merchants and bankers. His first wife, Lady Harriet Mary Montagu (eldest daughter of George Montagu, 6th Earl of Sandwich), had died the previous year. Lord Ashburton and Louisa were the parents of Mary Florence Baring (1860–1902), who was named after Florence Nightingale, who was a close friend of Louisa. Mary married William Compton, 5th Marquess of Northampton, in 1884, becoming the Marchioness of Northampton.

After a year of ill health, Lord Ashburton died in 1864. Lady Ashburton subsequently had an intimate relationship with the American sculptor Harriet Hosmer, whose studio she first came to in the spring of 1867. Hosmer recalled being immediately smitten by Lady Ashburton's "statuesque beauty" and compared her to a goddess, writing, "There was the same square-cut and grandiose features, whose classic beauty was humanized by a pair of keen dark eyes." Lady Ashburton ordered several pieces of Hosmer's work and soon became a patron. The relationship changed from friendship to romance in the spring of 1868 when the two took a trip to Perugia, Italy.

The apparent exclusivity Harriet longed for was threatened by several relationships Louisa had, notably by an approximately three-year involvement with the poet Robert Browning, and by a complicated relationship she had with her daughter's tutor, Margaret Trotter. And no matter how much Harriet liked to consider herself Louisa's "hubby", she, too, had occasional extra-relational involvements.

=== Philanthropy ===
In later life, Lady Ashburton funded a number of buildings with a Christian or social welfare function, including in 1899 Landford Wood Mission Hall, in the village of Landford on the edge of her Melchet Court estate.

=== Death and legacy ===
Lady Ashburton died of breast cancer on 2 February 1903, aged 75, at Kent House, Rutland Gardens, Knightsbridge, London. She is buried at Kinlochluichart Church, Garve, Highland, Scotland.

Her papers, along with those of other members of the Ashburton family have been deposited at the National Library of Scotland. Due to her extensive correspondence with other notable figures, the archive is an important historic collection.
