= Alexander III of Scotland Rescued from the Fury of a Stag by the Intrepidity of Colin Fitzgerald =

Painting by Benjamin West

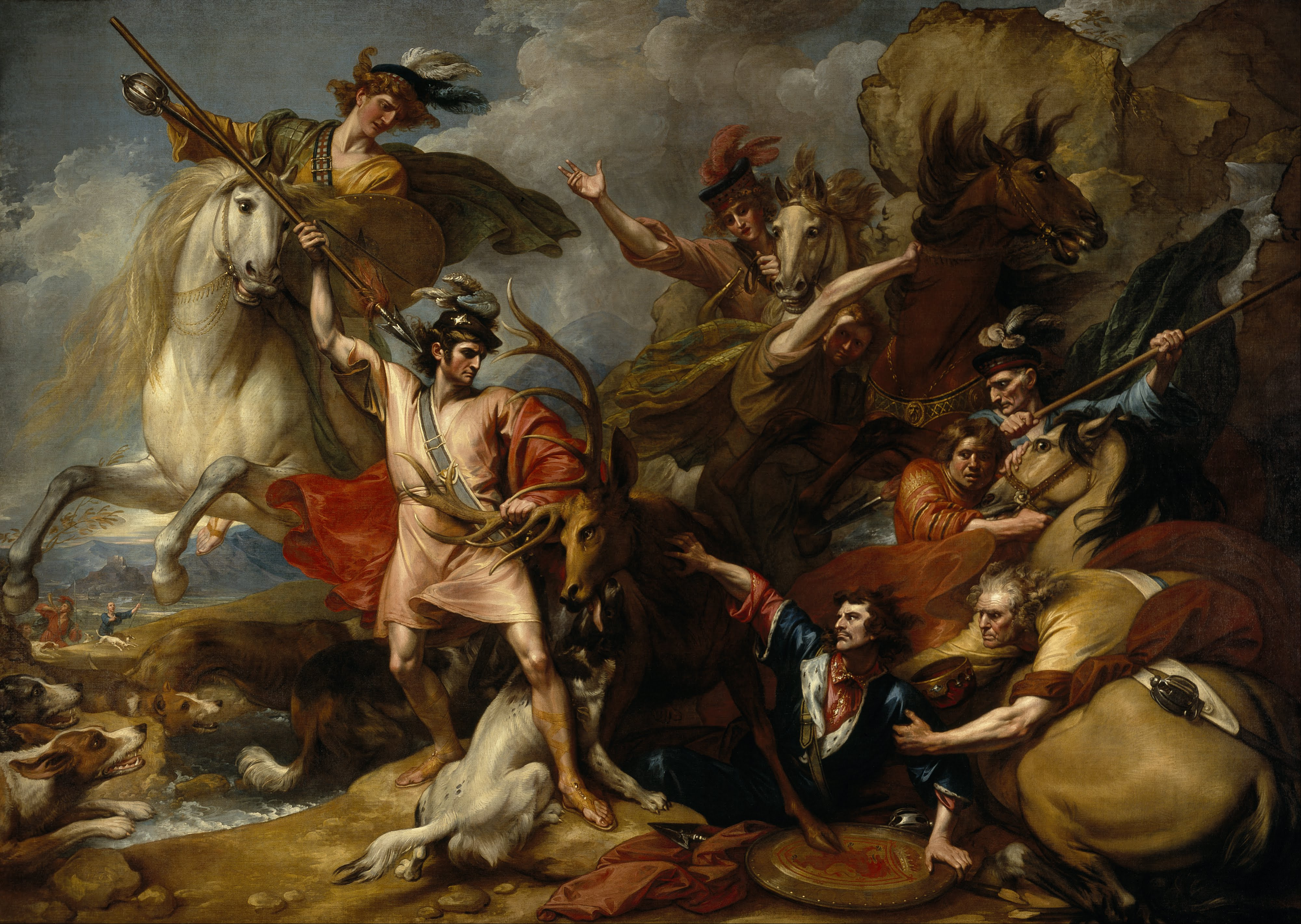
- Artist: Benjamin West
- Year: 1786
- Type: Oil on canvas, history painting
- Dimensions: 366 cm × 521 cm (144 in × 205 in)
- Location: Scottish National Gallery, Edinburgh

Alexander III of Scotland Rescued from the Fury of a Stag by the Intrepidity of Colin Fitzgerald is a 1786 history painting by the Anglo-American artist Benjamin West. It depicts a legendary scene in Scottish history in which the life of Alexander III of Scotland was saved during a hunting expedition from an attack by a stag by Colin Fitzgerald, who founded the Highland Clan Mackenzie. West was a noted American-born painter who settled in London in the 1760s and later went on to serve as the second president of the Royal Academy.

It was exhibited at the Royal Academy's annual exhibition at Somerset House in 1786, an earlier drawing sketch had appeared at the 1784 Exhibition. It was commissioned by Francis Mackenzie who in 1783 had succeeded as Clan Chief and wished to commemorate his legendary ancestor. Today it is in the Scottish National Gallery in Edinburgh, having been purchased in 1987. It is the largest painting in the collection.

== Bibliography ==
- Clifford, Timothy, Gallagher, Michael & Smailes, Helen. Benjamin West and The Death of the Stag: The Story Behind the Painting and Its Conservation. National Galleries of Scotland, 2009
- Dillenberger, John. Benjamin West. Trinity University Press, 1977.
- MacLeod. Anne. From an Antique Land: Visual Representations of the Highlands and Islands 1700-1880. Birlinn, 2012
- Myrone, Martin. Bodybuilding: Reforming Masculinities in British Art 1750-1810. Yale University Press, 2005.
- Reid, Norman H. Alexander III, 1249-1286: First Among Equals. Birlinn, 2019.
