= Francis Mackenzie, 1st Baron Seaforth =

British Army general

Lieutenant-General The Right Honourable The Lord Seaforth FRS FRSE FLS
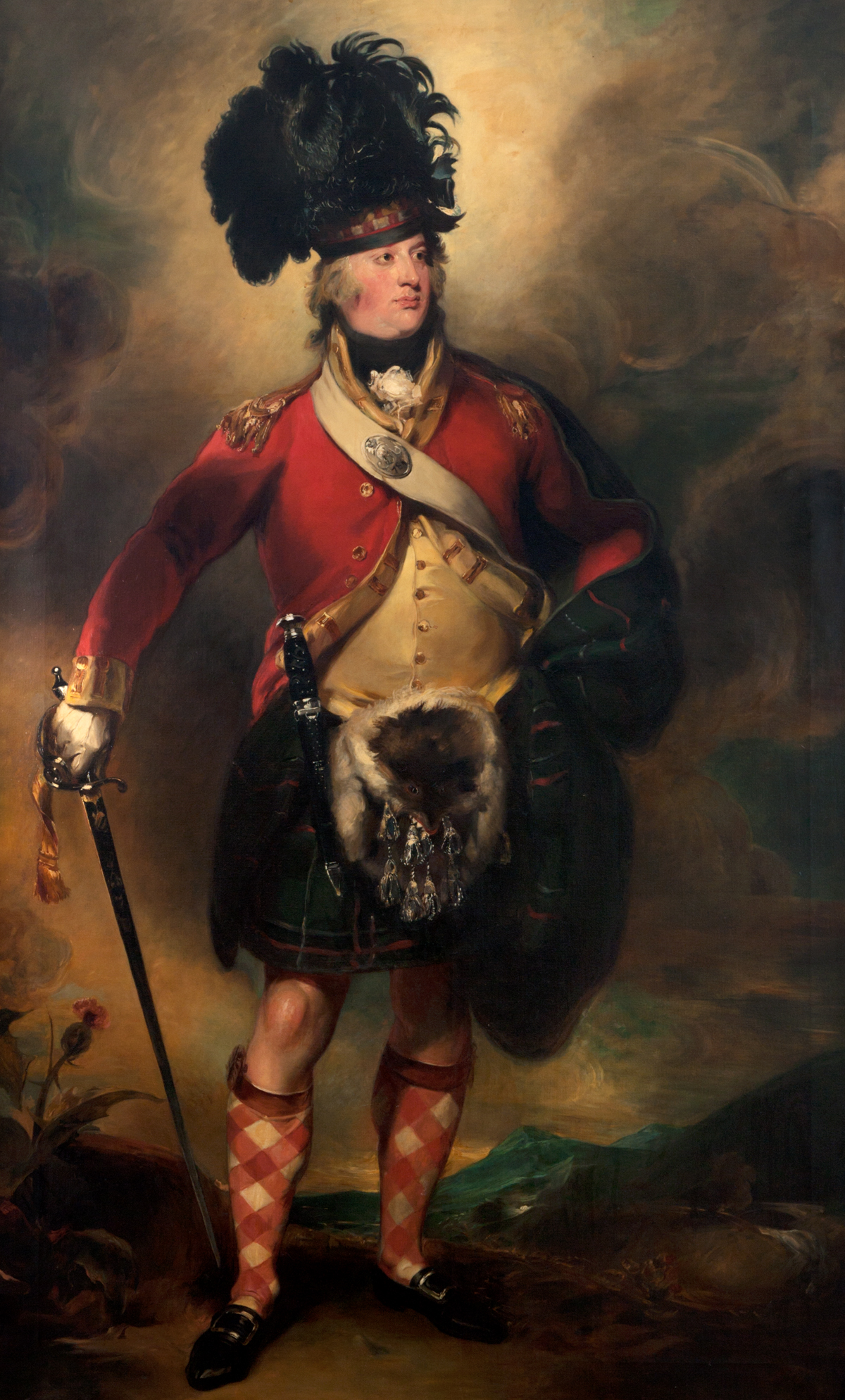
- Portrait by Sir Thomas Lawrence
- Born: 9 June 1754
- Died: 11 January 1815 (aged 60)
- Military career
- Allegiance: United Kingdom
- Branch: British Army
- Rank: Lieutenant-General
- Conflicts: French Revolutionary Wars

Lord Seaforth by Thomas Lawrence, Figge Art Museum, Davenport IA, USA

Lieutenant-General Francis Humberston Mackenzie, 1st Baron Seaforth, FRS, FRSE, FLS (9 June 1754 – 11 January 1815) was a British politician, soldier, and botanist. He was Chief of the Highland Clan Mackenzie, as which he raised the renowned 78th (Highlanders) Regiment of Foot.

== Early life ==
Mackenzie was the second son of Major William Mackenzie (d. 12 March 1770), who was the son of the Hon. Alexander Mackenzie, and the grandson of Kenneth Mackenzie, 4th Earl of Seaforth. Francis's mother was Mary, the daughter and heiress of Matthew Humberston of Humberston, Lincolnshire.

On the death of his elder brother Colonel Thomas Frederick Mackenzie Humberston in 1783, Francis Mackenzie became the last male heir of the attainted Earls of Seaforth. When he was about twelve years of age, Francis contracted scarlet fever, which incurred the loss of his ability to hear and almost all of his ability to speak. As a consequence, he was known as MacCoinnich Bodhar (Deaf Mackenzie in Gaelic).

== Political and military career ==
From 1784 to 1790, and again from 1794 to 1796, Seaforth was Member of Parliament for the County of Ross.

In 1787, he proposed raising a regiment on his own estates, with himself as commander. The government declined his patriotic offer but accepted his services in procuring recruits for the 74th and 75th. On 19 May 1790, he renewed his offer, yet the government declined his services again. When war broke out in 1793, he offered for a third time, and a letter of service was granted in his favour dated 7 March 1793, empowering him as Lieutenant-Colonel-Commandant to raise a Highland Battalion to be called the 78th (Highlanders) Regiment of Foot.

He was appointed Lord Lieutenant of Ross-shire and was raised to the peerage of Great Britain as Lord Seaforth, Baron Mackenzie of Kintail in the County of Ross on 26 October 1797. In 1798, he was appointed Colonel of the Ross-shire Regiment of Militia.

Seaforth served as Governor of Barbados from 1800 to 1806. During his tenure he reformed slavery on the island, implemented a prohibition on killing slaves, and reduced official discrimination against free blacks. As Governor of Barbados, Seaforth appointed Thomas Moody, a mathematical expert from a British landed gentry family who taught at Codrington College, to a direct commission in the Royal Engineers, which Moody entered as a lieutenant in 1806. Seaforth attained the rank of lieutenant-general in 1808.

== Avocational life ==
In 1794, Seaforth was elected a Fellow of the Royal Society for his contributions to botany, with the genus Seaforthia named in recognition of his work. A year later, In 1795, he was elected a Fellow of the Royal Society of Edinburgh, again in acknowledgement of his contributions to botany: his proposers were Daniel Rutherford, Alexander Monro (secundus), and John Playfair. He was also a Fellow of the Linnean Society, and served as Extraordinary Director of the Highland Society.

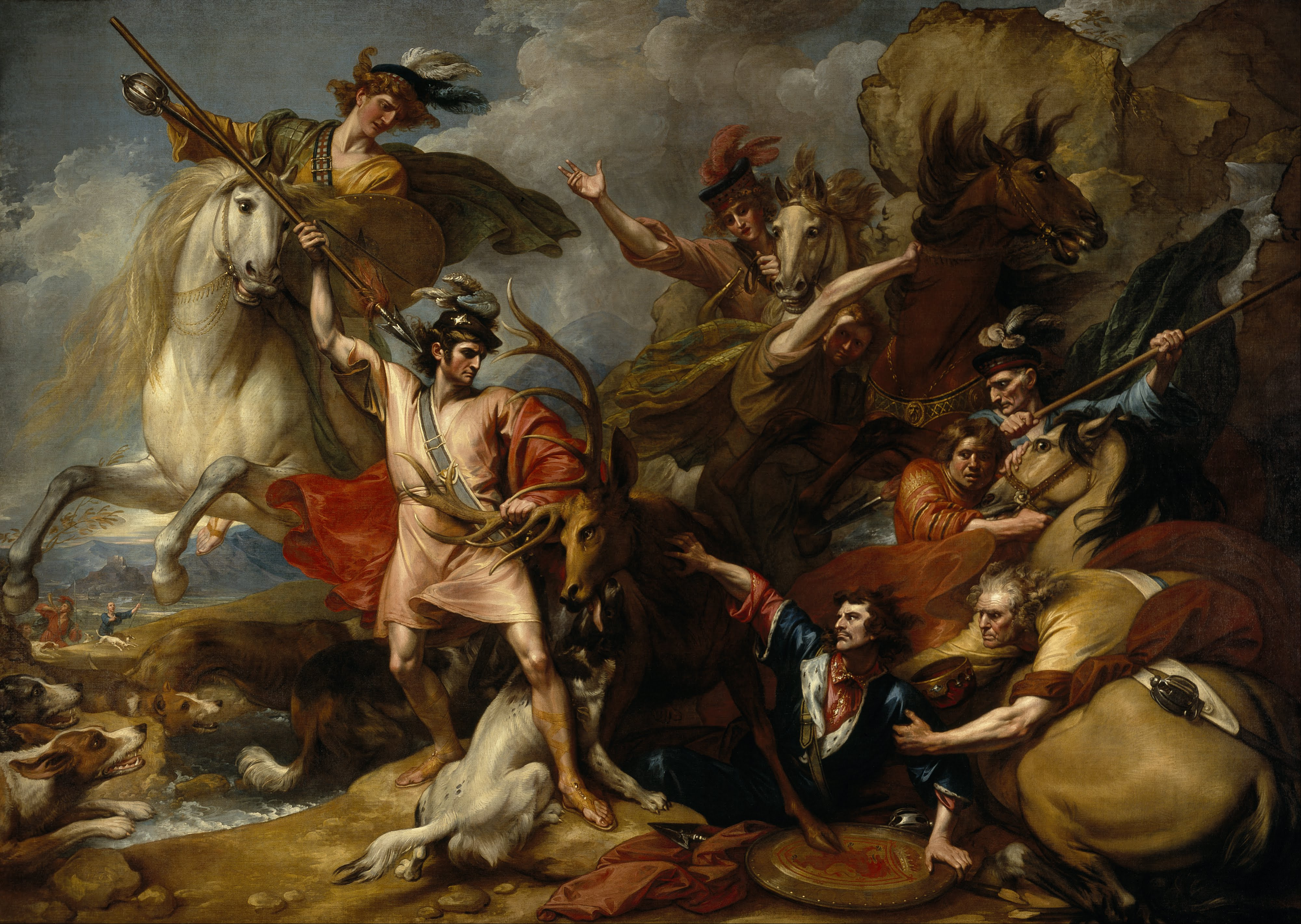
Alexander III of Scotland Rescued from the Fury of a Stag by the Intrepidity of Colin Fitzgerald by Benjamin West, 1786

In 1796, Mackenzie gave £1,000 to Sir Thomas Lawrence to assist with Lawrence's financial difficulties. Lawrence later painted a full-length portrait of Seaforth's daughter, Mary.

Lord Seaforth commissioned Benjamin West's 1786 painting Alexander III of Scotland Rescued from the Fury of a Stag by the Intrepidity of Colin Fitzgerald.

Walter Scott said of him:

The last Baron of Kintail, Francis, Lord Seaforth was a nobleman of extraordinary talents, who must have made for himself a lasting reputation had not his political exertions been checked by painful natural infirmities.

Seaforth nearly recovered entirely the use of his tongue, but during the last two years of his life, which he spent mourning the deaths of his four sons, he rarely spoke.

== Family ==
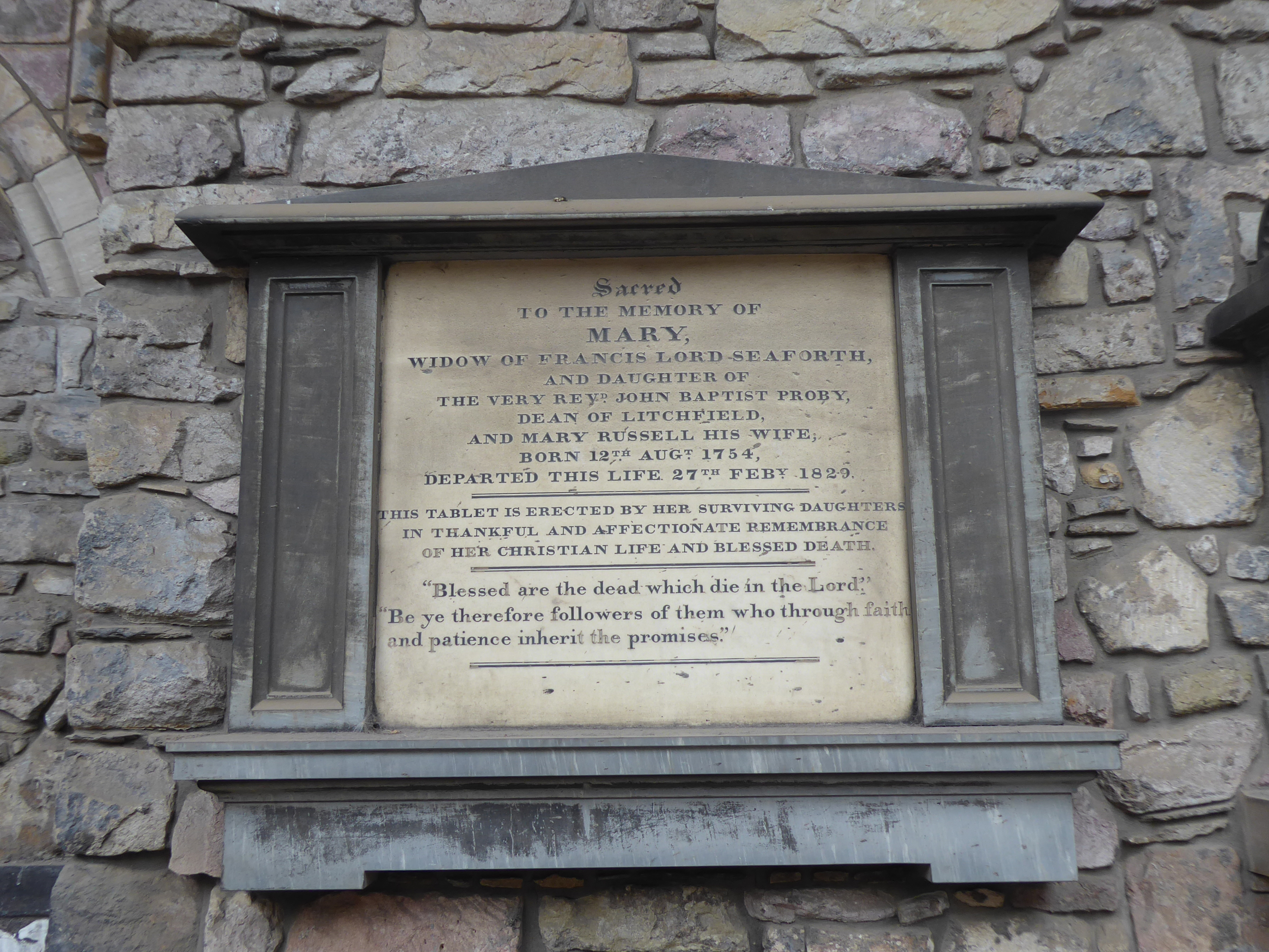
The grave of Mary Proby, Lady Seaforth, Holyrood Abbey

In 1782, Mackenzie married Mary Proby, the daughter of The Very Rev Baptist Proby who had served as the 7th Dean of Lichfield, and of Mary Russel. Mary Proby was the niece of John Proby, 1st Baron Carysfort and the sister of Rev. Charles Proby.

Francis's four legitimate sons all predeceased him, as had been predicted by the Brahan Seer. His children were:

- William Frederick Mackenzie (died young)
- George Leveson Boucherat Mackenzie (died young)
- Hon. William Frederick Mackenzie (died 1814), MP for Ross-shire
- Hon. Francis John Mackenzie, midshipman, RN (died unmarried 1813)
- Hon. Mary Elizabeth Frederica Mackenzie, heiress to her father, (married first Admiral Sir Samuel Hood; married second Rt Hon James Alexander Stewart of Glasserton).
- Frances Catherine Mackenzie
- Caroline Elizabeth Mackenzie (accidentally killed unmarried)
- Charlotte Elizabeth Mackenzie (died unmarried)
- Augusta Anne Mackenzie (died unmarried in 1856) buried in Dean Cemetery
- Helen Anne Mackenzie (married Joshua Henry Mackenzie, Lord Mackenzie) (buried in Greyfriars Kirkyard)

== Sources ==
- Mackenzie, Alexander (1894). History of the Mackenzies. Inverness: A & W Mackenzie.
- Sidney Lee (ed), Dictionary of National Biography (1891), London, Smith, Elder & Co

Military offices
New regiment	Colonel of the 78th (Highlanders) Regiment of Foot; 1793–1796	Succeeded by Alexander Mackenzie Fraser
Parliament of Great Britain
Preceded by John Mackenzie	Member of Parliament for Ross-shire; 1784–1790	Succeeded by William Adam
Preceded by William Adam	Member of Parliament for Ross-shire; 1794–1796	Succeeded by Sir Charles Lockhart-Ross
Government offices
Preceded by William Bishop, acting	Governor of Barbados and [Governor of Demerara] 1802–1806	Succeeded by John Spooner, acting
Honorary titles
New title	Lord Lieutenant of Ross-shire; 1794–1815	Succeeded by Sir Hector Mackenzie
Peerage of Great Britain
New creation	Baron Seaforth; 1797–1815	Extinct
Preceded by Thomas Frederick Mackenzie Humberston	Chief of Clan Mackenzie; 1783–1815	disputed
