= Keith Stewart =

Royal Navy officer and politician

Vice-Admiral The Honourable Keith Stewart

Member of Parliament for Wigtown Burghs
- In office February 1762 – March 1762
- Preceded by: Archibald Montgomerie
- Succeeded by: John Hamilton

Member of Parliament for Wigtownshire
- In office 1768–1784
- Preceded by: James Murray
- Succeeded by: Andrew McDouall

Personal details
- Born: 1739
- Died: 3 March 1795 (aged 56) Dumfries
- Spouse: Georgina Isabella d'Aguilar
- Parent(s): Alexander Stewart, 6th Earl of Galloway; Lady Catherine Cochrane

Military service
- Branch/service: Royal Navy
- Years of service: c.1753–1795
- Rank: Vice-Admiral
- Commands: HMS Speedwell; HMS Lynx; HMS Lively; HMS Montreal; HMS Berwick; North Sea Command; HMS Cambridge; HMS Formidable
- Battles/wars: Seven Years' War; Invasion of Guadeloupe; American Revolutionary War; Battle of Dogger Bank; Battle of Cape Spartel

Vice-Admiral Keith Stewart (1739 – 3 March 1795) was a Royal Navy officer and politician who sat in the House of Commons on two occasions. Having begun his naval career in around 1753, Stewart was promoted to commander in 1761 and then advanced to post-captain in 1762 because of political negotiations undertaken by his father Alexander Stewart, 6th Earl of Galloway. Stewart commanded HMS Berwick at the Battle of Ushant in 1778 and in 1781 was appointed Commander-in-Chief, North Sea only to be superseded by Hyde Parker soon afterwards. As such he served at the Battle of Dogger Bank as a volunteer on Berwick.

Resuming his command in the North Sea after the battle, Stewart resigned his position towards the start of 1782 when he failed to stop a Dutch convoy escaping him in the Downs. Instead given command of HMS Cambridge, he served at the Relief of Gibraltar and the subsequent Battle of Cape Spartel. Apart from a very brief command of HMS Formidable Stewart saw no further service after 1783, but was promoted to rear-admiral in 1790 and vice-admiral in 1794. An active politician when not at sea, Stewart served as member of parliament for Wigtownshire from 1768 to 1784, generally as a supporter of the government. He resigned to take up post as receiver general of land tax in Scotland, a position he held for the remainder of his life.

== Early life ==
Keith Stewart was born in 1739, the fourth son of Alexander Stewart, 6th Earl of Galloway and Lady Catherine Cochrane, who was the youngest daughter of John Cochrane, 4th Earl of Dundonald. The second surviving son, his elder brother John would go on to inherit the family earldom.

== Naval career ==
=== First commands ===
Stewart joined the Royal Navy in around 1753. He was promoted to lieutenant on 2 January 1759 and appointed as the fourth lieutenant of the 64-gun ship of the line HMS Nassau. He subsequently served at the invasion of Guadeloupe later in the year. He departed Nassau on 25 August, and did not see active service again until 11 February 1761 when he was promoted to commander. At the same time he was given command of the out of commission 8-gun sloop HMS Speedwell, in which he stayed until 4 March when he transferred to the brand new 10-gun sloop HMS Lynx. In Lynx he served in the Downs, and in August the ship formed part of the naval escort that brought Charlotte of Mecklenburg-Strelitz to England for her marriage to George III, arriving at Harwich on 6 September.

Stewart was promoted to post-captain on 7 April the following year because of a demand from his father as part of political negotiations, but the historians Brian Vale and Griffith Edwards note that Stewart was also a highly competent seaman and not himself overtly ambitious. He was appointed to the 20-gun post ship HMS Lively. He commanded the ship on the West Indies Station until the end of the Seven Years' War. Stewart then sailed to the North America Station before returning to Britain. After a period of service in British waters, in June 1763 he went out in Lively to the Mediterranean Sea.

Around this time Stewart also became the first patron of William Bligh, who would occasionally serve under him throughout his career. Stewart commanded in the Mediterranean until Lively was paid off on 21 February 1765 for extensive repairs. On 16 March he was instead given command of the 32-gun frigate HMS Montreal, also in the Mediterranean, in which he continued until 6 March the following year.

=== American Revolutionary War ===
Stewart was not given another command for a considerable period of time after this, choosing instead to focus on his political career. This situation changed with the start of the American Revolutionary War, and he was appointed to command the brand new 74-gun ship of the line HMS Berwick on 27 December 1777. Serving in the English Channel, he fought at the Battle of Ushant on 27 July the following year. Stationed in the vanguard division of the British fleet, Berwick was heavily engaged during the battle and had ten men killed. Afterwards Berwick continued to serve in the English Channel, and was part of the fleet that relieved Guernsey in September 1779.

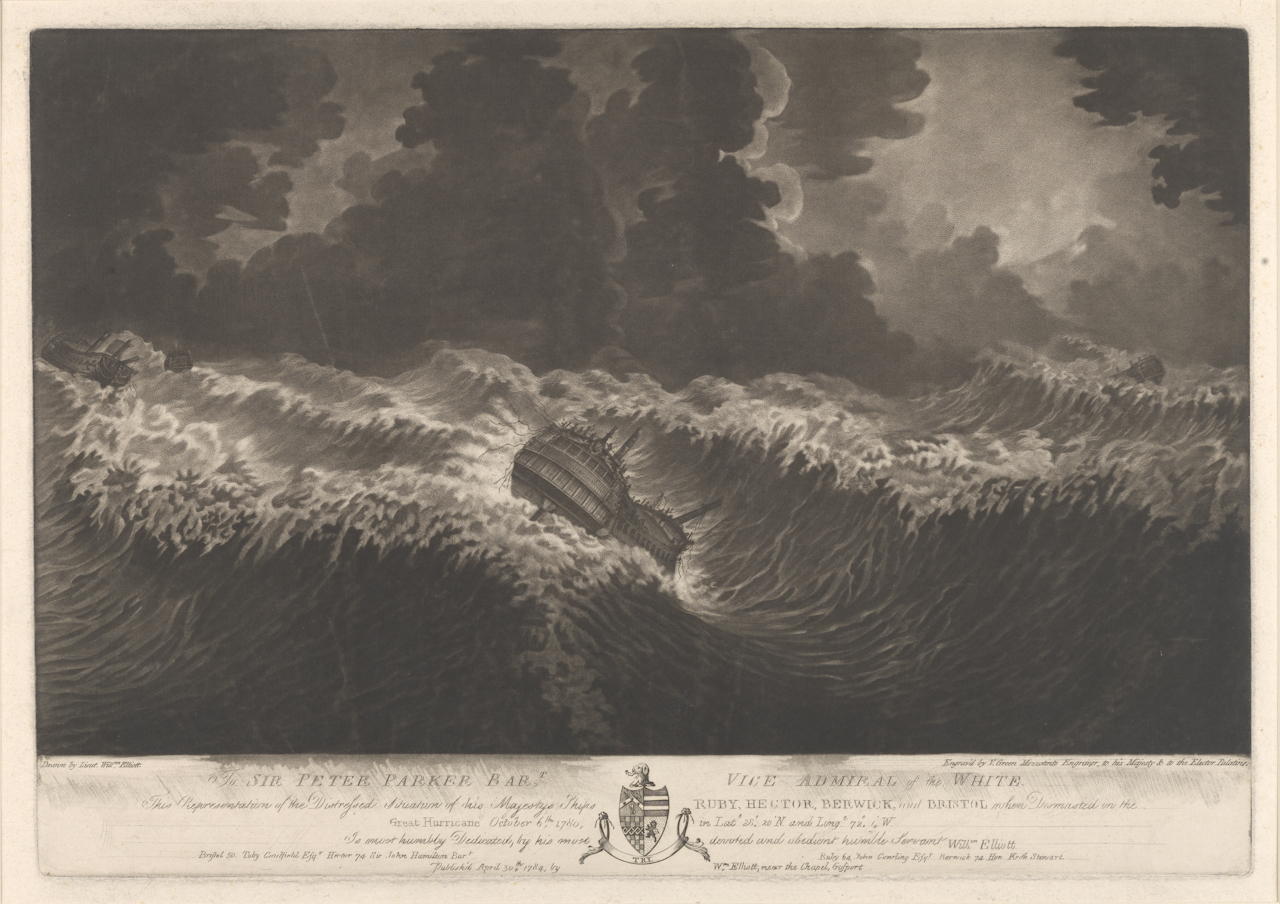
Berwick and three other warships pictured dismasted during the Great Hurricane

While Berwick was still at sea disagreements between the two commanders of the British at Ushant, Admiral Augustus Keppel and Vice-Admiral Sir Hugh Palliser, had led to political controversy. The First Lord of the Admiralty at the time, John Montagu, 4th Earl of Sandwich, specifically noted that:

Captain Stewart behaved exceedingly well in the action, is a very good officer and has kept himself clear of disputes of every kind, and shown no particular attachments.

With his ship having received a refit in December, Stewart was sent with Berwick to the West Indies on 8 April 1780, in a force commanded by Commodore Robert Boyle-Walsingham. Serving at Jamaica from 12 July, Berwick was one of many ships to be heavily damaged in the October Great Hurricane of 1780 and Stewart ran from the storm with his ship jury rigged, reaching Britain in December.

Berwick was repaired in a refit that was completed in February 1781, and Stewart was subsequently appointed a commodore and Commander-in-Chief, North Sea, on 27 March. Based out of Leith, Berwick and the 32-gun frigate HMS Belle Poule captured the French 32-gun privateer Calonne off the Firth of Forth on 16 April. Stewart's force was however not large enough to defend against the squadron the Dutch were forming to oppose it, and Vice-Admiral Hyde Parker was sent out with reinforcements in July. In Parker's force was the 64-gun ship of the line HMS Bienfaisant whose commander, Captain Richard Brathwaite, was senior in rank to Stewart. This forced Stewart to relinquish his position as commodore, but direct command of Berwick continued with Stewart's ex flag captain, Captain John Fergusson, and Stewart was only able to stay on in Parker's fleet as a volunteer.

Stewart was present as such at the Battle of Dogger Bank, fought on 5 August, where Berwick led the British line of battle against the Dutch and was heavily damaged. Afterwards Parker resigned his command in the North Sea and Brathwaite also left the station, leaving Stewart able to re-hoist his broad pennant as commodore in September. Employed in the blockade of Dutch ports, towards the start of 1782 he failed to stop a Dutch convoy from escaping him while in the Downs, and after criticism of his actions he resigned his command in around March.

The Relief of Gibraltar, 11 October 1782

Stewart was then given command of the 80-gun ship of the line HMS Cambridge, in the Channel Fleet, on 17 June. His crew from Berwick were also transferred for this. The fleet was subsequently sent to relieve the Great Siege of Gibraltar, which it did as escort to a convoy. After this it fought the Battle of Cape Spartel on 20 October, with Cambridge serving as one of the seconds to Vice-Admiral Mark Milbanke's flagship the 90-gun ship of the line HMS Ocean. Stewart's ship had four men killed during the engagement, after which the fleet returned to England.

=== Later service and flag rank ===
Cambridge was sent in for a refit prior to a planned sailing to join the West Indies Station, but this was still in progress when the American Revolutionary War came to an end in 1783, at which time the posting was cancelled and the ship paid off. Stewart himself is recorded as leaving the command on 30 December the previous year. He did not receive a new ship until 10 May 1790 when an expectation of a new war with Spain led to an armament, with Stewart appointed to command the 98-gun ship of the line HMS Formidable. It was planned that the ship would serve in the English Channel, but soon after this the prospect of war diminished and Stewart relinquished command.

Stewart was raised to flag rank as a rear-admiral on 21 September the same year, and was further promoted to vice-admiral on 12 April 1794. He was not employed again within the Royal Navy after this, and died at his home near Dumfries on 3 March 1795, aged 56.

== Political career ==
Stewart's father had intended for him to enter parliament from a young age, but at the 1761 British general election Stewart was still serving in the West Indies and so Galloway sponsored the election of Stewart's cousins James Murray and Archibald Montgomerie instead. On 19 February 1762 Stewart replaced Montgomerie as member of parliament (MP) for Wigtown Burghs, but in March he gave up the seat as part of compromises being made by his father over the family's political control. In return for acceding to this Stewart received his promotion to post-captain.

Later returning to his political career and having settled in Glasserton, in 1768 Stewart became MP for Wigtownshire. Following the political lead of his brother-in-law Granville Leveson-Gower, 2nd Earl Gower, he was known as a firm supporter of the incumbent administrations, with the biographer John Charnock describing him as an "inflexible supporter of every measure proposed". This assisted him in gaining appointments in his naval career. He supported Augustus FitzRoy, 3rd Duke of Grafton and then Frederick North, Lord North, opposing the government only once when on 9 February 1773 he supported a petition from naval captains.

Stewart was also given the salary of the receiver general of land tax in Scotland in 1773; this position could not be held by an MP and so another man officially held it while Stewart collected the salary. In 1783 the salary was instead given to Murray. Stewart continued to support government when William Pitt the Younger came to power, but in 1784 he learned that he would again be appointed to the salary of the receiver general. Wanting to truly take up the position, at the 1784 British general election he gave up his seat to his opponent, Andrew McDouall, with the understanding that Stewart could return to Wigtownshire if he ever lost the receivership. With this completed in July, Stewart appointed a deputy to work as receiver general and instead focused on his estates and various coal and iron mines, being both an agricultural improver and mineral developer. He continued as receiver general until his death, using the income to make loans to expanding industrialists.

== Personal life ==
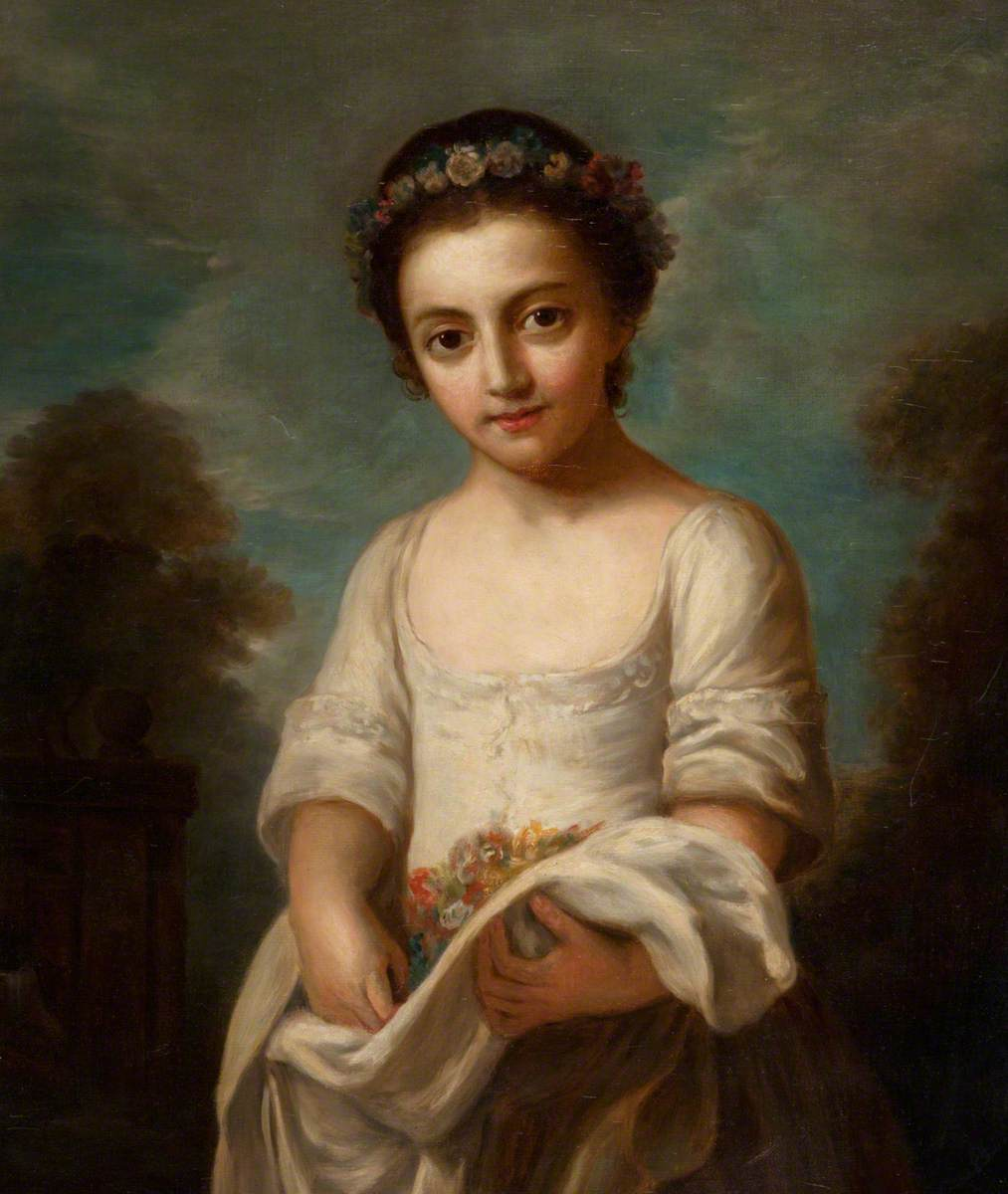
Portrait of a young Georgina Isabella D'Aguilar, framed at her marriage to Stewart

Stewart married Georgina Isabella d'Aguilar, daughter of Ephraim Lópes Pereira d'Aguilar, 2nd Baron d'Aguilar, on 13 May 1782, taking a brief period of leave from naval service to do so. Together the couple had four sons:

- Archibald Keith Stewart (d. 24 June 1795), a Royal Navy midshipman on board HMS Queen Charlotte who drowned while looking at shot holes after the Battle of Groix.
- James Alexander Stewart-Mackenzie (1784–1843), who married Mary, Lady Hood. After their marriage he assumed the additional surname of Mackenzie.
- Leveson Douglas Stewart (1786–1819), a Royal Navy lieutenant who married Elizabeth Dalrymple-Hay, daughter of Sir John Dalrymple-Hay, 1st Baronet.
- A son (died 1807), a Royal Navy officer who drowned in service.

== Citations ==
Parliament of Great Britain
Preceded by Archibald Montgomerie	Member of Parliament for Wigtown Burghs; 1762	Succeeded by John Hamilton
Preceded by James Murray	Member of Parliament for Wigtownshire; 1768–1784	Succeeded by Andrew McDouall
