= Alexander Stewart, 6th Earl of Galloway =

Scottish aristocrat

The Right Honourable The Earl of Galloway
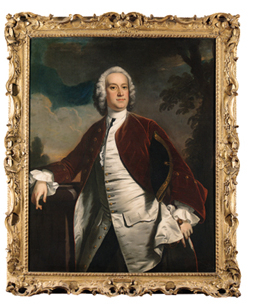
- painting by Thomas Hudson, 1749.

Grand Master of the Grand Lodge of Scotland
- In office 1757–1759
- Preceded by: Lord Aberdour
- Succeeded by: The Earl of Leven

Personal details
- Born: Alexander Stewart c. 1694
- Died: 24 September 1773 (aged 78–79)
- Spouses: Lady Anne Keith (m. 1719; died 1728) Lady Catherine Cochrane (m. 1729)
- Relations: Alexander Montgomerie, 9th Earl of Eglinton (grandfather)
- Children: 12, including John Stewart, 7th Earl of Galloway, Keith Stewart, Susanna Leveson-Gower, Marchioness of Stafford
- Parent(s): James Stewart, 5th Earl of Galloway; Lady Catherine Montgomerie

Alexander Stewart, 6th Earl of Galloway (c. 1694 – 24 September 1773) was a Scottish aristocrat.

== Early life ==
Alexander was the eldest son of Lady Catherine Montgomerie and James Stewart, 5th Earl of Galloway, a Commissioner of the Scottish Treasury and Privy Councillor of Scotland who opposed the Union between England and Scotland. He had three younger brothers, Lt.-Gen. Hon. James Stewart (an MP for Wigtown Burghs and Wigtownshire), Capt. Hon. William Stewart (also an MP for Wigtown Burghs), and Hon. George Stewart, who died while a student at Edinburgh University. His sisters included Lady Margaret Stewart (wife of James Carnegie, 5th Earl of Southesk and John St Clair, Master of Sinclair, eldest son and heir apparent of Henry St Clair, 10th Lord Sinclair) and Lady Euphemia Stewart (wife of Alexander Murray of Broughton).

His paternal grandparents were Alexander Stewart, 3rd Earl of Galloway and the former Lady Mary Douglas (eldest daughter of James Douglas, 2nd Earl of Queensberry and Lady Margaret Stewart, eldest daughter of John Stewart, 1st Earl of Traquair). His maternal grandparents were Alexander Montgomerie, 9th Earl of Eglinton and Lady Margaret Cochrane (sister of John Cochrane, 2nd Earl of Dundonald).

== Career ==
In 1740, the then Lord Garlies, began work on what became Galloway House which adjoined the estate village of Garlieston, on Wigtown Bay. The home was designed by John Douglas, who was assisted by John Baxter as site architect. Around 1750 or during the Napoleonic Wars, a high wall around the garden was constructed by French prisoners of war.

He succeeded to the earldom upon his father's death on 16 February 1745/6. Lord Galloway served as the Scottish Lord of Police from roughly 1743 to 1768, in which role he was responsible for implementing government policy and suppressing disorder during the Jacobite rising of 1745. On 24 August 1756, he succeeded Sir Archibald Stewart, 2nd Baronet, his third cousin once removed as 4th Baronet, of Burray. He served as Grand Master of the Grand Lodge of Scotland from 1757 to 1759 and was Lt.-Gen. and President of the Council of the Royal Archers from 1765 to 1768.

== Personal life ==
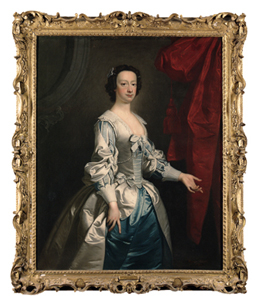
Catherine Cochrane, Countess of Galloway, painting by Thomas Hudson, 1749.

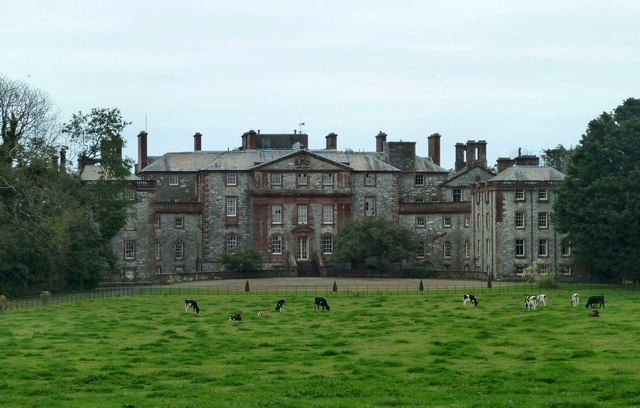
Galloway House, the family seat in Scotland from the 1740s until 1908

In 1719, Stewart married Lady Anne Keith, the youngest daughter of William Keith, 9th Earl Marischal and Lady Mary Drummond (eldest daughter of James Drummond, 4th Earl of Perth). Together, they were the parents of the following children:

- Hon. Alexander Stewart, Master of Garlies (1719–1738), who died unmarried at Aix-la-Chapelle.
- Hon. James Stewart (d. 1733), who died of smallpox while a student at Dalkeith School.
- Hon. John Stewart, who died young.
- Lady Mary Stewart (d. 1751), who married Kenneth Mackenzie, Lord Fortrose, eldest son of William Mackenzie, 5th Earl of Seaforth and is buried at St Mary Abbots Church, Kensington.

Upon the death of Lady Anne in 1728, Stewart, a poet, wrote a set of verses preserved by Sir Alexander Murray of Stanhope and later printed by James Maidment.

In January 1728 (or 1729), he was married to his cousin, Lady Catherine Cochrane, the third and youngest daughter of John Cochrane, 4th Earl of Dundonald and Lady Anne Murray (second daughter of Charles Murray, 1st Earl of Dunmore). They had nine surviving children:

- John Stewart, 7th Earl of Galloway (1736–1806), who married Lady Charlotte Mary Greville, third daughter of Francis Greville, 1st Earl of Warwick. After her death, he married Anne Dashwood, daughter of Sir James Dashwood, 2nd Baronet.
- Hon. George Stewart (d. 1758), a Lieutenant who died at Fort Ticonderoga during the French and Indian War.
- Vice Admiral the Hon. Keith Stewart of Glasserton (1739–1795), who married Georgina Isabella d'Aguilar, a daughter of Ephraim Lópes Pereira d'Aguilar, 2nd Baron d'Aguilar.
- Lady Euphemia Stewart (1729-1818)
- Lady Catherine Stewart (b. c. 1730), married her cousin James Murray of Broughton.
- Lady Margaret Stewart (b. c.1732-1762), married Charles Gordon, 4th Earl of Aboyne.
- Lady Charlotte Stewart (d. 1818), married John Murray, 4th Earl of Dunmore.
- Lady Harriet Stewart (d. 1788), married Archibald Hamilton, 9th Duke of Hamilton.
- Lady Susanna Stewart (b.1742/3-1805), who married Granville Leveson-Gower, 1st Marquess of Stafford.

Lord Galloway died on 24 September 1773 and was succeeded by his eldest surviving son who became the 7th Earl of Galloway. His widow died on 15 March 1786.

Masonic offices
Preceded by Lord Aberdour	Grand Master of the Grand Lodge of Scotland; 1757–1759	Succeeded by The Earl of Leven
Peerage of Scotland
Preceded by James Stewart	Earl of Galloway; 1745/6–1773	Succeeded by John Stewart
Baronetage of Nova Scotia
Preceded by Archibald Stewart	Baronet (of Burray); 1704–1773	Succeeded by John Stewart
