= Baptist Proby =

Baptist Proby (bapt. 14 June 1726 – 18 January 1807) was Dean of Lichfield from 1776 until 1807.

== Life ==
Proby was the fifth son of John Proby of Elton Hall in Elton, Huntingdonshire, MP for Huntingdonshire (1722–27) and Stamford (1743–47), and his wife Hon. Jane Leveson-Gower, eldest daughter of John Leveson-Gower, 1st Baron Gower. His elder brother was John Proby, 1st Baron Carysfort. He was educated at Jesus College, Cambridge; and ordained in 1750. He held incumbencies at Exton, Doddington, Thornhaugh and Wansford before his time as Dean.

He died on 18 January 1807.

== Family ==
Proby married Mary Russell, daughter of John Russell, rector of Fiskerton. They had 14 children, of whom eight survived to adulthood:

- John Proby (bapt. 5 March 1753 – ), died in infancy
- Mary Proby (bapt. 10 September 1754 – 27 February 1829), married in 1782 Francis Mackenzie, 1st Baron Seaforth
- Jane Proby (bapt. 11 December 1755 – ), died in infancy
- Baptist Beresford Proby (bapt. 15 April 1757 – 1758), died in infancy
- Granville Proby (bapt. 18 February 1759 – buried 23 February 1759), died in infancy
- Granville Proby (bapt. 21 August 1760 – ), died in infancy
- Baptist John Proby (1761–1829), became vicar of Brewood, married Mary Susannah, youngest daughter of Sir Nigel Gresley, 6th Baronet
- Catherine Proby (bapt. 15 July 1762 – ), married her cousin, Rev. Charles Proby, son of Capt. Charles Proby, R.N.
- John Proby (bapt. 11 April 1764 – ), died in infancy
- Caroline Proby (bapt. 16 October 1766 – 2 February 1800), married in 1792, Edward Grove
- Anne Proby (bapt. 25 October 1768 – 19 November 1847), died unmarried in Clifton, Bristol
- Charles Proby (1771–1859), Canon of Windsor, married 1814, Frances, daughter of the Rev. John Sharrar
- Joshua John Brownlow Proby (bapt. 28 October 1773 – 4 March 1810), died in Bengal
- Susan Proby (died 11 August 1804), youngest daughter, died unmarried in Clifton
