= Charles Proby =

Charles James Proby M.A. (23 January 1771 – 2 February 1859) was a Canon of Windsor from 1814 to 1859.

== Family ==
He was the son of the Very Revd. Baptist Proby and Mary Russell.

He married Frances Sharrer, daughter of Revd. John Sharrer on 30 June 1814. They had the following children:

- Gertrude Mary Proby
- Frances Susan Proby
- Agnes Mary Proby
- Charles John Proby
- Churchill Proby

== Career ==
He was educated at St John's College, Cambridge where he graduated B.A. in 1792, and M.A. in 1795.

He was appointed:

- Vicar of Bishop’s Tachbrook, Warwickshire 1803
- Chaplain to John Proby, 2nd Earl of Carysfort when ambassador to Berlin
- Vicar of St Mary's Church, Twickenham 1818 - 1859

He was appointed to the fifth stall in St George's Chapel, Windsor Castle in 1814 and held this until he died in 1859.
