= Earl of Galloway =

Title in the Peerage of Scotland

Earldom of Galloway
- Or, a fesse chequy azure and argent, surmounted of a bend engrailed gules, within a double tressure flory counterflory gules
- Creation date: 19 September 1623
- Created by: James VI and I
- Peerage: Peerage of Scotland
- First holder: Alexander Stewart, 1st Lord Garlies
- Present holder: Andrew Clyde Stewart, 14th Earl of Galloway
- Heir apparent: Alexander Stewart, Lord Garlies
- Remainder to: 1st Earl's heirs male of the body
- Subsidiary titles: Lord Garlies; Baron Stewart
- Seat: Cumloden House
- Former seat: Galloway House
- Motto: Virescit vulnere virtus ("Courage grows strong at a wound")

Earl of Galloway is a title in the Peerage of Scotland. It was created in 1623 for Alexander Stewart, 1st Lord Garlies, with remainder to his heirs male bearing the name and arms of Stewart. He had already been created Lord Garlies in the Peerage of Scotland in 1607, with remainder to the heirs male of his body succeeding to the estates of Garlies. This branch of the Stewart family were distant relatives of the Stewart Kings of Scotland.

== History ==
Coat of arms of The Earl of Galloway

Lord Galloway was succeeded by his second but eldest surviving son, the second Earl. He had already been created a Baronet, of Corsewell in the county of Wigtown, in 1627. This title is in the Baronetage of Nova Scotia. His grandson, the fifth Earl (who had succeeded his elder brother, who in his turn had succeeded his father), was a politician. He was succeeded by his son, the sixth Earl. He was a Lord of Police. In 1704 Lord Galloway succeeded his kinsman Sir Archibald Stewart, 2nd Baronet, of Burray, as third Baronet of Burray (see below). On his death, the titles passed to his eldest son, the seventh Earl. He was a Member of Parliament and served as Lord-Lieutenant of Wigtownshire. From 1774 to 1796 he sat in the House of Lords as a Scottish representative peer. In 1796 Lord Galloway was created Baron Stewart of Garlies in the Peerage of Great Britain, which gave him an automatic seat in the House of Lords until the Peerage Act 1963 extended that right to all holders of Scottish peerages. He was succeeded by his son, the eighth Earl. He was an admiral in the Royal Navy, a Member of Parliament and Lord-Lieutenant of Kirkcudbrightshire and Wigtownshire. When he died the titles passed to his eldest son, the ninth Earl. He represented Cockermouth in the House of Commons and was Lord-Lieutenant of Kirkcudbrightshire and Wigtownshire. He was succeeded by his eldest son, the tenth Earl. He sat as Member of Parliament for Wigtownshire. On his death, the titles passed to his younger brother, the eleventh Earl. He was a soldier and fought in the Crimean War and in the Indian Rebellion of 1857. He was succeeded by his only son, the twelfth Earl. He served as Lord-Lieutenant of Kirkcudbrightshire. His only son, the thirteenth Earl, succeeded in 1978. The thirteenth Earl, who suffered from mental illness after being lobotomised at the age of 23, married, but died childless in 2020, upon which the line of descent from the eleventh earl failed. As of 2020 the present holder of the titles is the thirteenth earl's second cousin once removed. He is the great-grandson of Major-General Hon. Alexander Stewart (1838–1896), the third son of the ninth Earl.

Several other members of the family have also gained distinction. The Hon. John Stewart, third son of the third Earl, was a brigadier-general in the army and also sat as Member of Parliament for Wigtownshire. The Hon. Keith Stewart, third son of the sixth Earl, was an Admiral and Member of Parliament. His son James Alexander Stewart-Mackenzie was Governor of Ceylon. His grandson was James Stewart-Mackenzie, 1st Baron Seaforth. The Hon. Montgomery Granville John Stewart, sixth son of the seventh Earl, represented Kirkcudbrightshire in the House of Commons. The Hon. James Henry Keith Stewart, eighth son of the seventh Earl, was Member of Parliament for Wigtown Burghs. The Hon. Keith Stewart (1814–1859), younger son of the eighth Earl, was an admiral in the Royal Navy.

The Stewart Baronetcy, of Burray in the County of Orkney, was created in the Baronetage of Nova Scotia on 4 November 1687 for Archibald Stewart. In 1704 the title was inherited by the aforementioned sixth Earl.

The Earls of Galloway are now considered to be the senior branch of Clan Stewart, although their exact descent is debated.

The family seat is Cumloden House, near Newton Stewart, Dumfries and Galloway. The former family seat was Galloway House, near Garlieston, Wigtownshire.

== Earls of Galloway (1623) ==
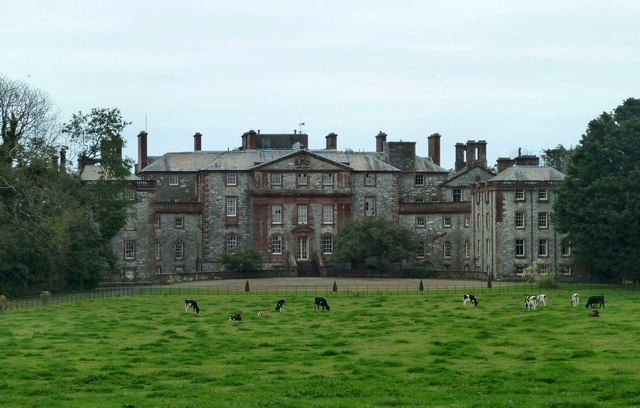
Galloway House, the family seat in Scotland from the 1740s until 1908

- Alexander Stewart, 1st Earl of Galloway (d. 1649)
- James Stewart, 2nd Earl of Galloway (c. 1610–1671)
- Alexander Stewart, 3rd Earl of Galloway (c. 1643–1690)
- Alexander Stewart, 4th Earl of Galloway (1660–1694)
- James Stewart, 5th Earl of Galloway (d. 1746)
- Alexander Stewart, 6th Earl of Galloway (c. 1694–1773)
- John Stewart, 7th Earl of Galloway, 1st Baron Stewart of Garlies (1736–1806)
- George Stewart, 8th Earl of Galloway, 2nd Baron Stewart of Garlies (1768–1834)
- Randolph Stewart, 9th Earl of Galloway, 3rd Baron Stewart of Garlies (1800–1873)
- Alan Plantagenet Stewart, 10th Earl of Galloway, 4th Baron Stewart of Garlies (1835–1901)
- Randolph Henry Stewart, 11th Earl of Galloway, 5th Baron Stewart of Garlies (1836–1920)
- Randolph Algernon Ronald Stewart, 12th Earl of Galloway, 6th Baron Stewart of Garlies (1892–1978)
- Randolph Keith Reginald Stewart, 13th Earl of Galloway, 7th Baron Stewart of Garlies (1928–2020)
- Andrew Clyde Stewart, 14th Earl of Galloway, 8th Baron Stewart of Garlies (b. 1949)

== Present peer ==
Andrew Clyde Stewart, 14th Earl of Galloway (born 13 March 1949) is the son of Major Alexander David Stewart and his wife Daphne Marion Bonsor. He was educated at Eton College and in 2003 was living at 9 Lennox Garden Mews, Knightsbridge, London SW1.

On 5 March 1977, he married firstly Sara Pollock, daughter of Brigadier James Patrick Pollock; they were divorced in 2001. In 2008 he married secondly Christine Merrick, daughter of Robert Winfried Merrick.

On 27 March 2020, he succeeded a cousin as Earl of Galloway (S., 1623), Baron Stewart of Garlies (G.B., 1795), Lord of Garlies (S., 1607). He also inherited two baronetcies in the Baronetage of Nova Scotia.

With his first wife, Galloway has three children:

- Lady Tania Jane Stewart (born 1979)
- Alexander Patrick Stewart, Lord Garlies (born 1980), heir apparent
- Lady Zoe Inez Stewart (born 1983)

== Stewart baronets, of Burray (1687) ==
- Sir Archibald Stewart, 1st Baronet of Burray (d. 1689)
- Sir Archibald Stewart, 2nd Baronet (d. 1704)
- Sir Alexander Stewart, 3rd Baronet (c. 1694–1773)

for further succession, see above

== See also ==
- Baron Seaforth (1921 creation)
- Stewart Baronets
- Clan Stewart
