= Broughton House =

Town house in Kirkcudbright, Scotland

Coordinates: 54°50′13″N 4°3′16″W

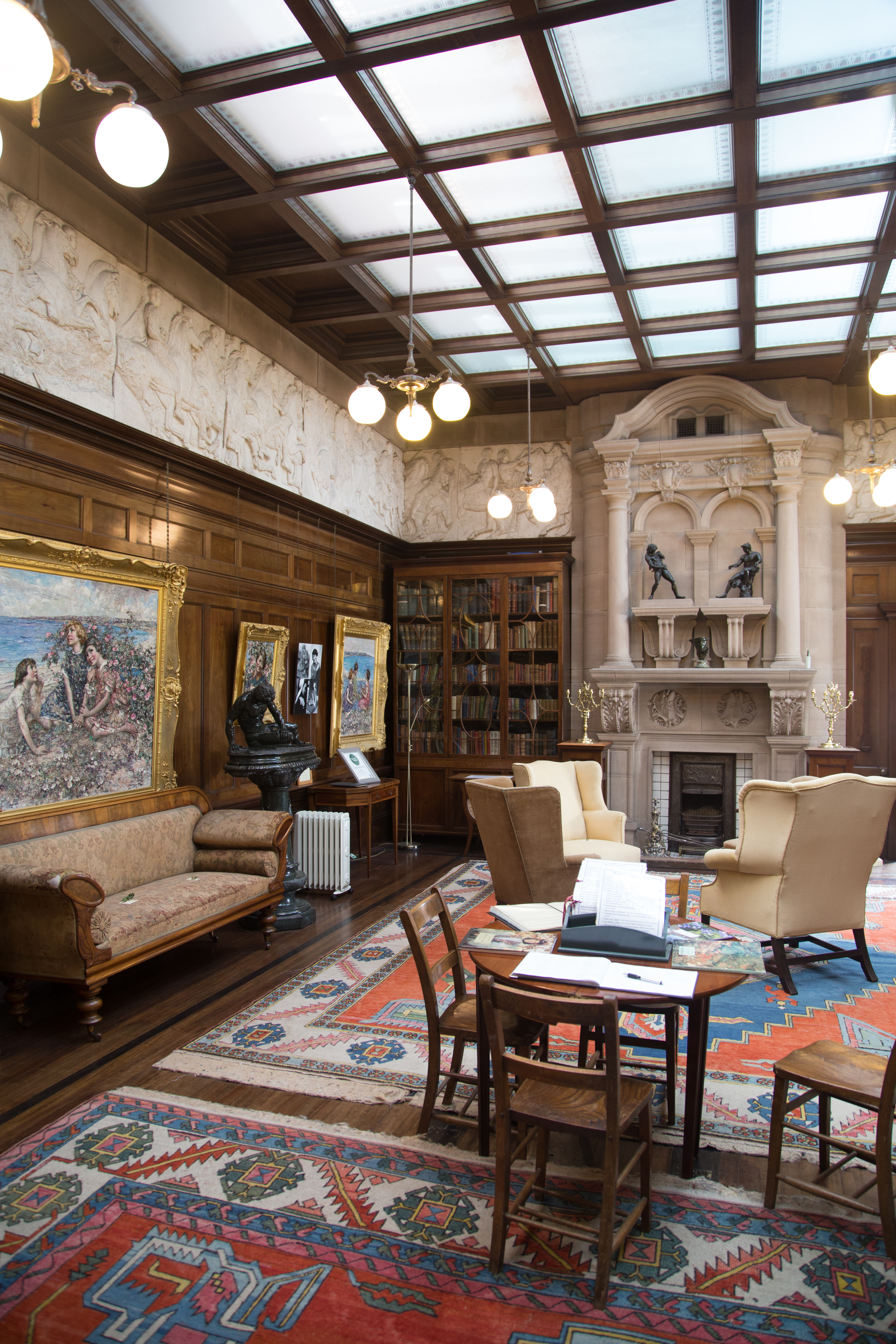
- Established: 1734; 292 years ago
- Location: Kirkcudbright, scotland

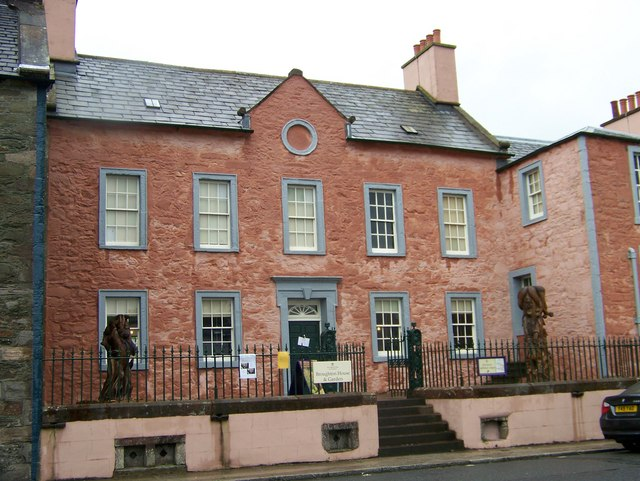
Broughton House, Kirkcudbright

Designations

Inventory of Gardens and Designed Landscapes in Scotland
- Official name: Broughton House
- Designated: 30 June 1987
- Reference no.: GDL00075

Broughton House is an 18th-century town house standing on the High Street of Kirkcudbright, Scotland. It was the home of Scots impressionist artist E. A. Hornel between 1901 and his death in 1933. During this time Hornel remodelled the house and created the Japanese-influenced gardens. Since 1997 it has been in the care of the National Trust for Scotland, and is maintained as "a living museum of Hornel’s life and work". The house is a category A listed building, and the gardens are included on the Inventory of Gardens and Designed Landscapes in Scotland.

== History ==
The main building was constructed in 1734 as two houses, at no.10 and no.12 High Street. In 1740 they were both purchased by Alexander Murray of Broughton, in Wigtownshire, Provost of Kirkcudbright and MP, who had them remodelled as one. The Murray family sold it in 1756, after which it had various owners, including the 5th Earl of Selkirk.

Edward Atkinson Hornel (1864–1933) was brought up in Kirkcudbright, and as an artist was associated with the Glasgow Boys. In the 1890s he travelled to Japan, spending over a year making a series of around 30 paintings that were exhibited in Glasgow on his return in 1895. The proceeds from the sale of these paintings allowed him to spend £650 on buying Broughton House in 1901. Hornel lived at Broughton House with his sister Elizabeth ('Tizzy'), for the rest of his life. He commissioned his friend, the Glasgow architect John Keppie, to add a studio to the house, and in 1910 Keppie designed the gallery. A successful artist, Hornel continued to travel in the Far East, and also collected rare books. After Hornel's death in 1933, his sister continued to live at Broughton House until her death in 1950, after which the property was managed by The Broughton House Trust before being transferred to the National Trust for Scotland. In his will, Hornel wished that his house should "be preserved as a public art gallery for the benefit of the people of the Stewartry and visitors thereto".

== House and gardens ==
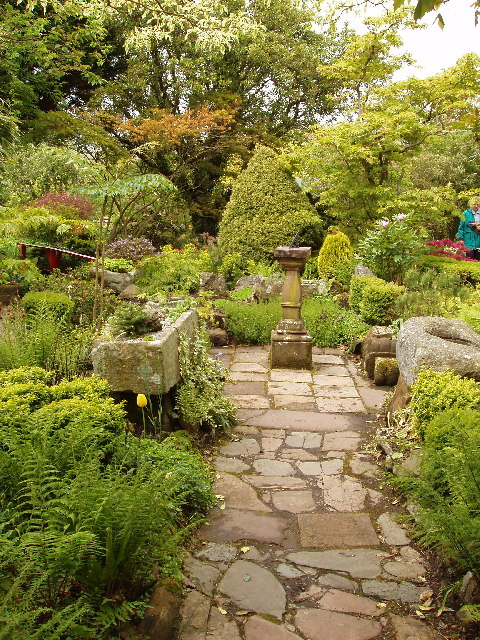
Japanese garden, Broughton House

The National Trust for Scotland maintain the house and its contents as a museum of Hornel's life and work. Within the house is a range of period furniture as well as artworks by Hornel and his contemporaries. The house also contains a large reference library of some 15,000 books collected by Hornel, including a 2,500-volume collection of works by or about Robert Burns, one of the largest such collections in the world. The library also holds Hornel's personal archive of newspaper clippings, letters, and other material. The studio is maintained as it would have looked when the artist was at work. In the gallery is a frieze designed to imitate the Elgin Marbles from the Parthenon.

The gardens, which back onto the River Dee, were laid out by Hornel and his sister and cover an area of around 2 acres (0.81 ha). The Japanese garden includes a rockery and a pond with stepping stones, while closer to the river a series of beds are divided by box hedging. A number of 17th-century and 18th-century sundials are sited in the garden, as well as late 17th-century carved stone gate posts.
