= Glasserton =

Coordinates: 54.72°N 4.45°W

- Location within Dumfries and Galloway
- Council area: Dumfries and Galloway
- Lieutenancy area: Wigtown
- Country: Scotland
- Sovereign state: United Kingdom
- Post town: Newton Stewart
- Postcode district: DG8
- Police: Scotland
- Fire: Scottish
- Ambulance: Scottish
- UK Parliament: Dumfries and Galloway
- Scottish Parliament: Galloway and West Dumfries

Glasserton is a civil parish in Dumfries and Galloway, south-west Scotland. It is on the Machars peninsula, in the traditional county of Wigtownshire. The parish is about 8 miles (13 km) in length, varying in breadth from 1 to 3 miles (1.6 to 4.8 km), and contains 13,477 acres (54.54 km^{2}).

== The Parish ==
It is thought that the name derives from the Saxon for "bare hill". It is located near Whithorn and includes the village of Monreith, the area called Kirkmaiden and two mansions, namely Glasserton Park and Physgill, together with Woodfall Gardens. The Statistical Account remarks that the church "stands near to Glasserton-House, and is romantically embosomed in wood, which sheds around it a vernerable gloom, as if it were a druidical temple, or the sacred grove of some Syrian idol."

Legend has it that Saint Ninian, otherwise called Saint Ringan, the first Bishop of Galloway, lived for a while in a cave near Physgill by way of penitence, and he was the founder of Whithorn Abbey.

Loch and sea fishing are available, and the area is a haven for birdwatchers and wildlife enthusiasts. Low Knock on the outskirts of the village is an open farm where one can see the otters, ornamental ducks, and cattle.

Kirkmaiden-in-Fernis, otherwise Kirkmaiden Church, now a ruin, stood at Lag Point in the Glasserton side of Monreith Bay south. The restored chancel is the burial vault of the Maxwells of Monreith including the historian and naturalist Sir Herbert Maxwell. In 1761 Rev. James Laing was Minister of Glasserton and Kirkmaiden-in-Fernis.

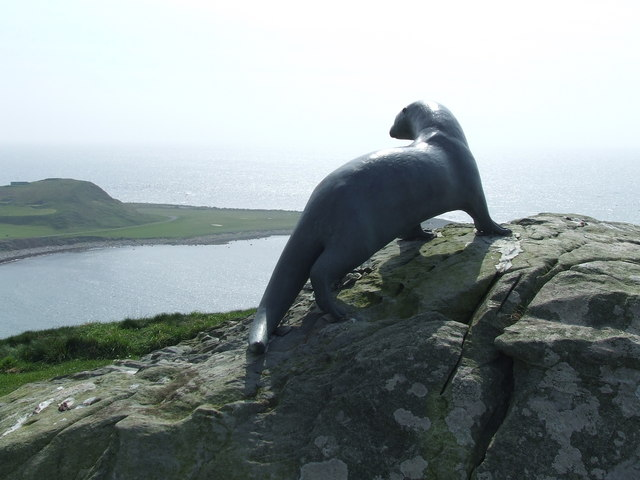
Maxwell's Otter. The memorial to Gavin Maxwell - Maxwell's Otter looks over Front Bay

Near the church is the bronze otter, sculpted by Penny Wheatley, standing as a memorial to Gavin Maxwell, the author of the book Ring of Bright Water, which was made into a successful film. Gavin Maxwell was often seen exercising his tame otter, about which he wrote his book, on the beach below the Kirkmaiden church. There is a signposted walk from the southern end of the village at Clarksburn giving an extensive view of Monreith Bay to Gavin Maxwell's otter.

== Monreith ==
Monreith was called "Milltown of Monreith" so named by the watermills driven by the waterpower of Monreith Burn. Kirkmaiden church was one of the oldest churches in Scotland and the resting place of many of the McCulloch and Maxwell family members who had owned the Monreith estate. Legend has it that when this parish was united with Glasserton, the pulpit and bell were removed from Kirkmaiden church and were to be transported by sea across Luce Bay to a church of the same name in Kirkmaiden Parish in Rhins, Wigtownshire. A strange storm blew up and the boat foundered, sinking the pulpit and bell. The story goes that on the approaching death of any descendant of the McCullochs of Myrton, the wraith-bell rang from the depths of Luce Bay. The church is opposite the car park of St. Medans Golf Club.

In the 1870s Monreith Estate covered about 16,000 acres (65 km^{2}) and was partly in Glasserton and partly in the Mochrum area. Monreith House, still owned by the Maxwell family, is surrounded by woodlands, and looks towards the White Loch of Myrton in Mochrum area. The original home of the Maxwells was the tower house known as the "Dowies" behind the Fell of Barhullion, the highest point overlooking Monreith Village. When the Fell was owned by the Maxwell family, a member of the family boasted that he owned a Fell from which five kingdoms could be seen on a clear day, the kingdoms of Scotland, England, Ireland, Mann, and finally, the Kingdom of Heaven. The Dowies, or Old Place of Monreith, now owned by the Landmark Trust, has been renovated. It may also have been known as Moure Castle or Mowir or Mowr Castle.

Monreith has sandy beaches, quite rare on this section of the Galloway coastline, with safe swimming areas, rock pools and some interesting caves, one of which is streaked red and known as the "Butcher's Cave". The remains of a man-made flounder pool can be found at the extreme end of the Black Rocks sands and was built to catch flounders as the tide receded; at Ben Buoy, which is a sheer rock face, an interesting cave allows a very careful person to cross through the cliff and emerge in a small bay between Knock Farm and Cairndoon farm.

On 16 December 1617 Joanni Kennedie junior de Blairquhan and his wife Marie Stewart had "baroniam de Remistoun" & fortalicio and lands of Lochtoun alias Remistoun. This was also known as Ravenstone, Ravinstone and Remeston.

On 26 October 1625 Alexander Macdouell de Machrimoir (Machermore) was heir of his father Petri Macdouell de Machrimoir, to land in "parochia de Glassertoun".

On 14 July 1662 James Stewart, 2nd Earl of Galloway, had a charter no.278 in the Register of the Great Seal of Scotland, vol. XI p. 140, for many lands including the 8 merkland of Bordland of Ravinstoun, with the castle, etc., (Baroniam de Remistoun) the 4 merklands of Bowtoun of Ravinstoun, the 4 merk lands of Grenan in the parish of Glassertoun; and the 4 merk lands of Barledyon, 4 merklands of Culkae, 8 merklands of Doweltoun alias Dowellistoun alias Machir-Stewart (of McDowell of Machermore ?), 4 merklands of Culnog, in the parish of Sorbie.

Ravenston or Castle Stewart, of W. Stewart Esq., is shown on Ainslie's 1782 map as being in the north-west Glasserton area.

Woodfall (Glasserton) house, park and gardens were built on the large estate on the orders of the Honourable Admiral Keith Stewart, the second surviving son of Alexander Stewart, 6th Earl of Galloway who was given the 2,000-acre (8.1 km^{2}) "Barony of Glasserton" in 1767. The Statistical Account gives in 1795 a detailed description of his agricultural improvements, based on continued raising of the traditional black cattle. He died in 1795, and was succeeded by his son, Rt Hon James Alexander Stewart-Mackenzie, but the house was let and the contents were sold. He sold the house and grounds in 1819 to Stair Hathorn-Stewart at the neighbouring Physgill estate. That which is now called "Woodfall Gardens" was a part of the Glasserton and Physgill estate which was sold some thirty years ago and are now on show to the public.

On the 1782 map Robert Stewart Esq. was at Physgill near Kidsdale, just south of Adm. Keith Stewart of Glasserton. Just south of Physgill in Whithorn area was Tonorghie of Hugh Stewart Esq. Carleton, Glasserton, of MacCairill is mentioned in "History of the Lands and Their Owners in Galloway" by Peter Handyside M'Kerlie, vol. 1, p. 334

== Archaeology ==
Archaeological and Historical Collections relating to Ayrshire and Galloway reported that there were four ancient forts in Glasserton:

1. Fell of Barhullion Hill fort has two concentric ditches and banks with entrances in the south and north. The site on the photo is viewed from one of the Cup & Ring marked rocks in the area. (NX3641: Cup & Ring marked stone, Fell of Barhullion)
2. Near Carleton there was a fort, "Laggan Camp hill fort"
3. There are ruins at Port Castle
4. Glasserton Hill Mote fort or settlement at NX43NW 2, situated partly within Broad Lane Wood.

Cup and ring markings can be found at Glasserton Mains and various locations near Monreith. The area is renowned for several groups of Standing Stones, thought to date back to 2000BC.

Historic Scotland funded the excavation of archaeological remains at Blairbuy Farm. While ploughing, a large stone was unearthed that turned out to be the capstone from a cist burial. Three cists were found and one contained the remains of a skeleton. The cists are likely to date from the Bronze Age some 3-4,000 years ago when nearby monuments Drumtroddan standing stones and the Wren’s Egg were erected. On the shortest day of the year, if you stand on top of The Wren's Egg, a standing stone at Blairbuy Farm, Monreith, the sun will set directly behind Big Scaur ("Scaur" meaning "isolated rock in the sea") which is situated out in Luce Bay. On every other day it sets further west.

== Gallery ==
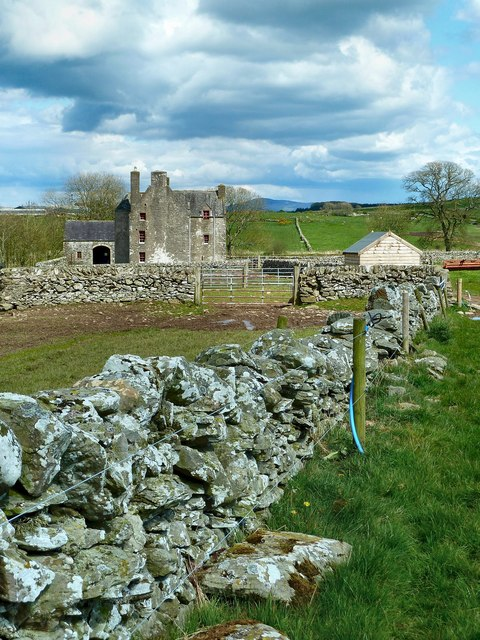
Dowies Castle otherwise Old Place of Monreith or Ballingrene

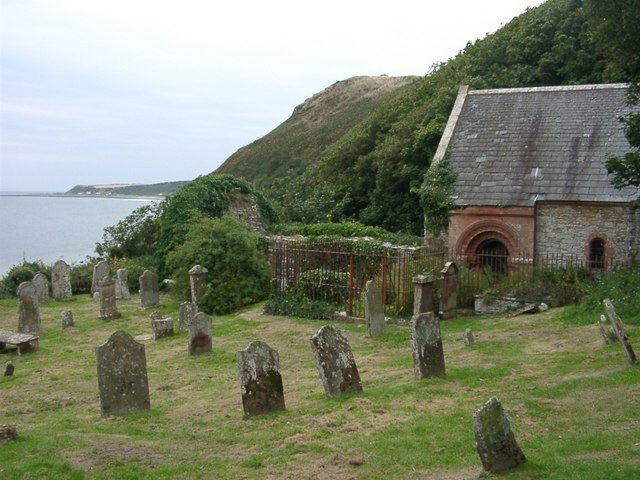
Kirkmaiden Church

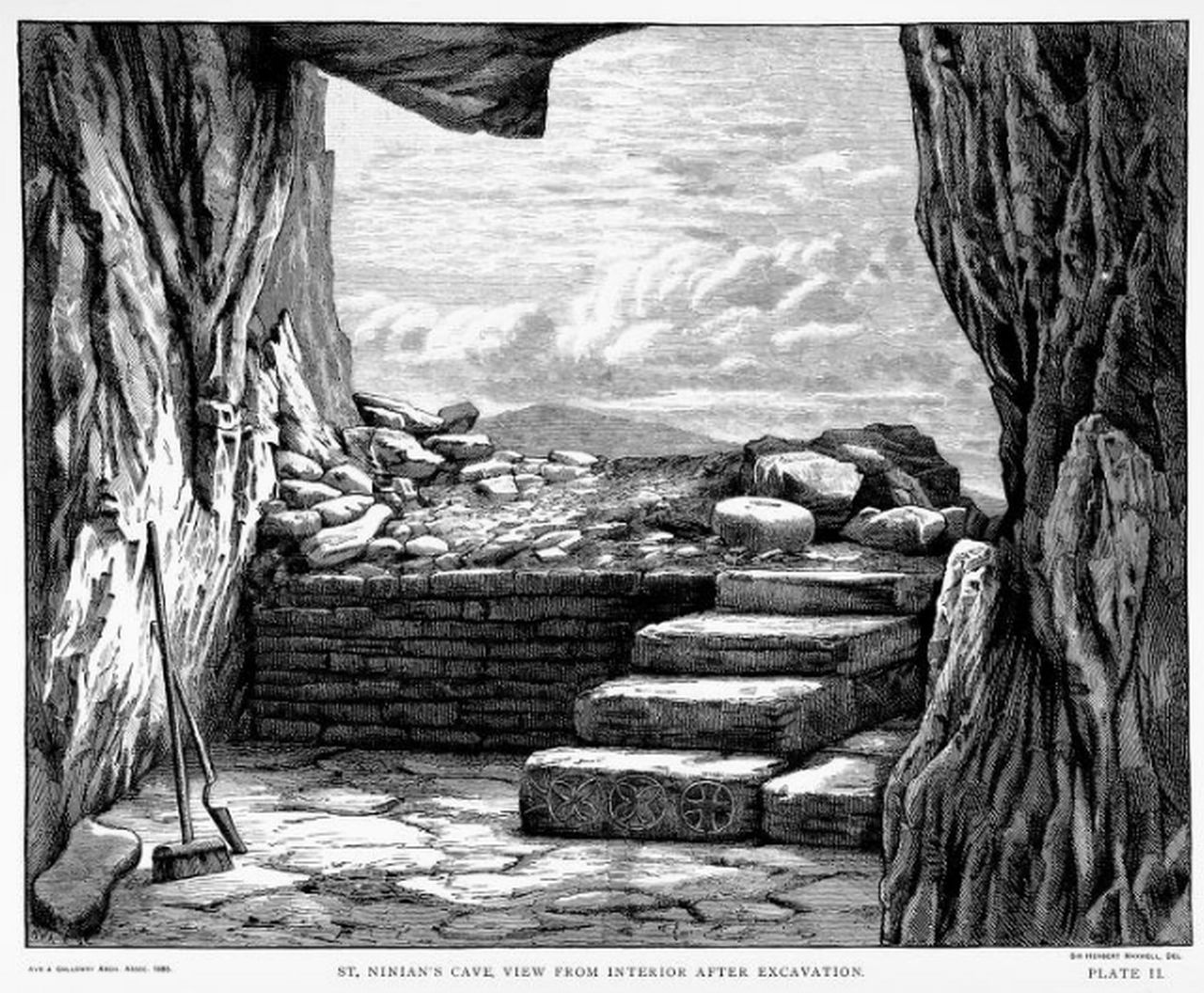
St. Ninian's Cave, Glasserton, by Sir Herbert Maxwell, 1885

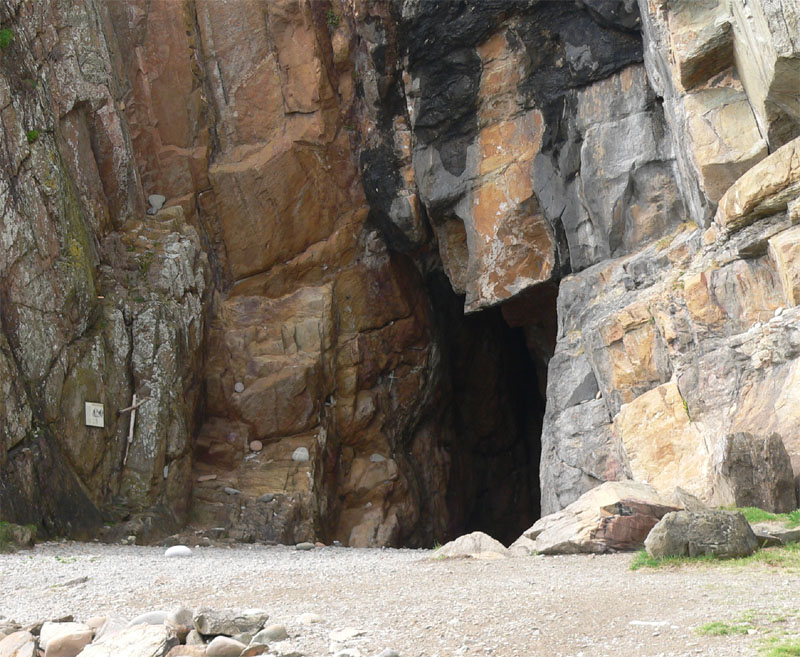
St. Ninian's Cave entrance

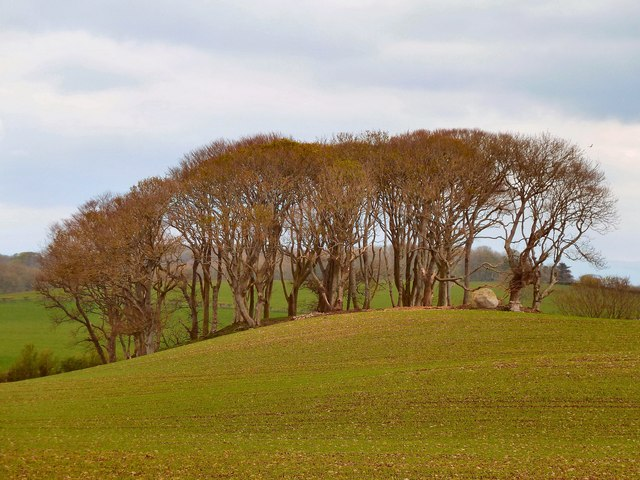
Wren's Egg and Nest, Bronze Age cists, Blairbuy Farm

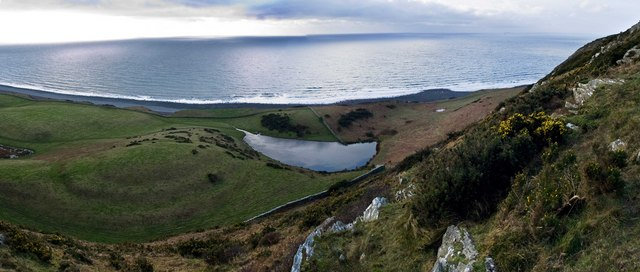
Laggan Camp and Pond Laggan Camp hill fort

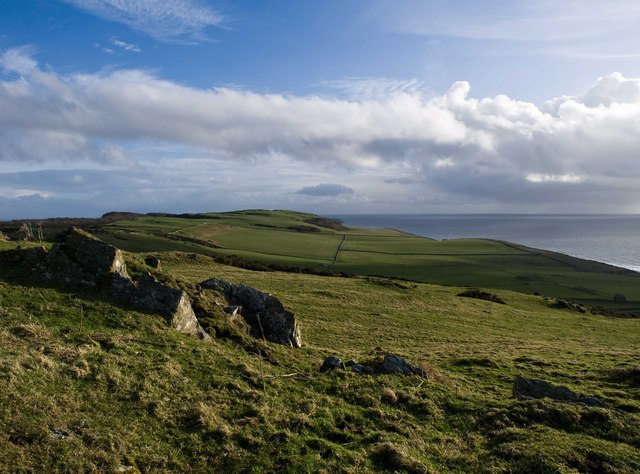
Hill of Glasserton, view of settlement

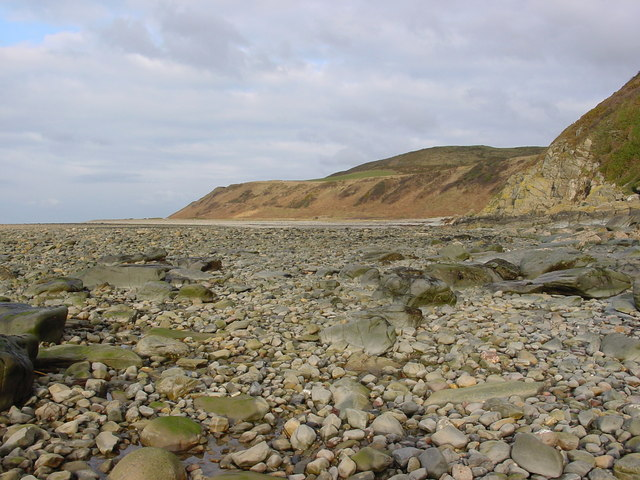
Hill of Glasserton, site of a Promontory Fort

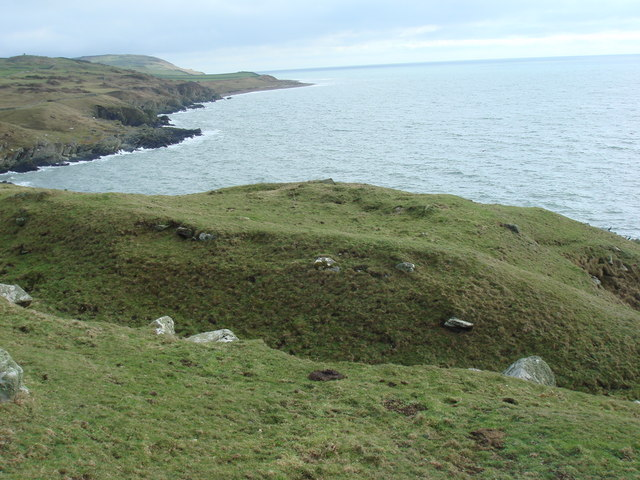
Promontory fort near Point of Lag

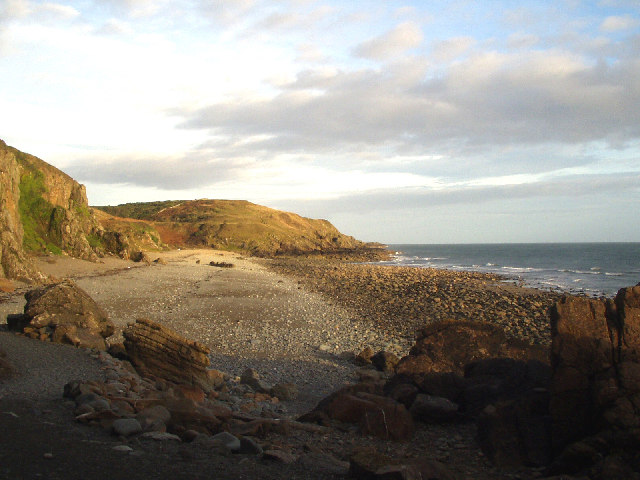
near ruins at Port Castle Bay

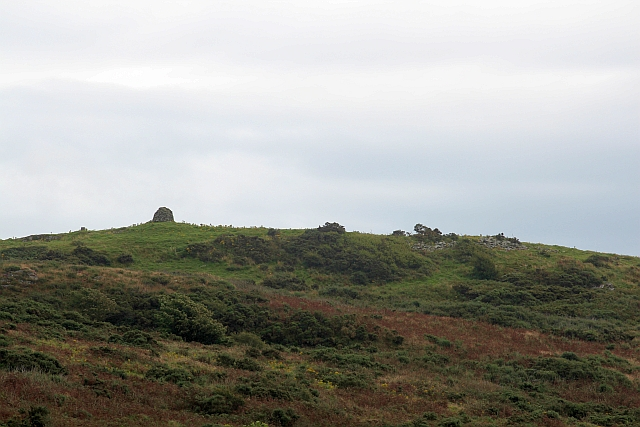
Fell of Barhullion hill fort

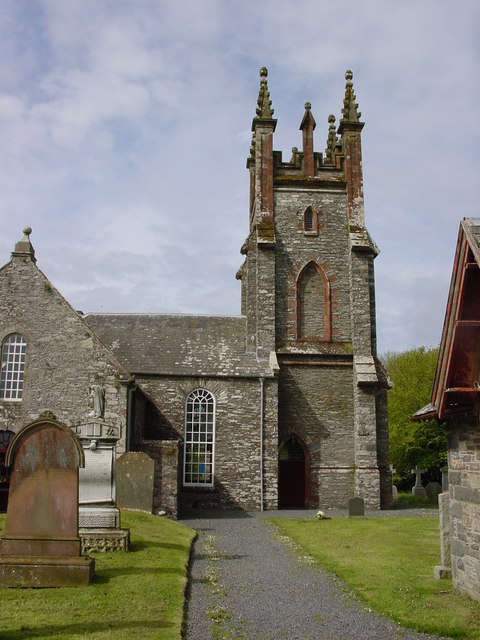
Glasserton Church

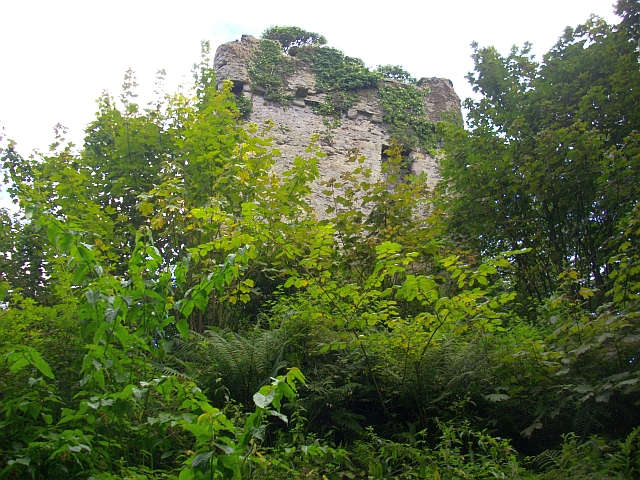
Myrton Castle on the border of old Glasserton-Mochrum parishes

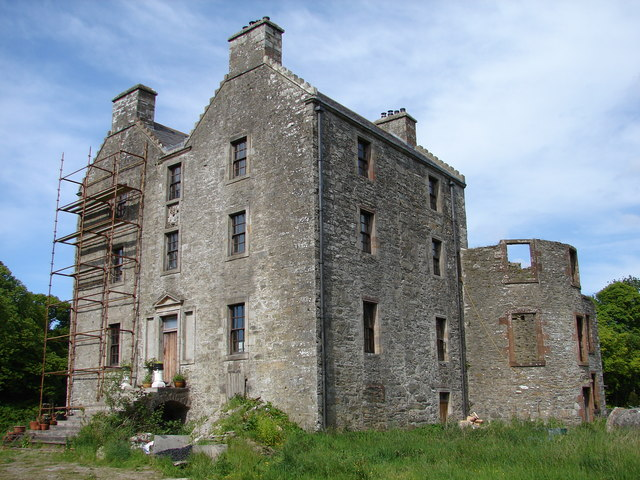
Ravenstone Castle

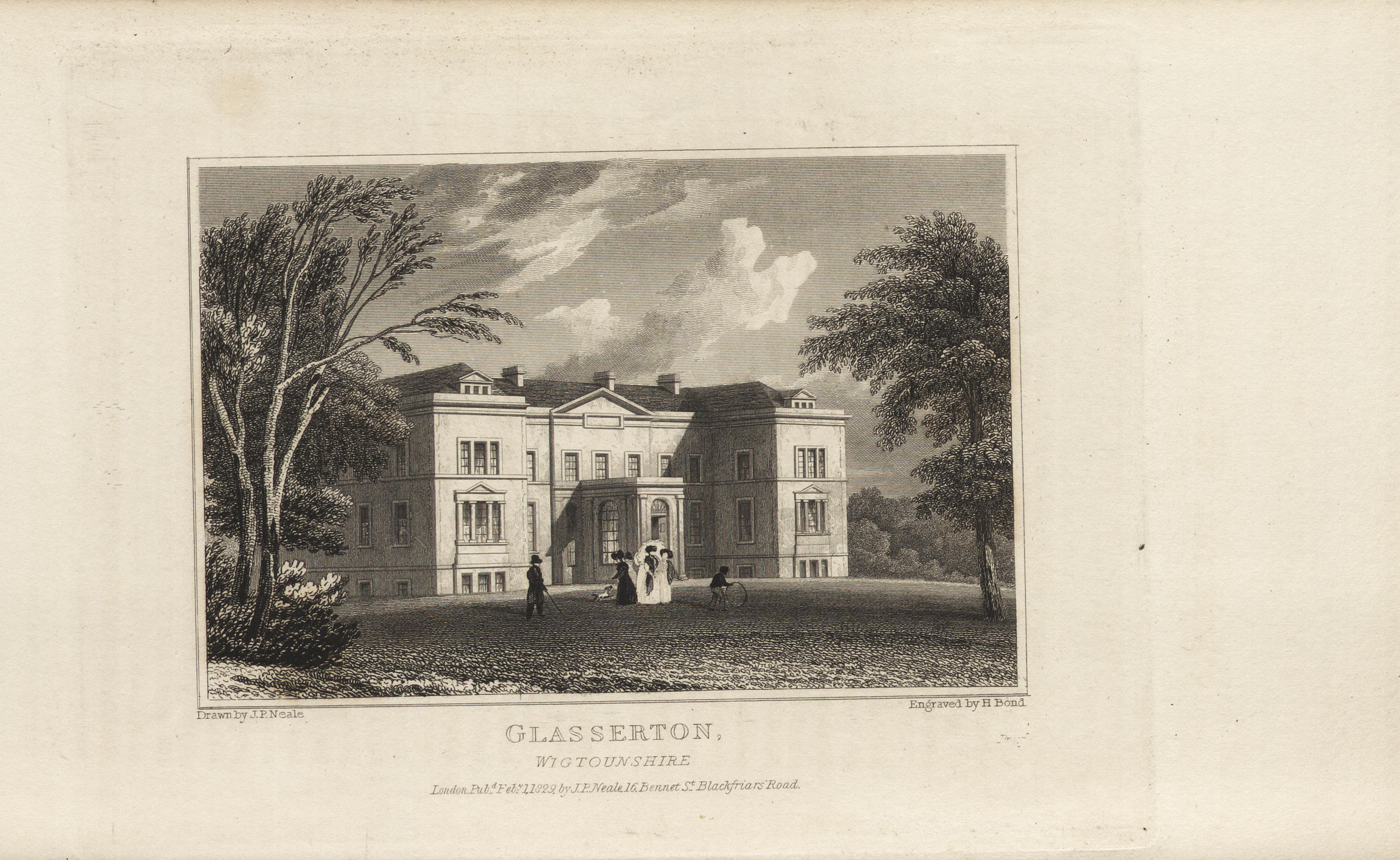
Glasserton, 1824 engraving

== Listed Buildings ==
- List of listed buildings in Glasserton, Dumfries and Galloway
