= Murder of Alexander Montgomerie =

1769 murder in Scotland

Murder of Alexander, 10th Earl of Eglinton
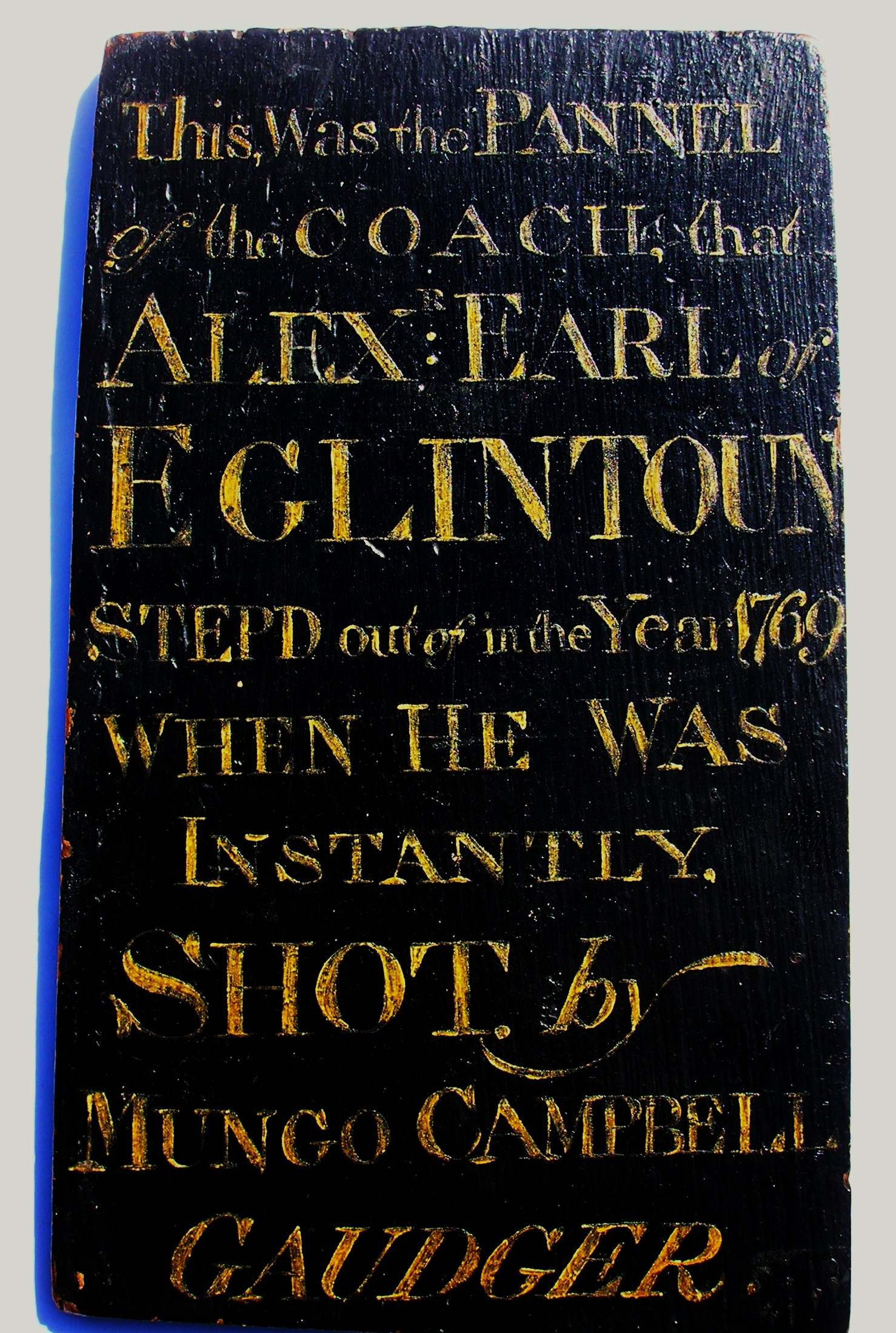
- Section of the Earl of Eglinton's coach door with details of the murder
- Born: Alexander Montgomerie; 10 February 1723; Eglinton Castle
- Died: 25 October 1769 (aged 46); Burnhouse beach, Ardrossan
- Cause of death: Blood loss due to bullet wound
- Resting place: Montgomerie family vault, Kilwinning Abbey
- Citizenship: British
- Education: Irvine
- Occupations: Landowner and Scottish peer
- Parent(s): The 9th Earl of Eglinton and Susanna, Countess of Eglinton

Alexander Montgomerie, 10th Earl of Eglinton, a wealthy Scottish peer and landowner, was mortally wounded on the beach near his stables at Parkhouse on his own estate of Ardrossan in Ayrshire by an excise officer (Scots: Gaudger) named Mungo Campbell on 24 October 1769, following a dispute about poaching and the latter's right to bear arms on the Earl's grounds.

== Lord Eglinton ==
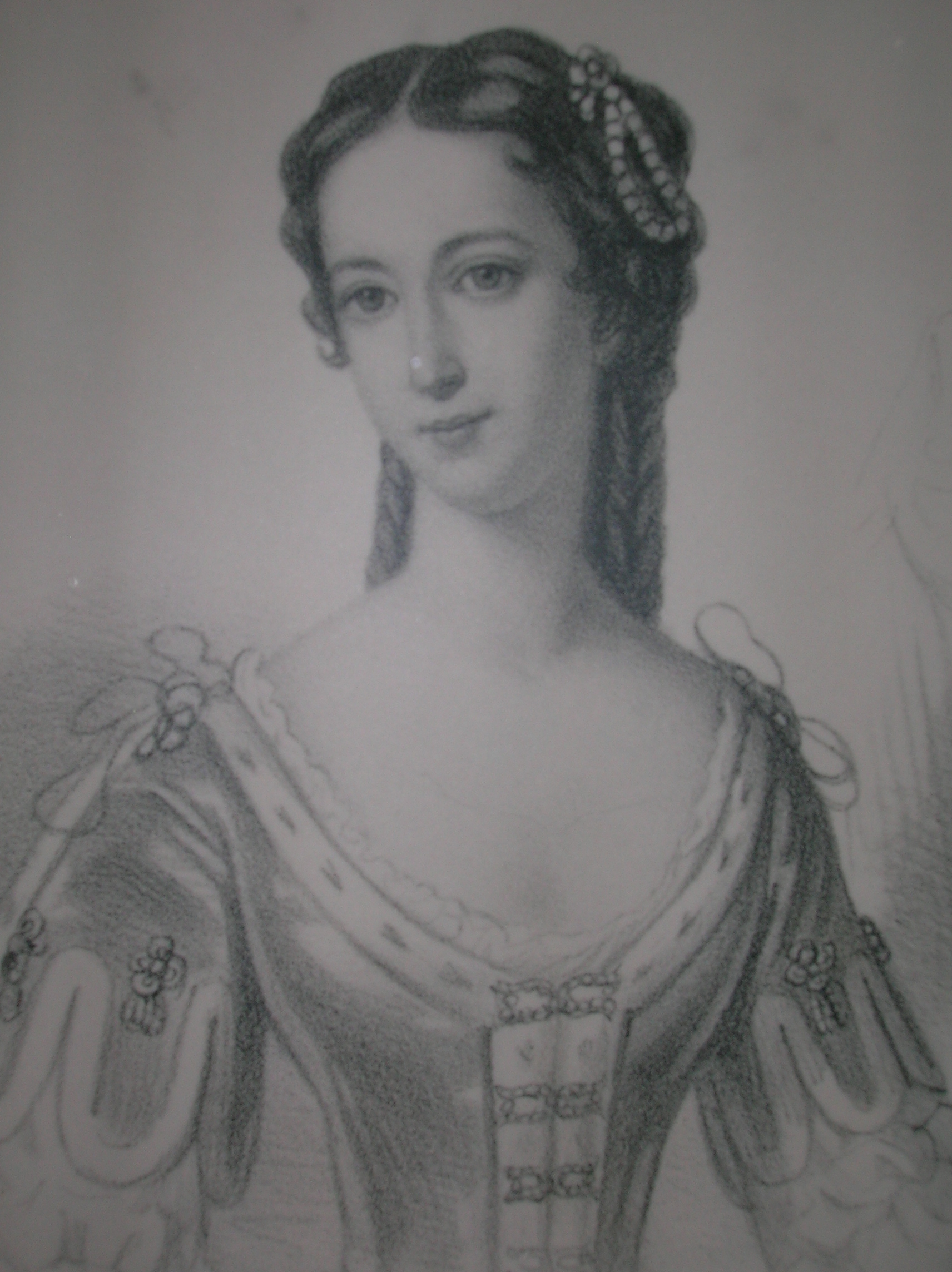
Susanna, mother of The 10th Earl of Eglinton

The 10th Earl of Eglinton, one of twenty siblings, was the eldest son of The 9th Earl of Eglinton (c. 1660–1729) and his third wife, Susanna, Countess of Eglinton, a renowned society beauty. The 10th Earl planned and built the conservation village of Eaglesham in Renfrewshire in 1769 around the basic plan of a capital 'A' (for Alexander). The Earl introduced the young James Boswell to the joys of London society in the early 1760s, and figures prominently in Boswells London Journal, 1762-1763. Lord Eglinton was the Grand Master Mason of the Grand Lodge of Scotland from 1750 to 1751. He was said to be engaged to Jane (or Jean) Montgomerie, daughter of John Maxwell and widow of James Montgomerie of Lainshaw, the brother of Boswell's wife Margaret. He had no legitimate offspring.

Lord Eglinton was a great agricultural innovator and, although this ultimately led to improvements that were of great benefit, they were initially very unpopular with many of the tenants.

== Mungo Campbell ==
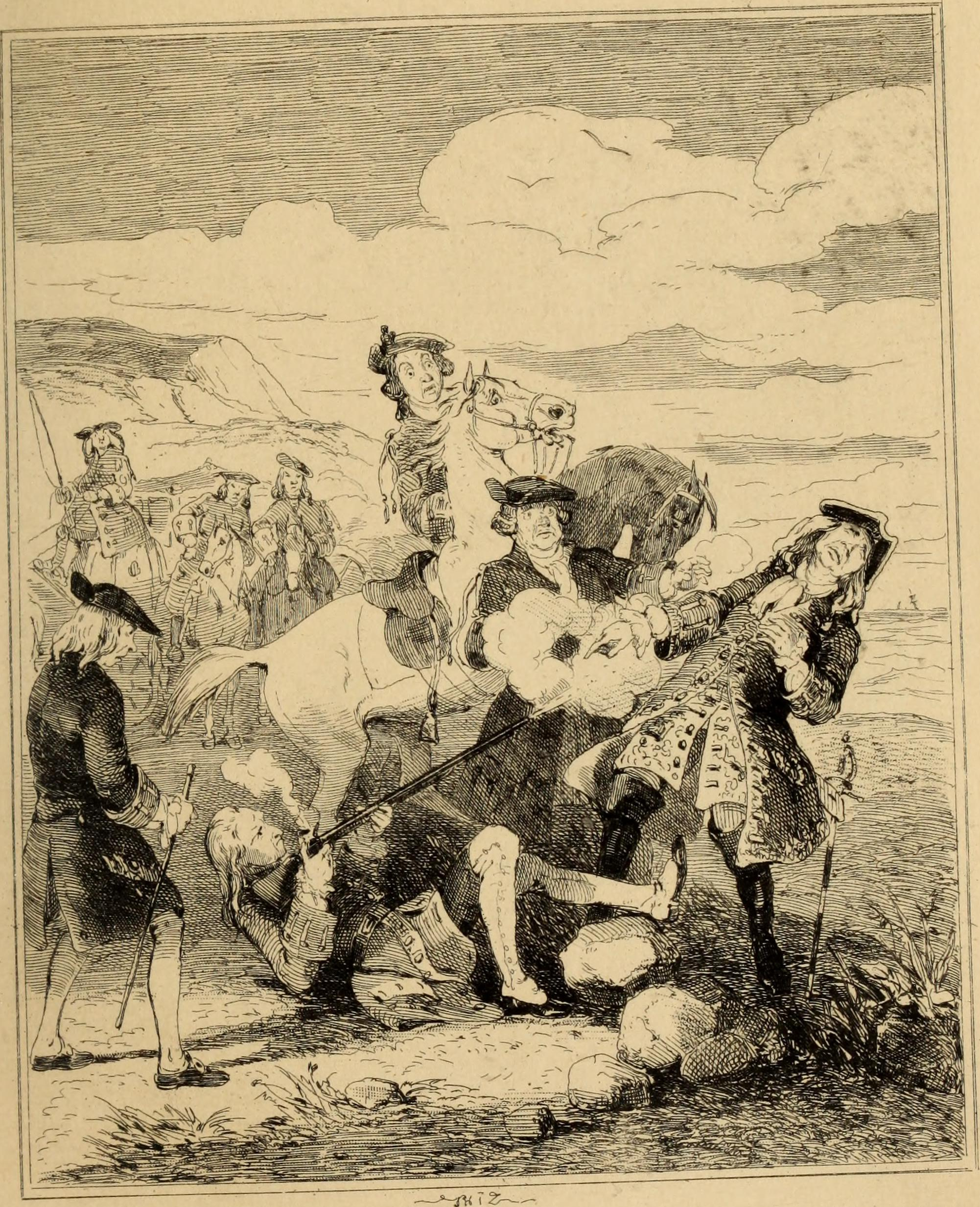
The shooting of the Earl of Eglinton on Ardrossan beach.

Mungo was the son of a Provost of Ayr, born in 1712, and one of twenty-four children. An uncle, also Mungo Campbell, paid for him to have a good education but died when Mungo was about eighteen years of age. He joined the Scots Greys regiment, then commanded by his relation, General Campbell, and served in two campaigns. After the Battle of Dettingen, at which he took part, he had an opportunity of being appointed quartermaster; however, he could not raise the required sum of money and it went to another. He left the army and went back to Scotland in 1745, where Lord Loudoun, a relation, was in command of the loyal Highlanders and Mungo fought with him. After the Battle of Culloden, Lord Loudoun arranged for him to be appointed in 1746 as an excise officer (Scots: gaudger) in Newmilns, then Stewarton, afterwards Irvine and finally Saltcoats.

== The murder ==
=== Background ===
Alexander Bartleymore, an Englishman, was a favourite servant of Lord Eglinton, and like many in the locality had dealings with contraband goods. Mungo, in the course of his duties, had come across Alexander Bartleymore on the seashore with a cart containing eighty gallons of rum, which he duly seized as contraband. However, the cart itself was not impounded, because it was the property of the earl. Bartleymore was held in the Irvine Tolbooth and only escaped deportation to the colonies through the influence of his master. He held a grudge from that day forward and was determined to get his revenge when the opportunity presented itself.

Another crucial element in the story is that Mungo, in the course of duties, was crossing part of Lord Eglinton's estate on a road when a hare started up and ran through the dyke. He 'automatically' shot it with the gun he was carrying, and the earl happened to hear the gunshot. Being committed to the prevention of poaching and the preservation of game, the earl sent a servant to bring Mungo to talk with him. At his meeting with the earl, Mungo apologised for his behaviour, which he explained as having been due to the suddenness of the hare's appearance.

=== The incident ===
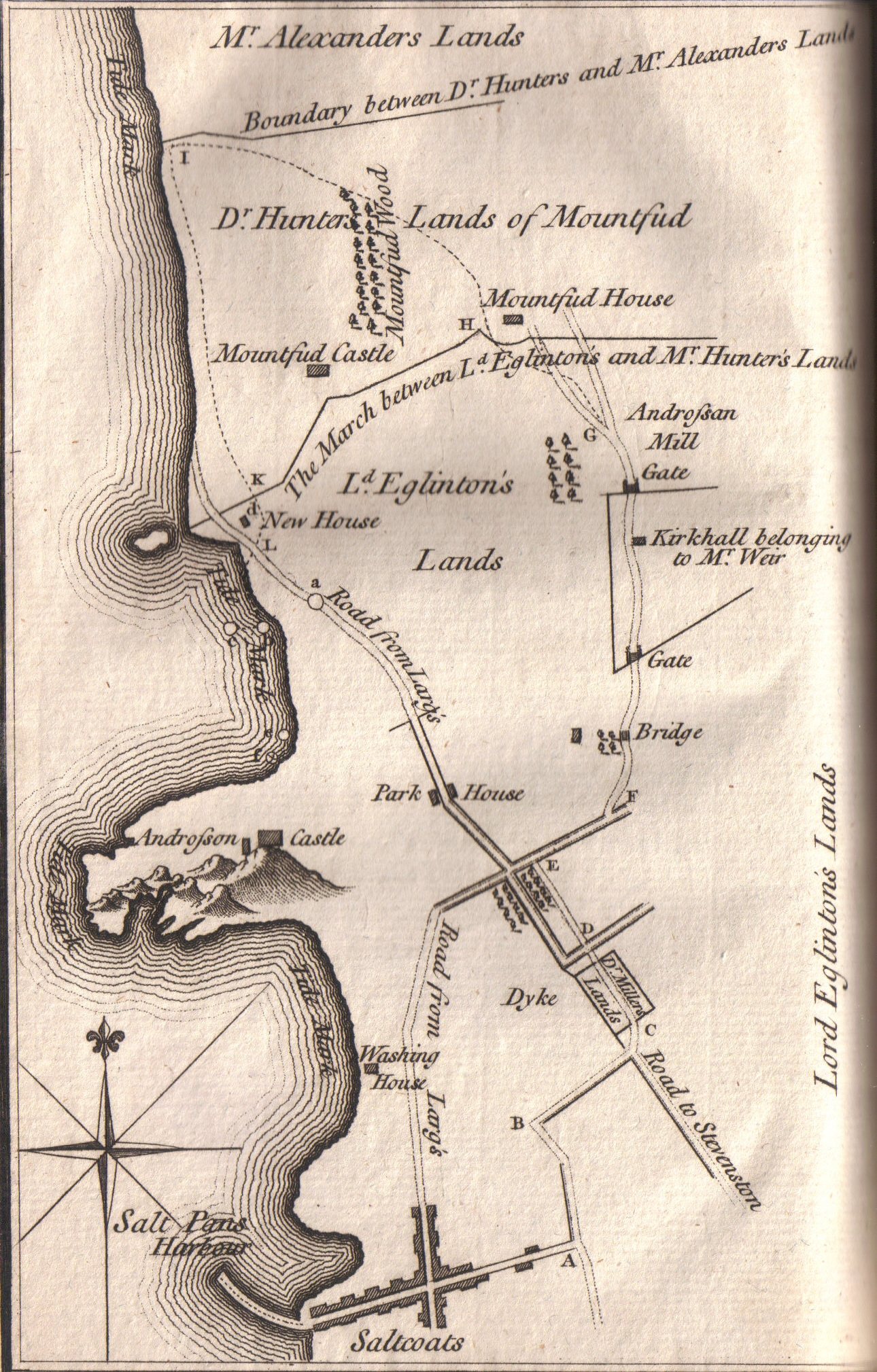
A map of the lands of Montfode and Ardrossan in 1769 showing the details of the incident.

The small estate of Montfode was involved in the case of the murder of The 10th Earl of Eglinton by Mungo Campbell. John Brown, tide-officer or tide-waiter (a customs officer who boarded and inspected incoming ships) at Saltcoats, gave evidence that on the day of the earl's death, Tuesday 24 October 1769, he was on duty and walking with Mungo Campbell "They passed through the grounds of Montfodd, and thereafter crossed a burn, which is the march between Montfodd and the earl of Eglintoun's property, and went through lord Eglintoun's ground towards the sea." Mungo had permission from Dr. Hunter to shoot on the lands of Montfode, as well as preserve game and prosecute poachers; however, he had no such permission from Lord Eglinton. On this day they were hunting for woodcock in the glen of the Montfode Burn and after crossing the Montfode Burn they walked briefly through the Earl of Eglinton's property before reaching the beach.

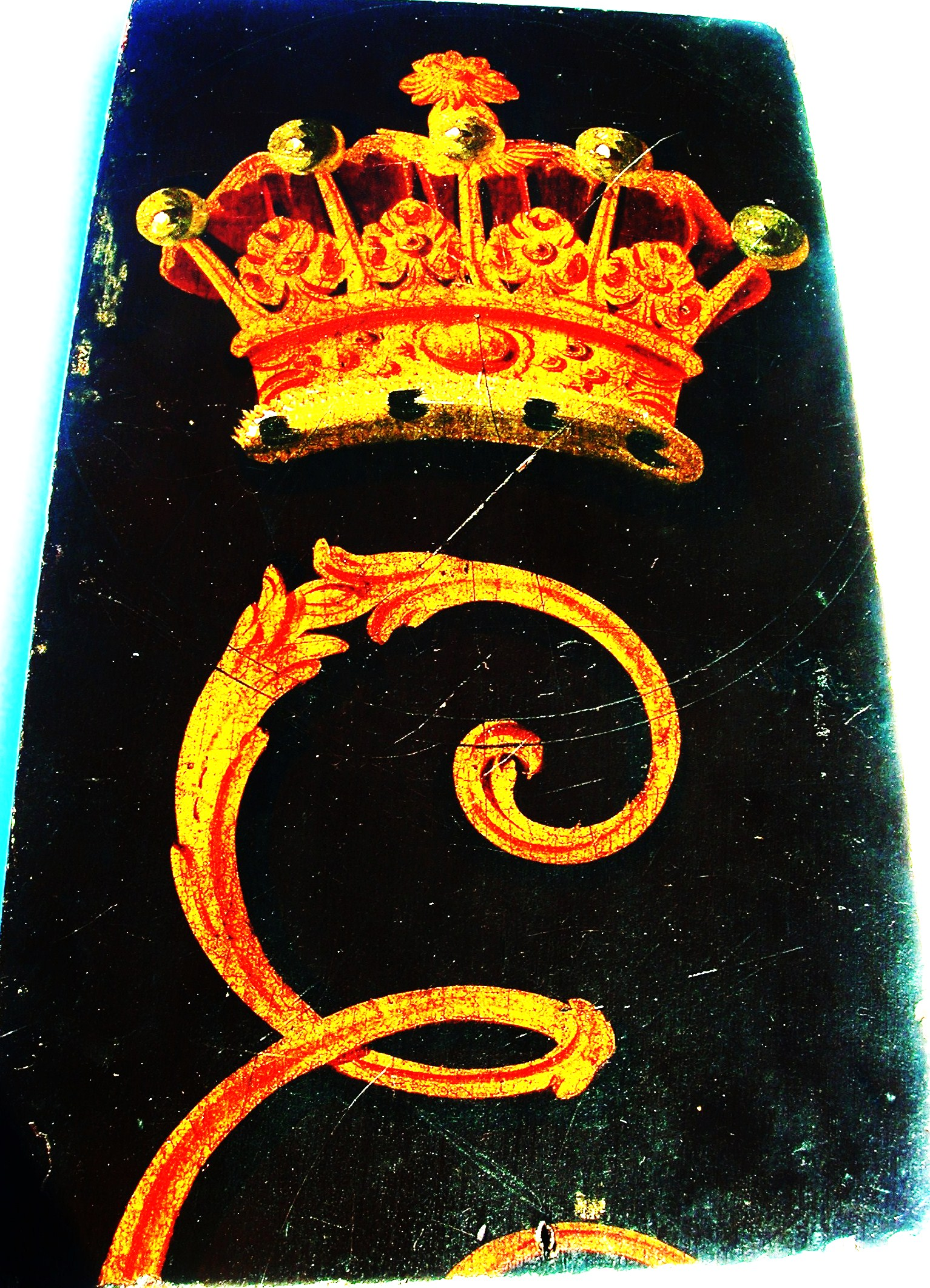
the outside facing side of the panel from the coach in which the 10th Earl travelled during the Mungo Campbell incident.

Travelling in his carriage on the way to Fairlie with four servants following him on horsesback, Lord Eglinton was told that two men, one with a gun, had been seen crossing his land. Bartleymore stated that Mungo Campbell was one of the two suspected poachers and the earl decided to investigate, leaving his carriage and proceeding down the beach on horseback. Upon catching up with Mungo, the earl demanded that he hand over the gun he was carrying, which he refused, saying that he would rather die. The earl then ordered his fowling-piece to be brought from the carriage, saying that he was as good a shot as Mungo. The earl continued to walk towards Mungo who retreated, walking backwards; however, he stumbled on a stone, fell on his back, and the earl moved quickly to grab his gun, at which point Mungo fired at Lord Eglinton, who was mortally wounded in the bowels. Mungo threw his gun away and tried to wrest the earl's gun from his servant. However, he failed and was attacked by the earl's servants who, upon being asked to desist by Lord Eglinton, was tied up and taken to Irvine by cart, then to Ayr, later to Glasgow, and finally to Edinburgh. The mortally wounded Lord Eglinton reportedly said to Mungo that he would not have shot him.

Lord Eglinton was carried to his carriage and taken to Eglinton Castle, where, despite the best available medical attention, he died ten hours later at about one o’clock on the following morning of Wednesday 25 October, having put his affairs in order The preserved door panel contradicts the stated course of events by stating that the earl was instantly shot upon leaving his carriage.

A contemporary newspaper report first recorded the incident as actually being a duel over a woman in which the Earl had been worsted. Indeed, when in London (from 1760 to 1763 at the least), he stayed in Queen Street, Mayfair, and, according to Boswell, he kept a mistress, a Ms. or Mrs. Brown, who, in 1763, "had lived with him seven or eight years".

== The Trial and sentence ==
Some legal argument took place regarding jurisdiction in this case as the incident took place on the beach between high and low water marks. Murder at sea lay within the jurisdiction of the Lord High Admiral of Scotland. The earl that day was attended by several servants, namely John Milliken, John Hazel, John Cooper, James Hutcheson, and Alexander Bartleymore, all of whom gave evidence as witnesses.

After due legal process, Mungo was sentenced to be taken to the tolbooth in Edinburgh, fed on bread and water only, and on 11 April 1770 taken to the Grassmarket where he was to be hanged between 2 and 4pm, after which his body was to be taken for dissection by Dr Alexander Munro.

Mungo Campbell hanged himself with a silk scarf provided by his friends and thereby cheated the hangman. However, the populace, expecting a public hanging, dug up his body and abused it. Mungo's friends took possession of his corpse and buried it at sea. He was found to have left the following note -

"Farewell, vain world, I've had enough of thee,
And now am careless what thou say'st of me,
Thy smiles I court not, nor thy frowns I fear,
My cares are past, my heart lies easy here,
What faults they find in me take care to shun,
And look at home, enough is to be done".

== Subsequent events ==
=== The effect upon the earldom and family ===
Dying without an heir, the earl was succeeded by his brother, Archibald, who now became The 11th Earl of Eglinton. The carriage door, inscribed with the details of the tragedy, was retained by the Montgomerie family until the great sale of Eglinton Castle's contents in the 1920s.

Susanna, Dowager Countess of Eglinton, his mother, never quite recovered from the sight of her dying son being carried into Eglinton Castle and wrote: I shall endeavour to bear my suffering with as little trouble to my fellow creatures as possible. Millar records that after the murder, by Mungo Campbell, she retired from the position which she held in society.

=== A ghost story ===
Lord Eglinton was, it is said, engaged to Jean or Jane, a daughter of the Maxwell family of Pollok House in Eastwood parish near Glasgow, and had been a regular visitor in the months before his intended wedding. At the hour of his mortal wounding at Ardrossan, a servant at Pollock House was surprised to see Lord Eglinton walking up the stairs to the room reserved for his visits. The servant prepared a meal; however, the earl was nowhere to found and it was some time later that the awful news reached the Maxwell family.

=== Immediate aftermath of trial ===
Wilson records that "This sad affair, which took place on the grounds between Saltcoats and Ardrossan, was long the topic of discourse in town and country, .."

Susanna, Dowager Lady Eglinton, was further devastated by the attitude of many of the Montgomerie estate's tenants who had more sympathy for Mungo Campbell than for the earl, and saw his death as a punishment imposed by heaven, due to the misimprovements of his life and the still more irritating improvement of his estates, his changes of old customs, his interference with old tenants. Mungo himself had been well liked in all the places that he had resided as an excise officer, namely Newmilns, Stewarton, Saltcoats and Irvine.

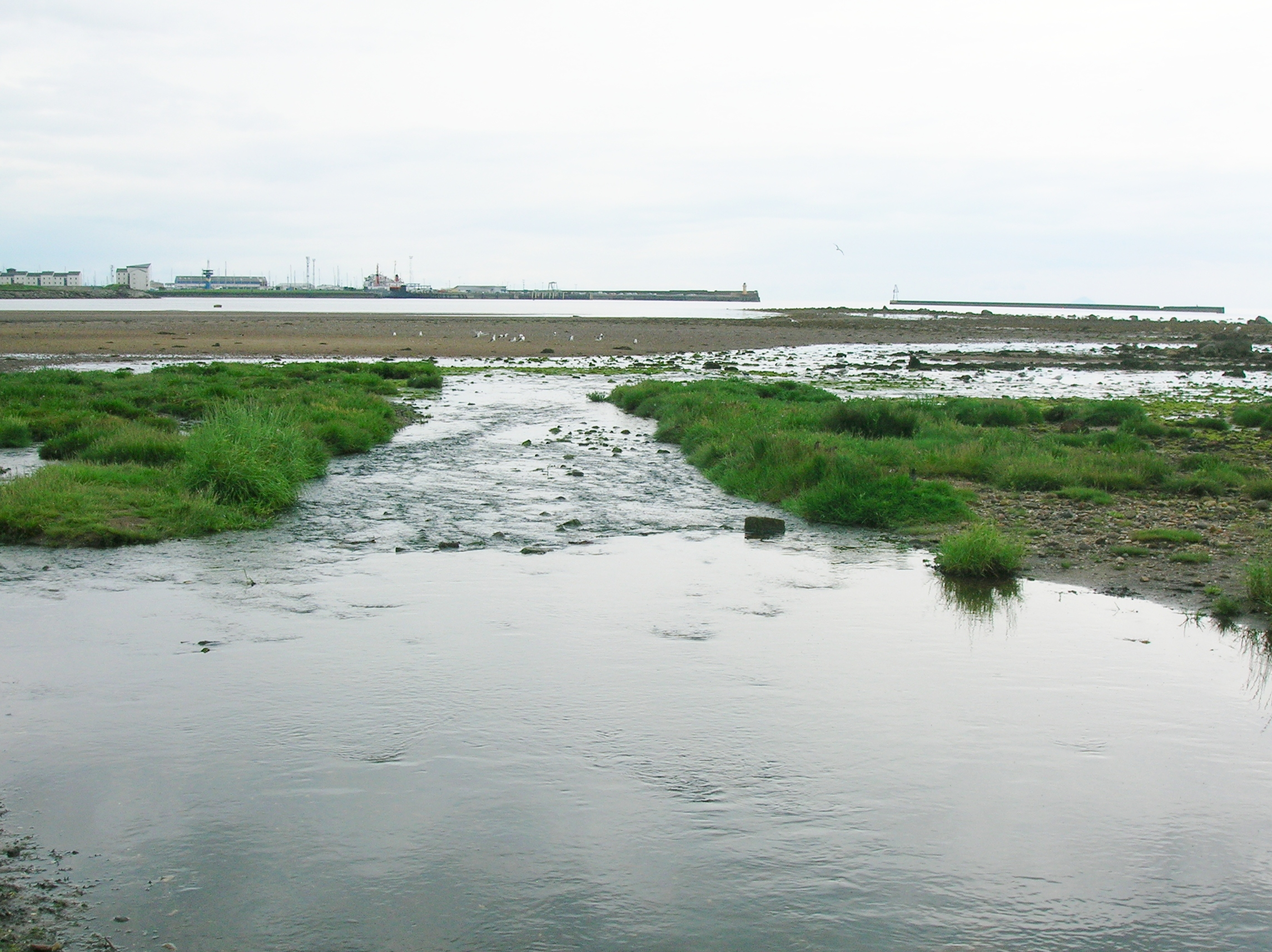
The outflow of the Montfode Burn onto Ardrossan North Bay. Boundary between the estates of Montfode and Eglinton.

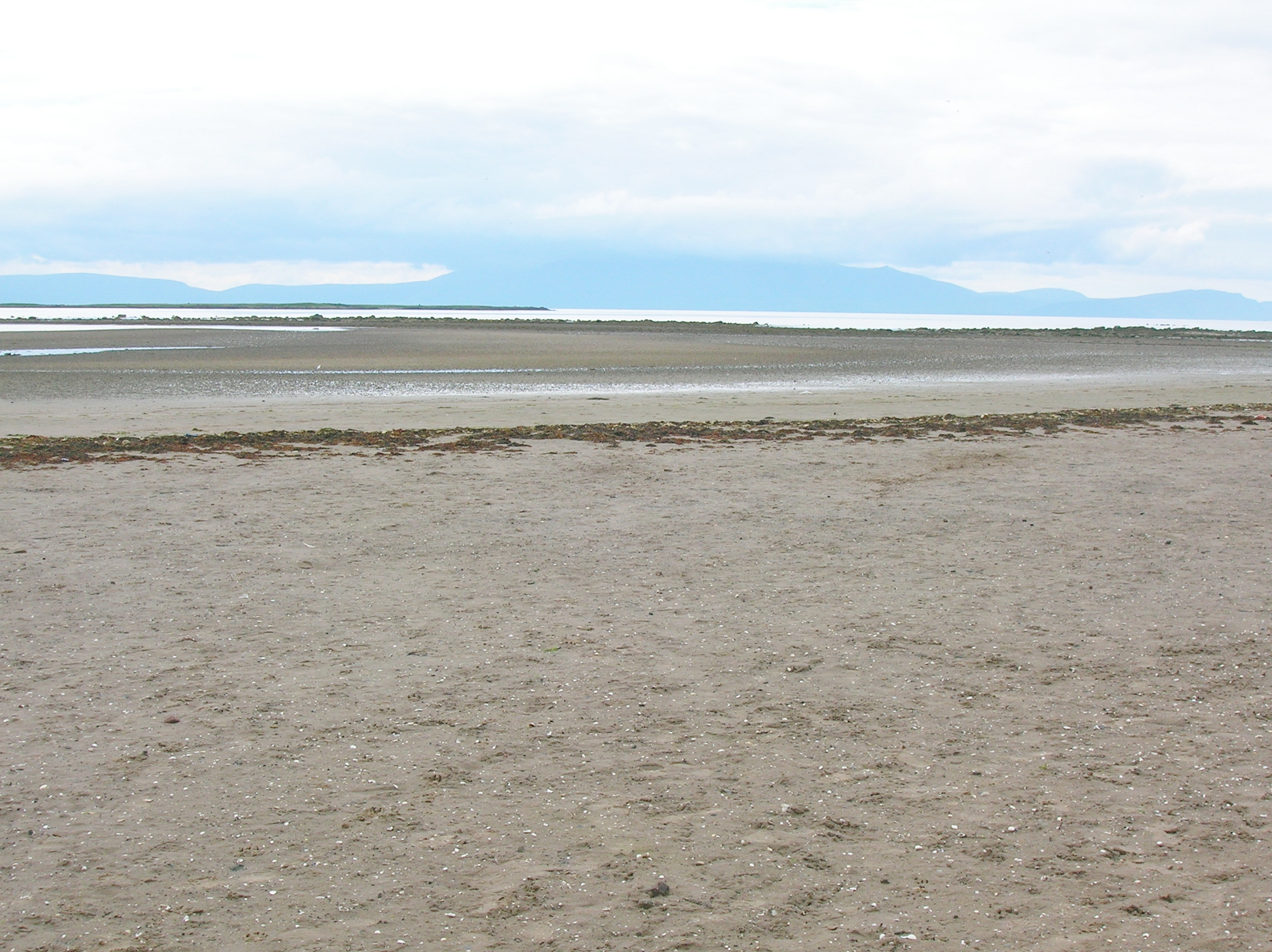
Ardrossan North Bay - The site of the murder of Lord Eglinton.

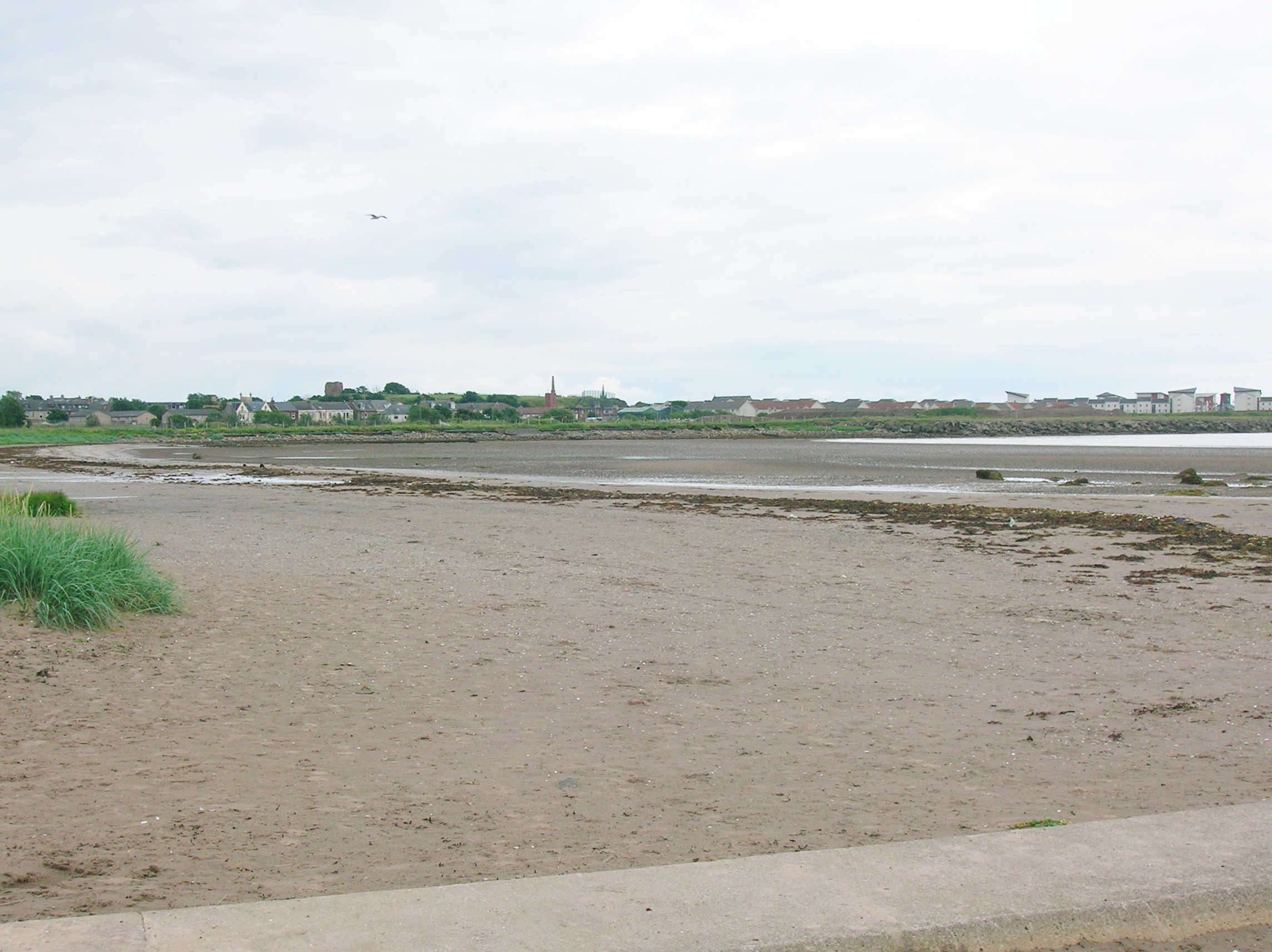
The area of North Bay in which Alexander Bartlyemore was caught smuggling by Mungo Campbell.

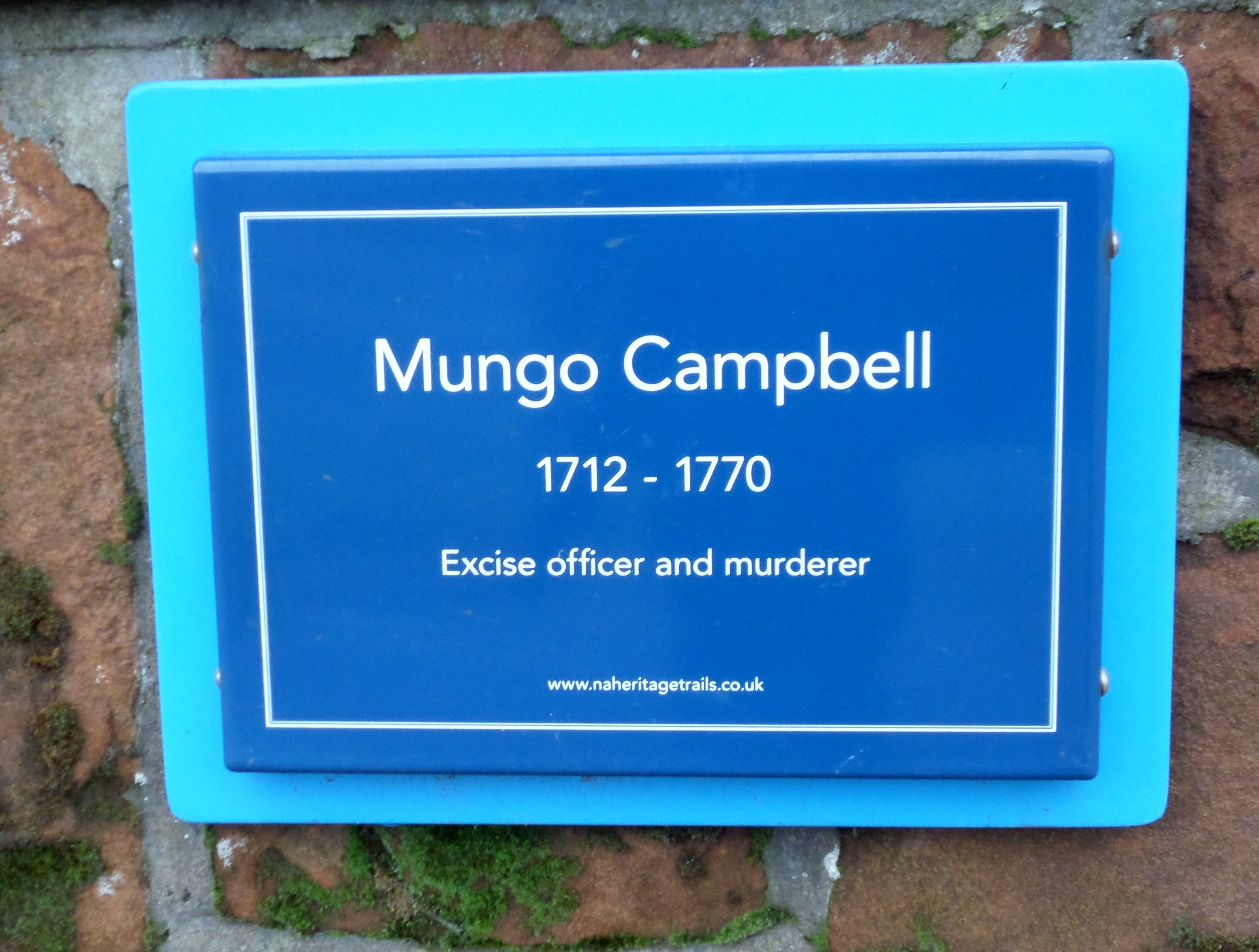
Plaque on the Ardrossan Heritage Trail commemorating Mungo Campbell.

=== Literary heritage ===
The incident was written into a novel by John Galt, the well known story of fictitious Ayrshire village life, Annals of the Parish.

In 1770, A Dialogue of the Dead : Betwixt Lord Eglinton and Mungo Campbell was published. This argues the rights of the common man over those of the aristocracy without coming to any form of reconciliation.

John Service records a semi-fictional version in his book The Memorables of Robin Cummell.

== Micro-history ==
Mr Reid of Bonshaw's collection of historical artifacts is said to have included the stirrups from the horse that The 10th Earl of Eglinton was riding when he was shot and killed by Mungo Campbell.

North Ayrshire Council commemorated the incident in 2014 with a plaque on the Montfode Burn bridge and a 'QR' linking to web-based information about Mungo Campbell and Lord Eglinton.

== See also ==
- Eglinton Castle
- Montfode Castle
- Susanna, Countess of Eglinton
