= Alexander Montgomerie, 10th Earl of Eglinton =

Scottish peer (1723–1769)

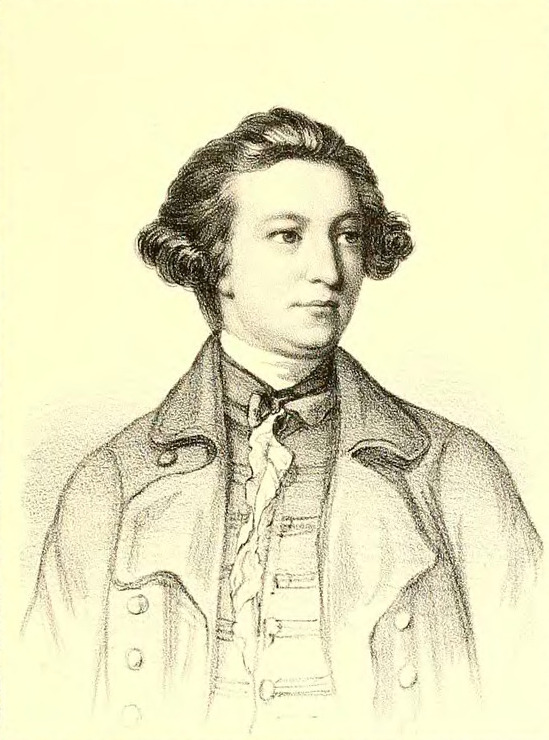

10th Earl of Eglinton
- In office 1729–1769
- Succeeded by: Archibald Montgomerie

Personal details
- Born: 10 February 1723
- Died: 25 October 1769 (aged 46)
- Parents: Alexander Montgomerie, 9th Earl of Eglinton; Susanna, Countess of Eglinton

Alexander Montgomerie, 10th Earl of Eglinton (10 February 1723 – 25 October 1769), was a Scottish peer.

Eglinton was the son of The 9th Earl of Eglinton. His mother, who was the third wife of the 9th Earl, was Susanna, Countess of Eglinton, the society beauty. He was the Grand Master Mason of the Grand Lodge of Scotland from 1750 to 1751.

Lord Eglinton was one of the first of the Scottish landowners to carry out improvements on his estates. He planned and built the conservation village of Eaglesham, Renfrewshire, in 1769 around the basic plan of a capital 'A'. The Earl introduced the young James Boswell to the joys of London society in the early 1760s, and figures prominently in Boswells London Journal, 1762-63.

The Earl was shot on the beach near his own estate of Ardrossan by an excise officer or Gaudger (Scots) named Mungo Campbell on 24 October 1769 following a dispute about the latter's right to bear arms on the Earl's grounds. The Earl died from his abdominal wounds late that evening. Campbell was convicted of murder but died by his own hand before the sentence could be carried out.

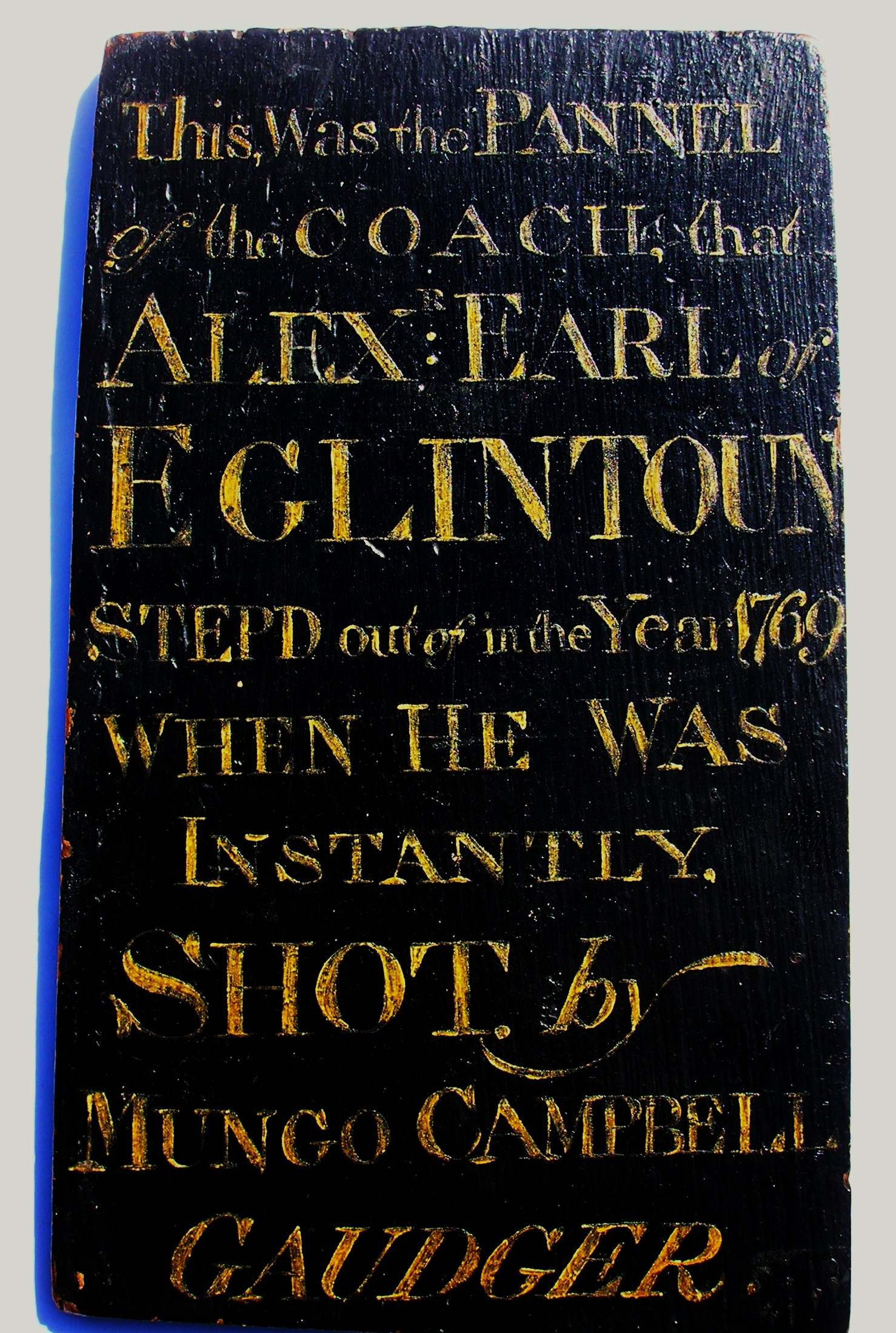
A panel from the coach in which the 10th Earl travelled during the Mungo Campbell incident.

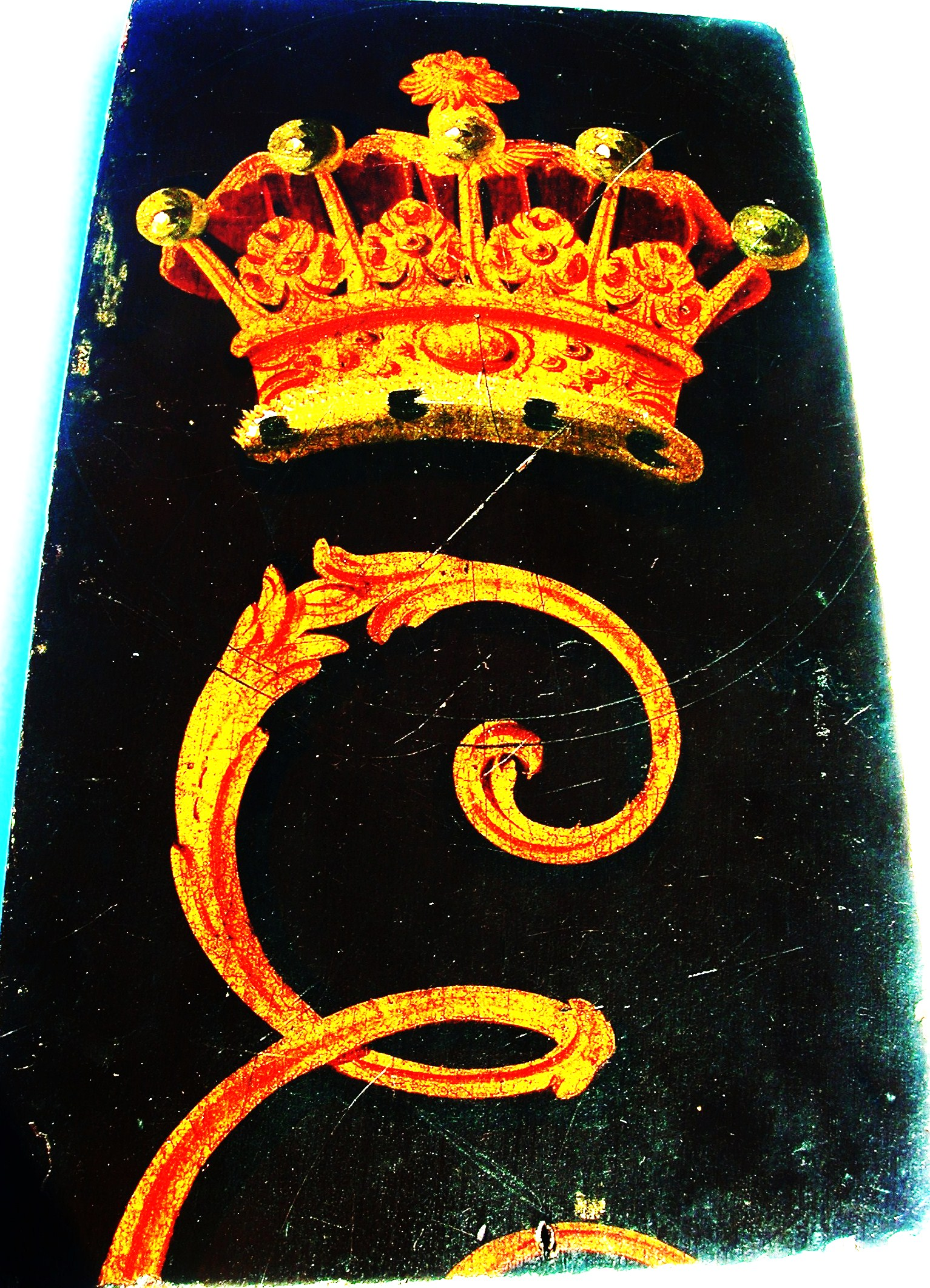
The outside facing side of the panel from the coach in which the 10th Earl travelled during the Mungo Campbell incident.

Masonic offices
Preceded by Lord Erskine	Grand Master of the Grand Lodge of Scotland; 1750–1751	Succeeded by The Earl of Erroll
Court offices
Preceded by	Lord of the Bedchamber; 1760–1767	Succeeded by The Lord Botetourt
Peerage of Scotland
Preceded by Alexander Montgomerie	Earl of Eglinton; 1729–1769	Succeeded by Archibald Montgomerie
