= Archibald Montgomerie, 11th Earl of Eglinton =

Scottish general and member of parliament (1726 – 1796)

General The Right Honourable Archibald Montgomerie
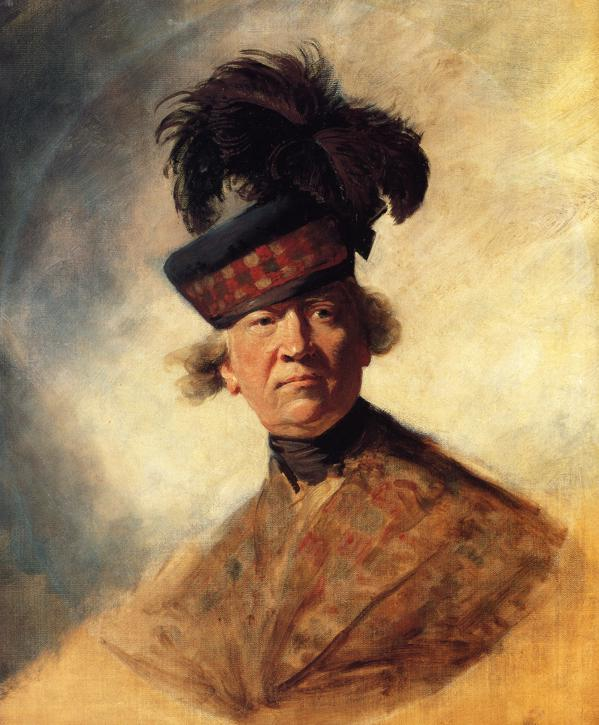

Member of Parliament for Ayrshire
- In office 1761–1762

Member of Parliament for Wigtown Burghs
- In office 1761–1768

Personal details
- Born: 8 May 1726 Ayrshire, Scotland
- Died: 30 October 1796 (aged 70) Eglinton Castle, Scotland
- Party: Whig
- Spouses: Jean (Jane) Lindsay (1772–1778); Frances Twysden (1783–1796)
- Parents: Alexander Montgomerie, 9th Earl of Eglinton; Susanna Kennedy
- Education: Eton; Winchester College

Military service
- Allegiance: Great Britain
- Commands: Montgomerie's Highlanders
- Battles/wars: Seven Years' War; Battle of Fort Duquesne; Anglo-Cherokee War; Battle of Echoee; Siege of Fort Loudoun

Archibald Montgomerie, 11th Earl of Eglinton (18 May 1726 – 30 October 1796) was a Scottish General and member of parliament (MP) in the British Parliament. He was also the Clan Chief of the Clan Montgomery. Montgomerie fought in the Seven Years' War, where he served with George Washington. He was the patron of the poet Robert Burns.

== Early life ==
Archibald Montgomerie was born on 18 May 1726 to Alexander Montgomerie, 9th Earl of Eglinton, and the 9th Earl's third wife, Susanna Kennedy. Montgomerie was one of the 9th Earl's twenty children. Montgomerie was educated at Eton during his teenage years and then went to Winchester College. At age 13, Montgomerie joined the army.

== Military career ==
After joining the army, Montgomerie received a commission as a cornet in the Royal Scots Greys. He served in this rank from 1739 to 1740. He became Major of the 36th Regiment in 1751, and was elected lieutenant-colonel of the regiment on 4 January 1757. At the outbreak of the Seven Years' War, Montgomerie raised the Montgomerie's Highlanders. The regiment traveled to the American Colonies in 1757, and Montgomerie was put under the command of General Amherst. Montgomerie and his regiment, along with George Washington and Henry Bouquet, joined the expedition against Fort Duquesne in 1758. In 1760, he commanded an expedition against the Cherokee during the Anglo-Cherokee War. Montgomerie's expedition, which included 1,200 men, was ultimately unsuccessful in its mission but succeeded in reaping mass devastation on lower Cherokee country. Montgomerie led an assault on the Cherokee Lower Towns and had several Cherokee villages destroyed, including the major town of Keowee. He was defeated by the Cherokees, in 1760, at the Battle of Echoee and was forced to retreat back to Fort Prince George, failing in his mission to relieve the siege at Fort Loudoun.

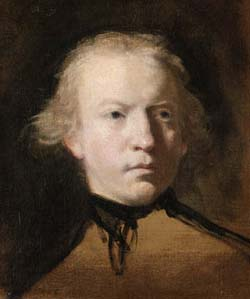
Archibald Montgomerie, by Sir Joshua Reynolds

Between 1767 and 1795, Montgomerie was the Colonel of the 51st Regiment of Foot. During his service with the 51st, Montgomerie fought in the French Revolutionary Wars. He rose through the ranks of the British Military and became a major general in 1772. He was Deputy Vice-Admiral of Irvine in 1777, within the Port of Irvine from Kelly Bridge to the Troon Point. He subsequently became a lieutenant general, in 1777, and in 1793 was commissioned a Full General. From 1795 until 1796, Montgomerie was the colonel of the Royal Scots Greys (2nd Dragoons).

== Political career and Earldom ==
Montgomerie stood as a Whig in 1761 and was elected to two seats. He chose to give up Wigtown Burghs to sit in the seat for Ayrshire, and served in the House of Commons from 1761 to 1768. In 1761, Montgomerie became an Equerry for Queen Charlotte. He was appointed Governor of Dumbarton Castle in 1764 and Deputy Ranger of St. James's Park and Deputy Ranger of Hyde Park in 1766.

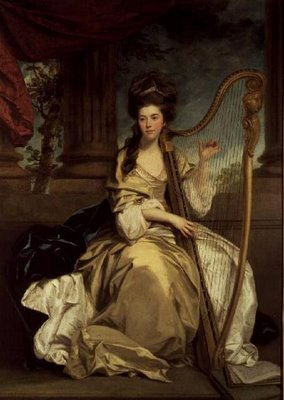
Montgomerie's first wife Lady Jean (Jane) Lindsay.

On 24 October 1769, Montgomerie's brother, Alexander Montgomerie, 10th Earl of Eglinton, was murdered by Mungo Campbell, after a dispute on whether or not Campbell could bear arms on the 10th Earl's property. The 10th Earl died in the early morning hours of 25 October 1769, and Montgomerie inherited the Earldom.

He was Grand Master of the Masonic Lodge of Mother Kilwinning, from 1771 until 1796. Montgomerie was elected as one of sixteen Scottish representative peers in 1776 and was re-elected in 1780, 1784, and 1790. Montgomerie was appointed Governor of Edinburgh Castle, in 1782, and served as Lord Lieutenant of Ayrshire between 1794 and 1796. Montgomerie was also the patron to the poet Robert Burns; Burns and Montgomerie kept in contact until the latter's death.

Montgomerie died on 30 October 1796 at Eglinton Castle. The Earldom passed to a third cousin, Hugh Montgomerie, 12th Earl of Eglinton. However, the majority of Archibald Montgomerie's wealth went to his daughter Mary, whose son eventually became the 13th Earl of Eglinton.

There is a portrait of Montgomerie in Windsor Castle. It was offered back to the family by King William IV, but the 13th Earl declined. He felt that it was an honour to have a portrait of his grandfather at Windsor Castle.

== Personal life ==
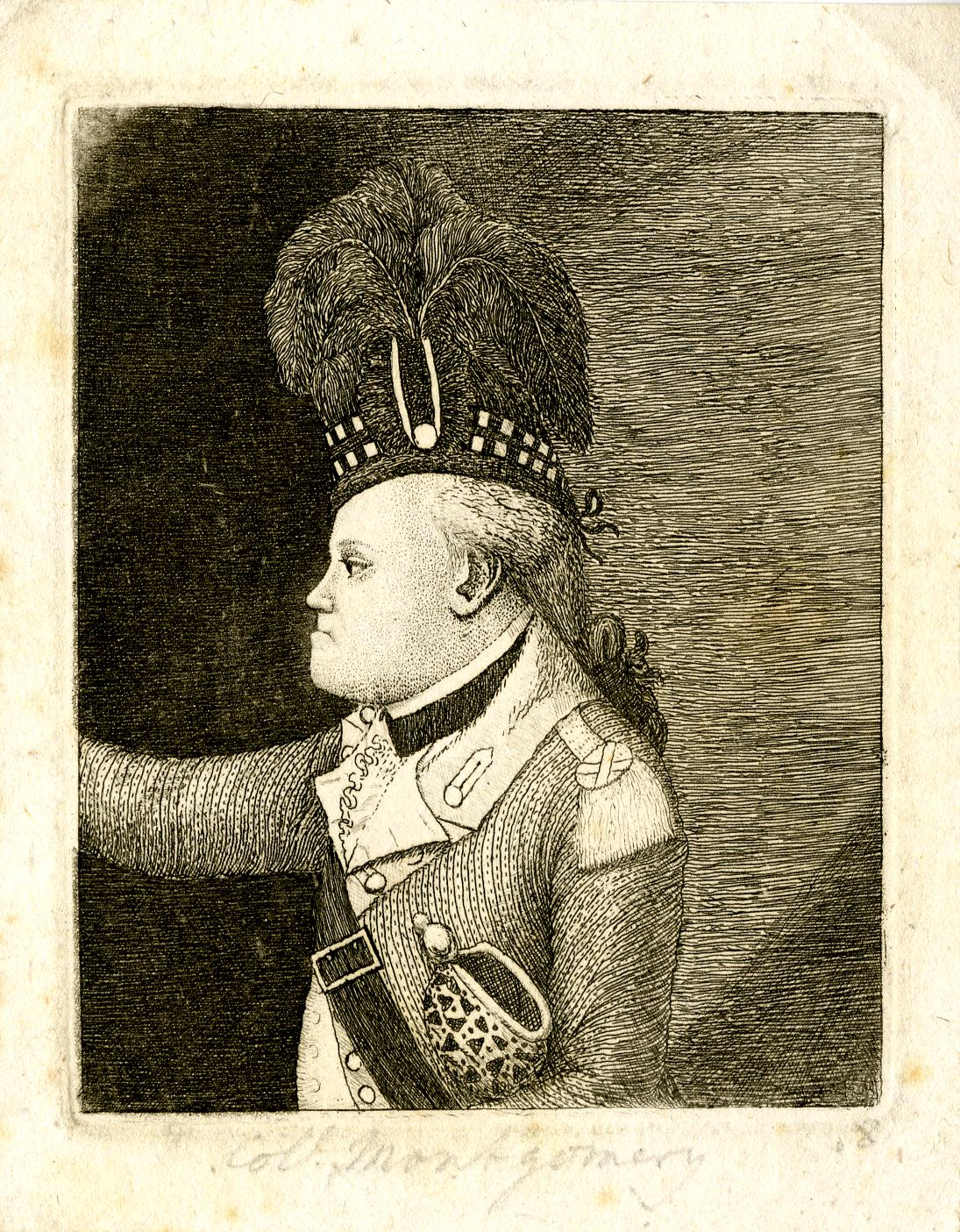
Caricature by John Kay

Montgomerie was married twice. He was first married, to Lady Jean (Jane) Lindsay, who was the daughter of George Lindsay-Crawford, 21st Earl of Crawford and Jean Hamilton, on 30 March 1772. Jean died in 1778 without issue.

On 9 August 1783, Montgomerie married Frances Twysden, the daughter of Sir William Twysden, 6th Baronet and Mary Jervis, as his second wife. They divorced on 6 February 1788 on account on her affair with Douglas Hamilton, 8th Duke of Hamilton with whom she allegedly had a daughter.

He and Frances had two children:

1. Lady Mary Montgomerie (5 March 1787 – 12 Jun 1848). Mary was married to Lord Hugh Montgomerie. Their son, Archibald Montgomerie, 13th Earl of Eglinton, would eventually succeed to the Earldom. It is through Mary that the lineal and male lines of the Montgomerie family would unite, which would return the Earldom of Eglinton to her descendants. After Lord Hugh's death, she married Sir Charles Lamb, 2nd Baronet, with whom she had a further son, Charles James Savile Montgomerie Lamb, father of the 3rd Baronet and of Violet Fane (Mary Montgomerie, Lady Currie). Following Lady Mary's death, Sir Charles built a monument to her memory at his estate at Beauport Park in Sussex.
2. Lady Susanna Montgomerie (26 May 1788 – 16 Nov 1805). Susanna died unmarried. Her real father may have been Douglas Hamilton.

== See also ==
- Clan Montgomery
- Barony and Castle of Giffen
- Eglinton Castle

== Notes ==
Parliament of Great Britain
Preceded by James Mure-Campbell	Member of Parliament for Ayrshire; 1761–1768	Succeeded by David Kennedy
Preceded by John Hamilton	Member of Parliament for Wigtown Burghs; 1761–1762	Succeeded by Keith Stewart
Military offices
Preceded by The Earl of Loudoun	Governor of Edinburgh Castle; 1782–1796	Succeeded by Lord Adam Gordon
Preceded by James Johnston	Colonel of the 2nd (Royal North British) Regiment of Dragoons; 1795–1796	Succeeded by Sir Ralph Abercromby
Preceded by Thomas Brudenell	Colonel of the 51st Regiment of Foot; 1767–1795	Succeeded by Anthony George Martin
Honorary titles
New office	Lord Lieutenant of Ayrshire; 1794–1796	Succeeded by The Earl of Eglinton
Peerage of Scotland
Preceded by Alexander Montgomerie	Earl of Eglinton; 1769–1796	Succeeded by Hugh Montgomerie
