= Susanna Montgomerie, Countess of Eglinton =

Scottish literary patron and society hostess

The Right Honourable The Countess of Eglinton
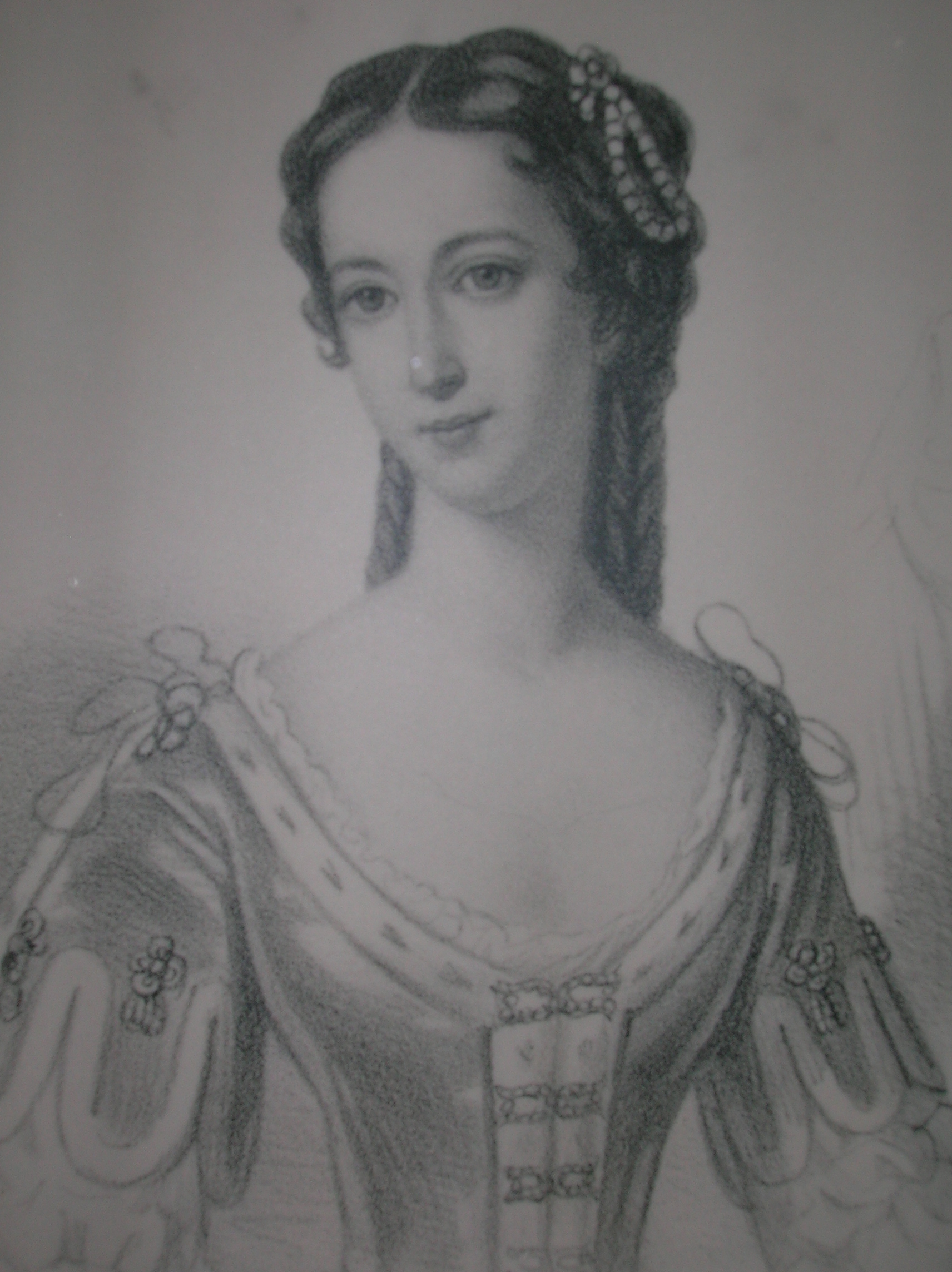
- Lady Eglinton
- Full name: Susanna Kennedy
- Born: 1 January 1690; Culzean Castle
- Died: 18 March 1780 (aged 90); Auchans Castle
- Buried: Kilwinning
- Noble family: Kennedy
- Spouse: Alexander Montgomerie, 9th Earl of Eglinton (m. 1709; died 1729)
- Issue More: 3 sons and 8 daughters: James, Lord Montgomerie; Alexander, 10th Earl of Eglinton; Archibald, 11th Earl of Eglinton; Lady Elizabeth Montgomerie; Lady Helen Montgomerie; Lady Susan Montgomerie; Lady Margaret Montgomerie; Lady Christian Montgomerie; Lady Charlotte Montgomerie; Lady Grace Montgomerie; Lady Frances Montgomerie
- Father: Sir Archibald Kennedy, 1st Bt.
- Mother: Hon. Elizabeth Leslie

Susanna Montgomerie, Countess of Eglinton (1690 – 18 March 1780) was the third wife of Alexander Montgomerie, 9th Earl of Eglinton. She lived as a widow for nearly 51 years before dying at Auchans, Scotland in 1780, aged 90. She signed herself as S. Eglintoune.

== Background ==
Born at Culzean Castle in 1690, Lady Eglinton was the daughter of Sir Archibald Kennedy, 1st Baronet of Culzean, and the Hon. Elizabeth Leslie, daughter of David Leslie, 1st Lord Newark.

== Personal qualities, marriage and anecdotes ==
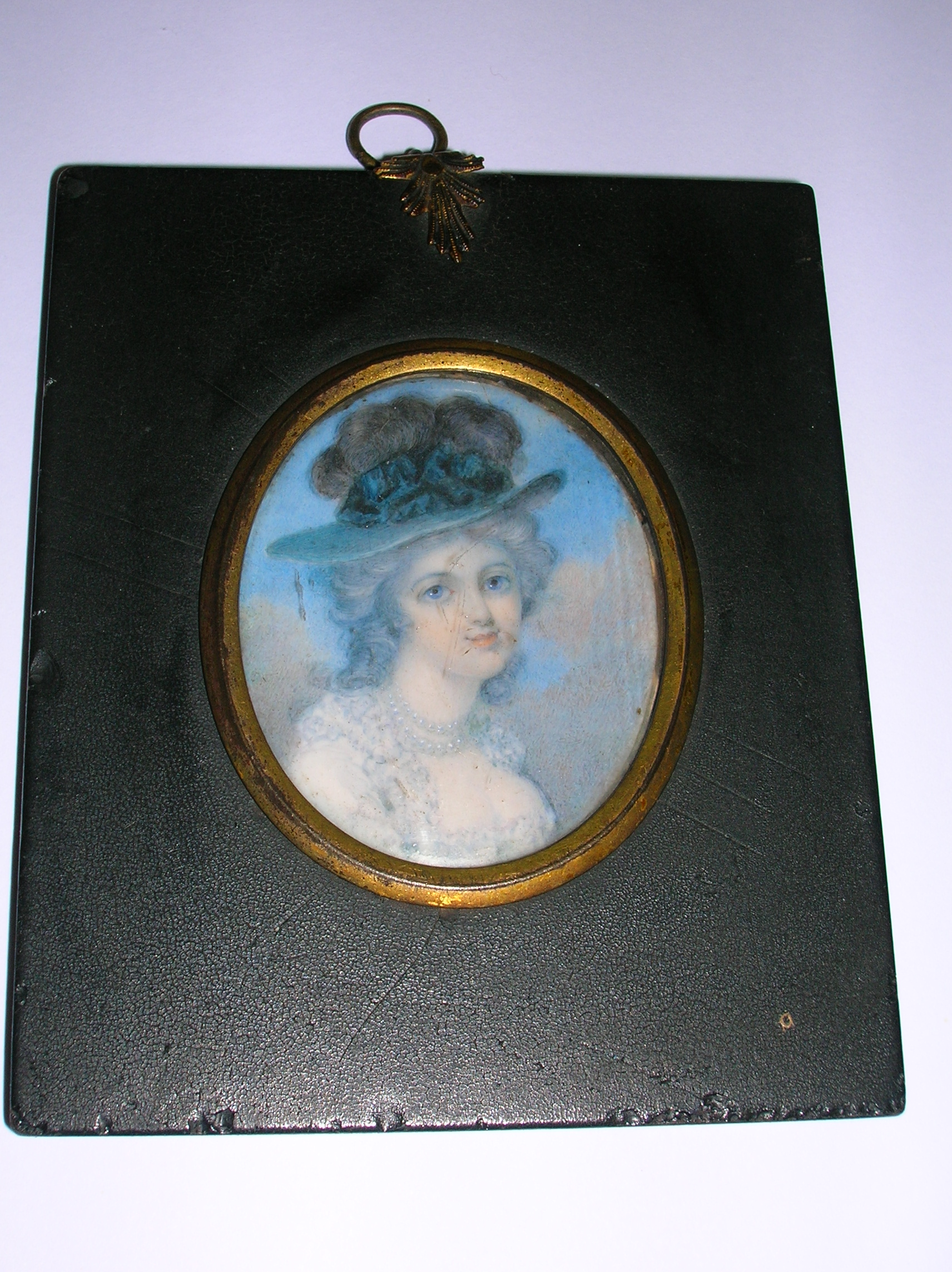
Susanna Montgomery, Countess of Eglinton

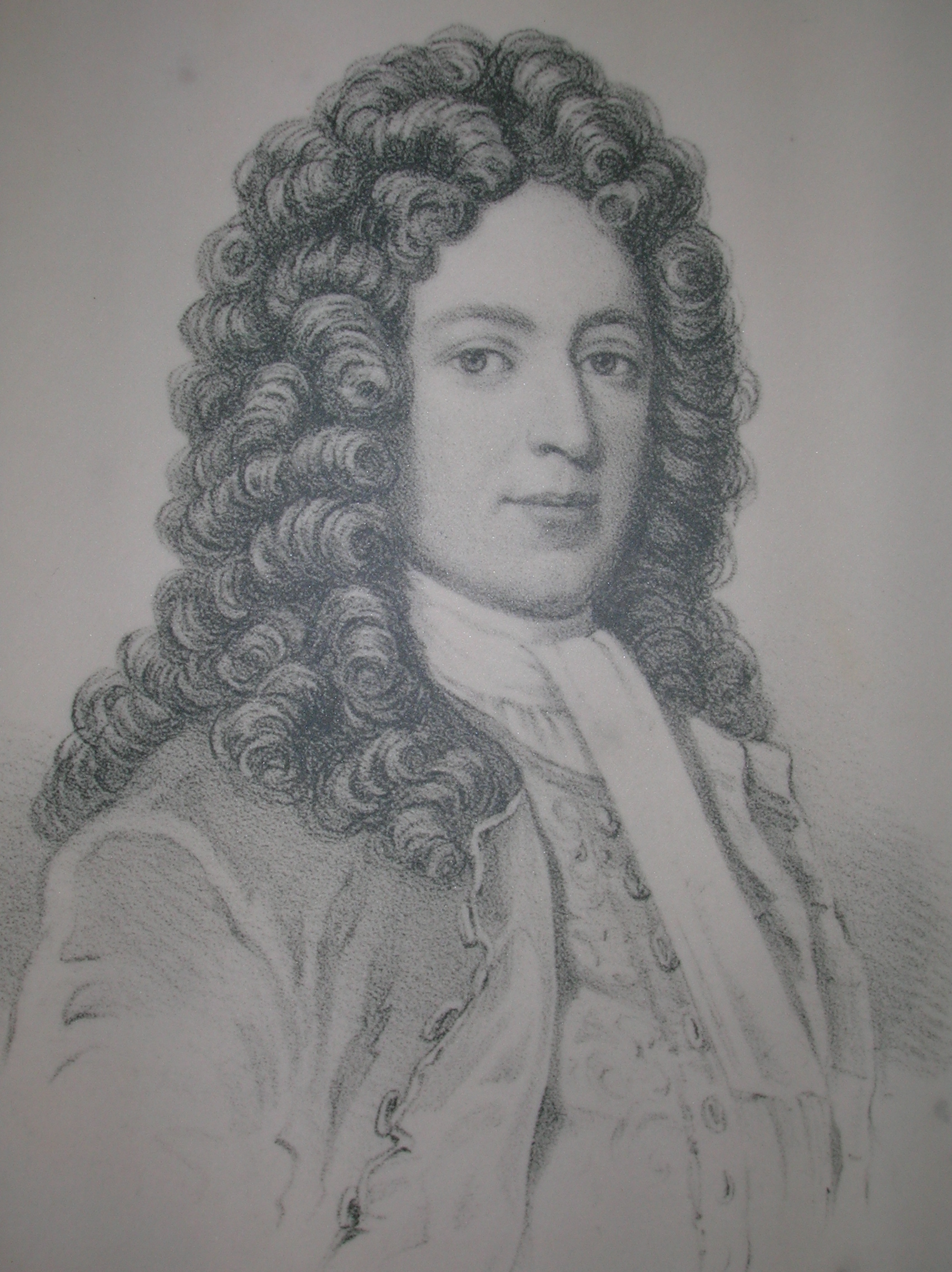
Alexander Montgomery, 9th Earl of Eglinton

Lady Eglinton was celebrated for her beauty and height (6 feet), and for her patronage of the Scottish poets and writers of her day. She was exceptional in her knowledge of art, music, literature, science, philosophy and history; additionally she spoke Italian, French and German. Her interest in literature was seen by her contemporaries to be distinctly odd for one of her station. Sir William Fraser, the Scottish historian, said that "to her loveliness were added the more valuable attractions of genius and great accomplishment." Fullarton suggests that Susanna's personality owed much to her maternal grandfather, General David Leslie, later Lord Newark; he was second in command at the Battle of Marston moor and in command at the Battle of Philiphaugh, on the winning side at both encounters.

She was beautiful and at 6-foot, unusually tall for those times. It is stated that, on her arrival with her father in Edinburgh around the time of the Union (1702), she was surrounded by wooers. One of these, Sir John Clerk, baronet, of Pennycuik, was deemed likeliest to succeed, but was unsuccessful. She instead married the 9th Earl in June 1709. When Susanna's father consulted him as to the propriety of the match, the earl, whose second countess was then alive but in a long-continued state of ill health, purportedly replied, "Bide awee, Sir Archie, my wife’s very sickly." Soon afterwards his second wife died of natural causes and he married again, this being to his third countess. Susanna did not immediately accept, but the earl eventually won through in spite of numerous rivals. One story relates that she had long been destined to marry the 9th Earl, for one day whilst out walking at Culzean, a hawk belonging to the Earl landed on her shoulder when she called to it and those observing saw it as a clear omen once the silver bells around its neck were seen to carry the name of the earl.

She was married for 20 years and a widow at the age of 40, living for another 51 years. She brought to the family a way of walking in a stately fashion which became known as 'the Eglinton air'.

The Gentle Shepherd, first published in 1725, was dedicated to her by Allan Ramsay and Hamilton of Bangour wrote flattering verse to Susanna, Lady Eglinton and her daughters. A roundelay entitled The Lovely Eglintoune became well-known throughout Scotland, being composed by Hamilton of Bangour. Ramsay referred to her penetration, superior wit and sound judgement ........ accompanied with the diviner charms of goodness and equality of mind. Samuel Boyse dedicated a volume of poems to her. Several other publications of the period were inscribed to her, and to her Ramsay also dedicated the music of his first book of songs. At a later period he presented to the countess the original manuscript of his great pastoral poem, which she afterwards gave to James Boswell, and it was for many years preserved in the library at Auchinleck House, along with the presentation letter of the poet.

The Gentle Shepherd

Paraphrased by Hamilton of Bangour.

Oh Eglintoun! thy happy breast,
Calm and serene enjoys the heavenly guest;
From the tumultuous rule of passions freed,
Pure in thy thought, and spotless in thy deed;
In virtues rich, in goodness unconfin'd,
Thou shin'st a fair example to thy kind.

She briefly attended the court of King George II in 1730 and had caught the eye of the Queen, Caroline of Ansbach. King George II described her as the most beautiful woman in my dominions. Susanna's special entertainments were magnificent and it was said that they were seldom if ever equalled in any private mansion. She refused to attend the procession at the coronation of King George III in 1760 because of her Jacobite sympathies.

Susanna retained her figure and complexion until her death, supposedly because she never used paint or cosmetics and daily washed her face with sow's milk and drank it, recommending this treatment to others. Her eyes' colour, however, went from the blue of forget-me-not to the light blue of speedwells. She once said to her daughter, Lady Bettie, "What would you give to be as pretty as I am?" to which Lady Bettie replied, "Not half as much as you would give to be as young as I am." Cummell in her lifetime recorded that her complexion was like "rhododendron and rose flowers dipped in milk." Her daughter Helen once commented, "Who can surpass Mama? She has not aged a day in fourty years." It was believed that Susanna had discovered the secret of eternal youth, showing no signs of her beauty lessening even at the age of sixty.

When she and her daughters were in Edinburgh, the caddies at the Cross were said to be dumbfounded by their beauty as they stepped from their sedan chairs.

Paterson records that "Susanna Countess of Eglintoun was amiable, accomplished and beautiful. A portrait of her ladyship when young was in the possession of the late Mr Sharpe. He had also a miniature of her in her 81st year, when she was a fine looking, stout old lady. Her blue eyes grew lighter in colour as she advanced in years." Her portrait still hangs in Culzean Castle.

Dr. Robert Chambers recorded that "In her bed-rooms was hung a portrait of her sovereign de jure (in principle), the ill-starred Charles Edward, so situated as to be the first object which met her sight on awaking in the morning." Her husband had been a covert Jacobite.

A full-length portrait (97" by 53") of Susanna as Countess in her robes was painted by Allan Ramsay and was sold at the 1925 auction of the contents of Eglinton Castle. Allan was the eldest son of Allan Ramsay the poet, who had dedicated 'The Gentle Shepherd' to Susanna. This painting now hangs in Culzean Castle.

Robert Campbell (Cummell) records that Quintin Crawfurd was Lady Susanna's factor.

=== Involvement in industry ===
The Montgomerie family owned a number of coal mines or pits and Susanna was involved in the general supervision of miners on the estate as shown by her correspondence and the fact that she intervened in the 1749–50 labour unrest. The miners at this time claimed that they were forced to work a 14-hour day, six days a week in order to earn a living wage.

Susanna summoned the miners to Eglinton Castle to try and sort things out, as a result of which several of the miners signed a 'disclamation' which they later tried to repudiate. The lawyer who dealt with the case stated that it is probable a Lady of great Beauty of Address might prevail with some of the old Coalziers to sign any paper.

She was very industrious and even established a distillery, later a brewery at the family's Burgh and Regality of Montgomeryston inside the walls of Cromwell's old Citadel fort at Ayr to increase her income. It seems to have been only moderately successful.

== Offspring and stepchildren ==
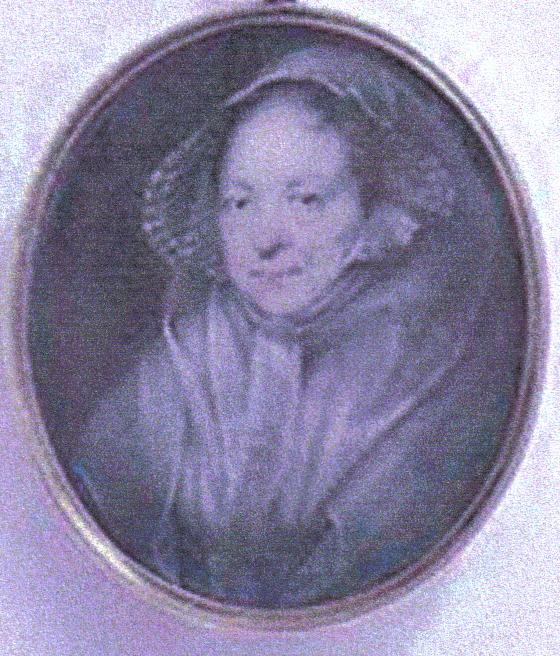
Lady Susanna in her 80s

She had three sons:

- James, Lord Montgomerie, who died young;
- Alexander, 10th Earl of Eglinton.
- Archibald, 11th Earl of Eglinton.

And eight daughters, who were all married but one.

- Lady Elizabeth married Sir John Cunningham of Caprington;
- Lady Helen married Francis Stuart of Pittendriech in 1745;
- Lady Susan married John Renton of Lamberton;
- Lady Margaret married Sir Alexander MacDonald in 1739;
- Lady Christian married James Moray of Abercairny;
- Lady Grace married Cornet Byrne, a debaucher and gambler, in 1751 and died in the same year;
- Lady Frances died unmarried.
- Lady Charlotte, who died suddenly of fever after having previously lost the use of her limbs.
- Lady Eleanor, who was frequently unwell and a special trip to the 'waters' at Bath did not cure her.
- Lady Susanna, who died of scurvy.

To them their handsome mother transmitted a nobleness of mien, distinguished at the period as the "Eglinton air." She had seven stepchildren through the earl's two previous marriages.

Two of her sons had smallpox and one had scarlet fever. Apart from Charlotte all her daughters lived long enough to marry and have children, however Susanna, the mother, outlived them all.

Lady Margaret MacDonald helped Flora MacDonald in her efforts to save Bonnie Prince Charlie whilst her husband was off fighting the Jacobites.

=== Death of her son Alexander, 10th Earl of Eglinton ===
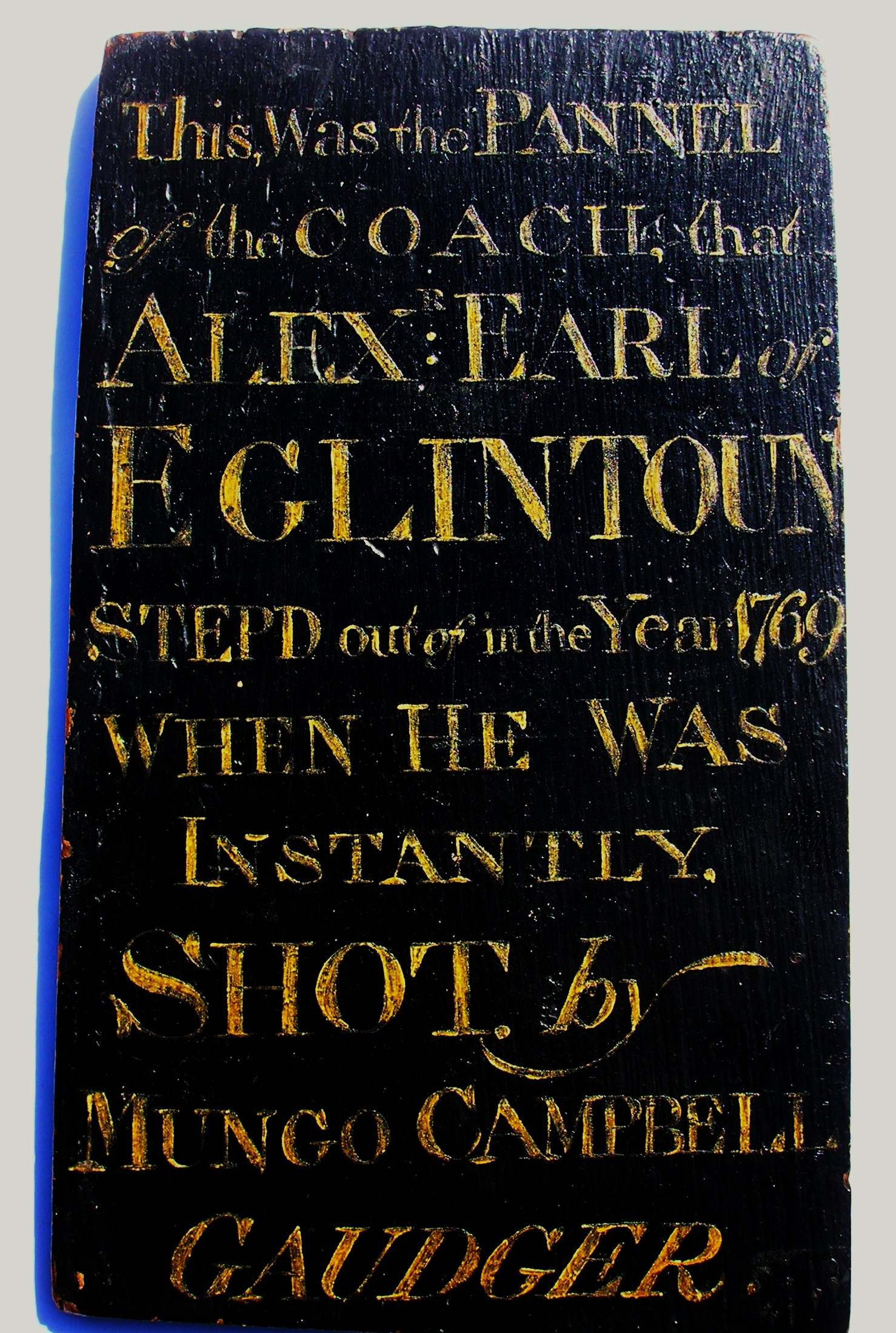
A panel from the coach in which the 10th Earl travelled during the Mungo Campbell incident.

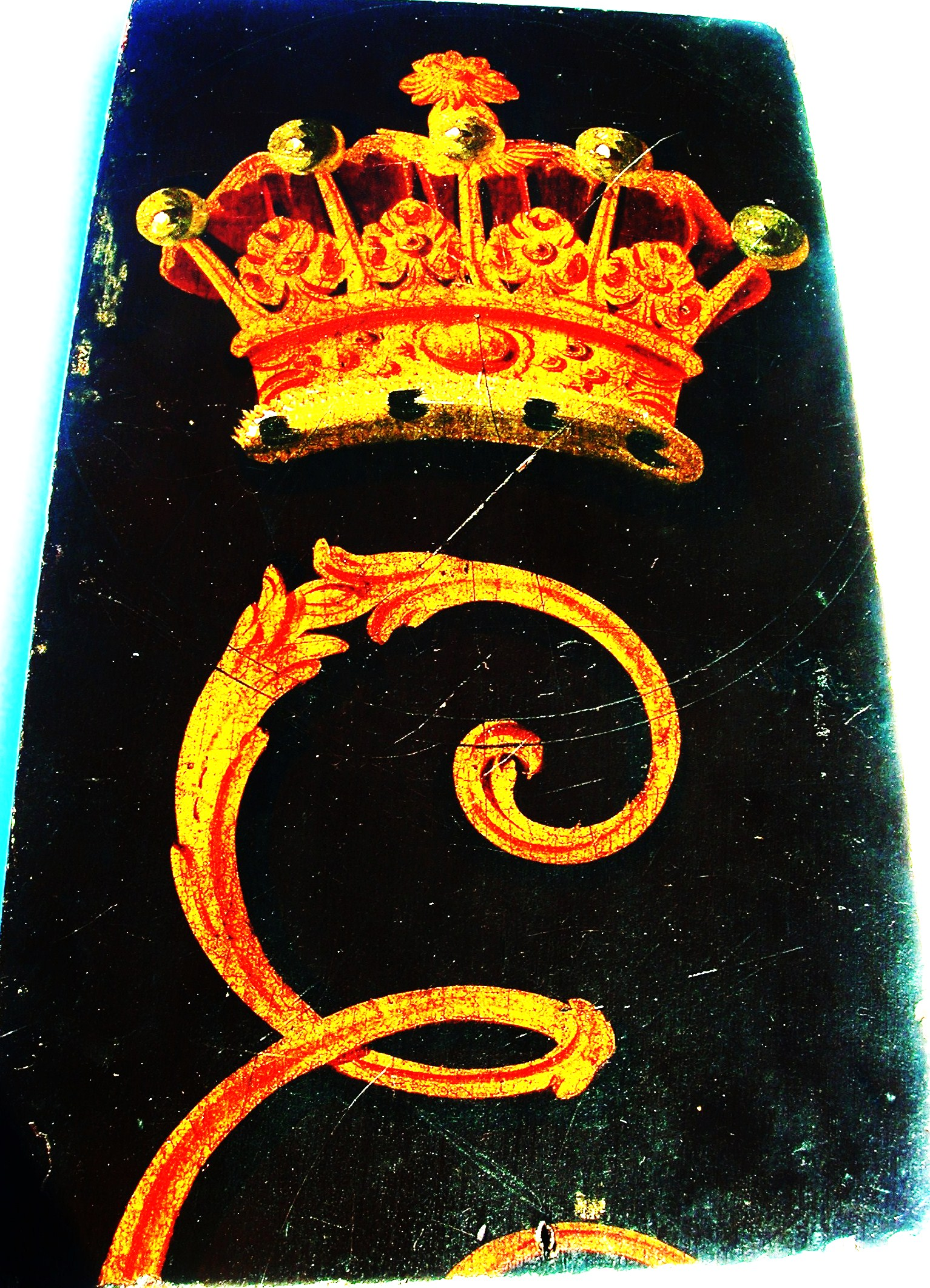
the outside facing side of the panel from the coach in which the 10th Earl travelled during the Mungo Campbell incident.

On 24 October 1769, near Ardrossan, travelling in his carriage and four servants following him, Alexander met two men, one of whom was Mungo Campbell, an officer of excise at Saltcoats, and son of a Provost of Ayr, one of twenty-four children. Alexander, as Mungo had previously been caught shooting game on his estates, asked Mungo to hand over the gun he was carrying, which he refused, saying that he would rather die. The earl then ordered his fowling-piece, which was not loaded, to be brought from the carriage and in the scuffle that ensued, Mungo fired at Lord Eglinton, who was mortally wounded in the bowels, and died ten hours later at about one o’clock the following morning, at Eglinton Castle, where he had been taken in his carriage. The preserved door pannel (sic) contradicts the stated course of events by stating that the Earl was instantly shot upon leaving his carriage.

A contemporary newspaper report first recorded the incident as actually being a duel over a woman in which the Earl had been worsted. Indeed, when in London (from 1760 to 1763 at the least) he stayed in Queen Street, Mayfair and according to Boswell, he kept a mistress, a Ms. or Mrs. Brown, who, in 1763, "had lived with him seven or eight years".

Mungo Campbell hanged himself and thereby cheated the hangman. He left the following note -

"Farewell, vain world, I've had enough of thee,
And now am careless what thou say'st of me,
Thy smiles I court not, nor thy frowns I fear,
My cares are past, my heart lies easy here,
What faults they find in me take care to shun,
And look at home, enough is to be done".

Susanna never quite recovered from the sight of her dying son being carried into Eglinton Castle and wrote I shall endeavour to bear my suffering with as little trouble to my fellow creatures as possible. Millar records that after the murder, she retired from the position which she held in society. She had insisted that the Earl was always referred to as Lord Eglinton as a youth and he had formally led her down to dinner every night. The murderer was tried before the high court of justiciary at Edinburgh, and condemned to death, but prevented a public execution by hanging himself in prison.

The Countess Susanna would have been further devastated by the attitude of many of the estate tenants who had more sympathy for Mungo Campbell than for the earl, and saw his death as a punishment imposed by heaven, due to the misimprovements of his life and the still more irritating improvement of his estates, his changes of old customs, his interference with old tenants. Mungo himself was also well liked in all the places that he had resided as an Excise officer, namely Stewarton, Saltcoats and Irvine.

Wilson records that "This sad affair, which took place on the grounds between Saltcoats and Ardrossan, was long the topic of discourse in town and country, .."

Dying unmarried, the earl was succeeded by his brother, Archibald. The carriage door, inscribed with the details of the tragedy, was retained by the Montgomerie family until the great sale of Eglinton Castle's contents in the 1920s. The incident was written into a novel by John Galt, the well known story of fictitious Ayrshire village life, Annals of the Parish.

== Correspondence ==
Susanna was a prolific letter writer if the 64 letters that have survived are any indication. She wrote in particular to her daughters, stepchildren, Lord Milton (the family Guardian appointed by her deceased husband), Andrew Fletcher of Salton and the Lord Justice Clerk.

== Dower houses ==
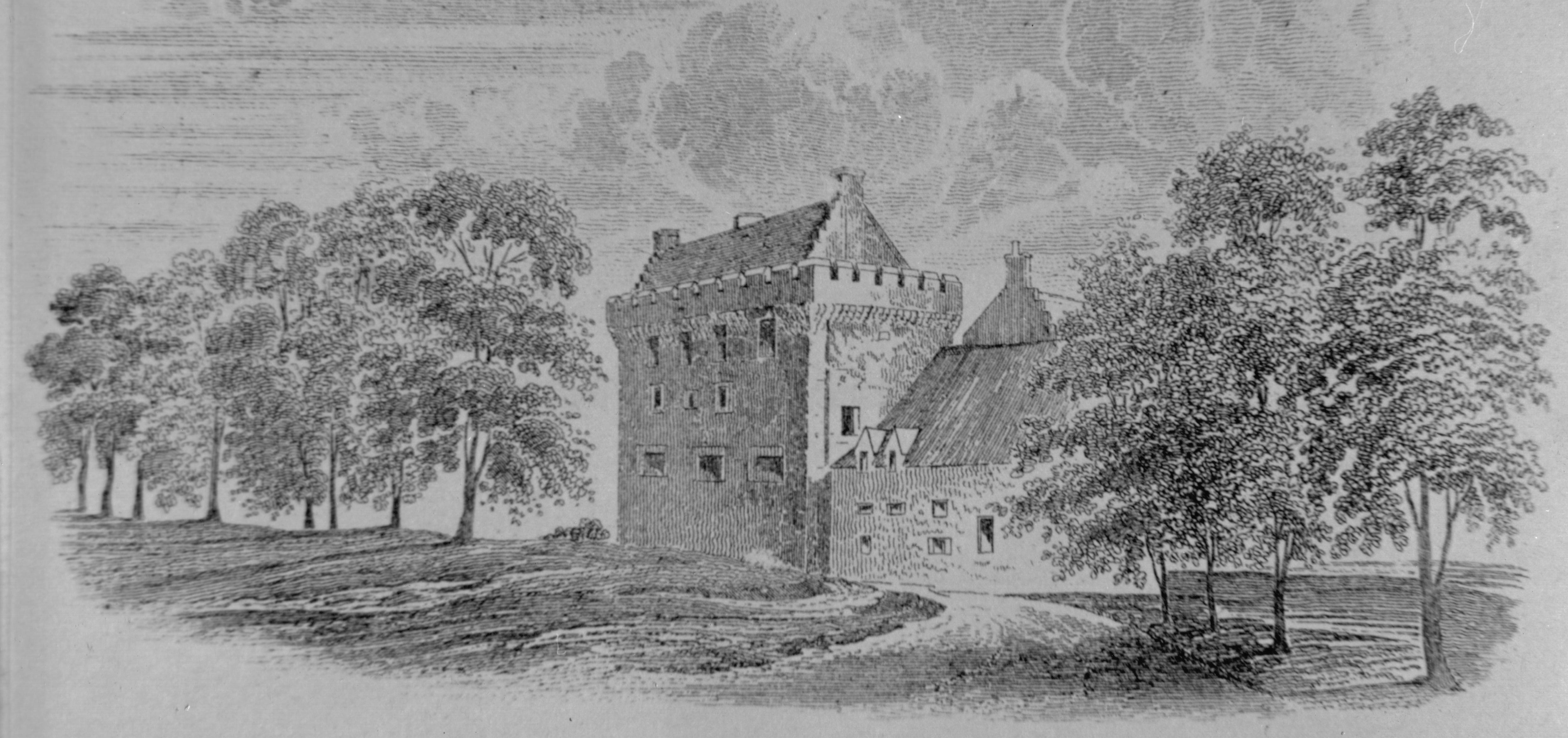
Eglintoune castle as it was during Susanna's lifetime

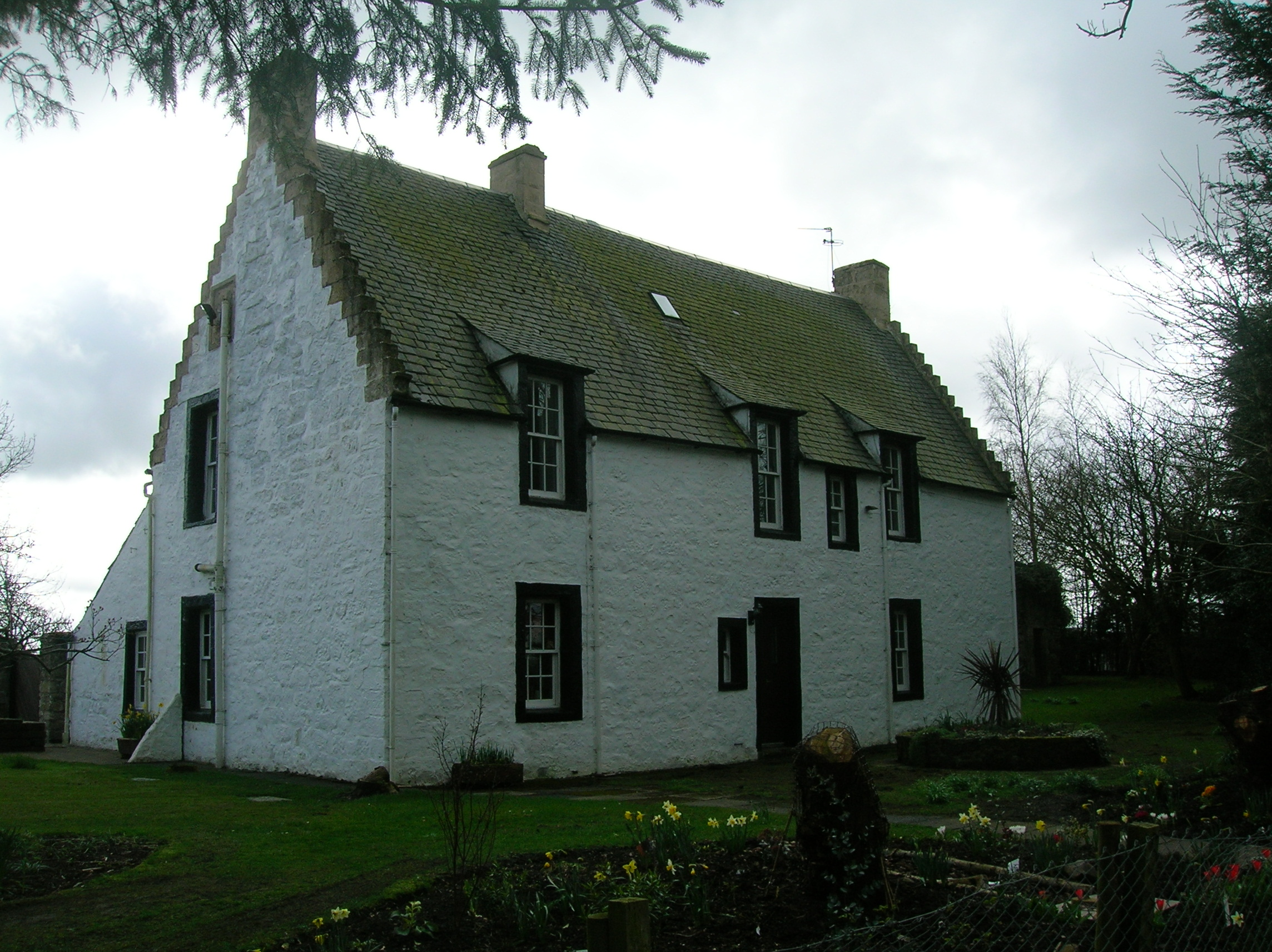
Kilmaurs Place.

It was traditional and practical for a dowager to move out of the family seat and dwell within a dower house. Susanna as dowager countess seems to have first moved to Kilmaurs Place in Kilmaurs, East Ayrshire and later moved to Auchans near Dundonald. Letters from 1751 to 1762 are recorded as being written at Kilmars (sic) and from 1765 they are recorded as being written at Auchans. In 1762 she writes in a letter to her son-in-law James Moray of Abercairney that her son (the tenth Earl) has given her Auchans House and that she was about to repair it. When her second son, Archibald (the 11th Earl) was married in 1772, she took up her residence permanently at Auchans, where she lived for eight years.

=== Auchans House views ===
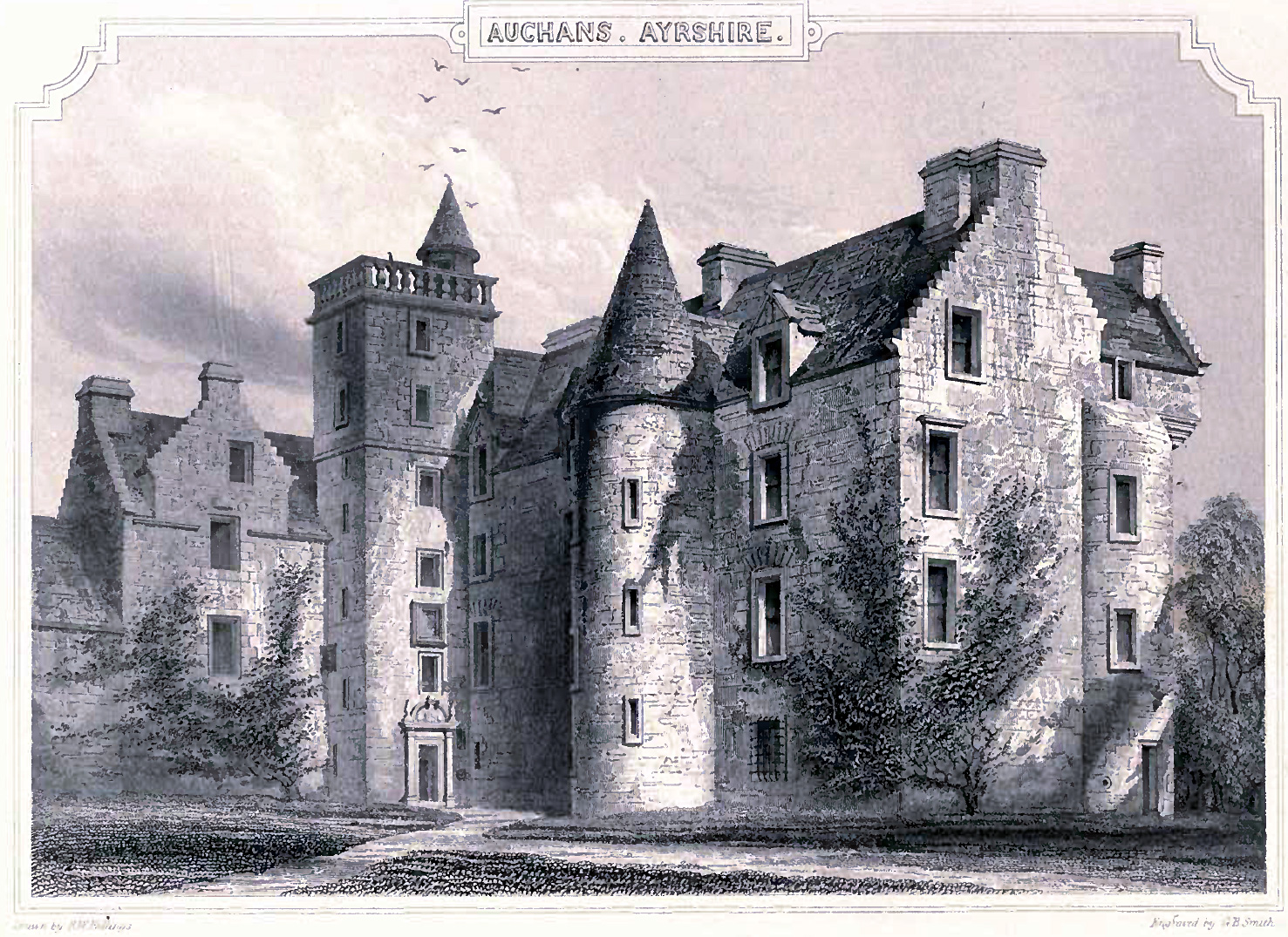
Auchans in the 19th century

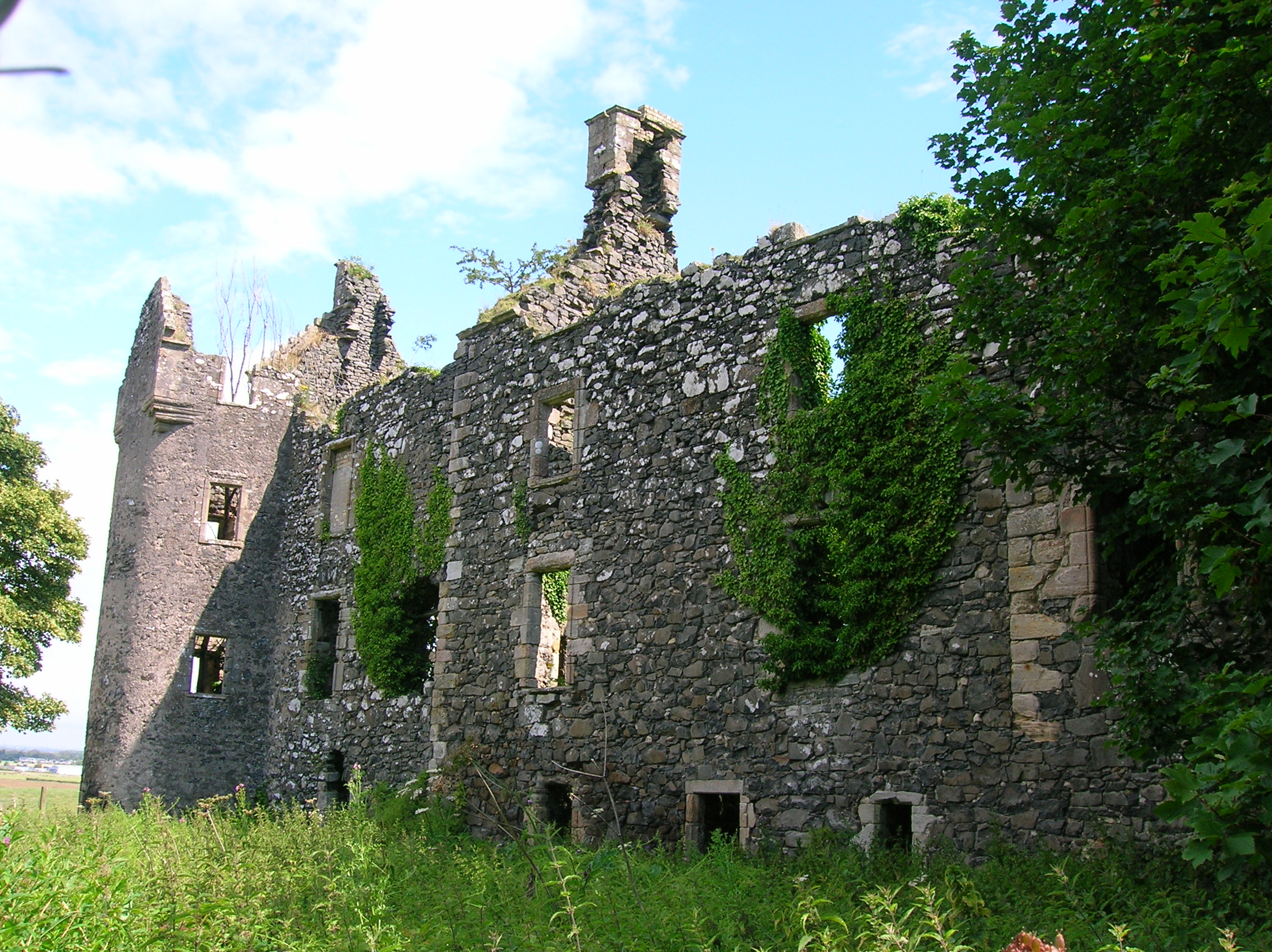
A view from the South-East of Auchans in 2009

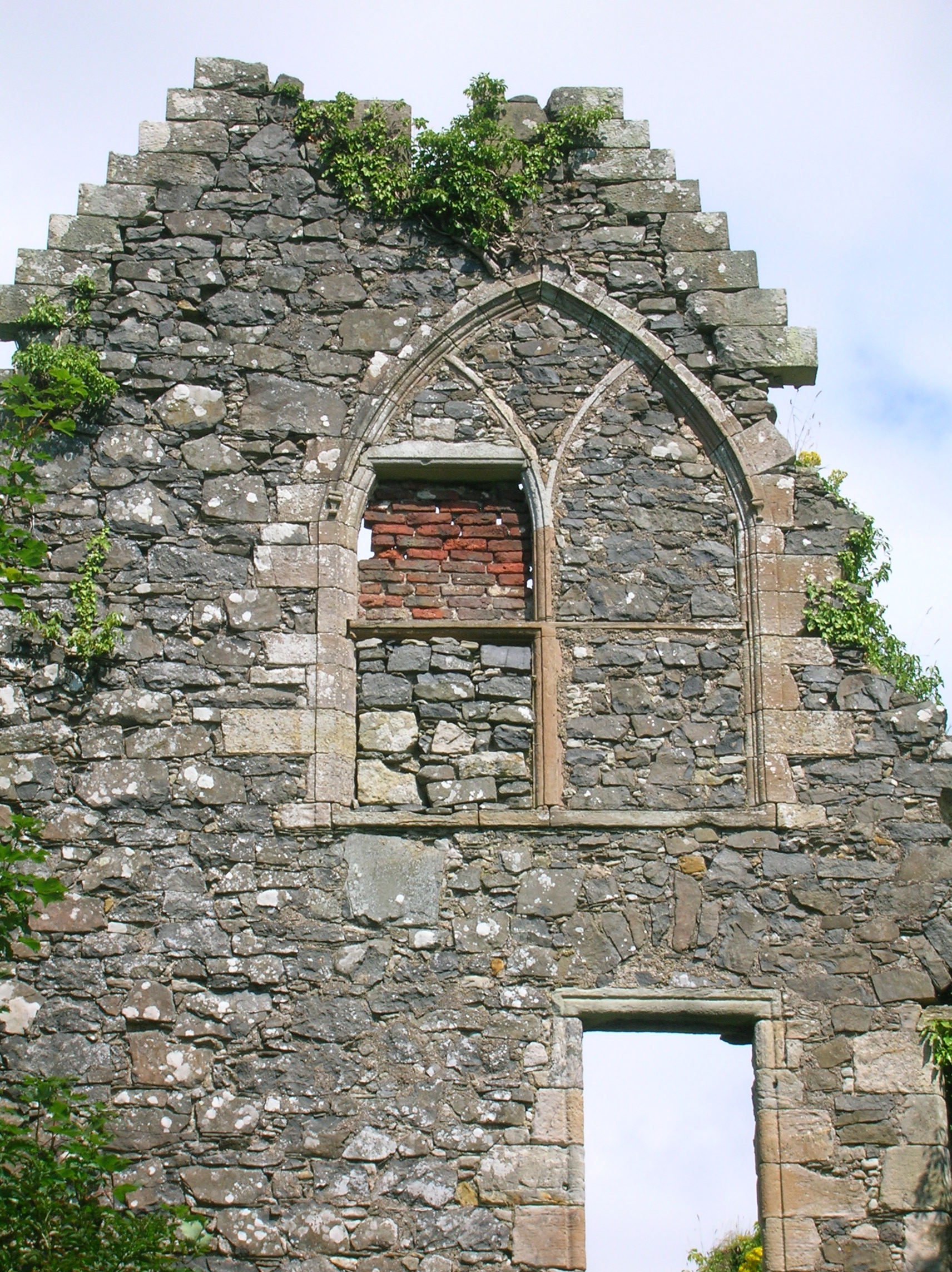
Traceried window in the East gable end

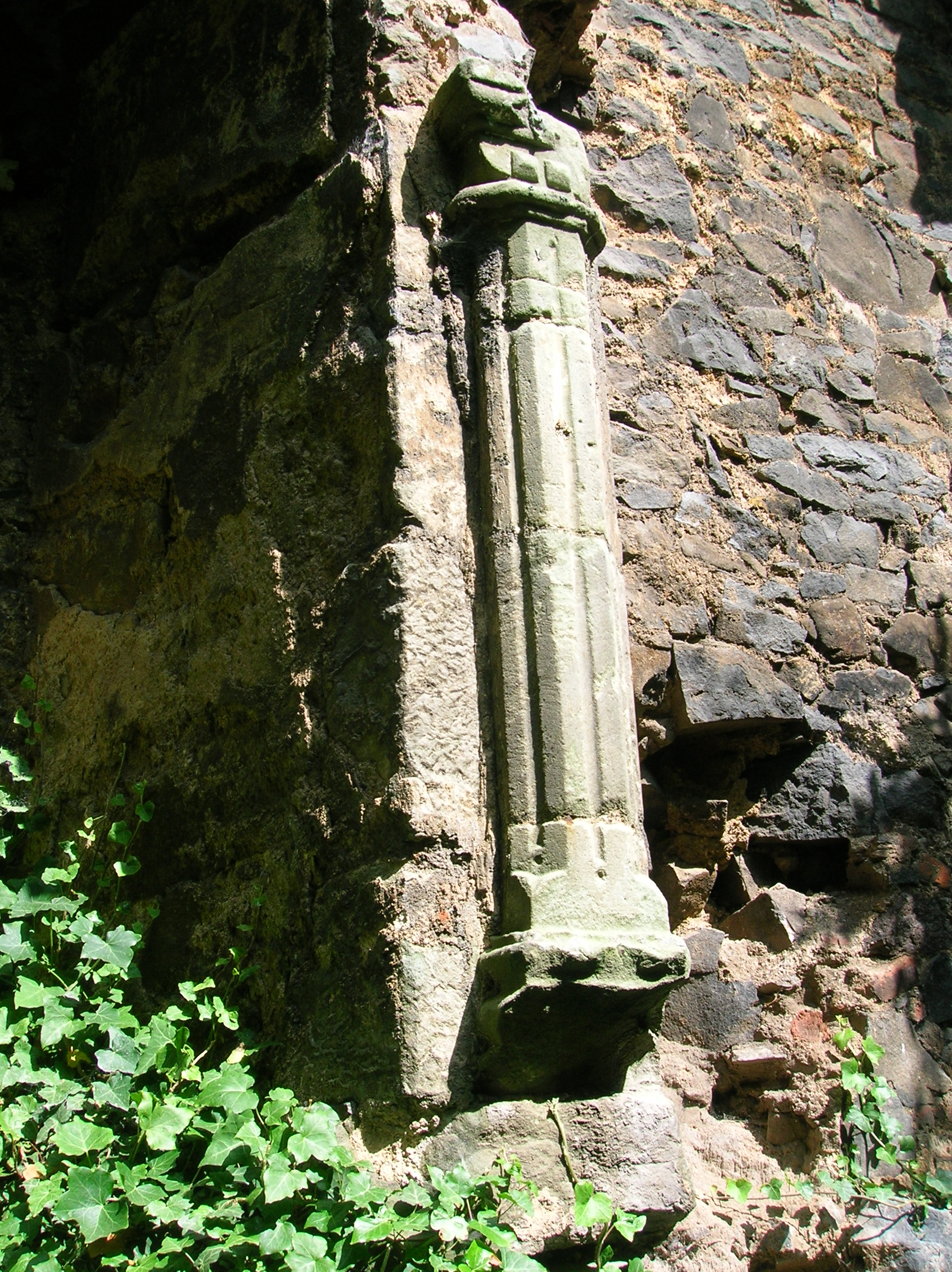
Details of old fireplace

== Meeting with Samuel Johnson and James Boswell ==
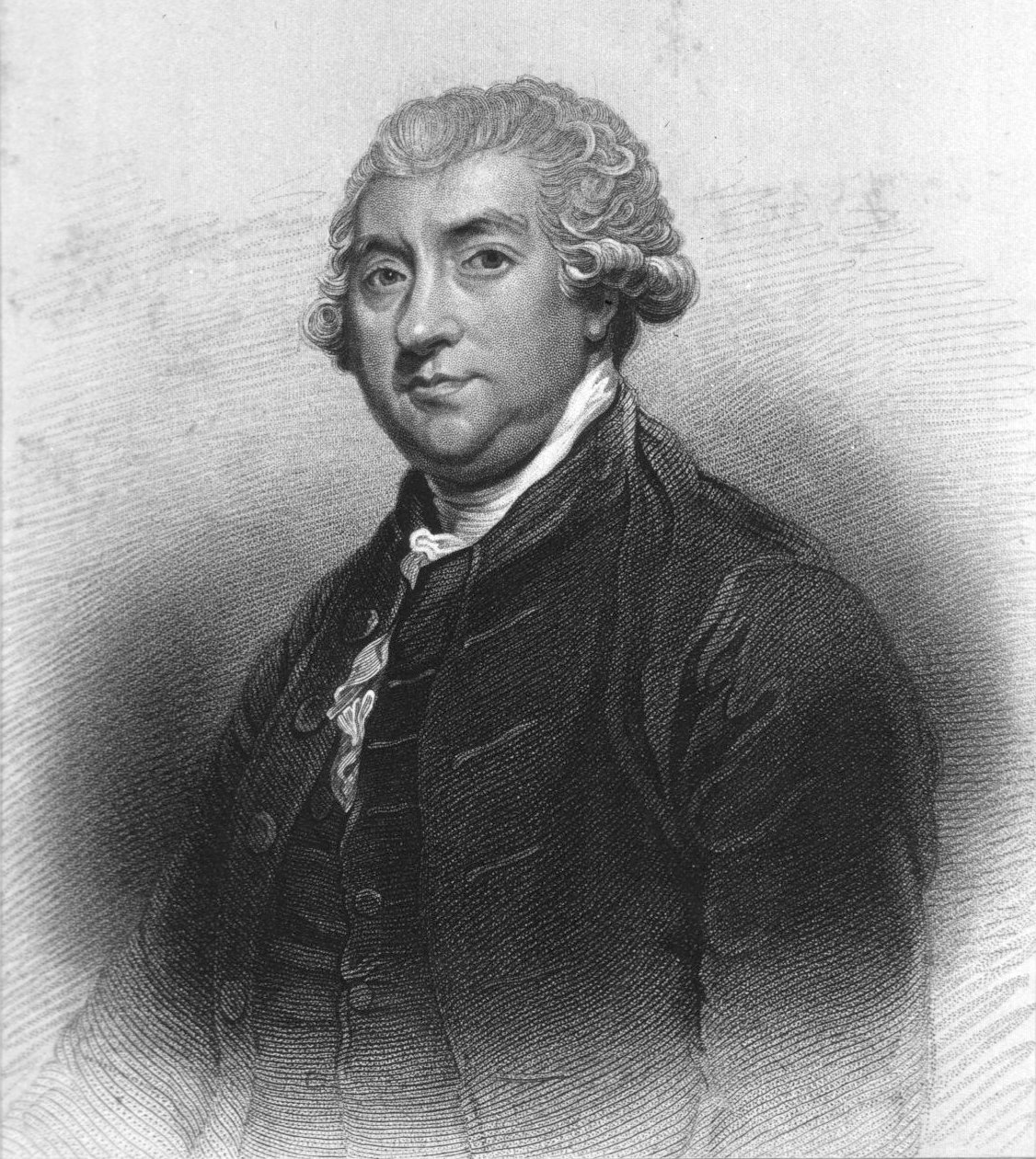
James Boswell of Auchinleck.

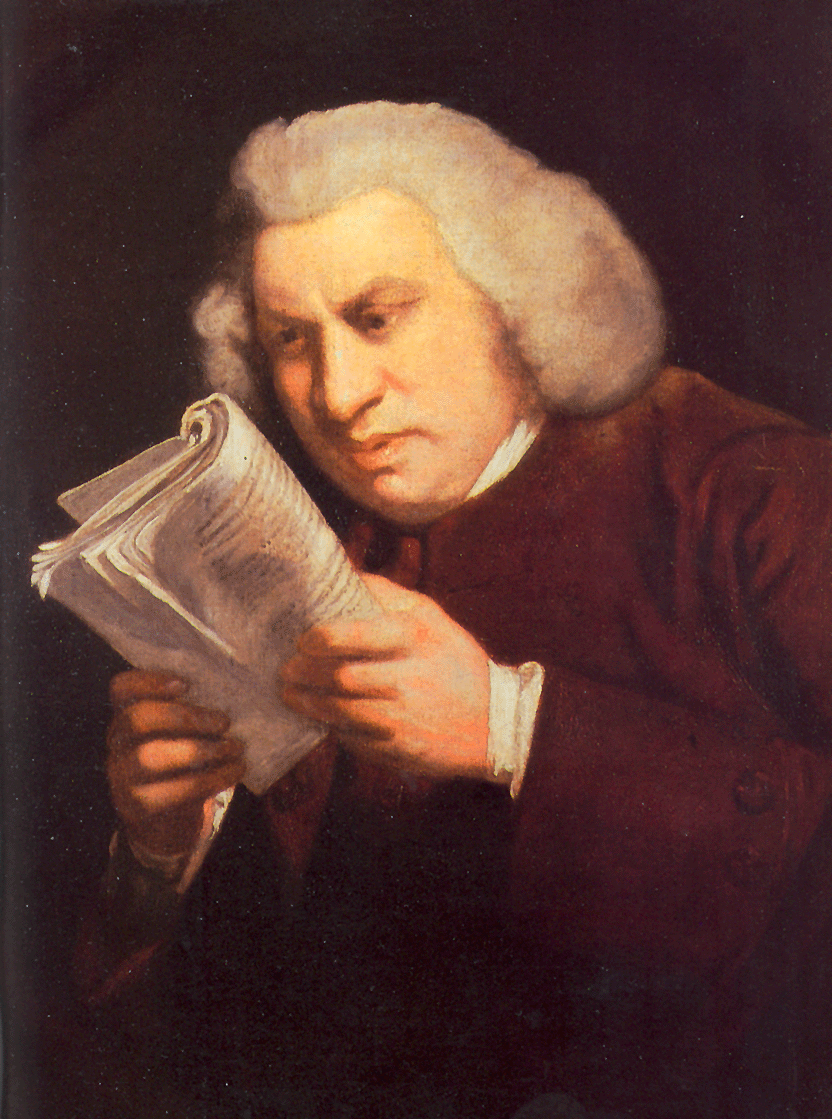
Samuel Johnson by Joshua Reynolds.

In 1773 James Boswell and Samuel Johnson visited Lady Susanna, now the Dowager Countess, at her home, Auchans, near Dundonald. Her son Alexander already knew Johnson and had passed on much information about him to his mother. She knew that Johnson wished to live a long life and became sulky if death was mentioned. She tactfully embraced Johnson upon his departure and commented that as she was old enough to be his mother, she would adopt him as her son; Johnson was delighted. Auchans is now Old Auchans and stands as a substantial ruin in 2009.

Lady Susanna is also remembered for taming a number of rats at Auchans to come for food at her table when she tapped on the oak wall panel and opened a small door. These ten or twelve rats would leave when instructed to; she commented that she valued the gratitude they showed, something she had rarely received from humans.

Johnson, in a letter to Mrs Thrale, described Susanna as a lady who for many years gave the laws of elegance to Scotland. She is in full vigour of mind, and not much impaired in form. She is only eighty-three. She was remarking that her marriage was in the year eight; and I told her my birth was in the year nine. 'Then,' says she, 'I am just old enough to be your mother, and I will take you for my son.' She called Boswell the boy. 'Yes, Madam.' said I, 'we will send him to school.' 'He is already,' said she, 'in a good school;' and expressed her hope of his improvement. At last night came, and I was sorry to leave her.

Johnson also wrote that Her figure is majestic, her manner high bred, her reading extensive and her conversation elegant. She has been the admiration of the gay circles of life.

== Namesakes ==
A Lady Susanna Montgomerie was the daughter of General Archibald Montgomerie, 11th Earl of Eglinton and Frances Twysden. She died on 16 November 1805, unmarried.

Archibald William Alexander Montgomerie, 17th Earl of Eglinton and Winton named his first child for Susanna; Lady Susanna Montgomerie was born 19 October 1941 and became Lady Susanna Crawfurd, having married Mr David Dundas Crawford.

== Microhistory ==
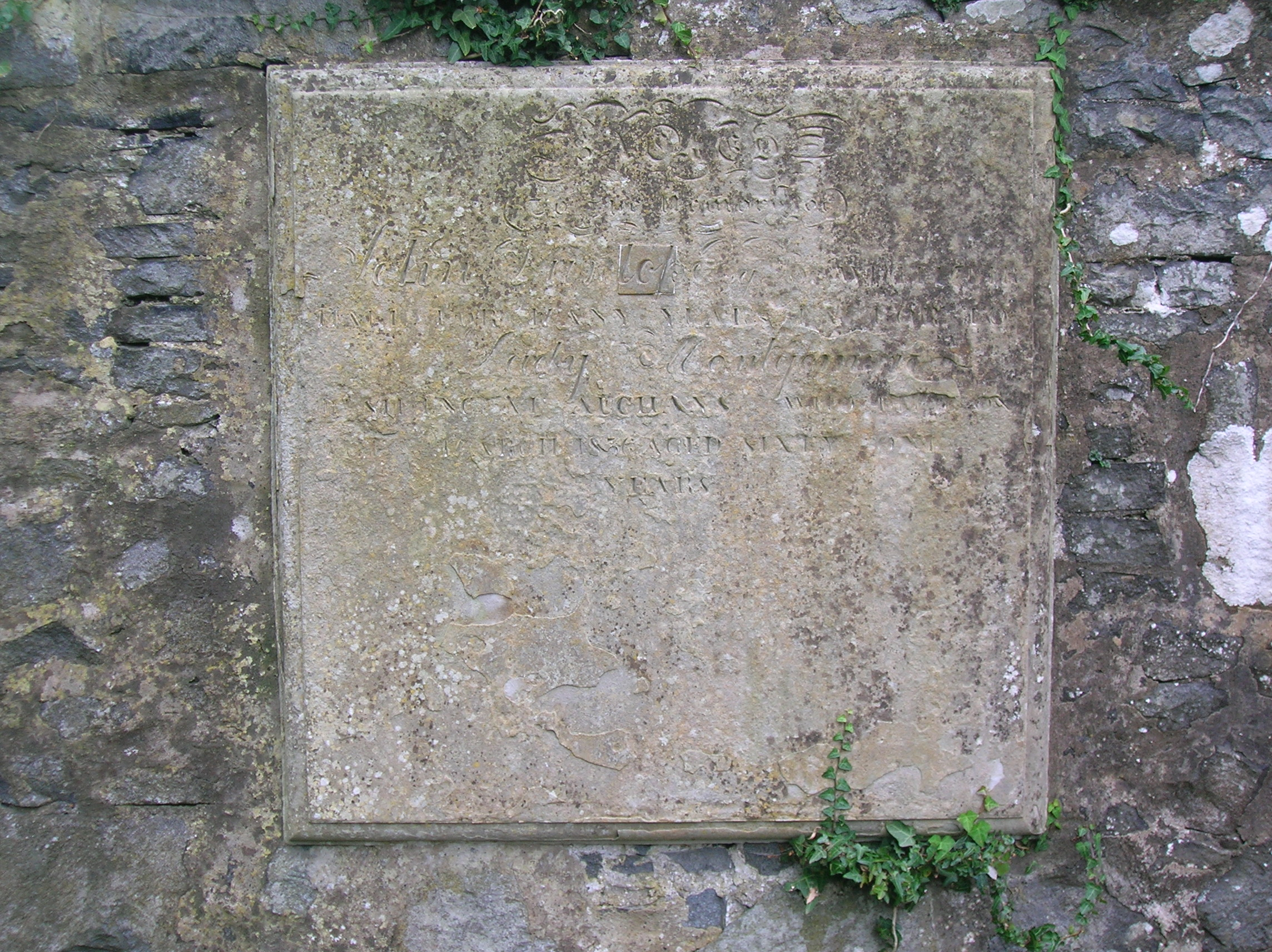
Memorial to John Dunlop.

Around 1708 the elderly Sir John Eldon laid siege to Culzean Castle in a passionate and fruitless act known to locals as Susanna and the Elder.

John Dunlop Esq. of Whitmuir Hall near Selkirk, who lived to sixty one years of age, was the onetime Factor to Susanna Montgomery at Auchans Castle. He may have lived at the now ruined Old Auchans and was held in high regard by William Aiton.

In 1810 a John Crawfurd made a bogus claim to the titles and estates of the Crawfurds and Lindsays; to add some credibility he claimed that his forebear had been the eldest son and heir and had been forced to flee to Ireland after having murdered a man in a duel by firing before the signal. This duel he claimed had been over a matter of honour relating to the Lady Susanna Kennedy, with whom he was entirely smitten.

== See also ==
- Earl of Eglinton
- Eglinton Castle
- Eglinton Country Park
- Auchans Castle, Ayrshire
