= Alexander Montgomerie, 9th Earl of Eglinton =

Scottish peer

The Right Honourable The Earl of Eglinton PC
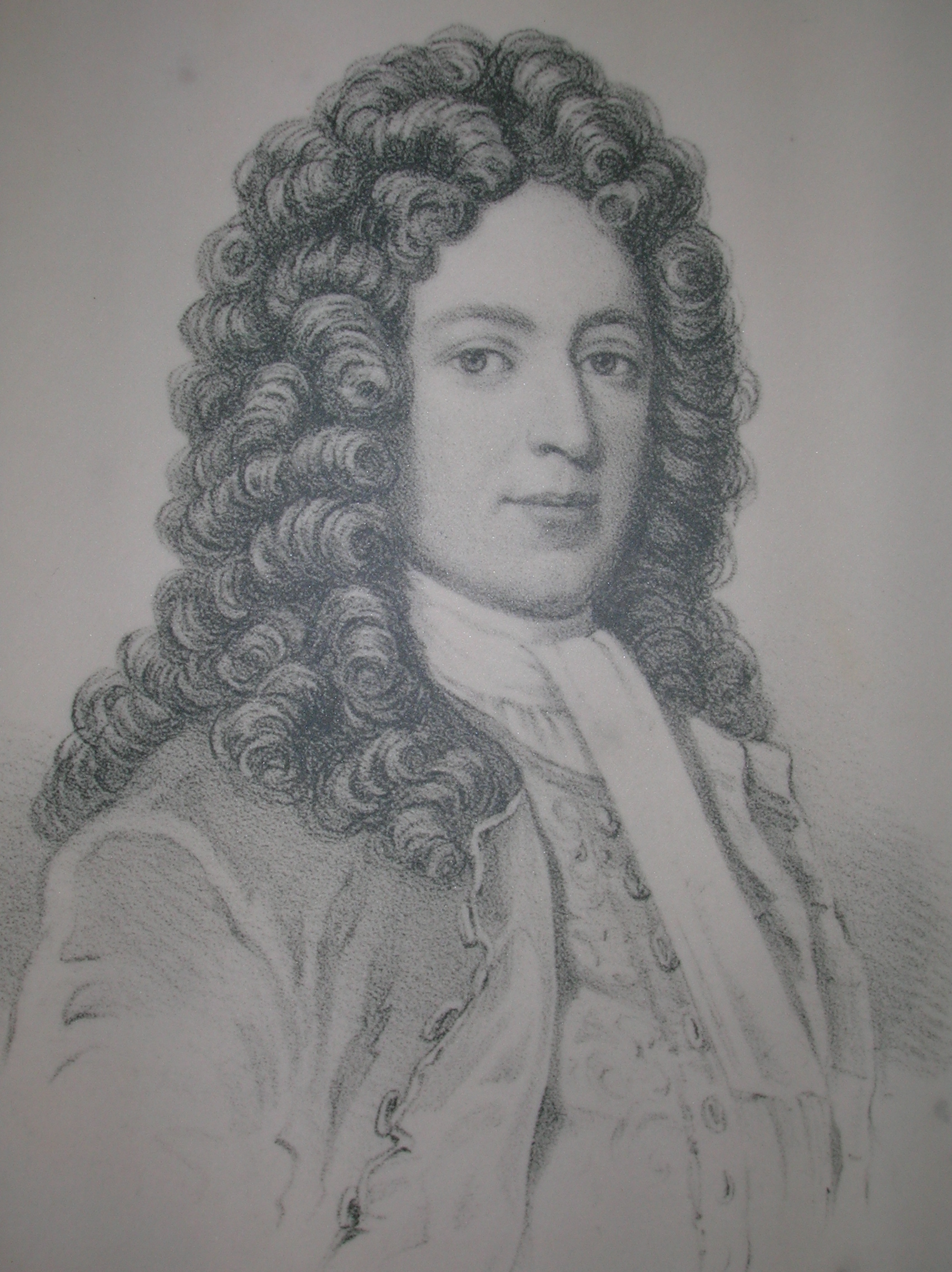

Personal details
- Born: Alexander Seton Montgomerie c. 1660
- Died: 18 February 1729 (aged 68–69) Eglinton Estate, Scotland
- Spouses: Margaret Cochrane; Lady Anne Gordon; Susanna Kennedy (m. 1709)
- Children: 21
- Parents: Alexander, 8th Earl of Eglinton; Lady Elizabeth Crichton

Alexander Seton Montgomerie, 9th Earl of Eglinton (c. 1660 – 18 February 1729) was a Scottish peer, lord of the Eglinton Estate.

== Early life ==
He was born about 1660, the eldest son of Alexander, 8th Earl of Eglinton and Lady Elizabeth Crichton, eldest daughter of William, 2nd Earl of Dumfries.

From the time of the death of his grandfather, Hugh, in 1669 he was boarded with Matthew Fleming, the minister of Culross, Perthshire, who superintended his education at the school of Culross until 1673, when he was sent to the University of St. Andrews, where he remained till Lammas 1676. Montgomerie was a keen freemason.

== Career ==
After the revolution he was chosen a privy counsellor by King William, and also a lord commissioner of the treasury. In 1700, he obtained a letter from the king to sit and vote in the Scots parliament in place of the lord high treasurer.

He succeeded to the earldom on the death of his father in 1701. On Queen Anne's accession in 1702, Eglinton was chosen a privy counsellor, and in 1711 he was named one of the commissioners of the chamberlain's court.

In 1710, and again in 1713, he was elected one of the Scottish representative peers. George Lockhart, who was his son-in-law, stated that when he himself proposed to bring in a bill for resuming the bishops' revenues in Scotland, and applying them to the episcopal clergy there, Eglinton gave his support to the measure, and assured Queen Anne that Presbyterians would not actively oppose it.

This is corroborated by Wodrow, who asserts that Lockhart, either in the House of Peers or in the privy council, proposed 'that as we are one in civil we should be one in church matters'. Wodrow also states that his speech on patronage and toleration was 'so very good' that it was supposed 'it was done by somebody for him'. In June 1712, he also proposed a bill for prolonging the time for taking the oath of abjuration till 1 November.

In the early 18th century is town residence stood at the head of Old Stamp Office Close on the Royal Mile in Edinburgh.

Lockhart affirms that Eglinton at last professed himself a Jacobite, and promised him three thousand guineas 'to help the Pretender in his restoration'. Wodrow also relates that shortly before the rebellion in 1715 Eglinton was at a meeting of the Jacobites where the rebellion, as to the manner of carrying out, was concerted, and heard all their proposals'. Nevertheless, during the crisis he raised and disciplined the Ayrshire fencibles, with which, on 22 August, he joined the Earls of Kilmarnock and Glasgow and Lord Semple at Irvine in support of the government.

== Personal life ==
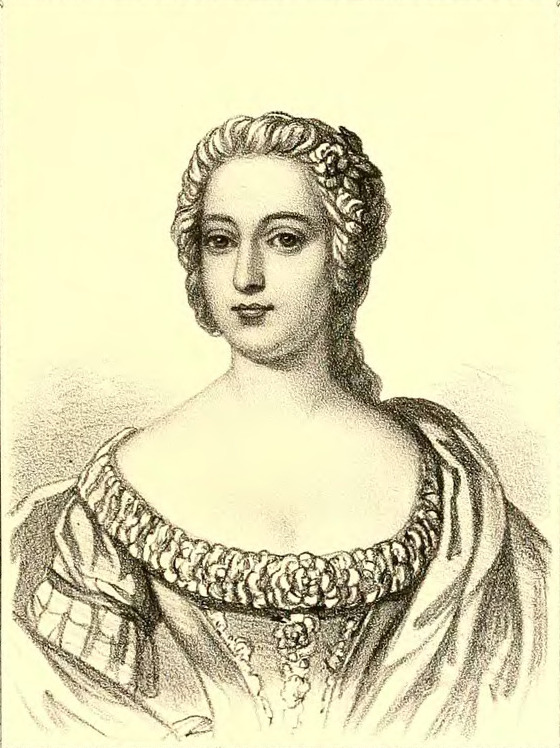
Lady Margaret Cochrane, first wife of the 9th Earl.

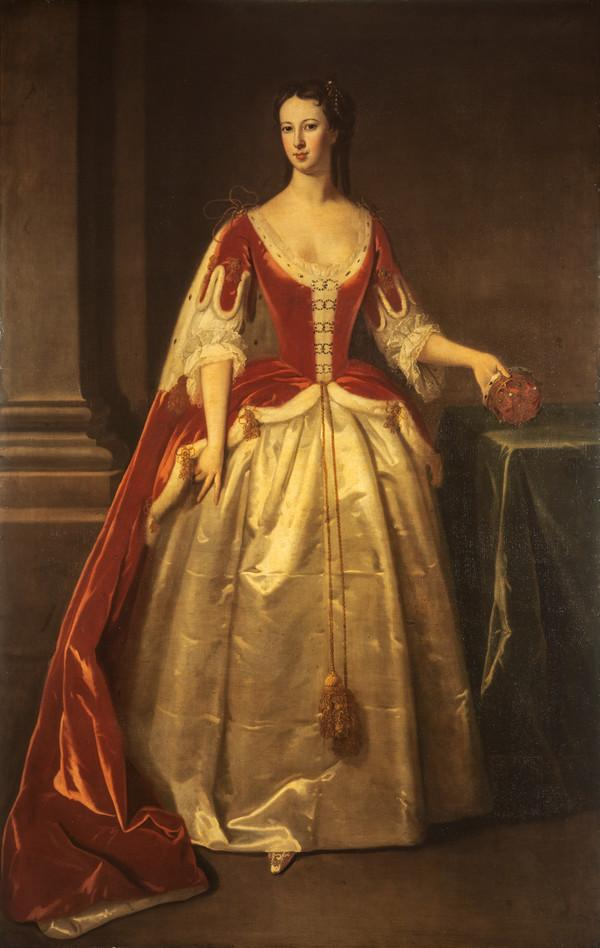
Susanna Montgomery, third wife of the 9th Earl, by William Aikman.

Eglinton was married three times. A few months after leaving the university he married Lady Margaret Cochrane, eldest daughter of William Cochrane, Lord Cochrane, the son of the William Cochrane, 1st Earl of Dundonald, on which occasion his father made over to him the Eglinton estates. By his first wife, he had three sons and six daughters, including:

- Hugh Montgomerie, styled Lord Montgomerie, who died in 1696.
- Alexander Montgomerie, who died young.
- John Montgomerie, who died young.
- Lady Catherine Montgomerie, who married James Stewart, 5th Earl of Galloway.
- Elizabeth Montgomerie, who died young.
- Jean Montgomerie, who died young.
- Lady Euphemia Montgomerie, who married George Lockhart of Carnwath.
- Lady Grace Montgomerie, who married Robert Dalzell, 5th Earl of Carnwath.
- Lady Jean Montgomerie, who married Sir Alexander Maxwell of Monreith, Wigtownshire.

By his second wife, Lady Anne Gordon, daughter of George Gordon, 1st Earl of Aberdeen, he had one daughter:

- Lady Mary Montgomerie, who married Sir David Cuningham of Milncraig, Ayrshire a celebrated beauty, whose charms are sung by Hamilton of Bangour.

By his third wife, Susanna Kennedy of Culzean, daughter of Sir Archibald Kennedy, 1st Baronet of Culzean, Ayrshire, he had three sons and eight daughters:

- James Montgomerie, styled Lord Montgomerie, who died young.
- Alexander Montgomerie, 10th Earl of Eglinton.
- Archibald Montgomerie, 11th Earl of Eglinton.
- Lady Elizabeth Montgomerie, who married John Cunningham of Capringham, Baronet.
- Lady Helen Montgomerie, who married the Hon. Francis Stuart of Pittendriech, third son of James Stuart, 8th Earl of Moray.
- Lady Susanna Montgomerie, who married John Renton of Lamberton.
- Lady Margaret Montgomerie, who married Sir Alexander MacDonald, 7th Baronet.
- Lady Frances Montgomerie, who died unmarried.
- Lady Christian Montgomerie, who married James Moray of Abercairney.
- Lady Grace Montgomerie, who married Charles Byrne, a cornet in Eland's dragoons.
- Charlotte Montgomerie, who died young.

He died suddenly at Eglinton on 18 February 1729. Between nine hundred and a thousand beggars are stated to have attended his funeral, £50 being divided among them. He was succeeded by his son, Alexander.

== See also ==
- Clan Montgomery
- Barony and Castle of Giffen
- Susanna Montgomery, Countess of Eglinton
- Eglinton Castle

Peerage of Scotland
Preceded by Alexander Montgomerie	Earl of Eglinton; 1701–1729	Succeeded by Alexander Montgomerie
