= Maxwell baronets of Monreith (1681) =

The Maxwell baronetcy of Monreith was created in the Baronetage of Nova Scotia on 8 January 1681 for William Maxwell of Monreith House in Mochrum, Wigtownshire.

The 2nd baronet sat as the MP for Wigtown Burghs in 1713–1715. The 5th baronet sat as MP for Wigtownshire in 1805–1812 and 1822–1830. The 7th baronet sat for the same constituency from 1880 to 1906, going on to become Lord Lieutenant of Wigtown.

== Maxwell baronets, of Monreith (1681) ==
- Sir William Maxwell, 1st Baronet (c. 1635–1709)
- Sir Alexander Maxwell, 2nd Baronet (died 1730), son of the 1st Bart.
- Sir William Maxwell, 3rd Baronet (c. 1715–1771), son of the 2nd Bart.
- Sir William Maxwell, 4th Baronet (died 1812), son of the 3rd Bart.
- Sir William Maxwell, 5th Baronet (1779–1838), son of the 4th Bart.
- Sir William Maxwell, 6th Baronet (1804–1877), son of the 5th Bart.
- Sir Herbert Eustace Maxwell, 7th Baronet (1845–1937), son of the 6th Bart.

- Lt-Col Aymer Edward Maxwell (1877–1914), who married Mary, daughter of Henry Percy, 7th Duke of Northumberland

- Sir Aymer Maxwell, 8th Baronet (1911–1987), grandson of the 7th Bart.
- Sir Michael Eustace George Maxwell, 9th Baronet (1943–2021), nephew of the 8th Bart. (son of Eustace Maxwell)
- Sir John Hamilton Maxwell, 10th Baronet (born 1945), descended from the 4th Baronet.
