= Whauphill =

Coordinates: 54.800°N 4.4833°W

- Location within Dumfries and Galloway
- Council area: Dumfries and Galloway
- Lieutenancy area: Wigtown
- Country: Scotland
- Sovereign state: United Kingdom
- Post town: NEWTON STEWART
- Postcode district: DG8
- Dialling code: 01988
- Police: Scotland
- Fire: Scottish
- Ambulance: Scottish
- UK Parliament: Dumfries & Galloway
- Scottish Parliament: Galloway and Upper Nithsdale

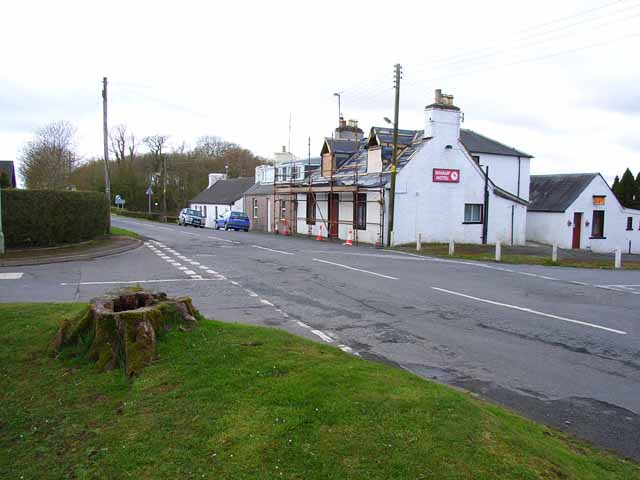
A local pub in Whauphill

Whauphill is a small village located in the historical county of Wigtownshire in the Machars, Dumfries and Galloway, Scotland.

Whauphill is a hub that supports the local industry, predominantly farming and agriculture. There are two tractor shops: Davidson Tractors, a family run Massey Ferguson Dealership, and a branch of Gordon's Agricultural Engineers. There is a branch of Tarff, a country shop, and feed merchant. There is also a post office, and a village hall.

Whauphill used to have a railway station, village shop, hotel and pub, The station closed for passenger traffic in 1950, and the line was closed in 1964 as part of the Beeching cuts, and the village shop quickly followed suit. The hotel was closed when the publican died of cancer. Recent drink driving laws and increase in alcohol taxation have caused revenues in the pub to fall to the point where it is no longer viable and it has closed. Council cuts were going to cause the Village Hall to close but in an end to long-term decline in Whauphill, a community group has now taken control of the village hall from the council and are using it successfully to run local community events.

- Patrick Alexander Vans Agnew (1822–1848). Vans Agnew was the second son of Lieutenant-Colonel Patrick Vans Agnew of Barnbarroch House. A Madras officer of considerable reputation, and afterwards a director of the East India Company.
- Robert Vans Agnew (1817 –1893) was a Scottish Conservative Party politician

Vans Agnew was elected as the member of parliament (MP) for Wigtownshire at a by-election in 1873.

Barnbarroch House, the ancestral seat of the Vans Agnew family, was a Classical house built in 1780, with later additions and remodelling by John Claudius Loudon in 1806. The House is now a shell having been burnt in 1942, killing Mrs Vans Agnew.
