= MacTaggart-Stewart baronets =

Extinct baronetcy in the Baronetage of the United Kingdom

The MacTaggart-Stewart baronetcy, of Southwick in the Stewartry of Kirkcudbright, and Blairderry in the County of Wigtown, was a title in the Baronetage of the United Kingdom. It was created on 7 October 1892 for Mark John Stewart, who represented Wigtown Burghs from 1874 to 1880, and Kirkcudbrightshire from 1885, in the House of Commons. He added the surname MacTaggart in 1896 to 1906 (with some months in 1910).

The title became extinct on the death of the 2nd Baronet, his fourth son, in 1948.

== MacTaggart-Stewart baronets, of Southwick and Blairderry (1892) ==
- Sir Mark John MacTaggart-Stewart, 1st Baronet (1834–1923)
- Sir Edward Orde MacTaggart-Stewart, 2nd Baronet (1883–1948)

Coat of arms of MacTaggart-Stewart of Southwick and Blairderry
Crest A demi-lion rampant, in his dexter paw a round buckle Or. Escutcheon Quarterly, 1st and 4th: Or, a fesse chequy Argent and Azure, surmounted of a bend engrailed Gules charged with three fish hauriant of the Field, in sinister chief point a round buckle of the Fourth, all within a double tressure flory counter-flory of the last (Stewart); 2nd and 3rd: Argent, a bend sable between two owls Proper (MacTaggart). Motto Suffibulatus majores sequor (I follow as my ancestors with my buckler)

Baronetage of the United Kingdom
Preceded by Lea baronets	MacTaggart-Stewart baronets of Southwick and Blairderry; 7 October 1892	Succeeded by Jaffray baronets
