= John Cochrane, 4th Earl of Dundonald =

Scottish aristocrat and politician

The Right Honourable The Earl of Dundonald

Representative Peer for Scotland
- In office 8 October 1713 – 5 January 1715

Personal details
- Born: John Cochrane; 4 July 1687
- Died: 5 June 1720 (aged 32)
- Spouse(s): Lady Anne Murray (m. 1706; died 1710) Mary Somerset, Duchess of Beaufort (m. 1715)
- Children: 4
- Parent(s): John Cochrane, 2nd Earl of Dundonald; Lady Susan Hamilton

John Cochrane, 4th Earl of Dundonald (4 July 1687 – 5 June 1720), was a Scottish aristocrat and politician.

== Early life ==
Cochrane was born on 4 July 1687. He was the second son of John Cochrane, 2nd Earl of Dundonald and Lady Susan Hamilton. His elder brother was William Cochrane, 3rd Earl of Dundonald, who did not marry.

His paternal grandparents were William Cochrane, Lord Cochrane (eldest son and heir apparent of William Cochrane, 1st Earl of Dundonald) and the former Lady Katherine Kennedy (a daughter of John Kennedy, 6th Earl of Cassilis). His maternal grandparents were William Hamilton, Duke of Hamilton and Anne Hamilton, suo jure Duchess of Hamilton.

He entered the University of Glasgow at age 14.

== Career ==
He voted in the election of Scottish representatives on 17 June 1707, but his votes were set aside as he was a minor.

Lord Dundonald served as a Tory Representative Peer for Scotland from 1713 to 1714. He was a Colonel of the 4th Horse Guards from 1715 to 1719.

== Personal life ==
On 4 April 1706, Lord Dundonald was married to Lady Anne Murray (1687–1710) at Cramond. Lady Anne was the second daughter of Charles Murray, 1st Earl of Dunmore and the former Catharine Watts (daughter and heiress of Richard Watts, of Great Munden). Before her death on 30 November 1710 from smallpox, they were the parents of:

- Lady Anne Cochrane (c. 1706–1724), who married, as his first wife, James Hamilton, 5th Duke of Hamilton, in 1723.
- William Cochrane, 5th Earl of Dundonald (1708–1725), who died unmarried.
- Lady Susan Cochrane (d. 1754), who married Charles Lyon, 6th Earl of Strathmore and Kinghorne, in 1725. After his death, she married George Forbes, Master of the Horse, to Prince Charles Edward Stuart, in 1745.
- Lady Catherine Cochrane (d. 1786), who married, as his second wife, her cousin Alexander Stewart, 6th Earl of Galloway, in 1729.

After the death of his first wife, he married Mary Somerset, Duchess of Beaufort (1688–c. 1721) on 15 October 1715. Mary, the widow of Henry Somerset, 2nd Duke of Beaufort, was the youngest daughter of Peregrine Osborne, 2nd Duke of Leeds and the former Bridget Hyde (only daughter and heiress of Sir Thomas Hyde, 2nd Baronet, of Aldbury).

Lord Dundonald died on 5 June 1720 before reaching age 33. He was succeeded in his titles by his only son, William. His widow died in Scotland in c. 1721.

Peerage of Scotland
Preceded by William Cochrane	Earl of Dundonald; 1705–1720	Succeeded by William Cochrane
