= Manasseh Masseh Lopes =

British Member of Parliament and borough-monger

Sir Manasseh Masseh Lopes Bt
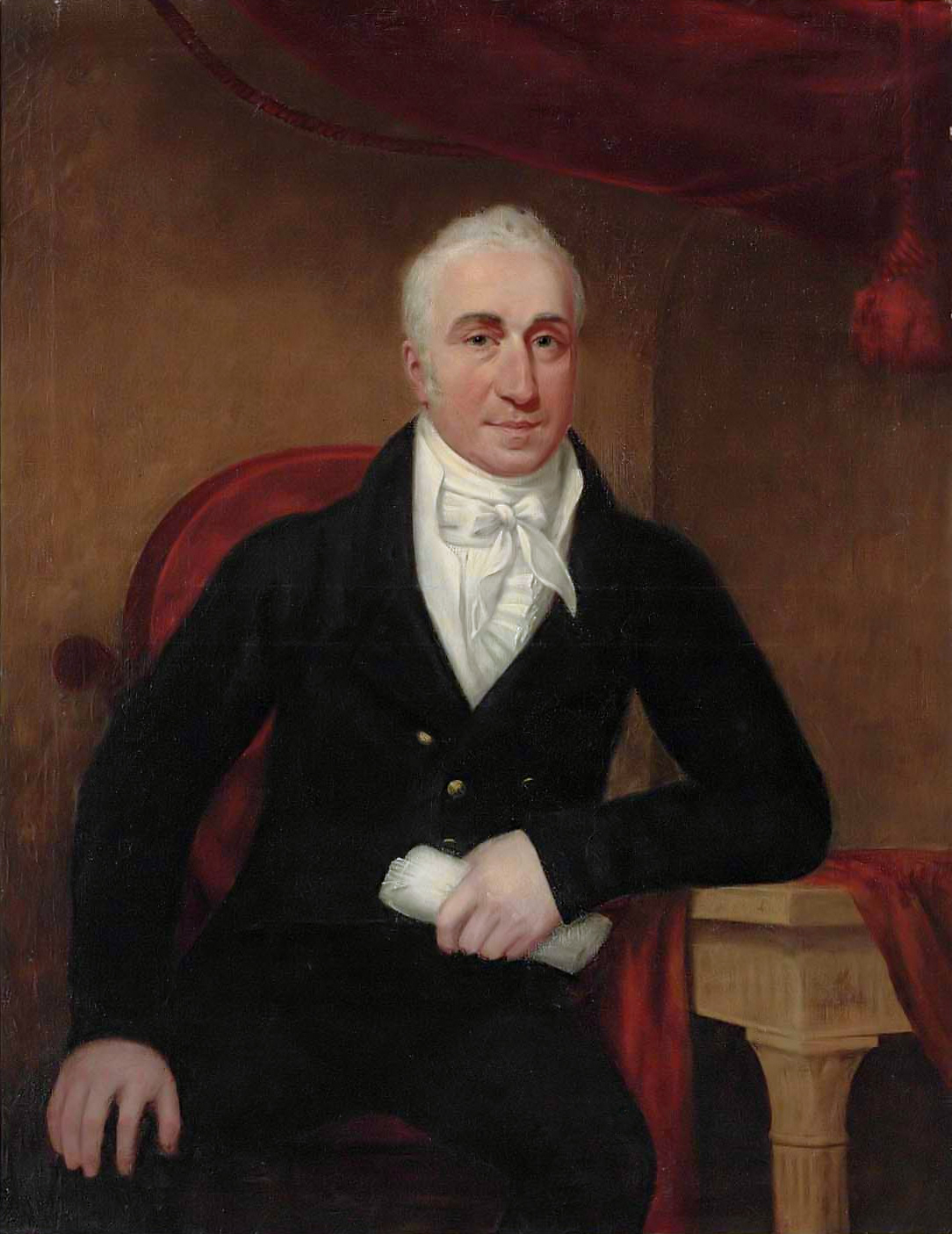
- Portrait of Lopes, c. 1825

Member of Parliament for Westbury
- In office 1820–1829 Serving with Philip John Miles, Sir George Warrender
- Preceded by: Jonathan Elford; Nathaniel Barton
- Succeeded by: Sir George Warrender; Robert Peel

Member of Parliament for Barnstaple
- In office 1812–1819 Serving with Sir Eyre Coote, Francis Molyneux Ommanney
- Preceded by: William Taylor; William Busk
- Succeeded by: Michael Nolan; Francis Molyneux Ommanney

Member of Parliament for Evesham
- In office 1807–1808 Serving with William Manning
- Preceded by: William Manning; Humphrey Howorth
- Succeeded by: William Manning; Humphrey Howorth

Member of Parliament for New Romney
- In office 1802–1806 Serving with John Willett Willett
- Preceded by: John Willett Willett; John Fordyce
- Succeeded by: William Windham; John Perring

Personal details
- Born: 27 January 1755 Jamaica
- Died: 26 March 1831 (aged 76)
- Spouse: Charlotte Yeates (after 1795)

Sir Manasseh Masseh Lopes, 1st Baronet (27 January 1755 – 26 March 1831), of Maristow in the parish of Tamerton Foliot, Devon, was a British Member of Parliament and borough-monger.

His name was simply Manasseh Lopes until October 1805, when he was created a baronet and obtained a licence under the royal sign-manual to add the name of "Masseh" before Lopes.

== Early life ==
Lopes was born a British subject in Jamaica on 27 January 1755 into a family of rich Portuguese Sephardic Jews, who allegedly made their fortune as sugar planters and slave-owners in Jamaica before he migrated to Great Britain. His parents were Mordecai Rodriguez Lopes and Rebecca Pereira (a daughter of Manasseh Pereira of Jamaica).

In 1798 he acquired Maristow House near Roborough in Devon, as a new family seat, from the estate of James Modyford Heywood. He also had a town house in Fitzroy Square, Westminster. He had also for many years been investing part of his fortune in acquiring influence in a number of parliamentary boroughs.

== Parliamentary career ==
By the law as it stood at that period, no member of the Jewish religion could be elected to Parliament. (Many Christian denominations were similarly prohibited.) On 30 June 1802, at St Pancras Church, Lopes was baptized into the Church of England and later the same year he entered Parliament as Tory member for New Romney. He subsequently also represented Evesham from 1807 and Barnstaple from 1812. In 1810, he bought control of the pocket borough of Westbury from Montagu Bertie, 5th Earl of Abingdon when the latter sold the manor of Westbury. Westbury was a burgage borough where the right to vote was attached to the ownership of certain properties; Lopes had bought all but two of these "burgage tenements", giving him the absolute power to name both of Westbury's MPs. (Unlike bribery, transactions of this sort were perfectly lawful.) Between 1814 and 1819, Lopes gave one of those seats to his nephew and heir, Ralph Franco.

Meanwhile, Lopes was exerting his influence in various boroughs on behalf of the government, and in 1805 he was created a baronet, with a special remainder to his nephew Ralph Franco, son of his sister Esther. In 1810, Lopes was appointed High Sheriff of Devon. Franco inherited the baronetcy on his uncle's death and changed his surname to Lopes.

In 1819, Lopes was discovered to have bribed the voters in two separate constituencies at the previous year's general election. Such corruption was common, but reformers were looking for a cause celebre to give prominence to their campaign, and it seems likely that, as a foreign Jew, Lopes was seen as an ideal villain for the purpose. In his own Barnstaple constituency, he was alleged to have spent £3000 on bribing the voters, and after investigation his election was declared void. Meanwhile, at Grampound in Cornwall, although no official protest had been entered against the election result, proceedings had been taken under the criminal law and Lopes was convicted, fined £1000, and jailed for two years. As a result of the scandal, the already notoriously corrupt borough of Grampound was permanently deprived of its right to return members to parliament. Lopes's sentence was remitted in September 1820, and he put himself into Parliament at Westbury in a by-election in November.

In 1829, the Duke of Wellington's Tory government decided to legislate for Catholic emancipation, a policy which was heretical to their own Ultra-Tory supporters. The Home Secretary, Robert Peel, whose own Oxford University constituency was one of the greatest strongholds of opponents of Catholic emancipation, felt compelled to resign and fight a by-election to receive a mandate for his change of policy, and was defeated. To allow Peel to return to the Commons in time to move the bill, Lopes vacated his own seat at Westbury and elected Peel in his place. This provoked considerable hostile comment, not least because the government had responded to the Church of England establishment voting against it by acquiring a seat from a Jewish-born borough owner. Lopes reportedly expected to be rewarded with a peerage for providing Peel with a seat at so vital a moment, but he was disappointed.

Although Peel had no need of the seat after the general election which came the following year, Lopes did not stand again.

== Personal life ==
On 19 October 1795, Lopes married Charlotte Yeates, a daughter of John Yeates, with whom he had two daughters.

Sir Manasseh died in 1831 aged 76. There is a memorial to him by Richard Westmacott in Bickleigh Church.

== Arms ==
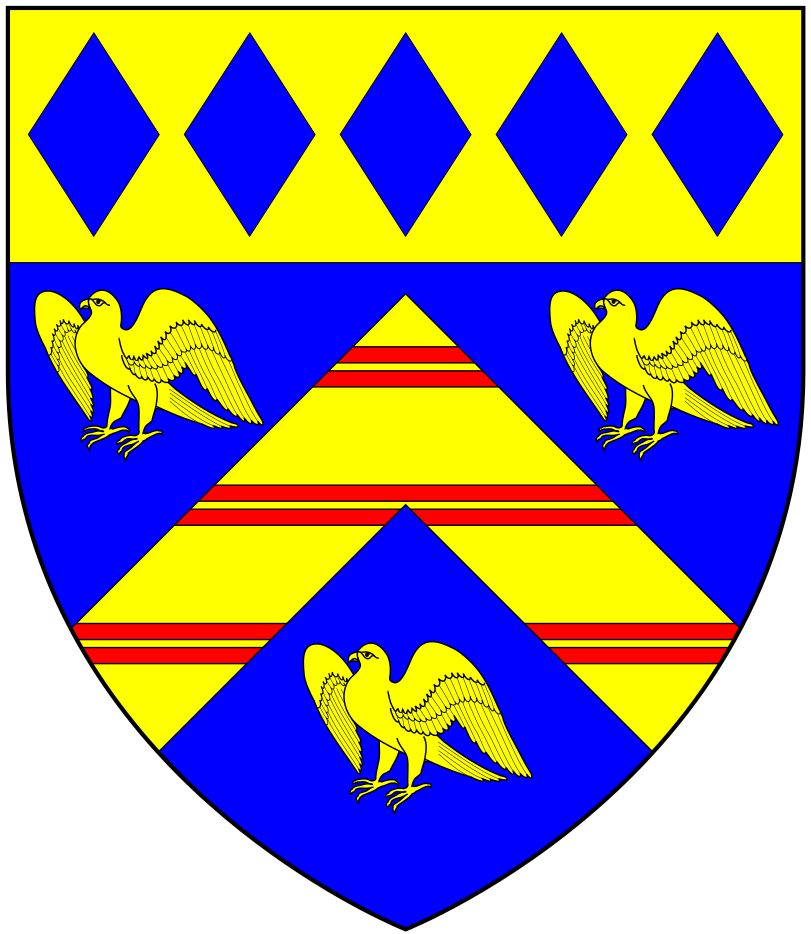
Arms of Lopes

Lopes was granted a coat of arms blazoned Azure, a chevron or charged with three bars gemelles gules between three eagles rising of the second on a chief of the second five lozenges of the first.

== Notes ==
Parliament of the United Kingdom
Preceded by John Willett Willett; John Fordyce	Member of Parliament for New Romney; 1802–1806; With: John Willett Willett	Succeeded by William Windham; John Perring
Preceded by William Manning; Humphrey Howorth	Member of Parliament for Evesham; 1807–1808; With: William Manning	Succeeded by William Manning; Humphrey Howorth
Preceded by William Taylor; William Busk	Member of Parliament for Barnstaple; 1812–1819; With: Sir Eyre Coote 1812–1818; Francis Molyneux Ommanney 1818–1819	Succeeded by Michael Nolan; Francis Molyneux Ommanney
Preceded by Jonathan Elford; Nathaniel Barton	Member of Parliament for Westbury; 1820–1829; With: Philip John Miles 1820–1826; Sir George Warrender 1826–1829	Succeeded by Sir George Warrender; Robert Peel
Baronetage of the United Kingdom
New creation	Baronet (of Maristow); 1805–1831	Succeeded by Ralph Lopes
