= James Stewart (British Army general) =

British Army general

James Stewart (c. 1699 – 27 April 1768) was a Scottish soldier and politician.

He was the second son of James Stewart, 5th Earl of Galloway and his wife Lady Catherine Montgomerie, daughter of Alexander Montgomerie, 9th Earl of Eglinton.

He was educated at Eton, and served as an officer in the Scots Guards for over 30 years, becoming a lieutenant-general in 1758.

He was a member of parliament (MP) in the Parliament of Great Britain for 27 years, representing Wigtown Burghs 1734–1741 and 1747–1754 and Wigtownshire 1741–1747 and 1754–1761.

His younger brother William was also an MP for Wigtown Burghs.

== Sources ==
- Edith, Lady Haden-Guest, STEWART, Hon. James (c.1699-1768), of Auchleand, Wigtown. in The History of Parliament: the House of Commons 1754-1790 (1964).
- R. S. Lea, STEWART, Hon. James (c.1699-1768), of Auchleand, Wigtown. in The History of Parliament: the House of Commons 1715-1754 (1970).

Parliament of Great Britain
Preceded by John Dalrymple	Member of Parliament for Wigtown Burghs; 1734–1741	Succeeded by William Stewart
Preceded by William Dalrymple	Member of Parliament for Wigtownshire; 1741–1747	Succeeded by John Stewart
Preceded by William Stewart	Member of Parliament for Wigtown Burghs; 1747–1754	Succeeded by John Hamilton
Preceded by John Stewart	Member of Parliament for Wigtownshire; 1754–1761	Succeeded by John Hamilton
