= Alexander Maxwell (politician) =

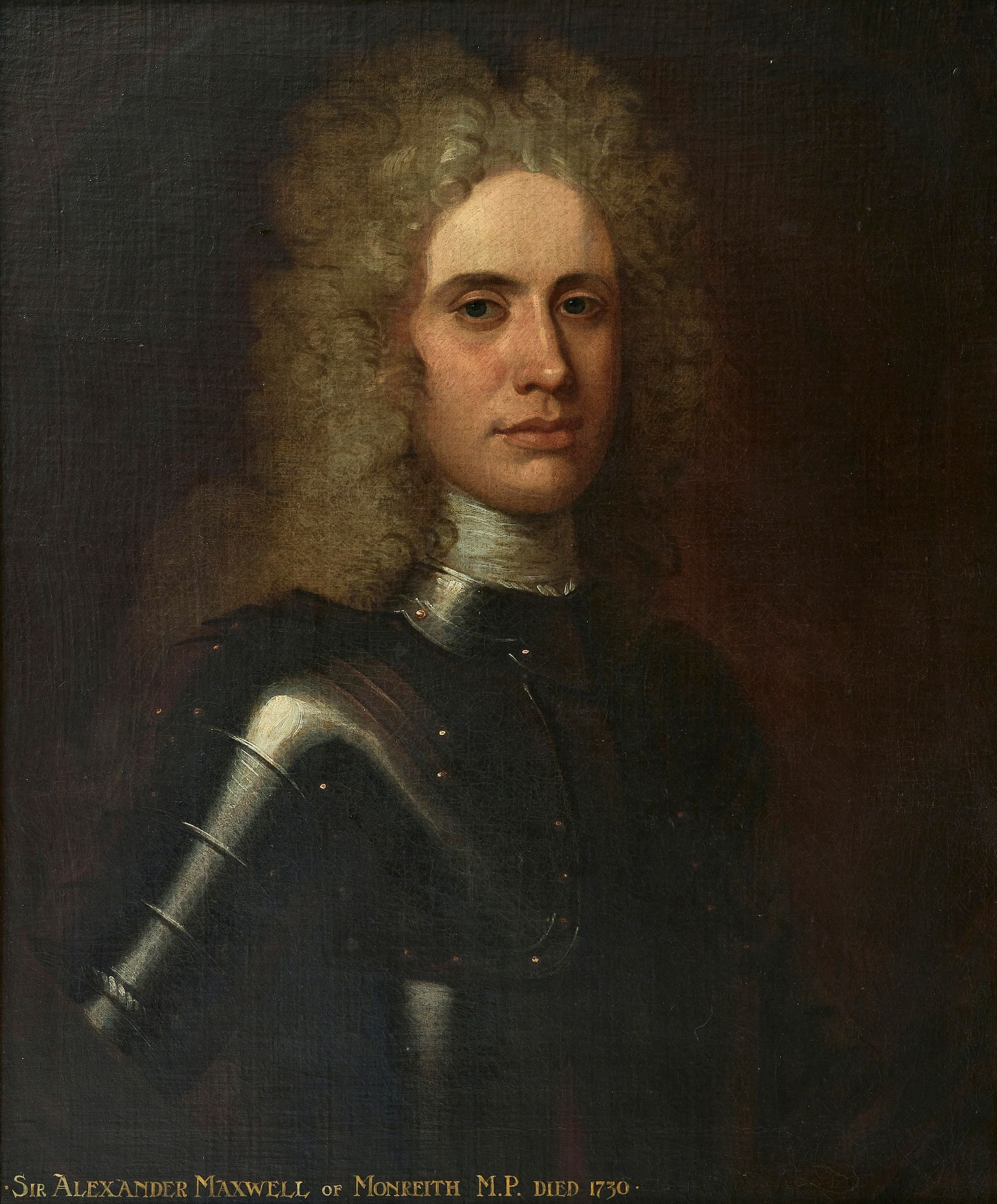
- portrait attributed to William Aikman

Member of the British Parliament for Wigtown Burghs
- In office 1713–1715

2nd Baronet
- In office 1709–1730
- Preceded by: Sir William Maxwell, 1st Baronet
- Succeeded by: Sir William Maxwell, 3rd Baronet

Personal details
- Died: 23 May 1730
- Spouse: Lady Jean Montgomerie
- Children: 7
- Education: University of Glasgow

Sir Alexander Maxwell, 2nd Baronet (died 23 May 1730) of Monreith, Wigtown, was a Scottish Member of Parliament (MP) in the British House of Commons.

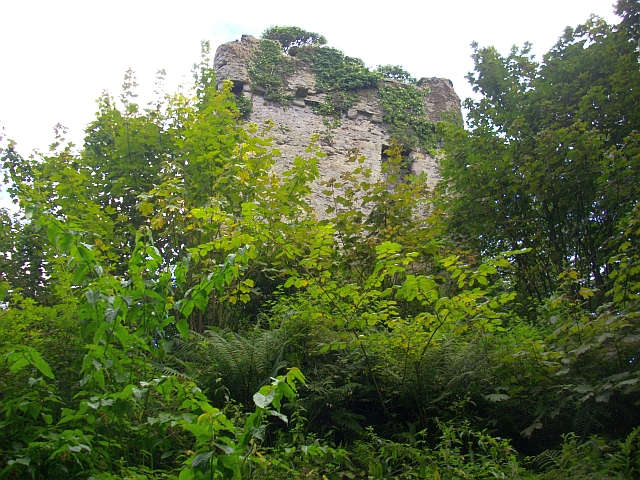
Ruins of the Myrton Castle tower house on the Monreith estate

He was the eldest surviving son of Sir William Maxwell, 1st Bt., of Monreith and educated at the University of Glasgow. He became an advocate in 1705 and succeeded his father as 2nd Baronet and to the Monreith estate in April 1709.

He represented Wigtown Burghs in Parliament in 1713–1715.

He married Jean Montgomerie, daughter of the 9th earl of Eglinton and his first wife Margaret Cochrane and had three sons and four daughters. He was succeeded by his eldest son William, who was the father of Jane, the wife of the 4th Duke of Gordon.

Parliament of Great Britain
| Preceded by William Cochrane | Member of Parliament for Wigtown Burghs; 1713–1715 | Succeeded by Sir Patrick Vanse |
Baronetage of Nova Scotia
| Preceded by William Maxwell | Baronet (of Monreith); 1709–1730 | Succeeded by William Maxwell |
