= Alexander Maxwell =

Alexander Maxwell may refer to:

- Alexander Maxwell (politician) (died 1730)
- Alexander Maxwell (civil servant) (1880-1963)
- Alex Maxwell (footballer) (1886-1961), Scottish footballer, see List of Bury F.C. players (1–24 appearances)
- Alexander Maxwell (bishop)
