= 1869 Wigtown Burghs by-election =

UK Parliamentary by-election

The 1869 Wigtown Burghs by-election was held on 4 January 1869. The by-election was held due to the incumbent Liberal MP, George Young, becoming Solicitor General for Scotland. It was retained by Young who was unopposed.
