= 1915 Wigtownshire by-election =

UK Parliamentary by-election

The 1915 Wigtownshire by-election was held on 12 February 1915. The by-election was held due to the incumbent Conservative MP, John Dalrymple, succeeded as the 12th Earl of Stair. It was won by his uncle, the Conservative candidate Hew Hamilton Dalrymple, who was unopposed.

At the time of the election, John Dalrymple was a prisoner of war in Germany, having been captured by the Germans during the Great Retreat in 1914. He remained a prisoner until 1917 when he was repatriated for medical reasons, due to degradation in his eyesight.
