= Michael Nolan (MP) =

Irish barrister and judge

Michael Nolan (died 1827) was an Irish barrister and judge, known as a politician and legal author.

== Life ==
Born in Ireland, Nolan was admitted an attorney of the Irish Court of Exchequer about 1787, and was called to the English bar at Lincoln's Inn in 1792. He practised as a special pleader on the home circuit and at the Surrey sessions, gained experience of the details of the Poor Laws.

Elected as Member of Parliament for Barnstaple in 1820, Nolan introduced the Poor Law Reform Bills of 1822–3–4. In 1823 he asked for appointment as Puisne Justice of Chester, losing out to Thomas Jervis. He left parliament in March 1824, on being appointed justice of the counties of Brecon, Glamorgan, and Radnor, and died in 1827.

== Works ==
In 1793 Nolan published Reports of Cases relative to the Duty and Office of a Justice of Peace from 1791 to 1793, London. He edited the Reports of Sir John Strange, London, 1795, 2 vols., and was one of the editors of the ‘Supplement’ to Charles Viner's Abridgment, London, 1799–1806, 6 vols.

Nolan's A Treatise of the Laws for the Relief and Settlement of the Poor, (London, 1805, 2 vols.; 4th edit. in 1825, 3 vols.) made his reputation in the legal world. He published also:

- A Syllabus of Lectures intended to be delivered in Pursuance of an Order of the Hon. Soc. of Lincoln's Inn in their Hall, London, 1796; and
- Speech … delivered in the House of Commons, Wednesday, July 10, 1822, on moving for leave to bring in a Bill to alter and amend the Laws for the Relief of the Poor, London, 1822.

== Notes ==
Attribution

This article incorporates text from a publication now in the public domain: Lee, Sidney, ed. (1895). "Nolan, Michael". Dictionary of National Biography. Vol. 41. London: Smith, Elder & Co.

Parliament of the United Kingdom
Preceded by Manasseh Masseh Lopes	Member of Parliament for Barnstaple; 1820–1824; With: Francis Molyneux Ommanney	Succeeded by Frederick Hodgson
