= Edward Ellis (cricketer, born 1810) =

English cricketer

Edward Chauncy Ellis (10 January 1810 – 28 March 1887) was an English cricketer who was associated with the Cambridge University Cricket Club and made his debut in 1829.

Ellis was born in Leyton, Essex. He was a student at Trinity College, Cambridge, from 1828 and won a blue for cricket in 1829; later, he was ordained in the Church of England and after curacies in Essex became the rector of Langham, Essex (in the diocese of St Albans) in 1847 and stayed there until his death in 1887.

He was the youngest brother of Thomas Flower Ellis and the father of Caroline Ellis, the mother of philosopher John McTaggart Ellis McTaggart.

== Bibliography ==
- Haygarth, Arthur (1862). Scores & Biographies, Volume 2 (1827–1840). Lillywhite.
