= Sir John McTaggart, 1st Baronet =

Scottish Whig MP

Sir John McTaggart, 1st Baronet (15 March 1789 – 13 August 1867) was a Scottish Whig MP in the United Kingdom parliament. He was created a baronet in 1841. The title became extinct upon his death.

He represented Wigtown Burghs 1835–1857.

McTaggart was the eldest son of John McTaggart of Ardwell (died 1810), whose estate he inherited. He married, in 1811, Susannah Kymer, eldest daughter of John Kymer, of Streatham, Surrey. They had three children:

- John Bell McTaggart (who died before his father in 1849)
- Susanna McTaggart (ca. 1812 – 25 September 1902), her father's heiress, who married in 1839 John Orde Ommanney (died 1846), son of Sir Francis Molyneux Ommanney. They left an only daughter born Marianne Susanna Ommanney (d. 23 April 1914) who married in 1866 Mark John Stewart , who was created a baronet in 1892 and took the additional surname of MacTaggart in 1905.
- Sarah McTaggart, who married in 1853 James Church, of Calcutta.

His sister, Susan McTaggart, married Thomas Flower Ellis. And their grandson, the philosopher John McTaggart Ellis McTaggart was (twice) named after Sir John McTaggart.

Parliament of the United Kingdom
Preceded by Edward Stewart	Member of Parliament for Wigtown Burghs; 1835–1857	Succeeded by Sir William Dunbar, Bt
Baronetage of the United Kingdom
New creation	Baronet (of Ardwell); 1841–1967	Extinct
