= Edward Stewart (politician) =

British politician (1808–1875)

Edward Stewart (9 October 1808 – 21 March 1875) was a Scottish Whig MP in the British Parliament. He was a nephew of the Earl of Galloway.

He represented Wigtown Burghs in 1831–1835.

Parliament of the United Kingdom
Preceded by John Henry Lowther	Member of Parliament for Wigtown Burghs; 1831–1835	Succeeded by Sir John McTaggart, Bt
