= 1874 Wigtown Burghs by-election =

UK Parliamentary by-election

The 1874 Wigtown Burghs by-election was fought on 12 June 1874. The by-election was fought due to the resignation of the incumbent Liberal MP, George Young, to become a Judge of the Court of Session. It was won by the Conservative candidate Mark John Stewart.
