= John Hamilton (1715–1796) =

Scottish MP

John Hamilton (4 February 1715 – 12 February 1796) was a Scottish MP in the British Parliament.

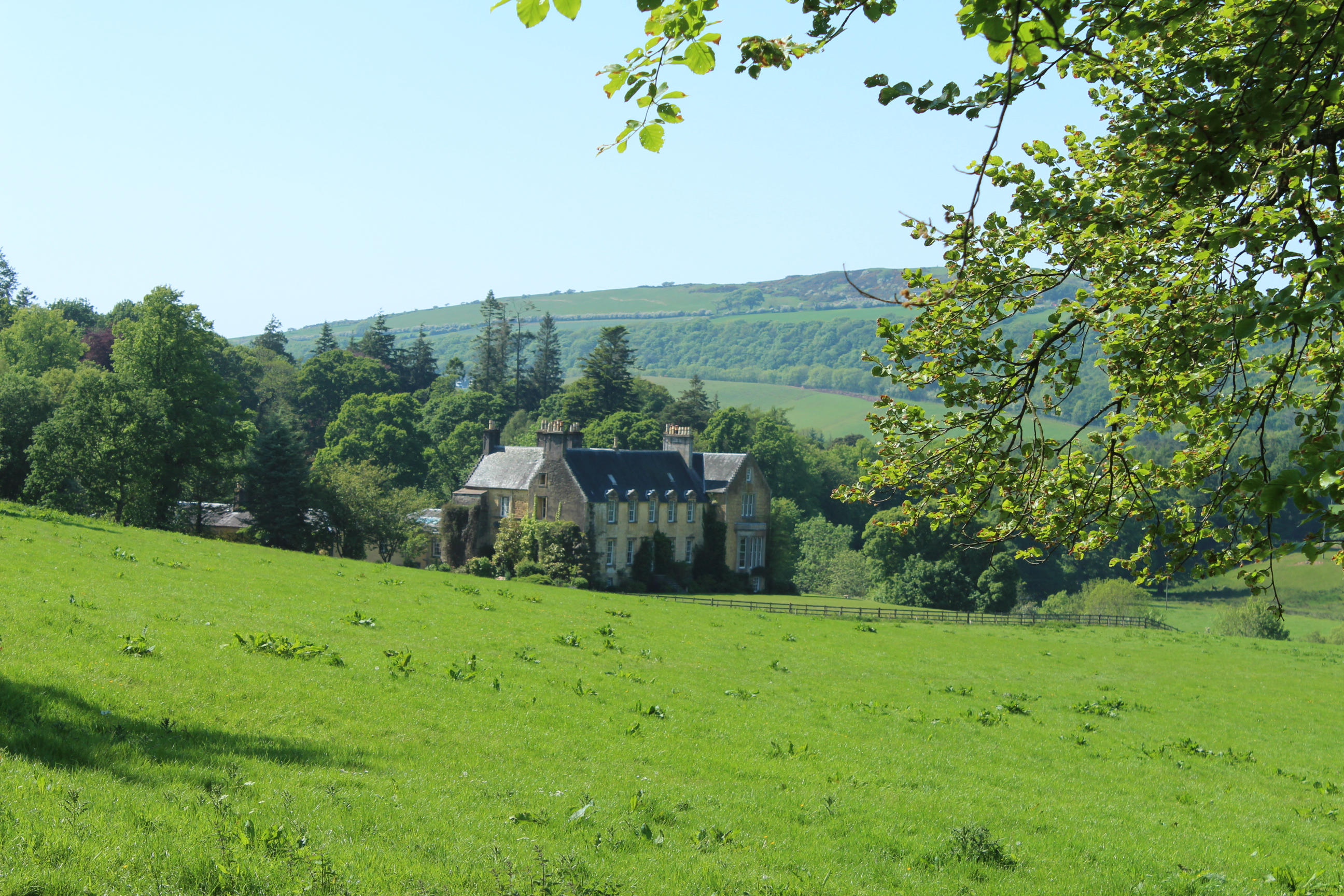
Bargany House, south Ayrshire

He was the second son of Sir Robert Dalrymple of Castleton, Haddington and changed his name to Hamilton in 1736 when he inherited the estate of Bargany in south Ayrshire, by a decision of the House of Peers, on the death of James Hamilton, 4th Lord Bargany.

He represented Wigtown Burghs 1754-1761 and 1762–1768. He was also MP for Wigtownshire 1761-February 1762.

Hamilton was a friend of Frederick, Prince of Wales and supported the Grenvilles in politics. He was an energetic man, who enthusiastically promoted negotiated arrangements in 1754 and 1762 which led to the rival Stewart family supporting him as MP for Wigtown Burghs in exchange for Dalrymple support in the Wigtownshire constituency.

He died childless in 1796 and the Bargany estate passed to his nephew, Sir Hew Dalrymple, 3rd Baronet of North Berwick, who thereupon also assumed the additional surname of Hamilton.

Parliament of Great Britain
Preceded by James Stewart	Member of Parliament for Wigtown Burghs; 1754–1761	Succeeded by Hon. Archibald Montgomerie
Preceded by James Stewart	Member of Parliament for Wigtownshire; 1761–1762	Succeeded by James Murray
Preceded by Keith Stewart	Member of Parliament for Wigtown Burghs; 1762–1768	Succeeded by George Augustus Selwyn
