= Thomas Flower Ellis =

English law reporter (1796–1861)

Thomas Flower Ellis, FRAS FRS (5 December 1796 – 5 April 1861) was an English law reporter.

Ellis was the son of Thomas Flower Ellis, a merchant in the West India trade, and his wife Frances, née Danvers. Born in Walthamstow, he was educated in Hackney and at Trinity College, Cambridge, where he graduated with a BA in 1818, and was elected a fellow in 1819. He graduated with an MA there in 1821, and relinquished his fellowship that same year on his marriage, on 5 September 1821, to Susan McTaggart (1796/97–1839), daughter of John McTaggart of Ardwal.

He became a member of Lincoln's Inn, and was called to the bar in February 1824, and for some years went to the northern circuit. Here he first became acquainted with Thomas Babington Macaulay, and he remained Macaulay's close friend until his death. So attached were they, that when Macaulay went to India, Ellis wrote to him that, "next to his wife, he was the person for whom he felt the most thorough attachment, and in whom he placed the most unlimited confidence". In later life, they visited the continent together every autumn, and he was an executor of Macaulay's will. After his friend died the light seemed to have gone out of Ellis's life, but he occupied himself in preparing for publication the posthumous collection of Macaulay's essays. In 1831 he was a commissioner under the Reform Act 1832 to determine the boundaries of parliamentary boroughs in Wales.

He was, till his death, Attorney-General for the Duchy of Lancaster, and had "Palatine silk"; and in 1839 he succeeded Armstrong as Recorder of Leeds. He was, about 1830, a contributor to the Edinburgh Review, was a member of the Society for the Diffusion of Useful Knowledge, and revised several of its publications. He is best known as co-author of three excellent series of law reports: (with John Leycester Adolphus) Adolphus and Ellis, 1835–1842; (with Colin Blackburn) Ellis and Blackburn, 1853–1858; and (with his son Francis) Ellis and Ellis, published after his death. He was a Fellow of the Royal Astronomical Society, and having been elected in May 1820, was one of that society's earliest members. He was also, from 1847, a Fellow of the Royal Society.

He died at his house, 15 Bedford Place, Russell Square, on 5 April 1861.

His wife Susan nee McTaggart, died on 18 March 1839. They had five sons and two daughters. Their grandson by Francis Ellis, and his wife Caroline Ellis, was the philosopher John McTaggart Ellis McTaggart (who was named after Susan's brother Sir John McTaggart).

His youngest brother (and the father of Caroline Ellis) was Edward Chauncy Ellis.

His cousin was Robert Leslie Ellis.
