= John Dalrymple (died 1742) =

John Dalrymple (c. 1699 – 23 February 1742) was a Scottish member of parliament (MP) in the British Parliament.

He represented Wigtown Burghs 1728–1734.

Parliament of Great Britain
| Preceded by William Dalrymple | Member of Parliament for Wigtown Burghs; 1728–1734 | Succeeded by James Stewart |
