= Mark MacTaggart-Stewart =

British politician

Sir Mark John MacTaggart-Stewart, 1st Baronet (12 October 1834 – 26 September 1923), known as Mark John Stewart until 1880, was a Scottish Conservative Member of Parliament in the House of Commons of the United Kingdom. He represented Wigtown Burghs from 1874 to 1880 and again for a few months later in 1880 and also sat for Kirkcudbrightshire between 1885 and 1906 and briefly in 1910.

He married in 1866 Marianne Susanna Ommanney, daughter and heiress of John Orde Ommanney (d.1846), who was a son of Sir Francis Molyneux Ommanney. Her mother Susanna MacTaggart was a daughter of Sir John McTaggart, 1st Baronet, and through her they inherited an estate at Ardwell. In 1905 he assumed the additional surname of MacTaggart as he and his wife took possession of the Ardwell estate of her grandfather. He was an officer in the 1st Ayrshire and Galloway Artillery Volunteers and was appointed their Honorary Colonel on 22 December 1888.

On 7 October 1892, he was made a Baronet, of Southwick in the Stewartry of Kirkcudbright and Blairderry in the County of Wigtown. MacTaggart-Stewart died in September 1923, aged 88. He was succeeded in the Baronetcy by his only surviving son, Sir Edward Orde MacTaggart-Stewart, 2nd Baronet.

Sir Mark and Lady MacTaggart-Stewart had five daughters and one son:

- Janet Gertrude MacTaggart-Stewart (b.1871), married in 1899 Robert George Seton (b.1860), a descendant of the Barons Brownlow, and left children.
- Sarah Blanche MacTaggart-Stewart (b.1872).
- Frances Emily MacTaggart-Stewart (1873–1949), married in April 1903 Archibald Kennedy, Earl of Cassilis (1872–1943), who succeeded in 1938 as Marquess of Ailsa. They left no children.
- Susanna Mary MacTaggart-Stewart (1878–1961), married first in 1901 Archibald Patrick Thomas Borthwick, 20th Lord Borthwick (1867–1910), and secondly in 1916 Alfred FitzRoy, 8th Duke of Grafton, leaving daughters by both husbands.
- Margaret Anna MacTaggart-Stewart (1880–1962), married in 1906 (div. 1919) Sir David Charles Herbert Dalrymple, 2nd Baronet (1879–1932), and had children.
- Edward Orde MacTaggart-Stewart (1883–1948), who succeeded as 2nd and last Baronet, leaving two daughters by his wife married in 1917 Hon. Margaret Selina Flora Maud Clifton-Hastings-Campbell (1895–1975), daughter of the 3rd Baron Donington.

== Notes ==
Parliament of the United Kingdom
Preceded by George Young	Member of Parliament for Wigtown Burghs; 1874–1880	Succeeded by John McLaren
Preceded by John McLaren	Member of Parliament for Wigtown Burghs; 1880–1880	Succeeded by Sir John Dalrymple-Hay, Bt
Preceded by John Maxwell Heron-Maxwell	Member of Parliament for Kirkcudbrightshire; 1885–1906	Succeeded by Gilbert McMicking
Preceded by Gilbert McMicking	Member of Parliament for Kirkcudbrightshire; Jan 1910–Dec 1910	Succeeded by Gilbert McMicking
Baronetage of the United Kingdom
New creation	Baronet (of Southwick and Blairderry); 1892–1923	Succeeded by Edward Orde MacTaggart-Stewart
