= Sir William Dunbar, 7th Baronet =

Scottish Liberal Member of Parliament

Sir William Dunbar, 7th Baronet (2 March 1812 – 17 December 1889) was a Scottish Liberal Member of Parliament in the British House of Commons.

== Life ==
He was born on 2 March 1812 the son of James Dunbar and his wife, Anna Catharina van Reed d'Oudtshoorn.

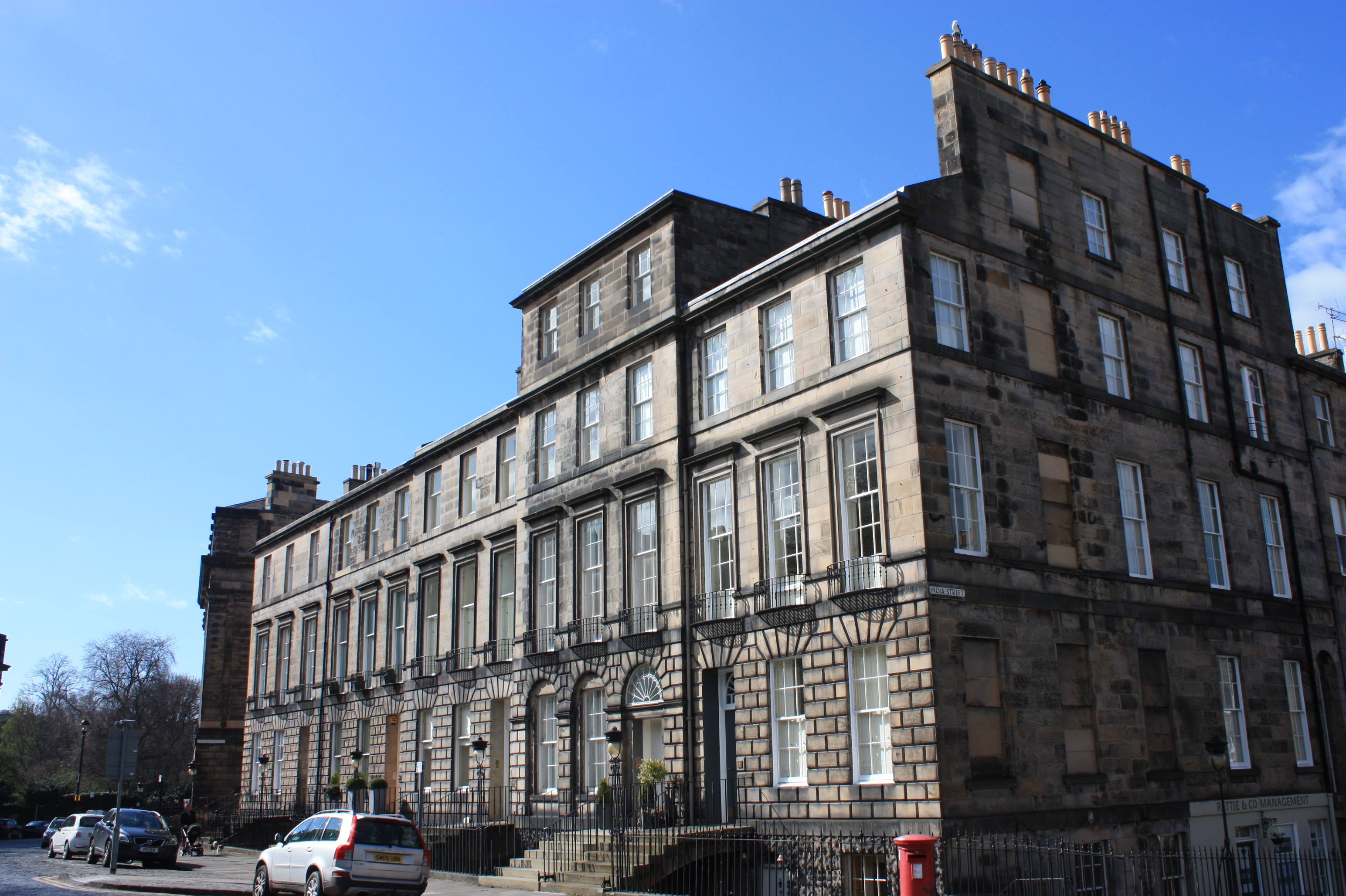
43 to 47 Heriot Row, Edinburgh

He was educated at the University of Edinburgh. He became a member of the Faculty of Advocates in 1835, but did not practise law.

He became the 7th Baronet on 22 June 1841 on the death of his paternal uncle, who died without a male heir.

In 1850 he was living at 47 Heriot Row in central Edinburgh.

He was appointed a Lord of the Treasury in 1859. He became Keeper of the Privy Seal to the Prince of Wales. Dunbar left Parliament in 1865 to become Commissioner for Auditing Public Accounts. He was Comptroller and Auditor General 1867–1888.

He represented Wigtown Burghs 1857–1865.

== Family ==
In 1842 he married Catherine Hay Paterson (d.1890). His eldest son Uthred James Hay Dunbar became 8th baronet and on his death in 1904, being childless, the baronetcy passed to the second son, William Cospatrick Dunbar (1844–1931).

Parliament of the United Kingdom
Preceded by Sir John McTaggart, Bt	Member of Parliament for Wigtown Burghs; 1857–1865	Succeeded by George Young
Political offices
Preceded by Office established	Comptroller and Auditor General; 1867–1888	Succeeded by Charles Ryan
Baronetage of Nova Scotia
Preceded by William Rowe Dunbar	Baronet (of Mochrum); 1841–1889	Succeeded by Uthred Hay Dunbar
