= John Cochrane, 2nd Earl of Dundonald =

Scottish aristocrat

The Right Honourable The Earl of Dundonald

Personal details
- Born: John Cochrane c. 1660
- Died: 16 May 1690 (aged 29–30)
- Spouse: Lady Susan Hamilton (m. 1684)
- Children: Lady Anne Cochrane; William Cochrane, 3rd Earl of Dundonald; John Cochrane, 4th Earl of Dundonald
- Parent(s): William Cochrane, Lord Cochrane (father); Lady Katherine Kennedy (mother)

John Cochrane, 2nd Earl of Dundonald (c. 1660 – 16 May 1690), styled Lord Cochrane from 1679 to 1686, was a Scottish aristocrat.

== Early life ==
He was the eldest son of William Cochrane, Lord Cochrane (d. 1679) and the former Lady Katherine Kennedy. Among his siblings were William Cochrane (who married Lady Grizel Graham, a daughter of James Graham, 2nd Marquess of Montrose), Margaret Cochrane (wife of Alexander Montgomerie, 9th Earl of Eglinton), Helen Cochrane (wife of John Gordon, 16th Earl of Sutherland), and Jean Cochrane (wife of John Graham, 1st Viscount Dundee and William, 3rd Viscount of Kilsyth).

His paternal grandparents were William Cochrane, 1st Earl of Dundonald and Eupheme Scott, a granddaughter of Robert Lindsay, 9th Lord Lindsay. His maternal grandparents were John Kennedy, 6th Earl of Cassilis and Lady Jean Hamilton, a daughter of Thomas Hamilton, 1st Earl of Haddington.

He was educated at the University of Glasgow.

== Career ==
Following the death of his father, he was styled Lord Cochrane. Upon the death of his grandfather in 1685, he inherited the earldom of Dundonald, as his father predeceased his grandfather in 1679. He supported William of Orange, who became King of England, Ireland, and Scotland in 1689.

== Personal life ==
In November 1684, Cochrane married Lady Susan Hamilton, the second daughter of William Hamilton, Duke of Hamilton and Anne Hamilton, suo jure Duchess of Hamilton. Together, they were the parents of:

- Lady Anne Cochrane (b. 1685), who died young.
- William Cochrane, 3rd Earl of Dundonald (1686–1705), who died unmarried.
- John Cochrane, 4th Earl of Dundonald (1687–1720), who married Lady Anne Murray, a daughter of Charles Murray, 1st Earl of Dunmore in 1706. After her death in 1710, he married Lady Mary Somerset, widow of Henry Somerset, 2nd Duke of Beaufort and daughter Peregrine Osborne, 2nd Duke of Leeds in 1715.

Lord Dundonald died on 16 May 1690 and was buried 29 May 1690 in Dundonald Church. He was succeeded in his titles by his eldest son, William. As he died unmarried in 1705, his second son John inherited the earldom. After his death, his widow married Charles Hay, 3rd Marquess of Tweeddale.

Peerage of Scotland
Preceded by William Cochrane	Earl of Dundonald; 1685–1690	Succeeded by William Cochrane
