= John Stewart (Wigtownshire MP, died 1748) =

Scottish soldier and politician

John Stewart (after 1670 – 22 April 1748) of Sorbie, Wigtown was a Scottish soldier and politician who sat in the Scottish Parliament from 1702 to 1707 and in the British House of Commons between 1707 and 1727.

Stewart was born after 1670, the 3rd surviving son of Alexander Stewart, 3rd Earl of Galloway and his wife Lady Mary Douglas, daughter of James Douglas, 2nd Earl of Queensberry He was educated at Glasgow University in 1687 and then joined the army. He was an ensign in the 3rd Foot Guards in 1691, a captain-lieutenant in April 1692, and captain and lieutenant-colonel in July 1692.

In 1702 Stewart was returned in the Scottish parliament for the Scottish constituency of Wigtownshire. After the Act of Union he was one of the Scottish representatives to the first Parliament of Great Britain in 1707 and was returned as Member of Parliament for Wigtownshire at the 1708 general election. During this time he became 2nd lieutenant-colonel in 1704 and in 1710 was 1st lieutenant colonel and colonel of foot. In parliament in 1710, he voted for the impeachment of Sacheverell. The same year he was promoted Brigadier-General and later served in the Peninsula commanding British forces during the War of the Spanish Succession.

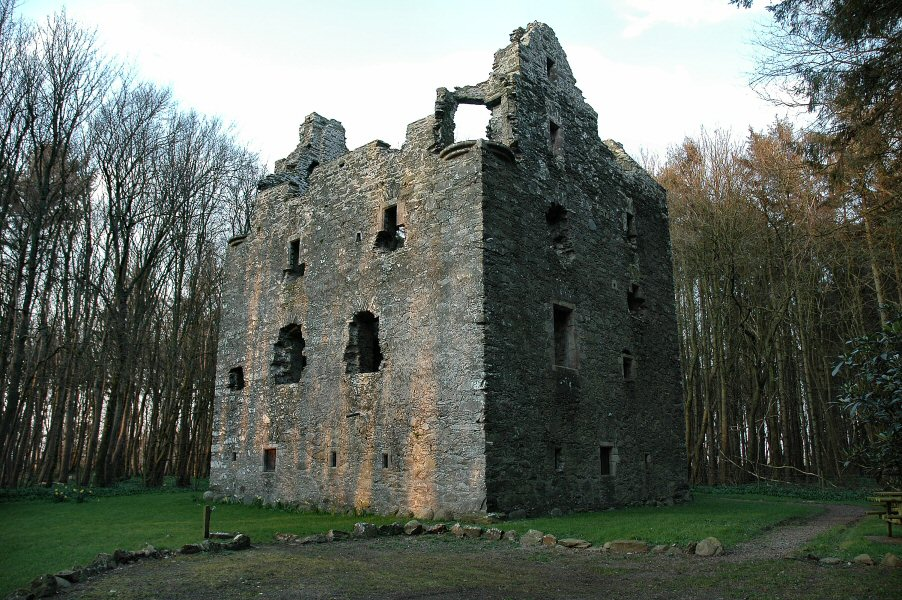
Ruins of Sorbie Tower (the Old Place of Sorbie)

He was initially defeated at the 1710 general election, but petitioned and was reinstated as MP for Wigtownshire on 3 March 1711. He was returned unopposed in the family interest as a Whig in subsequent general elections in 1713, 1715 and 1722. He did not stand at the 1727 general election.

Stewart was the last resident of the Old Place of Sorbie and died, apparently unmarried, at Sorbie in April 1748. He lies buried in the local kirkyard. .

Parliament of Scotland
Preceded by William Steuart the elder of Castlesteuart	Shire Commissioner for Wigtownshire; 1702–1707; With: William Steuart the elder of Castlesteuart	Succeeded by Parliament of Great Britain
Parliament of Great Britain
New parliament	Member of Parliament for Scotland; 1707–1708	Constituency split
New constituency	Member of Parliament for Wigtownshire; 1708–1710	Succeeded by Patrick Vanse
Preceded by Patrick Vanse	Member of Parliament for Wigtownshire; 1711–1727	Succeeded by William Dalrymple
