= Hew Hamilton Dalrymple =

British politician (1857–1945)

The Honourable Sir Hew Dalrymple KCVO

Member of Parliament for Wigtownshire
- In office 12 February 1915 – 1918
- Preceded by: John Dalrymple, 12th Earl of Stair
- Succeeded by: Constituency abolished
- Majority: Unopposed

Personal details
- Born: 27 September 1857
- Died: 11 July 1945 (aged 87) Edinburgh
- Party: Unionist Party (Scotland)

Military service
- Allegiance: United Kingdom
- Branch/service: British Army
- Years of service: 1877-
- Rank: Major
- Unit: Royal Scots Fusiliers

Hon. Sir Hew Hamilton Dalrymple, KCVO (27 September 1857– 11 July 1945) was a Scottish politician and aristocrat. He was a Unionist Party Member of Parliament for Wigtownshire.

== Biography ==
Hew Hamilton Dalrymple was born on 27 September 1857, the third son of John Dalrymple, 10th Earl of Stair and was educated at Harrow School. In 1877, he joined the Royal Scots Fusiliers as a second lieutenant, subsequently rising to the rank of Major. In 1908, he was appointed to the rank of Brigadier in the Royal Company of Archers.

Throughout his life, he had an interest in the arts. In April 1912, he became one of the Trustees of the National Galleries of Scotland, becoming chairman of the Trustees in 1930. He would remain chairman until his resignation from the post in 1944.

He was the unopposed candidate for the seat of Wigtownshire at the by-election in 1915. The seat was previously held by his nephew, John Dalrymple, 12th Earl of Stair. The by-election was caused by John Dalrymple's succession to his Earldom. At the time, John Dalrymple was a prisoner of war in Germany, having been captured in 1914 during the Retreat from Mons.

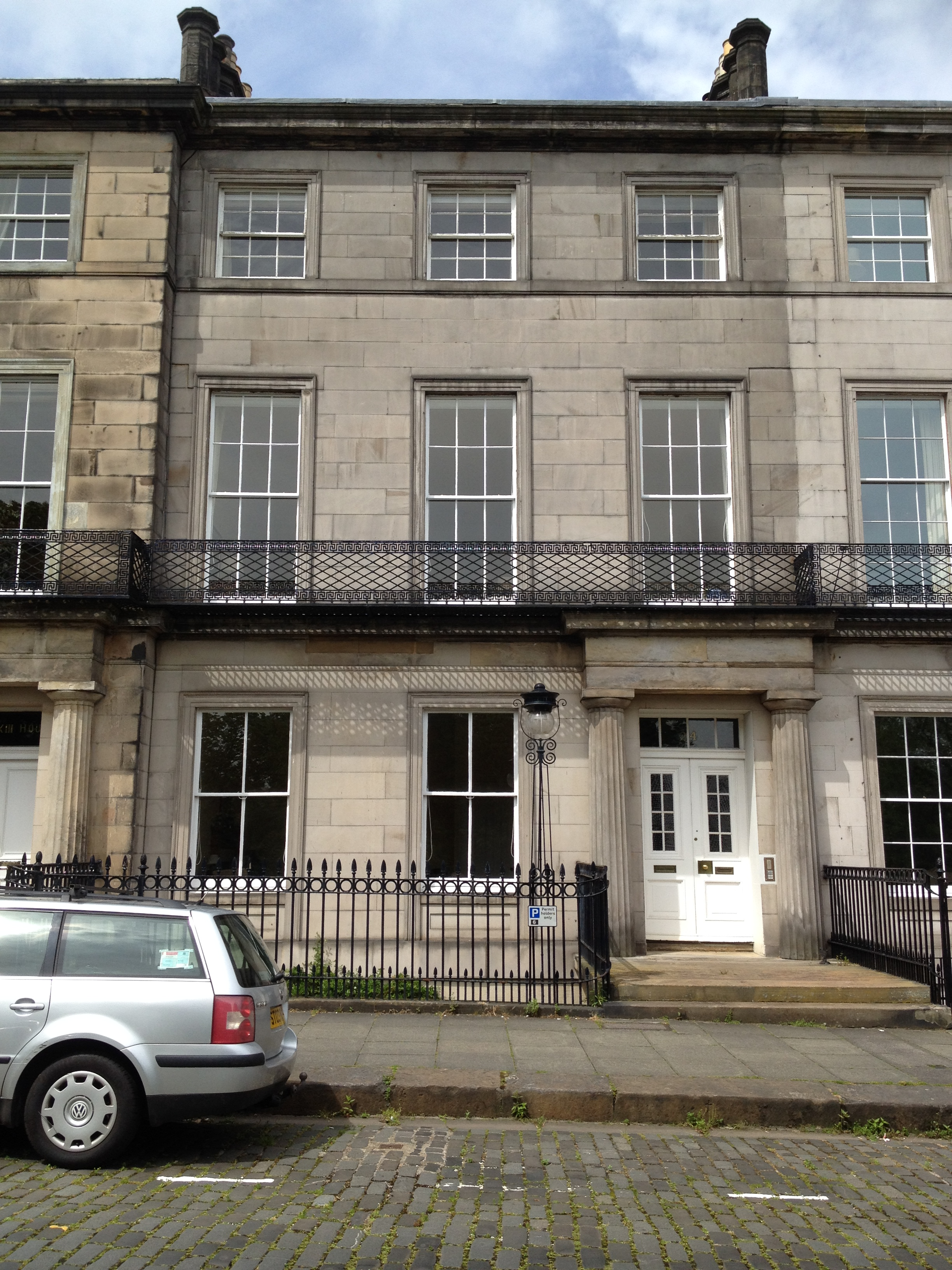
24 Regent Terrace 2015

Later in 1915, Dalrymple became Deputy Lieutenant to Wigtownshire. He remained a Member of Parliament for three years, until his seat was abolished in 1918. He was made a Knight Commander of the Royal Victorian Order in the 1932 New Year Honours and was an honorary member of the Royal Scottish Academy.

Dalrymple lived in Edinburgh for many years, living at 24 Regent Terrace, a Regency house that overlooked Holyrood Palace, was visited by Queen Mary and was a well-known figure in the city. He died in his home on 11 July 1945, unmarried and without issue.

Parliament of the United Kingdom
| Preceded by Viscount Stair | Member of Parliament for Wigtownshire; 1915–1918 | Constituency abolished |
