= William Stewart (politician, died 1748) =

Scottish soldier and politician

William Stewart (c. 1706 – 3 May 1748) was a Scottish soldier and politician

MP in the British Parliament.

He was the third son of James Stewart, 5th Earl of Galloway and his wife Lady Catherine Montgomerie, daughter of Alexander Montgomerie, 9th Earl of Eglinton.

He was educated at Glasgow University, and served as an officer in the British Army, becoming a captain in the 12th Dragoons in 1737.

He sat in the House of Commons of Great Britain from 1741 to 1747 as MP for Wigtown Burghs.

His older brother James Stewart was also an MP for Wigtown Burghs.

Parliament of Great Britain
Preceded by James Stewart	Member of Parliament for Wigtown Burghs; 1741–1747	Succeeded by James Stewart
