= William Cochrane (MP) =

Scottish politician

Member of Parliament for Wigtown Burghs
- In office 1708–1713
- Preceded by: George Lockhart
- Succeeded by: Alexander Maxwell

Personal details
- Born: After 1659
- Died: August 1717
- Relations: William Cochrane, 1st Earl of Dundonald (grandfather); John Cochrane, 2nd Earl of Dundonald (brother)
- Parent(s): William Cochrane, Lord Cochrane; Lady Katherine Kennedy

William Cochrane (after 1659 – August 1717) of Kilmaronock, Dunbarton was a Scottish politician who sat in the Parliament of Scotland between 1689 and 1707 and as a Tory in the House of Commons of Great Britain from 1708 to 1713.

== Early life ==
Cochrane was the second son of William Cochrane, Lord Cochrane and his wife Lady Katherine Kennedy. Among his siblings were John Cochrane, 2nd Earl of Dundonald, Margaret Cochrane (wife of Alexander Montgomerie, 9th Earl of Eglinton), Helen Cochrane (wife of John Gordon, 16th Earl of Sutherland), and Jean Cochrane (wife of John Graham, 1st Viscount Dundee and William, 3rd Viscount of Kilsyth).

His paternal grandparents were William Cochrane, 1st Earl of Dundonald and Euphemia Cochrane, Countess of Dundonald (a granddaughter of Robert Lindsay, 9th Lord Lindsay). His maternal grandparents were John Kennedy, 6th Earl of Cassilis and Lady Jean Hamilton (a daughter of Thomas Hamilton, 1st Earl of Haddington).

== Career ==
In 1679, he succeeded his grandfather, William, Lord Cochrane, to the Kilmaronock estate. He was a lieutenant in Lord Ross's independent troop of horse between 1689 and 1691.

=== Political career ===
Cochrane represented Renfrew in the Convention of Estates in 1689 and as a burgh commissioner in the Parliament of Scotland from 1689 to 1695. He was a commissioner justiciary for the Highlands in 1693. In 1694, he succeeded his brother Thomas to Powkellie, East Ayrshire. He was a shire commissioner for Dumbartonshire in the Parliament of Scotland from 1702 to 1707. After the Union, he was returned as member of parliament for Wigtown Burghs at a by-election on 14 December 1708. At the 1710 British general election he was returned unopposed for Wigtown and was appointed joint Keeper of the Signet in 1711. He did not stand at the 1713 British general election.

== Personal life ==
He married Lady Grizel Graham, daughter of James Graham, 2nd Marquess of Montrose and the Lady Isabel Ker (widow of Robert Ker, 1st Earl of Roxburghe, and fifth daughter of William Douglas, 7th Earl of Morton). Together, they were the parents of:

- Thomas Cochrane, 6th Earl of Dundonald (1702–1737), who married Catherine Hamilton, a daughter of Lord Basil Hamilton of Baldoon (sixth son of William Hamilton, Duke of Hamilton and Anne Hamilton, suo jure Duchess of Hamilton).
- Catherine Cochrane (1691–1772), who married David Smythe of Methven.
- Isabella Cochrane (d. 1770), who married, as his third wife, John Ogilvy of Balbegno.
- Grizel Cochrane (d. 1753), who married her cousin John Cochrane of Ferguslie.

Cochrane died in August 1717, leaving a son and five daughters. He was succeeded by his son Thomas, later the 6th Earl of Dundonald.

Parliament of Scotland
Preceded by	Burgh Commissioner for Renfrew; 1689–1698	Succeeded by Patrick Houston,
Preceded by John Haldane of Gleneagles	Shire Commissioner for Dumbartonshire; 1702–1707; With: Sir Humphrey Colquhoun	Succeeded by Parliament of Great Britain
Parliament of Great Britain
Preceded by George Lockhart	Member of Parliament for Wigtown Burghs; 1708–1713	Succeeded by Alexander Maxwell
