= William Cochrane, 1st Earl of Dundonald =

1st Earl of Dundonald

William Cochrane, 1st Earl of Dundonald (1605– November 1685) supported the Royalist cause during the Wars of the Three Kingdoms.

== Early life ==
Cochrane was the eldest surviving son of Alexander Cochrane (né Blair) and Elizabeth Cochrane (third daughter and co-heiress of William Cochrane of that Ilk).

== Career ==
William Cochrane of Coldoun, who was knighted by Charles I, acquired the estate of Dundonald in 1638. He was created Baron Cochrane of Dundonald in 1647. The part he had taken in the Wars of the Three Kingdoms, is evidenced by the proceedings of the Presbytery of Ayr, which, on 28 February 1649, debarred "Lord Cochrane" from renewing the Solemn League and Covenant, he having "been a Colonel in the late unlawful rebellion, and having went to Ireland to bring over forces," etc.

In 1654 he was fined in £5,000 by Cromwell's Act of Pardon and Grace. In 1669, he was made a Commissioner of the Treasury and Exchequer, and created Baron Cochrane, of Paisley and Ochiltree (having previously acquired the latter barony), and Earl of Dundonald, with remainder to the heirs-male of his body, failing which, to tho eldest heirs-female of his body without division, and the heirs-male of such heirs-female, bearing the name and arms of Cochrane. Cochrane was an active freemason.

In 1684 the Earl was accused, in his old age, of having kept a chaplain with his dying son, who prayed for the success of these rebels in the west—those Covenanters who defeated Claverhouse at the Battle of Drumclog in 1679. The Earl died in 1686, and was interred in the church of Dundonald.

== Personal life ==
Sometime after 14 April 1633, William married Eupheme, a daughter of Sir William Scott of Ardross and Elie, and Hon. Helen Lindsay (sister to John Lindsay, 17th Earl of Crawford, 1st Earl of Lindsay). Together, they were the parents of:

- William Cochrane, Lord Cochrane (d. 1679), who married Lady Katherine Kennedy, a daughter of John Kennedy, 6th Earl of Cassilis, in 1653.
- Hon. Sir John Cochrane of Ochiltree, who married Catherine Strickland, daughter of Sir William Strickland, 1st Baronet, MP, in 1656.
- Hon. James Cochrane (d. c. 1694)
- Lady Grizel Cochrane, who married George Ross, 11th Lord Ross.

Lord Dundonald died in 1686, and was interred in the church of Dundonald. Lady Dundonald died at Dundonald in 1687. The 2nd through 7th Earls were all descendants of her first son, while the 8th Earl was a descendant of her second son, John.

=== Descendants ===
Through his son William, he was a grandfather to John Cochrane, 2nd Earl of Dundonald, William Cochrane, of Kilmaronock (who married Lady Grizel Graham, a daughter of James Graham, 2nd Marquess of Montrose), Margaret Cochrane (wife of Alexander Montgomerie, 9th Earl of Eglinton), Helen Cochrane (wife of John Gordon, 16th Earl of Sutherland), and Jean Cochrane (wife of John Graham, 1st Viscount Dundee and William, 3rd Viscount of Kilsyth).

== See also ==
- Auchans Castle, Ayrshire

Parliament of Scotland
Preceded by Sir William Cunningham; Sir Hugh Campbell	Shire Commissioner for Ayr; 1644–1647; With: Sir John Crawford 1644; Sir Hugh Campbell 1645–1647	Succeeded by Sir William Cunningham; James Fullarton
Peerage of Scotland
New creation	Earl of Dundonald; 1669–1685	Succeeded by John Cochrane
New creation	Lord Cochrane of Dundonald; 1647–1685	Succeeded by John Cochrane
