= Sir Herbert Maxwell, 7th Baronet =

British horticulturist and genealogist

The Right Honourable Sir Herbert Maxwell Bt KT PC JP DL FRS FSAScot FRGS
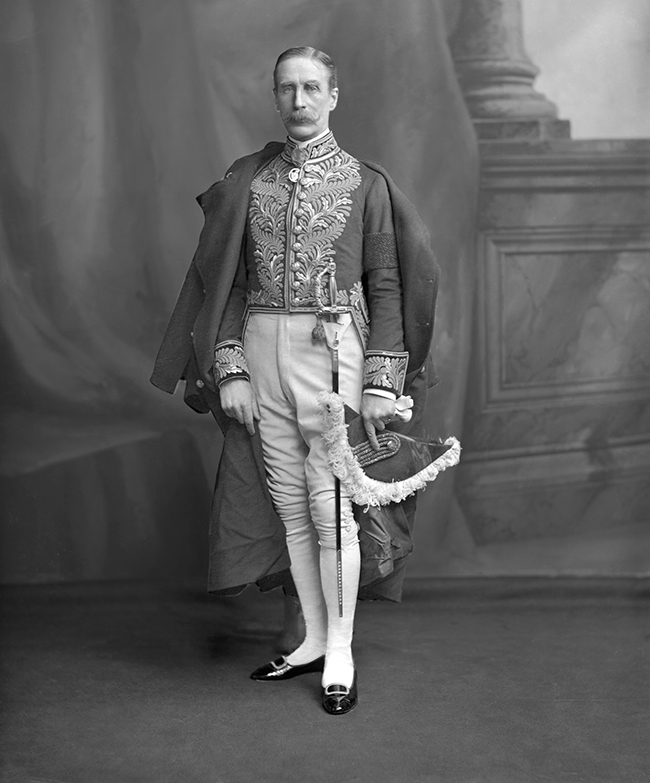
- Maxwell on 1 April 1901

Member of Parliament for Wigtownshire
- In office 1880–1906
- Preceded by: Robert Vans-Agnew
- Succeeded by: Lord Elcho

Personal details
- Born: 8 January 1845
- Died: 30 October 1937 (aged 92)
- Education: Christ Church, Oxford

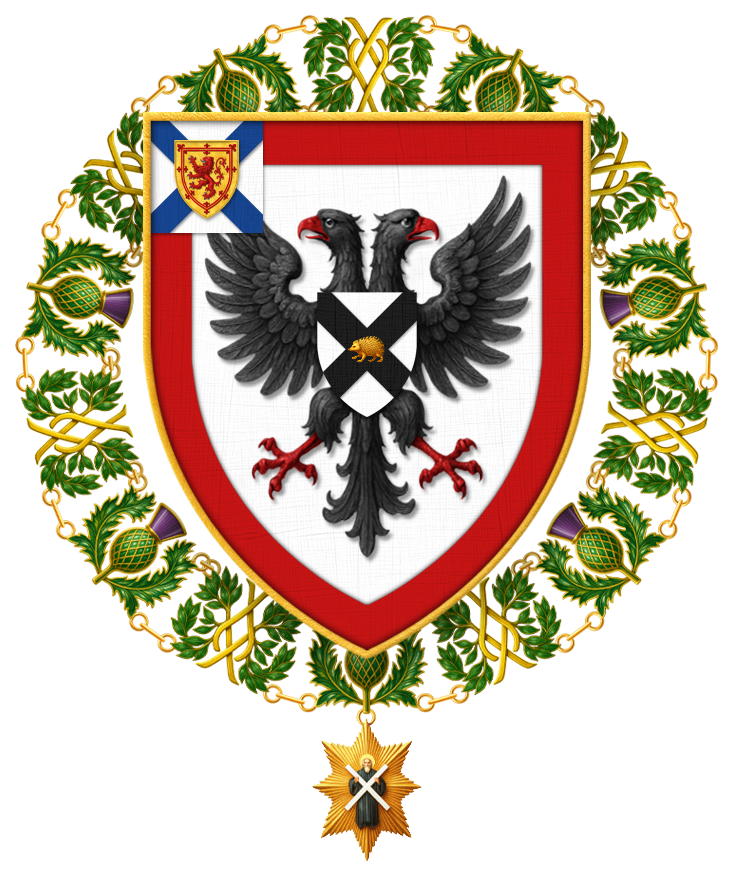
Shield of Arms of Sir Herbert Eustace Maxwell, 7th Baronet of Monreith, KT, PC, JP, DL, FRS, FSA Scot, FRGS

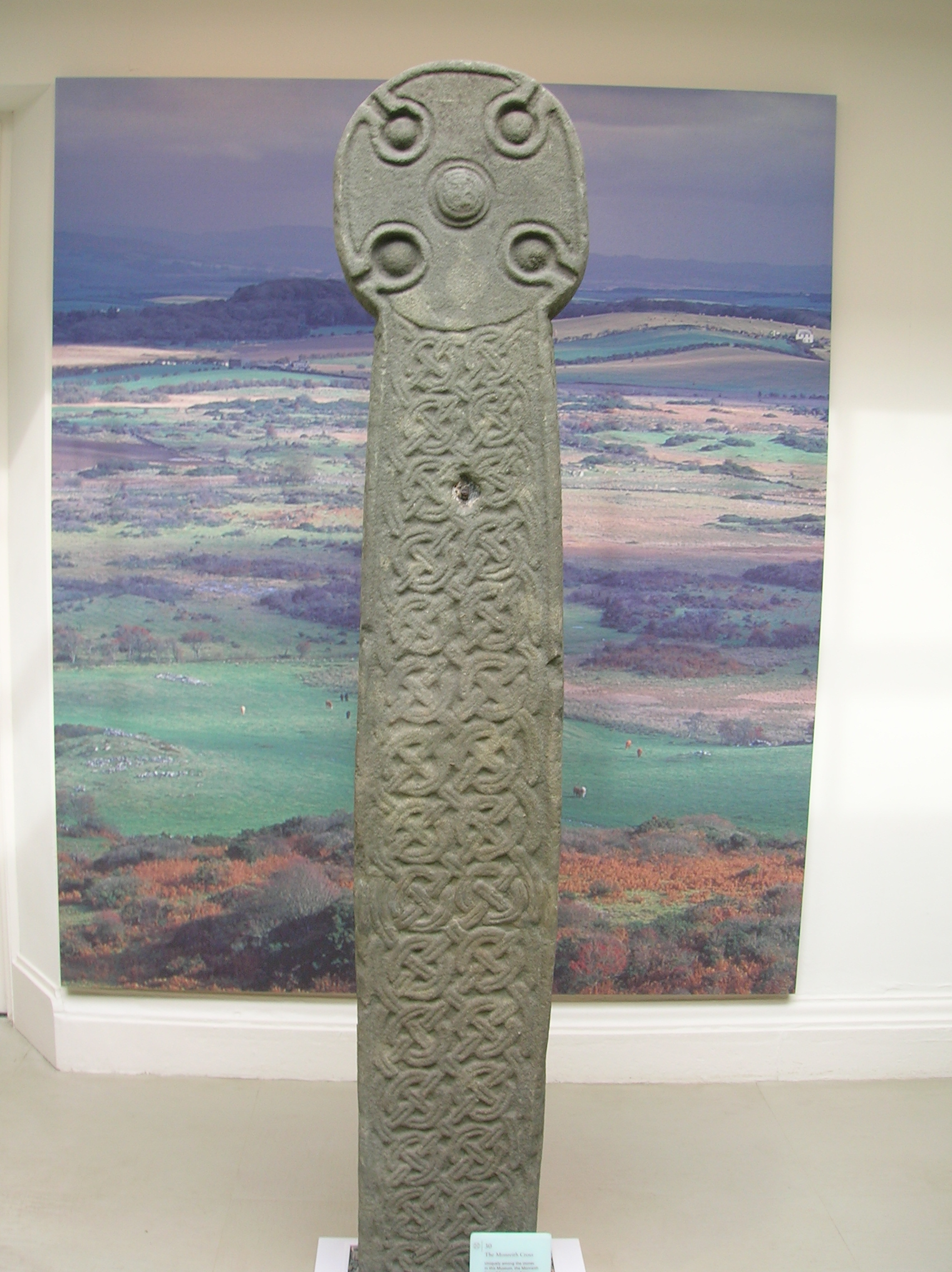
The Monreith Cross from the Mochrum Justice Hill

Sir Herbert Eustace Maxwell, 7th Baronet, Bt, KT, PC, JP, DL, FRS, FSA Scot, FRGS (8 January 1845 – 30 October 1937) was a Scottish novelist, essayist, artist, antiquarian, horticulturalist, prominent salmon angler and author of books on angling and Conservative politician who sat in the House of Commons from 1880 to 1906.

== Early life ==
A member of Clan Maxwell descended from the first Lord Maxwell of Caerlaverock Castle, Maxwell was the eldest surviving son of Lieutenant-Colonel Sir William Maxwell, 6th Baronet and his wife, Helenora Shaw-Stewart, daughter of Sir Michael Shaw-Stewart, 5th Baronet. He was educated at Eton and at Christ Church, Oxford. He was a captain in the 4th battalion Royal Scots Fusiliers and a J.P. and Deputy Lieutenant for Wigtownshire.

== Political career ==
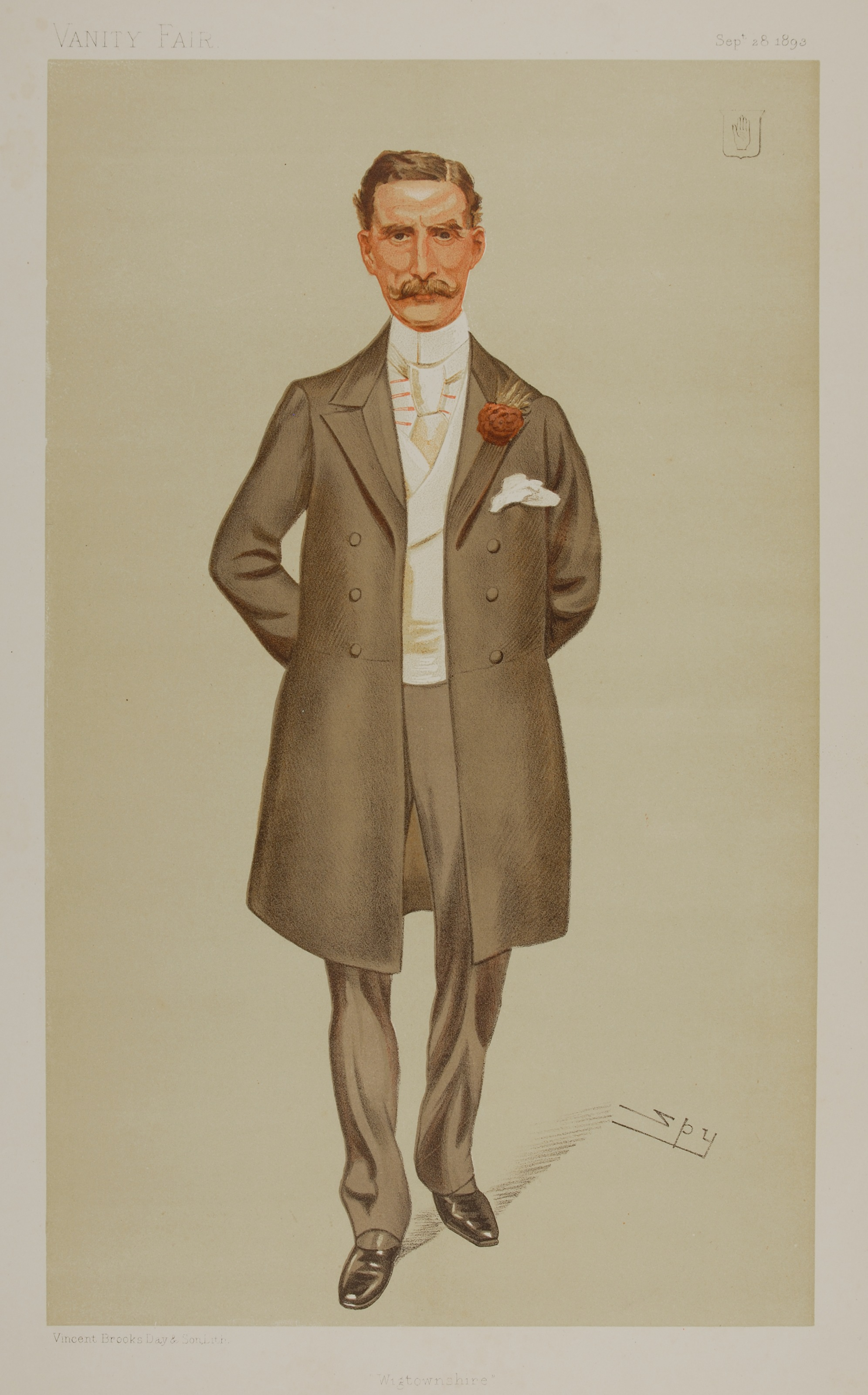
Maxwell as caricatured by Spy (Leslie Ward) in Vanity Fair, September 1893

Maxwell was elected Member of Parliament for Wigtownshire in the 1880 general election and held the seat until 1906. He served in the Conservative administration of Lord Salisbury as a Junior Lord of the Treasury from 1886 to 1892 and was admitted to the Privy Council in 1897. By April 1897, Maxwell held the chair of the Royal Commission on Tuberculosis.

He was Lord Lieutenant of Wigtown from 1903 to 1935. He was made a Knight of the Thistle in 1933. He received an honorary doctorate (LL.D) from the University of Glasgow in June 1901.

== Antiquarian interests ==
Maxwell was President of the Society of Antiquaries of Scotland (1900–1913), and Chairman of the National Library of Scotland (1925–1932). He was the chairman of Royal Commission on the Ancient and Historical Monuments of Scotland (RCAHMS) from its inception in 1908 until 1934.

Maxwell gave the Rhind Lectures in 1893, on the place names of Scotland, and again in 1912 on the early chronicles relating to Scotland. In 1913 he published a report on the Talnotrie Hoard.

He was elected a Fellow of the Royal Society in 1898 and was awarded the Victoria Medal of Honour by the Royal Horticultural Society in 1917.

== Marriage and issue ==
Maxwell married Mary Fletcher-Campbell, daughter of Henry Fletcher-Campbell, of Boquhan, Stirling, on 20 January 1869. She predeceased him on 3 September 1910. By her, he had two sons and three daughters:

- Sgt. William Maxwell (29 September 1869 – 12–19 June 1897), died on the veldt near Fort Gibbs, Mashonaland
- Ann Christian Maxwell (5 September 1871 – 5 April 1937), married Sir John Stirling-Maxwell, 10th Baronet
- Winfred Edith (19 July 1873 – 30 October 1968), married Alastair Graham-Moir of Leckie.
- Beatrice Mary (24 January 1875 – 11 April 1938), married Ernest Walker, son of Sir James Robert Walker, 2nd Baronet in St Margaret's Westminster on 10 October 1901.
- Lt. Col. Aymer Edward Maxwell (26 October 1877 – † 9 October 1914). In 1909, he married Lady Mary Percy, daughter of Henry Percy, 7th Duke of Northumberland and by her had one daughter and three sons before he died of wounds suffered at Antwerp while serving with the Lovat Scouts:
  - Christian Maxwell (31 July 1910 – 7 May 1980), died unmarried
  - Sir Aymer Maxwell, 8th Baronet (7 December 1911 – 8 July 1987)
  - Eustace Maxwell (24 February 1913 – 12 April 1971), married Dorothy Bellville, with whom he had one daughter and one son:
    - Diana Mary Maxwell (born 19 January 1942)
    - Sir Michael Maxwell, 9th Baronet (1943-2021)
  - Gavin Maxwell (15 July 1914 – 7 September 1969), naturalist, and author of Ring of Bright Water

Sir Herbert died at Monreith House, Wigtownshire, aged 92.

== Works ==
=== Novels ===
- Sir Lucian Elphin (1889)
- The Letter of the Law (1890)
- A Duke of Britain (1895)
- Chevalier of the Splendid Crest (1900)

=== Nonfiction ===
- Meridiana, Noontide Essays (1892)
- Scottish Land Names (1894)
- Post meridiana: Afternoon Essays (1895)
- Rainy Days in a Library (1896)
- Sixty Years a Queen (London: Harmsworth, 1897)
- Memories of the Months (7 series-1897 through to 1922)
- Salmon and Sea Trout (1898)
- The life of Wellington. The restoration of the martial power of Great Britain (1899)
- Robert the Bruce and the Struggle for Scottish Independence (1901)
- History of the House of Douglas-from the earliest times down to the legislative union of England and Scotland (1902), introduction by William Lindsay, Windsor Herald. Volume 1; Volume 2
- British Soldiers in the Field (1902)
- British Fresh-Water Fish (1904)
- Story of the Tweed (1905)
- Scalacronica; The reigns of Edward I, Edward II and Edward III as Recorded by Sir Thomas Gray (1907)
- Official guide to the Abbey-church, palace, and environs of Holyroodhouse (1908)
- Scottish Gardens (1908)
- Cronicles of the Houghton Fishing Club 1822-1908 (1908)
- The Making of Scotland (1911)
- The Lanercost Chronicle (1913); translated from the Latin, with notes
- Fishing at Home and Abroad (1913) in Classics of Angling Literature
- The Lowland Scots regiments : their origin, character and services previous to the great war of 1914 (1918)
- The Place Names of Galloway: Their Origin & Meaning Considered (1930)

Also "Lives" of W. H. Smith, Wellington, Romney, etc.

Parliament of the United Kingdom
| Preceded by Robert Vans-Agnew | Member of Parliament for Wigtownshire; 1880 – 1906 | Succeeded by Lord Elcho |
Honorary titles
| Preceded by The Earl of Stair | Lord Lieutenant of Wigtown; 1903–1935 | Succeeded by The Earl of Stair |
Baronetage of Nova Scotia
| Preceded by William Maxwell | Baronet (of Monreith); 1877–1937 | Succeeded by Aymer Maxwell |
