= Patrick Vanse =

Scottish army officer and politician

Sir Patrick Vans (c. 1655 – 27 January 1733) was a Scottish army officer and politician who sat in the British House of Commons between 1710 and 1722.

Vans was the only surviving son of Alexander Vans of Barnbarroch and his wife, Margaret Maxwell, daughter of William Maxwell of Monreith, Wigtown. He joined the army and was in the French military from about 1673 to 1689. He was a captain in the Enniskillen regiment from about 1690 to 1693 and a captain in Colonel George McGill's Foot from 1696 to 1697. Before 1702, he married Margaret Campbell, daughter of Sir James Campbell of Lawers, Perth. In 1706 he was a lieutenant in Colonel Roger Townshend's Foot and by April 1707 a captain in Lord Mark Kerr's Foot. Between 1710 and 1712, he served as a Lieutenant Colonel.

Vans was returned as Member of Parliament for Wigtownshire at the 1710 general election but was unseated on petition on 3 March 1711. He was on half-pay by 1714 and became a Burgess of Glasgow and Ayr in 1714. He married Barbara McDowall daughter of Patrick McDowall of Freugh, Wigtown as his second wife at the age of 60 on 28 February 1715.

Vans was returned as MP for Wigtown Burghs in the 1715 general election but did not stand in 1722.

Vans died on 27 January 1733 from an old wound received in Spain. He had a son and daughter by his first wife and two sons and three daughters by his second wife.

Parliament of Great Britain
Preceded by John Stewart	Member of Parliament for Wigtownshire; 1710–1711	Succeeded by William Dalrymple
Preceded by John Stewart	Member of Parliament for Wigtown Burghs; 1715–1722	Succeeded by William Dalrymple
