= John Stewart (Wigtownshire MP, died 1769) =

Scottish politician

John Stewart (died 1769), of Castle Stewart, Wigtownshire, was a Scottish politician.

He was a Member (MP) for Wigtownshire in 1747–1754.
