= Robert Vans-Agnew =

British politician

Robert Vans Agnew (4 March 1817 – 26 September 1893) was a Scottish Conservative Party politician.

At the 1868 general election he unsuccessfully contested the Wigtown Burghs.

Vans Agnew was elected as the Member of Parliament (MP) for Wigtownshire at a by-election in February 1873, filling the vacancy caused by Lord Garlies succeeding to the peerage as 10th Earl of Galloway . He was re-elected in 1874, and held the seat until he stood down at the 1880 general election.

== Historical works ==
Vans Agnew edited the correspondence of his ancestor Patrick Vans, Lord Barnbarroch for publication in two volumes in 1887.

- Correspondence of Sir Patrick Waus of Barnbarroch, knight, volume 1
- Correspondence of Sir Patrick Waus of Barnbarroch, knight, volume 2

Parliament of the United Kingdom
Preceded by Lord Garlies	Member of Parliament for Wigtownshire; 1873 – 1880	Succeeded by Sir Herbert Maxwell, Bt
