= 1873 Wigtownshire by-election =

UK Parliamentary by-election

The 1873 Wigtownshire by-election was fought on 21 February 1873. The by-election was fought due to the Succession to a peerage of the incumbent MP of the Conservative Party, Lord Garlies. It was won by the Conservative candidate Robert Vans-Agnew.
