= George Young, Lord Young =

Scottish Liberal MP and judge (1819–1907)

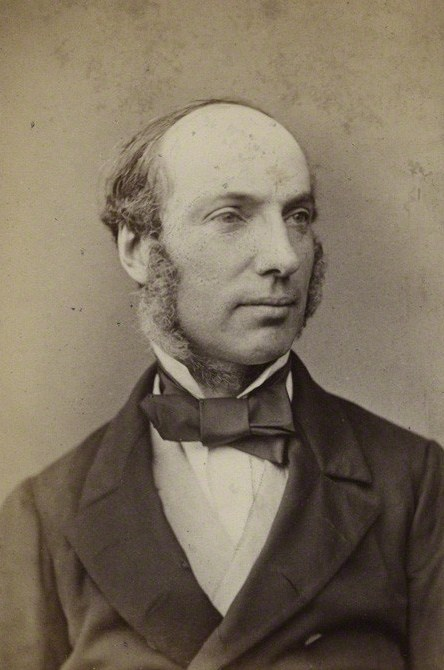
George Young, photograph about 1868

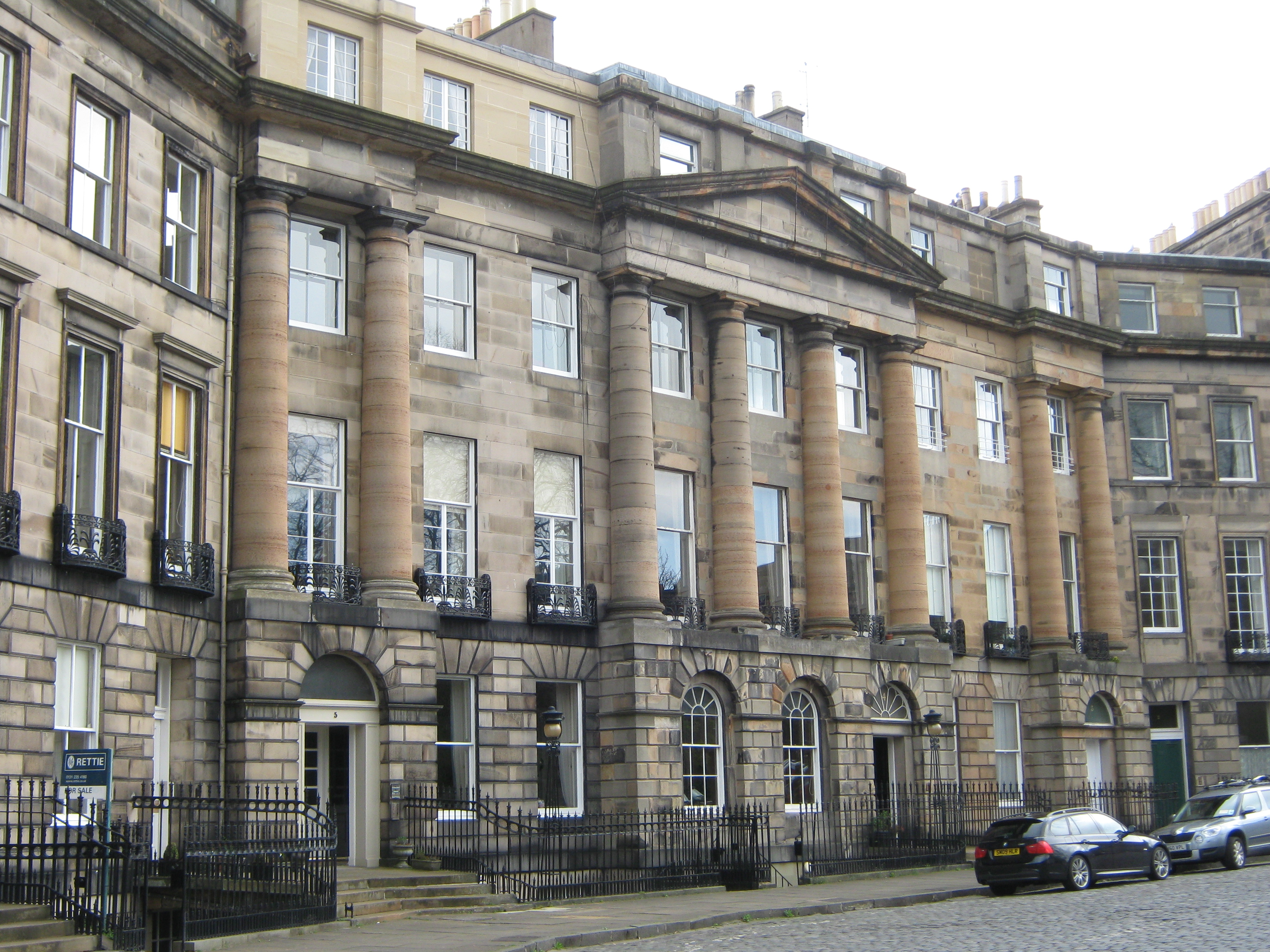
Moray Place, Edinburgh

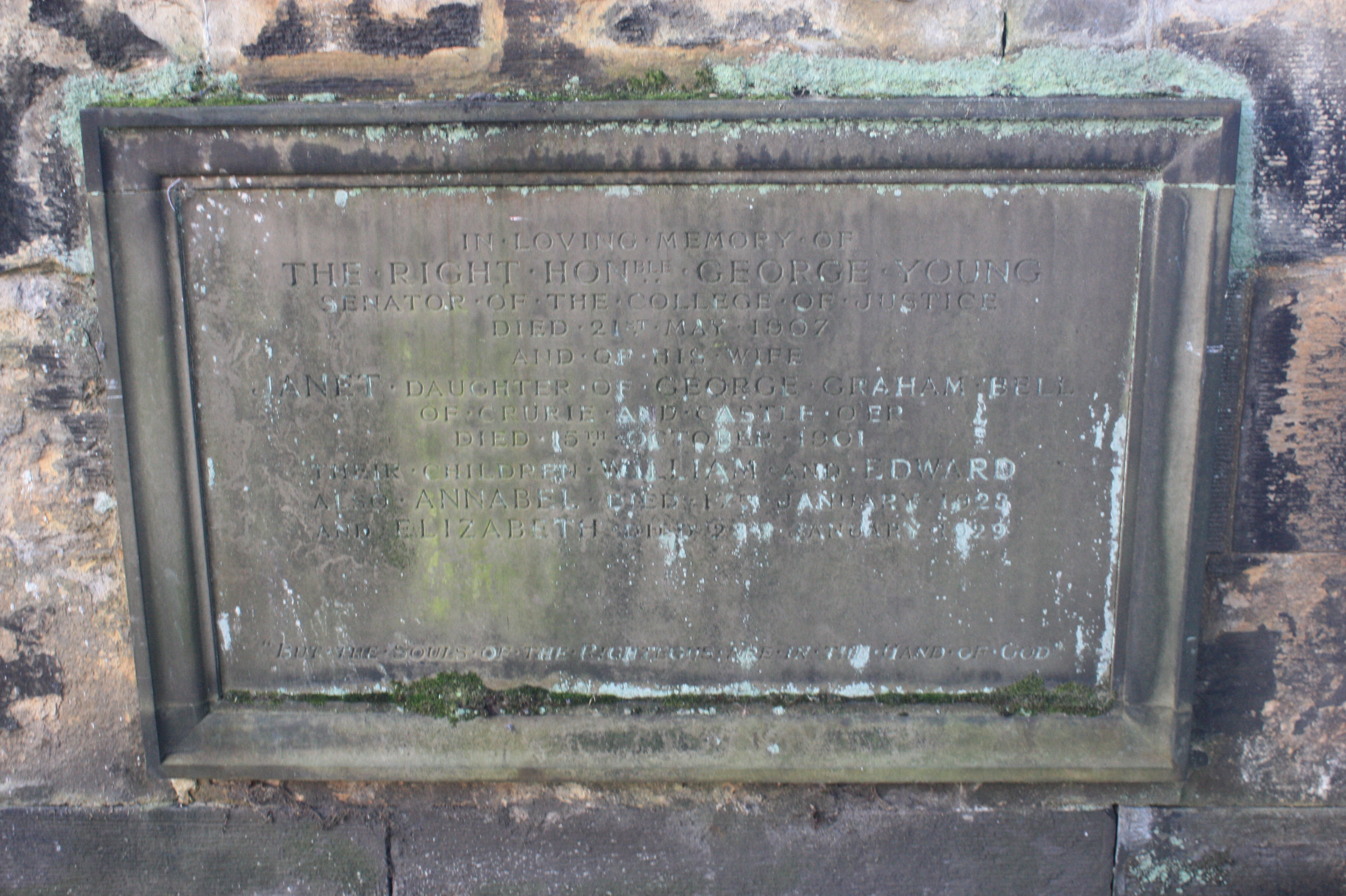
The grave of Lord Young, St John's, Edinburgh

George Young, Lord Young, PC (2 July 1819 – 21 May 1907) was a Scottish Liberal MP in the British Parliament and a judge, with the judicial title of Lord Young.

== Life ==
He was born in Dumfries and educated locally before being sent to the University of Edinburgh to study law. He became a member of the Faculty of Advocates in 1840 and was also called to the English bar. He held the judicial offices of Sheriff of Inverness in 1853–1860 and Haddington and Berwick in 1860–1862.

He was appointed Solicitor General for Scotland in 1862–1866 and 1868–1869. He was appointed Lord Advocate in 1869, the most senior legal position in Scotland, and technically a governmental post. This role is primarily one of law-making.

He represented Wigtown Burghs in 1865–1874, until he lost an election. After an election petition, that election was declared void and the seat awarded to Young on 28 May 1874. However, in June 1874, he was appointed a Judge of the Court of Session and left Parliament.

On 3 March 1874 he was created a Senator of the College of Justice with the title Lord Young. He served until 1905.

He lived his final years at 28 Moray Place on the prestigious Moray Estate in western Edinburgh.

Young is buried with his wife Janet Bell (d. 1901), daughter of George Graham Bell, near the south-west corner of St John's churchyard in Edinburgh.

== Legislation ==
The most important legislation framed and created by Lord Young was the Education (Scotland) Act 1872 under which every town and village in Scotland were obliged to give free education to both boys and girls from the age of five to the age of eleven. This created a wave of school building across Scotland. Whilst children were still permitted to attend private schools they were not permitted to attend no school, and also imbedded in this legislation is the creation of the concept of truancy.

== Family ==
He married Janet Graham Bell on 18 July 1847, and they had fourteen children. Daughter Lillias ("Lily") married Charles Kincaid Mackenzie (later styled Lord Mackenzie).

== Sources ==
- Lee, Sidney, ed. (1912). "Young, George" . Dictionary of National Biography (2nd supplement). Vol. 3. London: Smith, Elder & Co.
- Who's Who of British Members of Parliament: Volume I 1832-1885, edited by M. Stenton (The Harvester Press 1976)
- Leigh Rayment's Historical List of MPs

Parliament of the United Kingdom
Preceded by William Dunbar	Member of Parliament for Wigtown Burghs; 1865–1874	Succeeded by Mark John Stewart
Legal offices
Preceded by Edward Francis Maitland	Solicitor General for Scotland; 1862–1866	Succeeded by Edward Strathearn Gordon
Preceded by John Millar	Solicitor General for Scotland; 1868–1869	Succeeded by John Macdonald
Preceded by James Moncreiff	Lord Advocate; 1869–1874	Succeeded by Edward Strathearn Gordon
