= Francis Ommanney =

British politician (1774–1840)

Sir Francis Molyneux Ommanney (4 October 1774 – 7 November 1840) was an English politician who represented Barnstaple from 1818 to 1824.

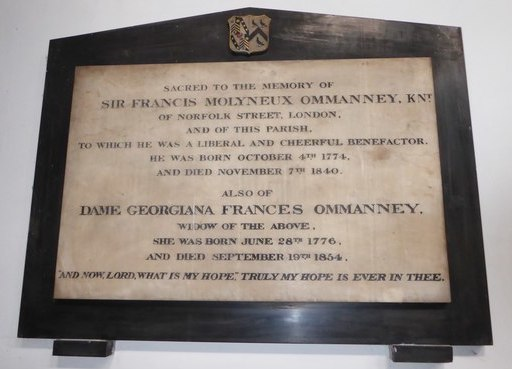
Memorial to Ommanney at St Mary the Virgin, Mortlake

The second son of Rear Admiral Cornthwaite Ommanney, and brother of Admiral Sir John Acworth Ommanney, he married Georgiana Frances Hawkes in 1801. They had nine children, including:

- Rev. Edward Aislabie Ommanney (1806–1884)
- Sir Erasmus Ommanney (1814–1904), who became an Admiral
- Colonel Octavius Ommanney (1816–1901)
- Manaton Collingwood Ommanney (1816–1857)
- Rev. George Druce Wynne Ommanney (1819–1902)
- John Orde Ommanney (d. 1846), who married Susanna McTaggart, daughter of Sir John McTaggart, 1st Baronet, and had one daughter, Marianne Susanna Ommanney, who married in 1866 Sir Mark Stewart, 1st Baronet
- Francis Ommanney, who married Julia Henrietta Metcalfe and was the father of Montagu Ommanney, head of the Colonial Office from 1900 to 1907
- Frances Georgiana Ommanney, who married Lieutenant-Colonel Edward Ommanney Hollist

A grandson later became a Rear Admiral.

Parliament of the United Kingdom
Preceded by Eyre Coote	Member of Parliament for Barnstaple; 1818–1824; With: Michael Nolan; Frederick Hodgson	Succeeded by Henry Alexander
