= William Aikman =

William Aikman may refer to:

- William Aikman (painter) (1682–1731), Scottish portrait-painter
- William Aikman (writer) (1824–1909), American writer and pastor
