= Wigtown Burghs (UK Parliament constituency) =

Former parliamentary constituency in the United Kingdom

- Former district of Burghs constituency for the House of Commons
- Major settlements: New Galloway, Stranraer, Whithorn and Wigtown

1708–1885
- Seats: One
- Created from: New Galloway; Stranraer; Whithorn; Wigtown
- Replaced by: Kirkcudbright Stewartry; Wigtownshire

Wigtown Burghs, also known as Wigton Burghs and Wigtown District of Burghs, was a constituency of the House of Commons of the Parliament of Great Britain from 1708 to 1800 and of the House of Commons of the Parliament of the United Kingdom from 1801 to 1885. It was represented by one Member of Parliament (MP).

== Creation ==
The British parliamentary constituency was created in 1708 following the Acts of Union, 1707 and replaced the former Parliament of Scotland burgh constituencies of Wigtown, New Galloway, Stranraer and Whithorn which had all been separately represented with one commissioner each.

The first election in Wigtown Burghs was in 1708. In 1707–08, members of the 1702–1707 Parliament of Scotland were co-opted to serve in the 1st Parliament of Great Britain. See Scottish representatives to the 1st Parliament of Great Britain, for further details.

== Boundaries ==
The constituency was a district of burghs created to represent the Royal burghs of New Galloway, Stranraer, Whithorn and Wigtown.

In 1885 the district was abolished. New Galloway became part of the Kirkcudbrightshire constituency and the other three burghs were included in the Wigtownshire seat.

== Political history ==
The constituency elected one Member of Parliament (MP) by the first past the post system until the seat was abolished for the 1885 general election.

The politics of this constituency in the mid-18th century were relatively simple. The Stewart family, led by the Earl of Galloway, normally controlled the burghs of Wigtown and Whithorn. The Dalrymple family, supporting the Earl of Stair, controlled Stranraer. The predominant interest in New Galloway was held by the Gordons of Kenmure.

Thus when Wigtown or Whithorn were the returning burgh, with a casting vote in the event of a tie, the candidate backed by the Stewarts won. At other elections the Dalrymple supported candidate had a chance. This state of affairs continued until 1784 when the Dalrymple interest gained control of the Whithorn Council.

In the 1754 election the Duke of Argyll attempted to support James Abercrombie for the Wigtown Burghs seat. The Earl of Galloway agreed with John Hamilton, a member of the Dalrymple family who was supposedly backing his relative Captain John Dalrymple of Stair, to support Hamilton in the Burghs seat in exchange for the Dalrymple interest backing Lord Galloway's brother (James Stewart) for the county seat. This coalition worked and John Hamilton was elected unopposed.

In 1761, with Wigtown as the returning burgh, the Earl of Galloway could name the MP. He hoped to return his Naval officer son, the Honourable Keith Stewart. As Stewart was away at sea in the West Indies, the Earl decided to support Archibald Montgomerie until his son returned. Montgomerie was also a candidate for Ayrshire in the same general election. After he was elected for both seats he decided to retain Ayrshire. Stewart was elected at a by-election but soon gave up the seat, as a result of negotiations about the Wigtownshire seat. The energetic intriguer John Hamilton was again elected for the Burghs seat in the third election there in less than a year.

In 1768, with Whithorn as the returning burgh, the Earl of Galloway could again decide the MP. For this election the Earl was trying to get a seat in England for his son, Lord Garlies, who was ineligible to represent a Scottish constituency as the eldest son of a Scottish peer. The Earl entered into an agreement with an English MP, George Augustus Selwyn, who controlled both seats in the borough of Ludgershall. Selwyn, who himself represented Gloucester, feared defeat there and wanted a safe alternative seat. In exchange for supporting Lord Garlies in Ludgershall, Selwyn was elected in the Wigtown Burghs. He was the first Englishman to be elected for a Scottish constituency after the Union. However, as Selwyn was also elected in Gloucester and preferred to represent that Borough, a new candidate was required in Scotland. The government was able to offer a Treasury nominee, Chauncy Townsend. After Townsend's death a junior branch of the Stewart family provided the new MP.

In 1774, with New Galloway as the returning burgh, an alliance of the Dalrymple and Gordon families hoped to triumph. National politics again influenced the situation, as Sir Lawrence Dundas suggested William Norton as a candidate. The Earl of Stair was trying to get his son a seat in England so he accepted the proposal of the governments electoral manager in Scotland. The Stewart interest supported the 7th Earl of Galloway's brother in law, Henry Watkin Dashwood. This was the first time two Englishmen contested a Parliamentary seat in Scotland. Norton was returned, but the seat was awarded to Dashwood after an election petition.

For the 1780 election the Earl of Stair, despite being a pro-American admirer of the Earl of Chatham, offered the nomination for the seat to Lord North in exchange for a diplomatic post for his son Lord Dalrymple. Lord North suggested William Adam.

In 1784 the change in Whithorn enabled the Dalrymple candidate (William Dalrymple) to defeat the Earl of Galloway's nominee (George Johnstone).

== Members of Parliament ==
Election	Member	Party
26 May 1708	George Lockhart (chose to sit for Midlothian)	
14 December 1708 by-election	William Cochrane	
17 September 1713	Sir Alexander Maxwell, Bt	
17 February 1715	Sir Patrick Vanse	
13 April 1722	William Dalrymple (1678–1744)	
16 March 1728 by-election	John Dalrymple	
18 May 1734	James Stewart 1st term	
28 May 1741	William Stewart (c 1706–1748)	
22 July 1747	James Stewart 2nd term	
9 May 1754	John Hamilton 1st term	
20 April 1761	Hon. Archibald Montgomerie, later 11th Earl of Eglinton	
19 February 1762 by-election	Hon. Keith Stewart	
15 April 1762 by-election	John Hamilton 2nd term	
11 April 1768	George Augustus Selwyn	
23 December 1768 by-election	Chauncy Townsend	
7 May 1770 by-election	William Stewart (1737–1797)	
31 October 1774	William Norton, later 2nd Lord Grantley	
23 March 1775 by-election	Sir Henry Dashwood, Bt	
2 October 1780	William Adam	
26 April 1784	William Dalrymple (1736–1807)	
12 July 1790	Nisbet Balfour	
20 June 1796	John Spalding	
29 July 1803 by-election	Hon. William Stewart (1774–1827)	
9 August 1805 by-election	James Graham	
24 November 1806	Hon. Edward Richard Stewart	
27 February 1809 by-election	Lyndon Evelyn	Tory
30 October 1812	Hon. James Henry Keith Stewart	Tory
21 March 1821 by-election	Sir John Osborn, Bt	Tory
4 March 1824 by-election	Nicholas Conyngham Tindal	Tory
3 July 1826	John Lowther	Tory
23 May 1831	Edward Stewart	Whig
19 January 1835	Sir John McTaggart, Bt	Whig
1 April 1857	Sir William Dunbar, Bt	Whig
1859	Sir William Dunbar, Bt	Liberal
15 April 1865 by-election	George Young	Liberal
12 Feb 1874	Mark John Stewart 1st term	Conservative
28 May 1874 petition	George Young	Liberal
15 June 1874 by-election	Mark John Stewart 1st term	Conservative
8 April 1880	John McLaren	Liberal
20 May 1880 by-election	Mark John Stewart 2nd term	Conservative
2 August 1880 by-election	Rt Hon. Sir John Dalrymple Hay, Bt	Conservative
1885	constituency abolished	

== Elections ==
The constituency had only four voters (the commissioners elected by the Burgh Councils) in 1708–1832. The place of election rotated between the Burghs and the commissioner for the returning Burgh had a casting vote if there was a tie. It was possible for the Court of Session to suspend a Burgh's rights for a Parliament, as a punishment for corruption. This procedure could disrupt the rotation

From 1832 the franchise was extended and the votes from all the burghs were added together.

- 1708 (26 May) general election (election at Wigtown)
- George Lockhart: Unopposed
- Chose to sit for Edinburghshire
- 1708 (14 December) by-election (election at Wigtown)
- William Cochrane: Unopposed
- 1710 general election
- William Cochrane: Unopposed
- 1713 (17 September) general election
- Alexander Maxwell: Unopposed
- 1715 (17 February) general election
- Patrick Vanse: Unopposed
- 1722 (13 April) general election
- William Dalrymple: Unopposed
- 1727 general election
- William Dalrymple: Unopposed
- Chose to sit for Wigtownshire
- 1728 (16 March) by-election
- John Dalrymple: Unopposed
- 1734 (18 May) general election
- John Stewart defeated John Dalrymple, vote totals unknown
- 1741 (28 May) general election
- William Stewart: Unopposed
- 1747 (22 July) general election
- John Stewart: Unopposed
- 1754 (9 May) general election (election at Stranraer)
- John Hamilton: Unopposed
- 1761 (20 April) general election (election at Wigtown)
- Archibald Montgomerie: 2 votes (Whithorn, Wigtown)
- Hutchison Mure: 2 votes (New Galloway, Stranraer)
- Montgomerie elected by Wigtown's casting vote
- Chose to sit for Ayrshire
- 1762 (19 February) by-election (election at Wigtown)
- Keith Stewart: Unopposed
- Resigned
- 1762 (15 April) by-election (election at Wigtown)
- John Hamilton: Unopposed
- 1768 (11 April) general election (election at Whithorn)
- George Augustus Selwyn: Unopposed
- Chose to sit for Gloucester
- 1768 (23 December) by-election (election at Whithorn)
- Chauncy Townsend: Unopposed
- Died
- 1770 (7 May) by-election (election at Whithorn)
- William Stewart: Unopposed
- 1774 (31 October) general election (election at New Galloway)
- William Norton: 2 votes (New Galloway, Stranraer)
- Henry Watkin Dashwood: 2 votes (Whithorn, Wigtown)
- Norton elected by New Galloway's casting vote
- 1775 (23 March) last election declared void
- Henry Watkin Dashwood: Awarded the seat
- 1780 (2 October) general election (election at Stranraer)
- William Adam: Unopposed
- Appointed Treasurer of the Ordnance
- 1783 (9 May) by-election (election at Stranraer)
- William Adam: Unopposed
- 1784 (26 April) general election (election at Wigtown)
- William Dalrymple: 3 votes (New Galloway, Stranraer, Whithorn)
- George Johnstone: 1 vote (Wigtown)
- 1790 (12 July) general election (election at Whithorn)
- Nisbet Balfour: 2 votes
- Lord Daer: 2 votes
- Balfour elected by Whithorn's casting vote
- 1796 (20 June) general election (election at New Galloway)
- John Spalding: Unopposed
- 1802 general election (election at Stranraer)
- John Spalding: 3 votes
- Robert Vans Agnew: 1 vote
- Resigned
- 1803 (29 July) by-election (election at Stranraer)
- William Stewart: Unopposed
- Resigned
- 1805 (9 August) by-election (election at Stranraer)
- James Graham: Unopposed
- 1806 (24 November) general election (election at Wigtown)
- Edward Richard Stewart: Unopposed
- 1807 general election (election at Whithorn)
- Edward Richard Stewart: Unopposed
- Appointed a Commissioner for victualling the Navy
- 1809 (27 February) by-election (election at Whithorn)
- Lyndon Evelyn (Tory): Unopposed
- 1812 (30 October) general election (election at New Galloway)
- James Henry Keith Stewart (Tory): Unopposed
- 1818 general election (election at Stranraer)
- James Henry Keith Stewart (Tory): Unopposed
- 1820 general election (election at Wigtown)
- James Henry Keith Stewart (Tory): Unopposed
- Resigned
- 1821 (21 March) by-election (election at Wigtown)
- John Osborn (Tory): Unopposed
- Appointed a Commissioner for Auditing Public Accounts
- 1824 (4 March) by-election (election at Wigtown)
- Nicholas Conyngham Tindal (Tory): Unopposed
- 1826 (3 July) general election (election at Whithorn)
- John Henry Lowther (Tory): Unopposed
- 1830 general election (election at New Galloway)
- John Henry Lowther (Tory): Unopposed
- 1831 (23 May) general election (election at Stranraer)
- Edward Stewart (Whig): Unopposed
- 1832 general election
- 316 electors, 296 voted, turnout 93.67%
- Edward Stewart (Liberal) 159 (53.72%)
- John McTaggart (Liberal) 137 (46.29%)
- majority 22 (7.43%)
- 1835 (19 January) general election
- 362 electors, 306 voted, turnout 84.53%
- John McTaggart (Liberal) 224 (73.20%)
- John Douglas (Liberal) 82 (26.80%)
- majority 142 (46.41%)
- 1837 general election
- 380 electors, 267 voted, turnout 70.26%
- John McTaggart (Liberal) 151 (56.55%)
- Andrew Agnew (Liberal) 116 (43.45%)
- majority 35 (13.11%)

=== Elections in the 1830s ===
General election 1830: Wigtown Burghs
Party	Candidate	Votes	%
Tory	John Lowther	Unopposed	
Registered electors		c. 75	
Tory hold			

General election 1831: Wigtown Burghs
Party	Candidate	Votes	%
Whig	Edward Stewart	Unopposed	
Registered electors		c. 75	
Whig gain from Tory			

General election 1832: Wigtown Burghs
Party	Candidate	Votes	%
Whig	Edward Stewart	159	53.7
Whig	John McTaggart	137	46.3
Majority		22	7.4
Turnout		296	93.7
Registered electors		316	
Whig hold			

General election 1835: Wigtown Burghs
Party	Candidate	Votes	%	±%
Whig	John McTaggart	224	73.2	+26.9
Radical	John Douglas	82	26.8	N/A
Majority		142	46.4	+39.0
Turnout		306	84.5	−9.2
Registered electors		362		
Whig hold		Swing	+26.9	

General election 1837: Wigtown Burghs
Party	Candidate	Votes	%	±%
Whig	John McTaggart	151	56.6	−16.6
Whig	Andrew Agnew	116	43.4	N/A
Majority		35	13.2	−33.2
Turnout		267	70.3	−14.2
Registered electors		380		
Whig hold		Swing	−16.6	

=== Elections in the 1840s ===
General election 1841: Wigtown Burghs
Party	Candidate	Votes	%	±%
Whig	John McTaggart	157	54.9	−1.7
Conservative	Patrick Vans Agnew	129	45.1	New
Majority		28	9.8	−3.4
Turnout		286	72.8	+2.5
Registered electors		393		
Whig hold		Swing	−1.7	

General election 1847: Wigtown Burghs
Party	Candidate	Votes	%	±%
Whig	John McTaggart	Unopposed		
Registered electors		382		
Whig hold				

=== Elections in the 1850s ===
General election 1852: Wigtown Burghs
Party	Candidate	Votes	%	±%
Whig	John McTaggart	140	50.2	N/A
Conservative	James Caird	139	49.8	New
Majority		1	0.4	N/A
Turnout		279	69.8	N/A
Registered electors		400		
Whig hold		Swing	N/A	

General election 1857: Wigtown Burghs
Party	Candidate	Votes	%	±%
Whig	William Dunbar	Unopposed		
Registered electors		694		
Whig hold				

General election 1859: Wigtown Burghs
Party	Candidate	Votes	%	±%
Liberal	William Dunbar	Unopposed		
Registered electors		505		
Liberal hold				

Dunbar was appointed a Lord Commissioner of the Treasury, requiring a by-election.

By-election, 27 June 1859: Wigtown Burghs
Party	Candidate	Votes	%	±%
Liberal	William Dunbar	Unopposed		
Liberal hold				

=== Elections in the 1860s ===
Dunbar resigned after being appointed Commissioner for Auditing the Public Accounts, causing a by-election.

By-election, 15 April 1865: Wigtown Burghs
Party	Candidate	Votes	%	±%
Liberal	George Young	Unopposed		
Liberal hold				

General election 1865: Wigtown Burghs
Party	Candidate	Votes	%	±%
Liberal	George Young	Unopposed		
Registered electors		518		
Liberal hold				

General election 1868: Wigtown Burghs
Party	Candidate	Votes	%	±%
Liberal	George Young	484	57.1	N/A
Conservative	Robert Vans-Agnew	364	42.9	New
Majority		120	14.2	N/A
Turnout		848	87.8	N/A
Registered electors		966		
Liberal hold		Swing	N/A	

Young was appointed Solicitor General for Scotland, requiring a by-election.

By-election, 4 January 1869: Wigtown Burghs
Party	Candidate	Votes	%	±%
Liberal	George Young	Unopposed		
Liberal hold				

=== Elections in the 1870s ===
General election 1874: Wigtown Burghs
Party	Candidate	Votes	%	±%
Liberal	George Young	515	50.0	−7.1
Conservative	Mark Stewart	514	50.0	+7.1
Majority		1	0.0	−14.2
Turnout		1,029	87.5	−0.3
Registered electors		1,176		
Liberal hold		Swing	−7.1	

On the initial count, Stewart had received 525 votes compared to Young's 517. However, on petition, his election was declared void and the above results were given after scrutiny. Nevertheless, by the time the petition was heard, Young had been appointed Senator of the College of Justice, and a by-election was necessitated.

By-election, 15 Jun 1874: Wigtown Burghs
Party	Candidate	Votes	%	±%
Conservative	Mark Stewart	525	50.4	+0.4
Liberal	Augustus Smith	517	49.6	−0.4
Majority		8	0.8	N/A
Turnout		1,042	88.6	+1.1
Registered electors		1,176		
Conservative gain from Liberal		Swing	+0.4	

=== Elections in the 1880s ===
General election 1880: Wigtown Burghs
Party	Candidate	Votes	%	±%
Liberal	John McLaren	650	50.5	+0.5
Conservative	Mark Stewart	638	49.5	−0.5
Majority		12	1.0	+1.0
Turnout		1,288	92.6	+5.1
Registered electors		1,391		
Liberal hold		Swing	+0.5	

McLaren was appointed Lord Advocate, requiring a by-election.

By-election, 20 May 1880: Wigtown Burghs
Party	Candidate	Votes	%	±%
Conservative	Mark Stewart	656	50.9	+1.4
Liberal	John McLaren	633	49.1	−1.4
Majority		23	1.8	N/A
Turnout		1,289	92.7	+0.1
Registered electors		1,391		
Conservative gain from Liberal		Swing	+1.4	

The by-election was declared void on petition, causing a second by-election.

By-election, 2 August 1880: Wigtown Burghs
Party	Candidate	Votes	%	±%
Conservative	John Dalrymple-Hay	636	50.6	+1.1
Liberal	Gilbert McMicking	620	49.4	−1.1
Majority		16	1.2	N/A
Turnout		1,256	90.3	−2.3
Registered electors		1,391		
Conservative gain from Liberal		Swing	+1.1	

== Sources ==
- The Parliaments of England by Henry Stooks Smith (1st edition published in three volumes 1844–50), 2nd edition edited (in one volume) by F.W.S. Craig (Political Reference Publications 1973)
- History of Parliament: House of Commons 1754-1790, by Sir Lewis Namier and James Brooke (Sidgwick & Jackson 1964)
- British Parliamentary Election Results 1832-1885, compiled and edited by F.W.S. Craig (The Macmillan Press 1977)
- Leigh Rayment's Historical List of MPs – Constituencies beginning with "W" (part 4)
