= Wigtownshire (UK Parliament constituency) =

Parliamentary constituency in the United Kingdom, 1801–1918

- Former county constituency for the House of Commons
- Subdivisions of Scotland: Wigtownshire

1708–1918
- Seats: One
- Created from: Wigtownshire
- Replaced by: Galloway

Wigtownshire, was a Scottish constituency of the House of Commons of the Parliament of Great Britain from 1708 to 1801 and of the Parliament of the United Kingdom from 1801 to 1918. It was represented by one Member of Parliament.

== Creation ==
The British parliamentary constituency was created in 1708 following the Acts of Union, 1707 and replaced the former Parliament of Scotland shire constituency of Wigtownshire which had previously been represented by two Shire Commissioners. The first British general election in Wigtownshire was in 1708. In 1707–08, members of the 1702–1707 Parliament of Scotland were co-opted to serve in the 1st Parliament of Great Britain. See Scottish representatives to the 1st Parliament of Great Britain, for further details.

== Boundaries ==
Wigtownshire was a Scottish shire (later known as a county). The constituency included the whole shire, except that between 1708 and 1885 the burghs of Stranraer, New Galloway, Whithorn and Wigtown, formed part of the Wigtown Burghs constituency.

== History ==
The constituency elected one Member of Parliament (MP) by the first past the post system until the seat was abolished in 1918. In 1918 the Wigtownshire area was combined with Kirkcudbrightshire to form the Galloway constituency.

== Members of Parliament ==
Election	Member	Party	Notes
1708, 17 June	John Stewart (c 1670–1748)		
1710, 10 November	Patrick Vanse		Unseated on petition
1711, 3 March	John Stewart (c 1670–1748)		Seated on petition
1727, 21 September	William Dalrymple		
1741, 15 May	James Stewart (c 1699–1768)		
1747, 31 July	John Stewart (?-c 1769)		
1754, 2 May	James Stewart		
1761, 23 April	John Hamilton		Resigned
1762, 18 March	James Murray		Of Cally and Broughton
1768, 22 April	Keith Stewart		Appointed Receiver of Land Taxation for Scotland
1784, 17 September	Andrew McDouall		Returned at a by-election
1796, 17 June	William Stewart		
1802, 27 July	Andrew McDouall		Resigned
1805, 15 April	William Maxwell	Tory	Returned at a by-election
1812, 28 October	Sir William Stewart		Resigned
1816, 2 August	James Hunter-Blair		Returned at a by-election; resigned
1822, 30 July	Sir William Maxwell	Tory	Returned at a by-election
1830, 17 August	Sir Andrew Agnew, 7th Baronet	Whig	
1837, 5 August	James Blair	Conservative	
1841, 15 July	John Dalrymple; Viscount Dalrymple (from 1853)	Whig	Resigned; the 10th Earl of Stair from 1864
1856, 9 February	Sir Andrew Agnew, 8th Baronet	Whig	Returned at a by-election; joined the Liberal Party
1859	Sir Andrew Agnew, 8th Baronet	Liberal	
1868, 21 November	Alan Stewart, Lord Garlies	Conservative	Succeeded as the 10th Earl of Galloway
1873, 24 February	Robert Vans-Agnew	Conservative	Returned at a by-election
1880, 10 April	Sir Herbert Maxwell, 7th Baronet	Conservative	
1906, 23 January	John Dalrymple, Viscount Dalrymple	Conservative	Succeeded as the 12th Earl of Stair
1915, 12 February	Hon. Hew Hamilton Dalrymple	Conservative	Returned at a by-election
1918	constituency abolished		

== Pre-1832 election results ==
=== Elections in the 1830s ===
General election 1830: Wigtownshire
Party	Candidate	Votes	%
Whig	Andrew Agnew	Unopposed	
Registered electors		70	
Whig gain from Tory			

General election 1831: Wigtownshire
Party	Candidate	Votes	%
Whig	Andrew Agnew	17	51.5
Whig	Hugh Hathorn	16	48.5
Majority		1	3.0
Turnout		33	47.1
Registered electors		70	
Whig hold			

== Election results 1832-1868 ==
=== Elections in the 1830s ===
General election 1832: Wigtownshire
Party	Candidate	Votes	%
Whig	Andrew Agnew	Unopposed	
Registered electors		845	
Whig hold			

General election 1835: Wigtownshire
Party	Candidate	Votes	%
Whig	Andrew Agnew	340	54.3
Conservative	James Blair	228	36.4
Radical	John Douglas	58	9.3
Majority		112	17.9
Turnout		626	71.5
Registered electors		875	
Whig hold			

General election 1837: Wigtownshire
Party	Candidate	Votes	%	±%
Conservative	James Blair	362	53.6	+17.2
Whig	Alexander Murray	314	46.4	−7.9
Majority		48	7.2	N/A
Turnout		676	80.7	+9.2
Registered electors		838		
Conservative gain from Whig		Swing	+12.6	

=== Elections in the 1840s ===
General election 1841: Wigtownshire
Party	Candidate	Votes	%	±%
Whig	John Dalrymple	403	50.4	+4.0
Conservative	James Blair	397	49.6	−4.0
Majority		6	0.8	N/A
Turnout		800	77.0	−3.7
Registered electors		1,039		
Whig gain from Conservative		Swing	+4.0	

General election 1847: Wigtownshire
Party	Candidate	Votes	%	±%
Whig	John Dalrymple	Unopposed		
Registered electors		1,095		
Whig hold				

=== Elections in the 1850s ===
General election 1852: Wigtownshire
Party	Candidate	Votes	%	±%
Whig	John Dalrymple	Unopposed		
Registered electors		1,272		
Whig hold				

Dalrymple resigned by accepting the office of Steward of the Manor of Northstead, causing a by-election.

By-election, 9 February 1856: Wigtownshire
Party	Candidate	Votes	%	±%
Whig	Andrew Agnew	Unopposed		
Whig hold				

General election 1857: Wigtownshire
Party	Candidate	Votes	%	±%
Whig	Andrew Agnew	Unopposed		
Registered electors		1,357		
Whig hold				

General election 1859: Wigtownshire
Party	Candidate	Votes	%	±%
Liberal	Andrew Agnew	Unopposed		
Registered electors		1,464		
Liberal hold				

=== Elections in the 1860s ===
General election 1865: Wigtownshire
Party	Candidate	Votes	%	±%
Liberal	Andrew Agnew	484	51.5	N/A
Conservative	Alan Stewart	456	48.5	New
Majority		28	3.0	N/A
Turnout		940	86.5	N/A
Registered electors		1,087		
Liberal hold		Swing	N/A	

== Election results 1868-1880 ==
=== Elections in the 1860s ===
General election 1868: Wigtownshire
Party	Candidate	Votes	%	±%
Conservative	Alan Stewart	719	52.4	+3.9
Liberal	Andrew Agnew	652	47.6	−3.9
Majority		67	4.8	N/A
Turnout		1,371	90.4	+3.9
Registered electors		1,517		
Conservative gain from Liberal		Swing	+3.9	

=== Elections in the 1870s ===
Stewart succeeded to the peerage, becoming Earl of Galloway.

By-election, 24 Feb 1873: Wigtownshire
Party	Candidate	Votes	%	±%
Conservative	Robert Vans-Agnew	713	52.1	−0.3
Liberal	John Dalrymple	656	47.9	+0.3
Majority		57	4.2	−0.6
Turnout		1,369	88.4	−2.0
Registered electors		1,549		
Conservative hold		Swing	−0.3	

General election 1874: Wigtownshire
Party	Candidate	Votes	%	±%
Conservative	Robert Vans-Agnew	Unopposed		
Registered electors		1,553		
Conservative hold				

=== Elections in the 1880s ===
General election 1880: Wigtownshire
Party	Candidate	Votes	%	±%
Conservative	Herbert Maxwell	768	51.5	N/A
Liberal	John Dalrymple	722	48.5	New
Majority		46	3.0	N/A
Turnout		1,490	89.9	N/A
Registered electors		1,657		
Conservative hold		Swing	N/A	

== Election results 1885-1918 ==
Decades:	1880s; 1890s; 1900s; 1910s

=== Elections in the 1880s ===
General election 1885: Wigtownshire
Party	Candidate	Votes	%	±%
Conservative	Herbert Maxwell	2,704	50.7	−0.8
Liberal	Hew Hamilton Dalrymple	2,625	49.3	+0.8
Majority		79	1.4	−1.6
Turnout		5,329	88.8	−1.1
Registered electors		6,004		
Conservative hold		Swing	-0.8	

General election 1886: Wigtownshire
Party	Candidate	Votes	%	±%
Conservative	Herbert Maxwell	2,920	62.9	+12.2
Liberal	John Phillips Coldstream	1,719	37.1	−12.2
Majority		1,201	25.8	+24.4
Turnout		4,639	77.3	−11.5
Registered electors		6,004		
Conservative hold		Swing	+12.2	

In July 1886, Sir Herbert Maxwell accepted office as a Junior Lord of the Treasury, causing a by-election.

By-election, 12 Aug 1886: Wigtownshire
Party	Candidate	Votes	%	±%
Conservative	Herbert Maxwell	Unopposed		
Conservative hold				

=== Elections in the 1890s ===
General election 1892: Wigtownshire
Party	Candidate	Votes	%	±%
Conservative	Herbert Maxwell	2,895	63.4	+0.5
Liberal	John Phillips Coldstream	1,670	36.6	−0.5
Majority		1,225	26.8	+1.0
Turnout		4,565	81.3	+4.0
Registered electors		5,613		
Conservative hold		Swing	+0.5	

General election 1895: Wigtownshire
Party	Candidate	Votes	%	±%
Conservative	Herbert Maxwell	Unopposed		
Conservative hold				

=== Elections in the 1900s ===
General election 1900: Wigtownshire
Party	Candidate	Votes	%	±%
Conservative	Herbert Maxwell	Unopposed		
Conservative hold				

Waring

General election 1906: Wigtownshire
Party	Candidate	Votes	%	±%
Conservative	John Dalrymple	2,866	57.4	N/A
Liberal	Walter Waring	2,127	42.6	New
Majority		739	14.8	N/A
Turnout		4,993	87.6	N/A
Registered electors		5,698		
Conservative hold				

=== Elections in the 1910s ===
Macpherson

General election January 1910: Wigtownshire
Party	Candidate	Votes	%	±%
Conservative	John Dalrymple	2,777	56.5	−0.9
Liberal	Ian Macpherson	2,142	43.5	+0.9
Majority		635	13.0	−1.8
Turnout		4,919	86.6	−1.0
Conservative hold		Swing	-0.9	

General election December 1910: Wigtownshire
Party	Candidate	Votes	%	±%
Conservative	John Dalrymple	Unopposed		
Conservative hold				

General Election 1914–15:

Another General Election was required to take place before the end of 1915. The political parties had been making preparations for an election to take place and by July 1914, the following candidates had been selected;

- Unionist:
- Liberal:

At the 1915 Wigtownshire by-election, Hew Hamilton Dalrymple (Conservative) was returned unopposed on 12 February 1915.

== Sources ==
- British Parliamentary Election Results 1832-1885, compiled and edited by F.W.S. Craig (Macmillan Press 1977)
- British Parliamentary Election Results 1885-1918, compiled and edited by F.W.S. Craig (Macmillan Press 1974)
- The Parliaments of England by Henry Stooks Smith (1st edition published in three volumes 1844–50), second edition edited (in one volume) by F.W.S. Craig (Political Reference Publications 1973))
- Leigh Rayment's Historical List of MPs – Constituencies beginning with "W" (part 4)
