= Countess of Galloway =

Countess of Galloway is a title given to the wife of the Earl of Galloway. The title has been held by several women, including:

- Anne Stewart, Countess of Galloway (née Dashwood; 1743–1830) (wife of the 7th Earl)
- Jane Stewart, Countess of Galloway (née Paget; 1774–1842) (wife of the 8th Earl)
- Harriet Stewart, Countess of Galloway (née Somerset; 1811–1885) (wife of the 9th Earl)
- Arabella Stewart, Countess of Galloway (née Cecil; 1850–1903), sister of the 3rd Marquess of Salisbury (wife of the 10th Earl)
