= Admiral Stewart =

Admiral Stewart may refer to:

- Alexander Stewart, Duke of Albany (c. 1454–1485), Lord High Admiral of Scotland
- Charles Stewart (American Navy officer) (1778–1869), U.S. Navy rear admiral
- Charles Stewart (Royal Navy officer) (1681–1741), British Royal Navy vice admiral
- Charles Stewart, 3rd Duke of Richmond (1639–1672), Great Admiral of Scotland
- Francis Stewart, 5th Earl of Bothwell (c. 1562–1612), Lord High Admiral of Scotland
- George Stewart, 8th Earl of Galloway (1768–1834), British Royal Navy admiral
- Houston Stewart (1791–1875), British Royal Navy admiral
- James Stewart, 1st Duke of Richmond (1612–1655), Lord High Admiral of Scotland
- James P. Stewart (1924–2019), U.S. Coast Guard vice admiral
- Keith Stewart (1739–1795), British Royal Navy vice admiral
- Keith Stewart (1814-1879), British Royal Navy Admiral
- William Houston Stewart (1822–1901), British Royal Navy admiral

== See also ==
- James Steuart (Royal Navy officer) (1678–1757), British Royal Navy admiral
- Charles Gage Stuart (1887–1970), British Royal Navy rear admiral
- Lord George Stuart (1780–1841), British Royal Navy rear admiral
