= Thames City =

Highrise residential development in London

- No. 8 and No. 9 Thames City

General information
- Type: Residential
- Location: Vauxhall, London
- Coordinates: 51.483202°N 0.128887°W
- Construction started: 2018
- Completed: 2022 (first phase)

Height
- Roof: 176 m (577 ft)

Technical details
- Floor count: 54

Design and construction
- Architecture firm: SOM, Squire & Partners and WilkinsonEyre

Thames City sometimes One Thames City is a residential development in Vauxhall, London. The development is part of the wider Nine Elms and Vauxhall redevelopment, with Thames City being one of the largest schemes in the area. It includes three towers in the emerging skyscraper cluster of Vauxhall, the tallest of the towers, No. 8, reaching 176 m (577 ft).

The first phase of construction, including No. 8 was completed in 2022 apart from No. 10, which has been put on hold. Phase 2, the lowrise section of the development, was announced in 2026 with an expected completion in 2028.

== Background ==
The site of the development was formerly occupied by New Covent Garden Market. The market was set to move to a new site nearby in 2012, opening up space for a new development. This was originally known as Nine Elms Square with Skidmore, Owings & Merrill commissioned to draw up plans, with planning permission first granted in 2014. VINCI and St Modwen were first chosen as developers. Aiming to sell to the Chinese development company Dalian Wanda in 2017, the buyers were forced to withdraw with pressure from the Chinese government. The development was instead sold to R&F Properties and CC Land who oversaw the completion of phase one. Subsequently, R&F Properties sold its 50% share to CC Land in 2022.

== Design ==
The plans involve three towers, rising to 176 m, 157 m and 125 m. They form the southern flank of an open public square and gardens in the centre with further lowrise residentail buildings to the north. The gardens form a "Linear Park", and include part of a connected walkway which will run through the Nine Elms development from east to west.

== See also ==
- List of tallest buildings and structures in London
- One Nine Elms
- Embassy Gardens
- Vauxhall Square
