= Algernon Turnor =

British civil servant (1845–1921)

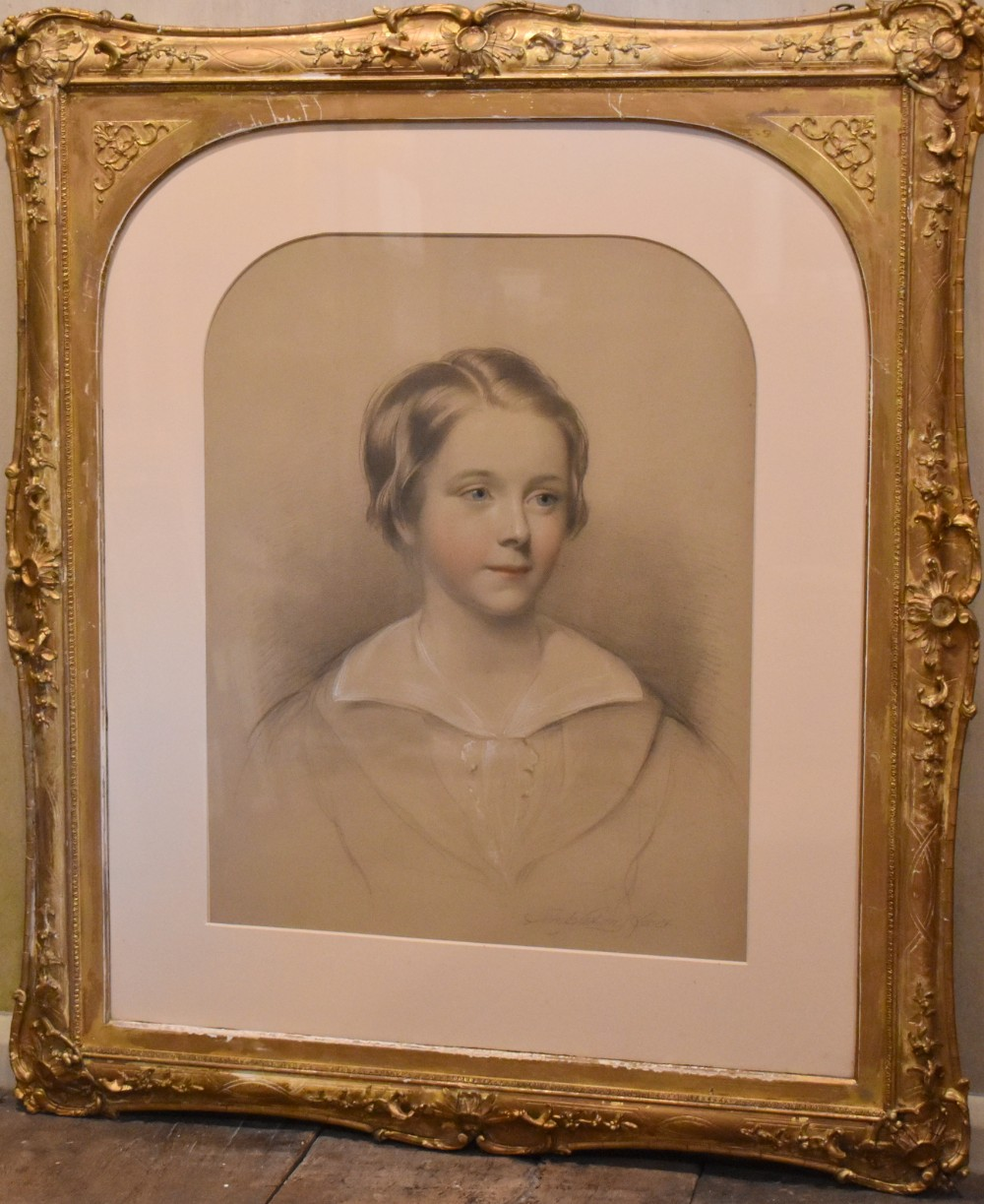
Algernon Turnor by John Samuelson (Samuel) Templeton circa 1849

Algernon Turnor CB JP (14 November 1845 – 11 December 1921), CB, was a British civil servant who was financial secretary to the British General Post Office.

He was the third son of Christopher Turnor (MP) and Lady Caroline Finch-Hatton, daughter of 10th Earl of Winchilsea and Lady Charlotte Graham, daughter of 3rd Duke of Montrose.

Algernon Turnor married Lady Henrietta, daughter of Randolph Stewart, 9th Earl of Galloway and Lady Harriet Blanche Somerset, daughter of Henry Somerset, 6th Duke of Beaufort, on 3 August 1880. One of his sons, Major Herbert Broke Turnor (1885-1969) married Lady Enid Fane, they were parents of Rosemary Sybil Turnor, who married Alastair McCorquodale, their son in turn was Neil McCorquodale who married Lady Sarah Spencer (eldest sister to Diana, Princess of Wales).

His son Major Herbert Broke Turnor would later inherit the Turnor family's estate.

Turnor was the Private Secretary to the Prime Minister, 1st Earl of Beaconsfield in 1874. Correspondence between Turnor and Lord Beaconsfield is held is the special collections of the Bodleian Library at Oxford University. A significant amount of material relating to Turnor's position at the Post Office is held by the British Postal Museum & Archive.
