= Alan Stewart, 10th Earl of Galloway =

British peer and politician

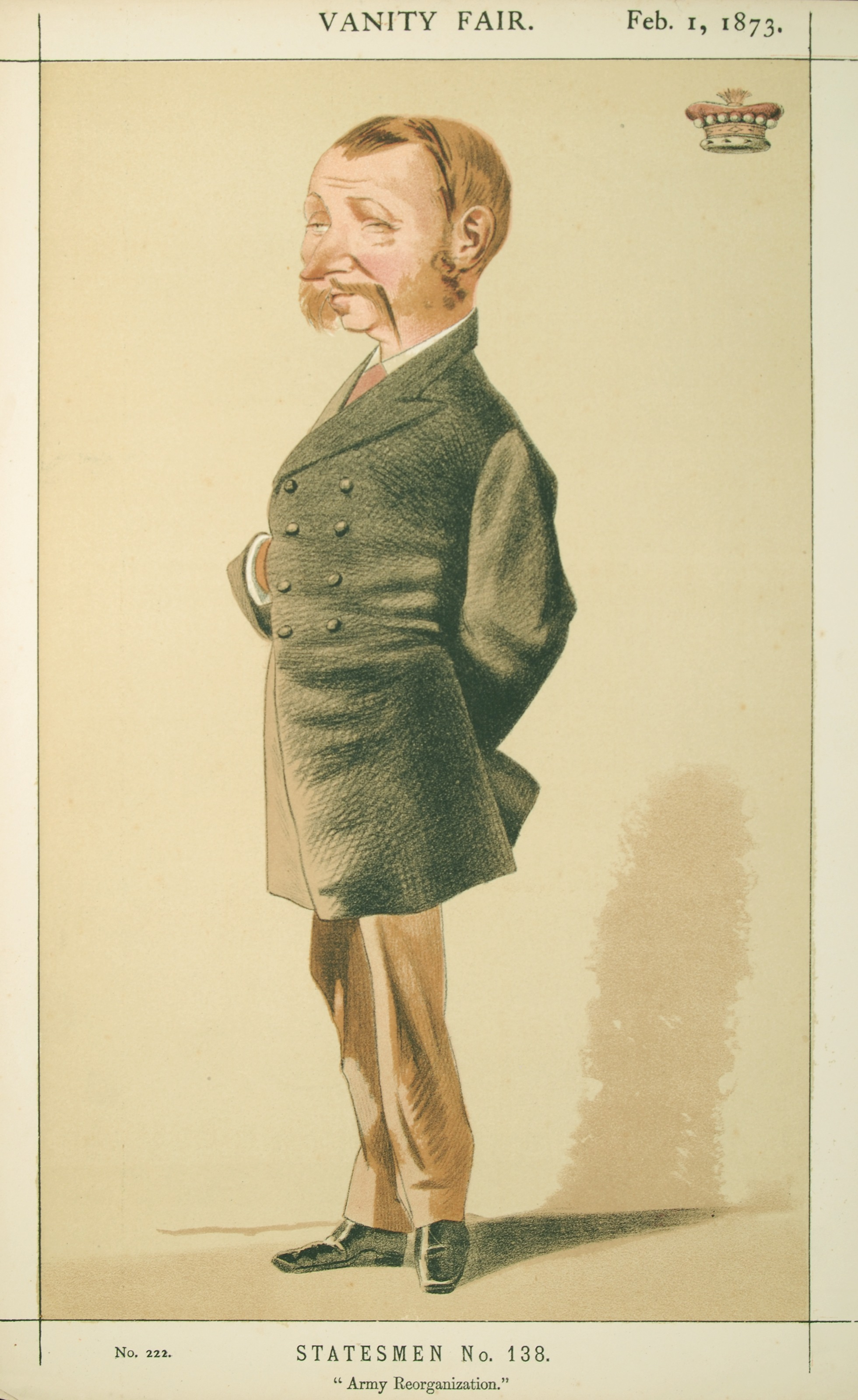
- Vanity Fair caricature by Melchiorre Delfico, February 1873.

Lord High Commissioner to the General Assembly of the Church of Scotland
- In office 1876-1877

Member of Parliament for Wigtownshire
- In office 1868-1873

Personal details
- Born: 21 October 1835
- Died: 7 February 1901 (aged 65)
- Spouse: Arabella Gascoyne-Cecil (m. 1872)
- Children: 1+
- Parents: Randolph Stewart (father); Harriett Somerset (mother)

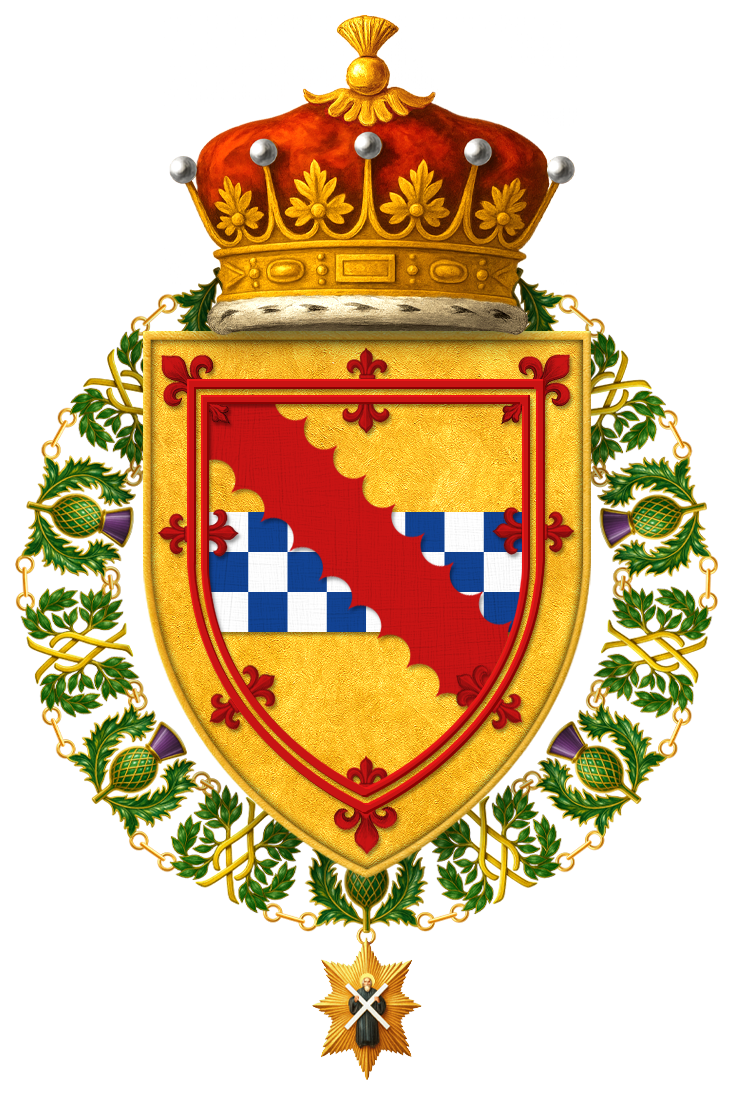
Shield of Arms of Alan Plantagenet Stewart, 10th Earl of Galloway, KT, DL, JP

Alan Plantagenet Stewart, 10th Earl of Galloway, KT, DL, JP (21 October 1835 – 7 February 1901), styled Lord Garlies until 1873, was a British peer and politician.

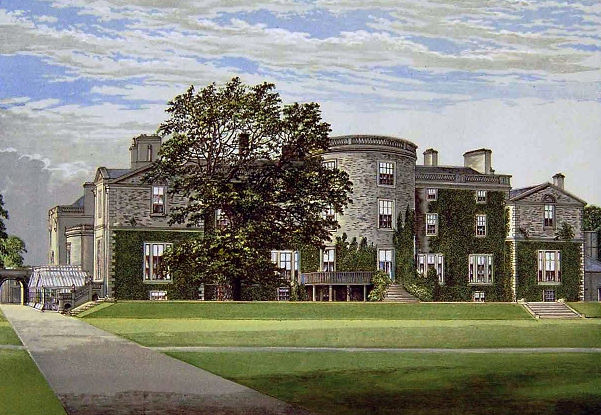
Galloway House c.1800

== Background ==
Galloway was the eldest son of Randolph Stewart, 9th Earl of Galloway, and Lady Harriett Blanche, daughter of Henry Somerset, 6th Duke of Beaufort. He was educated at Harrow School and Christ Church, Oxford.

== Cricket ==
He played first-class cricket for the Marylebone Cricket Club between 1858 and 1864.

== Public life ==
Galloway sat as Member of Parliament for Wigtownshire between 1868 and 1873. The latter year he succeeded to his father's earldom and estates, including the family seats of Galloway House and Cumloden House, and entered the House of Lords.

He was also Lord High Commissioner to the General Assembly of the Church of Scotland from 1876 to 1877 and a justice of the peace and deputy lieutenant for Kirkcudbrightshire and Wigtownshire. In December 1887 he was appointed a Knight of the Thistle.

== Personal life ==
Lord Galloway married Lady Arabella Arthur, daughter of James Gascoyne-Cecil, 2nd Marquess of Salisbury, in 1872 (he was consequently the brother-in-law of Prime Minister Robert Gascoyne-Cecil, 3rd Marquess of Salisbury). Lord Galloway died in February 1901, aged 65, and was succeeded in the earldom by his younger brother, Randolph. Lady Galloway died in August 1903.

On 14 October 1889, The Earl of Galloway appeared in Dumfries Sheriff Court on a charge of indecent behaviour towards a young girl. He was found 'not guilty'.

On 23 January 1890, the Earl of Galloway appeared again in court, Glasgow Central Police Court, charged with having been 'riotous, disorderly or indecent' in his behaviour, by accosting, following and molesting Margaret Brown and one or more female passengers. The charge was found 'not proven'.

He owned 79,000 acres in Scotland.

== Ancestry ==
Ancestors of Alan Stewart, 10th Earl of Galloway

Alexander Stewart, 6th Earl of Galloway
John Stewart, 7th Earl of Galloway
Lady Catherine Cochrane
Admiral George Stewart, 8th Earl of Galloway
Sir James Dashwood, 2nd Baronet
Anne Dashwood
Elizabeth Spencer
Randolph Stewart, 9th Earl of Galloway
Sir Nicholas Bayly, 2nd Baronet
Henry Paget, 1st Earl of Uxbridge
Caroline Paget
Lady Jane Paget
Very Rev. Arthur Champagné, Dean of Clonmacnoise
Jane Champagné
Jane Forbes
Alan Stewart, 10th Earl of Galloway
Charles Somerset, 4th Duke of Beaufort
Henry Somerset, 5th Duke of Beaufort
Elizabeth Berkeley
Henry Somerset, 6th Duke of Beaufort
Admiral Rt. Hon. Edward Boscawen
Elizabeth Boscawen
Frances Evelyn Glanville
Lady Harriet Somerset Blanche Somerset
John Leveson-Gower, 1st Earl Gower
Granville Leveson-Gower, 1st Marquess of Stafford
Lady Evelyn Pierrepont
Lady Charlotte Sophia Leveson-Gower
Alexander Stewart, 6th Earl of Galloway
Lady Susanna Stewart
Lady Catherine Cochrane

Parliament of the United Kingdom
Preceded by Sir Andrew Agnew, Bt	Member of Parliament for Wigtownshire; 1868–1873	Succeeded by Robert Vans-Agnew
Peerage of Scotland
Preceded by Randolph Stewart	Earl of Galloway; 1873–1901	Succeeded by Randolph Henry Stewart
