= R&F =

R&F may refer to:

- Ron and Fez, an American radio talk show hosted by Ron Bennington and Fez "Marie" Whatley
- R&F Properties, a Chinese property developer
- Guangzhou R&F F.C., a Chinese professional football club owned by R&F Properties
- R&F F.C. (Hong Kong), a Hong Kong professional football club, satellite team of Guangzhou R&F F.C.
