= One Nine Elms =

Mixed-use skyscraper

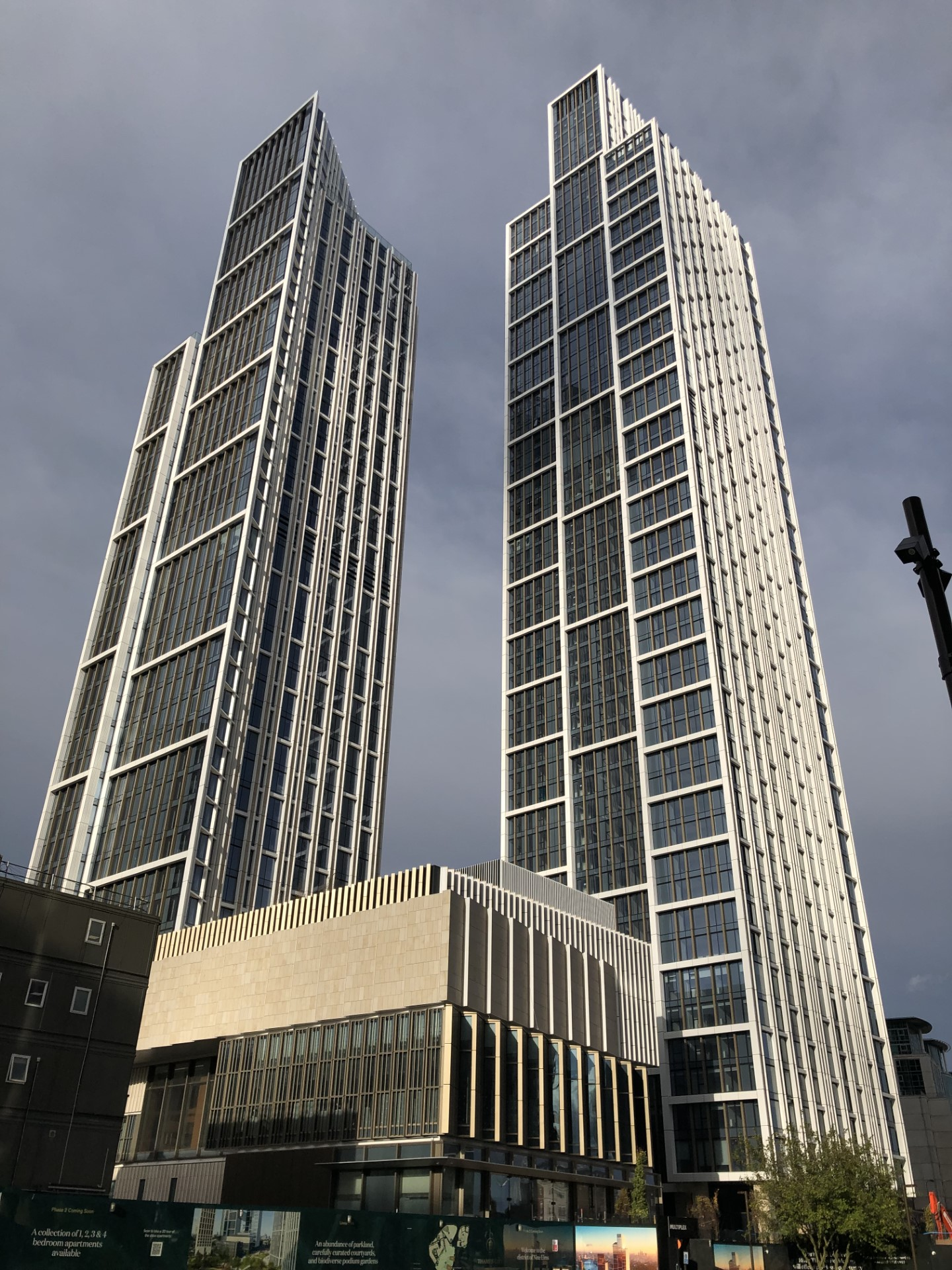
- One Nine Elms in October 2023

General information
- Status: Completed
- Type: Residential & hotel
- Location: London, SW8; United Kingdom, 1 Nine Elms Lane
- Coordinates: 51.484827°N 0.128072°W
- Construction started: 2015
- Completed: 2024
- Cost: 1 billion
- Owner: Cheung Chung-kiu

Height
- Roof: 199.4 m (654 ft)/160.1 m (525 ft)

Technical details
- Floor count: 58/42

Design and construction
- Architecture firm: Kohn Pedersen Fox (KPF)
- Structural engineer: AKT II
- Quantity surveyor: Gleeds
- Main contractor: Multiplex
- Designations: Project Director Leigh Greenway; Deputy Project Director Phil Rowan

One Nine Elms is a mixed-use skyscraper in Nine Elms, London. It was originally developed by Wanda One, a UK subsidiary company of Dalian Wanda, until they sold the project to R&F Properties, another Chinese firm in 2018. It was designed by architects Kohn Pedersen Fox (KPF). The development replaces two towers on the site built in the 1970s called Market Towers and forms part of a wider redevelopment of the Nine Elms area of London. The development consists of two towers: the 57-storey City Tower contains 334 homes, while the 42-storey River Tower contains a 203-room Park Hyatt luxury hotel and 103 luxury Park Hyatt-branded apartments. Upon completion in 2024, One Nine Elms became one of the tallest residential developments in London and the United Kingdom. R&F then sold the property to Cheung Chung-kiu, the chairman of C C Land.

== History ==
=== Original proposal ===
Original design

In 2008, property developer Green Property bought the One Nine Elms Lane site, which lies in Nine Elms just south of the River Thames within the London borough of Wandsworth, from Allied Irish Bank.

On 18 June 2012, Wandsworth Council granted planning permission to Green Property along with project managers CIT Group for a mixed-use scheme consisting of residential apartments, offices and shops to replace two 1970s buildings on the site known as the Market Towers. The approved proposals included two skyscrapers of 200 m (656 ft) and 161 m (528 ft).

=== Sale and design development ===
In June 2013, Green Property sold the One Nine Elms site to Chinese developer Dalian Wanda. The scheme, which was Dalian Wanda's first development outside of China, was originally overseen by Wanda One - a UK subsidiary of Dalian Wanda.

In April 2014, Wandsworth Council approved revisions for the scheme subject to support from the then London Mayor Boris Johnson. In May 2014, Johnson gave permission for the revised proposals to go ahead despite criticism of the removal of office space from the scheme in order to accommodate a larger hotel which will be Dalian Wanda's first luxury hotel outside of China. A total of 436 residential apartments will also be built. Additionally, the design for One Nine Elms was revised which included the scrapping of a skybridge linking the two towers.

The larger of the two skyscrapers is known as City Tower and has a height of 199.4 m (654 ft), containing 58 floors. The smaller building, which is known as River Tower and contains the hotel, is 160.1 m (525 ft) tall with 42 floors.

In July 2016, Wanda One arranged financing for the development. As part of the scheme, Dalian Wanda were required to pay £20m to contribute to the London Underground extension of the Northern line and for affordable housing which was built in another location.

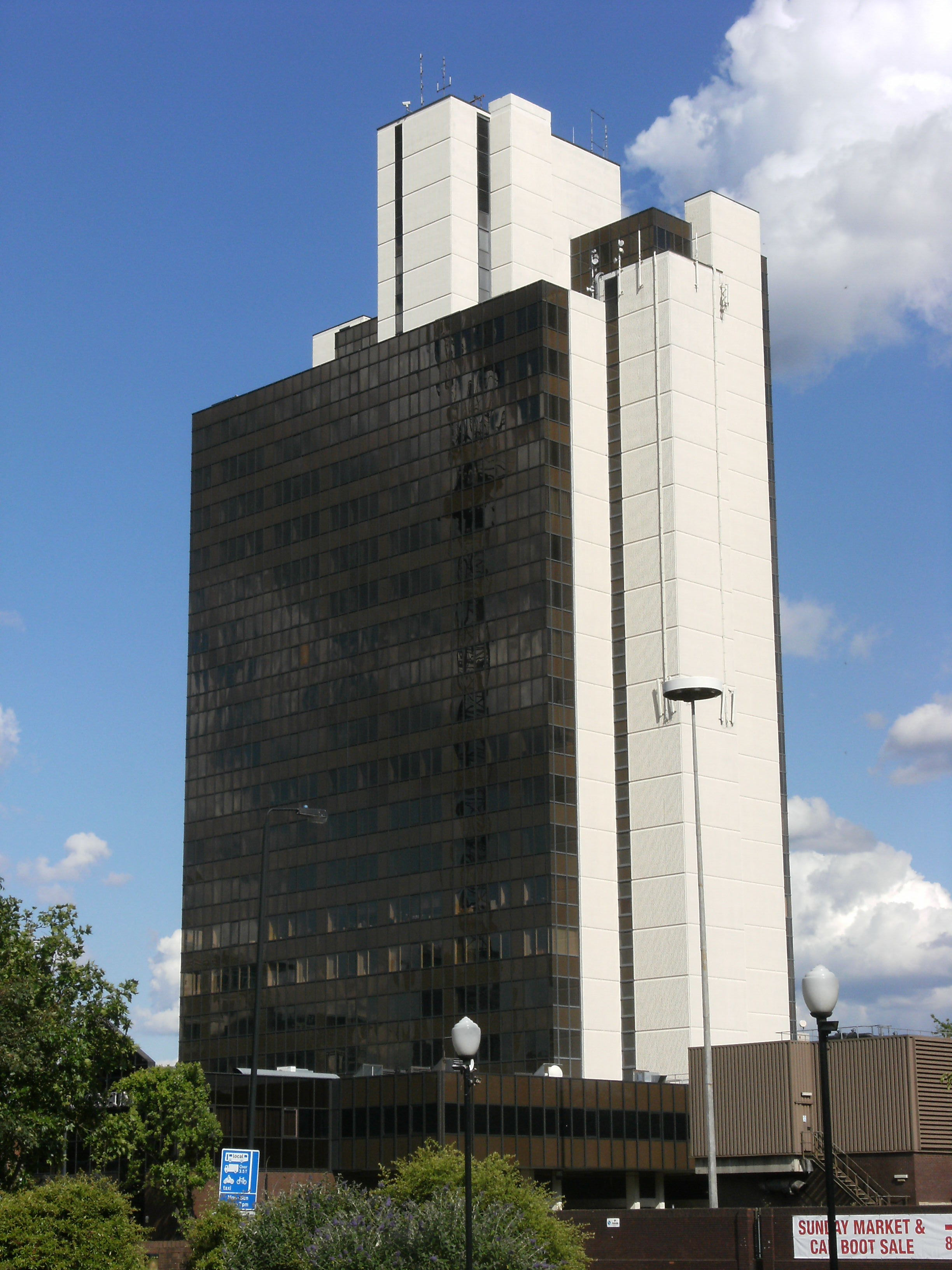
Market Towers, which previously occupied the site

=== Wider regeneration ===
The construction of One Nine Elms is part of a wider redevelopment of the Nine Elms area of London which will include 16,000 new homes as well as the relocation of the U.S. Embassy in London from Grosvenor Square, Mayfair.

=== Construction ===
Demolition of the Market Towers began in May 2014 by McGee Group and was completed in April 2015. Foundation works are taking place following demolition.

In April 2015, it was announced that the developer had awarded the main contract for One Nine Elms to China's largest construction group China State Construction Engineering Corporation (CSCEC) as well as Interserve in a joint venture known as CI-ONE. However, that deal collapsed in April 2016, with Balfour Beatty becoming the new contractor, signing a pre-construction agreement with Wanda One in July 2016. However, that contract came to an end in November 2016 after the two companies failed to agree terms for a new main build contract. In January 2017, Multiplex was announced as the new main contractor for the development.

In January 2018, Wanda sold their interest in the project to R&F Properties, another Chinese firm, for £59 million.

In November 2020, it was announced that the complex's luxury hotel, originally to be branded as a Wanda Vista Hotel, would instead be branded as a Park Hyatt.

Construction of One Nine Elms was expected to be completed in 2022. Progress slowed by February 2022 as R&F Properties was reported to have stopped paying the main contractor Multiplex. In June 2022, the company secured £772m of additional funding, and a new completion target date of late 2023 was set. The Park Hyatt London River Thames hotel is set to open in mid-2024.

The building reached "practical completion" in June 2024.

== Location ==
The building is located on 1 Nine Elms Lane, in the London borough of Wandsworth. The nearest station is Vauxhall.

== See also ==
- List of tallest buildings and structures in London
- List of tallest buildings in the United Kingdom
