= Randolph Stewart, 11th Earl of Galloway =

Scottish cricketer & British Army officer (1836–1920)

Randolph Henry Stewart
- Born: 14 October 1836; Sorbie, Wigtownshire, Scotland
- Died: 7 February 1920 (aged 83); Minnigaff, Kirkcudbrightshire, Scotland
- Education: Harrow School
- Spouse: Amy Mary Pauline Cliffe (m. 1891)
- Children: 2
- Parents: Randolph Stewart, 9th Earl of Galloway (father); Lady Harriett Blanche Somerset (mother)
- Relatives: Lord Garlies (brother); Alexander Stewart (nephew); James Stewart (nephew)
- Cricket career

Cricket information

Career statistics
Competition	First-class
Matches	2
Runs scored	7
Batting average	3.33
100s/50s	0/0
Top score	7
Catches/stumpings	6/–
- Source: Cricinfo, 18 August 2019
- Military career
- Allegiance: United Kingdom
- Branch: British Army
- Service years: 1855-1864
- Rank: Captain
- Unit: 42nd Highlanders
- Conflicts: Crimean War; Siege and Fall of Sevastopol; Indian Mutiny; Siege of Lucknow

Randolph Henry Stewart, 11th Earl of Galloway (14 October 1836 – 7 February 1920) was a Scottish first-class cricketer and British Army officer.

== Early life ==
The son of Randolph Stewart, 9th Earl of Galloway and his wife, Lady Harriett Blanche Somerset, he was born at Galloway House in October 1836.

He was educated at Harrow School. He played first-class cricket for the Gentlemen of England in 1856, making two appearances against the Gentlemen of Surrey and Sussex at Lord's and the Gentlemen of Kent and Sussex at Canterbury.

== Career ==
After leaving Harrow, Stewart enlisted in the British Army as an ensign in the 42nd Highlanders in March 1855, with promotion to the rank of lieutenant coming without purchase in August 1855. Stewart saw action during the latter stages of the Crimean War and was present at the Siege and Fall of Sevastopol, with the Ottoman Empire decorating him with the Turkish Crimea Medal.

He served in the Indian Mutiny and was present at the Siege of Lucknow in 1857. Following the suppression of the mutiny, Stewart continued to serve in British Indian in the capacity of a brigade-major in Ferozepore in 1859, and a deputy assistant quartermaster-general in Allahabad in 1860. He was promoted to the rank of captain by purchase in June 1864. He later served as a justice of the peace.

== Personal life ==
In June 1891, Stewart married Amy Mary Pauline Cliffe, daughter of Anthony Cliffe of Bellevue, County Wexford, Ireland and Amy Howley, with the couple having two children. He succeeded his elder brother Alan Stewart, who also played first-class cricket, as the 11th Earl of Galloway on 7 February 1901.

His son, The Hon. (Lt.) Keith A. Stewart served in. the Black Watch and was killed during the First World War, at Neuve Chapelle on 9 May 1915, aged 20, and is buried in Cabaret Rouge British Cemetery, jus south of Souchez.

Lord Galloway died at Cumlowden House at Minnigaff in Kirkcudbrightshire in February 1920, at which point he was succeeded as the 12th Earl of Galloway by his son, Randolph. His nephews, Alexander Stewart and James Stewart, both played first-class cricket.

Peerage of Scotland
Preceded by Alan Stewart	Earl of Galloway; 1901–1920	Succeeded by Randolph Stewart
