= Keith Stewart (disambiguation) =

Keith Stewart (1739–1795) was a Scottish Admiral and politician.

Keith Stewart may also refer to:

- Keith Stewart (Royal Navy officer) (1814–1879), Royal Naval Admiral
- Keith Lindsay Stewart (1896–1972), British Army Major-General
- Keith Stewart, Baron Stewart of Dirleton (born 1965), British Lawyer
