= Vauxhall Square =

Approved skyscraper group in London

General information
- Type: Residential
- Location: Vauxhall, London, England
- Coordinates: 51.483689°N 0.125944°W

Height
- Roof: 230.5 m (756 ft)

Technical details
- Floor count: 69

Vauxhall Square is an approved skyscraper group in Vauxhall, London. The group will form the centre and peak of the emerging Vauxhall skyscraper cluster, and is part of the wider Vauxhall, Nine Elms, Battersea redevelopment area. With the tallest tower reaching a height of 230.5 m (756 ft), it is expected to be the second tallest residential building in the United Kingdom at completion behind the Landmark Pinnacle in Canary Wharf.

== Background ==
The first plans to redevelop the site were designs by Allies & Morrison under CLS Holdings consisting of two residential skyscrapers with lowrise development between. Planning permission was granted in 2012, and again for modified plans in 2016, however several changes in ownership meant the plans were never implemented.

Cedarstone Capital acquired the site in 2024, commissioning architectural firm Pilbrow & Partners to provide new designs. They produced new plans by 2025, with involvement from developers Bmor, and Cheyne Capital. Planning permission was granted, facing opposition from Historic England, in a narrow vote in September 2026.

== Design ==
The site covers a 3.8 acre plot at the centre of the emerging Vauxhall skyscraper cluster, sitting nearby to Vauxhall Station and Vauxhall Bus Station. The plans include four tall towers, the tallest 230.5 m (756 ft) and 69 storeys in height, two others of 61 storeys and one at 45. The development will provide room for offices, student accommodation, a hotel and commercial spaces at ground level.

== See also ==
- Thames City
- One Nine Elms
- List of tallest buildings and structures in London
