= 2–8a Rutland Gate =

House in Knightsbridge, London, England

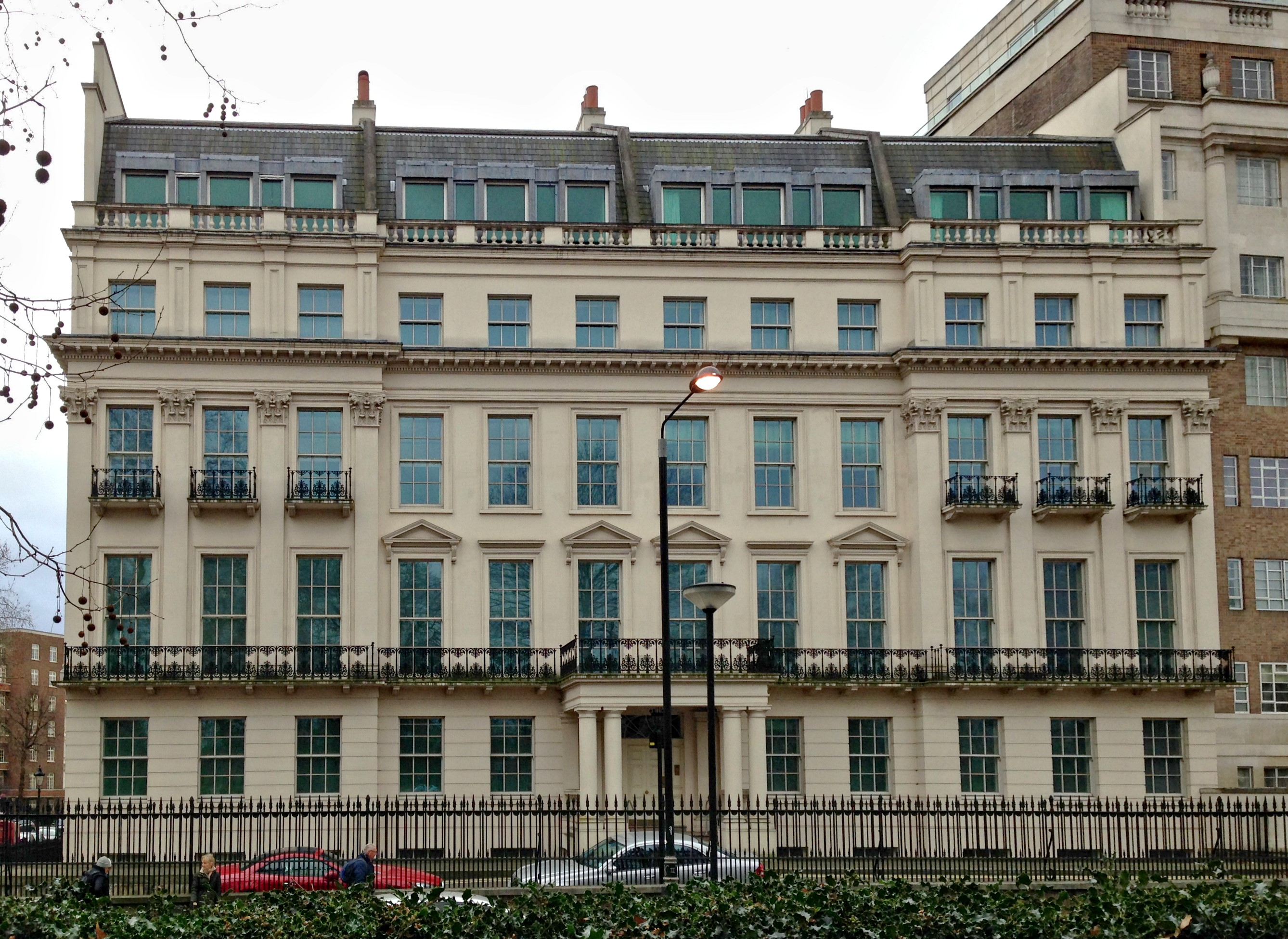
- 2–8a Rutland Gate from Hyde Park in 2016
- Interactive map of the 2–8a Rutland Gate area

General information
- Location: 2–8a Rutland Gate, SW7 Knightsbridge, London, United Kingdom
- Coordinates: 51°30′06″N 00°10′07″W
- Construction started: 1985
- Completed: 1987
- Owner: 2-8 Rutland Gate Limited - Mohannad Al Marar

Technical details
- Floor count: 7
- Floor area: 60,000 square feet (5,600 m^{2})

Design and construction
- Architecture firm: YRM

2–8a Rutland Gate is a large terraced house on Rutland Gate in the Knightsbridge district of London, overlooking Hyde Park. It was formerly four houses and built as 2 Rutland Gate and 4–8a Rutland Gate, but the houses were converted into a single property during the mid-1980s. It is considered the most expensive house in the United Kingdom, having sold for £210 million in 2020. However, it has stood empty since 2015.

== Description ==
2–8a Rutland Gate is a large white stuccoed house originally built as a terrace of four houses in the mid-19th century. The four houses were later converted into a single property. A competition to redesign the house was held in 1982 and won by the architectural firm YRM. The present 2–8a Rutland Gate was built between 1985 and 1987, replacing 2 Rutland Gate and 4–8a Rutland Gate, a group of 1930s houses. The Survey of London describes the design of the present 2–8a Rutland Gate as "One of YRM's least Modern designs ... the building comprises a rather bland white palazzo."

In 2012, the house was described as having seven storeys and 45 bedrooms, with a total size of 60,000 square feet (5,600 m^{2}). The interior of 2–8a Rutland Gate has a swimming pool, underground parking, several lifts, and substantial interior decoration of gold leaf. The interior of the house was described as having been decorated by Monzer Hammoud by The Guardian and by the French designer Alberto Pinto by the Evening Standard in July 2015. The windows of the house are believed to be bulletproof.

2–8a Rutland Gate has been likened to two other palatial London houses, Bridgewater House in St James's, and Dudley House in Mayfair.

== History ==
Since 1982, 2–8a Rutland Gate has been owned by Yunak Corporation, registered in the Dutch Antilles tax haven of Curaçao. The house was the London residence of the former Prime Minister of Lebanon and billionaire businessman Rafic Hariri, until his assassination in 2005. Following Hariri's death, the house was given as a gift to the then–Crown Prince of Saudi Arabia, Sultan bin Abdulaziz Al Saud (1928–2011), who had had business links with Hariri. In 2012, 2–8a Rutland Gate was reported to be for sale at an asking price of £300 million, which would have made it the most expensive house in Britain if realized, surpassing the £140 million paid for Park Place in Berkshire by the Russian banker Andrey Borodin.

The house remained unsold and was later valued at £140 million in early 2015. In June 2015, the contents of the property were put up for auction in a 1,252 lot sale lasting two days. Items for sale included Murano glass chandeliers, gold plated wastepaper bins, and 24 marble bathrooms.

A loan of £55 million to fund the cost of stripping out the property was secured against the house in December 2014, issued by Omni Capital Partners, a financial services company owned by the property developers Christian and Nick Candy. After 2–8a Rutland Gate had not sold by July 2015, the Saudi owners of the property were planning to turn the house into luxury apartments.

In April 2020, Chinese businessman Cheung Chung-kiu bought the property for £210 million, which would make it easily the most expensive house ever sold in the UK.

In October 2022 it was reported that Hui Ka Yan, founder and chair of Evergrande and once China's richest man, was ultimately behind the purchase, and that it had been put up for sale again. Later changes to transparency laws required the ultimate beneficiary to be identified, the name was that of Hui's wife, Canadian Ding Yumei, since divorced.

After Evergrande collapsed in 2024, the house could not be seized by liquidators as it was in the name of Ding; but she could not sell as her assets had been frozen, leaving the future of the house in limbo.

As of 2026 the house has been vacant since around 2015. From 2023 Swedish man Anders Fernstedt, otherwise homeless, has lived outside in the front porch. He had worked as a freelance fact checker for The Economist, and is well known in the area as the "Swan Whisperer". He maintains a large collection of potted plants in front of the building.
