= Charlotte Sophia Somerset, Duchess of Beaufort =

Wife of Henry Somerset, 6th Duke of Beaufort

Her Grace The Duchess of Beaufort
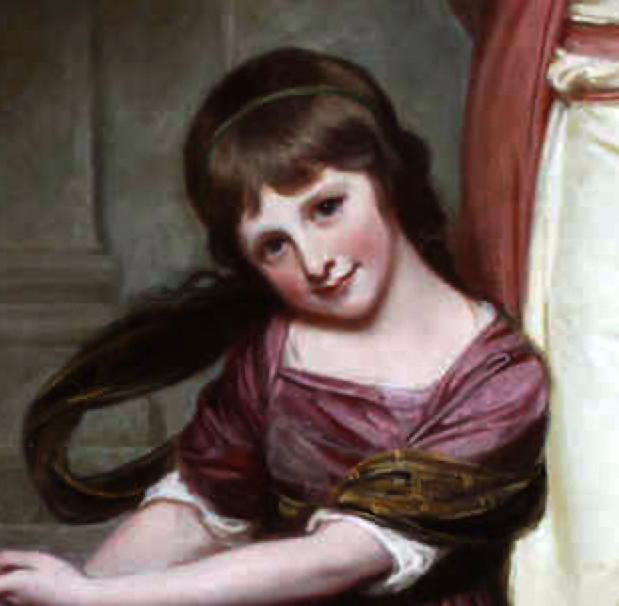
- from a group portrait of the Gower family by George Romney
- Born: 11 January 1771
- Died: 12 August 1854 (aged 83)
- Spouse: Henry Somerset, 6th Duke of Beaufort 16 May 1791 (m. 1835, died)
- Issue: 12, including: Henry Somerset; Lord Granville Somerset; Harriet Stewart
- Father: Granville Leveson-Gower, 1st Marquess of Stafford
- Mother: Lady Susanna Stewart

Charlotte Sophia Somerset, Duchess of Beaufort (11 January 1771 – 12 August 1854), formerly Lady Charlotte Sophia Leveson-Gower, was the wife of Henry Somerset, 6th Duke of Beaufort.

== Early life ==
She was the daughter of Granville Leveson-Gower, 1st Marquess of Stafford, and his wife, the former Lady Susanna Stewart.

== Personal life ==
She married the future duke, then Marquess of Worcester, on 16 May 1791 at Lambeth Church, London. They had four sons and eight daughters:

- Henry Somerset, 7th Duke of Beaufort (1792–1853)
- Lord Granville Charles Henry Somerset (1792–1848), who married Hon. Emily Smith and had children
- Lord William George Henry Somerset (1793-1794)
- Lady Charlotte Sophia Somerset (1795–1865), who married Frederick Gough, 4th Baron Calthorpe, and had children.
- Lady Elizabeth Susan Somerset (1798-1876), who married twice (first, Captain Lord Edward O'Brien; second, Maj-Gen. James Orde), and had children.
- Lady Georgiana Augusta Somerset (1800-1865), who married Granville Dudley Ryder and had children.
- Lord Edward Henry Somerset (1802-1803)
- Lady Susan Carolina Somerset (1804-1886), who married George Cholmondeley, 2nd Marquess of Cholmondeley, and had no children
- Lady Louisa Elizabeth Somerset (1806-1892), who married George Finch, and had children
- Lady Isabella Somerset (1808-1831), who married Colonel Thomas Henry Kingscote and had children
- Lady Harriett Blanche Somerset (1811-1885), who married Randolph Stewart, 9th Earl of Galloway, and had children
- Lady Mary Octavia Somerset (1814-1906), who married Sir Walter Farquhar, 3rd Baronet, and had children.

In 1803, her husband succeeded his father as Duke of Beaufort, and she rose from marchioness to duchess. Her portrait was painted by Sir Francis Grant. The duke died in 1835 and was buried in St Michael and All Angels Church, Badminton. The dowager duchess then lived with her youngest daughter at her London home in Grosvenor Square. She died in 1854, aged 83, at Westbrook Hall, Hertfordshire.

=== Legacy ===
She was included in the "Gallery of Beauties" series commissioned by Prince Regent (later King) George IV.
