= Tianjin R&F Guangdong Tower =

Under-construction Skyscraper in Tianjin, China

Coordinates: 39°00′02″N 117°40′01″E

- 天津富力广东大厦
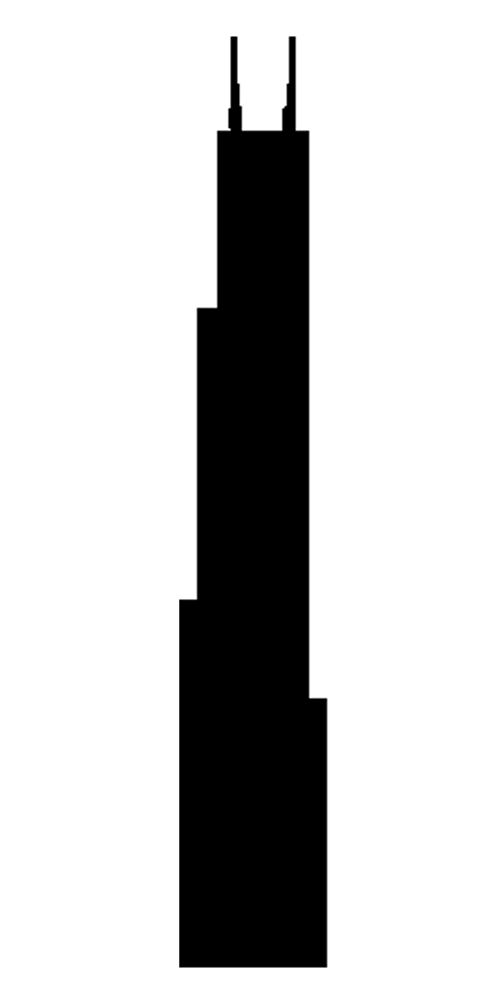
- A design of R&F Guangdong Building
- Interactive map of the Tianjin R&F Guangdong Tower area

General information
- Status: Under construction
- Location: Tianjin, China
- Construction started: 2011
- Estimated completion: 2027
- Client: R&F Properties

Height
- Architectural: 468 m (1,535 ft)
- Roof: 384 m (1,260 ft)

Technical details
- Floor count: 91 (4 below ground)
- Floor area: 419,860 m^{2}

Design and construction
- Architect: Goettsch Partners
- Engineer: Arup

Tianjin R&F Guangdong Tower
- Simplified Chinese: 天津富力广东大厦
- Traditional Chinese: 天津富力廣東大廈
Transcriptions
Standard Mandarin
- Hanyu Pinyin: Tiānjīn Fù Lì Guǎngdōng Dàshà

Tianjin R&F Guangdong Tower is a 91-storey, 468 m (1,535 ft) tall mixed use supertall skyscraper on hold in Tanggu District, Tianjin, China. The tower was proposed for construction in 2008. Since then, construction progress has substantially slowed and later halted. If completed it will become the third tallest building in Tianjin and one of the tallest buildings in the world.

== See also ==
- List of tallest buildings in China
- List of tallest buildings in the world
