= Alexander Stewart (cricketer) =

English cricketer

Personal information
- Born: 2 June 1858; Port of Spain, Spanish West Indies (present-day Trinidad and Tobago)
- Died: 17 February 1904 (aged 45); Marylebone, London, England

Domestic team information
- Years: Team
- Middlesex County Cricket Club
- Oxford University

Alexander Lamont Stewart (2 June 1858 – 17 February 1904) was an English first-class cricketer.

Stewart was educated at Clifton College. active 1880–84 who played for Middlesex and Oxford University. He was born in Port of Spain, educated at Clifton College and St Edmund Hall, Oxford, and died in Marylebone.
