= James P. Stewart =

US Coast Guard vice admiral (1924–2019)

- Born: July 1, 1924; Covington, Kentucky, United States
- Died: January 9, 2019 (aged 94) Kirkland, Washington, United States
- Allegiance: United States of America
- Branch: United States Coast Guard
- Service years: 1946–1980s
- Rank: Vice admiral
- Awards: Coast Guard Distinguished Service Medal, Legion of Merit

James Paul Stewart (July 1, 1924 – January 9, 2019) was a United States Coast Guard vice admiral. He served as Commander of the Coast Guard Pacific Area and Third Coast Guard District.
