= Randolph Stewart, 9th Earl of Galloway =

Scottish peer & politician (1800–1873)

The Right Honourable The Earl of Galloway

Lord Lieutenant of Wigtown
- In office 1828–1851
- Preceded by: The Earl of Galloway
- Succeeded by: The Earl of Stair

Lord Lieutenant of Kirkcudbright
- In office 1828–1845
- Preceded by: The Earl of Galloway
- Succeeded by: The Earl of Selkirk

Member of Parliament for Cockermouth
- In office 1826–1831
- Preceded by: Sir John Lowther
- Succeeded by: Sir John Lowther

Personal details
- Born: Randolph Algernon Ronald Stewart; 16 September 1800
- Died: 2 January 1873 (aged 72)
- Party: Tory
- Spouse: Lady Harriet Blanche Somerset (m. 1833)
- Relations: Lady Jane Stewart (sister)
- Children: 13
- Parents: George Stewart, 8th Earl of Galloway (father); Lady Jane Paget (mother)
- Education: Harrow School
- Alma mater: Christ Church, Oxford

Randolph Algernon Ronald Stewart, 9th Earl of Galloway (16 September 1800 – 2 January 1873) was the Lord Lieutenant of Kirkcudbright from 1828 to 1845; and of Wigton from 1828 to 1851. He was styled Viscount Garlies from 1806 to 1834.

== Early life ==
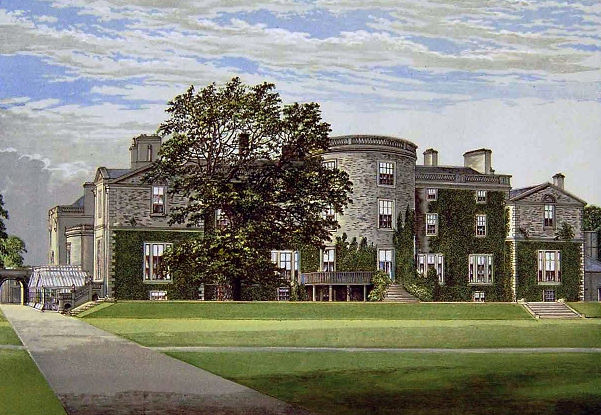
Galloway House c.1800

He was born on 16 September 1800. He was the eldest son of eight children born to George Stewart, 8th Earl of Galloway and his wife Lady Jane Paget. Among his siblings was sisters, Lady Jane Stewart, who married George Spencer-Churchill, 6th Duke of Marlborough, and Lady Louisa Stewart, who married William Duncombe, 2nd Baron Feversham. His younger brother, Vice Admiral Hon. Keith Stewart, was married to Mary FitzRoy, daughter of Charles Augustus FitzRoy.

His paternal grandparents were John Stewart, 7th Earl of Galloway, and Anne, daughter of Sir James Dashwood, 2nd Baronet. His maternal grandfather was Henry Paget, 1st Earl of Uxbridge, and his uncle was Henry Paget, 1st Marquess of Anglesey.

He was educated at Harrow and Christ Church, Oxford. He was painted by English portrait and historical painter Frederick Yeates Hurlstone.

== Career ==
He was Tory MP for Cockermouth from 1826 to 1831. He succeeded and was duly succeeded, by Sir John Lowther, 2nd Baronet, of Swillington. He served alongside William Carus Wilson (from 1821 to 1826), Laurence Peel (from 1827 to 1830), and Philip Pleydell-Bouverie (from 1830 to 1831).

Upon his father's death on 27 March 1834, Stewart succeeded to the titles of Earl of Galloway, Lord Garlies, Baron Stewart of Garlies, Baronet or Corsewell, and Baronet of Burray. He also inherited the family seat of Galloway House in Dumfries and Galloway. During his ownership, considerable work was done on Galloway House, including the hiring of William Burn in 1841 to carry out alterations, including an additional floor in parts of the building.

== Personal life ==
On 9 August 1833, he married Lady Harriet Blanche Somerset, daughter of Henry Somerset, 6th Duke of Beaufort, and had 6 sons and 7 daughters, including:

- Lady Helen Blanche Stewart (1834–1903), who married Walter Clifford Mellor, in 1896.
- Alan Stewart, 10th Earl of Galloway (1835–1901), who married Lady Arabella Arthur, daughter of James Gascoyne-Cecil, 2nd Marquess of Salisbury, in 1872.
- Randolph Stewart, 11th Earl of Galloway (1836–1920), who married Amy Mary Pauline Cliffe, daughter of Anthony John Cliffe, in 1891.
- Maj. Gen. Hon. Alexander Stewart DL (1838–1896), who married Adela Maria Loder, daughter of Sir Robert Loder, 1st Baronet, in 1883.
- Lady Emma Georgiana Stewart (1840–1869), who married Wilbraham Tollemache, 2nd Baron Tollemache, in 1856.
- Lady Mary Louise Stewart (1842–1929), who married Charles Edward Stephen Cooke, son of Sir William Cooke, 8th Baronet, in 1874.
- Lady Jane Charlotte Stewart (1846–1897), who married Henry Anthony Spedding, in 1881.
- Lady Emily Octavia Stewart (1847–1929), who married Capt. Hon. Francis Chichester, son of Arthur Chichester, 1st Baron Templemore, in 1875.
- Col. Hon. Walter John Stewart (b. 1849)
- Lady Henrietta Caroline Stewart (1850–1930), who married Algernon Turnor, in 1880.
- Lady Isabel Maud Stewart (1852–1927), who died unmarried.
- Hon. Malcolm Stewart (1853–1853), who died in infancy.
- Hon. FitzRoy Somerset Keith Stewart (1855–1914), who married Elizabeth Louisa (née Rogers) Thompson (widow of John Stanley Thompson), daughter of Rev. Robert Green Rogers, in 1888.

The Earl of Galloway died on 2 January 1873. He was succeeded in his titles and estates in turn by his eldest son Alan, and his second son Randolph. His widow, the dowager countess, died in 1885 at her home in Eaton Square, London, aged 74.

=== Legacy ===
In 1875, a memorial was erected to the 9th Earl of Galloway in Newton Stewart in Scotland.

Parliament of the United Kingdom
Preceded by Sir John Lowther, 2nd Baronet, of Swillington	Member of Parliament for Cockermouth; 1826–1831; With: William Carus Wilson 1821–1826; Laurence Peel 1827–1830; Philip Pleydell-Bouverie 1830–1831	Succeeded by Sir John Lowther, 2nd Baronet, of Swillington
Honorary titles
Preceded by The Earl of Galloway	Lord Lieutenant of Kirkcudbright; 1828–1845	Succeeded by The Earl of Selkirk
Preceded by The Earl of Galloway	Lord Lieutenant of Wigtown; 1828–1851	Succeeded by The Earl of Stair
Peerage of Scotland
Preceded by George Stewart	Earl of Galloway; 1834–1873	Succeeded by Alan Plantagenet Stewart
