= Jane Stewart, Countess of Galloway =

British countess

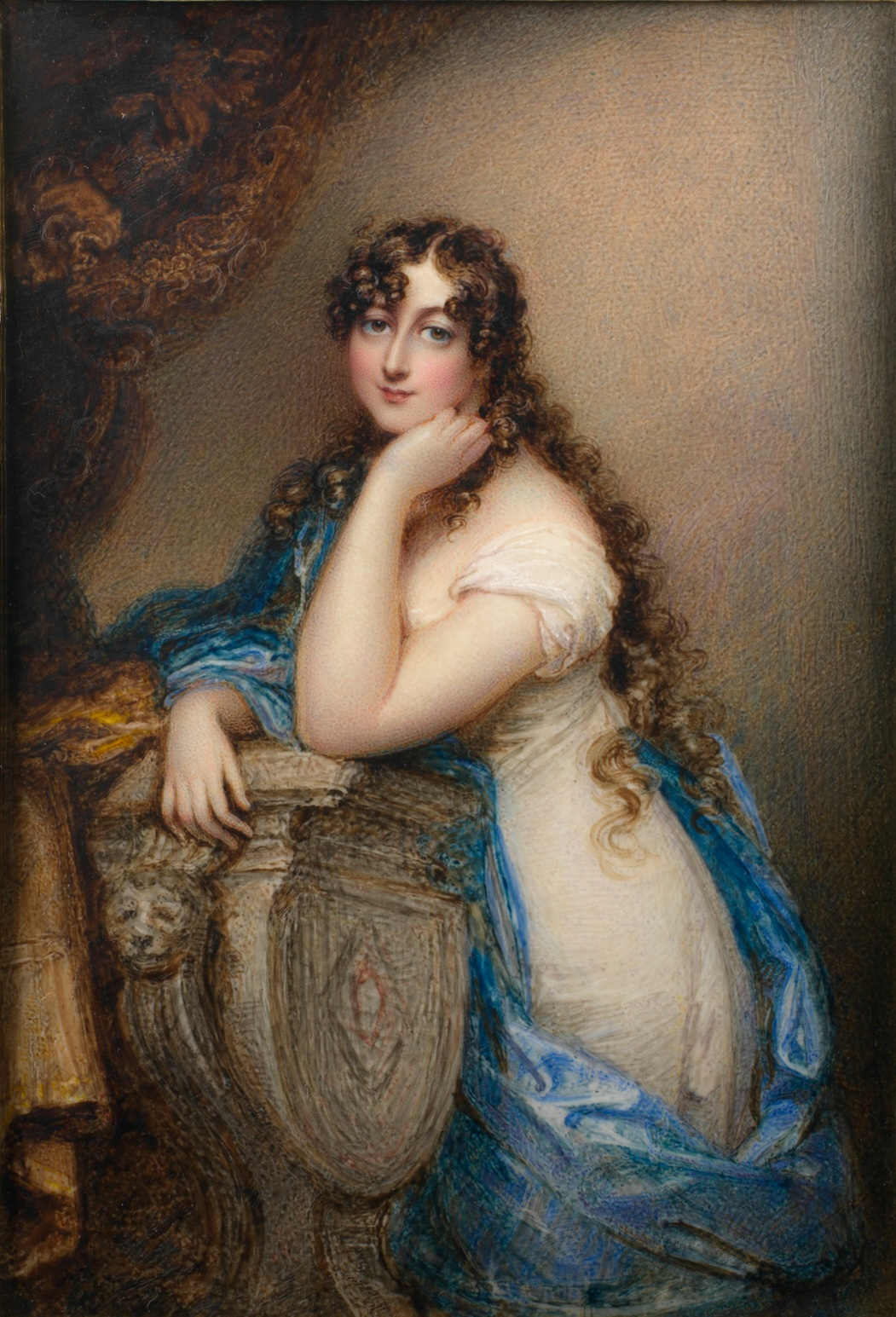
- Portrait by Anne Mee
- Born: 1 September 1774; Kensington, London
- Died: 30 June 1842 (aged 67); Rutland Gate, Westminster, England
- Spouse: George Stewart (m. 1797)
- Children: 8, including Randolph and Keith
- Father: Henry, Earl of Uxbridge
- Relatives: Henry, Marquess of Anglesey (brother)

Jane Stewart, Countess of Galloway (née Hon. Jane Bayly Paget; 1 September 1774 – 30 June 1842) was a British noblewoman and the wife of George Stewart, 8th Earl of Galloway.

== Biography ==
Lady Jane was the daughter of Henry Paget, 1st Earl of Uxbridge and his wife, Jane Champagné. Her mother was born in Ireland of French Huguenot descent, the daughter of Arthur Champagne, Dean of Clonmacnoise and Lady Jane Forbes (daughter of the Earl of Granard). Her uncles were Gen. Josiah Champagné, Lt. Gen Forbes Champagné, and Rev. George Champagné.

Her brother Henry was created Marquess of Anglesey.

She married Stewart on 18 April 1797.

They had eight children, three of whom died in infancy:

- Lady Jane Stewart (1798–1844), who married her first cousin, George Spencer-Churchill, 6th Duke of Marlborough, and had children
- Lady Caroline Stewart (1799–1857)
- Randolph Stewart, 9th Earl of Galloway (1800–1873)
- Lady Louisa Stewart (1804–1889), who married William Duncombe, 2nd Baron Feversham, and had children
- Hon Arthur Stewart (1805–1806)
- Hon Alan Stewart (1807–1808)
- Lady Helen Stewart (1810–1813)
- Vice Admiral Hon Keith Stewart (1814–1879), who married Mary FitzRoy, daughter of Charles Augustus FitzRoy, and had children

The earl died in 1834 and his wife became known as Dowager Countess of Galloway. She died at Rutland Gate, Hyde Park, London, aged 67.
