= Rutland Gate =

Street in Knightsbridge, London

Coordinates: 51.499519°N 0.168204°W

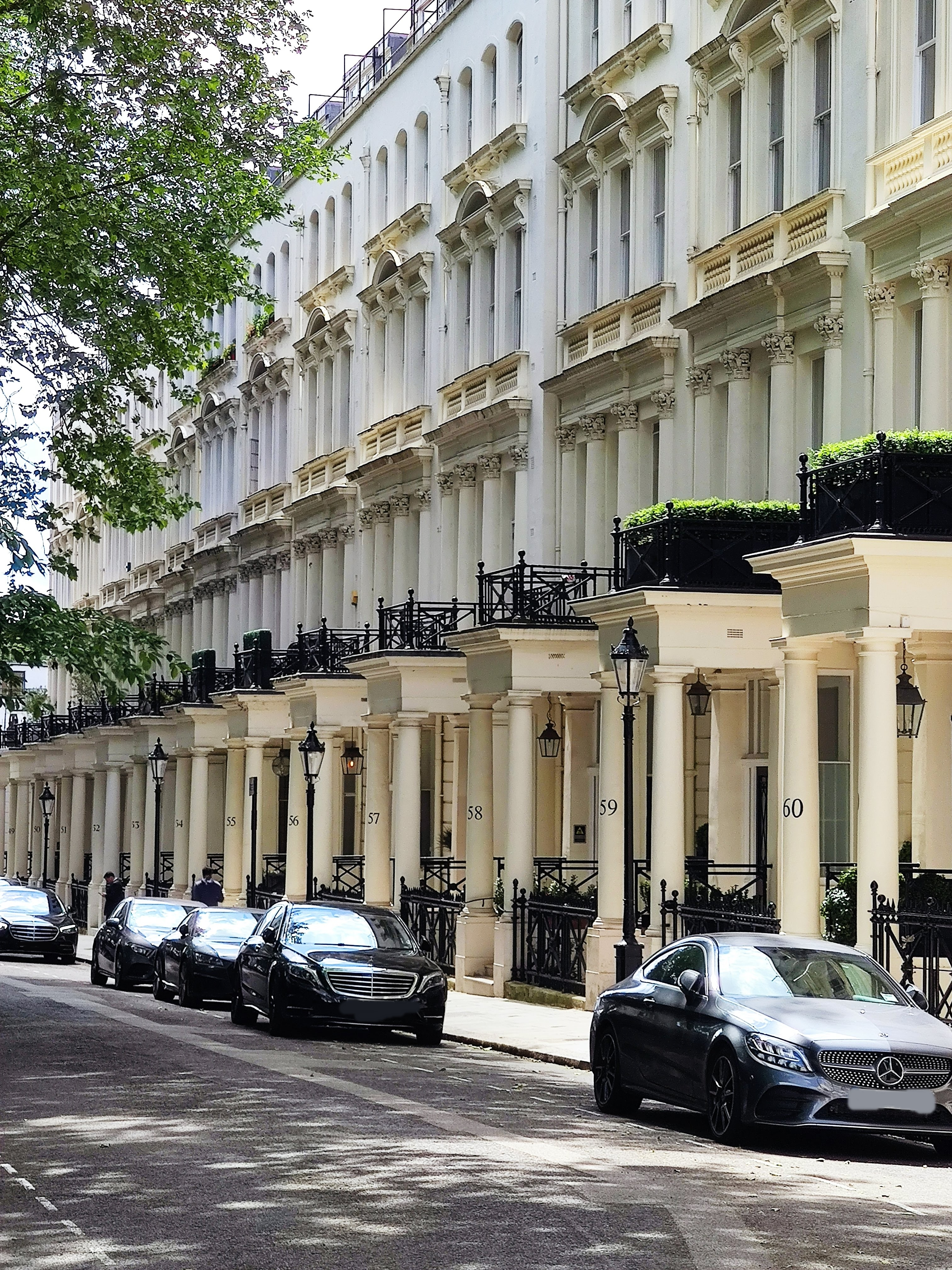
Houses in southern Rutland Gate

Rutland Gate is a street in Knightsbridge just south of Hyde Park consisting of a double garden-square "hourglass" site. It was built on the former land of Rutland House and includes a number of Grade listed buildings.

== History ==
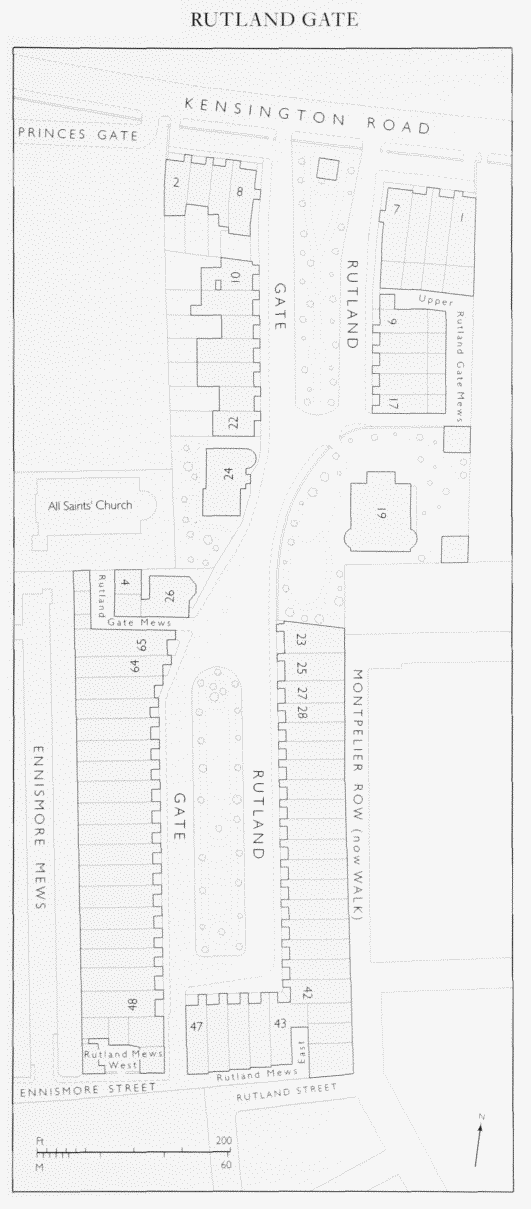
Map of Rutland Gate in the 1860s

Development of the Rutland House estate into the current street began in 1836 following demolition of the house. Architect Edward Cresy devised a symmetrical scheme of terraces which was later modified to allow for detached houses built for John Sheepshanks and William Jones. Building work was carried out by a number of builders into the 1840s.

From 1851, completion of the southern section was carried out by John Elger, who had previously worked on the development of the nearby Kingston House Estate and his works reflected a style more similar to the Victorian character of building seen there, with greater ornament than the restricted Georgian programme seen in the older buildings of Rutland Gate. By 1858, Welchman & Gale appear to have been carrying out much of the work, and Elger's continued role, despite explicit credit, is contentious.

Rutland Gate remained largely unchanged before the First World War, the interwar would see the beginning of modern redevelopment in Eresby House. Following the Second World War houses were largely subdivided into flats, and more modern blocks would be built including Rutland Gate House.

== Architecture ==
The northern end of the development, the terraces facing the park, consist of grand Italianate stuccoed facades inspired by the architecture of John Nash in his Regent's Park terraces. The houses inside the squares are generally plainer, particularly in the upper section, the lower section consisting of later more Victorian style developments have greater ornament. The detached houses towards the south of the street, some of which now demolished, displayed a more varied range of architecture.

== Notable Residents ==
Notable Residents of Rutland Gate include:

- Richard Meinerzhagen, naturalist and Intelligence officer; No. 3.
- Frederic Maugham, Lord Chancellor; No. 3.
- Edward Turner Boyd Twisleton, politician; No. 3.
- Archibald Hastie, politician; No. 5
- George Ward Hunt, Chancellor of the Exchequer; No. 5.
- George Wightwick Rendel, civil engineer; No. 8. (dem.)
- George Lyall, Governor of the Bank of England; No. 9.
- Sir John Bell, general; No. 10.
- Hugh de Grey, Marquess of Hertford, courtier; No. 10.
- Lord Noel-Buxton, politician; No. 12.
- Sir George Russell Clerk, civil servant; No. 13. (dem.)
- Sir Henry Charles Drummond Wolff, diplomat; No. 15. (dem.)
- Frederick Marrable, architect; No. 16.
- Lord Northcote, governor-general of the Australia; No. 17. (dem.)
- Sir John St George, general; No. 17. (dem.)
- Sir Eyre Massey Shaw, head of the London Metropolitan Fire Brigade; No. 18.
- Sir Thomas Bladen Capel, admiral; No. 22.
- Sir Henry Thurstan Holland, politician; No. 25.
- Arthur R. D. Elliot, journalist and politician; No. 27.
- Sir Edward Fanshawe, admiral; No. 27.
- Sir Herbert Lawrence, soldier and banker; No. 32.
- Sir Montague Edward Browning, admiral; No. 32.
- Sir Hew Dalrymple-Ross, field-marshal; No. 34.
- Dudley Clarke, brigadier; No. 35.
- Frank McClean, astronomer; No. 38.
- Frederick A. Maxse, admiral and political writer; No. 38 .
- Sir Edward McArthur, general; No. 38.
- Lord Carson, politician; No. 39.
- Sir Robert Donald, newspaper editor; No. 41.
- Sir Thomas Gardner Horridge, judge; No. 41.
- Sir Francis Galton, founder of eugenics; No. 42.
- Sir Archibald Alison, general; No. 43. (dem.)
- Sir John Edmund Commerell, admiral; No. 45.
- 3rd Earl of Morley, politician; No. 45.
- 7th Earl of Albemarle, politician; No. 48.
- Sir Frederick John Dealtry Lugard, colonial administrator; No. 51.
- Sir Robert Craigie, diplomat; No. 52.
- Sir James Bailey, politician; No. 58.
- Sir Austen Chamberlain, politician; No. 58.
- Sir Claude Henry Mason Buckle, admiral; No. 59.
- Henry Reeve, journalist; No. 62.
- Sir Cecil Harcourt-Smith, archaeologist; No. 62.
- Lord Calthorpe, agriculturist and philanthropist; No. 63.

== Notable buildings ==
- 2–8a Rutland Gate
- 24 Rutland Gate
- 26 Rutland Gate

== See Also ==
- Kingston House estate, London
- Kensington Road
