= Mary Arabella Stewart, Countess of Galloway =

English noblewoman

Arabella Stewart, Countess of Galloway (26 April 1850 – 18 August 1903), formerly Lady Mary Arabella Arthur Cecil, was the wife of Alan Stewart, 10th Earl of Galloway.

She was the daughter of James Brownlow William Gascoyne-Cecil, 2nd Marquess of Salisbury, and his second wife, the former Lady Mary Catherine Sackville-West. Her older half-brother, Robert Arthur Talbot Gascoyne-Cecil, 3rd Marquess of Salisbury, was prime minister of the United Kingdom from 1886 to 1892 and again from 1895 to 1902.

She married the future earl on 25 January 1872, a year before he succeeded to his father's titles. As Lord Garlies, he was Conservative MP for Wigtownshire, thus representing the same party as his brother-in-law.

There were no children from their marriage. The earl died in 1901, aged 65, and was succeeded in the earldom by his brother Randolph Henry Stewart, 11th Earl of Galloway. A portrait photograph of the countess, taken during the 1870s by John Watkins, is held by London's National Gallery.

The dowager countess had a London house at 17 Upper Grosvenor Street, but died at "Cuffnells", Lyndhurst, Hampshire, of pneumonia, aged 53.

== Ancestry ==
Ancestors of Mary Arabella Stewart, Countess of Galloway

16. James Cecil, 5th Earl of Salisbury
8. James Cecil, 6th Earl of Salisbury
17. Lady Anne Tufton
4. James Cecil, 1st Marquess of Salisbury
18. Edward Keet of Canterbury
9. Elizabeth Keet
19. Mary Hunt
2. James Gascoyne-Cecil, 2nd Marquess of Salisbury
20. Trevor Hill, 1st Viscount Hillsborough
10. Wills Hill, 1st Marquess of Downshire
21. Mary Rowe
5. Lady Emily Mary Hill
22. Robert FitzGerald, 19th Earl of Kildare
11. Lady Margaretta FitzGerald
23. Lady Mary O'Brien
1. Lady Mary Arabella Arthur Cecil
24. Lieutenant-General John West, 2nd Earl De La Warr
12. John West, 4th Earl De La Warr
25. Mary Wynyard
6. George Sackville-West, 5th Earl De La Warr
26. Henry Lyell of Bourn
13. Catherina Lyell
27. Catharine Allestrie
3. Lady Mary Catherine Sackville-West
28. Lord John Sackville
14. John Sackville, 3rd Duke of Dorset
29. Lady Frances Leveson-Gower
7. Lady Elizabeth Sackville
30. Sir Charles Cope, 2nd Baronet
15. Arabella Diana Cope
31. Catherine Bishopp
