= James Stewart (English cricketer) =

English cricketer

Personal information
- Born: 2 June 1858; Glasgow, Scotland
- Died: 20 July 1943 (aged 85); Whitchurch, Devon, England

Domestic team information
- Years: Team
- 1877-1880: Middlesex County Cricket Club

James Marshall Stewart (9 August 1861 – 20 July 1943) was an English first-class cricketer active 1877–80 who played for Middlesex. He was born in Glasgow; died in Whitchurch.
