= William Houston Stewart =

Royal Navy Admiral (1822–1902)

Admiral Sir William Houston Stewart GCB
- Born: 7 September 1822; Kirkmichael House, Ayrshire
- Died: 13 November 1902 (aged 80); London
- Military career
- Allegiance: United Kingdom
- Branch: Royal Navy
- Service years: 1835–1885
- Rank: Admiral
- Commands: Firebrand; Dragon; Impregnable; Marlborough; Plymouth Command
- Conflicts: Crimean War
- Awards: Knight Grand Cross of the Order of the Bath

Admiral Sir William Houston Stewart, GCB (7 September 1822 – 13 November 1901) was a senior British naval officer who, after a long, active career, eventually held the office of the Controller of the Royal Navy from 1872 to 1881.

== Personal life ==
William Houston Stewart was born on 7 September 1822 at Kirkmichael House, Ayrshire. He was the son of Admiral of the Fleet Sir Houston Stewart, and Martha, youngest daughter of Sir William Miller.

On 20 February 1850, he married Catherine Elizabeth Coote, only daughter of Eyre Coote of West Park, Hampshire. Catherine died on 23 November 1867.

His remarried on 11 January 1872, this time to Blanche Caroline, the third child of Admiral Hon. Keith Stewart, and Mary Caroline Stewart (née Fitzroy). They had one daughter.

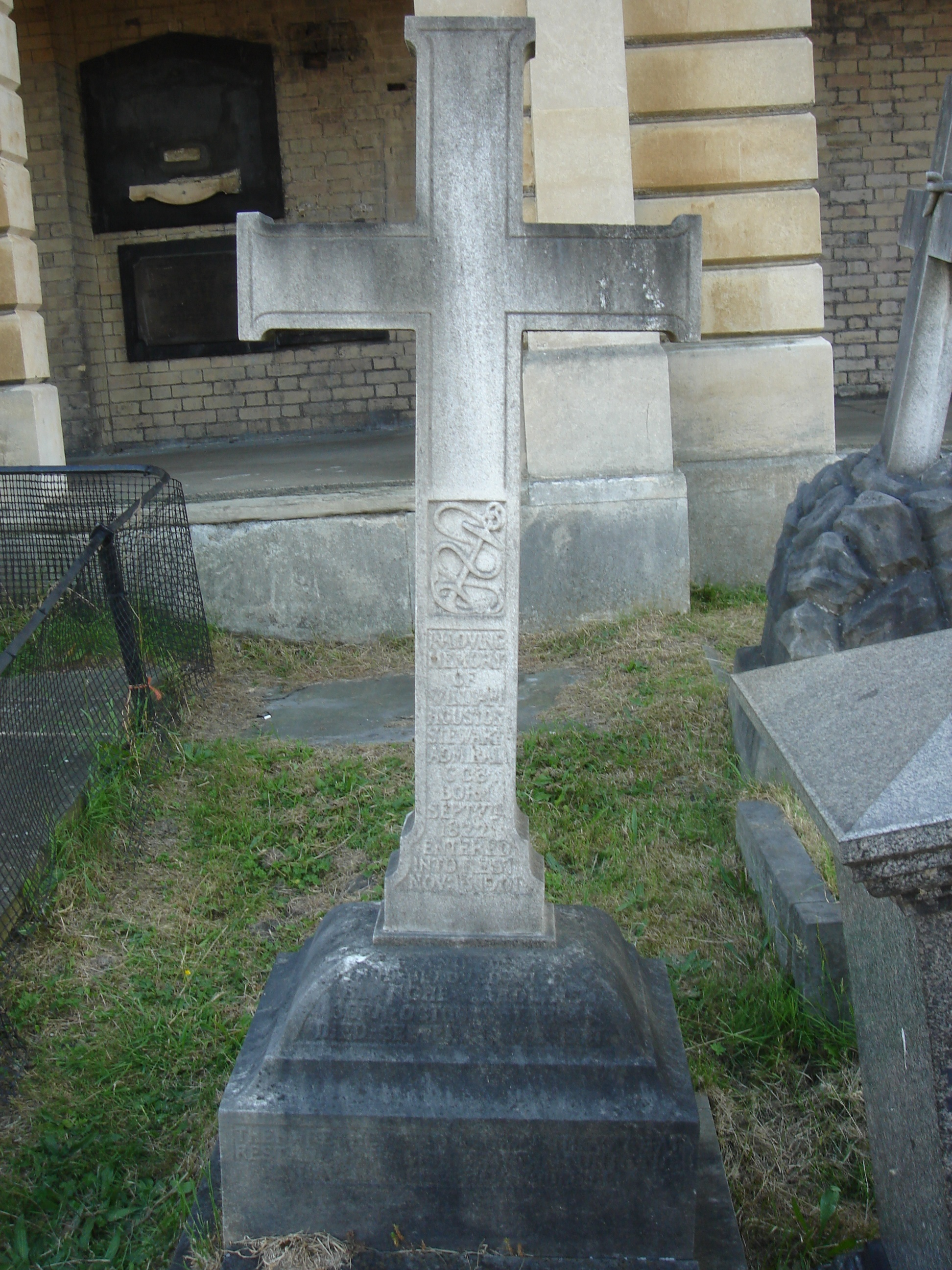
Funerary monument, Brompton Cemetery, London

== Early career ==
Stewart entered the Navy on 29 April 1835. His first active service was aboard the Tweed during the Carlist Wars in Spain 1836–37, and then during the Syrian campaign 1840–41, in HMS Carysfort, during which time he was wounded and mentioned in dispatches. He served as lieutenant on 28-gun frigate Volage from 29 June 1843 until March 1843, though officially he was not promoted to Lieutenant until 26 September 1842. Volage was commanded by Captain William Dickson, and was on the North America and West Indies station. In March 1843 he was appointed lieutenant in the 74-gun two-decker Illustrious, commanded by Captain John Elphinstone Erskine, flagship of Vice-Admiral Charles Adam, on the North America and West Indies station. In 1844, he was appointed lieutenant in the 16-gun brig-sloop Ringdove, serving on the west coast of Africa station. The captain of Ringdove, Commander Sir William Daniell, died in command at Sierra Leone on 12 September 1845. (The previous commander of Ringdove was Commander Keith Stewart, whose daughter Blanche was later to become William Stewart's second wife.) William Stewart's next appointment was as lieutenant in the 50-gun razee frigate Grampus, which was commissioned at Woolwich by Captain Henry Byam Martin, and then went out to the Pacific station. Stewart served in Grampus until 1847, when he studied steam engineering at Woolwich. On 18 May 1848, he was promoted to commander.

On 5 August 1851, Commander Stewart commissioned the 6-gun paddle-sloop Virago at Woolwich. Virago served on the Pacific station. On 4 December 1851, Virago put into the Chilean port of Punta Arenas in the Strait of Magellan. This city was "a penitentiary colony for relapsing criminals and relegated military". When Virago arrived, the port was in the hands of a group of mutinous prisoners "headed by one Cambiaso, second lieutenant of the troops stationed there; who... had committed some offence and been imprisoned a short time before." Cambiaso had captured two merchant vessels: the barque Florida of New Orleans and the brig Eliza Cornish of Liverpool. The officers of the Virago came on shore, visited the barracks, and the Florida, and then left the harbour without having their suspicions excited. When Virago arrived Cambiaso had considered trying to capture her, but was deterred because of "the order and discipline on board, the well manned guns, the well drilled marines", and "of the capability of even the smallest midshipman to take command of the crew in case of the absence of the superior officers". Early in January 1852, intelligence of the mutiny was transmitted to the Chilean government at Valparaíso. "The Chilean authorities despatched two Chilean men-of-war [Indefatigable and Meteoro], and some Chilean troops under Don Santiago Jorge Bynon. The troops were put on board the Chilean men-of-war; the latter on board the Virago, on the same service. The English steamer proceeded immediately to the Straits, and it was to be hoped that her officers would learn a lesson from experience, and prove themselves more sharp sighted than they had done a month before, in their former visit to the colony." The mutineers and their prisoners sailed from Punta Arenas on the Florida and the Eliza Cornish. Virago searched for, and recaptured the Eliza Cornish at sea and rescued some colonists who had been abandoned on Wood's Bay. Meanwhile, Cambiaso and his men on board the Florida had been overpowered by some of her original crew. When Virago and the Chilean ships encountered the Florida, at a place called Ancud, the Florida was back in friendly hands. Virago's crew lent assistance to Florida, took the prisoners and treasure on board. After the incident, there was some dispute about treasure recaptured by the Virago; an American called Charles H. Brown from the Florida tried to claim it was his, and wrote a book to back up his claims. On 5 April 1853, Commander Edward Marshall took over command of Virago.

== Crimean War service ==
On 9 July 1854, Stewart was promoted to captain. He was then appointed captain of the 4-gun 2nd-class paddle-frigate Firebrand, replacing Captain Hyde Parker. During this time Firebrand was serving in the Black Sea during the Crimean War during which time Stewart was wounded during the bombardment of Sebastopol, mentioned in dispatches and awarded the French Legion of Honour. He also received the Ottoman Order of the Medjidieh and the C.B. for service in the Crimea. On 29 August, Stewart was superseded by Captain William Moorsom.

On 2 February 1855, he was appointed captain of the 6-gun 2nd-class paddle-frigate Dragon; his predecessor, Captain James Willcox, had only commanded her for 11 days. Under Stewart, Dragon served in the Baltic Fleet in the second year of campaigning in the Baltic in 1855 and was present in the attack on Sweabourg, commanding the bombarding force of rocket and mortar boats (mentioned in dispatches). These operations were part of the Russian War of 1854-56 (the Crimean War).

== After the Crimean War ==
From 4 May 1857 to 3 May 1860, Stewart was captain of the Impregnable, the harbour flagship of Vice-Admiral Barrington Reynolds, Devonport. Impregnable was a 47-year-old 98-gun sail three-decker, which had been modernised in 1825–26, but had been a harbour flagship since 1839.

On 3 May 1860, he became captain of the modern 131-gun steam three-decker Marlborough, flagship of Vice-Admiral William Fanshawe Martin, C-in-C of the Mediterranean Fleet. Vice-Admiral Robert Smart superseded Vice-Admiral Martin on 20 April 1863. Stewart was superseded by Captain Charles Fellowes in June 1863.

Stewart was then superintendent of Chatham dockyard from 19 November 1863 to 30 November 1868; for part of this time, from 3 January 1866, he flew his flag in Wellesley, guard ship of ordinary, Chatham. On 1 April 1870 Stewart was promoted to rear admiral. From 13 July 1870 to 21 November 1871 Stewart was Superintendent of Devonport dockyard. From 20 November 1871 to 28 April 1872 he was Superintendent of Portsmouth dockyard.

== Controller ==
Rear Admiral Stewart was appointed Controller of the Navy on 29 April 1872, and held this post until 1 December 1881. During this time he was promoted to vice admiral (12 November 1876) and then admiral (23 November 1881). He was appointed K.C.B. (Knight Commander of the Order of the Bath) on 2 June 1877.

== End of his career ==
Admiral Stewart's last post was Commander-in-Chief, Plymouth, which he held from 1 December 1881 to 1 December 1884.

He retired on 30 March 1885. He was appointed GCB (Knight Grand Cross of the Bath) on 21 June 1887, and died in London on 13 November 1901.

== Legacy ==
Houston Stewart Channel, in the Queen Charlotte Islands, is named for William Houston Stewart.

== See also ==
- O'Byrne, William Richard (1849). "Stewart, William Houston" . A Naval Biographical Dictionary . John Murray – via Wikisource.

== Footnotes ==
Military offices
Preceded by Robert Hall	Controller of the Navy; 1872–1881	Succeeded by Sir Thomas Brandreth
Preceded by Sir Charles Elliot	Commander-in-Chief, Plymouth; 1881–1884	Succeeded by Sir Augustus Phillimore
