= Cheung Chung-kiu =

Chinese businessman from Chongqing

- Born: Zhang Songqiao; 1964 (age 61–62); Chongqing, China
- Occupation: Property developer
- Title: Chairman and founder, C C Land
- Parent: Zhang Qingxin

Cheung Chung-kiu
- Traditional Chinese: 張松橋
- Simplified Chinese: 张松桥
Transcriptions
Standard Mandarin
- Hanyu Pinyin: Zhāng Sōngqiáo
Yue: Cantonese
- Jyutping: Zoeng^{1} Cung^{4}-kiu^{4}
- IPA: [tsœŋ˥ tsʰʊŋ˩.kʰiw˩]

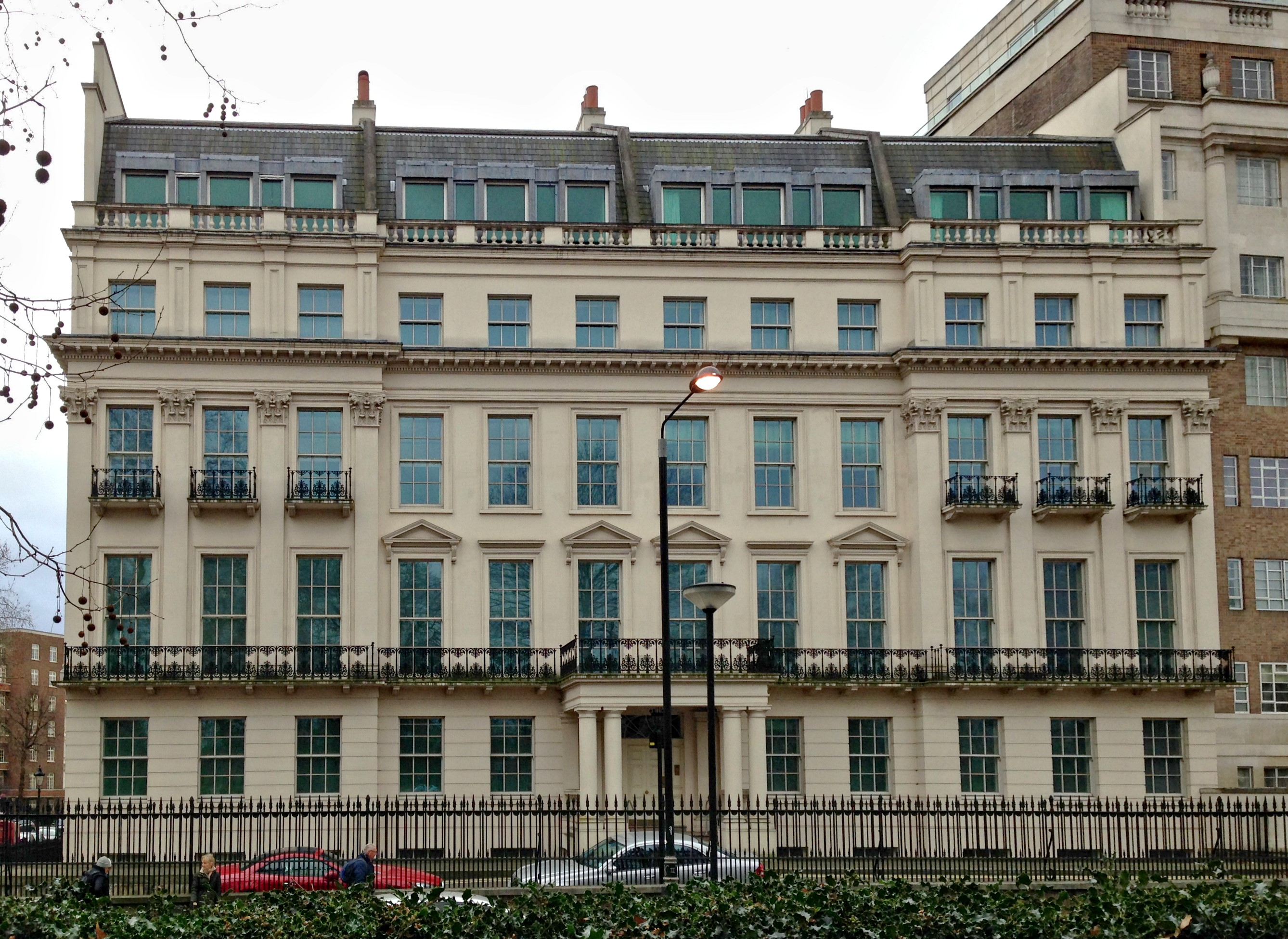
2–8a Rutland Gate, Hyde Park, London, 2016

Cheung Chung-kiu or Zhang Songqiao (Chinese: 張松橋; born 1964) is a Chinese billionaire businessman. He is the chairman of C C Land, Y.T. Realty and Yugang International.

== Early life ==
Cheung was born in 1964 in Chongqing, China, where he lived until 1980. He is the son of Zhang Qingxin, a former manager of a foreign trade enterprise, who has been a board member of some of his son's companies. In 1980, Cheung obtained residency in Hong Kong with the help of his father.

== Career ==
Cheung started his career buying electronic goods, umbrellas, watches and cassettes in Hong Kong to resell in mainland China. As his wealth grew, he moved into property, buying agricultural land in the north of Chongqing, and using that to build Chongqing's first large housing project, California Garden.

Aged 29, Cheung had one of his companies, Yugang International, listed on Hong Kong's stock exchange.

Cheung is the founder and chairman of C C Land.

In March 2017, his Hong Kong-listed company C C Land bought London's 122 Leadenhall Street from British Land and Oxford Properties (50/50 owners) for £1.15 billion.

In January 2020, Cheung was in the process of buying 2–8a Rutland Gate a 45-room 62,000 sq ft mansion overlooking Hyde Park, London from the estate of Sultan bin Abdulaziz Al Saud for between £205 and £210 million, which would make it easily the most expensive house ever sold in the UK. It is not yet known if Cheung intends to keep it as a single house or convert it into apartments, which might increase the property's value to as much as £700 million, according to a spokesman for Cheung.

== Personal life ==
Cheung is a resident of Hong Kong.
