= C C Land =

C C Land Holdings Limited 中渝置地控股有限公司
- Type: Privately held company
- Industry: Real estate
- Founded: 1992
- Headquarters: Hong Kong, China
- Area served: China
- Key people: Chairman: Cheung Chung-kiu
- Subsidiaries: Chongqing Zhongyu Property Development Company Limited
- Website: C C Land Holdings Limited

C C Land Holdings Limited (SEHK: 1224) is a manufacturer of packaging products and travel bags. The company is also involved in property development, mainly in Chongqing, China.

The company was formerly known as Qualipak International Holdings Limited. In 2006, its business was transformed to be a property developer through the acquisition of Chongqing Zhongyu Property Development Company Limited. In 2007, it changed its name to C C Land Holdings Limited.

In March 2017, CC Land bought London's Leadenhall Building for £1.15 billion.

In May 2025, C C Land sponsored the major reopening of the collection at the National Gallery in London in honour of the 200th anniversary of the gallery.
