= Henry Somerset, 6th Duke of Beaufort =

British politician (1766–1835)

His Grace The Duke of Beaufort KG
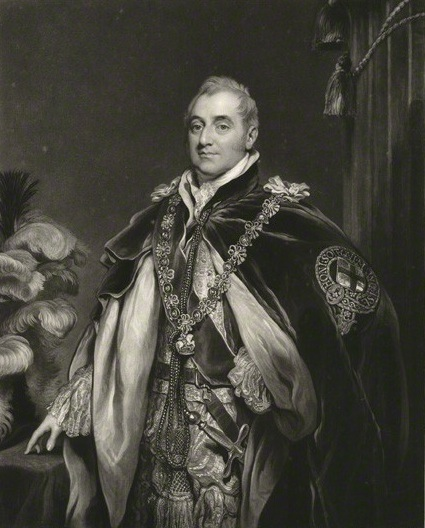
- Born: 22 December 1766
- Died: 23 November 1835 (aged 68)
- Noble family: Beaufort
- Spouse: Charlotte Sophia Leveson-Gower
- Issue: 12, including Henry, Granville, and Harriet
- Father: Henry Somerset, 5th Duke of Beaufort
- Mother: Elizabeth Boscawen

Henry Charles Somerset, 6th Duke of Beaufort (22 December 1766 – 23 November 1835), styled Marquess of Worcester until 1803, was a British politician.

== Background and education ==
Somerset was the son of Henry Somerset, 5th Duke of Beaufort and Elizabeth Boscawen. He was styled by the courtesy title Marquess of Worcester from his birth until his accession to the dukedom in 1803. He was educated at Westminster School, London and graduated from Trinity College, Oxford, on 28 June 1786 with a Master of Arts.

== Political career ==
Worcester was a Tory Member of Parliament (MP) for Monmouth between 1788 and 1790, for Bristol between 1790 and 1796, and for Gloucestershire between 1796 and 1803, when he succeeded to his father's seat in the House of Lords. He was Lord Lieutenant of Monmouthshire and Lord Lieutenant of Brecknockshire from 1803, and Lord Lieutenant of Gloucestershire from 1810, until his death in 1835. He bore the Queen's Crown for the coronation of William IV and Adelaide of Saxe-Meiningen, 8 September 1831. He became Constable of St Briavel's Castle and Warden of the Forest of Dean in 1812, and High Steward of Bristol in 1834; he held all these posts for the rest of his life. He was nominated and invested as a Knight of the Garter on 17 January 1805, and was installed on 23 April the same year; since no Knight had been installed since 1801, there were seven vacancies at the time.

He was commissioned Major in his father's Monmouth and Brecon Militia in February 1793 on the outbreak of the French Revolutionary War. He succeeded his father as Colonel of the regiment in 1803, and retained the command until his own death.

== Family ==
Worcester married Lady Charlotte Sophia Leveson-Gower (1771–1854), daughter of Granville Leveson-Gower, 1st Marquess of Stafford, on 16 May 1791 at Lambeth Church, London. They had four sons and eight daughters:

- Henry Somerset, 7th Duke of Beaufort (5 February 1792 – 17 November 1853)
- Lord Granville Charles Henry Somerset (22 December 1792 – 23 February 1848)
- Lord William George Henry Somerset (1 December 1793 – 12 January 1794)
- Lady Charlotte Sophia Somerset (25 April 1795 – 12 November 1865), married, on 12 August 1823, Frederick Gough, 4th Baron Calthorpe and had children.
- Lady Elizabeth Susan Somerset (23 June 1798 – 16 April 1876), married, on 16 April 1822, Captain Lord Edward O'Brien, and after his death, married, on 11 November 1829, Maj-Gen. James Orde.
- Lady Georgiana Augusta Somerset (8 October 1800 – 30 March 1865), married, on 30 May 1825, Granville Dudley Ryder and had issue.
- Lord Edward Henry Somerset (17 June 1802 – 19 February 1822)
- Lady Susan Carolina Somerset (10 May 1804 – 4 February 1886), married George Cholmondeley, 2nd Marquess of Cholmondeley.
- Lady Louisa Elizabeth Somerset (10 May 1806 – 26 August 1892), married, on 22 October 1832, George Finch.
- Lady Isabella Somerset (19 August 1808 – 4 February 1831), married, on 8 April 1828, Colonel Thomas Henry Kingscote (b. 19 Jan 1799, d. 19 Dec 1861)
- Lady Harriett Blanche Somerset (18 August 1811 – 25 May 1885), married, on 9 August 1833, Randolph Stewart, 9th Earl of Galloway and had children.
- Lady Mary Octavia Somerset (16 July 1814 – 7 September 1906), married, on 28 November 1837, Sir Walter Farquhar, 3rd Baronet and had children.

Beaufort died at Badminton House, Gloucestershire, and was buried there in St Michael and All Angels Church on 2 December 1835, shortly before his 69th birthday.

== Ancestry ==
Ancestors of Henry Somerset, 6th Duke of Beaufort

Charles Somerset, Marquess of Worcester
Henry Somerset, 2nd Duke of Beaufort
Rebecca Child
Charles Somerset, 4th Duke of Beaufort
Wriothesley Noel, 2nd Earl of Gainsborough
Rachel Noel
Catherine Greville
Henry Somerset, 5th Duke of Beaufort
Richard Berkeley
John Symes Berkeley
Elizabeth Symes
Elizabeth Berkeley
Walter Norborne
Elizabeth Norborne
Frances Bacon
Henry Somerset, 6th Duke of Beaufort
Edward Boscawen (MP)
Hugh Boscawen, 1st Viscount Falmouth
Jael Godolphin
Admiral Rt. Hon. Edward Boscawen
Col. Charles Godfrey
Charlotte Godfrey
Arabella Churchill
Elizabeth Boscawen
George Evelyn, MP for Bletchingley
William Evelyn Glanville, High Sheriff of Kent
Frances Broomhall
Frances Evelyn Glanville
William Glanville, Barrister of Middle Temple
Frances Glanville
Frances Hales

Parliament of Great Britain
Preceded by Sir John Stepney	Member of Parliament for Monmouth Boroughs; 1788–1790	Succeeded by Charles Bragge
Preceded by Matthew Brickdale; Henry Cruger	Member of Parliament for Bristol; 1790–1796; With: The Lord Sheffield	Succeeded by The Lord Sheffield; Charles Bragge
Preceded by Sir George Cranfield Berkeley; Thomas Master	Member of Parliament for Gloucestershire; 1796–1801; With: Sir George Cranfield Berkeley	Succeeded by Parliament of the United Kingdom
Parliament of the United Kingdom
Preceded by Parliament of Great Britain	Member of Parliament for Gloucestershire; 1801–1803; With: Sir George Cranfield Berkeley	Succeeded by Sir George Cranfield Berkeley; Lord Robert Somerset
Honorary titles
Preceded by The Duke of Beaufort	Lord Lieutenant of Brecknockshire; 1803–1835	Succeeded by Penry Williams
Preceded by The Duke of Beaufort	Lord Lieutenant of Monmouthshire; 1803–1835	Succeeded by Capel Hanbury Leigh
Preceded by The Earl of Berkeley	Lord Lieutenant of Gloucestershire; 1810–1835	Succeeded by The Lord Segrave
Preceded by The Earl of Berkeley	Vice-Admiral of Gloucestershire; 1810–1835	Vacant
Peerage of England
Preceded by Henry Somerset	Duke of Beaufort; 1803–1835	Succeeded by Henry Somerset
