= Keith Stewart (Royal Navy officer) =

East India Company army officer

Admiral The Honourable Keith Stewart CB
- Born: 3 January 1814
- Died: 15 September 1879 (aged 65)
- Relatives: George Stewart, 8th Earl of Galloway (father); Lady Jane Paget (mother); Henry Paget, 1st Marquess of Anglesey (uncle)
- Military career
- Allegiance: United Kingdom
- Branch: Royal Navy
- Rank: Admiral
- Commands: HMS Ringdove; HMS Nankin; HMS Termagant
- Conflicts: Greek War of Independence; Battle of Navarino; Second Opium War
- Awards: Companion of the Order of the Bath

Admiral Keith Stewart CB (3 January 1814 – 15 September 1879) was a British aristocrat and Naval officer, from an influential political and military family.

== Early life ==
Stewart was born on 3 January 1814, the son of George Stewart, 8th Earl of Galloway and Lady Jane Paget.

== Naval career ==
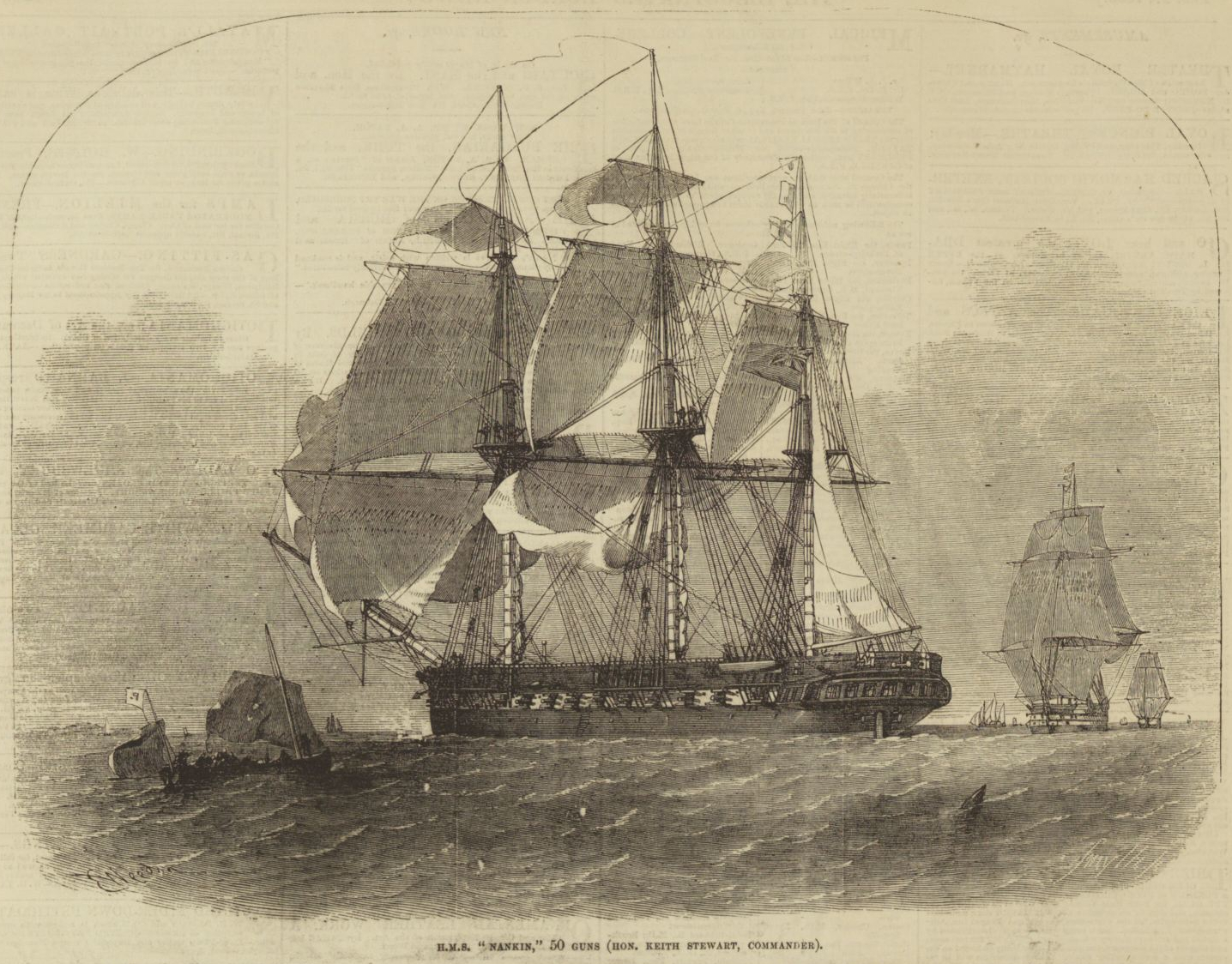
Nankin, commanded by Stewart in 1855

Stewart entered the Navy as a midshipman on 3 April 1827, aged 13 on HMS Asia, flagship of Admiral Sir Edward Codrington in the Battle of Navarino. He gained his commission on 13 June 1833 and was appointed lieutenant of Asia on 17 August 1833, at that point the flagship of Rear-Admiral Sir William Parker. Stewart served from 11 October 1833 until December 1835 at which point he was appointed to HMS Stag under Captain Nicholas Lockyer just off Portugal where he served until 15 February 1837 at which point he was appointed to HMS Cornwallis, the flagship of Vice-Admiral Sir Charles Paget on the North America and West Indies Station. After which, he was promoted to commander of HMS Ringdove on 14 October 1838 and continued at that rank until his promotion to captain on 1 July 1842. Whilst captain of Ringdove, Stewart was employed in the suppression of the slave trade in the West Indies. He went on to become commander of HMS Nankin and was congratulated by Admiral Sir Charles Napier and by Rear-Admiral Sir Michael Seymour for his defence against piracy in China. From 1857 to 1859 Stewart was gazetted three times for his service during the Second Opium War and in March 1857 he was promoted to commodore and appointed a Companion of the Order of the Bath. Following the end of the Second Opium War Stewart was promoted to rear-admiral in May 1862, vice-admiral in October 1867 and to admiral in July 1875.

== Personal life ==
Stewart married Mary Caroline FitzRoy, daughter of Sir Charles FitzRoy and Lady Mary Lennox, daughter of Charles Lennox, 4th Duke of Richmond on 9 August 1841 whilst a commander. He and Mary had nine children together:

- Mary Jane Stewart, married Reginald Dykes Marshall of Castlerigg Manor, Cumberland
- Edith Stewart, married Colonel Edward St. Aubyn, son of Sir Edward St Aubyn, 1st Baronet
- Blanche Caroline Stewart, married Admiral Sir William Houston Stewart grandson of Sir Michael Stewart, 5th Baronet
- Ellinor Sydney Stewart, married Spencer Chapman
- Mabel Augusta Stewart, married Captain Gilbert Gordon Blane of Foliejon Park, Berkshire
- Hilda Eugenia Stewart, married Arthur Rhuven Guest, grandson of Sir Josiah Guest
- Louisa Wilhelmina Stewart, married Kyrle Alfred Chapman
- Caroline Ethel Gertrude Stewart, married Canon Mark James
- Rosa Frances Stewart, married Captain John Edmund Audley Harvey

Stewart died on 15 September 1879 aged 65.
