= Harriet Stewart, Countess of Galloway =

Harriet (or "Harriett) Stewart, Countess of Galloway (18 August 1811 – 25 May 1885), formerly Lady Harriet Blanche Somerset, was the wife of Randolph Stewart, 9th Earl of Galloway.

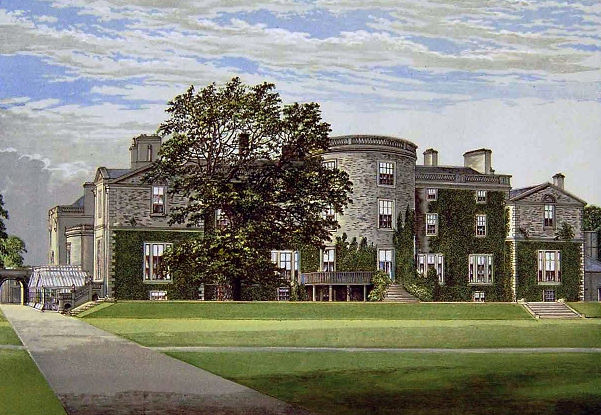
Galloway House, c.1800

She was the daughter of Henry Somerset, 6th Duke of Beaufort, and the former Lady Charlotte Sophia Leveson-Gower.

She married the future earl, who was eleven years older then her, on 9 August 1833, a year before he succeeded in the earldom, while he was Lord-Lieutenant of Kirkcudbrightshire and Wigtownshire.

The earl and countess had six sons and seven daughters, including:

- Lady Helen Blanche Stewart (1834-1903), who married Walter Clifford Mellor
- Alan Plantagenet Stewart, 10th Earl of Galloway (1835-1901), who married Lady Mary Arabella Arthur Gascoyne-Cecil
- Randolph Henry Stewart, 11th Earl of Galloway (1836-1920), who married Amy Mary Pauline Cliffe and had issue.
- Maj.-Gen. Hon. Alexander Stewart (1838-1896), who married Adela Maria Loder and had issue.
- Lady Emma Georgiana Stewart (c.1840-1869), who married Wilbraham Frederic Tollemache, 2nd Baron Tollemache of Helmingham, and had issue.
- Lady Mary Louisa Stewart (1842-1929), who married Charles Edward Stephen Cooke.
- Lady Jane Charlotte Stewart (c.1844-1897), who married Henry Anthony Spedding.
- Lady Emily Octavia Stewart (1847-1929), who married Hon. Francis Algernon James Chichester and had issue.
- Lady Henrietta Caroline Stewart (1850-1930), who married Algernon Turnor.
- Lady Isabel Maud Stewart (1852-1927), unmarried.
- Hon. Fitzroy Somerset Keith Stewart (1858-1914), who married Elizabeth Louisa Rogers and had issue.

In the course of their marriage, considerable work was done on the family seat, Galloway House. William Burn was employed in 1841to carry out alterations, including an additional floor in parts of the building.

The earl died in 1873 and was succeeded in turn by his eldest son Alan Stewart, 10th Earl of Galloway, and subsequently by his second son Randolph. The countess died in 1885 at her home in Eaton Square, London, aged 74.
