= R&F Properties =

Chinese property development company

Guangzhou R&F Properties 广州富力地产股份有限公司
- Type: Public
- Traded as: SEHK: 2777
- Industry: Real estate development
- Founded: 1994
- Headquarters: Guangzhou, Guangdong, China
- Area served: China
- Key people: Li Szelim (Chairman); Zhang Li (Vice-chairman)
- Website: www.rfchina.com

Guangzhou R&F Properties
- Simplified Chinese: 广州富力地产股份有限公司
- Traditional Chinese: 廣州富力地產股份有限公司
Transcriptions
Standard Mandarin
- Hanyu Pinyin: Guǎngzhōu Fùlì Dìchǎn Gǔfènyǒuxiàngōngsī
Yue: Cantonese
- Jyutping: gwong2 zau1 fu3 lik6 dei6 caan2 jau5 haan6 gung1 si1

R&F Properties (Chinese: 富力地产; pinyin: Fùlì Dìchǎn; Jyutping: fu3 lik6 dei6 caan2) is a Chinese property developer based in Zhujiang New Town, Guangzhou, Guangdong. Established in 1994, it is one of the largest-scale real estate companies in Guangzhou. It is engaged in integrating real estate design, development, engineering supervision, sales, property management and real estate intermediary.

Its H shares were listed at the Hong Kong Stock Exchange on 14 July 2005. It is also the first mainland real estate enterprise joining into Hang Seng China Enterprises Index.

== History ==
R&F Properties was founded in 1994 by Li Silian and was listed on the main board of the Hong Kong Stock Exchange in July 2005. It once became one of the constituent stocks of the Hang Seng China Enterprises Index but was removed in 2011.

In December 2009, R&F Properties, together with a consortium of Country Garden and Agile Properties, acquired the land for the Asian Games City in Panyu, Guangzhou, for RMB 25.5 billion.

In April 2010, R&F Real Estate purchased a piece of land in Xianshuigu Town, Jinnan, Tianjin for RMB 7.05 billion, setting a record for the volume and highest land price of a single project in Tianjin.

In June 2011, R&F Real Estate acquired the Chinese Football Club Shenzhen Phoenix Football Club, which was on the verge of dissolution due to financial difficulties, and changed its name to Guangzhou R&F Football Club.

On December 2, 2013, R&F Properties acquired six plots of land in Johor Bahru from the royal family of Sultan Ibrahim Johor, Malaysia, for approximately 4.5 billion Malaysian dollars (approximately HK$10.81 billion), with a site area of approximately 116 acres, with an estimated salable floor area of properties to be developed reaching 3.5 million square meters. On June 21, 2014, R&F Properties officially launched this development project and named it Princess Cove Tanjung Puteri.

On July 19, 2017, Wanda Group, Sunac China and R&F Properties held a cooperation press conference in Beijing to announce the details of asset sales. Among them, R&F Properties acquired the entire equity of 76 hotel projects under Wanda Group and Yantai Wanda Vista Hotel for RMB 19.906 billion. 70% equity, the net asset value of 77 hotels is expected to be no less than 33.176 billion yuan, including the estimated cost of two unopened hotels, with a total construction area of approximately 3.286 million square meters and a total of 23,202 rooms, acquired from Wanda at a lower price After Price takes over 77 Wanda hotels, R&F Real Estate will hold more than 100 hotels, becoming the world's largest five-star hotel owner, with 77 hotels, revenue of 5.3 billion yuan in 2016, and profit of more than 800 million yuan.

On December 19, 2019, R&F Properties placed 273 million new shares into the market at HK$13.68 per share, accounting for approximately 26.89% of the currently issued H shares and 8.47% of the total issued share capital. After the placement is completed, it will account for 21.19% of the enlarged H shares, accounting for 7.81% of the total share capital. The proceeds raised are approximately HK$3.735 billion, which will be used to repay overseas debts

In April 2020, R&F Properties sold its property management business to its major shareholder for RMB 330 million.

In July 2023, R&F Real Estate was filed for bankruptcy liquidation by Guangdong Xiangzheng Trading Co., Ltd. and Guangzhou Guangfeng Concrete Co., Ltd. R&F Real Estate explained that its turmoil originated from a commercial ticket dispute with a subject matter of 20 million yuan. In response to this, R&F Real Estate responded to a reporter from Guangzhou Daily: Guangzhou R&F's current assets are higher than its liabilities, there is no insolvency, and its operations are normal and there is no reason for bankruptcy; it is actively working with Guangfeng Concrete and Xiangzheng Trading Negotiations for reconciliation are ongoing. On July 14, the Guangzhou Intermediate People's Court ruled not to accept the bankruptcy liquidation application filed by Guangfeng Concrete and Xiangzheng Trading against R&F Real Estate.

== Developments ==
- Tianjin R&F Guangdong Tower
- Tianjin R&F Center
- R&F Princess Cove
  - R&F Mall (Johor Bahru)
- Vauxhall Square, London (UK), (cancelled)

== Subsidiaries ==
- Guangzhou City F.C.
- R&F (Hong Kong)
