= List of people with surname Spencer =

This is a list of people with surname Spencer.

== A ==
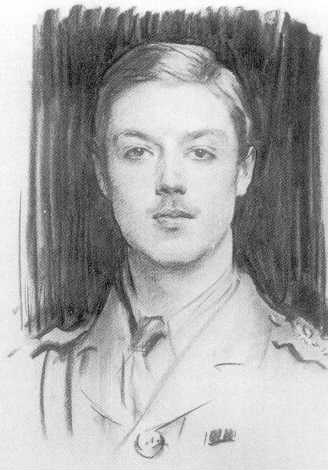
Albert Spencer, Viscount Althorp, in WWI uniform. Drawn by John Singer Sargent, in 1915

- Abigail Spencer (born 1981), American actress
- Adam Spencer (born 1969), Australian radio presenter, comedian, and media personality
- Adriano Spencer (1959–2006), Portuguese footballer
- Alan Spencer (writer), American television writer and producer
- Alan Spencer (cricketer) (born 1936), English cricketer
- Albert Spencer, 7th Earl Spencer (1892–1975), British peer
- Albert Spencer (footballer) (fl. 1920s), English footballer
- Alberto Spencer (1937–2006), Ecuadorian football player
- Alf Spencer, English footballer
- Ambrose Spencer (1765–1848), American lawyer and politician
- Andre Spencer (born 1964), American basketball player
- Anna Garlin Spencer (1851–1931), American educator, feminist, and Unitarian minister
- Anne Spencer (disambiguation), multiple people, including:
  - Anne Spencer (1882–1975), American poet
  - Anne Spencer, Countess of Sunderland (1683–1716)
  - Anne Spencer, Countess of Sunderland (died 1715)
  - Anne Spencer (WRNS officer) (1938–2012), director of the Women's Royal Naval Service
- Aubrey Spencer (1795–1872), Anglican Bishop of Jamaica

== B ==
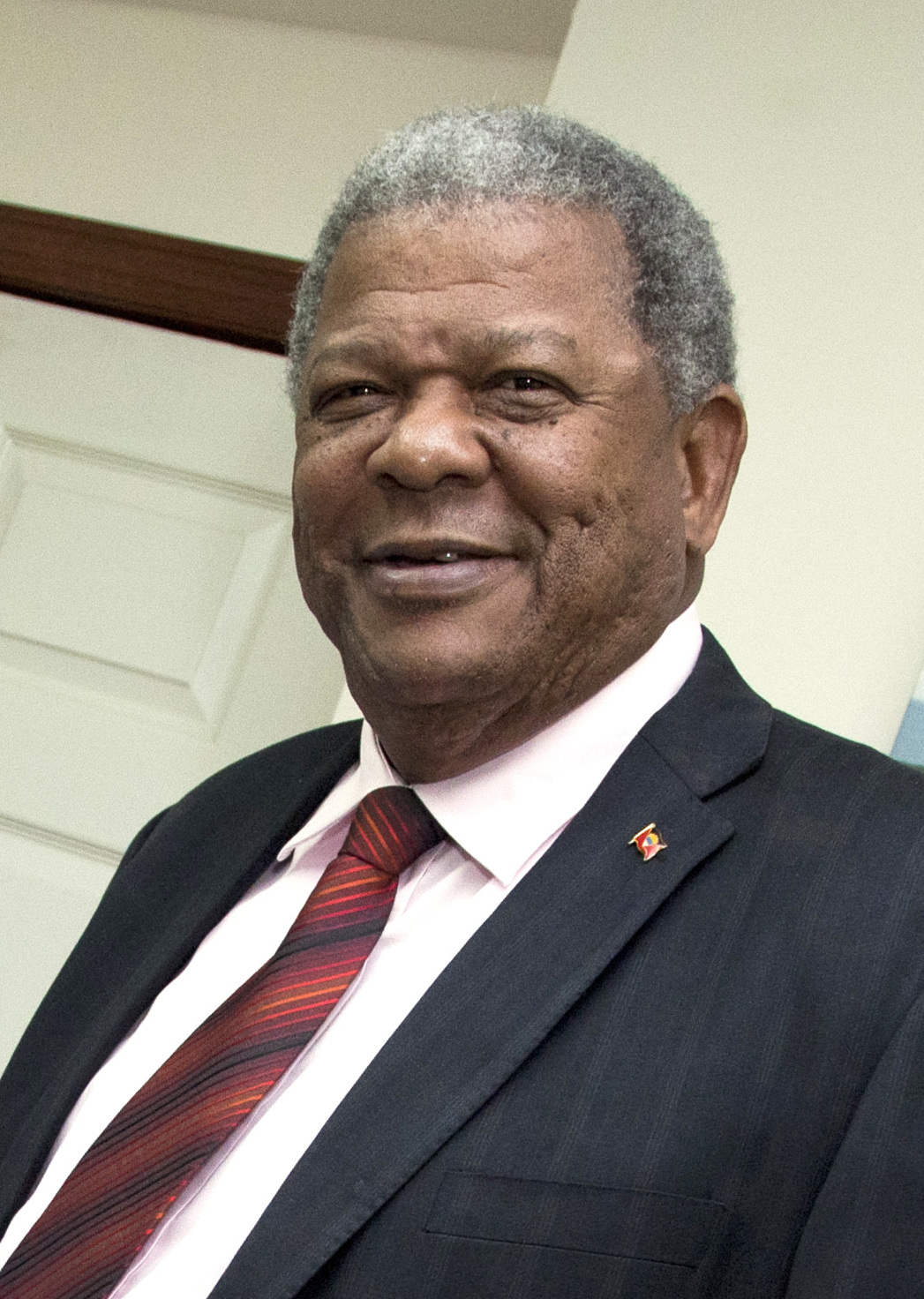
Baldwin Spencer Prime Minister of Antigua and Barbuda from 2004 to 2014.

- Baldwin Spencer (born 1948), Prime Minister of Antigua and Barbuda
- Baldwin Spencer (anthropologist) (1860–1929), British-born anthropologist who worked in Australia
- Barb Spencer (born 1966), Canadian curler
- Barbara J. Spencer, Australian-Canadian economist
- Benjamin T. Spencer (1904–1996), American professor of literature
- Bernard Spencer (1909–1963), English poet, translator, and editor
- Bob Spencer (born 1957), Australian rock guitarist
- Brian Spencer (1949–1988), Canadian ice hockey player
- Brian Spencer (field hockey) (born 1962), American field hockey player
- Bruce Spencer, American drummer
- Bud Spencer (1929–2016), Italian actor, filmmaker and professional swimmer

== C ==
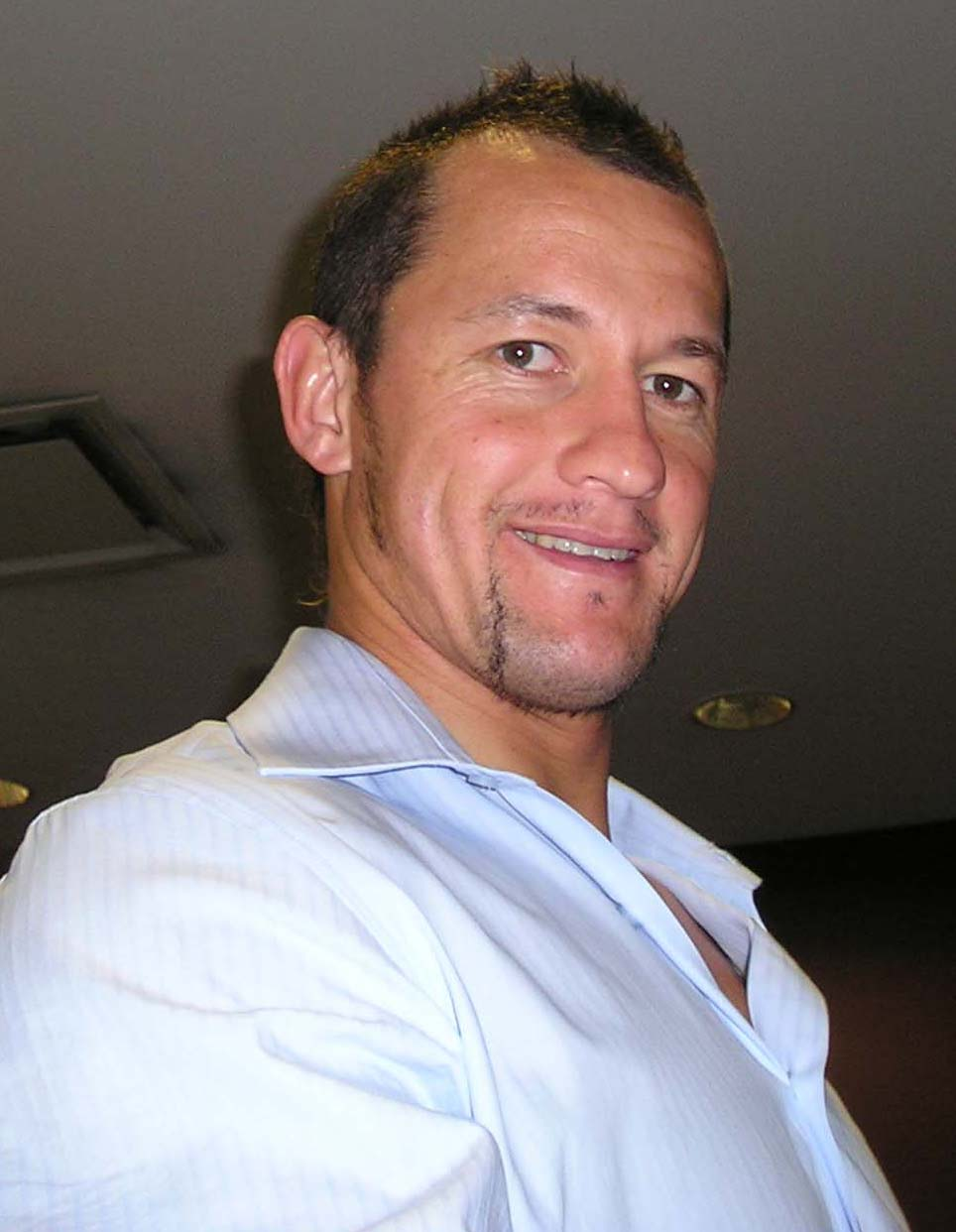
Carlos Spencer, New Zealand All Blacks stand off, 2008

- Cam Spencer (born 2000), American basketball player
- Carlos Spencer (born 1975), New Zealand rugby union footballer
- Caroline Spencer (suffragist) (1861–1928), American physician and suffragist
- Cedric Spencer, Australian politician and lawyer
- Charles Spencer (disambiguation), multiple people including:
  - Charles Spencer, 3rd Earl of Sunderland (1675–1722), English statesman
  - Charles Spencer, 3rd Duke of Marlborough (1706–1758), British soldier and politician
  - Lord Charles Spencer (1740–1820), 2nd son of the 3rd Duke of Marlborough
  - Charles Spencer, 6th Earl Spencer (1857–1922), British courtier and Liberal politician
  - Charles Spencer, 9th Earl Spencer (born 1964), brother of Diana, Princess of Wales
  - Charles Spencer (journalist) (born 1955), British journalist and drama critic
  - Charles Spencer (American football) (born 1982), American football player
- Charlie Spencer (1899–1953), England and Newcastle United footballer
- Charlotte Spencer, Countess Spencer (1835–1903), British peeress
- Charlotte Spencer (actress), (born 1991), English actress
- Chaske Spencer (born 1975), American actor
- Chelsea Spencer (born 1993), English bowls player
- Chris Spencer (disambiguation), multiple people, including:
  - Chris Spencer (actor) (born 1968), American actor, comedian, writer and producer
  - Chris Spencer (American football) (born 1982), American football player
- Christopher Miner Spencer (1833–1922), American inventor
- Colin Spencer (born 1933), English writer
- Cosens Spencer (1874–1930), Canadian film exhibitor and producer in Australia
- Cynthia Spencer, Countess Spencer (1897–1972), British peeress

== D ==
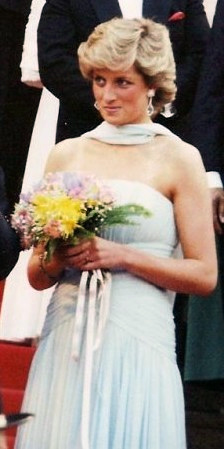
Lady Diana Spencer, the Princess of Wales, at the 1987 Cannes Film Festival.

- Dan Spencer (born 1965), American baseball coach
- Daniel Spencer (disambiguation), multiple people, including:
  - Daniel Spencer (Mormon) (1794–1868), mayor of Nauvoo, Illinois and Mormon pioneer
  - Daniel Spencer (environmentalist), Australian climate activist
- Danielle Spencer (disambiguation), multiple people, including:
  - Danielle Spencer (American actress) (born 1965), African-American actress
  - Danielle Spencer (Australian actress) (born 1969), Australian singer, songwriter and actress
- Dante Spencer (born 1976), American model and actor
- David Spencer (disambiguation), multiple people, including:
  - David A. Spencer, American engineering professor
  - David D. Spencer (1799–1855), New York editor and politician
  - David W. Spencer, Canadian department store founder
  - David Spencer (playwright) (born 1955), British playwright
- Denzel Spencer (born 1996), Canadian singer, rapper and songwriter known professionally as Roy Woods
- Derek Spencer (1936–2023), British politician
- Derrick Spencer (born 1982), South African footballer
- Diana Russell, Duchess of Bedford, Duchess of Bedford (1710–1735), wife of 4th Duke of Bedford
- Diana, Princess of Wales Lady Diana Spencer (1961–1997), first wife of Prince Charles
- Domina Eberle Spencer (1920–2022), American mathematician
- Don Spencer (born 1937), Australian children's television presenter and musician
- Don Spencer (cricketer) (1912–1971), English cricketer
- Donald C. Spencer (1912–2001), American mathematician
- Dorothy Spencer, Countess of Sunderland (1617–1684), British peeress

== E ==
- E. Spencer Miller (1817–1879), Dean of the University of Pennsylvania Law School

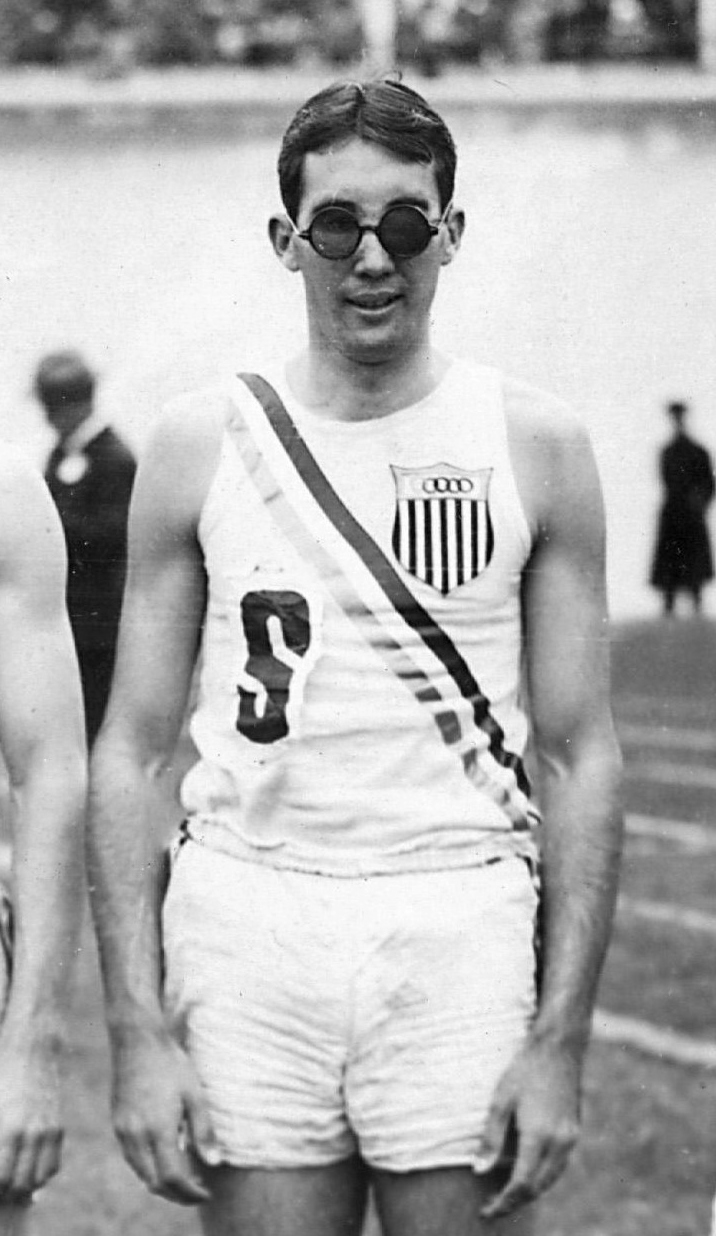
Emerson Spencer won a gold medal in the 1928 Summer Olympics.

- Earl Winfield Spencer Jr. (1888–1950), United States Navy pilot
- Earle Spencer (1925–1973), American big band leader from the late 1940s
- Edmund Spenser (c. 1552–1599), poet, author of The Faerie Queene
- Edmund Spencer (chess player) (1876–1936), English chess master
- Edward Spencer (disambiguation), multiple people, including:
  - Edward Spencer (athlete) (1882–1965), British race walker
  - Edward Spencer (English politician) (1594–1656), English politician
- Elihu Spencer (1721–1784), American clergyman
- Elizabeth Spencer (disambiguation), multiple people, including:
  - Lady Elizabeth Spencer (1737–1831), wife of Henry Herbert, 10th Earl of Pembroke
  - Elizabeth Spencer, Baroness Hunsdon (1552–1618), English scholar, and arts patron
  - Elizabeth Spencer (writer) (1921–2019), American novelist and short story writer
  - Elizabeth Spencer (soprano) (died 1935), American soprano, recorded for Thomas Edison
- Elmore Spencer (born 1969), American basketball player
- Emerson Spencer (1906–1985), American sprint runner
- Emily Spencer Hayden (1869–1949), American photographer

== F ==
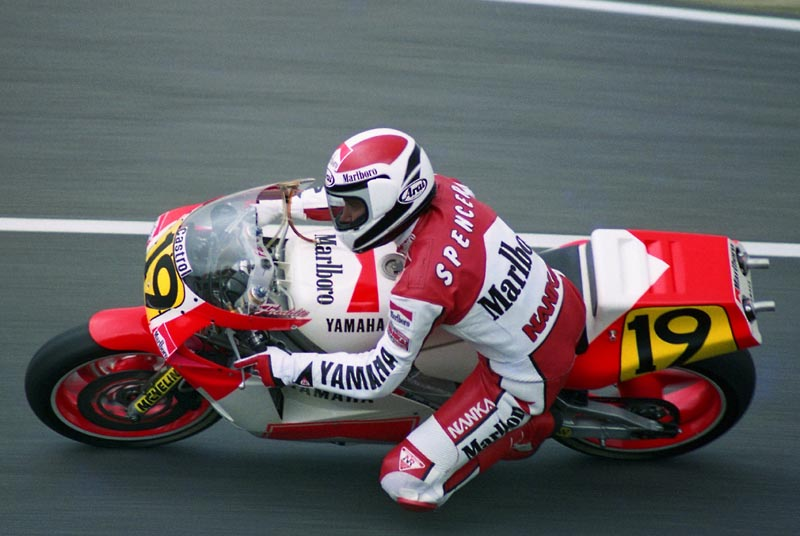
Freddie Spencer at the 1989 Japanese Grand Prix.

- Fannie Morris Spencer (1865–1943), composer and organist
- Fanny Bixby Spencer (1879–1930), American philanthropist and activist
- Felton Spencer (born 1968), American basketball player
- Florence Margaret Spencer Palmer (1900–1987), composer
- Francis Spencer, 1st Baron Churchill (1779–1845), British peer and Whig politician
- Freddie Spencer (born 1961), American motorcycle racer
- Frederick Spencer, 4th Earl Spencer (1798–1857), British naval commander and Whig politician
- Fred Spencer (1904–1938), American animator
- Fred Spencer (footballer) (1871–1959), English footballer
- F. Richard Spencer (born 1951), Roman Catholic bishop for US military

== G ==
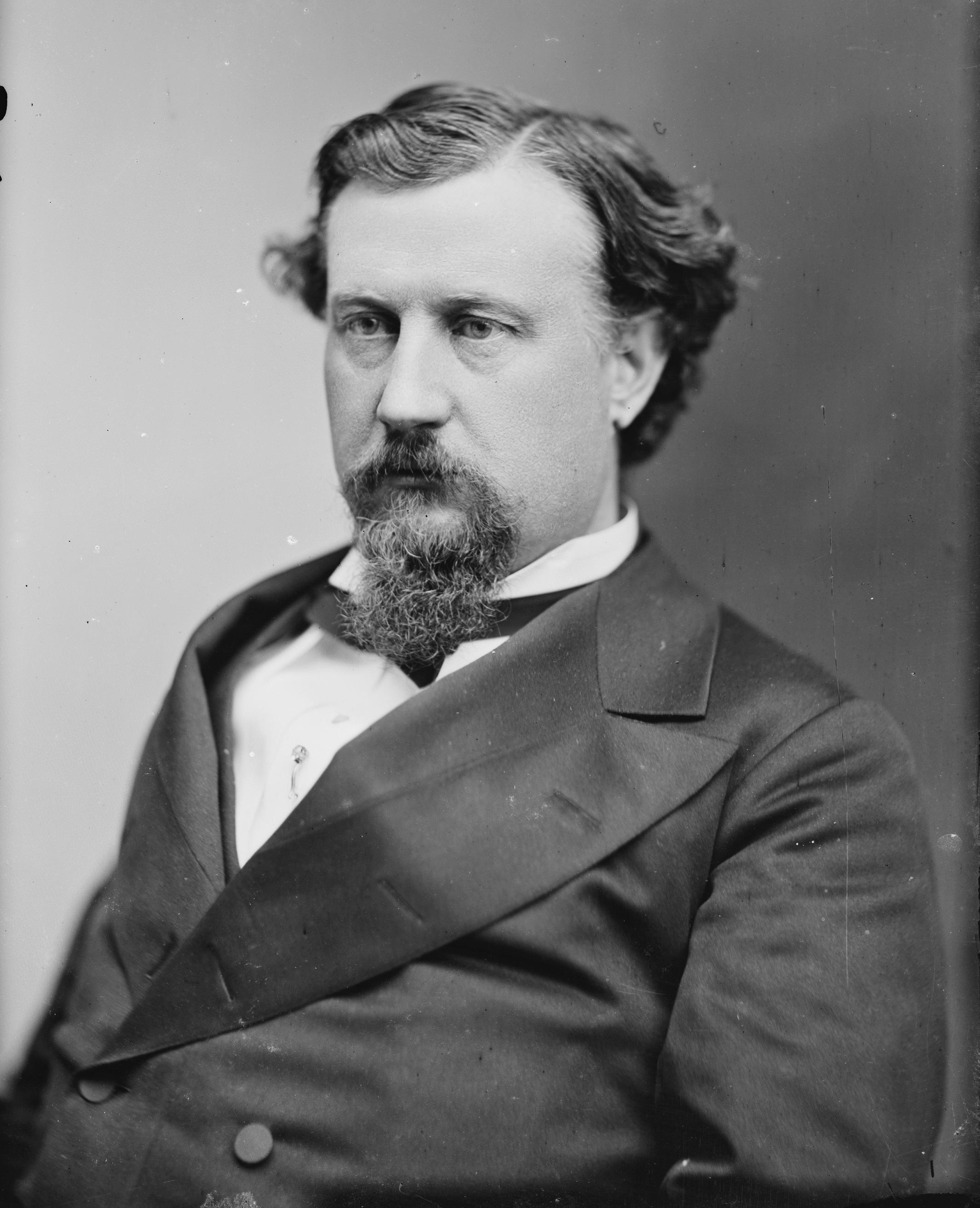
George E. Spencer, US Senator from Alabama 1868–1879

- G. Lloyd Spencer (1893–1981), American politician from Arkansas
- George Spencer (disambiguation), multiple people including:
  - George Spencer, 4th Duke of Marlborough (1739–1817), British courtier and politician
  - George Spencer, 2nd Earl Spencer (1758–1834), British Whig politician
  - George Spencer (bishop) (1799–1866), Anglican bishop
  - George E. Spencer (1836–1893), American senator from Alabama
  - George Alfred Spencer (1872–1957), Member of Parliament for Broxtowe, 1918–1929
  - George Spencer (baseball) (1926–2014), American baseball pitcher
  - George Spencer (rugby) (1878–1950), New Zealand rugby football player
- Gillian Spencer (born 1939), American soap opera actress and writer
- Glenn Spencer (disambiguation)
- Gwendolyn Spencer (1916–2015), Jamaican nurse and midwife

== H ==
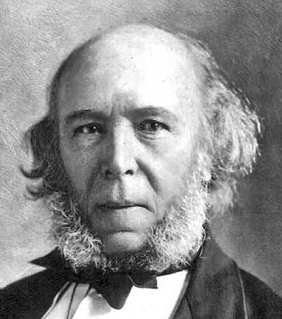
Herbert Spencer (1820–1903) English philosopher, promoter of Social Darwinism

- Hannah Spencer (born 1991), British politician
- Harry Spencer (disambiguation), multiple people, including:
  - Harry Spencer (cricketer, born 1868) (1868–1937), cricketer for Derbyshire
  - Harry Spencer (cricketer, born 1901) (1901–1954), cricketer for Worcestershire and Warwickshire
  - Harry Spencer (footballer), New Zealand footballer
- Hazelton Spencer (1757–1813), Upper Canadian soldier, political figure and judge
- Henry Spencer (disambiguation), multiple people, including:
  - Henry Spencer (born 1955), Canadian computer programmer and space enthusiast
  - Henry Spencer, 1st Earl of Sunderland (1620–1643), English nobleman and soldier
  - Lord Henry Spencer (1770–1795), British diplomat and politician
  - Henry Elvins Spencer (1882–1972), Canadian politician
  - Henry E. Spencer (1807–1882), American politician, mayor of Cincinnati
- Herbert Spencer (disambiguation), multiple people, including:
  - Herbert Spencer (1820–1903), English philosopher and biologist
  - Herbert Spencer (graphic designer) (1924–2002), British graphic designer
  - Herbert Harvey Spencer (1869–1926), English manufacturer and Liberal Party politician
  - Herbert Lincoln Spencer (1894–1960), president of Bucknell University from 1945 to 1949
  - Herbert W. Spencer (1905–1992), American film and television composer and orchestrator
- Howard Spencer (1875–1940), English footballer

== I ==
- Ian Spencer (born 1984), English cricketer
- Ivan Q. Spencer (1888–1970), American Pentecostal minister
- Ivor Spencer (1924–2009), English chef, toastmaster, and entrepreneur

== J ==
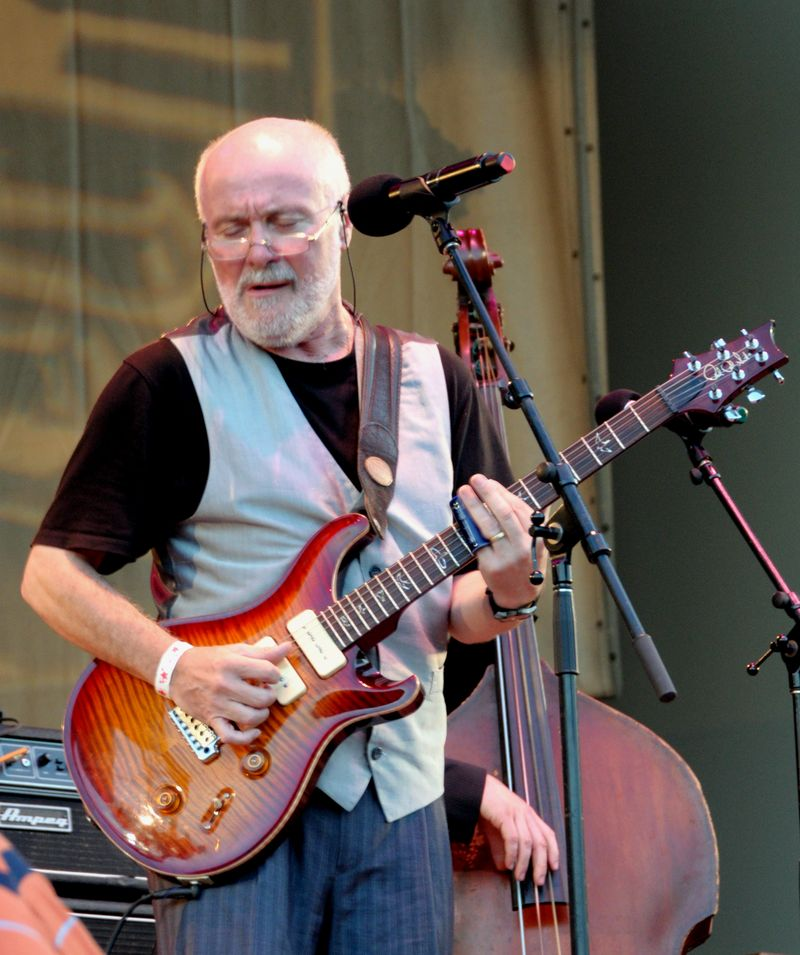
Jeremy Spencer was one of the guitarists in the original line-up of Fleetwood Mac

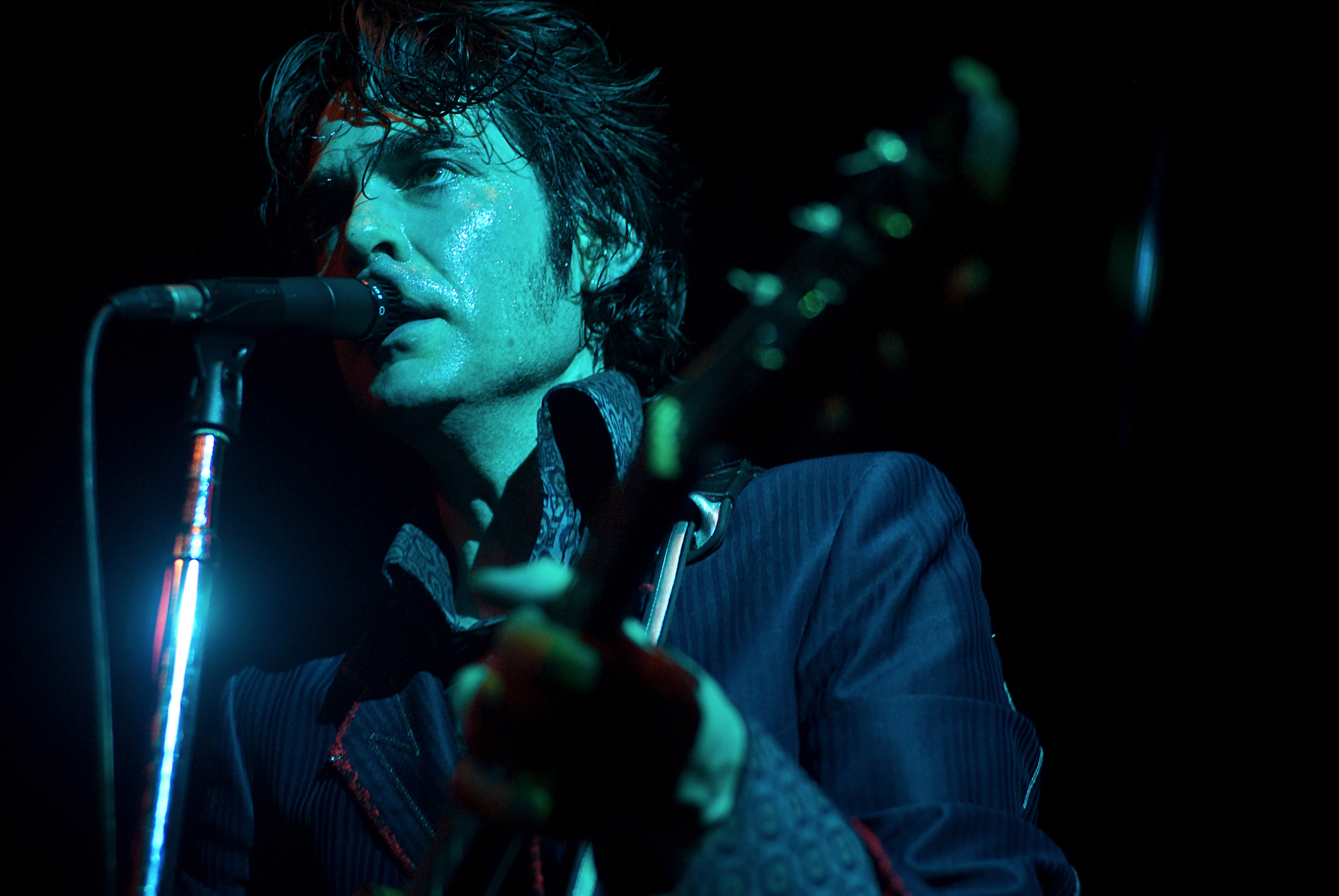
Jon Spencer performing with Heavy Trash in 2009

- James Spencer (disambiguation), multiple people
- Jane Spencer (disambiguation), multiple people, including:
  - Jane Spencer (journalist), American journalist
  - Jane Spencer (director), American film director
  - Jane Spencer, Baroness Churchill (1826–1900), English peeress
- Jean Spencer (gymnast) (born 1940), New Zealand Olympic gymnast
- Jean Spencer (artist) (1942–1998), British artist
- Jeremy Spencer (disambiguation), multiple people, including:
  - Jeremy Spencer (born 1948), of Fleetwood Mac
  - Jeremy Spencer (drummer) (born 1973), of Five Finger Death Punch
- Jesse Spencer (born 1979), Australian actor and musician
- Jim Spencer (1946–2002), American baseball first baseman
- Jimmy Spencer (racing driver) (born 1957), American television commentator and NASCAR driver
- Joe Spencer (American football) (1923–1996), American football player
- Joel Spencer (born 1946) American mathematician
- John Spencer (disambiguation), multiple people
- Jon Spencer (born 1965), American singer, composer and guitarist
- Joseph Spencer (1714–1789), American lawyer and politician from Connecticut
- Joseph Spencer (New York politician) (1790–1823), American lawyer and politician from New York
- Joshua A. Spencer (1790–1857), American lawyer and New York politician
- June Spencer (1919–2024), English actress

== K ==
- Karyn Spencer, American film director
- Kenneth Spencer (disambiguation), multiple people, including:
  - Kenneth A. Spencer (1902–1960), American philanthropist and businessman in the chemical industry
  - Kenneth Abendana Spencer (1929–2005), Jamaican painter
  - Kenneth Spencer (singer) (1913–1964), American singer and actor
- Kevin Spencer (disambiguation), multiple people, including:
  - Kevin Spencer (musician) (born 1978), Canadian singer-songwriter
  - Kevin Spencer (American football) (born 1953), American football coach for the Arizona Cardinals
  - Kevin Spencer (cyclist), Australian cyclist
- Kim Spencer (born 1948), American television producer and executive
- Lady Kitty Spencer (born 1990), English model
- Kyle Spencer (tennis) (born 1976), male former tennis player from the United Kingdom
- Kyle Spencer (journalist), American author and journalist

== L ==
- Lara Spencer (born 1969), American television journalist
- Larry Spencer (1941–2022), Canadian pastor and politician
- Larry O. Spencer (born 1954), United States Air Force general
- Len Spencer (1867–1914), American recording artist
- Leonard James Spencer (1870–1959), British geologist
- Lindsay Spencer (1914–1997), Australian rugby league footballer
- Lloyd Spencer (1893–1981), American politician
- Loretta Spencer (born 1937), American politician, mayor of Huntsville, Alabama
- Louis Spencer, Viscount Althorp (born 1994)

== M ==
- Marian Spencer (1920–2019), American politician
- Mark Spencer (disambiguation), multiple people
- Marquiss Spencer (born 1997), American football player
- Mary Spencer, Canadian boxer
- Mary C. Spencer (1842–1923), American librarian
- Mason Spencer (1892–1962), American lawyer, planter, and politician from Louisiana
- Megan Spencer (born 1966), Australian documentary film maker
- Michael Spencer (born 1955), British businessman
- Mike Spencer, English record producer

== N ==
- Nicholas Spencer, (1633–1689), English merchant and politician emigrated to Colony of Virginia
- Noel Spencer (born 1977), Australian (soccer) football player and coach

== O ==
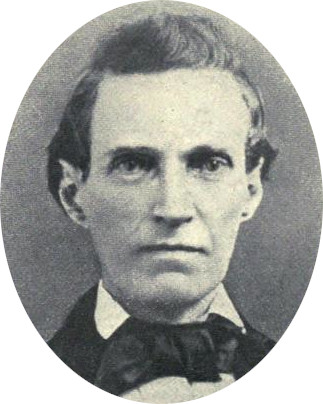
Orson Spencer was president of the University of Utah 1850–1852.

- Octavia Spencer (born 1970), American actress, author, producer
- Oliver Spencer (1736–1811), American Revolutionary War officer from New Jersey
- Oliver M. Spencer (1829–1895), American president of the University of Iowa
- Ollie Spencer (1931–1991), American football tackle and assistant coach
- Orson Spencer (1802–1855), American writer and prominent member of The Church of Jesus Christ of Latter-day Saints

== P ==
Phil Spencer has hosted several real-estate programmes.

- Pam Spencer (born 1957), American high jumper
- Paula Spencer (journalist), American journalist and author
- Peggy Spencer (1920–2016), British ballroom dancer and choreographer
- Percy Spencer (1894–1970), American physicist and inventor of the microwave oven
- Peter Spencer (disambiguation), multiple people, including:
  - Peter Spencer (religious leader) (1782–1843), American Christian leader
  - Peter Spencer (journalist) (active 1970s onwards), British television news journalist
  - Peter Spencer (Royal Navy officer) (born 1947), British naval officer and procurement chief
  - Peter Spencer (footballer) (born 1956), Australian rules footballer
  - Peter Spencer (farmer) (born c. 1948), Australian political activist
- Phil Spencer (television personality) (born 1969), British television presenter and journalist
- Phil Spencer (business executive), American business executive
- Philip Spencer (sailor) (1823–1842), American midshipman
- Platt Rogers Spencer (1800–1864), American calligrapher

== R ==
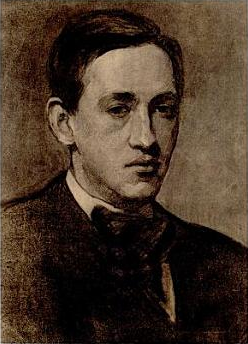
1909 self-portrait by Robert Carpenter Spencer.

- Ray Spencer (1933–2016), English footballer
- Richard Spencer (disambiguation), multiple people including:
  - Richard Spencer (died 1661) (1593–1661), English politician and Royalist
  - Richard Spencer (Maryland) (1796–1868), member of US House of Representatives
  - Richard Lewis Spencer, African-American musician and teacher
  - Richard Spencer (Royal Navy officer) (1779–1839)
  - Richard Spencer (journalist) (born 1965), British journalist
  - Richard Spencer (athlete) (born 1955), Cuban former high jumper
  - Richard B. Spencer (born 1978), American white supremacist writer, publisher, and activist
- Robert Spencer (disambiguation), multiple people including:
  - Robert Spencer, 2nd Earl of Sunderland
  - Robert Spencer, 4th Earl of Sunderland
  - Robert Spencer (artist) (1879–1931), American painter
  - Robert Spencer (author) (born 1962), American author, blogger, and critic of Islam
  - Robert Spencer (doctor) (1889–1969), American general practitioner and abortion care provider
- Ron Spencer, American fantasy illustrator
- Roy Spencer (disambiguation), multiple people, including:
  - Roy Spencer (scientist), American meteorologist and research scientist
  - Roy Spencer (baseball) (1900–1973), American Major League Baseball catcher
  - Roy Spencer (actor), British actor, special effects technician, and author
- Russ Spencer (born 1979), English television presenter and singer

== S ==
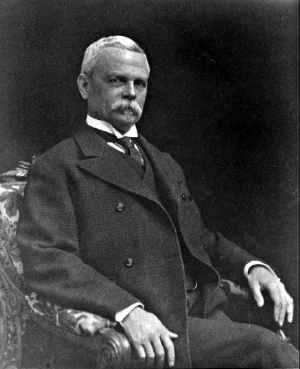
Samuel Spencer (1847–1906) was the first president of Southern Railway.

- Sam Spencer (1902–1987), English footballer
- Samuel Spencer (disambiguation), multiple people, including:
  - Samuel M. Spencer (1875–1960), politician on Hawaiʻi island
  - Samuel R. Spencer (1871–1961), American politician, Lieutenant Governor of Connecticut
  - Samuel Spencer (railroad executive) (1847–1906), American civil engineer and businessman
- S. B. Spencer (1827–1901), American politician
- Scott Spencer (disambiguation), multiple people, including:
  - Scott Spencer (writer) (born 1945), American writer
  - Scott Spencer (footballer) (born 1989), English footballer
- Sean Spencer (disambiguation), multiple people
- Selden P. Spencer (1862–1925), American politician
- Shakira Spencer (1987–2022), English murder victim
- Shane Spencer (born 1972), American baseball player
- Shawntae Spencer (born 1982), American football player
- Si Spencer, British comic book writer
- Spike Spencer (born 1968), American voice actor
- Stan Spencer (born 1968), American baseball player
- Sir Stanley Spencer (1891–1959), English painter
- Stuart Spencer (footballer) (1932–2011), Australian footballer
- Stuart Spencer (political consultant) (1927–2025), American political consultant
- Susan Tose Spencer (1941–2025), American businesswoman, lawyer, and football executive

== T ==
- Ted Spencer, American lacrosse coach
- Terry Spencer (1931–2020), English cricketer
- Terry Spencer (RAF officer) (1918–2009), British World War II fighter ace and photographer
- Thomas Spencer (disambiguation), multiple people
- Tim Spencer (American football) (born 1960), American football player
- Tom Spencer (disambiguation), multiple people, including:
  - Tom Spencer (rugby league), an English rugby league footballer
  - Tom Spencer (baseball) (born 1951), Chicago White Sox outfielder and minor league manager
  - Tom Spencer (cricketer) (1914–1995), British cricketer and international umpire
  - Tom Spencer (British politician), former Conservative Member of the European Parliament
  - Tom Spencer (musician), British singer and guitarist
- Tracie Spencer (born 1976), American R&B/pop singer–songwriter, actress, and model
- Tracy Spencer (born 1962), British Italo disco singer and actress

== U ==
- Unity Spencer (1930–2017), British artist

== V ==
- Vaino Spencer (1920–2016), American judge
- Victor Spencer (1894–1918), New Zealand soldier
- Victor Spencer, 1st Viscount Churchill (1864–1934)

== W ==
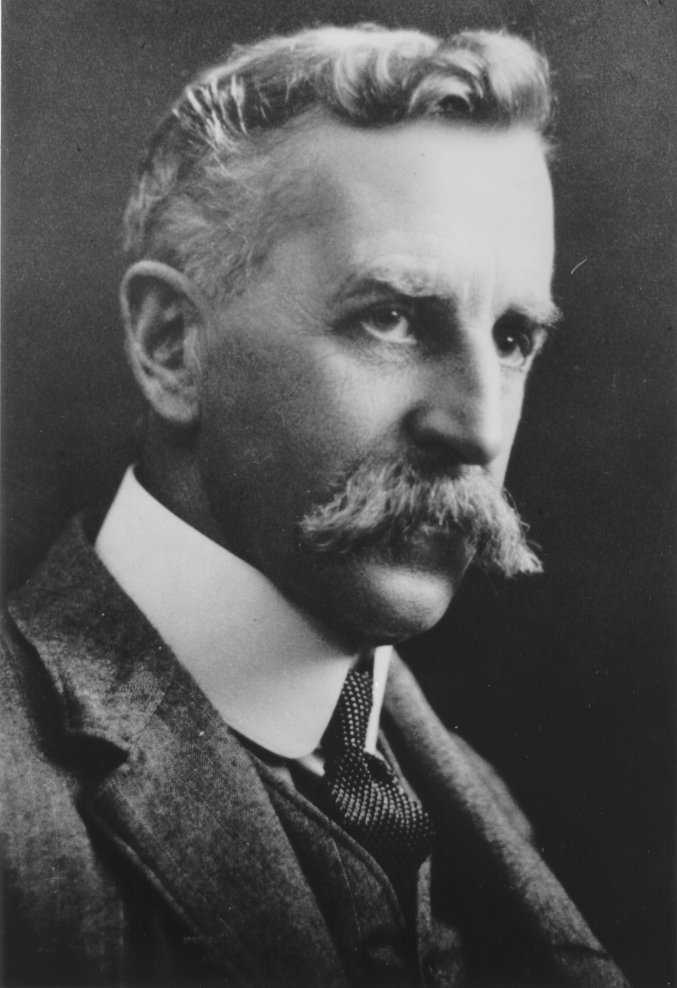
Walter Baldwin Spencer was a botanist and anthropologist.

- Sir Walter Baldwin Spencer (1860–1929), English-Australian biologist and anthropologist
- Walter Spencer (Canadian football) (born 1978), Canadian football linebacker
- Wen Spencer (born 1963), American writer
- William Spencer (disambiguation), multiple people
- Williametta Spencer (born 1927), composer

== Y ==
- Yancy Spencer III (1950–2011), American surfer

== First name unknown ==
- Spencer (baseball) (fl. 1872), American baseball player
- Spencer (Essex cricketer) (fl. 1790s), English first-class cricketer

== Families ==
- the Spencer family, including
  - The Earls Spencer
  - Winston Spencer Churchill
  - The Lady Diana Spencer (later Diana, Princess of Wales)

== Compound surname ==
These people have Spencer as part of a compound surname:

- G. Spencer-Brown, (1923–2016), English polymath
- People with the surname Spencer-Churchill
- People with the surname Spencer-Nairn
- People with the surname Spencer-Smith
- Oliver Spencer-Wortley (born 1984), English composer and songwriter

== Fictional characters ==
- Bill Spencer, from The Bold and the Beautiful
- Bill Spencer, Jr., from The Bold and the Beautiful
- Bobbie Spencer, from General Hospital
- Caroline Forrester, from The Bold and the Beautiful
- Caroline Spencer, from The Bold and the Beautiful
- Joe Spencer (Hollyoaks), from Hollyoaks
- Karen Spencer, from The Bold and the Beautiful
- Laura Spencer, from General Hospital
- Liam Spencer, from The Bold and the Beautiful
- Lucky Spencer, from General Hospital
- Luke Spencer, from General Hospital
- Lulu Spencer, from General Hospital
- Olivia Spencer, from Guiding Light
- Shawn Spencer, from Psych
- Ozwell E. Spencer, from Resident Evil
- Will Spencer, from The Bold and the Beautiful
- Wyatt Spencer, from The Bold and the Beautiful
- Kevin Spencer, title character of the show of the same name

== See also ==
- Spence (surname)
- Spencer (disambiguation)
- Spencer's (disambiguation)
- Spens (disambiguation)
- Spenser (disambiguation)
