= Spence =

Spence may refer to:

== Places ==
- Spence, Australian Capital Territory, a suburb of Canberra, Australia
- Division of Spence, a federal electoral division in Australia
- Spence, South Australia, a locality
- Spence, Ontario, Canada, a ghost town

== People ==
- Spence (surname), a list of people with the surname Spence
- Spence (given name), a list of people with the given name or nickname

== Maritime vessels ==
- HMS Spence, two ships of the Royal Navy
- USS Spence (DD-512), a World War II destroyer
- Spence (tugboat), a tugboat that sank in 2015

== Other uses ==
- Spence Diamonds, a Canadian jewelry retailer
- Spence School, a day school for girls in New York City
- Spence Air Base, Georgia, United States, a United States Air Force base from 1941 to 1961, reopened as:
  - Spence Airport, Georgia, United States, a public-use airport
- Spence Kovak, a fictional character played by Jeremy Piven

== See also ==
- Spence Shale, the middle member of the Langston Formation in southeastern Idaho and northeastern Utah, United States
- Spence Harbor, a bay of Coronation Island in the South Orkney Islands
- Spence Wing, part of the State Library of South Australia in Adelaide
- Spences Reefs, Tasmania, Australia
- Spence's Hotel, Kolkata, India, a former hotel established in 1830
- Spence's function, a mathematical function
- Spencer (disambiguation)
- Spens (disambiguation)
