= Spencer Gulf (disambiguation) =

Spencer Gulf is a gulf located in South Australia.

Spencer Gulf may also refer to.

- Spencer Gulf Football League, an Australian rules football league in South Australia
- Spencer Gulf Important Bird Area, a designation associated with part of the east coast of Spencer Gulf
- Spencer Gulf Shelf Province - a provincial bioregion listed in the Integrated Marine and Coastal Regionalisation of Australia

== See also ==
- Spencer (disambiguation)
- Eastern Spencer Gulf Marine Park, a marine protected area in Spencer Gulf
- Southern Spencer Gulf Marine Park, a marine protected area in Spencer Gulf
- Upper Spencer Gulf Marine Park, a marine protected area in Spencer Gulf
- Yatala Harbour Upper Spencer Gulf Aquatic Reserve
- George Spencer, 2nd Earl Spencer
