= David Spencer =

David Spencer may refer to:

- David A. Spencer (born 1965), American engineering professor
- David D. Spencer (1799–1855), New York editor and politician
- David E. Spencer (born 1964), professor of economics at Brigham Young University
- David W. Spencer (1837–1920), Canadian department store founder
- David William "Bill" Spencer (born 1956), American cross-country skier
- David Spencer (playwright) (born 1958), British playwright
- Ricky Valance (born David Spencer, 1936–2020), Welsh pop singer
- David Spencer (born 1963), kidnapper of Brazilian businessman Abílio dos Santos Diniz
- David Spencer (basketball coach), 2005 coach of the UC Riverside Highlanders
- David Spencer (cyclist) (born 1964), British Olympic cyclist
- David Spencer (diplomat), 1991 to 1993 High Commissioner of Australia to Canada
- David Spencer (sprinter) (born 1978), Jamaican sprinter, winner of the 2001 4 × 100 meter relay at the NCAA Division I Outdoor Track and Field Championships

== See also ==
- David Sencer (1924–2011), American public health official
- David Spencer Hardy (born 1931), on the List of South African plant botanical authors
- David Spencer Smith, 1980 to 1995 Hope Professor of Zoology at Oxford University
