= Peter Spencer =

Peter or Pete Spencer may refer to:

- Peter Spencer (religious leader) (1782–1843), American Christian leader
- Peter Spencer (journalist) (active 1970s onwards), British television news journalist
- Peter Spencer (Royal Navy officer) (born 1947), British naval officer and Chief of Defence Procurement
- Peter Spencer (footballer) (born 1956), Australian rules footballer
- Peter Spencer (farmer) (born c. 1948), Australian farmer and political activist
- Pete Spencer (born 1948), British musician in the British band Smokie
- Peter Spencer, a character in the 2020 film The Grudge

== See also ==
- List of people with surname Spencer
