= Richard Spence =

Richard Spence may refer to:

- Richard Spence (director), British film director and writer
- Richard B. Spence, American historian
- Dick Spence, English footballer

== See also ==
- Richard Spencer (disambiguation)
