= Nairn (disambiguation) =

Nairn is a town in Scotland.

Nairn may also refer to:

== Geography ==
- Nairn (Parliament of Scotland constituency), pre-1707
- Nairn, Middlesex County, Ontario, Canada, a community
- Nairn River, Chatham Islands, New Zealand
- River Nairn, Scotland
- County of Nairn, Scotland, a former county abolished in 1975, and a district of the Highland Region until 1996

== People ==
- Nairn (surname)
- Nairn MacEwan (1941–2018), Scottish rugby player and coach
- Nairn Wilson (born 1950), Scottish dentist and academic

== Other uses ==
- Nairn baronets, two titles in the Baronetage of the United Kingdom
- Nairn Transport Company, a motor transport company that operated a trans-desert route from Beirut, Haifa and Damascus to Baghdad from 1923
- Nairn Street, Fremantle, Western Australia
- Nairn Academy, a secondary school in Nairn, Scotland
- Nairn railway station, Scotland
