= Mark Spencer =

Mark Spencer may refer to:

- Mark Spencer (botanist), British forensic botanist
- Mark Spencer (computer engineer) (born 1977), American computer engineer
- Mark Spencer (guitarist) (born 1957), American guitarist
- Mark Spencer (British politician) (born 1970), British Member of Parliament for Sherwood
- Mark Spencer (New York politician) (1787–1859), New York politician
- Mark Spencer (Indiana politician)
- Mark G. Spencer (born 1967), Canadian historian
- Mark K. Spencer (born 1986), American philosopher

== See also ==
- Marks & Spencer, a major British retailer
- Spencer (surname)
