= William Spencer =

William Spencer may refer to:

== Politicians ==
- William Spencer (MP for Bristol), MP of Bristol 1467
- William Spencer (MP for Ipswich) (by 1473–1529 or later), MP for Ipswich 1510
- William Spencer (sheriff) (c.1496–1532), high sheriff of Northamptonshire 1531
- William Spencer (MP for Ripon), MP for Ripon 1584–1586
- William Spencer, 2nd Baron Spencer of Wormleighton (1591–1636), British peer and MP for Brackley 1614 and Northamptonshire 1620–22 & 1624–27
- William Spencer (MP for Bedford), MP for Bedford, 1698–1705
- William Spencer (settler) (1825–1901), early settler and MP in Western Australia
- William B. Spencer (1835–1882), U.S. representative from Louisiana
- William R. Spencer (born 1967), Suffolk County legislator, New York
- William Spencer (burgess), Virginia colonist on Jamestown Island and member of the Virginia House of Burgesses

== Fictional characters ==
- Bill Spencer Jr., a fictional character from the American soap opera The Bold and the Beautiful
- Bill Spencer Sr., a fictional character from the American soap opera The Bold and the Beautiful

== Sports ==
- William Spencer (athlete) (1900–1983), American Olympic athlete
- Billy Spencer (1903–1969), English footballer for Crewe Alexandra and Stoke City
- William Spencer (cyclist) (1895–1963), American bicycle racer
- Willie Spencer (baseball) (1914–?), American Negro leagues baseball player
- Snowy Spencer (William Jasper Gordon Spencer, 1899–1976), Australian rugby league player
- Bill Spencer (biathlete) (1936–2020), American biathlete who competed at the 1964 and 1968 Winter Olympics
- Bill Spencer (cross-country skier) (born 1956), American cross-country skier at the 1988 Winter Olympics

== Writers ==
- William Browning Spencer (born 1946), American writer
- William Robert Spencer (1769–1834), British poet

== Others ==
- William Spencer (judge) (1782–1871), American lawyer, judge, postmaster and state representative
- William Spencer (navigational instrument maker) (c.1751–c.1816), English mathematical instrument maker
- William George Spencer (1790–1866), English schoolmaster and tutor, known as a mathematical writer
- William Spencer (silent film actor) (fl. 1920s), American actor
- William J. Spencer (1867–1933), American labor leader
- William Henry Spencer (1857–1925), Afro-American educator
- William Ball Spencer (1854–1923), British marine painter
- William W. Spencer (1921–2007), American cinematographer

== See also ==
- Spencer (surname)
