= Spencerian =

Spencerian refers to

- the adjective of Spencer (surname), in particular
  - Platt Rogers Spencer (1800–64), US business school activist; in particular
    - Spencerian script, business handwriting style
    - Spencerian College, for-profit career college in Louisville and Lexington, Kentucky, USA
    - Spencerian Business College, various
  - Herbert Spencer (1820–1903) social thinker; in particular
    - Social Darwinism, application of the biological concepts of natural selection and survival of the fittest to sociology and politics

== Similar spelling ==
- Spenserian (disambiguation)
