= Anne Spencer (disambiguation) =

Anne Spencer (1882–1975) was an American poet.

Anne Spencer may also refer to:

- Ann Spencer (artist) (1918–1999), American modern artist
- Ann Hunt Spencer, American artist
- Anne Spencer, Countess of Sunderland (1683–1716)
- Anne Spencer, Countess of Sunderland (died 1715) (c. 1646–1715)
- Anne Spencer, Viscountess Bateman (1702–1769), daughter of Charles Spencer, 3rd Earl of Sunderland and Lady Anne Churchill
- Anne Spencer (WRNS officer) (1938–2012), director of the Women's Royal Naval Service
- Ann Spencer, wife of British navy captain Richard Spencer

== See also ==
- Anne Spencer House, formerly belonged to the poet
- Anna Garlin Spencer (1851–1931), American educator, feminist, and Unitarian minister
