= Kevin Spencer =

Kevin Spencer may refer to:

- Kevin Spencer (TV series), 1999–2005 Canadian animated television series
- Kevin Spencer (musician) (born 1978), Canadian singer-songwriter
- Kevin Spencer (American musician) (1955–2026), American singer-keyboardist (Dynasty)
- Kevin Spencer (American football) (born 1953), American football coach
- Kevin Spencer (cyclist), Australian cyclist
