= Spencer Township, Indiana =

Spencer Township, Indiana may refer to one of the following places:

- Spencer Township, DeKalb County, Indiana
- Spencer Township, Harrison County, Indiana
- Spencer Township, Jennings County, Indiana

See also

- Spencer Township (disambiguation)
