= Roy Spence =

Roy Spence may refer to:

- Roy Spence (executive) (born 1948), American advertising executive
- Roy Spence (filmmaker) (born 1944), Northern Irish film director

== See also ==
- Roy Spencer (disambiguation)
