= Kerry Spencer =

Kerry Spencer may refer to:

- Kerry Spencer (murderer) (born 1980), American convicted murderer
- Kerry Spencer (Emmerdale), fictional character on the television series Emmerdale

== See also ==
- List of people with surname Spencer
