= Spencer Township, Ohio =

Spencer Township, Ohio may refer to:

- Spencer Township, Allen County, Ohio
- Spencer Township, Guernsey County, Ohio
- Spencer Township, Hamilton County, Ohio (defunct)
- Spencer Township, Lucas County, Ohio
- Spencer Township, Medina County, Ohio

== See also ==
- Spencer Township (disambiguation)
