= Spenserian =

Spenserian may refer to

- the adjective of Spenser, in particular
  - Edmund Spenser (1552/3–99), English poet, in particular
    - Spenserian stanza, used in The Faerie Queen; nine lines with rhyme scheme ABABBCBCC
    - Spenserian sonnet, with rhyme scheme ABAB BCBC CDCD EE

== Similar spelling ==
- Spencerian (disambiguation)
