= Spencer Smith =

Spencer Smith may refer to:

- Spencer Smith (musician) (born 1987), American founding member and drummer of the band Panic! at the Disco
- Spencer Smith (triathlete) (born 1973), British triathlete
- Spencer Smith (Big Brother) (born 1979), contestant in Big Brother UK
- John Spencer Smith (1769–1845), British diplomat, politician and writer
- Spencer-Smith, a surname
- Spencer Smith (Playmate)
- Spencer Smith Park, in Burlington, Ontario
