= Henry Spencer (disambiguation) =

Henry Spencer is a Canadian computer programmer and space enthusiast.

Henry Spencer may also refer to:

== People ==
- Henry Spencer, 1st Earl of Sunderland (1620–1643), English nobleman and soldier
- Lord Henry Spencer (1770–1795), British diplomat and politician
- Henry Elvins Spencer (1882–1972), Canadian politician
- Henry Spencer (fl.1402), MP for Totnes
- Henry Spencer (MP for Wallingford), 15th century, see Wallingford
- Henry C. Spencer (1915–1999), American businessman
- Henry E. Spencer (1807–1882), mayor of Cincinnati

== Characters ==
- Henry Spencer, the main character from the film Eraserhead
- Henry Spencer, Shawn's father in the TV series Psych

== See also ==
- Harry Spencer (disambiguation)
