= Tom Spencer =

Tom Spencer may refer to:

- Tom Spencer (rugby league) (born 1991), English rugby league footballer
- Tom Spencer (baseball) (born 1951), American former Chicago White Sox outfielder and minor league baseball manager
- Tom Spencer (cricketer) (1914–1995), British cricketer and international umpire
- Tom Spencer (British politician) (1948–2023), British Conservative member of the European Parliament
- Tom Spencer (Florida politician) (1928–2018), American politician from Florida
- Tom Spencer (musician) (born 1967), British singer and guitarist for The Professionals and The Yo Yos

== See also ==
- Thomas Spencer (disambiguation)
