= Harrison Spencer =

Harrison Spencer may refer to:

- Harrison Spencer (dean) on List of London School of Hygiene & Tropical Medicine people
- Harrison, Spencer, township in Indiana
- Lt. Col. Harrison Spencer in 1919 Birthday Honours

== See also ==
- Harry Spencer (disambiguation)
- Harrison Spence, baseball player and manager
