= Kenneth Spencer =

Kenneth Spencer may refer to:

- Kenneth Abendana Spencer (1929–2005), Jamaican painter
- Kenneth A. Spencer (1902–1960), American philanthropist and businessman in the chemical industry
- Kenneth Spencer (singer) (1913–1964), American singer and actor
- Kenneth Spencer Stover, Canadian politician
