= Thomas Spencer =

Thomas Spencer may refer to:

- Thomas Spencer (MP for Southwark), Member of Parliament for Southwark, 1406–1415
- Thomas Spencer (priest) (died 1571), English Anglican priest
- Sir Thomas Spencer, 1st Baronet (1586–1622), of the Spencer baronets, Member of Parliament for Woodstock
- Thomas Spencer (settler) (1607–1687), early settler of Hartford, Connecticut
- Sir Thomas Spencer, 3rd Baronet (1639–1685), Member of Parliament for Woodstock
- Sir Thomas Spencer, 4th Baronet (died 1722) of the Spencer baronets
- Thomas Spencer (minister) (1791–1811), English congregationalist
- Thomas Edward Spencer (1845–1911), Australian writer
- Thomas Spencer (cricketer) (1850–1933), English cricketer
- Thomas Spencer (businessman) (1852–1905), cashier, co-founder of Marks & Spencer
- Thomas Alfred Spencer (1860–1937), member of the Queensland Legislative Assembly
- Sir Thomas Spencer (1882–1976), British managing director of Standard Telephones and Cables (1932-1957)
- Tom Spencer (Florida politician) (born 1928), American politician
- Thomas Spencer (mathematical physicist) (born 1946), American mathematical physicist
- Thomas F. Spencer (b. 1964), U.S. Army major general

== See also ==
- Tommy Spencer (born 1945), Scottish footballer
- Tom Spencer (disambiguation)
