= Harold Spencer =

Harold Spencer may refer to:

- Harold Spencer (footballer) (1919–2003), English footballer
- Harold Sherwood Spencer (1890–?), American-born British anti-homosexuality and antisemitic activist
- Harold E.P. Spencer, Suffolk geologist employed at Ipswich Museum

== See also ==
- Harry Spencer (disambiguation)
