= Spencer-Nairn =

Spencer-Nairn is a British double-barrelled surname. Notable people with the surname include:

- Douglas Spencer-Nairn (1906–1970), Scottish politician
- Tara Spencer-Nairn (born 1978), Canadian actress
- Spencer-Nairn baronets

== See also ==
- List of people with surname Spencer
- Nairn (surname)
