= Spencer's =

Spencer's may refer to:

- Spencer's (department store), a defunct department store chain in British Columbia, Canada
- Spencer's Gifts, a North American retail chain
- Spencer Plaza in Chennai, India
- Spencer's Retail, a retail chain in India

== See also ==
- Spencer (disambiguation)
