= Chris Spence =

Chris Spence may refer to:

- Chris Spence (educator) (born 1962), Canadian educator, author, and former football player
- Chris Spence (journalist) (born 1970), New Zealand researcher into climate change
- Chris Spence (politician) (born 1975), Australian politician with the One Nation and Liberal parties

== See also ==
- Christopher Spencer (disambiguation)
