= Samuel Spencer =

Samuel Spencer may refer to:

- Samuel Spencer (North Carolina politician) (1734–1794), North Carolina judge, lawyer, and Revolutionary War colonel
- Samuel M. Spencer (1875–1960), politician on Hawaiʻi island
- Samuel R. Spencer (1871–1961), American politician, lieutenant governor of Connecticut
- Samuel Spencer (railroad executive) (1847–1906), first president of the Southern Railway
- S. B. Spencer (1827–1901), mayor of Atlanta, Georgia
- Sam Spencer (1902–1987), English footballer
- Samuel Reid Spencer Jr. (1919–2013), president of Davidson College
- Samuel A. Spencer, American politician in the Virginia House of Delegates
- Samuel Spencer (DC commissioner) (1910–1997), president of the District of Columbia Board of Commissioners
