= Spencer-Smith =

Disambiguation page

Spencer-Smith is a British double-barrelled surname. Notable people with the surname include:

- Arnold Spencer-Smith (1883–1916), English clergyman and member of Ernest Shackleton's Imperial Trans-Antarctic Expedition
- Joshua Spencer-Smith (1843–1928), English cricketer, twin brother of Orlando Spencer-Smith
- Lauren Spencer-Smith (born 2003), British-born Canadian singer-songwriter
- Orlando Spencer-Smith (1843–1920), English cricketer, twin brother of Joshua Spencer-Smith

== See also ==
- Spencer Smith (disambiguation)
- List of people with surname Spencer
- List of people with surname Smith
