= Robert Despenser =

11th-century Norman nobleman and royal official in England

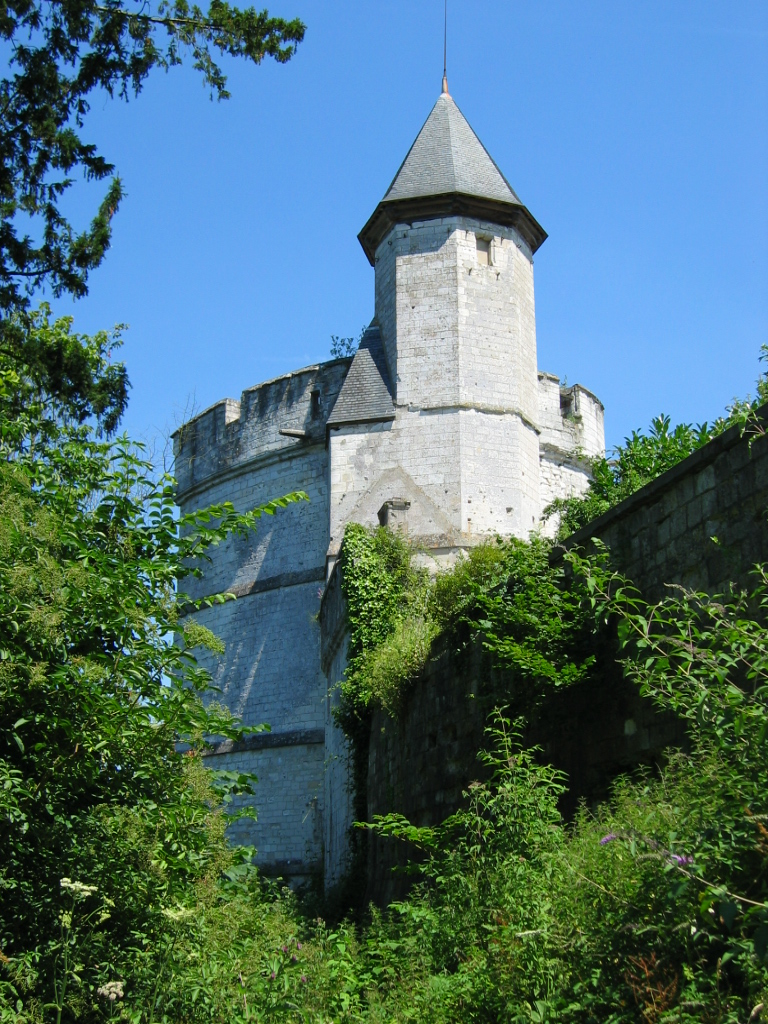
- The Château de Tancarville in Normandy. Despenser was a tenant of the lords of Tancarville.

Royal steward
- In office c. 1088 – c. 1098
- Preceded by: none

Personal details
- Born: unknown – before 1066 Normandy
- Died: c. 1098 England

Robert Despenser (sometimes Robert Despensator, Robert Dispenser, or Robert fitzThurstin; died after 1098) was a Norman officeholder and landholder in post-Conquest medieval England.

== Career ==
Despenser was the brother of Urse d'Abetot, who was sheriff of Worcestershire shortly after the Conquest. Despenser and his brother were originally from Normandy, and were tenants of the lords of Tancarville there. Despenser held the office of royal steward, or dispenser, under King William II. Despenser's surname derived from his office. (Note: The office is the origin of the Spencer surname.) Although Despenser was married, the name of his wife is not known for sure. He may be the Robert de Abitot referred to in a confirmation charter of King Stephen of England's, but this identification is not certain.

In 1086, Despenser was listed in Domesday Book as holding lands as a tenant-in-chief in Gloucestershire, Leicestershire, Lincolnshire, Oxfordshire, and Warwickshire, as well as holding lands in Worcestershire from the Bishop of Worcester.

Robert was still alive in 1098, as he restored some estates to Westminster Abbey, but likely died shortly thereafter. In Normandy, Robert was a benefactor to the Priory of St. Barbe-en-Auge, which had been founded by the Tancarville lords.

== Legacy ==
Despenser appears to have had no legitimate male children, as his heir was his brother Urse. He may have had a daughter, as some of his lands were inherited by the Marmion family, but it is also possible that they acquired the lands via marriage with a daughter of Urse. Despenser's office as steward may also have gone to Urse, as later the office passed to Urse's heirs. The medieval writer Orderic Vitalis states that it was Despenser who gave Ranulf Flambard his surname of Flambard, which means torch-bearer or incendiary. This was applied to Flambard because of his overwhelming personality.

== Sources ==
- Barlow, Frank (1983). William Rufus. Berkeley, CA: University of California Press. ISBN 0-520-04936-5.
- Keats-Rohan, K. S. B. (1999). Domesday People: A Prosopography of Persons Occurring in English Documents, 1066–1166: Domesday Book. Ipswich, UK: Boydell Press. ISBN 0-85115-722-X.
- Mason, Emma (2005). William II: Rufus, the Red King. Stroud, UK: Tempus. ISBN 0-7524-3528-0.
- Newman, Charlotte A. (1988). The Anglo-Norman Nobility in the Reign of Henry I: The Second Generation. Philadelphia, PA: University of Pennsylvania Press. ISBN 0-8122-8138-1.
- Reaney, Percy H. & Wilson, Richard M. (2005). Oxford Dictionary of English Surnames (Third ed.). Oxford, UK: Oxford University Press. ISBN 978-0-19-280663-5.
- Round, J. H. (2004). "Abetot, Urse d' (c.1040–1108)". Oxford Dictionary of National Biography. revised by Emma Mason. Oxford University Press. doi:10.1093/ref:odnb/28022. (subscription, Wikipedia Library access or UK public library membership required)
