= Jane Spencer =

Jane Spencer may refer to:

- Jane Spencer (journalist), American journalist
- Jane Spencer (director), American film director
- Jane Spencer, Baroness Churchill (1826–1900), English peeress
