= Jeremy Spencer (disambiguation) =

Jeremy Spencer (born 1948) is an English musician.

Jeremy Spencer may also refer to:

- Jeremy Spencer (album), a 1970 album by the aforementioned musician
  - Jeremy Spencer and the Children (1972), his second album
- Jeremy Spencer (drummer) (born 1973), American heavy-metal musician current lead singer of groove/death metal band Semi-Rotted and former drummer of Five Finger Death Punch
- Jeremy P. E. Spencer, British biochemist
- Jeremy Spencer (rugby union) (born 1939), English rugby union player

== See also ==
- Jeremy Spenser, British actor
