= Danielle Spencer =

Danielle Spencer may refer to:

- Danielle Spencer (American actress) (1965-2025), African-American actress
- Danielle Spencer (Australian actress) (born 1969), Australian songwriter, recording artist and actress

== See also ==
- Daniel Spencer (disambiguation)
- Spencer (surname)
