= HMS Spencer =

Two ships of the Royal Navy have borne the name HMS Spencer. A third was renamed before being launched:

- HMS Spencer was to have been an 18-gun brig sloop. She was renamed Diligence before being launched in 1795.
- HMS Spencer (1795) was a 16-gun brig-sloop, formerly the civilian Sir Charles Grey. She was purchased in 1795, renamed HMS Lilly (or Lily) in 1800, and captured by the French in 1804. She became the French privateer Général Ernouf. She blew up in 1805 while in an engagement with HMS Renard.
- HMS Spencer (1800) was a 74-gun third rate launched in 1800 and broken up in 1822.

== Other ==
Although a website identifies an HMS Spencer as being wrecked near Falmouth in 1754, neither Colledge & Warlow, nor Hepper, have any trace of this vessel or wreck. She may have been a merchant rather than a naval vessel.

== See also ==
- HMS Spenser
- HMS Spence
