= Edward Spencer =

Edward Spencer may refer to:

- Edward Spencer (athlete) (1881–1965), British race walker
- John Spencer, 8th Earl Spencer (Edward John Spencer, 1924–1992), British peer, father of Diana, Princess of Wales
- Edward Spencer (English politician) (1594–1656), English politician who sat in the House of Commons at various times between 1621 and 1648
- Edward Spencer (Canadian politician) (1893–1973), civil engineer and politician in Newfoundland
- Edward Spencer (rugby union) (1876–1931), Scottish rugby player
- Tubby Spencer (Edward Russell Spencer, 1884–1945), American baseball player

== See also ==
- Ted Spencer, lacrosse coach
