= Samuel A. Spencer =

American politician

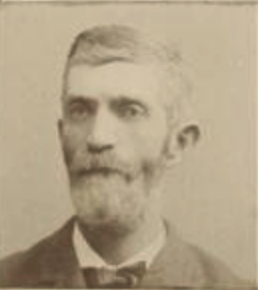

Member of the Virginia House of Delegates from Buckingham County
- In office December 2, 1891 – December 6, 1893
- Preceded by: Langdon C. Moseley
- Succeeded by: Camm Patteson

Personal details
- Born: Samuel Ayres Spencer
- Died: March 21, 1904
- Party: Democratic

Samuel Ayres Spencer (died March 21, 1904) was an American politician who served in the Virginia House of Delegates.
