= Henry Spencer (fl. 1402) =

English politician

Henry Spencer (fl. 1402) was an English politician.

He was a member (MP) of the parliament of England for Totnes in 1402.
