= HMS Spence =

Two ships of the Royal Navy have borne the name HMS Spence:

- HMS Spence (1722) was an 8-gun sloop launched in 1722 and broken up in 1730.
- HMS Spence (1730) was a 12-gun sloop launched in 1730 and sold in 1748.

== See also ==
- HMS Spencer
