= David E. Spencer =

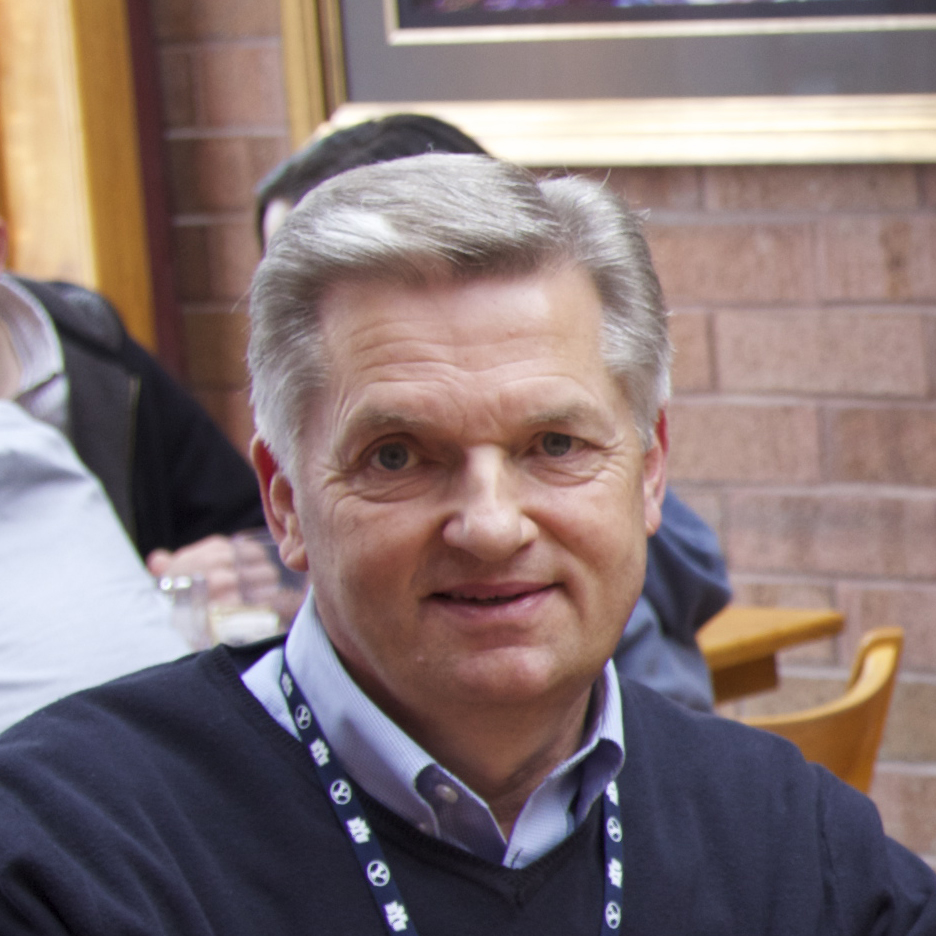
David E. Spencer

David E. Spencer is a retired professor of economics at Brigham Young University. He taught and did research in macroeconomics, econometrics, and monetary theory. He is the author of eighteen peer-reviewed publications, including Econometrica, the American Economic Review, the Review of Economics and Statistics and the Journal of Money, Credit and Banking. Spencer is a founding member of the BYU Macroeconomics and Computational Lab. In addition to teaching various economics classes, Spencer also taught American Heritage at BYU for several years.

Spencer's academic work has focused on econometric testing of macroeconomic theory. In particular, he has made important contributions to the understanding of the behavior of nominal and real wages over the course of the business cycle. He has made contributions to the literature on structural VAR estimation in this context.

David Spencer has taught at BYU since 1986. He received his Ph.D. in economics from Texas A & M University in 1974. He was a visiting professor at Michigan State University during the 1974–75 academic year. From 1975 through 1979 he taught at Illinois State University. He was at Washington State University from 1979 to 1986. He was tenured there in 1981. In 1986 he moved to BYU and became a full professor in 1991. He was a visiting scholar at M.I.T. (1988–89) and a visiting professor at the University of Michigan (2007–08). He was also a Fulbright Scholar in Vietnam in 1997.

Spencer and coauthor Jo Anna Gray received the Best Article Award at Economic Inquiry in 1990 for their paper, "Price Prediction Errors and Real Activity: A Reassessment."

David Spencer has served as a committee member overseeing the Graduate Record Examination (GRE) Economics Exam from 1994 to 2001 and was chair of the committee from 1998 to 2001, when the exam was discontinued. He received a major award at BYU in 2005, the Alcuin Fellowship, and was an Alcuin fellow 2005–2008.

Spencer is one of the founders (along with Richard W. Evans and Kerk L. Phillips) of the BYU Macroeconomics and Computational Lab.
