= Ann Hunt Spencer =

American artist

Ann Spencer Pratt
- Born: Ann Hunt Spencer; 1913; Toronto, Ontario, Canada
- Died: December 31, 1972 (aged 59); Canaan, Connecticut
- Known for: muralist
- Spouse: Lawrence S. Pratt

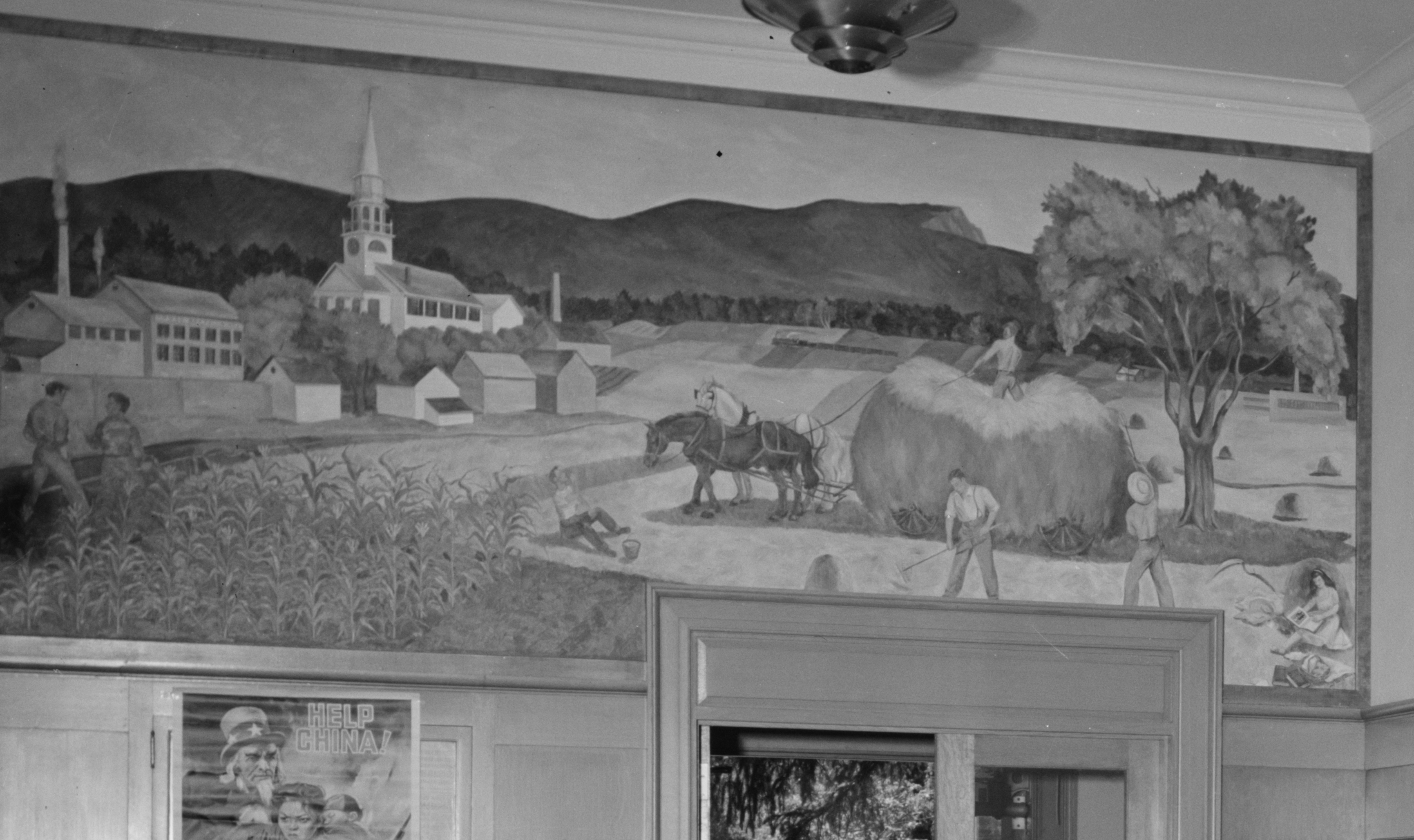
Southington, Connecticut. Southington's U.S. Post Office with the mural Romance of Southington

Ann Hunt Spencer Pratt (1913–1972) was an American painter. She is best known for her New Deal era mural in the Southington, Connecticut Post Office.

== Biography ==
Pratt née Spencer was born in 1913 in Toronto, Ontario, Canada. She attended Sarah Lawrence College and studied at the National Academy of Design. In 1940 she married Lawrence S. Pratt. The couple later divorced.

In 1942 Pratt painted the mural Romance of Southington for the Southington, Connecticut Post Office.The mural was funded by the Treasury Section of Fine Arts (TSFA). She exhibited her work at the Berkshire Museum, the Corcoran Gallery of Art, and the National Academy of Design.

Pratt, who had deep red hair, was friends with many artists and often the subject of paintings by them, sitting for example for portraits by Jerry Farnsworth and the author and painter Barbara Comfort. A portrait of her as a 12-year-old girl by Helen Maria Turner sold at auction in 2021 for $40,000.

She died on December 31, 1972, of complications from an aneurysm in Canaan, Connecticut.
