= Mark K. Spencer =

American philosophy professor (born 1986)

- Born: March 14, 1986 (age 40); Ypsilanti, Michigan, U.S.

Education
- Education: University at Buffalo (PhD), Franciscan University of Steubenville (BA, MA)
- Thesis: Thomistic Hylomorphism and the Phenomenology of Self-Sensing (2012)
- Doctoral advisor: Jorge J.E. Gracia
- Other advisors: Richard Cohen, David Hershenov

Philosophical work
- Era: 21st-century philosophy
- Region: Western philosophy
- Institutions: University of St. Thomas (Minnesota)

Mark Kenneth Spencer (born March 14, 1986) is an American philosopher and Professor of Philosophy at University of St. Thomas, St. Paul, known for his work on medieval and scholastic philosophy, personalism and phenomenology, philosophical anthropology, natural theology, and aesthetics.

== Books ==
- Catholicism and the Problem of God, Elements in the Problems of God Series, (Cambridge: Cambridge University Press, 2023). 66 pages.
- The Irreducibility of the Human Person: A Catholic Synthesis (Washington: The Catholic University of America Press, 2022). 454 + xviii pages.
