= Scott Spencer =

Scott Spencer may refer to:

- Scott Spencer (writer) (born 1945), American writer
- Scott Spencer (footballer) (born 1989), English footballer
