= Spencer Gulf Important Bird Area =

Important Bird Area in South Australia

Coordinates: 33°18′11″S 137°53′40″E

Location of the Spencer Gulf Important Bird Area in South Australia

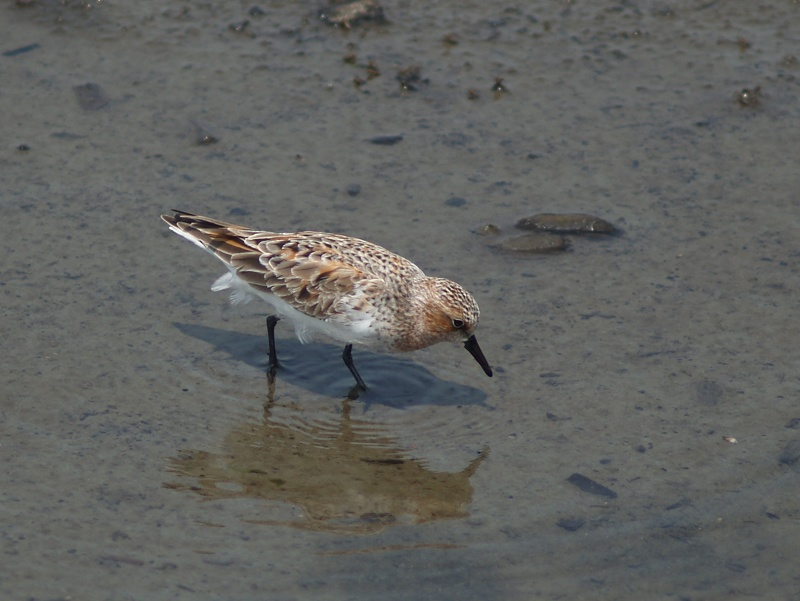
The IBA is an important site for red-necked stints.

The Spencer Gulf Important Bird Area comprises a 460.38 square kilometres (177.75 square miles) strip of coastal land extending for about 100 kilometres (62 miles) along the north-eastern coast of the Spencer Gulf in South Australia. It is considered to be an important site for waders, or shorebirds.

== Description ==
The Important Bird Area (IBA) extends from Tickera Point (also called Myponie Point) immediately north of Wallaroo in the south to Ward Point immediately west of Port Germein in the north. It also passes close to Port Broughton, and the industrial city of Port Pirie. About 190.00 square kilometres (73.36 square miles), or over 40%, of the IBA consists of intertidal sand and mudflats used by waders as feeding habitat. There are also extensive areas of mangroves and salt marshes.

== Criteria for nomination as an IBA ==
The site has been identified by BirdLife International as an IBA because it supports over 1% of the world population of red-necked stints. Other waders and waterbirds sometimes recorded in significant numbers include red knots, sharp-tailed sandpipers, banded stilts, pied oystercatchers, Australian shovelers and fairy terns. Chirruping wedgebills and rock parrots have been recorded. A single sighting of an orange-bellied parrot was made in 1992.

== Associated protected areas ==
While the IBA has no statutory status, it does overlap the following protected area declared by the South Australian government - Heritage Agreement No. HA1096, an allotment of privately owned land sized at 7.58 square kilometres (2.93 square miles).

== See also ==
- List of birds of South Australia
