= Nairn (surname) =

Nairn is a surname. Notable people with the surname include:

- Allan Nairn (b. 1956), American investigative journalist
- Gary Nairn (1951–2024), former Australian politician
- Ian Nairn (1930–1983), British architectural critic
- James Nairn (1859–1904), Scottish painter
- Kristian Nairn (b. 1975), an actor and disc jockey
- Mitzi Nairn (1942–2023), New Zealand advocate for women's rights
- Nick Nairn (b. 1959), Scottish celebrity chef
- Rob Nairn, South African Buddhist teacher and author
- Thomas McIntyre Nairn (1830–1888), Ontario businessman and political figure
- Tom Nairn (1932–2023), Scottish theorist of nationalism
- Walter Nairn (1878–1958), Australian politician
- Norman Nairn (1894–1968) and his brother Gerald (1897–1980); see Nairn Transport Company

== See also ==
- Nairn (fictional character), fictional character from the Sharpe series of novels
- Nairn, Scotland
- Nairn Baronets
- Spencer-Nairn
