= Jeremy P. E. Spencer =

British biochemist

- Education: University of Warwick; King's College London
- Scientific career
- Fields: Biochemistry, nutrition, cognition, Alzheimer's disease, phytochemicals
- Workplaces: University of Reading; King's College London; UC Davis
- Doctoral advisor: Professor Barry Halliwell

Jeremy P. E. Spencer is a British biochemist, specialising in nutrition and cognitive function. He is Professor of Molecular Nutrition at the Department of Food and Nutritional Sciences of the University of Reading. He is an Institute for Scientific Information highly-cited researcher.

== Biography ==
Spencer studied Biochemistry at the University of Warwick and completed his PhD in Medical Biochemistry/Pharmacology at King's College London. Following several years as postdoctoral research fellow, at UC Davis and King's College London, he became a lecturer in Biochemistry at the King's College London GKT School of Medical Education. Since 2004, he is at the Department of Food and Nutritional Sciences at the University of Reading. He has received numerous awards, including the Silver Medal of the British Nutrition Society.

== Research ==
Spencer's research is focused on the interface between dietary phytochemicals and brain function. His initial work focused on the cellular and molecular mechanisms underlying neuronal death in Parkinson's disease and Alzheimer's disease. He could show that flavonoids and other polyphenols act as signalling molecules and not antioxidants in vivo.
