= Daniel Spencer =

Daniel Spencer may refer to:

- Daniel Spencer (Mormon) (1794–1868), mayor of Nauvoo, Illinois and Mormon pioneer
- Daniel Spencer (environmentalist), South Australian climate activist
- Danny Spencer, guitarist with Rogue Traders
- Dan Spencer (born 1965), American baseball coach
- Dan Spencer (Emmerdale), a fictional character on ITV soap opera Emmerdale

== See also ==
- Danielle Spencer (disambiguation)
