= James Spencer =

James, Jim or Jimmy Spencer may refer to:

== Politics and law ==
- James Spencer, lord mayor of London in 1527
- James B. Spencer (1781–1848), U.S. representative from New York
- James G. Spencer (1844–1926), U.S. representative from Mississippi
- James Spencer (South Dakota judge) (c. 1844–1901), justice of the Dakota Territorial Supreme Court
- Sir Ernest Spencer (James Ernest Spencer, 1848–1937), British member of parliament
- James A. Spencer (1850–1911), member of the South Carolina House of Representatives
- James R. Spencer (born 1949), U.S. district judge

== Sports ==
- Jim Spencer (American football) (1901–1961), American football player
- James Spencer (cross-country skier) (born 1936), British Olympic skier
- Jim Spencer (1946–2002), American baseball player
- Jim Spencer (curler) (fl. 1980–2002), Canadian curler
- Jimmy Spencer (born 1957), American racing driver
- Jimmy Spencer (American football) (born 1969), American football player
- Jamie Spencer (born 1980), Irish flat racing jockey
- James Spencer (footballer, born 1985), English footballer
- Jimmy Spencer (footballer) (born 1991), English footballer

== Other people ==
- Jimmy O'Neal Spencer (born 1965), American convicted murderer and criminal
- Jim Spencer (businessman), American media entrepreneur

== See also ==
- James Spencer-Churchill, 12th Duke of Marlborough (born 1955), English peer
