= Elizabeth Spencer =

Elizabeth Spencer may refer to:

- Elizabeth Spencer (writer) (1921–2019), American novelist
- Elizabeth Spencer (soprano) (1871–1935), American soprano, recording artist for Thomas Alva Edison
- Lady Elizabeth Spencer (1737–1831), wife of Henry Herbert, 10th Earl of Pembroke
- Elizabeth Spencer, Baroness Hunsdon (1552–1618), English noblewoman, scholar, and patron of the arts
- Elizabeth Spencer, Duchess of Marlborough (c. 1713–1761)

== Characters ==
- Elizabeth Webber, fictional character on the American soap opera General Hospital -- at one time married to Lucky Spencer
- Betty Spencer, fictional character in Some Mothers Do 'Ave 'Em
