= Chris Spencer =

Christopher or Chris Spencer may refer to:

- Christopher Miner Spencer (1833–1922), American inventor
- Chris Spencer (actor), African-American actor, comedian, writer and producer
- Chris Spencer (musician), American noise rock musician, leader of the band Unsane
- Chris Spencer (arena football) (born 1970), American football player
- Chris Spencer (center) (born 1982), American football player
- Cold War Steve, British collage artist and satirist, born Christopher Spencer

== See also ==
- Chris Spence (disambiguation)
