= William R. Spencer =

American county legislator and physician

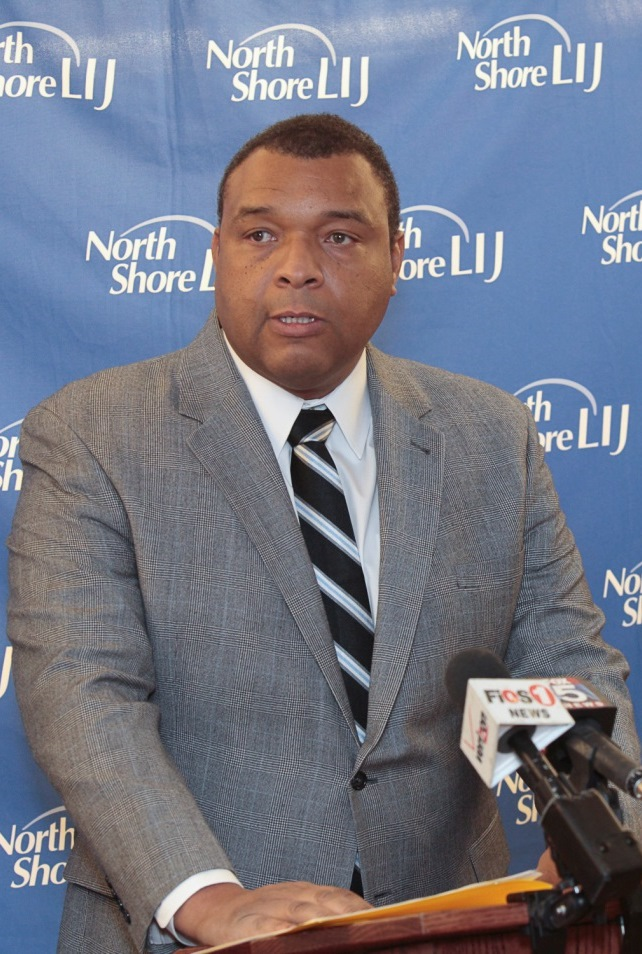
- Suffolk County Legislator William R. Spencer, M.D. speaks a press conference in February of 2015

Legislator, 18th District of Suffolk County
- In office January 2012 – December 31, 2021
- Succeeded by: Stephanie Bontempi

Personal details
- Born: William R. Spencer, Jr. June 12, 1967 (age 59) Welch, West Virginia
- Party: Democratic
- Spouse: Rachel
- Children: 3
- Education: Wesleyan University; University of Connecticut School Of Medicine; St. Vincent’s Hospital and Medical Center; New York Eye and Ear Infirmary; University of Miami; Connecticut Missionary Baptist Association
- Profession: Physician Specializing in Otolaryngology

William R. "Doc" Spencer (born June 12, 1967) is a former county legislator and physician in Suffolk County, New York. He represented the 18th Legislative District, which comprises the communities Asharoken, Cold Spring Harbor, Centerport, Eaton's Neck, Greenlawn, Halesite, Huntington Bay, Huntington, Lloyd Harbor, and Northport. Additionally, the district included portions of Huntington Station and East Northport. In November 2021, Spencer was charged by the Suffolk County District Attorney's office with 9 counts, including 7 felonies. Later all felonies were dismissed against Spencer in the interest of justice as recommended by the DA. Public records of disposition of case on Oct 16, 2023 Docket # IND-70410-21/001 Suffolk County Court. and confirmed by associated transcript with disposition.

== Education ==
William R. Spencer was raised in Welch, West Virginia. He is the son of Rev. William R. Spencer, Sr and the late Kay Spencer of Welch WV. After graduating from Mount View High School in Welch, WV, he received his B.A. from Wesleyan University in 1989 and his M.D. from the University of Connecticut School Of Medicine in 1993. After completing medical school, he moved on to complete his internship and residency at St. Vincent’s Hospital and Medical Center in New York City, his residency in otolaryngology at the New York Eye and Ear Infirmary, and his fellowship in pediatric otolaryngology at the University of Miami. In 1986, William R. Spencer was licensed as a Minister, and went on to be ordained in ministry by the Connecticut Missionary Baptist Association in 1993.

== Medical career ==
In 1997, Dr. William R. Spencer began his affiliation with NorthShore LIJ (now Northwell Health), Huntington Hospital, where he also served as Chief of Otolaryngology. In 2000, he opened his own private medical practice in Huntington, NY.

Dr. Spencer is the past president of the Suffolk County Medical Society, was an Officer of the American Medical Association, and a Diplomate of the American Board of Otolaryngology, as well as the National Board of Medical Examiners. Additionally, he is a Fellow of the American Academy of Pediatrics and The American Academy of Otolaryngology Head and Surgery.

== Legislative career ==
In November 2011, William R. Spencer won his first term as Suffolk County Legislator of the 18th Legislative District, and was re-elected for additional terms in 2013, 2015, 2017 and 2019. As the first physician to serve on the legislature, maintaining public health and crafting science-based public policy was a main focus for Legislator Spencer.

As a member of the Suffolk County Legislature, he served as Chair of the Health Committee, Vice Chair of the Ways & Means Committee, and as a member of the Public Safety Committee.

=== Key Legislation ===
==== Water quality and aquifer protection ====
During his first term, Legislator Spencer was able to secure more than $4,500,000 in funding to upgrade Northport’s Sewage Treatment Plant.

Legislator Spencer was the lead sponsor in Suffolk County for IR 1565-2013, which created the Long Island Commission on Aquifer Protection (LICAP) a joint initiative between Nassau and Suffolk Counties to protect Long Island’s sole-source aquifer.

In 2014, Legislator Spencer introduced and passed legislation to further strengthen Suffolk County laws protecting residents from the dangers of hydraulic fracturing waste. IR 1117-2014 prohibits the introduction of hydro-fracking waste into all waste water treatment facilities in the county, prohibits the sale of hydro-fracking waste in Suffolk, and prohibits the application of such waste on all roadways and properties in Suffolk.

==== Energy drinks ====
In March 2013, Legislator Spencer passed the first in the nation comprehensive energy drink action plan. This three part plan, which aims to protect Suffolk County's youth from the dangers of caffeine toxicity associated with energy drinks, prohibits direct marketing of energy drinks to minors, prohibits the sale and distribution of energy drinks to minors in county parks, and created "The Truth about Stimulant Drinks" public education campaign and PSA contest.

Since Legislator Spencer's legislation passed, this topic has gained increased advocacy and national attention. The guidelines and restrictions enacted by Suffolk County have been adopted as recommendations by the Suffolk County Medical Society, the New York State Medical Society, and the American Medical Association.

In July 2013, Legislator Spencer was invited to testify at the United States Senate Commerce Committee by Senator Jay Rockefeller of West Virginia, to discuss his insights on the dangers of energy drink consumption and marketing.

In April 2014, he was invited to present as a guest lecturer at the Yale Rudd Center for Food Policy & Obesity at Yale University to discuss his experience with the powerful energy drink lobby, and how to develop and garner support for effective public health policy.

==== Tobacco 21 ====
In 2014, Suffolk County joined the growing list of municipalities across the nation passing laws to increase the tobacco purchasing age in Suffolk County to 21. IR 1039-2014, sponsored by Legislator Spencer, prohibits the sale of all traditional and non-traditional tobacco products to individuals under 21. Such products include cigarettes, chewing tobacco, e-cigarettes, liquid nicotine, rolling papers, and smoking apparatuses.

==== Powdered caffeine ====
In late 2014, Legislator Spencer co-sponsored a resolution with his colleague, Presiding Officer DuWayne Gregory to ban the sale of powdered caffeine to minors in Suffolk County. The highly potent substance, which is nearly 100% caffeine, has been linked to at least 2 deaths in the United States. After the passage of the legislation, Dr. Spencer joined a group of advocates to meet with the FDA and five US Senators and discuss the dangers posed by powdered caffeine products. Since the delegation, the FDA has taken action against the five distributors, warning them that product as labeled is hazardous and that appropriate measures must be taken to clarify safe dosage.

==== Reduction of single use plastic bags ====
In 2016, Legislator Spencer led the way in reducing the consumption of single-use carry out bags in Suffolk County, NY. During the time he was working on the legislation, the vast majority of the nearly 1 trillion single-use carry out bags consumed every year worldwide, were not recycled and only used for an average of 12 minutes. The bags litter roads, become stuck in storm drains, pollute waterways and harm and kill marine and wildlife. After receiving bipartisan support from the Suffolk County Legislature, the law went into effect in January 2018. In the first 6 months, the legislation successfully reduced single-use carry-out bags by 80% through enacting a 5 cent fee on carry-out bags; incentivizing shoppers to BYOB (bring your own bag).

==== Food allergy awareness ====
With 15 million Americans affected by food allergies, and nearly half of all fatal reactions being caused by foods purchased outside the home, Legislator Spencer partnered with local families to pass a law to improve allergy safety and awareness at restaurants in Suffolk County. The Suffolk County “Food Allergy Friendly Program” requires food service establishments to include a notice on all menus asking patrons to inform their server of any food allergies prior to placing their order. In addition to the mandatory requirement, the bill invites restaurants to voluntarily take further safety measures, in order to hold the designation “Food Allergy Friendly”. Those measures include: displaying extra signage in the staff area, having a manager certified in food allergen safety on duty at all times, and maintaining an ingredient list for all food items available on site which can be available for diners upon request.

== Arrest/and dismissal ==
On October 20, 2020, Spencer was arrested on 2 Felony counts. The final disposition of the case were that all felony charges were dismissed against Spencer in the interest of justice as recommended by the DA. Public records of the disposition of case on Oct 16, 2023 evidenced by Docket # IND-70410-21/001 of Suffolk County Court and associated transcript with disposition. Spencer went through the criminal justice system and alleged illegal drug exchange were dismissed. Although the charges were dismissed the salacious media coverage damaged Spencer's reputation in the court of public opinion temporarily halted Spencer's political and public service.
