= Harry Spencer =

Harry Spencer may refer to:

- Harry Spencer (cricketer, born 1868) (1868–1937), English cricketer for Derbyshire
- Harry Spencer (cricketer, born 1901) (1901–1954), English cricketer for Worcestershire and for Warwickshire
- Harry Spencer (footballer) (1897–1942), New Zealand international football (soccer) player
- Harry Spencer (rugby union) (born 1988), rugby union player

== See also ==
- Henry Spencer (disambiguation)
- Harold Spencer (disambiguation)
- Harrison Spencer (disambiguation)
