= Glenn Spencer =

Glenn Spencer may refer to:

- Glenn Spencer (American football), American college football coach
- Glenn Spencer (baseball), Major League Baseball pitcher
