= Oliver Spencer-Wortley =

- Born: 6 December 1984 (age 40)
- Origin: Castle Gresley, Derbyshire, England
- Genres: Classical; Orchestral
- Occupation(s): Composer, songwriter, music arranger, orchestrator, record label executive
- Years active: 2006–present
- Labels: Cove Records, Music Sales Group (Publishers)
- Website: www.cove-music.com www.thomasofficial.com

Oliver Spencer-Wortley also known as Oliver Spencer (born 6 December 1984) is an English composer and songwriter. He is the brother of classical crossover tenor, Thomas Spencer-Wortley.

== Background ==
Spencer-Wortley studied composition at the Royal Academy of Music and Trinity College of Music. In June 2011, he signed a global publishing deal with Music Sales Group. He is also a director at the independent record label, Cove Records. He helped arrange his brother's album for him, and is said to be responsible for the creativity of it.

== Work ==
Prolific as a composer and arranger, his most famous arrangement is the Monday Night Football theme for ESPN which was recorded in Abbey Road Studios. He has written for many brands including the NFL, NBA, Microsoft, M&M's, Nascar, Detroit Pistons, National Geographic, Discovery Channel, documentaries including Lincoln's Last Day, The Real Mad Men of Advertising, The Spy in the Hanoi Hilton; and for programs such as Netflix's Buddy Thunderstruck, BBC's Special Forces:Ultimate Hell Week and CBeebies Tinpo. Additional arrangements have featured in The Flash, Sleepy Hollow and Man in the High Castle. He extensively works for APM Music in the United States.

He recently did an orchestral arrangement of "Two Less Lonely People in the World" for Air Supply's album, Lost in Love Experience, and "Somebody to Love" for violinist Assia Ahhatt. He has programmed on albums including Il Volo's Buon Natale: The Christmas Album and Celine Dion's Encore un Soir.

He has a large catalogue of music in libraries such as KPM, APM Music, Universal Music, Sonoton and Hitpoint.

As part of the Spencer Brothers, he co-produced his brother's album (Thomas Spencer - The Journey) with Grammy Award record producer Humberto Gatica at Lionshare Studios, Los Angeles. The Spencer Brothers run Cove Music, an independent music company specializing in album production and artist development. They primarily work on projects with long time David Foster engineer and mixer, Jorge Vivo.
