= Spencer =

Spencer may refer to:

== People ==
- Spencer (surname)
  - Spencer family, British aristocratic family
  - List of people with surname Spencer
- Spencer (given name), a given name (including a list of people with the name)

== Places ==
=== Australia ===
- Spencer, New South Wales, on the Central Coast
- Spencer Gulf, one of two inlets on the South Australian coast

=== United States ===
- Spencer, Idaho
- Spencer, Indiana
- Spencer, Iowa
- Spencer, Massachusetts
  - Spencer (CDP), Massachusetts
- Spencer, Missouri
- Spencer, Nebraska
- Spencer, New York
  - Spencer (village), New York
- Spencer, North Carolina
- Spencer, Ohio
- Spencer, Oklahoma
- Spencer, South Dakota
- Spencer, Tennessee
- Spencer, Virginia
- Spencer, West Virginia
- Spencer, Wisconsin
  - Spencer (town), Wisconsin
- Spencer County, Indiana
- Spencer County, Kentucky

=== Ireland ===
- Spencer Dock, North Wall, Dublin

== Arts and entertainment ==
=== Fictional characters ===
- Spencer, character in Beyblade
- Spencer, character from Final Fantasy Mystic Quest
- Spencer family (General Hospital), on General Hospital
- Spencer, on Hallo Spencer
- Spencer (Pinocchio 3000), from Pinocchio 3000
- Spencer, railway engine in Thomas the Tank Engine
- Spencer Hastings, in Pretty Little Liars
- Spencer Strasmore, from Ballers
- Spencer Shay, from iCarly
- Dr. Spencer Reid on Criminal Minds
- Ozwell E. Spencer in Resident Evil game franchise
- Frank Spencer, principal character in British TV sitcom Some Mothers Do 'Ave Em
- Oliver Spencer, in American TV series The Six Million Dollar Man
- Spencer Olham, in 2001 film Impostor
- Shawn Spencer, in the American comedy series Psych
- Spencer Lionheart, in the American animated series The Lionhearts

=== Works of art ===
- Spencer (album), a 2013 album by Spencer Albee
- Spencer (film), a 2021 drama film about Princess Diana
- Spencer (TV series), a 1984–1985 American sitcom

== Businesses ==
- Spencer's (department store), a department store chain in British Columbia, Canada (1873 to 1948)
- Spencer Gifts, a retail chain in the United States and Canada

== Maritime and military ==
- Spencer repeating rifle, a U.S. Army weapon popular from the American Civil War through the Plains Indian Wars
- Spencer or trysail, a small low sail used to maintain control of a sailing vessel in very high winds
- HMS Spencer (1800), a 74-gun third-rate ship of the line of the Royal Navy
- HMS Spencer (1795), a ship that sailed with HMS Esperance

== Other uses ==
- Spencer (clothing), a type of short jacket
- Spencer Carriage House and Stable, listed on the National Register of Historic Places in Washington, D.C.
- Spencer steak, another name for rib eye steak
- Spencer's 15-Points, a series of weights to perform moving average smoothing

== See also ==
- Spenser (disambiguation)
- Spencer Township (disambiguation)
