= Spencer Township =

Spencer Township may refer to:

== Indiana ==
- Spencer Township, DeKalb County, Indiana
- Spencer Township, Harrison County, Indiana
- Spencer Township, Jennings County, Indiana

== Michigan ==
- Spencer Township, Michigan

== Minnesota ==
- Spencer Township, Aitkin County, Minnesota

== Missouri ==
- Spencer Township, Douglas County, Missouri, in Douglas County, Missouri
- Spencer Township, Pike County, Missouri
- Spencer Township, Ralls County, Missouri

== Nebraska ==
- Spencer Township, Boyd County, Nebraska

== North Dakota ==
- Spencer Township, Ward County, North Dakota, in Ward County, North Dakota

== Ohio ==
- Spencer Township, Allen County, Ohio
- Spencer Township, Guernsey County, Ohio
- Spencer Township, Hamilton County, Ohio (defunct)
- Spencer Township, Lucas County, Ohio
- Spencer Township, Medina County, Ohio

== See also ==
- Spencer (disambiguation)
