= Anne Spencer (WRNS officer) =

British WRNS officer (1938–2012)

Commandant Anne Spencer CBE
- Born: 15 December 1938; Clayton, Yorkshire, England
- Died: 15 July 2012 (aged 73) Portsmouth, Hampshire, England
- Allegiance: United Kingdom
- Branch: Women's Royal Naval Service; Royal Navy
- Rank: Commandant
- Education: Newland School for Girls; Yorkshire College of Housecraft

Commandant Anne Christine "Annie" Spencer, CBE (15 December 1938 – 15 July 2012) was the last Director of the Women's Royal Naval Service (WRNS), serving in that post from 1991 to 1993.

== Early life ==
Spencer was born in Clayton, Yorkshire on 15 December 1938. Her father was a bank manager. She was educated at Newland School for Girls in Kingston upon Hull then the Yorkshire College of Housecraft in Leeds.

Upon graduation in 1959, she was involved in the management of school dinner services in the county. She learned Italian and applied to the British Overseas Airways Corporation (BOAC) to become a stewardess. However, she did not pass the interview stage.

== Military career ==
Spencer joined the Women's Royal Naval Service (WRNS) in 1962. By 1964, she had been appointed Quarters Officer, in charge of the WRNS officers' mess at Portsmouth. In 1979, she was sent to the North Atlantic Treaty Organization (NATO) headquarters to participate in the development of an agreed dictionary of military terms.

Spencer was promoted to superintendent, which was equivalent to captain, on 1 October 1986. She served as Director of the Navy, Army and Air Force Institutes (NAAFI) from 1986 to 1989 and as the 17th Director of the WRNS from 1991 to 1993.

As Director of the WRNS, Spencer oversaw the full integration of the branch and its 4,535 serving women, including naval nurses, into the Royal Navy. This allowed women to serve on HM Ships at sea at all ranks and rates and in the Royal Marines Band.

Spencer retired from the Royal Navy on 15 December 1993, after which her post was abolished. She was succeeded by the first Chief Naval Officer for Women in the Royal Naval Service, Captain Julia Simpson. She was appointed the Welfare Governor of the King William IV Naval Foundation.

== Personal life ==
Spencer never married nor did she have any children. She died on 15 July 2012 at the Queen Alexandra Hospital, Portsmouth, Hampshire, aged 73. Her funeral was held at St Ann's Church, Her Majesty's Naval Base, Portsmouth.

== Honours and decorations ==
In the 1994 New Year Honours, Spencer was appointed Commander of the Order of the British Empire (CBE). She was appointed Aide-de-Camp to Queen Elizabeth II on 13 March 1991.
