= Roy Spencer =

Roy Spencer may refer to:

- Roy Spencer (meteorologist), American meteorologist and research scientist
- Roy Spencer (baseball) (1900–1973), American Major League Baseball catcher
- Roy Spencer (actor) (19??–c. 2026), British actor, special effects technician, and author
