= Spencer's (department store) =

Defunct department store chain in British Columbia, Canada

David Spencer Ltd.
- Trade name: Spencer's
- Company type: Department store chain
- Industry: Retail
- Founded: 1873
- Defunct: 1948
- Fate: Stores sold to Eaton's
- Headquarters: Victoria, British Columbia
- Products: (Full-Line Department Stores) Clothing, grocery, footwear, bedding, hardware, furniture, appliances, music, cosmetics, jewellery, china, imported specialties, housewares, sporting goods, stationery, toys, home textiles, restaurant.

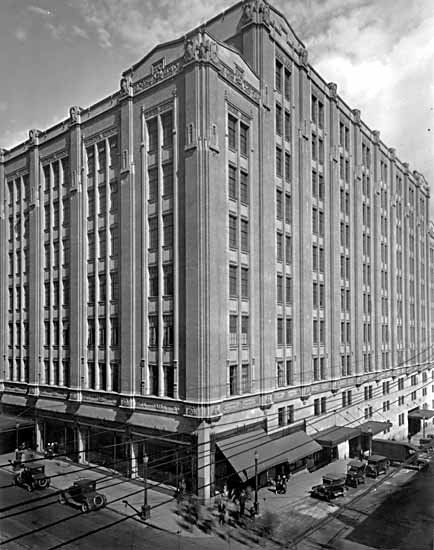
Spencer's Department Store, Vancouver

David Spencer Ltd. (commonly known as Spencer's) operated a department store chain in the province of British Columbia, Canada during the late 19th century and the first half of the 20th century.

Founded in the city of Victoria in 1873 by David W. Spencer, the first store, located on Government Street, consisted of a dry goods shop operating under the name "Spencer and Denny". The store prospered and expanded, and a second store was opened in 1890 in Nanaimo. The Vancouver store, which opened in 1907, was so successful that it soon expanded to occupy almost an entire city block. Other stores later opened in Chilliwack and New Westminster.

For a number of years, Spencer's was a rival to the Woodward's department store, another British Columbia-based chain. In 1948, however, Spencer's was acquired by the much larger Eaton's department store chain, which had stores across Canada. The nine Spencer's stores in the Lower Mainland and Vancouver Island were converted into Eaton's stores.

The second Spencer's store in downtown Victoria, at 1150 Douglas Street (which replaced the original Government Street store), operated as an Eaton's store until the late 1980s, when it was demolished to make way for the Victoria Eaton Centre shopping mall (now called the Bay Centre).

Spencer's downtown Vancouver store, on Hastings Street, operated as an Eaton's store until 1973, when Eaton's opened its new Vancouver flagship store in the newly constructed Pacific Centre shopping mall. Unlike its Victoria cousin, however, the former Spencer's store was not demolished; it was later occupied by Simpsons-Sears, and today it serves as the downtown "Harbour Centre" campus of Simon Fraser University. The building itself is currently called the Harbour Centre.

The last operating vestiges of the former Spencer's chain disappeared with the demise of the Eaton's chain in 1999.
