= Richard Spencer =

Richard Spencer may refer to:

== Politicians ==
- Richard Spencer (died 1414), MP for Salisbury, England
- Richard Spencer (Royalist) (1593–1661), English politician
- Richard Spencer (Maryland politician) (1796–1868), member of the US House of Representatives
- Richard Austin Spencer, MP for St. Helens, England
- Richard V. Spencer (born 1954), US Secretary of the Navy 2017–2019

== Other ==
- Richard B. Spencer (born 1978), American neo-Nazi and white supremacist
- Richard Spencer (Royal Navy officer) (1779–1839)
- Richard Lewis Spencer, American musician
- Richard Spencer (journalist) (born 1965), British journalist
- F. Richard Spencer (born 1951), US Roman Catholic bishop
- Richard Spencer (athlete) (born 1955), Cuban high jumper
- Richard Ball Spencer (1812–1897), British marine painter
- Rick Spencer (singer) (born 1952), American folk singer-songwriter and musical historian
- Rick Spencer (Hollyoaks), British soap opera character

== See also ==
- Richard Spencer haircut
