= David A. Spencer =

David Spencer
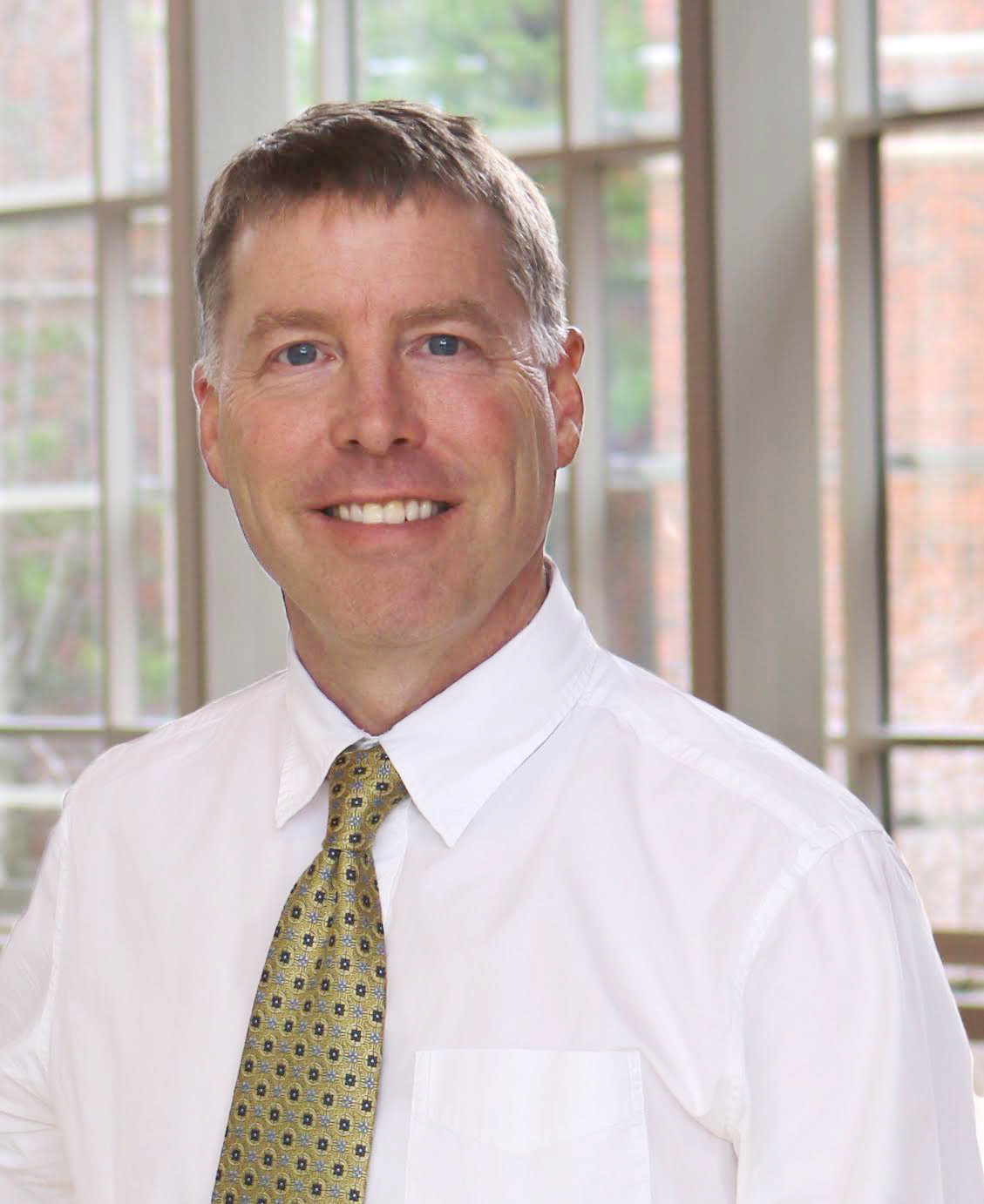
- Born: David Allen Spencer; November 21, 1965 (age 60); United States, Indiana
- Scientific career
- Fields: Aerospace engineering
- Workplaces: Applied Aerospace & Defense; Vestigo Aerospace, Inc. Jet Propulsion Laboratory; Purdue University; Georgia Institute of Technology; The Planetary Society

David A. Spencer is the Vice President of Deployable Systems for Applied Aerospace & Defense, Inc. As an aerospace engineer, Spencer has designed and operated planetary space science missions, developed space technology, and served as an engineering professor.

== Education ==
Spencer received B.S. and M.S. degrees in aeronautics and astronautics from Purdue University in W. Lafayette, Indiana. He earned his Ph.D. from the Guggenheim School of Aerospace Engineering at the Georgia Institute of Technology, completing a dissertation on automated proximity operations using relative orbital elements.

== Career ==
Spencer worked at NASA's Jet Propulsion Laboratory from 1991 through 2008. He served on the mission design and navigation team for the TOPEX/Poseidon mission, and he was the lead mission designer for Mars Pathfinder, responsible for the design of the interplanetary transfer and the entry, descent and landing (EDL) trajectory. Spencer served as the mission manager for NASA's Mars Odyssey from 1997-2002, and Deep Impact from 2004-2005, leading the mission design and operations for the projects. He was the deputy project manager for the Phoenix Mars Lander, with a focus on EDL and surface operations. Spencer left JPL in 2008 to join the Aerospace Engineering faculty at Georgia Tech.

At Georgia Tech, Spencer founded the Center for Space Systems, and was the Co-Director of the Space Systems Design Laboratory, a multi-disciplinary research and educational organization dedicated to the design, development and operations of advanced space systems and technologies. He initiated a small satellite program at Georgia Tech, establishing facilities for satellite fabrication, testing, tracking and operations. Spencer transitioned from Georgia Tech in 2016 to join the faculty of the School of Aeronautics and Astronautics at Purdue University, where he conducted research on small satellite applications, proximity operations, and aeroassist technologies. He led the Purdue Engineering Initiative on cislunar space, with the goal of expanding the orbital economy to encompass the cislunar environment.

Spencer served as mission manager for The Planetary Society's LightSail 1 spacecraft, leading the mission design and system engineering of the solar sail demonstration project. LightSail 1 was launched on May 20, 2015. Spencer led the team through a successful solar sail deployment almost a month later, before LightSail 1 reentered Earth's atmosphere. Spencer was the project manager for a second LightSail spacecraft, LightSail 2, launched in 2019. LightSail 2 was deployed into orbit by the Prox-1 spacecraft developed by Spencer and students at Georgia Tech. LightSail 2 successfully demonstrated controlled solar sailing in Earth orbit.

Spencer returned to JPL from 2020 - 2024 to serve as the Mission System Manager for the Mars Sample Return Campaign, with the objective to return a geologically diverse set of Mars samples for Earth-based laboratory analysis. The Mars Sample Return Campaign is a joint effort between the National Aeronautics and Space Administration (NASA) and the European Space Agency (ESA).

Spencer was the Founder and CEO of the 2019 startup Vestigo Aerospace, a space technology company that markets the Spinnaker product line of dragsails for the deorbit of space vehicles. Vestigo Aerospace incorporated in 2022 and received NASA Small Business Innovative Research (SBIR) funding to advance the technology. Vestigo was acquired by Applied Aerospace & Defense in January 2026, and Spencer joined Applied as VP of Deployable Systems.

== Honors and distinctions ==
- JPL Award for Excellence, Mars Pathfinder Entry, Descent and Landing design, 1998.
- NASA Exceptional Achievement Medal, Mars Pathfinder mission design, 1998.
- JPL Award for Excellence, Mars Surveyor 2001 trajectory design, 1999.
- NASA Exceptional Service Medal, Mars Odyssey mission system leadership, 2003.
- Outstanding Aerospace Engineer Award, Purdue University, 2004.
- NASA Exceptional Achievement Medal, Deep Impact mission management, 2006.
- NASA Space Act Award, Entry, Descent and Landing Monte Carlo Simulation, 2007.
- NASA Exceptional Achievement Medal, Phoenix project management, 2009.
- NASA Group Achievement Award (7 times)
- Associate Fellow, American Institute of Aeronautics and Astronautics, 2010.
- Outstanding Aerospace Teachers, College of Engineering, Purdue University, 2019.
- Most Impactful Faculty Inventors, Purdue College of Engineering, 2019.

== Selected publications ==
- Spencer, D.; Braun, R. (1997). "Mars Pathfinder Atmospheric Entry: Trajectory Design and Dispersion Analysis". Journal of Spacecraft and Rockets. 34 (2).
- Spencer, D.; Blanchard, R.; Braun, R.; Kallemeyn, P.; Peng, C-Y.; Thurman, S. (1999). "Mars Pathfinder Entry, Descent and Landing Reconstruction". Journal of Spacecraft and Rockets. 36 (3): 357–366. Bibcode:1999JSpRo..36..357S. doi:10.2514/2.3478.
- Spencer, D.; Tolson, R. (2007). "Aerobraking Cost and Risk Decisions". Journal of Spacecraft and Rockets. 44 (6): 1285–1293. Bibcode:2007JSpRo..44.1285S. doi:10.2514/1.24303.
- Arvidson, R.; Adams, D. Bonfiglio; Christensen, P.; Cull, S.; Golombek, M.; Guinn, J.; Guinness, E.; Heet, T.; Kirk, R.; Knudson, A.; Malin, M.; Mellon, M.; McEwen, A.; Mushkin, A.; Parker, T.; Seelos, F.; Seelos, K.; Smith, P.; Spencer, D.; Stein, T.; Tamppari, L (2008). "Mars Exploration Program 2007 Phoenix landing site selection and characteristics". Journal of Geophysical Research. 113 (E6): E00A03. Bibcode:2008JGRE..113.0A03A. doi:10.1029/2007JE003021.
- Spencer, D.; Adams, D.; Arvidson, R.; Bonfiglio, E.; Golombek, M.; Seelos, K. (2009). "Phoenix Landing Site Hazard Assessment and Selection". Journal of Spacecraft and Rockets. 46 (6): 1196–1201. Bibcode:2009JSpRo..46.1196S. doi:10.2514/1.43932.
- Lovell, T.A.; Spencer, D.A. (2014). "Relative Orbital Elements Formulation Based Upon the Clohessy-Wiltshire Equations". Journal of Astronautical Sciences. 61 (4): 341–366. doi:10.1007/s40295-014-0029-6. S2CID 119409007.
- Spencer, D.A. (2016). "Automated Trajectory Control Using Artificial Potential Functions to Target Relative Orbits". Journal of Guidance, Control, and Dynamics. 39 (9): 2142–2148. Bibcode:2016JGCD...39.2142S. doi:10.2514/1.G001487.
- Long, A.C.; Spencer, D.A. (2018). "A Scalable Drag Sail for the Deorbit of Small Satellites". Journal of Small Satellites. 7 (3): 773. Bibcode:2018JSSat...7..773L.
- Renevey, S.; Spencer, D.A. (2019). "Establishment and Control of Spacecraft Formations Using Artificial Potential Functions". Acta Astronautica. 162: 314–326. Bibcode:2019AcAau.162..314R. doi:10.1016/j.actaastro.2019.06.024. S2CID 197433825.
- Spencer, D.A.; Johnson, L.; Long, A.C. (2019). "Solar Sailing Technology Challenges". Journal of Aerospace Science and Technology. 93: 105276. doi:10.1016/j.ast.2019.07.009. S2CID 199087693.
- Black, A.; Spencer, D.A (2020). "DragSail Systems for Satellite Deorbit and Targeted Reentry". Journal of Space Safety Engineering. 7 (3): 397–403. Bibcode:2020JSSE....7..397B. doi:10.1016/j.jsse.2020.07.030.
- Spencer, D.A.; Betts, B.; Bellardo, J.M.; Diaz, A.; Plante, B.; Mansell, J.M. (2021). "The LightSail 2 Solar Sailing Technology Demonstration". Advances in Space Research. 67 (9): 2878–2889. doi:10.1016/j.asr.2020.06.029.
