= Spens =

Spens or SPENS may refer to:

== People ==
- Clan Spens, a kindred from the Scottish Lowlands
- Baron Spens, a title in the Peerage of the United Kingdom
- Spens (musician), Bulgarian hip-hop artist
- Janet Spens, Scottish academic
- Sir Patrick Spens, an early Scottish Ballad
- Patrick Spens, 1st Baron Spens, British lawyer, judge and Conservative politician
- Will Spens, Cambridge academic and educationist
- Sir James Spens / friherre Jacob Spens; Scottish adventurer, soldier and diplomat, and the first Swedish Baron Spens

== Other ==
- Spens clause, a mechanism for adjusting the redemption price of a bond on early repayment
- SPC Vojvodina, commonly known as SPENS, a multi-purpose venue in Novi Sad, Serbia

== See also ==
- Spence (disambiguation)
