= Tom Spencer (Florida politician) =

American politician

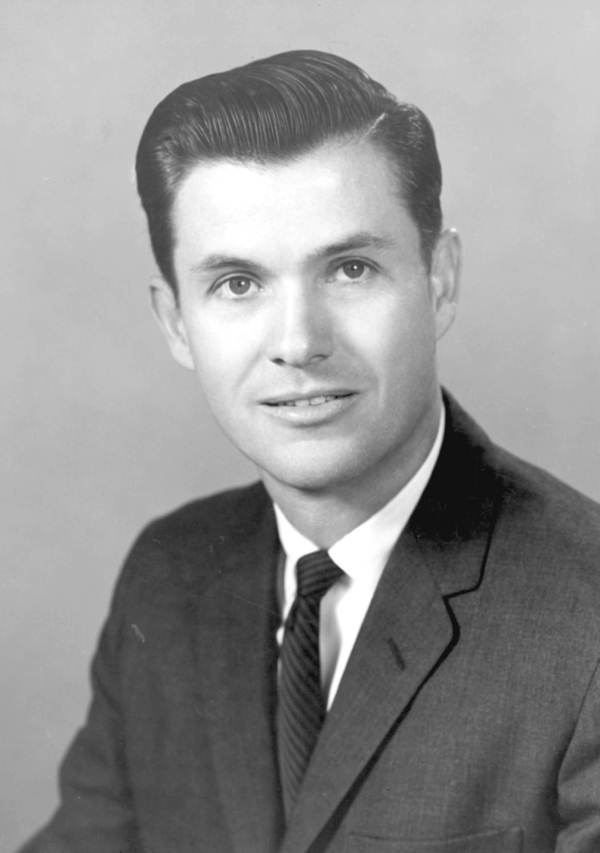

Member of the Florida Senate from the 45th district
- In office 1966 - 1968
- Preceded by: (district created)
- Succeeded by: Ken Myers

Member of the Florida House of Representatives from the Miami-Dade district
- In office 1963 – 1966

Personal details
- Born: August 6, 1928 Crawfordsville, Indiana, U.S.
- Died: September 30, 2018 (aged 90)
- Party: Democratic
- Occupation: lawyer

W. Thomas Spencer (August 6, 1928 – September 30, 2018) was an American politician in the state of Florida.

He served in the Florida State Senate from 1966 to 1968 as a Democratic member for the 45th district. He also in the Florida House of Representatives, from 1966 to 1968.
