= David W. Spencer =

- Born: August 9, 1837; St Athan, Wales
- Died: March 2, 1920; Victoria, British Columbia, Canada
- Known for: Spencer's (department store)
- Spouse: Emma Lazenby (m. 1867)

David W. Spencer (1837–1920) founded the Spencer's department store chain in Victoria, British Columbia, Canada in 1873.

After attending grammar school, Spencer completed a five-year apprenticeship at a dry goods company in Cowbridge, Wales.

Spencer died on March 2, 1920, in Victoria, British Columbia after having suffered from illness for several years.
