= Jane Spencer (journalist) =

American journalist

Jane Spencer is an American journalist, and deputy editor of Guardian US, where she oversees editorial strategy and newsroom innovation. Previously, she was editor-in-chief of Fusion Media Group, a millennial-focused cable and digital network owned by Univision. She was one of the founding editors of The Daily Beast, where she worked as Executive Editor until 2012.

Before launching The Daily Beast in 2008, Spencer was a foreign correspondent for The Wall Street Journal based in Hong Kong, where she reported on environmental issues and technology. She was part of a team of seven WSJ reporters that won the 2007 Pulitzer Prize for International Reporting, for a series of stories on China's "Naked Capitalism", which explored the health and environmental consequences of the nation's economic boom.

Spencer was the founding writer of The Wall Street Journal "Weekend Adviser" column in 2004. She covered the September 11 attacks for Newsweek in 2001.

She was awarded a 2013 Nieman Fellowship at Harvard University, where she focused on innovation in digital storytelling and new media business models. She has taught multimedia storytelling at the University of California, Berkeley Knight Digital Media Center. Spencer graduated from Brown University, and is a native of Portland, Maine.

== Awards ==
- 2007 Pulitzer Prize For International Reporting, shared with team of seven.
- 2007 Society of Publishers in Asia Excellence in Feature Writing
- 2007 Society of Publishers in Asia, Honorable Mention, Environmental Reporting
- 2008 Global Health Council Excellence in Media Award
- 2011 Front Page Award for Multimedia, The Newswoman’s Club of New York
- 2012 Webby Award for Best News Site, The Daily Beast
- 2012 National Magazine Award for Digital Media, Best Site Section (The Daily Beast, Book Beast
- 2013 Nieman Fellowship, Harvard University
