= Kenneth Abendana Spencer =

Kenneth Abendana Spencer (born Kenneth Abandamo; 13 April 1929 – 28 December 2005) was a Jamaican artist.

== Biography ==
Spencer had talent as a painter of scenes of Jamaican life which, as a boy, he would sell for pocket-money in the capital of Kingston. In the 1950s he travelled to the UK and he continued to sell his works, eventually buying a car, which became both his gallery and means of transport. He became an habitué and favourite of the basement clubs and jazz bars of Soho. His artistic education, such as it was, consisted of frequent visits to museums and art galleries where he picked up his technique. On returning to Jamaica in the 1970s, he started building a large house in Fisherman's Park, Long Bay, Portland. Six stories high with circular staircases and a vast studio, it was half castle and half temple, surrounded by a high wall. Here he settled with his common-law wife and two sons. It remains a tourist attraction. From there he continued to paint figurative canvasses—seascapes, landscapes, vignettes of Jamaican life and, from the 1970s, individual character sketches. He died on 28 December 2005, aged 76.
