= Kevin Spencer (American football) =

American football coach (born 1953)

Personal information
- Born: November 2, 1953 (age 73)

Career history
- Detroit Country Day School (1976–1979) Assistant; Cornell (1980–1981) Graduate assistant; Gilman School (1982) Assistant; Ithaca (1982–1987) Assistant; Wesleyan (1987–1991) Head coach; Cleveland Browns (1991–1995) Coaching assistant; Oakland Raiders (1995) Special teams coach; Oakland Raiders (1996) Defensive assistant coach / Special teams coach; Oakland Raiders (1997) Linebackers coach; Indianapolis Colts (1998–2001) Special teams coach; Pittsburgh Steelers (2002–2006) Special teams coach; Arizona Cardinals (2007–2011) Special teams coach; San Diego Chargers (2012–2015) Special teams coach; St. Augustine High School San Diego, CA (2016) Special teams coach; Iowa (2017–2018) Special teams consultant; New England Patriots (2019) Special teams assistant coach; Iowa (2021–2022) Special teams consultant

Kevin Spencer (born November 2, 1953) is an American football coach.

== Coaching career ==
=== Early years ===
In 1975, Spencer coached wrestling and lacrosse at the State University of New York as a graduate assistant. From 1976 to 1979 he coached at Detroit County Day High School in Birmingham, Michigan. Spencer spent the next two years as a graduate assistant at Cornell University. After coaching for one season at Gilman School in Baltimore, Maryland, Spencer received a job coaching at Ithaca College. From 1981 to 1985, he was the head freshman coach and in 1986 he served as the offensive coordinator.

=== Wesleyan University ===
Bill Belichick and Kevin Spencer competed against each other in college lacrosse and developed a friendship. When Wesleyan University was searching for a new head coach in 1987, Belichick recommended Spencer for the job. Kevin Spencer took the head coaching position at Wesleyan University where he was the head coach for five years (1987–1991). With a 6–2 record in 1990, he finished with an overall record of 14–26.

=== Cleveland Browns ===
Spencer began his NFL career with the Cleveland Browns as a coaching assistant under Bill Belichick in 1991. His final season with the team was in 1995.

=== Oakland Raiders ===
Spencer moved to the Oakland Raiders in 1995. Under Mike White, he served as special teams coach for the 1995 season. In 1996, he was named defensive assistant / special teams coach. In 1997, new head coach Joe Bugel named him linebackers coach.

=== Indianapolis Colts ===
In 1998, Spencer was hired by the Indianapolis Colts as special teams coach Jim E. Mora. He held this position until the 2001 season, the same year Mora left the team.

=== Pittsburgh Steelers ===
Signing with the Pittsburgh Steelers in 2002, Spencer was a member of the staff when the Steelers won Super Bowl XL. In 2003, Spencer was named Special Teams Coach of The Year.

=== Arizona Cardinals ===
Following the 2006 season, former Steelers offensive coordinator Ken Whisenhunt was named head coach of the Arizona Cardinals. Spencer was allowed out of the final year of his contract with the Steelers to coach for the Cardinals. Spencer made his second Super Bowl appearance in 2009 with the Cardinals.

=== San Diego Chargers ===
On January 22, 2013, Spencer was named the special teams coach of the San Diego Chargers, reuniting him with Whisenhunt.

On December 2, 2015, Spencer was fired as the Chargers special teams coach.

== Personal life ==
Spencer and his wife, Rosemarie, have two sons, Timothy and Jack. He has two children, Lindsey and Zachery, from a previous marriage.
