= Peter Spencer (farmer) =

Australian farmer (born 1948)

Peter Spencer (born 1948 or 1949) is an Australian farmer who came to national prominence after going on hunger strike in November 2009. He had been prevented from clearing "native vegetation" from his sheep farm in New South Wales and he said that this had caused severe financial difficulty.

Spencer's use of his land was restricted due to Australia's commitments to the Kyoto Protocol. He was refused compensation for his land being declared a carbon sink as it was the New South Wales government, and not the federal government in Canberra, which had enacted the laws in question, which were intended to combat global warming.

However, Spencer's family later stated:

"Native vegetation laws enacted over 10 years ago by State Governments (and certainly not the ETS proposals and "Carbon Sinks" which are a far more recent development) are not the sole reason for the collapse of Peter's farm, and really have had a very small part to play. For MANY reasons the farm has not been profitable for a long time. Peter spent several years in Papua New Guinea on various business ventures, including an advisory role to the PNG government of the time. During this time he was unable to look after the farm adequately, an issue that was clearly a product of his then circumstance."

Spencer spent 52 days suspended on a platform 15 meters above ground level. Spencer ignored a letter sent on behalf of the Prime Minister Kevin Rudd saying he did not believe it was from him. However, he reportedly invited Bob Brown, leader of the Australian Greens, to debate human rights with him.

The 61-year-old ended the strike after supporters worried for his health asked him to stop. In a statement he said, "As much as the nation is concerned about me, my concerns are directed at the families of the hundreds of farmers who have suicided and the politicians who have failed to show any concern, compassion or morality for what the government has done to these families and the nation's Constitution. My committed stance on the tower was to press the point."

Spencer was evicted from his property for failing to meet payments on loans from family members. However, he was granted the right to appeal to the High Court to decide if he should be compensated by the Commonwealth for the property having been declared a carbon sink. The High Court declared that the Federal Court was wrong to have thrown out Mr Spencer's case for compensation on the basis he had "no reasonable prospect" of success.

Despite claims of being a Christian man, Peter has been shown to have a lack of filter when it comes to commenting on political, personal and other points of interest. While there seems to be an understandable lack of coverage from the media; in home life it is prevalent. Commenting on the maturity and body features (particularly legs and thighs) of friends daughters. The lack of regard for this has been reported as troubling and worrisome.
