= Peter Spencer (journalist) =

Peter Spencer was a Sky News political correspondent from 1991 to 2013. He now works as a strictly dispassionate political commentator on GB News. He also writes a weekly column for the online Malestrom magazine, and is the author of several novels.

Before taking on his Sky role, Spencer worked as a newspaper journalist and for British Satellite Broadcasting.

== Journalism career ==
Spencer's career began as a reporter on his local newspaper in Essex and later for a Fleet Street news agency. He has also worked as a reporter and a sub-editor for three national titles and a London evening paper.

During the 1970s and 1980's he was a Westminster based political correspondent for IRN and LBC.

In 1990 he joined BSB as producer of the satirical programme Left, Right, and Centre. Upon the merger of Sky and BSB, he became a political correspondent with Sky News. He held this position until 2013, often appearing at weekends.

Spencer left Sky News in 2013. He now writes a weekly political column in the online men's lifestyle magazine Malestrom. In addition he is a regular political commentator on GB News.

His first novel, Pitfalls of Power, was published in October 2020. His second novel, Trudi's Tricks, was published in November 2022. In June 2014 he had a collection of short stories published: The X Tractor: Cornwall's Culling Plan.

== Personal life ==
Spencer is a grandfather and has been married more than once. His mother is half French and his father half Irish.
