= Spenser =

Spenser is an alternative spelling of the British surname Spencer. It may refer to:

Geographical places with the name Spenser:

- Spenser Mountains, a range in the northern part of South Island, New Zealand

People with the surname Spenser:

- David Spenser (1934–2013), British actor
- Edmund Spenser (c. 1552–1599), English poet
- John Spenser (1559–1614), president of Corpus Christi College, Oxford

People with the given name Spenser:

- Spenser St. John (19th century), British diplomat
- Spenser Wilkinson (1853–1937), British military writer
- Spenser Cohen, American screenwriter

In popular culture:

- Spenser (character), a fictional private investigator
  - Spenser: For Hire, a mystery television series about this character
  - Spenser: Small Vices, a television film about this character
  - Spenser Confidential, a television film from 2020

== See also ==
- Spencer (disambiguation)
- Spencer (surname)
