= Kevin Spencer (cyclist) =

Australian racing cyclist

Personal information
- Full name: Kevin Spencer

Cycling career
- Sport: Cycling
- Role: Rider

Kevin Spencer is a former Australian racing cyclist. He won the Australian national road race title in 1972.
