= Spencer (surname) =

Family name

- Pronunciation: spènser, /ˈspɛnsər/ spEnser

Origin
- Origin: Medieval Latin: "dispensa" and "dispensator"; Old French: "despensier"; Anglo-French: "espenser"; Middle English: "spens", "Spenser"
- Meaning: derived from the Old French "despensier", a steward
- Region of origin: England

Other names
- Variant forms: Spenser, Spender, Espencer, Spence, Spens
- Related names: Speiser (German), Economos (Greek)

Spencer (also Spenser) is an English surname, originating from the Old French word despensier, meaning dispenser or steward. In medieval England, it was a title/status surname, representing the court title dispenser or steward. An early example is Robert d'Abbetot, who is listed as Robert le Dispenser ('the steward'), a tenant-in-chief of several counties, in the Domesday Book of 1086.

Despenser/Spencer families would have originated in a range of different jurisdictions, and the possession of the shared surname is not an indication of genealogical relationship.

In early times, the surname was usually written as le Despenser, Dispenser or Despencer—notably in works such as the Domesday Book and the Scottish Ragman Rolls of 1291 and 1296, but gradually lost both the "le" article and the unstressed first syllable of the longer surname to become Spencer.

The origin and meaning of the Gaelic surname Mac Spealáin, meaning 'son of Spealáin' comes from Ireland. Spealáin comes from the word speal, which means 'scythe.' The Gaelic surname Mac Spealáin was anglicized and has many variations, including, Spenser, Spellane, Spollen, Spelman and Spellman.

The surname Spencer has gained in frequency over time. In the 19th century it also become popular as a given name—especially in the more anglicised areas of the United States.

== Variations ==
=== English ===
In its transition from the French dispencier to its current form, the name Spencer has been presented and spelled in many ways—especially through the period of its early evolution in the medieval period from c. 1100 to 1350 CE. The following (in alphabetical order) is a selection of the many orthographic variants:

Despencer, de Expansa (derived from expence), De Spencer, de Spendure, de Spens, de la Despense, De la Spence, de la Spense, del Spens, Despenser, DeSpenser, Dispencer, Dispenser, Despensator, Dispensator, la Spens, le Despencer, le Despendur, le Despencer, le Despenser, le dispencer, le Espencer, le Espenser, le Spencer, le Spendur, Spendure, le Spenser, le Spensier, Spence, Spences, Spen, Spens, Spensar, Spense, Spenser, Spensers, Spensor, Spincer, also the rare patronymic Spencers, and the aphetic (derived) Spender.

The surnames Stewart and Stuart denote essentially the same occupation but have a completely different word derivation. They originate from the pre-7th-century English words stigweard – a compound of stig meaning 'household', and weard, meaning 'guardian'.

=== Other countries and cultures ===
Foreign equivalents:

Ireland: Spencer is an anglicized version of the Gaelic surname Mac Spealáin, meaning 'son of Spealáin.' Spealáin comes from the word speal, which means 'scythe.' It has many variations, including, Spenser, Spellane, Spillane, Spollin, Spelman and Spellman.

German and Yiddish: Speiser – a steward. This is a derivative of the Middle High German spise, meaning food or supplies via the Old High German—in turn derived from Late Latin expe(n)sa (pecunia), or "(money) expended".

Greek: Economos – the anglicised surname derived from the Greek oikonomos ("oi" in Greek pronounced as a long E.) Oiko- (English = ēco-) is a root meaning "house" in classical Greek. This surname has the same occupational derivation as Spencer but, like the surnames Stewart and Stuart, has a different etymology. The original meaning of oikonomos was a home owner but it evolved to mean estate manager, somebody who was responsible for all resources on the estate, a steward. Oikonomos was a medieval Eastern Roman title for somebody who was in charge of a project or institution; it is still used by the Greek Orthodox church. Over time the meaning of Oikonomos has evolved from "manager of resources" to "manager of money, a treasurer".

== Etymology ==
The name Spencer can be traced through its Latin and French roots to its Middle English and modern form.

Medieval Latin – dispensa, dispensator and dispensarius – 'steward'.
Old French –

a. despense – 'larder'
b. espenser, espensier – dispenser of money, provisions etc.; someone working at, or in charge of, the buttery; a household steward
c. despendour – 'steward'.

Anglo-French – despenser, -ier.
Middle English – dispensour – 'steward'.

== Noteworthy Despenser and Spencer families ==
=== Robert Despenser ===
Robert d'Abbetot (Note: Robert's toponymic, d'Abbetot, indicates his place of origin, the present-day Normandy village of St-Jean-d'Abbetot. In the historical literature his name, and that of the village, are spelled and presented in many ways including d'Abitot, d'Abetot, Dabitote, d'Abbetot, d'Arbitot and d'Albeto: the "d" is sometimes capitalised or anglicised to "of".) was granted titles, lands and a high position in William's court. In addition to his position as steward, he also was given land grants in county Bedford. He held his office for the period c.1088–1098.

In England, Robert was best known by his occupation, and hence became known as Robert le Despenser (many spelling variants of this name exist including Robert the Dispensor, Robert Despensator, Robert Dispenser), which reflected his new official position, of using a patronymic, as Robert fitzThurstin. He seems to have maintained his favor with William because in the Domesday Book of 1086, Robert Despenser was listed as a land tenant-in-chief in Gloucestershire, Leicestershire, Lincolnshire, Oxfordshire, and Warwickshire, as well as holding lands in Worcestershire obtained from the Bishop of Worcester.

Robert is assumed to have died shortly after restoring some estates to Westminster Abbey but he appears to have had no legitimate male children, as his heir was his brother Urse d'Abetot. He may have had a daughter, as some of his lands were inherited by the Marmion family, but it is also possible that a daughter of Urse married into the Marmion family. Robert's office as the king's steward may also have gone to Urse, as it was later held by Urse's heirs. Subsequent bearers of the Despenser or Spencer surname would not descend from Robert.

=== King's Dispensers ===
The steward of William II of England was Thurstan, Dispensator Regis (royal steward). His son Hugh was Dispensator Regis in 1105 under Henry I, and was followed by his son or brother, Simon, Dispensator Regis for Henry and Stephen. Simon was father of a second Thurstan, who was active in the 1250s under Henry II, to be followed by his son Walter as Dispensator Regis. Walter was succeeded by his brother Aymer, Dispensator Regis under king John, and Aymer's son Thurstan le Despenser, who served under Henry III, dying in 1249. He was followed by a son, Adam le Despenser, who was summoned by Edward I of England to perform military service and in 1283 to attend on the king in what was a precursor to the first royally-convened Parliament. His heir was a son, Aymer le Despenser, but he alienated his lands and titles during the reign of Edward II.

=== Lords Despencer ===
Arms of the Lords Despencer

In the early 13th century, a family that had been stewards to the Earls of Chester rose to prominence. Hugh le Despenser (died 1238) became High Sheriff of Berkshire, and his son, Hugh became Justiciar of England and was summoned in 1264 to the Parliament of Simon de Montfort as Lord Despencer. His son also named Hugh was created Earl of Winchester, while a descendant was made Earl of Gloucester. The family experienced a number of attainders, restorations, and creations of new lordships over the 13th and 14th centuries, with a claim to the last creation passing by marriage to the Wentworth family in the 15th century. The initial establishment was brought out of abeyance in favour of a female-line descendant in 1604, from which time the title of Baron le Despencer has descended to the current Viscount Falmouth.

=== Spencer aristocracy ===
Arms of Sir John Spencer of Wormleighton and Althorp, adopted c. 1595

The English aristocratic Spencer family has resided at their ancestral home at Althorp, Northamptonshire, since the early 16th century. The Estate now covers 14,000 acres (57 km^{2}) in Northamptonshire, Warwickshire and Norfolk. From pre-Tudor times the Spencers had been farmers, coming to prominence in Warwickshire in the 15th century when John Spencer became feoffee of Wormleighton in 1469, and a tenant at Althorp in 1486. His nephew, another John, used the gains from trade in livestock and commodities to buy both properties. He was knighted in 1504 and died in 1522. John's descendants expanded the family holdings through business dealings and marriage into the peerage. The family is related through marriage to the Churchills of Blenheim Palace, a line that included the Dukes of Marlborough and Winston Churchill. From the Althorp line came the Earls of Sunderland, the later Dukes of Marlborough, and the Earls Spencer. The family captured international attention when Lady Diana Frances Spencer married Prince Charles on 29 July 1981, until her death in a car crash in Paris on 31 August 1997.

=== Heraldry ===
The varied origins of people with the Spencer and Despenser surnames means that they are not all members of the same family, and each individual family would have distinct coats of arms, while most Spencers are not entitled to bear any arms. The family of the King's Dispensers bore an ermine shield with chief of unknown tincture. The Lords Despencer bore arms from the early days of heraldry, which are one of a family of quarterly arms seen among the vassals of the Earls of Chester. Scholars have suggested a possible derivation from those of the Dutton family, or from the family of their one-time feudal overlords, Beauchamp of Bedford, whose own arms belonged to a shared group of similar bearings among Mandeville and Vere family vassals and descendants. They are described in the language of heraldry as quarterly: 1st & 4th, Argent; 2nd & 3rd, Gules a fret or, over all a bend sable. In 1504, John Spencer of Althorp was granted for himself and his brother the arms: azure, a fess ermine between six sea-mews' heads erased argent, and in 1564 a descendant of his uncle was granted: sable, on a fess or, between 3 bezants, as many lions heads of the first. As the end of the century approached, however, the family's growing social status would lead them to adopt a forged pedigree that gave them an ancient derivation, and they began using new arms that represented a claimed kinship with the (actually entirely unrelated) Lords Despencer, modifying the earlier family's quarterly arms by the addition of three escallops (scallop shells). Numerous variations of this differenced coat, along with various Spencer arms bearing no resemblance to those of the Lords le Despenser, have been catalogued.

== Distribution and spread ==
The greatest density of Spencers in present-day England is in Nottinghamshire, followed by Derbyshire. Derby and Notts were closely connected at the time of Domesday, and up until the time of Elizabeth I had the same Sheriff.

In North America early settlement of Spencers date to Thomas Spencer in Virginia in 1623; William Spencer, Cambridge, Massachusetts in 1630; Thomas Spencer, Maine 1630. Col. Nicholas Spencer arrived in Virginia in the 1650s and subsequently served as Acting Governor.

Spencers arriving in Australia with the convicts of the First Fleet in 1788 were Daniel Spencer from Dorchester, John Spencer, and Mary Spence from Wigan. With the Third Fleet in 1791 came John Spencer from Lancaster and Thomas Spencer from London.

== See also ==
- Spencer's (disambiguation)
- Spence (surname)
- Spens (disambiguation)
