= Spencer (given name) =

- Pronunciation: /ˈspɛnsər/
- Gender: Unisex
- Language: English

Origin
- Languages: 1. Latin; 2. Old French; 3. Anglo-French; 4. English
- Origin: From the surname
- Derivation: From the English word "dispenser", from Anglo-French "dispensour", from Old French "dispenseor", from Latin "dispensatorem"
- Meaning: "dispenser of provisions"
- Region of origin: England

Other names
- Variant form: Spenser
- Short form: Spen
- Nickname: Spence

Spencer is a given name of British origin that means "steward" or "administrator". It is a shortened form of the English word dispenser, which derives from Anglo-French dispensour, from Old French dispenseor, from Latin dispensatorem, the agent noun of dispensare, meaning "to disperse, administer, and distribute (by weight)". The name originated as the surname Spencer, but later gradually came to be used as a given name as well.

From its origin as a surname, it has been given to both males and females, but it has historically been more common as a name for males. According to the Social Security Administration of the United States, its popularity as a male given name began increasing steadily in the early twentieth century and spiked dramatically in the 1980s, 1990s, and early 2000s. Its usage peaked in 1998 with 4,619 baby boys named Spencer in that year. In the late 2000s, the name's popularity for male infants declined and plateaued between roughly 1,400 – 1,500 boys named Spencer each year.

Its usage as a female given name began to gradually increase in the late 1970s before suddenly taking off in the mid-1980s. Female usage of the name declined in the late 2000s, but has been rising rapidly since 2009. 244 baby girls were named Spencer in 2016.

== Men ==
- Spencer Abbott (disambiguation), multiple people
- Spencer Abraham (born 1952), American politician
- Spencer Ackerman, American journalist
- Spencer Adams (1898–1970), American baseball player
- Spencer Adkins (born 1987), American football player
- Spencer Albee (born 1976), American musician
- Spencer Allen (1893–1978), English cricketer
- Spencer Anderson (born 2000), American football player
- Spencer Armstrong (born 1986), Canadian football player
- Spencer Asah (died 1954), American painter
- Spencer Austen-Leigh (1834–1913), English cricketer
- Spencer Bachus (born 1947), American politician
- Spencer Banks (born 1954), British television actor
- Spencer Batiste (born 1945), British politician
- Spencer Fullerton Baird (1823–1887), American ornithologist
- Spencer Barrett (ecologist) (born 1948), Canadian ecologist
- Spencer Bayles, British musician and former Guinness World Record holder
- Spencer Bedford (1851–1933), English-born Canadian politician
- Spencer Bell (actor) (1887–1935), American actor
- Spencer Gordon Bennet (1893–1987), American director
- Spencer John Bent (1891–1977), British army officer
- Spencer Bernard (songwriter), American musician and songwriter
- Spencer Bernard (politician) (1918–2001), American politician
- Spencer Black (born 1950), American politician
- Spencer Bloch (born 1944), American mathematician
- Spencer Bohren (1950–2019), American musician
- Spencer Boldman (born 1992), American actor
- Spencer Breslin (born 1992), American actor and musician
- Spencer Brown (disambiguation), multiple people
- Spencer Burford (born 2000), American football player
- Spencer Butterfield (born 1992), American basketball player
- Spencer Cavendish, 8th Duke of Devonshire (1833–1908), British politician
- Spencer Chamberlain (born 1983), American singer for the Christian post-hardcore band Underoath
- Spencer Chan (1892–1988), American character actor
- Spencer Charrington (1818–1904), British politician
- Spencer Charters (1875–1943), American actor
- Spencer Christian (born 1947), American television personality
- Spencer Clack (1740–1832), American politician from Tennessee
- Spencer Clark (disambiguation), multiple people
- Spencer Coggs (born 1949), American politician
- Spencer Compton (disambiguation), multiple people
- Spencer J. Condie (born 1940), American leader of The Church of Jesus Christ of Latter-day Saints
- Spencer Houghton Cone (1785–1855), American child prodigy and Baptist chaplain
- Spencer Cowper (1670–1728), British politician
- Spencer Cox (born 1975), American lawyer and politician
- Spencer Cozens (born 1965), English musician
- Spencer Crakanthorp (1885–1936), Australian chess player
- Spencer Daniels (born 1992), American actor
- Spencer Davey (born 1983), British rugby player
- Spencer Davis (1939–2020), British musician
- Spencer de Grey (born 1944), British architect
- Spencer Dickinson (politician), American politician
- Spencer Dinwiddie, American basketball player
- Spencer Dryden (1938–2005), American musician
- Spencer Eccles (born 1934), American philanthropist
- Spencer Elden (born 1991), American model and artist
- Spencer Evans (born 1973), Welsh soccer player
- Spencer Fano (born 2004), American football player
- Spencer Fearon (born 1962), British media personality
- Spencer Finch, American artist
- Spencer Fisher (born 1976), American mixed martial arts fighter
- Spencer O. Fisher (1843–1919), American politician
- Spencer Folau (born 1973), Tongan-born American football player
- Spencer Ford (born 1976), American lacrosse player
- Spencer Ford (American football), American college football coach
- Spencer Fox (born 1993), American actor
- Spencer Freedman (born 1998), American college basketball player for the Harvard Crimson and NYU Violets
- Spencer Garrett (born 1963), American actor
- Spencer Giesting (born 2001), American baseball player
- Spencer Gollan (1860–1934), New Zealand athlete
- Spencer Gore (disambiguation), multiple people
- Spencer Hall (1805–1875), British librarian
- Spencer Hastings, a character in the Freeform show Pretty Little Liars and the books they are inspired by
- Spencer Havner (born 1983), American football player
- Spencer Hawes (born 1988), American basketball player
- Spencer Hays (1936–2017), American businessman and art collector
- Spencer Haywood (born 1949), American basketball player
- Spencer Heath (1876–1963), American anarchist, engineer, attorney, inventor, manufacturer, poet, philosopher and social thinker
- Spencer Heath (baseball) (1893–1930), American baseball player
- Spencer Chandra Herbert (born 1981), Canadian politician
- Spencer Edmund Hollond (1874–1950), British World War I army officer
- Spencer Holst (1926–2001), American writer
- Spencer B. Horn (1895–1969), British soldier and World War I flying ace
- Spencer Horsey de Horsey (1790–1860), British politician
- Spencer Horwitz (born 1997), American MLB first baseman for the Toronto Blue Jays
- Spencer Howard (born 1996), American professional baseball player
- Spencer Howson (born 1972), British-born Australian radio personality
- Spencer James (born 1953), British musician
- Spencer Jarnagin (1792–1853), American politician
- Spencer Johnson (disambiguation), multiple people
- Spencer Jones (disambiguation), multiple people
- Spencer Kelly (born 1973), British television personality
- Spencer W. Kimball (1895–1985), American president of The Church of Jesus Christ of Latter-day Saints
- Spencer Matthews King (1917–1988), Puerto Rican-born American Ambassador
- Spencer Kobren, American businessman, author and radio personality
- Spencer Krug (born 1977), Canadian singer, songwriter and keyboardist
- Spencer Lanning (born 1988), American gridiron football punter
- Spencer Larsen (born 1984), American football fullback
- Spencer List (born April 6, 1998), American actor
- Spencer Lister (1876–1939), English-born South African doctor and bacteriologist
- Spencer Livermore (born 1975), English politician
- Spencer G. Lucas, American paleontologist
- Spencer Miles (born 2000), American baseball player
- Spencer G. Millard (1856–1895), American politician
- Spencer Millman, British television producer
- Spencer Le Marchant Moore (1850–1931), British botanist
- Spencer Nelson (born 1980), American Gaelic games champion
- Spencer Odom (1913–1962), pianist-arranger
- R. Spencer Oliver (born 1938), American government staffer and diplomat
- Spencer Oliver (born 1975), English former professional boxer
- Spencer Overton (born 1968), American lawyer
- Spencer J. Palmer (1927–2000), American historian and chronicler of The Church of Jesus Christ of Latter-day Saints
- Spencer Patton (born 1988), American professional baseball player
- Spencer Penrose (1865–1939), American philanthropist
- Spencer Perceval (disambiguation), multiple people
- Spencer Petras (born 1999), American football player
- Spencer Darwin Pettis (1802–1831), American politician
- Spencer Ponsonby-Fane (1824–1915), British cricketer and civil servant
- Spencer Pope (1893–1976), American football player
- Spence Powell (1903–1970), Australian politician
- Spencer Pratt (born 1983), American actor
- Spencer Prior (born 1971), English soccer player
- Spencer Pumpelly (born 1974), American race car driver
- Spencer Rattler (born 2000), American football player
- Spencer Reid (born 1981), a character in the CBS show Criminal Minds
- Spencer Rice (born 1967), Canadian writer, director, producer, and comedian
- Spencer Ross (born 1940), American sportscaster
- Spencer Sanders (born 1999), American football player
- Spencer Schnell (born 1994), American football player
- Spencer Gene Settles (born 1953), American football player
- Spencer Shrader (born 1999), American football player
- Spencer Smith (disambiguation), multiple people, including:
- Spencer Sotelo (born 1987), American singer
- Spencer Stastney (born 2000), American ice hockey player
- Spencer Stone (born 1992), American U.S. Air Force staff sergeant
- Spencer C. Tucker (born 1937), Fulbright scholar and historian
- Spencer Campbell Thomson (1842–1931), Scottish actuary and influential businessman
- Spencer Thomas (born 1951), American football player
- Spencer Tillman (born 1964), American football player
- Spencer Toone (born 1980), American football player
- Spencer Torkelson (born 1999), American baseball player
- Spencer Tracy (1900–1967), American actor
- Spencer Trask (1844–1909), American financier, philanthropist
- Spencer Trethewy (born 1971), English football manager and property developer
- Spencer Trevor (1875–1945), British actor
- Spencer Tucker (cricketer) (1865–1948), New Zealand cricketer
- Spencer C. Tucker (born 1937), American military historian
- Spencer Tunick (born 1967), American photographer
- Spencer Turnbull (born 1992), American baseball player
- Spencer Turrin (born 1991), Australian rower
- Spencer Tyler, American athlete
- Spencer Verbiest (born 1984), Belgian soccer player
- Spencer Walklate (1918–1945), Australian rugby league footballer
- Spencer Walpole (1839–1907), English historian and civil servant
- Spencer Horatio Walpole (1806–1898), British Conservative politician
- Spencer Ware (born 1991), American football player
- Spencer K. Warnick (1874–1954), American politician
- Spencer Watt (born 1988), Canadian football wide receiver
- Spencer R. Weart (born 1942), American historian
- Spencer Webb (2000–2022), American football player
- Spencer Weir-Daley (born 1985), Montserratian footballer
- Spencer Weisz (born 1995), American-Israeli basketball player
- Spencer Wells (born 1969), American author and geneticist
- Spencer West (born 1981), American motivational speaker and disability advocate
- Spencer Westmacott (1885–1960), New Zealand farmer and memoirist
- Spencer Whelan (1971–2021), English footballer
- Spencer Whipple (born 1989), American football coach
- Spencer White (born 1994), Australian rules footballer
- Spencer Wiggins (1942–2023), American singer
- Spencer Wilding (born 1972), Welsh actor
- Spencer Wilks (1891–1971), English car design engineer
- Spencer Williams (1889–1965), American musician, composer, and singer
- Spencer Williams Jr. (1893–1969), American actor and filmmaker
- Spencer Mortimer Williams (1922–2008), American judge
- Spencer Wilshire (born 1945), Welsh international lawn and indoor bowler
- Spencer Wilson (born 1988), Canadian football offensive lineman
- Spencer Wilton (born 1973), British equestrian
- Spencer Wingrave (born 1969), English racing cyclist
- Spencer Wishart (1889–1914), American racing driver
- Spencer S. Wood (1861–1940), United States Navy admiral
- Spencer X (born 1992), American beatboxer

== Women ==
- Spencer Ganus, American actress
- Spencer Grammer (born 1983), American actress
- Spencer Kayden (born 1968), American actress, comedian, and writer
- Spencer Locke (born 1991), American actress
- Spencer Moss, American actress
- Spencer Nakacwa (born 1999), Ugandan footballer
- Spencer O'Brien (born 1988), Canadian snowboarder
- Spencer Peppet, Member rock group The Ophelias (Ohio band)
- Spencer Redford (born 1983), American actress and singer
- Spencer Richmond (born 1985), daughter of Jaclyn Smith and Anthony B. Richmond
- Spencer Saxton, 1996 plane crash survivor
- Spencer Scott (born 1989), American model, pornographic actress, and Playboy Playmate
- Spencer Wetmore (born 1983), American politician

== Fictional characters ==
- Spencer Carlin, from the American teen drama TV series South of Nowhere
- Spencer Gray, from the British soap opera Hollyoaks
- Spencer Hastings, from the American teen drama Pretty Little Liars
- Spencer Reid, from the American police-procedural TV program Criminal Minds
- Spencer Shay, a character from the American teen sitcom iCarly
- Spencer Lionhearts, from the American animated series The Lionhearts

== See also ==
- Spencer (disambiguation)
- Spencer (surname)
