= List of Detroit Tigers no-hitters =

The Detroit Tigers are a Major League Baseball franchise based in Detroit, Michigan. They play in the American League Central division. Pitchers for the Tigers have thrown nine no-hitters in franchise history. A no-hitter is officially recognized by Major League Baseball only "when a pitcher (or pitchers) allows no hits during the entire course of a game, which consists of at least nine innings. In a no-hit game, a batter may reach base via a walk, an error, a hit by pitch, a passed ball or wild pitch on strike three, or catcher's interference." No-hitters of less than nine complete innings were previously recognized by the league as official; however, several rule alterations in 1991 changed the rule to its current form. A perfect game, a special subcategory of no-hitter, has yet to be thrown in Tigers history. As defined by Major League Baseball, "in a perfect game, no batter reaches any base during the course of the game." This feat came closest on June 2, 2010 when Armando Galarraga lost his perfect game bid against the Cleveland Indians with two outs in the ninth due to the incorrect call made by a first base umpire Jim Joyce. But there are two other times when the Tigers had perfect game bids lost with two outs in the ninth, one in 1932 and the other in 1983. The Tigers lead all franchises with three perfect game bids lost with two outs in the ninth.

George Mullin threw the first no-hitter in Tigers history on July 4, 1912; the most recent no-hitter was a combined effort thrown by Matt Manning, Jason Foley, and Alex Lange on July 8, 2023. All nine Tigers no-hitters were thrown by right-handers. Virgil Trucks and Verlander are the only pitchers in Tigers history to throw more than one no-hitter. Three no-hitters were thrown at home and four on the road. They threw one in April, two in May, one in June, two in July, and one in August. The longest interval between no-hitters was between the games pitched by Mullin and Trucks, encompassing 39 years, 10 months, and 11 days from July 4, 1912 till May 15, 1952. Conversely, the shortest interval between no-hitters was between the two games pitched by Trucks, encompassing merely 3 months and 10 days from May 15, 1952 till August 25, 1952. The opponents no-hit by the Tigers are St. Louis Browns (now Baltimore Orioles), Washington Senators (now Minnesota Twins), New York Yankees, Boston Red Sox, Chicago White Sox, Milwaukee Brewers, Toronto Blue Jays, and the Seattle Mariners. In none of those no-hitters did the team allow any runs. The most baserunners allowed in a no-hitter were by Trucks (his first no-hitter in 1952) and Morris (in 1984), who each allowed six. Of the seven no-hitters, two have been won by a score of 1–0 and two by the score of 4–0, more common than any other results. The largest margin of victory in a no-hitter was a 9–0 win by Verlander in 2011. The smallest margin of victory was two 1–0 wins by Trucks both in 1952.

The umpire is also an integral part of any no-hitter. The task of the umpire in a baseball game is to make any decision "which involves judgment, such as, but not limited to, whether a batted ball is fair or foul, whether a pitch is a strike or a ball, or whether a runner is safe or out… [the umpire's judgment on such matters] is final." Part of the duties of the umpire making calls at home plate includes defining the strike zone, which is defined as the "area over home plate the upper limit of which is a horizontal line at the midpoint between the top of the shoulders and the top of the uniform pants, and the lower level is a line at the hollow beneath the kneecap." These calls define every baseball game and are therefore integral to the completion of any no-hitter. A different umpire presided over each of the Tigers' eight no-hitters.

The manager is another integral part of any no-hitter. The tasks of the manager include determining the starting rotation as well as batting order and defensive lineup every game. Managers choosing the right pitcher and right defensive lineup at a right game at a right place at a right time would lead to a no-hitter. Jim Leyland and A. J. Hinch are the only Tigers managers to skipper more than one no-hitter.

== No-hitters ==
¶	Indicates a perfect game
£	Pitcher was left-handed
*	Member of the National Baseball Hall of Fame and Museum

#	Date	Pitcher	Final score	Base- runners	Opponent	Catcher	Plate umpire	Manager	Notes	Ref
1	July 4, 1912	George Mullin	7–0	2	St. Louis Browns	Oscar Stanage	Bill Dinneen	Hughie Jennings	Second game of a doubleheader	
2	May 15, 1952	Virgil Trucks (1)	1–0	6	Washington Senators	Joe Ginsberg	Jim Honochick	Red Rolfe	Smallest margin of victory in a Tigers no-hitter (tie); Most baserunners allowed in a Tigers no-hitter (tie); Longest interval between no-hitters in franchise history	
3	August 25, 1952	Virgil Trucks (2)	1–0	3	@ New York Yankees	Matt Batts	Scotty Robb	Fred Hutchinson	Smallest margin of victory in a Tigers no-hitter (tie); First Tigers no-hitter on the road; Shortest interval between no-hitters in franchise history; Latest calendar date of Tigers no-hitter; Trucks pitched two no-hitters in same season despite finishing the season 5–19 but with a 3.97 ERA	
4	July 20, 1958	Jim Bunning*	3–0	3	@ Boston Red Sox	Red Wilson	Frank Umont	Bill Norman	First game of a doubleheader	
5	April 7, 1984	Jack Morris*	4–0	6	@ Chicago White Sox	Lance Parrish	Durwood Merrill	Sparky Anderson	Most baserunners allowed in a Tigers no-hitter (tie); Earliest calendar date of Tigers no-hitter	
6	June 12, 2007	Justin Verlander (1)	4–0	4	Milwaukee Brewers	Iván Rodríguez	Ron Kulpa	Jim Leyland (1)	First no-hitter at Comerica Park	
7	May 7, 2011	Justin Verlander (2)	9–0	1	@ Toronto Blue Jays	Alex Avila	Jerry Meals	Jim Leyland (2)	Largest margin of victory in a Tigers no-hitter; Only baserunner was a one out walk in the 8th, who was erased on a double play by the next batter; Fewest baserunners allowed (1) and fewest batters faced (27) in a franchise's no-hitter	
8	May 18, 2021	Spencer Turnbull	5–0	2	@ Seattle Mariners	Eric Haase	Ángel Hernández	A. J. Hinch (1)	Fifth no-hitter managed by A. J. Hinch	
9	July 8, 2023	Matt Manning (6.2 IP); Jason Foley (1.1 IP); Alex Lange (1 IP)	2–0	4	Toronto Blue Jays	Eric Haase	Erich Bacchus	A. J. Hinch (2)	Most recent no-hitter in franchise history; First combined no-hitter in franchise history	

== See also ==
- Armando Galarraga's near-perfect game
- List of Major League Baseball no-hitters
