= Spence (given name) =

Spence is a masculine given name or nickname, often a short form of Spencer.

It may refer to:

- Spence M. Armstrong (born 1934), retired United States Air Force lieutenant general and test pilot
- Spence Broughton (c. 1746–1792), English highwayman
- Spence Caldwell (1909–1983), Canadian broadcasting pioneer
- Spence Moore II (fl. 2016–present), American actor
- Spence Powell (1903–1970), Australian politician
- Spencer Tracy (1900–1967), American actor
