= History of the Detroit Tigers =

The history of the Detroit Tigers, a professional baseball franchise based in Detroit, Michigan, dates back to 1894 when they were a member of the minor league Western League. Becoming a charter member of the American League in 1901, they are the oldest continuous one name, one city franchise in the league.

== Western League beginnings (1894–1900) ==
The franchise was founded as a member of the reorganized Western League in 1894. They originally played at Boulevard Park, sometimes called League Park. It was located on East Lafayette, then called Champlain Street, between Helen and East Grand Boulevard, near Belle Isle. In 1895, owner George Vanderbeck decided to build Bennett Park at the corner of Michigan and Trumbull Avenues, which would remain their base of operations for the next 104 seasons. The first game at The Corner was an exhibition on April 13, 1896. The team, now occasionally called the "Tigers", beat a local semi-pro team, known as the Athletics, by a score of 30–3. They played their first Western League game at Bennett Park on April 28, 1896, defeating the Columbus Senators 17–2.

At the end of the 1897 season, Rube Waddell was lent to the team to gain professional experience. After being fined, Waddell left Detroit to pitch in Canada.

When the Western League renamed itself the American League for 1900, it was still a minor league, but the next year, it broke from the National Agreement and declared itself a major league, openly competing with the National League for players and for fans in four contested cities. For a while, there were rumors of the team relocating to Pittsburgh, but the two leagues made peace in 1903 when they signed a new National Agreement.

== First Major League season (1901) ==
The Tigers were established as a charter member of the now major league American League in 1901. They played their first game as a major league team at home against the Milwaukee Brewers on April 25, 1901, with an estimated 10,000 fans at Bennett Park. After entering the ninth inning behind 13–4, the team staged a dramatic comeback to win 14–13. The team finished third in the eight-team league.

They were the first major league team to have a mascot—a red tiger on a dark background—on their ballcap. It was replaced by the letter "D" in 1903, and their iconic Olde English-style letterform appeared the following season.

== The Cobb era (1905–1926) ==
=== 1905 ===
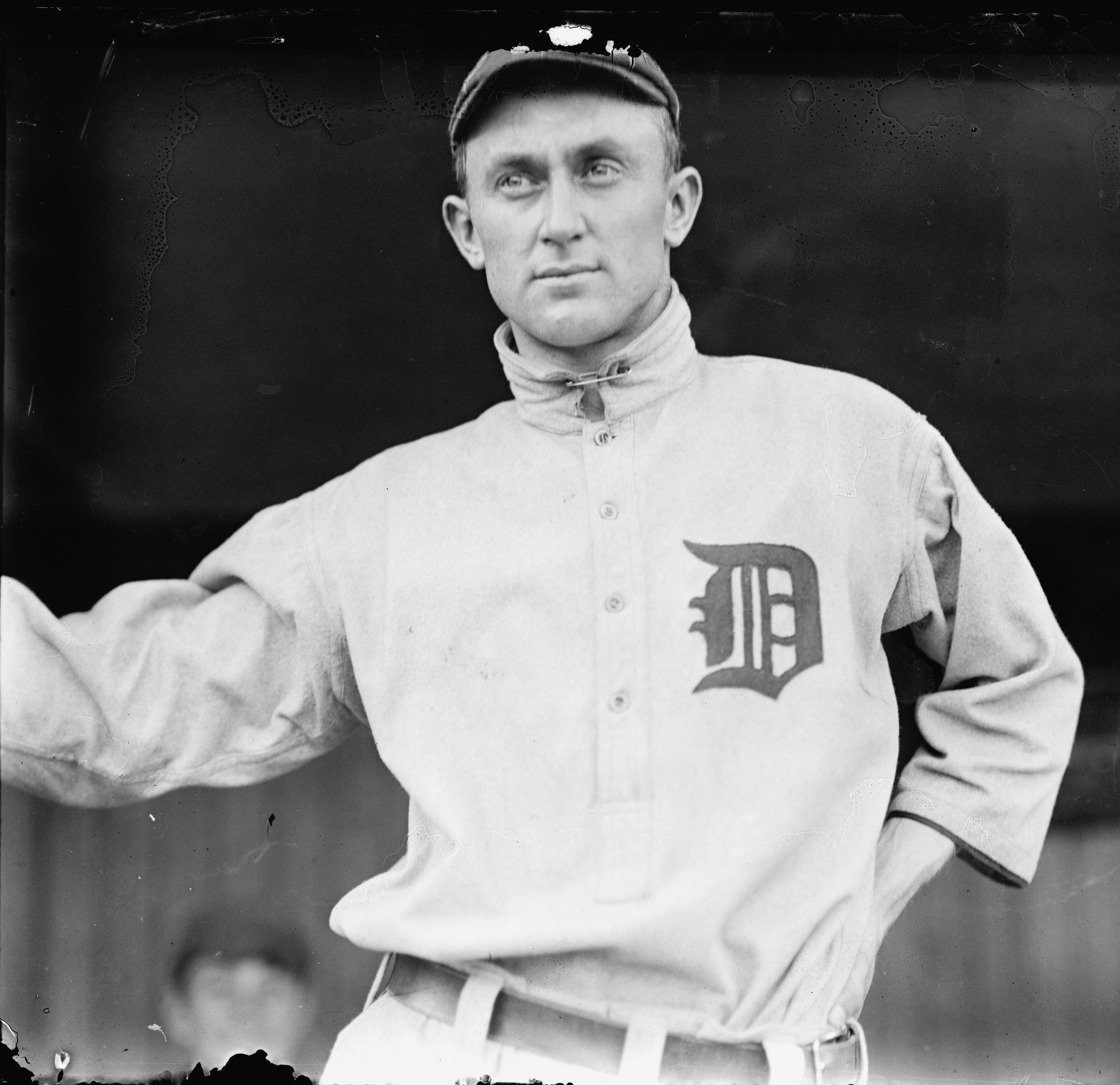
Ty Cobb in 1913

In 1905, the team acquired 18-year-old Ty Cobb, a fearless player with a mean streak, who came to be regarded as one of the greatest players of all time. The addition of Cobb to an already talented team that included Sam Crawford, Hughie Jennings, Bill Donovan and George Mullin quickly yielded results.

=== 1907 American League Champions ===
Behind the hitting of outfielders Ty Cobb (.350) and Sam Crawford (.323), and the pitching of Bill Donovan and Ed Killian (25 wins each), the Tigers went 92–58 to win the AL pennant in 1907 by 1.5 games over the Philadelphia Athletics. They moved on to their first World Series appearance against the Chicago Cubs.

Game 1 ended in a rare 3–3 tie, called due to darkness after 12 innings. The Tigers scored only three runs in the succeeding four games, never scoring more than one run in a game, and lost the Series, 4–0.

=== 1908 American League Champions ===
The Tigers won the AL by just a half-game over the 90–64 Cleveland Naps with a 90–63 record. Cobb hit .324, while Sam Crawford hit .311 with 7 home runs, which was enough to lead the league in the "dead ball" era.

The Cubs, however, would defeat the Tigers again in the 1908 World Series, this time in five games. This would be the Cubs' last World Championship until 2016.

=== 1909 American League Champions ===
In 1909, Detroit posted a 98–54 season, winning the AL pennant by 3.5 games over the Athletics. Ty Cobb won the batting triple crown in 1909, hitting .377 with 9 home runs (all inside-the-park) and 107 RBIs. He also led the league with 76 stolen bases. George Mullin was the pitching hero, going 29–8 with a 2.22 ERA, while fellow pitcher Ed Willett went 21–10. Mullin's 11–0 start in 1909 was a Tiger record for 104 years, finally being broken by Max Scherzer's 13–0 start in 2013.

It was hoped that a new opponent in the 1909 Series, the Pittsburgh Pirates, would yield different results. The Tigers performed better in the Fall Classic, taking Pittsburgh to seven games, but they were blown out 8–0 in the decisive game at Bennett Park.

=== 1910–1914 ===
The Tigers dropped to third place in the American League in 1910 with an 86–68 record. They posted 89 wins in 1911 to finish second, but were still well behind a powerhouse Philadelphia Athletics team that won 101 games. The team sunk to a dismal sixth place in both the 1912 and 1913 seasons. A bright spot in 1912 was George Mullin pitching the franchise's first no-hitter in a 7–0 win over the St. Louis Browns on July 4, his 32nd birthday.

Cobb went into the stands in a May 15, 1912, game to attack a fan that was abusing him, and was suspended. Three days later, the Tigers protested the suspension by fielding a team of replacement players against the Philadelphia Athletics. They lost 24–2. During this five-season stretch, Cobb posted batting averages of .383, .420, .409, .390 and .368, winning the AL batting title every year.

=== 1915 ===
In 1915, the Tigers won a then-club record 100 games, but narrowly lost the AL pennant to the Boston Red Sox, who won 101 games. The 1915 Tigers were led by an outfield consisting of Ty Cobb, Sam Crawford, and Bobby Veach that finished #1, #2, and #3 in RBIs and total bases. Cobb also set a stolen base record with 96 steals in 1915 that stood until 1962, when it was broken by Maury Wills. Baseball historian Bill James has ranked the 1915 Tigers outfield as the greatest in the history of baseball. The only team in Tigers' history with a better winning percentage than the 1915 squad was the 1934 team that lost the World Series to the St. Louis Cardinals.

=== 1916–1920 ===
The Tigers dropped to third place in 1916 with an 87–67 record, and would remain mired in the middle of the AL standings the rest of the decade, never winning more than 80 games. In the late teens and into the 1920s, Cobb continued to be the marquee player, though he was pushed by budding star outfielder Harry Heilmann, who went on to hit .342 for his career.

Hughie Jennings left the Tigers after the 1920 season, having accumulated 1,131 wins as a manager. This stood as a Tiger record until 1992, when it was broken by Sparky Anderson. Cobb himself took over managerial duties in 1921, but during his six years at the helm, the Tigers topped out at 86 wins and never won a pennant.

=== 1921 ===
In 1921, the Tigers amassed 1,724 hits and a team batting average of .316, the highest team hit total and batting average in AL history. That year, outfielders Harry Heilmann and Ty Cobb finished #1 and #2 in the American League batting race with batting averages of .394 and .389, respectively. The downfall of the 1921 Tigers, however, was the absence of good pitching. The team ERA was 4.40. Without pitching to support the offense, the 1921 Tigers finished in sixth place in the American League at 71–82, 27 games behind the New York Yankees.

On August 19, 1921, Cobb collected his 3,000th career hit off Elmer Myers of the Boston Red Sox. Aged 34 at the time, he is still the youngest player to reach that milestone, also reaching it in the fewest at-bats (8,093).

=== 1922–1926 ===
The Tigers continued to field good teams during Ty Cobb's tenure as player-manager, finishing as high as second in 1923, but lack of quality pitching kept them from winning a pennant. Harry Heilmann hit .403 in 1923, becoming the last AL player to top .400 until Ted Williams hit .406 in 1941. In 1925, Heilmann collected six hits in a season-ending doubleheader to win the batting title, finishing at .393 to Tris Speaker's .389.

Cobb announced his retirement in November 1926 after 22 seasons with the Tigers, though he would return to play two more seasons with the Philadelphia Athletics.

== The Tigers break through (1927–1940) ==
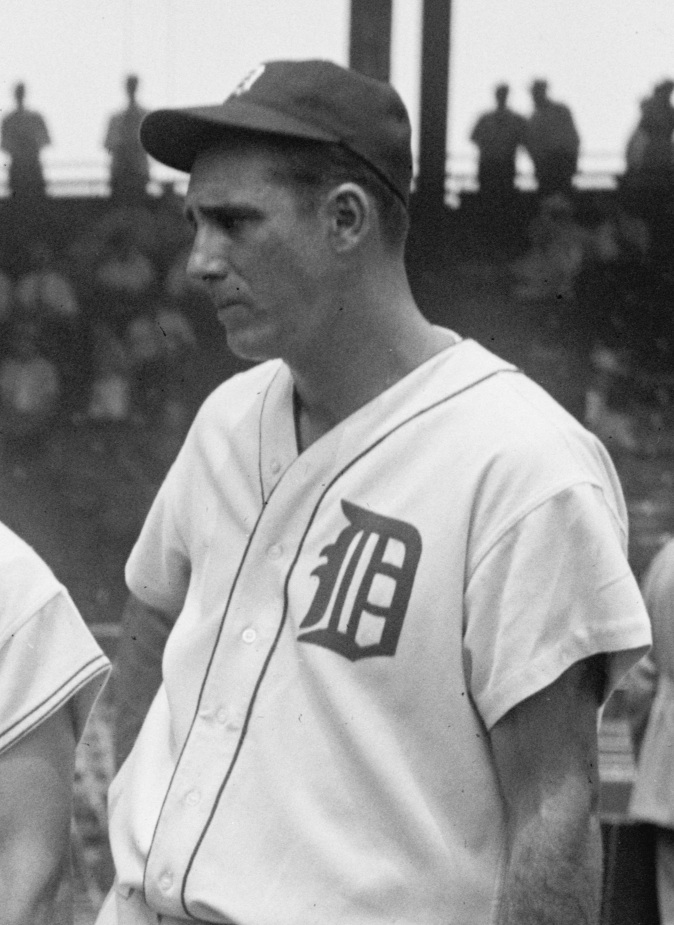
Hall of Famer Hank Greenberg

=== 1927–1933 ===
Though the Tigers struggled with mediocre records in the seven years following Cobb's departure, they were building a solid foundation, adding slugging first baseman Hank Greenberg and pitchers Tommy Bridges and Schoolboy Rowe to a lineup that already included second baseman Charlie Gehringer.

In 1927, Harry Heilmann flirted with a .400 batting average all year, eventually finishing at .398 and winning his fourth AL batting title.

Following the 1933 season, the Tigers added perhaps the final piece of the puzzle, acquiring catcher Mickey Cochrane from the Philadelphia Athletics to serve as player-manager.

=== 1934 American League Champions ===
The Tigers won the 1934 AL pennant with a 101–53 record, at the time a team record for wins, and still the best win percentage (.656) in team history. The Tigers infield (Hank Greenberg and Charlie Gehringer, along with shortstop Billy Rogell and third baseman Marv Owen) accumulated 462 runs during the season, with Gehringer (214 hits, .356 average) leading the way. Schoolboy Rowe led a strong pitching staff, winning 16 straight decisions at one point of the season and finishing with a 24–8 record.

The Tigers would fall in the 1934 World Series in seven games to the "Gashouse Gang" St. Louis Cardinals. After winning a tight battle in Game 5 with a 3–1 decision over Dizzy Dean, Detroit took a 3–2 series lead, but would lose the next two games at Navin Field (Tiger Stadium). For the second time in a World Series Game 7, Detroit folded. St. Louis scored seven times in the third inning off starter Elden Auker and a pair of relievers, while Dean baffled the Tiger hitters en route to an 11–0 victory. The final game was marred by an ugly incident. After spiking Tiger third baseman Marv Owen in the sixth inning, the Cardinals' Joe Medwick had to be removed from the game for his own safety by Commissioner Kenesaw Mountain Landis after being pelted with debris from angry fans in the large temporary bleacher section in left field.

=== 1935 World Series Champions ===
The Tigers 1935 lineup featured four future Hall of Famers (Hank Greenberg, Mickey Cochrane, Goose Goslin and Charlie Gehringer). Though they did not challenge the 1934 team's 101 wins, their 93–58 record was good enough to give them the AL pennant by three games over the New York Yankees. Greenberg was named AL MVP after hitting .328 and leading the league in home runs (36), extra-base hits (98) and RBIs (168). Incredibly, Greenberg's RBI total was 48 higher than the next closest player (Lou Gehrig, with 120). The Tigers also got strong contributions from Gehringer (.330), Cochrane (.319) and starting pitchers Tommy Bridges (21–10) and Elden Auker (18–7).

The Tigers finally won their first World Series, defeating the Chicago Cubs, 4–2. Game 6 concluded with Goslin's dramatic walk-off RBI single, scoring Cochrane for a 4–3 victory.

After owner Frank Navin died in the offseason, Walter Briggs Sr. took over control of the team.

=== 1936–1939 ===
Despite being forecast to win the American League pennant again in 1936, the Tigers fell to a distant second place behind the New York Yankees both that season and in 1937. The team fell further down the standings with an 84–70 record in 1938 and an 81–73 record in 1939. Hank Greenberg nevertheless provided some excitement for Tiger fans in 1938 by challenging the single season home run record held by Babe Ruth (60). He went into the season's final weekend against the Cleveland Indians with 58 home runs, tied with Jimmie Foxx for the most by a right-handed batter at the time, but he failed to homer.

During the final week of the 1938 season, the Tigers presciently held out doubts about a pennant in 1939, but figured that 1940 would be their year.

=== 1940 American League Champions ===
In a tight three-team race, the 90–64 Tigers won the 1940 AL pennant by one game over the Cleveland Indians and two games over the New York Yankees. Prior to the season, first baseman Hank Greenberg was persuaded to move to left field to make room for Rudy York. The move proved successful. York hit .316 with 33 home runs and 134 RBIs. Greenberg batted .340 and slammed 41 home runs while driving in 150. Greenberg won his second AL MVP award, becoming the first major leaguer to win the award at two different positions. Charlie Gehringer batted .313 while collecting 101 walks and scoring 108 runs.

Bobo Newsom was the ace of the Tiger pitching staff in 1940, going 21–5 with a 2.83 ERA. An unlikely hero on the mound this season was 30-year-old rookie Floyd Giebell. Making just his third major league start on September 27, Giebell was called upon to pitch the pennant-clinching game against Bob Feller of the Indians. Feller surrendered just three hits, one being a 2-run homer by Rudy York, while Giebell blanked the Tribe for a 2–0 victory.

The Tigers lost the 1940 World Series to the Cincinnati Reds in seven games. Despite a heroic effort by Bobo Newsom, the Tigers came up short in the deciding game, losing 2–1. Newsom's father had died in a Cincinnati hotel room after watching his son win Game 1. An inspired Newsom won Game 5 and pitched Game 7 on just one day's rest. This was the third time the Tigers had lost a World Series in a deciding seventh game.

== The war years (1941–1945) ==
With Hank Greenberg serving in World War II for all or parts of the 1941–44 seasons, the Tigers struggled to recapture the glory of 1940. They finished no higher than fifth place in 1941–43, but did manage a second-place finish in 1944, largely on the strength of pitchers Hal Newhouser and Dizzy Trout, who won 29 and 27 games, respectively. Newhouser, who was 29–9 with a 2.22 ERA, won the first of his two consecutive AL MVP awards this season. The Tigers were in first place as late as September 18, but would finish one game behind the St. Louis Browns for the AL pennant.

=== 1945 World Series Champions ===
With the end of World War II and the timely return of Hank Greenberg and others from the military, the Tigers won the AL pennant by just 1.5 games over the Washington Senators with an 88–65 record. Hal Newhouser became the first pitcher in the history of the AL (and still the only pitcher as of 2018) to win the MVP Award in two consecutive seasons. Newhouser won the pitching triple crown, leading the AL in wins (25), ERA (1.81) and strikeouts (212).

With Newhouser, Virgil Trucks and Dizzy Trout on the mound and Greenberg leading the Tiger bats, Detroit responded in a World Series Game 7 for the first time, staking Newhouser to a 5–0 lead before he threw a pitch en route to a 9–3 victory over the Cubs. Because many stars had not yet returned from the military, some baseball scholars have deemed the 1945 World Series to be among the worst-played contests in World Series history. For example, prior to the World Series, Chicago sportswriter Warren Brown was asked who he liked, and he answered, "I don't think either one of them can win."

== A long drought (1946–1967) ==
=== 1946–1950 ===
Following their World Series win in 1945, the Tigers continued to have winning records for the remainder of the decade, finishing second in the AL three times, but never winning the pennant.

During the 1946 season, the Tigers acquired George Kell, a third baseman who would become a 10-time all-star and Hall of Famer. He batted over .300 in eight straight seasons (1946–53), and finished with a career .306 average. Kell won the batting title in a very close race with Ted Williams in 1949, going 2-for-3 on the last day of the season to edge out the Red Sox slugger, .34291 to .34276.

The 1950 season was particularly frustrating, as the Tigers posted a 95–59 record for a .617 winning percentage, the fourth best in team history at the time. However, they finished that season three games behind a strong New York Yankees team that went on to sweep the Philadelphia Phillies in the World Series.

=== 1951–1960 ===
Over the next 10 years, the Tigers sank to the middle and lower ranks of the American League. The team had only three winning records over this span and never finished higher than fourth place. The last place 1952 team went 50–104 (.325), which was the worst season in Tigers history until the 2003 team lost 119 games. Despite the dismal season, starter Virgil Trucks threw two no-hitters, becoming only the third pitcher in major league history to accomplished this feat. Also, team owner Walter Briggs Sr. died in 1952. His son Walter Briggs Jr. inherited the team, but he was forced to sell it in 1956 to broadcast media owners John Fetzer and Fred Knorr.

Notwithstanding Detroit's fall in the standings, the decade saw the debut of outfielder Al Kaline in 1953. One of the few major league players who never played a day in the minor leagues, he would hit over .300 nine times in his career. He also made 15 All-Star teams, won 10 Gold Gloves, and featured one of the league's best arms in right field. In 1955, the 20-year-old Kaline hit .340 to become the youngest-ever batting champion in major league history.

1958 saw the Tigers become the second to last team to integrate their roster when Dominican player Ozzie Virgil Sr. joined the team. Only the Boston Red Sox trailed the Tigers in integrating their roster.

=== 1961 ===
As the American League expanded from 8 to 10 teams, Detroit began its slow ascent back to success with an outstanding 1961 campaign. The Tigers won 101 games, a whopping 30-game improvement over the 71–83 1960 team, but still finished eight games behind the Yankees. This marked one of the few times in major league history that a team failed to reach the postseason despite winning 100 or more games, though it had happened once before to the Tigers in 1915. First baseman Norm Cash won the batting title with a .361 average, while teammate Al Kaline finished second. Cash never hit over .286 before or after the 1961 season, and would later say of the accomplishment: "It was a freak. Even at the time, I realized that." Cash's plate heroics, which also included 41 home runs and 132 RBI, might have earned him MVP honors were it not for New York's Roger Maris bashing a then record 61 homers the same season. Cash also drew 124 walks for a league-leading .487 on-base percentage.

The 1961 club featured two non-white starters, Bill Bruton and Jake Wood, and later in the 1960s, black players such as Willie Horton, Earl Wilson, and Gates Brown would contribute to Detroit's rise in the standings.

=== 1962–1966 ===
As a strong nucleus developed, Detroit repeatedly posted winning records throughout the 1960s. In 1963, pitchers Mickey Lolich and Denny McLain entered the rotation. Outfielders Willie Horton (1963), Mickey Stanley (1964) and Jim Northrup (1964) also came aboard around this time.

The team managed a third-place finish during a bizarre 1966 season, in which manager Chuck Dressen and acting manager Bob Swift were both forced to resign their posts because of health problems. Thereafter, Frank Skaff took over the managerial reins until the end of the season. Both Dressen and Swift died during the year; Dressen died of a heart attack in August, while Swift died of lung cancer in October. Following the season, the Tigers hired Mayo Smith to be their new manager.

=== 1967 ===
In 1967, the Tigers were involved in one of the closest pennant races in history. Because of rainouts, the Tigers were forced to play back-to-back doubleheaders against the California Angels over the final two days of the season. They needed to sweep the doubleheader on the last day of the season to force a one-game playoff with the Boston Red Sox. The Tigers won the first game, but lost the second, giving the Red Sox the pennant with no playoff. Detroit finished the season at 91–71, one game behind Boston. Starter Earl Wilson, acquired the previous season from the Red Sox, led the Tigers (and the major leagues) with 22 wins and would form a strong 1–2–3 combination with Denny McLain and Mickey Lolich over the next few years.

== A World Series and the first AL East title (1968–1972) ==
=== Glory in '68: 1968 World Series Champions ===
The Tigers finally returned to the World Series in 1968. The team grabbed first place from the Baltimore Orioles on May 10 and would not relinquish the position, clinching the pennant on September 17 and finishing with a 103–59 record. In a year that was marked by dominant pitching, starter Denny McLain went 31–6 (with a 1.96 ERA), the first time a pitcher had won 30 or more games in a season since Dizzy Dean accomplished the feat in 1934; no pitcher has accomplished it since. McLain won the AL MVP and Cy Young Award for his efforts.

=== 1968 World Series ===
In the 1968 World Series, the Tigers met the defending World Series champion St. Louis Cardinals, led by starter Bob Gibson, who had posted a modern-era record 1.12 ERA during the regular season, and speedy outfielder Lou Brock. This was the first time the Tigers and Cardinals had met in the World Series since 1934. The series was predicated with a bold decision by manager Mayo Smith to play center fielder Mickey Stanley at shortstop, replacing the slick fielding but weak hitting of Ray Oyler. Stanley had never played shortstop before, but was a Gold Glover in the outfield and an excellent athlete. Smith started him at short for the final six games of the regular season and all seven World Series games, with Oyler only appearing as a late-inning defensive replacement. This allowed Smith to play an outfield of Willie Horton, Jim Northrup and Al Kaline in every game.

In Game 1, Gibson completely shut down the Detroit lineup, striking out a World Series record 17 batters en route to an easy 4–0 win. However, due in no small part to pitcher Mickey Lolich's victories in Games 2 and 5, the Tigers climbed back into the World Series. Many fans believe the turning point came in the fifth inning of Game 5, with the Tigers down three games to one, and trailing in the game, 3–2. Left fielder Willie Horton made a perfect throw to home plate to nail Lou Brock, who tried to score from second base standing up, as catcher Bill Freehan blocked the plate with his foot. The Tigers came back with three runs in the seventh to win that game, 5–3, and stay alive. The Cardinals would not threaten to score the rest of this game, and scored only two more meaningless runs over the remainder of the series. In Game 6, McLain ensured a Game 7 by notching his only win of the World Series, a 13–1 blowout, despite pitching on only two days' rest.

In Game 7 at Busch Memorial Stadium, Lolich, also pitching on two days' rest, faced Gibson. Both men pitched brilliantly, putting zeros up on the scoreboard for much of the game. In the bottom of the sixth inning, the Cardinals looked primed to take the lead as Lou Brock singled to lead off the inning, only to be promptly picked off by Lolich. One out later, Curt Flood followed with another single, and was also picked off by Lolich. In the top of the seventh, an exhausted Gibson finally cracked, giving up two-out singles to Norm Cash and Willie Horton. Jim Northrup then struck the decisive blow, lashing a triple to center field over the head of Flood, who appeared to misjudge how hard the ball was hit. That scored both Cash and Horton; Northrup himself was then brought home by a Bill Freehan double. Detroit added an insurance run in the ninth. A solo home run by Mike Shannon was all the Cardinals could muster against Lolich as the Tigers took the game, 4–1, and the World Series, 4–3. The Tigers became only the third team to ever win the World Series after being down 3–1. For his three victories that propelled the Tigers to the championship, Lolich was named the World Series Most Valuable Player. As of 2026, Lolich is the last pitcher to have three complete-game victories in a single World Series.

=== 1969–1971 ===
1969 saw further expansion as both leagues realigned into two divisions of six teams, and the Tigers were placed in the American League East. That year, Detroit failed to defend its title, despite Denny McLain having another outstanding season with a 24–9 campaign, earning him his second straight Cy Young Award (co-winner with Baltimore's Mike Cuellar). The Tigers' 90 wins placed them a distant second in the division to a very strong Baltimore Orioles team, which had won 109 games.

The Tigers suffered a disappointing 1970 season, finishing fourth in the AL East with a 79–83 record. Following the season, Mayo Smith was let go and was replaced by Billy Martin. In a playing career that was primarily spent with the New York Yankees, Martin played his final games with the Minnesota Twins and stayed in that organization after his retirement. He managed the Twins to an AL West Division title in 1969, but was fired after that season due to rocky relationships with his players which included a legendary fight with pitcher Dave Boswell in an alley behind Detroit's Lindell AC sports bar.

Also during the offseason, Denny McLain, who had been suspended three times and had a 3–5 record, was part of an eight-player deal with the Washington Senators in what would turn out to be a heist for Detroit. The Tigers acquired pitcher Joe Coleman, shortstop Eddie Brinkman and third baseman Aurelio Rodríguez.

Martin's Tigers posted 91 wins in 1971. However, they had to settle for a second-place finish behind the Orioles, who won 101 games to take their third straight AL East Division crown. The season was highlighted by Mickey Lolich's 308 strikeouts, which led the AL and is still the single-season record in franchise history. Lolich also won 25 games and posted a 2.92 ERA while throwing an incredible 376 innings and completing 29 of his 45 starts. Coleman paid immediate dividends for Detroit, winning 20 games, while McLain went 10–22 for the Senators and was out of baseball by age 29.

=== 1972 AL East Champions ===
Joe Coleman, Eddie Brinkman and Aurelio Rodríguez all played critical roles in 1972, when the Tigers captured their first AL East division title. Oddities of the schedule due to an early season strike allowed the 86–70 Tigers to win the division by just ½ game. Brinkman was named Tiger of the Year by the Detroit Baseball Writers, despite a .203 batting average, as he committed just 7 errors in 728 chances (.990 fielding percentage) and had a 72-game errorless streak during the season. Mickey Lolich was his steady self for the Tigers, winning 22 games with a sparkling 2.50 ERA, while Coleman won 19 and had a 2.80 ERA. Starter Woodie Fryman, acquired on August 2, was the final piece of the puzzle as he went 10–3 over the last two months of the regular season and posted a minuscule 2.06 ERA. Fryman was also the winning pitcher in the division-clinching game against the Boston Red Sox, a 3–1 victory on October 3.

=== 1972 ALCS ===
In the 1972 American League Championship Series, Detroit faced the American League West division champion Oakland Athletics, who had become steadily competitive ever since the 1969 realignment. In Game 1 of the ALCS in Oakland, Mickey Lolich, the hero of '68, took the hill and allowed just one run over nine innings. The Athletics' ace, Catfish Hunter, matched Lolich, surrendering only a solo home run to Norm Cash, and the game went into extra innings. Al Kaline hit a solo homer to break a 1–1 tie in the top of the 11th inning, only to be charged with a throwing error on Gonzalo Marquez's game-tying single in the bottom half of the frame that allowed Gene Tenace to score the winning run. Blue Moon Odom shut down Detroit 5–0 in Game 2. The end of Game 2 was marred by an ugly incident in which Tigers reliever Lerrin LaGrow hit A's shortstop and leadoff hitter Bert Campaneris on the ankle with a pitch. An angered Campaneris threw the bat at LaGrow, and LaGrow ducked just in time for the bat to sail over his head. Both benches cleared, and though no punches were thrown, both LaGrow and Campaneris were suspended for the remainder of the series. It was widely believed that Martin had ordered the pitch that hit Campaneris, who had three hits, two stolen bases and two runs scored in the game.

As the series shifted to Detroit, the Tigers caught their stride. Joe Coleman held the A's scoreless on seven hits in Game 3, striking out 14 batters in a 3–0 victory for the Tigers. Game 4 was another pitchers' duel between Hunter and Lolich, resulting again in a 1–1 tie at the end of nine innings. Oakland scored two runs in the top of the 10th and put the Tigers down to their last three outs. Detroit pushed two runs across the plate to tie the game before Jim Northrup came through in the clutch again. His single off Dave Hamilton scored Gates Brown to give the Tigers a 4–3 win and even the series at two games apiece.

A first inning run on an RBI ground out from Bill Freehan, set up by a Gene Tenace passed ball that allowed Dick McAuliffe to reach third, gave Detroit an early lead in the deciding fifth and final game in Detroit. Reggie Jackson's steal of home in the second inning tied it up, though Jackson was injured in a collision with Freehan and had to leave the game. Tenace's two-out single to left field plated George Hendrick to give Oakland a 2–1 lead in the fourth inning. The run was controversial to many Tigers fans, as Hendrick was ruled safe at first base two batters prior to the Tenace hit. Hendrick appeared to be out by two steps on a grounder to short, but umpire John Rice ruled that Norm Cash pulled his foot off first base. Replays and photos, however, show that Cash did not pull his foot. Thanks to that play and four innings of scoreless relief from Vida Blue, the A's took the AL pennant and a spot in the World Series, which they eventually won (they would win two more consecutively).

== A slow decline (1973–1978) ==
The 1973 season saw the Tigers drop to third place in the division, with an 85–77 record. Joe Coleman posted another 23 wins, but the other Tiger starters had subpar seasons. Willie Horton hit .316, but injuries limited him to just 111 games. Jim Northrup posted the best batting average of his career (.307) but was inexplicably limited to part-time duty (119 games played), which Northrup attributed to an ongoing feud with Billy Martin that had actually started in the 1972 ALCS. Northrup even proclaimed to the press that Martin "took the fun out of the game." Martin did not survive the 1973 season as manager. He was fired that September after ordering his pitchers to throw spitballs (and telling the press that he did so) in protest of opposing Cleveland Indians pitcher Gaylord Perry, whom Martin was convinced was doing the same. Third base coach Joe Schultz served as interim manager for the remainder of the season.

A bright spot for the Tigers in 1973 was relief pitcher John Hiller, who marked his first full season since suffering a heart attack in 1971 by collecting a league-leading 38 saves and posting a brilliant 1.44 ERA. Hiller's saves total would stand as a Tiger record until 2000, when it was broken by Todd Jones' 42 saves (Jones' record would later be broken by José Valverde's 49 saves in 2011).

After the season, the Tigers hired Ralph Houk to be their new manager. Houk served in that capacity for five full seasons, through the end of the 1978 season. The roster of players who played under Houk were mostly aging veterans from the 1960s, whose performance had slipped from their peak years. The Tigers did not have a winning season from 1974 to 1977, and their 57 wins in the 1975 season was the team's lowest since 1952. Perhaps the biggest signal of decline for the Tigers was the retirement of Kaline following the 1974 season, after he notched his 3,000th career hit. Kaline finished with 3,007 hits and was elected to the Baseball Hall of Fame in his first year of eligibility in 1980.

=== 1976: The Year of The Bird ===
Tiger fans were provided a glimmer of hope when 21-year-old rookie Mark Fidrych made his debut in 1976. Fidrych, known as "The Bird", was a colorful character known for talking to the baseball and other eccentricities. During a game against the Yankees, Graig Nettles responded to Fidrych's antics by talking to his bat. After making an out, he later lamented that his Japanese-made bat did not understand him. Fidrych entered the All-Star break at 9–2 with a 1.78 ERA, and was the starting pitcher for the American League in the All-Star Game played that year in Philadelphia to celebrate the American Bicentennial. He finished the season with a record of 19–9 and an American League-leading ERA of 2.34. Fidrych, the AL Rookie of the Year, was one of the few bright spots that year with the Tigers finishing next to last in the AL East in 1976.

Aurelio Rodríguez won the Gold Glove Award in 1976 at third base, snapping a streak in which Hall of Famer Brooks Robinson had won it for 16 consecutive seasons.

=== 1977–1978 ===
Injuries to his knee, and later his arm, drastically limited Fidrych's appearances in 1977–78. Perhaps more important, however, was the talent coming up through the Detroit farm system at the time, as Jack Morris, Lance Parrish, Alan Trammell and Lou Whitaker all made their debuts in 1977. Highlighted by Whitaker's Rookie of the Year season, the Tigers would win 86 games in 1978, the only winning campaign under Houk.

== The "Bless You Boys" era (1979–1987) ==
Houk's immediate successor as Tiger manager in 1979 was Les Moss, but Moss would only last until June of that year. From June 14, 1979, until the end of the 1995 season, the team was managed by George "Sparky" Anderson, one of baseball's winningest managers and owner of two World Series rings as manager of the Cincinnati Reds during their peak as The Big Red Machine in the 1970s. When Anderson joined the Tigers in 1979 and assessed the team's young talent, he boldly predicted that it would be a pennant winner within five years.

Acerbic sports anchor Al Ackerman initiated the phrase "Bless You Boys". Originally used as a sarcastic remark, Ackerman's phrase would take on a new meaning in 1984.

=== The Roar of '84: 1984 World Series Champions ===
As in 1968, the Tigers' next World Series season would be preceded by a disappointing second-place finish, as the 1983 Tigers won 92 games to finish six games behind the Baltimore Orioles in the AL East.

The first major news of the 1984 season actually came in late 1983, when broadcasting magnate John Fetzer, who had owned the Tigers since 1957, sold the team to Domino's Pizza founder and CEO Tom Monaghan for $53 million.

The 1984 team got off to a 9–0 start highlighted by Jack Morris tossing a nationally televised no-hitter against Chicago in the fourth game of the season. They stayed hot for most of the year, posting a 35–5 record over their first forty games and cruising to a franchise-record 104 victories. The Tigers led the division from opening day until the end of the regular season and finished a staggering 15 games ahead of the second-place Toronto Blue Jays. Closer Willie Hernández, acquired from the 1983 NL champion Philadelphia Phillies in the offseason, won both the Cy Young Award and AL MVP, a rarity for a relief pitcher.

=== 1984 ALCS ===
The Tigers faced the Kansas City Royals in the American League Championship Series. In Game 1, Alan Trammell, Lance Parrish and Larry Herndon went deep to crush the Royals 8–1 at Royals Stadium (now Kauffman Stadium). In Game 2, the Tigers scored twice in the 11th inning when Johnny Grubb doubled off Royals closer Dan Quisenberry en route to a 5–3 victory. The Tigers completed the sweep at Tiger Stadium in Game 3. Marty Castillo's third-inning RBI fielder's choice would be all the help Detroit would need. Milt Wilcox outdueled Charlie Leibrandt, and after Hernandez got Darryl Motley to pop out to preserve the 1–0 win, the Tigers were returning to the World Series.

=== 1984 World Series ===
In the NLCS, the San Diego Padres rallied from losing the first two games to overcome the Chicago Cubs and prevent a fifth Cubs-Tigers series. The Tigers would open the 1984 World Series on the road in San Diego.

In Game 1, Larry Herndon hit a two-run home run that gave the Tigers a 3–2 lead. Jack Morris pitched a complete game with 2 runs on 8 hits, and Detroit drew first blood. The Padres evened the series the next night despite pitcher Ed Whitson being chased after pitching 2/3 of an inning and giving up three runs on five Tiger hits. Tiger starter Dan Petry exited the game after 4 1/3 innings when Kurt Bevacqua's three-run homer gave San Diego a 5–3 lead they would hold onto.

When the series shifted to the Motor City, the Tigers took command. In Game 3, a two-out rally in the second inning, highlighted by Marty Castillo's 2-run homer, led to four runs and the yanking of Padre starter Tim Lollar after 1 2/3 innings. The Padres never recovered, losing 5–2. Eric Show continued the parade of bad outings in Game 4, getting bounced after 2 2/3 innings upon giving up home runs to World Series MVP Alan Trammell in his first two at-bats. Trammell's homers held up with the help of another Morris complete game, and the Tigers' 4–2 win gave them a commanding lead in the series.

In Game 5, Kirk Gibson's two-run shot in the first inning would be the beginning of another early end for the Padres' starter Mark Thurmond. Though the Padres would pull back even at 3–3, chasing Petry in the fourth inning in the process, the Tigers retook the lead on a Rusty Kuntz sacrifice fly (actually a pop-out to retreating second baseman Alan Wiggins that the speedy Gibson was able to score on), and then went up 5–3 on a solo homer by Parrish.

A "Sounds of the Game" video was made during the Series by MLB Productions and played on TV a number of times since then. Gibson came to bat in the eighth inning with runners on second and third and the Tigers clinging to a 5–4 lead. Padres manager Dick Williams was shown in the dugout flashing four fingers, ordering an intentional walk, before San Diego reliever Goose Gossage summoned him to the mound. Sparky Anderson was seen and heard yelling to Gibson, "He don't want to walk you!", and making a swing-the-bat gesture. As Anderson had suspected, Gossage threw a 1–0 fastball on the inside corner, and Gibson was ready. He launched the pitch into Tiger Stadium's right field upper deck for a three-run homer, effectively clinching the game and the series.

Aurelio López pitched 2 1/3 innings of relief and retired all seven batters he faced, earning the win. Despite allowing a rare run in the top of the 8th inning, Willie Hernández got the save as Tony Gwynn flew out to Larry Herndon to end the game, sending Detroit into a wild victory celebration.

The Tigers led their division wire-to-wire, from opening day and every day thereafter, culminating in the World Series championship. This had not been done in the major leagues since the 1955 Brooklyn Dodgers. With the win, Anderson became the first manager to win the World Series in both leagues.

=== 1987 AL East Champions ===
After a pair of third-place finishes in 1985 and 1986, the 1987 Tigers faced lowered expectations – which seemed to be confirmed by an 11–19 start to the season. However, the team hit its stride thereafter and gradually gained ground on its AL East rivals. This charge was fueled in part by the acquisition of pitcher Doyle Alexander from the Atlanta Braves in exchange for minor league pitcher John Smoltz. Alexander started 11 games for the Tigers, posting a 9–0 record and a 1.53 ERA. Smoltz, a Michigan native, went on to have a long and productive career, mostly with the Braves, and was ultimately inducted into the Baseball Hall of Fame in 2015. Despite the Tigers' great season, they entered September neck-and-neck with the Toronto Blue Jays. The two teams would square off in seven hard-fought games during the final two weeks of the season. All seven games were decided by one run, and in the first six of the seven games, the winning run was scored in the final inning of play. At Exhibition Stadium, the Tigers dropped three in a row to the Blue Jays before winning a dramatic extra-inning showdown.

The Tigers entered the final week of the 1987 season 2.5 games behind. After a series against the Baltimore Orioles, the Tigers returned home trailing by a game and swept the Blue Jays. Detroit clinched the division in a 1–0 victory over Toronto in front of 51,000 fans at Tiger Stadium on October 4. Frank Tanana went all nine innings for the complete game shutout, and outfielder Larry Herndon gave the Tigers their lone run on a second-inning home run. Detroit finished the season two games ahead of Toronto, securing the best record in the majors (98–64).

In what would prove to be their last postseason appearance until 2006, the Tigers were upset in the 1987 American League Championship Series by the 85–77 Minnesota Twins (who in turn won the World Series that year) 4–1. The Twins clinched the series in Game 5 at Tiger Stadium, 9–5.

== A new approach (1988–1995) ==
Despite their 1987 division title victory, the Tigers proved unable to build on their success. The team lost Kirk Gibson to free agency in the offseason, but still spent much of 1988 in first place in the AL East. A late-season slump left the team in second place at 88–74, one game behind the Boston Red Sox. In 1989, the team collapsed to a 59–103 record, worst in the majors.

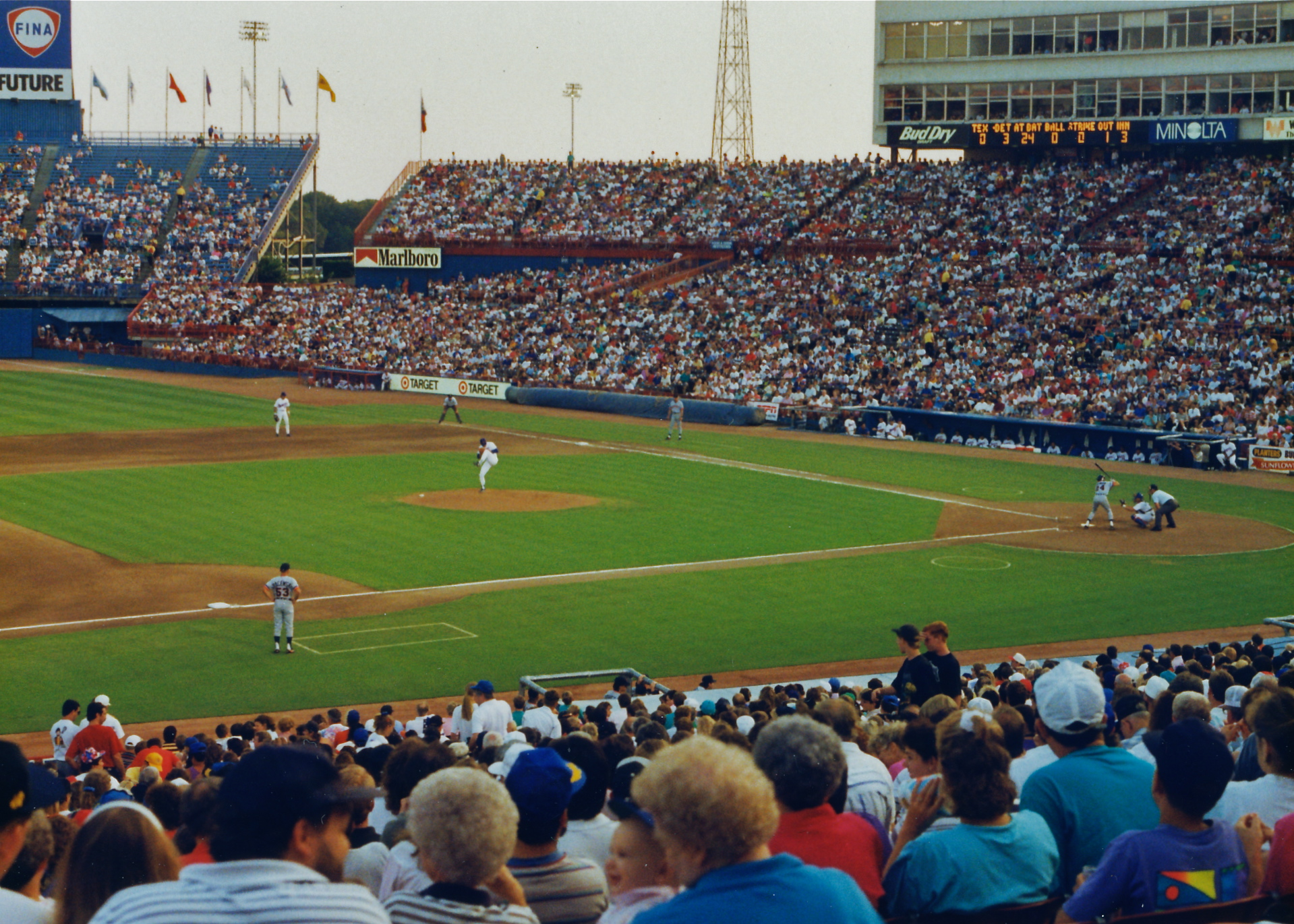
The Tigers playing against the Texas Rangers during a 1992 away game at Arlington Stadium

The franchise then attempted to rebuild using a power-hitting approach, with sluggers Cecil Fielder, Rob Deer, and Mickey Tettleton joining Trammell and Whitaker in the lineup (fitting for the team with the most 200+ home run seasons in baseball history). In 1990, Fielder led the American League with 51 home runs (becoming the first player to hit 50 since George Foster in 1977, and the first AL player since Roger Maris and Mickey Mantle in 1961), and finished second in the voting for AL MVP. He hit 44 home runs and collected 132 RBI in 1991, again finishing second in the AL MVP balloting. Behind the hitting of Fielder and others, the Tigers improved by 20 wins in 1990 (79–83), and posted a winning record in 1991 (84–78). However, the team lacked quality pitching, despite Bill Gullickson's 20 wins in 1991, and its core of key players began to age, setting the franchise up for decline. Detroit's minor league system was largely barren of talent as well, producing only a few everyday players during the 1990s. Adding insult to injury, in December 1990 the Tigers and radio station WJR announced that they were not renewing the contract of long-time Hall of Fame play-by play announcer Ernie Harwell, and that the 1991 season would be Harwell's last with the team. The announcement was met with resounding fan protests, both in Michigan and around the baseball world.

1992 saw the Tigers win only 75 games, with Fielder being one of the few bright spots as he won the AL RBI title for a third straight season (124). In August 1992, the franchise was sold to Mike Ilitch, the president and CEO of Little Caesars Pizza who also owned the Detroit Red Wings. One of Ilitch's first priorities as the new owner was to rehire Ernie Harwell. Late in the season, Sparky Anderson won his 1,132nd game as a Tiger manager, passing Hughie Jennings for the most all-time wins in franchise history. The team also responded with an 85–77 season in 1993, but it would be their last winning season for almost a decade and a half.

On October 2, 1995, Sparky Anderson chose to not only end his career with the Tigers, but retire from baseball altogether.

== Randy Smith era (1996–2002) ==
From 1994 to 2005, the Tigers did not post a winning record, the longest sub-.500 stretch in franchise history. In 1996, they lost a then-team record 109 games, under new general manager Randy Smith. The only team in the majors to have a longer stretch without a winning season during this time were the Pittsburgh Pirates, who failed to post a winning record from 1993 to 2012. The Tigers' best record over this span was 79–83, recorded in 1997 and 2000.

In 1998, the Tigers moved from the AL East, where they had been since the AL and NL split into divisions in 1969, to the AL Central as part of a realignment necessitated by the addition of the expansion Tampa Bay Devil Rays.

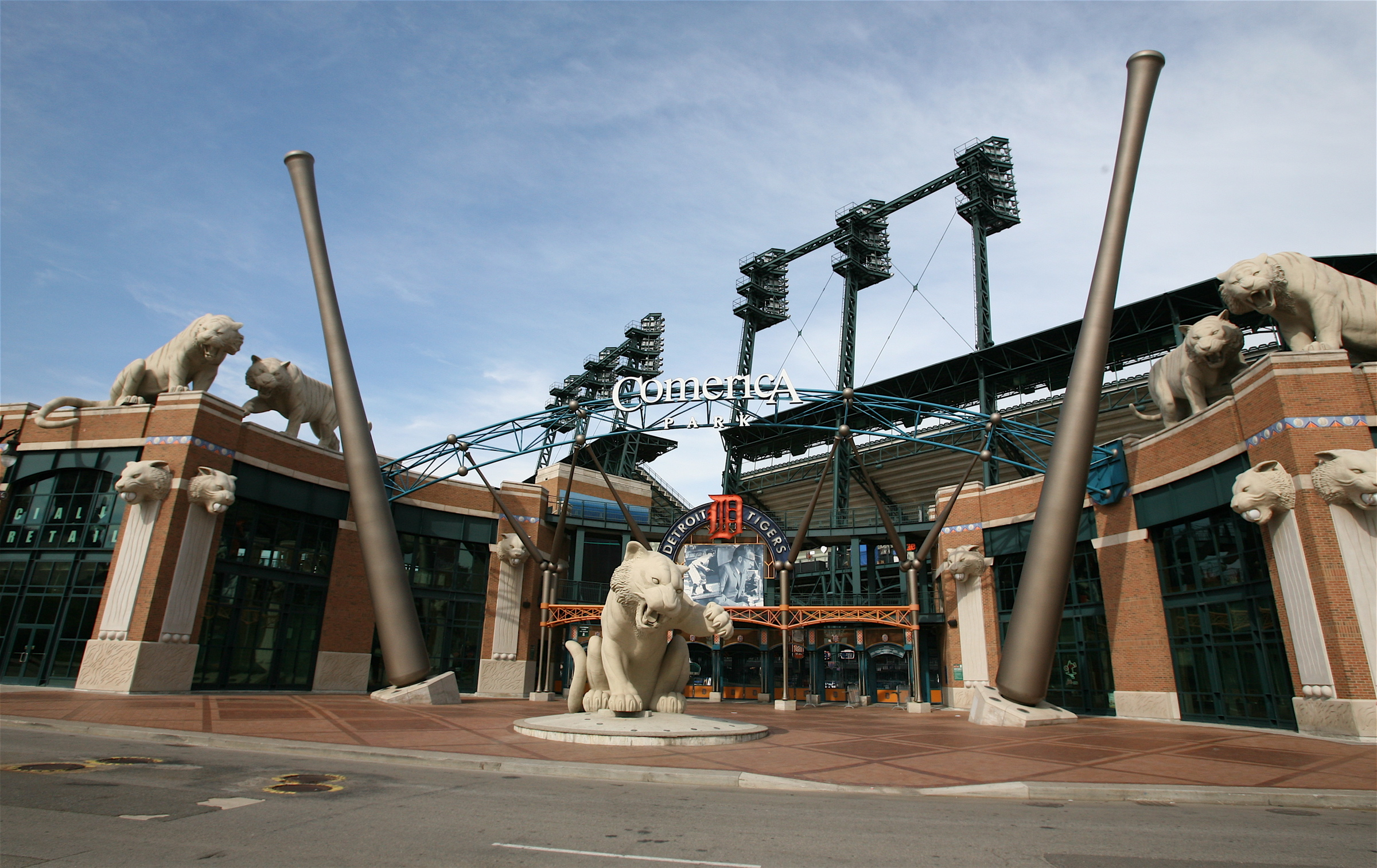
The entrance sign of Comerica Park

In 2000, the team left Tiger Stadium in favor of Comerica Park.

Soon after it opened, Comerica Park drew criticism for its deep dimensions, which made it difficult to hit home runs; the distance to left-center field (395 ft), in particular, was seen as unfair to hitters. This led to the nickname "Comerica National Park". The team made a successful bid to bring in slugger Juan González from the Texas Rangers for the inaugural season at Comerica Park. After four consecutive seasons of no fewer than 39 home runs, González only hit 22 homers in 2000. He cited Comerica Park's dimensions as a major reason why he turned down a multiyear contract extension. In 2003, the franchise largely quieted the criticism by moving in the left-center fence to 370 feet (110 m), taking the flagpole in that area out of play, a feature carried over from Tiger Stadium. In 2005, the team moved the bullpens to the vacant area beyond the left field fence and filled the previous location with seats.

In late 2001, Dave Dombrowski, former general manager of the 1997 World Series champion Florida Marlins, was hired as team president. In 2002, the Tigers started the season 0–6, prompting Dombrowski to fire the unpopular Smith, as well as manager Phil Garner. Dombrowski then took over as general manager and named bench coach Luis Pujols to finish the season as interim manager. The team finished 55–106. After the season was over, Pujols was let go.

== Most losses in franchise history (2003) ==
Dave Dombrowski hired popular former shortstop Alan Trammell to manage the team in 2003. With fellow 1984 teammates Kirk Gibson and Lance Parrish on the coaching staff, the rebuilding process began. On August 30, 2003, the Tigers' defeat at the hands of the Chicago White Sox caused them to join the 1962 New York Mets, who were a first-year expansion team, as the only modern MLB teams to lose 100 games before September. They avoided tying the 1962 Mets' then modern MLB record of 120 losses only by winning five of their last six games of the season, including three out of four against the Minnesota Twins, who had already clinched the AL Central and were resting their stars.

Mike Maroth went 9–21, becoming the first pitcher to lose 20 games since Brian Kingman lost 20 for the Oakland Athletics in 1980. Maroth, Jeremy Bonderman (6–19), and Nate Cornejo (6–17) were the top three pitchers in losses in the entire major leagues, the first time in history that this had occurred. (Note: The 1952 Tigers had the top three losers in the AL, but not the major leagues.)

The Tigers finished 43–119, the worst record in franchise history. This eclipsed the previous AL record of 117 losses set by the 1916 Philadelphia Athletics, which was later surpassed by the 2024 Chicago White Sox. While the 2003 Tigers rank as the fourth worst team in major league history based on total losses, they fare slightly better based on winning percentage. Their .265 win percentage is the majors' seventh-worst since 1900.

== Rebuilding the franchise (2004–2006) ==
After the embarrassing 2003 season, the Tigers vowed to make changes. Under Dave Dombrowski, the franchise demonstrated a willingness to sign marquee free agents. In 2004, the team signed or traded for several talented but high-risk veterans, such as Fernando Viña, Rondell White, Iván Rodríguez, Ugueth Urbina, and Carlos Guillén, and the gamble paid off. The 2004 Tigers finished 72–90, a 29-game improvement over the previous season. This was the largest improvement in the AL since the Baltimore Orioles had a 33-game improvement from 1988 to 1989.

Prior to the 2005 season, the Tigers spent a large sum for two prized free agents, Troy Percival and Magglio Ordóñez. On June 8, 2005, the Tigers traded pitcher Ugueth Urbina and infielder Ramón Martínez to the Philadelphia Phillies for Plácido Polanco. The Tigers stayed on the fringes of contention for the AL wild card for the first four months of the season, but then faded badly, finishing 71–91. The collapse was perceived as being due both to injuries and to a lack of player unity; Rodríguez in particular was disgruntled, taking a leave of absence during the season to deal with a difficult divorce. Trammell, though popular with the fans, took part of the blame for the poor clubhouse atmosphere and lack of continued improvement, and he was fired at the end of the season.

A highlight of the 2005 campaign was Detroit's hosting of the Major League Baseball All-Star Game, its first since 1971. In the Home Run Derby, Rodríguez finished second, losing to the Phillies' Bobby Abreu.

In October 2005, Jim Leyland, who managed Dombrowski's 1997 World Series champion Florida Marlins, replaced Trammell as manager; two months later, in response to Troy Percival's arm problems, closer Todd Jones, who had spent five seasons in Detroit (1997–2001), signed a two-year deal to return to the Tigers. Veteran left-hander Kenny Rogers also joined the Tigers from the Texas Rangers in late 2005.

=== The return of the Tigers: 2006 American League Champions ===
After years of futility, the 2006 season showed signs of hope. The impressive rookie campaigns of eventual AL Rookie of the Year Justin Verlander, centerfielder Curtis Granderson, and flamethrowing relief pitcher Joel Zumaya, coupled with a well-publicized early-season tirade by Leyland, helped the team explode and quickly rise to the top of the AL Central. The team reached a high point when they were 40 games over .500, but a second half swoon started to raise questions about the team's staying power. On August 27, a 7–1 victory over the Cleveland Indians gave the Tigers their 82nd victory and their first winning season since 1993. On September 24, the Tigers beat the Kansas City Royals 11–4 to clinch their first playoff berth since 1987. A division title seemed inevitable. All that was required was one win in the final five games of the season, which included three games against the Royals, whom the Tigers had manhandled much of the season. However, the Tigers lost all five games to finish 95–67, and the division title went to the 96–66 Minnesota Twins. The Tigers instead settled for the AL wild card.

The playoffs saw the Tigers beat the heavily favored New York Yankees 3–1 in the ALDS and sweep the Oakland Athletics in the 2006 ALCS, thanks to a walk-off home run in Game 4 by right fielder Magglio Ordóñez. They advanced to the World Series, where they lost to the underdog St. Louis Cardinals in five games.

== Falling short (2007–2010) ==
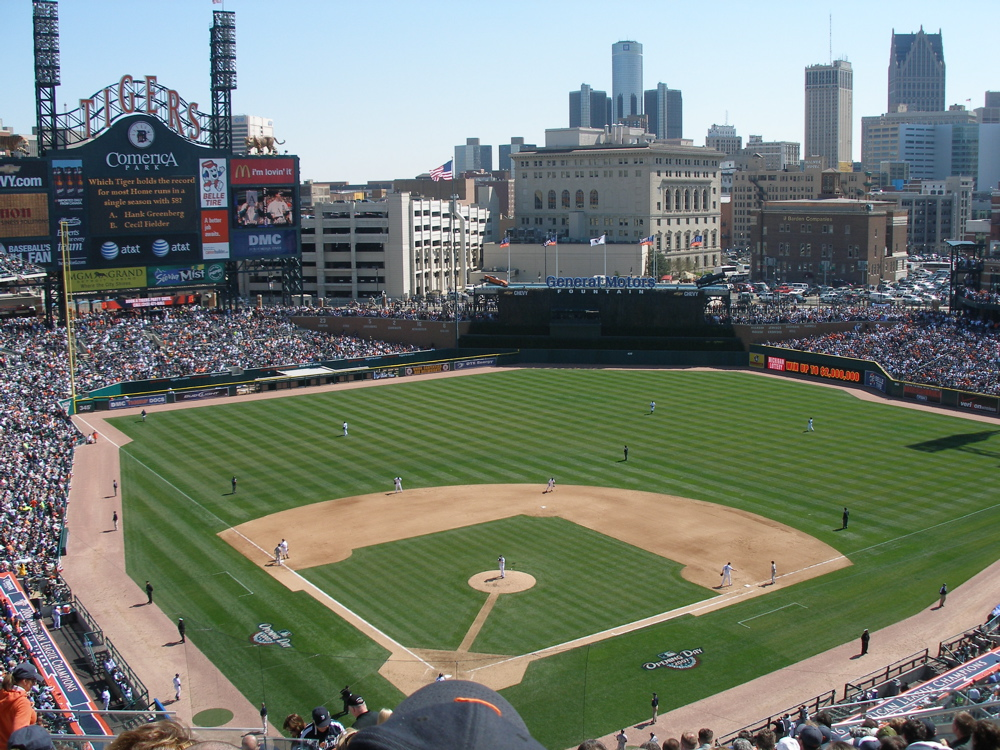
Tigers opening day 2007; view from section 324

=== 2007 ===
During the offseason, the Tigers traded for outfielder Gary Sheffield, who had been a part of the 1997 World Series champion Florida Marlins managed by Jim Leyland. In addition to acquisitions, Dombrowski developed a productive farm system. Justin Verlander and Joel Zumaya, the most notable rookie contributors to the 2006 team, were followed by Andrew Miller, who was drafted in 2006 and called up early in the 2007 campaign, and minor leaguer Cameron Maybin, an athletic five-tool outfielder ranked #6 in Baseball America's 2007 Top 100 Prospects.

On June 12, Verlander threw the Tigers' first no-hitter since 1984 (Jack Morris) and the first in Comerica Park history, in a 4–0 win over the Milwaukee Brewers. The Tigers had the best record in baseball in late July, but lost a few players to injuries and started to play poorly in the second half. The Tigers were officially eliminated from playoff competition on September 26, 2007, when the New York Yankees clinched a wild card berth. The Tigers, at 88–74, finished second in the AL Central.

Magglio Ordóñez captured the AL batting title in 2007 with a .363 average, becoming the first Tiger to win it since Norm Cash did so in 1961.

=== 2008 ===
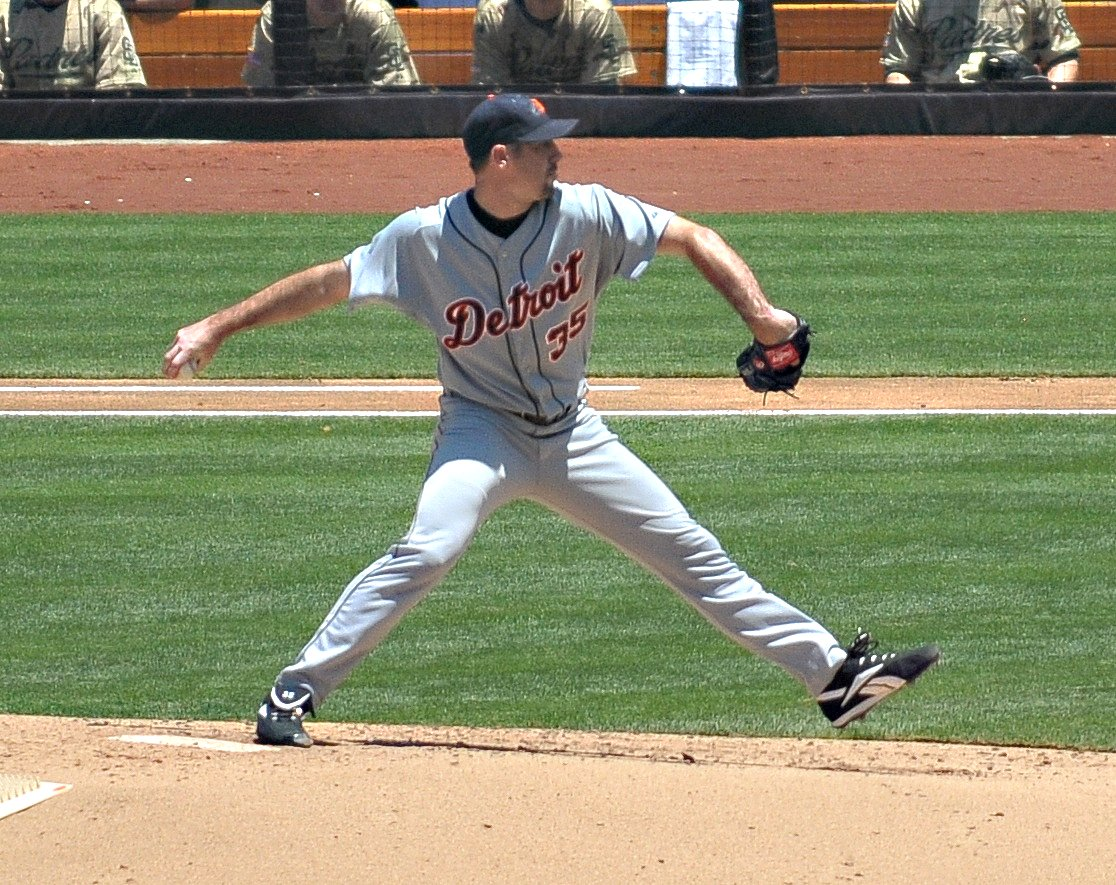
Justin Verlander, June 2008

Going into the 2008 season, the franchise traded for prominent talent in Édgar Rentería (from the Atlanta Braves) and Miguel Cabrera and Dontrelle Willis (from the Florida Marlins). However, the Tigers, who now boasted the second-highest team payroll in the majors at over $138 million, began the regular season by losing seven straight games. The Tigers climbed back, and at the midway point of the season, they were 42–40. In the end, the team finished miserably, slumping to a 74–88 record. Justin Verlander finished with his worst season as a pro, as he went 11–17 with a 4.84 ERA. The Tigers also lost closer Todd Jones to retirement on September 25, 2008. Despite the disappointing season, the team set an attendance record in 2008, drawing 3,202,654 customers to Comerica Park.

=== 2009 ===
Going into the 2009 season, the Tigers acquired starter Edwin Jackson from the 2008 AL Champion Tampa Bay Rays, and called up rookie and former #1 draft pick Rick Porcello. Jackson was outstanding in the first half, making his first All-Star team, while Porcello was solid most of the year, posting a 14–9 record with a 3.96 ERA and displaying grit and maturity beyond his 20 years of age. Justin Verlander bounced back from an off 2008 to win 19 games. He posted a 3.45 ERA and led the AL in strikeouts (269) to finish third in the AL Cy Young balloting. Fernando Rodney assumed the closer role in spring training, replacing the retired Todd Jones. Rodney responded with 37 saves in 38 tries, while Bobby Seay, Fu-Te Ni, Brandon Lyon, and Ryan Perry shored up the middle relief that plagued the team in 2007–08.

Despite the improvements, the Tigers once again found themselves struggling to hold a lead in the AL Central. The team entered September with a 7-game lead in the division, but wound up tied with the Minnesota Twins at 86 wins by the final day of the regular season. The season ended on October 6 with a 6–5 loss in 12 innings to the Twins in the tie-breaker game, leaving the Tigers with an 86–77 record. The Tigers spent 146 days of the 2009 season in first place, but became the first team in Major League history to lose a three-game lead with four games left to play.

=== 2010 ===
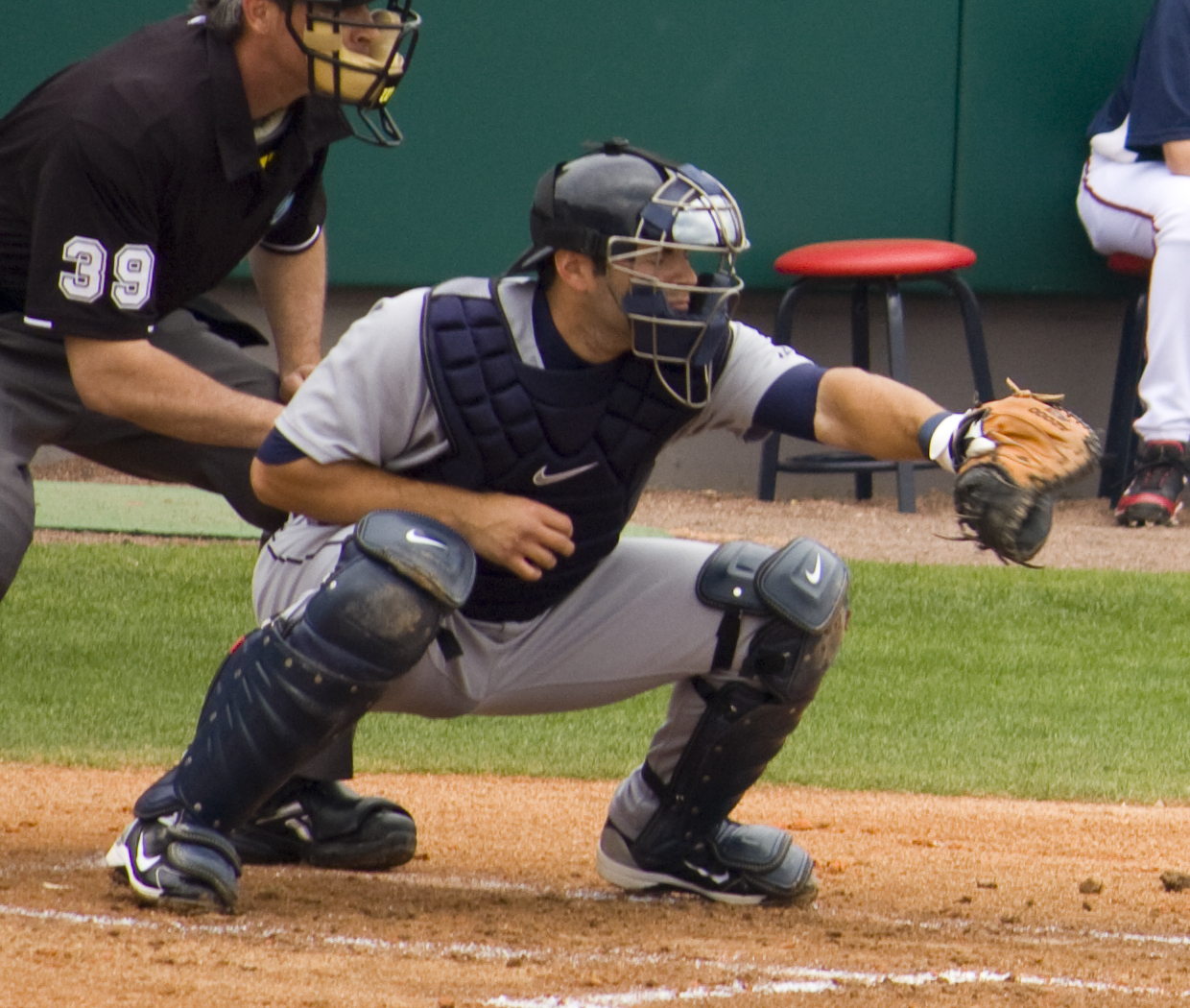
Alex Avila, March 2010

Entering 2010, the Tigers parted ways with Curtis Granderson and Edwin Jackson as part of a three-way trade with the New York Yankees and Arizona Diamondbacks; in return they picked up outfield prospect Austin Jackson and pitchers Phil Coke, Max Scherzer and Daniel Schlereth. Jackson made the Tigers opening day roster, and was American League Rookie of the Month for April. 2010 also saw the debut of Brennan Boesch, who was named the AL Rookie of the Month for May and June.

At the All-Star break, the Tigers were a half-game out of first place in the AL Central, behind the Chicago White Sox. However, a slow start after the break and injuries to three key players sent the Tigers into yet another second half tailspin. The Tigers finished the season in third place with an 81–81 record, 13 games back of the division-winning Minnesota Twins. While playing outstanding baseball at home, the Tigers were just 29–52 on the road.

Among the season highlights were Miguel Cabrera hitting .328 with 38 home runs and an AL-best 126 RBI, earning the AL Silver Slugger Award at first base and finishing second in the AL MVP race (earning 5 of 28 first-place votes). Jackson (.293 average, 103 runs, 181 hits, 27 stolen bases) finished second in the AL Rookie of the Year voting. Justin Verlander enjoyed another strong season (18–9 record, 3.37 ERA, 219 strikeouts).

=== The near-perfect game ===
On June 2, 2010, Armando Galarraga was pitching a perfect game against the Cleveland Indians with 2 outs in the top of the ninth inning when first base umpire Jim Joyce made a controversial call, ruling Jason Donald safe at first. Video replay showed he was out. A tearful Joyce later said, "I just cost that kid a perfect game. I thought he beat the throw. I was convinced he beat the throw, until I saw the replay." Galarraga would later tell reporters that Joyce apologized to him directly and gave him a hug. The next day, with Joyce umpiring home plate, Galarraga brought out the lineup card and the two shook hands. Despite nationwide support for overturning the call, which included supportive statements from the Governor of Michigan and the White House, commissioner Bud Selig let the call stand. However, he said he would look into expanding instant replay in the future.

== Division winners (2011–2014) ==
=== 2011: First AL Central Championship ===
The Tigers returned much of their roster from 2010, while adding relief pitcher Joaquín Benoit, catcher/DH Victor Martinez, and starting pitcher Brad Penny.

On May 7, Verlander took a perfect game against the Toronto Blue Jays into the 8th inning. After a walk to J. P. Arencibia, Verlander coaxed a double play grounder and went on to the 9th inning to complete his second career no-hitter by facing the minimum 27 batters. It was the seventh no-hitter in Tigers history. On August 27, Verlander defeated the Minnesota Twins, 6–4, to become the first Tiger since Bill Gullickson in 1991 to win 20 games in a season. Verlander also became the first major league pitcher since Curt Schilling in 2002 to reach 20 wins before the end of August.

In May, the Tigers were as many as eight games back of the first place Cleveland Indians. However, they would start to play better.

The Tigers sent five players to the 2011 All-Star Game. Catcher Alex Avila was voted in as a starter, while Justin Verlander, José Valverde and Miguel Cabrera were added as reserves. Verlander was unavailable to play in the All-Star Game due to the rule where starting pitchers who play the Sunday beforehand are ineligible. Shortstop Jhonny Peralta was later added to the All-Star team when the Yankees' Derek Jeter was unable to play due to injury.

As a three-way battle for the division title developed between the Tigers, Indians, and Chicago White Sox, the Tigers put together an 18–10 record in August to begin to pull away. Starter Doug Fister, who was acquired at the trade deadline, provided an immediate spark, going 8–1 over the final two months of the season with a sparkling 1.79 ERA. After a loss on September 1, the Tigers reeled off a 12-game winning streak to put any thoughts of another late-season collapse to rest. The streak consisted of four consecutive three-game sweeps over their AL Central Division rivals. It was the Tigers' longest winning streak since the 1934 team won 14 straight. On September 16, the Tigers clinched the AL Central Division title with a 3–1 win over the Oakland Athletics. It was their first AL Central title since joining the division in 1998, and first division title of any kind since 1987.

Members of the 2011 Tigers won multiple statistical awards in 2011. Verlander won the pitching triple crown, leading the AL in wins (24), ERA (2.40) and strikeouts (250). On November 15, Verlander was a unanimous selection for the AL Cy Young Award. In a much closer vote six days later, Verlander also won AL MVP, becoming the first pitcher to do so since Dennis Eckersley in 1992. Valverde was the AL saves leader with 49 (in 49 save opportunities), winning the 2011 MLB Delivery Man of the Year Award. Cabrera won the AL batting title with a .344 average, while also leading the AL in on-base percentage (.448) and doubles (48).

The Tigers beat the New York Yankees by a score of 3–2 in Game 5 of the ALDS, winning the series 3–2. They advanced to the ALCS, but they lost to the defending AL Champion Texas Rangers, 4–2.

=== 2012: American League Champions ===
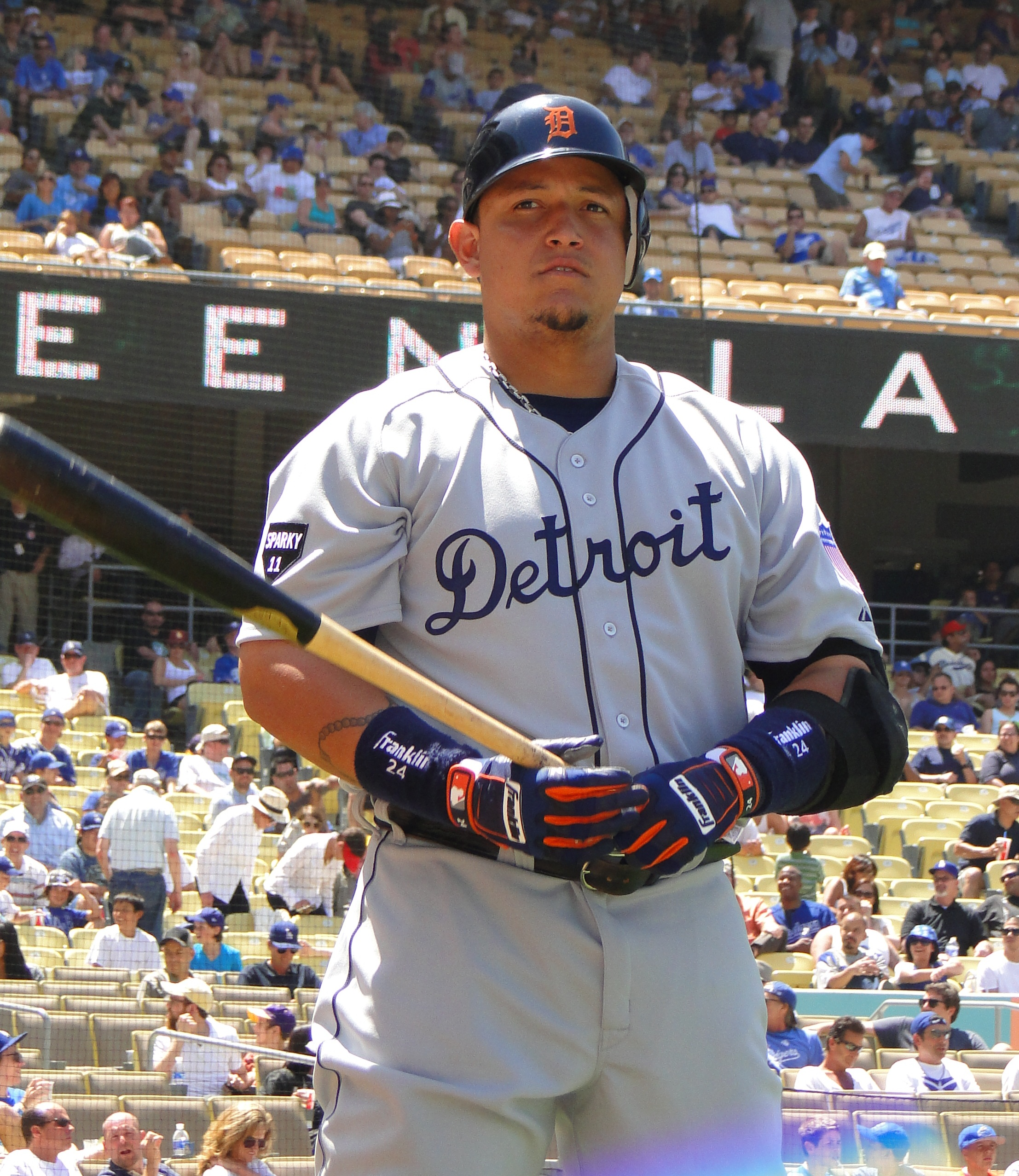
In 2012, Miguel Cabrera became the first Major League player to win the Triple Crown in 45 years.

In 2012, the Tigers looked to defend their 2011 AL Central Division title, with the hopes of earning a second consecutive playoff appearance. On January 24, the Tigers signed free agent All-Star first baseman Prince Fielder to a 9-year, $214 million contract. The move came shortly after the Tigers learned that Víctor Martínez had torn his anterior cruciate ligament during offseason training in Lakeland, Florida, and would likely miss the entire 2012 season. Miguel Cabrera moved back to his original position of third base, leading to the eventual release of veteran Brandon Inge on April 26. On July 23, the Tigers acquired veteran second baseman Omar Infante, who played for Detroit in 2003–07, and starting pitcher Aníbal Sánchez from the Miami Marlins in exchange for starting pitcher Jacob Turner and two other minor leaguers.

At the midway point of the 2012 season, the Tigers were three games under .500 (39–42). The team played much better in the second half and, after a fierce battle down the stretch with the Chicago White Sox, the Tigers clinched the AL Central division title on October 1 with a 6–3 win against the Kansas City Royals. Coupled with the Tigers' division title in 2011, it marked the first back-to-back divisional titles in team history, and first back-to-back postseason appearances since 1934–35. The Tigers concluded the season with an 88–74 record.

On the final day of the season, Cabrera earned the Triple Crown in batting, leading the AL in batting average (.330), home runs (44), and runs batted in (139). No player had accomplished this feat since Carl Yastrzemski in 1967. On the mound, starters Justin Verlander and Max Scherzer finished first and second among the American League strikeout leaders, with 239 and 231, respectively. Verlander (17–8, 2.64 ERA) finished second in the Cy Young Award balloting to David Price of the Tampa Bay Rays.

In the American League Division Series, the Tigers defeated the Oakland Athletics, 3–2, earning their second straight trip to the American League Championship Series. The Tigers completed a four-game sweep of the New York Yankees in the ALCS to win their 11th AL pennant and earn a trip to the World Series. In the World Series, the Tigers were swept by the San Francisco Giants.

On November 15, 2012, Cabrera was named AL MVP.

=== 2013: American League title defense ===
The Tigers entered the 2013 season looking to defend their 2012 AL pennant. Key acquisitions in the offseason included signing free agent outfielder Torii Hunter to a two-year, $26 million contract, while also signing their 2012 trade deadline acquisition, pitcher Aníbal Sánchez, to a five-year, $80 million deal. The Tigers also signed free agent catcher Brayan Peña to a one-year contract. Moreover, ace starter Justin Verlander signed a $180 million contract extension. The Tigers placed six players on the 2013 American League All-Star team: Miguel Cabrera, Prince Fielder, Jhonny Peralta, Torii Hunter, Max Scherzer and Justin Verlander.

On September 25, the Tigers clinched their third consecutive AL Central Division title. Tigers pitchers struck out 1,428 batters during the regular season, breaking the record of 1,404 held by the 2003 Chicago Cubs. Cabrera (.348 average, 44 HR, 139 RBI) was voted the AL MVP for the second straight season, while Scherzer (21–3, 2.90 ERA, 240 strikeouts) won the AL Cy Young Award.

The Tigers played the Oakland Athletics for the second straight year in the ALDS, and defeated the A's, 3–2. The Tigers set a record by striking out 57 Oakland batters in the ALDS. With his Game 5 gem, Verlander ran his postseason scoreless streak against Oakland to 30 innings.

The Tigers advanced to their third straight ALCS, where they played the Boston Red Sox for the first ever time in the postseason. The Tigers would be defeated in six games.

=== 2014: Changes at the top ===
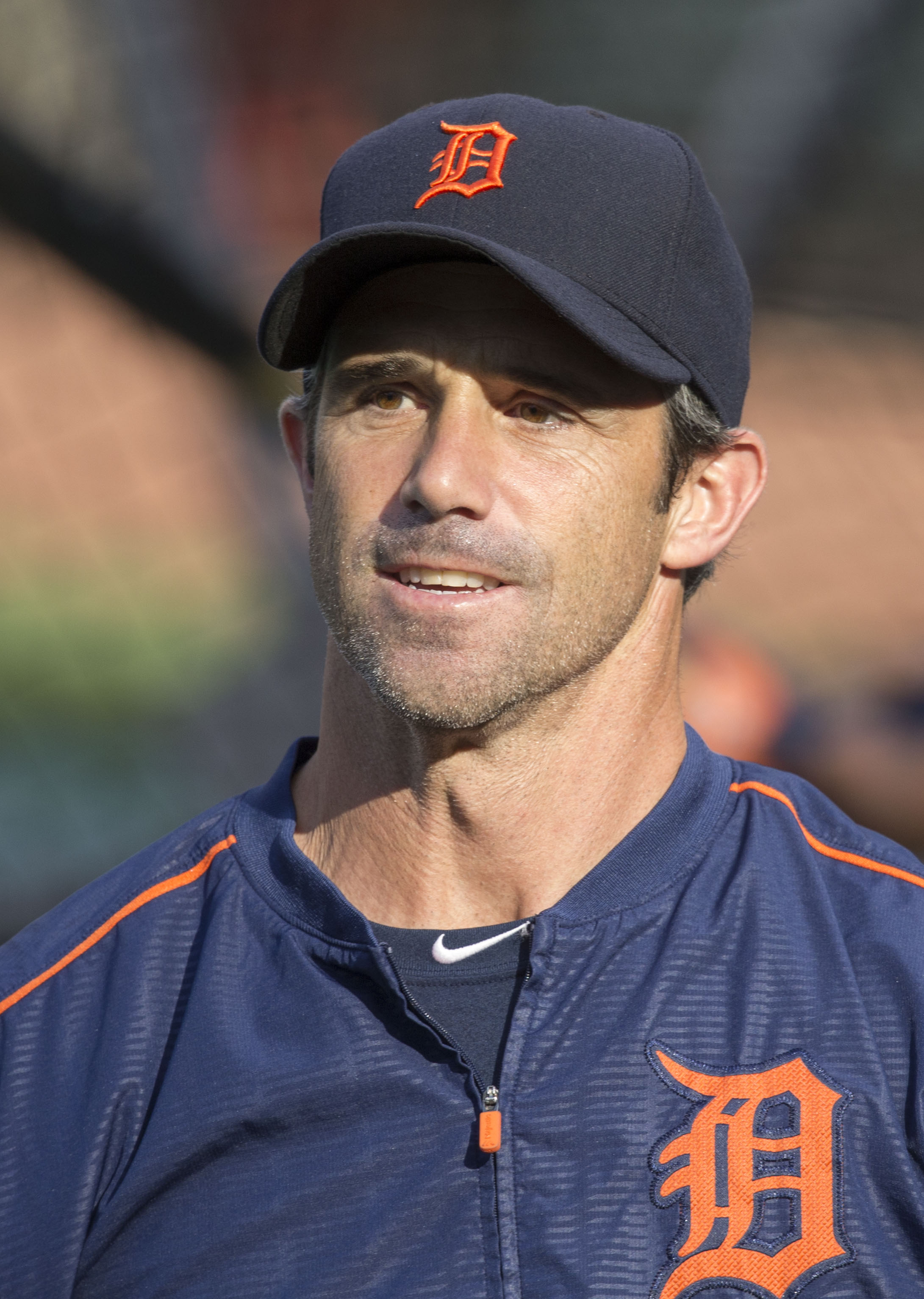
Brad Ausmus

Jim Leyland stepped down from his managerial position after eight years with Detroit, and the Tigers hired Brad Ausmus as Leyland's successor. On November 20, 2013, the Tigers traded Prince Fielder to the Texas Rangers for three time All-Star second baseman Ian Kinsler plus cash considerations with regard to Fielder's remaining contract amount. The Tigers later traded starting pitcher Doug Fister to the Washington Nationals for infielder Steve Lombardozzi Jr. and pitchers Ian Krol and Robbie Ray.

In an effort to improve a bullpen that often struggled in 2013, the Tigers signed veteran closer Joe Nathan to a two-year, $20 million contract, with a club option for 2016, and later signed Joba Chamberlain to a one-year, $2.5 million deal. On May 2, 2014, a month into the season, with the bullpen having a combined 5.37 ERA, which was 29th out of 30 in the MLB, the Tigers signed free agent reliever Joel Hanrahan to a one-year contract. However, he never came off the disabled list to pitch for the team. The team further bolstered the bullpen near the MLB trading deadline, dealing pitchers Corey Knebel and Jake Thompson to the Texas Rangers in exchange for former All-Star closer Joakim Soria on July 23.

On July 31, with just hours left before the end of the non-waiver trade deadline, the Tigers traded pitcher Drew Smyly and shortstop Willy Adames to the Tampa Bay Rays, and Austin Jackson to the Seattle Mariners in a three-team deal to acquire pitcher David Price from the Rays. With the acquisition of Price, the Tigers became the first team in major league history with three consecutive Cy Young Award winners in its starting rotation.

On September 28, the last day of the regular season, Price pitched a 3–0 gem against the Minnesota Twins, and the Tigers clinched their fourth consecutive AL Central Division title. The 90–72 Tigers finished one game ahead of the Kansas City Royals.

The Tigers faced the Baltimore Orioles in the 2014 American League Division Series, where they were swept, 3–0. J. D. Martinez became the first player in franchise history to hit home runs in his first two career postseason games. Both were part of back-to-back homers, with Víctor Martínez and Nick Castellanos in Games 1 and 2, respectively.

=== 2015: Mid-season reboot ===
Brad Ausmus continued to manage the Tigers for a second season. Free agents Max Scherzer and Torii Hunter left for other teams at the end of the year, while Rick Porcello, Eugenio Suárez, Robbie Ray, and prospect Devon Travis were all lost through trades. On the receiving end, the Tigers traded for slugger Yoenis Céspedes, relief pitcher Alex Wilson, speedy outfielder Anthony Gose and starting pitchers Alfredo Simón and Shane Greene.

After winning the first six games of the year in record-breaking fashion, the Tigers season slowly went downhill. Inconsistent pitching, division rivals outperforming expectations, and injuries to multiple players, including Joe Nathan, who only appeared in one game, Victor Martínez, and career first stints on the disabled list for Justin Verlander and Miguel Cabrera, sent the team below the .500 mark as the trade deadline came and the decision was made to "reboot" the team. Within a two-day span in late July, the Tigers traded David Price, Joakim Soria and Cespedes, receiving six well regarded prospects in return, including Daniel Norris and Michael Fulmer.

On August 4, longtime general manager Dave Dombrowski was released by the team, with assistant GM Al Avila being promoted to general manager and president of baseball operations.

Despite difficulties, the Tigers still ended up sending four players to the 2015 MLB All-Star Game: Miguel Cabrera received his 10th career All-Star selection and the starting nod, but could not play due to injury; David Price received his 5th career selection as well as the credit for the win for the American League; and J.D. Martinez and Jose Iglesias both received their first career All-Star selections.

The Tigers ended the season in last place in the AL Central Division with a record of 74–87. The pitching staff was one of the worst in the MLB, ending 27th in ERA, 28th in FIP, and 27th in WHIP. However, the team also ended with a team batting average of .270, the best in the MLB, while Miguel Cabrera finished with the highest player batting average in the AL and the MLB (.338), earning his fourth batting title in five years.

=== 2016 ===
Brad Ausmus and the Tigers entered the 2016 season with new pitching coach Rich Dubee and 9 out of 25 members of the 2015 roster being replaced through trades and free agency. Prominent additions included two highly sought free agents, starting pitcher Jordan Zimmermann and outfielder Justin Upton, as well as players acquired through trades: outfielder Cameron Maybin, and the veteran closer Francisco Rodriguez, who led a totally revamped bullpen. The Tigers lost two 2016 draft picks due to free agent compensation but, because of their bottom-ten finish in 2015, they kept their first round pick. Key veteran losses include catcher Alex Avila and outfielder Rajai Davis, who both signed free agent deals with other teams in the division.

The Tigers finished the season with a record of 86–75, eight games behind the first place Cleveland Indians. Detroit was the final team to fall out of contention for a wild card spot, losing Saturday and Sunday games to the Atlanta Braves, while the two teams they were chasing, Baltimore and Toronto, got needed wins.

Pitcher Michael Fulmer, acquired from the New York Mets organization in 2015, won the 2016 AL Rookie of the Year Award.

== Rebuilding (2017–2023) ==
=== 2017 ===
Mike Ilitch, the Tigers owner since 1992, died at the age of 87 on February 10, 2017. The team remains in an Ilitch family trust, under the leadership of Mike's son, Christopher Ilitch. Like the Detroit Red Wings, the Tigers honored their owner in multiple ways, the most prominent being a "Mr. I" uniform patch.

After a disappointing record through the All-Star break, the Tigers began committing to a rebuild, trading J. D. Martinez, Alex Avila and Justin Wilson in July, plus Justin Upton and Justin Verlander in August. On September 22, the Tigers announced that the team would not extend manager Brad Ausmus' contract past the 2017 season, ending his four-year tenure as manager. Under the management of Ausmus, the Tigers had a record of 314–332 (.486 winning percentage) and won one AL Central division title in 2014. The Tigers went 6–24 in September, ending the season in a tie for the worst record in MLB with the San Francisco Giants. However, due to a tiebreaker, the Tigers were awarded the number one overall pick in the 2018 MLB draft.

=== 2018 ===
On October 20, 2017, the Tigers announced that Ron Gardenhire and the team had reached a three-year agreement for the former Minnesota Twins skipper to succeed Brad Ausmus as the team's manager. While rebuilding with young players, the team also lost slugger Miguel Cabrera and expected ace pitcher Michael Fulmer to extensive stints on the disabled list. This led the team to the same 64–98 record as the previous year, the fifth worst record in MLB, but still good for third place in a very weak AL Central division.

=== 2019 ===
Significant changes to the 2019 season opening roster include the departure of José Iglesias, and the one-year signings of the middle infield tandem of Jordy Mercer and Josh Harrison, both formerly of the Pittsburgh Pirates. On March 19, it was announced that Michael Fulmer would undergo Tommy John surgery and miss the 2019 season. The Tigers finished the season with a 47–114 record, the worst in all of Major League Baseball, and their second worst season in franchise history after their 43–119 record in 2003. The 2019 Tigers tied the 1939 St. Louis Browns for the most home losses (59) during a season in the modern era.

=== 2020 ===
On April 6, Al Kaline died at the age of 85. Kaline had been affiliated with the team for 67 years, most recently as an executive. The Tigers wore a No. 6 patch to honor him. In the shortened 60-game season due to the COVID-19 pandemic, the Tigers remained in playoff contention heading into September. On September 19, manager Ron Gardenhire announced his retirement from baseball effective immediately, citing health concerns. Bench coach Lloyd McClendon was named interim manager for the remainder of the season. The Tigers ultimately faded down the stretch, finishing with a 23–35 record.

=== 2021 ===
On October 30, 2020, the Tigers hired A. J. Hinch as manager. On May 18, 2021, Spencer Turnbull pitched the eighth no-hitter in Tigers history against the Seattle Mariners. Turnbull became the first Tigers player to throw a no-hitter since Justin Verlander on May 7, 2011. The Tigers finished the season with a 77–85 record. This outperformed preseason predictions for the team, most of which said the Tigers would finish last.

=== 2022 ===
On August 10, 2022, the Tigers fired Al Avila as general manager. On September 19, 2022, the Tigers hired Scott Harris as president of baseball operations. The Tigers finished the season with a 66–96 record and had one of the worst offense in the league. On October 25, 2022, the Tigers hired Rob Metzler as vice president and assistant general manager.

=== 2023 ===
On September 21, 2023, the Tigers hired Jeff Greenberg as general manager. The Tigers finished the season with a 78–84 record, and in second place in the division. This was the final season for long-time Tigers slugger Miguel Cabrera, who announced he would retire from playing. Following his retirement, he joined the Tigers' front office as a special assistant to Scott Harris.

== Return to the playoffs (2024–2025) ==
=== 2024 ===
2024 was expected to be another quiet year for the Tigers. That appeared to be the case for much of the season as the team was 55–63 on August 10. The Tigers then went 31–11 to clinch a playoff berth for the first time since 2014 on September 27. They finished the season with a 86–76 record.

In the American League Wild Card Series, the Tigers swept the Houston Astros 2–0, securing their first postseason series win since 2013. In the American League Division Series, the Tigers were defeated by the Cleveland Guardians in five games.

=== 2025 ===
Despite a strong first half where they had the best overall record at 59–34 on July 8, the Tigers faltered severely in the second half, going 28–37 after the All-Star Game, including a 7–17 record in September. As a result, the Cleveland Guardians, who were 15.5 games behind them on July 8 and 10.5 games back on September 1, won the AL Central Division title at 88–74. Their collapse has been described as one of the worst in all of MLB history. Nevertheless, on September 27, the Tigers clinched a postseason berth for the second consecutive season with a 2–1 win over the Boston Red Sox. They finished with the same 87–75 record as the Houston Astros, but secured the last playoff spot via the head-to-head tiebreaker.

The Tigers defeated the Guardians in the American League Wild Card Series, 2–1. In the American League Division Series, the Tigers were defeated by the Seattle Mariners in five games.

== Step back (2026) ==
=== 2026 ===
After a subpar first half of the season, the Tigers had a mini-teardown and sent Tarik Skubal to the Los Angeles Dodgers in exchange for prospects Zahir Hope, River Ryan, and Brady Smith at the trade deadline. Casey Mize and Gage Workman were also sent to the San Diego Padres in exchange for prospects Kash Mayfield and Jackson Wolf. On September 19, the Tigers secured their first losing record since the 2023 season. The following day, they were eliminated from playoff contention for the first time since 2023.

On September 26, Justin Verlander, in his first season back with the team since being traded in 2017 and the final season of his career, pitched his last game. The Tigers finished the season at 76–86.
