= Spencer Brown =

Spencer Brown may refer to:

== Sportspeople ==
- Spencer Brown (offensive tackle) (born 1998), American football offensive tackle
- Spencer Brown (running back) (born 1998), American football running back
- Spencer Brown (fighter) (born 1997), Scottish fighter
- Spencer Brown (rugby union, born 1921) (1921–c. 1973), rugby union player who represented Australia
- Spencer Brown (rugby union, born 1973), English rugby union player

== Others ==
- Spencer Brown (comedian), English comedian, actor and writer
- Spencer Brown (musician) (born 1994), American musician
- Spencer Kellogg Brown (1842–1863), American Civil War spy
- Spencer Wharton Brown (1918–1977), American professor and cyto-geneticist

== See also ==
- G. Spencer-Brown (1923–2016), English polymath best known as the author of Laws of Form
