= Spen =

Spen may refer to:

- SPEN, human gene
- Spen, West Yorkshire, a location in England
- River Spen, river in West Yorkshire, England, the United Kingdom
- SS Spen, British steamship built in 1908
- SP Energy Networks, the energy networks arm of Scottish Power

== People ==
- Spen King (1925–2010), British automobile designer
- Spen Whittaker (1871–1910), English football manager

== See also ==
- S Pen, stylus pen for Samsung smartphones
