= Spencer Abbott =

Spencer Abbott may refer to:

- Spencer Abbott (baseball) (1877–1951), American baseball player and manager
- Spencer Abbott (ice hockey) (born 1988), Canadian ice hockey player
- Spencer Abbott, American musician; past member of the American Indie rock band Daphne Loves Derby
