= Spencer Kellogg Brown =

American spy (1842–1863)

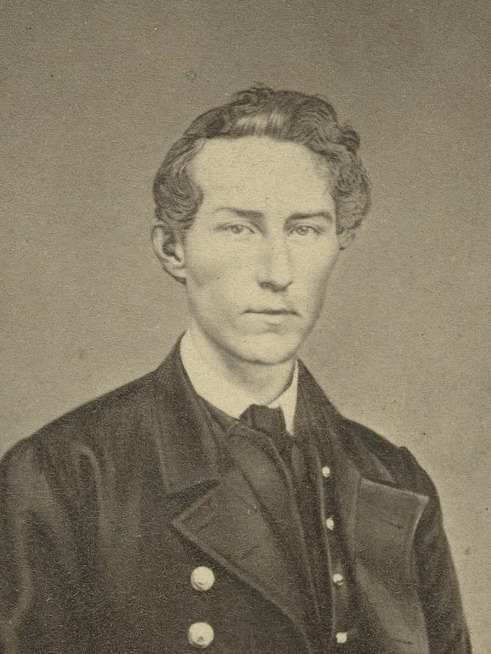
Spencer K. Brown

Spencer Kellogg Brown was born August 17, 1842, in Belleville, New York. He was the son of New York abolitionist Orville Chester Brown (1811–1904), who moved his family to Kansas and took part in the founding of Osawatomie.

In retaliation for what later came to be known as the Pottawatomie massacre, pro-slavery forces sacked Osawatomie on August 30, 1856. During the raid, Spencer's family house was burned to the ground by Border Ruffians, and he was captured and taken to Lafayette County, Missouri, where he was held prisoner for some time thought to be John Brown's son.

After the American Civil War began, Brown joined the Union Army, serving under Nathaniel Lyon in St. Louis. Later, he entered the naval military service of the United States, and served under William D. Porter on USS Essex. According to The New York Times, Brown volunteered to destroy a ferry-boat with Confederate supplies near Port Hudson, Louisiana. After successfully completing the mission, he was taken prisoner on his way back. Brown was imprisoned first in Jackson, Mississippi, then in Richmond, Virginia. He was tried as a spy and executed on September 25, 1863.
