= Spencer Perceval (disambiguation) =

Spencer Perceval (1762–1812) was Prime Minister of the United Kingdom.

Spencer Perceval may also refer to:

- Spencer Perceval (junior) (1795–1859), British Member of Parliament, the eldest son of the Prime Minister
- Spencer George Perceval (1838–1922), English amateur antiquary, geologist, and benefactor to Cambridge University
