= Spencer Turnbull =

American baseball player (born 1992)

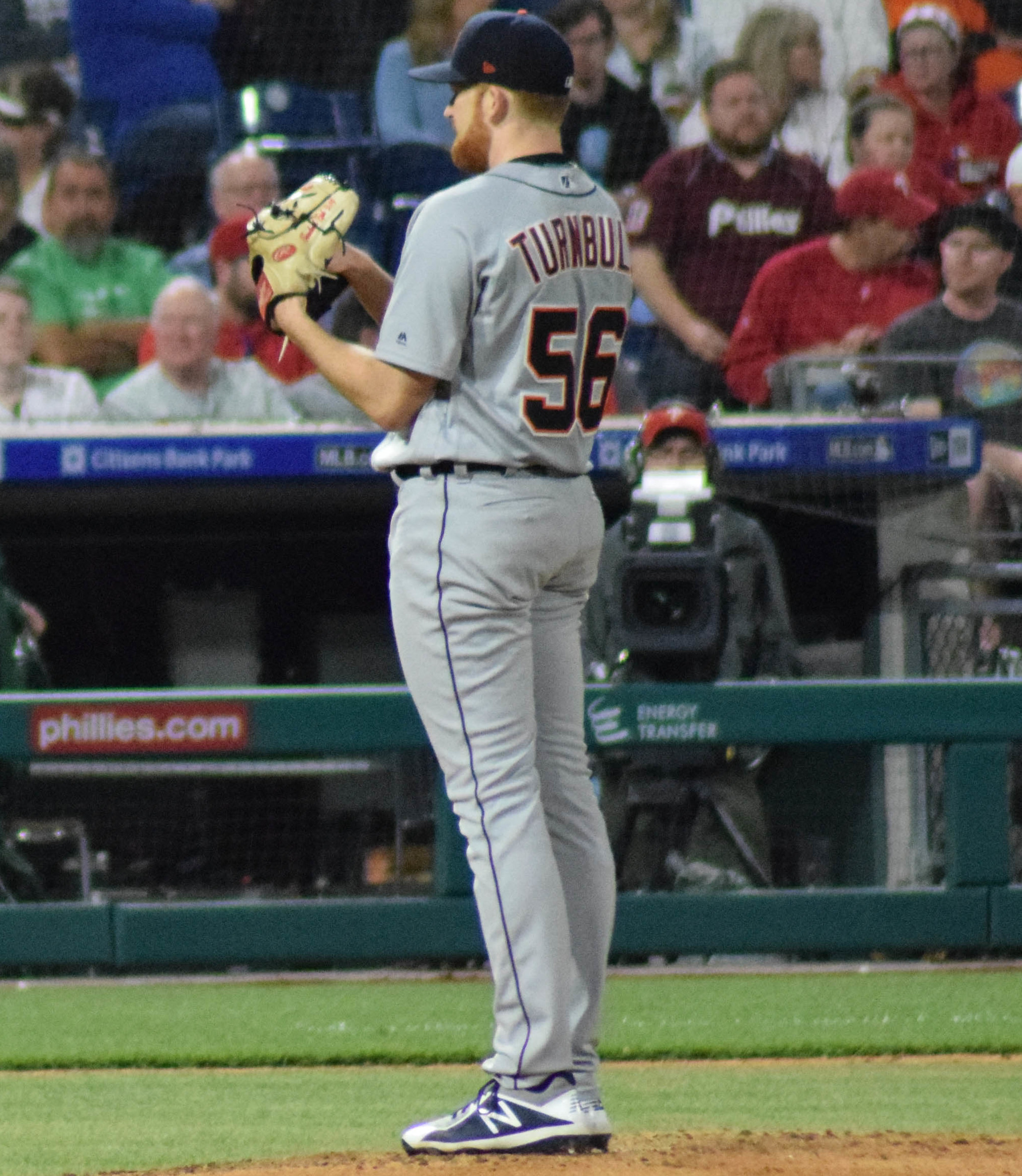
- Turnbull with the Detroit Tigers in 2019

Caliente de Durango – No. 31
- Pitcher
- Born: September 18, 1992 (age 33); Demopolis, Alabama, U.S.
- Bats: Right Throws: Right

MLB debut
- September 14, 2018, for the Detroit Tigers

MLB statistics (through 2025 season)
- Win–loss record: 16–30
- Earned run average: 4.31
- Strikeouts: 342
- Stats at Baseball Reference

Teams
- Detroit Tigers (2018–2021, 2023); Philadelphia Phillies (2024); Toronto Blue Jays (2025)

Career highlights and awards
- Pitched a no-hitter on May 18, 2021

Spencer Ketcham Turnbull (born September 18, 1992) is an American professional baseball pitcher for the Caliente de Durango of the Mexican League. He has previously played in Major League Baseball (MLB) for the Detroit Tigers, Philadelphia Phillies, and Toronto Blue Jays.

Turnbull played college baseball for the Alabama Crimson Tide before the Tigers selected him in the second round of the 2014 MLB draft. Turnbull made his MLB debut in 2018 with the Tigers. On May 18, 2021, he threw a no-hitter against the Seattle Mariners.

== Career ==
=== Amateur career ===
Turnbull attended Madison Central High School in Madison, Mississippi, and the University of Alabama, where he played college baseball for the Alabama Crimson Tide. He became Alabama's top starting pitcher in 2013. After the 2013 season, he played collegiate summer baseball with the Wareham Gatemen of the Cape Cod Baseball League.

=== Minor leagues ===
The Detroit Tigers selected Turnbull in the second round, with the 63rd overall selection, of the 2014 MLB draft. He signed with the Tigers, receiving a $900,600 signing bonus. He began his professional career with the GCL Tigers, and after one start, was promoted to the Low–A Connecticut Tigers, where he finished the season, posting an 0–2 record and 4.45 ERA in 11 starts. He spent 2015 with the Single–A West Michigan Whitecaps where he was 11–3 with a 3.01 ERA and 1.35 WHIP in 22 starts. He missed most of the 2016 season due to a shoulder impingement. Turnbull began 2017 with the High–A Lakeland Flying Tigers, compiling a 7–3 record and 3.05 ERA in 15 starts, and finished the season with the Double–A Erie SeaWolves where he pitched to an 0–3 record and 6.20 ERA in four starts.

=== Detroit Tigers (2018–2023) ===
The Tigers added him to their 40-man roster after the 2017 season. He returned to Erie in 2018. He started 13 games for the SeaWolves and then two games for the Toledo Mud Hens of the Triple–A International League, before the Tigers promoted him to the major leagues on September 11. He made his major league debut on September 14, pitching a 1-2-3 inning of relief with one strikeout against the Cleveland Indians. He finished 0–2 in 4 appearances for Detroit.

In 2019, Turnbull made the starting rotation out of spring training and earned his first MLB win on April 23. Turnbull went 3–17 in 30 starts on the season, with a 4.61 ERA and 146 strikeouts in 148 1/3 innings. His 17 losses led the major leagues. He also had the lowest run support of all qualifying major league starters, at just 2.65 runs per game.

On July 31, 2020, Turnbull earned the win in a 7–2 victory over the Cincinnati Reds. It was his first win in his last 19 starts, and his first-ever win at home following 18 previous starts at Comerica Park. Turnbull started 11 of the Tigers' 58 games during the 2020 season, compiling a 4–4 record with a 3.97 ERA and 51 strikeouts in 58 2/3 innings.

Turnbull did not make the Tigers' Opening Day roster for the 2021 season, due to being placed on the non-baseball related (COVID-19) injured list. He returned to the rotation on April 21, and won his season debut against the Pittsburgh Pirates.

On May 18, 2021, Turnbull pitched the eighth no-hitter in Tigers history against the Seattle Mariners, recording nine strikeouts and two walks in a 5–0 win. It was the first no-hitter by a Tiger since Justin Verlander's in 2011.

On June 5, 2021, Turnbull was placed on the injured list with a right forearm strain, and was transferred to the 60-day injured list on July 7 after suffering a setback in his recovery. On July 20, it was announced that Turnbull would undergo Tommy John surgery, ending his season. In nine games with Detroit in 2021, he posted a 4–2 record and 2.88 ERA. Turnbull missed the entire 2022 season rehabilitating from surgery.

Turnbull returned to major leagues on April 2, 2023, allowing seven runs on eight hits and three walks in 2 1/3 innings against the Tampa Bay Rays. After seven starts, in which he struggled to a 1–4 record and 7.26 ERA, Turnbull was optioned to Triple–A Toledo on May 7. He was placed on the injured list with neck discomfort on May 12, and transferred to the 60-day injured list on June 9. On August 23, Turnbull was activated from the injured list and optioned to Triple–A Toledo. On November 17, 2023, the Tigers did not tender a contract to Turnbull making him a free agent.

=== Philadelphia Phillies (2024) ===
On February 14, 2024, Turnbull signed a one-year, $2 million contract with the Philadelphia Phillies. He made his first appearance and start with the Phillies on April 2, where he threw five innings and allowed three hits, no earned runs, no walks, and seven strikeouts. In 17 games, Turnbull logged a 2.65 ERA with 58 strikeouts. He was placed on the injured list with a lat strain on June 27, and was transferred to the 60–day injured list on August 17.

=== Toronto Blue Jays (2025) ===
On May 5, 2025, Turnbull signed a major league contract with the Toronto Blue Jays and was optioned to the Florida Complex League Blue Jays. In three appearances (one start) for Toronto, he registered a 1-1 record and 7.11 ERA with four strikeouts across 6 1/3 innings pitched. Turnbull was designated for assignment by the Blue Jays on June 25. He was released by Toronto on June 27.

=== Chicago Cubs (2025) ===
On July 12, 2025, Turnbull signed a minor league contract with the Chicago Cubs. In six starts for the Triple-A Iowa Cubs, he struggled to an 0-3 record and 9.49 ERA with 24 strikeouts across 24 1/3 innings; he also made one start for the rookie-level Arizona Complex League Cubs. Turnbull triggered the opt-out clause in his contract was released by the Cubs organization on August 28.

=== Kansas City Royals (2025) ===
On August 30, 2025, Turnbull signed a minor league contract with the Kansas City Royals. He made four appearances (three starts) for the Triple-A Omaha Storm Chasers, but struggled to an 0-2 record and 6.38 ERA with 17 strikeouts across 18 1/3 innings pitched. Turnbull elected free agency following the season on November 6.

=== Caliente de Durango ===
On June 4, 2026, Turnbull signed with the Caliente de Durango of the Mexican League.

== Pitch selection ==
Turnbull throws a four-seam fastball and a tailing two-seam fastball, each averaging 94–95 MPH (topping out at 98 MPH), a slider averaging 86–87 MPH, a curveball at about 80–81 MPH, and a changeup at about 86–88 MPH. The slider has been his most effective pitch, yielding only a .202 batting-average-against over his career.

== Personal life ==
Turnbull is the son of Jim and Missy Turnbull. Turnbull is a Christian.

Turnbull revealed that he was dating Ashley TerKeurst, a fashion blogger and the daughter of Lysa TerKeurst, after throwing his no-hitter in 2021. They are married and have a child together.

== See also ==
- List of Major League Baseball no-hitters
- List of baseball players who underwent Tommy John surgery

Awards and achievements
Preceded by Wade Miley	No-hitter pitcher May 18, 2021	Succeeded by Corey Kluber
