= Spencer Kobren =

American radio personality

Spencer Kobren (born May 1965) is the founder of The American Hair Loss Association and The International Alliance of Hair Restoration Surgeons. He is the author of The Bald Truth: The First Complete Guide to Preventing and Treating Hair Loss and The Truth About Woman's Hair Loss.

Kobren hosted a nationally syndicated radio program also called The Bald Truth which aired on XM satellite radio as well as on radio stations throughout the United States. Following the death of his brother, Alan, he created a radio series entitled Highway Justice about road safety. He currently hosts "The Bald Truth" podcast on Friday's which can be seen on YouTube. He is also a contributing editor to Consumers Digest Magazine and hair loss content provider for WebMD.
