= Lysa TerKeurst =

American author (born 1969)

- Born: July 21, 1969 (age 57)
- Occupations: Author, speaker
- Writing career
- Language: English
- Years active: 1995–
- Subject: Christian non-fiction
- Website: lysaterkeurst.com

Lysa TerKeurst (born July 21, 1969) is an American speaker and author of Christian non-fiction. She has written more than a dozen books, including the number 1 New York Times bestsellers Uninvited: Living Loved When You Feel Less Than, Left Out, and Lonely and Forgiving What You Can't Forget. She is president of Proverbs 31 Ministries.

== Career ==
TerKeurst is president of Proverbs 31 Ministries, which started as a small newsletter published in 1994 by Jennifer McHugh but expanded in 1995 when TerKeurst and Marybeth Whalen got involved. After growing the organization, TerKeurst led the way for the newsletter to be transformed into Proverbs 31 Ministries reaching millions of women daily with Biblical truth and wisdom.

TerKeurst published her first book, Living Life on Purpose: Discovering God's Best for Your Life, in 2000.

Several of her books have been New York Times bestsellers, including It's Not Supposed to Be This Way, Unglued: Making Wise Choices in the Midst of Raw Emotions, Uninvited: Living Loved When You Feel Less Than, Left Out, and Lonely, Forgiving What You Can't Forget, and The Best Yes: Making Wise Decisions in the Midst of Endless Demands. It's Not Supposed to Be This Way was on the New York Times bestseller list for 13 weeks. Uninvited was on the New York Times bestseller list for 31 weeks. The Best Yes: Making Wise Decisions in the Midst of Endless Demands was on the New York Times bestseller list for six weeks.

=== Critical reception ===
Her books Uninvited: Living Loved When You Feel Less Than, Left Out, and Lonely, Forgiving What You Can’t Forget: Discover How to Move On, Make Peace with Painful Memories, and Create a Life That’s Beautiful Again, and It's Not Supposed to Be This Way received starred reviews from Publishers Weekly.

A review for her 2014 book The Best Yes: Making Wise Decisions in the Midst of Endless Demands reads, "TerKeurst's often self-deprecating humor and ability to be vulnerable, combined with insightful Bible references, make this a book women can relate to in a hundred little ways each day".

In 2015, TerKeurst published a book for children, Win or Lose, I Love You!, which was illustrated by Jana Christy. This book was met with mixed reception from Publishers Weekly, which wrote, "As a teaching tool, it's sure to have its uses, though the story itself never rises beyond its instructive goals". Kirkus Reviews similarly received the book as, "Didactic? To be sure, but it’s a much-needed lesson that goes down easily".

Publishers Weekly praised the conversational tone of TerKeurst's 2016 book Uninvited: Living Loved When You Feel Less Than, Left Out, and Lonely. The audiobook adaptation was read by Ginny Welsh.

About her 2018 book It's Not Supposed to Be This Way, Publishers Weekly noted "[h]er transparency, wit, and spiritual insight make this skillfully crafted volume feel like time spent in honest conversation with a trusted friend".

Publishers Weekly gave the 2020 book Forgiving What You Can't Forget: Discover How to Move On, Make Peace with Painful Memories, and Create a Life That’s Beautiful Again a positive review, noting, "TerKeurst’s fans will love this stirring, realistic look at confronting the arduous aspects of forgiveness".

== Personal life ==
TerKeurst is a native of Tallahassee, Florida. Her parents divorced when she was in middle school. She was raised a Christian, but gave up on her faith when her 16-month-old half-sister, Haley, died on September 27, 1988 in Pittsburgh, PA. She graduated from Furman University in South Carolina.

In 2008, TerKeurst published an essay about an abortion she had before her marriage. She has five children.

Terkeurst reconciled with her husband Art TerKeurst, who she said was repeatedly unfaithful and abused substances. In December 2018, TerKeurst and her husband renewed their vows near their home in Waxhaw, North Carolina.

In January 2022, Lysa TerKeurst announced on social media that she had decided to end her marriage, saying that he her husband had broken those vows again. In January 2024 she announced on social media that she had married Chaz Adams.

== Selected works ==
- TerKeurst, Lysa (2005). What happens when women walk in faith. Eugene, Or.: Harvest House Publishers. ISBN 0-7369-1571-0. OCLC 57531395.
- TerKeurst, Lysa (2009). Becoming more than a good Bible study girl. Grand Rapids, Mich.: Zondervan. ISBN 978-0-310-29325-5. OCLC 315239178.
- TerKeurst, Lysa (2010). Made to crave : satisfying your deepest desire with God, not food. Grand Rapids, Mich.: Thomas Nelson. ISBN 978-0-310-29326-2. OCLC 646630480.
- Unglued: Making Wise Choices in the Midst of Raw Emotions. Thomas Nelson, 2012. ISBN 0718093046
- TerKeurst, Lysa (2014). The best yes : making wise decisions in the midst of endless demands. Nashville, Tennessee: Thomas Nelson. ISBN 978-1-4002-0585-1. OCLC 864092482.
- TerKeurst, Lysa (2016). Uninvited : living loved when you feel less than, left out, and lonely; study guide /six sessions. Nashville: Thomas Nelson Pub. ISBN 978-1-4002-0600-1. OCLC 938395415.
- TerKeurst, Lysa (2016). Finding I am : how Jesus fully satisfies the cry of your heart. Nashville, Tennessee: Lifeway Church Resources. ISBN 978-1-4300-5352-1. OCLC 967500573.
- TerKeurst, Lysa (2017). What happens when women say yes to God. Lysa TerKeurst. Eugene, Or.: Harvest House Publishers. ISBN 978-0-7369-1922-7. OCLC 71552239.
- TerKeurst, Lysa (2018). Embraced : 100 devotions to know God is holding you close. Nashville, Tennessee: Thomas Nelson. ISBN 978-1-4003-1029-6. OCLC 993421506.
- TerKeurst, Lysa (2018). It's not supposed to be this way : finding unexpected strength when disappointments leave you shattered. Nashville. ISBN 978-0-7180-3985-1. OCLC 1035467950.
- TerKeurst, Lysa (2019). Trustworthy : a study of 1 & 2 Kings : overcoming our greatest struggles to trust God. Nashville, TN: Life Way Press. ISBN 978-1-5359-0671-5. OCLC 1140102373.
- TerKeurst, Lysa (2020). Forgiving what you can't forget : discover how to move on, make peace with painful memories, and create a life that's beautiful again. Nelson Books. Nashville, Tennessee. ISBN 978-0-7180-3987-5. OCLC 1151493262.
- TerKeurst, Lysa (2022). Good Boundaries and Goodbyes: Loving Others Without Losing the Best of Who You Are. Nelson Books. Nashville, Tennessee. ISBN 978-1-400211760.
- TerKeurst, Lysa (2023) You're Going to Make It: 50 Morning and Evening Devotions to Unrush Your Mind, Uncomplicate Your Heart, and Experience Healing Today

=== For children ===
- Win or Lose, I Love You. Tommy Nelson, 2015.

=== As contributor ===
- Encouragement for Today: Devotions for Everyday Living. Zondervan, 2013. With Renee Swope and Samantha Evilsizer. ISBN 0310336287
