= Spencer Johnson =

Spencer Johnson may refer to:

- Spencer Johnson (American football) (born 1981), American football defensive tackle
- Spencer Johnson (cricketer) (born 1995), Australian cricketer
- Spencer Johnson (soccer) (born 1991), American soccer midfielder
- Spencer Johnson (writer) (1938–2017), American author, speaker, and management consultant
