= Spencer Compton =

Spencer Compton may refer to:

- Spencer Compton, 2nd Earl of Northampton (1601–1643), British politician
- Spencer Compton, 1st Earl of Wilmington (1673–1743), British statesman and Prime Minister
- Spencer Compton, 8th Earl of Northampton (1738–1796), British politician
- Spencer Compton, 2nd Marquess of Northampton (1790–1851), British nobleman
- Spencer Compton, 7th Marquess of Northampton (born 1946), British nobleman
