= Spencer Clark =

Spencer Clark may refer to:

- Spencer M. Clark. first superintendent of the National Currency Bureau, today known as the Bureau of Engraving and Printing
- Spencer Clark (racing driver), racecar driver
- Spencer Treat Clark, actor
- Spencer Clark (musician), jazz saxophonist
- Spencer Clark, musician and member of the Skaters
- (Herbert) Spencer Clark, Canadian, along with Rosa Clark, responsible for Guild of all Arts artist colony and heritage building conservatory.
