= Spencer Gore =

Spencer Gore may refer to:

- Spencer Gore (sportsman), cricketer for Surrey, and winner of the first Wimbledon tennis championship
- Spencer Gore (artist), British painter and first President of the Camden Town Group
