= William Boulton =

William Boulton may refer to:

- William Henry Boulton (1812–1874), lawyer and political figure in Canada West
- William Boulton (engineer) (1825–1900), English engineer from Burslem, Staffordshire
- William Henry Boulton (author) (1869–1964), English writer on assyriology
- Sir William Boulton, 1st Baronet (1873–1949), British soldier and Conservative Party politician
- Sir William Boulton, 3rd Baronet (1912–2010), British soldier and barrister
- William Savage Boulton (1867–1954), English geologist, mining engineer, and water engineer

== See also ==
- Boulton (disambiguation)
