= RMS Empress of Australia (1919) =

Passenger vessel built in 1913–1919

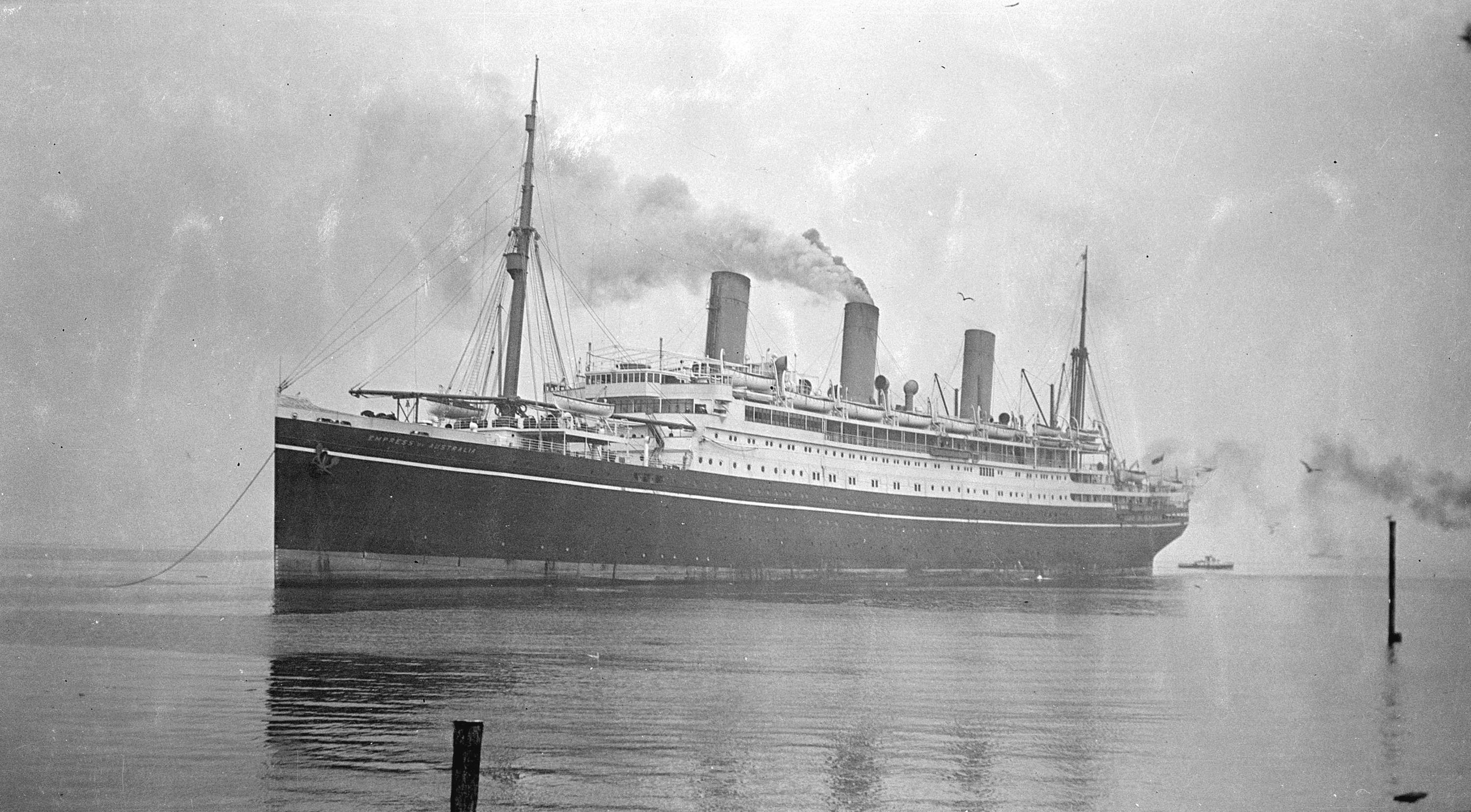
- Empress of Australia moored, possibly during the 1920s.

History
- Name: 1913: Admiral von Tirpitz; 1914–1921: Tirpitz; 1921: Empress of China; 1922–1952: Empress of Australia
- Owner: 1913–1919: Hamburg America Line; 1920–1921: P&O (managers); 1921–1952: Canadian Pacific
- Port of registry: 1913–1919: (German Empire) Hamburg; 1920–1952: (United Kingdom) London
- Builder: AG Vulcan Stettin, Germany (now Szczecin), Poland)
- Yard number: 333
- Launched: 20 December 1913
- Maiden voyage: 1 December 1919
- In service: 1 December 1919
- Out of service: 1952
- Fate: Scrapped at Thos. W. Ward Inverkeithing 1952

General characteristics
- Type: Ocean liner
- Tonnage: 21,833 GRT, 12,177 NRT
- Length: 589.9 ft (179.8 m)
- Beam: 75.2 ft (22.9 m)
- Draught: 29 ft 3 in (8.92 m)
- Depth: 41.5 ft (12.6 m)
- Decks: 2
- Installed power: 3,603 NHP
- Propulsion: DE and 6 SE boilers; Six steam turbines driving two propellers by single-reduction gearing
- Speed: 19 knots (35 km/h; 22 mph)
- Capacity: 400 1st-class, 150 Tourist-class, 635 3rd-class
- Crew: 520 officers & crew

RMS Empress of Australia was an ocean liner built in 1913–1919 by AG Vulcan Stettin in Szczecin, Germany for the Hamburg America Line. She was refitted for Canadian Pacific Steamships; and the ship – the third of three CP vessels to be named Empress of China – was renamed in 1922, for a final time, as Empress of Australia.

In trans-Pacific service, the ship garnered fame for her part in rescue efforts at Tokyo following the Great Kantō Earthquake of 1923.

In trans-Atlantic service, she earned distinction in 1927 by bringing the Prince of Wales from England to the Diamond Jubilee celebrations in Canada. She was honoured to serve as Royal Yacht during the Royal tour of Canada in 1939.

== Service history ==
The ship was originally built for the Hamburg America Line by AG Vulcan Stettin, Stettin, Germany, in 1912, as yard number 333.

=== Hamburg America Line ownership ===
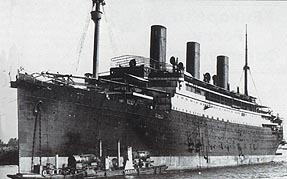
Admiral von Tirpitz during fitting out at the Vulkan shipyards in Stettin.

The partly completed hull was launched on 20 December 1913. During this period, it was the intention of the Hamburg America Line to name the completed ship the SS Admiral von Tirpitz in honour of Alfred von Tirpitz.

This choice of name was odd, as Admiral von Tirpitz, who had done much to improve Germany’s navy, had anti-British sentiments and views. Albert Ballin did not share them, and he feared that a war between the two nations might be at hand. This may be why the ship’s name was shortened to just Tirpitz in February 1914. Her final outfitting was held up due to the outbreak of World War I.

Her first trip was under seizure as a war prize when she sailed from Hamburg to Hull on 1 December 1919. She was then used as a troop ship under P&O management.

=== Canadian Pacific ownership ===
Tirpitz was one of two German-built vessels purchased by Canadian Pacific Railway in 1921 which were both at somepoint renamed RMS Empress of China; the first vessel SS Prinz Friedrich Wilhelm having briefly carried the name Empress of China before being renamed RMS Empress of India in advance of CPR's acquisition of the Tirpitz.

Thus Tirpitz became the third CPR vessel to carry the name Empress of China, however this would only last a matter of months. She was refitted by John Brown & Company, Clydebank, and renamed by CPR yet again to become RMS Empress of Australia in August 1921. By 1922 she sailed from Greenock to the Pacific via the Panama Canal.

After 20 voyages across the Pacific, Canadian Pacific were forced to deal with the poor performance and chose to re-engine and re-boiler the ship. She sailed to Govan Fairfield at Glasgow, arriving 9 September 1926. The vastly complex work was made more difficult by her divided uptakes, offering no central space to remove machinery. Old boilers were sliced up and removed in pieces, the whole job lasting many months and cost over half a million pounds.

When completed she was now powered by CA Parsons & Company steam turbines and six double-ended boilers. On trials the ship made 20.34 knots (37.67 km/h; 23.41 mph) and required 50 tons a day less oil. Three classes of passenger accommodations were incorporated in the final layout; in total, 1,500 passengers could be carried in luxurious interior appointments, the ship having been fitted out to a very high specification. The dining room was in the French Regency style. There was a spacious Lounge designed in the Empire style, which included a dance floor. The writing room was fitted in the Louis XVI style, with tinted walls and mahogany furniture, as was the smoking room which had oak panelled walls. There was also a swimming pool and fully equipped gymnasium.

=== From near disaster to great distinction ===
On Saturday, 1 September 1923, at 11:55 am, Empress of Australia was making ready to depart from the docks at Yokohama, Japan. Several hundred people were on the docks, catching streamers and confetti from the passengers lining the rails, and waving their farewells. Tugs were about to ease the ship away from the dock when, without warning the 23,000 ton liner was flung violently from side to side. The earth trembled under several violent shocks and sections of the dock collapsed under the feet of the panic stricken crowds. The land and remaining dock structure began to roll in wave like motions as high as six to eight feet. In minutes the worst shocks were over, but after-shocks, some quite heavy, continued for some time, while winds rose to 70 mph (110 km/h). From the city a heavy rumbling sound could be heard as hundreds of buildings collapsed into rubble. This was the 1923 Great Kantō earthquake, devastating Tokyo and Yokohama and the entire Kantō region of central Honshū. This was one of the worst earthquake disasters in recorded history.

Empress of Australia was in a very dangerous position. Crowded with passengers, she was still alongside the remains of the dock, with a freighter moored close behind so she could not clear without the aid of tugs. Meantime, Lyons Maru, moored to the east, had lost her cable and drifted across the harbour, colliding with the Empress at her stern. She then collided with a lighter loaded with lumber that had drifted alongside. This small vessel acted as a buffer between the two large ships and prevented further damage. Tugs had disappeared in the confusion and fires had started on the docks and were spreading rapidly. Available crew and passengers were put to work hosing down the ship to put out sparks and embers that were falling on the decks. Ropes and ladders were lowered over the side so that people trapped on the dock could climb aboard. Captain Robinson attempted to push the freighter moored astern with his ship, to allow enough room to maneuver away from the flaming docks. The Empress was able to carefully move the nearby freighter, Steel Navigator; and then the Empress slowly maneuvered clear.

When Empress of Australia moved forward, her port propeller fouled in the anchor cable of the freighter. The liner was now about 60 feet (18 m) away from the flames, and the winds had shifted, blowing the fires away from the ship. By 3 pm the fires had died down and the wind dropped off to a light breeze; the ship was immobile but safe for the moment. In the distance vast fires could be seen in the city. The ship's lifeboats were lowered and manned by members of the crew and passenger volunteers, who formed rescue parties to help those ashore, working through the night.

Empress of Australia in her prime

The next morning, the ship was again in danger from a large mass of burning oil that was moving across the harbour. The Empress could not maneuver because of the damaged propeller, but was able to avoid the oil fire long enough to with assistance from the tanker Iris. Her captain agreed to tow the bow of Empress of Australia around, she was then able to move out to sea to a safer anchorage. When taking a count on Sunday, there were over 2000 refugees on board.

On Monday RMS Empress of Canada arrived on her regular schedule; and she was able to provide Empress of Australia with more stores. Then Empress of Canada transported a large number of refugees on to Kobe, where the Japanese government had set up a relief centre.

On 4 September, the Imperial Japanese Navy's second Fusō-class battleship Yamashiro arrived at the harbour. Empress of Australia had been unable to proceed due to the fact that she had a fouled propeller. Arrangements were made for a diver from Yamashiro to inspect the damage and effect repairs. The cable was unwound and the machinery was tested; and the fouled propeller was found to have suffered no damage. Diving parties from HMS Despatch also worked on the ship from the 6th to the 8th of September.

Empress of Australia was now free to leave, but at the request of the British Consul, had remained as long as needed for continued relief work. Each morning, for the next several days, Empress of Australia re-entered the devastated harbour and sent her boats ashore manned by a combination of crew, local residents, and passenger volunteers. Refugees were brought aboard, transferred from the ship to other vessels, or taken to Kobe. To aid the victims, the ship's officers and most of the passengers donated everything they could spare. She finally departed Yokohama on 12 September 1923, returning to her routine duties; her services were not forgotten. Captain Samuel Robinson received numerous awards in recognition of his actions, including the CBE, and award of the Lloyds Silver Medal.

A group of passengers and refugees who were aboard during the disaster commissioned a bronze tablet and presented it to the ship in recognition of the relief efforts. When Empress of Australia was scrapped in 1952, the bronze tablet was rescued and presented to Captain Robinson, then aged 82, in a special ceremony in Vancouver.

=== Atlantic crossing and royal patronage ===
On 12 September 1923, Empress of Australia returned to her routine duties. In August, three years later, Empress of Australia departed from Hong Kong, after her twenty first and final Pacific voyage.

Canadian Pacific decided to transfer Empress of Australia to the companies Atlantic service. She sailed from Southampton for Quebec City on her first voyage on 25 June 1927, with the Prince of Wales and Prince George, Duke of Kent. The Royal princes and Prime Minister Stanley Baldwin were bound for Diamond Jubilee celebrations in Canada. In this new Atlantic route, she was teamed with two other ships — Empress of Scotland (originally the SS Kaiserin Auguste Victoria) and Empress of France.

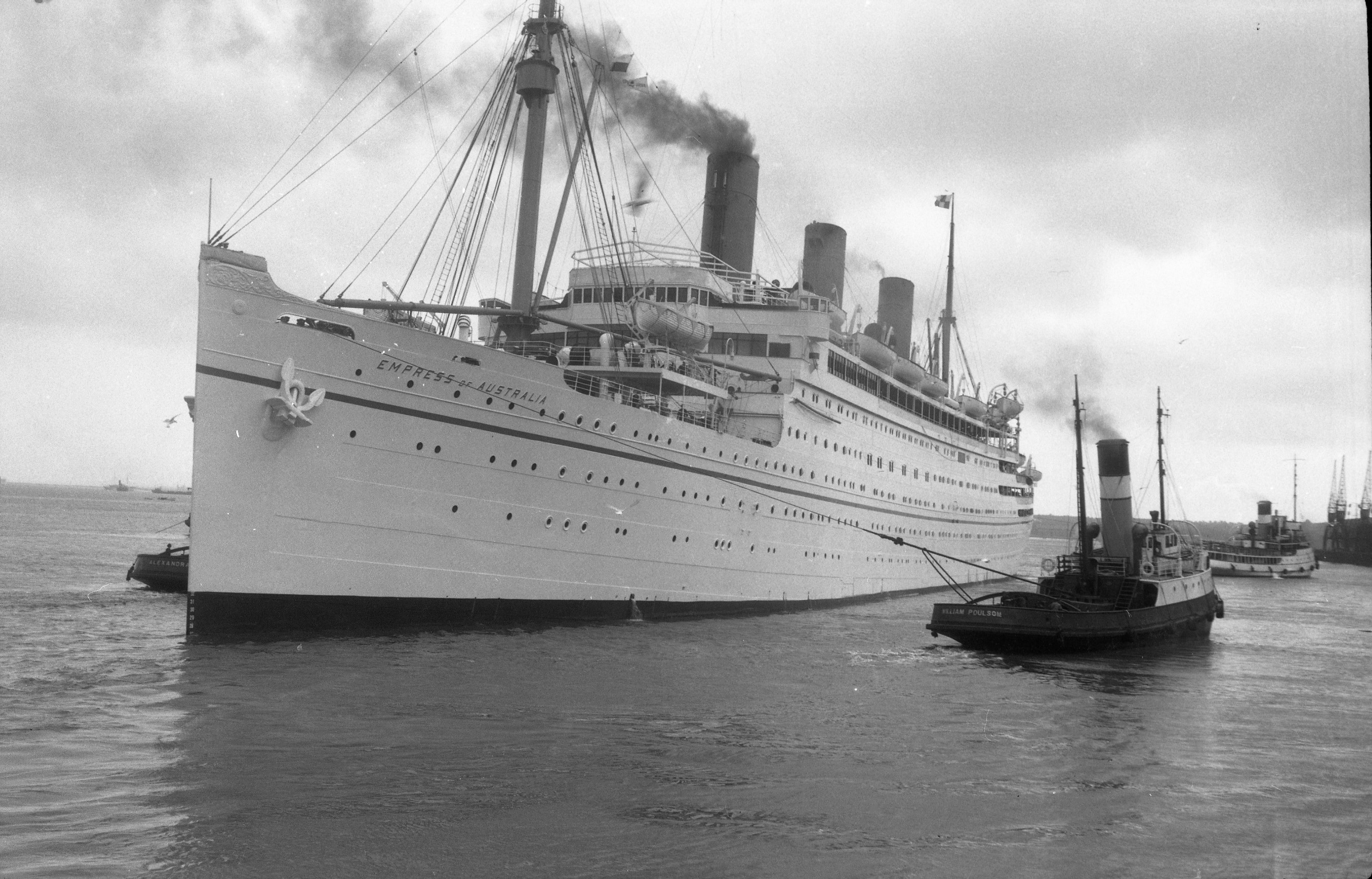
Empress of Australia as a Cruise ship.

In 1928 Empress of Australia began to cruise in the off season and to sail on round the world voyages.

After Empress of France was withdrawn from the service, Empress of Australia and Empress of Scotland carried on a two-ship service with white hulls with dark blue ribbon and green boot topping.

In 1938, the liner travelled to Harland & Wolff at Southampton for an overhaul, returning for the 1939 season.

On 8 March 1939, Empress of Australia collided with the French cargo liner Éridan at Algiers, Algeria. After three Atlantic crossings the ship was selected to act as the royal yacht for King George VI and the Queen Elizabeth for their Royal tour of Canada. In 1939, HMY Empress of Australia, sailed from Portsmouth 6 May 1939 and arrived at Quebec on 17 May 1939, two days late due to dense fog on the Atlantic. The king and queen used RMS Empress of Britain for the return journey across the Atlantic in June.

Empress of Australia continued on the Quebec run until the outbreak of World War II, when she was requisitioned for war service.

=== Second World War service ===
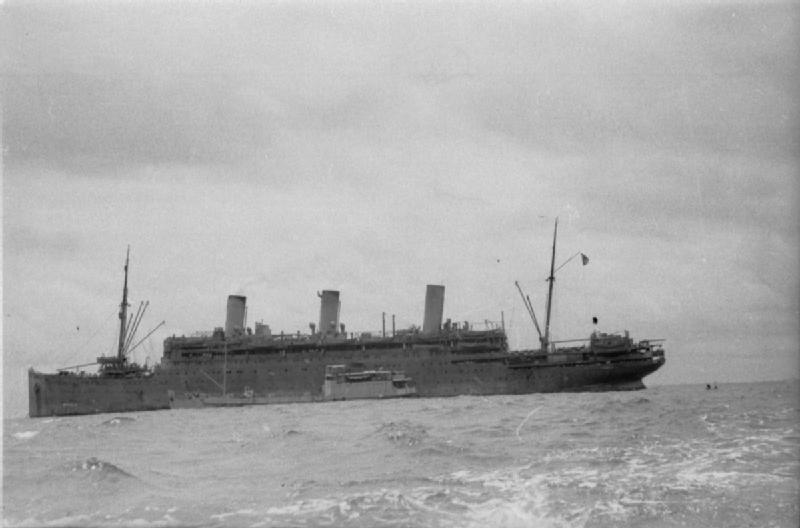
Empress of Australia as a World War II Troop Transport.

Empress of Australia was sent to Southampton to be converted into a troopship; painted in grey, fitted with a three-inch (76 mm) gun and with a carrying capacity of 5,000. It was in this role that she would remain for the next 13 years. Empress of Australia left on her first wartime voyage to Ceylon and Bombay on 28 September 1939. Following this task, the ship then went across the Atlantic to Halifax, from where she joined a large convoy carrying Canadian soldiers to Europe.

Throughout the war Empress of Australia enjoyed very good luck. In 1941, it was widely reported that she'd been torpedoed off the coast of Africa, but she survived that brush with disaster. She was only seriously damaged once, when she was holed by the Orient Line's 14,982 ton Ormonde during the North Africa campaign in January 1943. In 1945 she was sent to Okinawa carrying three RAF airfield construction squadrons in preparation for Operation Downfall. Japan surrendered before she reached her destination, and as a consequence she was diverted to take part in the reoccupation of Hong Kong by the British. On 3 September 1945 Empress of Australia was one of the first British ships to re-enter Hong Kong. Her final wartime voyage was from Hong Kong and Singapore with ex-prisoners of war and internees.

=== Post-war service ===
After World War II Empress of Australia operated worldwide as a troop ship, including carrying military personnel to Pusan during the Korean War.

In 1946 while anchoring off Liverpool her anchor fouled with that of the cargo liner Debrett; the two ships collided and seven tugs were needed to separate them. In December of that year, the liner was re-fitted for peace time trooping, offering more comfortable accommodations for the troops; She was repainted for post-war trooping operations on white with a blue line around the hull and yellow funnels. Notably, she ferried home the last British soldiers away from Bombay, just after they symbolically passed through the Gateway of India on 28 February 1948 following Indian independence in 1947. With this final act, centuries of British military presence in India were brought to an end.

The liner continued to carry troops up to another overhaul in Liverpool in 1951. The final voyage was a trooping operation from Hong Kong to Liverpool in 1952 bringing back British regiments and families including 58 Medium Regiment Royal Artillery during the course of which she was diverted to Mombasa in Kenya to collect British families stranded after the disastrous failure of the British government's Ground Nut Scheme. After this, her 70th trooping voyage the vessel was sold.

On 8 May 1952 the Empress sailed from the Mersey to the Thos W Ward ship breaking yard in Inverkeithing, where she was scrapped. In 1973, the oak carved panelling from the smoking lounge was installed in the Ships Room in the Visitor Centre of the Glenfarclas Distillery at Ballindalloch on Speyside.

== Technical ==
=== Power plant and propulsion system ===
- Engines: two sets of steam turbines; 20,000 shaft horsepower (15 MW); by Fairfield Co., Glasgow.
- Boilers: 6 double ended and 6 single ended boilers, 220 lbf/in^{2} (1.52 MPa) steam pressure; 600 degrees Fahrenheit of super heated steam. Oil fuel, forced draught to furnaces.

== See also ==
- CP Ships
- List of ocean liners
- List of ships in British Columbia
- Samuel Robinson – captain of Empress of Australia, 1 September 1923
- Ronald Neil Stuart – staff captain of Empress of Australia, 1927
- SS Empress of China
- Glenfarclas Single Malt – Panelling from the Empress of Australia's First Class Smoking Lounge, decorates the tasting room at the Glenfarclas Distillery.
