= Boulton baronets of Braxted Park (1944) =

Escutcheon of the Boulton baronets of Braxted Park

The Boulton baronetcy, of Braxted Park in the County of Essex, was created on 30 June 1944 in the Baronetage of the United Kingdom for the Conservative politician William Whytehead Boulton. He represented Sheffield Central in the House of Commons from 1931 to 1945. As of 2026 the title is held by his grandson, the 4th Baronet, who succeeded his father in 2010.

== Boulton baronets, of Braxted Park (1944) ==
- Sir William Whytehead Boulton, 1st Baronet (1873–1949)
- Sir Edward John Boulton, 2nd Baronet (1907–1982)
- Sir William Whytehead Boulton, 3rd Baronet (1912–2010)
- Sir John Gibson Boulton, 4th Baronet (born 1946); as of 2026 he has no heir.
