= Boulton baronets of Copped Hall (1905) =

The Boulton baronetcy, of Copped Hall, Totteridge, in the County of Hertford, was created in the Baronetage of the United Kingdom on 24 July 1905 for Samuel Bagster Boulton, the founder and chairman of the London Labour Conciliation Board. The title became extinct on the death of his great-grandson, the 4th Baronet, in 1996.

== Boulton baronets, of Copped Hall (1905) ==
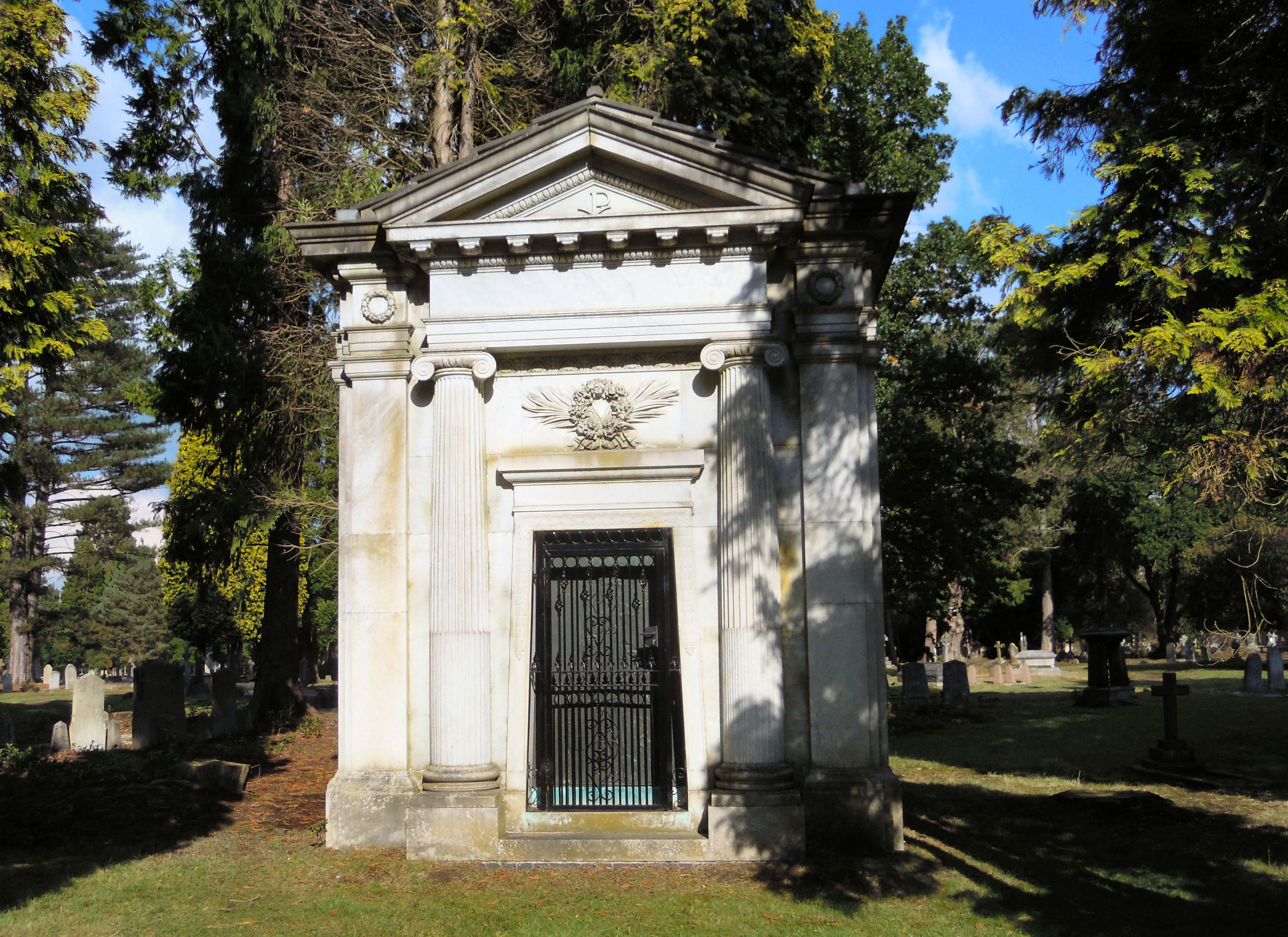
The Boulton family vault in Brookwood Cemetery

- Sir Samuel Bagster Boulton, 1st Baronet (1830–1918)
- Sir Harold Edwin Boulton, 2nd Baronet (1859–1935)
- Sir (Denis Duncan) Harold Owen Boulton, 3rd Baronet (1892–1968)
- Sir (Harold Hugh) Christian Boulton, 4th Baronet (1918–1996)

== Notes ==
Baronetage of the United Kingdom
Preceded by Morrison-Bell baronets	Boulton baronets of Copped Hall; 24 July 1905	Succeeded by Birkin baronets
