= Nairn baronets =

Escutcheon of the Nairn baronets of Rankeilour and Dysart House

The Nairn baronetcy, of Rankeilour, Collessie, and Dysart House, Dysart, in the County of Fife, was created in the Baronetage of the United Kingdom on 16 December 1904 for the Scottish businessman Michael Nairn. He was Chairman of Michael Nairn & Co, linoleum manufacturers, of Kirkcaldy, and of the Nairn Linoleum Co, of Kearny, United States.

== Nairn baronets, of Rankeilour and Dysart House (1904) ==
- Sir Michael Barker Nairn, 1st Baronet (1838–1915)
- Sir Michael Nairn, 2nd Baronet (1874–1952)
- Sir (Michael) George Nairn, 3rd Baronet (1911–1984)
- Sir Michael Nairn, 4th Baronet (born 1938)

The heir apparent is the present holder's son Michael Andrew Nairn (born 1973).

== See also ==
- Spencer-Nairn baronets
- Nairne baronets

== Notes ==
Baronetage of the United Kingdom
Preceded by Heath baronets	Nairn baronets of Rankeilour and Dysart House; 16 December 1904	Succeeded by Monson baronets
