= Sir William Boulton, 3rd Baronet =

Sir William Whytehead Boulton, 3rd Baronet, CBE (21 June 1912 – 20 June 2010) was a prominent British barrister who served in the reconstruction of the German legal profession after the Second World War and then spent 25 years as Secretary of the Bar Council. In this capacity he managed relations within the English legal profession and its relations internationally, as well as establishing the Senate of the Four Inns of Court that handles disciplinary action and organising the 750th anniversary of the signing of Magna Carta and establishing a permanent memorial at the site. He also wrote Conduct and Etiquette at the Bar, which was the standard guide to the decisions of the General Council of the Bar for 25 years.

== Life ==
Boulton was born in 1912 at Braxted Park in Essex to the politician Sir William Boulton, 1st Baronet, and attended Eton College before joining Trinity College, Cambridge. His academic record was not distinguished, but he was able to enter the Inner Temple in 1936 as a practising barrister. At the outbreak of the Second World War, Boulton, who was already with the Essex Yeomanry, joined the Royal Horse Artillery and served in North Africa. In 1940 he took part in Operation Compass, fighting at the Battle of Bardia and then the Siege of Tobruk, where he contracted jaundice and was evacuated to Alexandria. He returned to frontline service soon afterwards but was badly wounded in a land mine explosion.

He spent much of the rest of the war recovering in Cairo, where he met his future wife Margaret Elizabeth Hunter. After the war he left the army as a lieutenant colonel and was employed with the Allied Control Council, helping to re-establish the German legal profession while excluding those members with Nazi sympathies. He returned to Britain in 1950 and became Secretary of the Bar Council. This position entailed a wide range of legal and diplomatic responsibilities including the organisation of law reform, managing relations with the Law Society and with foreign legal representatives, organising legal aid and even planning the 750th anniversary of the signing of Magna Carta, establishing the first permanent memorial on the site. One of his most important roles was as author in 1953 of the standard guide to the decisions of the General Council of the Bar, named Conduct and Etiquette at the Bar, which was presented to every newly qualified barrister until well into the 1980s. Shortly before his retirement in 1975, Boulton was heavily involved in the establishment of the Senate of the Inns of Court and the Bar, which handles internal disciplinary matters.

In the Queen's Birthday Honours 1958, Boulton was appointed as a Commander of the Order of the British Empire (CBE). On his retirement, Boulton was knighted in the 1975 New Year Honours. He later inherited the Boulton Baronetcy, of Braxted Park, on the death of his elder brother in 1983.

He died in 2010, survived by his wife, two daughters and son who inherited the baronetcy. Lady Boulton died in 2016 at the age of 97.

Baronetage of the United Kingdom
Preceded by Edward Boulton	Baronet (of Braxted Park); 1983–2010	Succeeded by John Boulton
