= Empress of China (disambiguation) =

Empress of China was the consort of an Emperor of China.

Empress of China may also refer to:

- Empress of China (1783), a sailing ship built as a privateer; the first American ship to sail from the newly independent United States to China
- RMS Empress of China, three Canadian Pacific Steamships ocean liners, one from 1891 to 1912, the other two briefly named Empress of China in 1921
- The Empress of China (film), a 1953 West German film
- The Empress of China, a 2014 Chinese television drama series starring Fan Bingbing as a character based on the historical character Wu Zetian
