= RMS Empress of France (1913) =

1913 liner

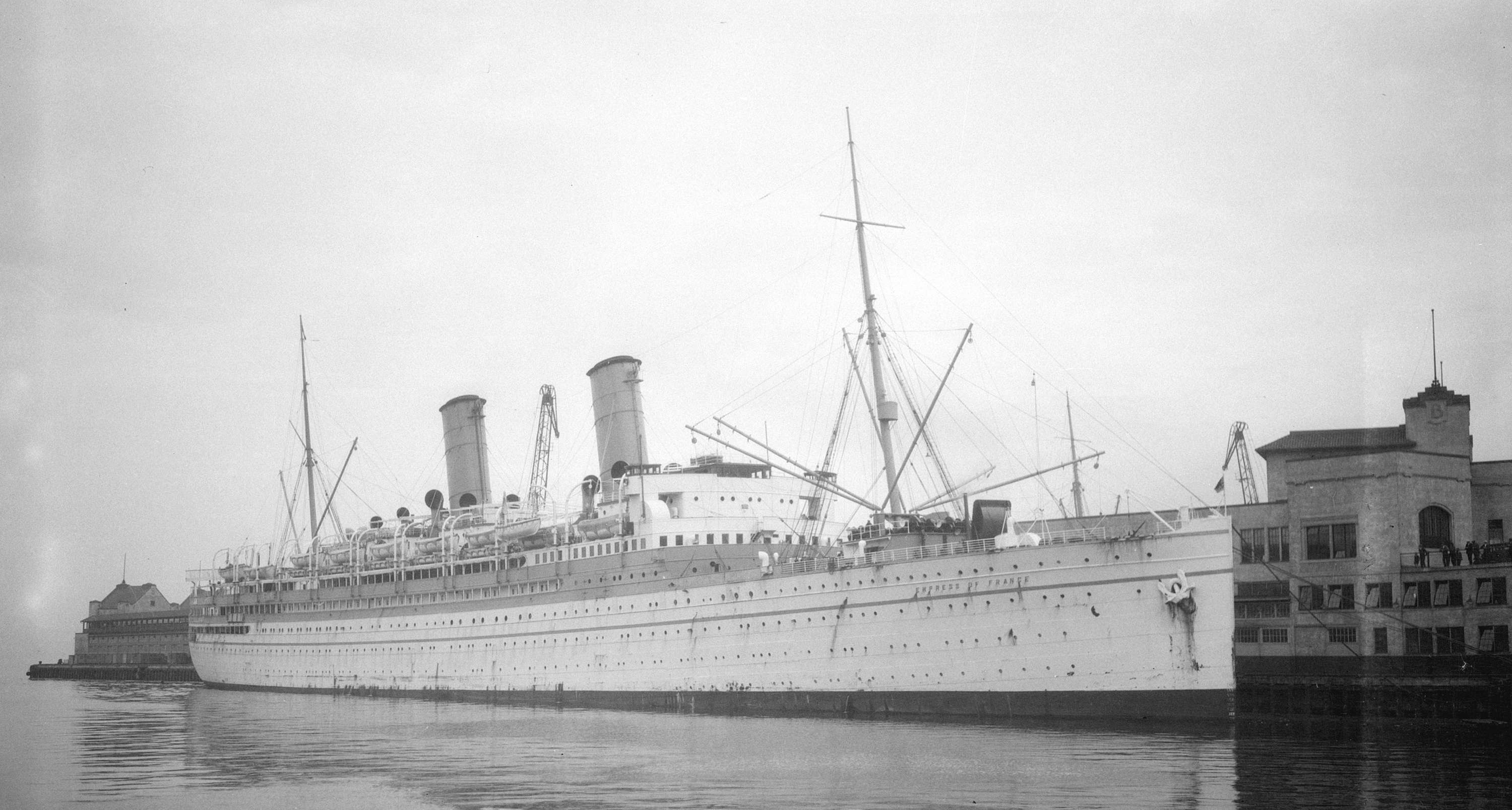
- Empress of France at Pier B, Vancouver

History

United Kingdom
- Name: Alsatian
- Owner: Allan Line, Liverpool
- Port of registry: United Kingdom
- Launched: 22 March 1913
- Maiden voyage: 17 January 1914
- Fate: Sold to Canadian Pacific Ocean Service in 1919

United Kingdom
- Name: Empress of France
- Owner: Canadian Pacific Ocean Service
- Port of registry: Canada
- Fate: Scrapped 1934

General characteristics
- Type: Ocean liner
- Tonnage: 18,481 GRT
- Length: 571.4 ft (174.2 m)
- Beam: 72.4 ft (22.1 m),
- Propulsion: turbines driving 4 shafts
- Speed: 18 knots

RMS Empress of France, formerly SS Alsatian was an ocean liner built in 1913–1914 by William Beardmore and Company at Glasgow in Scotland for Allan Line. In total, the ship's service history encompasses 99 trans-Atlantic voyages, 5 trans-Pacific voyages, and 8 other cruises in addition to her war service.

== Service ==
This ship was the first North Atlantic liner with a cruiser stern. The vessel was built by William Beardmore & Co Ltd. at Glasgow. She was an 18,481 gross register tonnage ship, length 571.4 ft x beam 72.4 ft (22.1 m), two funnels, two masts, four propellers and a speed of 18 knots. Her initial configuration provided accommodation for 287 1st class, 504 2nd class and 848 3rd class passengers.

The ocean liner was initially launched as SS Alsatian on 22 March 1912. She sailed from Liverpool on her maiden voyage to Saint John, New Brunswick for the Allan Line on 17 January 1914. On 22 May 1914, set out on her first trans-Atlantic crossing from Liverpool to Quebec.

A postcard version of a painting of Alsatian which was commissioned by the Allan Line for this publicity and advertising purpose. The artist was Odin Rosenvinge.

Her last voyage that summer began on 17 July 1914; and when she returned to Europe, the nascent war in Europe brought a close to this truncated peacetime period of the ship's history.

=== World War I ===
During the First World War, Alsatian was converted into an Armed Merchant Cruiser, with an initial armament of eight 4.7-inch (120-mm) guns, although she was later re-armed with eight 6-inch (152-mm) guns and two 6-pounder (57-mm) anti-aircraft guns. Following conversion, she joined the 10th Cruiser Squadron patrolling off the Shetland Islands as part of the Northern Patrol maintaining the blockade of Germany. HMS Alsatian became flagship for Rear-Admiral Sir Dudley de Chair. Later, Alsatian served as flagship for Vice-Admiral Sir Reginald Tupper. During the war years, she became one of the first ships to be fitted with the new wireless direction-finding apparatus. After the squadron was retired in 1917, she was re-fitted for peacetime service.

=== Between the wars ===
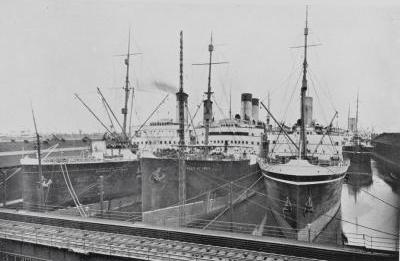
Three steamships docked together, Empress of France, Empress of India, and Empress of Britain.

At war's end, the ship was added to the fleet of Canadian Pacific Ocean Services Ltd. (CP), which absorbed the entire Allan Line fleet. On 28 September 1918, Alsatian began her first voyage from Liverpool to Canada as a newly flagged ship of the Canadian Pacific fleet. After a second, trans-Atlantic voyage, Alsatian was taken out of service for refitting at Glasgow.

The ship was renamed Empress of France on 4 April 1919.

The first voyage as Empress of France began on 26 September 1919. She sailed from Liverpool to Quebec. On 20 December 1919, steerage passengers from the liner, which had docked in Saint John, New Brunswick, the previous day, were involved in a railway head-on collision near Onawa, Maine.

On 3 May 1922, her regular route was changed; and she sailed between Southampton, Cherbourg and Quebec. On 31 May 1922, the route was modified yet again; and she sailed between Hamburg, Southampton, Cherbourg and Quebec.

Empress of France was one of four ocean liners to circumnavigate the world in 1923.

In 1924, the ship was converted from coal to oil fuel. In July 1926, her interiors were re-configured as 1st-class, 2nd-class, tourist-class and 3rd-class accommodations. In January 1927, the interior was again re-configured as 1st-class, tourist-class and 3rd-class.

== Voyages ==
Departure	From	Arrival	To	Notes and notable passengers	Source
26 September 1919	Liverpool, United Kingdom	5 October 1919	Montreal, Quebec, Canada		
October 1919	Quebec, Canada	16 October 1919	Liverpool, United Kingdom		
21 October 1919	Liverpool, United Kingdom	28 October 1919	Quebec, Canada		
November 1919	Quebec, Canada	8 November 1919	Liverpool, United Kingdom	Marquess of Anglesey	
14 November 1919	Liverpool, United Kingdom	21 November 1919	Montreal, Quebec, Canada		
November 1919	Quebec, Canada	3 December 1919	Liverpool, United Kingdom	Harrison Watson, Canadian Government's Chief Trade Commissioner in the United Kingdom	
7 January 1920	Liverpool, United Kingdom	16 January 1920	Saint John, New Brunswick, Canada		
21 January 1920	Saint John, New Brunswick, Canada	29 January 1920	Liverpool, United Kingdom	Lady Dorothy Cavendish, daughter of the Duke of Devonshire (Governor General of Canada) Captain Harold Macmillan, Aide-de-Camp to the Duke	
February 1920	Liverpool, United Kingdom	28 February 1920	Saint John, New Brunswick, Canada		
12 March 1920	Saint John, New Brunswick, Canada	22 March 1920	Liverpool, United Kingdom	Duke of Devonshire	
April 1920	Saint John, New Brunswick, Canada	19 April 1920	Liverpool, United Kingdom		
1 May 1920	England	May 1920	Quebec, Canada	Duke of Devonshire Duchess of Devonshire Sir James McKechnie, Head of Vickers	
May 1920	Quebec, Canada	22 May 1920	Liverpool, United Kingdom		
June 1920	Quebec, Canada	24 June 1920	Liverpool, United Kingdom		
30 June 1920	Liverpool, United Kingdom	8 July 1920	Quebec, Canada		
July 1920	Quebec, Canada	22 July 1920	Liverpool, United Kingdom		
August 1920	Quebec, Canada	18 August 1920	Liverpool, United Kingdom		
September 1920	Quebec, Canada	15 September 1920	Liverpool, United Kingdom		
October 1920	Quebec, Canada	13 October 1920	Liverpool, United Kingdom		
November 1920	Quebec, Canada	10 November 1920	Liverpool, United Kingdom		
15 December 1920	Liverpool, United Kingdom	23 December 1920	Saint John, NB, Canada		
27 July 1922	Southampton, United Kingdom		Quebec and Montreal, Canada		
September 1922	Southampton, United Kingdom		Quebec and Montreal, Canada		
8 August 1923	Southampton, United Kingdom	14 August 1923	Quebec, Canada	Sir Herbert Samuel Holt, president of the Royal Bank of Canada	
5 September 1923	Southampton, United Kingdom	September 1923	Quebec, Canada		
4 October 1923		October 1923	Canada		
9 February 1926	New York, NY	5 June 1926	Quebec, Canada	via Mediterranean and Southampton, UK	
26 June 1926	Southampton, United Kingdom	3 July 1926	Quebec, Canada		
30 April 1927	Southampton, United Kingdom	May 1927	Quebec, Canada	via Cherbourg, France	
7 January 1928	Southampton, United Kingdom		West Indies, South America, South Africa, East Africa, Egypt, Mediterranean		
July 1928	Quebec, Canada	18 July 1928	Southampton, United Kingdom		
6 September 1930	Southampton, United Kingdom	September 1930	Quebec, Canada	via Cherbourg, France	
18 April 1931	Southampton, United Kingdom	April 1931	Montreal, Canada	via Cherbourg, France	
5 August 1931	Southampton, United Kingdom	August 1931	Quebec, Canada	Lord Shaughnessy, Lieutenant Colonel Sir Martin Archer-Shee	

On 9 September 1927, Empress of France set out on what was to be her final Hamburg - Southampton - Cherbourg - Quebec voyage. On 8 September 1928, she sailed on final Southampton - Cherbourg - Quebec voyage before being transferred to the Pacific.

On 31 October 1928, she sailed from Southampton for Suez, Hong Kong and Vancouver. Subsequently sailed on the Pacific until 17 October 1929 when she left Hong Kong en route to Liverpool.

On 2 September 1931, Empress of France set out for what was to be her final voyage from Southampton to Cherbourg and Quebec; and in then she was laid up in the Clyde. Empress of France was scrapped at Dalmuir on 20 October 1934. Some of its interior timber panelling was used in the extension (completed in 1937) of St John the Baptist's Catholic Church in Padiham, Lancashire.

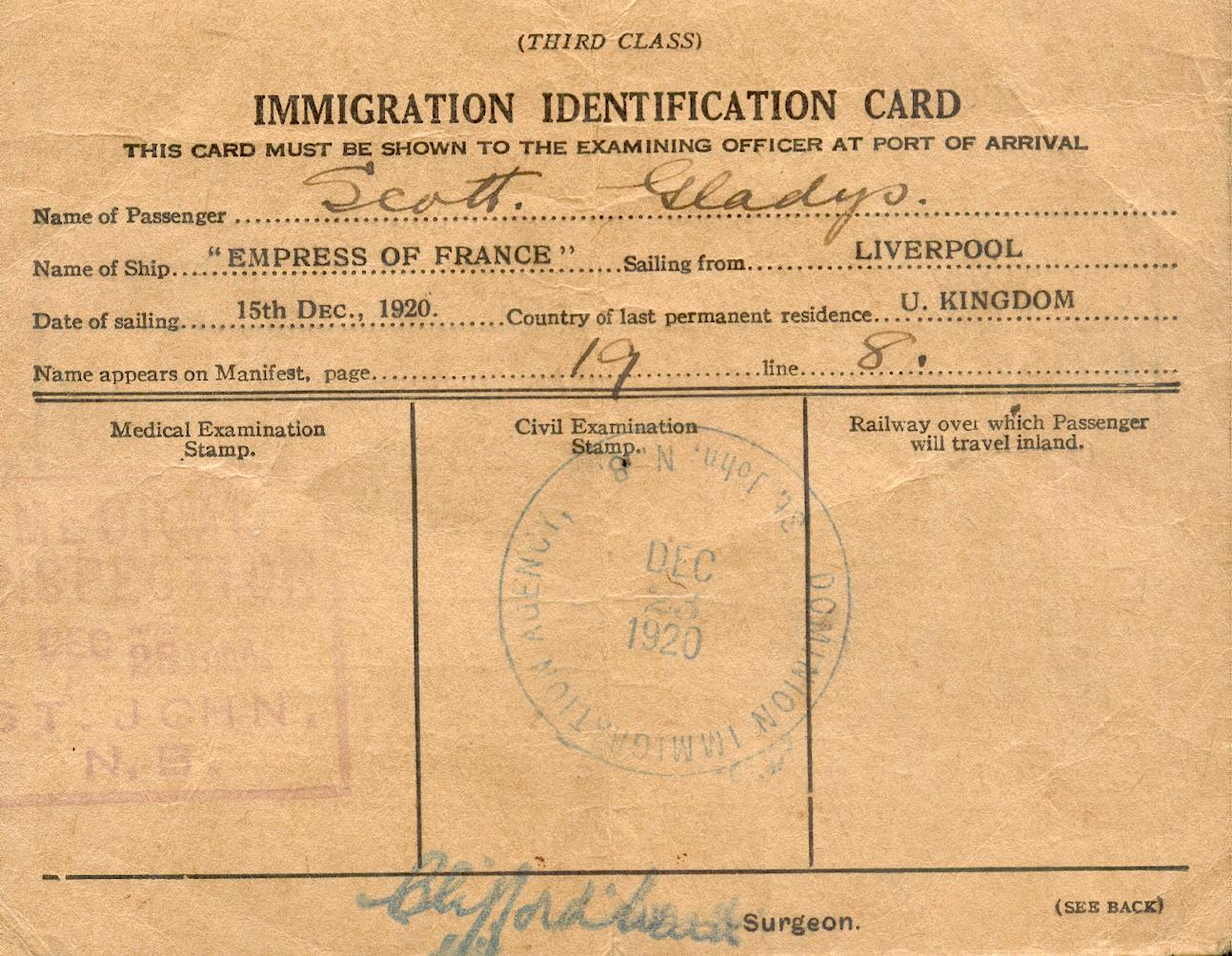
Immigration card for a passenger on the Empress of France, 1920

== Notable passengers ==
- 1923

- Prince of Wales
- Sir Harold and Lady Boulton

== See also ==
- CP Ships
- List of ocean liners
- List of ships in British Columbia
- Ronald Niel Stuart VC, DSO, Staff Captain (1924–1926)
- HMS Calgarian - Alsatian's sister ship

== Bibliography ==
- Dittmar, F. J.; Colledge, J. J. (1972). British Warships 1914–1919. Shepperton, UK: Ian Allan. ISBN 0-7110-0380-7.
- Jellicoe, John (1919). The Grand Fleet 1914–16: Its Creation, Development and Work. London: Cassell and Company. OCLC 859842281.
- Osborne, Richard; Spong, Harry; Grover, Tom (2007). Armed Merchant Cruisers 1878–1945. Windsor, UK: World Warship Society. ISBN 978-0-9543310-8-5.
- Tate, E. Mowbray. (1986). Transpacific Steam: The Story of Steam Navigation from the Pacific Coast of North America to the Far East and the Antipodes, 1867-1941. New York: Cornwall Books. ISBN 978-0-8453-4792-8 (cloth)
