= Birkin baronets =

Baronetcy in the Baronetage of the United Kingdom

Coat of arms of Birkin baronets

The Birkin Baronetcy, of Ruddington Grange in the parish of Ruddington in the County of Nottingham, is a title in the Baronetage of the United Kingdom. It was created on 25 July 1905 for the businessman Thomas Isaac Birkin. He was a lace manufacturer, a director of the Great Northern Railway and of the Mercantile Steamship Company. His grandson, the 3rd Baronet, was a racing driver. He died without male issue and was succeeded by his uncle, the 4th Baronet who was succeeded by his nephew, the 5th Baronet. As of 2026 the title is held by the latter's son, the 6th Baronet.

== Birkin baronets, of Ruddington Grange (1905) ==
- Sir Thomas Isaac Birkin, 1st Baronet (1831–1922)
- Sir Thomas Stanley Birkin, 2nd Baronet (1857–1931)
- Sir Henry Ralph Stanley "Tim" Birkin, 3rd Baronet (1896–1933)

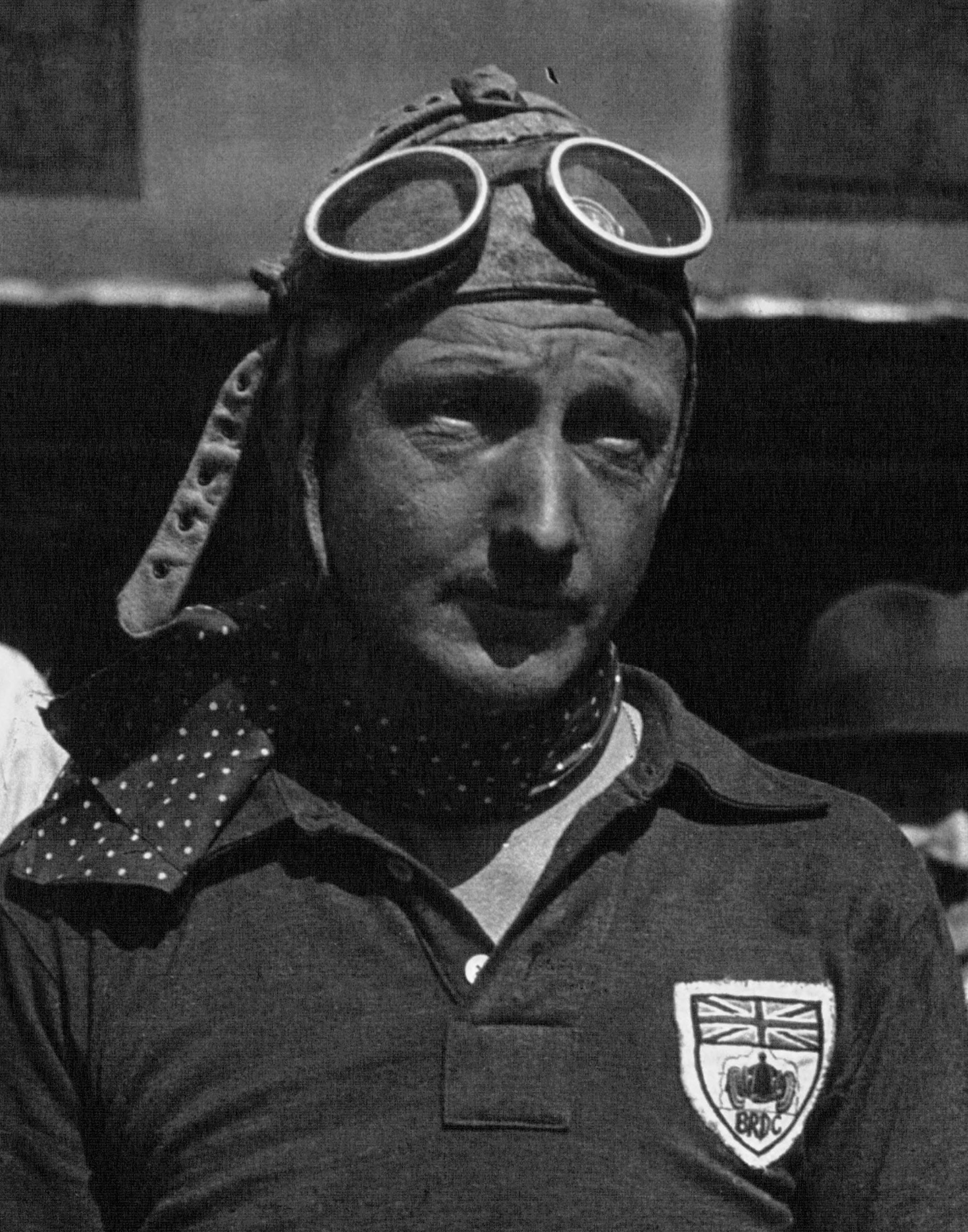
"Tim" Birkin, 3rd Baronet, 1931 photograph at the 24 Hours of Le Mans

  - Charles Archibald Cecil Birkin (1905–1927)
- Sir Alexander Russell Birkin, 4th Baronet (1861–1942)
- Sir Charles Lloyd Birkin, 5th Baronet (1907–1985)
- Sir John Christian William Birkin, 6th Baronet (b. 1953)

The heir apparent to the baronetcy is the 6th Baronet's eldest son, Benjamin Charles Birkin (b. 1995).

Coat of arms: Argent, a cross raguly couped vert, in the first and fourth quarters a bee volant and in the second and third a birchtree eradicated all proper. Crest: On a wreath of the colours, a scorpion erect proper. Motto: Pace et bello paratus.

== Extended family ==
- Thomas Richard Chetwynd Birkin (1895–1917), killed in action, eldest son of the 2nd Baronet.
- Archie Birkin (1905–1927), racing car driver; third son of the 2nd Baronet
- Freda Dudley Ward born Winifred May Birkin (1894–1983), royal mistress, granddaughter of the 1st Baronet
- Jane Birkin (1946–2023), actress; daughter of David Leslie Birkin, a grandson of the 1st Baronet
- Sarah Rose Hanbury (Rose, Marchioness of Cholmondeley), British peeress; great-granddaughter of the 3rd Baronet

== Notes ==
Baronetage of the United Kingdom
Preceded by Boulton baronets	Birkin baronets of Ruddington Grange; 25 July 1905	Succeeded by Cooper baronets
