= Peter Du Cane Sr. =

British merchant and businessman (1713–1803)

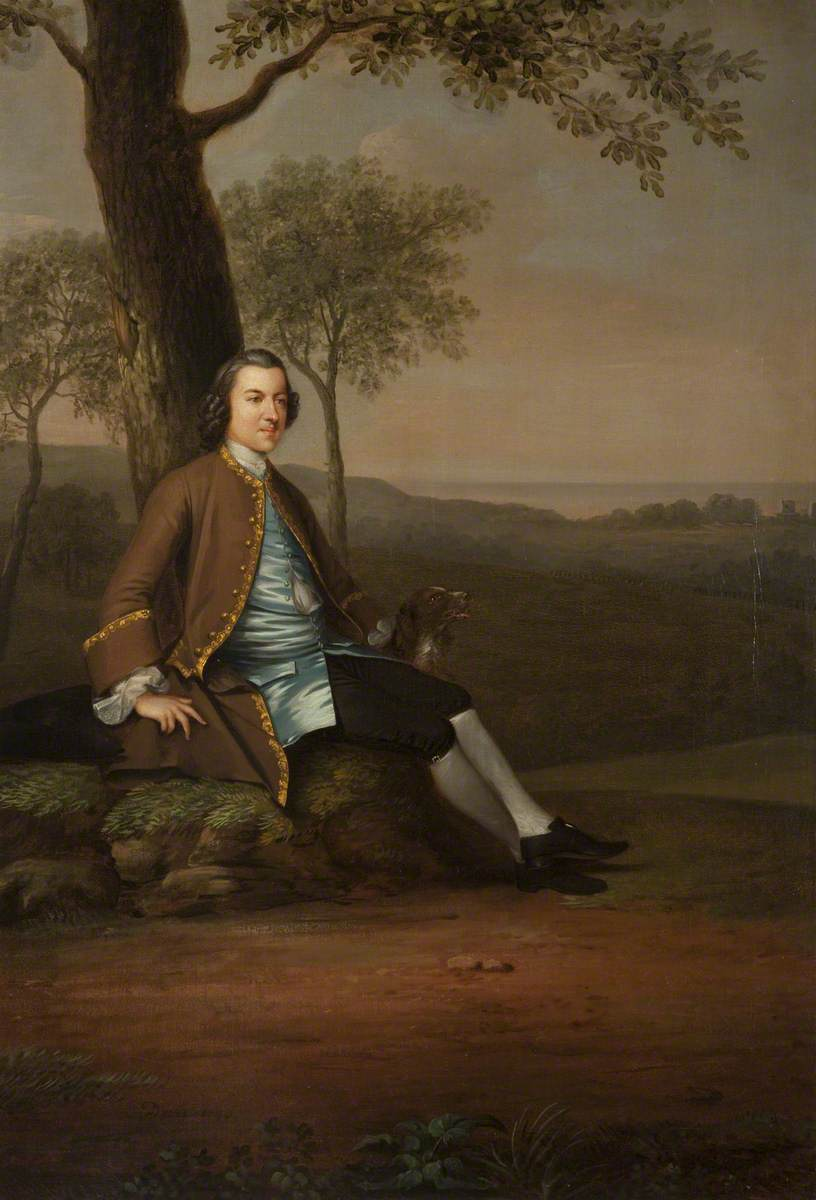

Peter Du Cane (22 April 1713 – 28 March 1803), a descendant of Jean Du Quesne, the elder and son of Richard Du Cane, M.P., was a leading 18th century British merchant and businessman . Du Cane amassed great wealth in land and fund holdings, as well as in marine insurance.

He was High Sheriff of Essex in 1744–5, a Director of the Bank of England, a Director of the East India Company from 1750 to 1753, vice-president of the London Infirmary, and patron of the vicarage at Coggeshall where he was lord of the manor. In 1745, he established the family at Braxted Park in Essex. In 1735, Du Cane married a wealthy heiress, Mary Norris, the only daughter of Henry Norris (1677–1762) of Hackney, another London businessman and Justice of the Peace with extensive trading interests in Russia.

Du Cane's portrait, painted while travelling in Italy by Austrian artist Anton von maron (1733–1808) hangs in the Birmingham Museum and Art Gallery. In another painting by Arthur Devis (1712–1787) known as the 'Du Cane Triptych' (1747), the Du Cane family are depicted in the grounds of their house at Braxted Park. The house itself appears in the middle distance of the central panel depicting the three Du Cane children.
