= Samuel Boulton =

British businessman (1830-1918)

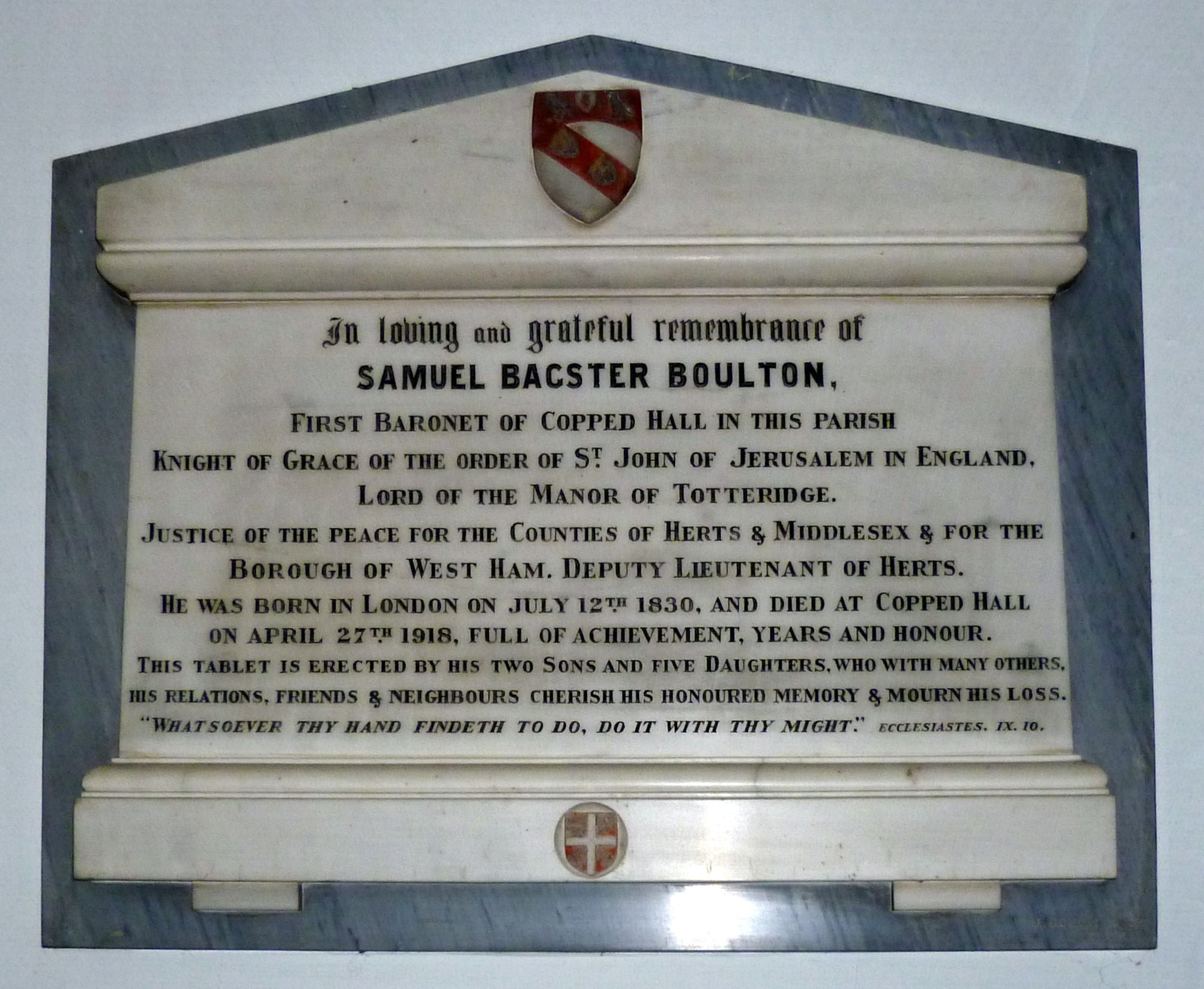
Samuel Bagster Boulton plaque in St Andrew's church, Totteridge.

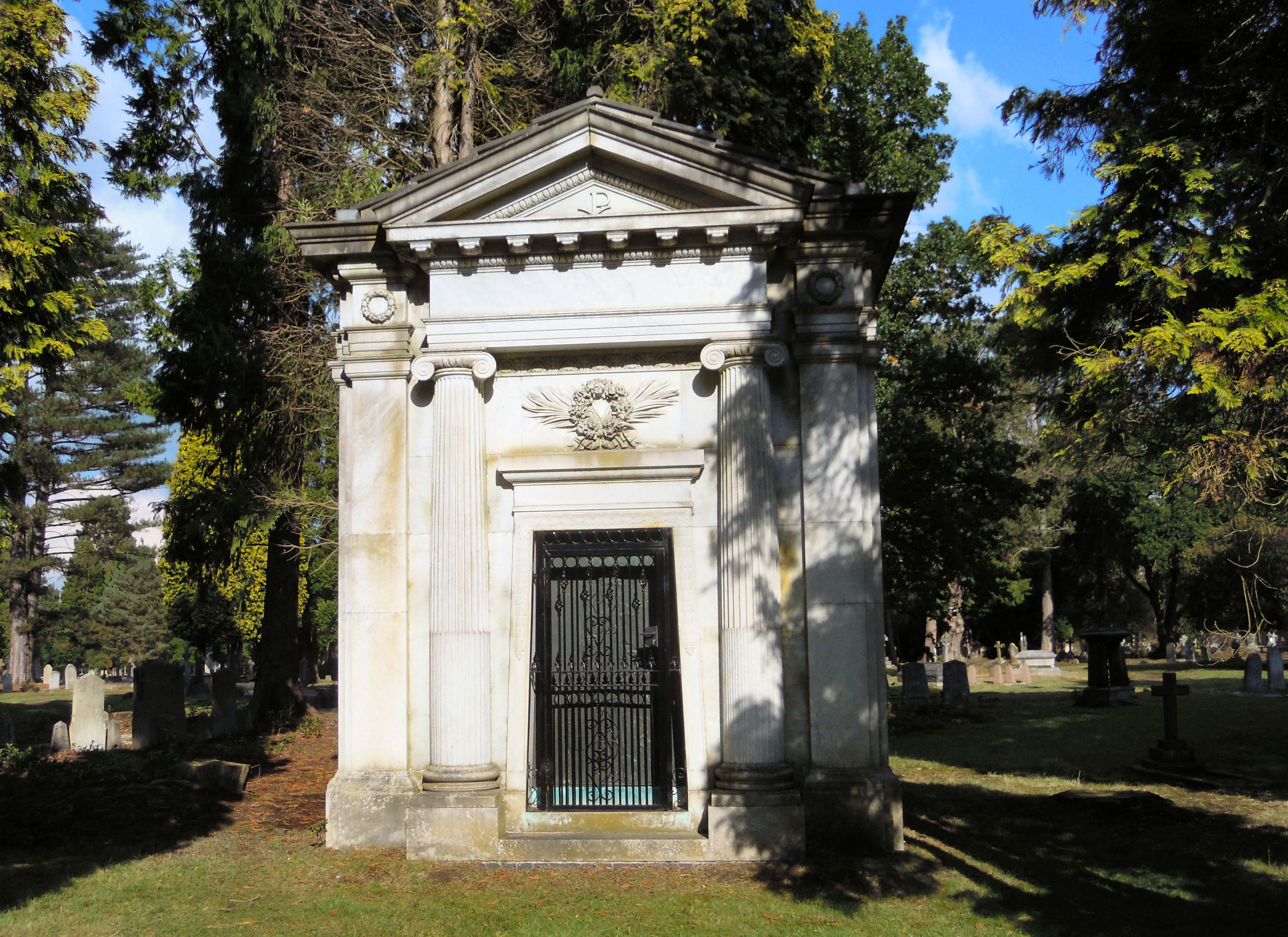
Family vault in Brookwood Cemetery where Samuel Boulton is buried

Sir Samuel Bagster Boulton, 1st Baronet DL JP KStJ FRGS (12 July 1830 – 27 April 1918) was a British businessman. A successful timber merchant and contractor, he served in many roles, including as an arbitrator in labour disputes. He was the first baronet of Copped Hall, a Knight of Grace of the Order of St John of Jerusalem in England, Lord of the Manor of Totteridge, Justice of the Peace, and Deputy Lieutenant of Hertfordshire.

== Early life ==
Boulton was born in 1830 in London, the third but only surviving son of Rev. Thomas Boulton and Rhoda Parker.

== Career ==
In 1848, he founded a timber-merchants and contractor business with H. P. Burt. The company was a success and developed into the firm of Burt, Boulton and Haywood, Limited, formerly of London, Paris, Selzaete, Bilbao and Riga, which continues to this day. Boulton became the chairman of the expanded firm and was also the chairman of the Dominion Tar and Chemical Company (Limited), and of the British Australian Timber Company (Limited).

Boulton was a keen promoter of scientific method in the chemical and allied industries and contributed to the literature on the subject. In 1884 he was awarded the Telford Medal by the Institution of Civil Engineers. In later life he also sat on various boards concerned with the improvement of commerce: he was Chairman of the London Labour Conciliation and Arbitration Board from 1889 to 1913, Vice-President of the London Chamber of Commerce from 1893 to 1898 and President of the West Ham Chamber of Commerce from 1893 to 1902. On 18 July 1905, in recognition of his achievements and contributions to British commerce and industry, he was created a baronet.

== Family and death ==
Boulton married Sophia Louisa, the daughter of Thomas Cooper, and had two sons and five daughters. His daughter Mabel was the well-known field-hospital commander and author Mrs. St Clair Stobart.

Sir Samuel Boulton died in 1918 at Totteridge and was succeeded in the baronetcy by his son Harold. He was buried in the Boulton family vault in Brookwood Cemetery and is also commemorated with a plaque in his own local church: St Andrew's, Totteridge.

Baronetage of the United Kingdom
New creation	Baronet (of Copped Hall); 1905–1918	Succeeded by Harold Boulton
