= Spencer-Nairn baronets =

The Spencer-Nairn baronetcy, of Monimail in the County of Fife, was created in the Baronetage of the United Kingdom on 20 January 1933 for Robert Spencer-Nairn, a Major in the Fife and Forfar Yeomanry. Born Robert Nairn, he was the second son of the 1st Baronet of the Nairn baronets (1904 creation) by his wife Emily Frances, daughter of Alfred Rimington Spencer. In 1928 he adopted the additional surname of Spencer.

== Spencer-Nairn baronets, of Monimail (1933) ==
- Sir Robert Spencer-Nairn, 1st Baronet (1880–1960)
- Sir Douglas Leslie Spencer-Nairn, 2nd Baronet (1906–1970)
- Sir Robert Arnold Spencer-Nairn, 3rd Baronet (1933–2025)
- Sir James Robert Spencer-Nairn, 4th Baronet (born 1966)

The heir apparent is the present holder's son Alastair Charles Spencer-Nairn (born 1999).
