= Morrison-Bell baronets of Otterburn Hall (1905) =

The Morrison-Bell baronetcy, of Otterburn Hall in Elsdon in the County of Northumberland, was created in the Baronetage of the United Kingdom on 18 December 1905 for Charles Morrison-Bell. Born Charles Bell, he assumed by Royal licence the additional surname and arms of Morrison in 1905. His mother Mary Wilhelmina Morrison was the daughter and heiress of Royal Navy officer John Morrison.

== Morrison-Bell baronets, of Otterburn Hall (1905) ==
- Sir Charles William Morrison-Bell, 1st Baronet (1833–1914)
- Sir Claude William Hedley Morrison-Bell, 2nd Baronet (1867–1943)
- Sir Charles Reginald Francis Morrison-Bell, 3rd Baronet (1915–1967)
- Sir William Hollin Dayrell Morrison-Bell, 4th Baronet (born 1956)

The heir apparent to the baronetcy is the present holder's son, Thomas Charles Edward (born 13 February 1985).

== Notes ==
Baronetage of the United Kingdom
| Preceded by Monson baronets | Morrison-Bell baronets of Otterburn Hall; 18 July 1905 | Succeeded by Boulton baronets |
