= Harold Boulton =

English baronet, songwriter, and philanthropist

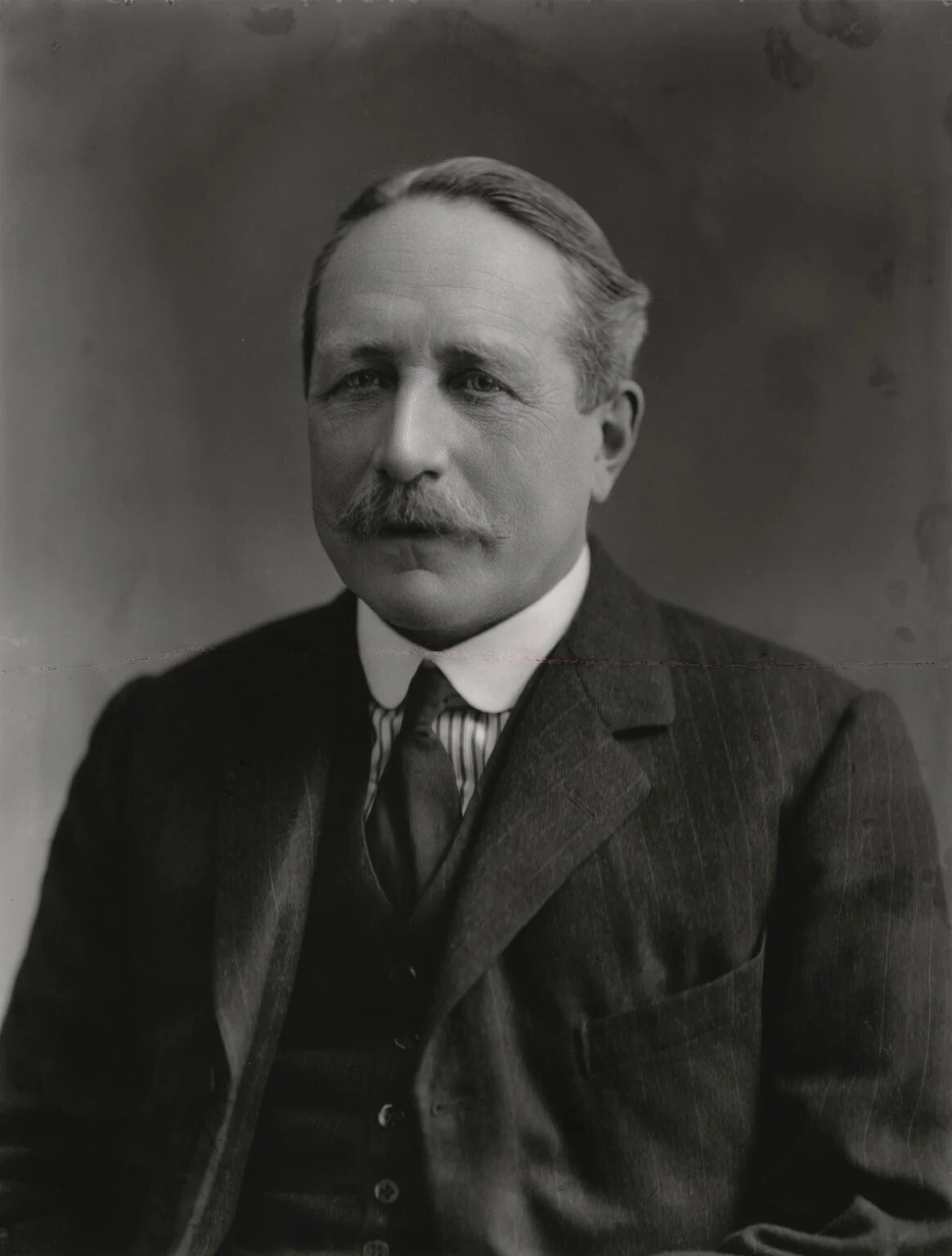
Harold Boulton in 1918

Sir Harold Edwin Boulton, 2nd Baronet, CVO, CBE, JP (7 August 1859 – 1 June 1935), son of Sir Samuel Bagster Boulton, 1st Baronet of Copped Hall, born in Charlton then part of Kent, was an English baronet, songwriter, and philanthropist, most famously author of the lyrics to the "Skye Boat Song". He first became interested in Scottish folk songs as an undergraduate at Oxford.

A photographic portrait of Boulton is in the National Portrait Gallery collection.

He married first to Adelaide Lucy Davidson, daughter of Duncan Davidson of Tulloch Castle, and had three children, Louise Kythé Veronica Boulton (18 September 1890 – 21 May 1934), Christian Harold Ernest Boulton (17 February 1897 – 12 October 1917) and Denis Duncan Harold Owen Boulton, 3rd Baronet Boulton, known as "Harold" (10 December 1892 – 10 August 1968), who was a survivor of the 1915 sinking of the RMS Lusitania.

After his first wife's death on 26 April 1926, he was married again to Margaret Cunningham Lyons, daughter of James Lennox Lyons, on 29 December 1926.

Baronetage of the United Kingdom
Preceded by Samuel Boulton	Baronet (of Copped Hall); 1918–1935	Succeeded by Harold Boulton
