= Monson baronets of Thatched House Lodge (1905) =

Escutcheon of the Monson baronets of Thatched House Lodge

The Monson baronetcy, of Thatched House Lodge in the County of Surrey, was created in the Baronetage of the United Kingdom on 23 February 1905 for the Hon. Edmund Monson, who had held a number of diplomatic posts, ultimately British Ambassador to France from 1896 to 1904. He was the fourth son of the 6th Baron Monson.

The 2nd Baronet had no sons, and was succeeded by his two brothers. The 3rd Baronet was also a British diplomat. The title became extinct on the death of the 4th Baronet in 1969, who left no heir.

== Monson baronets, of Thatched House Lodge (1905) ==
- Sir Edmund John Monson, 1st Baronet (1834–1909)
- Sir Maxwell William Edmund John Monson, 2nd Baronet (1882–1936)
- Sir Edmund St. John Debonnaire John Monson, 3rd Baronet (1883–1969)
- Sir George Louis Esmé John Monson, 4th Baronet (1888–1969)

== Notes ==
Baronetage of the United Kingdom
Preceded by Nairn baronets	Monson baronets of Thatched House Lodge; 23 February 1905	Succeeded by Morrison-Bell baronets
