= MV Éridan =

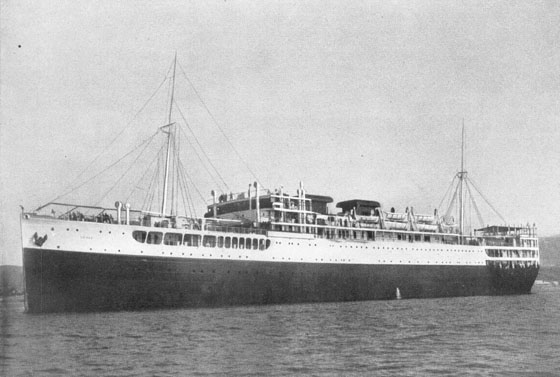
- MV Éridan in 1929 with square funnels

History
- Name: Éridan
- Namesake: Eridanus.
- Owner: Société des Services Contractuels des Messageries Maritimes (1929–45); Compagnie des Messageries Maritimes (1945–56)
- Port of registry: Dunkerque, France (1928–40); Vichy France (1940–42); (France) Dunkerque (1942–56)
- Builder: Société Provençale de Construction Navales
- Launched: 3 June 1928
- Identification: Code Letters OSQY (1928–34); Code Letters FOAU (1934–56)
- Fate: Scrapped

General characteristics
- Tonnage: 9,928 GRT, 5,701 NRT
- Displacement: 14,135 tons
- Length: 142.82 metres (468 ft 7 in) overall, 135.00 metres (442 ft 11 in) between perpendiculars
- Beam: 18.59 metres (61 ft 0 in)
- Draught: 8.26 metres (27 ft 1 in)
- Depth: 14.10 metres (46 ft 3 in)
- Installed power: 2 × Sulzer diesel engines, 1,555 nhp
- Propulsion: Twin screw propellers
- Speed: 16.1 knots (29.8 km/h)
- Capacity: 56 first class, 86 second class and 436 third class passengers (1928–42); 182 officers and 2,132 soldiers (1942–46); 95 first class, 112 second class passengers and 900 troops (1947–56); 10,680 cubic metres (13,970 yd^{3}) cargo space (as built)

Éridan was a French cargo liner built in 1928 by the Société Provençale de Construction Navales for the Société des Services Contractuels des Messageries Maritimes, a subsidiary of the Compagnie des Messageries Maritimes. She came under Vichy French control during the Second World War, and passed to the Compagnie des Messageries Maritimes. She served until 1956, when she was scrapped.

== Description ==
The ship was 142.82 metres (468 ft 7 in) overall, 135.00 metres (442 ft 11 in) between perpendiculars, with a beam of 18.59 metres (61 ft 0 in). She had a depth of 14.10 metres (46 ft 3 in) and a draught of 8.26 metres (27 ft 1 in). She was assessed at 9,928 GRT, 5,701 NRT, with a displacement of 14,135 tons.

She was equipped with two eight-cylinder two-stroke Sulzer diesel engines, driving twin screw propellers, each of four blades. The engines had cylinders 60 centimetres (23 5/8 in) diameter by 106 centimetres (41 3/4 in) stroke. They were rated at 1,555nhp. In trials, a speed of 16.1 knots (29.8 km/h) was achieved. Electricity throughout the ship was produced by five dynamos, of which two were required at any one time. As built, she had two square funnels. In January 1930 it was reported that it had been decided to change these to more conventional round funnels. The change never happened.

She had provision for 56 first class, 86 second class and 436 third class passengers. Cargo space amounted to 10,680 cubic metres (13,970 yd^{3}).

== History ==
Éridan was built in 1928 by the Société Provençale de Construction Navales. La Ciotat, Bouches-du-Rhône, France for the Société des Services Contractuels des Messageries Maritimes, a subsidiary of the Compagnie des Messageries Maritimes. She was launched on 3 June. Her port of registry was Dunkerque, and the Code Letters OSQY were allocated. Éridan was named after the constellation Eridanus. She departed from Marseille, Bouches-du-Rhône on her maiden voyage on 3 November, bound for Alexandria, Egypt, then Jaffa and Haifa, Palestine.

== Australian service ==
On 11 January 1930, she started serving the Marseille – Australia service via the Suez Canal. One of the passengers on her first voyage to Australia were Lucy Chiang, the daughter of the Chinese Consul-General to Australia. Paul Marcus was also on board. He was travelling to Australia having been appointed the French Consul for Victoria in place of Rene Turck. Another notable passenger was Maurice Tronet, travelling to take up a position as Administrator of the New Hebrides. George Elwood Nichols was on board, returninhg to Australia having spent the past fourteen months in England engaged in research. Éridan arrived at Fremantle, Western Australia on 11 February. She departed later that day, arriving at Port Adelaide, South Australia on 16 February. A dinner was held aboard the ship the next day. Éridan arrived at Melbourne, Victoria on 19 February. She then sailed to Sydney, New South Wales, where she arrived on 22 February. In March 1930, southern France was affected by severe floods. Éridans flag was flown at half mast as a symbol of mourning.

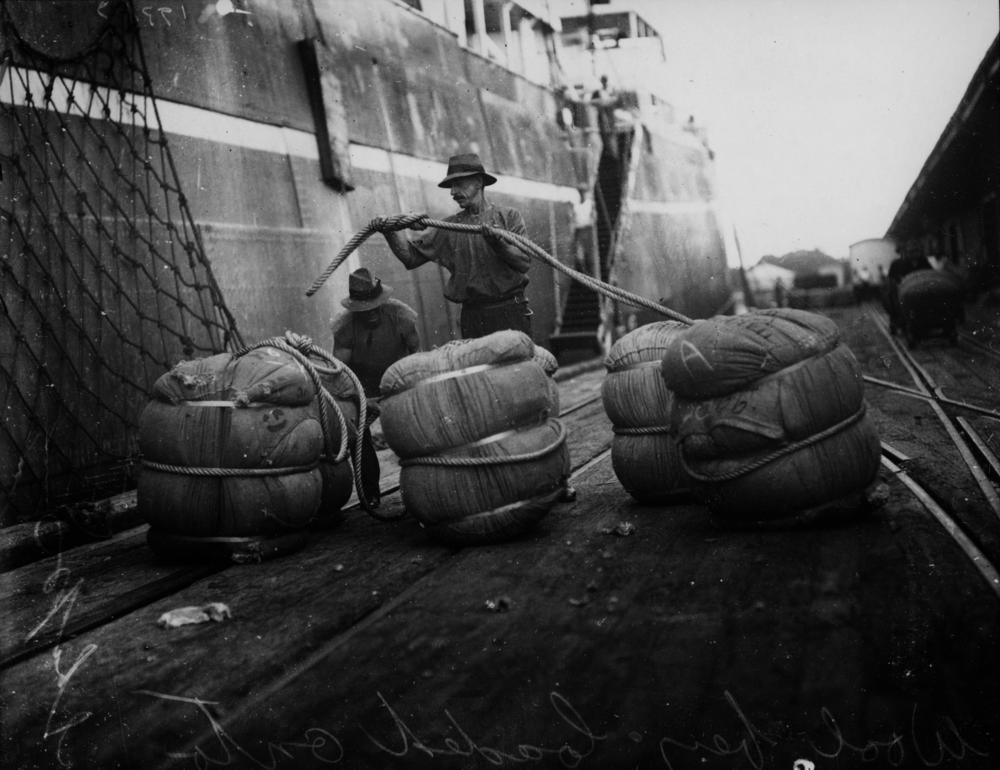
Wool being loaded onto a ship at Brisbane, c. 1931.

Éridan departed from Sydney on 13 March, bound for Marseille via Brisbane, South Australia and Sydney. She arrived at Brisbane on 17 March. A cargo of 10,000 bales of wool was loaded there. Éridan departed from Brisbane on 22 March. She arrived at Sydney on 24 March, sailing three days later. She was bound for Le Havre, Seine-Inférieure, France via Suez, Egypt, Marseille, Dunkerque and Antwerp, Belgium. Amongst her passengers was Rene Turck, who was to take up a post in Athens, Greece. She passed Perim, Aden Colony on 18 April. Éridan arrived at Suez on 21 April, and Port Said, Egypt the next day. She passed Gibraltar on 30 April, and arrived at Dunkerque on 6 May.

Éridan started her second voyage to Australia in May 1930. She departed from Lisbon, Portugal on 25 May. She arrived at Marseille on 30 May, sailing two days later. She arrived at, and departed from, Port Said on 7 June. Passing Perim on 12 June, Éridan arrived at, and departed from, Fremantle on 30 June. She arrived at Adelaide on 5 July, departing for Melbourne that day. Éridan arrived at Melbourne on 7 July. She then sailed to Sydney, arriving two days later. Amongst the 35 passengers on board were twenty French Navy sailors who were travelling to Nouméa to join the Arabis-class sloop Bellatrix. During her stay in Sydney, Éridan was given an overhaul.

Éridan sailed on 12 July bound for Le Havre via Brisbane, Port Said, Marseille, Dunkerque and Antwerp. The motor launch Kernell was caught in the wash from Éridan off Jones Bay Wharf and was driven into a punt. Kernell was holed above the waterline; timber was obtained from a lighter and she was ballasted to keep the hole from shipping water. Éridan arrived at Brisbane on 14 July, dressed to celebrate Bastille Day. A search of the ship on 20–21 July by Customs officers revealed a revolver and cartridges, and 1,280 cigarettes, which were confiscated. A sailor was intercepted leaving the ship with a box of perfume, which was also confiscated. Éridan departed from Brisbane on 27 July. She arrived at Port Said on 24 August and departed that day, arriving at Marseille on 29 August. She passed Gibraltar on 1 September, and arrived at Dunkerque on 4 September. and was expected to arrive at Dunkerque on 5 September.

Éridan began her third voyage to Australia in November 1930. She was reported passing Gibraltar on 22 November. She arrived at Marseille on 27 November, departing for Fremantle on 1 December. She was at Port Said on 7 December. Éridan arrived in Fremamtle on 30 December. She then sailed for Port Adelaide, where she arrived on 5 January 1931. Éridan arrived at Melbourne on 7 January. She departed for Sydney the next day. Éridan arrvived on 10 January. Seven of her passengers were denied entry into Australia due to newly introduced restrictions on migration. Another passenger was subsequently convicted of being a prohibited immigrant. He was sentenced to six months' imprisonment and deportation.

Éridan departed from Sydney on 23 January, bound for Dunkerque via Brisbane and Sydney. She arrived at Brisbane on 26 January. A cargo of 8,000 bales of wool was loaded. She sailed on 31 January, arriving at Sydney on 3 February. Éridan sailed on 5 February. Amongst her passengers was Louis Nettement, the French Consul General to Australia. She was bound for Le Havre via Port Said, Marseille, Dunkerque and Antwerp. Éridan arrived at Suez on 2 March. On 4 March, she sailed for Marseille, where she arrived on 13 March. Éridan was reported passing Gibraltar that day, She departed from Lisbon on 14 March, and arrived at Dunkerque on 17 March.

Éridan departed from Dunkerque for her fourth voyage to Australia on 30 April, She arrived departed from Lisbon on 5 May, and arrived at Marseille on 10 May, and was scheduled to depart five days later, bound for Australia via Colombo, Ceylon. She arrived at Port Said on 20 May, departing later that day. She passed Perim on 22 May, Éridan departed from Colombo for Melbourne on 3 June. Éridan arrived at Melbourne on 19 June. On board was the artist Max Meldrum, his wife and daughters. Meldrum was returning to Australia after being away for six years. Also on board were Edouard Joubert, on his way to Auckland, New Zealand to take up his appointment as the French Consul to New Zealand, Alain de Boismenu, Vicar-Apolistic of Papua and Anton Carlotti, the new French Commissioner to the New Hebrides. She then sailed to Sydney, arriving on 22 June.

Éridan departed from Sydney on 27 June bound for Dunkerque. She arrived at Brisbane on 29 June. A search by Customs officers revealed at 1,720 cigarettes, three packets of tobacco and fourteen bottles of liqueurs and wine secreted around the ship. They were confiscated. A total of 9,263 bales of wool were loaded. They were destined for Antwerp, Dunkerque, London and Marseille. Éridan departed from Brisbane on 11 July. Two stowaways were discovered hiding in her lifeboats. They were returned to shore and charged. The stowaways pleaded guilty. As Messageries Maritimes did not press the charge, they were convicted and discharged. She passed Perim on 4 August, and arrived at Suez and then Port Said on 7 August. Éridan arrived at Marseille on 12 August. She departed from Marseille that day, and arrived at Gibraltar on 15 August. She arrived at Dunkerque on 18 August.

Éridan departed from Dunkerque on her fifth voyage to Australia on 12 October. She was bound for Sydney via Le Havre, Bordeaux, Lisbon, Marseille, Port Said, Alleppey in India, Colombo and Melbourne. She arrived at Lisbon on 16 October, departing two days later and arriving at Marseille on 22 October. Éridan departed from Marseille on 24 October. She departed from Port Said on 31 October, passing Perim on 2 November. She departed from Colombo on 14 November, arriving at Melbourne on 26 November. Amongst her passengers was Colonel Salel, the Assistant Governor to the New Hebrides. Éridan had brought the body of Mrs. Butler to Melbourne. Mrs. Butler had died in Marseille on 10 October whilst returning to Australia. She was buried in Brighton Cemetery, Melbourne on 27 November. She sailed for Sydney two days later, arriving on 30 November. Éridan had a ship's cat, named Siki. Amongst her passengers, was Mme Nettement, wife of the French Consul-General to Australia.

Éridan departed from Sydney on 7 December, bound for Marseille via Brisbane. She arrived at Brisbane the next day. Sailing for Sydney, where she arrived on 21 December. She sailed the next day, but not before a female passenger had managed to fall into the water. Éridan was bound for Antwerp via Port Moresby, Samarai, Port Said, Marseille and then Dunkerque, Antwerp, and Le Havre. She was reported passing Perim on 13 January 1932, and arrived at Suez on 17 January. She then sailed to Port Said, departing on 20 January. Éridan arrived at Marseille on 22 January, sailing later that day. She was reported passing Gibraltar two days later.

Éridan departed from Dunkerque on her sixth voyage to Australia on 22 March. She departed from Lisbon on 4 April. She departed from Marseille on 8 April, with French Consul General to Australia Edgar Dussap, his wife, Vice Consul General Albert Zarzecki, and his wife, on board. Éridan arrived at Port Said on 14 April. She passed Perim on 19 April, and was expected to arrive at Colombo on 25 April. She departed on 28 April, arriving at Melbourne on 13 May, and Sydney two days later.

Éridan departed from Sydney on 22 May for Brisbane. She arrived on 25 May. Amongst the cargo loaded were 12,500 bales of wool. During her stay in Brisbane, crew members of Éridan played four games of football against teams formed of Australian seamen and labourers, winning three of them. She sailed on 4 June. She arrived at Sydney on 6 June, and sailed the next day for Le Havre via Port Said, Marseille, Dunkerque and Antwerp. She passed Perim on 29 June, and arrived at Suez on 4 July. Éridan departed on 8 July, She arrived at Marseille on 10 July, sailing for Dunkerque later that day. She arrived at Antwerp on 23 July. She sailed later that day for Dunkerque.

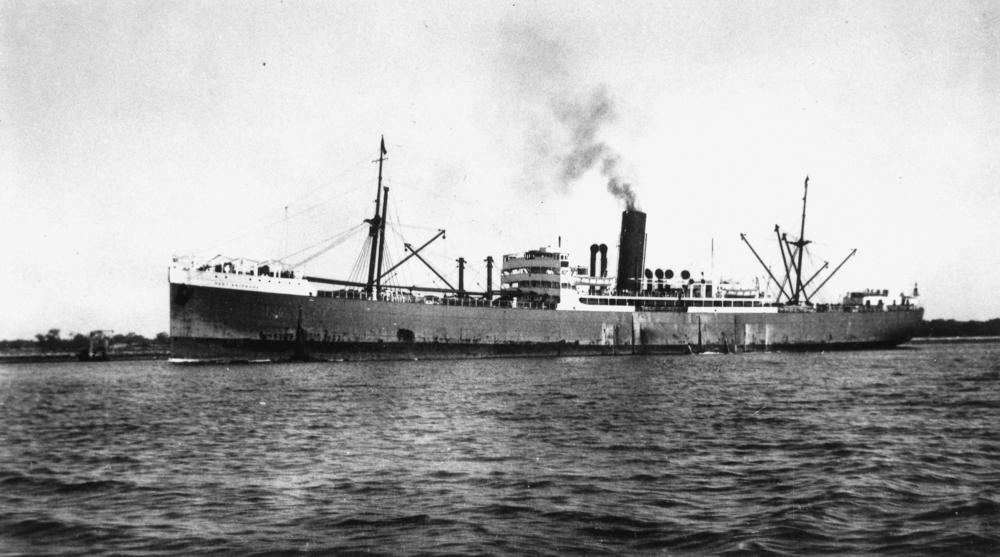
Port Brisbane, which observed Éridan in a Fata Morgana in November 1932.

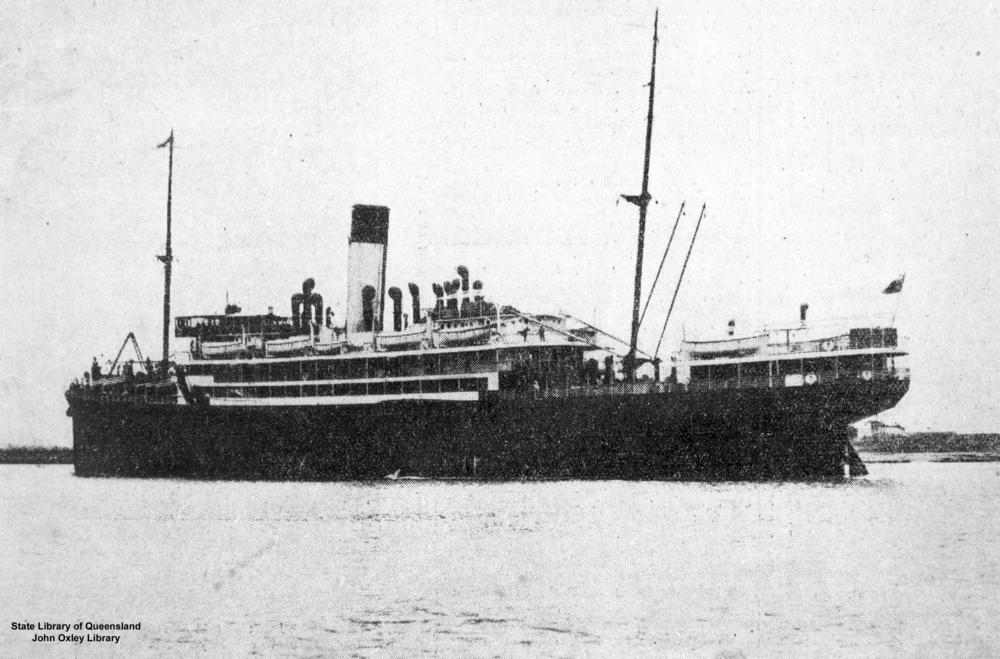
Canberra, which also observed her.

Éridan departed from Dunkerque on her seventh voyage to Australia on 4 October. She arrived at Lisbon on 16 October, departing for Marseille two days later. Passing Perim on 31 October, Éridan departed from Colombo on 9 November bound For Melbourne. She arrived at Melbourne on 24 November. On board was ethnologist Hugo Bernatzik, travelling to the Solomon Islands, and a donkey worth F30,000 (£A350) going to New Zealand for stud. She departed from Melbourne on 26 November, arriving at Sydney on 28 November. During her voyage, Éridan was observed in a Fata Morgana (a kind of mirage) off Gabo Island by sailors aboard Port Brisbane and Canberra.

Éridan departed from Sydney on 21 December, bound for Port Said, Marseille, Dunkerque, Antwerp, Le Havre and Bordeaux. She passed Perim on 12 January 1933, arriving at Suez on 14 January. Éridan arrived at Port Said on 16 January. She sailed on 20 January, arriving at Marseille on 24 January. She passed Gibraltar the next day.

The service was subsequently extended to Nouméa, New Caledonia. A cruise from Sydney to Nouméa in April and May 1933 was advertised in the Daily Commercial News and Shipping List in February 1933. Éridan departed from Dunkerque on her eighth voyage to Australia on 14 March. Departing from Lisbon on 17 March, she arrived at Marseille the next day. She departed on 20 March, arriving at Port Said on 26 March. She sailed that day. Éridan passed Perim on 31 March, and arrived at Colombo on 12 April. She arrived at Melbourne on 24 April. On board was M. Siadoux, the new French Governor of New Caledonia, with his wife and daughter. Also aboard was Henri Sautot and his wife. Sautot was travelling to the New Hebrides to take up a 3-year appointment as Commissioner there. Other passengers included photographer Carl Werntz. Éridan sailed for Sydney the next day, and arrived on 27 April. She departed for Nouméa on 29 April.

Éridan returned to Sydney on 8 May. She departed from Sydney for Brisbane on 15 May. At Brisbane, 19,328 bales of wool and 200 tons of Copra were loaded. She sailed from Brisbane on 27 May, returning to Sydney. She departed on 31 May for Le Havre via Port Said, Marseille, Dunkerque and Antwerp. Éridan passed Perim on 24 June, and arrived at Suez four days later. She then sailed to Port Said, departing on 30 June. She arrived at Marseille on 5 July. Éridan passed Gibraltar on 9 July, and arrived at Dunkerque on 14 July.

Éridan departed from Dunkerque on her ninth voyage to Australia on 22 August. She was reported passing Gibraltar on 29 August. She departed from Marseille on 3 September, arriving at Port Said on 12 September. Éridan passed Perim on 17 September. She departed from Colombo on 26 September, arriving at Melbourne on 12 October. She sailed the next day, and arrived at Sydney on 15 October.

Éridan departed from Sydney for Brisbane on 23 October. She was bound for Le Havre via Sydney and Marseille. She arrived on 25 October. During her stay in Brisbane, Éridan was visited by George Lambley, a 69-year-old farmer from Pratten. Lambley was making his first ever visit to Brisbane. On seeing the ship, he commented "By Cripes! Is that a boat? I thought it was a building!". She sailed from Brisbane for Sydney on 4 November, arriving three days later. She sailed on 8 November for Le Havre via Port Said, Marseille, Dunkerque and Antwerp. One of her passengers was James McCall, who was being deported to the United Kingdom after serving thirteen years in prison for attempted murder. His deportation was on condition that he never returned to Australia. Éridan arrived at Suez on 5 December. She departed three days later, and arrived at Marseille on 12 December. She passed Gibraltar on 14 December, and arrived at Dunkerque on 21 December.

In 1934, her Code Letters were changed to FOAU. Éridan was scheduled to depart on her tenth voyage to Australia on 22 January. She passed Gibraltar on 25 January, and subsequently arrived at Marseille, from where she departed on 2 February. She passed Perim on 12 February, and later arrived at Colombo. She departed on 22 February, arriving at Melbourne on 9 March. She sailed for Sydney the next day, and arrived on 12 March.

Éridan departed from Sydney on 17 March for Le Havre via Brisbane, Sydney, Melbourne, Marseille and Bordeaux. She arrived at Brisbane on 20 March. Having loaded 6,953 bales of wool, she departed on 24 March. Éridan arrived back at Sydney on 26 March and departed later that day, a passenger short of the intended number. She arrived at Melbourne two days later, She sailed on 29 March, and passed Perim on 18 April. She arrived at Suez on 24 April. At the entrance to the Red Sea, Éridan assisted the 80 crew of two Arab fishing boats, which had broken down, had lost their charts and were short of water. She sailed to Port Said, from where she departed on 25 April for Dunkerque. She arrived at Marseille on 2 May, and was reported passing Gibraltar on 4 May, and arrived at Dunkerque on 7 May.

On her eleventh voyage to Australia, Éridan departed from Marseille on 13 July. She arrived at Port Said on 18 July. She passed Perim on 23 July. Éridan departed from Colombo on 2 August, and arrived at Melbourne on 17 August. She then sailed for Sydney, arriving on 20 August.

Éridan departed from Sydney for Brisbane on 25 July. She arrived at Brisbane two days later. Having loaded 4,880 bales of wool, she departed on 8 September. Éridan arrived back at Sydney on 10 September, Whilst being loaded with a cargo of wheat on 13 September, an accident occurred in which a bag of wheat was dropped onto a man in the ship's hold, breaking his neck. She departed from Sydney on 13 September bound for Le Havre via Port Said, Marseille, Dunkerque and Antwerp. She passed Perim on 7 October, departing from Port Said on 13 October. Éridan arrived at Dunkerque on 27 October.

Éridan started her twelfth voyage to Australia late in December. She was reported passing Gibraltar on 2 January 1935. She departed from Marseille on 7 January, bound for Melbourne, Sydney and Nouméa. She passed Perim on 17 January, and sailed from Colombo on 26 January. She arrived at Melbourne on 11 February, sailing the next day for Sydney. Éridan arrived on 14 January. She sailed on 19 February for Nouméa, Port Vila, New Hebrides, and Brisbane.

Éridan departed from Nouméa on 1 March. She arrived at Brisbane on 4 March. About 12,000 bales of wool were loaded. She sailed on 16 March, but returned after a stowaway was discovered on board. He was transferred to Captain Cook and was taken into custody, but was subsequently released without charge. Éridan was delayed by an hour and a half. She passed Perim on 12 April, and arrived at Suez four days later. She sailed on 20 April, and arrived at Marseille on 24 April. Éridan passed Gibraltar on 26 April, arriving at Antwerp on 8 May. She sailed for Dunkerque that day.

Éridan departed from Dunkerque on her thirteenth voyage to Australia on 30 July. She arrived at Marseille on 7 August, departing two days later for Fremantle, Adelaide, Melbourne, Sydney and Brisbane. She arrived at Port Said on 14 August, sailing that day. She passed Perim on 19 August, and arrived at Melbourne on 13 September. She sailed the next day, and arrived at Sydney on 16 September. She arrived at Brisbane on 21 September.

Éridan departed from Brisbane for Le Havre on 28 September. She arrived at Sydney on 30 September, She sailed on 2 October bound for Le Havre via Melbourne, Port Said, Marseille, Dunkerque and Antwerp. Éridan arrived at Melbourne on 4 October; she sailed four days later. Éridan passed Perim on 30 October, and subsequently departed from Port Said on 7 November. She subsequently arrived at Marseille.

== Nouméa service ==
In late 1935, her route was altered to Marseille – Nouméa and Papeete, French Polynesia via the Panama Canal. This was due to the French Government withdrawing in November a subsidy paid to Messageries Maritimes. Éridan was reported to have departed from Marseille on 4 December bound for Nouméa via the Panama Canal. She passed Gibraltar on 8 December, and was due at Nouméa on 23 January 1936. She arrived at Suva, Fiji Islands on 19 January. Éridan departed from Nouméa on 1 February, bound for Marseille via Papeete, Port Vila, Cristóbal, Panama and Point-à-Pitre, Guadeloupe. She departed from Point-à-Pitre on 11 March.

Éridan made another voyage to Nouméa, departing from Marseille in April 1936. She arrived at Suva on 30 May, departing for Nouméa the next day. Sailing from Nouméa in June, she arrived at Papeete on 1 July. Éridan departed from Marseille on 24 August bound for Nouméa. She arrived at Suva on 5 October, sailing later that day. She arrived at Nouméa on 9 October. Éridan departed from Nouméa on 18 October. She was bound for Marseille via Port Vila, Raiatea, Society Islands, Papeete, Cristóbal, Fort de France, Haiti, and Point-à-Pitre. She arrived at Marseille on 9 December.

Éridan's movements in 1937 are not well documented. She was reported to have departed from Algiers, Algeria on 6 July for Australia. She arrived at Nouméa in early August. On board were two Albanian refugees, bound for Australia, which they reached on board La France. She arrived at Suva from Papeete on 10 August, sailing the next day for Port Vila.

Departing from Marseille, Éridan arrived at Algiers on 2 December. she was reported passing Gibraltar on 4 December. She departed from Fort de France for Australia on 17 December. She arrived at Cristóbal on 19 December. She arrived as Suva on 10 January 1938, departing later that day for Nouméa. Having sailed from Marseille, she was reported departing from Madeira, Portugal on 11 March. She arrived at Suva on 16 May. One of her crew was caught smuggling opium. He was fined £150, or six months' imprisonment. She departed from Suva for Nouméa the next day. On the return voyage, she arrived at Balboa, Panama on 28 June.

Éridan arrived at Suva from Marseille on 31 October. On board were 69 Austrian, Czech and German refugees. They subsequently reached Australia on board Pierre Loti. Éridan sailed for Nouméa the next day.

Éridan departed from Marseille on 6 March 1939. Amongst her passengers was Henri Sautot, on his way to the New Hebrides to take up a position as Commissioner. He would later be the first diplomat to declare for Free France. Also on board, were a group of Marines travelling to join the Bougainville-class aviso Dumont d'Urville and a group of soldiers travelling to join the garrison at Nouméa. On 8 March, she collided with Empress of Australia at Algiers. She was reported as arriving at Suva from Papeete on 18 April, departing the next day for Port Vila.

== World War II ==
Éridan departed from Algiers on 26 August 1939 bound for Australia. On 10 November, she ran aground at Port of Spain, Trinidad and was severely damaged.

In 1940, Éridan came under Vichy French control. She was used on the Marseille - Madagascar - Saigon, French Indo-China route. In May, she was damaged in an arson attack. She was reported as departing from Saigon on 10 April 1941. between 14 and 18 May, Éridan was escorted from Tamatave, Madagascar to a position off Durban, Southa Africa by the submarine Vengeur. She departed from Casablanca, Morocco on 4 November 1941 and arrived at Oran, Algeria three days later.

Éridan was captured off the North African coast in November 1942 by forces taking part in Operation Torch, assisted by French Resistance personnel on board. She was taken in to Arzew, Algeria and then moved to Oran. She was placed under the British Ministry of War Transport, operating under the management of the British India Steam Navigation Company. A French crew operated the ship. She joined the Inter-Allied Shipping Pool.

Éridan was a member of Convoy MKS 6, which departed from the Philippeville, Algeria on 19 January 1943 and arrived at Liverpool, Lancashire, United Kingdom on 1 February. She arrived at the Clyde on 31 January. She departed on 22 March to join Convoy WN 406, which departed from Loch Ewe that day and arrived at Methil, Fife on 24 March. She then joined Convoy FS 1073, which departed on 26 March and arrived at Southend, Essex on 28 March. during the next seven months, she was converted to a troopship. She could accommodate 182 officers and 2,132 soldiers. Éridan was a member of Convoy FN 1148, which departed from Southend on 12 October and arrived at Methil two days later. She then joined Convoy EN 294A, which departed on 15 October and arrived at Loch Ewe two days later. She subsequently joined convoy KMS 30G, which departed from Liverpool on 17 October and arrived at Gibraltar on 30 October. Her destination was Algiers, which was reached as a member of Convoy KMS 30, which departed from Gibraltar on 31 October and arrived at Port Said on 11 November. She arrived on 3 November, departing under escort the next day and arriving at Philippeville on 5 November. Éridan departed on 13 November to join Convoy KMS 31, which had departed from Gibraltar on 10 November and arrived at Port Said on 21 November. She left the convoy and put in to Augusta, Sicily, Italy, on 15 November. Éridan departed with Convoy AH 9 on 17 November. The convoy was bound for Bari, but she put in to Taranto on 18 November. She then sailed to Bari, departing on 19 November as a member of Convoy HA 9, which arrived at Augusta on 21 November. She sailed on 24 November, to join Convoy KMS 32, which had sailed from Gibraltar on 19 November and arrived at Port Said on 30 November. Her destination was Alexandria, Egypt, where she arrived on 30 November. She then sailed to Port Said, from where she departed on 3 December as a member of Convoy XIF 5, which arrived at Taranto on 9 December. Éridan sailed to Augusta. She joined Convoy XIF 5A, which sailed on 10 December and arrived at Algiers on 13 December. She departed from Algiers on 22 December to join Convoy UGS 26, which had departed from the Hampton Roads, Virginia, United States on 5 December and arrived at Port Said on 30 December. She was bound for Philippeville, arriving on 23 December.

Éridan sailed on 29 December to join Convoy NSF 11, which had departed from Oran that day and arrived at Naples, Italy on 2 January 1944. She sailed the next day with Convoy SNF 11, which arrived at Oran on 6 January. Her destination was Algiers; She arrived on 6 January. She sailed on 11 January, joining Convoy IXF 7, which had departed from Taranto on 9 January and arrived at Port Said on 17 January. On arrival, Éridan was placed under repair for ten days. She departed on 30 January with Convoy MKS 39, which arrived at Gibraltar on 11 February. She left the convoy at Malta on 5 February and was escorted to Tripoli, arriving the next day. She departed three days later under escort, arriving at Malta on 11 February. She sailed that day to join Convoy KMS 40, which had departed from Gibraltar on 7 February and arrived a Port Said on 18 February. She departed on 23 February, arriving at Alexandria the next day. Éridan sailed on 6 March to join Convoy GUS 33, which had departed from Port Said on 5 March and arrived at the Hampton Roads on 4 April. She left the convoy on 11 March, arriving at Malta. She sailed to Tripoli and returned to Malta on 14 March, sailing the next day to join Convoy UGS34, which had departed from the Hampton Roads on 23 February and arrived at Port Said on 20 March. She departed on 25 March with Convoy GUS 35, which arrived at the Hampton Roads on 22 April. Her destination was Tripoli, where she arrived on 1 April. She was escorted to Malta the next day. Éridan sailed on 4 April to join Convoy UGS 36, which had departed from the Hampton Roads on 14 March and arrived at Port Said on 9 April. Her destination was Alexandria, where she arrived on 9 April. She sailed on 15 April to join Convoy GUS 37, which had departed from Port Said on 14 April and arrived at the Hampton Roads on 11 May. She was bound to Tripoli via Malta, which was reached on 20 April. She departed from Malta on 23 April to joing Convoy UGS 38, which had departed from the Hampton Roads on 3 April and arrived at Port Said on 28 April. She departed on 4 May with Convoy GUS 39, which arrived at the Hampton Roads on 29 May. Her destination was Tripoli via Malta, which was reached on 10 May. She was escorted to Tripoli the next day, returning to Malta on 13 May. Éridan departed from Malta under escort the next day, arriving at Port Said on 19 May. She departed on 24 May as a member of Convoy GUS 41, which arrived at the Hampton Roads on 19 June. Her destination was Tripoli, She arrived at Malta on 30 May, and was then escorted to Tripoli, arriving and departing the next day and arriving back at Malta on 1 June. She sailed the next day to join Convoy UGS 42, which had departed from the Hampton Roads on 13 May and arrived at Port Said on 8 June. Her destination was Alexandra, where she arrived on 8 June, sailing the next day to join Convoy MKS 52, which had departed from Port Said on 8 June and arrived at Gibraltar on 20 June. Her destination was Malta. She arrived on 14 June and sailed the next day to Tripoli, arriving on 16 June. She departed the next day under escort and arrived back at Malta on 18 June. She sailed the next day to join Convoy KMS 53, which had departed from Gibraltar on 14 June and arrived at Port Said on 24 June. Her destination was Alexandria, where she arrived on 23 June. Éridan departed from Alexandria on 4 July, putting in to Port Said the next day and then sailing to Aden, where she arrived on 13 July. She was the only member of Convoy AB 42C, which departed from Aden on 18 July and arrived at Bombay, India on 25 July. Having loaded 1,400 troops, she departed on 29 July with Convoy BA 76, which arrived at Aden on 6 August. She departed from Aden on 10 August, arriving at Suez on 13 August, sailing for Port Said the next day. She departed from Port Said on 15 August and arrived at Alexandri the next day. She sailed on 17 August to join Convoy MKS 65, which had departed from Port Said on 16 August and arrived at Gibraltar on 28 October. Her destination was Malta, where she arrived on 22 October. She sailed that day to Tripoli, returning to Malta on 25 October. She sailed on 31 October, arriving at Alexandria on 4 November. Éridan departed from Alexandria under escort on 6 November, arriving at Piraeus, Greece on 8 November. She departed under escort on 12 November and arrived back at Alexandria on 14 November. Three more such trips were made under escort in November and December. She departed from Alexandria on 26 December and arrived at Piraeus two days later. She departed from Piraeus on 29 December and arrived at Alexandria on 31 December.

Éridan sailed from Alexandria on 29 January 1945. She arrived at Taranto on 1 February, sailing two days later for Haifa, Palestine, where she arrived on 7 February. She sailed three days later for Taranto, arriving on 14 February and sailing the next day for Naples, where she arrived on 17 February. She sailed the next day and arrived at Marseille on 20 February. Éridan sailed from Marseille on 7 March and arrived at Taranto two daysl later. She sailed on 11 March, arriving at Piraeus two days later. She departed on 15 March for Salonika, arriving the next day, departing the day after and arriving back at Piraeus on 18 March. She sailed the next day, arriving at Taranto on 21 March. She sailed two days later and arrived at Piraeus on 25 March. Another return trip to Salonica was made before she departed of 30 March for Taranto, where she arrived on 1 April. A return trip to Piraeus was then made. She departed from Taranto on 9 April, arriving at Patras, Greece the next day. Éridan departed under escort on 11 April; she arrived at Taranto the next day. She sailed on 15 April, arriving at Patras two days later and again departing under escort that day, arriving back at Taranto on 18 April. She departed the next day on a round trip to Piraeus, arriving back on 25 April and departing the next day for Alexandria, where she arrived on 29 April. She departed on 3 May and arrived at Taranto on 8 May.

== Post-war ==
Éridan departed from Taranto on 9 May for Port Said, where she arrived on 13 May. She sailed ten days later for Taranto, arriving on 1 June and sailing that day for Suda Bay. Arriving on 2 June, she sailed two days later for Port Said, where she arrived on 6 June. She sailed four days later, arriving at Augusta on 14 June, sailing later that day for Taranto, where she arrived on 18 June. She sailed on 21 June, arriving at Alexandria three days later. Éridan sailed from Alexandria on 1 July, arriving at Port Said the next day and sailing the day after. She arrived at Taranto on 10 July. She departed two days later and arrived at Piraeus on 14 July. she departed the next day for Rhodes, arriving on 16 July and departing the next day for Taranto, which was reached on 19 July. She sailed on 24 July and arrived at Alexandria on 28 July.

On 30 December 1945, Éridan suffered an engine room fire whilst at Saigon. Repairs were estimated to take three months to complete. She was due to sail to the United Kingdom carrying 400 British troops and 700 French civilians. Éridan was returned to her French owners in March 1946, coming under the ownership of the Compagnie des Messageries Maritimes. She was used as a troopship in the Mediterranean Sea before undergoing a refit at Toulon, Var which was completed in 1947. Following the refit, she had capacity for 95 first class and 112 second class passengers, and 900 troops. Éridan was placed in service on the Marseille – Suez Canal – Madagascar, Réunion – Mauritius route. Éridan was reported to be due to depart from Marseille for Australia on 15 October 1948 with 150 Jewish refugees aboard. Routed via the Panama Canal and Tahiti, she passed Guadeloupe on 4 December, Éridan arrived at Fort-de-France, Martinique on 6 December. She arrived at Sydney on 19 January 1949, carrying 761 passengers of seventeen nationalities. Complaints were made of overcrowding, shortage of water and poor quality food. Conditions were compared to those on board hellships. Messageries Maritmes countered that the passengers had been told that the voyage would be under troopship conditions; that the ship was certified to carry up to 1,165 passengers, and that the passengers were at least partly responsible for the conditions on board. Éridan departed from Sydney on 1 February, bound for Marseille via Nouméa, Port Vila and Tahiti. She called at Nouméa on 14 February and Port Vila two days later. On 31 March, President of the Assembly of French Polynesia Joseph Quesnot died on board Éridan.

In 1951, Éridan was refitted by her builders. She now had only one funnel. She was used on the Madagascar route until 1953, then returned to the Papeete route. She arrived at Marseille on her final voyage on 28 January 1956. She was sold to scrappers in La Seyne-sur-Mer, Var in March 1956.
