= RMS Empress of China =

RMS or SS Empress of China may refer to one of these Canadian Pacific Steamship Company ocean liners:

- RMS Empress of China (1890), a 5,905 gross register tons (GRT) ship launched from Barrow, England in 1891 as one of the first three ships Canadian Pacific ordered in creating the White Empress fleet; scrapped in 1912.
- RMS Empress of India (1908), briefly named Empress of China in 1921; originally the 17,500 GRT Norddeutscher Lloyd ship SS Prinz Friedrich Wilhelm launched in 1907; renamed Empress of India; later renamed Montlaurier, Monteith, and Montnairn before being scrapped in 1929.
- RMS Empress of Australia (1919), briefly named Empress of China in 1921; originally the 21,860 GRT Hamburg-America Line ship SS Tirpitz launched in 1913; renamed Empress of Australia in 1922; scrapped in 1952.
