= Sir Michael Nairn, 1st Baronet =

Scottish industrialist

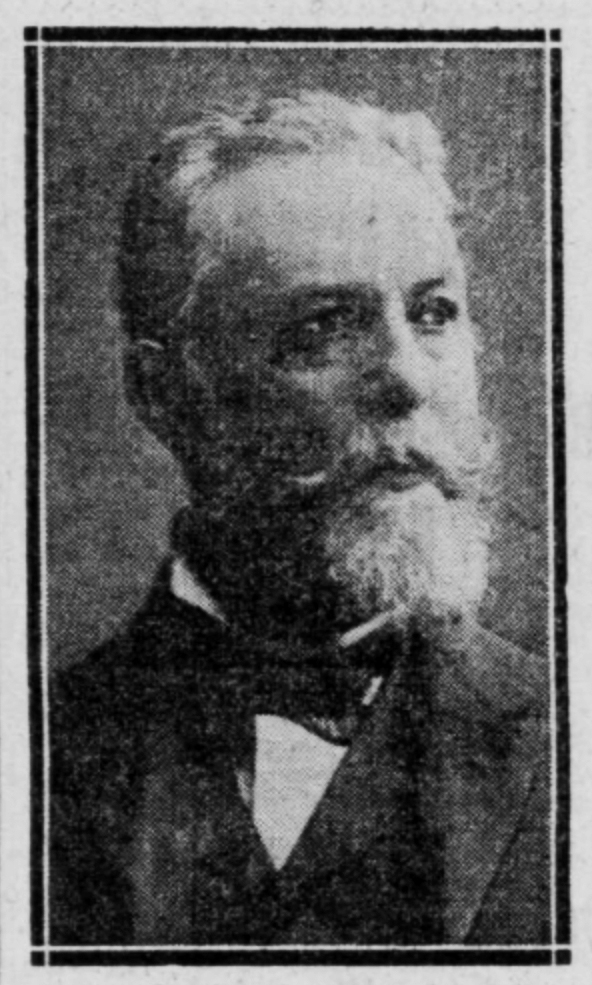
Sir Michael Barker Nairn, 1st Baronet, taken from his obituary in the Dundee Courier, in 1915.

Sir Michael Barker Nairn, 1st Baronet JP (28 May 1838 – 24 November 1915) was a Scottish industrialist, chairman of Michael Nairn and Company (linoleum manufacturers) founded by his father Michael Nairn, eventually owning seven of Kirkcaldy's linoleum factories, which employed more than 4000 people. He was involved in the civic life of Kirkcaldy, being a member of many boards, and paying for the building of the Kirkcaldy YMCA, and Kirkcaldy High School.

In 1866, he married Emily Frances, daughter of Alfred Rimington Spencer, Weybridge, Surrey. They had three sons and eight daughters.

He was created baronet in the 1904 Birthday Honours. On his death the baronetcy passed to his elder surviving son Sir Michael Nairn, 2nd Baronet, and the chairmanship of the linoleum company to John Nairn, his brother.
