= SS Prinz Friedrich Wilhelm =

Ocean liner (1907–1929)

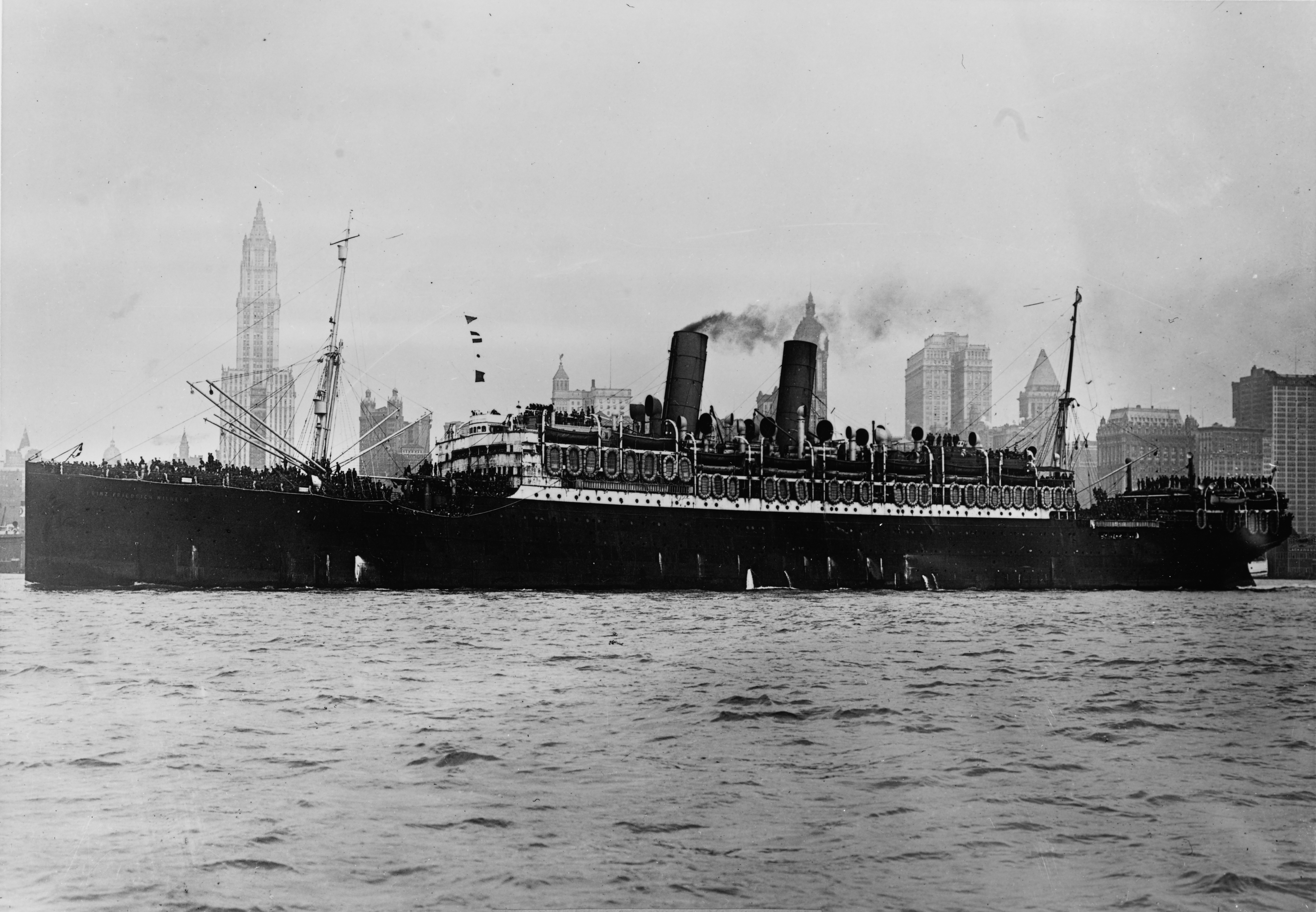
- Prinz Friedrich Wilhelm

History
- Name: 1908–1919: SS Prinz Friedrich Wilhelm; 1919: USS Prinz Friedrich Wilhelm; 1919–1921: SS Prinz Friedrich Wilhelm; 1921: SS Empress of China; 1921–1923: RMS Empress of India; 1923–1925: SS Montlaurier; 1925: SS Monteith; 1925–1929: SS Montnairn
- Owner: 1908–1919: North German Lloyd (NDL); 1919–1919: US Navy; 1919–1921: US Shipping Board; 1920–1929: Canadian Pacific Steamships
- Port of registry: 1908–1919: German Empire; 1919–1919: United States; 1920–1929: Canada
- Builder: J. C. Tecklenborg in Gestemunde, Germany
- Launched: October 21, 1907
- Maiden voyage: June 6, 1908
- Fate: Scrapped in 1929, Genoa

General characteristics
- Type: Ocean liner
- Tonnage: 16,992 gross register tons
- Length: 590.1 ft
- Beam: 68.3 ft
- Propulsion: Two masts; twin propellers
- Speed: 17 knots
- Capacity: 425 1st class passengers; 338 2nd class; up to 1,726 steerage passengers

SS Prinz Friedrich Wilhelm was an ocean liner for North German Lloyd (NDL) from her launch in 1907 until the end of World War I. After the war, she briefly served as USS Prinz Friedrich Wilhelm (ID-4063) for the United States Navy returning American troops from France. The vessel was first chartered—and later purchased outright—by Canadian Pacific Steamships (CP) and operated under the names Empress of China, Empress of India, Montlaurier, Monteith, and Montnairn. She was scrapped in 1929.

== History ==
The ship's keel was laid down to be the SS Washington, but she was renamed SS Prinz Friedrich Wilhelm before her launch. She was built in 1907–1908 for Norddeutscher Lloyd Line by Joh. C. Tecklenborg in Gestemunde, Germany. The 16,992-ton vessel had a length of 590.1 feet, and her beam was 68.3 feet. She had two funnels, two masts, propellers and a service speed of 17-knots. The ocean liner provided accommodation for 425 first-class passengers and for 338 second class passengers. There was also room for up to 1,726 third-class passengers.

=== Prinz Friedrich Wilhelm ===
The SS Prinz Friedrich Wilhelm was launched on October 21, 1907. The ship left Bremen on June 6, 1908, on her maiden voyage, stopping at Southampton, Cherbourg and New York City. She was one of several ships in the vicinity of the Titanic when the latter ship sank. Her last voyage as Prinz Frederick Wilhelm was begun on June 13, 1914. At the outbreak of war in August 1914, she cut short a pleasure cruise and sought refuge at Odda, Norway. After the war, the ship was surrendered on March 31, 1919, to the British.

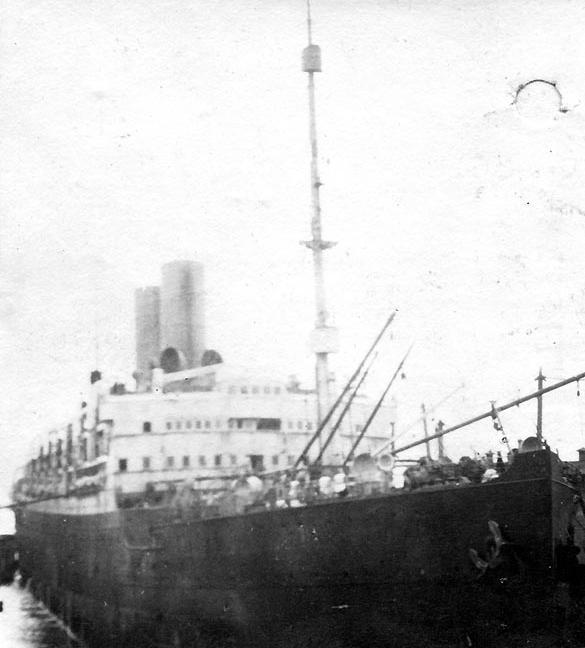
USS Prinz Friedrich Wilhelm is inspected by Third Naval District following her initial passage from European waters after the ship entered Navy service as troop transport -- NYC harbor (1919).

For a short period, she was commissioned in the US Navy as a troop transport. From April into August Prinz Friedrich Wilhelm made five trips from France and the U.S., carrying over 15,000 passengers, mainly U.S. Army personnel. She was decommissioned in November 1919 and transferred to the U.S. Shipping Board.

In 1920, she was chartered to Canadian Pacific; and she sailed between Liverpool and Quebec beginning on July 14, 1920.

=== Empress of China & Empress of India ===
On May 13, 1921, the vessel was bought outright by Canadian Pacific. She was then reconditioned at Glasgow, and rebuilt to 17, 282-tons. On August 2, 1921, she was renamed the SS Empress of China, but she never sailed with that name. This ship became the second of three CP vessels to be named Empress of China.

Within weeks, the vessel would be renamed yet again as the SS Empress of India, becoming the second of two CP vessels to be named Empress of India..

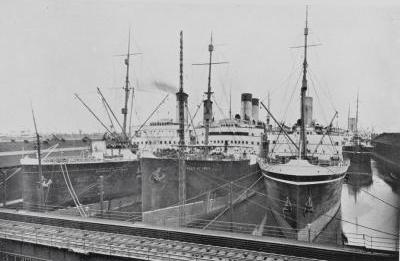
Three steamships docked together -- the SS Empress of France, the SS Empress of India, and SS Empress of Britain. Note the curved bow of the 1891 Empress of Britain in contrast with the straight-sided bows of the newer ships in the CP fleet. (1926)

On August 25, 1921, the SS Empress of India was chartered to Cunard. She completed two round-trip voyages between Southampton and New York. Then Cunard returned her to Canadian Pacific. On June 23, 1922, she set out on what would be the first of only two Liverpool-Quebec voyages. On August 21, 1922, the Empress set out for what would become her sole opportunity to sail the Southampton-Cherbourg-Quebec route.

=== Montlaurier & Monteith ===
The ship was renamed once more—this time as the SS Montlaurier. She was rebuilt to carry cabin-class and 3rd-class passengers. On May 4, 1923, she sailed from Liverpool for Quebec; but she was forced to return to England because of boiler trouble. After repairs were completed, she left port again on June 29, 1923. Her last voyage from Liverpool to Saint John, New Brunswick began on January 24, 1925. What was expected to have been a return voyage was cut short in February when she encountered steering gear trouble near Fastnet Rock off the southern coast of Ireland. The mechanical malfunction forced the ship to return to Queenstown (now known as Cobh). She was then towed to Liverpool. On April 14, 1925, she was damaged by fire as she lay in port under repair by Cammell, Laird & Co., but the fire-damage was not so extensive that she couldn't be restored.

On June 5, 1925, the ship was renamed the SS Monteith, but she never sailed under this name.

=== Montnairn ===
On July 2, 1925, the ship was again renamed—this time as the SS Montnairn. She sailed for the next few months between Liverpool and Quebec. In July 1926, she was converted to cabin-class, tourist-class and 3rd-class accommodations. On May 4, 1927, she began sailing the Antwerp - Southampton - Quebec route. On 16/9/1928 she commenced her final sailing from Hamburg to Southampton, Cherbourg and Quebec.

This ship was laid up at Southampton, having successfully completed 62 round-trip North Atlantic voyages as a CP-flagged ocean liner. On December 23, 1929, SS Montnairn was sold for the last time, and the vessel was scrapped at Genoa.
