= Sir William Boulton, 1st Baronet =

British Conservative politician (1873–1949)

Boulton in 1937.

Sir William Whytehead Boulton, 1st Baronet DL (10 January 1873 – 9 January 1949) was a British soldier and Conservative Party politician.

== Background ==
Boulton was the son of William Whytehead Boulton and his wife Mary Hudleston Gibson, daughter of John Gibson. He was privately educated.

== Career ==
Boulton served as lieutenant in the Royal Horse Guards and became a major in the 7th Volunteer Battalion, Essex Regiment. He entered the House of Commons in 1931, sitting as a Member of Parliament (MP) for Sheffield Central until 1945. Boulton was appointed a Lord Commissioner of the Treasury in 1940, a post he held for two years. He subsequently was a Government Whip as Vice-Chamberlain of the Household until 1944. On 30 June, he was created a baronet, of Braxted Park in the County of Essex. Boulton represented Essex as a Deputy Lieutenant.

== Family ==
On 23 April 1903, he married Rosalind Mary Milburn, daughter of Sir John Milburn, 1st Baronet. They had four sons. Boulton died in 1949, aged 75, and was succeeded in the baronetcy successively by his eldest son Edward and then by his third son William.

Parliament of the United Kingdom
| Preceded by Philip Hoffman | Member of Parliament for Sheffield Central; 1931 – 1945 | Succeeded by Harry Morris |
Political offices
| Preceded by James Edmondson | Vice-Chamberlain of the Household; 1942–1944 | Succeeded by Arthur Young |
Baronetage of the United Kingdom
| New creation | Baronet (of Braxted Park); 1944–1949 | Succeeded by Edward Boulton |
