= Braxted Park =

Country House in Britain

Coordinates: 51.8060°N 0.6891°E

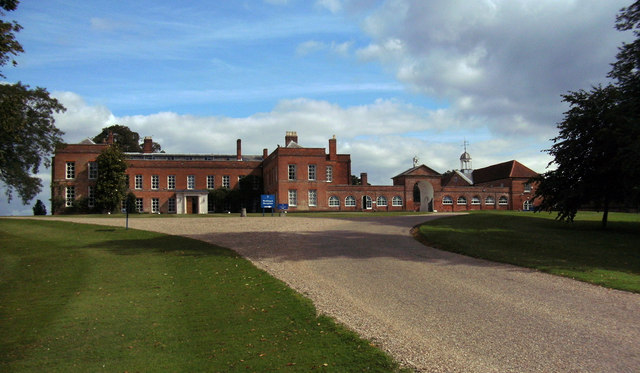
Braxted Park Estate

Braxted Park, formerly called Braxted Lodge, is a country house in the Queen Anne style set in a landscaped 2,000 acre park near the village of Great Braxted, Essex. In the Domesday Book of 1086, Eudo Dapifer is shown as owner of the manor. All Saints' Church, originally built in about 1115 and restored in the 18th century, also lies within the park grounds.

The property, recorded as a 'deer park' in 1342, was held by a series of Essex families including those by the names of Anesty, Montchensy, Valence, Hastings, Grey, Montgomery, Ayloff and Maynard.

The lands were purchased by Thomas Darcy in 1650 from the estate of the then Countess of Pembroke. Braxted Lodge was built on the property in 1680 by Darcy's son. During his ownership, the property was enlarged and landscaped, with several large man-made ponds being added, including one that is now visible from the main house and is referred to as 'the lake'.

In 1745, the estate was purchased from the Darcy family by Peter Du Cane, Sr. of nearby Coggeshall, a wealthy cloth merchant, trader and businessman descended from noble Huguenot ancestors by the name of 'Du Quesne'. Having moved the family to Essex, where he had become High Sheriff and Member of Parliament for Colchester, Du Cane ultimately settled the family at Braxted Park in 1751.

Du Cane, a director of the Bank of England and the East India Company, reconstructed and enlarged the house around 1760, assisted by Isaac Ware, Thomas James and Robert Taylor (architect). Du Cane thoroughly landscaped and upgraded the property, more than doubling its size.

The property passed to Peter Du Cane (II), then 62, when his father died at the age of 90 in 1803. He accomplished even more improvements and alterations to the building and grounds, bringing the main house and gardens largely to their present state. Peter Du Cane (III) inherited the property in 1823 and continued to add to the holdings, including the restoration of the church (including the building of the Du Cane Family crypt) and the addition of several other buildings.

In 1841, Charles Du Cane acceded to the property on the death of his cousin Peter, who had by then already formally changed its name to 'Braxted Park'. Member of Parliament for Maldon from 1852 to 1854 and for Essex North from 1857 to 1868, Du Cane served as civil Lord of the Admiralty for two years. Sir Charles was appointed Governor of Tasmania from 1868 to 1874 and died on the estate in 1889. Upon his death, his son Charles Henry Copley Du Cane resided at the hall.

Braxted Park was acquired by Sir William Boulton, 1st Baronet, from the Du Cane family in 1919. The Boulton Baronetcy of Braxted Park was created in 1944. The Boulton family sold the estate to The Plessey Company in 1947. Sir Allen George Clark, chairman of the company, and his descendants have been its occupants to the present day.

At present there is a disused Victorian school on the Estate. This was built for the use of the children of the Parish.
