= Boulton baronets =

Set index for Boulton baronets

There have been two baronetcies created for persons with the surname Boulton, both in the Baronetage of the United Kingdom.

- Boulton baronets of Copped Hall (1905)
- Boulton baronets of Braxted Park (1944)
