= Lord Alfred Spencer-Churchill =

British Conservative politician

Lord Alfred Spencer-Churchill DL JP

Member of Parliament for Woodstock
- In office 1857–1865
- Preceded by: The Marquess of Blandford
- Succeeded by: Henry Barnett
- In office 1845–1847
- Preceded by: The Viscount Loftus
- Succeeded by: The Marquess of Blandford

Personal details
- Born: Alfred Spencer-Churchill; 24 April 1824 Garboldisham Hall, Norfolk
- Died: 21 September 1893 (aged 69) Rutland Gate, London
- Party: Conservative
- Spouse: Hon. Harriet Louisa Hester Gough-Calthorpe (m. 1857)
- Relations: Edward FitzClarence, 6th Earl of Munster (grandson)
- Children: 4
- Parent(s): George Spencer-Churchill, 6th Duke of Marlborough; Lady Jane Stewart

Military service
- Branch/service: Oxfordshire Yeomanry
- Rank: Lieutenant colonel

Lord Alfred Spencer-Churchill DL JP (24 April 1824 – 21 September 1893) was a British Conservative politician.

== Early life ==
Spencer-Churchill was born on 24 April 1824 at Garboldisham Hall, in Norfolk, England. He was the son of George Spencer-Churchill, 6th Duke of Marlborough and Lady Jane Stewart, who were first cousins. Among his brothers were John Spencer-Churchill, 7th Duke of Marlborough and Lord Alan Spencer-Churchill.

His paternal grandparents were George Spencer-Churchill, 5th Duke of Marlborough and the former Lady Susan Stewart (the second daughter of John Stewart, 7th Earl of Galloway). His maternal grandparents were George Stewart, 8th Earl of Galloway and Lady Jane Paget (the second daughter of Henry Paget, 1st Earl of Uxbridge).

== Career ==
Lord Alfred was commissioned into the 4th Light Dragoons on 1 July 1842, transferred as a lieutenant to the 83rd Foot in April 1847, and retired in April the following year. On 21 October 1848 he was appointed adjutant of the Queen's Own Oxfordshire Yeomanry, commanded by his father. He was promoted to major in 1857 and lieutenant colonel in 1860.

He served as the member of parliament for Woodstock between 1845 and 1847, and again from 1857 to 1865. He also served as a justice of the peace and deputy lieutenant for Oxfordshire.

== Personal life ==
He married Hon. Harriet Louisa Hester Gough-Calthorpe, the third daughter of Frederick Gough, 4th Baron Calthorpe and Lady Charlotte Sophia Somerset (eldest daughter of Henry Somerset, 6th Duke of Beaufort), on 5 February 1857. Together they had four children, including:

- Jane Spencer-Churchill (1858–1940), who married Sir Francis Winnington, 5th Baronet, a son of Sir Thomas Winnington, 4th Baronet MP.
- Olivia Spencer-Churchill (1859–1943), writer, who married Brig.-Gen. Arthur Edward William Colville, a son of Sir William James Colville.
- Adeline Spencer-Churchill (1860–1937), who married Col. William Williams, a son of Gen. Sir John William Collman Williams.
- Violet Spencer-Churchill (1864–1941), who married Brig.-Gen. Charles FitzClarence, a grandson of The 1st Earl of Munster (an illegitimate son of William, Duke of Clarence, later King William IV).

Lord Alfred died on 21 September 1893 at Rutland Gate, his London residence. His marked grave is sited at St Mary's Church, Stanford-on-Teme, Worcestershire. His widow died on 20 July 1901.

Parliament of the United Kingdom
Preceded by The Viscount Loftus	Member of Parliament for Woodstock; 1845–1847	Succeeded by The Marquess of Blandford
Preceded by The Marquess of Blandford	Member of Parliament for Woodstock; 1857–1865	Succeeded by Henry Barnett
