= Lord Alan Spencer-Churchill =

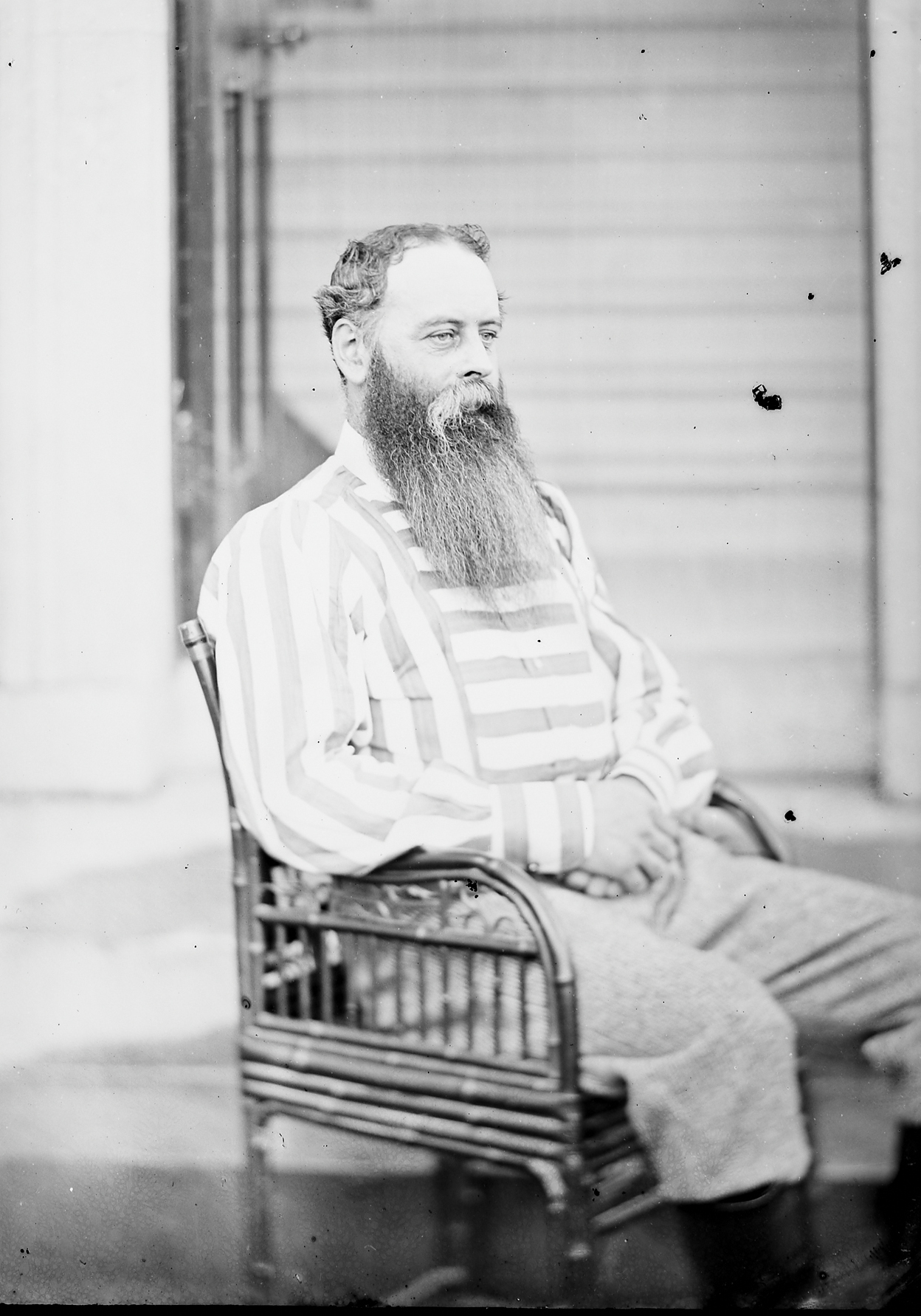
Spencer-Churchill in 1866

Lord Alan Spencer-Churchill DL (25 July 1825 – 19 April 1873) was a British aristocrat, officer in the British Army, deputy lieutenant of Oxfordshire, a lieutenant in the Oxfordshire Yeomanry and a businessman. He was a great uncle of Sir Winston Churchill.

== Family ==
Alan Spencer-Churchill was born in Garboldisham, Norfolk, the third son of the three-times-married George Spencer-Churchill, 6th Duke of Marlborough, and his first wife, Lady Jane Stewart, daughter of George Stewart, 8th Earl of Galloway. After Eton he served as an officer in the cavalry regiment of the 8th King's Royal Irish Hussars, becoming a lieutenant by purchase in 1844.

In 1843, Lord Alan was best man at the wedding of his eldest brother, John, then Marquess of Blandford, to Lady Frances Vane, the future grandparents of Prime Minister Winston Churchill.

While stationed at York with his regiment in 1846, he met and married Rosalind Dowker (sometimes referred to as 'Rosamond'), daughter of Thomas Dowker of Huntington, York. They had no surviving children.

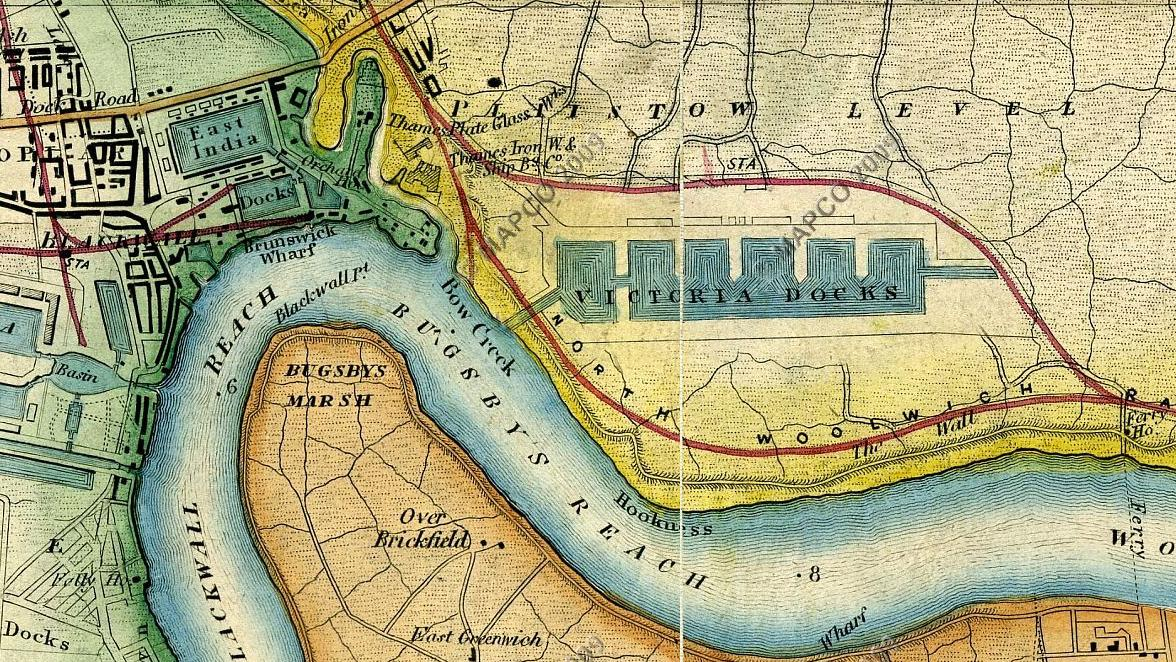
Victoria Docks 1872, showing the Thames Ironworks

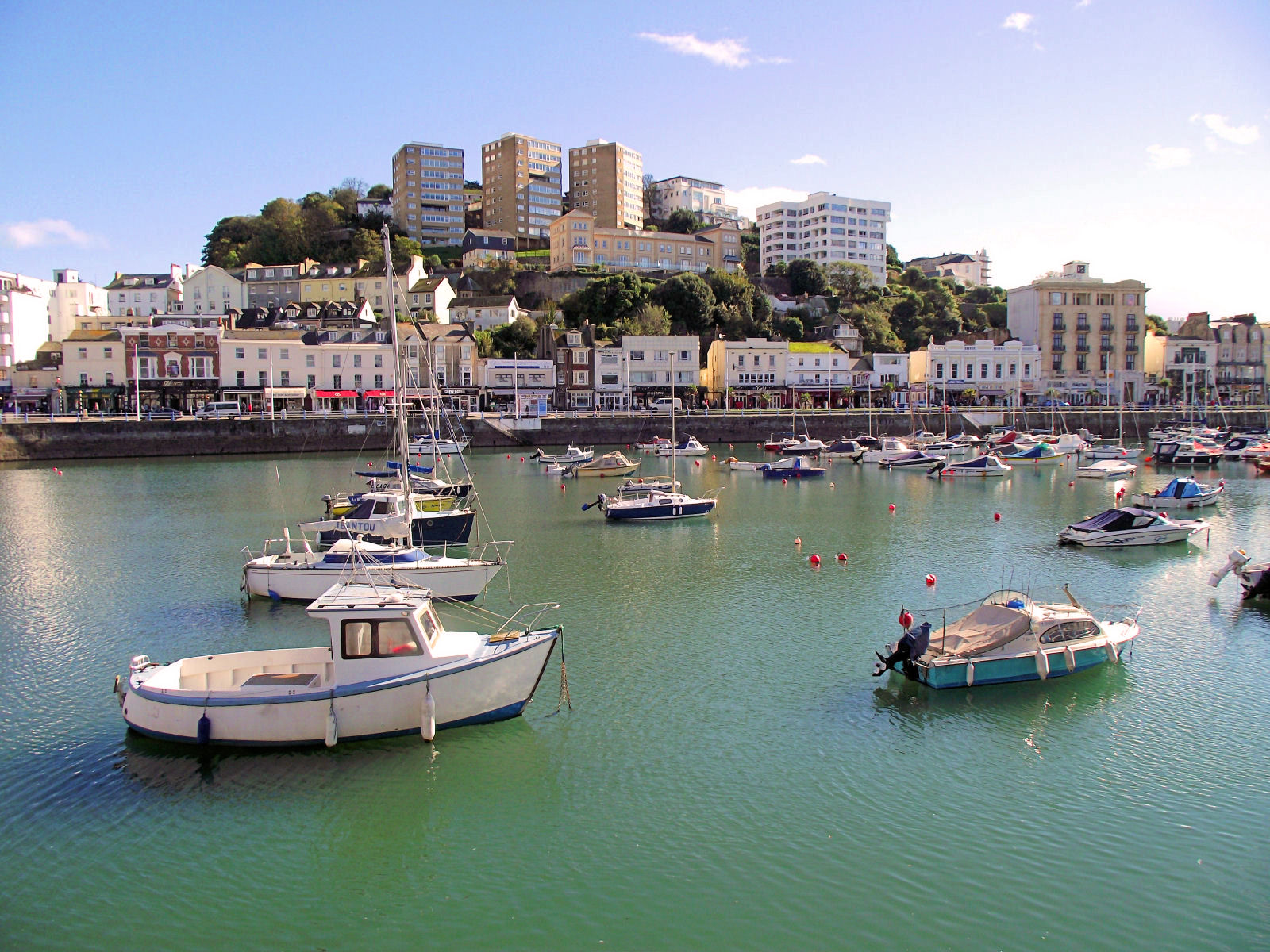
Torquay harbour with the Imperial Hotel on the hill

== Business interests ==
Unlike his two elder brothers, upon leaving the Army, Lord Alan eschewed a political career and chose instead, unusually for people of his class, to go into business. His association with Peter Rolt (1798-1882), merchant and Conservative MP for Greenwich, led to his involvement in international trade and to a number of company directorships, in the then burgeoning sectors of shipping and tourism. Among his interests were the importation of beef from Argentina as well as shipbuilding at the Thames Ironworks and Shipbuilding Company, and the establishment of freight transport networks, for example, through the British and South American Steam Navigation Company. He entered tourism through the hotel venture that was the new Imperial Hotel at Torquay.

== Country pursuits ==
As was the convention for people of his class at that time, he divided his life between business and clubs in London and the pursuits of a country squire. In August 1852 he was appointed Deputy Lieutenant of the County of Oxfordshire, the location of the family seat at Blenheim Palace, which passed to his eldest brother, John Spencer-Churchill, 7th Duke of Marlborough. Alan Spencer-Churchill was for many years patron of the Chelsea Relief Society, founded in 1861.

He died suddenly at his home in Lowndes Square, London, aged 47 years, and was buried at Brompton Cemetery.
