= Jane Spencer-Churchill, Duchess of Marlborough (1798–1844) =

British duchess (1798–1844)

Jane Spencer-Churchill, Duchess of Marlborough (29 March 1798 – 12 October 1844), formerly Lady Jane Stewart, was the first wife of George Spencer-Churchill, 6th Duke of Marlborough.

Jane was the daughter of George Stewart, 8th Earl of Galloway, and his wife, the former Lady Jane Paget, and was the first cousin of George Spencer-Churchill, whose mother had been Jane's father's sister.

She married the duke, then Marquess of Blandford, on 13 January 1819. It was the future duke's first legal marriage, though he had previously gone through a false marriage ceremony (with his brother, Lord Charles Spencer-Churchill, playing the role of clergyman) and had then lived as husband and wife in Scotland with the 16-year-old Susannah Adelaide Law, which might have made the marriage legal under Scottish law. Blandford had successfully contested the matter in court, even though she had a child by him. His mother was obliged to pay Susannah an allowance in order to prevent her making public his letters. He had also had an affair with Elizabeth Conyngham, Marchioness Conyngham.

They had four children:

- Lady Louisa Spencer-Churchill (c.1820–1882), who married the Honourable Robert Spencer, son of Francis Spencer, 1st Baron Churchill, and had issue.
- John Winston Spencer-Churchill, 7th Duke of Marlborough (1822–1883).
- Lord Alfred Spencer-Churchill (1824–1893), who married the Hon. Harriet Gough-Calthorpe, daughter of Frederick Gough, 4th Baron Calthorpe and had issue.
- Lord Alan Spencer-Churchill (1825–1873), who married Rosalind Dowker.

Blandford inherited his father's dukedom in 1840.

The duchess died at Blenheim Palace, aged 46. The duke remarried a further twice, with more children from each marriage.
