= Thrigby =

Village in Norfolk, England

Coordinates: 52.652575°N 1.6359798°E

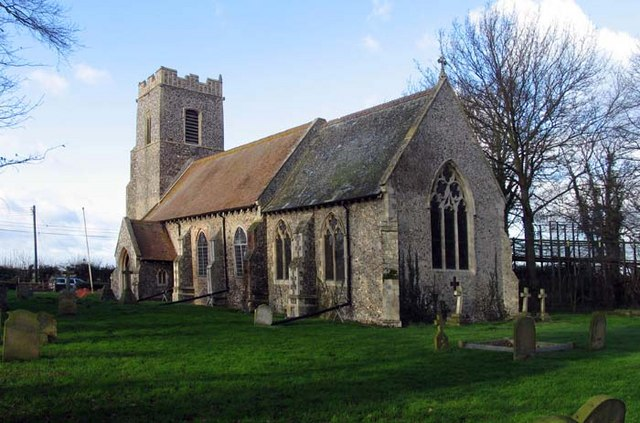

- Location within Norfolk
- Civil parish: Mautby
- District: Great Yarmouth
- Shire county: Norfolk
- Region: East
- Country: England
- Sovereign state: United Kingdom
- Post town: GREAT YARMOUTH
- Postcode district: NR29
- Dialling code: 01493
- Police: Norfolk
- Fire: Norfolk
- Ambulance: East of England
- UK Parliament: Great Yarmouth

Thrigby is a village and former civil parish 14 miles (23 km) east of Norwich, now in the parish of Mautby, in the Great Yarmouth district, in the county of Norfolk, England. In 1931 the parish had a population of 47.

== Amenities ==
It has a church called St Mary. Thrigby Hall Wildlife Gardens are on Filby Road. Thrigby Windmill is 1 mile east of the village.

== History ==
The name "Thrigby" is Old Scandinavian and means 'Thrykki's farm/settlement'. Thrigby was recorded in the Domesday Book of 1086 as Trikebei/Trukebei. On 1 April 1935 the parish was abolished and merged with Mautby.
