= George Spencer-Churchill, 6th Duke of Marlborough =

British politician

His Grace The Duke of Marlborough
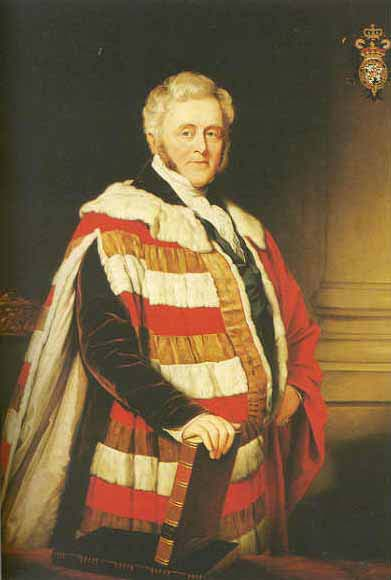

Lord-Lieutenant of Oxfordshire
- In office 1842 – 1 July 1857
- Monarch: Queen Victoria
- Preceded by: The Earl of Macclesfield
- Succeeded by: The Duke of Marlborough

Personal details
- Born: 27 December 1793 Bill Hill, Hurst, Berkshire
- Died: 1 July 1857 (aged 63) Blenheim Palace, Woodstock, Oxfordshire
- Party: Ultra-Tory
- Spouses: Lady Jane Stewart; Charlotte Flower; Jane Frances Clinton Stewart
- Children: Susan Cuénod; Lady Louisa Spencer-Churchill; John Spencer-Churchill, 7th Duke of Marlborough; Lord Alfred Spencer-Churchill; Lord Alan Spencer-Churchill; Lord Almeric Spencer-Churchill; Clementina Pratt, Marchioness Camden; Lord Edward Spencer-Churchill
- Parents: George Spencer-Churchill, 5th Duke of Marlborough; Lady Susan Stewart
- Education: Christ Church, Oxford

George Spencer-Churchill, 6th Duke of Marlborough (né Spencer; 27 December 1793 – 1 July 1857), styled Earl of Sunderland until 1817 and Marquess of Blandford between 1817 and 1840, was a British nobleman, politician, and peer. The great-grandfather of Sir Winston Churchill, he served as Lord-Lieutenant of Oxfordshire between 1842 and 1857.

== Background and education ==
Styled Earl of Sunderland from birth, he was born at Bill Hill, Hurst, Berkshire (an estate his father was renting at the time), the eldest son of George Spencer, Marquess of Blandford (later George Spencer-Churchill, 5th Duke of Marlborough) and his wife, the former Lady Susan Stewart, daughter of John Stewart, 7th Earl of Galloway. He was educated at Eton between 1805 and 1811, and later at Christ Church, Oxford. He was also given an honorary Doctorate of Civil Laws by Oxford University on 15 June 1841.

== Political career ==
He became known by the courtesy title Marquess of Blandford in 1817, when his father succeeded to the dukedom. He sat as a Tory Member of Parliament for Chippenham between 1818 and 1820; and for Woodstock from 1826 to 1831, from 1832 to 1835 and from 1838 to 1840, when he succeeded to the dukedom and entered the House of Lords. In 1842, he was appointed Lord Lieutenant of Oxfordshire, a post he held until his death. On 20 March 1845 he was appointed Lieutenant-Colonel Commandant of the Queen's Own Oxfordshire Yeomanry in which his two eldest sons also served.

In parliament, Blandford became an Ultra-Tory, splitting with Wellington in opposition to Catholic emancipation. In response to the Roman Catholic Relief Act 1829, Blandford introduced the first major reform bill in February 1830, calling for transfer of rotten borough seats to the counties and large towns, disfranchisement of non-resident voters, prevention of holders of office under the Crown from sitting in Parliament, payment of a salary to MPs, and the general franchise for men who owned property. He believed that somewhat more open elections could be relied upon to oppose Catholicism.

== Cricket ==
He played cricket as a young man and is recorded in one important match in 1817, totalling 4 runs with a highest score of 4.

== Yachting ==
He was a keen sailor, a member of the Royal Yacht Squadron, and sailed his yacht Wyvern in the 1851 America's Cup. Henry Jeffrey Flower, 4th Viscount Ashbrook, the father of his second wife, was a founder member of the Squadron, and his family participated in the Cowes social scene.

In 1845 he challenged Henry Thomas Hope and his yacht Zypheretta to a race from Yarmouth Roads around the Eddystone Lighthouse and back, a course of 224 miles, for a stake of £1000. The yachts set off on the 17th September, but encountered such heavy weather that both contestants made for port, reported in the local press as 'many a fruit schooner would have weathered the breeze, and would certainly have contested longer for the thousand pounds',

== Family ==
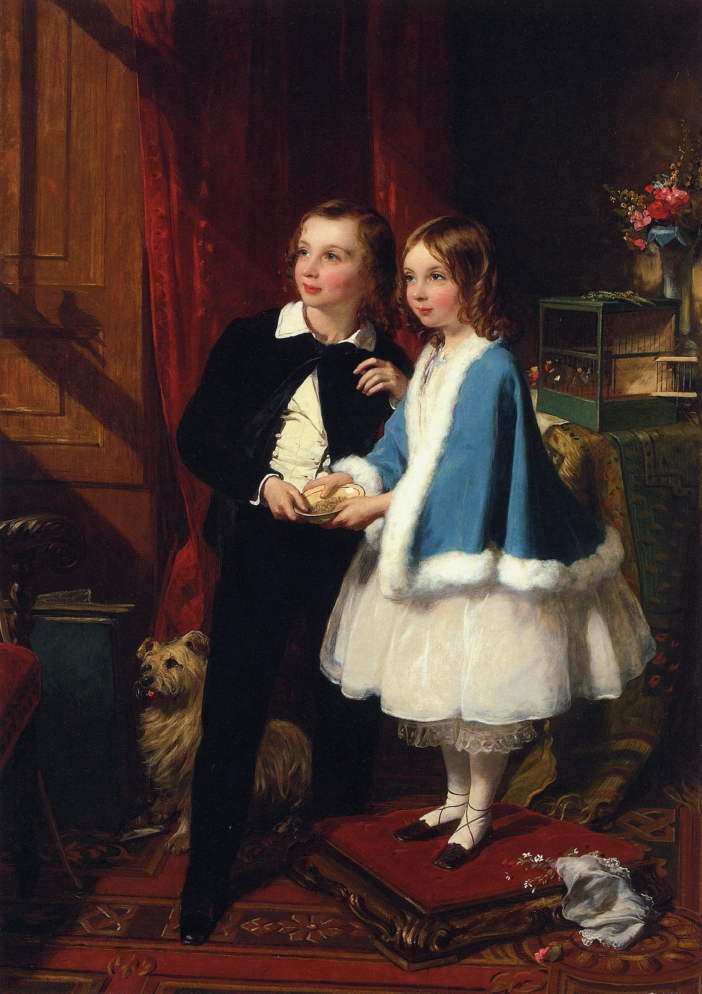
Portrait of Lord Almeric and Lady Clementina, the children of the 6th Duke by his second wife, Charlotte Augusta Flower by James Sant in 1876

His surname was Spencer until 1817, when his father changed his and his children's surname to Spencer-Churchill (by royal licence dated 26 May 1817). As a young man, he went through a false ceremony of marriage to Susannah Law, with his brother Lord Charles posing as a cleric. They lived as a married couple under the name Captain and Mrs Lawson and had a baby girl, named Susanna. Upon discovery of the deception a voyage to Scotland, was intended by the bride and her parents to make this marriage legal under Scottish law. The sixth Duke did, however, successfully contest in a court of law that they had lived as if they had been married.

Child by Harriet Caroline Octavia Spencer, who subsequently married her cousin, Count Karl Theodor von Westerholt (1795–1863), son of Count Alexander von Westerholt, in 1819:

- Susan Harriett Elizabeth Churchill (1818–1887), married Aimé Timothée Cuénod (1808–1882).

He married, firstly, his first cousin Lady Jane Stewart (1798–1844), daughter of George Stewart, 8th Earl of Galloway, on 13 January 1819. They had four children:

- Lady Louisa Spencer-Churchill (c. 1820–1882), married the Hon. Robert Spencer, son of Francis Spencer, 1st Baron Churchill, and had issue.
- John Winston Spencer-Churchill, 7th Duke of Marlborough (1822–1883).
- Lord Alfred Spencer-Churchill (1824–1893), married the Hon. Harriet Gough-Calthorpe, daughter of Frederick Gough, 4th Baron Calthorpe, and had issue.
- Lord Alan Spencer-Churchill (25 July 1825 – 18 April 1873), married Rosalind Dowker.

After his first wife's death in October 1844, aged 46, he married, secondly, the Hon. Charlotte Augusta Flower (1818–1850), daughter of Henry Flower, 4th Viscount Ashbrook, on 10 June 1846. They had two children:

- Lord Almeric Athelstan Spencer-Churchill (1847 – 12 December 1856), died young.
- Lady Clementina Augusta Spencer-Churchill (4 May 1848 – 27 March 1886), married John Pratt, 3rd Marquess Camden, and had issue.

After his second wife's death in April 1850, aged 31, he married, thirdly, his first cousin Jane Frances Clinton Stewart (1818–1897), daughter of the Hon. Edward Richard Stewart and granddaughter of John Stewart, 7th Earl of Galloway, on 18 October 1851. They had one child:

- Lord Edward Spencer-Churchill (28 March 1853 – 5 May 1911), married Augusta Warburton, daughter of Major George Drought Warburton, and had issue.

The 6th Duke of Marlborough died at Blenheim Palace on 1 July 1857, aged 63, and was succeeded by his eldest son, John. The Duchess of Marlborough died at 28 Grosvenor Street in Mayfair, London, in March 1897, aged 79.

== Sources ==
- Mary Soames; The Profligate Duke: George Spencer Churchill, Fifth Duke of Marlborough, and His Duchess (1987)

Parliament of the United Kingdom
| Preceded by Charles Brooke; John Maitland | Member of Parliament for Chippenham; 1818–1820; With: William Miles 1818–1820 | Succeeded by William Madocks; John Grossett |
| Preceded by John Gladstone; James Langston | Member of Parliament for Woodstock; 1826–1831; With: Lord Ashley 1826–1830; Lord Charles Spencer-Churchill 1830–1831 | Succeeded by Lord Charles Spencer-Churchill; Viscount Stormont |
| Preceded by Lord Charles Spencer-Churchill; Viscount Stormont | Member of Parliament for Woodstock; 1832–1835 | Succeeded by Lord Charles Spencer-Churchill |
| Preceded by Henry Peyton | Member of Parliament for Woodstock; 1838–1840 | Succeeded by Sir Frederic Thesiger |
Honorary titles
| Preceded by The Earl of Macclesfield | Lord Lieutenant of Oxfordshire; 1842–1857 | Succeeded by The Duke of Marlborough |
Peerage of England
| Preceded by George Spencer-Churchill | Duke of Marlborough; 1840–1857 | Succeeded by John Spencer |
