= John Spencer-Churchill, 7th Duke of Marlborough =

British Conservative cabinet minister, politician, and nobleman (1822–1883)

His Grace The Duke of Marlborough KG PC
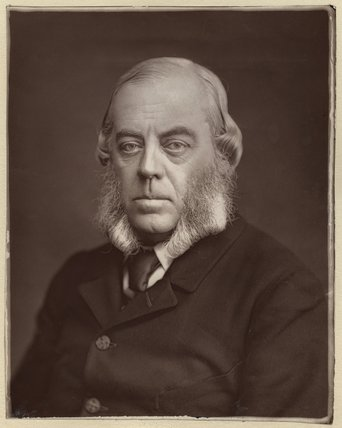

Lord Lieutenant of Ireland
- In office 11 December 1876 – 21 April 1880
- Monarch: Victoria
- Prime Minister: Benjamin Disraeli
- Preceded by: The Duke of Abercorn
- Succeeded by: The Earl Cowper

Lord President of the Council
- In office 8 March 1867 – 9 December 1868
- Monarch: Victoria
- Prime Minister: Benjamin Disraeli
- Preceded by: The Duke of Buckingham and Chandos
- Succeeded by: The Earl de Grey and Ripon

Member of the House of Lords
- Lord Temporal
- In office 1 July 1857 – 4 July 1883
- Preceded by: George Spencer-Churchill, 6th Duke of Marlborough
- Succeeded by: George Spencer-Churchill, 8th Duke of Marlborough

Personal details
- Born: 2 June 1822 Garboldisham Hall, Garboldisham, Norfolk, England
- Died: 4 July 1883 (aged 61) Berkeley Square, Mayfair, London, England
- Party: Conservative
- Spouse: Lady Frances Vane (m. 1843)
- Children: George Spencer-Churchill, 8th Duke of Marlborough; Lord Frederick Spencer-Churchill; Cornelia Guest, Baroness Wimborne; Rosamund Fellowes, Baroness de Ramsey; Lord Randolph Churchill; Fanny Marjoribanks, Baroness Tweedmouth; Anne Innes-Ker, Duchess of Roxburghe; Lord Charles Spencer-Churchill; Lord Augustus Spencer-Churchill; Georgiana Curzon, Countess Howe; Lady Sarah Wilson
- Parents: George Spencer-Churchill, 6th Duke of Marlborough; Lady Jane Stewart
- Education: Oriel College, Oxford

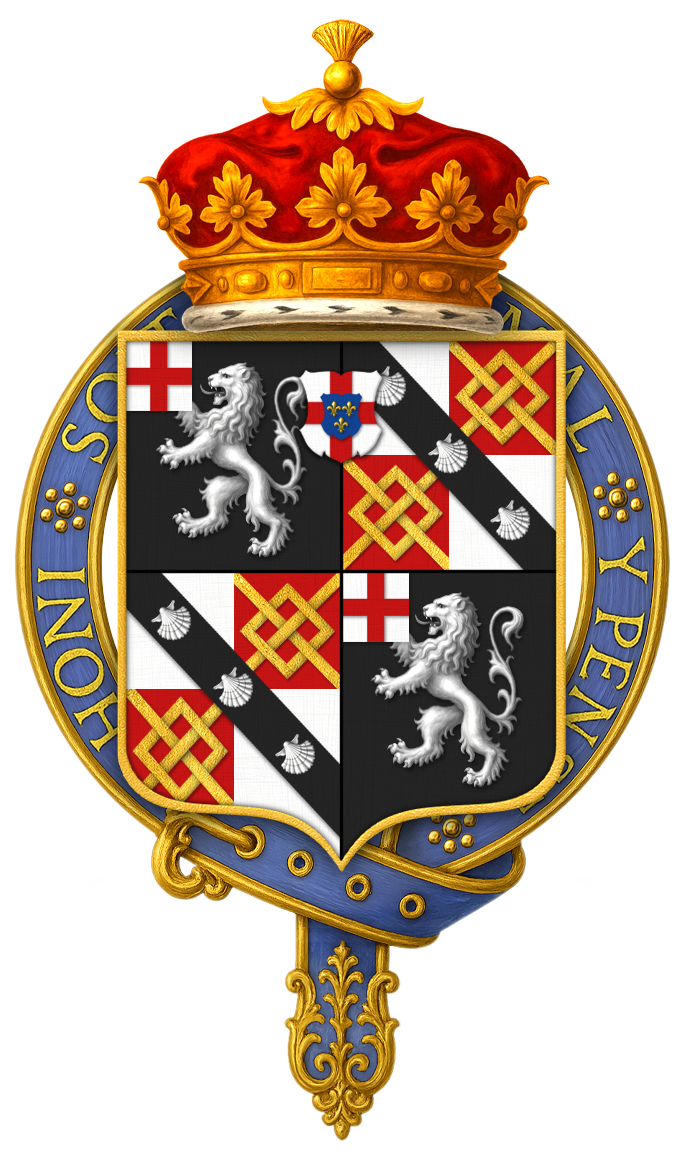
Quartered arms of John Winston Spencer-Churchill, 7th Duke of Marlborough, KG, PC

John Winston Spencer-Churchill, 7th Duke of Marlborough KG PC (2 June 1822 – 4 July 1883), styled Earl of Sunderland from 1822 to 1840 and Marquess of Blandford from 1840 to 1857, was a British Conservative cabinet minister, politician, peer, and nobleman. He was the paternal grandfather of Prime Minister Sir Winston Churchill.

== Background and education ==
John Winston Spencer-Churchill was born at Garboldisham Hall, Norfolk, the eldest son of George Spencer-Churchill, 6th Duke of Marlborough, and Lady Jane Stewart, daughter of Admiral George Stewart, 8th Earl of Galloway. He was educated at Eton College and Oriel College, Oxford.

Spencer-Churchill was commissioned as a lieutenant in the Queen's Own Oxfordshire Yeomanry in 1842 and was promoted to captain on 22 April 1847. His father and younger brother also served in the regiment.

Spencer-Churchill held 23,000 acres (9,300 hectares), mostly in Oxfordshire.

== Political career ==
Spencer-Churchill was Member of Parliament for Woodstock from 1844 to 1845 and again from 1847 to 1857. He was responsible for the New Parishes Act 1856 (19 & 20 Vict. c. 104), enabling populous parishes to be divided for purposes of church work. In 1857, he succeeded his father in the dukedom and entered the House of Lords.

He served under Lord Derby as Lord Steward of the Household from 1866 to 1867, and under Derby and later Benjamin Disraeli as Lord President of the Council—with a seat in the cabinet—from 1867 to 1868. He was sworn of the Privy Council in 1866, and made a Knight of the Garter in 1868. On the formation of Disraeli's second cabinet in 1874, he was offered, but declined, the viceroyalty of Ireland. He again held office under Disraeli as Lord Lieutenant of Ireland from 1876 to 1880.

Spencer-Churchill was president of The Shipwrecked Fishermen and Mariners' Royal Benevolent Society for many years. He died suddenly of angina pectoris at 29 Berkeley Square, London, on 4 July 1883. After lying in state at Blenheim Palace, he was buried in the private chapel on 10 July.

== Family ==
On 12 July 1843, Spencer-Churchill married Lady Frances Anne Emily Vane (15 April 1822 – 16 April 1899), eldest daughter of the 3rd Marquess of Londonderry and Lady Frances Vane-Tempest. They had eleven children:

- George Charles Spencer-Churchill, 8th Duke of Marlborough (13 May 1844 – 9 November 1892), whose son Charles Spencer-Churchill, 9th Duke of Marlborough, married into the Vanderbilt family.
- Lord Frederick John Winston Spencer-Churchill (2 February 1846 – 5 August 1850)
- Lady Cornelia Henrietta Maria Spencer-Churchill (17 September 1847 – Upper Brook Street, Mayfair, London, 22 January 1927), married 25 May 1868 Ivor Guest, 1st Baron Wimborne, by whom she had issue.
- Lord Randolph Henry Spencer-Churchill (13 February 1849 – 24 January 1895), married 15 April 1874 Jennie Jerome. Their issue included Sir Winston Churchill and John Strange "Jack" Spencer-Churchill.
- Lady Rosamund Jane Frances Spencer-Churchill (9 November 1851 – 3 December 1920), married 12 July 1877 William Fellowes, 2nd Baron de Ramsey, by whom she had issue.
- Lady Fanny Octavia Louise Spencer-Churchill (29 January 1853 – 5 August 1904), married 9 June 1873 Edward Marjoribanks, 2nd Baron Tweedmouth, by whom she had issue.
- Lady Anne Emily Spencer-Churchill (Lower Brook Street, Mayfair, London, 14 November 1854 – South Audley Street, Mayfair, London, 20 June 1923), married 11 June 1874 James Innes-Ker, 7th Duke of Roxburghe, by whom she had issue.
- Lord Charles Ashley Spencer-Churchill (25 November 1856 – 11 March 1858)
- Lord Augustus Robert Spencer-Churchill (4 July 1858 – 12 May 1859)
- Lady Georgiana Elizabeth Spencer-Churchill (10 St James's Square, St James's, London, 14 May 1860 – 9 February 1906), married 4 June 1883 Richard George Penn Curzon, 4th Earl Howe, by whom she had issue.
- Lady Sarah Isabella Augusta Spencer-Churchill (4 July 1865 – 22 October 1929), a war correspondent during the Boer War; married 21 November 1891 Lt. Col. Gordon Chesney Wilson (son of Sir Samuel Wilson MP), by whom she had issue.

Marlborough died on 4 July 1883, aged 61, and was succeeded in the title by his eldest son, George. His wife died sixteen years later, on 16 April 1899, aged 77.

== Portrayals in film and television ==
Marlborough was portrayed by Cyril Luckham in the 1974 Thames Television mini-series Jennie: Lady Randolph Churchill.

== Ancestry ==
Ancestors of John Spencer-Churchill, 7th Duke of Marlborough

8. George Spencer, 4th Duke of Marlborough
4. George Spencer-Churchill, 5th Duke of Marlborough
9. Lady Caroline Russell
2. George Spencer-Churchill, 6th Duke of Marlborough
10. John Stewart, 7th Earl of Galloway
5. Lady Susan Stewart
11. Anne Dashwood
1. John Spencer-Churchill, 7th Duke of Marlborough
12. John Stewart, 7th Earl of Galloway (=10)
6. George Stewart, 8th Earl of Galloway
13. Anne Dashwood (=11)
3. Lady Jane Stewart
14. Henry Paget, 1st Earl of Uxbridge
7. Lady Jane Paget
15. Jane Champagné

Parliament of the United Kingdom
Preceded by Sir Frederic Thesiger	Member of Parliament for Woodstock; 1844–1845	Succeeded by Viscount Loftus
Preceded by Lord Alfred Spencer-Churchill	Member of Parliament for Woodstock; 1847–1857	Succeeded by Lord Alfred Spencer-Churchill
Political offices
Preceded by The Earl of Bessborough	Lord Steward; 1866–1867	Succeeded by The Earl of Tankerville
Preceded by The Duke of Buckingham and Chandos	Lord President of the Council; 1867–1868	Succeeded by The Earl of Ripon
Preceded by The Duke of Abercorn	Lord Lieutenant of Ireland; 1876–1880	Succeeded by The Earl Cowper
Honorary titles
Preceded by The Duke of Marlborough	Lord Lieutenant of Oxfordshire; 1857–1883	Succeeded by Sir Henry Dashwood, Bt
Peerage of England
Preceded by George Spencer-Churchill	Duke of Marlborough; 1857–1883	Succeeded by George Spencer-Churchill
