= Kenninghall Road Mill, East Harling =

Windmill in East Harling, Norfolk, England

East Harling Windmill
- Interactive map of East Harling Windmill

Origin
- Mill name: Norwich Road Mill; Fendick's Mill
- Mill location: TM 0008 8608
- Coordinates: 52°29′10″N 0°56′34″E
- Operator: Private
- Year built: 1820

Information
- Purpose: Corn
- Type: Tower mill
- Storeys: Four storeys
- No. of sails: Four sails
- Type of sails: Double Patent sails
- Windshaft: Cast iron
- Winding: Fantail
- Fantail blades: Six blades
- No. of pairs of millstones: Two pairs

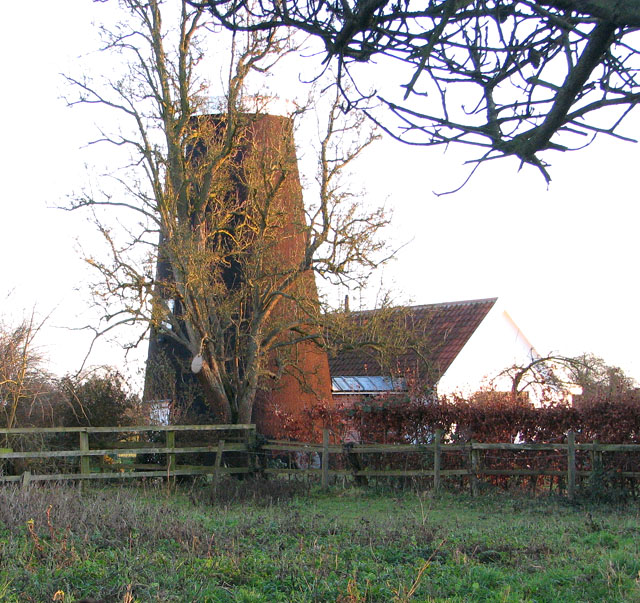
East Harling tower windmill

Kenninghall Road Mill is a Grade II listed tower mill at East Harling, Norfolk, England which has been converted to residential accommodation.

== History ==
The mill was probably built in 1820. It first appeared in the Land Tax records in that year, owned by Thomas Burlingham. The mill was offered for sale by auction on 8 August 1943 at the Swan Inn, East Harling. Thomas Jary was the tenant miller at the time. The mill had been taken by James Lawrence by 1850. The mill was again offered for sale by auction on 11 February 1854 at the Swan Inn. James Lawrence retired in 1875 and the mill was taken by his son Thomas. He employed two brothers by the name of Pattinson, who were at the mill by 1902. In 1912, Thomas Lawrence committed suicide in the mill, hanging himself. In 1913, the mill was bought by Christopher Pattinson, who was also running the post mill at Garboldisham. The mill was last worked in 1919 but milling continued for a further three years by oil engine. This was located in a shed some way from the mill and powered a single pair of millstones.

Over the years, the mill was stripped of its sails and machinery. In 1974, the mill tower was refurbished, a new cap made and fitted with the windshaft from Topcroft Mill. In 1984, Breckland District Council granted planning permission for the mill to be converted for residential use.

== Description ==
Kenninghall Road Mill is a four-storey tower mill with a domed cap which was winded by a six bladed fantail. The mill had four double Patent sails. The tower is 35 feet (10.67 m) to the curb. The mill had two pairs of French Burr millstones.

== Millers ==
- Thomas Burlingham 1820–22
- John Waters 1823
- Thomas Burlingham 1824–25
- J Wright 1826–28
- George Kent 1829–31
- John Bream 1832
- Thomas Jary 1843–46
- James Lawrence 1850–75
- Thomas Clarence Lawrence 1875–1912
  - Christopher Gerorge Pattinson 1902–12
  - Pattinson 1902–12
- Christopher George Pattinson 1913–19

References for above:-
