= Garboldisham Windmill =

Windmill in Norfolk, England

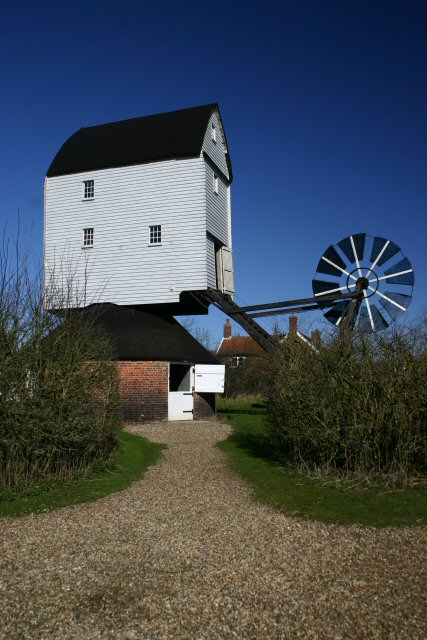
- The mill in 2007
- Interactive map of Garboldisham Windmill

Origin
- Mill name: Garboldisham Mill
- Mill location: TM 0026 8048
- Coordinates: 52°23′8.72″N 0°56′28.8″E
- Operator: Private
- Year built: 1770s

Information
- Purpose: Corn
- Type: Post mill
- Roundhouse storeys: Two storey roundhouse
- No. of sails: Four sails
- Type of sails: Patent sails
- Windshaft: Cast iron
- Winding: Fantail
- Fantail blades: Eight blades
- No. of pairs of millstones: Two pairs, located in the breast
- Size of millstones: 4 feet 4 inches (1.32 m)

Garboldisham Mill is a Grade II* listed post mill at Garboldisham, Norfolk, that has been restored.

== History ==
Although millers were recorded in Garboldisham during the sixteenth century, the first record of a windmill was in 1739 when Ishmael Pizzey left his windmill to his wife. In the 1770s, James Turner, a farmer of Blo' Norton, built the surviving mill. The mill was marked on Joseph Hodskinson's map of Suffolk, 1783 and Faden's map of Norfolk, 1797. Also shown on this map was a smock mill to the south which had been erected by James Turner in 1788. In 1802, he sold both mills to John Button for £795. A tower mill was built to the north of the post mill in 1820. A new windshaft was fitted on 8 July 1827. In March 1831, a pair of Patent sails were fitted to the mill. A fantail was also added at this time. It is likely that the mill was re-arranged with both pair of millstones relocated to the breast instead of being arranged head and tail. All three mills were shown on the 1837 Ordnance Survey map. The smock mill had gone by 1839. The post and tower mills were offered for sale by auction on 21 November 1839 at the Fox Inn, Garboldisham. The mills were not sold and were offered for sale or to let in February 1840. The smock mill may have burnt down on 22 August 1840. A fire was reported at a tower mill in Garboldisham on that date. Mary Button owned the mill in 1842, with John Button as the miller. William Button was the miller in 1854. The tower mill had been demolished by 1864 when the mill was offered for sale by auction at the King's Head, Diss. William Alfred Lawrence was the tenant miller at this time. He continued at the mill until he caught frostbite while tending the sails. This led to his death on 25 December 1871. His widow Emma was left to run the business. She engaged John Nunn from Dickleburgh to run the mill and farm.

On 3 August 1879, the mill lost two sails in a gale. The mill was repaired, with the width of the driving side of the sails increased from 4 feet 6 inches (1.37 m) to 6 feet (1.83 m). These were capable of driving both pairs of millstones at once. The mill was extended at the tail to allow space to fit a flour-dressing machine. A steam engine was also installed. This drove a single pair of millstones in an outhouse. John Nunn married Mrs Lawrence's daughter in 1892 and left the mill to run Grange Farm, Garboldisham. Mrs Lawrence's son Frederick ran the mill until he got married and moved away. He was replaced by John Tuck. In 1902, Mrs Lawrence retired and the mill was taken by Christopher George Pattinson, who was then employed as a miller at East Harling windmill. In 1906, a sail was blown off and its opposite member was removed to restore balance. The mill worked on a single pair of sails until 1914 when William Bennett, who had been engaged as miller, died. Pattinson's lease expired in 1917 and the mill was closed down.

The mill was let to Stephen Brock and in 1944 the Garboldisham Hall Estate, which owned the mill, was sold. The mill was bought by Brock's son. It was offered for sale in 1970. In 1971, emergency repairs were carried out as the mill was in danger of collapsing. These were funded by a grant of £3,050 from the Historic Buildings Council and a further grant from Norfolk County Council. By 1972 the roof of the roundhouse had gone, and the walls had been reduced in height. The mill was bought in March of that year for £250 by George Colman of Ixworth, Suffolk. His son Adrian set about the restoration of the mill, which was then the only post mill still standing in Norfolk. By 1975, a mill had been set up in the roundhouse and milling recommenced with power from an electric motor. The mill was gradually restored over the next 25 years. Garboldisham Mill remained the only post mill in Norfolk until 1984 when Thrigby Windmill was rebuilt on the surviving roundhouse of the original mill which had been demolished in 1892.

== Description ==
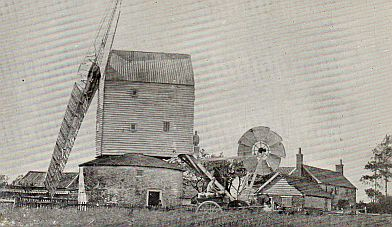
The mill c.1890

Garboldisham Mill is a post mill with a two-storey roundhouse. The mill is winded by an eight-bladed fantail.

=== Trestle and roundhouse ===
The trestle is formed of two crosstrees, four quarterbars and a main post. The main post is 1 foot 11 inches (580 mm) diameter at the crown tree.

=== Body ===
The body of Garboldisham Mill measures 21 feet (6.40 m) by 9 feet 9 inches (2.97 m) in plan.

=== Sails and windshaft ===
As originally built, the mill had a wooden windshaft and Common sails. These were later replaced by Patent sails and a cast-iron windshaft. The windshaft is 10 inches (250 mm) diameter at the brake wheel and 6 inches (150 mm) diameter at the tail. The mill was probably built with the millstones arranged "head and tail". The millstones are now located in the breast, driven by spur gearing.

=== Machinery ===
The windshaft carries an 8 feet 6 inches (2.59 m) diameter clasp arm brake wheel with iron segment teeth. This drives a 2 feet (610 mm) diameter cast iron wallower carried at the top of the cast iron upright shaft which is 4 inches (100 mm) diameter. At the lower end the 3 feet 10 inches (1.17 m) diameter great spur wheel drives two pairs of underdrift millstones via 17 inches (430 mm) diameter cast iron stone nuts with wooden cogs.

== Millers ==
- James Turner 1788–1802
- John Button 1802–42
- William Button 1854
- William Alfred Lawrence 1862–71
- Emma Lawrence 1871–1902
  - John Nunn 1871–92
  - Frederick Lawrence 1892–?
  - John Tuck ?–1902
- Christopher George Pattinson 1902–17
  - William Bennett ?–1914
- Adrian Colman 1975 to date

== Public access ==
Garboldisham Mill is open to the public by appointment.
