= Thrigby Windmill =

Windmill in Norfolk, England

Thrigby Post Windmill
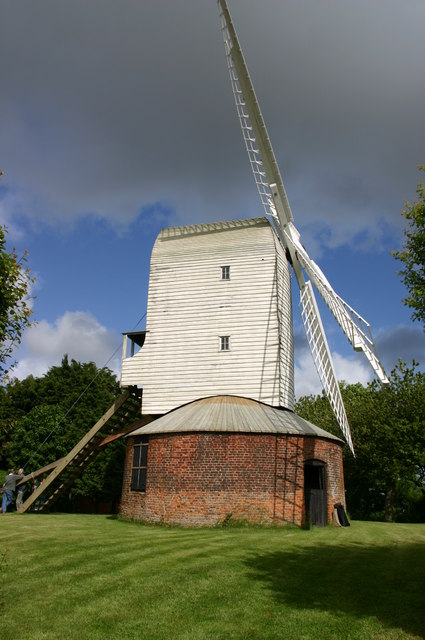
- Thrigby Post Windmill
- Interactive map of Thrigby Post Windmill

Origin
- Mill location: to the south of Mill Road east of Thrigby
- Grid reference: TG46821207
- Coordinates: 52.65181°N 1.66417°E
- Year built: c. 1790s

Thrigby Post Windmill is located in the civil parish of Mautby in the English county of Norfolk. The mill is on the south side of Mill Lane 1,125 yards (1.029 km) east of the village of Thrigby. The post mill is north of The River Bure, Breydon Water and the Halvergate Marshes.

== Description ==
Thrigby Post Windmill was built in about 1790 by Robert Woolmer who was the owner of close-by Thrigby Hall. The mill was constructed to grind wheat produced on the Thrigby estate. The post mill has a two-foot-square oak main post that rises vertically through the round house roof and carries the weatherboard clad body or "buck" of the mill, which contains all the machinery. The post mill was able to be turned on the centre post to bring the sails into the wind. The mill has four common sails and is built over a brick roundhouse which created a covered storage area and protecting the trestle from the weather.

== History ==
The post mill can be clearly seen on the 1797 map of the area produced by Faden. The last miller of Thrigby was Alfred Hood who was also a local farmer. He ran the mill until 1889 when the mill ceased working. In 1892 the wooden structure of the mill was found to be infested with death watch beetle and was then dismantled leaving only the brick roundhouse. In 1981, almost one hundred years after the mill ceased working, the mill was bought by Nick Prior who set about its restoration. The roundhouse was repaired and the mill rebuilt and has become one of only three post mills remaining in Norfolk. The other postmills are Garboldisham Windmill between Thetford and Diss and another postmill which is being built at South Walsham.
