= Garboldisham =

Village in Norfolk, England

Coordinates: 52.395°N 0.948°E

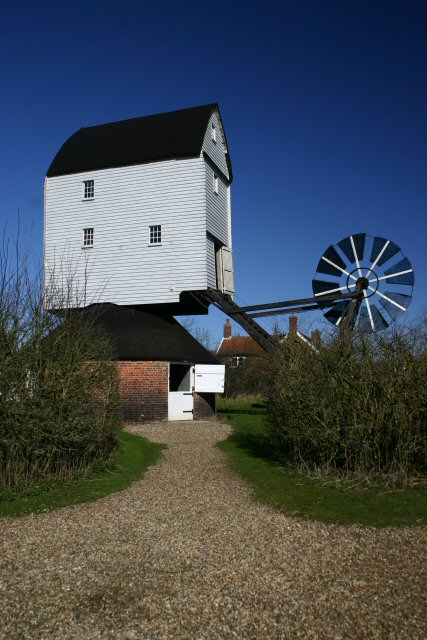
- Garboldisham Windmill

- Location within Norfolk
- Area: 13.80 sq mi (35.7 km^{2})
- Population: 990 (2021)
  - Density: 72/sq mi (28/km^{2})
- OS grid reference: TM005815
- Civil parish: Garboldisham
- District: Breckland
- Shire county: Norfolk
- Region: East
- Country: England
- Sovereign state: United Kingdom
- Post town: DISS
- Postcode district: IP22
- Dialling code: 01953
- Police: Norfolk
- Fire: Norfolk
- Ambulance: East of England
- UK Parliament: South West Norfolk

Garboldisham (/ˈɡɑːrbəlʃəm/) is a village and civil parish in the English county of Norfolk.

Garboldisham is located 7.1 miles (11.4 km) north-west of Diss and 22 miles (35 km) south-west of Norwich, along the A1066.

== Correct pronunciation ==
"Garboldsham"; "Garblesum"

== History ==
Garboldisham's name is of Anglo-Saxon origin and derives from the Old English for Gaerbald's homestead or village.

To the south of the village are the hamlets of Smallworth and Broomscot Common, the name of the latter possibly recalling the village's ancient pagan past, but more likely perhaps an affiliation to a Scandinavian with the surname Brun. This name might reflect the Viking invasions or Scandinavian connections of the Wuffingas, founders of the kingdom of East Anglia. It might even go further back in time, according to unsubstantiated theories that the pre-Roman Iceni inhabiting this area were Old English speakers rather than Cymric/Welsh.

There is a 10-foot high Bronze Age round barrow on Garboldisham Heath, known locally as 'Soldier's Hill' and 'Boadicea's Grave', although there is no evidence that Queen Boudicca is buried here. Local antiquarian Basil Brown carried out an excavation at the mound around 1963, and uncovered a burial urn, some cremated human bone, two flint flakes and a flint scraper. The burial probably dates from around 1300 BC and were likely disturbed by gravel quarrying in the nearby woods during the First World War.

In the Domesday Book of 1086, Garboldisham is listed as a settlement of 7 households in the hundred of Guiltcross. In 1086, the village was part of the East Anglian estates of King William I.

Garboldisham Hall was built in the early Nineteenth Century by Sir George Gilbert Scott. In the late Eighteenth Century, the hall was the property of Crisp Molineux who earned much of his wealth profiting from the plantations in Saint Kitts. In 1822, the hall was the birthplace of John Spencer-Churchill, 7th Duke of Marlborough. It was subsequently demolished in 1952.

== Geography ==
According to the 2021 census, Garboldisham has a population of 990 people which shows an increase from the 969 people recorded in the 2011 census.

Garboldisham is located along the A1066, between Thetford and Diss.

== Church of St. John the Baptist ==
Garboldisham's parish church is dedicated to Saint John the Baptist and dates from the Thirteenth Century. St. John's is located within the village on Church Street and has been Grade I listed since 1958. The church still holds regular Sunday services, usually three times a month.

St. John's holds a rare East Anglian example of a Galilee porch with the interior decoration largely the remnants of a Nineteenth Century restoration by James Powell and Sons. The church also holds an elaborate rood screen featuring various saints, a set of royal arms from the reign of Queen Anne and a font from the Fifteenth Century.

Garboldisham also holds the ruins of All Saints' Church, which was abandoned in 1734 after the tower collapsed into the nave, and a Methodist Chapel on the southern side of the A1066.

== Amenities ==
The village contains a Post Office with independent shop, selling a range of groceries as well as East Anglian regional "gourmet" produce.

Garboldisham Church of England Primary School is located close to St. John's Church and is part of St. Benet's Academy. The Headteacher of the school is Mrs. M. Croskell.

The village's pub has been open since the Seventeenth Century, in 2011 the council put forward plans to convert the building into five flats. This plan was opposed by the local community who formed a consortium and eventually bought the pub in 2016 and re-opened it a year later.

Garboldisham Cricket Club has a ground outside of the village on Harling Road and operates four men's teams, one women's team and juniors teams.

== In popular culture ==
The "Garboldisham Road" was mentioned in the A Bit of Fry and Laurie sketches "Information" and "Strawberries and Cream".

== Notable residents ==
- Crisp Molineux- (1730–1792) politician, lived in Garboldisham.
- John Spencer-Churchill, 7th Duke of Marlborough- (1822–1883) politician and landowner, born in Garboldisham
- Lord Alan Spencer-Churchill- (1825–1873) British Army officer and businessman, born in Garboldisham.
- Maj. Ernest Denny DSO- (1872–1949) Oxford University cricketer and British Army officer, died in Garboldisham.
- Lucinda Gooderham- (born 1984) rower, born in Garboldisham.

== Governance ==
Garboldisham is part of the electoral ward of Guiltcross for local elections and is part of the district of Breckland.

The village's national constituency is South West Norfolk which has been represented by Labour's Terry Jermy MP since 2024.

== War Memorial ==
Garboldisham's war memorial takes the form of a stone octagonal shaft on a two-stepped plinth topped with a cross adorned with a carving depicting Saint George and the Dragon, located at the junction of Manor and Church Road. The memorial was renovated in 2014 to mark the First World War Centenary and lists the following names:

Rank	Name	Unit	Date of death	Burial/Commemoration
Maj.	George F. Molyneux	3rd Bn., Grenadier Guards	22 Oct. 1915	Vermelles Cemetery
Capt.	WG. Flack MC & Bar	1st Bn., Royal Fusiliers	7 Sep. 1917	Étaples Military Cemetery
Lt.	Arthur L. Kennaway	1st Regt., Dorset Yeomanry	21 Aug. 1915	Green Hill Cemetery
2Lt.	Thomas R. Pollard	2nd Bn., Lincolnshire Regiment	2 Jul. 1918	Étaples Military Cemetery
Sgt.	Arthur C. Atkins	Royal Marines att. HMS Indefatigable	31 May 1916	Portsmouth Memorial
Cpl.	Frederick C. Lince	G Coy., Royal Engineers	20 Feb. 1919	St. John's Churchyard
Dvr.	Robert D. Smith	105th Bty., Royal Garrison Artillery	21 Jun. 1918	Staglieno Cemetery
Pte.	Walter Chapman	7th Bn., The Buffs	3 Nov. 1918	Étaples Military Cemetery
Pte.	James Anness	1st Bn., Essex Regiment	3 Nov. 1915	Helles Memorial
Pte.	Alan G. Garnham	2/8th Bn., Lancashire Fusiliers	11 Oct. 1918	Landrecies Cemetery
Pte.	Frederick Claxton	1st Bn., Norfolk Regiment	4 Sep. 1916	Thiepval Memorial
Pte.	Sidney W. Shearing	1st Bn., Norfolk Regt.	9 Oct. 1917	Tyne Cot
Pte.	Albert Reeve	7th Bn., Norfolk Regt.	30 Nov. 1917	Cambrai Memorial
Pte.	Arthur Brock	8th Bn., Norfolk Regt.	27 Sep. 1916	Thiepval Memorial
Pte.	Thomas C. Chaplin	8th Bn., Norfolk Regt.	5 Oct. 1916	Thiepval Memorial
Pte.	Herbert G. Reeve	8th Bn., Norfolk Regt.	1 Jul. 1916	Thiepval Memorial
Pte.	James Reeve	8th Bn., Norfolk Regt.	1 Jul. 1916	Thiepval Memorial
Pte.	Samuel L. Langley	2nd Bn., Suffolk Regiment	22 Jan. 1916	Menin Gate

The following names were added after the Second World War:

Rank	Name	Unit	Date of death	Burial/Commemoration
LCpl.	Walter C. Hurrell	2nd Bn., Royal Norfolk Regiment	8 May 1944	Kohima War Cemetery
