= Queen's Own Oxfordshire Hussars =

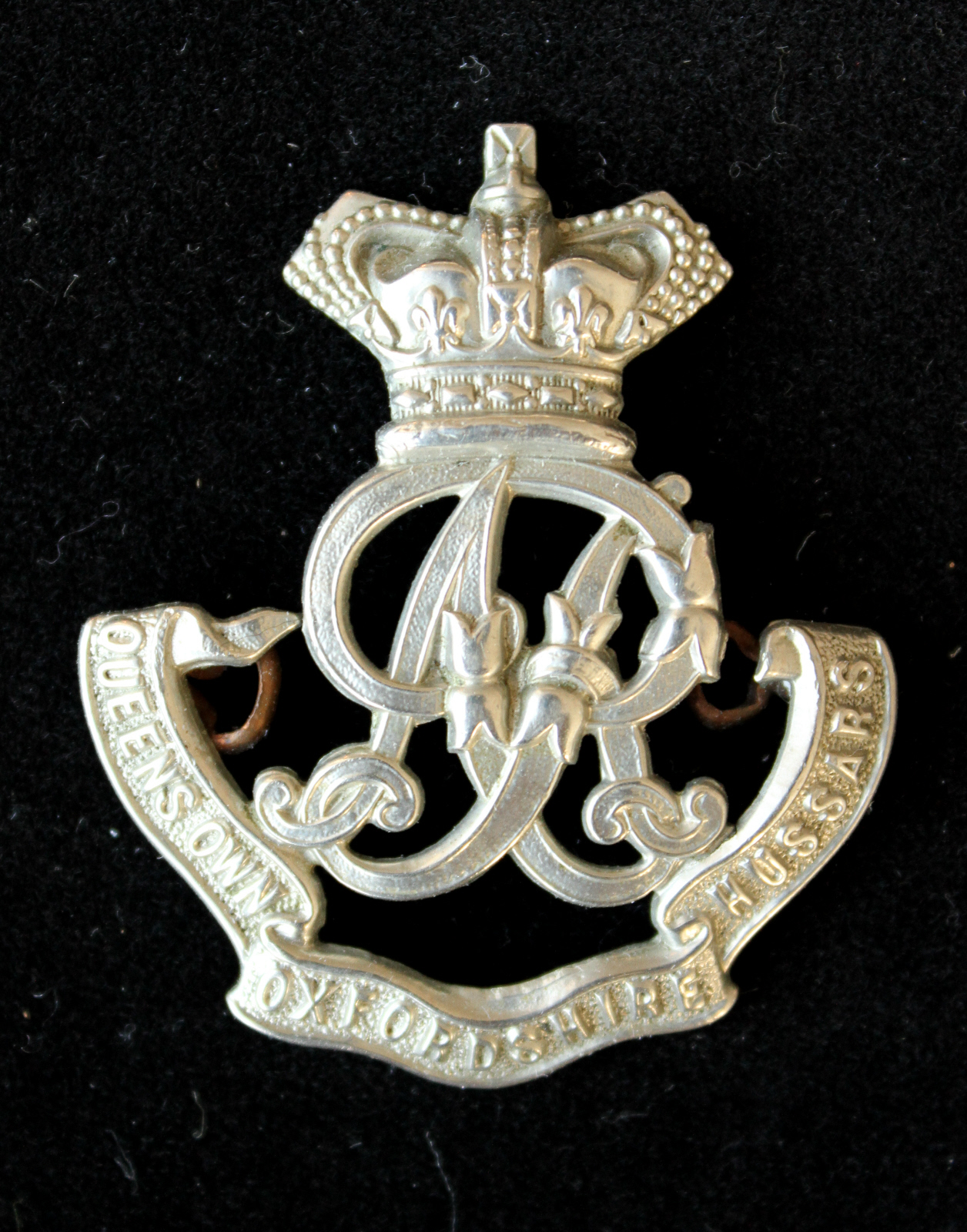
- cap badge
- Active: May 1798 – present
- Country: Kingdom of Great Britain (1794–1800); United Kingdom (1801–present)
- Branch: Army Reserve
- Type: Yeomanry
- Role: Mounted infantry Second Boer War; Cavalry World War I Artillery World War II; Signals; Port Maritime Present
- Size: Squadron (current)
- Part of: Royal Logistic Corps
- Garrison/HQ: Banbury
- Nicknames: Agricultural Cavalry; Queer Objects On Horseback
- Colors: Mantua Purple
- Engagements: Second Boer War; World War I; Western Front; World War II; North West Europe
- Battle honours: See Battle Honours below
- Website: Queen's Own Oxfordshire Hussars

Commanders
- Colonel of the Regiment: Winston Churchill

The Queen's Own Oxfordshire Hussars (QOOH) was a Yeomanry Cavalry regiment of the British Army's auxiliary forces, formed in 1798. It saw service in the Second Boer War with 40 and 59 Companies of the Imperial Yeomanry and was the first Yeomanry regiment to serve in Belgium and France during the Great War. After almost four years of Trench warfare on the Western Front, where cavalry had been superfluous, the QOOH led the advance during the Allies' victorious Hundred Days Offensive in 1918. In 1922, the QOOH became part of the Royal Artillery and during World War II it served as anti-tank gunners at Singapore and in North West Europe. After a series of postwar mergers and changes of role, the regiment's lineage is maintained by 142 (Queen's Own Oxfordshire Hussars) Vehicle Squadron, 165 Port and Maritime Regiment RLC.

== French Revolutionary and Napoleonic Wars ==
After Britain was drawn into the French Revolutionary Wars, Prime Minister William Pitt the Younger proposed on 14 March 1794 that the counties should form a force of Volunteer Yeoman Cavalry (Yeomanry) that could be called on by the King to defend the country against invasion or by the Lord Lieutenant to subdue any civil disorder within the county. In response to this call, a meeting of 'Nobility, Gentry, Freeholders and Yeomanry' was called at the Star Inn in Cornmarket, Oxford, in 1794. This led to the formation in May 1798 of a troop of yeomen known as the County Fencible Cavalry at Watlington, under the command of the Earl of Macclesfield. Three more troops were soon raised in the county, giving the following by the end of the year:

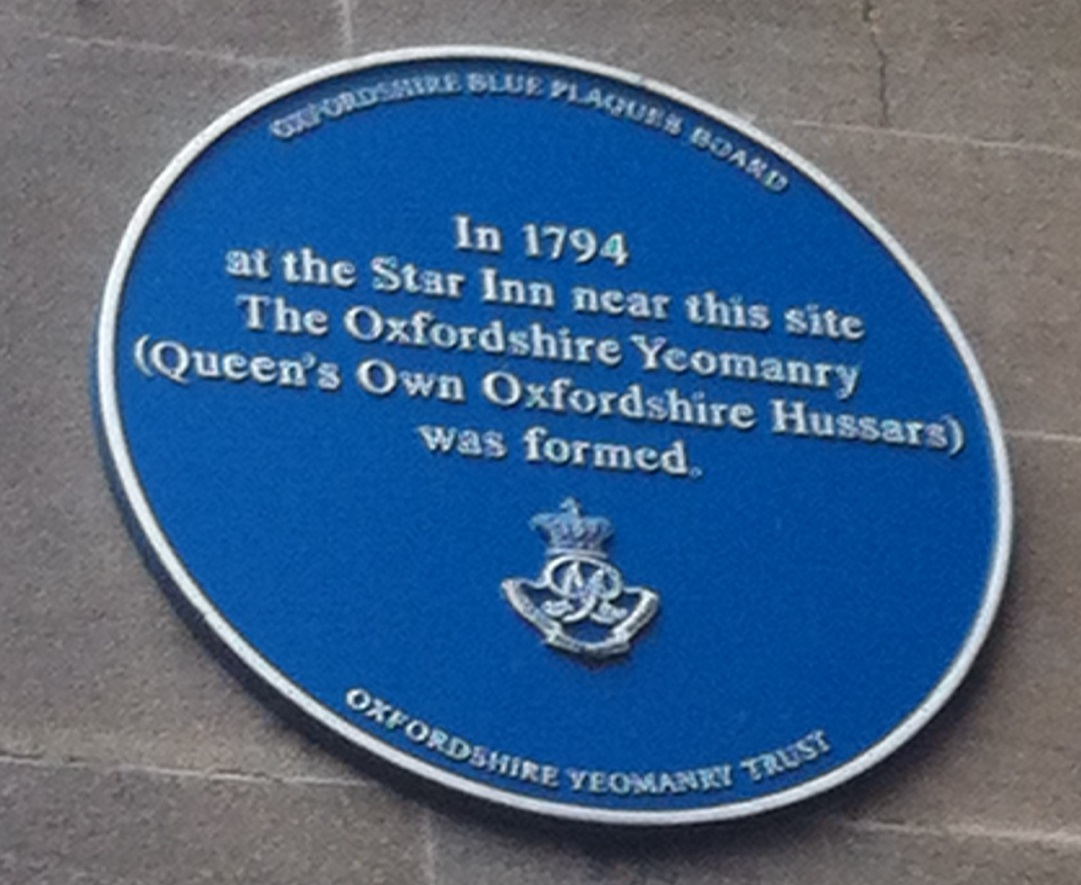
Blue plaque commemorating the founding of the Oxfordshire Yeomanry

- Watlington Cavalry
- Bloxham & Banbury Cavalry
- Bullingdon, Dorchester & Thame Cavalry
- Wootton Cavalry

After the brief Peace of Amiens broke down in 1803, the Bloxham & Banbury troop was raised to squadron strength under Major-Commandant George Frederick Stratton, and further troops were raised:

- Oxford Cavalry (two troops, one commanded by Lord Francis Spencer, younger brother of the 5th Duke of Marlborough)
- Ploughley Cavalry

== 19th century ==
The Yeomanry declined in importance and strength after the end of the French wars, Some of the original independent yeomanry troops were consolidated in 1818 to form the North Western Oxfordshire Regiment of Yeomanry, redesignated the 1st Oxfordshire Yeomanry Cavalry in 1823. Lord Francis Spencer, now 1st Baron Churchill, became lieutenant-colonel of the regiment. The yeomanry continued to decline, the War Office ceased to pay them when called out, and on 1 April 1828 the regiment was officially disbanded; however, several troops continued to serve without pay.

However, a wave of civil unrest across Britain from 1830 led to a revival of the Yeomanry, and in December the Oxfordshire regiment was reinstated. It was called out in 1830 to suppress riots at Otmoor and other places, and again in 1831 (Otmoor and Banbury), 1832 (Otmoor) and 1835. After a visit of Queen Adelaide, the regiment became the 1st or Queen's Own Regiment of Oxfordshire Yeomanry Cavalry on 7 November 1835, otherwise referred to as the Oxfordshire Yeomanry Cavalry (Queen's Own, Oxford).

Lord Churchill died on 10 March 1845 and George Spencer-Churchill, 6th Duke of Marlborough was gazetted to take over as Lt-Col Commandant on 20 March 1845; the 2nd Lord Churchill was appointed second Lt-Col on 5 April 1847. The Duke's younger son, Lord Alfred Spencer-Churchill, who had served in the 4th Light Dragoons and 83rd Foot, was appointed adjutant on 21 October 1848, and several other members of the Spencer-Churchill family and their relatives served as officers in the regiment, which by now consisted of six troops. Several of the officers gave Blenheim Palace as their address, and the regiment was officially headquartered at nearby Woodstock. After the 6th Duke died in 1857, Lord Churchill succeeded as Lt-Col Commandant and Lord Alfred Spencer-Churchill became second Lt-Col on 25 April 1860. Lieutenant-Col Henry Barnett took over the command on 8 May 1866, and later became the regiment's first Honorary Colonel.

The regiment adopted the title of Queen's Own Oxfordshire Hussars (QOOH) in 1888.

Following the Cardwell Reforms a mobilisation scheme began to appear in the Army List from December 1875. This assigned Yeomanry units places in an order of battle of corps, divisions and brigades for the 'Active Army', even though these formations were entirely theoretical, with no staff or services assigned. The Oxfordshire Yeomanry were assigned as 'divisional troops' to 2nd Division of II Corps based at Guildford, alongside Regular Army units of infantry, artillery and engineers stationed round Aldershot. This was never more than a paper organisation, but from April 1893 the Army List showed the Yeomanry regiments grouped into brigades for collective training. They were commanded by the senior regimental commanding officer but they did have a Regular Army Brigade major. The Oxfordshire Yeomanry together with the Buckinghamshire Yeomanry formed the 2nd Yeomanry Brigade. The Yeomanry brigades disappeared from the Army List after the Second Boer War.

== Imperial Yeomanry ==
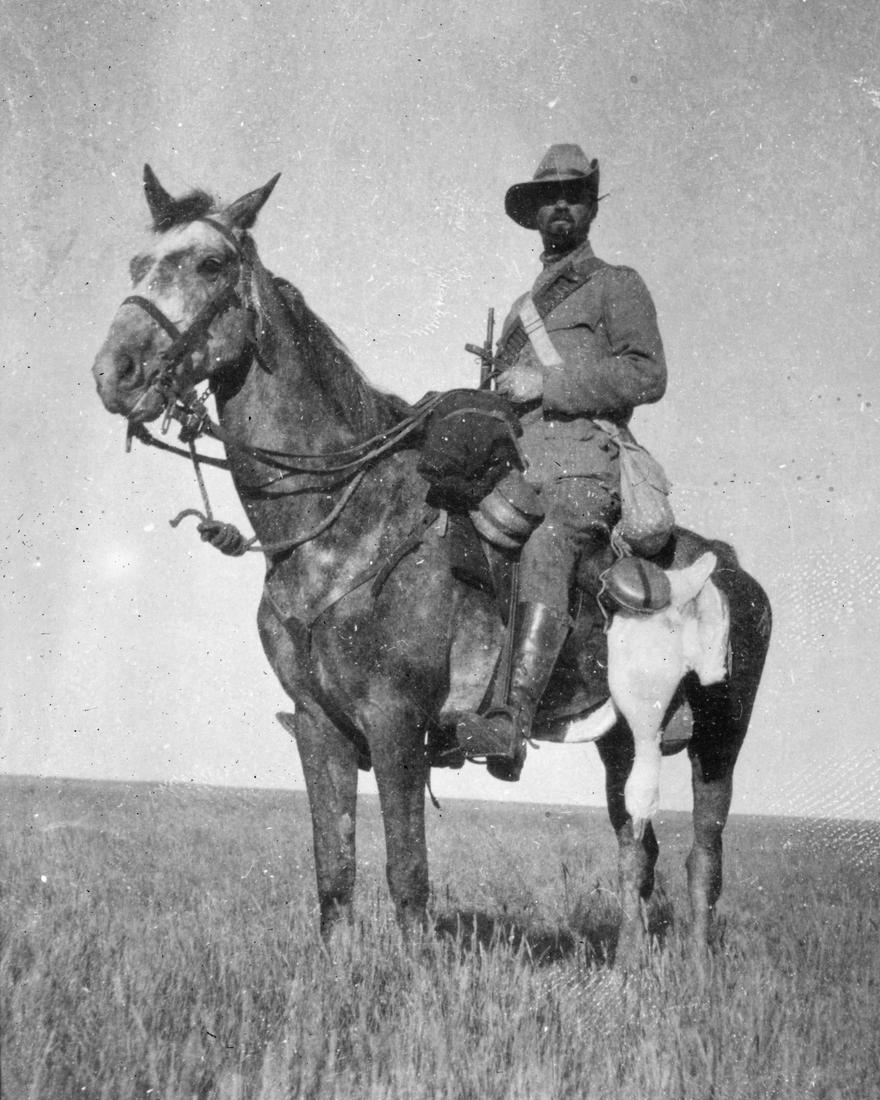
A typical Imperial Yeoman on campaign

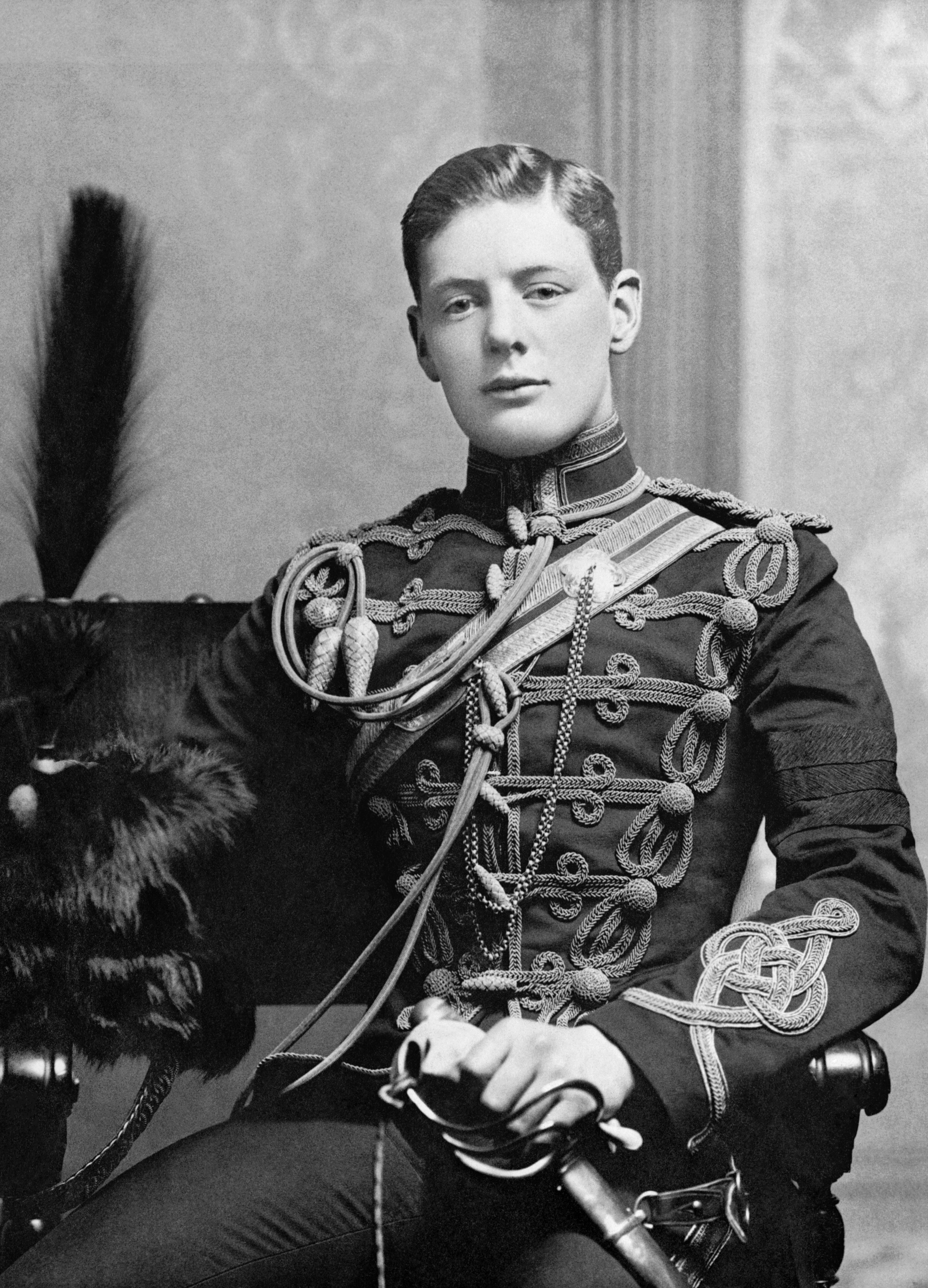
Lt Winston Churchill 1895 QOOH

Following a string of unexpected defeats during Black Week in early December 1899, attributed to the skill and determination of the Boer farmers – fast moving, highly skilled horsemen operating in open country – the British government realised that it would need more troops than just the regular army to fight the Second Boer War. On 13 December, the decision to allow volunteer forces to serve in South Africa was made, and a Royal Warrant was issued on 24 December. Under this warrant the Imperial Yeomanry (IY) was raised to match the Boers' skill as fast moving, mounted infantry. Among the officers chosen to organise this force was Viscount Valentia, Commanding officer(CO) of the Queen's Own Oxfordshire Hussars, who became Assistant Adjutant General. Charles Richard Spencer-Churchill, 9th Duke of Marlborough, who had joined the regiment as a junior officer was also appointed to the Headquarters Staff in the temporary rank of captain.

The force was organised as county service companies of approximately 115 men signed up for one year, and volunteers from the current and former members of the Yeomanry and civilians (usually middle and upper class) quickly filled the new force, which was equipped to operate as Mounted infantry. Over 20,000 men came forward in two years, among them about 240 from Oxfordshire.

Some came because they saw a chance of emigrating at government expense; some for love of sport and excitement; some because their domestic affairs were in a tangle from which enlistment offered a ready escape; some because they were tired of their present occupation; some because they wanted a job; some because they wanted a medal, and some because others came.—Trooper Sidney Peel, one of the Imperial Yeomanry from Oxfordshire

The Oxfordshire Yeomanry sponsored the 40th and 59th (Oxfordshire) Companies, IY. 40th Company landed in South Africa on 27 February 1900 and was placed in 10th Battalion, IY; 59th Company arrived on 29 March and was in 15th Battalion; in each case the Oxfordshire companies served alongside those raised by the Buckinghamshire and Berkshire Yeomanry.

The 10th Battalion IY went to Kimberley and joined the 1st Division under the command of Lord Methuen. Brigadier-General Lord Chesham of the Buckinghamshire Yeomanry commanded the division's mounted troops. On 5 April Methuen learned of the presence of a small Boer Commando led by the French Comte de Villebois-Mareuil and ordered Chesham's IY and other mounted troops to saddle up at once. The force caught the commando, pinned it with a few rounds of artillery fire, and then advanced by small rushes on both flanks, the IY taking the left flank. De Villebois-Mareuil was killed and his men surrendered. The Battle of Boshof was the first action for the new IY, but with little field training, only a brief musketry course, and few officers, they 'acted like veteran troops'. Methuen was 'much struck by the intelligent manner in which they carried out the attack and made use of cover'.

By May 1900 the 15th Bn was also assigned to Methuen's Column, but did not arrive until later. The column quickly became known as the 'Mobile Marvels'. On 14 May Methuen marched on Hoopstad and then continued into Orange Free State protecting the flank of Lord Roberts' main army. Methuen's column reached Bothaville on 24 May, but Roberts became concerned about his communications, so Methuen was switched to protecting the rear, and marched to Kroonstad, where the column arrived on 28 May, having completed a march of 168 miles (270 km) in 15 days over poor roads. On 30 May, Metheun was informed that the 13th (Irish) Bn IY was cut off at Lindley, and he rode with three of his own IY battalions, including 10th Bn, to relieve them, covering 44 miles (71 km) in 24 hours. The mounted column had a five-hour fight to force its way past 3000 Boers led by Christiaan de Wet. Most of the force in Lindley had already surrendered, but 5th and 10th Bns IY under Lt-Col George Younghusband were able to free a number of the prisoners. Methuen then pushed on to relieve 9th Division, which was besieged at Heilbron, completing a march of 267 miles (430 km) in under a month.

Methuen's Column now took part in the pursuit of de Wet's force south down the railway towards Kroonstad, beginning with a sharp action at Rhenoster River on 24 June. The 'Great de Wet Hunt' began in earnest in August. On 6 August Methuen set out with 5th and 10th Bns IY, some infantry and artillery to catch the Boer commander at Scandinavia Drift, switching to Schoeman's Drift when better intelligence arrived. De Wet and half his force had got across the drift before Methuen arrived, but the rearguard was cleared and the column pressed forward. Methuen sent Chesham and the IY towards Frederikstad to cut off de Wet, but after their long march the day before the yeomanry could not keep up with the Boers.

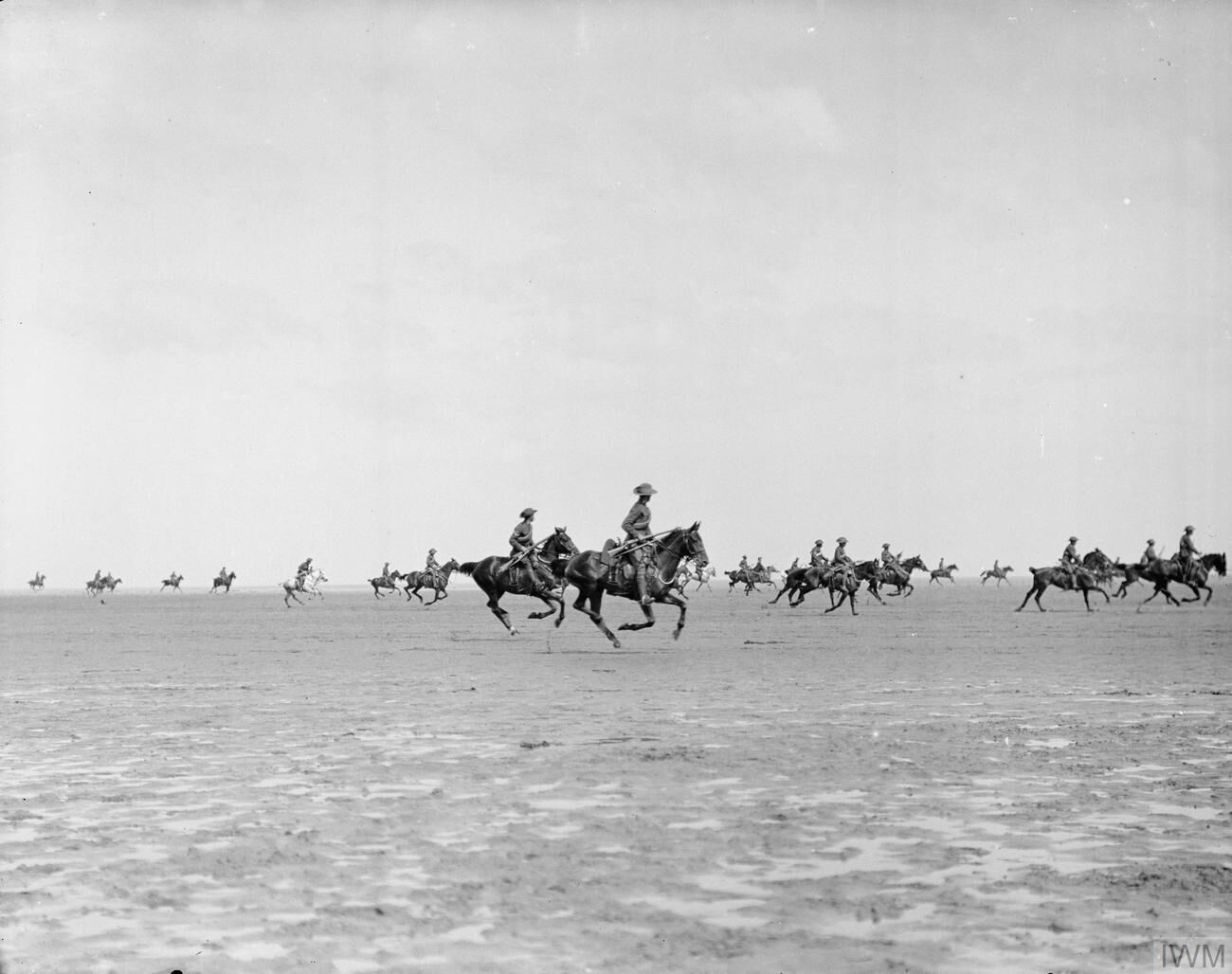
Imperial Yeomanry galloping over a plain during the Second Boer War.

The Great de Wet Hunt by numerous British columns continued through August and September, with Methuen personally leading a column including the 1st Yeomanry Brigade under Chesham. Methuen drove his force on with little rest, to Welverdiend Pass and Taaibosch Spruit, then to Frederikstad. On 12 August the column engaged the Boers at Mooi River Bridge for four hours, capturing guns and wagons and freeing British prisoners. Methuen's column had covered 150 miles (240 km) in six days, driving de Wet towards the Olifant's Nek pass, which Methuen believed was blocked by other columns. On the night of 13/14 August his troops set out to catch the Boers, engaging them at Buffelshoek about 6 miles (9.7 km) from the pass. However, the Boers escaped through the pass, which had not been blocked. With his troops exhausted, Methuen had to call off the pursuit. Chesham's IY battalions were sent to garrison Ottoshoop.

Drives to catch the remaining commandos went on for almost another two years. The First Contingent of the IY completed their year's term of service in 1901 and the two Oxfordshire companies returned home, having earned the QOOH its first Battle honour: South Africa 1900–01.

The Imperial Yeomanry were trained and equipped as mounted infantry. The concept was considered a success and before the war ended the existing Yeomanry regiments at home were converted into Imperial Yeomanry, with an establishment of HQ and four squadrons with a machine gun section. This included the Oxfordshire unit, which became the Oxfordshire Imperial Yeomanry (Queen's Own Oxfordshire Hussars), renamed on 1 April 1901.

Sir Winston Churchill joined the QOOH as a captain in 1902 and remained an enthusiastic supporter for the rest of his life, having a significant influence on the fortunes of the regiment during both World Wars, and even giving it a special place of honour at his funeral. The latter's great personal friend, F.E. Smith, later 1st Lord Birkenhead joined the same regiment in 1913 and was ultimately promoted to major in 1921.

== Territorial Force ==
The Imperial Yeomanry regiments were subsumed into the new Territorial Force (TF) under the Haldane Reforms of 1908, and dropped the 'Imperial' part of their titles. The Oxfordshire Yeomanry (QOOH) transferred, with the following organisation:

- Regimental Headquarters (RHQ) at Paradise Street, Oxford
- A Squadron at Oxford
- B Squadron at Woodstock, with detachments at Witney and Bicester
- C Squadron at Henley-on-Thames, with detachments at Watlington, Thame and Goring-on-Thames
- D Squadron at Banbury, with detachments at Chipping Norton, Deddington, Shipton, Charlbury and Burford

The regiment formed part of the TF's 2nd South Midland Mounted Brigade in Southern Command.

== World War I ==
=== Mobilisation ===
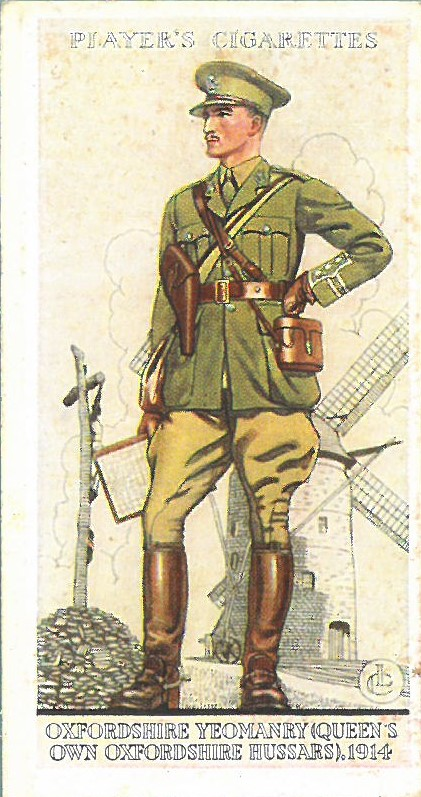
Player's cigarette card showing a captain of the Queen's Own Oxfordshire Hussars in field dress uniform in 1914. This figure is in uniform while deployed to France.

On the outbreak of World War I, the QOOH and the rest of the TF were embodied on 4 August 1914. In accordance with the Territorial and Reserve Forces Act 1907 (7 Edw. 7, c.9) which brought it into being, the TF was intended to be a home defence force during wartime and members could not be compelled to serve outside the country. However, soon after the outbreak of war, TF units were invited to volunteer for Overseas Service. On 15 August 1914, the War Office issued instructions to separate those men who had signed up for Home Service only, and form them into reserve units. On 31 August, the formation of a reserve or 2nd Line unit was authorised for each 1st Line unit where 60 per cent or more of the men had volunteered for Overseas Service. The titles of these 2nd Line units would be the same as the original, but distinguished by a '2/' prefix. In this way duplicate regiments, brigades and divisions were created, mirroring those TF formations being sent overseas. Later 3rd Line units were created to train reinforcements for the 1st and 2nd Lines.

=== 1/1st Queen's Own Oxfordshire Hussars ===
The regiment mobilised at Oxford and on 11 August under the command of Lt-Col A Dugdale, and joined 2nd South Midland Mounted Brigade at Reading, Berkshire. Four days later the brigade moved to Norfolk with the rest of 1st Mounted Division in the East Coast defences. Then on 29 August it moved to Churn on the Berkshire Downs, where it joined a new 2nd Mounted Division that was being assembled. After only a month's training, the regiment received a telegram from the First Lord of the Admiralty, Winston Churchill, instructing them to prepare for immediate embarkation. They were to join the Royal Naval Division (RND) which he was sending to Flanders to prevent a German advance towards the Channel ports. The QOOH thus became the first Yeomanry unit to go overseas, landing at Dunkirk on 22 September. It was typical of Churchill's enthusiasm for amateur soldiering that he should have thought up this plan for his own yeomanry regiment, in which his younger brother, Jack Churchill, was then serving.

==== Ypres 1914 ====
However, the QOOH did not accompany the RND when it moved from Dunkirk on 3 October to join the Defence of Antwerp; instead the regiment was retained under the base commandant at Dunkirk. It was assigned to GHQ Troops, and sent to cover the arrival by rail of French cavalry at Hazebrouck station to fill a gap during the 'Race to the Sea'. IV German Cavalry Corps was already moving towards Ypres, and some of its cyclists clashed with a QOOH patrol on 5 October; the regiment was thus the first TF unit to see action. The British Expeditionary Force (BEF) rushed up from the Battle of the Aisne to defend Ypres, bringing on the First Battle of Ypres. Over the following weeks the BEF hung on grimly in a series of battles round the town. At the end of October GHQ began releasing the TF units from their duties on the Lines of Communication to provide desperately needed reinforcements. On 31 October the QOOH was sent to 2nd Cavalry Brigade in 1st Cavalry Division, (Note: As such it was one of only six yeomanry regiments to be posted to a regular cavalry division in the war. The other five were: Bedfordshire Yeomanry in 1st Cavalry Division; Leicestershire Yeomanry in 3rd Cavalry Division; North Somerset Yeomanry in 3rd Cavalry Division; Essex Yeomanry also in 3rd Cavalry Division.; Queen's Own Yorkshire Dragoons in 4th Cavalry Division) which had been fighting dismounted in the Battle of Messines since 12 October. Two squadrons of the QOOH went up to join the brigade in the line at Messines, filling in for the 18th Hussars who had been detached, while the other squadron (Note: The war establishment of a cavalry regiment was three squadrons instead of the four squadrons of the peacetime Yeomanry.) remained behind to help dig a reserve defence line.

The fighting on 1 November saw 1st Cavalry Division reluctantly retiring off the Messines Ridge, where its flanks were 'in the air'. The withdrawal was carried out slowly and deliberately, and the Germans did not immediately follow up to the new British line. Next morning the division's 1st Cavalry Bde threw back a German attack and in the afternoon 2nd Cavalry Bde went forward to support a French attempt to recapture the lost ground. This attack had no chance of success, and at the end of the day the 2nd Cavalry Bde and QOOH relieved the 1st Cavalry Bde in the line. The focus of the German attacks then shifted away from Messines, and the fighting gradually died down. The QOOH was transferred to 4th Cavalry Bde in 2nd Cavalry Division on 11 November, to replace the Household Cavalry Composite Regiment, which had returned to the UK after its heavy casualties at Ypres. The QOOH remained with this formation for the rest of the war.

==== Trench warfare ====
The regiment was soon hardened to the realities of war. Although disparagingly nicknamed by men of the Regular Army 'Queer Objects On Horseback' or 'agricultural cavalry', the QOOH took part in many actions from Ypres in 1914 to Amiens and the final advance in 1918, winning battle honours and the lasting respect of their fellow members of 2nd Cavalry Division.

As cavalry they spent frustrating periods waiting in readiness to push on through the gap in the enemy's line, which never came. They toiled in working parties bringing up supplies, digging defensive positions, suffering the discomforts of appalling conditions, and frequently dismounting to fight fierce engagements on foot and in the trenches themselves. Formally, the 2nd Cavalry Division was engaged at the Second Battle of Ypres (April and May 1915), the Battle of Arras (April 1917) and the Battle of Cambrai (November 1917), and the QOOH was accordingly awarded the Battle Honours, but the cavalry's role was usually peripheral.

==== Spring Offensive ====
However, in the more mobile fighting initiated by the German spring offensive of March 1918, many of the cavalry who had previously been dismounted to hold or dig trenches were remounted to act as tactical reserves. At 10.00 on 25 March 4th Cavalry Bde reinforced 'Harman's Detachment' (improvised from the Cavalry Corps reinforcement camp), which had been holding III Corps' open flank since 23 March. The brigade watched the crossings of the River Oise and then remained in the line near Évricourt to cover the retirement of 5th Cavalry Bde and Harman's Detachment on 27 March. On 30 March the brigade supported 'Carey's Force' (improvised from Royal Engineers), and next day the brigade was assembled in the cover of the Luce Valley, ready to counter-attack. This attack was made the following morning, with three waves of dismounted cavalrymen advancing under cover of an artillery and machine gun barrage; it was successful, but afterwards the cavalry suffered serious casualties while holding off German counter-attacks. 2nd Cavalry Division was relieved that night. The Cavalry Corps had moved to reserve behind First Army when the second phase of the German Spring Offensive (the Battle of the Lys) was launched, and it was engaged at Hazebrouck on 14–15 April.

==== Hundred Days Offensive ====
There were more opportunities for open warfare during the Allied Hundred Days Offensive, which began with the Battle of Amiens on 8 August. 1918. Next morning 2nd Cavalry Division's brigades, each with a detachment of Whippet tanks, followed and supported the infantry of Canadian Corps in their advance. The following day 4th Cavalry Bde advanced from Rouvroy, but was driven back by fire from Fouquescourt, which was still in German hands. But better opportunities came as the German defences crumbled. During the pursuit to Hindenburg Line the on 3 September, 6th Infantry Bde was ordered to act as an advance guard, accompanied by six Whippets and a squadron of the QOOH. Although it was not until 13.00 that the cavalry and tanks moved off, by 14.20 they had driven and ridden as far as the Hermies–Demicourt line, overlooking the main Hindenburg defences on the Canal du Nord 2,000 yards (1,800 m) ahead. VI Corps had advanced nearly 6 miles (9.7 km) in a day.

2nd Cavalry Division was now spit up between the BEF's various armies. 4th Cavalry Bde was present when Third Army stormed the Hindenburg Line on 27 September (the Battle of the Canal du Nord), and during the subsequent pursuit to the River Selle the QOOH once again joined VI Corps' advance guard. On 10 October 1st and 2nd Guards Bdes advanced at 05.00, each accompanied by two troops of the QOOH, together with artillery, cyclists and machine guns; these brigade groups worked their way between defended positions and advanced 6 miles (9.7 km) in five bounds by the end of the day. During the subsequent Battle of the Selle, VI Corps pushed swiftly forwards on the morning of 23 October. At 11.15 the QOOH was ordered forwards with a brigade of field artillery and a company each of cyclists and machine gunners to pass beyond the final objective, across the Écaillon stream and the ridge and railway beyond, to see if the towns of Beaudignies and Bermerain on the Selle were occupied. This was too ambitious: although the Écaillon was just fordable, it was held by the enemy and VI Corps had to be content with its gains for the day. However, two days later the regiment went forwards with the machine gun company and this time a Hussar squadron advanced beyond the railway, found the front clear of the enemy and established a post until the infantry could catch up. From 8 to 10 November the QOOH provided two squadrons to lead V Corps advance. Now it was proving hard to find the enemy: the cavalry patrols reported all the villages in front unoccupied. On 11 November, 4th Cavalry Bde led Third Army forward until it found the enemy on the line of the River Thure. Hostilities ended at 11.00 that day when the Armistice with Germany came into force.

==== Postwar ====
The 2nd Cavalry Division re-assembled on 15 November, and then covered the front as Fourth Army advanced to Germany to establish the Army of Occupation. It then went into winter quarters in Belgium. Demobilisation began in early 1919, but even after the prewar Territorials had returned home and 2nd Cavalry Division had been broken up, 1/1st QOOH remained in service until it was finally disembodied on 31 March 1922.

=== 2/1st Queen's Own Oxfordshire Hussars ===
The 2nd Line regiment was formed at Oxford in September 1914. In January 1915 it was with 2/2nd South Midland Mounted Brigade and in April 1915 it joined 2/2nd Mounted Division at King's Lynn in Norfolk. Training was hampered by a lack of weapons and ammunition. On 31 March 1916, the remaining Mounted Brigades were ordered to be numbered in a single sequence; the brigade was numbered as 11th Mounted Brigade and the division as 3rd Mounted Division.

In July 1916, 2/1st QOOH was converted into a cyclist unit in 9th Cyclist Brigade, 1st Mounted Division (the 3rd Mounted Division renamed). The brigade was concentrated at Bridge near Canterbury in October 1916 and renumbered as the 5th Cyclist Brigade the following month. In February 1917, 2/1st QOOH joined the 4th Cyclist Brigade at Ipswich. By July it was at Wivenhoe, in November at Frinton and then went to Manningtree. About January 1918 it went to Ireland with the 4th Cyclist Brigade and was stationed at Dublin until the end of the war.

The 2/1st QOOH was disbanded in Dublin on 21 June 1919, when the personnel were sent to join an improvised Trench mortar battery for the continuing Irish War of Independence.

=== 3/1st Queen's Own Oxfordshire Hussars ===
The 3rd Line regiment was formed in 1915 at Oxford and in the summer it was affiliated to a Reserve Cavalry Regiment at Tidworth. In the summer of 1916 it was affiliated to the 8th Reserve Cavalry Regiment at The Curragh outside Dublin. Early in 1917 it joined the 2nd Reserve Cavalry Regiment, also at The Curragh.

The 3/1st QOOH was disbanded in 1918.

== Between the wars ==
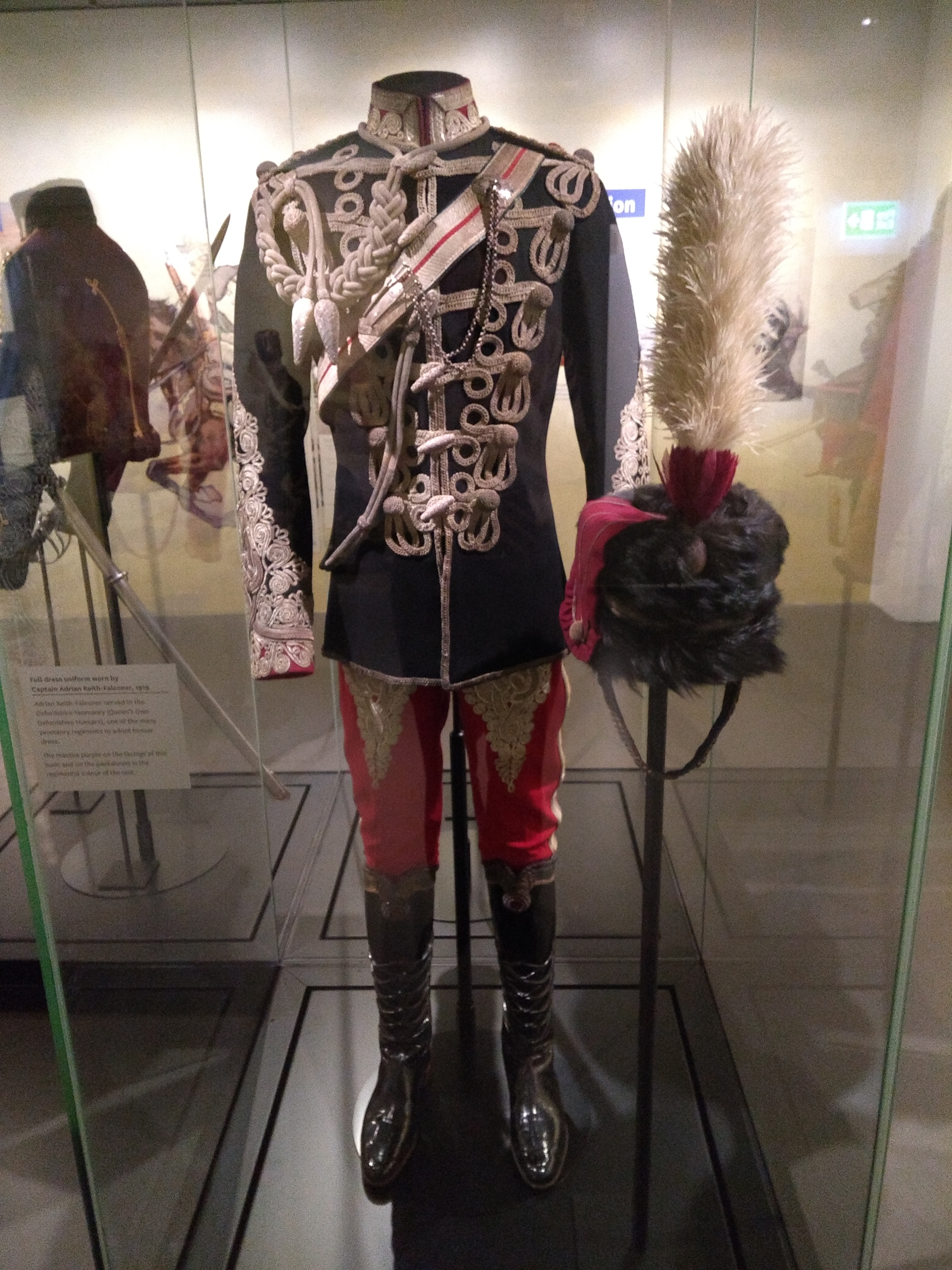
Officer's levee dress uniform, Queen's Own Oxfordshire Hussars, 1919

When the TF was reconstituted on 7 February 1920, the regiment reformed at Oxford, but 1/1st Oxfordshire Yeomanry remained in service until it was disembodied on 31 March 1922. However, the War Office had decided that only a small number of mounted Yeomanry regiments would be required in future, and the remainder would have to be re-roled, mainly as artillery. Some saw this as the end of the Yeomanry, which had originally been a mounted force based on hunting and horsemanship.

The QOOH transferred to the Royal Field Artillery (RFA) on 18 April 1922 to form two batteries (399th and 400th (Queen's Own Oxfordshire Hussars Yeomanry) Batteries, 400th being a howitzer battery) and part of HQ of the 100th (Worcestershire and Oxfordshire Yeomanry) Brigade, RFA, in the retitled Territorial Army (TA). Both batteries were initially at Oxford, though 400th Bty later moved to Banbury. The brigade HQ was at Worcester, later at Kidderminster. In 1924 the RFA was subsumed into the Royal Artillery (RA), and the unit was redesignated as an 'Army Field Brigade, RA', serving as 'Army Troops' in 48th (South Midland) Divisional Area.

As the British Army rearmed in the years before World War II, the 100th Field Brigade was converted on 28 November 1938 to the anti-tank role as 53rd (Worcestershire and Oxfordshire Yeomanry) Anti-Tank Regiment, RA (RA 'brigades' being redesignated 'regiments' at this time). The two QOOH batteries at Oxford and Easington (Banbury) were renumbered as 211 and 212 (Queen's Own Oxfordshire Hussars Yeomanry) A/T Btys. After the Munich Crisis the TA was doubled in size, and the 53rd A/T Rgt was split in 1939, the Worcester Yeomanry batteries remaining with the 53rd, and the QOOH batteries forming a new 63rd Anti-Tank Regiment, with the following organisation:

- Regimental Headquarters (RHQ) at Oxford
- 249–252 A/T Btys at Oxford

The establishment of the new anti-tank regiments was to be 48 2-pounder guns, organised into four batteries each of three troops, but many TA units had to make do with the 25 mm Hotchkiss anti-tank gun.

== World War II ==
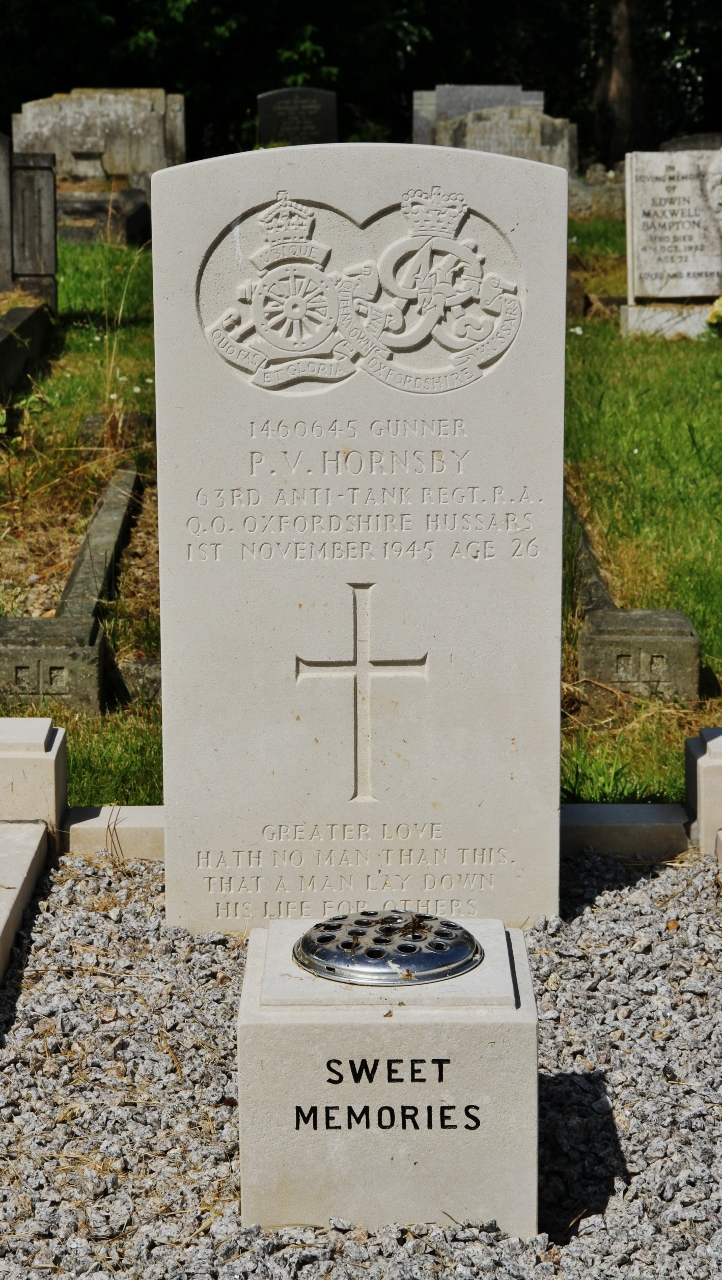
CWGC headstone of a QOOH gunner who died a few months after the end of the Second World War. The stone bears the dual insignia of the Royal Artillery (left) and QOOH (right).

=== 63rd (Oxfordshire Yeomanry) Anti-Tank Regiment, RA ===
==== Mobilisation and training ====
On the outbreak of war on 3 September 1939 63rd A/T Rgt mobilised at Oxford as part of 61st Division, which was being organised as the duplicate of 48th (South Midland) Division.

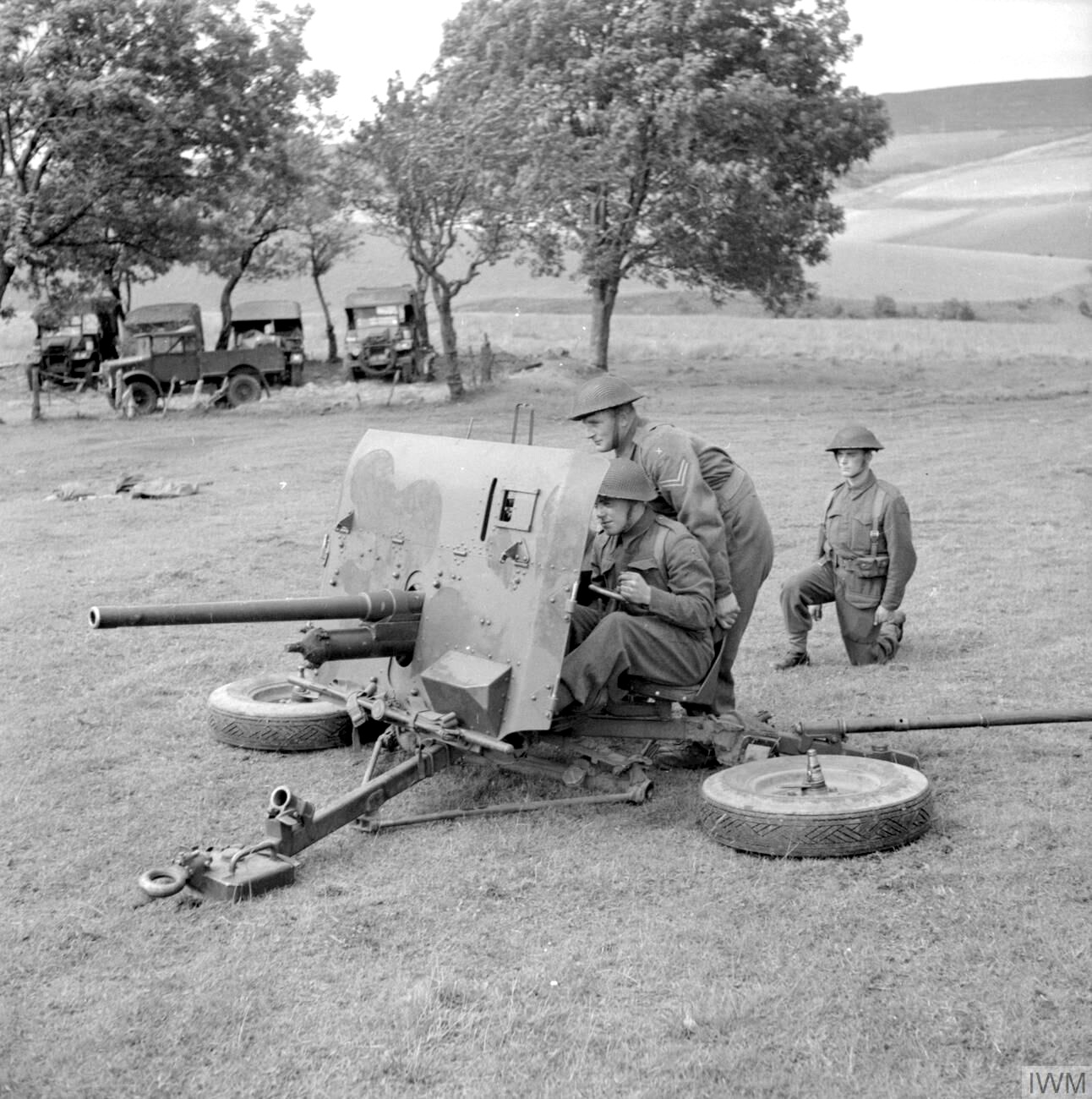
Training with a 2-pounder A/T gun in the UK, 1942.

This time there was no sudden order to join the front line actions soon as war broke out, and the regiment was detailed to perform home defence duties. Having initially trained in Southern Command, 61st Division was sent to Northern Ireland in June 1940 during the post-Dunkirk invasion crisis. Soon after arrival 63rd A/T Rgt transferred to 53rd (Welsh) Infantry Division. For a while it came under Northern Ireland District, then reverted to 53rd (W) Division on 12 April 1941. Shortly afterwards 53rd (W) Division returned to mainland Britain and 63rd A/T Rgt rejoined 61st Division on 21 June.

On 27 September 1941, 251 A/T Bty was detached from the regiment and sent to Butlin's Camp Clacton-on-Sea to help form a new 85th A/T Rgt (see below). It was replaced on 1 October by a new 301 A/T Bty formed by a cadre within the regiment while it was stationed at Portrush, County Antrim. On 28 July 1942 301 A/T Bty also left the regiment to help form a new 97th A/T Rgt in Northumberland.

When TA duplicate regiments were authorised to adopt their parent unit's subtitles on 17 February 1942, the 63rd A/T Rgt was officially designated 'Worcestershire and Oxfordshire Yeomanry', which took no account of the separation of the Worcester and Oxford batteries in 1939. The regiment simply referred to itself as 63rd (Oxfordshire Yeomanry) Anti-Tank Regiment, RA.

61st Division remained in Northern Ireland until February 1943. On 25 June, while the regiment was stationed at Ackergill, near Wick in Caithness, Scotland, it absorbed the personnel of the disbanding 307 Independent A/T Bty and formed a new 251 A/T Bty to replace the one lost at Singapore.

By the summer of 1943 21st Army Group was being assembled for the planned Allied invasion of Normandy (Operation Overlord). 61st Division did appear in the Army Group's proposed order of battle, but it was later replaced by veteran formations brought back from the Mediterranean theatre before Overlord was launched. It remained in reserve in the UK at full establishment until it reorganised as a light division in August 1945.

Churchill then influenced the QOOH's history again. When the regiment saw others leave for the D-Day landings, they were anxious to join the action. However, Winston Churchill, though now Prime Minister, was still Honorary Colonel of the QOOH, and in 1944 it was decided to make a personal appeal to him in the spirit of his famous intervention of 1914. Colonel John Thomson arranged to send this request via Frederick Smith, 2nd Earl of Birkenhead, Churchill's godson and a former QOOH officer. The effect was dramatic. By October 1944 the QOOH found themselves dispatched to France on the personal orders of the Prime Minister.

==== North West Europe ====
On arrival the regiment was assigned to VIII Corps, which already had a corps A/T regiment, 91st (Argyll & Sutherland Highlanders) A/T Rgt, which had seen several weeks of action.

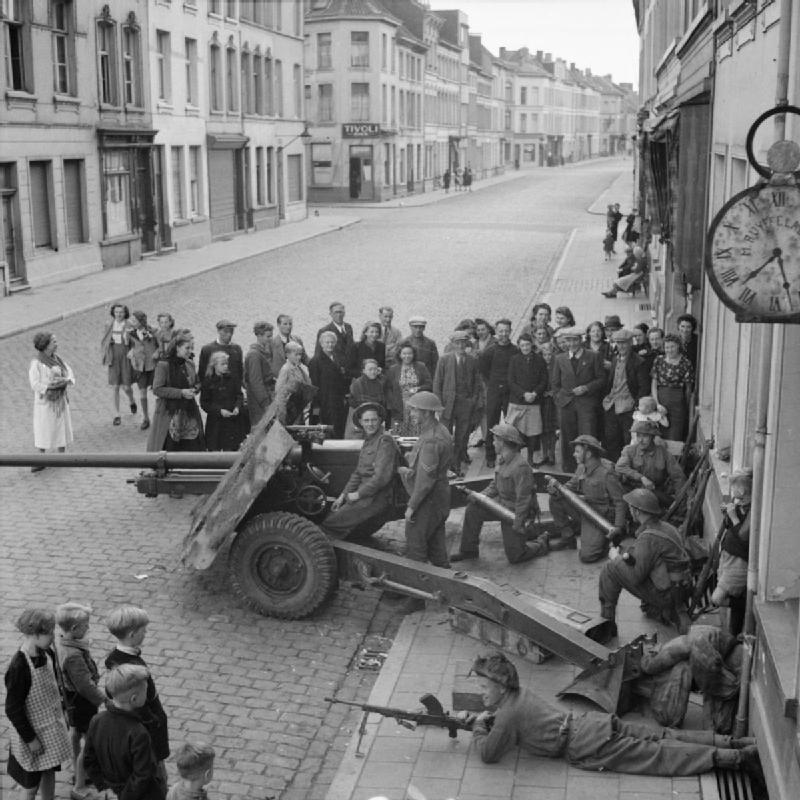
Liberated Belgian civilians crowd round a 17-pdr A/T gun deployed on the streets, 1944'

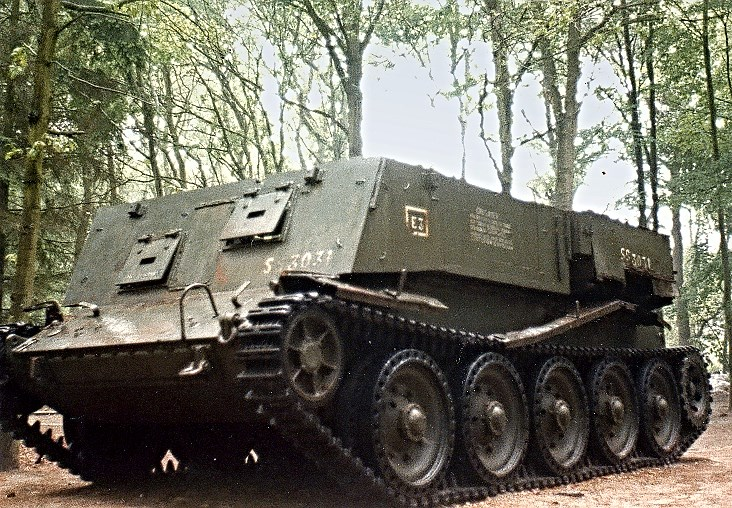
A Crusader gun tractor.

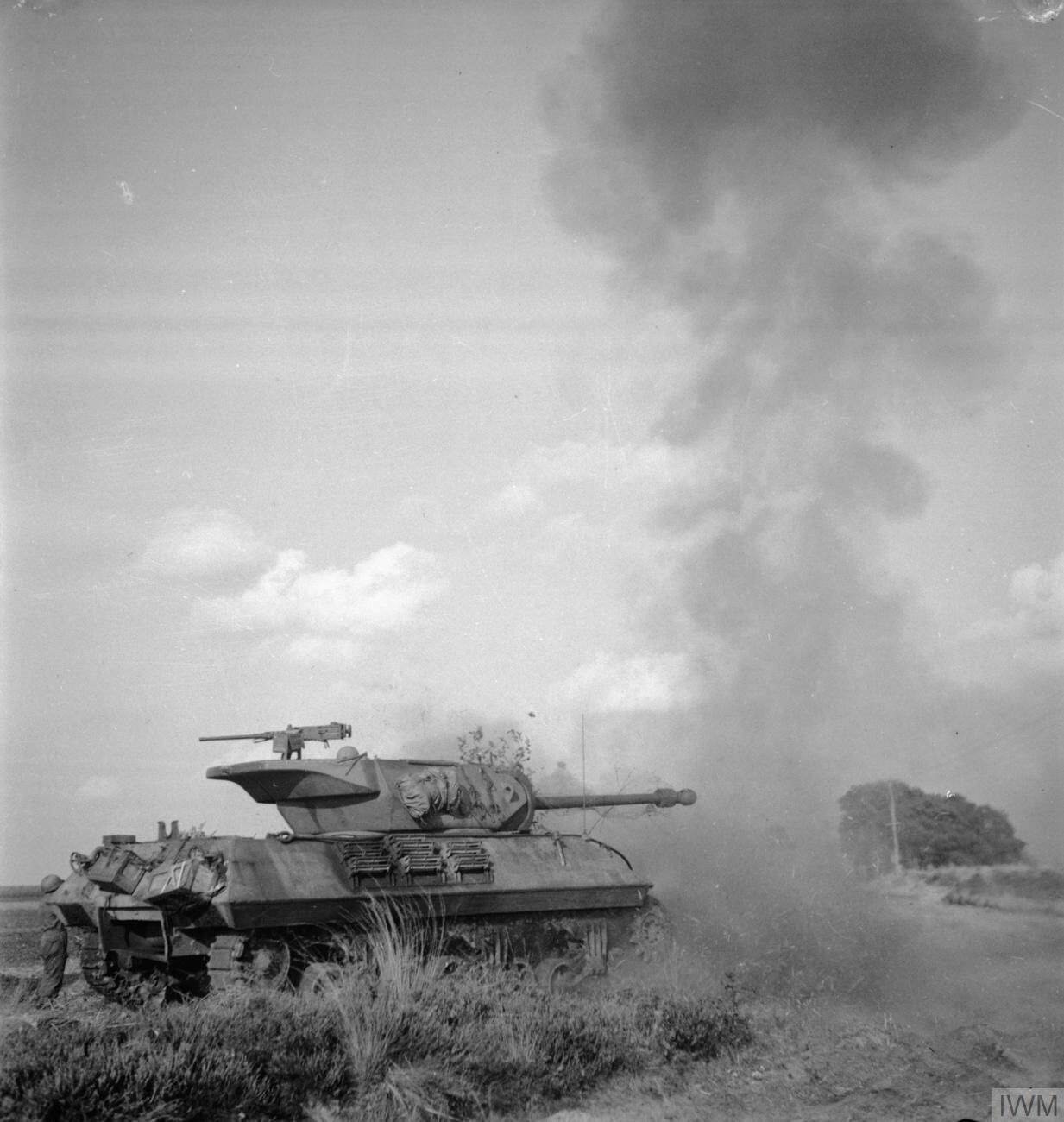
A 17-pdr armed Achilles firing in Germany in October 1944.

By 1944 the batteries of infantry divisional A/T regiments such as 63rd A/T Rgt consisted of one troop of 6-pounders and two troops of 17-pounders but corps A/T regiments were fully equipped with 17-pounders, two batteries towed by Crusader tanks converted into gun tractors, and two self-propelled (SP) batteries with M10 tank destroyers mounting 17-pdrs known as 'Achilles'.

In early October VIII Corps launched Operation Constellation to clear the remaining German forces from west of the River Maas. Progress was slow and the fighting was bitter, and late in the month German counter-attack nearly wiped out the gains. By then 21st Army Group had shifted its limited resources. In November the corps participated in Operation Nutcracker, in miserable winter conditions, to complete the clearance of the west bank of the Maas, finishing the job by taking the last bridgehead at Blerick (Operation Guildford) in December.

On 6 December 251 and 252 batteries of 63rd A/T Rgt exchanged personnel with 144 and 146, the two SP batteries of the more experienced 91st (A&SH) A/T Rgt, and thereafter the regiment dropped its 'Oxfordshire Yeomanry' subtitle.

VIII Corps spent the winter of 1944–45 holding the line linking First Canadian Army with the rest of British Second Army. By late March 1945 21st Army Group was ready to carry out an assault crossing of the Rhine (Operation Plunder). VIII Corps was in Second Army's reserve during this operation, earmarked to lead the subsequent breakout. During April the corps drove across Germany, mopping up scattered German forces. On the night of 14/15 April the 2nd Battalion Glasgow Highlanders halted in the village of Stadensen. For security the battalion formed a perimeter camp, enclosing all the transport and supporting arms, including a troop of one of 91st (A&SH) A/T Rgt's SP batteries (to which the QOOH men had been drafted). During the night a battle group of Panzer Division Clausewitz, riding on self-propelled SP guns and armoured half-tracks, crashed into the village and a wild melee followed, lasting until after dawn. When the Germans began to retire the A/T guns of the 91st and the Glasgow Highlanders took a heavy toll of them.

63rd A/T Rgt was one of the units to liberate the Belsen concentration camp on 15 April. On 21 April VIII Corps reached the River Elbe, which required a fullscale assault crossing (Operation Enterprise). This was carried out by 15th (Scottish) Infantry Division on the night of 28 April. After the Elbe there was little opposition, and hostilities were ended on 5 May by the German surrender at Lüneburg Heath.

63rd Anti-Tank Regiment and its batteries served on in British Army of the Rhine carrying out occupation duties until they passed into suspended animation on 18 May 1946.

=== 251 Anti-Tank Battery ===
251 Anti-Tank Battery had been detached from 63rd Anti-Tank Regiment on 27 September 1941, and travelled from Portrush, Northern Ireland to Butlin's Camp, Clacton-on-Sea where it joined three other batteries detached from existing regiments to form the new 85th Anti-Tank Regiment. This was one of a number of regiments being formed in this fashion under War Office control, ready to be shipped to one of the fighting fronts.

On 11 November 1941 the regiment boarded the P&O ocean liner SS Narkunda at Gourock near Greenock, Scotland on the River Clyde as part of "Winston Special" convoy WS 12Z. WS 12Z convoy sailed just before midnight of 12 November (into 13 November). The regiment was headed for Basra, Iraq

Convoy WS 12Z arrived at Freetown, Sierra Leone on 25 November 1941, left Freetown on 28 November 1941 arrived at Durban, South Africa on 18 December 1941.

On 24 December 1941, convoys WS12Z-A (Aden), WS12Z-B (Bombay) and WS12Z-M (Malaya) departed Durban. The SS Narkunda was in Convoy WS12Z-M, headed to reinforce Singapore. On 30 December 1941, USS Mount Vernon joined convoys WS12Z-A, WS12Z-B and WS12Z-M at 0832 (GMT +4). At 1000, USS Mount Vernon, escorted HMS Emerald and WS12Z-M detached and became Convoy DM 1. Convoy DM 1 was headed for the Maldives. There was a fuelling stop at "Port T", Addu Atoll, Maldives on 4 and 5 January 1942. There was no shore leave.

The SS Nakunda reached Keppel Harbour, Singapore on 13 January 1942.

==== Singapore ====
The 85th were transported from the docks to Birdwood Barracks, near Changi. On 14 January 1942 the unit was attached to 11 Indian Brigade and moved some fifty miles north of Birdwood Camp to Jahore Baru and began defence of Singapore. It was called into action the next day in a rubber plantation just north of the Sultan of Jahore's palace which it fought for a week.

On 5 February 1942, the 85th was sent to RAF base at Selatar to guard the base. The next day, the unit evacuated the base and withdrew to the residential district of Mount Pleasant in Singapore City, and, on 13 February 1942, the unit set up defensive positions at Halifax Road.

==== Prisoners of war ====
The rest of the regiment became prisoners of war on 15 February 1942 and were marched to Changi Prison. Later in 1942, the POWs were enslaved and forced to work on the infamous Death Railroad which was completed 17 October 1943. Many died in the camps along the Thai-Burma Railroad (According to the findings of the Tokyo Tribunal, the death rate of Western prisoners was 27.1 per cent). Subsequently, the men continued to be used as slave labour with many more deaths – mainly in Thailand, Singapore, or on a hell ship, but some died in Sumatra, Formosa, China (Hong Kong), Malaysia or Japan.

== Postwar ==
=== Royal Artillery ===
When the TA was reconstituted on 1 January 1947, the QOOH reformed at Oxford. Initially it was to have been a medium artillery regiment, but this was changed to field artillery, as 387 (Queen's Own Oxfordshire Hussars) Field Regiment, RA. The regiment formed part of 43rd (Wessex) Division of the TA.

However, on 19 September 1950 the regiment was amalgamated with 299 (Royal Bucks Yeomanry) Field Rgt, initially as 299/387 Field Rgt, then from 1 July 1951 as 299 (Royal Bucks Yeomanry and Queen's Own Oxfordshire Hussars) Field Regiment, RA, with the QOOH forming Q Battery based in Oxford and Banbury. Further changes occurred in 1956 when the regiment was joined by the Berkshire Yeomanry. On 1 May 1961 part of the Berkshire Yeomanry left, and the regiment absorbed 431 Light Anti-Aircraft Regiment and 143 Anti-Aircraft Control and Reporting Section.

In 1967 the TA was reduced into the Territorial and Army Volunteer Reserve (TAVR) as part of a major cutback in Britain's armed forces and the switch to a defence policy based on the nuclear deterrent. On 1 April Q (QOOH) Battery of 299 Field Rgt became A (QOOH) Company in the Oxfordshire Territorials (a home defence infantry battalion at Oxford) in TAVR III, though some of the Banbury personnel joined 39 (City of London) Signal Regiment, Royal Corps of Signals in TAVR II. TAVR III was disbanded on 1 January 1969 and its united reduced to cadres; the cadre of the Oxfordshire Territorials was disbanded on 1 April 1975.

=== Royal Signals ===
In 1971 the QOOH elements in 39 Signal Rgt became 5 (Banbury) Signal Squadron (Volunteers), changing its designation after the disbandment of the Oxfordshire Territorials' cadre in 1975 to 5 (Queen's Own Oxfordshire Hussars) Signal Squadron to maintain the regiment's traditions.

39 (City of London) Signal Regiment had geographically widespread squadrons performing a 'special communications' role until 1995 when it was reorganised for national communications duties. At the same time it was redesignated 39 (Skinners) Signal Regiment to recognise its links with the Worshipful Company of Skinners.

=== Royal Logistic Corps ===
Following the Army 2020 restructuring, the Queen's Own Oxfordshire Hussars became part of the Royal Logistic Corps (RLC) on 5 April 2014, forming 142 (QOOH) Vehicle Squadron based at Banbury. This operates within 165 Port and Maritime Regiment RLC, whose RHQ is based at Plymouth.

== Heritage and ceremonial ==
=== Honorary colonels ===
The following served as honorary colonel of the regiment and its successor units:

- Henry Barnett, former CO, appointed 10 July 1878
- The Prince of Wales, appointed on 29 July 1896; colonel-in-chief 29 September 1904 after succeeding as King Edward VII
- Arthur Annesley, 11th Viscount Valentia, former CO, appointed 24 September 1904; continued with 100th (W&OY) Field Bde
- Queen Mary, appointed as colonel-in-chief of 100th (W&OY) Field Bde; continued with 63rd (QOOH) A/T Rgt 22 December 1939, and 387 (QOO) Fd Rgt to 1950
- Col A. Dugdale, CMG, DSO, TD, former CO of QOOH, appointed to 100th (W&OY) Field Bde 2 October 1929
- John Lyttelton, 9th Viscount Cobham, TD, former CO of 100th (W&OY) Field Bde, appointed to 53rd (W&)Y) A/T Rgt 2 February 1939
- Winston Churchill, appointed to 63rd (QOOH) A/T Rgt 21 October 1939, continued with 387 (QOOH) Fd Rgt and 299 (RB&QOOH) Fd Rgt

=== Churchill's funeral ===
Sir Winston Churchill remained honorary colonel until the time of his death in 1965. When he left detailed instructions in the safe at the TA Centre, Oxford, for his funeral, he included a special honour for the QOOH. Just as he had sent them to Flanders in 1914 and to France in 1944, so now he singled them out to have a prominent position immediately ahead of his coffin at the state funeral, in preference to many senior and more prestigious regiments. As the huge procession was forming up, a brigade major of the Guards stormed up to the officer commanding the QOOH detachment and told him his men were incorrectly arranged according to accepted protocol.

The OC replied:

"In the Oxfordshire Yeomanry we always do state funerals this way."

=== Uniforms and insignia ===
Prior to World War I the QOOH wore an elaborate hussar style full dress of dark blue with white (silver for officers) braiding. The busby bag, plume and trousers were in mantua purple. This distinctive colour was unique to the regiment, and was retained for the collar, cuffs, trouser stripes and hat band for officers' No 1 uniform and mess uniform even after conversion to artillery. The officers also continued wear cavalry shoulder chains.

The two Oxfordshire batteries of the 100th (Worcestershire and Oxfordshire Yeomanry) Field Brigade continued to wear the QOOH cap badge, and this was carried on by the 63rd (Oxfordshire Hussars) A/T Regiment and 387 (QOOH) Field Regiment. In battledress the usual embroidered 'ROYAL ARTILLERY' shoulder title was worn, but with a white metal 'QOOH' worn on the shoulder strap.

After conversion to Royal Signals the QOOH initially wore a maroon (Mantua purple) slider on the shoulder, but this was replaced by a green epaulette, on which officers wore white embroidered rank insignia and the letters QOOH, while other ranks had QOOH embroidered in black. The squadron adopted the QOOH cap badge in place of the Royal Signals badge in 1997.

=== Honours ===
The regiment was awarded the following Battle honours (Honours in bold are those selected to be emblazoned on the regimental guidon):

- Second Boer War: **South Africa 1900–1901**
- World War I: **Messines 1914**, **Armentières 1914**, **Ypres 1915**, St Julien, Bellewaarde,**Arras 1917**, Scarpe 1917, **Cambrai 1917 '18**, **Somme 1918**, St Quentin, **Lys**, Hazebrouck, **Amiens**, Bapaume 1918, **Hindenburg Line**, Canal du Nord, Selle, Sambre, **France and Flanders 1914–18**
- World War II: No battle honours were awarded; it is tradition that the Royal Artillery does not carry battle honours: instead the guns are regarded as the colours, and the regiment bears the motto Ubique ('everywhere').

In 1998 5 (QOOH) Signal Sqn celebrated the Oxfordshire Yeomanry's bicentenary by being granted the Freedom of Banbury.

=== Memorials ===
There are World War I memorials to the QOOH on a pillar in Christ Church Cathedral, Oxford, and on the wall of the first floor landing of Oxford Town Hall, both buildings being on St Aldates Street in Oxford.

=== Regimental museum ===
The Soldiers of Oxfordshire Museum is based at Woodstock, Oxfordshire.

== See also ==
- Imperial Yeomanry
- List of Yeomanry Regiments 1908
- Yeomanry
- Yeomanry order of precedence
- British yeomanry during the First World War
- Second line yeomanry regiments of the British Army
- List of British Army Yeomanry Regiments converted to Royal Artillery

== Bibliography ==
- L.S. Amery (ed), The Times History of the War in South Africa 1899–1902, London: Sampson Low, Marston, 6 Vols 1900–09.
- Maj A.F. Becke,History of the Great War: Order of Battle of Divisions, Part 1: The Regular British Divisions, London: HM Stationery Office, 1934/Uckfield: Naval & Military Press, 2007, ISBN 1-847347-38-X.
- Maj A.F. Becke,History of the Great War: Order of Battle of Divisions, Part 2a: The Territorial Force Mounted Divisions and the 1st-Line Territorial Force Divisions (42–56), London: HM Stationery Office, 1935/Uckfield: Naval & Military Press, 2007, ISBN 1-847347-39-8.
- Maj A.F. Becke,History of the Great War: Order of Battle of Divisions, Part 2b: The 2nd-Line Territorial Force Divisions (57th–69th), with the Home-Service Divisions (71st–73rd) and 74th and 75th Divisions, London: HM Stationery Office, 1937/Uckfield: Naval & Military Press, 2007, ISBN 1-847347-39-8.
- Maj A.F. Becke,History of the Great War: Order of Battle of Divisions, Part 3b: New Army Divisions (30–41) and 63rd (R.N.) Division, London: HM Stationery Office, 1939/Uckfield: Naval & Military Press, 2007, ISBN 1-847347-41-X.
- John Buckley, Monty's Men: The British Army and the Liberation of Europe, London: Yale University Press, 2013, ISBN 978-0-300-13449-0.
- Col John K. Dunlop, The Development of the British Army 1899–1914, London: Methuen, 1938.
- Brig-Gen Sir James E. Edmonds, History of the Great War: Military Operations, France and Belgium, 1914, Vol I, 3rd Edn, London: Macmillan,1933/Woking: Shearer, 1986, ISBN 0-946998-01-9/Uckfield: Naval & Military Press, 2021, ISBN 978-1-78331-611-3
- Brig-Gen Sir James E. Edmonds, History of the Great War: Military Operations, France and Belgium, 1914, Vol II, London: Macmillan, 1925/Imperial War Museum & Battery Press, 1995, ISBN 1-870423-55-0/Uckfield: Naval & Military Press, 2021, ISBN 978-1-78331-612-0.
- Brig-Gen Sir James E. Edmonds, History of the Great War: Military Operations, France and Belgium 1918, Vol I, The German March Offensive and its Preliminaries, London: Macmillan, 1935/Imperial War Museum and Battery Press, 1995, ISBN 0-89839-219-5/Uckfield: Naval & Military Press, 2009, ISBN 978-1-84574-725-1.
- Brig-Gen Sir James E. Edmonds, History of the Great War: Military Operations, France and Belgium 1918, Vol II, March–April: Continuation of the German Offensives, London: Macmillan, 1937/Imperial War Museum and Battery Press, 1995, ISBN 1-87042394-1/Uckfield: Naval & Military Press, 2009, ISBN 978-1-84574-726-8.
- Brig-Gen Sir James E. Edmonds, History of the Great War: Military Operations, France and Belgium 1918, Vol III, May–July: The German Diversion Offensives and the First Allied Counter-Offensive, London: Macmillan, 1939/Imperial War Museum and Battery Press, 1994, ISBN 0-89839-211-X/Uckfield: Naval & Military Press, 2009, ISBN 978-1-84574-727-5.
- Brig-Gen Sir James E. Edmonds, History of the Great War: Military Operations, France and Belgium 1918, Vol IV, 8th August–26th September: The Franco-British Offensive, London: Macmillan, 1939/Uckfield: Imperial War Museum and Naval & Military, 2009, ISBN 978-1-845747-28-2.
- Brig-Gen Sir James E. Edmonds & Lt-Col R. Maxwell-Hyslop, History of the Great War: Military Operations, France and Belgium 1918, Vol V, 26th September–11th November, The Advance to Victory, London: HM Stationery Office, 1947/Imperial War Museum and Battery Press, 1993, ISBN 1-870423-06-2/Uckfield: Naval & Military Press, 2021, ISBN 978-1-78331-624-3.
- Maj L.F. Ellis, History of the Second World War, United Kingdom Military Series: Victory in the West, Vol II: The Defeat of Germany, London: HM Stationery Office, 1968/Uckfield: Naval & Military, 2004, ISBN 1-845740-59-9.
- Gen Sir Martin Farndale, History of the Royal Regiment of Artillery: The Years of Defeat: Europe and North Africa, 1939–1941, Woolwich: Royal Artillery Institution, 1988/London: Brasseys, 1996, ISBN 1-85753-080-2.
- Gen Sir Martin Farndale, History of the Royal Regiment of Artillery: The Far East Theatre 1939–1946, London: Brasseys, 2002, ISBN 1-85753-302-X.
- J.B.M. Frederick, Lineage Book of British Land Forces 1660–1978, Vol I, Wakefield, Microform Academic, 1984, ISBN 1-85117-007-3.
- J.B.M. Frederick, Lineage Book of British Land Forces 1660–1978, Vol II, Wakefield: Microform Academic, 1984, ISBN 1-85117-009-X.
- Brig E.A. James, British Regiments 1914–18, London: Samson Books, 1978, ISBN 0-906304-03-2/Uckfield: Naval & Military Press, 2001, ISBN 978-1-84342-197-9.
- Lt-Col H.F. Joslen, Orders of Battle, United Kingdom and Colonial Formations and Units in the Second World War, 1939–1945, London: HM Stationery Office, 1960/London: London Stamp Exchange, 1990, ISBN 0-948130-03-2/ Uckfield: Naval & Military Press, 2003, ISBN 1-843424-74-6.
- Norman E.H. Litchfield, The Territorial Artillery 1908–1988 (Their Lineage, Uniforms and Badges), Nottingham: Sherwood Press, 1992, ISBN 0-9508205-2-0.
- Cliff Lord & Graham Watson, Royal Corps of Signals: Unit Histories of the Corps (1920–2001) and its Antecedents, Solihull: Helion, 2003, ISBN 1-874622-92-2.
- Lt-Gen H.G. Martin, The History of the Fifteenth Scottish Division 1939–1945, Edinburgh: Blackwood, 1948/Uckfield: Naval & Military Press, 2014, ISBN 978-1-78331-085-2.
- Mileham, Patrick (1994). The Yeomanry Regiments; 200 Years of Tradition. Edinburgh: Canongate Academic. ISBN 1-898410-36-4.
- Stephen M. Miller, Lord Methuen and the British Army: Failure and Redemption in South Africa, London: Frank Cass, 1999, ISBN 0-7146-4460-9.
- Perry, FW (1993). Order of Battle of Divisions Part 5B. Indian Army Divisions. Newport: Ray Westlake Military Books. ISBN 1-871167-23-X.
- Rinaldi, Richard A (2008). Order of Battle of the British Army 1914. Ravi Rikhye. ISBN 978-0-97760728-0.
- Col H.C.B. Rogers, The Mounted Troops of the British Army 1066–1945, London: Seeley Service, 1959.
- Arthur Sleigh, The Royal Militia and Yeomanry Cavalry Army List, April 1850, London: British Army Despatch Press, 1850/Uckfield: Naval and Military Press, 1991, ISBN 978-1-84342-410-9.
- Edward M. Spiers, The Army and Society 1815–1914, London: Longmans, 1980, ISBN 0-582-48565-7.
- War Office, A List of the Officers of the Militia, the Gentlemen & Yeomanry Cavalry, and Volunteer Infantry of the United Kingdom, 11th Edn, London: War Office, 14 October 1805/Uckfield: Naval and Military Press, 2005, ISBN 978-1-84574-207-2.
- War Office, Titles and Designations of Formations and Units of the Territorial Army, London: War Office, 7 November 1927 (RA sections also summarised in Litchfield, Appendix IV).

=== External links ===
- Chris Baker, The Long, Long Trail* British Army units from 1945 on
- The Drill Hall Project
- Imperial War Museum, War Memorials Register
- Land Forces of Britain, the Empire and Commonwealth – Regiments.org (archive site)
- The Royal Artillery 1939–1945
- Graham Watson, The Territorial Army 1947
