= Sir James Graham, 1st Baronet, of Netherby =

British Tory politician

Sir James Graham Bt

Member of Parliament for Ripon
- In office 27 October 1798 – 22 June 1807 Serving with John Heathcote, The Lord Headley
- Preceded by: William Lawrence; John Heathcote
- Succeeded by: Hon. F. J. Robinson, George Gipps

Personal details
- Born: April 1761
- Died: 3 April 1824 (aged 62–63)
- Party: Tory
- Spouse: Lady Catherine Stewart (m. 1781)
- Children: Sir James Graham, 2nd Baronet

Sir James Graham, 1st Baronet (April 1761 – 13 April 1824) was a British Tory politician.

== Early life ==
James was born in April 1761. He was a son of the Rev. Robert Graham and wife Frances Graham (daughter of Sir Reginald Graham, 4th Baronet of Norton Conyers). Among his siblings was Margaret Graham (wife of Fergus Francis Holmes), Catherine Graham (wife of Thomas Garforth), and younger brother Fergus Graham. He had an elder brother, Charles, who predeceased their father leaving only a daughter, who married John Webb Wetson.

His paternal grandfather was the Very Rev. William Graham, fourth son of the Sir George Graham, 2nd Baronet of Esk. His uncle, Charles Graham, was the father of the Rev. Sir William Graham, 6th Baronet of Esk.

== Career ==
He was created Baronet of Netherby in the County of Cumberland in the Baronetage of Great Britain on 15 January 1783. He later represented Ripon in the House of Commons.

== Personal life ==
On 28 September 1781 Graham married Lady Catherine Stewart, the eldest of sixteen children of John Stewart, 7th Earl of Galloway and the former Anne Dashwood. Among her siblings were George Stewart, 8th Earl of Galloway, William Stewart, Susan Spencer-Churchill, Duchess of Marlborough, Bishop Charles Stewart, Edward Stewart, James Stewart. Together, they were the parents of:

- Sir James Graham, 2nd Baronet (1792–1861), a prominent statesman who served under Lord John Russell as Home Secretary from 1841 to 1846.
- Caroline Graham (1793–1870), who married Sir Wilfrid Lawson, 1st Baronet, of Brayton.
- George Graham, who married Maria Hassell, youngest daughter of Edward Hassell, Esq.
- Elizabeth Anne Graham, who married The Rev. William Waddilove, only surviving son of Darley Waddilove, the Dean of Ripon.
- Charlotte Graham (d. 1873), who married Sir George Musgrave, 10th Baronet.
- Harriet Anne Graham, who married Capt. Frederick Madan of the Royal Navy.

Sir James died on 1824. His widow died on 20 September 1836.

Parliament of the United Kingdom
| Preceded by William Lawrence; John Heathcote | Member of Parliament for Ripon; 1798–1807; With: John Heathcote (1798–1806); The Lord Headley (1806–1807) | Succeeded by Hon. F. J. Robinson; George Gipps |
Baronetage of the United Kingdom
| New creation | Baronet (of Netherby); 1783–1824 | Succeeded by James Robert George Graham |
