= Charles Henry Churchill =

British Army officer, diplomat and writer (1807–1869)

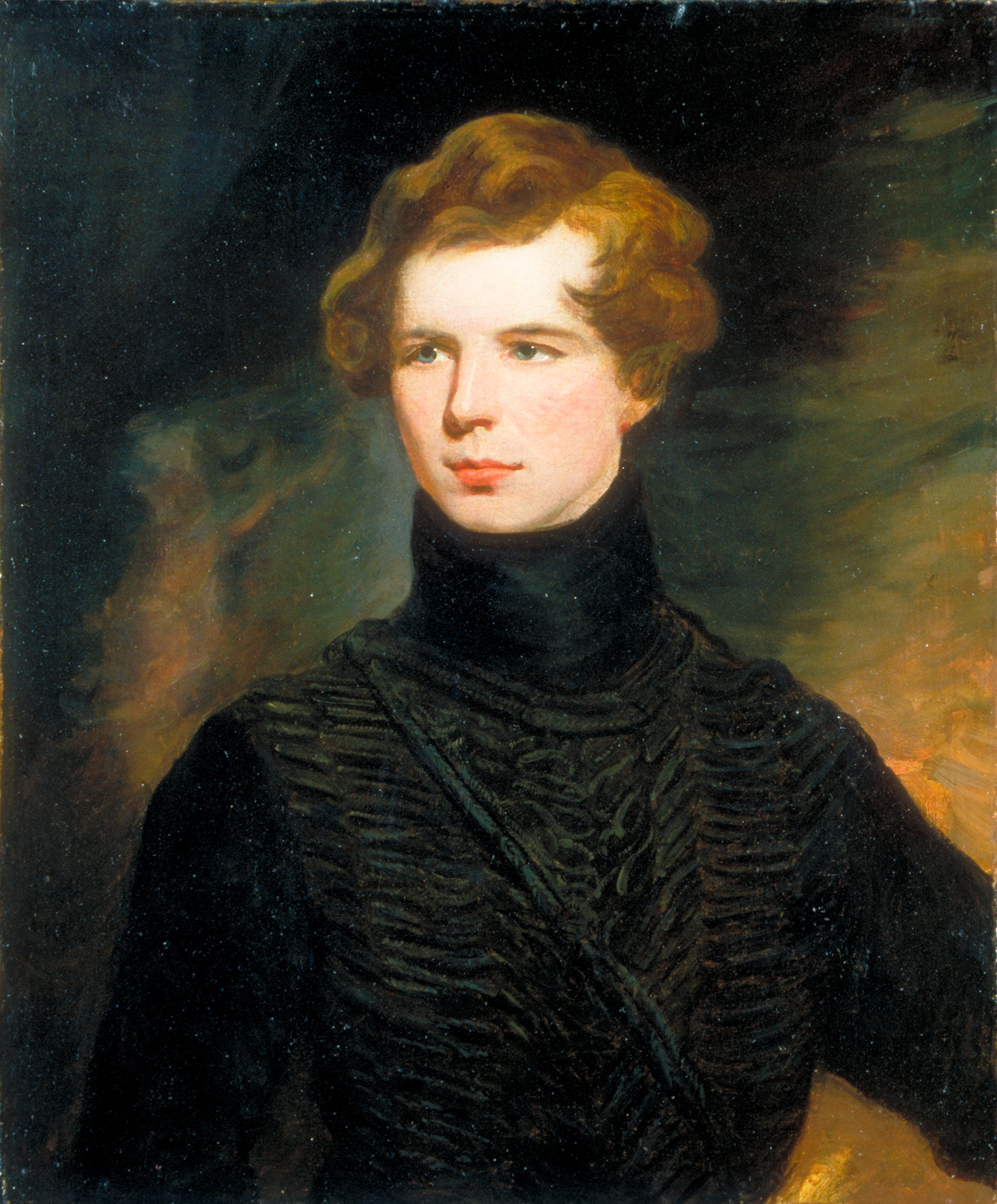
c. 1830 portrait of Churchill

Colonel Charles Henry Churchill (1807 – 1869) was a British Army officer, diplomat and writer who served as a British consul in Ottoman Syria. Churchill was one of the first individuals to draw up political plans for the creation of a Zionist state in the region of Palestine, then part of the Ottoman Empire.

== British Consul in Ottoman Syria ==
In the early 1840s, as British consul in Damascus responsible for Ottoman Syria (including today's Lebanon, Israel and Palestine) under Lord Palmerston's Foreign Office, he proposed the first political plan to create a Jewish State (Israel) in Palestine.

The proposal correspondence with Sir Moses Montefiore, the President of the Board of Deputies of British Jews, in which Churchill proposed a strategy for the creating of a Jewish state, pre-dating formal Zionism by approximately half a century. The correspondence came in the wake of the Oriental Crisis of 1840, the Damascus affair of 1840 and the acceleration of the Eastern Question by the successful Greek War of Independence against Ottoman rule which had concluded ten years earlier.

On 14 June 1841, Churchill wrote to Montefiore:

I cannot conceal from you my most anxious desire to see your countrymen endeavour once more to resume their existence as a people.

I consider the object to be perfectly attainable. But, two things are indispensably necessary. Firstly, that the Jews will themselves take up the matter universally and unanimously. Secondly, that the European Powers will aid them in their views. It is for the Jews to make a commencement. Let the principal persons of their community place themselves at the head of the movement. Let them meet, concert and petition. In fact the agitation must be simultaneous throughout Europe. There is no Government which can possibly take offence at such public meetings. The result would be that you would conjure up a new element in Eastern diplomacy — an element which under such auspices as those of the wealthy and influential members of the Jewish community could not fail not only of attracting great attention and of exciting extraordinary interest, but also of producing great events.

Were the resources which you all possess steadily directed towards the regeneration of Syria and Palestine, there cannot be a doubt but that, under the blessing of the Most High, those countries would amply repay the undertaking, and that you would end by obtaining the sovereignty of at least Palestine.

Syria and Palestine, in a word, must be taken under European protection and governed in the sense and according to the spirit of European administration.

It must ultimately come to this. What a great advantage it would be, nay, how indispensably necessary, when at length the Eastern Question comes to be argued and debated with this new ray of light thrown around it, for the Jews to be ready and prepared to say: "Behold us here all waiting, burning to return to that land which you seek to remould and regenerate. Already we feel ourselves a people. The sentiment has gone forth amongst us and has been agitated and has become to us a second nature; that Palestine demands back again her sons. We only ask a summons from these Powers on whose counsels the fate of the East depends to enter upon the glorious task of rescuing our beloved country from the withering influence of centuries of desolation and of crowning her plains and valleys and mountain-tops once more, with all the beauty and freshness and abundance of her pristine greatness."

I say it is for the Jews to be ready against such a crisis in diplomacy. I therefore would strenuously urge this subject upon your calm consideration, upon the consideration of those who, by their position and influence amongst you are most likely to take the lead in such a glorious struggle for national existence.

I had once intended to have addressed the Jews here in their Synagogue upon the subject, but I have reflected that such a proceeding might have awakened the jealousy of the local Government. I have, however, prepared a rough petition which will be signed by all the Jews here and in other parts of Syria, and which I shall then forward to you. Probably two or three months will elapse first. There are many considerations to be weighed and examined as the question develops itself — but a beginning must be made — a resolution must be taken, an agitation must be commenced, and where the stake is "Country and Home" where is the heart that will not leap and bound to the appeal?

Supposing that you and your colleagues should at once and earnestly interest yourselves upon this important subject of the recovery of your ancient country, it appears to me (forming my opinions upon the present attitude of affairs in the Turkish Empire) that it could only be as subjects of the Porte that you could commence to regain a footing in Palestine.

Your first object would be to interest the Five Great Powers in your views and to get them to advocate your view with the Sultan upon the clear understanding that the Jews, if permitted to colonise any part of Syria and Palestine, should be under the protection of the Great Powers, that they should have the internal regulation of their own affairs, that they should be exempt from military sendee (except on their own account as a measure of defence against the incursions of the Bedouin Arabs), and that they should only be called upon to pay a tribute to the Porte on the usual mode of taxation.

I humbly venture to give my opinion upon a subject, which no doubt has already occupied your thought — and the bare mention of which, I know, makes every Jewish heart vibrate. The only question is — when and how.

The blessing of the Most High must be invoked on the endeavour. Political events seem to warrant the conclusion that the hour is nigh at hand when the Jewish people may justly and with every reasonable prospect of success put their hands to the glorious work of National Regeneration.

If you think otherwise I shall bend at once to your decision, only begging you to appreciate my motive, which is simply an ardent desire for the welfare and prosperity of a people to whom we all owe our possession of those blessed truths which direct our minds with unerring faith to the enjoyment of another and better world.

On 15 August 1842, he delivered the formal "Proposal of Colonel Churchill" to Montefiore – extract below:

Human efforts preceded by prayer and undertaken in faith the whole history of your nation shows to be almost invariably blessed. If such then be your conviction it remains for you to consider whether you may not in all humility, but with earnest sincerity and confiding hope direct your most strenuous attention towards the land of your Fathers with the view of doing all in your power to ameliorate the conditions of your brethren now residing there and with heartfelt aspiration of being approved by Almighty God whilst you endeavour as much as in you lies to render that Land once more a refuge and resting-place to such of your brethren scattered throughout the world as may resort to it.

Hundreds and thousands of your countrymen would strain every effort to accomplish the means of living amidst those scenes rendered sacred by ancient recollections, and which they regard with final affection, but the dread of the insecurity of life and property which has rested so long upon the soil of "Judea" has hitherto been a bar to the accomplishment of their natural desire.

My proposition is that the Jews of England conjointly with their brethren on the Continent of Europe should make an application to the British Government through the Earl of Aberdeen to accredit and send out a fit and proper person to reside in Syria for the sole and express purpose of superintending and watching over the interests of the Jews residing in that country.

The duties and powers of such a public officer to be a matter of arrangement between the Secretary of State for Foreign Affairs and the Committee of Jews conducting the negotiations. It is, I hope, superfluous for me to enlarge upon the incalculable benefit which would accrue to your nation at large were such an important measure to be accomplished, or to allude more than briefly to the spirit of confidence and revival which would be excited in the breasts of your fellow-countrymen all over the world were they to be held and acknowledged agents for the Jewish people resident in Syria and Palestine under the auspices and sanction of Great Britain.

== Family connections ==
Charles Henry Churchill should not be confused with Charles Henry Spencer-Churchill, who was the eldest son of Lord Charles Spencer-Churchill and a grandson of George Spencer-Churchill, 5th Duke of Marlborough. It appears that Charles Henry Churchill was a descendant of General Charles Churchill (1656–1714), who was a brother of John Churchill, 1st Duke of Marlborough.

== Works ==
Churchill wrote several important (cultural) historical works on the Middle East, including a major biography of Abd el-Kader, whom he had met during his exile in Damascus.

- Mount Lebanon: A Ten Years' Residence from 1842 to 1852, describing the Manners, Customs, and Religion of its Inhabitants with a Full and Correct Account of the Druze religion and Containing Historical Records of the Mountain Tribes from Personal Intercourse with their Chiefs and Other Authentic Sources. – 3 volumes. London: Saunders & Otley, 1853
- The Druzes and the Maronites under the Turkish Rule from 1840 to 1860. – London: Bernard Quaritch, 1862
- Life of Abd el-Kader: Ex-Sultan of the Arabs of Algeria: written and compiled from his own dictation from other Authentic Sources. – London: Chapman and Hall, 1867, 8 volumes
