= Spencer-Churchill =

Coat of arms of the Spencer-Churchill family

Spencer-Churchill is a British double-barrelled surname of a branch of the Spencer family, a British noble family associated with the Marlborough dukedom.

== Notable members ==
- Lord Alan Spencer-Churchill (1825–1873), British Army officer
- Albertha Spencer-Churchill, Duchess of Marlborough (1847–1932), English aristocrat
- Lord Alfred Spencer-Churchill (1824–1893), British politician
- Anne Innes-Ker, Duchess of Roxburghe (née Spencer-Churchill; 1854–1923)
- Lady Araminta Spencer-Churchill (born 2007), equestrian and socialite
- Charles Spencer-Churchill (disambiguation), multiple people
- Clarissa Spencer-Churchill (1920–2021), wife of Anthony Eden
- Sir Winston Spencer Churchill (1874–1965), prime minister of the UK
- Clementine Churchill (1885–1977), life peer and wife of Winston Churchill
- Frances Spencer-Churchill, Duchess of Marlborough (1822–1899), English noblewoman
- George Spencer-Churchill (disambiguation), multiple people
- Gladys Spencer-Churchill, Duchess of Marlborough (1881–1977), French-American socialite
- Lady Henrietta Spencer-Churchill (born 1958), English interior decorator
- Lord Ivor Spencer-Churchill (1898–1956), British peer
- Jane Spencer-Churchill, Duchess of Marlborough (1798–1844)
- James Spencer-Churchill, 12th Duke of Marlborough
- John Spencer-Churchill (disambiguation), multiple people
- Laura Spencer-Churchill, Duchess of Marlborough (1915–1990), British noblewoman and socialite
- Lily Spencer-Churchill, Duchess of Marlborough (1854–1909), American socialite
- Lady Norah Beatrice Henriette Spencer-Churchill (1875–1946), English aristocrat
- Randolph Spencer Churchill (disambiguation), multiple people
- Lady Rosemary Spencer-Churchill (born 1929), maid of honour to Elizabeth II at her coronation
- Rosita Spencer-Churchill, Duchess of Marlborough (born 1943), British artist
- Susan Spencer-Churchill, Duchess of Marlborough (1767–1841)

== Others ==
- Lady Spencer-Churchill College, now part of Oxford Brookes University

== See also ==
- List of people with surname Spencer
- Churchill (surname)
- Churchill (disambiguation)
- Winston Churchill (disambiguation)
