= Graham baronets =

Set index for Shelley baronets

There have been eight baronetcies created for persons with the surname Graham, two in the Baronetage of Nova Scotia, two in the Baronetage of England, one in the Baronetage of Great Britain and three in the Baronetage of the United Kingdom.

- Graham baronets of Braco (1625)
- Graham baronets of Esk (1629)
- Graham baronets of Norton Conyers (1662)
- Graham baronets of Gartmore (1665)
- Graham baronets of Netherby (1783)
- Graham baronets of Kirkstall (1808)
- Graham baronets of Larbert House and Househill (1906)
- Graham baronets of Dromore (1964)
