= Graham baronets of Netherby (1783) =

Escutcheon of the Graham baronets of Netherby

The Graham Baronetcy, of Netherby in the County of Cumberland, was created in the Baronetage of Great Britain on 15 January 1783 for James Graham. He later represented Ripon in the House of Commons. This branch of the Graham family was connected with William Grahme, fourth son of the 2nd Baronet of the Graham baronets of Esk (1629). James Graham was son of Robert Grahme D.D., son of William Grahme.

The second Baronet was a prominent statesman and notably served under Lord John Russell as Home Secretary from 1841 to 1846. The 6th Baronet President of the Country Landowners Association from 1971 to 1973.

== Graham baronets, of Netherby (1783) ==
- Sir James Graham, 1st Baronet (1761–1824)
- Sir James Robert George Graham, 2nd Baronet (1792–1861)
- Sir Frederick Ulric Graham, 3rd Baronet (1820–1888)
- Sir Richard James Graham, 4th Baronet (1859–1932)
- Sir (Frederick) Fergus Graham, 5th Baronet (1893–1978)
- Sir Charles Spencer Richard Graham, 6th Baronet (1919–1997)
- Sir James Fergus Surtees Graham, 7th Baronet (born 1946)

The heir apparent is the present holder's only son Robert Charles Thomas Graham (born 1985).

== Notes ==
Baronetage of Great Britain
Preceded by Whalley-Gardiner baronets	Graham baronets of Netherby; 15 January 1783	Succeeded by Dalling baronets
