= William Whateley =

William Whateley may refer to:

- William Whately (1583–1639), English Puritan cleric and author.
- William Whateley (barrister) (1794–1862), English barrister
