= Charles Spencer =

Charles Spencer may refer to:

== Nobility ==
- Charles Spencer, 3rd Earl of Sunderland (1675–1722), English statesman
- Charles Spencer, 3rd Duke of Marlborough (1706–1758), British soldier and politician
- Lord Charles Spencer (1740–1820), 2nd son of the 3rd Duke of Marlborough
- Charles Spencer, 6th Earl Spencer (1857–1922), British courtier and Liberal politician
- Charles Spencer, 9th Earl Spencer (born 1964), brother of Diana, Princess of Wales

== Sports ==
- Charles Spencer (cricketer) (1903–1941), Welsh cricketer
- Charlie Spencer (1899–1953), England and Newcastle United footballer
- Charles Spencer (American football) (born 1982), American football player
- Tony Mamaluke (born 1977), American professional wrestler a.k.a. Charles John Spencer

== Others ==
- Charles A. Spencer (1813–1881), American scientific pioneer and inventor
- Charles Nichols Spencer (1837–1893), Hawaiian businessman and politician
- Cosens Spencer (1874–1930), known posthumously as Charles Cozens Spencer, British-born Canadian film exhibitor and producer in Australia
- Charles S. Spencer (born 1950), American curator, researcher, and anthropologist
- Charles Spencer (journalist) (born 1955), British journalist and longstanding drama critic of the Daily Telegraph
- Charles Spencer (pianist) (born 1955), English classical pianist and music educator
- Charles Green Spencerr (1837–1890), pioneer aviator who founded the balloon manufacturing company C. G. Spencer & Sons
- Charles Spencer (Neighbours), fictional character on Australian soap Neighbours

== Other uses ==
- Charles H. Spencer hulk, a 1912 steamboat that ran on the Colorado River
- Charles R. Spencer, a 1901 steamboat that ran on the Columbia and Willamette Rivers

== See also ==
- Charles Spencer-Churchill (disambiguation)
