= Christopher Smith (MP, died 1835) =

Christopher Smith (died 20 January 1835) was a London merchant, a Lord Mayor of London and Member of Parliament.

== Life ==
He was born the son of a farmer near Abingdon-on-Thames, then in Berkshire. Having gone up to London to be inoculated against smallpox, he found himself working for a wine merchant who left him the business on his death. Smith's own sons were to continue the business after his own demise.

As a member of the Draper's Company he became London councilman in 1800 and in 1807 was raised to the honour of Aldermen, a rank he held until his death. He was elected a Sheriff of London for 1807–08 and Lord Mayor of London for 1817–18. He was President of St Thomas' Hospital from 1818 to his death.

In 1812 he was elected Member of Parliament (MP) for St Albans, holding the seat until 1818. After being defeated in the election of that year, he was re-elected to the seat in 1820, sitting until 1830.

He married twice and had two sons.

Parliament of the United Kingdom
Preceded by Joseph Thompson Halsey; Daniel Giles	Member of Parliament for St. Albans; 1812–1818; With: Joseph Thompson Halsey 1812–1818; William Tierney Robarts 1818	Succeeded by William Tierney Robarts; Lord Charles Spencer-Churchill
Preceded by Joseph Thompson Halsey; Daniel Giles	Member of Parliament for St. Albans; 1820–1830; With: William Tierney Robarts 1820–1821; Sir Henry Wright-Wilson 1821–1826; John Easthope 1826–1830	Succeeded by Viscount Grimston; Charles Tennant (politician)
Civic offices
Preceded by Sir Matthew Wood, Bt	Lord Mayor of London; 1817–1818	Succeeded by John Atkins
