= Charles Spencer-Churchill =

Charles Spencer-Churchill may refer to:

- Lord Charles Spencer-Churchill (1794–1840), British nobleman
- Charles Henry Spencer-Churchill (1828–1877), British officer
- Charles Spencer-Churchill, 9th Duke of Marlborough (1871–1934)
- James Spencer-Churchill, 12th Duke of Marlborough (born 1955), full name Charles James Spencer-Churchill

== See also ==
- Charles Spencer (disambiguation)
