= Viscount Preston =

Viscount Preston is a title that has been created twice, once in the Peerage of Scotland and once in the Peerage of Ireland. The first creation came in the Peerage of Scotland on 21 May 1681. For more information on this creation, see Graham baronets of Esk (1629). The second creation came in the Peerage of Ireland on 3 October 1760. For more information on this creation, see Earl Ludlow.

== Viscounts Preston (1681) ==
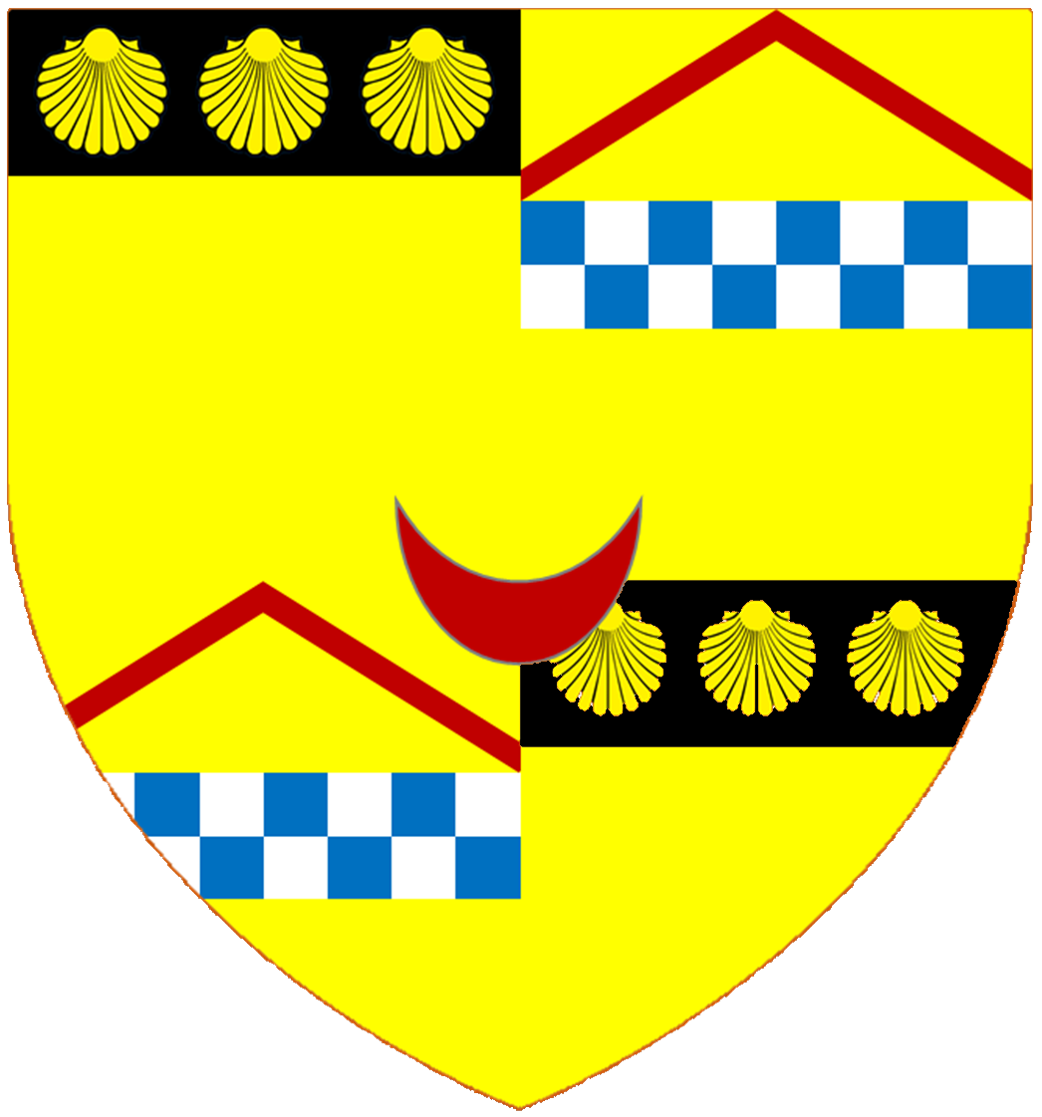
Arms of the Scottish viscounts

- see Graham baronets of Esk (1629)

== Viscounts Preston (1760) ==
- see Earl Ludlow
