= Robert Daniel (disambiguation) =

Robert Daniel (1936–2012) was a Virginia farmer, businessman, teacher, and politician.

Robert Daniel may also refer to:

- Robert Hugh Daniel (1906–1983), chairman and CEO of Daniel International Corporation
- Robert Mackenzie Daniel (1813–1847), Scottish journalist and novelist
- Robert Prentiss Daniel (1902–1968), African-American psychologist, scholar, and college administrator
- Robert Williams Daniel (1884–1940), American banker who survived the sinking of the RMS Titanic

== See also ==
- Robert Daniell (1646–1718)
- Robert Daniels (disambiguation)
