= Robert Daniels =

Robert Daniels may refer to:

- Robert Daniels (boxer) (born 1966), American boxer
- Robert Anthony Daniels (born 1957), Canadian bishop
- Robert Vincent Daniels (1926–2010), American historian and educator
- Bill Daniels (Robert William Daniels Jr., 1920–2000), American cable TV executive and philanthropist

== See also ==
- Robert Daniel (disambiguation)
- Bob Daniels (disambiguation)
