= William Stewart (British Army officer, born 1774) =

British Army officer and politician (1774–1827)

Lieutenant-General The Honourable Sir William Stewart GCB
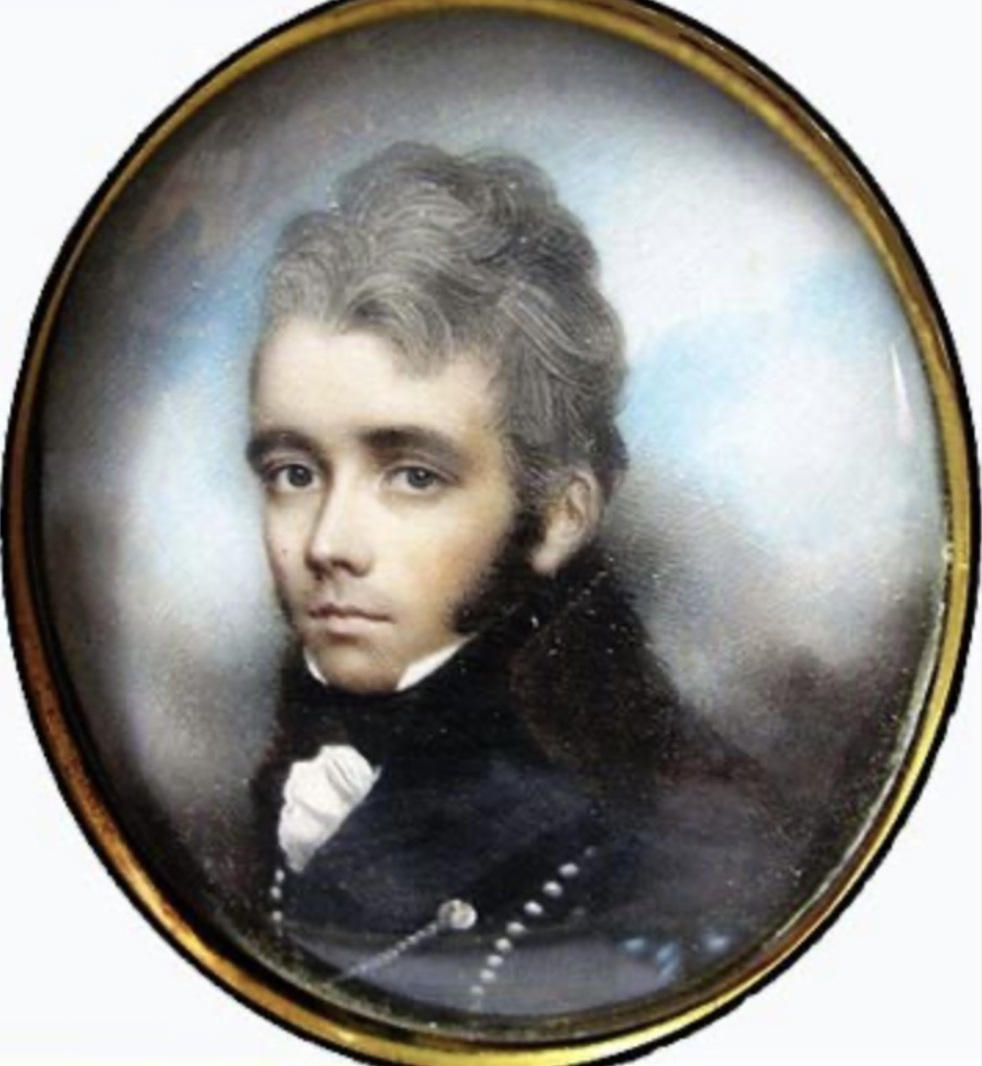
- Portrait of Stewart
- Born: 10 January 1774
- Died: 7 January 1827 (aged 52)
- Military career
- Allegiance: Great Britain; United Kingdom
- Branch: British Army
- Service years: 1786–1827
- Rank: Lieutenant-general
- Units: 42nd (Royal Highland) Regiment of Foot; 67th (South Hampshire) Regiment of Foot
- Commands: 95th Regiment of Foot (Rifles); 2nd Division
- Conflicts: French Revolutionary Wars; Italian and Swiss expedition of 1799; Battle of Copenhagen (1801); Napoleonic Wars; Alexandria expedition of 1807; Walcheren Expedition; Peninsular War; Battle of Albuera; Siege of Burgos; Battle of Vitoria; Battle of the Pyrenees; Battle of the Nive; Battle of Orthez; Battle of Toulouse (1814)
- Awards: Knight Grand Cross of the Order of the Bath

Lieutenant-General Sir William Stewart, GCB (10 January 1774 – 7 January 1827) was a British Army officer and politician who served in the French Revolutionary and Napoleonic Wars. He was the first commanding officer of the 95th Rifles and served as a division commander in the Peninsular War.

== Early life ==
William Stewart was born on 10 January 1774, the fourth son of John Stewart, 7th Earl of Galloway and his second wife Anne, the daughter of Sir James Dashwood, 2nd Baronet. Charles James Stewart, the second Anglican Bishop of Quebec, was his younger brother.

== Political career ==
He represented Saltash in Cornwall from 1795 to 1796, Wigtownshire 1796–1802, the Wigtown Burghs 1803–1805 and Wigtownshire again 1812–1816.

== Early military career ==
Stewart was commissioned into the British Army in 1786 as an ensign in the 42nd (Royal Highland) Regiment of Foot. His first active service was in the Caribbean campaign of 1793–1802, where he was wounded. Stewart served in the 67th (South Hampshire) Regiment of Foot in Saint-Domingue from 1796 to 1798 before returning to Europe where he was given permission to serve with Britain's Austrian and Russian allies in Italy, Swabia and Switzerland during the Italian and Swiss expedition of 1799. Stewart was intensely interested in weapons and tactics. It was probably his observations in 1799 of Tyrolese and Croatian light infantry that did not fight in the rigid formations used by line infantry that led him to propose that the British Army should include a permanent force of light infantry equipped with rifles. His ideas won support from several prominent British officers, including the influential Colonel Coote Manningham, whom Stewart had first met in the West Indies.

In March 1800 the Experimental Corps of Riflemen was raised. On 25 August Stewart commanded the regiment at the Ferrol Expedition, where he was severely wounded in the chest leading his riflemen up the cliffs. In October the Corps was gazetted as a permanent unit, with Manningham as colonel and Stewart as its first lieutenant colonel and commanding officer. Stewart's Standing Orders for the Experimental Corps of Riflemen, demonstrated the high level of his tactical thinking compared to other British officers. He devised and implemented specially adapted forms of drill and manoeuvre, medals for bravery and good conduct, classification in shooting ability, a school and a library for the soldiers, while requiring every regimental officer to get to know each of his men as individuals.

HMS Elephant (first from right), with Stewart onboard, passing the Øresund on 30 March 1801

Shortly after Stewart's 27th birthday he was appointed to command the 895 troops (114 from the Experimental Corps of Riflemen and 781 from the 49th (the Hertfordshire) Regiment of Foot) that served as supplementary marines on the British fleet sent to the Baltic in early 1801. He was stationed on the quarterdeck of Vice-Admiral of the Blue Sir Horatio Nelson's flagship HMS Elephant at the Battle of Copenhagen on 2 April 1801. Nelson reported that "The Honourable Colonel Stewart did me the favour to be aboard the Elephant; and himself, with every officer and soldier under his orders, shared with pleasure the toils and dangers of the day" (Stewart's troops lost 4 killed and 6 wounded).

Stewart was chosen for the honour of carrying to London the despatches reporting the British victory and was included by name in the Thanks of Parliament voted on 16 April 1801. Six days later he received an official letter of promotion to colonel, effective from the day of the Battle of Copenhagen. Nelson wrote to Lord St Vincent praising "Colonel Stewart, who is an excellent and indefatigable young man, and depend upon it, the rising hope of our army". Nelson wrote at least eleven letters to Stewart in the four years between Copenhagen and his death at Trafalgar, which were included in the collection of Stewart's papers privately published as "The Cumloden Papers".

The Experimental Corps of Riflemen was redesignated as the Rifle Corps in 1802 before being renamed the 95th Regiment of Foot (Rifles) in 1803 and together with the 43rd and 52nd Regiments of Foot was formed into the famous Light Brigade commanded by Sir John Moore. Stewart was the first colonel of the 95th, but soon had to hand over its operational command when he was appointed to be a brigadier general. Stewart's heart still lay with the Rifles, and in 1805 he published "Outlines of a Plan for the General Reform of the British Land Forces", which advocated general adoption of many of the innovations he had already made within the 95th.

During the Napoleonic Wars, Stewart served as a senior officer in the Alexandria expedition of 1807 and the Walcheren Expedition in 1809, before being sent to Spain in 1810. Although Stewart was only a major general, he was given the crucial task of commanding the besieged garrison of the vital Spanish port of Cádiz and initially put directly under the orders of General Arthur Wellesley, 1st Viscount Wellington. This led to an appointment to command a brigade in the 2nd Division of the British army in the Iberian Peninsula, and in December 1810 Stewart took over as commander of 2nd Division.

== Division commander under Wellington ==
At the Battle of Albuera on 16 May 1811, Stewart led the 2nd Division, which bore the brunt of a flanking attack by Nicolas Soult. He wheeled Lieutenant-colonel John Colborne's brigade to attack the left flank of Soult's massive French column. At first, the manoeuvre went well as British musket fire decimated the French infantry. Suddenly attacked from flank and rear by Polish lancers and French hussars, three of Colborne's regiments suffered 1,250 casualties. Stewart's other two brigades also suffered severely from point-blank French cannon and musket fire. The survivors of his division held back the French until being rescued by the 4th Division. Glover, historian of the Peninsular War, wrote, "As a battalion commander, Stewart was surpassed only by Moore; as a general he was a menace". Wellington wrote of him, "It is necessary that Stewart should be under the particular charge of somebody". After Albuera, Wellington found that "somebody" in the person of Lieutenant-general Rowland Hill. For the rest of the Peninsular War, Stewart and his 2nd Division usually served under Hill's competent supervision. He fought in Hill's corps in the siege of Burgos in autumn 1812 and at the Battle of Vitoria in 1813.

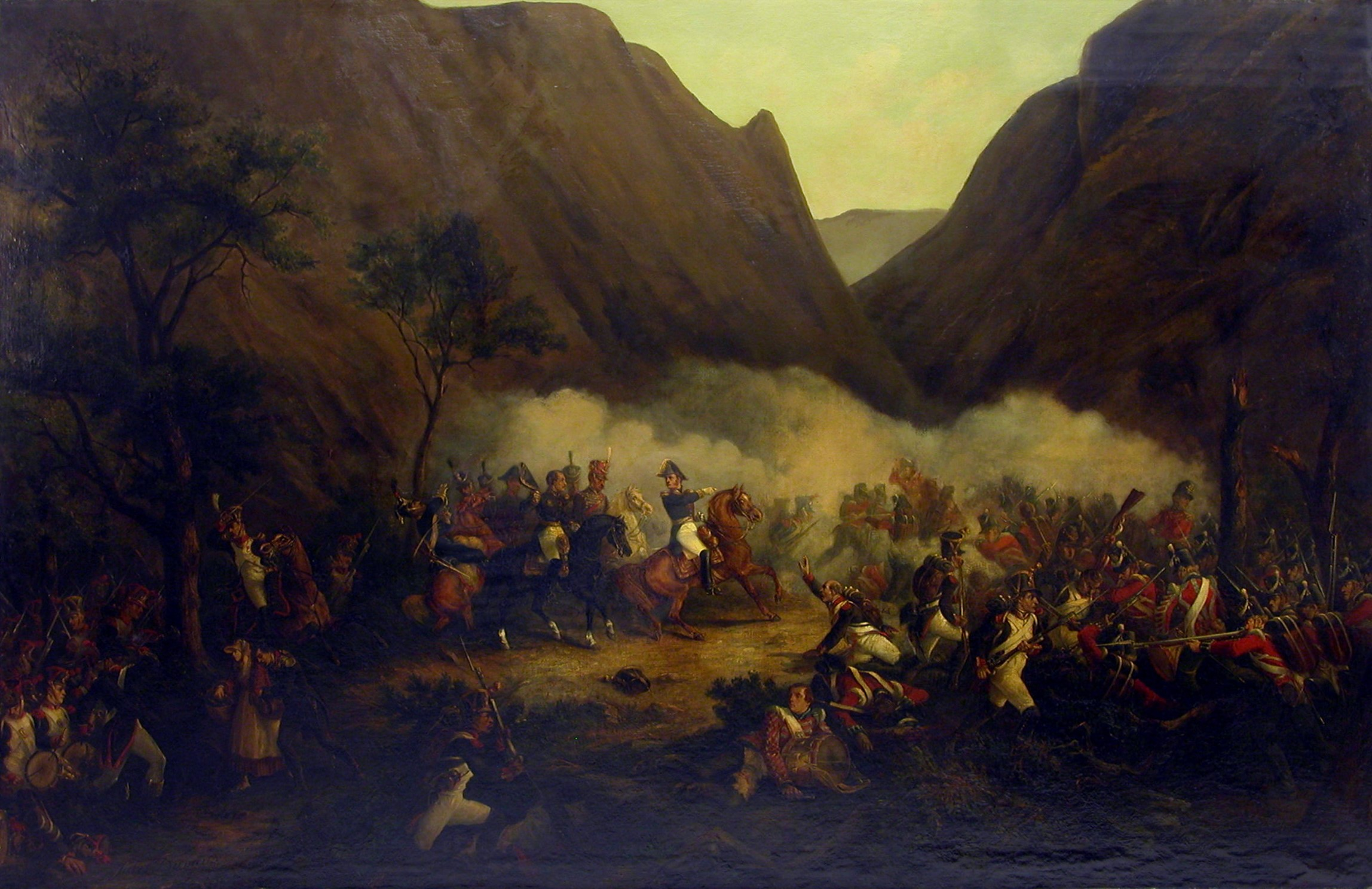
The Battle of Maya, which Stewart fought in

On 15 November 1812, 80,000 French-led troops under Soult confronted 65,000 Anglo-Portuguese troops led by Wellington near Salamanca. When Soult failed to attack, Wellington ordered a withdrawal to Portugal. During the retreat, Stewart (temporarily in charge of the 1st Division) and two other division commanders disobeyed Wellington's orders. Stewart, Wellington wrote, "and certain other generals held a Council of War to decide whether to obey my orders to march by a particular road. He [Stewart], at the head, decided they would not; they marched by a road leading they knew not where, and when I found them in the morning they were in the utmost confusion, not knowing where to go and what to do". On the opening day of the Battle of the Pyrenees at Maya Pass, Stewart concluded that the French would not attack, then rode ten miles to the rear. When the battle began, his 2nd Division was left to fight all morning under an inexperienced brigade commander and suffered 1,347 casualties. Still in Hill's corps, Stewart fought at the battles of the Nive, Orthez and Toulouse during Wellington's campaign in south-west France.

== Awards, thanks and retirement ==
For his services in the Peninsula Stewart received the Gold Cross with two clasps, the Portuguese Order of the Tower and Sword, and the Spanish Order of San Fernando. On 2 January 1815 (on the enlargement of the order of the Bath) he received the G.C.B. Stewart had been M.P. for Saltash in 1795, and for Wigtownshire from 1796 onward, and on 24 June 1814 the speaker thanked him in his place, on behalf of the house, for his share in the victories at Vitoria and Orthez, and in the intermediate operations.

Stewart saw no further service. His health was broken by seventeen campaigns, in which he had received six wounds and four contusions, and in 1816 he resigned his seat in parliament. In July 1818 he was transferred to the colonelcy of the 1st Battalion of what had then become the Rifle Brigade. He settled at Cumloden on the borders of Wigton and Kirkcudbrightshire, near the family seat. He died there on 7 January 1827, and was buried at Minigaff.

== Family ==
In 1804 Stewart married Frances, daughter of the Hon. John Douglas (second son of the Earl of Morton), and he left one son, Horatio, a captain in the Rifle Brigade, and one daughter, Louisa.

== Notes ==
Parliament of Great Britain
Preceded by Viscount Garlies; Edward Bearcroft	Member of Parliament for Saltash; 1795–1796; With: Edward Bearcroft	Succeeded by Edward Bearcroft; The Lord Macdonald
Preceded by Andrew McDouall	Member of Parliament for Wigtownshire; 1796–1800	Succeeded by Parliament of the United Kingdom
Parliament of the United Kingdom
Preceded by Parliament of Great Britain	Member of Parliament for Wigtownshire; 1801–1802	Succeeded by Andrew McDouall
Preceded by John Spalding	Member of Parliament for Wigtown Burghs; 1803–1805	Succeeded by James Graham
Preceded by William Maxwell	Member of Parliament for Wigtownshire; 1812–1816	Succeeded by James Hunter-Blair
Military offices
New regiment	Colonel-Commandant of the 3rd Battalion, 95th Regiment of Foot; 1809–1816	Succeeded by Sir George Walker
Preceded by Sir Brent Spencer	Colonel-Commandant of the 2nd Battalion, Rifle Brigade; 1816–1818	Succeeded by Sir George Walker
Preceded by Sir Brent Spencer	Colonel-Commandant of the 1st Battalion, Rifle Brigade; 1818–1827	Succeeded by Sir Andrew Barnard
