= Anne Stewart, Countess of Galloway =

The Right Honourable The Countess of Galloway
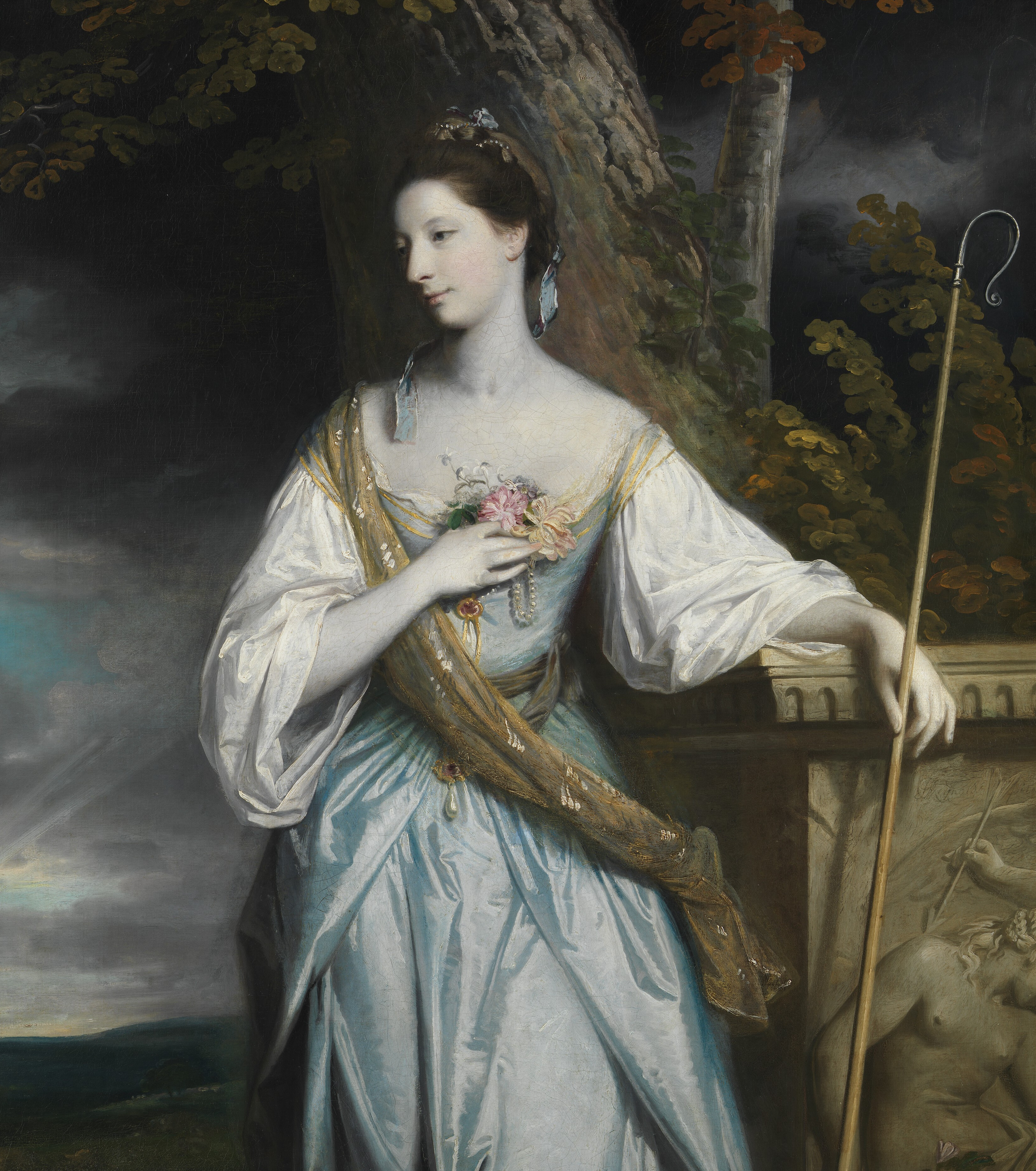
- Portrait by Sir Joshua Reynolds, 1764
- Born: Anne Dashwood; 1743; Kirtlington Park, Oxfordshire
- Died: 8 January 1830 (aged 86–87); Westminster, London
- Children: 16, including George, William, Charles, Edward, James and Susan
- Parent(s): Sir James Dashwood, 2nd Baronet; Elizabeth Spencer

Anne Stewart, Countess of Galloway (née Dashwood; 1743 – 8 January 1830), was the wife of John Stewart, 7th Earl of Galloway.

== Early life ==
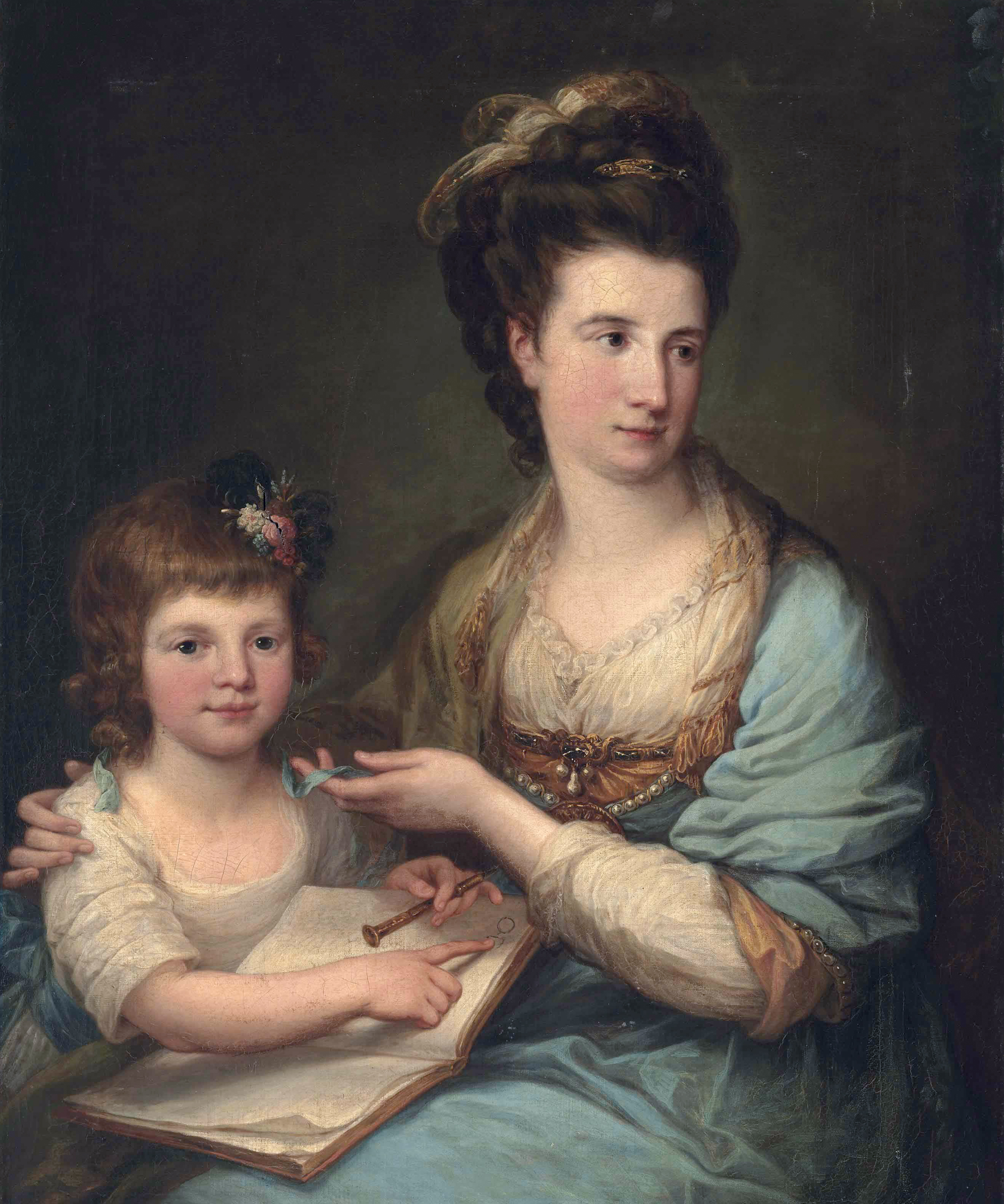
Anne Stewart, née Dashwood, and daughter Susan Stewart, later Duchess of Marlborough (1767–1841) (Angelica Kauffmann)

Anne Dashwood was born at Kirtlington Park, Oxfordshire, the family home of her parents, Sir James Dashwood, 2nd Baronet, and his wife, the former Elizabeth Spencer. Among her siblings was Elizabeth (wife of George Montagu, 4th Duke of Manchester), and Catherine (wife of Lucy Knightley, MP for Northamptonshire).

Her paternal grandparents were Robert Dashwood (son of Sir Robert Dashwood, 1st Baronet) and the former Dorothy Reade (a daughter of Sir James Reade, 2nd Baronet). Her mother was a daughter of Edward Spencer of Rendlesham and sister of Anne Hamilton, Duchess of Hamilton.

== Personal life ==
On 13 June 1764, she married the future earl, when he was an MP and heir to his father's earldom. His first wife, Lady Charlotte Greville, had died in 1763, leaving him with no living children. In the year of their marriage, Sir Joshua Reynolds painted Anne in the guise of a shepherdess; the portrait is now held by the Metropolitan Museum of Art, New York. Together, they were the parents of sixteen children:

- Lady Catherine Stewart (1765–1836), who married Sir James Graham, 1st Baronet.
- Hon. Alexander Stewart (1766–1766), who died young.
- Lady Susan Stewart (1767–1841), who married George Spencer-Churchill, 5th Duke of Marlborough, and had children.
- Admiral George Stewart, 8th Earl of Galloway (1768–1834), who married Lady Jane Paget, the daughter of Henry Paget, 1st Earl of Uxbridge, and sister of Henry Paget, 1st Marquess of Anglesey.
- Lady Anne Harriet Stewart (1769–1850), who married Lord Spencer Chichester and had children
- Lady Elizabeth Euphemia Stewart (1771–1855), who married William Philips Inge in 1798.
- Hon. Leveson Keith Stewart (1772–1780)
- Lady Georgiana Frances Stewart (1776–1804)
- Lt.-Gen. Hon. Sir William Stewart (1774–1827), who married Frances Douglas and had children.
- Rt. Rev. Hon. Charles James Stewart (1775–1837), Bishop of Quebec, who died unmarried.
- Lady Charlotte Stewart (1777–1842), who married Sir Edward Crofton, 3rd Baronet, and had children.
- Lady Caroline Stewart (1778–1818), who married Rev. Hon. George Rushout-Bowles, and was the mother of George Rushout, 3rd Baron Northwick
- Hon. Montgomery Granville John Stewart (1780–1860), who married Catherine Honyman and had children.
- Hon. Edward Richard Stewart (1782–1851), who married Katherine Charteris and had children
- Lt.-Col. James Henry Keith Stewart (1783–1836)
- Lady Georgiana Charlotte Sophia Stewart (1785–1809), who married Col. Hon. William Bligh (1775–1845), son of John Bligh, 3rd Earl of Darnley, and had children.

Her husband inherited the earldom of Galloway in 1773, making her a countess. Lord Galloway died on 13 November 1806 and was succeeded in his titles by their eldest surviving son, George.

Lady Galloway died on 8 January 1830, aged 86, at Davies Street, Westminster, London.

=== Galloway estate ===
He died in 1806, at which point she became Dowager Countess of Galloway. Two years later, a court case ensued over a trust deed set up by the earl in 1804, whereby the trustees were authorised to sell property and appoint additional trustees. The dowager countess having declined to accept nomination as a trustee, a Mr Forbes, who had purchased part of the estate, took the trustees to the Court of Session, claiming he was not bound by the terms of the purchase; the Court of Session found against him.
