= John Stewart, 7th Earl of Galloway =

British politician (1736–1806)

The Right Honourable The Earl of Galloway KT
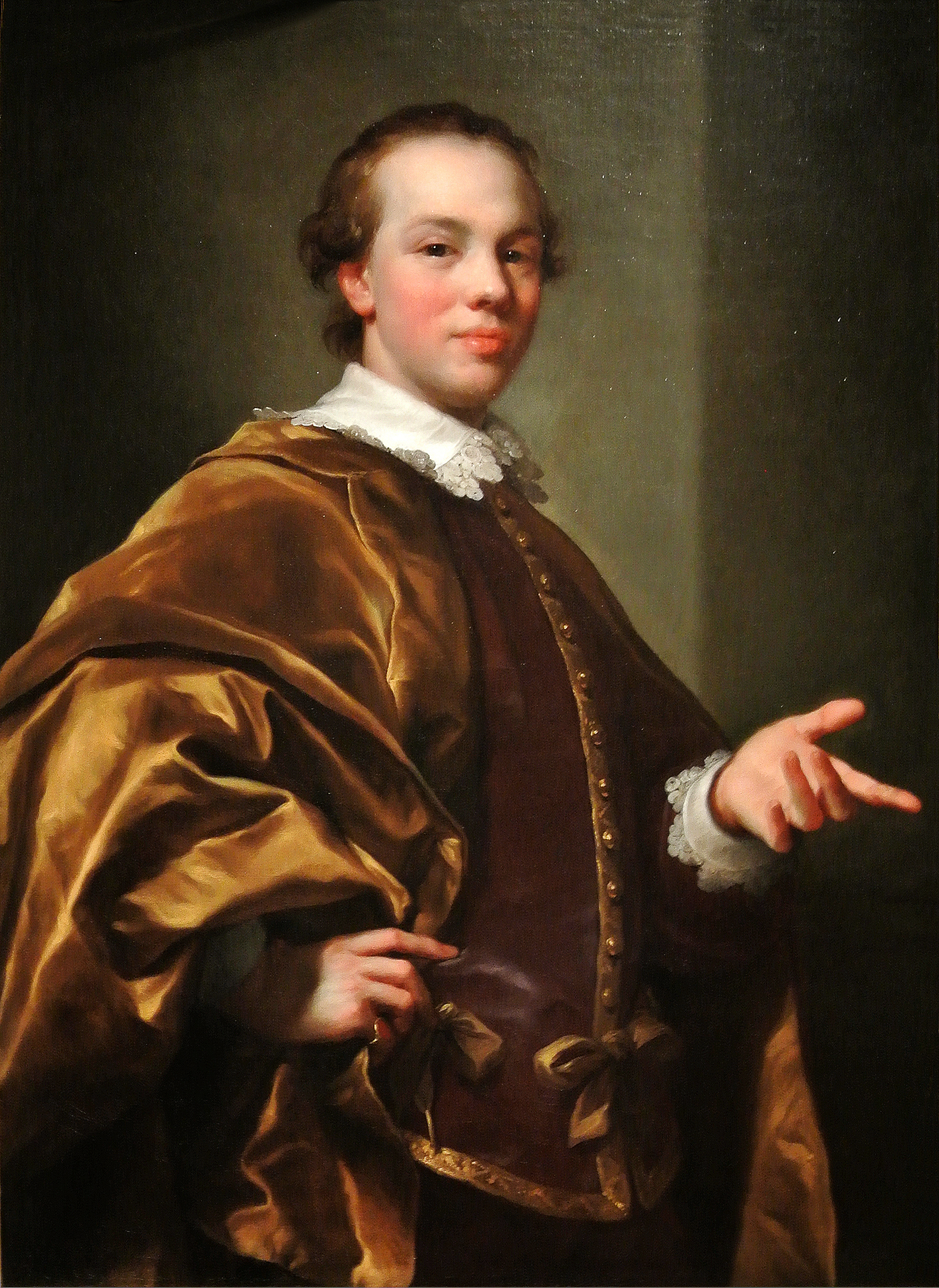
- Portrait by Anton Raphael Mengs, 1758

Lord Lieutenant of Kirkcudbright
- In office 1803–1806
- Preceded by: Viscount Garlies
- Succeeded by: The Earl of Selkirk

Lord Lieutenant of Wigtown
- In office 1794–1806
- Preceded by: Office created
- Succeeded by: Earl of Galloway

Member of Parliament for Ludgershall
- In office 1768–1773
- Preceded by: Thomas Whately; John Paterson
- Succeeded by: Sir Peniston Lamb; Whitshed Keene

Member of Parliament for Morpeth
- In office 1761–1768
- Preceded by: Thomas Duncombe; Sir Matthew Fetherstonhaugh
- Succeeded by: Peter Beckford; Sir Matthew Ridley

Personal details
- Born: 13 March 1736
- Died: 13 November 1806 (aged 70)
- Party: Tory
- Spouses: Lady Charlotte Greville (m. 1762; died 1763) Anne Dashwood (m. 1764)
- Children: 18, including George, William, Charles, Edward, James
- Parent(s): Alexander Stewart, 6th Earl of Galloway; Lady Catherine Cochrane
- Relatives: The Hon. Keith Stewart (brother); The Marchioness of Stafford (sister); The Earl of Dunmore (brother-in-law); The Duke of Hamilton (brother-in-law); The Marquess of Stafford (brother-in-law)

John Stewart, 7th Earl of Galloway, KT (13 March 1736 – 13 November 1806), styled Viscount Garlies from 1747 until 1773, was a British politician who became the 7th Earl of Galloway in 1773 and served as a Member of Parliament from 1761 to 1773.

== Early life ==
John Stewart was the eldest son and second child of Alexander Stewart, 6th Earl of Galloway (c. 1694–1773) and his, second wife, Lady Catherine Cochrane. His older sister, Lady Susanna Stewart (d. 1805), married Granville Leveson-Gower, 1st Marquess of Stafford. His other siblings included Admiral the Honourable Keith Stewart of Glasserton (1739–1795), Lady Margaret Stewart (d. 1762), Lady Charlotte Stewart (d. 1818) who married John Murray, 4th Earl of Dunmore, Lady Catherine Stewart (b. c. 1750), and Lady Harriet Stewart (d. 1788) who married Archibald Hamilton, 9th Duke of Hamilton.

His paternal grandparents were James Stewart, 5th Earl of Galloway and Catherine (née Montgomerie), a daughter of Alexander Montgomerie, 9th Earl of Eglinton. His mother was the youngest daughter of John Cochrane, 4th Earl of Dundonald.

== Career ==
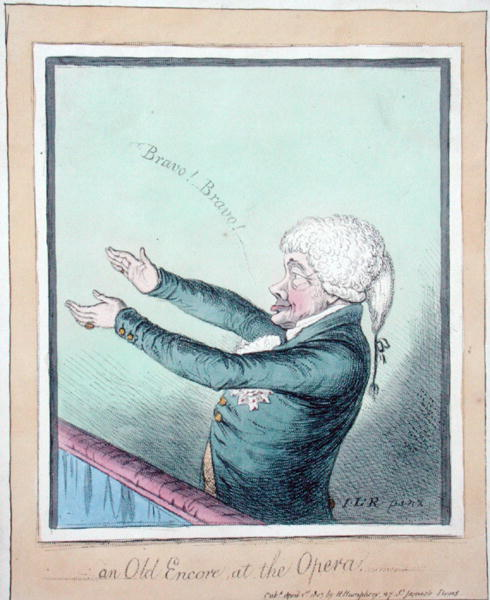
John Stewart depicted in James Gillray's An Old Encore at the Opera! of 1803

He was elected one of the Scottish representative peers, in the House of Lords, in 1774 and sat there until the 1790s. From 1783 until his death he was a Lord of the Bedchamber to King George III.

The Earl, a Tory, was the target of two hostile poems by Robert Burns, John Bushby's Lamentation and On the Earl of Galloway.

Galloway, a frequent opera-goer, was caricatured by James Gillray in An Old Encore at the Opera! of 1803. In 1762, James Boswell wrote of him that he had "a petulant forwardness that cannot fail to disgust people of sense and delicacy".

Besides being a Member of Parliament, Lord Galloway was a Lord of Police from 1768 to 1782, a Representative Peer for Scotland from 1774 to 1790, a Knight of the Thistle (1775), and a Lord of the Bedchamber from 1784 to 1806.

He succeeded his father Alexander in 1773.

=== Art patronage ===
The Earl of Galloway was painted in a miniature by Nathaniel Hone the Elder, as well as a full portrait by Anton Raphael Mengs in 1758 when he was Viscount Garlies, which is currently located at The Los Angeles County Museum of Art.

His second wife, Anne Dashwood, had a portrait painted of her by Sir Joshua Reynolds in 1764. The portrait of Anne is currently located at The Metropolitan Museum of Art in New York City. Lady Galloway, along with their daughter Susan Stewart, later Duchess of Marlborough, was also painted by Angelica Kauffmann.

== Personal life ==
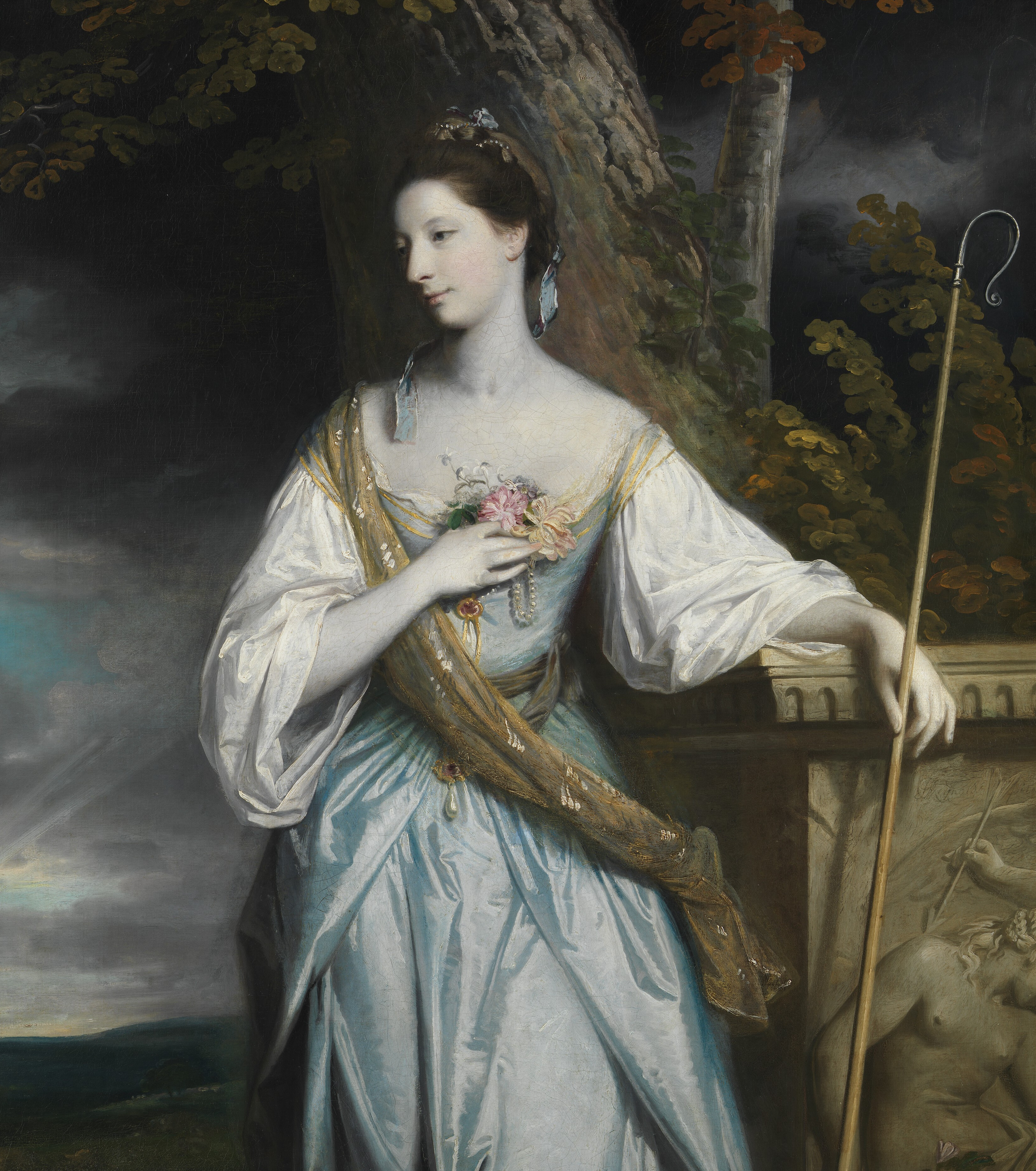
Portrait of his second wife, Anne Dashwood by Sir Joshua Reynolds in 1764, at The Metropolitan Museum of Art.

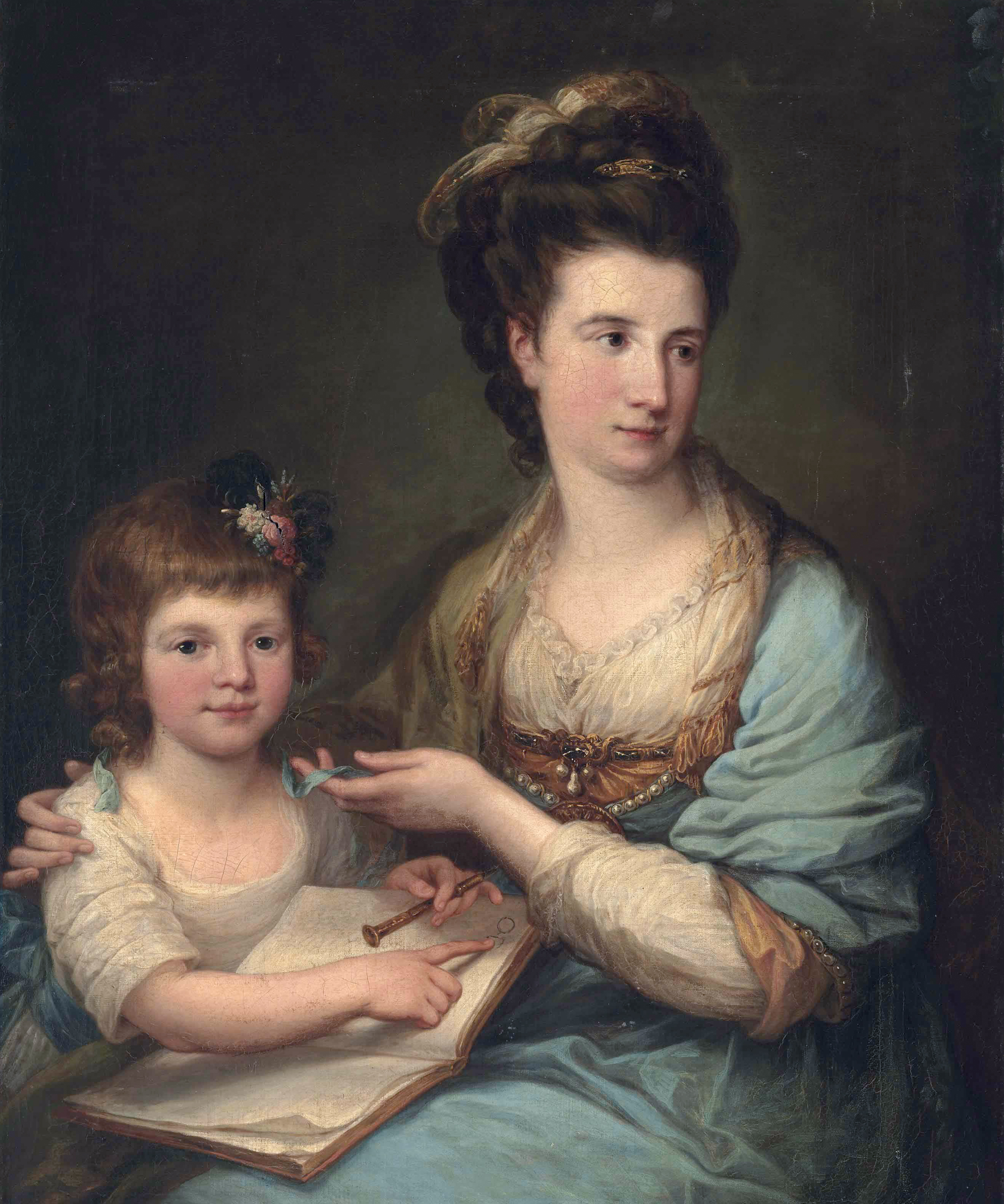
Lord Galloway's second wife, Anne Stewart, and their daughter, Susan Stewart, later Duchess of Marlborough (1767-1841), by Angelica Kauffmann.

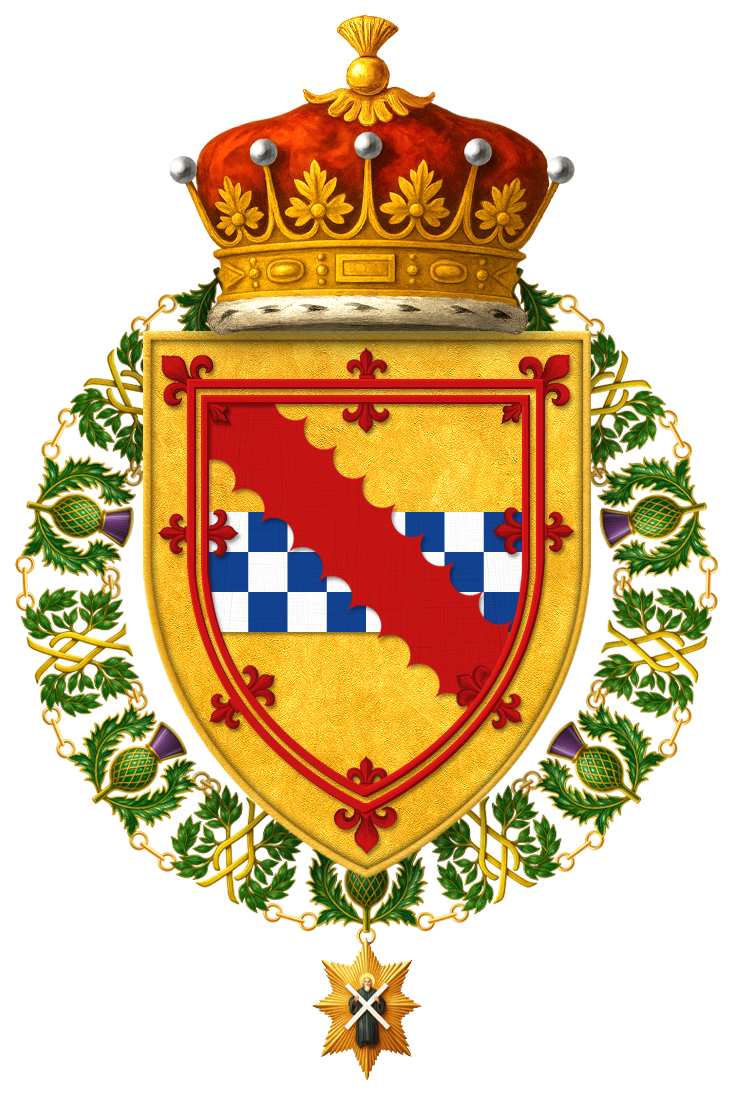
Shield of arms of John Stewart, 7th Earl of Galloway, KT, encircled with the collar of the Order of the Thistle.

On 14 August 1762, he married Lady Charlotte Greville (d. 1763), the daughter of Francis Greville, 1st Earl of Warwick (1719–1773). They had two sons, both of whom died in infancy.

After his first wife's early death, he remarried to Anne Dashwood (1743–1830), daughter of Sir James Dashwood, 2nd Baronet, on 13 June 1764. Together, John and Anne were the parents of sixteen children:

- Lady Catherine Stewart (1765–1836), who married Sir James Graham, 1st Baronet in 1781.
- Hon. Alexander Stewart (1766–1766), who died in infancy.
- Lady Susan Stewart (1767–1841), who married George Spencer-Churchill, 5th Duke of Marlborough in 1791.
- Adm. George Stewart, 8th Earl of Galloway (1768–1834), a naval commander and politician.
- Lady Anne Harriet Stewart (1769–1850), who married Lord Spencer Chichester in 1795
- Lady Elizabeth Euphemia Stewart (1771–1855), who married William Philips Inge in 1798.
- Hon. Leveson Keith Stewart (1772–1780), who died young.
- Lady Georgiana Frances Stewart (1776–1804).
- Lt.-Gen. Hon. Sir William Stewart (1774–1827), a military officer who was the first Commanding Officer of the Rifle Corps, a Division Commander in the Peninsular War, and an MP.
- Rt. Rev. Hon. Charles James Stewart (1775–1837), who became the Bishop of Quebec.
- Lady Charlotte Stewart (1777–1842), who married Sir Edward Crofton, 3rd Baronet in 1801.
- Lady Caroline Stewart (1778–1818), who married Rev. Hon. George Rushout-Bowles in 1803; mother of George Rushout, 3rd Baron Northwick.
- Hon. Montgomery Granville John Stewart (1780–1860).
- Hon. Edward Richard Stewart (1782–1851), an MP who became a Commissioner of the Victualling Board and Paymaster and Inspector-General of the Marines.
- Lt.-Col. James Henry Keith Stewart (1783–1836), who became a Tory Member of Parliament.
- Lady Georgiana Charlotte Sophia Stewart (1785–1809), who married Col. Hon. William Bligh (1775-1845), son of John Bligh, 3rd Earl of Darnley, in 1806.

Lord Galloway died on 13 November 1806 and was succeeded in his titles by his eldest surviving son, the Admiral George Stewart, 8th Earl of Galloway, who married Lady Jane Paget, the daughter of Henry Paget, 1st Earl of Uxbridge, and sister of Henry Paget, 1st Marquess of Anglesey.

=== Descendants ===
His grandson, George Spencer-Churchill (1793–1857), was the 6th Duke of Marlborough, and his brother was Lord Charles Spencer-Churchill (1794–1840). Through his grandson, he was the 3x great-grandfather of Winston Churchill.

His grandson, Randolph Stewart (1800–1873), was the 9th Earl of Galloway and served as Lord Lieutenant of Kirkcudbright from 1828 to 1845 and was MP for Cockermouth from 1826 to 1831. He married Lady Harriet Blanche Somerset, daughter of Henry Somerset, 6th Duke of Beaufort.

His grandson, George Rushout (1811–1887), was the 3rd Baron Northwick and served as MP for Evesham from 1837 to 1841 and MP for Worcestershire East from 1847 to 1859. He married the Hon. Elizabeth Augusta, daughter of William Bateman-Hanbury, 1st Baron Bateman and widow of George Drought Warburton, in 1869.

His granddaughter, Sophia Bligh, married Henry William Parnell (1809-1896) in 1835, the son of Henry Parnell, 1st Baron Congleton, who was a great uncle of Charles Stewart Parnell. Henry W. Parnell's sister, Emma Jane Parnell, was married to Edward Bligh, 5th Earl of Darnley.

Parliament of Great Britain
| Preceded by Thomas Duncombe; Sir Matthew Fetherstonhaugh | Member of Parliament for Morpeth; 1761–1768; With: Thomas Duncombe | Succeeded by Peter Beckford; Sir Matthew Ridley |
| Preceded by Thomas Whately; John Paterson | Member of Parliament for Ludgershall; 1768–1773; With: Sir Peniston Lamb | Succeeded by Sir Peniston Lamb; Whitshed Keene |
Honorary titles
| New office | Lord Lieutenant of Wigtown; 1794–1806 | Succeeded by The Earl of Galloway |
| Preceded by Viscount Garlies | Lord Lieutenant of Kirkcudbright; 1803–1806 | Succeeded by The Earl of Selkirk |
Peerage of Scotland
| Preceded by Alexander Stewart | Earl of Galloway; 1773–1806 | Succeeded by George Stewart |
