= Edward Richard Stewart =

Scottish Member of Parliament (MP)

Edward Richard Stewart (5 May 1782 – 27 August 1851) was a Scottish Member of Parliament (MP) in the Parliament of the United Kingdom and a Commissioner of the Victualling Board from 1809 to 1813. and Paymaster and Inspector-General of the Marines from 1812 to 1813.

== Early life and family ==
Edward Richard Stewart was born on 5 May 1782, the fifth surviving son of John Stewart, 7th Earl of Galloway, and his second wife, Anne Dashwood, daughter of Sir James Dashwood, 2nd Baronet. He was educated at Charterhouse. He married the Honourable Katherine Charteris, daughter of Francis Charteris, Lord Elcho. One of his children, Jane Frances Clinton Stewart (1817-1897), went on to marry her first cousin, George Spencer-Churchill, 6th Duke of Marlborough, son of George Spencer-Churchill, 5th Duke of Marlborough, and Lady Susan Stewart.

== Career ==
He represented Wigtown Burghs from 1806 to 1809. He was appointed a Commissioner of the Victualling Board from 1809 to 1813 and also appointed Paymaster and Inspector-General of the Marines from 1812 to 1813.

Parliament of the United Kingdom
Preceded by James Graham	Member of Parliament for Wigtown Burghs; 1806–1809	Succeeded by Lyndon Evelyn
