= Sir Edward Graham, 9th Baronet =

English Baronet

Sir Edward Graham, 9th Baronet (1820–1864) was an English Baronet.

== Origins ==
Sir Edward Graham, 9th Bt. was born on 1 January 1820. He was the son of Sir Robert Graham, 8th Bt. and Elizabeth Young. He married three times. His first marriage was to Anne on 5 June 1841. His second was to Adelaide Elizabeth Tully, daughter of James Dillon Tully, on 3 August 1844. His third and final marriage was to Amelia Ellen Akers, daughter of William John Akers, a cabinet maker, on 20 January 1855. He died on 27 May 1864 at age 44. He succeeded to the title of 9th Baronet Graham, of Esk, Cumberland [E., 1629] on 27 January 1852

== Death and posterity ==
He died of illness at the early age of 44. His nineteen-year-old son Sir Robert James Stuart Graham, 10th Baronet (1845–1917), succeeded him, as he was heir apparent.

Baronetage of England
Preceded by Robert Graham	Baronet (of Esk); 1852–1864	Succeeded by Robert Graham

== Sources ==
- Sir Edward Graham, 9th Baronet
