= Bob Daniels =

Bob Daniels may refer to:

- Bob Daniels (basketball), American basketball coach
- Bob Daniels (ice hockey) (born 1959), American ice hockey coach

== See also ==
- Robert Daniels (disambiguation)
