= Lord Charles Spencer-Churchill =

British army officer and politician

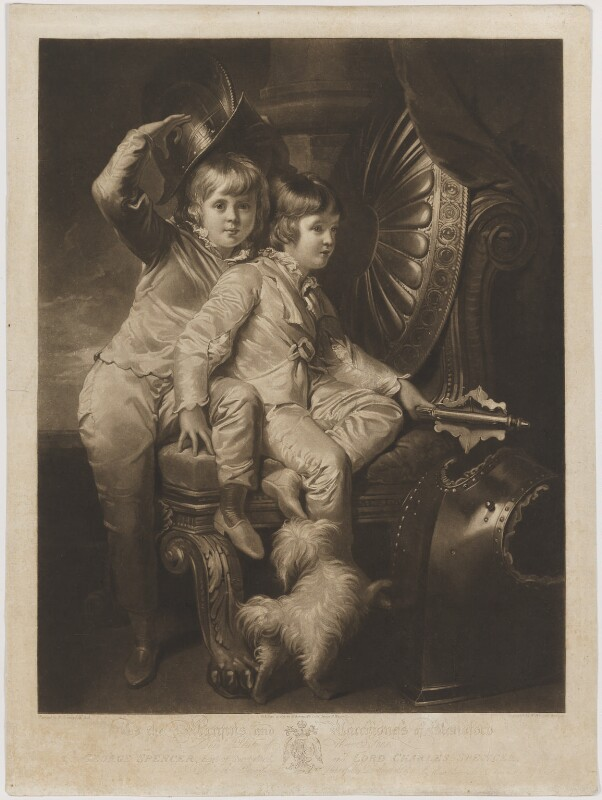
- George Spencer-Churchill, 6th Duke of Marlborough when Earl of Sunderland; Charles Spencer-Churchill
- Born: Lord Charles Spencer; 3 December 1794
- Died: 28 April 1840 (aged 45); London
- Burial place: Kensal Green Cemetery
- Military career
- Allegiance: United Kingdom
- Branch: British Army
- Service years: 1811–1832
- Rank: Lieutenant-colonel
- Units: 52nd Regiment of Foot; 75th Regiment of Foot
- Conflicts: Napoleonic Wars; Peninsular War; Siege of the Salamanca forts; Battle of Salamanca; Battle of San Millan-Osma; Battle of Vitoria; Battle of the Pyrenees; Battle of Nivelle; Battle of the Nive (WIA)

Lieutenant-Colonel Lord Charles Spencer-Churchill (née Spencer; 3 December 1794 – 28 April 1840) was a British Army officer and politician. He was the second son of George Spencer-Churchill, 5th Duke of Marlborough and Lady Susan Stewart, daughter of John Stewart, 7th Earl of Galloway.

== Life and career ==
His surname was Spencer until 1817, when his father changed his and his children's surname to Spencer-Churchill (by royal licence dated 26 May 1817).

After training as a gentleman cadet at the Royal Military College, Spencer was commissioned into the 68th (Durham) Regiment of Foot (Light Infantry) as an ensign on 31 December 1811. He served during the Peninsular War in Spain and France. On 19 May 1812, he became a second lieutenant in the 95th Regiment of Foot (Rifles). He was promoted to lieutenant in the 52nd (Oxfordshire) Regiment of Foot on 9 September 1813. On 2 June 1815, as captain of a company, he exchanged from the 60th into the 85th Regiment of Foot. He exchanged from the half-pay of the 85th to the 75th (Stirlingshire) Regiment of Foot on 28 October 1824. He purchased an unattached majority in the infantry on 16 June 1825, exchanging back into the 75th on 8 December 1825. He purchased an unattached lieutenant-colonelcy of infantry on 31 December 1827. On 24 August 1832, he exchanged into the Scots Guards as captain and lieutenant-colonel, but then sold his commission and retired on 31 August 1832. From 1818 until 1820, he also represented St. Albans in the House of Commons.

He married Etheldred Catherine Benett on 24 August 1827 and had five children:

- Susan Spencer-Churchill (d. 2 February 1898), married the Rev. and Hon. John Horatio Nelson, son of Thomas Nelson, 2nd Earl Nelson, and had issue
- Lt.-Col. Charles Henry Spencer-Churchill (27 May 1828 – 3 April 1877), married in 1862 to Rosalie Lowther, daughter of the Reverend Gorges Paulin Lowther
- Etheldreda Catherine Spencer-Churchill (15 June 1829 – 24 October 1881)
- Lucy Caroline Spencer-Churchill (29 January 1832 – 13 March 1904), married in 1880 to Rev. John Fletcher Dixon-Stewart, uncle of Rowena, Duchess of Somerset.
- John Kemys George Thomas Spencer-Churchill (27 December 1835 – 9 August 1913), married Edith Maxwell Lockhart, aunt of the novelist Jean Rhys

Spencer-Churchill was returned to Parliament in 1830 as member for the family borough of Woodstock, but went out in 1832 when the representation of that borough was reduced by the Great Reform Act. He replaced his elder brother, the Marquess of Blandford, in 1835, but having joined the Whigs was defeated in the election of 1837. Lord Charles was previously a Tory and, unlike his brother, did not support Reform.

Parliament of the United Kingdom
Preceded by Christopher Smith; William Tierney Robarts	Member of Parliament for St. Albans; 1818–1820; With: William Tierney Robarts	Succeeded by William Tierney Robarts; Christopher Smith
Preceded by Marquess of Blandford; Lord Ashley	Member of Parliament for Woodstock; 1830–1832; With: Marquess of Blandford 1830–1831; Viscount Stormont 1831–1832	Succeeded by Marquess of Blandford
Preceded by Marquess of Blandford	Member of Parliament for Woodstock; 1835–1837	Succeeded by Henry Peyton
