= James Henry Keith Stewart =

Scottish Tory Member of Parliament

James Henry Keith Stewart (22 October 1783 – 18 July 1836) was a Scottish Tory Member of Parliament.

Stewart was a younger son of John Stewart, 7th Earl of Galloway and his second wife, Anne Dashwood.

He represented Wigtown Burghs 1812–1821. In 1828, he became Assistant Secretary to the Treasury upon the premature decease of William Hill, and held that post until 22 January 1836, dying later that year.

Parliament of the United Kingdom
Preceded by Lyndon Evelyn	Member of Parliament for Wigtown Burghs; 1812–1821	Succeeded by Sir John Osborn, Bt
