= William Whateley (barrister) =

English barrister

William Whateley QC (2 November 1794 – 15 November 1862) was an English barrister. He was noted as a supporter of the Conservative Party and the Church of England.

== Life ==
He was born in Birmingham, the second son of William Whateley, a solicitor from Birmingham and Handsworth, and his wife, Mary. The solicitor and coroner, John Welchman Whateley (1792–1874) was his elder brother. His youngest sister, Caroline, married James Traill. A George Whateley, of Waterloo Street, Birmingham, appearing in 1846 before a parliamentary committee on the voting system, referred to "Mr. William Whateley of the Oxford circuit" as his brother.

In November 1813, aged 19, Whateley was admitted to Lincoln's Inn. He matriculated at New College, Oxford in 1815 aged 21, graduating B.A. in 1820, M.A. in 1825. He was called to the bar at the Inner Temple in 1825, and then went the Oxford circuit. In 1826 he represented one of the candidates in the Oxfordshire parliamentary election, and was noted there by John Marriott Davenport for his "platitudes and wit". He became Leader of the Oxford circuit. In 1841, he became a bencher of the Inner Temple, and a Queen's Counsel.

In 1847, Whateley stood as a Conservative parliamentary candidate, in South Shields, but was defeated by John Twizell Wawn, the Liberal. Again, in the 1852 United Kingdom general election, he stood as the Conservative candidate for Bath, but was unsuccessful against two Whigs, Thomas Phinn and George Treweeke Scobell.

As Treasurer of the Inner Temple, Whateley gave evidence in 1854 to a parliamentary committee looking into the Inns of Court. Asked about the importance of Latin and Greek for barristers, he stated "I believe that it is of great importance to the Profession to make it a gentleman's profession, and to make its foundation a liberal education." He was recorder of Shrewsbury, and at times sat as a judge in assize courts.

Whateley died on 15 November 1862, at Park Street, Westminster, aged 68. His library was sold by Puttick & Simpson, over four days in 1863.

== Family ==
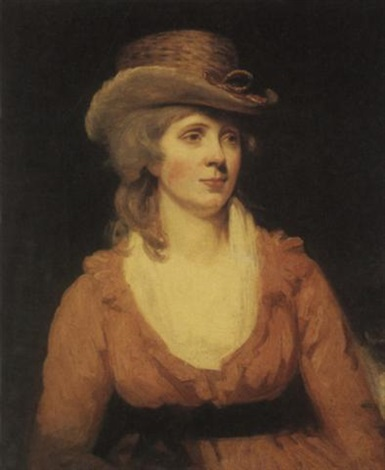
Portrait by John Hoppner, believed to be of Lady Elizabeth Spencer-Churchill, later Elizabeth Whateley

Whateley married in 1834 Elizabeth Martha Nares, daughter of the Rev. Edward Nares, as her second husband; she had previously been married to the Rev. Lord George Henry Spencer-Churchill (1796–1828), son of the George Spencer-Churchill, 5th Duke of Marlborough. He was appointed (1841) one of those superintending the repair of Blenheim Palace, under an act of parliament.

The Whateley family solicitors' business, which had become the largest in Birmingham, was sold in 1873 by John Whateley, brother to George, to Robert Harding Milward (1837–1903).
