= Graham baronets of Norton Conyers (1662) =

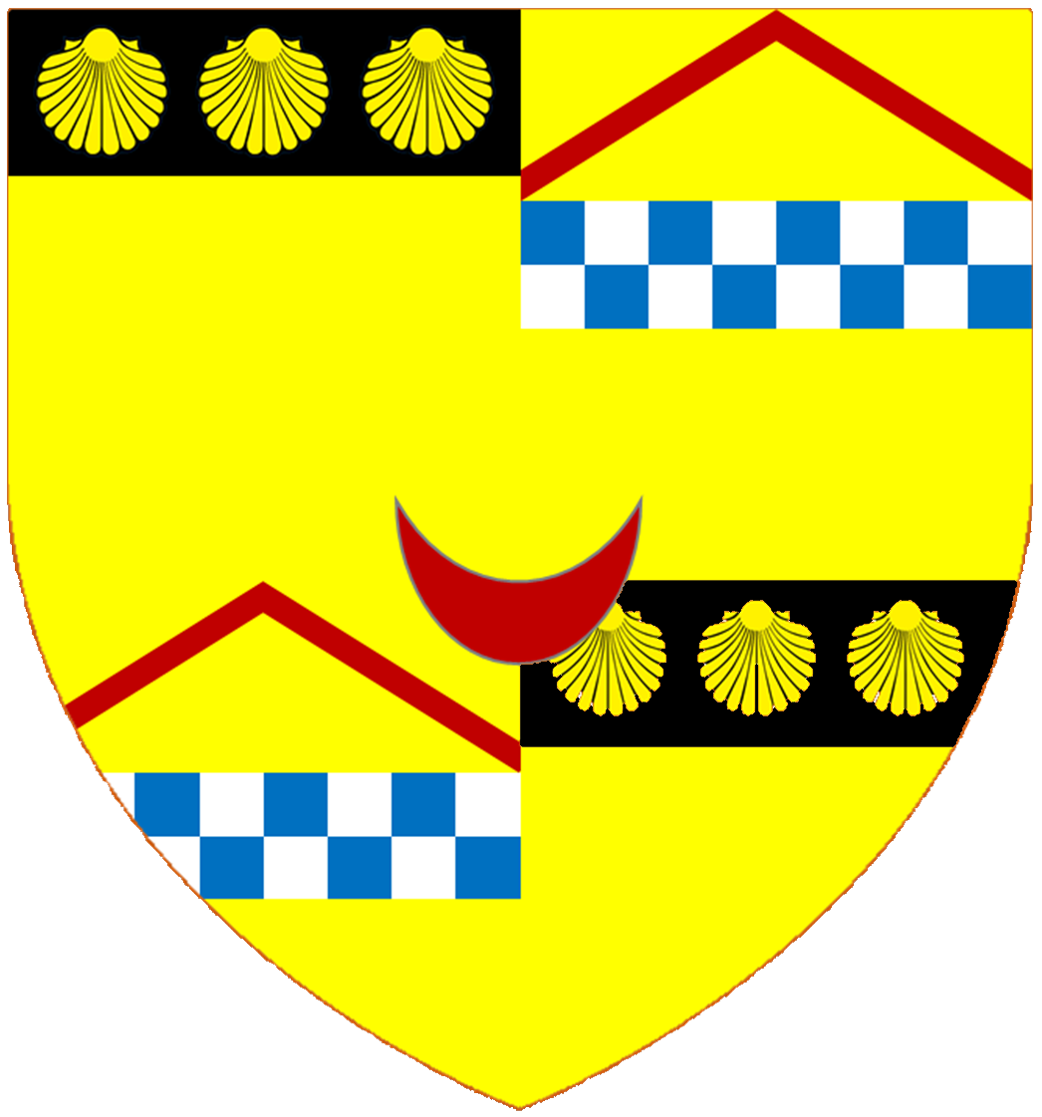
Escutcheon of the Graham baronets of Norton Conyers

The Graham baronetcy, of Norton Conyers in the County of York, was created in the Baronetage of England on 17 November 1662, for Richard Graham. He was the second son of the first of the Graham baronets of Esk (1629): the title was in honour of his late father's services to the Royalist cause, recognised after The Restoration of the monarchy.

== Graham baronets, of Norton Conyers (1662) ==
- Sir Richard Graham, 1st Baronet (1636–1711)
- Sir Reginald Graham, 2nd Baronet (1670–1728)
- Sir Bellingham Graham, 3rd Baronet (1702–1730)
- Sir Reginald Graham, 4th Baronet (1704–1755)
- Sir Bellingham Graham, 5th Baronet (1729–1790)
- Sir Bellingham Graham, 6th Baronet (c. 1764–1796)
- Sir Bellingham Reginald Graham, 7th Baronet (1789–1866)
- Sir Reginald Henry Graham, 8th Baronet (1835–1920)
- Sir (Reginald) Guy Graham, 9th Baronet (1878–1940)
- Sir Richard Bellingham Graham, 10th Baronet (1912–1982)
- Sir James Bellingham Graham, 11th Baronet (born 1940)

The heir presumptive is the present baronet's brother Jeremy Richard (born 1949). He has a son, Samuel Reginald (born 1979), who has a son, Laurence Reginald (born 2017).
