= Charles Spencer (cricketer) =

Welsh cricketer

Personal information
- Full name: Charles Richard Spencer
- Born: 21 June 1903; Llandough, Penarth, Vale of Glamorgan, Wales
- Died: 29 September 1941 (aged 38); Havant, Hampshire, England
- Batting: Right-handed
- Role: Wicketkeeper

Domestic team information
- Years: Team
- 1925: Glamorgan
- 1923–1924: Oxford University

Career statistics
Competition	FC
Matches	4
Runs scored	46
Batting average	11.50
100s/50s	–/–
Top score	17
Balls bowled	–
Wickets	–
Bowling average	–
5 wickets in innings	–
10 wickets in match	–
Best bowling	–
Catches/stumpings	1/1
- Source: Cricinfo, 26 June 2010

Charles Richard Spencer (21 June 1903 – 29 September 1941) was a Welsh cricketer. Spencer was a right-handed batsman and wicketkeeper. He was born at Llandough, Penarth, Vale of Glamorgan.

While at Magdalen College, Oxford, Spencer made his first-class debut playing for Oxford University in 1923 against the touring West Indians. During that same season, he played for the university against HDG Leveson-Gower's XI. His final appearance for the University came in 1924 against Middlesex.

Spencer also represented Glamorgan in a single first-class match in 1925 against HDG Leveson-Gower's XI at St. Helen's. In his first-class career, he scored 46 runs at a batting average of 11.50, with a high score of 17. Behind the stumps he took 1 catch and made 1 stumping.

Following his brief cricketing career, he went on to teach at Stowe School, Buckinghamshire. Spencer died at Havant, Hampshire, on 29 September 1941 while serving as Captain with the Royal Marines. He was found shot in the head on a footpath with his service revolver next to him. He was buried at Haslar Royal Naval Cemetery, Gosport.
