= Graham baronets of Dromore (1964) =

Extinct UK baronetcy

The Graham baronetcy, of Dromore in the County of Down, was created in the Baronetage of the United Kingdom on 23 January 1964 for Clarence Graham. He was a director of John Graham, Ltd, engineering contractors, and Chairman of the Standing Committee of the Ulster Unionist Council from 1947 to 1963. The title became extinct on the death of the second baronet in 2020.

== Graham baronets, of Dromore (1964) ==
- Sir Clarence Johnston Graham, 1st Baronet (1900–1966)
- Sir John Moodie Graham, 2nd Baronet (1938–2020)
