= Graham baronets of Gartmore (1665) =

Escutcheon of the Graham baronets of Gartmore

The Graham Baronetcy, of Gartmore in the County of Stirling, was created in the Baronetage of Nova Scotia on 28 June 1665 for William Graham; he had bought the Gartmore estate in 1645. The title became extinct on the death of the unmarried 2nd Baronet in 1708.

== Graham baronets, of Gartmore (1665) ==
- Sir William Graham, 1st Baronet (died 1684)
- Sir John Graham, 2nd Baronet (died 1708)
