= Graham baronets of Braco (1625) =

Arms of the Graham baronets of Braco.

The Graham baronetcy, of Braco in the County of Perth, was created in the Baronetage of Nova Scotia on 28 September 1625 for William Graham. The title became dormant on the death of the fourth Baronet c.1700. According to Cokayne, it is apparently extinct; with the title consequently vesting in the Duke of Montrose. The Official Roll as of 2026 shows the 8th Duke of Montrose as the 12th Baronet.

== Graham baronets, of Braco (1625) ==
- Sir William Graham, 1st Baronet (died c. 1635)
- Sir John Graham, 2nd Baronet (died c.1646)
- Sir William Graham, 3rd Baronet (died c.1684)
- Sir James Graham, 4th Baronet (c.1661–c.1700) (dormant)

Considered to have been held subsequently by the Dukes of Montrose.
