= Randolph Spencer Churchill =

Randolph Spencer Churchill may refer to:

- Lord Randolph Churchill (1849–1895), British statesman and father of Winston Churchill
- Lady Randolph Churchill (1854–1921), American-born British socialite and wife of the above
- Randolph Churchill (1911–1968), British Army officer and son of Winston Churchill
