= Robert Mackenzie Daniel =

Scottish journalist and novelist

Robert Mackenzie Daniel (1813 – 21 March 1847) was a Scottish journalist and novelist.

== Life ==
Daniel was a son of John Daniel, a merchant, and was baptized on 4 September 1813 in Peterhead, Scotland. He was educated in Inverness, at Marischal College in Aberdeen, and at the University of Edinburgh, where he studied law for four years with the intention of becoming an advocate; but he abandoned this idea and resolved to adopt literature as a profession. He moved to London in 1836, contributed largely to the magazines, and was appointed editor of the Court Journal.

In 1842, he married Elizabeth (1823 – c.1878), an illegitimate daughter of George Spencer-Churchill, 5th Duke of Marlborough and Matilda Glover. They had two children.

Daniel's first work of fiction, The Scottish Heiress, appeared in 1843, and was followed in the same year by The Gravedigger. In 1844 he moved to Jersey, where he produced The Young Widow, which was favourably received; The Young Baronet (1845) sustained the reputation of the author, who was styled the "Scottish Boz". In January 1845 he accepted the editorship of the Jersey Herald, and he remained in the post until September 1846, when he was overtaken by mental illness. His friends placed him in Bethlehem Hospital, London, and he died there on 21 March 1847. A posthumous romance by him, The Cardinal's Daughter, appeared in 1847.

His widow Elizabeth, the illegitimate daughter of the 5th Duke of Marlborough, had a career as a novelist, beginning at about the time of her husband's hospitalization. From 1846 to 1877 she published about thirty novels, the most notable being Georgina Hammond (1849).
