= Susan Spencer-Churchill, Duchess of Marlborough =

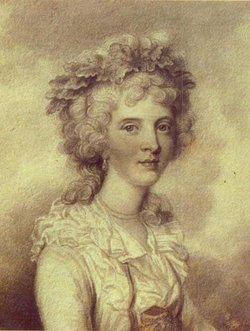
Lady Susan Stewart, Duchess of Marlborough

Susan Spencer-Churchill, Duchess of Marlborough (previously Spencer and Lady Blandford; 10 April 1767 – 2 April 1841), formerly Lady Susan Stewart, was the wife of George Spencer-Churchill, 5th Duke of Marlborough.

Lady Susan Stewart was the daughter of John Stewart, 7th Earl of Galloway, and his second wife, the former Anne Dashwood. She married the future duke on 15 September 1791, when he was styled Marquess of Blandford. They were married at her father's house in St James's Square, London, by the Archbishop of Canterbury, John Moore.

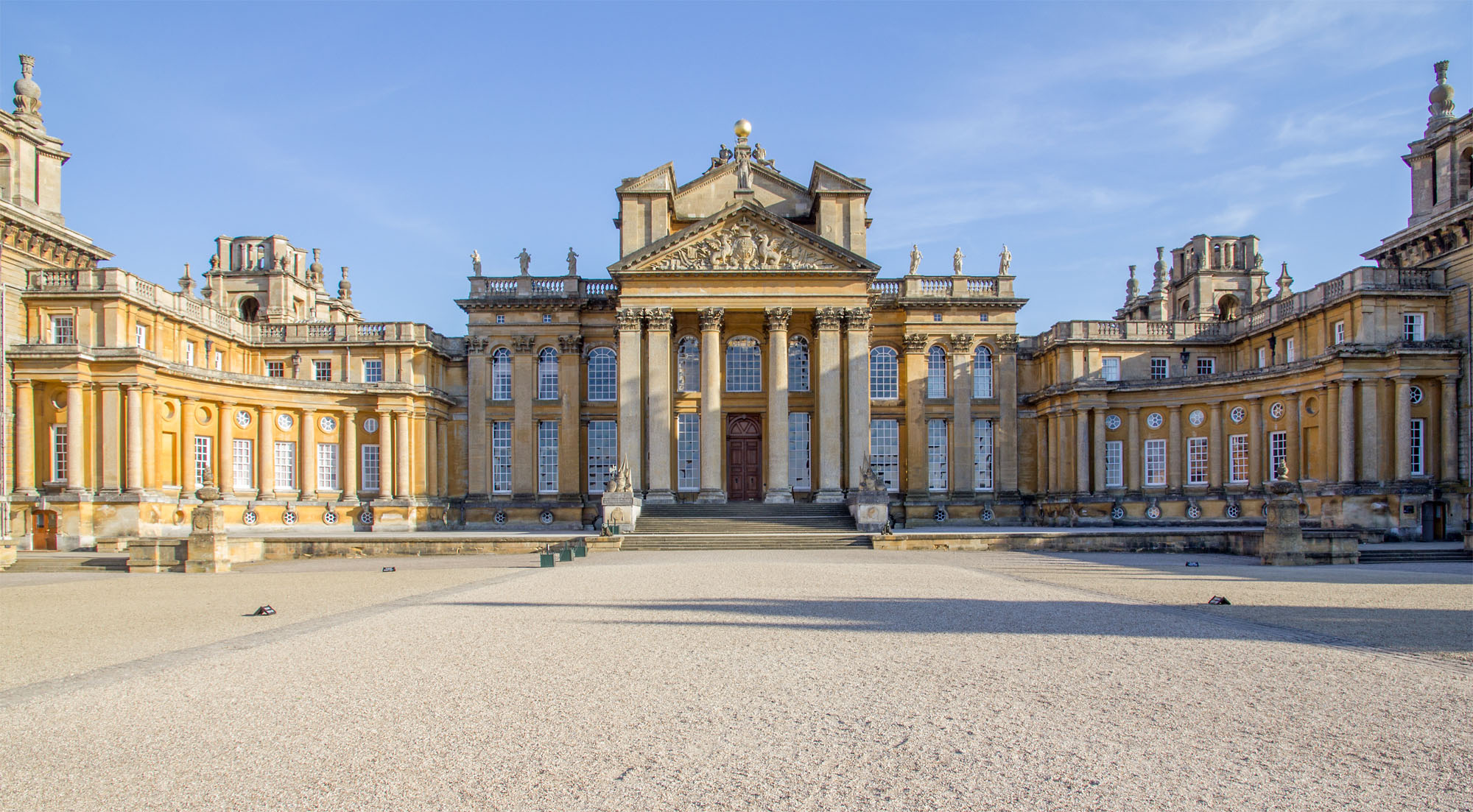
Blenheim Palace North Facade

They had four children:

- George Spencer-Churchill, 6th Duke of Marlborough (1793–1857)
- Lord Charles Spencer-Churchill (1794–1840), who married Ethelred Catherine Benett and had children
- Reverend Lord George Henry Spencer-Churchill (1796–1828), who married his cousin Elizabeth Martha Nares, daughter of Red. Edward Nares and Lady Caroline Spencer-Churchill (daughter of the fourth duke) and had no children.
- Lord Henry John Spencer-Churchill (1797–1840). Lord Henry John was a naval captain, and died on board HMS Druid of "congestion of the brain", off Macao, where he is buried.

In 1817 the marquess inherited the dukedom from his father, George Spencer, 4th Duke of Marlborough, at which point his wife became Duchess of Marlborough; later that year, he changed their surname from Spencer to Spencer-Churchill (by royal licence dated 26 May 1817).

The duchess died at her house in Park Lane, London, aged 73. In the previous year two of her sons, Charles and Henry John, had died, along with Charles's wife and her husband the duke himself. She was buried in the chapel of Blenheim Palace.

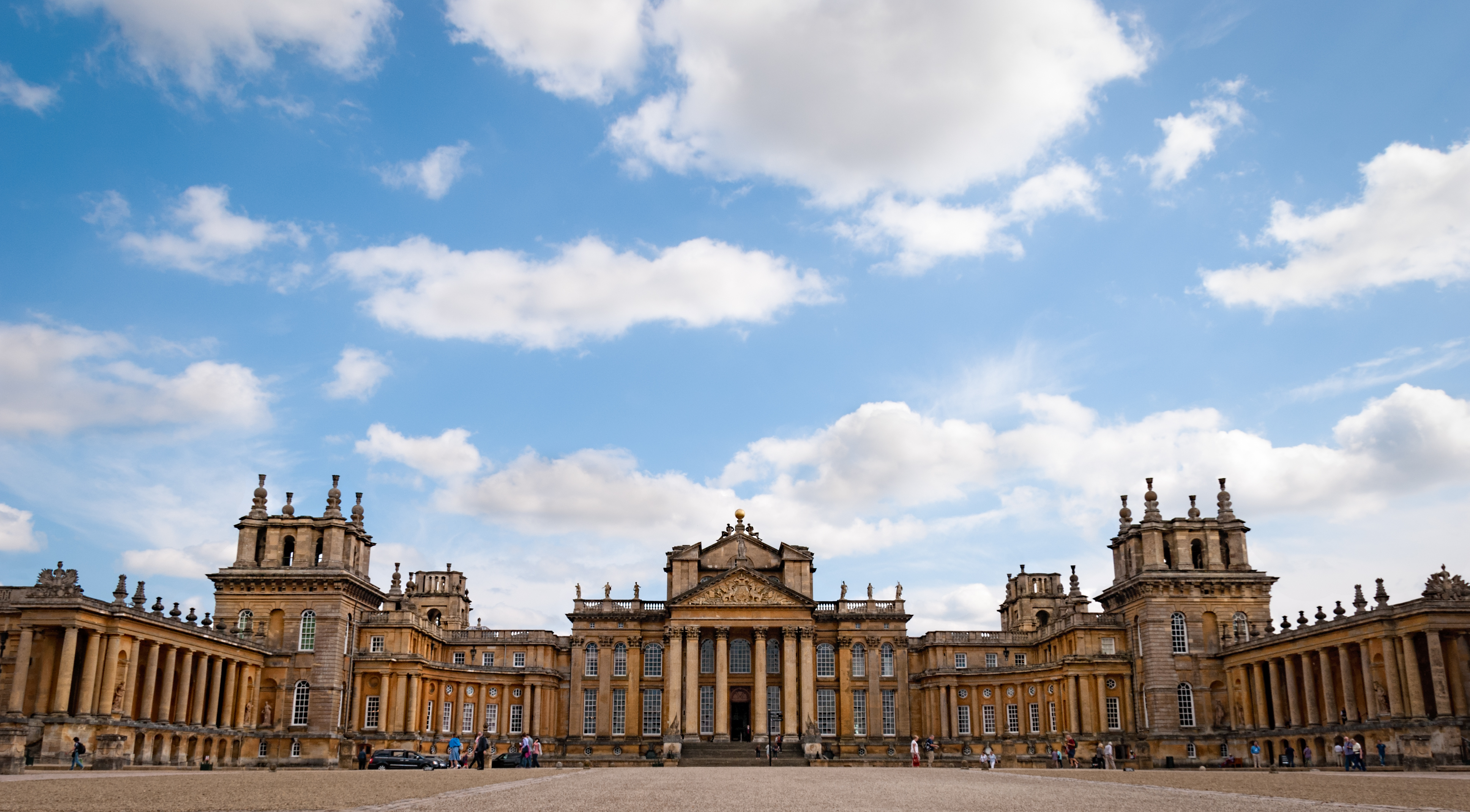
Blenheim Palace Panorama
