= Charles Stewart (bishop) =

English clergyman, bishop, and politician

Charles James Stewart
- Bishop of Quebec
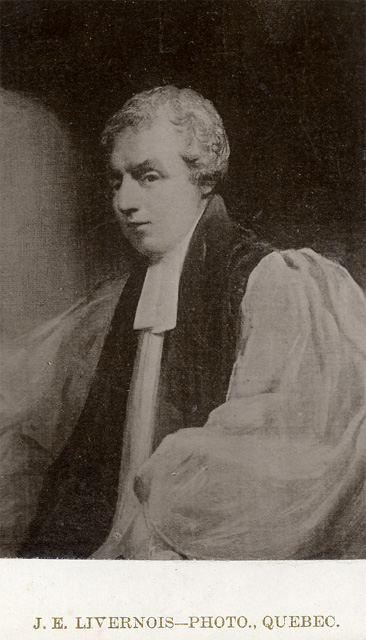
- Church: Anglican Church of Canada
- Predecessor: Jacob Mountain
- Successor: George Jehoshaphat Mountain

Personal details
- Born: 13 or 16 April 1775 London, England
- Died: 13 July 1837 (aged 62) London, England

Charles James Stewart (13 or 16 April 1775 – 13 July 1837) was a Church of England bishop, and politician. He was the second Bishop of Quebec from 1826 to 1837, and in connection with this was appointed to the Legislative Council of Lower Canada.

Stewart at one point was on the Legislative Councils of both Upper and Lower Canada and on both the Executive Councils (the jurisdiction above Legislative) of Upper and Lower Canada, however the appointments were more likely due to Stewart's position as second Anglican bishop over any sort of political want or desire (evident by Stewart never going to any legislative meetings in Upper Canada, and "limited meetings" in Lower Canada, and never really participating within the clergy reserve's Anglican issue regarding equal shares of the clergy land profit the Church of Scotland or education secularization).

Stewart was instrumental in the introduction of a scheme involving Anglican laypeople within a diocesan synod system, necessitated by the arguments within the government regarding the clergy reserves and the potential elimination of clerical salaries and stipends coming on behalf of government money from the Society for the Propagation of the Gospel. This influence within the scheme on Stewart's part came to because he involved the laity with the clergy. Stewart "supplemented the labours of the clergy by appointing catechists to act as lay readers". The SPG was initially sceptical but nonetheless funded the scheme, which became a success and "one of Stewart's most effective creations." Ten lay-readers were subsequently ordained in the Anglican priesthood.

Stewart founded the first Anglican church in the Eastern Townships in 1808, now called "Bishop Stewart Memorial Church of the Holy Trinity", in Frelighsburg in Saint-Armand. Saint-Armand is supposedly home to the first establishment of the Eastern Townships in Quebec, and was a site of skirmish during the Rebellions of 1837–1838 which reflects the original name of Saint-Armand, Moore's Corner. Stewart would establish some 23 churches in the Eastern Townships before becoming the second Anglican Bishop of Quebec and some 40 churches and 25 missions in total. Stewart was also critical in protesting the elimination of clerical stipends in Canada period, as it was only due to the protestation of Stewart and the SPG that stipends stayed - but were ultimately reduced by some 15%.

He "was said to have been somewhat ungainly and at times lacking in political and business sense" but he was "deep in his religious faith, asceticism, generosity of spirit and purse, and his genuine care for the spiritual interests of pioneer immigrants and native Indians (Indigenous)". Stewart is historically remembered as "earning the affection of his clergy and people" and as having "a secure place among the builders of the (various) church(es) of Canada". Stewart is accredited with "raising the level of education from Sunday school and elementary school to university."

== Birth, education, and works ==
Born in London, England, the third surviving son of John Stewart, 7th Earl of Galloway and his second wife, Anne Dashwood, Stewart was a member of Corpus Christi College, Oxford when he graduated Bachelor of Arts in 1795 and a fellow of All Souls College, Oxford when this matured to a Master of Arts in 1799. He was ordained to the Anglican ministry in the diaconate in December 1798 and to the priesthood in May 1799. From 1799 to 1826, he was Rector of Orton Longueville in Huntingdonshire. In 1807, he arrived in Lower Canada as a missionary, settling in Montreal. He soon moved to Saint-Armand and helped to build Trinity Church, Frelighsburg, the first regular place of Anglican worship in the Eastern Townships. In 1826, he was appointed Bishop of Quebec. He died in London in 1837, and is buried there in Kensal Green Cemetery.

Stewart published a 20-page book in 1815 after "seven years of intense labour and close observation of the [eastern] townships" called A short view of the present state of the Eastern Townships in the Province of Lower Canada, Bordering on the Line 54° with Hints for their Improvement, which "intended to provide prospective immigrants with a concise description of the climate, topography, economy, and population of the region." Within the book, Stewart argues for the immigration of Americans (his first Anglican mission in Lower Canada in the seigneury of Saint-Armand was about 5 kilometers from the American border with Vermont) as well as what "the most effective means of acquiring their loyalty (to the Crown over the American Republican structure)" would be (that being "to ensure their welfare and prosperity"). Stewart argued that the Americans would be “in many respects . . . the best settlers in a new country”.

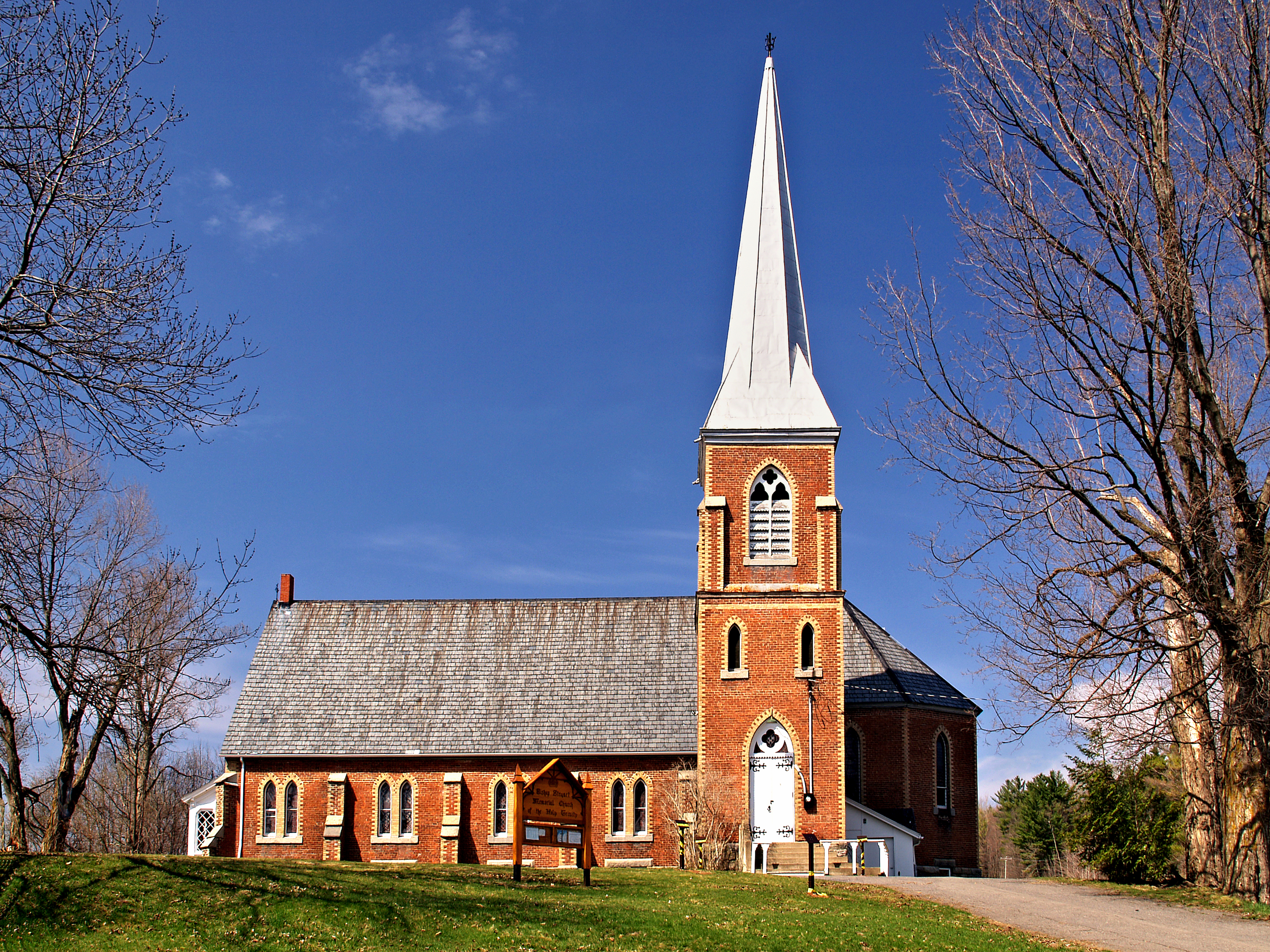
Bishop Stewart Memorial Church of the Holy Trinity, Frelighsburg

Stewart published a diocesan work during the controversy in the clergy reserves regarding the Church of Scotland and rampant conflict and complaint regarding the Anglican church (such as being at "the top" of the system and of possessing privileges other institutions and therefore people did not, like "Protestant" being assumed as "Anglican") in order to "strengthen the Anglican Church in face of attacks." Much of this contention came from the prominent influence of John Graves Simcoe. This work to defend the Anglican church was called the Christian Sentinel and Anglo-Canadian Churchman’s Magazine based out of Montreal, edited "in part for its short life" by another Anglican clergyman and journalist, Brooke Bridges Stevens.
