= Charles Henry Spencer-Churchill =

British army officer

- Born: May 28, 1828
- Died: April 3, 1877 (aged 48); Menton, France
- Allegiance: United Kingdom
- Branch: British Army
- Rank: Lieutenant Colonel
- Commands: Rifle Brigade; 60th Regiment of Foot; 68th Regiment of Foot
- Battles / wars: Crimean War; Indian Mutiny

Lieutenant-Colonel Charles Henry Spencer-Churchill (27 May 1828 – 3 April 1877) was a British army officer who fought in the Crimean War and the Indian Mutiny.

== Life and career ==
He was the eldest son of Lord Charles Spencer-Churchill, a veteran of the Peninsular War, and he was educated at Eton College. On 10 October 1845, he purchased a second lieutenant's commission in the Rifle Brigade. He served with the brigade during the Seventh Xhosa War.

After the outbreak of the Crimean War, Spencer-Churchill purchased a captaincy on 4 August 1854. He was commended for gallantry by Lord Raglan during the war, breveted major on 2 November 1855, and received the Order of the Medjidie, 5th class.

On 17 June 1857, Spencer-Churchill exchanged into the 60th Regiment of Foot and went out to India, where he took part in the suppression of the Indian Mutiny and was present at the capture of Delhi.

In 1862, Spencer-Churchill married Rosalie Lowther, daughter of the Reverend Gorges Paulin Lowther. He served with his regiment in Canada and was breveted lieutenant-colonel in the 60th Foot on 5 September 1865, but went on temporary half-pay on 11 December 1866. His health had been permanently impaired by exposure during the Crimean War.

On 13 January 1869, he exchanged from half-pay into the 68th Regiment of Foot, and he retired the same day. He died of tuberculosis near Menton on 3 April 1877.
