= William Tierney Robarts =

British politician and businessman

William Tierney Robarts (1786 - 9 December 1820 in London) was a British politician and businessman.

He was the youngest son of Abraham Robarts and his wife Sabine (née Tierney). He grew up with three brothers, including Abraham Wildey Robarts and George James Robarts, and three sisters. The politician George Tierney was his uncle.

Robarts was a London entrepreneur and from 1810, a director of the Bank of England. On 26 February 1818 he was elected to the House of Commons in the constituency of St. Albans, where he remained until his death. William Tierney Robarts died unmarried and childless on 9 December 1820. In the resulting by-election Henry Wright Wilson was elected to the House of Commons.
