= George Spencer-Churchill, 5th Duke of Marlborough =

British politician and antiquarian

His Grace The Duke of Marlborough FSA
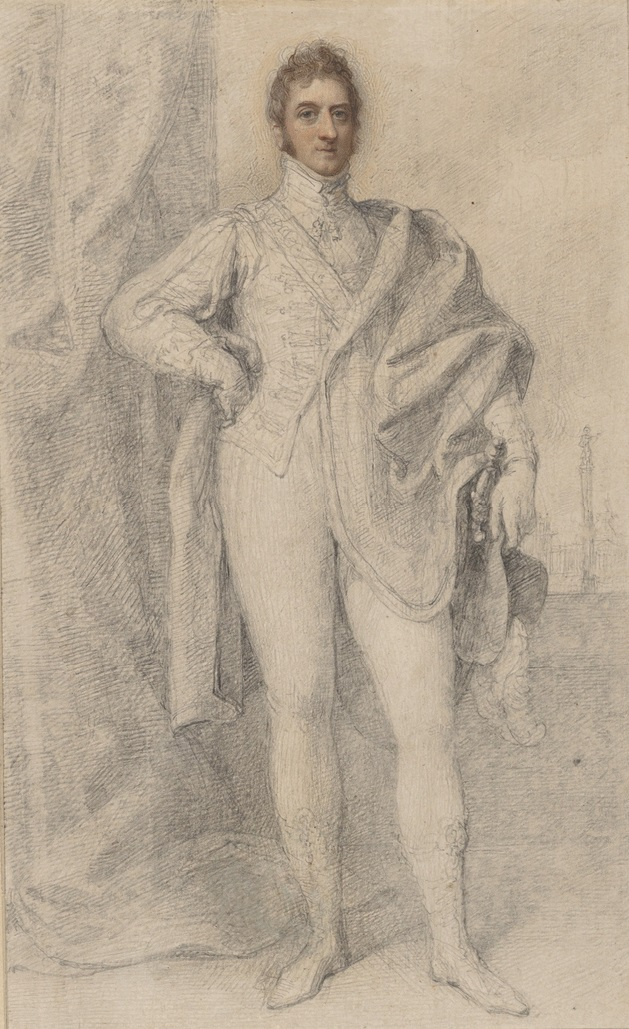
- Predecessor: George Spencer
- Successor: George Spencer-Churchill
- Born: 6 March 1766
- Died: 5 March 1840 (aged 73); Blenheim Palace, Woodstock, Oxfordshire, UK
- Spouse: Lady Susan Stewart
- Issue: George Spencer-Churchill, 6th Duke of Marlborough; Lord Charles Spencer-Churchill; Lord George Henry Spencer-Churchill; Lord Henry John Spencer-Churchill
- Father: George Spencer, 4th Duke of Marlborough
- Mother: Lady Caroline Russell

George Spencer-Churchill, 5th Duke of Marlborough FSA (6 March 1766 – 5 March 1840), styled Marquess of Blandford until 1817, was a British nobleman, politician, peer, and collector of antiquities and books.

He was the first one to specifically use the surname "Spencer-Churchill"; Churchill was the name of the first Duke.

== Background and education ==
Spencer-Churchill was the eldest son of George Spencer, 4th Duke of Marlborough, and Lady Caroline Russell, daughter of John Russell, 4th Duke of Bedford. Francis Spencer, 1st Baron Churchill, was his younger brother. He was educated at Eton between 1776 and 1783 and at Christ Church, Oxford, between 1784 and 1786, where he graduated on 9 December 1786 as a Bachelor of Arts, later proceeding automatically to Master of Arts. He was later given the honorary degree of Doctor of Laws (D.C.L.) from the University on 20 June 1792.

== Career ==
Lord Blandford represented Oxfordshire in parliament as a Whig between 1790 and 1796 and Tregony as a Tory between 1802 and 1806. From 1804 to 1806, he served under William Pitt the Younger as a Lord of the Treasury. The latter year he was summoned to the House of Lords through a writ of acceleration in his father's barony of Spencer of Wormleighton. During this time, he lived in Berkshire, at Remenham and Hurst. From 1798, he resided at Whiteknights Park at Earley, near Reading, where he became famous for his extravagant collecting of antiquities, especially books. He was invested as a Fellow of the Society of Antiquaries (FSA) on 8 December 1803.

Although the Marquess was born and baptised with the name of George Spencer, soon after succeeding to the Dukedom of Marlborough, he had it legally changed on 26 May 1817 to George Spencer-Churchill. This illustrious name did not, however, save him from his mounting debts, and his estates were seized and his collections sold. He retired to Blenheim Palace, where he lived the remainder of his life off a small annuity granted to the first Duke by Queen Anne.

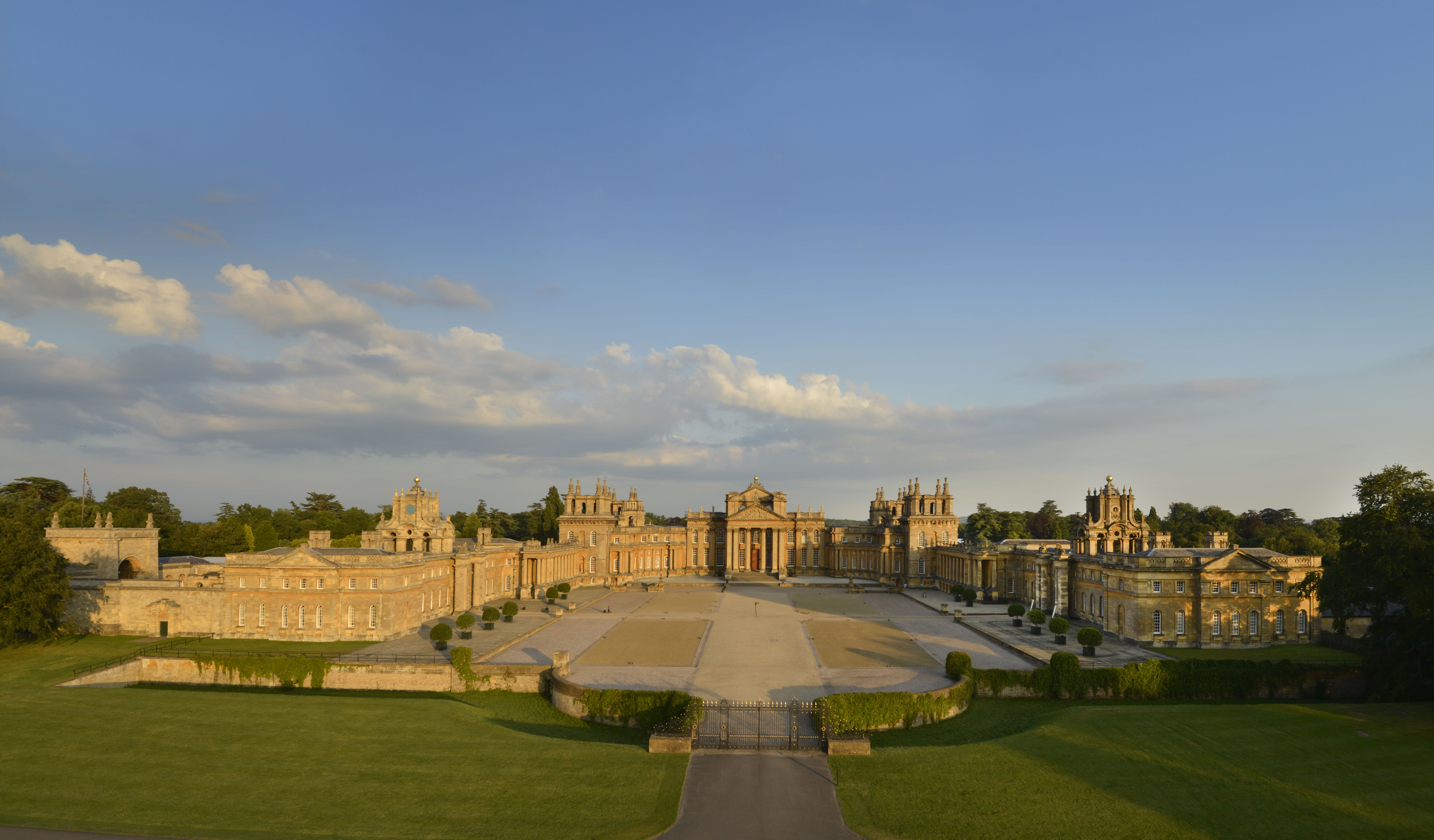
Blenheim Palace, seats of Duke of Marlborough.

The diarist Harriet Arbuthnot wrote one of her most scathing comments about the Duke following a visit to Blenheim in 1824:

The family of the great General is, however, gone sadly to decay, and are but a disgrace to the illustrious name of Churchill, which they have chosen this moment to resume. The present Duke is overloaded with debt, is very little better than a common swindler and lets everything about Blenheim. People may shoot and fish at so much per hour and it has required all the authority of a Court of Chancery to prevent his cutting down all the trees in the park.

== Family ==
Marlborough married Lady Susan Stewart (1767–1841), daughter of John Stewart, 7th Earl of Galloway, on 15 September 1791. They had four children:

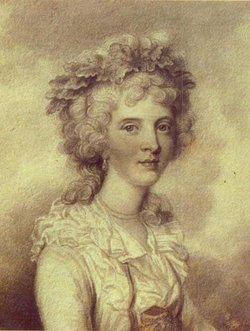
Lady Susan Stewart, Duchess of Marlborough

- George Spencer-Churchill, 6th Duke of Marlborough (1793–1857)
- Lord Charles Spencer-Churchill (1794–1840), married Ethelred Catherine Benett and had issue.
- Reverend Lord George Henry Spencer-Churchill (1796–1828), married Elizabeth Martha Nares; after his death, she married in 1834 the barrister William Whateley.
- Lord Henry John Spencer-Churchill (1797–1840). Died and buried in Macao 2 June 1840, whilst as Captain of HBM Ship Druid.

Winston Churchill was the duke's great-great-grandson.

Illegitimate children:

- John Tustian (1799–1873).

Illegitimate children:

- Ann Spencer (1802-1880)

Illegitimate children by Matilda Glover (1802–1876)

- Georgina Matilda (1819–1898)
- Caroline Augusta (1821–1905)
- Elizabeth (Ellen) (1823–1878), married novelist Robert Mackenzie Daniel (1813–1847), and became a novelist herself .
- Henry Spencer (1831–1831)
- George (?)
- Henry Churchill, died in 1908, Campamento, Algeciras, Spain. Illegitimate son of Elizabeth Matilda Glover.

The Duke died in March 1840, aged 73, at Blenheim Palace and was buried there in the vault beneath the chapel on 13 March 1840. His eldest son George, Marquess of Blandford, succeeded in the title. The Duchess of Marlborough died at Park Lane, Mayfair, London, in April 1841, aged 73.

== Literature ==
- Mary Soames; The Profligate Duke: George Spencer Churchill, Fifth Duke of Marlborough, and His Duchess (1987)

Parliament of Great Britain
Preceded by Lord Charles Spencer; The Viscount Wenman	Member of Parliament for Oxfordshire; 1790–1796; With: Lord Charles Spencer	Succeeded by Lord Charles Spencer; John Fane
Parliament of the United Kingdom
Preceded by Sir Lionel Copley; John Nicholls	Member of Parliament for Tregony; 1802–1804; With: Charles Cockerell	Succeeded by Charles Cockerell; George Thellusson
Peerage of England
Preceded by George Spencer	Duke of Marlborough; 1817–1840	Succeeded by George Spencer-Churchill
Preceded by George Spencer	Baron Spencer of Wormleighton (writ of acceleration); 1806–1840	Succeeded by George Spencer-Churchill
