= Graham baronets of Esk (1629) =

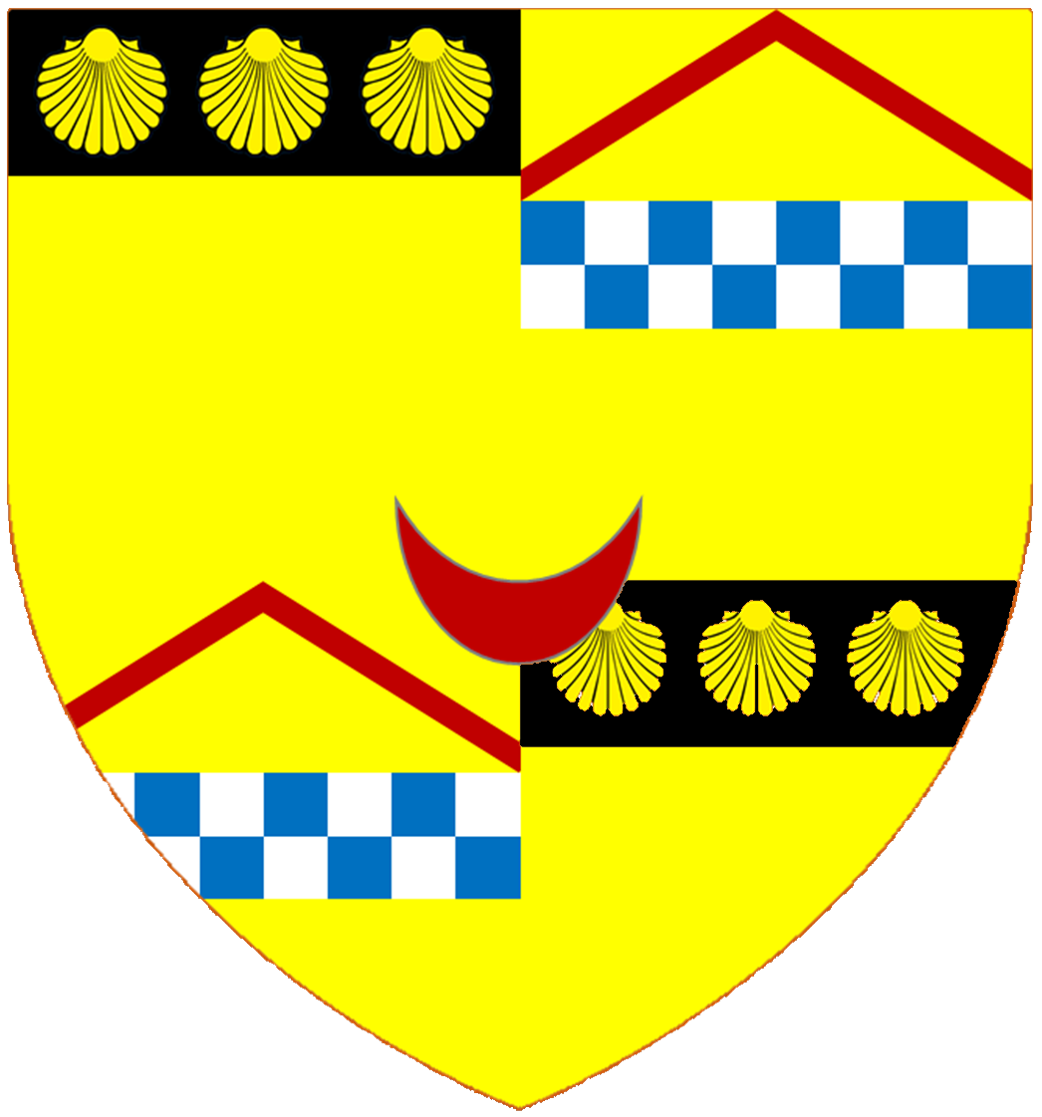
Escutcheon of the Graham baronets of Esk and Viscounts Preston

The Graham baronetcy, of Esk (Eske) in the County of Cumberland, was created in the Baronetage of England on 29 March 1629 for Richard Graham (c.1583–1654). He represented Carlisle in Parliament, was a Gentleman of the Horse to King Charles I and fought at the Battle of Edgehill in 1642.

The 3rd Baronet served as Ambassador to France and as Secretary of State to King James II. In 1681 he was created Lord Graham of Esk and Viscount Preston in the Peerage of Scotland. After the Glorious Revolution he was created Baron of Esk in the peerage of England by the exiled King James II and was condemned for high treason but was later pardoned. The peerages became extinct on the death of the third Viscount in 1739. The late Viscount was succeeded in the baronetcy by his kinsman William Graham, the 6th Baronet.

== Graham baronets, of Esk (1629) ==
- Sir Richard Graham, 1st Baronet (died 1654)
- Sir George Graham, 2nd Baronet (c. 1624–1658)
- Sir Richard Graham, 3rd Baronet (1648–1695) (created Viscount Preston in 1681)

== Viscounts Preston (1681) ==
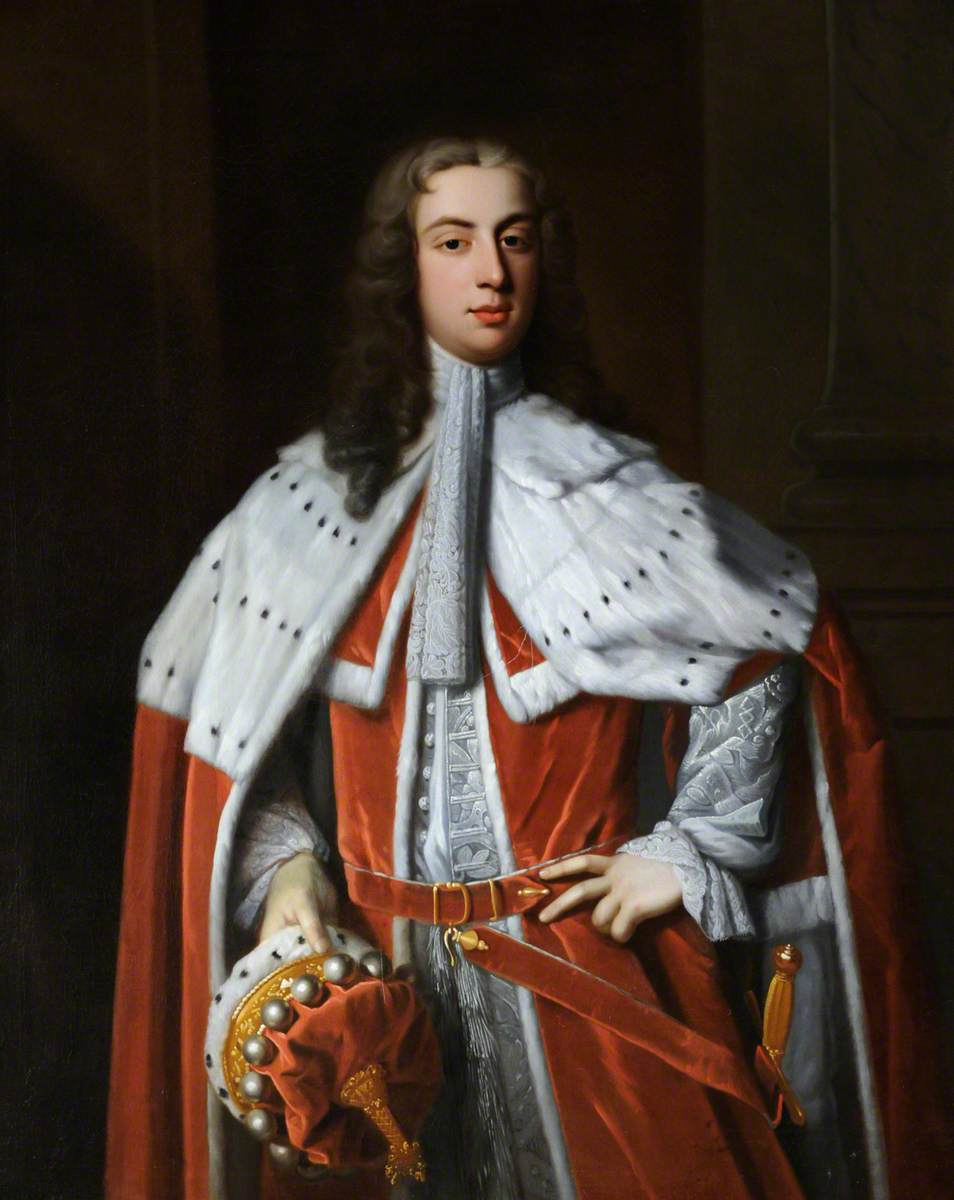
A portrait of the 3rd Viscount Preston by Enoch Seeman

- Richard Graham, 1st Viscount Preston (1648–1695)
- Edward Graham, 2nd Viscount Preston (1679–1710)
- Charles Graham, 3rd Viscount Preston (1706–1739)

== Graham baronets, of Esk (1629; Reverted) ==
- Sir William Graham, 6th Baronet (1730–1774)
- Sir Charles Graham, 7th Baronet (1764–1795)
- Sir Robert Graham, 8th Baronet (1769–1852)
- Sir Edward Graham, 9th Baronet (1820–1864)
- Sir Robert James Stuart Graham, 10th Baronet (1845–1917)
- Sir Montrose Stuart Graham, 11th Baronet (1875–1939)
- Sir Montrose Stuart Graham, 12th Baronet (1904–1975)
- Sir Ralph Wolfe Graham, 13th Baronet (1908–1988)
- Sir Ralph Stuart Graham, 14th Baronet (born 1950). His name does not appear on the Official Roll of the Baronetage.

The heir apparent is the present holder's brother, Robert Bruce Graham (born 1953).
