= The First Churchills =

BBC miniseries

- DVD cover
- Genre: Period drama
- Based on: Marlborough: His Life and Times by Winston Churchill
- Written by: Donald Wilson
- Directed by: David Giles
- Starring: Susan Hampshire; John Neville; John Standing; James Villiers
- Opening theme: "Trumpet Tune (Warlike Consort)" from King Arthur by Henry Purcell
- Ending theme: "Rondeau" from Abdelazer, or The Moor's Revenge by Henry Purcell
- Country of origin: United Kingdom
- Original language: English
- No. of series: 1
- No. of episodes: 12

Production
- Camera setup: Studio: Multi-camera; Exteriors: Single-camera
- Running time: 50 minutes
- Production company: BBC

Original release
- Network: BBC2
- Release: 27 September – 13 December 1969

The First Churchills is a BBC serial from 1969 about the life of John Churchill, 1st Duke of Marlborough, and his wife, Sarah Churchill, Duchess of Marlborough. It stars John Neville as the duke and Susan Hampshire as the duchess, was written and produced by Donald Wilson, and was directed by David Giles. It is notable as being the first programme shown on PBS's long-running Masterpiece series in the United States. Wilson and Giles were fresh from their success in writing and directing The Forsyte Saga, which also starred Susan Hampshire and Margaret Tyzack. Hampshire received an Emmy award for her performance as Sarah.

== Overview ==
The serial presents the lives of John and Sarah Churchill from their meeting in 1673 until a time shortly after the death of Queen Anne in 1714, and illustrates, along the way, much of the context of contemporary English politics, including the emergence of the Whig and Tory parties and the two-party system. Like many BBC serials of the era, it was made on a low budget, with sound-studio sets, and generally avoided battle and crowd scenes because they were unable to stage them in a convincing manner. The series is based on a book written by the Marlboroughs' most famous descendant, Winston Churchill's Marlborough: His Life and Times, and as such presents a very favourable portrait of the Marlboroughs. The serial depicts most of the important political figures of the day.

== Cast ==
- Sarah Churchill, Duchess of Marlborough: Susan Hampshire
- John Churchill, 1st Duke of Marlborough: John Neville
- King Charles II: James Villiers
- King James II: John Westbrook
- Queen Mary, wife to James II: Sheila Gish
- King William III: Alan Rowe
- Queen Mary II: Lisa Daniely
- Queen Anne: Margaret Tyzack
- Prince George of Denmark: Roger Mutton
- King Louis XIV: Robert Robinson
- Sidney Godolphin: John Standing
- Margaret Blagge, countess Godolphin: Holly Wilson
- Lord Shaftesbury: Frederick Peisley
- Lord Shrewsbury: Job Stewart
- James, Duke of Monmouth: James Kerry
- Robert Harley: Richard Pearson
- Barbara, Duchess of Cleveland: Moira Redmond
- Francis Godolphin: Richard Warwick
- Henrietta Churchill: Polly Adams
- John Wilmot, Earl of Rochester: Graham Armitage
- Lord Russell: Colin Bean
- Duchess of Portsmouth: Consuela Chapman
- Charles Churchill: Michael Culver
- Nell Gwyn: Andria Lawrence
- D'Artagnan: Michael Lynch
- Henrietta Wentworth: Kay Patrick
- Marquess of Carmarthen: Arthur Pentelow
- Duke of Buckingham: Bruce Purchase
- Laurence Hyde, 1st Earl of Rochester: John Ringham
- Titus Oates: Nicholas Smith
- Henry St John: Michael Attwell
- Abigail Masham: Jill Balcon
- James Stuart, the Old Pretender: Freddie Wilson
- Anne Churchill: Yvonne Antrobus
- Charles Spencer, 3rd Earl of Sunderland: Robert Mill
- Adam de Cardonnel: William Job
- William Cadogan: Bernard Taylor
- John Churchill, Marquess of Blandford: Francis Wallis
- Anthonie Heinsius: David King
- Count Johann Wenzel Wratislaw: Kenneth Ives
- Prince Eugene of Savoy: John Saunders
- Marshal Tallard: Edward Dentith
- Elector of Bavaria: Guy Standeven
- Lord Cutts: Donald Sumpter
- Margrave of Baden: Clive Cazes
- Sir John Vanbrugh: John Carlin
- Samuel Masham: Gordon Whiting
- Lord Somers: Charles West
- Marquis de Torcy: Derek Cox
- Duchess of Somerset: Rosina Stewart
- Duke of Somerset: Clifford Parrish
- Lord Halifax: Austin Trevor
- Robert Spencer, 2nd Earl of Sunderland: John Humphry
- Lady Sunderland: Lillias Walker
- Archbishop Sancroft: Kevin Stoney
- Count Bentinck, later Lord Portland: Roger Booth
- Robert Young: Davyd Harries
- Bishop Sprat: Julian d'Albie
- Archbishop Tenison: Graham Leaman
- Duke of Gloucester: Michael Reynolds

== Episodes ==
No.	Title	Original release date
1	"The Chaste Nymph"	27 September 1969
2	"Bridals"	4 October 1969
3	"Plot Counter-Plot"	11 October 1969
4	"The Lion and the Unicorn"	18 October 1969
5	"Rebellion"	25 October 1969
6	"The Protestant Wind"	1 November 1969
7	"Trial of Strength"	8 November 1969
8	"The Queen Commands"	15 November 1969
9	"Reconciliation"	22 November 1969
10	"A Famous Victory"	29 November 1969
11	"Breaking the Circle"	6 December 1969
12	"Not Without Honour"	13 December 1969

== Music ==
The theme for the opening titles of each episode is the "Trumpet tune (Warlike consort)" from Act V of Henry Purcell's opera King Arthur. The theme for the closing credits of each episode is the second piece, a Rondeau, of Henry Purcell's incidental music, composed about 1695, to Aphra Behn's 1676 play Abdelazer, or The Moor's Revenge, perhaps better known as the theme used by Benjamin Britten in The Young Person's Guide to the Orchestra.

== DVD ==
The serial was released on DVD in 2004, distributed by Acorn Media UK.
