= Anne Spencer, Viscountess Bateman =

English noblewoman (1702–1769)

The Right Honourable The Viscountess Bateman

Viscountess Bateman Baroness Culmore
- Reign: 12 July 1725 – December 1744 (19 years)
- Predecessor: The first viscountess
- Successor: Elizabeth Sambroke
- Born: Lady Anne Spencer; 1702
- Died: 19 February 1769 (1769 (aged 66–67); Cleveland Row, Middlesex
- Noble family: Spencer (by birth); Bateman (by marriage)
- Spouse: William Bateman, 1st Viscount Bateman (m. 1700)
- Issue: John Bateman, 2nd Viscount Bateman; Captain Hon. William Bateman
- Father: Charles Spencer, 3rd Earl of Sunderland
- Mother: Lady Anne Churchill

Anne Spencer, Viscountess Bateman (1702 – 19 February 1769) was a daughter of Charles Spencer, 3rd Earl of Sunderland and Lady Anne Churchill, daughter of John Churchill, 1st Duke of Marlborough and Sarah Jenyns.

== Family ==
Anne Spencer was born in 1702, the third child and eldest daughter of Charles Spencer, 3rd Earl of Sunderland and Lady Anne Churchill, daughter of John Churchill, 1st Duke of Marlborough and Sarah Jenyns. She had two older brothers who were Robert (1700–1701) and Robert Spencer, 4th Earl of Sunderland and three younger siblings, including Charles Spencer, 3rd Duke of Marlborough, John and Diana Spencer, Duchess of Bedford.

== Marriage and children ==
Lady Anne Spencer was once followed by Henry Pelham, younger brother of Thomas Pelham-Holles, 1st Duke of Newcastle, husband of Henrietta Godolphin, Anne's cousin but she said to her maternal grandmother, the Duchess of Marlborough that she had no thought of him. The Duchess of Marlborough believed put her grandchild refusal down to her "great passion for money even as a child."

During 1719, Sarah Churchill, Duchess of Marlborough was preoccupied with marrying Lady Anne Spencer, then 17 years old, to William Bateman, a son of a South Sea Company director named James Bateman. But before giving approval to the match, she had her servants to enquire the truth about Mr. Bateman's estate. And although she found that Mr. Bateman had misrepresented about the true size of his estate, she still agreed to the marriage as she believed that he had enough for Lady Anne and William Bateman to live on if they were good at household managing, declaring that "Though there must be money to make a family easy I shall always prefer sense and virtue before the greatest estates or titles". On the other hand, it was more difficult to make Charles Spencer, 3rd Earl of Sunderland, Lady Anne's father, pay some portion of his eldest daughter's dowry as he seemed content his children meet their maternal side's cost as well as care. Mindful of the final wishes of her decreased daughter, the late Countess of Sunderland, Sarah badgered her son in law until he agreed to pay part of the dowry. At this point, Sarah had nothing but kind words for Lady Anne, her daughter's eldest daughter.

In the spring of 1720, Anne married William Bateman at Blenheim Palace. The young couple spent the first part of their honeymoon in their town house in Soho. The mansion was built for James Scott, 1st Duke of Monmouth, Charles II of England's illegitimate son but was sold to the husband's father by the duke's widow, Anne Scott, 1st Duchess of Buccleuch. Sir James had completed the building and add stables to it. Then the couple spent time at their hungting lodge at Totteridge, celebrating their nuptials with servants and neighbours, before setting off for their country seat of Shobdon in Herefordshire. Anne had brought her cousin, Lady Anne Egerton and thanked her grandmother for her cousin's company, "for she is so good humoured and so easy that she makes every body cheerfull." Her husband had sent a gift of beef and mutton to Blenheim, which she hoped would "be as good as ours is here which he says is the best of the world."

On 12 July 1725, he was created Viscount Bateman and Baron Culmore, in the Peerage of Ireland, making Anne become Viscountess Bateman and Baroness Culmore. Unfortunately, their marriage was loveless and her husband was rumoured to be homosexual.

They had two children:

- John Bateman, 2nd Viscount Bateman (April 1721 – 2 March 1802); married Elizabeth Sambroke, daughter of John Sambroke and Elizabeth Forester. They had no children so after his death, his titles became extinct.
- William Bateman (1726 – 2 March 1783); captain in Royal Navy.

== Appearance ==
Anne was not considered as a beauty. Her face and lips were narrow, accentuating her large nose; her lashes were pale, however her figure was slender and graceful, her flaxen hair falling lightly to her shoulders.

== Characters ==
Anne considered herself as an intelligent woman, a "woman of parts." According to Horace Walpole, Lady Bateman inherited 'the intriguing spirit of her father and grandfather, the Earls of Sunderland', to which should of course be added the equally intriguing spirit of her grandmother, the Duchess of Marlborough. She remained more involve with her own family than the one she was married to.

== Relationships with family members ==
Anne and her grandmother, Sarah Jennings, Duchess of Marlborough had a bad relationship. When Anne's mother died, she left a letter with desire that her mother, the Duchess of Marlborough should take care of all the girls and little boys who were too young to go to school. Although agreeing with her daughter's wish, she didn't take Lady Anne as she wrote to Lord Sunderland: "except taking Lady Anne which I did not offer, thinking that since you take Lady Frances home, who is 18 years old, she would be better with you than me, as long as you live, with the servants that her dear mother chose to put about her." As a result, Lady Anne lived with her father and half sister Frances. (Note: Lady Frances Spencer was Charles Spencer, 3rd Earl of Sunderland's daughter with his first wife, Lady Arabella Cavendish) But at that time there were no outward sign of animosity between them. The Duchess promised to Anne's father that she would be "all the use that I can be in everything that she wants me" and if Sarah should live longer than Lord Sunderland, she would "take as much care of her as if she were my own child."

Sarah was the one arranging the marriage of Lady Anne as Lord Sunderland was with king George I in Hanover.

== Death ==
The Dowager Viscountess Bateman died in Cleveland Row, Middlesex, on 19 February 1769, aged around 66.

== Ancestry ==
Ancestors of Anne Spencer, Viscountess Bateman

16. William Spencer, 2nd Baron Spencer of Wormleighton
8. Henry Spencer, 1st Earl of Sunderland
17. Penelope Wriothesley
4. Robert Spencer, 2nd Earl of Sunderland
18. Robert Sidney, 2nd Earl of Leicester
9. Dorothy Sidney
19. Dorothy Percy
2. Charles Spencer, 3rd Earl of Sunderland
20. John Digby, 1st Earl of Bristol
10. George Digby, 2nd Earl of Bristol
21. Beatrice Walcott
5. Anne Digby
22. Francis Russell, 4th Earl of Bedford
11. Anne Russell
23. Catherine Brydges
1. Anne Spencer
24. John Churchill
12. Winston Churchill
25. Sarah Winston
6. John Churchill, 1st Duke of Marlborough
26. John Drake
13. Elizabeth Drake
27. Eleanor Boteler
3. Anne Churchill
28. John Jennings
14. Richard Jenyns
29. Alicia Spencer
7. Sarah Jennings
30.
15. Frances Thornhurst
31.

== Bibliography ==
- Cokayne, George Edward (1887). The Complete Peerage (Edition 1, Volume 1).
- Hibbert, Christopher (2001). The Marlboroughs. Penguin. ISBN 0-670-88677-7.
- Massey, Victoria (1999). The first Lady Diana. London: London House. ISBN 978-1-902809-01-4.
- Noble, Mark (1806). A Biographical History of England, from the Revolution to the End of George I's Reign: Being a Continuation of the Rev. J. Granger's Work; Consisting of Characters Disposed in Different Classes; and Adapted to a Methodical Catalogue of Engraved British Heads; Interspersed with a Variety of Anecdotes, and Memoirs of a Great Number of Persons. Vol. 2. W. Richardson.
- Field, Ophelia (2003). The Favourite: Sarah, Duchess of Marlborough. London : Sceptre. ISBN 978-0-340-76808-2.
- Hicks, Carola (2002). Improper pursuits : the scandalous life of an earlier Lady Diana Spencer. New York : St. Martin's Press. ISBN 978-0-312-29157-0.
