= Robert Spencer, 4th Earl of Sunderland =

British peer (1701-1729)

Robert Spencer

Earl of Sunderland
- Tenure: 19 April 1722 – 15 September 1729
- Predecessor: Charles Spencer, 3rd Earl of Sunderland
- Successor: Charles Spencer, 3rd Duke of Marlborough
- Born: 24 October 1701
- Died: 15 September 1729 (aged 27)
- Noble family: Spencer
- Father: Charles Spencer, 3rd Earl of Sunderland
- Mother: Lady Anne Churchill

Robert Spencer, 4th Earl of Sunderland (24 October 1701 – 15 September 1729) was a British peer from the Spencer family, the son of Whig politician Charles Spencer, 3rd Earl of Sunderland. His mother was Lady Anne Churchill, the daughter of John Churchill, 1st Duke of Marlborough, and Sarah Churchill, Duchess of Marlborough. Known as Lord Spencer between 1702 and 1722, he succeeded to the Earldom after his father's death in 1722, but died in 1729 with no children. Therefore, his brother, Charles, became 5th Earl of Sunderland, and subsequently 3rd Duke of Marlborough after the death of his aunt, Henrietta Godolphin (née Churchill), 2nd Duchess of Marlborough.

Peerage of England
| Preceded by Charles Spencer | Earl of Sunderland; 1722 – 1729 | Succeeded by Charles Spencer |
