= Charles Spencer, 3rd Earl of Sunderland =

British politician (1675–1722)

The Right Honourable The Earl of Sunderland KG PC
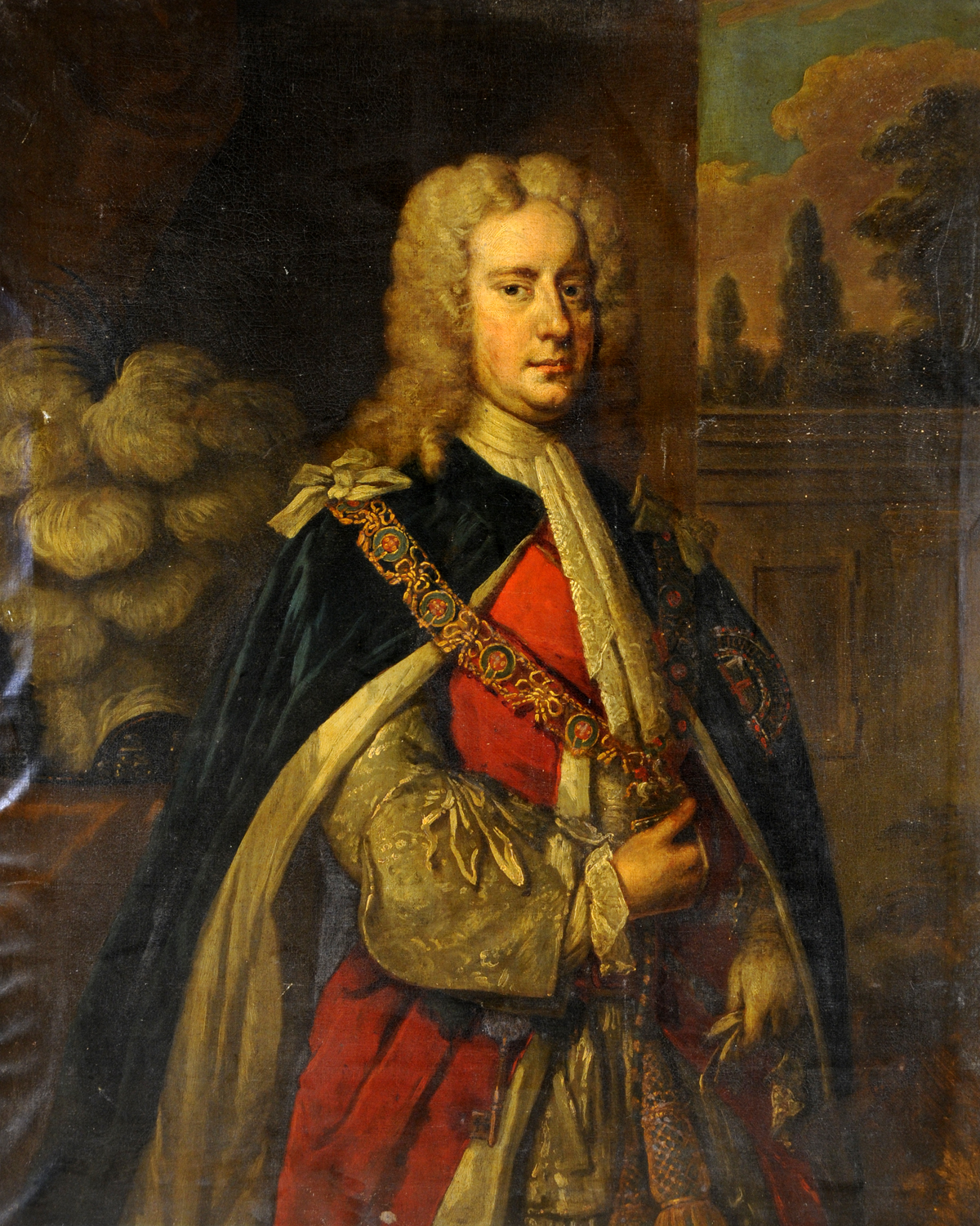
- Portrait by Godfrey Kneller

First Lord of the Treasury
- In office 21 March 1718 – 3 April 1721
- Monarch: George I
- Preceded by: The Viscount Stanhope
- Succeeded by: Robert Walpole

Lord President of the Council
- In office 16 March 1718 – 6 February 1719
- Monarch: George I
- Preceded by: The Duke of Devonshire
- Succeeded by: The Duke of Kingston-upon-Hull

Secretary of State for the Northern Department
- In office 12 April 1717 – 2 March 1718
- Monarch: George I
- Preceded by: James Stanhope
- Succeeded by: The Viscount Stanhope

Lord Privy Seal
- In office 31 August 1715 – 19 December 1716
- Monarch: George I
- Preceded by: The Marquess of Wharton (Note: In commission from 12 April 1715)
- Succeeded by: The Duke of Kingston-upon-Hull

Lord Lieutenant of Ireland
- In office 21 September 1714 – 6 September 1715
- Monarch: George I
- Preceded by: The Duke of Shrewsbury
- Succeeded by: Lords Justices

Secretary of State for the Southern Department
- In office 3 December 1706 – 13 June 1710
- Monarch: Anne
- Preceded by: Charles Hedges
- Succeeded by: The Lord Dartmouth

Personal details
- Born: Charles Spencer; 23 April 1675
- Died: 19 April 1722 (aged 46) London, Greater London, England
- Resting place: Brington, Northamptonshire, England
- Party: Whig
- Spouses: Arabella Cavendish (m. 1695–1698) Anne Churchill (m. 1700–1716) Judith Tichborne (m. 1717–1722)
- Children: 10, including Robert, Anne Spencer, Viscountess Bateman, Charles, John Spencer, and Diana Spencer, Duchess of Bedford
- Parent(s): Robert Spencer, 2nd Earl of Sunderland; Anne Digby
- Education: Utrecht University
- Occupation: Statesman

Charles Spencer, 3rd Earl of Sunderland, KG, PC (23 April 1675 – 19 April 1722), styled as Lord Spencer from 1688 to 1702, was a British politician from the Spencer family. He served as Lord Lieutenant of Ireland (1714–1717), Lord Privy Seal (1715–1716), Lord President of the Council (1718–1719) and First Lord of the Treasury (1718–1721). He is an ancestor of both Winston Churchill and Diana, Princess of Wales, and through her, the current heir to the British throne, William, Prince of Wales.

== Early life ==
He was the second son of Robert Spencer, 2nd Earl of Sunderland and Anne Digby, daughter of George Digby, 2nd Earl of Bristol. On the death of his elder brother Robert in Paris in September 1688, he became heir to the peerage. Called by John Evelyn "a youth of extraordinary hopes," he completed his education at Utrecht, and in 1695 entered the House of Commons as member for Tiverton. In the same year, he married Arabella, daughter of Henry Cavendish, 2nd Duke of Newcastle; she died in 1698 and in 1700, he married Anne Churchill, daughter of John Churchill, 1st Duke of Marlborough and Sarah Churchill, Duchess of Marlborough. This was an important alliance for Sunderland and for his descendants; through it, he was introduced to political life and later the dukedom of Marlborough came to the Spencers.

In 1698 he plunged his family into scandal when his brother-in-law Donogh MacCarthy, 4th Earl of Clancarty, who had been imprisoned in the Tower of London for his support for James II and later escaped, was reconciled with his long-estranged wife, Charles' sister Elizabeth, and at long last consummated the marriage. Charles, alerted by his father's servants, had Clancarty arrested while he was actually in bed with Elizabeth. The result was a public uproar which gravely embarrassed their parents. William III treated the matter as a trifle, wondering why everyone he met teased him about "that little spark Clancarty", and gave the couple permission to settle in Altona, Hamburg. Elizabeth, who died in Hamburg in 1704, never saw her parents or brother again. His father's biographer comments that the affair did not show Charles in a good light either as a man or a brother.

== Career ==
Having succeeded to the peerage in 1702, Sunderland was one of the commissioners for the union between England and Scotland, and in 1705, he was sent to Vienna as envoy extraordinary. Although he was tinged with republican ideas and had made himself obnoxious to Queen Anne by opposing the grant to her husband, Prince George, through the influence of Marlborough he was foisted into the ministry as Secretary of State for the Southern Department, taking office in December 1706.

From 1708 to 1710, he was one of the five Whigs collectively called the Junto, who dominated the government, but he had many enemies, the Queen still disliked him, and in June 1710, he was dismissed. Anne offered him a pension of £3000 a year, but this he refused, saying "if he could not have the honour to serve his country he would not plunder it." When Marlborough protested about the dismissal, the Queen inquired sarcastically whether "the Peace of Europe must depend on it?" She added that Sunderland was universally unpopular, which was indeed the case.

Sunderland continued to take part in public life, and was active in communicating with the court of Hanover about the steps to be taken in view of the approaching death of the queen. He made the acquaintance of George I in 1706, but when the elector became king, Sunderland only secured the comparatively unimportant position of Lord Lieutenant of Ireland. In August 1715, he joined the cabinet as Lord Privy Seal. After a visit to George I in Hanover, he secured, in April 1717, the position of Secretary of State for the Northern Department. This he retained until March 1718, when he became First Lord of the Treasury, holding also the post of Lord President of the Council. He was now effectively the prime minister. Sunderland was especially interested in the proposed Peerage Bill, a measure designed to limit the number of members of the House of Lords, but this was defeated owing partly to the opposition of Sir Robert Walpole.

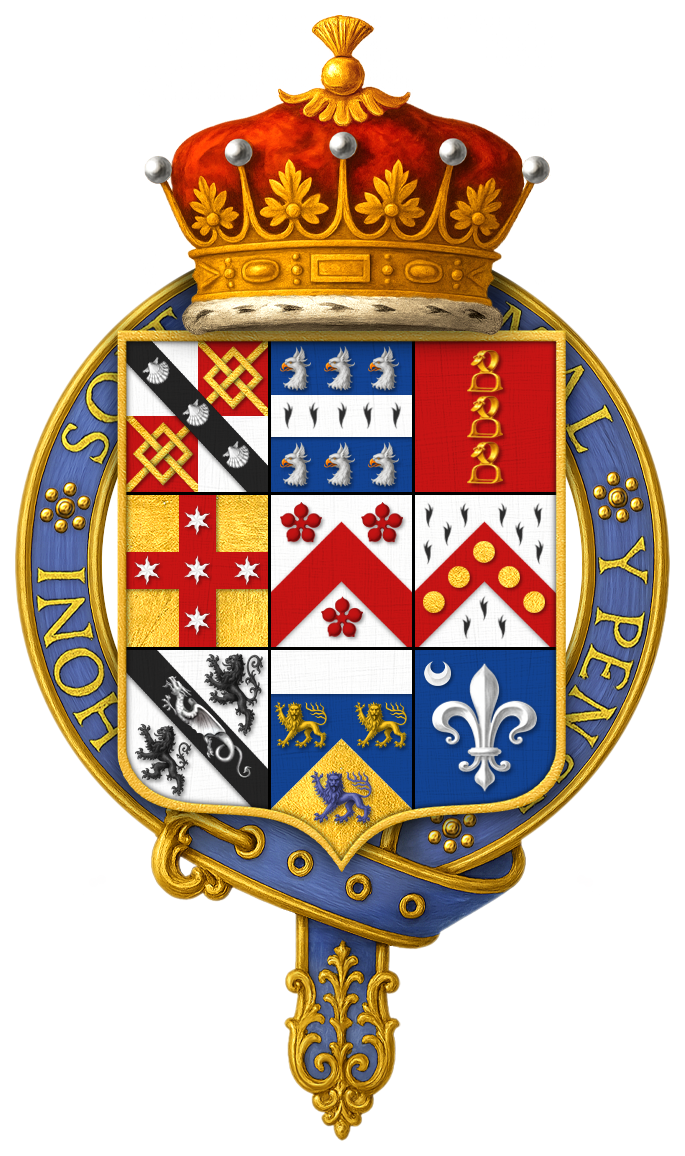
Quartered arms of Charles Spencer, 3rd Earl of Sunderland, KG, PC

In 1719, he succeeded Lionel Sackville, 1st Duke of Dorset in the court position as Groom of the Stool to King George I, which he held until his death in 1722. He was also made a knight of the Order of the Garter in 1719. He was also a main subscriber in the Royal Academy of Music, a corporation that produced baroque opera on stage.

The bursting of the South Sea Bubble led to his political ruin. He had taken some part in launching the scheme of 1720, therefore public opinion was roused against him and it was only through the efforts of Walpole that he was acquitted by the House of Commons, when the matter was investigated. In April 1721, he resigned his offices, but he retained his influence with George I until his own death on 19 April 1722.

Sunderland inherited his father's passion for intrigue, while his manners were repelling, but he stands high among his associates for disinterestedness and had an alert and discerning mind. From his early years, he had a great love of books, and he spent his leisure and his wealth in forming the library at Althorp, which in 1703 was described as "the finest in Europe." In 1749, part of it was removed to Blenheim Palace.

In 1722 Sunderland was implicated in what became known as the Atterbury Plot, to restore the House of Stuart, and his death was one of the factors which brought the Plot to light.

The town of Sunderland, Massachusetts, was named in his honour in November 1718, just after he became Lord President of the Council.

== Marriages and children ==
His first wife was Lady Arabella Cavendish (19 August 1673 – 4 June 1698), daughter of Henry Cavendish, 2nd Duke of Newcastle. They had one daughter:

- Lady Frances Spencer (c. 1696 – 27 July 1742), married Henry Howard, 4th Earl of Carlisle.

His second wife was Lady Anne Churchill (27 February 1683 – 15 April 1716). After the eldest sister Henrietta Churchill got married in 1698, Sarah Jenyns began arranging the marriage between her beloved daughter Anne and the young widower Charles. Charles's mother the Countess of Sunderland was a friend of Sarah. With this idea, Sarah could be credited with the foundation of the Spencer-Churchill family. Although the Countess of Sunderland supported the marriage, Sarah was hesitant over the match. Politically, the marriage of Anne Churchill and Charles Spencer was a good match, for Charles was a rising Whig star in Parliament. However, on a personal level Sarah found him unattractive, for his face had a giant smallpox scar. Her husband John Churchill, 1st Duke of Marlborough also disagreed with the match. As a result, the courtship between Charles and Anne dragged on for almost two years. On the other hand, the Duchess of Marlborough thought Charles Spencer did not love her daughter enough; but the Countess of Sunderland told Sarah that the beauty and sweetness of Anne had won her son's heart, and the Earl also gave Sarah a rash promise that Charles should be ruled by Marlborough in all things political. Finally, Sarah gave way and persuaded her husband to give permission to the marriage. On 2 January 1700, Anne Churchill married Charles Spencer. The Princess Anne gave her goddaughter a wedding gift of 5,000 pounds, as she had to Anne's elder sister Henrietta. Despite Sarah's misgivings, the marriage of her daughter to Charles was a happy one: Anne was a wonderful wife, and Charles loved her dearly. Anne died at the age of 33 in April 1716, after a career of considerable influence on the political life of her time. They had six children:

- Hon. Robert Spencer (2 December 1700 – 12 September 1701).
- Robert Spencer, 4th Earl of Sunderland (24 October 1701 – 27 November 1729).
- Lady Anne Spencer (1702 – 19 February 1769), married William Bateman, 1st Viscount Bateman.
- Charles Spencer, 5th Earl of Sunderland (22 November 1706 – 20 October 1758), succeeded his aunt, Henrietta Godolphin, 2nd Duchess of Marlborough, as 3rd Duke of Marlborough.
- Hon. John Spencer (13 May 1708 – 19 June 1746), father of John Spencer, 1st Earl Spencer.
- Lady Diana Spencer (1710 – 27 September 1735), married John Russell, 4th Duke of Bedford.

In 1717, Charles married an Irish lady of fortune, Judith Tichborne (c. 1702 – 17 May 1749), daughter of Sir Benjamin Tichborne of Beaulieu (younger brother of Sir Henry Tichborne, 1st Baron Ferrard, Irish cr. 1715) and Elizabeth Gibbs. They had three children who died in infancy:

- Unnamed child (born and died 1718).
- Lady Margaret Spencer (born and died 1719) - her coffin was removed from St James' Church London where she had been first been buried and interred at the family vault in Great Brington Church on the same day as her father's burial that of 1 May 1722
- Hon. William Spencer (1720 – 17 April 1722) - interred in the family vault in Great Brinton Church on the same day as his father that of 1 May 1722

After his death, she married Sir Robert Sutton (1671 – 13 August 1746).

== See also ==
- Kingdom of Great Britain

== Ancestry ==
Ancestors of Charles Spencer, 3rd Earl of Sunderland

8. William Spencer, 2nd Baron Spencer of Wormleighton
4. Henry Spencer, 1st Earl of Sunderland
9. Lady Penelope Wriothesley
2. Robert Spencer, 2nd Earl of Sunderland
10. Robert Sidney, 2nd Earl of Leicester
5. Lady Dorothy Sidney
11. Lady Dorothy Percy
1. Charles Spencer, 3rd Earl of Sunderland
12. John Digby, 1st Earl of Bristol
6. George Digby, 2nd Earl of Bristol
13. Beatrice Walcott
3. Lady Anne Digby
14. Francis Russell, 4th Earl of Bedford
7. Lady Anne Russell
15. Catherine Brydges

Parliament of England
Preceded by Thomas Bere; Anthony Keck	Member of Parliament for Tiverton; 1695–1702; With: Thomas Bere	Succeeded by Thomas Bere; Robert Burridge
Political offices
Preceded by Sir Charles Hedges	Secretary of State for the Southern Department; 1706–1710	Succeeded by The Lord Dartmouth
Preceded by The Duke of Shrewsbury	Lord Lieutenant of Ireland; 1714–1715	Succeeded by The Viscount Townshend
In commission Title last held by The Marquess of Wharton	Lord Privy Seal; 1715–1716	Succeeded by The Duke of Kingston
Preceded by James Stanhope	Secretary of State for the Northern Department; 1717–1718	Succeeded by The Viscount Stanhope
Preceded by The Duke of Devonshire	Lord President of the Council; 1718–1719	Succeeded by The Duke of Kingston-upon-Hull
Preceded by The Viscount Stanhope	First Lord of the Treasury; 1718–1721	Succeeded by Robert Walpole
Peerage of England
Preceded by Robert Spencer	Earl of Sunderland; Second creation 1702–1722	Succeeded by Robert Spencer
