= Sarah Churchill, Duchess of Marlborough =

English courtier, noblewoman and politician (1660–1744)

Her Grace The Duchess of Marlborough
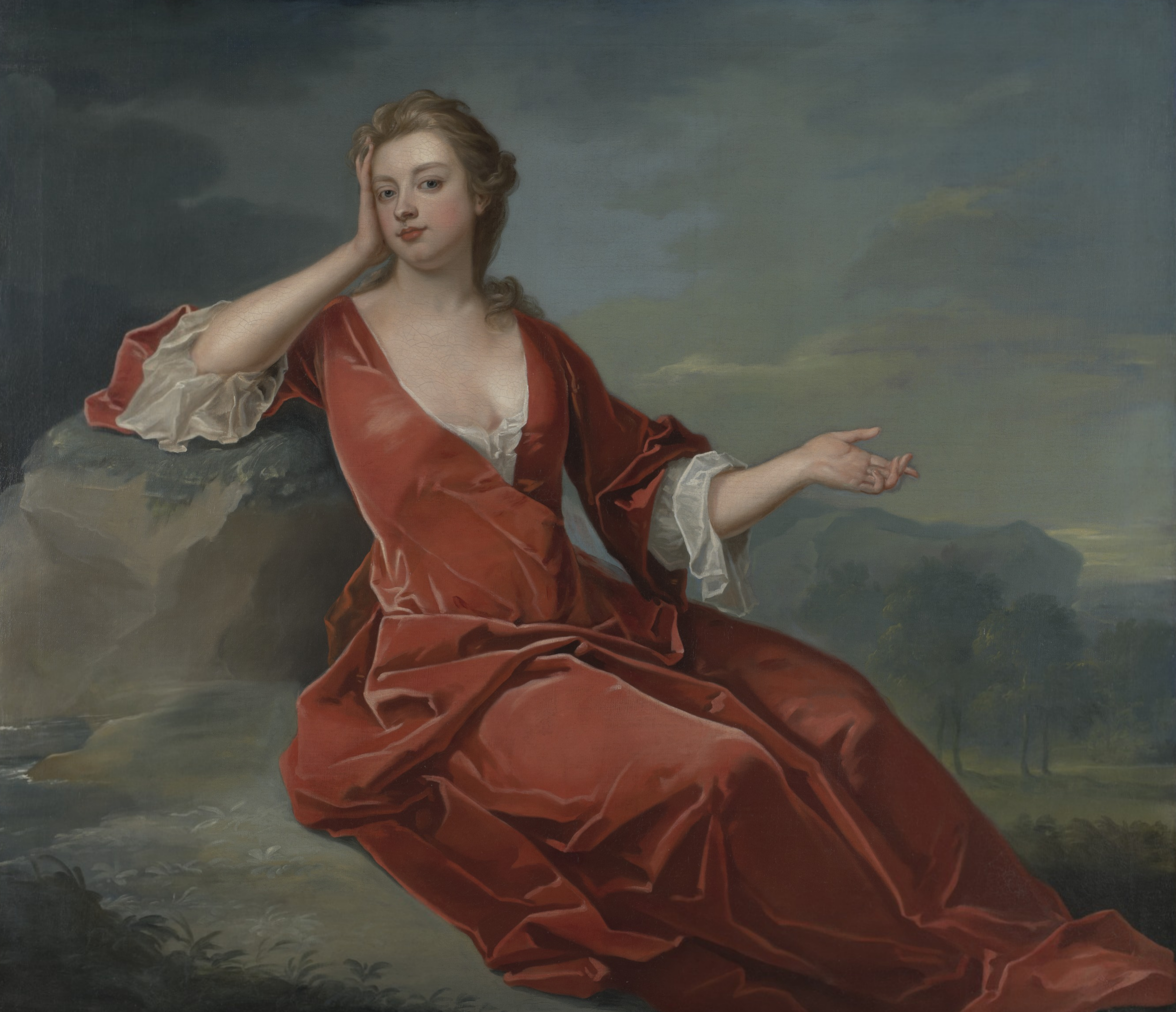
- Portrait by Charles Jervas, c. 1700

Keeper of the Privy Purse
- In office 1702–1711
- Monarch: Anne
- Preceded by: Caspar Henning
- Succeeded by: The Lady Masham

Personal details
- Born: Sarah Jenyns; 5 June 1660 St Albans, Hertfordshire, Kingdom of England
- Died: 18 October 1744 (aged 84) St James's, London, Kingdom of Great Britain
- Resting place: Blenheim Palace
- Spouse(s): John Churchill, 1st Duke of Marlborough (m. 1677/78; d. 1722)
- Children: 7, including: Henrietta Churchill, 2nd Duchess of Marlborough; Anne Churchill, Countess of Sunderland; John Churchill, Marquess of Blandford; Elizabeth Churchill, Countess of Bridgewater; Mary Churchill, Duchess of Montagu
- Parent(s): Richard Jennings; Frances Thornhurst
- Occupation: Mistress of the Robes to Anne, Queen of Great Britain

Sarah Churchill, Duchess of Marlborough (née Jenyns, spelt Jennings in most modern references; 5 June 1660 (Old Style) – 18 October 1744) was an English courtier and noblewoman who became one of the most influential women of her time through her close relationship with Anne, Queen of Great Britain. Churchill's influence on Anne was widely known, and leading public figures often turned their attentions to her, hoping to attain favour from the queen.

Churchill enjoyed a "long and devoted" relationship with her husband of more than 40 years, the general John Churchill, 1st Duke of Marlborough. After Anne's father, King James II, was deposed during the Glorious Revolution of 1688, Churchill acted as Anne's agent, promoting her interests during the reigns of William III and Mary II. When Anne came into power after William's death in 1702, John Churchill and Sidney Godolphin, 1st Earl of Godolphin, rose to head the government, partly owing to the Duchess.

While John Churchill was fighting in the War of the Spanish Succession, the Duchess kept him informed of court intrigues and conveyed his requests and political advice to the Queen. The Duchess campaigned tirelessly on behalf of the Whigs, while also devoting herself to building projects such as Blenheim Palace. However, her political ambitions strained her relationship with the Queen; their relationship ended in 1711, and the Duke and Duchess were dismissed from court. Later, Churchill had famous disagreements with many important people, including her daughter Henrietta Godolphin, 2nd Duchess of Marlborough; the architect of Blenheim Palace, John Vanbrugh; Prime Minister Robert Walpole; King George II; and Queen Caroline. The money she inherited from the Marlborough trust left her one of the richest women in Europe, and she possessed 27 estates at the time of her death. She died in 1744, aged 84, and was buried at Blenheim.

== Early life ==
Sarah Jennings was born into an impoverished gentry family on 5 June 1660, probably at Holywell House in St Albans, Hertfordshire. Her father was Richard Jennings (or Jenyns), a Member of Parliament; her mother was Frances Thornhurst, a daughter of Susanna Temple. Her paternal grandfather was Sir John Jennings, and her uncle Martin Lister was a prominent naturalist. She did not receive a formal education, and was insecure about her handwriting even into old age.

In 1664, Sarah's sister Frances was appointed a maid of honour to the Duke of York's (the future King James II) first wife, Anne Hyde, the Duchess of York. However, James forced Frances to give up the post because of her marriage to a Catholic, George Hamilton, in 1665. In 1673, when Sarah was 13, she entered court as maid of honour to James's second wife: Mary of Modena. Sarah did not enjoy being at court, but she stayed at her post so that she could acquire the dowry customarily given to maids of honour when they finished their service. Additionally, she was only given an annual salary of £20; maintaining her position cost upwards of £500 annually, as she had to follow the court from place to place, keep a personal maid, and buy new clothing for events. Sarah first became friends with the young Princess Anne, the daughter of the Duke of York, in 1674.

== Marriage ==
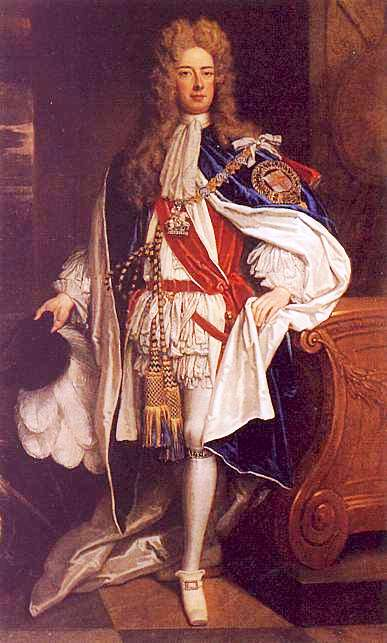
John Churchill, 1st Duke of Marlborough, in the robes of the Order of the Garter by Sir Godfrey Kneller, c. 1704

In late 1675, when she was fifteen, she met John Churchill, 10 years her senior, and the two fell in love. Churchill had previously been a lover of Charles II's mistress Barbara Palmer, 1st Duchess of Cleveland, and his estates were deeply in debt. Sarah had a rival for Churchill in Catherine Sedley, a wealthy mistress of James II and the choice of Churchill's father, Sir Winston Churchill, who was anxious to restore the family's fortune. John Churchill may have hoped to take Sarah as a mistress in place of the Duchess of Cleveland, who had recently departed for France, but surviving letters from Jennings to Churchill show her unwillingness to assume that role.

In 1677, Sarah's brother Ralph died, and she and her sisters Frances and Barbara became co-heirs of the family estates in Hertfordshire and Kent. Her sudden acquisition of wealth lessened the Churchills' opposition to the match, and John Churchill eventually chose Sarah over Catherine Sedley. Although no date was recorded, the couple married secretly in the winter of 1677–78. The marriage was announced only to the Duchess of York and a small circle of friends so that Sarah could keep her court position as maid of honour. Eventually her marriage was publicly announced on 1 October 1678 when she became pregnant.

=== Voluntary exile ===
In March 1679, the Duke of York, a Catholic and heir presumptive, went into self-imposed exile in Brussels as a result of the furore surrounding the Popish Plot. John accompanied him, and brought a pregnant Sarah to Brussels in late August after the first Parliament was dissolved without reaching an agreement on the Exclusion Crisis. She had barely settled in Brussels when the Duke and his entourage, including the Churchills, moved to Edinburgh. Shortly thereafter, Sarah gave birth to her first daughter Henrietta, nicknamed Harriet.

The Churchills were allowed to return to London in February 1680. Henrietta died in June, but Sarah gave birth to another daughter, also named Henrietta, in July. She then returned to Edinburgh in September, leaving the newborn in the care of a nurse. In Scotland, Sarah was able to renew her childhood friendship with Anne, who was visiting her father. When the couple returned to London for the final time, John's loyalty was awarded by being named Lord Churchill of Eyemouth in Scotland, and Sarah became Lady Churchill. Upon Anne's marriage Prince George of Denmark in 1683, Sarah was appointed her Lady of the Bedchamber.

The Churchills had five children who survived to adulthood. They were Henrietta Godolphin, 2nd Duchess of Marlborough, born in 1681; Anne Spencer, Countess of Sunderland, born in 1683; John Churchill, Marquess of Blandford, born in 1686; Elizabeth Churchill, Countess of Bridgewater, born in 1687; and Mary Montagu, Duchess of Montagu, born in 1689.

== Reign of James II ==
The Duke of York came into power following the death of Charles II in 1685, and was crowned King James II. His early reign was relatively successful; it was not expected that a Catholic king could assert control in a fiercely Protestant, anti-Catholic country. During this time, Anne and Sarah continued to share a strong friendship; after Lady Claredon was forced to resign her post, Anne promoted Sarah to Groom of the Stole, therefore increasing her influence and salary from £200 to £400. The two women invented pet names for themselves around this time, so that they could speak to each other as equals without the limitations of rank; Sarah was called "Mrs Freeman," and Anne was called "Mrs Morley."

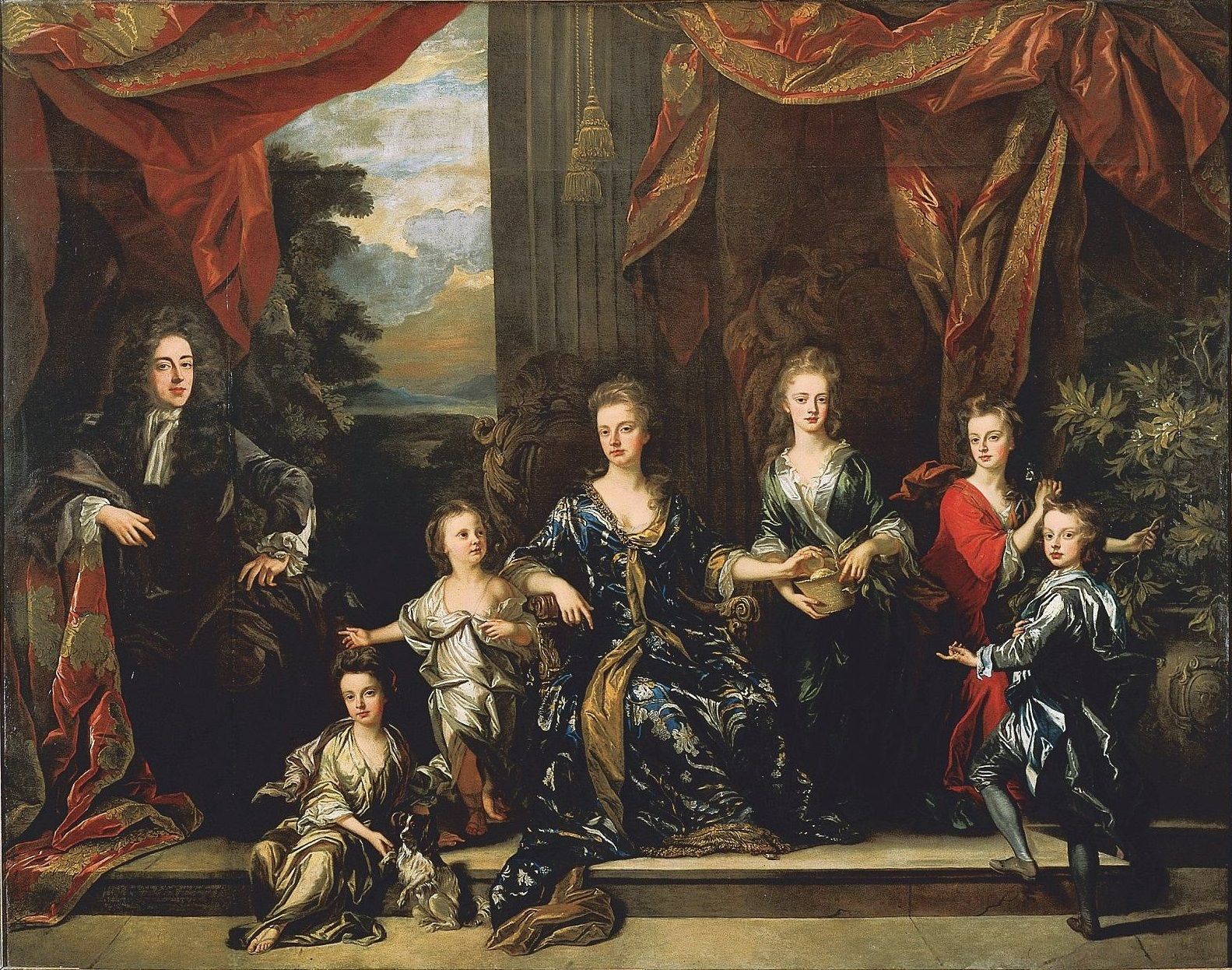
Portrait of the 1st Duke and Duchess of Marlborough with their family in 1697. From left to right: The Duke of Marlborough, Elizabeth, Mary, The Duchess of Marlborough, Henrietta, Anne and John.

In this post, Sarah appears to have had a virtual monopoly over Anne, as references to her character and immense influence over the Princess began to appear in foreign envoy's dispatches afterwards. However, Sarah was experiencing a growing discontent, and in a letter complained to the Princess that she had no time to do anything for herself. Additionally, Sarah began facing scrutiny from Anne's sister Mary, who believed she was too lax when it came to religion; Anne sided with her sister, and recommended that Sarah go to church more often.

When James attempted to reform the national religion, popular discontent against him and his government became widespread. James was beginning to become suspicious of the Churchills, and their influence over Anne, and the King's Catholic advisors began to press him to dismiss Sarah. In response, Sarah retreated from the public eye, using her pregnancy as an excuse. The level of alarm increased when Queen Mary of Modena gave birth to a son on 10 June 1688, Prince James Francis Edward, who would be raised Roman Catholic. A group of politicians known as the Immortal Seven invited Prince William III of Orange, the Protestant husband of James' daughter Mary, to invade England and remove James from power, a plan that became public knowledge very quickly. As John and Prince George participated in the scheme, Sarah was aware of it beforehand and fully supported her husband.

James still retained some influence, and he ordered that both Sarah and Anne be placed under house arrest at the Cockpit (Note: The Cockpit was the old Tudor Cock fighting area. It was converted into a residence and given to Anne by Charles II, after her marriage to Prince George of Denmark. It later became John and Sarah Churchill's private residence after Anne's accession, before becoming what is now the Cabinet Office at 70 Whitehall.) in the Palace of Whitehall. However, the pair escaped at night, and fled to Nottingham. Although Sarah implied that she had encouraged the escape for Anne's safety, it is more likely that she was protecting herself and her husband. If James had succeeded in defeating William, he might have imprisoned or even executed the Churchills for treason, but it was unlikely he would have condemned his daughter to a similar fate. James fled to France in December 1688, which allowed William and Mary to take the throne.

== Reign of William III and Mary II ==
During the reign of King William III and Queen Mary II, John Churchill was awarded the title Earl of Marlborough. However, the new earl and countess enjoyed considerably less favour than they had during the reign of James II. John Churchill had supported the now exiled James, and by this time, Sarah's influence on Anne, and her cultivation of high members of the government to promote Anne's interests, was widely known.

Other problems also emerged. In 1689, Anne's supporters— including the Marlboroughs and the Duke of Somerset— demanded that she be granted a parliamentary annuity of £50,000, a sum that would end her dependence on William and Mary. Sarah was seen as the driving force behind this bill, creating further ill-feeling towards her at court. Mary sent Lady Barbara Fitzhardinge to threaten Sarah and her husband with ruin if she did not back down and side with the Queen, but Sarah refused. William responded to the demand by offering the same sum from the Privy Purse to keep Anne dependent on his generosity. However, Anne, through the Countess, refused, as a parliamentary grant would be more secure than charity from the Privy Purse. Eventually Anne received the grant from Parliament and felt she owed this to Sarah's efforts; as a reward, Sarah's income was increased from £400 to £1,400.

Anne's disagreements over her income with William and Mary drove a wedge between the sisters that lasted over a year. Mary claimed that she would have tried to apologize and reconcile with Anne, but that Anne "was so absolutly governed by Lady Marlborough that it was to no purpose." Sarah was aware that she had damaged her reputation at court, and she retired to their home in St Albans after giving birth to her second son, Charles, in August. There, she took a new interest in literature, and built a large library.

=== Removal from court ===
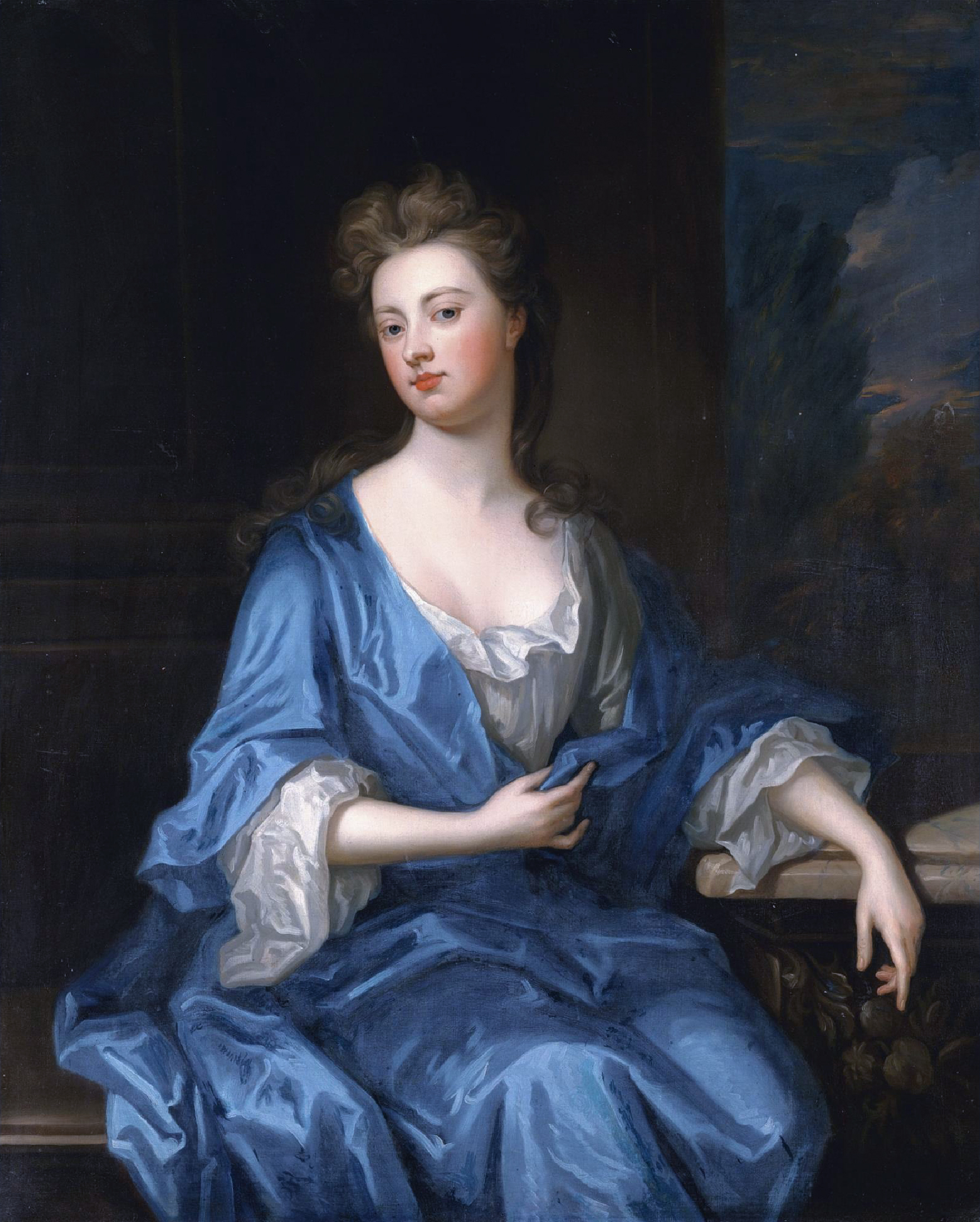
Portrait of the Duchess of Marlborough attributed to Godfrey Kneller, c. 1700.

On 20 January 1692, John was suddenly dismissed from his post; following this, Sarah was expected to resign or be dismissed from Anne's service. However, the Princess did not act, and Sarah continued to wait on her as usual. In response, Mary wrote to her sister and demanded that she dismiss Sarah from her service, but Anne refused. Although Mary and William could not dismiss Sarah themselves, they insisted that the Lord Chamberlain order Sarah to leave her post and accommodations at court. Anne responded by leaving the court as well, and the pair went to stay with their friends, the Duke and Duchess of Somerset, at Syon House where the Lord Chamberlain did not have jurisdiction. The Queen was further enraged; she stripped Anne of her royal honours, removed her guard, and forbade all members of her court from visiting the princess.

Anne continued to defy Mary's demands for Sarah's dismissal, even after a document signed by John supporting the recently exiled James II was discovered in 1692. This document is likely to have been forged by Robert Young, a known forger and disciple of Titus Oates; Oates was famous for having stirred a strongly anti-Catholic atmosphere in England between 1679 and the early 1680s. John was arrested under suspicion of being a Jacobite and imprisoned in the Tower of London. However, he was later exonerated and released in June when Young's forgeries were exposed. The couple moved back to their home in St Albans, where Sarah lived for the majority of the next two years.

=== Return to court ===
Following Mary's death from smallpox in December 1694, Anne became heir apparent, and William III restored her honours and provided her with apartments at St. James's Palace. However, William kept Anne out of government affairs and did not make her regent. While Sarah avoided seeing the King, John was admitted to see him in March, marking the Marlboroughs' return to court life. They moved into new lodgings in the southeastern corner of St James's Palace in December 1695, and Sarah was welcomed by the King shortly afterwards.

In 1701, John was appointed Ambassador-Extraordinary and travelled to the Hague to aid the Dutch against the French. Sarah joined him briefly, but her unpredictable and impolite behaviour caused John to send her back to England; afterwards, she was not allowed to accompany him abroad in an official capacity again. In England, Sarah leveraged their new favour to make successful marriages for her children. In 1698, Henrietta was married to Francis Godolphin, the eldest son of the Marlborough's close friend and statesman, Sidney Godolphin. In 1699, Anne was married to Charles Spencer, eldest son of Robert Spencer, the 2nd Earl of Sunderland. Anne contributed £5,000 to each of their dowries.

== Reign of Anne ==
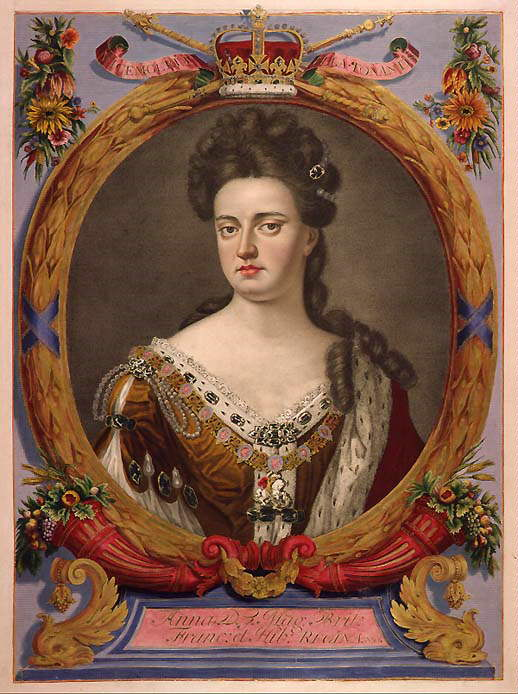
Sarah Churchill had an influential role during the reign of Queen Anne (pictured).

When William III died in March 1702, Anne was proclaimed Queen and crowned on 23 April. Sarah was promptly named Mistress of the Robes, the highest office in the royal court that could be held by a woman. She was also named Keeper of the Privy Purse, Groom of the Stool, and Ranger of Windsor Great Park. She was the first of only two women ever to be Keeper of the Privy Purse, and the only woman ever to be Ranger of Windsor Great Park. In these offices, the Duchess had immense control over the Queen's life, from her finances to people admitted to the royal presence. John accepted the Order of the Garter as well as the office of Captain-General of the army.

John was additionally offered a dukedom, which Sarah initially opposed; at the time, ducal families were expected to show off their wealth and rank through lavish clothing and entertainment, and she was concerned such activities would strain their finances. Anne countered by offering the Churchills a pension of £5,000 a year for life from Parliament, as well as an extra £2,000 a year from the Privy Purse. They accepted, and were named the Duke and Duchess of Marlborough.

Sarah leveraged the family's new position to make advantageous marriages for her youngest daughters, Elizabeth and Mary. Though the Duchess had typically been against child marriages, she was flattered by her daughters' prospects. In 1703, Elizabeth married to Scroop Egerton, then Earl of Bridgewater, when she was fourteen. Sarah began entertaining proposals for Mary when she was twelve; Mary married John Montagu, 2nd Duke of Montagu, in 1705 when she was sixteen. Anne again gifted £5,000 to each of the girls' dowries. Later in life, the Duchess expressed regret at having bound "two poor creatures to one another for life at fourteen before either of them know what it is to like or the misery of having reason to dislike what they are bound to."

The Duchess was called to Cambridge in 1703, where her only surviving son, John, Marquess of Blandford, was taken ill with smallpox. The Duke was recalled from the war and was at his bedside when he died on 20 February 1703. The Duchess was heartbroken over the loss of her son and became reclusive for a period, expressing her grief by closing herself off from Anne and either not answering her letters or doing so in a cold and formal manner.

During much of Anne's reign, the Duke was abroad fighting in the War of the Spanish Succession while Sarah remained in England. After the Duke's victory over the French at the Battle of Blenheim in 1704, Anne gifted the Marlboroughs the old Royal Manor and Park in Woodstock, Oxfordshire, totaling around 15,000 acres. She also pledged the money to plan and build a new estate at Woodstock, and appointed John Vanbrugh as the principal architect. In 1705, the Duchess began to oversee on the construction of Blenheim Palace, and from then on, she rarely appeared at court. Sarah and Vanbrugh frequently butted heads, often over the project's massive cost, which she called "ridiculous;" the frequent delays, and her belief that Vanbrugh was being deceptive and overly extravagant. Nevertheless, Anne sent her news of political developments in letters and consulted the Duchess' advice in most matters.

=== Wavering influence ===
Anne eventually began to withdraw her affections. She was frustrated by Sarah's long absences from court, and the Duchess was famous for telling the Queen exactly what she thought, without concern for her feelings. Sarah's frankness and indifference for rank, so admired by Anne earlier in their friendship, was now seen to be intrusive. The Duchess was always ready to give advice, express her opinions, and antagonize others; she insisted on having her say on every possible occasion, as it was impossible for her to fake indifference. Additionally, she had a fierce temper, and would fly into a rage if she was contradicted or denied something she wanted.

There were also stark political differences. The Queen was a Tory— also known as the "Church party—" as religion was one of Anne's chief concerns. Sarah aligned herself with the Whigs: the party that supported Marlborough's wars. Anne saw the Whigs as a threat to her royal prerogative. One major political disagreement occurred when the Duchess insisted that her son-in-law Charles Spencer, 3rd Earl of Sunderland, a Whig politician, be admitted into the Privy Council. Anne initially refused to appoint Sunderland. However, Sarah continued to lobby the Queen, and sent Whig reading materials to her to attempt to win her over. She additionally leveraged her close friendship with Sidney Godolphin, 1st Earl of Godolphin, whom Anne trusted, to eventually secure the appointment. However, Sarah and Godolphin's relationship became strained as well; he considered her bossy, interfering, and disliked that she tried to tell him what to do when the Duke was away.

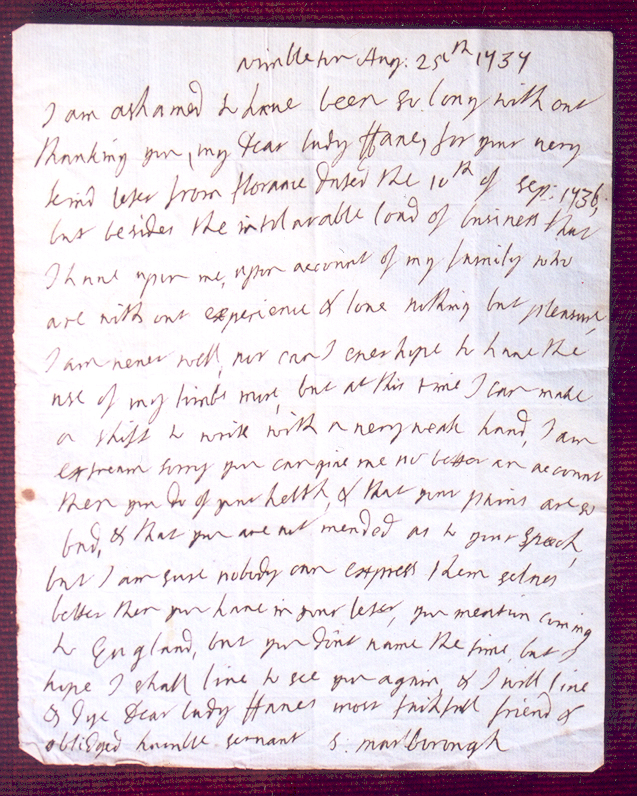
Letter from the Duchess of Marlborough to Lady Fane, Wimbledon, 15 August 1737. It is a good example of Sarah Churchill's typically jagged cursive handwriting.

==== Abigail Masham ====
The Duchess had previously introduced her impoverished cousin, then known as Abigail Hill, to court, with the intention of finding a role for her. Abigail, the eldest daughter of Sarah's aunt Elizabeth Hill (née Jennings), was working as a servant to Sir John Rivers of Kent when the Duchess first learned of her existence. Sarah's grandfather Sir John Jennings had fathered twenty-two children, and there was a multitude of cousins she did not know. The Duchess gave Abigail employment within her own household at St Albans, and after a tenure of satisfactory service, she was made a Lady of the Bedchamber to Queen Anne in 1704. The Duchess later claimed in her memoirs that she had raised Abigail "in all regards as a sister," though there were implications that she only assisted her cousin out of embarrassment of her difficult circumstances.

During the Duchess' frequent absences from court, Anne responded positively to Abigail's charm, and the pair grew close. Not only was Abigail happy to give the Queen the kindness and compassion that Anne had longed for from the Duchess, but she also cared for the Queen when she was bedridden with 'gout.' Abigail was also second cousin of the Tory leader Robert Harley, later first Earl of Oxford and Mortimer, who was also gaining influence over the queen. Sarah was initially oblivious to any friendship between Anne and Abigail, and was therefore surprised when she later discovered that Abigail had replaced her as the Queen's favourite.

In 1707, the Queen was present at Abigail's secret wedding to Samuel Masham, Prince George's Groom of the Bedchamber. The Duchess found out about Masham's marriage several months after it had occurred, and immediately went to see Anne with the intention of informing her of the event. It was during this meeting that Anne let slip that she had begged Abigail to tell Sarah of the marriage. The Duchess became suspicious about what had really happened; she questioned servants and the Royal Household about the event, and discovered that the Queen had been present. It was also revealed that Anne had given Abigail a dowry of £2,000 from the Privy Purse. Despite being Keeper of the Privy Purse, the Duchess had been unaware of any such payment. She also discovered that Abigail and Anne met in private for around 2 hours almost every day, and Abigail often visited the Queen when the Prince was asleep.

Sarah became increasingly jealous of Abigail's influence with Anne, which she believed to be the cause for the Queen's change in attitude towards her. Additionally, she believed that Abigail and Harley were secretly working together to push a Tory agenda. She wrote a letter warning the Queen that there were rumors of Anne harboring a "strange and unaccountable" passion for Abigail, insinuating that the Queen was in a lesbian relationship. Alongside the Duke and members of the Whig party, she tried to force Anne to dismiss Abigail. All these attempts failed, even when Anne was threatened with an official parliamentary demand from the Whigs, who were suspicious of Masham's Tory influence. The whole scenario echoed Anne's refusal to give up Sarah during the reign of William and Mary, but the threat of parliamentary interference exceeded anything tried against Anne in the 1690s.

=== Further strain ===
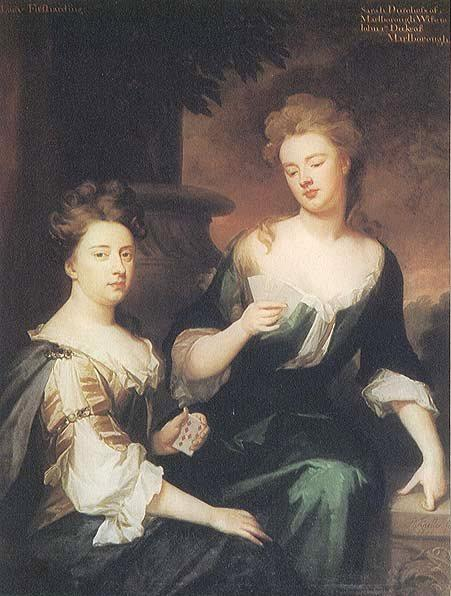
The Duchess of Marlborough (right) playing cards with her close friend, Barbara, Lady Fitzharding, by Sir Godfrey Kneller, c. 1702

In July 1708, the Duke of Marlborough and his ally Prince Eugene of Savoy won a great victory at the Battle of Oudenarde. As Mistress of the Robes, Sarah was in charge of the Queen's clothing and jewelry; however, Anne did not wear the jewels the Duchess had selected for her, and instead chose to wear those laid out for her by Abigail. On the way to the thanksgiving service at St Paul's Cathedral, Sarah argued with Anne about the jewels, and showed her a letter from John which expressed hope that the Queen would make good political use of the victory. The implication that she should publicly express her support for the Whigs offended Anne. Later at the service, the Duchess told the Queen to "be quiet" after Anne continued the argument, thus offending the Queen still further.

After the death of Prince George in 1708, the Duchess arrived at Kensington Palace. There, she found Anne with the prince's body, and pressed the Queen to move from Kensington to St James's Palace. Anne refused, and instead commanded Sarah to call Abigail to attend her. Aware that Masham was gaining more influence with Anne, the Duchess disobeyed, and instead scolded her for grieving over Prince George's death. Although Anne eventually submitted and allowed herself to be taken to St James's Palace, the Duchess's insensitivity greatly offended her and added to the already significant strain on their relationship. Additionally, during the mourning period, the Duchess refused to wear suitable mourning clothes. This gave the impression that she did not consider Anne's grief over his death to be genuine.

=== Final dismissal ===
The Duchess's last attempt to re-establish her friendship with Anne came in April 1710 when they had their final meeting. The women were estranged, and Sarah had written regularly to the Queen in an attempt to meet with her, but the Queen continuously avoided her. Eventually, Sarah forced a meeting at Kensington Palace. An account written by the Duchess shortly afterwards shows that she pleaded to be given an explanation of why their friendship was coming to an end; Anne was unmoved and repeated the phrase: "you may put it in writing" and "you desired no answer, and you shall have none." The Duchess was so appalled by the Queen's conduct that she was reduced to tears, and ended by threatening the Queen with the judgment of God, stating that "she would suffer in this world or the next for so much inhumanity." To this Anne replied, '"that would be to herself." Afterwards, the Duchess retired to Holywell; aware of their precarious situation, as their positions were closely tied to Sarah's favor with the Queen, John and Godolphin urged her not to interact with Anne or write to her.

Anne did not wish the public to know that her relationship with the Duchess of Marlborough was failing, because any sign that the Duchess was out of favour would have a damaging impact on the Duke's authority as Captain-General. Resultantly, the Duchess was kept in all of her offices. However, news of Sarah's conduct with the Queen had begun to spread, and it became obvious that Sarah would not simply be dismissed, but publicly disgraced. The Duchess decided that she would soften the blow to her reputation by compiling the Queen's letters and an account of her relationship with Anne, including Anne's promises to never part with her, into a book called History of Mrs Morley. The Queen was informed of these threats, and was warned not to provoke Sarah by dismissing her; however, Anne had lost her patience. She agreed to let Sarah keep her post until the Duke returned from his campaign, as long as the Duchess dropped the threats to publish.

When the Duke returned from the Hague, he attempted to keep his wife in her posts by bringing a letter of apology from Sarah to the Queen. However, Anne told the Duke that "for her [Anne's] honour" the Duchess was to resign immediately and return her gold key— the symbol of her authority within the royal household— within two days. When told the news, the Duchess, in a fit of pride, told the Duke to return the key to the Queen immediately.

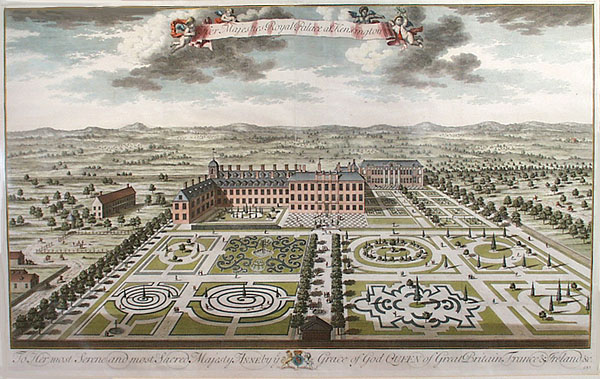
Kensington Palace, where the Duchess of Marlborough and Queen Anne met for the last time, as it looked in Anne's time

In January 1711, the Duchess lost the offices of Mistress of the Robes and Groom of the Stool and was replaced by Elizabeth Seymour, Duchess of Somerset. Abigail Masham was made Keeper of the Privy Purse. This broke a promise Anne had made to distribute these court offices to the Duchess of Marlborough's children. Additionally, because of the mass support for peace in the War of the Spanish Succession, Anne decided she no longer needed John and took the opportunity to dismiss him on trumped-up charges of embezzlement. The Marlboroughs also lost state funding for Blenheim Palace, and the Queen ordered all work to cease in 1712.

==== Travels in Europe ====
The couple left England and travelled across Europe, settling in Frankfurt am Main in 1713. As a result of his success in the War of the Spanish Succession, the Duke was a popular guest in the courts of Germany and the Holy Roman Empire, where the family was received with full honours. The Duchess, however, did not like being away from England and often complained that, while she and the Duke were received with full honours in Europe, they were in disgrace at home. The Duchess found life travelling the royal courts difficult, remarking that they were full of dull company. She took the waters at Aachen in Germany on account of her ill health, corresponded with those in England who could supply her with political gossip, and indulged in her fascination with Catholicism. Elizabeth Churchill died of smallpox on 22 March 1714 while the Marlboroughs were living abroad.

Sarah and Anne never made up their differences, although one eyewitness claimed to have heard Anne asking whether the Marlboroughs had reached the shore, leading to rumours that she had called them home herself. After a long period of ill health, Anne died at age 49 on 1 August 1714.

== Later years ==
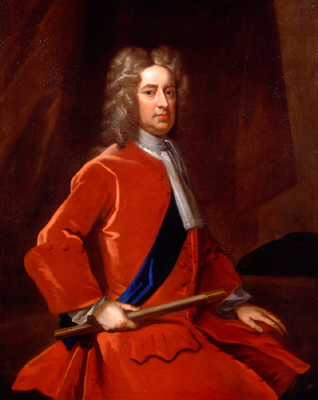
The Duke of Marlborough, painted after his stroke. Painted by Enoch Seeman in 1719 or 1720

The Marlboroughs returned to England in 1714, on the afternoon of Anne's death. The Act of Settlement 1701 ensured a Protestant succession by passing over more than 50 stronger Catholic claimants and proclaiming George Ludwig— the great-grandson of James I through George's mother Sophia of Hanover— King George I of Great Britain. The new reign was supported by the Whigs, who were mostly staunch Protestants. George rewarded said support by forming a majority Whig government; at his welcome in Queen's House at Greenwich, he conversed with the Whigs but not with the Tories. Sarah approved of his choice of Whig ministers.

King George also had a personal friendship with the Marlboroughs; the Duke had fought with him in the War of the Spanish Succession, and John and Sarah made frequent visits to the Hanoverian court during their effective exile from England. After being crowned, George's first words to John were: "My lord Duke, I hope your troubles are now over." The Duke was restored to his old office of Captain-General of the Army, and became one of the king's close advisers. Sarah was cordial with the King's daughter-in-law, Queen Caroline, and informed her on court customs when she first arrived. However, she detested the new King, who she believed was rude and vain.

The Duchess had a good relationship with her daughter Anne Spencer, Countess of Sunderland, whereas she later became estranged from her daughters Henrietta, Elizabeth, and Mary due to their frequent disagreements and arguments. The Marlboroughs were heartbroken when Anne died in 1716. Shortly afterwards, John had two strokes, the second of which left him without the ability to speak. The Duchess spent much of her time with him, accompanying him to Tunbridge Wells and Bath, and he recovered. Even after his recovery, the Duchess opened his correspondence and filtered the letters the Duke received, lest their contents precipitate another stroke.

=== Death of the Duke ===
The Duke died at Windsor in 1722, and the Duchess arranged a large funeral for him. Their daughter Henrietta became duchess in her own right. Sarah, now a Dowager Duchess, became one of the trustees of the Marlborough estate. Her personal income was now considerable, and she used the money to invest in land; she believed this would protect her from currency devaluation. Sarah was a capable business manager, unusual in a period when women were excluded from most things outside the management of their household. Her friend Arthur Maynwaring wrote that she was more capable of business than any man.

The Duchess never lost her good looks and, despite her failing popularity, received many offers of marriage after the death of her husband, including one from her old enemy, the Duke of Somerset. Ultimately, she decided against remarriage, preferring to keep her independence.

=== Family ===
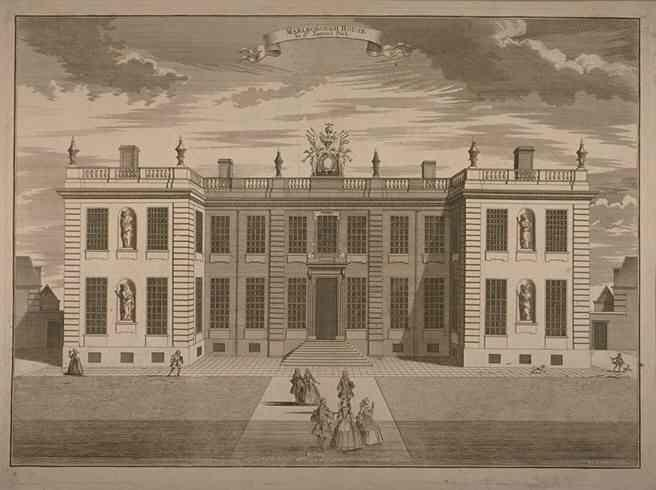
Marlborough House in its original form: the Duchess's favourite home in Pall Mall, London

After she moved back to England, Sarah became invested in the lives of her grandchildren. She attempted to find her eldest granddaughter, Lady Henrietta Godolphin, a suitable marriage partner. She originally had her sights set on the Earl of Clare, but the proposal was broken off when he demanded a dowry of £40,000. In April 1717, Henrietta married Thomas Pelham-Holles, 1st Duke of Newcastle-upon-Tyne. While Sarah herself often dressed fairly plainly, she had a massive collection of expensive jewelry, and would give them to her children and grandchildren to bolster their dowries, or improve their reception at court. When Henrietta entered society, Sarah purchased new clothes from Paris for her, and gave her multiple pieces of jewelry. The Duchess also gave jewelry to Georgiana Carteret, including a pearl necklace bought from the Duchess of Beaufort, to wear at her wedding to Sarah's grandson, John Spencer.

The Duchess adopted the Sunderlands' youngest child, Diana Spencer, after her father died in 1722. Diana and John were her favourite grandchildren; she had strained relationships with the rest, particularly Anne Bateman and Charles Spencer. The rift was due to Charles marrying Elizabeth Trevor, whom Anne had introduced to him— Elizabeth was the daughter of Thomas Trevor, an enemy of the Duke's.

==== Diana Spencer ====
In the 1730s, rumors began to circulate that the Duchess was plotting to arrange a marriage between Diana and King George's heir apparent: Frederick, Prince of Wales. Frederick was in severe debt, and in exchange, the Duchess was planning to pay a massive dowry of £100,000. A date had been agreed on, and the ceremony was supposed to take place in the lodge of Windsor Great Park. However, Robert Walpole, First Lord of the Treasury, who preferred a European match for Frederick, learned of the plot and prevented the plan from moving forward. This led to a further deterioration of his relationship with the Duchess, who was already his rival. Walpole, although a Whig, had alienated Sarah by supporting peace in Europe; she was suspicious of his financial probity and Walpole, in turn, mistrusted her. Diana eventually married John Russell, 4th Duke of Bedford, in 1731.

Diana died shortly after her marriage in 1735. In her will, Sarah had stipulated that, if Diana died before her without producing an heir, all of the money and jewelry given to the couple had to be returned. Sarah wrote to the widowed Duke, accusing him of being deceitful and taking too long to return the jewelry and £100,000. Lord Hervey, however, accused the Duchess of caring more about the jewels than her granddaughter, which he claims she demanded back before Diana was buried.

=== Blenheim Palace ===
Although she never came to like Blenheim Palace— describing it as "that great heap of stones"— she eventually became more enthusiastic about its construction. While she was generally against anything she found extravagant, she had two elaborate features constructed at the Palace: the Marlboroughs' tomb in Blenheim chapel, designed by William Kent, and the Doric Column of Victory in the park, designed by Henry Herbert, 9th Earl of Pembroke, and finished by Roger Morris. The latter rose to a height of 130 feet (40 m), complete with fine embellishments. The Duchess carefully monitored the construction of all Blenheim's features and she fell out with anyone who did not do exactly what she wanted.

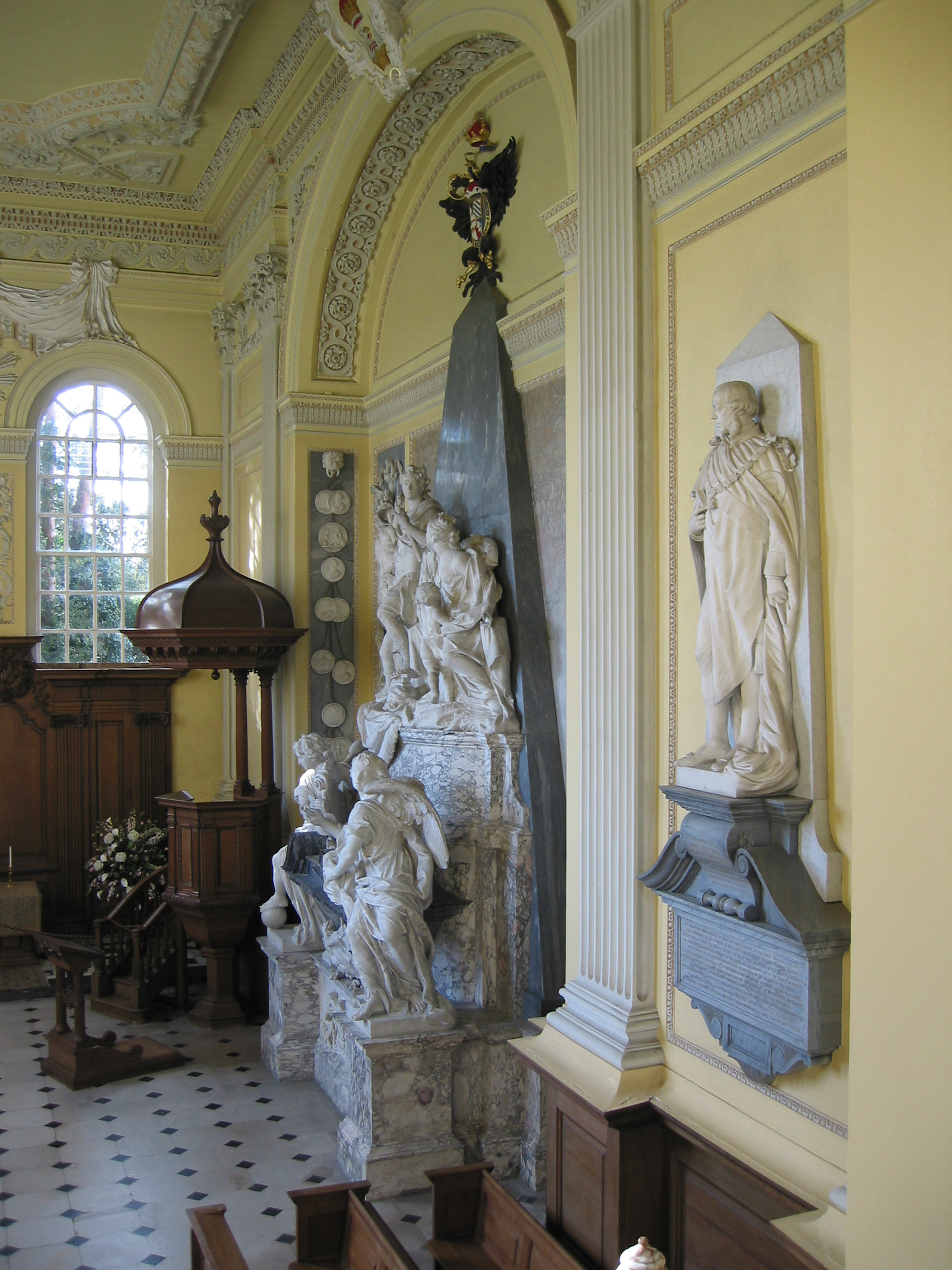
The Duke and Duchess of Marlborough's tomb in the chapel at Blenheim Palace, designed by William Kent

The construction of Blenheim was plagued by delays and funding issues, and by 1715, the cost of the project had exceeded £200,000— over £100,000 more than the original price estimate— and it was still unfinished. While the treasury allotted another £16,000 towards the construction in 1715, it became increasingly difficult for the duchess to procure additional funds. Contractors working on the construction filed a suit against the Marlboroughs for a sum of £29,000, much of which had been owed since 1710. While Sarah placed all blame on Vanbrugh and declared him legally responsible for the debt, the Barons of Exchequer ruled against the Marlboroughs in 1719, and deemed them financially responsible. However, the Duchess continued to appeal against court decisions which ruled that funding for Blenheim should come from their personal estate, and not the government. By the time the palace was completed in 1725, the total cost exceeded £300,000.

These detailed inspections extended to the Duchess's other land purchases and renovations. She purchased Wimbledon manor in 1723, and rebuilt the manor house. She also purchased Holdenby House near Althorp. Sarah kept detailed accounts of her finances and expenditure, and closely monitored her agents for any dishonesty.

=== Other Relationships ===
The Duchess's friendship with Queen Caroline ended when she refused the Queen access through her Wimbledon estate, which resulted in the loss of her £500 annual income as Ranger of Windsor Great Park. Sarah was also rude to King George II— claiming that he was "too much of a German"— which further alienated her from the court. Her persona non-grata status at the Walpole-controlled court prevented her from suppressing the rise of the Tories; Walpole's taxes and peace with Spain were deeply unpopular with ruling-class English society, and the Tories were gaining more support as a result. However, Sarah lived to see Walpole's fall from grace in 1742, and in the same year attempted to improve her reputation by approving a biographical publication titled An Account of the Dowager Duchess of Marlborough from her first coming to Court to the year 1710.

Sarah died at the age of 84, on 18 October 1744, at Marlborough House. She was buried at Blenheim, and her husband's body was exhumed from Westminster Abbey and buried beside her.

== Assessment ==
Although the Duchess of Marlborough's downfall is primarily attributed to her own self-serving relationship with Queen Anne, she promoted Anne's interests when she was princess. The Duchess believed that she had a right to enforce her political advice regardless of Anne's opinions. She seems to have underestimated Anne's strength of character, continuing to believe she could dominate a woman whom foreign ambassadors noted had become "very determined and quite ferocious". Apart from her notorious bad temper, the Duchess's main weakness has been described as "an almost pathological inability to admit the validity of anyone else's point of view".

Abigail Masham also played a key role in the Duchess's downfall. Modest and retiring, she promoted the Tory policies of her cousin Robert Harley. Despite Masham's owing her position at court to the Duchess of Marlborough, the Duchess soon saw Masham as her enemy who supplanted her in Anne's affections when the Duchess spent more and more time away from the Queen.

During her lifetime, the Duchess of Marlborough drafted 26 wills, the last of which was written only a few months before her death, and purchased 27 estates. With a wealth of over £4 million in land, £17,000 in rent rolls, and a further £12,500 in annuities, she made financial bequests to rising Whig ministers such as William Pitt, later the first Earl of Chatham, and Philip Stanhope, 4th Earl of Chesterfield. Although she left little to the poor and even less to charity, she left her servants' annuities far above the average for the time; her favourite, Grace Ridley, received £16,000, equivalent to approximately £1.32 million in today's money.

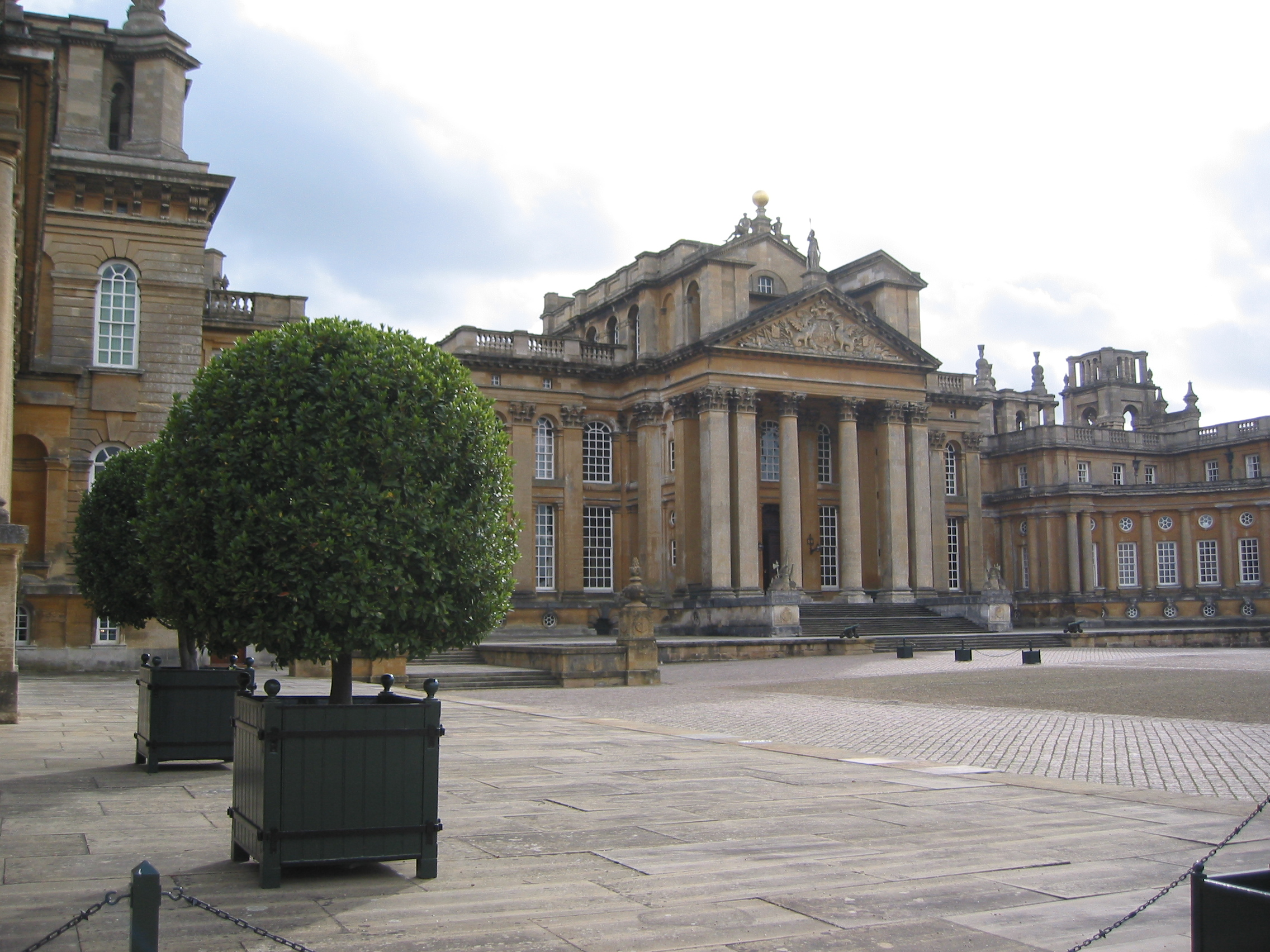
The main front of Blenheim Palace, in the construction of which the Duchess of Marlborough was heavily involved

Much of the money left after the Duchess's numerous bequests was inherited by her grandson John Spencer, with the condition that he could not accept a political office under the government. He also inherited the remainder of the Duchess's numerous estates, including Wimbledon. Marlborough House remained empty for 14 years, with the exception of James Stephens, one of her executors, before it became the property of the Dukes of Marlborough upon Stephens's death.

In 1817, Marlborough House became a royal residence, and passed through members of the British royal family until it became the Commonwealth Secretariat in 1959. Wimbledon Park House succumbed to fire in 1785, and Holywell House, the Duchess of Marlborough's birthplace in St Albans, was demolished in 1827. Today, much of St Albans is named after the Marlboroughs because of the Duchess' influence.

The Duchess died, in the words of Tobias Smollett, "immensely rich and very little regretted, either by her own family or the world in general".

== In popular culture ==
In her own time, Sarah Churchill was satirised by many well-known writers in the period, such as Delarivier Manley in her influential political satire, The New Atalantis (1709), and also by Charles Gildon in the first fully-fledged it-narrative in English, The Golden Spy; or, A Political Journal of the British Nights Entertainments (1709), to name just a few.

Churchill is the principal antagonist in Eugene Scribe's 1840 play The Glass of Water.

Churchill is portrayed by actress Rachel Weisz in the 2018 film The Favourite, which centres on the competition between the Duchess and Lady Masham (Emma Stone) for the affections of Queen Anne (Olivia Colman). Weisz won the BAFTA Award for Best Actress in a Supporting Role and was nominated for the Academy Award for Best Supporting Actress for her portrayal.

Churchill was played by Romola Garai in the Royal Shakespeare Company West End production of Helen Edmundson's Queen Anne at the Theatre Royal Haymarket in 2017.

In the 1983 comedy Yellowbeard she was played by Susannah York, and shown as dominating a fat, senile Queen Anne (Peter Bull).

Churchill was played by Susan Hampshire in the 1969 BBC television serial The First Churchills. Hampshire received an Emmy Award for her portrayal of Churchill.

Court offices
First	Mistress of the Robes to Queen Anne; Groom of the Stole to Queen Anne; 1702–1711	Succeeded by The Duchess of Somerset
First	Keeper of the Privy Purse to Queen Anne; 1702–1711	Succeeded by The Lady Masham
Honorary titles
Preceded by Baptist May	Ranger of Windsor Great Park; 1702–1744	Succeeded by Hon. John Spencer
