= Anne Spencer, Countess of Sunderland (1683–1716) =

English court official and noblewoman

The Right Honourable The Countess of Sunderland
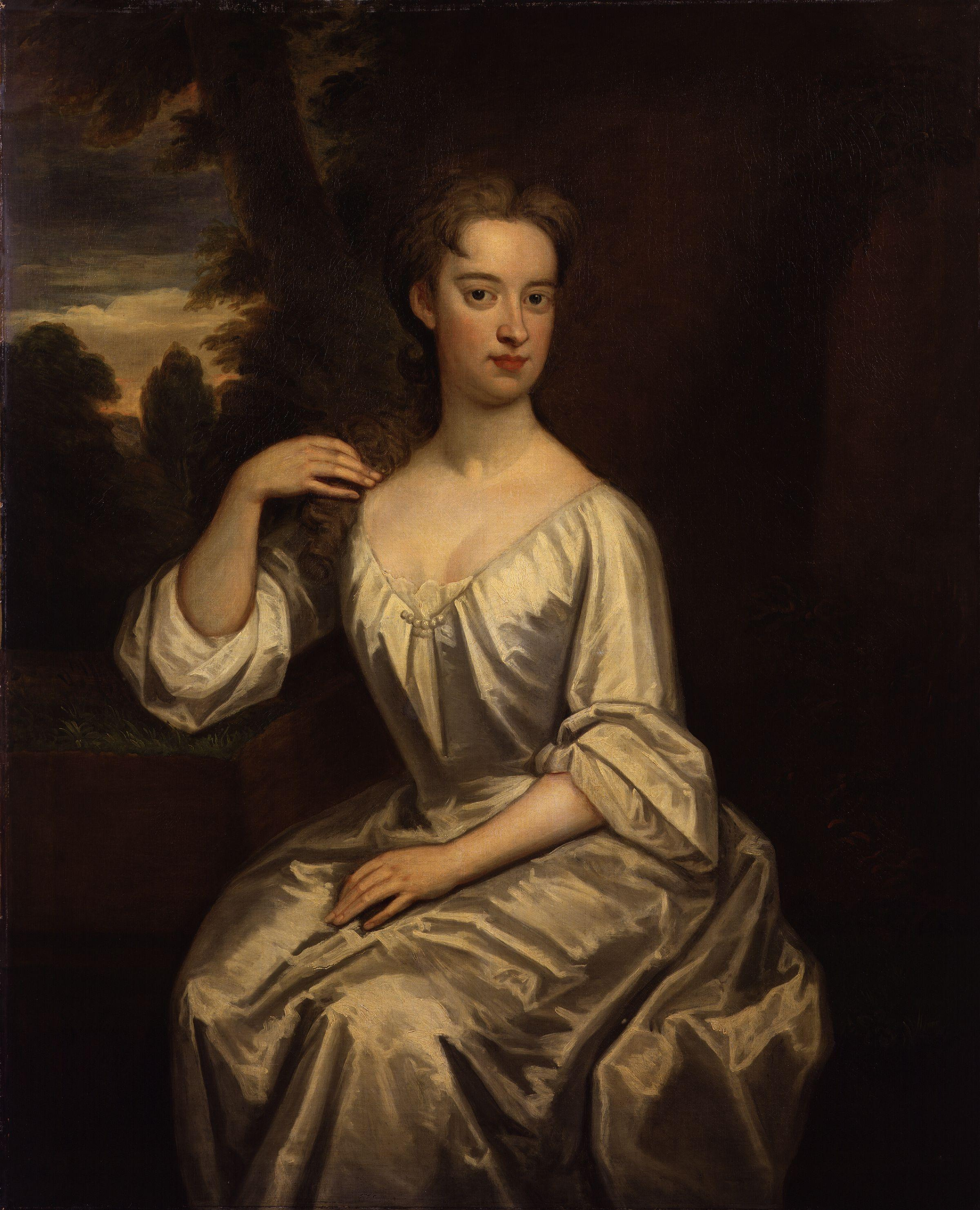
- The Countess of Sunderland, by Sir Godfrey Kneller, c. 1710
- Born: Lady Anne Churchill; 27 February 1683
- Died: 15 April 1716 (aged 33)
- Buried: Brington, Northamptonshire
- Noble family: Churchill (by birth); Spencer (by marriage)
- Spouse: Charles Spencer, 3rd Earl of Sunderland (m. 1700)
- Issue: Robert Spencer, 4th Earl of Sunderland; Anne Spencer, Viscountess Bateman; Charles Spencer, 3rd Duke of Marlborough; Hon. John Spencer; Diana Spencer, Duchess of Bedford
- Father: John Churchill, 1st Duke of Marlborough
- Mother: Sarah Jenyns
- Occupation: Lady of the Bedchamber

Anne Churchill, later Anne Spencer, Countess of Sunderland (27 February 1683 – 15 April 1716), (Note: Some sources state that Anne was born in 1684 or 1685.) was an English court official and noble. She once held the office of Lady of the Bedchamber to Queen Anne.

Anne Churchill was a daughter of a duke, a younger sister of a duchess, and the mother of another duke, but her highest title was only a countess by marriage.

== Early life ==
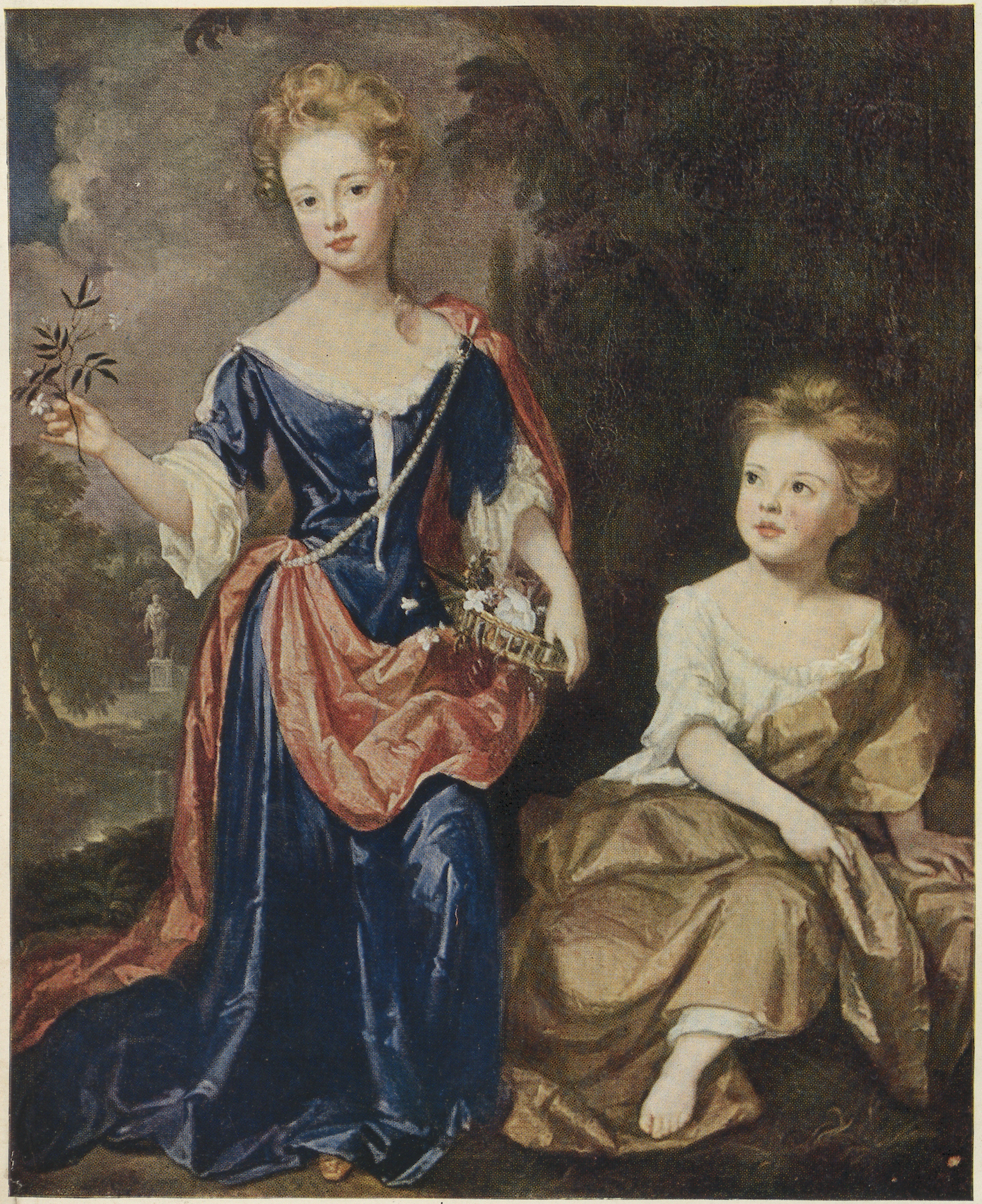
Anne Churchill with her elder sister Henrietta Churchill, 2nd Duchess of Marlborough

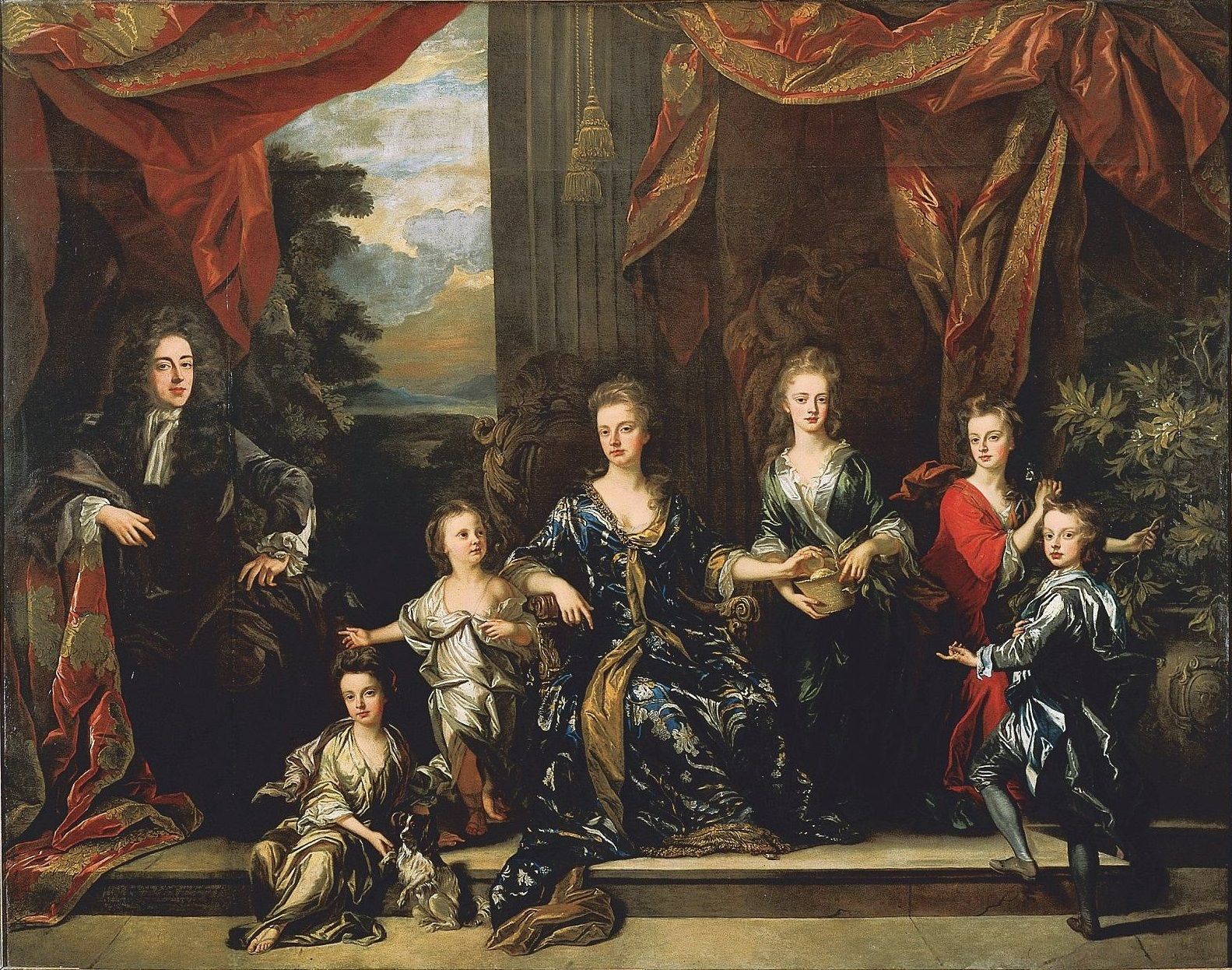
The family of John Churchill, 1st Duke of Marlborough. From left to right: The Duke of Marlborough, Elizabeth, Mary, The Duchess of Marlborough, Henrietta, Anne and John.

Anne Churchill was the third daughter of John Churchill, 1st Duke of Marlborough, and Sarah Jenyns. She was named after Princess Anne of Denmark (the future Anne, Queen of Great Britain) who was Anne Churchill's godmother. Anne Churchill was also goddaughter of Anne Digby, the Countess of Sunderland (her future mother-in-law). As her father was created a sovereign prince by the Holy Roman Emperor Joseph I, Anne was also a princess of the Holy Roman Empire and later of the Principality of Mindelheim. Lady Sunderland also looked after Anne and her sister Henrietta when they were little children, when Sarah had to perform her duty at court. Lady Sunderland was also the one who witnessed when Anne had her first tooth.

== Marriage ==
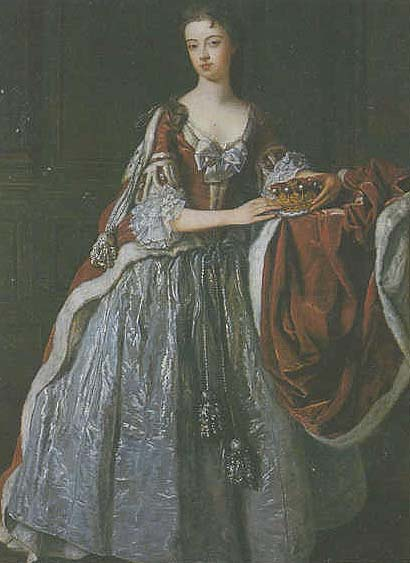
Portrait of Anne Churchill

After the eldest sister Henrietta Churchill got married in 1698, Sarah began arranging the marriage between her beloved daughter Anne and the young widower Charles Spencer. Charles was the son of the Countess of Sunderland, a friend of Sarah. With this idea, Sarah could be credited with the foundation of the Spencer-Churchill family. Although the Countess of Sunderland supported the marriage, Sarah was hesitant over the match. Politically, the marriage of Anne Churchill and Charles Spencer was a good match, for Charles was a rising Whig star in Parliament. However, on a personal level Sarah found him unattractive, for his face had a giant smallpox scar. Her husband also disagreed with the match. As a result, the courtship between Charles and Anne dragged on for almost two years. On the other hand, the Duchess of Marlborough thought Charles Spencer did not love her daughter enough; but the Countess of Sunderland told Sarah that the beauty and sweetness of Anne had won her son's heart, and the Earl also gave Sarah a rash promise that Charles should be ruled by Marlborough in all things political. Finally, Sarah gave way and persuaded her husband to give permission to the marriage.

On 2 January 1700, Anne Churchill married Charles Spencer. The Princess Anne gave her goddaughter a wedding gift of 5,000 pounds, as she had to Anne's elder sister Henrietta. Despite Sarah's misgivings, the marriage of her daughter to Charles was a happy one: Anne was a wonderful wife, and Charles loved her dearly.

== Children ==
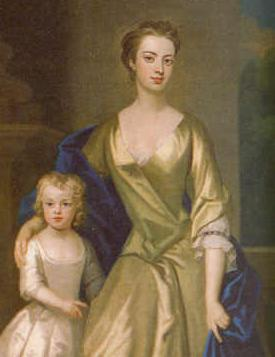
Anne Churchill and her daughter Diana Spencer, Duchess of Bedford

Anne and her husband had six children, two girls and four boys:

- Robert Spencer (2 December 1700 – 12 September 1701).
- Robert Spencer, 4th Earl of Sunderland (24 October 1701 – 27 November 1729).
- Lady Anne Spencer (1702 – 19 February 1769). Married William Bateman, 1st Viscount Bateman. Anne Spencer was a favourite of Caroline of Ansbach, Queen of Great Britain. She was hated by her maternal grandmother.
- Charles Spencer, 3rd Duke of Marlborough (22 November 1706 – 20 October 1758). He inherited the title Duke of Marlborough from his maternal aunt, Henrietta Churchill, 2nd Duchess of Marlborough as his maternal grandfather's eldest male heir, through the claim of his mother. Through Charles, Anne Churchill is an ancestress of Winston Churchill.
- Hon. John Spencer (13 May 1708 – 19 June 1746). Father of John Spencer, 1st Earl Spencer. Compared to his elder brother Charles, John was very beloved by Sarah and was inherited his grandmother's fortune. Thanks to a special remainder, when his brother became Duke of Marlborough John was inherited the estates of Spencer family. Through John, Anne Churchill is an ancestress of Diana, Princess of Wales, and thus of the current heir apparent to the British throne, William, Prince of Wales.
- Lady Diana Spencer (1710 – 27 September 1735). Married John Russell, 4th Duke of Bedford.

== Countess of Sunderland ==
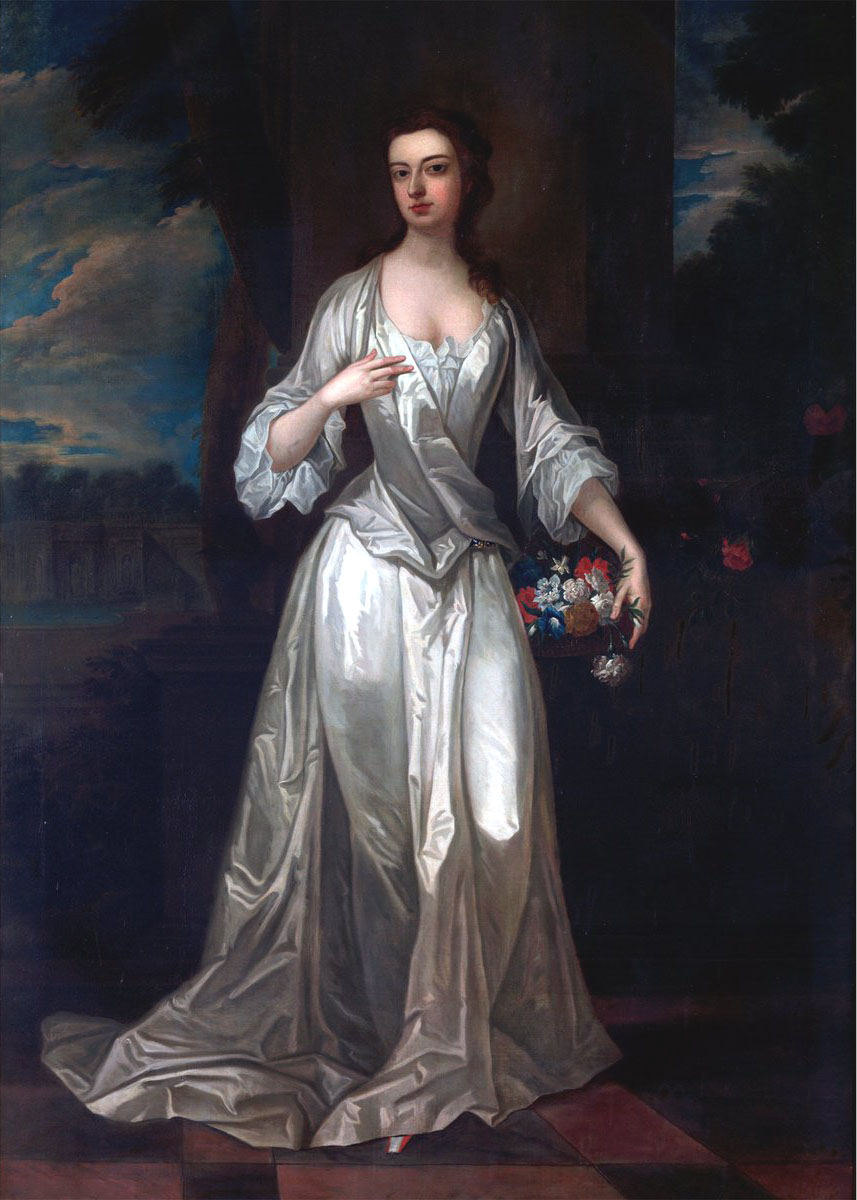
Anne Churchill, Countess of Sunderland

On 28 September 1702, Anne's father-in-law, Robert Spencer, 2nd Earl of Sunderland, died; Charles and Anne therefore became Earl and Countess of Sunderland. After her older sister Henrietta Godolphin, 2nd Duchess of Marlborough, died, the title Duke of Marlborough was inherited by Anne's son, Charles Spencer, 5th Earl of Sunderland.

== Death ==
She died at the age of 33 on 15 April 1716, and was buried on 24 April in Brington, Northamptonshire.

== Bibliography ==
- Campbell, Kathleen Winifred (1933). Sarah, Duchess of Marlborough. London, T. Butterworth.
- Cokayne, George Edward (1887). Complete Peerage of England, Scotland, Ireland, Great Britain and the United Kingdom. Vol. 5. Harvard University. London, G. Bell & sons.
- Doyle, James Edmund (1886). The Official Baronage of England: Showing the Succession, Dignities, and Offices of Every Peer from 1066 to 1885, with Sixteen Hundred Illustrations. Vol. 2. Longmans, Green. p. 480.
- Edwards, Edward (1864). Libraries and Founders of Libraries. Trübner.
- Field, Ophelia (2003). The Favourite: Sarah, Duchess of Marlborough. London: Sceptre. ISBN 978-0-340-76808-2.
- Fleming, Kate (1975). The Churchills. New York: Viking. ISBN 978-0-670-22222-3.
- Green, David Brontë (1967). Sarah, Duchess of Marlborough. New York: Scribner.
- Hibbert, Christopher (2001). The Marlboroughs: John and Sarah Churchill, 1650-1744. London: Viking. ISBN 978-0-670-88677-7.
- Kronenberger, Louis (1958). Marlborough's duchess; a study in worldliness. New York: Knopf.
- Massey, Victoria (1999). The first Lady Diana. London: London House. ISBN 978-1-902809-01-4.
- National Portrait Gallery (1898). Historical and Descriptive Catalogue of the Pictures, Busts, &c. in the National Portrait Gallery ... London: H.M. Stationery Office. p. 415.
- Noble, Mark (1806). A Biographical History of England, from the Revolution to the End of George I's Reign: Being a Continuation of the Rev. J. Granger's Work; Consisting of Characters Disposed in Different Classes; and Adapted to a Methodical Catalogue of Engraved British Heads; Interspersed with a Variety of Anecdotes, and Memoirs of a Great Number of Persons. Vol. 2. W. Richardson.
- Rowse, A. L. (Alfred Leslie) (1958). The Churchills: from the Death of Marlborough to the Present. New York: Harper.
- Wolseley, Garnet Wolseley (1894). The Life of John Churchill, Duke of Marlborough, to the Accession of Quenn Anne. London: R. Bentley and son.
