= Diana Russell, Duchess of Bedford =

English noblewoman (1710–1735)

Her Grace The Duchess of Bedford
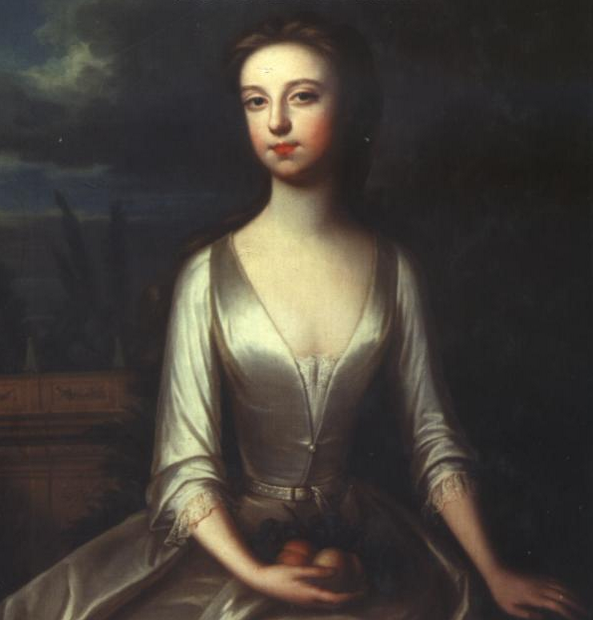
- Portrait of Lady Diana painted by Charles Jervas while she lived in Blenheim Palace
- Born: Lady Diana Spencer; 31 July 1710; London, England
- Died: 27 September 1735 (aged 25); Bedford House (Strand) (formerly called Southampton House), Bloomsbury Square, Bedford Estate, London, England
- Cause of death: Tuberculosis
- Noble family: Spencer (by birth); Russell (by marriage)
- Spouse: John Russell, 4th Duke of Bedford (m. 1731)
- Issue: John Russell, Marquess of Tavistock
- Father: Charles Spencer, 3rd Earl of Sunderland
- Mother: Lady Anne Churchill

Diana Russell, Duchess of Bedford (née Lady Diana Spencer; 31 July 1710 – 27 September 1735), was a member of the Spencer family, chiefly remembered because of an unsuccessful attempt to arrange a marriage for her with Frederick, Prince of Wales.

Orphaned by the age of 12, Lady Diana, known by her family as "dear little Di", joined the household of her rich and ambitious maternal grandmother, Sarah Churchill, Duchess of Marlborough. She was her grandmother's favourite grandchild and closest confidante. The highly influential Duchess of Marlborough tried to arrange a secret marriage between Lady Diana and Prince Frederick, King George II's eldest son and heir apparent to the throne. When the scheme was frustrated by Prime Minister Robert Walpole, Lady Diana was married off to Lord John Russell, later 4th Duke of Bedford. The couple's only child was a son named John, whose preterm birth was induced by a carriage accident and who lived for a day. Following a further miscarriage, the Duchess of Bedford died of tuberculosis at the age of 25.

Diana's brother John's descendant Lady Diana Spencer, who married Charles, Prince of Wales, in 1981, was named after her.

== Early life ==
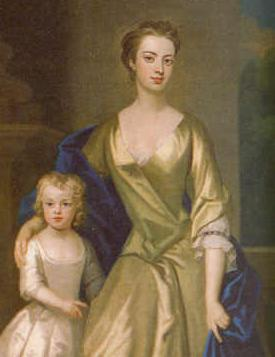
Lady Sunderland and Lady Diana, by Sir Godfrey Kneller

Lady Diana Spencer was born into the rising Spencer family in London on 31 July 1710. She was the second daughter and youngest of five children of the English statesman Charles Spencer, 3rd Earl of Sunderland, and his second wife, Anne Spencer, Countess of Sunderland (née Lady Anne Churchill). The Countess of Sunderland was the second-born but favourite and politically most active daughter of the English soldier and statesman John Churchill, 1st Duke of Marlborough. Lady Sunderland's mother, Sarah Churchill, Duchess of Marlborough, was one of the most influential women of the time due to her close friendship with Queen Anne, who died in 1714.

Following her mother's death on 29 April 1716, Lady Diana's father married his third wife, Judith Tichborne, on 17 December 1716. The marriage produced three children who died in infancy, and ended with Lord Sunderland's death on 19 April 1722. The Duke of Marlborough died on 16 June the same year. His widow, now Dowager Duchess of Marlborough, had closely involved herself with the upbringing of Lady Diana and her siblings since the death of Lady Sunderland. The death of the children's father left them entirely in the care of the Dowager Duchess.

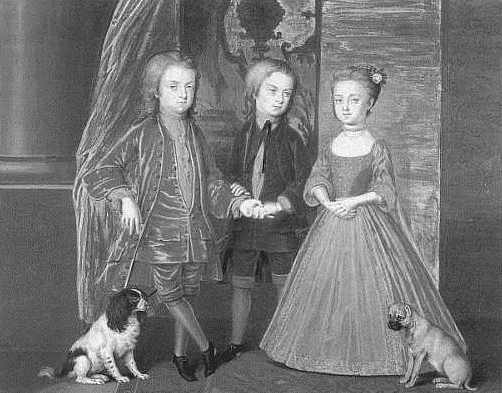
Bernard Lens's 1720 portrait of Diana and her brothers Charles and John

Known to her family as "dear little Di", Lady Diana grew up into a tall, fair-haired, and attractive young woman, and was considered sympathetic and charismatic by her contemporaries. She acted as amanuensis to her grandmother, who found writing her numerous letters difficult due to her gout. In 1723, her grandmother described her as having "more sense than anybody I know of my sex". Growing up as a neighbour of the composer George Frideric Handel, Lady Diana gained a lifelong interest in opera.

== Suitors and royal match scheme ==
In her late adolescence, Lady Diana was at the top of the list of eligible high society brides due to both her looks and her closeness to the tremendously rich Dowager Duchess of Marlborough. The Duke of Somerset attempted to procure her marriage to his grandson, Master Wyndham. The Viscount Weymouth and the Earl of Shaftesbury were also Lady Diana's suitors.

Already well-liked by the prospective bride's domineering grandmother, the middle-aged Earl of Chesterfield proposed marriage by writing from The Hague to the Dowager Duchess on 14 August 1731: "The person, the merit and the family of Lady Diana Spencer are objects so valuable that they must necessarily have ... caused many such applications of this nature to Your Grace." The Dowager Duchess, however, turned him down too. Waiting for a wealthy suitor with both a title and appropriate political leanings almost proved to be a great mistake when Lady Diana developed tuberculous cervical lymphadenitis, requiring the Dowager Duchess to pay a prominent surgeon to hide the traces of the disfiguring disease.

Lady Diana spent her early years in close contact with the children of King George II, despite the initially aloof relationship between her grandmother and his family. By the 1730s, the connection between the Dowager Duchess of Marlborough and the King's family became stronger than ever. Rumours began circulating that the Dowager Duchess was plotting to arrange a marriage between her favourite granddaughter and the King's estranged eldest son and heir apparent, Frederick, Prince of Wales. The ceremony was supposed to take place in secret in the lodge of the Windsor Great Park, and the date was agreed on. The Dowager Duchess offered the greatly indebted Prince of Wales £100,000 in return for agreeing to the match. Prime Minister Robert Walpole, however, preferred a European match. He learned of the scheme through his "infallible spy system" and prevented the union, which led to a further deterioration of his relationship with the Dowager Duchess, already his great rival. The story was only recorded decades later, by Walpole's son Horace.

== Marriage ==
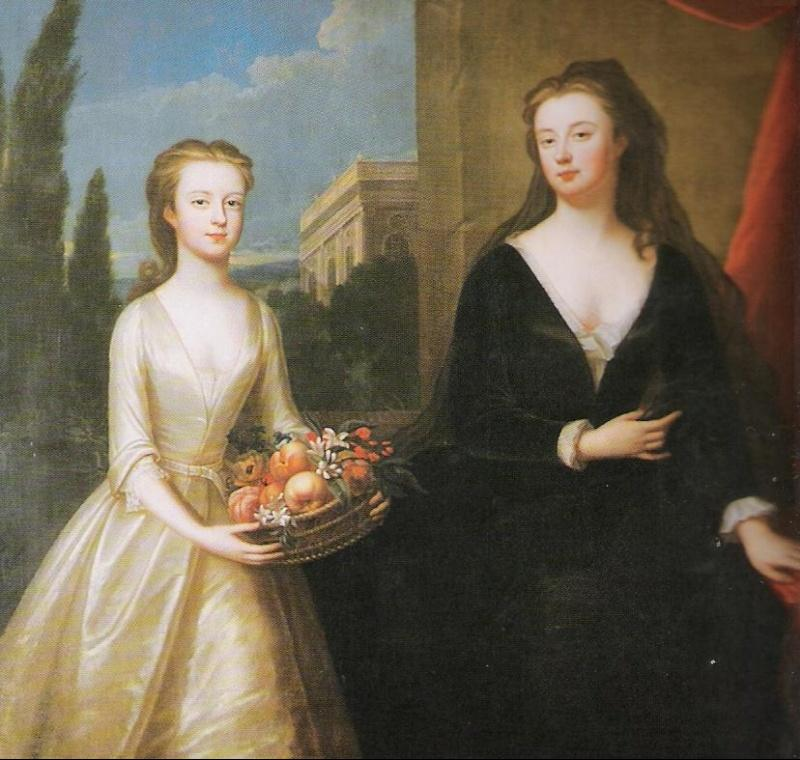
The Dowager Duchess of Marlborough and Lady Diana Spencer, by Maria Verelst

After the planned royal marriage came to nothing, the Dowager Duchess finally settled on the 21-year-old Lord John Russell, younger brother and heir presumptive of the Duke of Bedford. The marriage between Lady Diana and Lord John was celebrated on 11 October 1731. She brought a dowry of £30,000, with another £100,000 promised as inheritance on the death of her grandmother. The Dowager Duchess probably hoped and believed that her grandson-in-law would eventually become Duke of Bedford, and he did. The death of her brother-in-law in Spain on 23 October 1732 made Lady Diana Duchess of Bedford and châtelaine of Woburn Abbey.

The news of her brother-in-law's death had not yet reached England when, in early November, the pregnant Duchess was thrown from her carriage. The trauma induced the premature birth of a son named John, possibly in Cheam. His baptism was registered on 6 November, but he died within a day and was buried in Chenies on 11 November. Lord Hervey reported that it was deemed so important to prevent the Duchess from learning about her son's death "that after grand consultation ... it was determined a Child should be brought to replace the Defunct, till she was strong enough to hear the truth and be told it was only a pretender".

The Duke soon became obsessed with fathering an heir, and was deeply upset when, few months after the birth of their child, the Duchess's next pregnancy ended in miscarriage. The Duchess found herself reproached for not looking after herself properly during the pregnancy.

Although they no longer lived together, grandmother and granddaughter still saw each other frequently and exchanged two to three letters weekly when they were separated. The Duchess of Bedford remained the closest confidante of the Dowager Duchess of Marlborough and was kept informed about all family affairs, including financial matters.

== Death ==
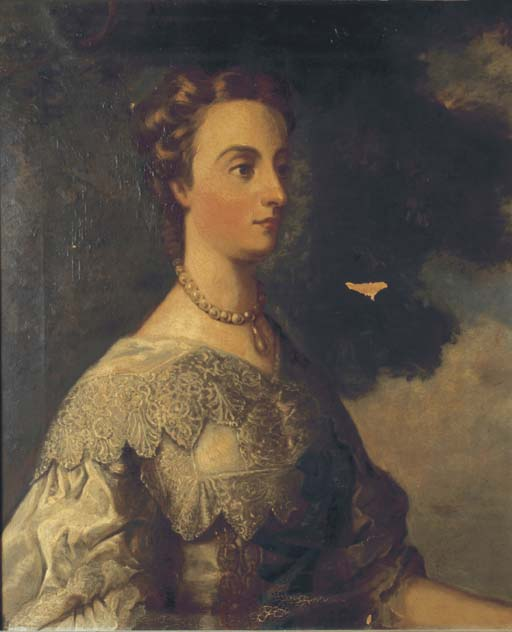
Portrait by Thomas Hudson, still hanging in Woburn Abbey

In the spring of 1735, the Duchess of Bedford started experiencing symptoms of what she believed was her third pregnancy. Whether or not her morning sickness was the result of a pregnancy is uncertain, but it soon became apparent that the Duchess had contracted tuberculosis. The illness progressed rapidly, and the Duchess was drastically losing rather than gaining weight. The Dowager Duchess insisted that her granddaughter be moved to Bedford House in Bloomsbury Square. She died there intestate on 27 September 1735, aged 25 and leaving no surviving issue.

The Duchess's grief-stricken grandmother reread and burned all the Duchess's letters, and accused her widower of being responsible for her death. Despite her "contempt for ostentatious piety" and "her religious doubts", the Dowager Duchess of Marlborough reportedly prostrated herself on the floor of Marlborough House in prayer upon the death of her favourite grandchild. She had become estranged from all her surviving daughters, and the Duchess of Bedford was her only grandchild who never disappointed her. Lord Hervey, however, accused the Dowager Duchess of caring more about the return of her granddaughter's jewels, which she demanded back from the Duke even before the Duchess was buried. The Duchess of Bedford's lead-lined coffin was placed on a gun carriage and taken through the streets. She was buried on 9 October 1735 at Chenies, Buckinghamshire. Her death removed her grandmother's link with the Duke of Bedford, leading to a considerable diminishment in the latter's influence.

== Legacy ==
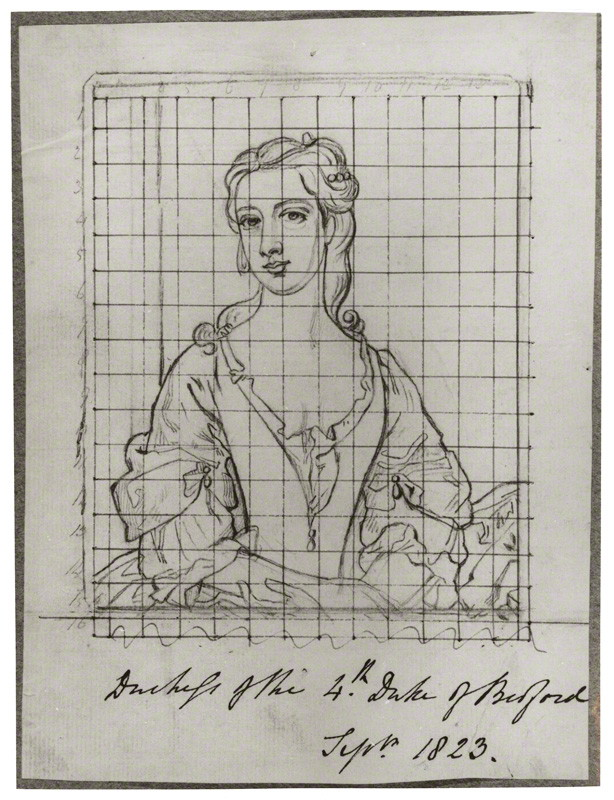
Pencil drawing by Henry Bone, September 1823

Wimbledon House, which the Duchess had stood to inherit according to her grandmother's plan, passed instead to her brother John, the favourite grandson. In 1961, her brother John's descendant, Viscount Althorp, became the father of a daughter whose name was not chosen until a week after the birth. The infant was christened Diana, after the Duchess of Bedford. Unlike her ancestor, the 20th-century Lady Diana Spencer married her Prince of Wales, Charles, in 1981. She died in 1997, aged 36, a year after their divorce. Victoria Massey, biographer of the earlier Lady Diana Spencer, noted the similarities between the lives of the two namesakes: as children, they both lived at Althorp and socialised with royalty; both grew up without a mother from the age of six; both were proposed as a bride for a Prince of Wales; both had an accident during her first pregnancy; and both died unexpectedly at a young age.
