= John Churchill, Marquess of Blandford =

British nobleman (1686–1703)

Marquess of Blandford
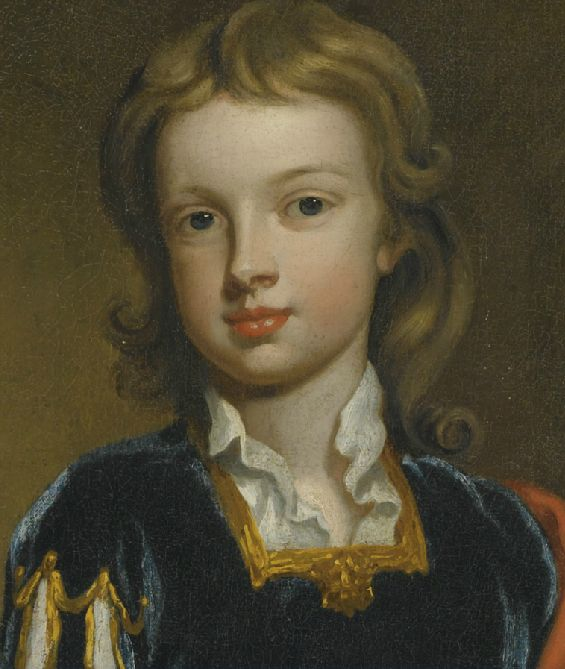
- Detail of a portrait by the studio of Sir Godfrey Kneller, ca. 1698.
- Tenure: 14 December 1702 – 1703
- Born: 13 February 1686
- Died: 20 February 1703 (aged 17); King's College, Cambridge
- Parents: John Churchill, 1st Duke of Marlborough; Sarah Churchill, Duchess of Marlborough

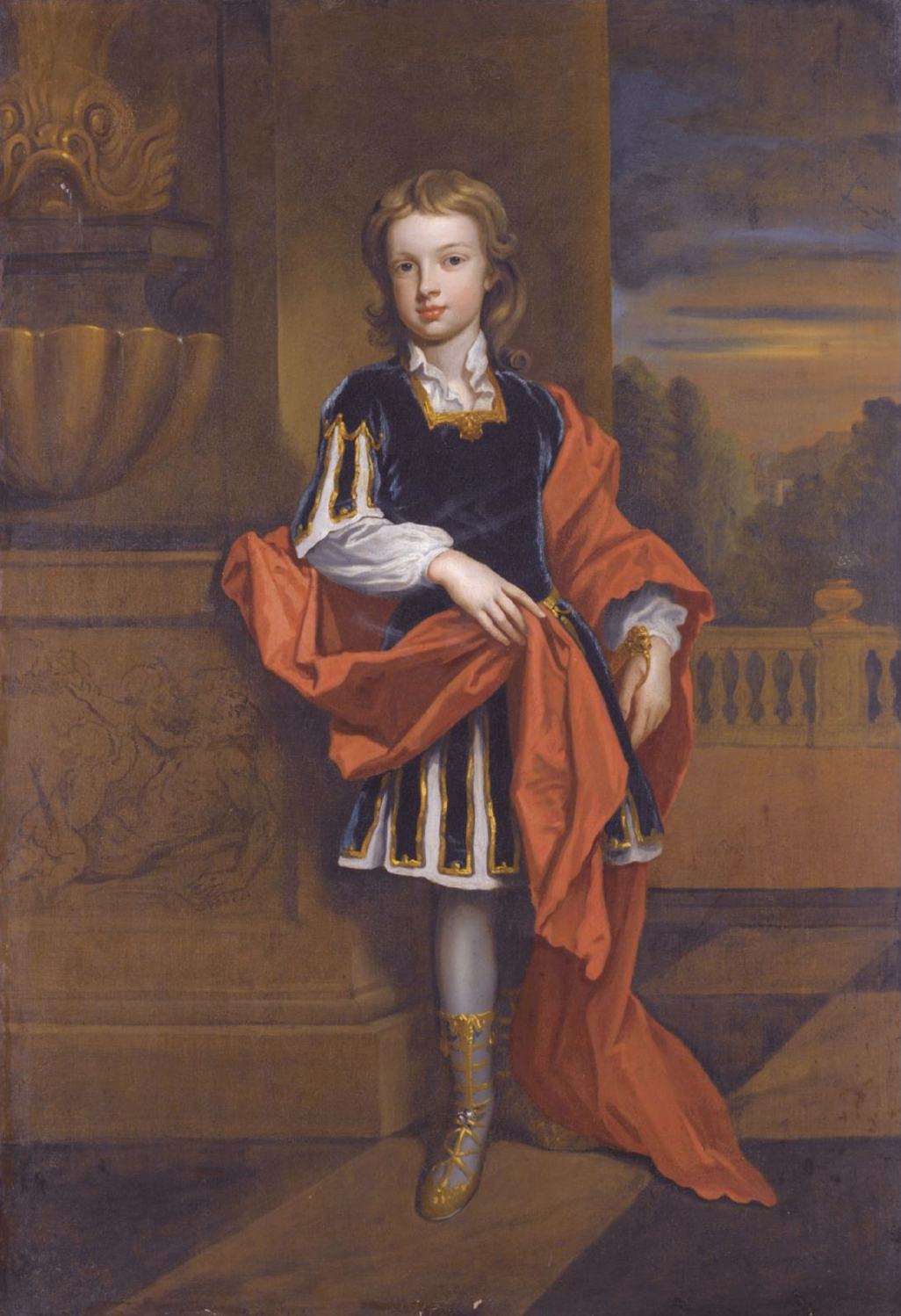
Portrait of John Churchill, Marquess of Blandford

John Churchill, Marquess of Blandford (13 February 1686 – 20 February 1703), sometimes called Charles Churchill, was an English nobleman. He was the heir apparent to the dukedom of Marlborough – as the only surviving son of John Churchill, 1st Duke of Marlborough, an accomplished general, and Sarah Churchill, Duchess of Marlborough, a close friend of Queen Anne. Blandford died childless in 1703, and upon his father's death in 1722, the dukedom passed to his eldest sister, Lady Henrietta Godolphin (née Churchill).

== Life ==
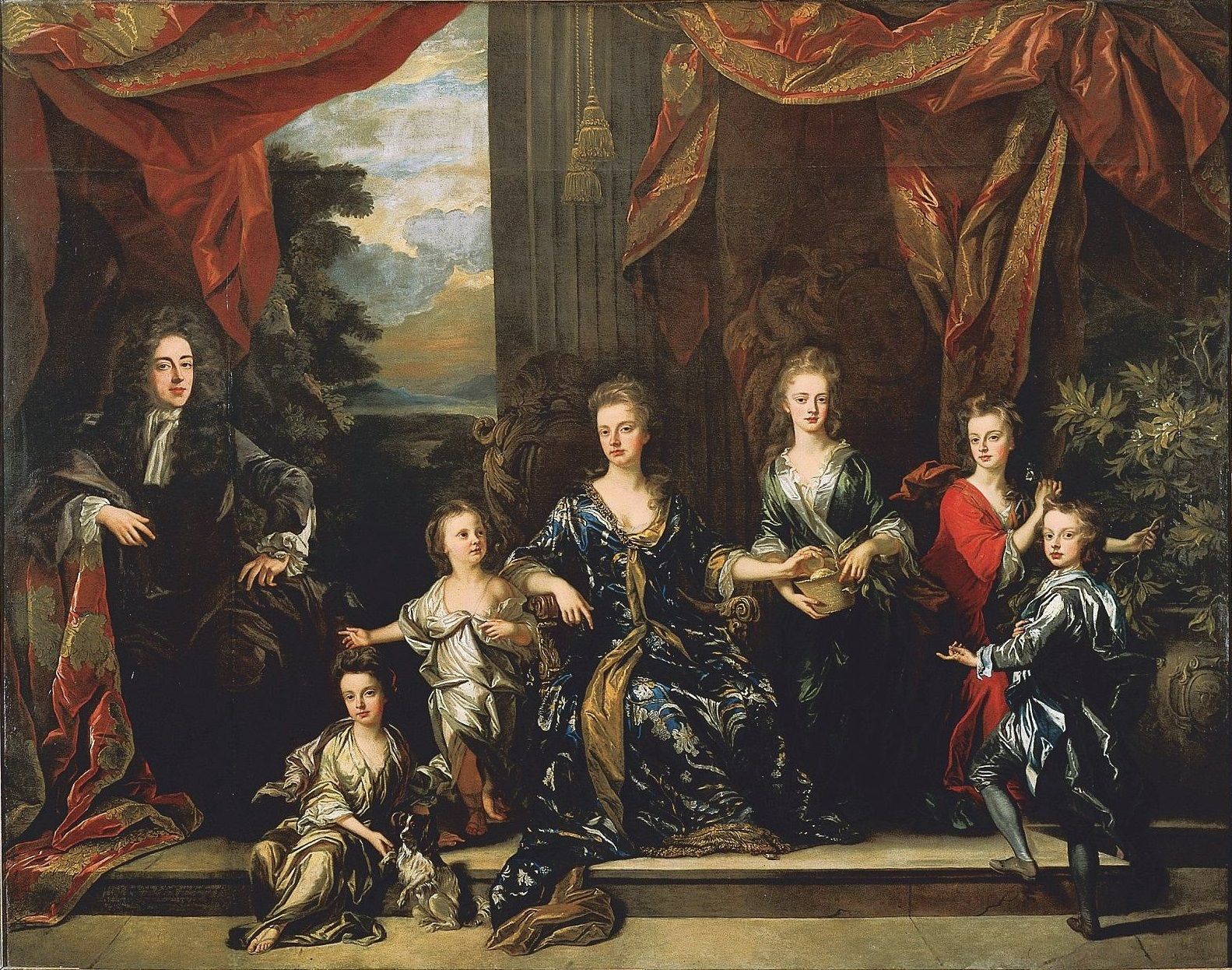
The family of John Churchill, 1st Duke of Marlborough. From left to right: The Duke of Marlborough, Elizabeth, Mary, The Duchess of Marlborough, Henrietta, Anne and John.

John Churchill was born on 13 February 1686, to John Churchill, later 1st Duke of Marlborough, already an accomplished military man under the service of the future James II of England, and Sarah Churchill, the future Duchess of Marlborough, the youngest daughter of politician Sir Richard Jennings. While Churchill was a Protestant, Jennings was born into a Catholic home. Later in February 1686, the younger John was baptized, while Richard Talbot, 1st Earl of Tyrconnell, his uncle by marriage to his aunt Frances Jennings, and Sidney Godolphin, 1st Earl of Godolphin, stood as godfathers. Virtually nothing is known of his childhood, as his parents were not very prominent at the time and not much is recorded.

On 14 December 1702, Queen Anne, a close friend of the younger Churchill's mother, created the elder Churchill Duke of Marlborough in the peerage of England, whence William III and Mary II had previously created him Earl of Marlborough, thus allowing his children, including the younger Churchill, the title of Lord or Lady. The Countess of Marlborough had only given birth to one other son, Charles (1690–1692), and by 1702, the younger Churchill was the couple's only surviving son. After his father's creation, the younger Churchill, as heir apparent to the dukedom of Marlborough, was awarded the courtesy title Marquess of Blandford.

=== Education ===
In 1696, 10-year-old Churchill was sent to Eton College, where he remained and studied until 1700, his fourteenth year. It was Blandford's personal wish to follow a military career as his father did, and join the latter's regiment, but his mother was concerned at the risks and wanted to ensure the dukedom could be passed through the male line. He was sent to King's College, Cambridge in 1700. Blandford was especially close to his godfather the Earl of Godolphin, whom he often visited, travelling from Cambridge to Newmarket. Thomas Bruce, 2nd Earl of Ailesbury, described Blandford as "the finest young man that could be seen."

== Death ==
In early 1703, seventeen-year-old Blandford contracted smallpox, then a deadly disease. The Duchess rushed to her son's bedside, while Queen Anne dispatched her own personal doctors to attend Blandford. By 19 February, word reached London that Blandford's condition was hopeless and the Queen, who had lost seventeen children herself, wrote a heartfelt letter to the Duchess of Marlborough in which she stated that she prayed that "Jesus Christ comfort and support you under this terrible affliction, and it is mercy alone that can do it." On Saturday morning, 20 February, Blandford died at King's College, plunging his father into "the greatest sorrow in the world." The Marlboroughs left Cambridge and settled in their country home in St Albans, in order to mourn the passing of their son and heir. Edward Gregg, Queen Anne's biographer, states that Blandford had been his parents' favourite child, while Sidney Godolphin wrote to the Duchess, saying of Blandford: "I do assure you without flattery or partiality that he was not only the most agreeable but the most free thinking and reasonable creature that one can imagine for his age." After Blandford's death, Marlborough made frequent references to his grief. His tomb can be seen in King's College Chapel in Cambridge.
