= Henrietta Godolphin, 2nd Duchess of Marlborough =

English peer

Her Grace The Duchess of Marlborough
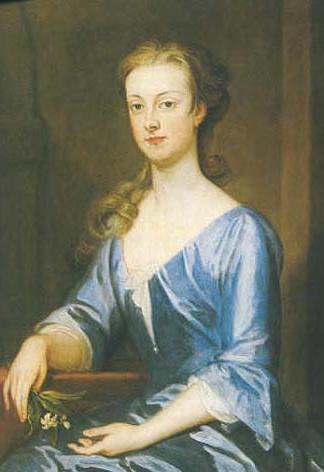
- Portrait of Henrietta Godolphin

Duchess of Marlborough
- Tenure: 16 June 1722 – 24 October 1733
- Predecessor: John Churchill
- Successor: Charles Spencer
- Born: Henrietta Churchill; 19 July 1681
- Died: 24 October 1733 (aged 52); Harrow, Middlesex, Great Britain
- Buried: Westminster Abbey
- Noble family: Churchill
- Spouse: Francis Godolphin, 2nd Earl of Godolphin (m. 1698)
- Issue: William Godolphin, Marquess of Blandford; Lord Henry Godolphin; Lady Margaret Godolphin; Harriet Pelham-Holles, Duchess of Newcastle; Mary Osborne, Duchess of Leeds
- Parents: John Churchill, 1st Duke of Marlborough; Sarah Jennings

Henrietta Godolphin, 2nd Duchess of Marlborough (19 July 1681 – 24 October 1733) was the daughter of John Churchill, 1st Duke of Marlborough, general of the army, and Sarah Jennings, Duchess of Marlborough, close friend and business manager of Queen Anne.

== Biography ==
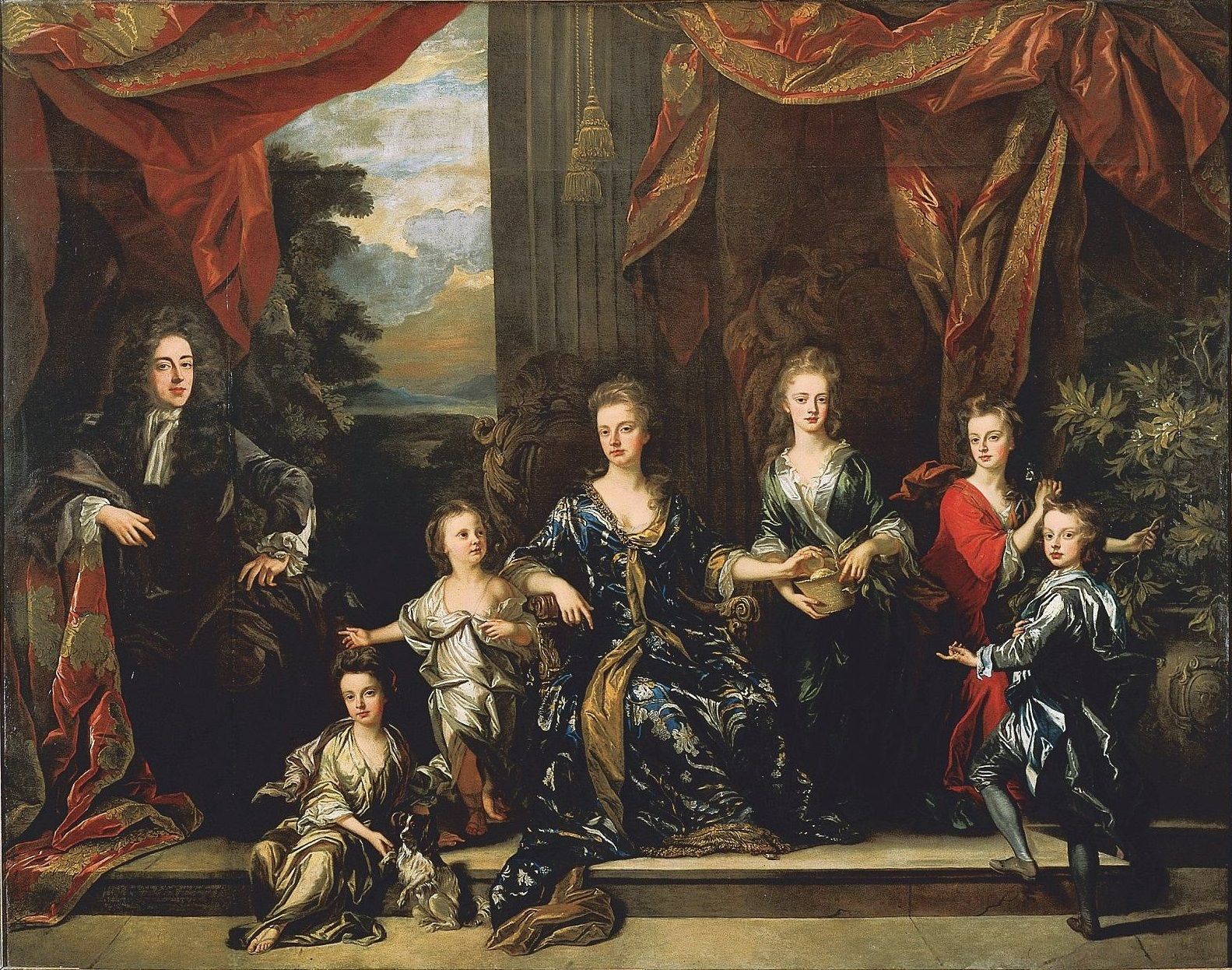
The family of John Churchill, 1st Duke of Marlborough. From left to right: The Duke of Marlborough, Elizabeth, Mary, The Duchess of Marlborough, Henrietta, Anne and John.

She was born Henrietta Churchill and became The Hon. Henrietta Churchill when her father was made a Scottish Lord of Parliament in 1682. She became Lady Henrietta Churchill in 1689, when her father was created Earl of Marlborough. Upon her marriage to The Hon. Francis Godolphin in March 1698, she became Lady Henrietta Godolphin, then Viscountess Rialton in 1706, when her father-in-law was created Earl of Godolphin. When her husband succeeded as 2nd Earl of Godolphin in 1712, she became Countess of Godolphin.

An act of the English parliament in 1706 allowed the 1st Duke's daughters to inherit his English titles. Following his death in 1722, Lady Godolphin became suo jure Duchess of Marlborough.

She bore five children during her marriage to Lord Godolphin:

- William Godolphin, Marquess of Blandford (c. 1700–1731), married Maria Catherina Haeck de Jong, no issue
- Lord Henry Godolphin (b. c. 1700)
- Lady Henrietta Godolphin (1701–1776), married the 1st Duke of Newcastle, no issue
- Lady Margaret Godolphin (b. c. 1703)
- Lady Mary Godolphin (1723–1764), married the 4th Duke of Leeds and had issue. It was rumoured that Lady Mary Godolphin was not, in fact, the daughter of the 2nd Earl of Godolphin, but rather daughter of the playwright William Congreve and Henrietta Godolphin.

The Duchess died in 1733, aged 52, in Harrow, Middlesex, and was buried on 9 November 1733 in Westminster Abbey. Her titles passed to her nephew, the 5th Earl of Sunderland.

== Footnotes ==
Peerage of England
Preceded by John Churchill	Duchess of Marlborough; Suo jure 1722–1733	Succeeded by Charles Spencer
