= Rowlett (disambiguation) =

Rowlett or Rowletts may refer to:

- Tracy Rowlett, American journalist
- Frank Rowlett, cryptographer
- Ralph Rowlett
- Rowlett, Texas
- Rowletts, Kentucky
- Caudill Rowlett Scott - architect firm
- Rowlet - Pokémon
