= Holywell House, Hertfordshire =

Historic building in Hertfordshire, England

Coordinates: 51°44′50″N 0°20′29″W

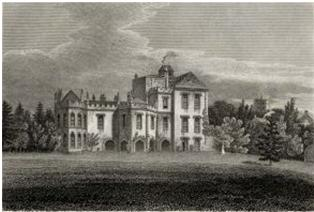
Holywell House, before its demolition in 1837

Holywell House was a house in St Albans, Hertfordshire, England.

The manor house was originally called Hallywell (the later known spelling, Holywell, is probably a corruption of this original spelling). Another possibility as to the origin of the name is the legend of St Alban: Running into St Albans from the south is Holywell Hill, its name taken from the story of Saint Alban's death: legend has it that his severed head rolled down the hill from the execution site and into a well at the bottom (some versions have a well springing from the site at which the head stopped). The manor was in possession of Sir Ralph Rowlett in 1571, and after his death, it passed to his nephew Robert Jenyns (or Jennings). It passed through the Jennings family line, and Sarah Churchill (née Jenyns), Duchess of Marlborough was born here in 1660. After their father Richard's death, the house was jointly owned by Sarah and her sister Frances, until Sarah bought the house outright. She and her husband, John Churchill, 1st Duke of Marlborough often stayed here. The house was demolished in 1837, but a blue plaque marks the spot on Holywell Hill where the house is believed to have stood.

== Namesakes ==
There is also a Holywell House (current home of the Earl and Countess of Clarendon) in Swanmore, Hampshire and a Holywell House (a Grade II* listed building) on Holywell Hill in St Albans. There was also a Holywell House in Swinton, Yorkshire, seat of the Haden family.
