= John Churchill, 1st Duke of Marlborough =

British army officer and statesman (1650–1722)

General His Grace The Duke of Marlborough KG PC
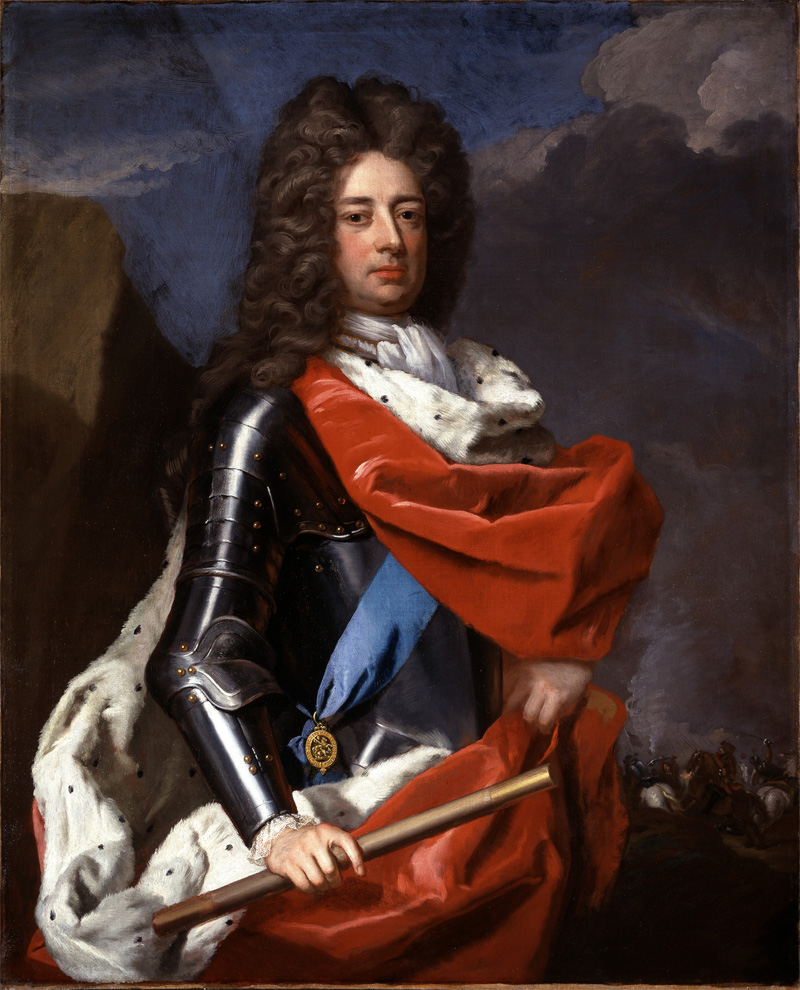
- 1702 portrait
- Born: 26 May 1650; Ashe House, Devonshire
- Died: 16 June 1722 (aged 72) (Note: All dates in the article are in the Gregorian calendar (unless otherwise stated). The Julian calendar as used in England until 1752 differed by 11 days after 1700, and ten days prior to that date. Thus, the battle of Blenheim was fought on 13 August (Gregorian calendar) or 2 August (Julian calendar). In this article (O.S.) is used to annotate Julian dates with the year adjusted to 1 January. See the article Old Style and New Style dates for a more detailed explanation of the dating issues and conventions.); Windsor Lodge, Berkshire
- Spouse: Sarah Jennings (m. 1677 or 1678)
- Military career
- Allegiance: England; Great Britain
- Branch: English Army; British Army
- Service years: 1667–1722
- Rank: General
- Unit: Duke of York and Albany's Maritime Regiment of Foot
- Commands: The King's Own Royal Regiment of Dragoons; 3rd Troop of Horse Guards; Ordnance Regiment; Duke of Marlborough's Regiment of Foot; 1st Regiment of Foot Guards
- Conflicts: Conflicts: Franco-Dutch War; Battle of Solebay; Siege of Maastricht (1673); Monmouth Rebellion; Battle of Sedgemoor; Nine Years' War; 1688 invasion of England; Battle of Walcourt; Williamite War in Ireland; Siege of Cork; War of the Spanish Succession; Siege of Venlo (1702); Capture of Liége (1702); Siege of Huy (1703); Battle of Schellenberg; Battle of Blenheim; Passage of the Lines of Brabant; Battle of Ramillies; Battle of Oudenarde; Siege of Lille (1708); Crossing of the Scheldt; Battle of Malplaquet; Siege of Bouchain (1711)
- Awards: Knight of the Order of the Garter

General John Churchill, 1st Duke of Marlborough, 1st Prince of Mindelheim, 1st Count of Nellenburg, Prince of the Holy Roman Empire (26 May 1650 – 16 June 1722 O.S.) was a British army officer and statesman. From a gentry family, he served as a page at the court of the House of Stuart under James, Duke of York, through the 1670s and early 1680s, earning military and political advancement through his courage and diplomatic skill. He is known for never having lost a battle.

Churchill's role in defeating the Monmouth Rebellion in 1685 helped secure James on the throne, but he was a key player in the military conspiracy that led to James being deposed during the Glorious Revolution. Rewarded by William III with the title Earl of Marlborough, persistent charges of Jacobitism led to his fall from office and temporary imprisonment in the Tower of London. William recognised his abilities by appointing him as his deputy in Southern Netherlands (modern-day Belgium) before the outbreak of the War of the Spanish Succession in 1701, but not until the accession of Queen Anne in 1702 did he secure his fame and fortune.

Marriage to Sarah Jennings and her relationship with Anne ensured Marlborough's rise, first to the captain-generalcy of British forces, then to a dukedom. As de facto leader of Allied forces in the Low Countries, his victories at the battles of Blenheim (1704), Ramillies (1706), Oudenarde (1708), and Malplaquet (1709) ensured his place in history as one of Europe's great generals. His wife's stormy relationship with the Queen, and her subsequent dismissal from court, was central to his own fall. Incurring Anne's disfavour, and caught between Tory and Whig factions, Marlborough was forced from office and went into self-imposed exile. He returned to favour with the accession of George I to the throne in 1714, but a stroke in 1716 ended his career.

Marlborough's leadership of the main Allied army against Louis XIV from 1701 to 1711 helped to consolidate Britain's emergence as a front-rank power, while his ability to maintain unity in the fractious coalition demonstrated his diplomatic skills. He is often remembered by military historians as much for his organisational and logistic skills as his tactical abilities. Marlborough's military exploits have resulted in successive historians describing him as one of the finest military commanders in history.

== Early life (1650–1678) ==
=== Family ===
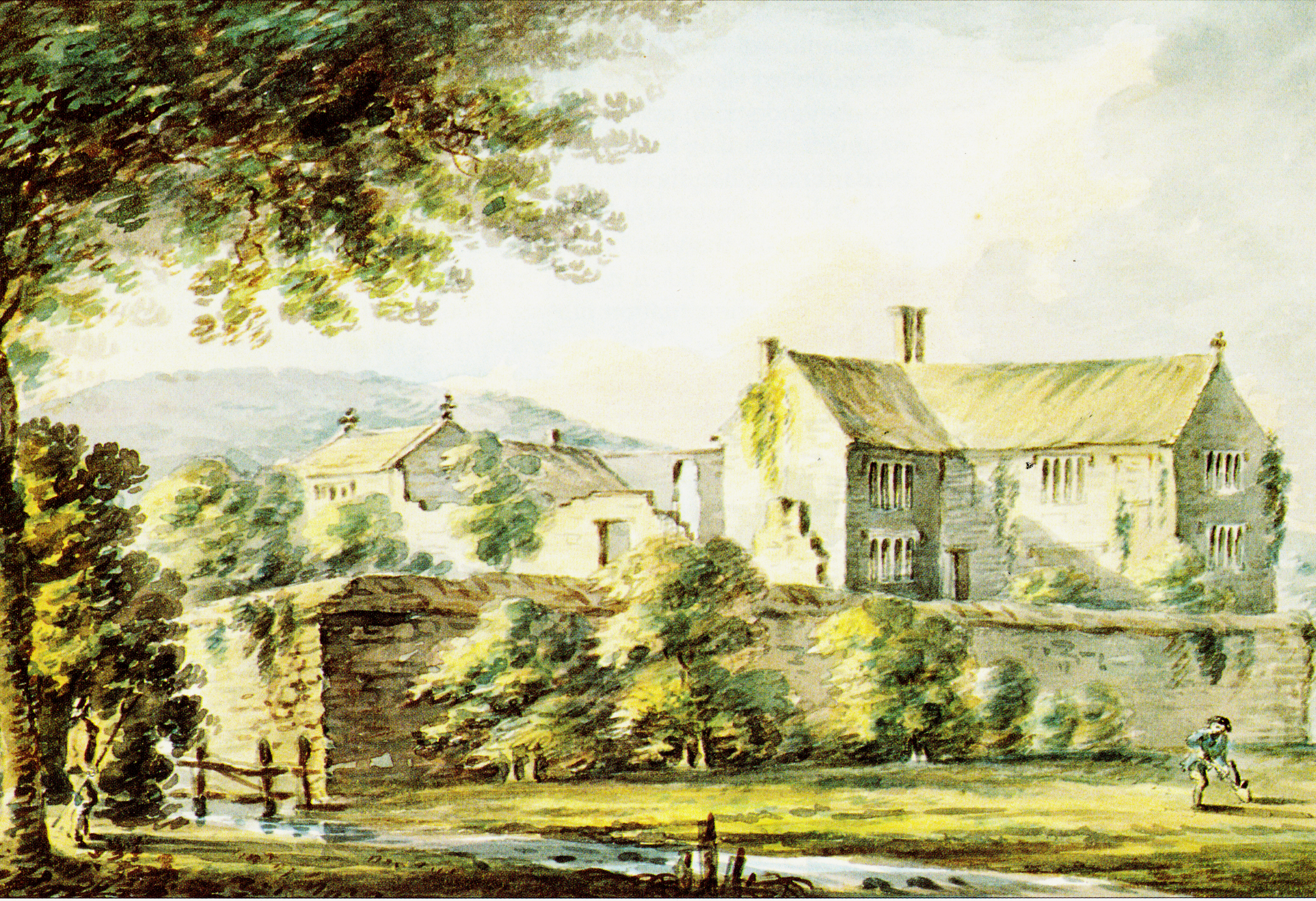
The Drake home of Ash, in Devon, rebuilt by Sir John Drake, 1st Baronet after its near-destruction during the Civil War

Churchill was the second but eldest surviving son of Sir Winston Churchill of Glanvilles Wootton, Dorset, and Elizabeth Drake, whose Drake family came from Ash, Devon. His mother was the maternal granddaughter of John Boteler, 1st Baron Boteler of Brantfield. Winston served with the Royalist army in the Wars of the Three Kingdoms; he was heavily fined for doing so, forcing his family to live at Ash House with his mother-in-law. John Churchill was also a descendant of Edward I through his daughter, Joan of Acre.

After the 1660 Restoration of Charles II, Winston became Member of Parliament for Weymouth and from 1662 served as Commissioner for Irish Land Claims in Dublin. On returning to London in 1663, he was knighted and received a position at Whitehall, with John attending St Paul's School.

The family fortune was made in 1665 when John's sister Arabella Churchill became maid of honour to Anne Hyde and began an affair with her husband, James, Duke of York (later James II). This lasted over a decade; James had four acknowledged children with her, including James FitzJames, 1st Duke of Berwick. Their relationship led to appointments for her brothers: John was appointed page to James, and in September 1667 made an ensign in the Foot Guards.

=== Army entry ===
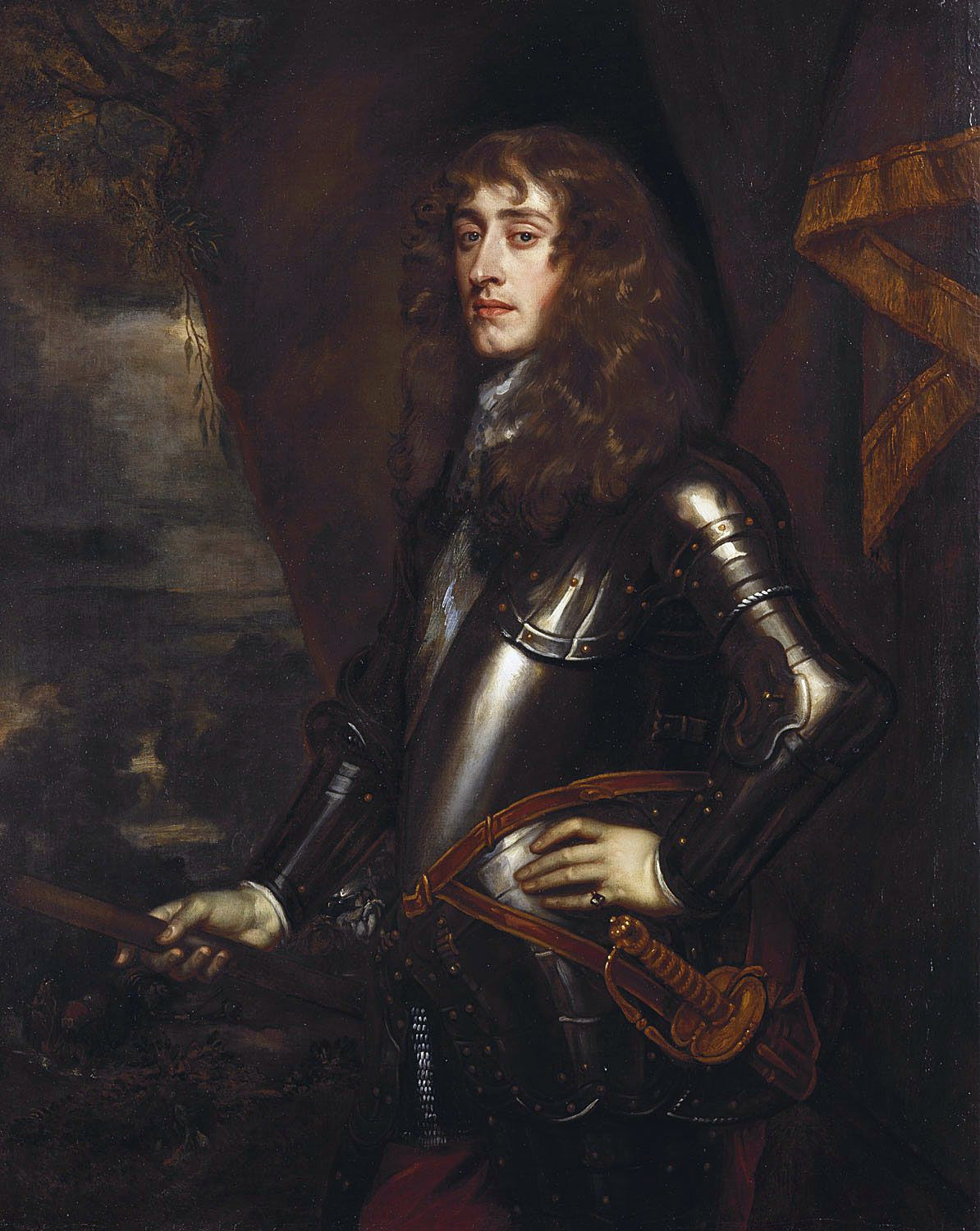
James, Duke of York

Assertions that Churchill served with the Tangier Garrison cannot be confirmed, but he is recorded as being with Sir Thomas Allin in the Mediterranean from March to November 1670. He returned to London, where in February 1671 he engaged in a duel with Sir John Fenwick. He allegedly had an affair with Barbara Villiers, a mistress of Charles II, and may have fathered her daughter Barbara Fitzroy, although he never formally acknowledged her.

Battle of Solebay, Churchill's first major action

In 1670 Treaty of Dover, Charles II agreed to support a French attack on the Dutch Republic and supply a British brigade of 6,000 troops for the French army. Louis XIV paid him £230,000 per year for this. When the Franco-Dutch War began in 1672, Churchill was present at the Battle of Solebay on 28 May, possibly aboard James's flagship, the Prince, which was crippled.

Shortly thereafter, Churchill was commissioned as a captain in the Duke of York and Albany's Maritime Regiment of Foot, which part of the British brigade commanded by the Duke of Monmouth intended to fight against the Dutch in the Low Countries. The alliance with Catholic France was extremely unpopular and many doubted the brigade's reliability against the Dutch. As a result, it served in the Rhineland against the Holy Roman Empire, although Churchill, Monmouth and other volunteers took part in the French siege of Maastricht.

England withdrew from the war with the 1674 Treaty of Westminster, but to keep his subsidies, Charles encouraged members of the Anglo-Scots force to remain in French service; many did so, including Monmouth and Churchill, who became Colonel of one such regiment, serving under Marshal Turenne. He was present at Sinsheim in June 1674, Enzheim in October, and possibly at Sasbach in July 1675, where Turenne was killed.

=== Marriage and Issue ===
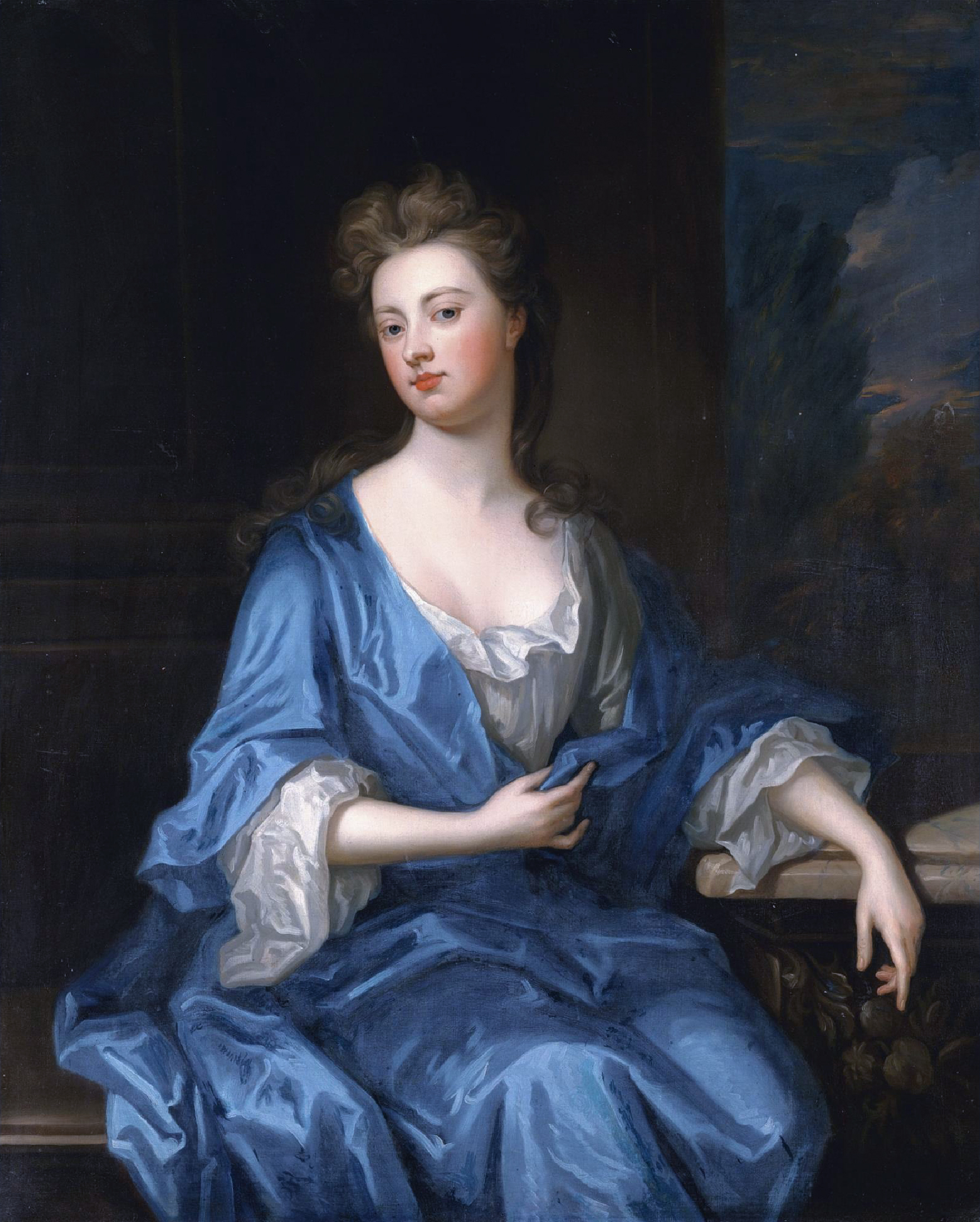
Sarah Churchill, Duchess of Marlborough; attributed to Godfrey Kneller

Sometime around 1675, Churchill met the 15-year-old Sarah Jennings, who came from a similar background of minor Royalist gentry, ruined by the war. The family moved to London after her father died and in 1673, Sarah and her sister Frances joined the household of Mary of Modena, James's second Catholic wife. Despite opposition from his father, who wanted him to marry the wealthy Catherine Sedley, Churchill married Sarah in the winter of 1677–78, helped by Mary.

The couple had five children who survived infancy:

- Henrietta Churchill, 2nd Duchess of Marlborough (1681-1733), who succeeded her father as Duchess of Marlborough, she married Francis Godolphin, 2nd Earl of Godolphin
- Lady Anne Churchill (1683–1716), married Charles Spencer, 3rd Earl of Sunderland, her son would succeed her sister as 3rd Duke of Marlborough
- John Churchill, Marquess of Blandford (1686-1703), died young
- Elizabeth Churchill (1687–1714), married Scroop Egerton, 1st Duke of Bridgewater
- Mary Churchill (1689–1751), married John Montagu, 2nd Duke of Montagu

== Early service (1678–1700) ==
=== Crisis ===
In November 1677, William of Orange married James's eldest daughter, Mary, and in March 1678, the Earl of Danby negotiated an Anglo-Dutch defensive alliance. Churchill was sent to the Hague to make arrangements for an expeditionary force, although English troops did not arrive in significant numbers until after the Peace of Nijmegen ended the war on 10 August.

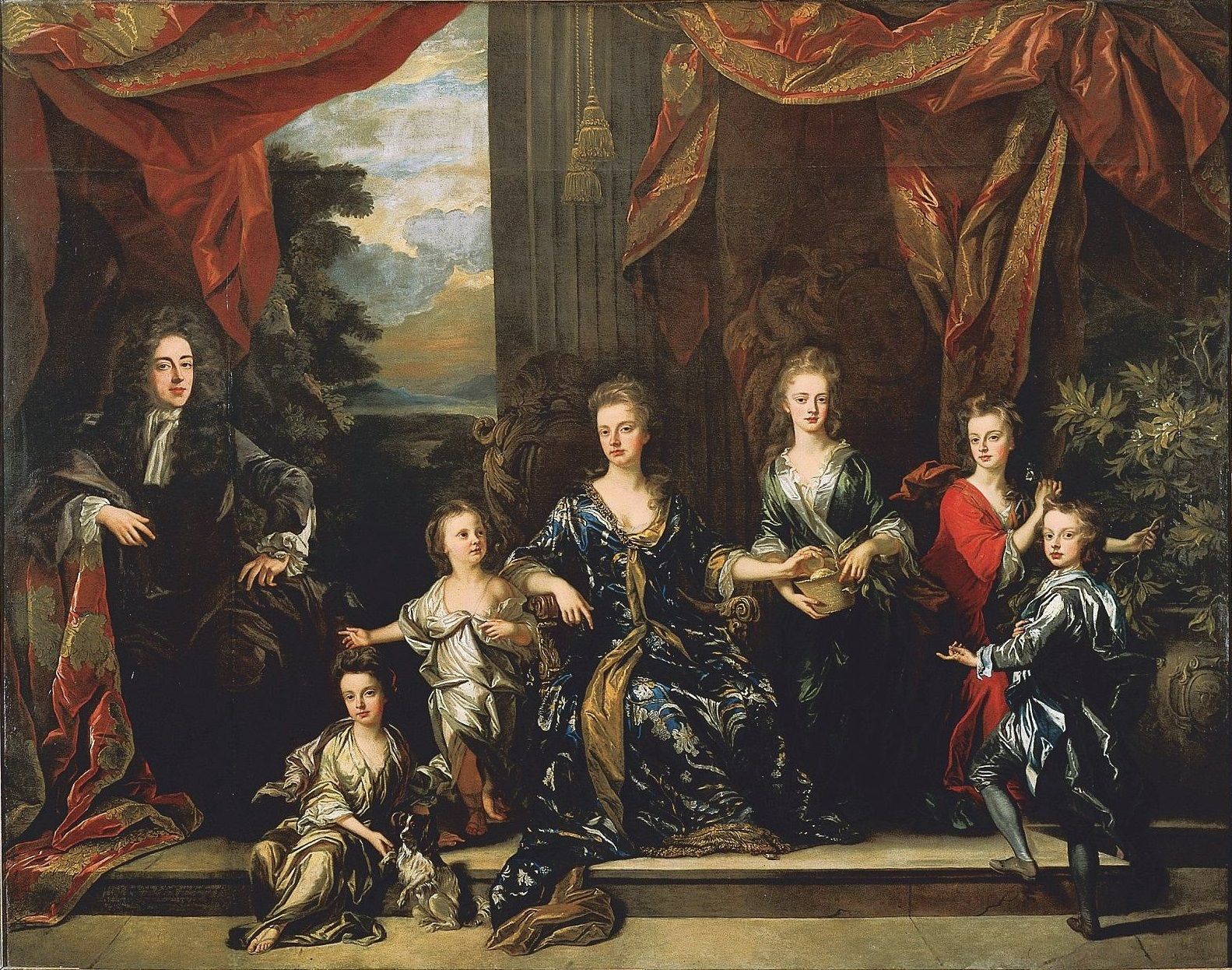
The Marlborough family c. 1694 by John Closterman. On the Duke's left are Elizabeth, Mary, the Duchess, Henrietta, Anne and John.

James publicly confirmed his conversion to Catholicism in 1673; as heir to the throne, this led to a political crisis that dominated English politics from 1679 to 1681. In the 1679 General Election, Churchill was elected MP for Newtown; the majority supported James's exclusion and he spent the next three years in exile, Churchill acting as his liaison with the court.

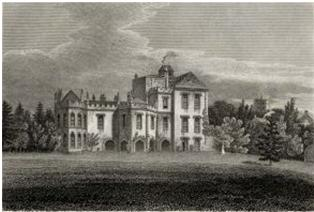
Holywell House, near St Albans, before its demolition in 1837

Charles defeated the Exclusionists and dismissed Parliament in 1681, allowing James to return to London. In 1682, Churchill was made Lord Churchill of Eyemouth in the peerage of Scotland and the following year, colonel of the King's Own Royal Regiment of Dragoons. These rewards allowed him to live in some style and comfort; in addition to a house in London, he purchased Holywell House, near St Albans. He also gained control of the Parliamentary constituency of St Albans; his brother George Churchill held the seat from 1685 to 1708.

His brother Charles Churchill served at the Danish court, where he became friends with Prince George of Denmark, who married James's younger daughter Anne in 1683. His senior aide was Colonel Charles Griffin, brother-in-law to Sarah, appointed Lady of the Bedchamber to Anne. The Churchills and their relatives formed a central part of the so-called 'Cockpit circle' of Anne's friends, named after her apartments in Whitehall. Churchill was reportedly concerned at being too closely associated with James, particularly since Sarah's sister Frances was married to Irish Catholic Richard Talbot, appointed Lord Deputy of Ireland in 1687. This was offset by their connection with the Protestant Anne, while Sarah herself was renowned for being virulently anti-Catholic.

=== Rebellion ===
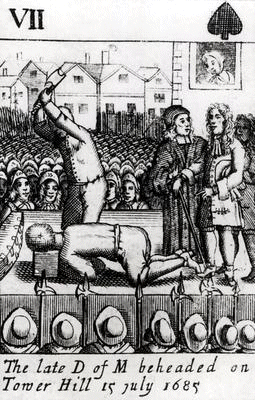
Monmouth's execution on Tower Hill; the executioner reputedly needed five blows, leading to a near riot by the crowd.

Despite his Catholicism, James succeeded Charles as king in February 1685 with widespread support. Many feared his exclusion would lead to a repetition of the 1638–1651 Wars of the Three Kingdoms but tolerance for his personal beliefs did not apply to Catholicism in general. His support collapsed when his policies appeared to threaten the primacy of the Church of England and created the instability his supporters wished to avoid.

This preference for stability led to the rapid defeat in June 1685 of Argyll's Rising in Scotland and the Monmouth Rebellion in western England. In the campaign against Monmouth, Churchill led the infantry, under the command of the Earl of Feversham, at Sedgemoor on 6 July 1685, defeating the rebels and effectively putting an end to the rebellion. Although subordinate to Feversham, Churchill's administrative capacity, tactical skill, and courage in battle were pivotal in the victory.

In recognition of his contribution, he was promoted Major General and given the colonelcy of the Third Troop of Life Guards. In May, he had been made Baron Churchill of Sandridge, giving him a seat in the House of Lords, which led to the first open breach with James; Lord Delamere was accused of involvement in the rebellion and tried by 30 members of the House of Lords, including Churchill. As the most junior peer, he went first and his vote for acquittal was viewed as giving a lead to others; Delamere was set free, much to James's annoyance.

As early as 1682, Churchill was recorded as being uneasy at James's obstinacy. The conviction he was always right often resulted in what many viewed as vindictive behaviour, including Monmouth's clumsy execution and the persecution of his followers by Judge Jeffreys. This provides the immediate context for Delamere's acquittal but shortly after the Coronation, Churchill reputedly told French Protestant Henri de Massue that "If the King should attempt to change our religion, I will instantly quit his service."

=== Revolution ===
Churchill emerged from the Sedgemoor campaign with great credit, but he was anxious not to be seen as sympathetic towards the King's growing religious ardour against the Protestant establishment. James II's promotion of Catholics in royal institutions – including the army – engendered first suspicion, and ultimately sedition in his mainly Protestant subjects; even members of his own family expressed alarm at the King's zeal for Roman Catholicism.

When the queen gave birth to a son, James Francis Edward Stuart, it opened up the prospect of successive Catholic monarchs. Some in the King's service, such as the Earl of Salisbury and the Earl of Melfort, converted to Catholicism and were seen as having betrayed their Protestant upbringing to gain favour at court. Churchill remained true to his conscience, telling the King, "I have been bred a Protestant, and intend to live and die in that communion", although he was also motivated by self-interest. Believing that the monarch's policy would either wreck his own career or generate a wider insurrection, he did not intend, like his unfortunate father before him, to be on the losing side.

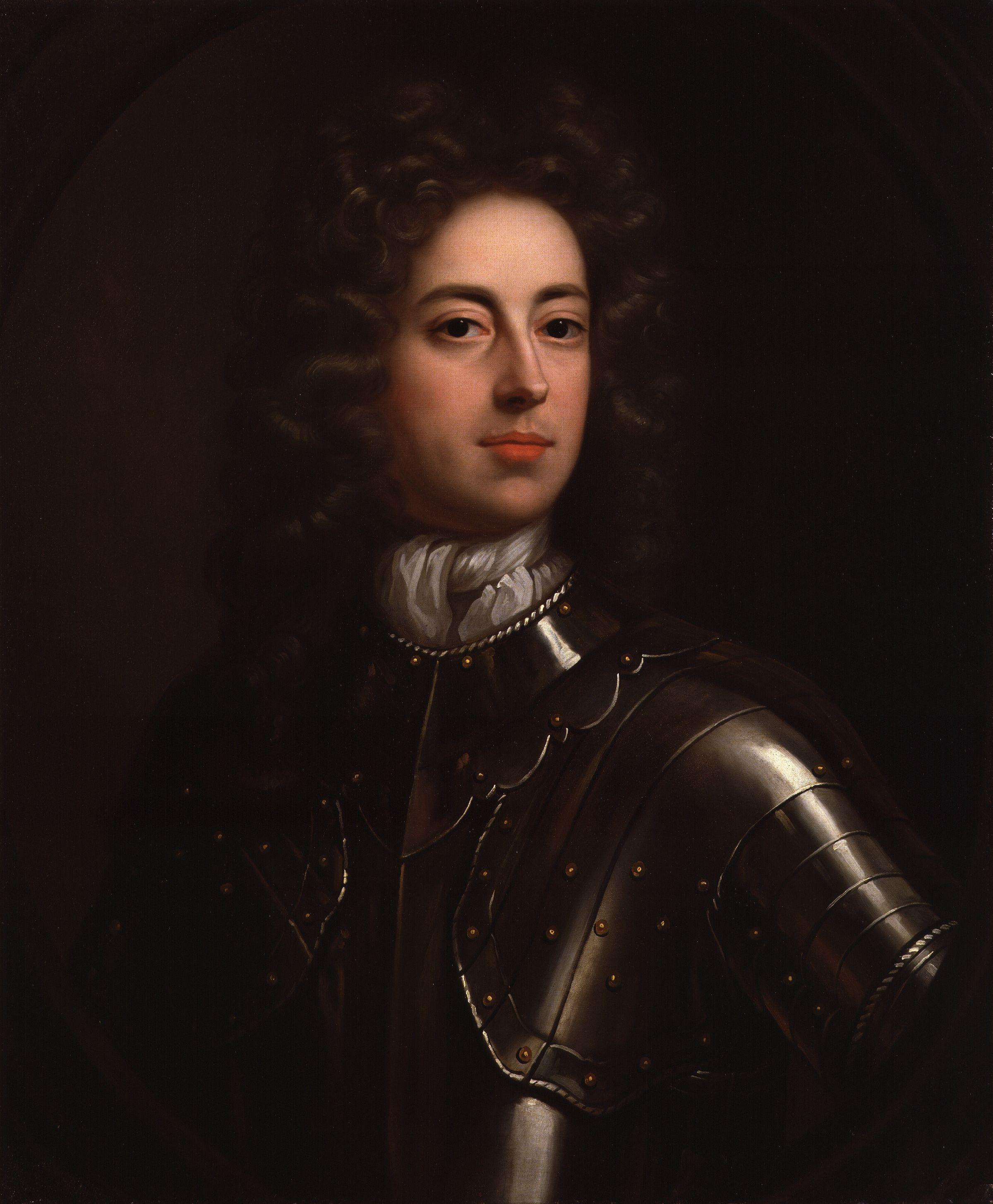
Churchill (c. 1685–1690) by John Closterman

Seven men met to draft the invitation to the Protestant Dutch Stadtholder, William, Prince of Orange, to invade England and assume the throne. The signatories to the letter included Whigs, Tories, and the Bishop of London, Henry Compton, who assured the Prince that, "Nineteen parts of twenty of the people ... are desirous of change".

William needed no further encouragement. Although the invitation was not signed by Churchill (he was not, as yet, of sufficient political rank), he declared his intention through William's principal English contact in The Hague: "If you think there is anything else that I ought to do, you have but to command me".

William landed at Brixham on 5 November 1688 (O.S.); from there, he moved his army to Exeter. James's forces – once again commanded by Lord Feversham – moved to Salisbury, but few of its senior officers were eager to fight – even Princess Anne wrote to William to wish him "good success in this so just an undertaking". Promoted to Lieutenant-General on 7 November (O.S.) Churchill was still at the King's side, but his displaying "the greatest transports of joy imaginable" at the desertion of Lord Cornbury led Feversham to call for his arrest. Churchill himself had openly encouraged defection to the Orangist cause, but James continued to hesitate. Soon it was too late to act. After the meeting of the council of war on the morning of 24 November (O.S.), Churchill, accompanied by some 400 officers and men, slipped from the royal camp and rode towards William in Axminster, leaving behind him a letter of apology and self-justification:

I hope the great advantage I enjoy under Your Majesty, which I own I would never expect in any other change of government, may reasonably convince Your Majesty and the world that I am actuated by a higher principle ...

When the King saw that he could not keep even Churchill – for so long his loyal servant – he despaired. James II, who in the words of the Archbishop of Rheims, had "given up three kingdoms for a Mass", fled to France, taking with him his son and heir.

== William's general ==
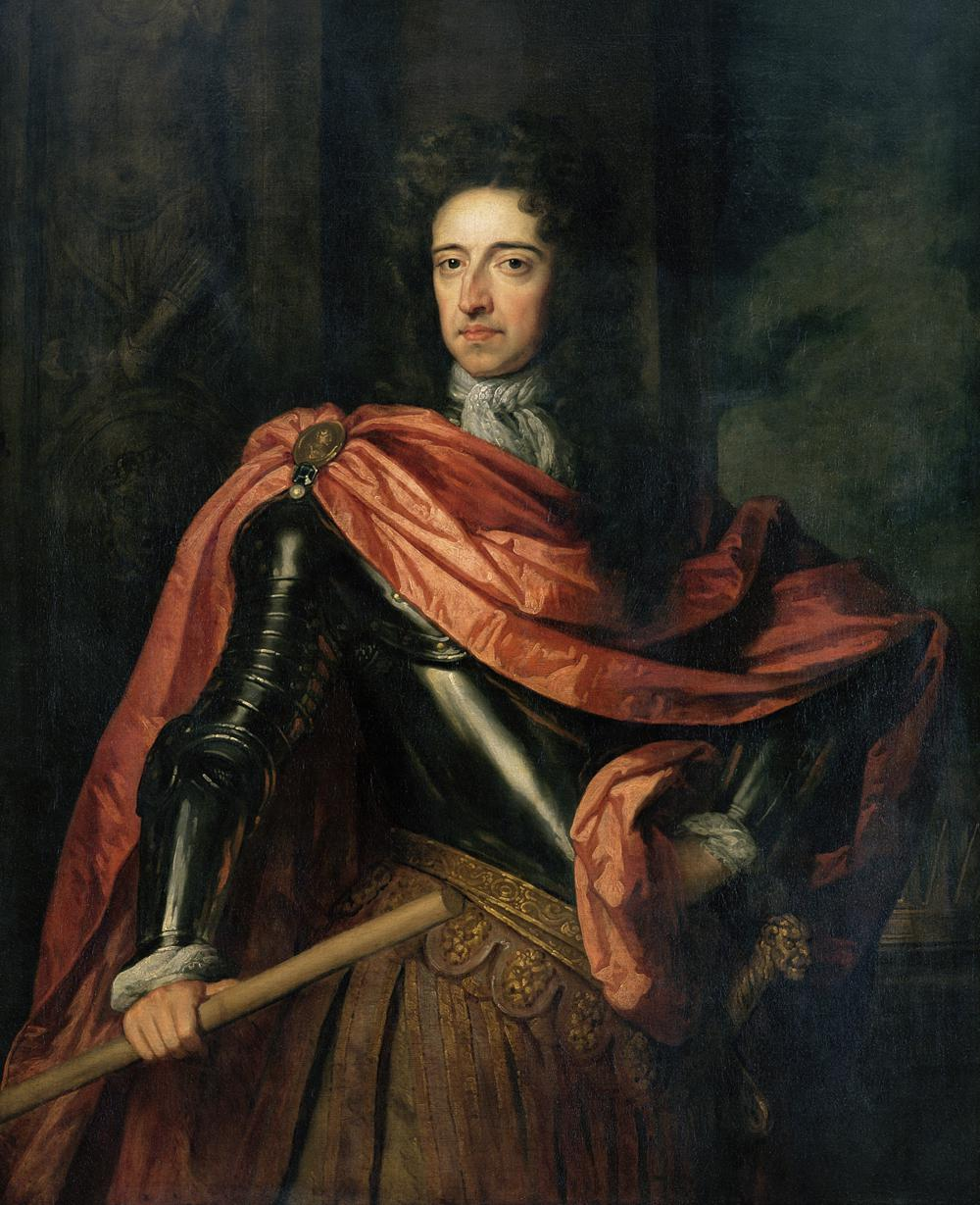
King William III (1650–1702); portrait by Godfrey Kneller

As part of William III and Mary II's coronation honours, Churchill was created Earl of Marlborough on 9 April 1689 (O.S.); he was also sworn as a member of the Privy Council and made a Gentleman of the King's Bedchamber. However his elevation led to accusatory rumours from King James's supporters that Marlborough had disgracefully betrayed his erstwhile king for personal gain; William himself entertained reservations about the man who had deserted James. Marlborough's apologists, including his biographer and most notable descendant, Winston Churchill, have been at pains to attribute patriotic, religious and moral motives to his action; but, in the words of David G. Chandler, it is difficult to absolve Marlborough of ruthlessness, ingratitude, intrigue and treachery against a man to whom he owed virtually everything in his life and career to date.

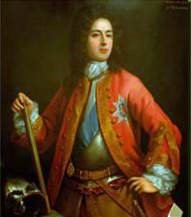
Marlborough in his 30s, attributed to John Riley. The Star of the Order of the Garter was added after 1707.

Marlborough's first official act was to assist in the remodelling of the army: the power of confirming or purging officers and men allowed the Earl to build a new patronage network that would prove beneficial over the next two decades. His task was urgent, for less than six months after James II's departure England joined the war against France as part of a powerful coalition aimed at curtailing the ambitions of Louis XIV. With his experience it was logical that Marlborough took charge of the 8,000 English troops sent to the Low Countries in the spring of 1689; yet throughout the Nine Years' War (1688–97) he saw only three years’ service in the field, and then mostly in subordinate commands. However at the Battle of Walcourt on 25 August 1689 Marlborough won praise from the Allied commander, Prince Waldeck – "despite his youth he displayed greater military capacity than do most generals after a long series of wars ... He is assuredly one of the most gallant men I know."

Since Walcourt, though, Marlborough's popularity at court had waned. William and Mary distrusted both Lord and Lady Marlborough's influence as confidants and supporters of Princess Anne (whose claim to the throne was stronger than William's). Sarah had supported Anne in a series of court disputes with the joint monarchs, infuriating Mary, who included the Earl in her disfavour of his wife. (Note: Chandler 1973, p. 35. Anne wished to have her own Civil list income granted by Parliament rather than a grant from the Privy Purse, which meant reliance on William III. In this and other matters Sarah supported Anne.) Yet for the moment the clash of tempers was overshadowed by more pressing events in Ireland, where James had landed in March 1689 in an attempt to regain his thrones. When William left for Ireland in June 1690 Marlborough became commander of all troops and militia in England and was appointed a member of the Council of Nine to advise Mary on military matters in the King's absence, but she made scant effort to disguise her distaste at his appointment – "I can neither trust or esteem him", she wrote to William.

William III's victory at the Battle of the Boyne on 1 July 1690 (O.S.) forced James II to abandon his army and flee back to France. In August Marlborough himself left for Ireland engaged upon his first independent command – a land/sea operation upon the southern ports of Cork and Kinsale. It was a bold, imaginative project aimed at disrupting Jacobite supply routes, and one which the Earl conceived and executed with outstanding success. Cork fell on 27 September (O.S.), and Kinsale followed in mid-October. Although the campaign did not end the war in Ireland as Marlborough hoped, it taught him the significance of the minutiae of logistics, and the importance of cooperation and tact when working alongside other senior Allied commanders. It would, however, be more than ten years before he once again took charge in the field.

=== Dismissal and disgrace ===
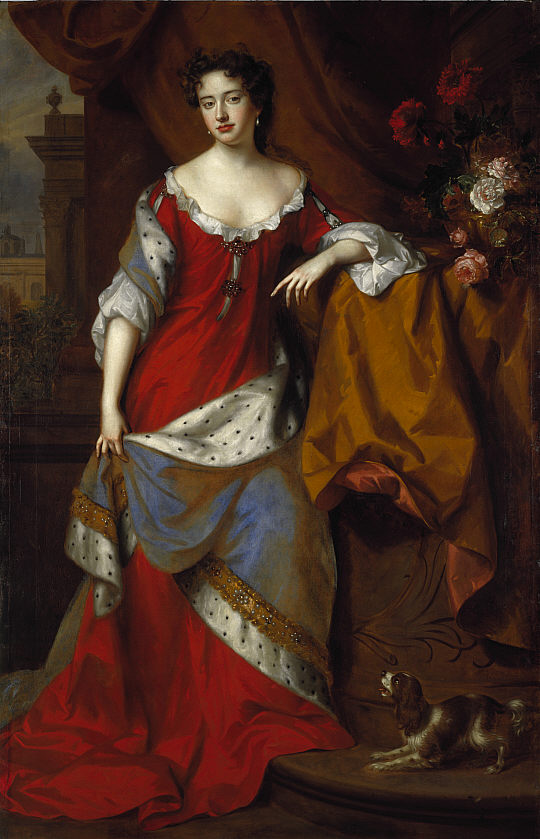
Princess Anne 1683 by Willem Wissing. When Mary died childless in 1694 (O.S.), Anne, her sister, became heir apparent.

William III recognised Marlborough's qualities as a soldier and strategist, but the refusal of the Order of the Garter and failure to appoint him Master-General of the Ordnance rankled with the ambitious Earl; nor did Marlborough conceal his bitter disappointment behind his usual bland discretion. Using his influence in Parliament and the army, Marlborough aroused dissatisfaction concerning William's preferences for foreign commanders, an exercise designed to force the King's hand. Aware of this, William, in turn, began to speak openly of his distrust of Marlborough; the Elector of Brandenburg's envoy to London overheard the King remark that he had been treated – "so infamously by Marlborough that, had he not been King, he would have felt it necessary to challenge him to a duel".

Since January 1691 Marlborough had been in contact with the exiled James II in Saint-Germain, anxious to obtain the erstwhile King's pardon for deserting him in 1688 – a pardon essential for the success of his future career in the not altogether unlikely event of a Jacobite restoration. James himself maintained contact with his supporters in England whose principal object was to re-establish him upon his throne. William was well aware of these contacts (as well as others such as Baron Godolphin and the Duke of Shrewsbury), but their double-dealing was seen more like an insurance policy, rather than as an explicit commitment. Marlborough did not wish for a Jacobite restoration, but William was conscious of his military and political qualities, and the danger the Earl posed: "William was not prone to fear", wrote Thomas Macaulay, "but if there was anyone on earth that he feared, it was Marlborough".

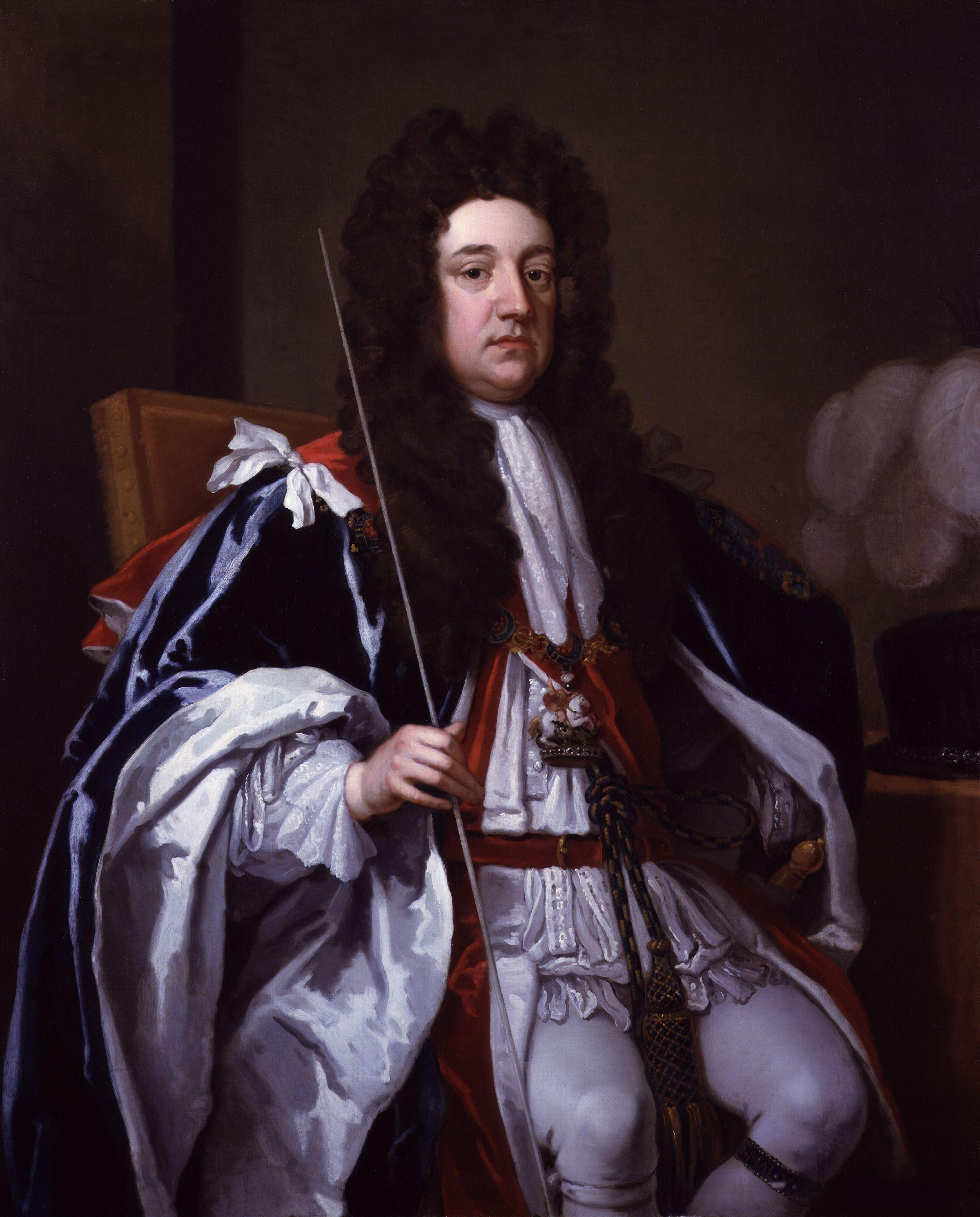
Sidney Godolphin, Lord Treasurer, Chief Minister and fellow Tory friend of Marlborough

By the time William and Marlborough had returned from an uneventful campaign in the Spanish Netherlands in October 1691, their relationship had further deteriorated. In January 1692, the Queen, angered by Marlborough's intrigues in Parliament, the army, and even with Saint-Germain, ordered Anne to dismiss Sarah from her household – Anne refused. This personal dispute precipitated Marlborough's dismissal. On 30 January 1692 (20 January 1691 O.S.), the Earl of Nottingham, Secretary of State, ordered Marlborough to dispose of all his posts and offices, both civil and military, and consider himself dismissed from all appointments and forbidden the court. No reasons were given but Marlborough's chief associates were outraged: Shrewsbury voiced his disapproval and Godolphin threatened to retire from government. Admiral Russell, now commander-in-chief of the Navy, personally accused the King of ingratitude to the man who had "set the crown upon his head".

=== High treason ===
The nadir of Marlborough's fortunes had not yet been reached. The spring of 1692 brought renewed threats of a French invasion and new accusations of Jacobite treachery. Acting on the testimony of one Robert Young, the Queen had arrested all the signatories to a letter purporting the restoration of James II and the seizure of William III. Marlborough, as one of these signatories, was sent to the Tower of London on 4 May (O.S.) where he languished for five weeks; his anguish compounded by the news of the death of his younger son Charles on 22 May (O.S.). Young's letters were eventually discredited as forgeries and Marlborough was released on 15 June (O.S.), but he continued his correspondence with James, leading to the celebrated incident of the "Camaret Bay letter" of 1694.

For several months the Allies had been planning an attack on Brest, the French port in the West of Brittany. The French had received intelligence alerting them to the imminent assault, enabling Marshal Vauban to strengthen its defences and reinforce the garrison. Inevitably the attack on 18 June led by Thomas Tollemache ended in disaster; most of his men were killed or captured, and Tollemache died of his wounds shortly afterward. Despite lacking evidence, Marlborough's detractors claimed that it was he who had alerted the enemy. Macaulay states that in a letter on 3 May 1694 Marlborough betrayed the Allied plans to James, thus ensuring that the landing failed and that Tollemache, a talented rival, was killed or discredited as a direct result. Historians such as John Paget and C. T. Atkinson conclude that he probably did write the letter, but did so only when he knew that it would be received too late for its information to be of any practical use (the plan of the attack on Brest was widely known, and the French had already begun to strengthen their defences in April). To Richard Holmes, the evidence linking Marlborough with the Camaret Bay letter (which no longer exists), is slender, concluding, "It is very hard to imagine a man as careful as Marlborough, only recently freed from suspicion of treason, writing a letter which would kill him if it fell into the wrong hands". However, David Chandler surmises that "the whole episode is so obscure and inconclusive that it is still not possible to make a definite ruling".

=== Reconciliation ===
Mary's death on 28 December 1694 (O.S.) eventually led to a formal but cool reconciliation between William III and Anne, now heir to the throne. Marlborough hoped that the rapprochement would lead to his own return to office, but although he and Lady Marlborough were allowed to return to court, the Earl received no offer of employment.

In 1696 Marlborough, together with Godolphin, Russell, and Shrewsbury, was yet again implicated in a treasonous plot with James II, this time instigated by the Jacobite militant John Fenwick. The accusations were eventually dismissed as a fabrication and Fenwick executed – the King himself had remained incredulous – but it was not until 1698, a year after the Treaty of Ryswick brought an end to the Nine Years' War, that the corner was finally turned in William's and Marlborough's relationship. On the recommendation of Lord Sunderland (whose wife was a close friend of Lady Marlborough), William eventually offered Marlborough the post of governor to the Duke of Gloucester, Anne's eldest son; he was also restored to the Privy Council, together with his military rank. (Note: Hibbert 2001, p. 80 Marlborough's son John, was appointed Master of the Horse at a salary of £500 a year.) When William left for Holland in July, Marlborough was one of the Lords Justices left running the government in his absence; but striving to reconcile his close Tory connections with that of the dutiful royal servant was difficult, leading Marlborough to complain – "The King's coldness to me still continues".

== War of the Spanish Succession (1701–1714) ==
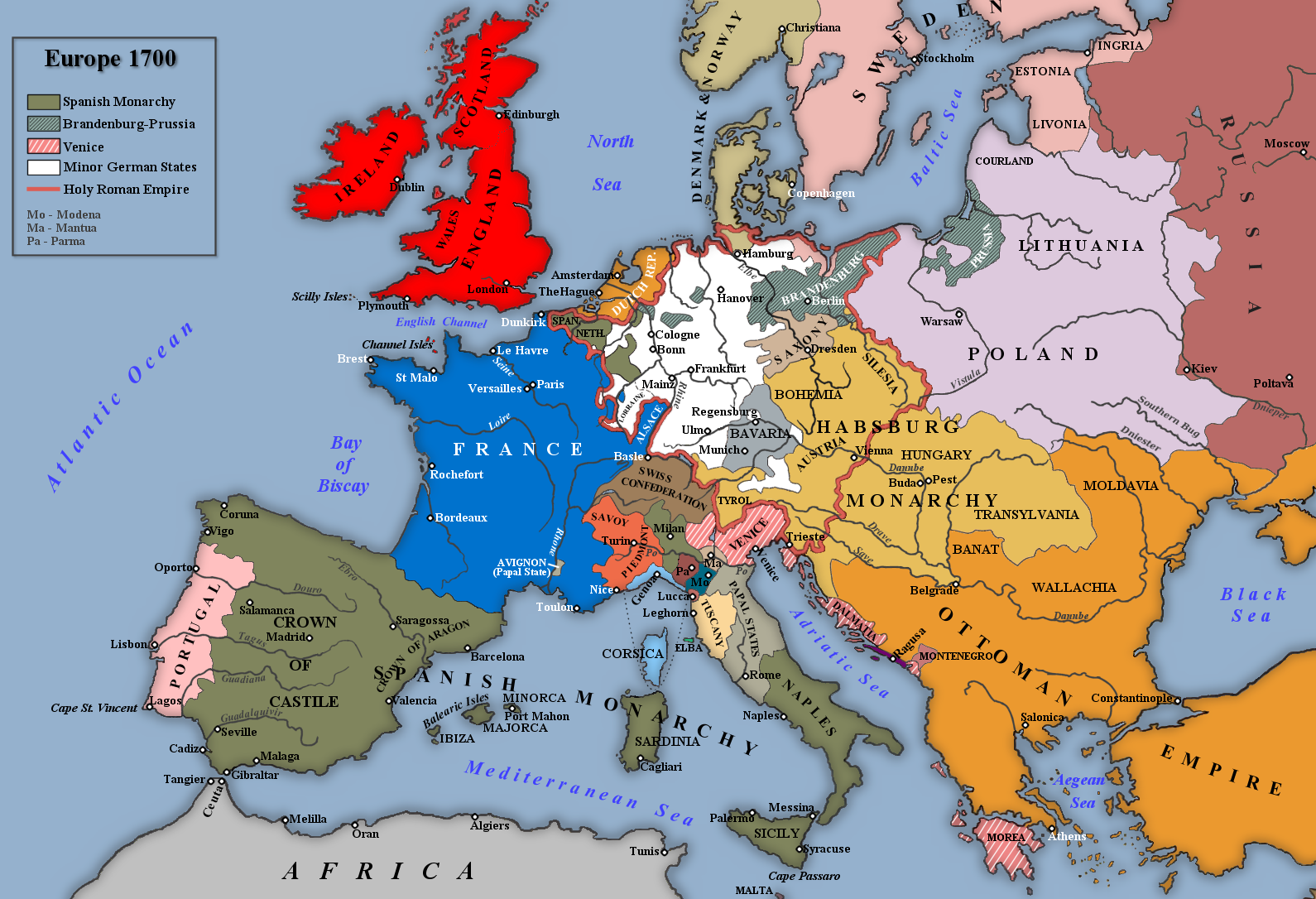
Europe in 1700; Marlborough fought principally in the Low Countries

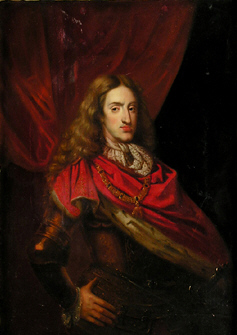
Charles II, King of Spain (1665–1700), whose death triggered the war

In the late 17th and early 18th centuries, the single most important theme in European politics was the rivalry between the two great dynasties of the continent: the House of Habsburg and the House of Bourbon. In 1665, the infirm and sickly Habsburg Charles II became the King of Spain. Spain was no longer the dominant power it once had been, but remained a vast global empire, with possessions in Italy, the Spanish Netherlands, the Philippines, and large parts of the Americas. It proved remarkably resilient; when Charles died childless in 1700, the Spanish Empire was largely intact and had even expanded in areas like the Pacific. Its possession could change the balance of European power in favour of either Bourbon France or Habsburg Austria.

Attempts to partition the Empire between the French and Austrian candidates or install an alternative from the Bavarian Wittelsbach dynasty failed. When Charles died, he left his throne to Louis XIV's grandson, who became Philip V of Spain on 16 November 1700. However, this was on the condition that Philip renounced his claim to the French throne; Louis' decision to ignore this once again threatened French domination over Europe and was the impetus for the Grand Alliance being reformed in 1701.

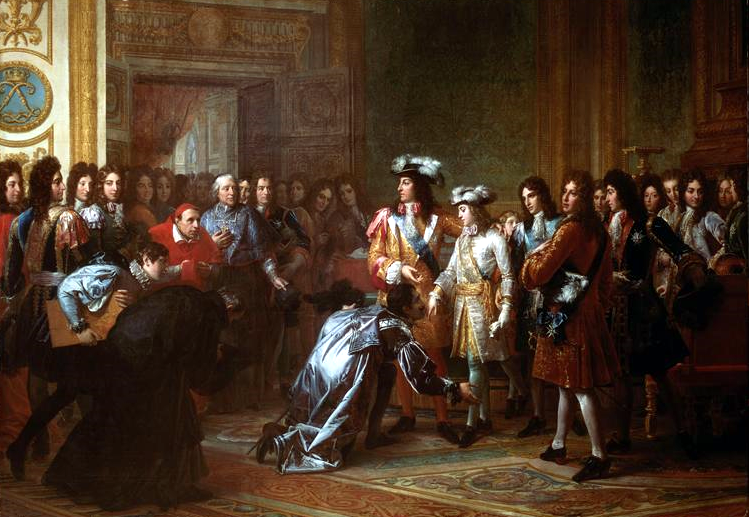
Philip of Anjou proclaimed Philip V of Spain, 16 November 1700

With his health deteriorating, William III appointed Marlborough Ambassador-Extraordinary and commander of English forces to attend the conference at the Hague. On 7 September 1701, the Treaty of the Second Grand Alliance nominated Emperor Leopold I's second son Archduke Charles as King of Spain instead of Philip. It was signed by England, the Dutch Republic and the Holy Roman Empire represented by Emperor Leopold I, head of the Austrian Habsburgs; however, the increasing independence of German states within the Empire meant Bavaria now allied itself with France. (Note: Gregg 1980, p. 126: Marlborough was also to settle the number of soldiers and sailors each coalition partner was to contribute, and supervise the organisation and supply of these troops. In these matters, he was ably assisted by Adam Cardonnel and William Cadogan.)

William III died on 8 March 1702 (O.S.) from injuries sustained in a riding accident and was succeeded by his sister-in-law Anne. While his death was expected, it deprived the Alliance of its most obvious leader although Marlborough's personal position was further strengthened by his close relationship with the new Queen. Anne appointed him Master-General of the Ordnance, a Knight of the Garter and Captain-General of her armies at home and abroad. Lady Marlborough was made Groom of the Stool, Mistress of the Robes and Keeper of the Privy Purse giving them a combined annual income of over £60,000 and unrivaled influence at court. (Note: Gregg 1980, p. 153 £4 million in today's money.)

During the war, Marlborough, along with Grand Pensionary Anthonie Heinsius and Prince Eugene of Savoy, formed the triumvirate that, in various respects, governed Europe during the War of the Spanish Succession.

=== Early campaigns ===
On 4 May 1702 (O.S.), England formally declared war on France, and Marlborough was given supreme command over the Anglo-Dutch army. News of his appointment led to some consternation, as he had never commanded a field army and had less military experience than dozen or so Dutch and German generals now under his command. Moreover, since he was an Englishman the Dutch States General wanted to prevent English political and military interests from being prioritised over those of the Dutch. As such, the States General placed severe limits on his military powers, which were defined in 12 articles. The most notable articles stated that:

1. (Article 2) Marlborough was only allowed to command Dutch troops that were part of the combined Anglo-Dutch field army.
2. (Article 3) Marlborough always had to formulate his operational plans in consultation with the highest-ranking Dutch general, (Note: Athlone until 1703, Overkirk from 1704 to 1708 and Tilly from 1708.) who was also authorised to ask his subordinates for advice.
3. (Article 4) Marlborough had to take all his decisions in agreement with the Dutch general and field deputies.
4. (Article 6) Marlborough was not allowed to give orders to Dutch troops independently of senior Dutch officers.

As supreme commander of the Anglo-Dutch army, he had to coordinate all his plans with highest-ranking Dutch commander and had the power to give orders to the other Dutch officers only when their troops were in action with his own. In cases of disagreement between Marlborough and the Dutch general, Marlborough could not push through his plan; instead, the Dutch deputies, the political representatives of the States General, had to make the final decision. This meant that he often had to rely on his powers of tact and persuasion, and gain the consent of accompanying Dutch field deputies. The Dutch were primarily concerned by the threat of a French invasion, yet despite their initial lassitude the Allied campaign in the Low Countries (the war's principal theatre) began well for Marlborough. After outmanoeuvring Marshal Boufflers, he and Athlone captured Venlo, Roermond, Stevensweert and Liège, for which in December a grateful Queen publicly proclaimed Marlborough a duke. (Note: Chandler 1973, p. 107 The Queen also granted him £5,000 annually for life, but Parliament refused. Sarah, indignant at this ingratitude, suggested he refuse the title.)

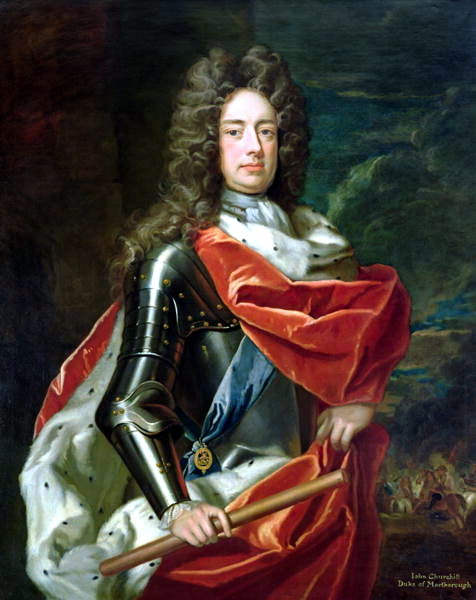
John Churchill c. 1702

On 9 February 1703 (O.S.), soon after the Marlboroughs' elevation, their daughter Elizabeth married Scroop Egerton, 1st Earl of Bridgewater. This was followed in the summer by an engagement between Mary and John Montagu, heir to the Earl of, and later Duke of Montagu, (they later married on 20 March 1705 (O.S.)). Their two older daughters were already married: Henrietta to Godolphin's son Francis in April 1698, and Anne to the hot-headed and intemperate Charles Spencer, Earl of Sunderland in 1700. (Note: Gregg 1980, p. 118 Marlborough himself was not keen on the marriage but Sarah, enchanted by Sunderland's Whig ideology and intellectual prowess, was decidedly more enthusiastic.) However, Marlborough's hopes of founding a great dynasty of his own reposed in his eldest and only surviving son, John, who, since his father's elevation, had borne the courtesy title of Marquess of Blandford. But while studying at Cambridge in early 1703, the 17-year-old was stricken with severe smallpox. His parents rushed to be by his side, but on Saturday morning, 20 February (O.S.), the boy died, plunging the duke into "the greatest sorrow in the world".

Bearing his grief, and leaving Sarah to hers, the Duke returned to The Hague at the beginning of March. By now Marshal Villeroi had replaced Boufflers as commander in the Spanish Netherlands, but although Marlborough was able to take Bonn, Huy, and Limbourg in 1703, the "Great Design" – the Anglo-Dutch plan to secure Antwerp and thereby open the river lines into Flanders and Brabant – was left in ruins by Villeroi's initiative and poor Allied co-ordination, resulting in the near-disaster at the Battle of Ekeren on 30 June. Domestically the Duke also encountered problems. The moderate Tory ministry of Marlborough, the Lord Treasurer Godolphin, and the Speaker of the House of Commons Robert Harley, were hampered by, and often at variance with, their High Tory colleagues whose strategic policy favoured the full employment of the Royal Navy in pursuit of trade advantages and colonial expansion overseas. To the Tories an action at sea was preferable to one ashore: rather than attack the enemy where they were strongest the Tories proposed to attack Louis XIV and Philip V where they were weakest – in their colonial empires and on the high seas. In contrast, the Whigs, led by their Junto, enthusiastically supported the Ministry's Continental strategy of thrusting the army into the heart of France. This support wilted somewhat following the Allies' recent campaign, but the Duke, whose diplomatic tact had held together a very discordant Grand Alliance, was now a general of international repute, and the limited success of 1703 was soon eclipsed by the Blenheim campaign.

==== Blenheim and Ramillies ====
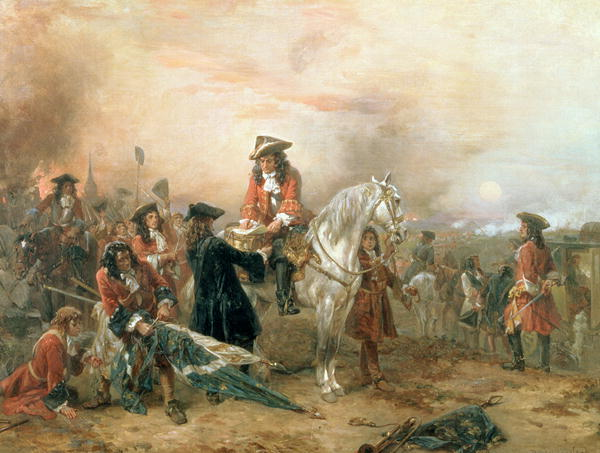
Marlborough writing the Blenheim despatch to Sarah, by Robert Alexander Hillingford. "I have no time to say more but to beg you will give my duty to the Queen, and let her know her army has had a glorious victory."

Pressed by the French and Bavarians to the west and Hungarian rebels to the east, Austria faced the real possibility of being forced out of the war. Concerns over Vienna and the situation in southern Germany convinced Marlborough of the necessity of sending aid to the Danube, but the scheme of seizing the initiative from the enemy was extremely bold. From the start, the Duke resolved to mislead the States General, who would never willingly permit any major weakening of Allied forces in the Spanish Netherlands. To this end, Marlborough moved English and Dutch troops to the Moselle (a plan approved of by The Hague), but once there he planned to slip the Dutch leash and march south to link up with Austrian forces in southern Germany. Dutch Grand Pensionary Anthonie Heinsius was likely secretly informed by Marlborough of his plan beforehand.

A combination of strategic deception and brilliant administration enabled Marlborough to achieve his purpose. After marching 250 miles (400 km) from the Low Countries, the Allies fought a series of engagements against the Franco-Bavarian forces ranged against them on the Danube. The first major encounter occurred on 2 July 1704 when Marlborough and Prince Louis of Baden stormed the Schellenberg heights at Donauwörth. However, the main event followed on 13 August when Marlborough – assisted by the Imperial commander, the able Prince Eugene of Savoy – delivered a crushing defeat on Marshal Tallard's and the Elector of Bavaria's army at the Battle of Blenheim. The whole campaign, which historian John A. Lynn describes as one of the greatest examples of marching and fighting before Napoleon, had been a model of planning, logistics, tactical and operational skill, the successful outcome of which had altered the course of the conflict – Bavaria was knocked out of the war, and Louis XIV's hopes of an early victory were destroyed. With the subsequent fall of Landau on the Rhine, and Trier and Trarbach on the Moselle, Marlborough now stood as the foremost soldier of the age. Even the Tories, who had declared that should he fail they would "break him up like hounds on a hare", could not entirely restrain their patriotic admiration.

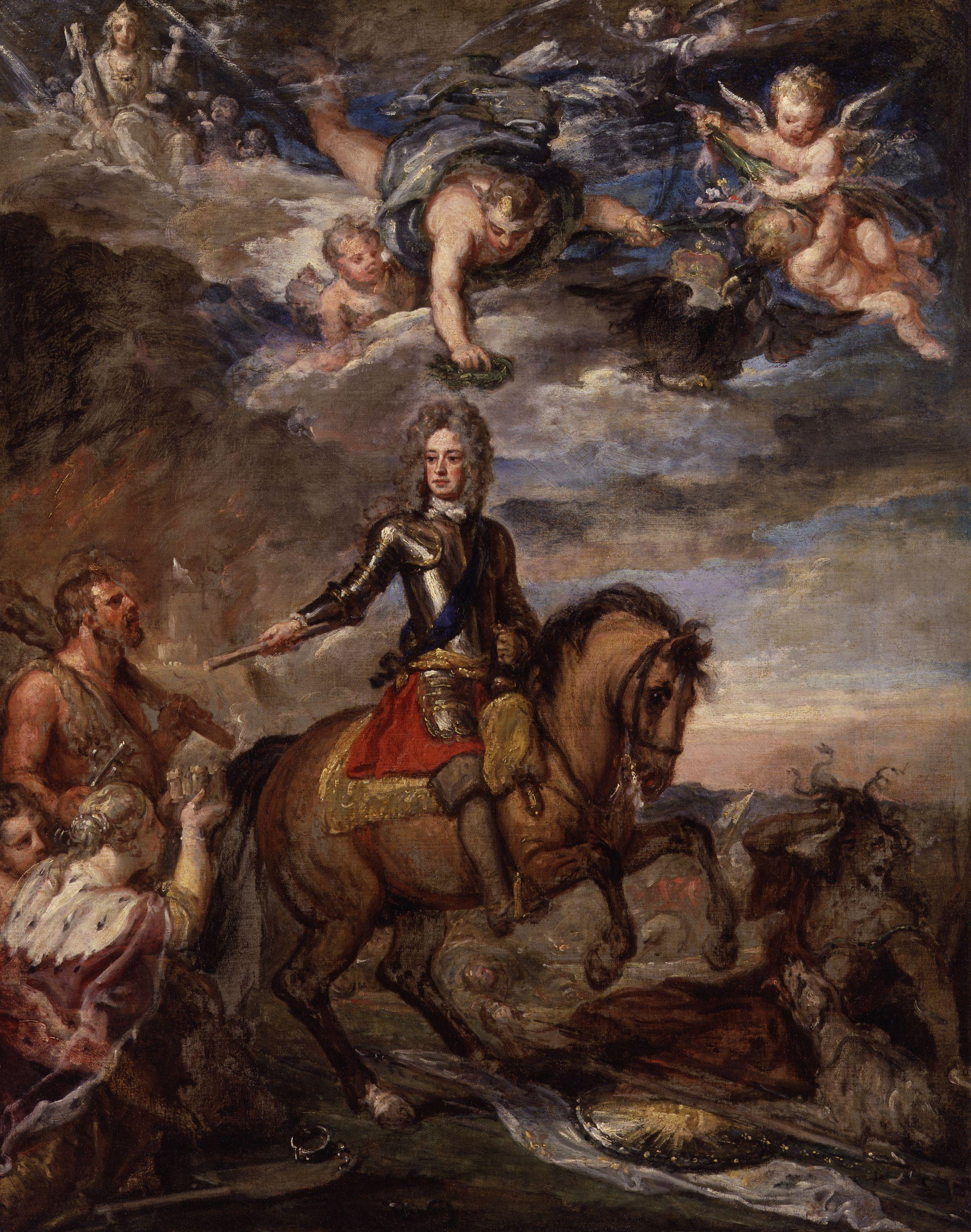
John Churchill, by Godfrey Kneller. This oil sketch shows Marlborough, victor at Blenheim and Ramillies, in triumph.

The Queen lavished upon her favourite the royal manor of Woodstock and the promise of a fine palace commemorative of his great victory at Blenheim; but since her accession her relationship with Sarah had become progressively distant. The Duke and Duchess had risen to greatness not least because of their intimacy with Anne, but the Duchess's relentless campaign against the Tories (Sarah was a firm Whig) isolated her from the Queen whose natural inclinations lay with the Tories, the staunch supporters of the Church of England. For her part, Anne, now Queen and no longer the timid adolescent so easily dominated by her more beautiful friend, had grown tired of Sarah's tactless political hectoring and increasingly haughty manner which, in the coming years, were to destroy their friendship and undermine the position of her husband.

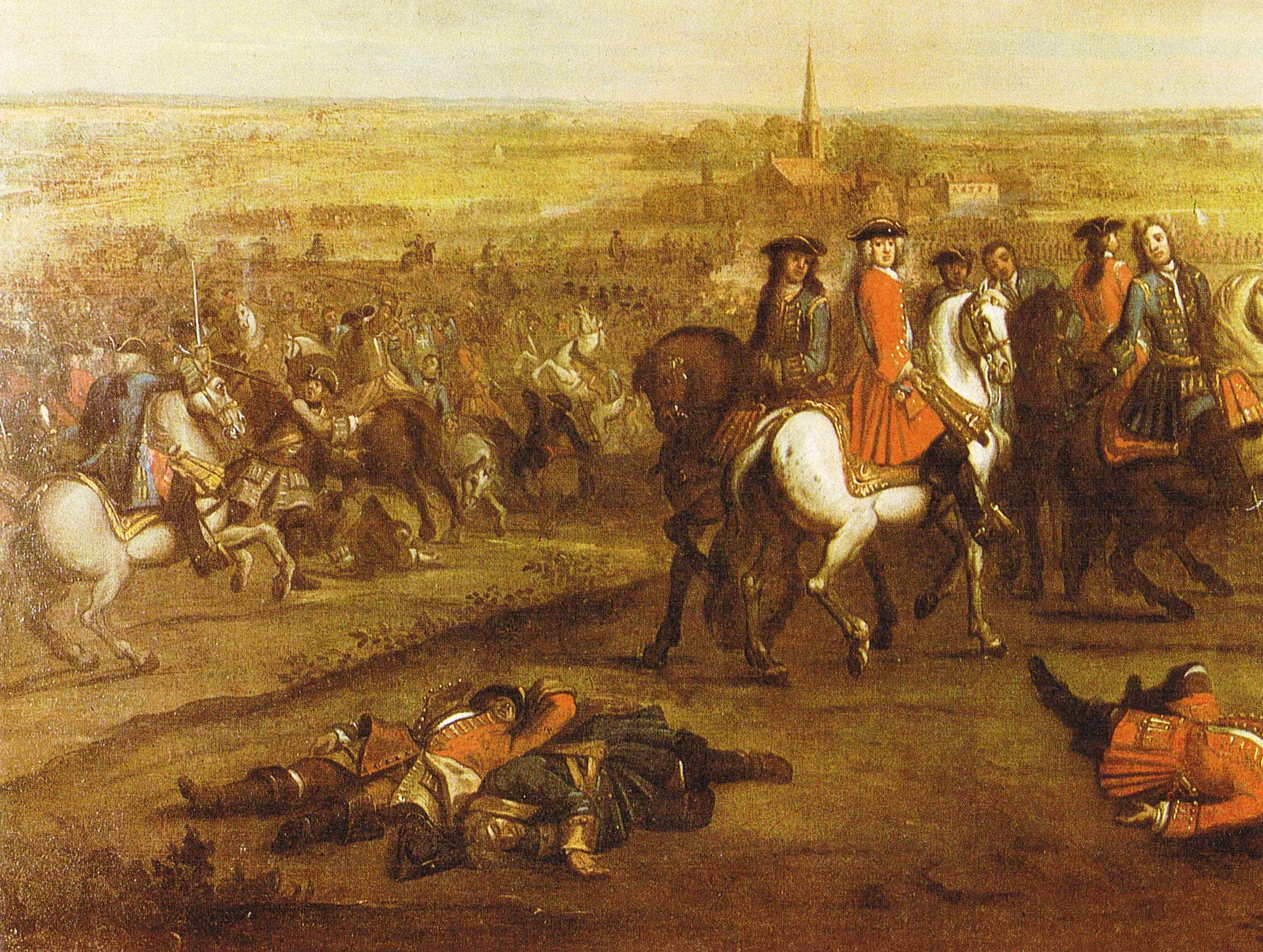
Marlborough at the Battle of Ramillies, 1706

During the Duke's march to the Danube Emperor Leopold I offered to make Marlborough a prince of the Holy Roman Empire in the small principality of Mindelheim. (Note: The Bavarian estate had been confiscated from the Elector and effectively occupied after Blenheim.) The Queen enthusiastically agreed to this elevation, but after the successes of 1704, the campaign of 1705 brought little reason for satisfaction on the Continent. The planned invasion of France via the Moselle Valley was frustrated by friend and foe alike, forcing the Duke to withdraw back towards the Low Countries. Although Marlborough penetrated the Lines of Brabant at Elixheim in July, Allied indecision meant that little was achieved after the breakthrough. The French and the Tories in England dismissed the questionable arguments that only Dutch obstructionism had robbed Marlborough of a great victory in 1705 and were confirmed in their belief that Blenheim had been a chance occurrence and that Marlborough was a general not to be feared.

The early months of 1706 also proved frustrating for the Duke as Louis XIV's generals gained early successes in Italy and Alsace. These setbacks thwarted Marlborough's original plans for the coming campaign, but he soon adjusted his schemes and marched into enemy territory. Louis XIV, equally determined to fight and avenge Blenheim, goaded his commander, Marshal Villeroi, to seek out Monsieur Marlbrouck. The subsequent Battle of Ramillies, fought in the Spanish Netherlands on 23 May, was perhaps Marlborough's most successful action, and one in which he had himself characteristically drawn his sword at the pivotal moment. For the loss of fewer than 5,000 dead and wounded (far fewer than Blenheim), his victory had cost the enemy some 15,000 casualties, inflicting in the words of Marshal Villars, "the most shameful, humiliating and disastrous of routs". The campaign was an unsurpassed operational triumph for the English general. Town after town subsequently fell to the Allies. "It really looks more like a dream than truth", wrote Marlborough to Sarah.

==== Falling out of favour ====
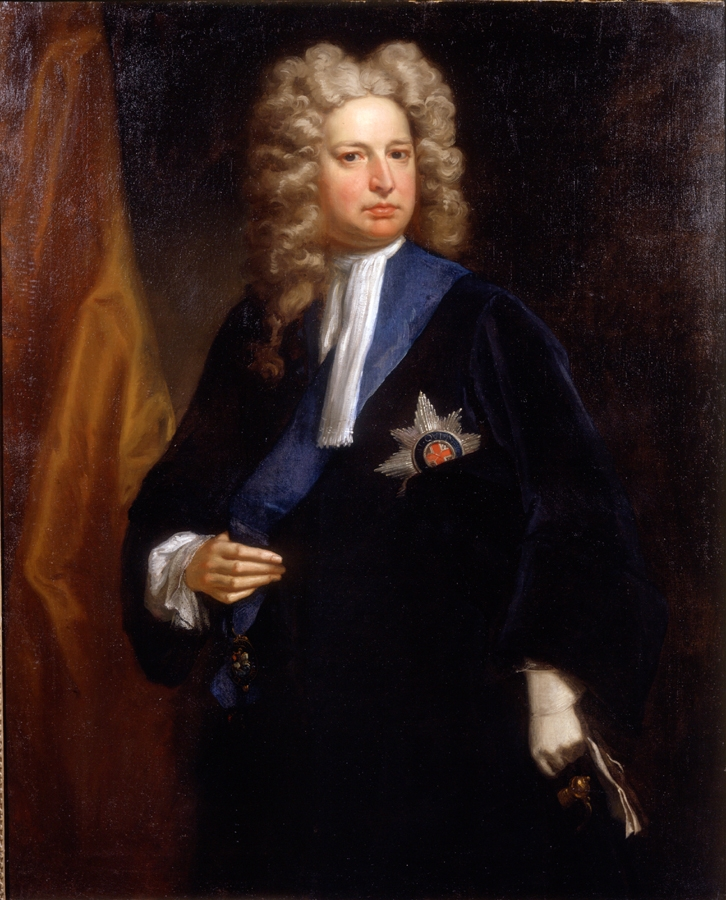
Robert Harley by Jonathan Richardson, c. 1710. Harley became Marlborough's nemesis.

While Marlborough fought in the Low Countries, a series of personal and party rivalries instigated a general reversal of fortune. The Whigs, who were the main prop of the war, had been laying siege to Godolphin. As a price for supporting the government in the next parliamentary session, the Whigs demanded a share of public office with the appointment of a leading member of their Junto, the Earl of Sunderland (Marlborough's son-in-law), to the post of Secretary of State. The Queen, who loathed Sunderland and the Junto, and who refused to be dominated by any single party, bitterly opposed the move; but Godolphin, increasingly dependent on Whig support, had little room for manoeuvre. With Sarah's tactless, unsubtle backing, Godolphin relentlessly pressed the Queen to submit to Whig demands. In despair, Anne finally relented and Sunderland received the seals of office; but the special relationship between Godolphin, Sarah, and the Queen had taken a severe blow and she began to turn increasingly to a new favourite – Sarah's cousin, Abigail Masham. Anne also became ever more reliant on the advice of Harley, who was convinced that the duumvirate's policy of appeasing the Whig Junto was unnecessary, had set himself up as an alternative source of advice to a sympathetic Queen.

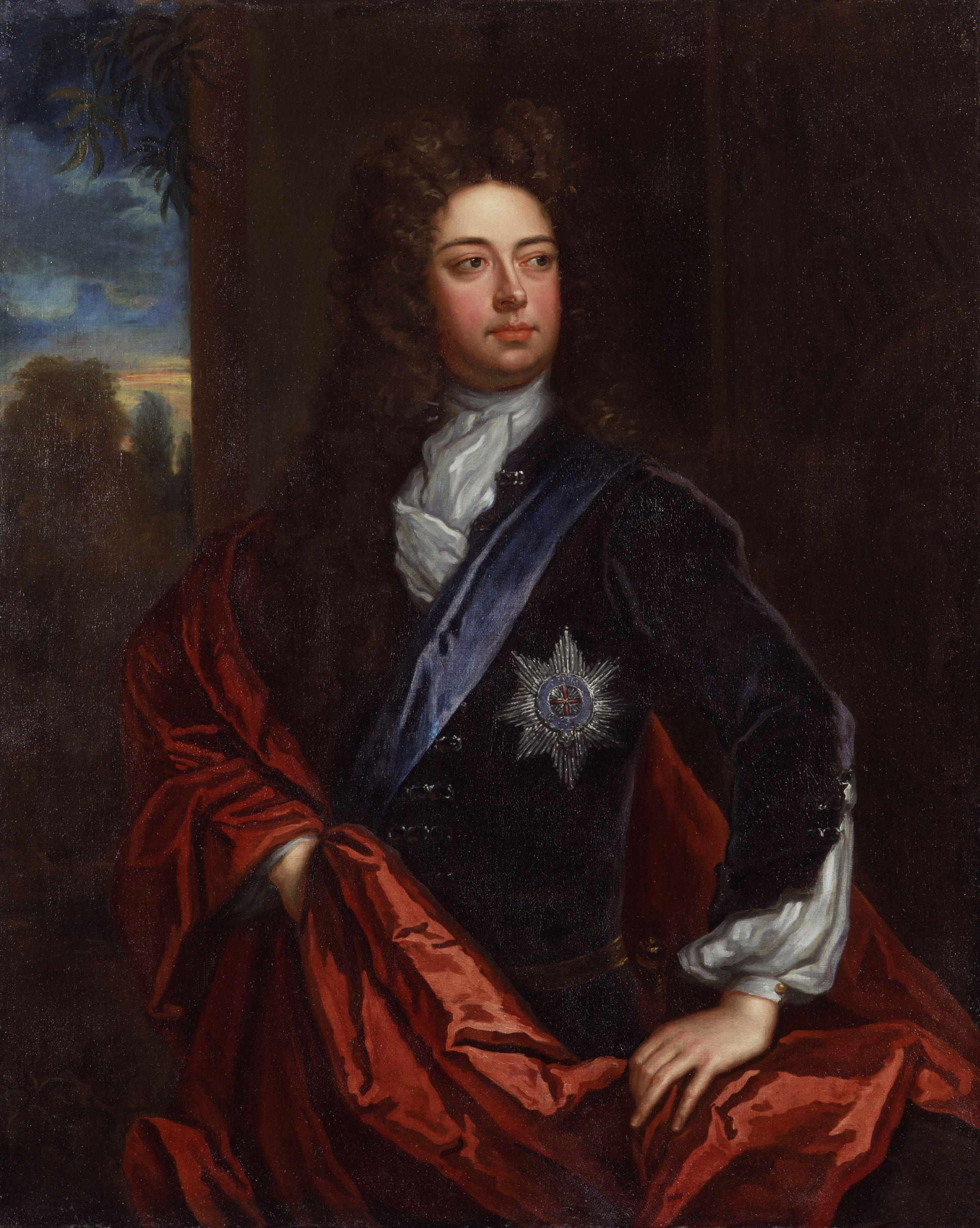
John Churchill, by Godfrey Kneller; late 17th or early 18th century

Following his victory at Ramillies, Marlborough returned to England and the acclamation of Parliament; his titles and estates were made perpetual upon his heirs, male or female, so "the memory of these deeds should never lack one of his name to bear it". However, the Allied successes were followed in 1707 with a resurgence in French arms on all fronts of the war, and a return to political squabbling and indecision within the Grand Alliance. The Great Northern War also threatened dire consequences. The French had hoped to entice King Charles XII of Sweden to attack the Empire regarding grievances over the Polish Succession. In a pre-campaign visit to the King's headquarters at Altranstädt, Marlborough's diplomacy helped placate Charles and prevent his interference regarding the Spanish Succession. Following the 1706 Treaty of Altranstädt, Tsar Peter the Great of Russia unsuccessfully offered the yet to be conquered Polish crown to Marlborough, among other candidates.

In Altranstädt, Marlborough reportedly approached Carl Piper, the most favoured of the King's advisers. Allegedly, he offered Piper a pension in exchange for advising Charles XII to launch an invasion of Russia, as this would distract Charles from interfering in the War of the Spanish Succession. Carl Piper was accused of having accepted Marlborough's bribe, advising Charles to invade Russia. Carl Piper denied having accepted Marlborough's offer, but he did admit that Marlborough provided his wife, Christina Piper with a pair of valuable earrings which she accepted, and it was the habit of Carl to personally refuse bribes but allow his wife to accept them and then follow her advice.

Nevertheless, major setbacks in Spain at Almansa and along the Rhine in Southern Germany, had caused Marlborough great anxiety. Prince Eugene's retreat from Toulon (Marlborough's major goal for 1707) ended any lingering hopes of a war-winning blow that year.

Marlborough returned from these tribulations to a political storm as the Ministry's critics turned to attack the overall conduct of the war. The Duke and Godolphin had initially agreed to explore a "moderate scheme" with Harley and reconstruct the government, but they were incensed when Harley privately criticised the management of the war in Spain to the Queen, and his associate Henry St John, the Secretary at War, raised the issue in Parliament. Convinced of Harley's caballing, the duumvirs threatened the Queen with resignation unless she dismissed him. Anne fought stubbornly to keep her favourite minister, but when the Duke of Somerset and the Earl of Pembroke refused to act without "the General nor the Treasurer", Harley resigned: Henry Boyle replaced him as Secretary of State, and his fellow Whig, Robert Walpole, replaced St John as Secretary at War. The struggle had given Marlborough a final lease of power but it was a Whig victory, and he had to a large extent lost his hold on the Queen.

==== Oudenaarde and Malplaquet ====
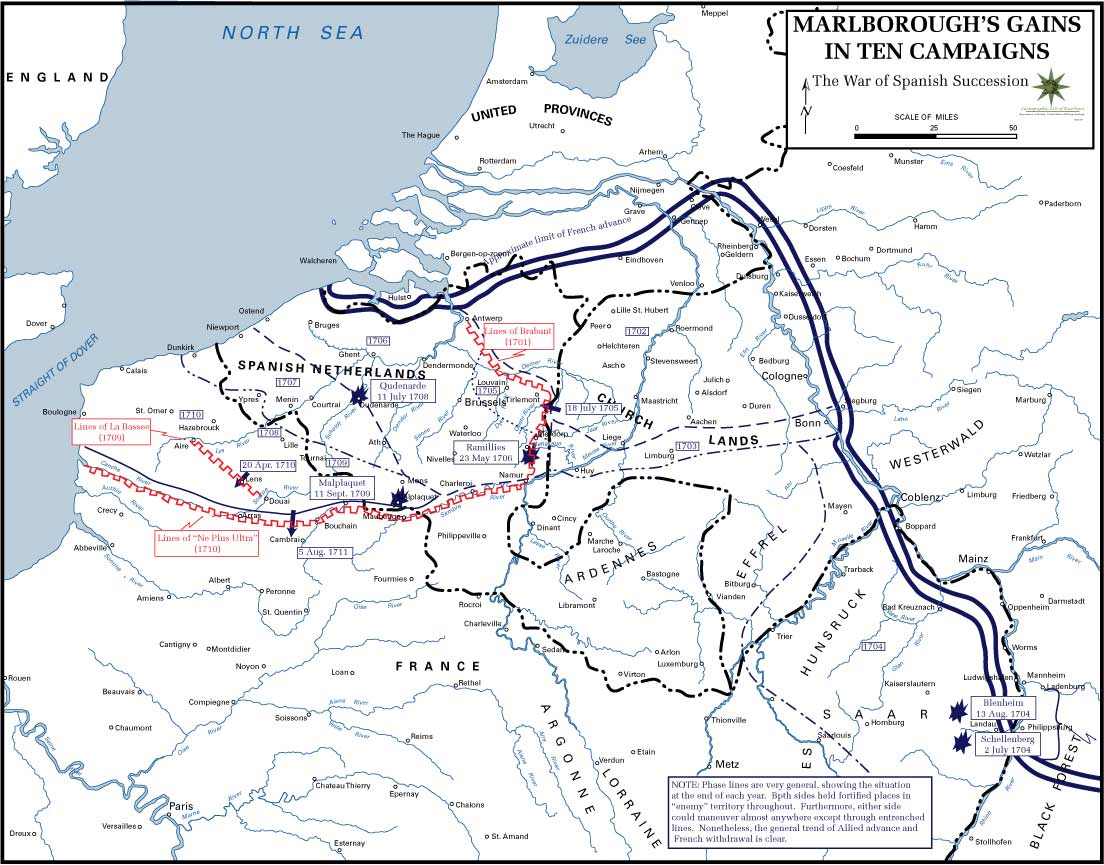
Marlborough's main battles and sieges in the War of the Spanish Succession. In the decade he held command, 1702–11, Marlborough fought five great battles and besieged and captured over 30 enemy fortresses.

The military setbacks of 1707 continued through the opening months of 1708, with the defection of Bruges and Ghent to the French. Marlborough remained despondent about the general situation, but his optimism received a major boost with the arrival in theatre of Prince Eugene, his co-commander at Blenheim. Heartened by the Prince's robust confidence, Marlborough set about to regain the strategic initiative. After a forced march, the Allies crossed the river Schelde at Oudenaarde just as the French army, under Marshal Vendôme and Louis, Duke of Burgundy, was crossing further north with the intent of besieging the place. Marlborough – with renewed self-assurance – moved decisively to engage them. His subsequent victory at the Battle of Oudenaarde on 11 July 1708 demoralised the French army in Flanders; his eye for ground, his sense of timing and his keen knowledge of the enemy were again amply demonstrated. The success, aided by the dissension of the two French commanders, restored the strategic initiative to the Allies, who now opted to besiege Lille, the strongest fortress in Europe. While the Duke commanded the covering force, Eugene oversaw the siege of the town, which surrendered on 22 October; however, it was not until 10 December that the resolute Boufflers yielded the citadel. Yet for all the difficulties of the winter siege, the campaign of 1708 had been a remarkable success, requiring superior logistical skill and organisation. The Allies re-took Brugge and Gent, and the French were driven out of almost all the Spanish Netherlands.

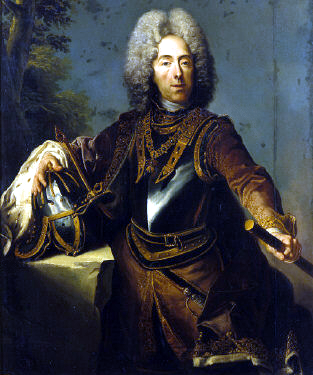
Prince Eugene of Savoy by Jacob van Schuppen. Apart from Ramillies, Eugene shared in Marlborough's great battles in the War of the Spanish Succession.

While Marlborough achieved honours on the battlefield, the Whigs, now in the ascendancy, drove the remaining Tories from the Cabinet. Marlborough and Godolphin, now distanced from Anne, would henceforth have to conform to the decisions of a Whig ministry, while the Tories, sullen and vengeful, looked forward to their former leaders' downfall. To compound his troubles, the Duchess, spurred on by her hatred of Harley and Abigail, had finally driven the Queen to distraction and wrecked what was left of their friendship. Sarah was retained in her court position out of necessity, as the price to be paid to keep her victorious husband at the head of the army.

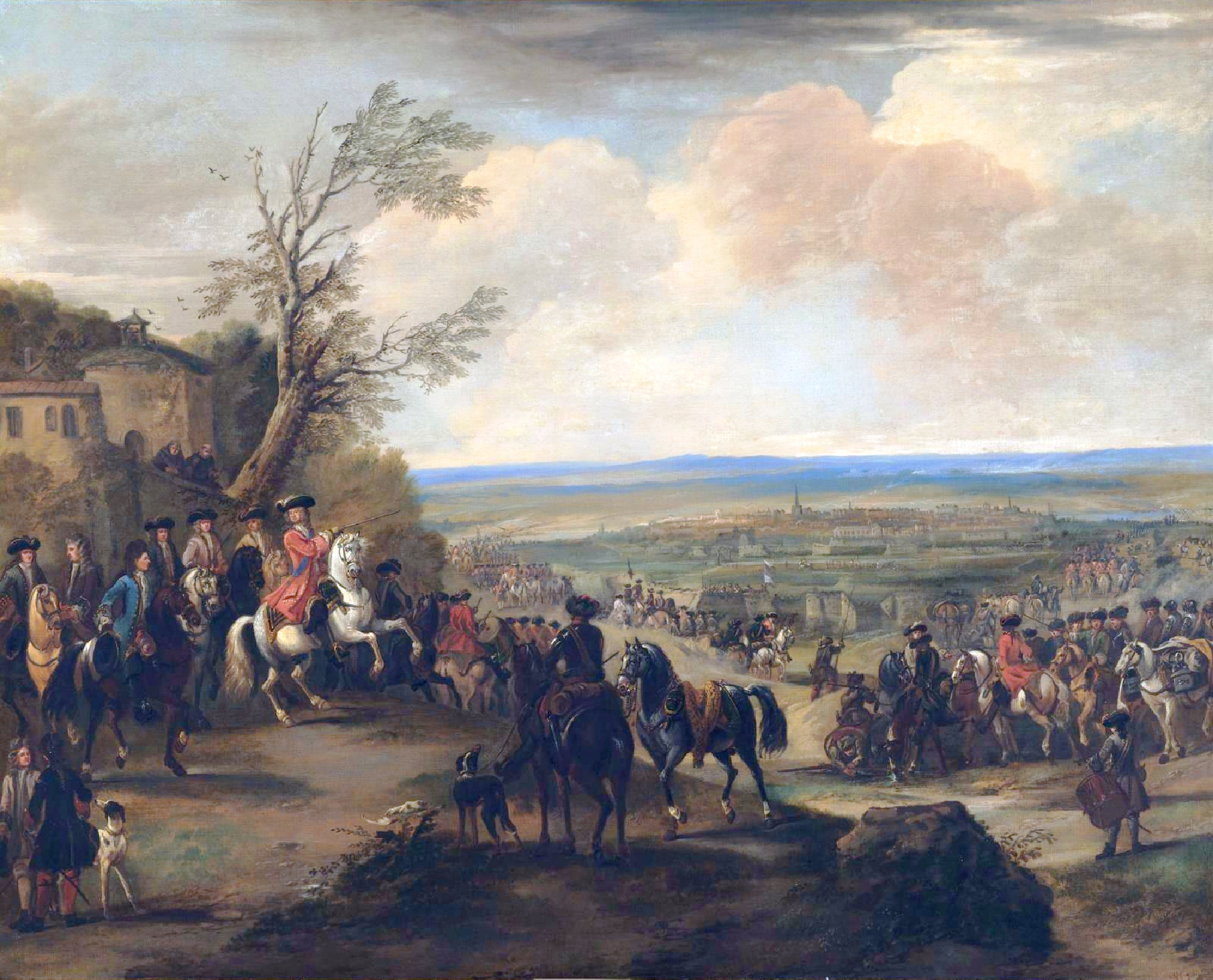
Marlborough at the Battle of Oudenaarde, 1708

After the recent defeats and one of the worst winters in modern history, France was on the brink of collapse. However, Allied demands at the peace talks in The Hague in April 1709 (principally concerning Article 37 that bound Louis XIV to hand over Spain within two months or face the renewal of the war), were rejected by the French in June. The Whigs, the Dutch, Marlborough and Eugene failed for personal and political reasons to secure a favourable peace, adhering to the uncompromising slogan "No peace without Spain" without any clear knowledge of how to accomplish it. All the while Harley, maintained up the backstairs by Abigail, rallied the moderates to his side, ready to play an ambitious and powerful middle part.

Marlborough returned to campaigning in the Low Countries in June 1709. After outwitting Marshal Villars to take the town of Tournai on 3 September (a major and bloody operation), the Allies turned their attention upon Mons, determined to maintain the ceaseless pressure on the French. With direct orders from the increasingly desperate Louis XIV to save the city, Villars advanced on the tiny village of Malplaquet on 9 September 1709 and entrenched his position. Two days later the opposing forces clashed in battle. On the Allied left flank the Prince of Orange led Dutch troops in desperate charges only to have them be cut to pieces. On the other flank, Eugene attacked and suffered almost as severely. Nevertheless, sustained pressure on his extremities forced Villars to weaken his centre, enabling Marlborough to break through and claim victory. Yet the cost was high: the allied casualty figures were approximately double that of the enemy (sources vary), leading Marlborough to admit – "The French have defended themselves better in this action than in any battle I've seen". A rumour among the French about Marlborough's death in this battle lead to the burlesque lament "Marlbrough s'en va-t-en guerre", (Marlborough has left for the war). The Duke proceeded to take Mons on 20 October, but on his return to England his enemies used the Malplaquet casualty figures to sully his reputation. Harley, now master of the Tory party, did all he could to persuade his colleagues that the pro-war Whigs – and by their apparent concord with Whig policy, Marlborough and Godolphin – were bent on leading the country to ruin.

=== Endgame ===
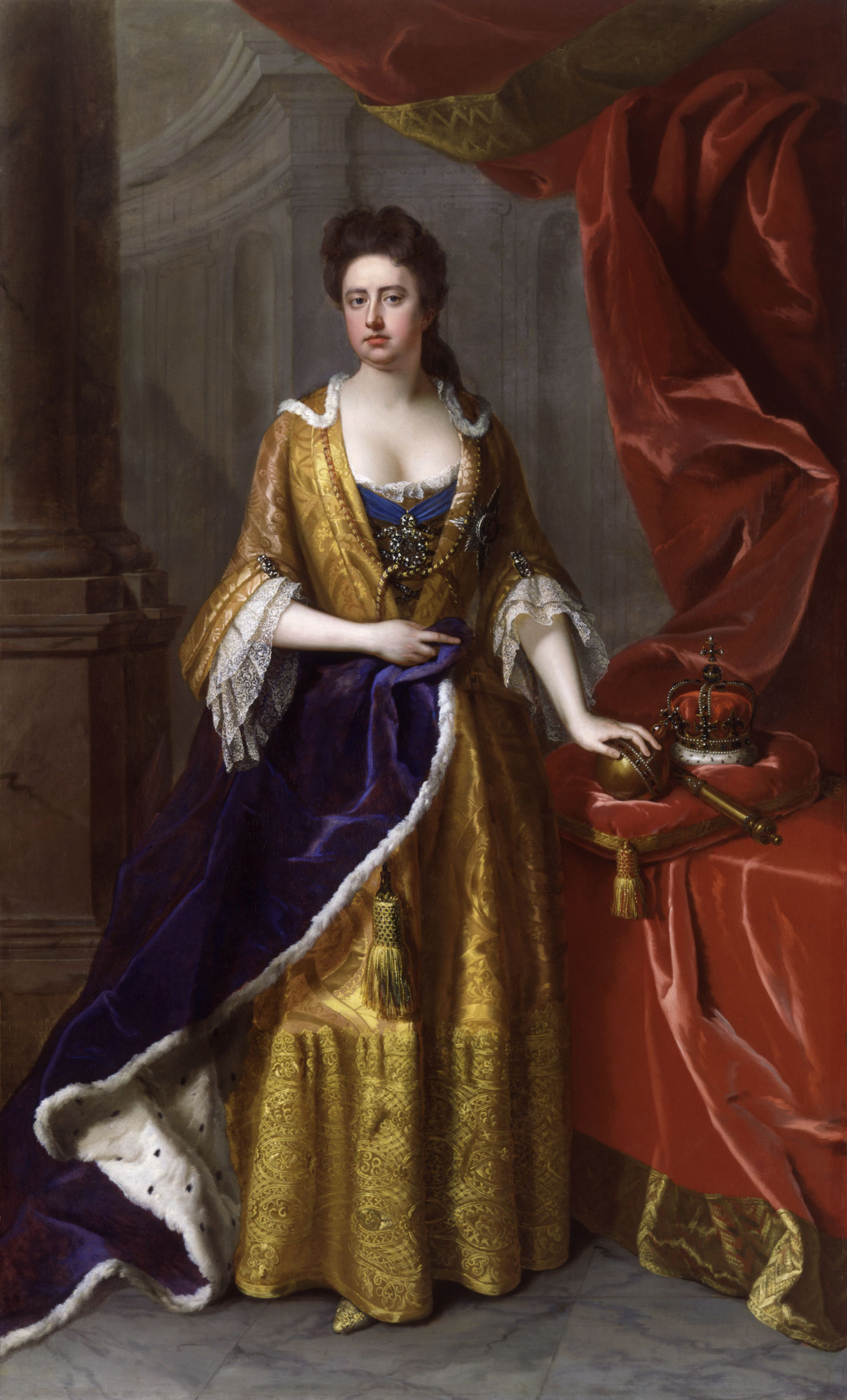
Queen Anne by Michael Dahl

The Allies had confidently expected that victory in a major set-piece battle would compel Louis XIV to accept peace on Allied terms, but after Malplaquet (the bloodiest battle of the war), that strategy had lost its validity: Villars had only to avoid defeat for a compromise peace settlement to become inevitable. In March 1710, fresh peace talks re-opened at Geertruidenberg, but again Louis XIV would not concede Whig demands to force his grandson, Philip V, from Spain. Publicly Marlborough toed the government line, but privately he had real doubts about pressing the French into accepting such a dishonourable course.

Although the Duke was only an observer at Geertruidenberg, the failed negotiations gave credence to his detractors that he was deliberately prolonging the war for his own profit. Yet it was with reluctance that he returned to campaigning in the spring, capturing Douai in June, before taking Béthune, and Saint-Venant, followed in November by Aire-sur-la-Lys. Nevertheless, support for the pro-war policy of the Whigs had, by this time, ebbed away. The Cabinet had long lacked cohesion and mutual trust (particularly following the Sacheverell affair) when in the summer the plan to break it up, prepared by Harley, was brought into action by the Queen. Sunderland was dismissed in June, followed by Godolphin (who had refused to sever his ties with Sarah) in August. Others followed. The result of the general election in October was a Tory landslide and a victory for the peace policy. Marlborough remained at the head of the army, however. The defeated Junto, the Dutch, Eugene, and the Emperor, implored him to stand by the common cause, while the new ministers, knowing they had to fight another campaign, required him to maintain the pressure on the enemy until they had made their own arrangements for the peace.

The Duke, "much thinner and greatly altered", returned to England in November. His relationship with Anne had suffered further setbacks in recent months (she had refused to grant him his requested appointment of Captain-General for life, and had interfered in military appointments). (Note: Against Marlborough's wishes, and prompted by Harley, the Queen appointed Lord Rivers for the post of Constable of the Tower, and awarded the colonelcy of the Oxford Dragoons to Jack Hill, brother of Abigail Masham.) The damage done to Marlborough's general standing was substantial because it was so visible. For now, though, the central issue was the Duchess whose growing resentment of Harley and Abigail had finally persuaded the Queen to be rid of her. Marlborough visited Anne on 17 January 1711 (O.S.) in a last attempt to save his wife, but she was not to be swayed, and demanded Sarah give up her Gold Key (the symbol of her office) within two days, warning, "I will talk of no other business till I have the key." (Note: Hibbert 2001, p. 268 Abigail Masham and the Duchess of Somerset divided between them Sarah's places at court, and in bitterness she retired to her newly built mansion of Marlborough House.)

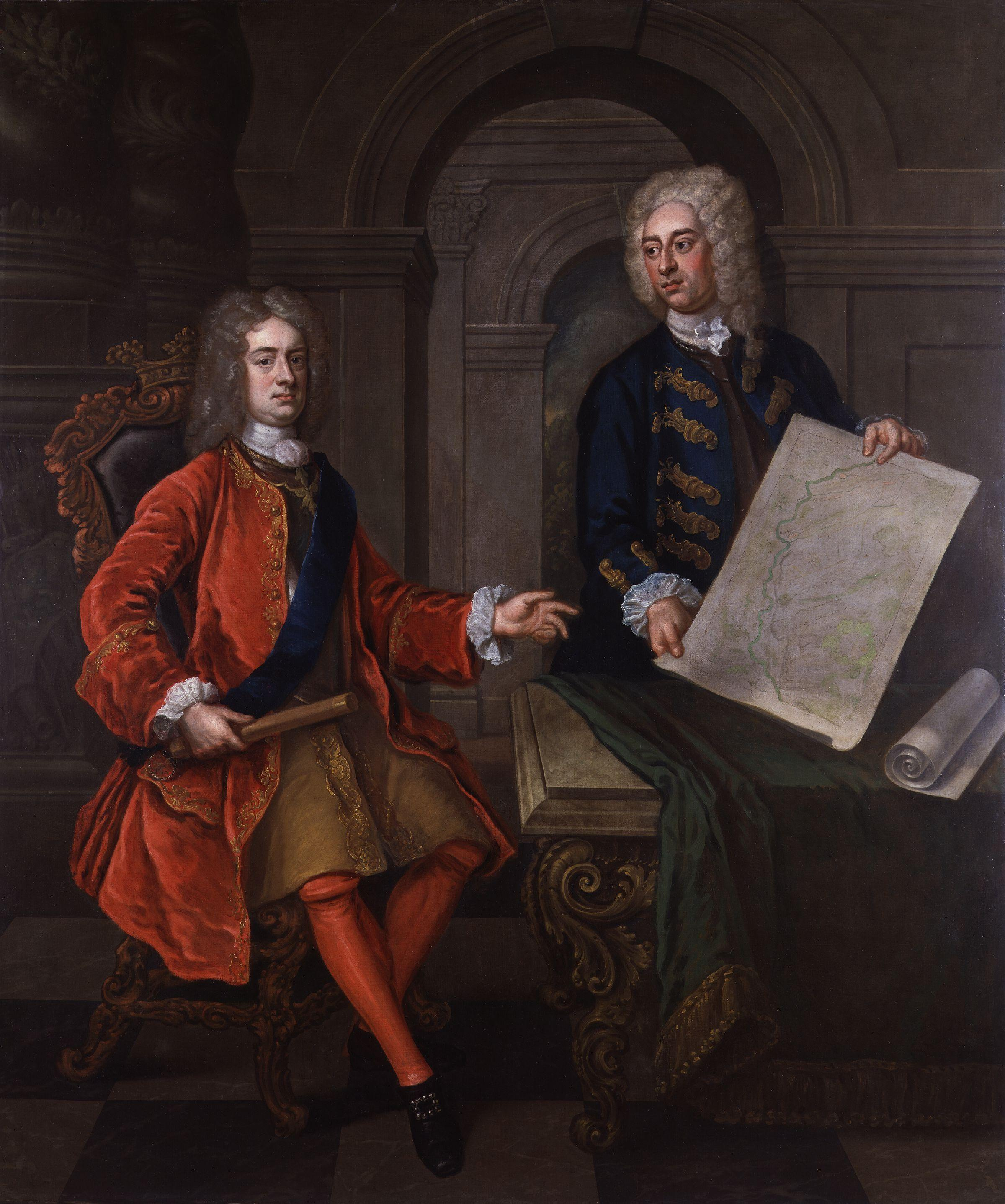
c. 1720 portrait of Marlborough and his chief engineer John Armstrong discussing the siege of Bouchain

Notwithstanding all this turmoil – and his declining health – Marlborough returned to The Hague in late February to prepare for what was to be his last campaign, and one of his greatest. Once again Marlborough and Villars formed against each other in line of battle, this time along the Avesnes-le-Comte–Arras sector of the Lines of Ne Plus Ultra. (Note: The lines of Ne Plus Ultra were the last and most imposing entrenched fortifications designed to halt enemy raids and hinder the movements of enemy armies. The lines of Ne Plus Ultra lines ran from the coast at Montreuil to the River Sambre (Lynn 1999, p. 79).) Expecting another onslaught on the scale of Malplaquet, the allied generals surmised that their commander, distressed from domestic turmoil, was leading them to an appalling slaughter. By an exercise of brilliant psychological deception, and a secretive night march covering nearly 40 miles in 18 hours, the Allies penetrated the allegedly impregnable lines without losing a single man; Marlborough was now in position to besiege the fortress of Bouchain. Villars, deceived and outmanoeuvred, was helpless to intervene, compelling the fortress's unconditional surrender on 12 September. Chandler writes:

The pure military artistry with which he repeatedly deceived Villars during the first part of the campaign has few equals in the annals of military history ... the subsequent siege of Bouchain with all its technical complexities, was an equally fine demonstration of martial superiority.

Marlborough's strategic gains in 1711 made it virtually certain that the Allies would march on Paris the following year, but Harley had no intention of letting the war progress that far and risk jeopardising the favourable terms secured from the secret Anglo-French talks (based on the idea that Philip V would remain on the Spanish throne) that had proceeded throughout the year. Marlborough had long had doubts about the Whig policy of "No Peace Without Spain", but he was reluctant to abandon his allies (including the Elector of Hanover, Anne's heir presumptive), and sided with the Whigs in opposing the peace preliminaries. Personal entreaties from the Queen (who had long tired of the war), failed to persuade the Duke. The Elector made it clear that he too was against the proposals, and publicly sided with the Whigs. Nevertheless, Anne remained resolute, and on 7 December 1711 (O.S.) she was able to announce that – "notwithstanding those who delight in the arts of war" – a sneer towards Marlborough – "both time and place are appointed for opening the treaty of a general peace".

=== Dismissal ===
To prevent the serious renewal of warfare in the spring, it was considered essential to replace Marlborough with a general more in touch with the Queen's ministers and less in touch with their allies. To do this, Harley (newly created Earl of Oxford) and St John first needed to bring charges of corruption against the Duke, completing the anti-Whig, anti-war picture that Jonathan Swift was already presenting to a credulous public through his pamphleteering, notably in his Conduct of the Allies (1711).

Two main charges were brought to the House of Commons against Marlborough: first, an assertion that over nine years he had illegally received more than £63,000 from the bread and transport contractors in the Netherlands; second, that he had taken 2.5% from the pay of the foreign troops in English pay, amounting to £280,000. Despite Marlborough's refutations (claiming ancient precedent for the first allegation, and, for the second, producing a warrant signed by the Queen in 1702 authorising him to make the deductions instead of secret service money for the war), the findings were enough for Harley to persuade the Queen to release her Captain-General. On 29 December 1711 (O.S.), before the charges had been examined, Anne, who owed to him the success and glory of her reign, sent her letter of dismissal: "I am sorry for your own sake the reasons have become so public which makes it necessary for me to let you know you have rendered it impracticable for you to continue yet longer in my service". (Note: Gregg 1980, p. 349 Marlborough threw the letter on the fire in disgust, but Oxford's memoranda contains an imperfect draft copy.) The Tory-dominated Parliament concluded by a substantial majority that "the taking of several sums of money annually by the Duke of Marlborough from the contractor for foraging the bread and wagons ... was unwarrantable and illegal", and that the 2.5% deducted from the pay of foreign troops "is public money and ought to be accounted for". When his successor, the Duke of Ormonde, left London for The Hague to take command of British forces he went, noted Bishop Burnet, with "the same allowances that had been lately voted criminal in the Duke of Marlborough".

The Allies were stunned by Marlborough's dismissal. The French, however, rejoiced at the removal of the main obstacle to the Anglo-French talks. Oxford (i.e. Harley) and St John had no intention of letting Britain's new Captain-General undertake any action, and issued Ormonde his "restraining orders" in May, forbidding him to use British troops in action against the French – an infamous step that ultimately ruined Eugene's campaign in Flanders. Marlborough continued to make his views known, but he was in trouble: attacked by his enemies and the government press; with his fortune in peril and Blenheim Palace still unfinished and running out of money; and with England split between Hanoverian and Jacobite factions, Marlborough thought it wise to leave the country. After attending Godolphin's funeral on 7 October (O.S.), he went into voluntary exile to the Continent on 1 December 1712 (O.S.).

== Later life ==
=== Return to favour ===
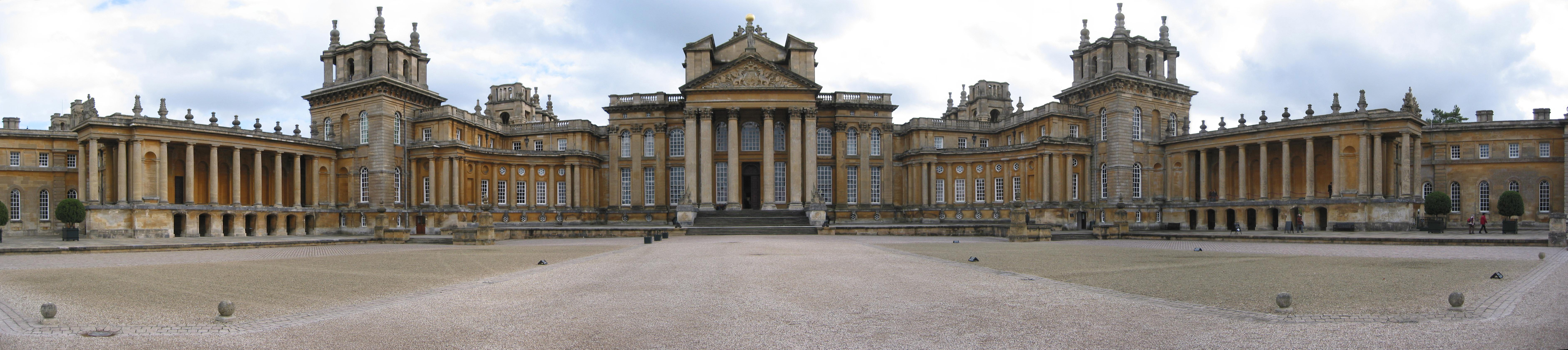
John Vanbrugh's Blenheim Palace. Begun in 1705, but plagued by financial troubles, this "pile of stones", as the Duchess resentfully called it, was finally completed in 1733.

Marlborough was welcomed and fêted by the people and courts of Europe, where he was not only respected as a great general but also as a prince of the Holy Roman Empire. Sarah joined him in February 1713 and was delighted, upon reaching Frankfurt in the middle of May, to see that the troops under Eugene's command paid her lord "all the respects as if he had been at his old post". Churchill was described as having been

about the middle height, and has the best figure in the world; his features are without fault, fine, sparkling eyes and good teeth ... In short, apart from his legs, which are too thin, he is one of the handsomest men ever seen ... His ambition knows no bounds.

Throughout his travels Marlborough remained in close contact with the Electoral court of Hanover, determined to ensure a bloodless Hanoverian succession on Anne's death. He also maintained correspondence with the Jacobites. The spirit of the age saw little wrong in Marlborough's continuing friendship with his nephew, the Duke of Berwick, James II's illegitimate son with Arabella but these assurances against a Jacobite restoration (which he had been taking out since the early years of William III, no matter how insincere), stirred Hanoverian suspicions, and perhaps prevented him from holding the first place in the counsels of the future George I.

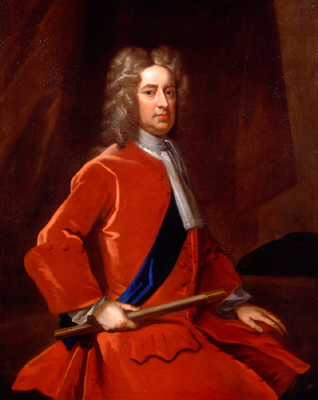
Marlborough by Enoch Seeman. This late portrait shows Marlborough during his retirement possibly 1716/17 after his stroke.

The representatives of France, Great Britain, and the Dutch Republic signed the Treaty of Utrecht on 11 April 1713 (N.S.) – the Emperor and his German allies, including the Elector of Hanover, continued with the war before finally accepting the general settlement the following year. The Treaty marked Britain's emergence as a great power. Domestically, however, the country remained divided between Whig and Tory, Jacobite and Hanoverian factions. By now Oxford and St John (Viscount Bolingbroke since 1712) – absorbed entirely by their mutual enmity and political squabbling – had effectively wrecked the Tory administration. Marlborough had been kept well informed of events while in exile and had remained a powerful figure on the political scene, not least because of the personal attachment the Queen still retained for him. After the death of his daughter Elizabeth from smallpox in March 1714, Marlborough contacted the Queen. Although the contents of the letter are unknown, Anne may likely have summoned him home. Either way, it seems that an agreement was reached to reinstate the Duke in his former offices.

Oxford's period of predominance was now at an end, and Anne turned to Bolingbroke and Marlborough to assume the reins of government and ensure a smooth succession. However, under the weight of hostility the Queen's health, already fragile, rapidly deteriorated, and on 1 August 1714 (O.S.) – the day the Marlboroughs returned to England – she died. The Privy Council immediately proclaimed the Elector of Hanover King George I of Great Britain. The Jacobites had proved incapable of action; what Daniel Defoe called the "solidity of the constitution" had triumphed, and the regents chosen by George prepared for his arrival.

=== Death ===
The Duke's return to favour under the House of Hanover enabled him to preside over the defeat of the 1715 Jacobite rising from London (although it was his former assistant, Cadogan, who directed the operations). However, his health was fading, and on 28 May 1716 (O.S.), shortly after the death of his daughter Anne, Countess of Sunderland, he suffered a paralytic stroke at Holywell House. This was followed by another, more serious stroke in November, this time at a house on the Blenheim estate. The Duke recovered somewhat, his speech had become slightly impaired, but it was not severe and continued to improve over time and his mind remained as sharp and clear as ever. He recovered enough to ride out to watch the builders at work on Blenheim Palace and attend the Lords to vote for Oxford's impeachment.

In 1719 the Duke and Duchess were able to move into the east wing of the unfinished palace, but Marlborough had only three years to enjoy it. While living at Windsor Lodge he suffered another stroke in June 1722, not long after his 72nd birthday and slipped into a coma. Finally, at 4 a.m on 16 June (O.S.), in the presence of his wife and two surviving daughters Henrietta Godolphin and Mary Montagu, the 1st Duke of Marlborough died. He was initially buried on 9 August (O.S.) in the vault at the east end of the Henry VII Chapel in Westminster Abbey, but following instructions left by Sarah, who died in 1744, Marlborough was moved to be by her side lying in the vault beneath the chapel at Blenheim. One newspaper described how the occasion was "celebrated with unparallel'd Magnificence", a fitting end for "he, who surpass'd all the Heroes of Antiquity".

== Legacy ==
=== Assessment ===
Historian John H. Lavalle argues that:

Marlborough's place as one of the finest soldiers Britain ever produced is well deserved. He possessed the personal courage, imagination, common sense, self-control, and quick wits that mark the best battlefield commanders. He had an unerring ability to sense an enemy's weaknesses and the ability to use stratagems to throw his enemy off balance.... It was in the realm of strategy, however, where Marlborough shone. As commander-in-chief of a coalition army, he could tolerate politicians, allies, and fools gladly. He also saw the potential of the recently introduced combination of flintlock and socket bayonet to restore the offensive...to warfare in an age when extensive fortifications, magazines, and the defensive dominated military thinking. Marlborough's attention to logistics allowed him to break free of the bonds of the magazine system and ensured that his soldiers were fed, clothed, and paid, earning him the loyalty of his troops and the nickname "Corporal John".

Marlborough was equally adept at both battle and siege. Robert Parker, who served under Marlborough, writes:

in the ten campaigns he made against [the French]; during all which time it cannot be said that he ever slipped an opportunity of fighting when there was any probability of coming at his enemy: and upon all occasions he concerted matters with so much judgment and forecast, that he never fought a battle which he did not gain, nor laid siege to a town which he did not take.

Sicco van Goslinga, a Dutch field deputy who worked closely with Marlborough, frequently praised his military abilities and considered him a genius, but gave a mixed view of Marlborough's personal character. In Van Goslinga's opinion, Marlborough often faked his sincerity along with being overly ambitious and greedy. He also wrote that

He [Marlborough] was sometimes indecisive, especially on the eve of some great undertaking, shrank from difficulties, and sometimes allowed himself to be beaten down by adversity... He knows little about military discipline and gives too much freedom to the soldiers, causing them to commit horrible excesses.

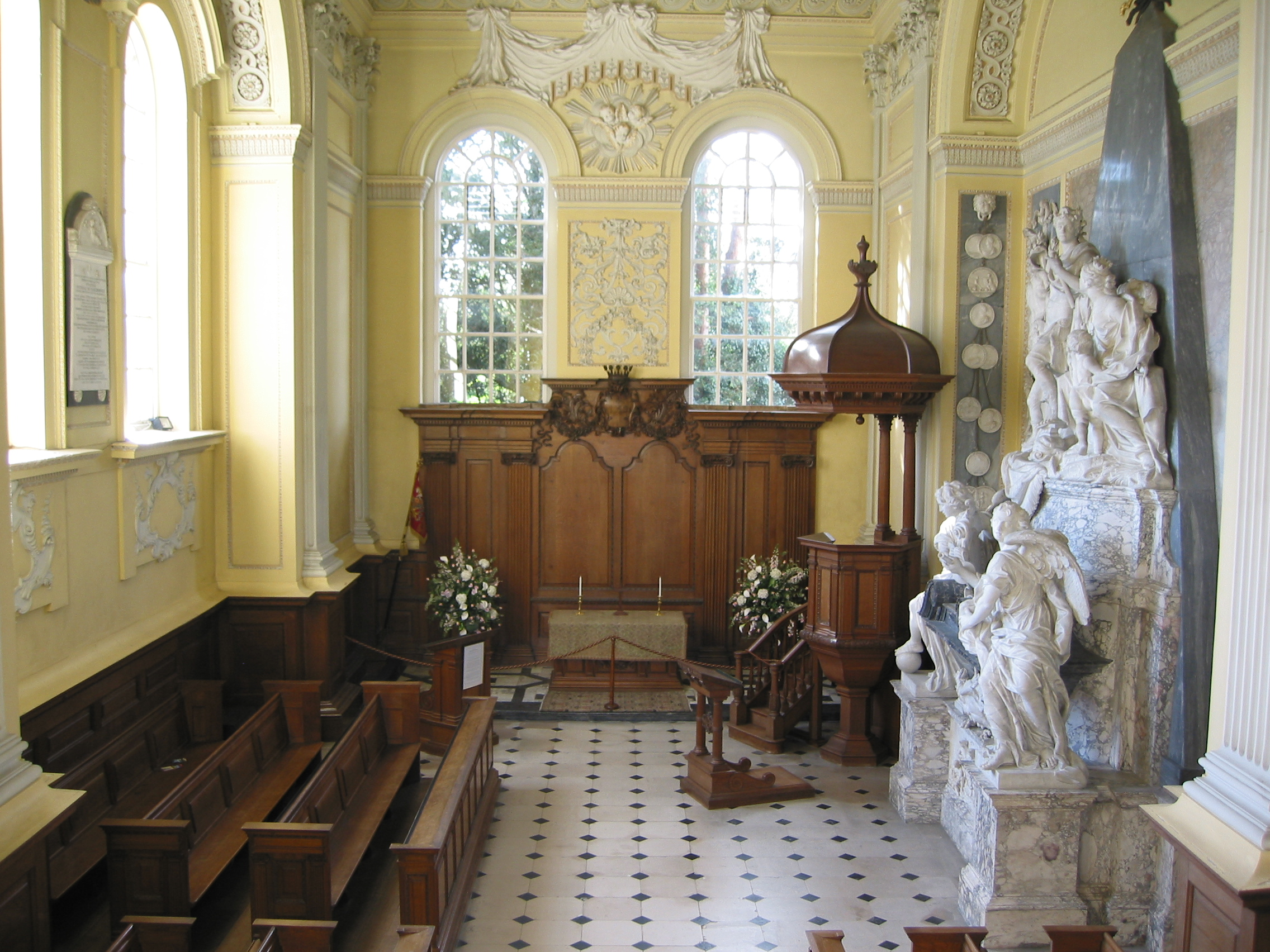
Resting place of the Duke and Duchess in the chapel at Blenheim Palace

To military historians David Chandler and Richard Holmes, Marlborough is the greatest British commander in history, an assessment that is shared by others, including the Duke of Wellington who could "conceive nothing greater than Marlborough at the head of an English army". However the 19th century Whig historian Thomas Macaulay denigrated Marlborough throughout the pages of his History of England. In the words of historian John Wilson Croker he pursued the Duke with "more than the ferocity, and much less than the sagacity, of a bloodhound", though according to G. M. Trevelyan Macaulay "instinctively desired to make Marlborough's genius stand out bright against the background of his villainy". It was largely in response to Macaulay that a descendant, Winston Churchill, wrote his laudatory biography, Marlborough: His Life and Times (4 vol. 1933–1938).

Unlike Macaulay, the 19th-century Dutch military historian Willem Jan Knoop criticised not only Marlborough’s character but also his generalship. In Knoop's view, Marlborough was hardly comparable to Wellington, and his successes were largely owed to the quality of the Dutch troops, skilled subordinates, cooperation with Prince Eugene, and the ineptitude of his opponents. While less harsh, the modern American historian Cathal Nolan echoed Knoop's assessment, stating:

The main reasons for his successes were Britain’s rising military power, critical Dutch and English finance, very fine Dutch and British troops, many able subordinates, and an equally talented co-commander in Prince Eugene of Savoy.

Marlborough was ruthlessly ambitious, and relentless in the pursuit of wealth, power, and social advancement, earning him a reputation for avarice and miserliness. These traits may have been exaggerated for party faction but, notes Trevelyan, nearly all other statesmen of the day were engaged in founding families and amassing estates at the public expense; Marlborough only differed in that he gave the public much more value for their money. In his quest for fame and personal interests he could be unscrupulous, as his desertion of James II testifies. To Macaulay this is regarded as a piece of selfish treachery against his patron; an analysis shared by G. K. Chesterton, a devout Catholic:

Churchill, as if to add something ideal to his imitation of Iscariot, went to James with wanton professions of love and loyalty ... and then calmly handed over the army to the invader. To the finish of this work of art but few could aspire, but to their degree, all the politicians of the Revolution were upon this ethical pattern.

To Trevelyan, Marlborough's behaviour during the 1688 revolution was a sign of his "devotion to the liberties of England and the Protestant religion". However, his continuing correspondence with Saint-Germain was not noble. Although Marlborough did not wish for a Jacobite restoration his double-dealing ensured that William III and George I would never be fully disposed to trust him.

Marlborough's weakness during Anne's reign lay in the English political scene. His determination to preserve the independence of the Queen's administration from the control of the party faction initially enjoyed full support, but once royal favour turned elsewhere, the Duke, like his key ally Godolphin, found himself isolated; first becoming little more than a servant of the Whigs, then a victim of the Tories.

=== Captain-General ===
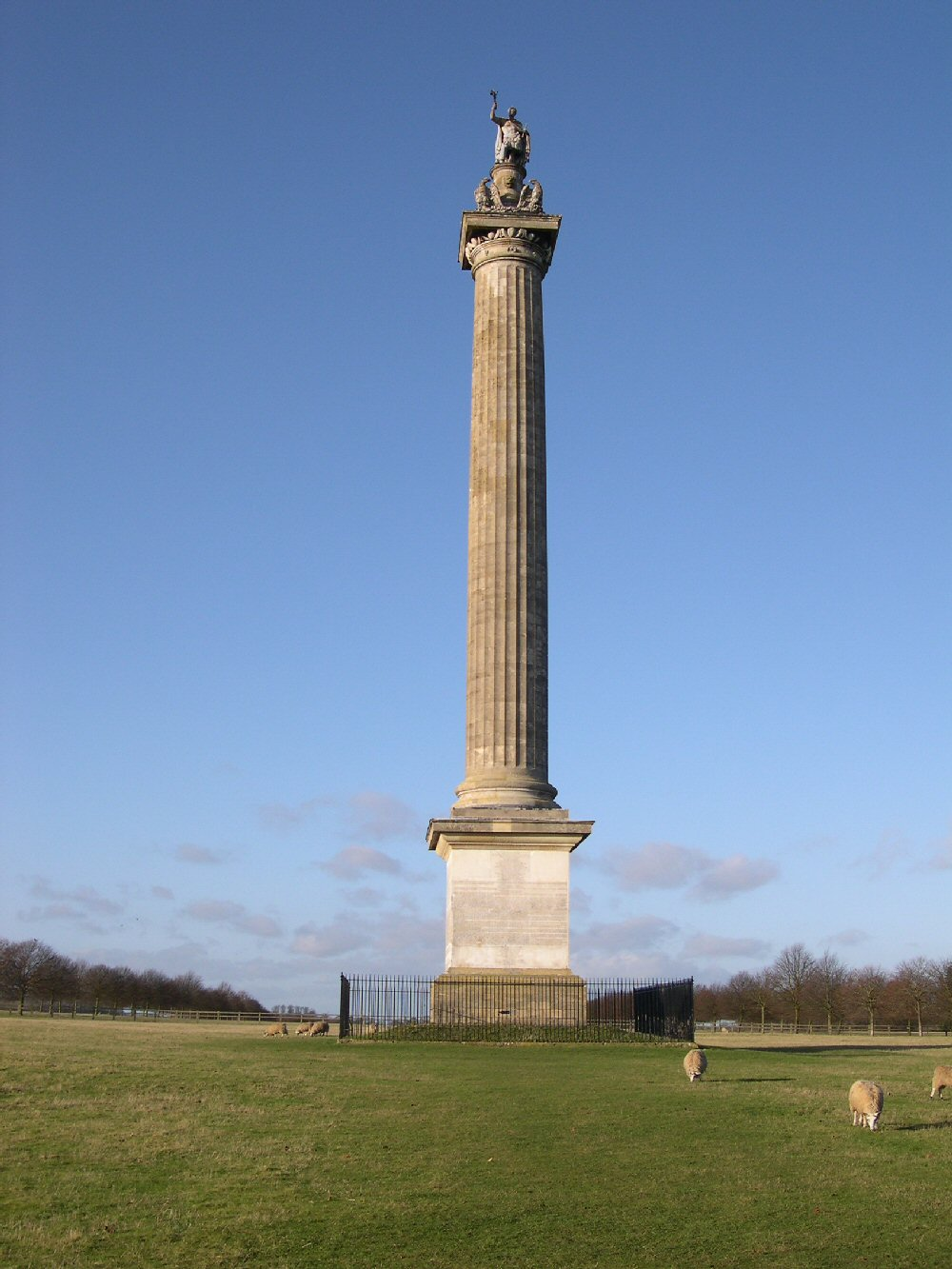
Blenheim Column of Victory on the grounds of the Blenheim estate, Oxfordshire

On the grand strategic level, Marlborough had a rare grasp of the broad issues involved and was able from the start of the War of the Spanish Succession to see the conflict in its entirety. He was one of the few influences working towards genuine unity within the Grand Alliance, but the extension of the war aims to include the replacement of Philip V as King of Spain was a fatal mistake. Marlborough stands accused – possibly for political and diplomatic reasons – of not pressing his private doubts about reinforcing failure. Spain proved a continuous drain of men and resources and ultimately hampered his chances of complete success in Flanders, the war's main theatre. The Allies did come close to a complete victory on several occasions, but the increasingly severe conditions imposed upon Louis XIV forestalled an early end to hostilities. Although the Duke lost his political influence in the latter stages of the war he still possessed vast prestige abroad, yet his failure to communicate his innermost convictions to his allies or political masters means he must bear some responsibility for the continuance of the war beyond its logical conclusion.

As a commander, Marlborough preferred battle over slow-moving siege warfare. Aided by an expert staff (particularly his carefully selected aides-de-camp such as Cadogan), as well as enjoying a close personal relationship with Eugene of Savoy, Marlborough proved far-sighted, often far ahead of his contemporaries in his conceptions, and was a master at assessing his enemy's characteristics in battle. Marlborough was more likely to manoeuvre than his opponents and was better at maintaining operational tempo at critical times, yet he qualified more as a great practitioner within the constraints of early 18th-century warfare, rather than as a great innovator who radically redefined military theory. Nevertheless, his predilection for fire, movement, and coordinated combined arms attacks, lay at the root of his great battlefield successes.

Marlborough was also a good administrator and his attention to detail meant that his troops rarely went short of supply. When his armies arrived at their destination they were intact and in a fit state to fight. This was accomplished mostly due to Marlborough's fruitful cooperation with Dutch officials and commanders, who made use of the Dutch Republic's efficient supply lines on campaign. Marlborough's concern for the welfare of the common soldier together with his ability to inspire trust and confidence, and his willingness to share the dangers of battle, often earned him adulation from his men – "The known world could not produce a man of more humanity", observed Corporal Matthew Bishop. It was this range of abilities that make Marlborough outstanding. Even his old adversaries recognised the Duke's qualities. In his Letters on the Study of History (1752), Bolingbroke declared, "I take with pleasure this opportunity of doing justice to that great man ... [whose memory] as the greatest general, and as the greatest minister that our country, or perhaps any other has produced, I honour". His success was made possible because of his enormous reserves of stamina, willpower and self-discipline; his ability to hold together the Alliance against France, made possible by his victories, can hardly be overestimated.

== Arms ==
Coat of arms of John Churchill, 1st Duke of Marlborough
Notes The arms of the 1st Duke of Marlborough must not be confused with those of the 5th Duke and his successors, which also incorporate the Spencer arms. The heraldic achievement shown here also represents the 1st Duke's lands in Mindelheim. Crest A lion couchant guardant argent, supporting with its dexter forepaw a banner azure, charged with a dexter hand appaumée of the first, staff Or. Torse Argent and sable Helm Ducal coronet Escutcheon Sable a lion rampant argent on a canton of the last a cross gules. Supporters Two wyverns wings elevated gules, (Note: Debrett's Peerage, 1968, p. 747, apparently contradicts Robson who states the wyverns are argent rather than gules.) collared and chained sable, each collar charged with three escallops argent. These are derived from the arms of the Duke's mother's family, Drake of Ash (Argent, a wyvern gules. These arms can be seen on the monument in Musbury Church to Sir Bernard Drake, d.1586). Motto Fiel pero desdichado (Spanish for: "Faithful but unfortunate") Orders Knight Companion of the Most Noble Order of the Garter

== Sources ==
- Anisimov, Evgeniĭ Viktorovich (1993). The reforms of Peter the Great. Progress through coercion in Russia. The New Russian history. M.E. Sharpe. ISBN 1-56324-047-5.
- Barnett, Correlli (1999). Marlborough. Wordsworth Editions. ISBN 1-84022-200-X.
- Blok, P.J.; Molhuysen, P.C. (1911). "Heinsius, Antonie". Nieuw Nederlandsch biografisch woordenboek. Deel 1.
- Chandler, David (1973). Marlborough as Military Commander (1989 ed.). Spellmount Publishers Ltd. ISBN 978-0-946771-12-7.
- —— (1998). A Guide to the Battlefields of Europe. Wordsworth Editions. ISBN 1-85326-694-9.
- Chesterton, G.K. (2008) [1st pub. 1917]. A Short History of England. BiblioBazaar. ISBN 0-554-10672-8.
- Childs, John (2014). General Percy Kirke and the Later Stuart Army. Bloomsbury Academic. ISBN 978-1-4742-5514-1.
- Churchill, Winston (2002a). A History of the English-Speaking Peoples: Age of Revolution. Weidenfeld & Nicolson. ISBN 0-304-36393-6.
- —— (2002b). Marlborough: His Life and Times, Bk. 1, vols. i & ii. University of Chicago Press. ISBN 0-226-10633-0.
- —— (2002c). Marlborough: His Life and Times, Bk. 2, vols. iii & iv. University of Chicago Press. ISBN 0-226-10635-7.
- Coxe, William (1847). Memoirs of the Duke of Marlborough. London. 6 volumes.
- Courtenay, Paul. "The Armorial Bearings of Sir Winston Churchill". Archived from the original on 18 July 2013.
- Cruickshanks, E; Hayton, DW, eds. (2002). The History of Parliament: the House of Commons 1690–1715; Churchill, George (1654–1710), of Windsor Little Park. Cambridge University Press. ISBN 978-0-521-77221-1.
- De Graaf, Ronald (2021). Friso: het tragische leven van Johan Willem Friso [Friso: the tragic life of John William Friso] (in Dutch). Boom. ISBN 978-90-2443-676-7.
- Duffy, Christopher (1987). The Military Experience in the Age of Reason. Wordsworth Military Library. ISBN 0-7102-1024-8.
- Field, Ophelia (2003). Sarah Churchill Duchess of Marlborough: The Queen's Favourite. St Martins. ISBN 978-0-312-31466-8.
- Gregg, Edward (1980). Queen Anne (2001 ed.). Routledge & Kegan Paul. ISBN 978-0-7100-0400-0.
- Hamilton, Elizabeth (1968). The Backstairs Dragon: The Life of Robert Harley, Earl of Oxford. Hamish Hamilton.
- Harris, Tim (2006). Revolution: The Great Crisis of the British Monarchy, 1685–1720. Penguin Books. ISBN 978-0-7139-9759-0.
- Hattendorf, John B. (May 2014). "Churchill, John, first duke of Marlborough (1650–1722)". Oxford Dictionary of National Biography (online ed.). Oxford University Press. doi:10.1093/ref:odnb/5401. (Subscription, Wikipedia Library access or UK public library membership required.)
- Hibbert, Christopher (2001). The Marlboroughs. Penguin. ISBN 0-670-88677-7.
- Holmes, Richard (2008). Marlborough: England's Fragile Genius. Harper Press. ISBN 978-0-00-722571-2.
- Ingrao, Charles (2000). The Habsburg Monarchy. Cambridge University Press. ISBN 978-0-521-78505-1.
- Jones, J.R. (1993). Marlborough. Cambridge University Press. ISBN 0-521-37593-2.
- Kenyon, J.P. (1963). The Nobility in the Revolution of 1688. University of Hull.
- Knoop, Willem Jan (1861). Krijgs – en geschiedkundige geschriften. Deel 1 [Military and historical writings. Volume 1] (in Dutch). H. A. M. Roelants.
- Lavalle, John H. (2004). "Marlborough, John Churchill, 1st Duke of". In James C. Bradford (ed.). International Encyclopedia of Military History. Vol. 2. Routledge. ISBN 978-1-135-95033-0.
- Lesaffer, Randall (n.d.). "The Wars of Louis XIV in Treaties (Part V): The Peace of Nijmegen (1678–1679)". Oxford Public International Law.
- Lynn, John A. (1999). The Wars of Louis XIV, 1667–1714. Longman. ISBN 0-582-05629-2.
- Macaulay, Thomas (1968). The History of England (abridged). Penguin. ISBN 0-14-043133-0.
- McKay, Derek (1977). Prince Eugene of Savoy. Thames and Hudson. ISBN 0-500-87007-1.
- McKay, Derek; Scott, H.M. (1983). The Rise of the Great Powers. Addison-Wesley Longman. ISBN 978-0-582-48553-2.
- Miller, John (2000). James II. Yale University Press. ISBN 0-300-08728-4.
- Nimwegen, Olaf van (1995). De subsistentie van het leger: Logistiek en strategie van het Geallieerde en met name het Staatse leger tijdens de Spaanse Successieoorlog in de Nederlanden en het Heilige Roomse Rijk (1701-1712) [The Subsistence of the Army: Logistics and Strategy of the Allied, Particularly the Dutch, Army during the War of the Spanish Succession in the Netherlands and the Holy Roman Empire (1701-1712)]. Bataafsche Leeuw.
- Nimwegen, Olaf van (2020). De Veertigjarige Oorlog 1672–1712: de strijd van de Nederlanders tegen de Zonnekoning [The 40 Years' War 1672–1712: the Dutch struggle against the Sun King] (in Dutch). Prometheus. ISBN 978-90-446-3871-4.
- Nolan, Cathal J. (2017). The Allure of Battle. Oxford University Press. ISBN 978-0195383782.
- Norrhem, Svante (2010). Christina och Carl Piper: en biografi [Christina and Carl Piper: a biography] (in Swedish). Lund: Historiska media. ISBN 978-91-86297-11-4.
- Parker, Robert (1747). Memoirs of the most remarkable military transactions from the year 1683 to 1718. Containing a more particular account than any yet published of the several battles, sieges, etc. ... By Captain R. Parker ... Published by his son. S. Austen.
- Schreurs, Eugeen (2013). "Church music and minstrel musc". Music and the City: Musical Cultures and Urban Societies in the Southern Netherlands and Beyond, c. 1650–1800. Leuven University Press. ISBN 978-90-5867-955-0.
- Somerset, Anne (2013). Queen Anne: The Politics of Passion. Knopf Publishing. ISBN 978-0-307-96288-1.
- Storrs, Christopher (2006). The Resilience of the Spanish Monarchy 1665–1700. Oxford University Press. ISBN 0-19-924637-8.
- Thompson, Andrew (2013). "The Grand Alliances". Ego | Europäische Geschichte Online. Mainz: European History Online, Institute of European History.
- Tincey, John (2005). Sedgemoor 1685: Marlborough's First Victory. Leo Cooper. ISBN 978-1-84415-147-9.
- Trevelyan, G.M. (1930–1934). England Under Queen Anne. Longmans, Green and Co. 3 volumes.
- Vivian, Lt.Col. J.L., ed. (1895). The Visitations of the County of Devon: Comprising the Heralds' Visitations of 1531, 1564 & 1620. Exeter: For the author, by H. S. Eland;
- Wijn, J.W. (1956). Het Staatsche Leger: Deel VIII Het tijdperk van de Spaanse Successieoorlog (The Dutch States Army: Part VIII The era of the War of the Spanish Succession) (in Dutch). Martinus Nijhoff.

Parliament of the United Kingdom
Preceded by Sir John Barrington	Member of Parliament for Newtown; 1679; With: John Holmes	Succeeded by Lemuel Kingdon
Court offices
Preceded by -	Gentleman of the Bedchamber; 1673 – 1692	Succeeded by -
Political offices
Preceded by The Earl of Carlisle	Chief Minister of Great Britain; 1702–1710	Succeeded by The Earl Poulett
Diplomatic posts
Preceded by Richard Graham, 1st Viscount Preston	English Ambassador to France; 1685	Succeeded by Sir William Trumbull
Military offices
New regiment	Colonel of The King's Own Royal Regiment of Dragoons; 1683–1685	Succeeded by Viscount Cornbury
Preceded by The Earl of Feversham	Captain and Colonel of the 3rd Troop of Horse Guards; 1685–1688	Succeeded by The Duke of Berwick
Preceded by The Duke of Berwick	Captain and Colonel of the 3rd Troop of Horse Guards; 1689–1692	Succeeded by Viscount Colchester
Preceded by The Lord Dartmouth	Colonel of the Ordnance Regiment; 1689–1692	Succeeded by Hon. George Douglas-Hamilton
Vacant Title last held by The Duke of Monmouth	Commander-in-Chief of the Forces; 1690–1691	Succeeded by The Duke of Leinster
Preceded by William Seymour	Colonel of The Duke of Marlborough's Regiment of Foot; 1702–1704	Succeeded by William Tatton
New title	Captain-General of the British Army; 1702–1711	Succeeded by The Duke of Ormonde
Vacant Title last held by The Duke of Leinster	Commander-in-Chief of the Forces; 1702–1708	Vacant Title next held by The Duke of Ormonde
Preceded by The Earl of Romney	Master-General of the Ordnance; 1702–1712	Succeeded by The Earl Rivers
Preceded by The Earl of Romney	Colonel of the 1st Regiment of Foot Guards; 1704–1712	Succeeded by The Duke of Ormonde
Preceded by The Duke of Ormonde	Captain-General of the British Army; 1714–1717	Vacant Title next held by The Duke of Cumberland
Preceded by The Duke of Ormonde	Colonel of the 1st Regiment of Foot Guards; 1714–1722	Succeeded by The Earl Cadogan
Vacant Title last held by The Duke of Hamilton	Master-General of the Ordnance; 1714–1722	Succeeded by The Earl Cadogan
Honorary titles
Preceded by The Earl of Abingdon	Lord Lieutenant of Oxfordshire; 1706–1712	Succeeded by The Earl of Abingdon
Peerage of England
New title	Duke of Marlborough; 1702–1722	Succeeded by Henrietta Godolphin
New title	Earl of Marlborough; 1689–1722	Succeeded by Henrietta Godolphin
German nobility
Preceded by George III (until 1586) as Baron of Part of Bavaria	Sovereign Prince of Mindelheim; 1705–1714	Annexed by Bavaria
