= Ralph Rowlett =

16th-century English politician

Sir Ralph Rowlett (by 1513 – 20 April 1571), of Holywell House, St Albans, Hertfordshire, was an English politician.

He was the eldest son of Ralph Rowlett of London and St Albans by his first wife Jane Knight. He succeeded his merchant father in 1543 and was knighted by 1547.

He was a Member (MP) of the Parliament of England for Hertfordshire in 1547 and appointed High Sheriff of Essex and Hertfordshire for 1559–60.

He married firstly Dorothy Bowles, the daughter of John Bowles of Wallington, Hertfordshire, and secondly Margaret Cooke (d. 3 August 1558), daughter of Sir Anthony Cooke of Gidea Hall, Essex. He had no issue by either of his marriages. He left a life interest in Holywell to Chief Justice Sir Robert Catlyn.
