= George Villiers, 4th Earl of Jersey =

British courtier and politician (1735–1805)

The Right Honourable The Earl of Jersey PC FSA
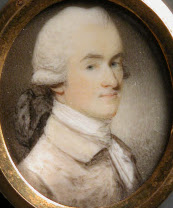
- George Villiers, 4th Earl of Jersey

Member of Parliament for Dover
- In office 1768–1769 Serving with Sir Joseph Yorke
- Preceded by: Sir Joseph Yorke; John Bindley
- Succeeded by: Sir Joseph Yorke; Sir Thomas Pym Hales

Member of Parliament for Aldborough
- In office 1765–1768 Serving with Nathaniel Cholmley
- Preceded by: Andrew Wilkinson; Nathaniel Cholmley
- Succeeded by: Andrew Wilkinson; Hon. Aubrey Beauclerk

Member of Parliament for Tamworth
- In office 1756–1765 Serving with Sir Robert Burdett, Bt
- Preceded by: Thomas Villiers; Sir Robert Burdett, Bt
- Succeeded by: Sir Robert Burdett, Bt; Edward Thurlow

Personal details
- Born: George Bussy Villiers; 9 June 1735
- Died: 22 August 1805 (aged 70) Tunbridge Wells, England
- Spouse: Frances Twysden (m. 1770)
- Children: 10 including: George Child Villiers, 5th Earl of Jersey; Caroline Campbell, Duchess of Argyll
- Parent(s): William Villiers, 3rd Earl of Jersey; Lady Anne Egerton
- Relatives: Villiers family

George Bussy Villiers, 4th Earl of Jersey, PC, FSA (9 June 1735 – 22 August 1805), styled Viscount Villiers from 1742 to 1769, was a British politician and courtier.

== Early life ==
He was the oldest surviving son of William Villiers, 3rd Earl of Jersey, and the former Anne Russell, Duchess of Bedford. Born Lady Anne Egerton, his mother was the widow of Wriothesley Russell, 3rd Duke of Bedford, who died in 1732 at age 24. She married William Villiers in 1733. His elder brother, Frederick William Villiers, died in childhood in 1742, at which time he was styled Viscount Villiers.

His paternal grandparents were William Villiers, 2nd Earl of Jersey, and the former Judith Herne (a daughter of Frederick Herne). His maternal grandparents were Scroop Egerton, 1st Duke of Bridgewater, and Lady Elizabeth Churchill (herself the daughter of John Churchill, 1st Duke of Marlborough, and Sarah, Duchess of Marlborough).

== Career ==
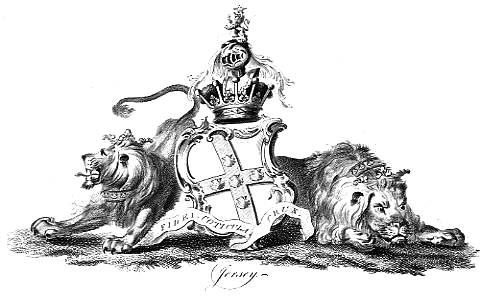
Arms of the 4th Earl of Jersey in 1790

Between 1756 and his father's death in 1769, which took him into the House of Lords, he served continuously in the House of Commons as MP for, in turn, Tamworth in Staffordshire, Aldborough in the West Riding of Yorkshire, and Dover in Kent. He followed the political lead of the Duke of Grafton in both the Commons and Lords. He was a Lord of the Admiralty from 1761 to 1763 and was sworn of the Privy Council on 11 July 1765 and served as Vice-Chamberlain from 1765 to 1769.

On his elevation to the peerage in 1769, he was made a Gentleman of the Bedchamber to George III from 1769 to 1777, and served as Master of the Buckhounds from 1782 to 1783, and in other court posts until 1800. Because of his courtly manners he was known as the "Prince of Maccaronies."

He was elected a Fellow of the Society of Antiquaries in 1787.

== Personal life ==
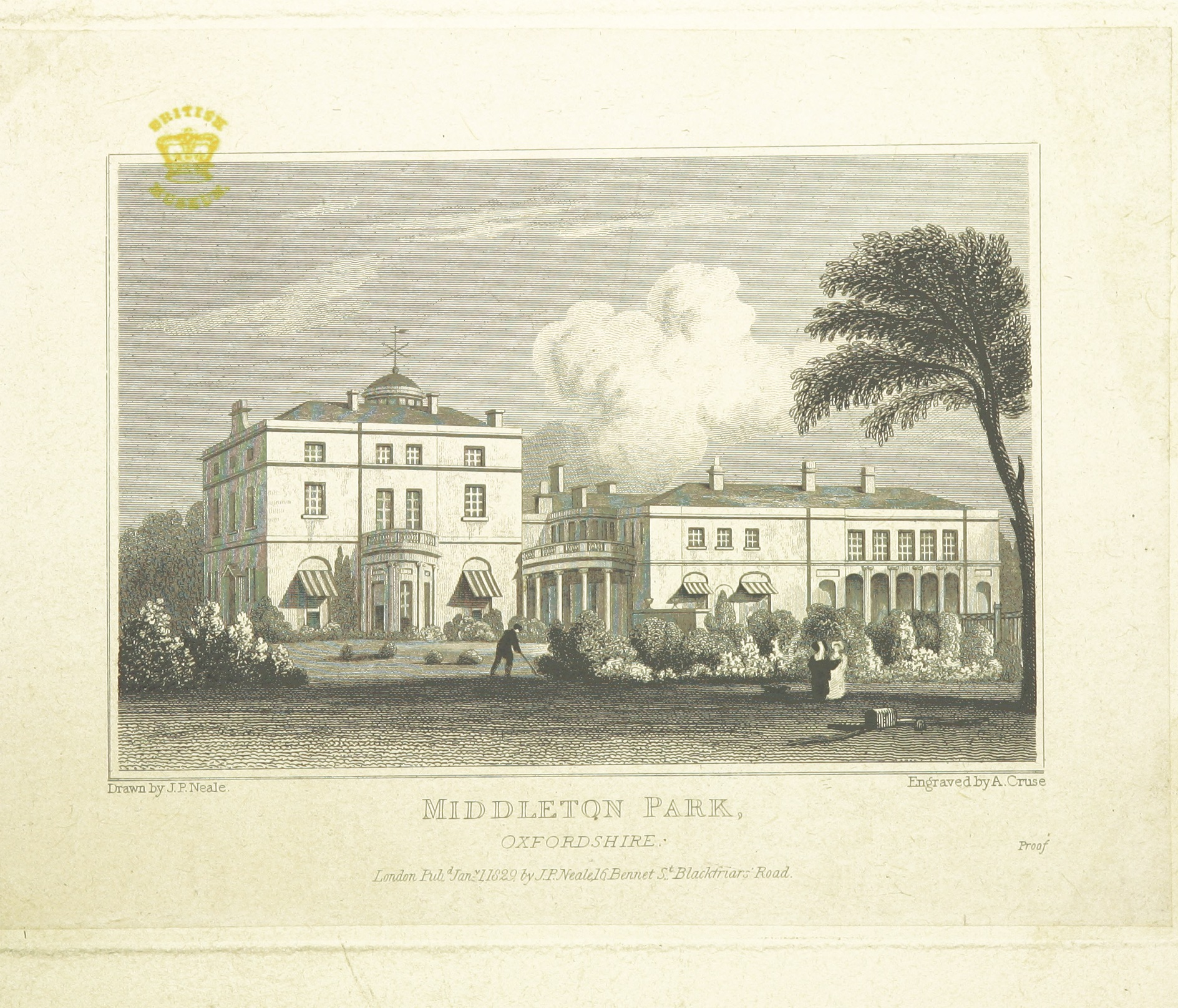
Middleton Park, Oxfordshire - seat of the Earls of Jersey, c. 1830

Lord Jersey married Frances Twysden at her stepfather's house in the parish of St Martin-in-the-Fields on 26 March 1770. Lady Jersey, who was seventeen years younger than her husband, became one of the more notorious mistresses of George IV in 1793, when he was still Prince of Wales. She was 40 years old at the time and more than once a grandmother. Together, Lord and Lady Jersey had ten children:

- Lady Charlotte Anne Villiers (1771–1808), who married Lord William Russell, the posthumous son of Francis Russell, Marquess of Tavistock (eldest son of the 4th Duke of Bedford), in 1789. The 4th Duke was the younger brother of the 4th Earl's mother's first husband, Wriothesley. Lord William was the younger brother of the 5th and 6th Dukes of Bedford, and uncle of the 7th Duke of Bedford.
- Lady Anne Barbara Frances Villiers (1772–1832), who married William Henry Lambton, MP for Durham, who was a son of Maj.-Gen. John Lambton, in 1791. After his death in 1797, she married Hon. Charles William Wyndham, a son of Charles, 2nd Earl of Egremont.
- George Child Villiers, 5th Earl of Jersey (1773–1859), who married Sarah Sophia Fane, a daughter of John Fane, 10th Earl of Westmorland, and Sarah Anne Child (only child of Robert Child, the principal shareholder in the banking firm Child & Co.).
- Lady Caroline Elizabeth Villiers (1774–1835), who married Henry Paget, 1st Marquess of Anglesey, eldest son of Henry Bayley-Paget, 1st Earl of Uxbridge and Jane Champagné (a daughter of the Very Rev. Arthur Champagné, Dean of Clonmacnoise). After their divorce in the Scottish courts in 1809, she married secondly George Campbell, 6th Duke of Argyll, the eldest son of John Campbell, 5th Duke of Argyll, and his wife, Elizabeth Campbell, 1st Baroness Hamilton.
- Lady Georgiana Villiers (1776–1776), who died in infancy.
- Lady Sarah Villiers (1779–1852), who married Charles Nathaniel Bayley in 1799.
- Hon. William Augustus Henry Villiers (1780–1813), who died unmarried in America, having assumed the surname of Mansel in 1802, pursuant to the will of Louisa Barbara, Baroness Vernon.
- Lady Catherine Villiers (1782–1810), who died unmarried.
- Lady Frances Elizabeth Villiers (1786–1866), who married John Ponsonby, 1st Viscount Ponsonby, the eldest son of William Ponsonby, 1st Baron Ponsonby, and Louisa Molesworth, in 1803.
- Lady Harriet Villiers (1788–1870), who married Richard Bagot, Bishop of Oxford, a younger son of William Bagot, 1st Baron Bagot, and Hon. Elizabeth Louisa St John (a daughter of the 2nd Viscount St John), in 1806.

Lord Jersey died on 22 August 1805 at Tunbridge Wells.

=== Descendants ===
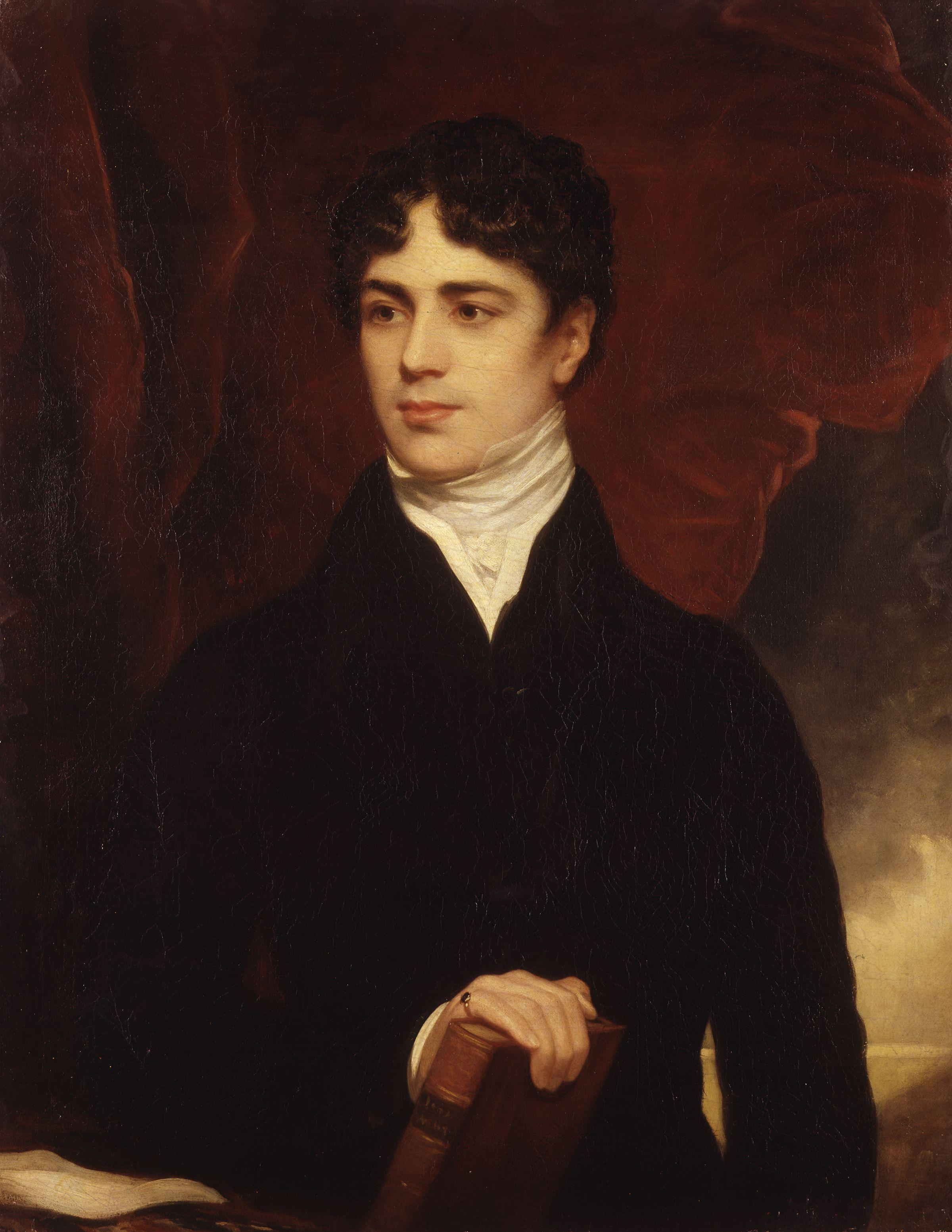
Portrait of his grandson, John Lambton, 1st Earl of Durham, by Thomas Phillips, 1820

Through his daughter Anne, he was a grandfather of John Lambton, 1st Earl of Durham, who married Harriet Cholmondeley, the illegitimate daughter of the 4th Earl of Cholmondeley. After her death in July 1815, he married Lady Louisa Grey, daughter of the 2nd Earl Grey.

Through his daughter Caroline, he is an ancestor of Diana, Princess of Wales, and of her sons, William, Prince of Wales and Prince Harry, Duke of Sussex.

== Ancestry ==
Ancestors of George Villiers, 4th Earl of Jersey

8. Edward Villiers, 1st Earl of Jersey (1656–1711)
4. William Villiers, 2nd Earl of Jersey (1682–1721)
9. Barbara Chiffinch (1663–1735)
2. William Villiers, 3rd Earl of Jersey (1707–1769)
10. Frederick Herne (1667–1714)
5. Judith Herne (1686–1735)
11. Elizabeth Lisle (m. lic. 1688)
1. George Villiers, 4th Earl of Jersey
12. John Egerton, 3rd Earl of Bridgewater (1646–1701)
6. Scroop Egerton, 1st Duke of Bridgewater (1681–1744)
13. Lady Jane Paulet (1656–1716)
3. Lady Anne Egerton (1705–1762)
14. John Churchill, 1st Duke of Marlborough (1650–1722)
7. Lady Elizabeth Churchill
15. Sarah Jennings (1660–1744)

Political offices
Preceded by Lord William Finch	Vice-Chamberlain of the Household; 1765–1769	Succeeded by Hon. Thomas Robinson
Preceded by The Viscount Bateman	Master of the Buckhounds; 1782–1783	Succeeded by Viscount Hinchingbrooke
Preceded by Lord Townshend	Captain of the Gentlemen Pensioners; 1783	Succeeded by Lord Townshend
Parliament of Great Britain
Preceded by Thomas Villiers; Sir Robert Burdett, Bt	Member of Parliament for Tamworth; 1756–1765; With: Sir Robert Burdett, Bt	Succeeded by Sir Robert Burdett, Bt; Edward Thurlow
Preceded by Andrew Wilkinson; Nathaniel Cholmley	Member of Parliament for Aldborough; 1765–1768; With: Nathaniel Cholmley	Succeeded by Andrew Wilkinson; Hon. Aubrey Beauclerk
Preceded by Sir Joseph Yorke; John Bindley	Member of Parliament for Dover; 1768–1769; With: Sir Joseph Yorke	Succeeded by Sir Joseph Yorke; Sir Thomas Pym Hales
Peerage of England
Preceded by William Villiers	Earl of Jersey; 1769–1805	Succeeded by George Child Villiers
