= Anne Russell, Duchess of Bedford =

English peer (1705-1762)

Her Grace The Duchess of Bedford
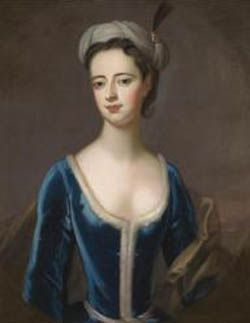
- Portrait of Lady Anne Egerton by Enoch Seeman
- Born: c. 1705
- Died: 16 June 1762
- Spouses: Wriothesley Russell, 3rd Duke of Bedford (m. 1725; died 1732) William Villiers, 3rd Earl of Jersey (m. 1733)
- Issue: Frederick Villiers, Viscount Villiers; George Villiers, 4th Earl of Jersey
- Parents: Scroop Egerton, 1st Duke of Bridgewater; Lady Elizabeth Churchill

Anne Russell, Duchess of Bedford (née Egerton; c. 1705 – 16 June 1762) was the wife of Wriothesley Russell, 3rd Duke of Bedford, and, following his death, of William Villiers, 3rd Earl of Jersey. She was the mother of the 4th Earl of Jersey.

== Early life ==
Anne was the daughter of Scroop Egerton, 1st Duke of Bridgewater, by his first wife, the former Lady Elizabeth Churchill (herself the daughter of John Churchill, 1st Duke of Marlborough, and Sarah, Duchess of Marlborough). Anne's brother, John Egerton, Viscount Brackley, died at the age of 14. Following her mother's death in 1714, her father remarried to Lady Rachel Russell, daughter of Wriothesley Russell, 2nd Duke of Bedford; Lady Rachel was about twenty years younger than her husband, and this second marriage produced seven children, who were Anne's half-siblings. They included John Egerton, 2nd Duke of Bridgewater, and Francis Egerton, 3rd Duke of Bridgewater.

== Personal life ==
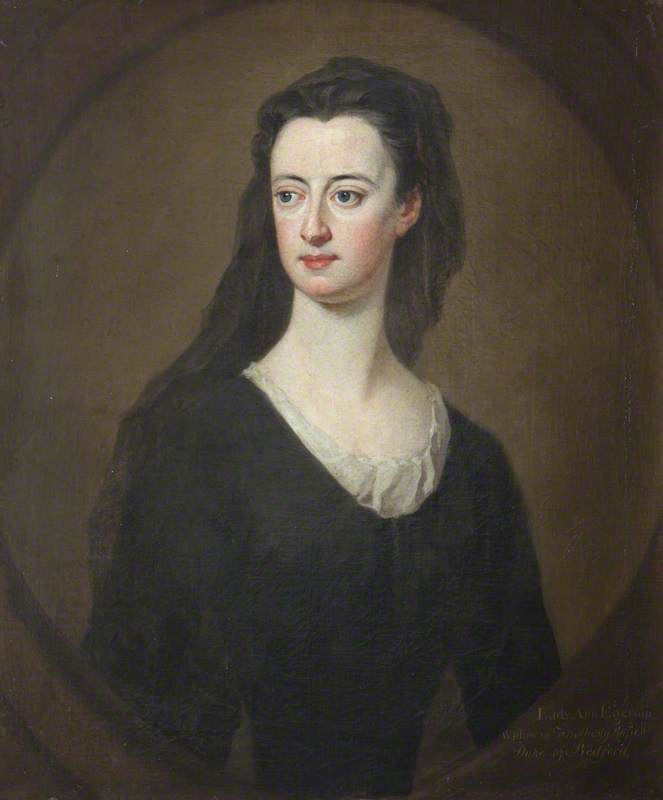
Portrait of the duchess attributed to Godfrey Kneller

On 22 April 1725, at Ashbridge, Buckinghamshire, Anne married her stepmother's brother, who had succeeded to the dukedom in 1711. A contemporary wrote that: "There resulted an wholly mix-up of relationships". The marriage was not a success, and the couple were childless. The duke was in financial difficulty, and died on 23 October 1732, aged 24, in Corunna, Spain, and Anne became Dowager Duchess, as the dukedom passed to her husband's brother.

=== Second marriage ===
On 23 June 1733, Anne married William Villiers, 3rd Earl of Jersey, at St. James's, Westminster. He was the son of William Villiers, 2nd Earl of Jersey and the former Judith Herne (a daughter of Frederick Herne). Together, the couple had two sons:

- Frederick William Villiers, Viscount Villiers (1734–1742), who died in childhood.
- George Bussy Villiers, 4th Earl of Jersey (1735–1805), who married Frances Twysden and had children. Through George, they are ancestors of Diana, Princess of Wales, and of her sons, Princes William, the Prince of Wales, and Harry, Duke of Sussex.

Lady Jersey died on 16 June 1762 and her husband, Lord Jersey, died seven years later on 28 August 1769.

=== Philanthropic endeavours ===
On 7 January 1730 she was the sixth signatory to the Ladies' Petition for the Establishment of the Foundling Hospital, a philanthropic effort organised by Thomas Coram for the protection of infants who would otherwise be a risk of being abandoned.
