= Bridgewater House, Westminster =

Townhouse in London, England, rebuilt 1854

Bridgewater House
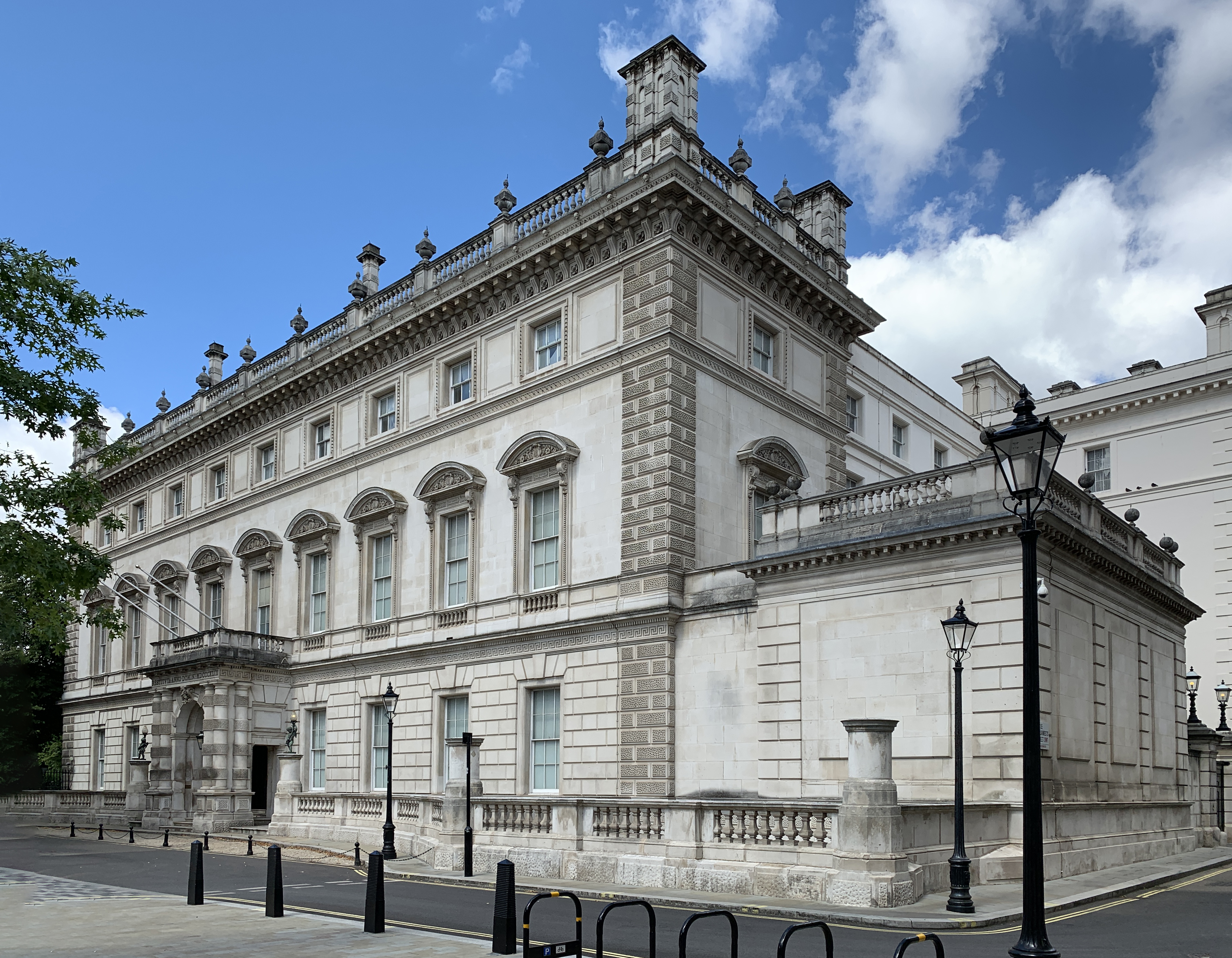
- Bridgewater House in 2020

- Location within Central London
- 51°30′17″N 0°08′24″W
- Type: Townhouse
- Location: 14 Cleveland Row; London, England
- OS grid reference: TQ 29203 80070

History
- Built: 1854

Site notes
- Architect: Charles Barry
- Architectural style: Palazzo style
- Owner: Latsis family

Listed Building – Grade I
- Official name: Bridgewater House
- Designated: 24 February 1958
- Reference no.: 1066255

Bridgewater House is a townhouse located at 14 Cleveland Row in the St James's area of London, England. Designed by Sir Charles Barry, it is a Grade I listed building.

== History and owners ==
=== Berkshire House ===
The earliest known house on the site was Berkshire House, built in about 1626–27 for Thomas Howard, second son of the Earl of Suffolk and Master of the Horse to Charles I of England when he was Prince of Wales. Howard was later created Earl of Berkshire.

=== Cleveland House ===
After being occupied by Parliamentarian troops in the English Civil War, used for the Portuguese Embassy, and inhabited by Edward Hyde, 1st Earl of Clarendon, the house was lived in by Charles II's mistress Barbara Villiers, who was made Duchess of Cleveland in 1670, following which the house was known as Cleveland House. She refaced the old house and added new wings.

=== Earls and Dukes of Bridgewater ===
After being owned for some years by a speculator, the house was sold in 1700 to John Egerton, 3rd Earl of Bridgewater.

The House remained with the Egerton family for the next century; after the death of the 3rd Earl of Bridgewater in 1701, it passed to his son and heir Scroop Egerton, 4th Earl of Bridgewater (1st Duke of Bridgewater after 1720), and then to Scroop's sons John Egerton, 2nd Duke of Bridgewater and Francis Egerton, 3rd Duke of Bridgewater.

=== Leveson-Gower and Egerton families ===
The Dukedom of Bridgewater became extinct after the death of the 3rd Duke of Bridgewater in 1803; the Duke bequeathed his estates to his nephew George Leveson-Gower, 2nd Marquess of Stafford, with a remainder to Lord Stafford's second son Lord Francis Leveson-Gower. During the period when Lord Stafford occupied the house he was granted the title Duke of Sutherland; he later purchased the leasehold of a neighbouring mansion York House (renamed Stafford House, later Lancaster House) in the late 1820s, which became the London residence of the senior male-line branch of the Leveson-Gower family until 1912.

Lord Francis inherited the House following his father's death in 1833, and in the same year he was elevated to the peerage as Earl of Ellesmere and changed his last name to Egerton. In 1840 Lord Ellesmere commissioned Sir Charles Barry to undertake a major re-design of Bridgewater House. The rebuilding was completed in 1854.

The Ellesmere family continued to maintain Bridgewater House as their London residence until 1948, when it was sold by John Egerton, 5th Earl of Ellesmere (who later succeeded a distant cousin as 6th Duke of Sutherland and 7th Marquess of Stafford in 1963) to the Legal & General Assurance Society. The 1948 sale price was reportedly in excess of £250,000. The building had sustained significant damage during the Second World War by a bomb in the street; the firm Robert Atkinson and Partners understood its restoration during 1948-49, and the building was subsequently adapted for office use.

=== Commercial use ===
The leasehold of the propety was advertised for sale in October 1961; contemporary reports by The Daily Telegraph noted that the British Oxygen Co. had then recently relinquished their sub-leasehold interest in Bridgwater House and neighbouring Spencer House. The leasehold interest had an unexpired term of 185 years, for a ground rent of £12,000 annually, and had been purchased from the British Oxygen Co. by Tube Investments; the freehold of the property at the time of the advertisement was reportedly held by The Legal & General Assurance Co.

In 1981, Bridgewater House was purchased for £19 million and restored by Yiannis Latsis, a Greek shipping magnate, and it is still owned by his family.

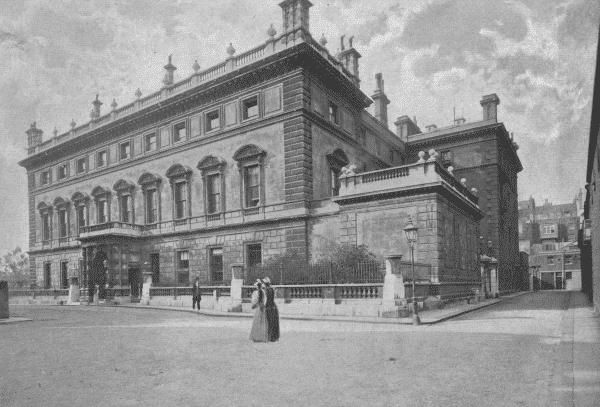
Bridgewater House in 1896 (front façade)

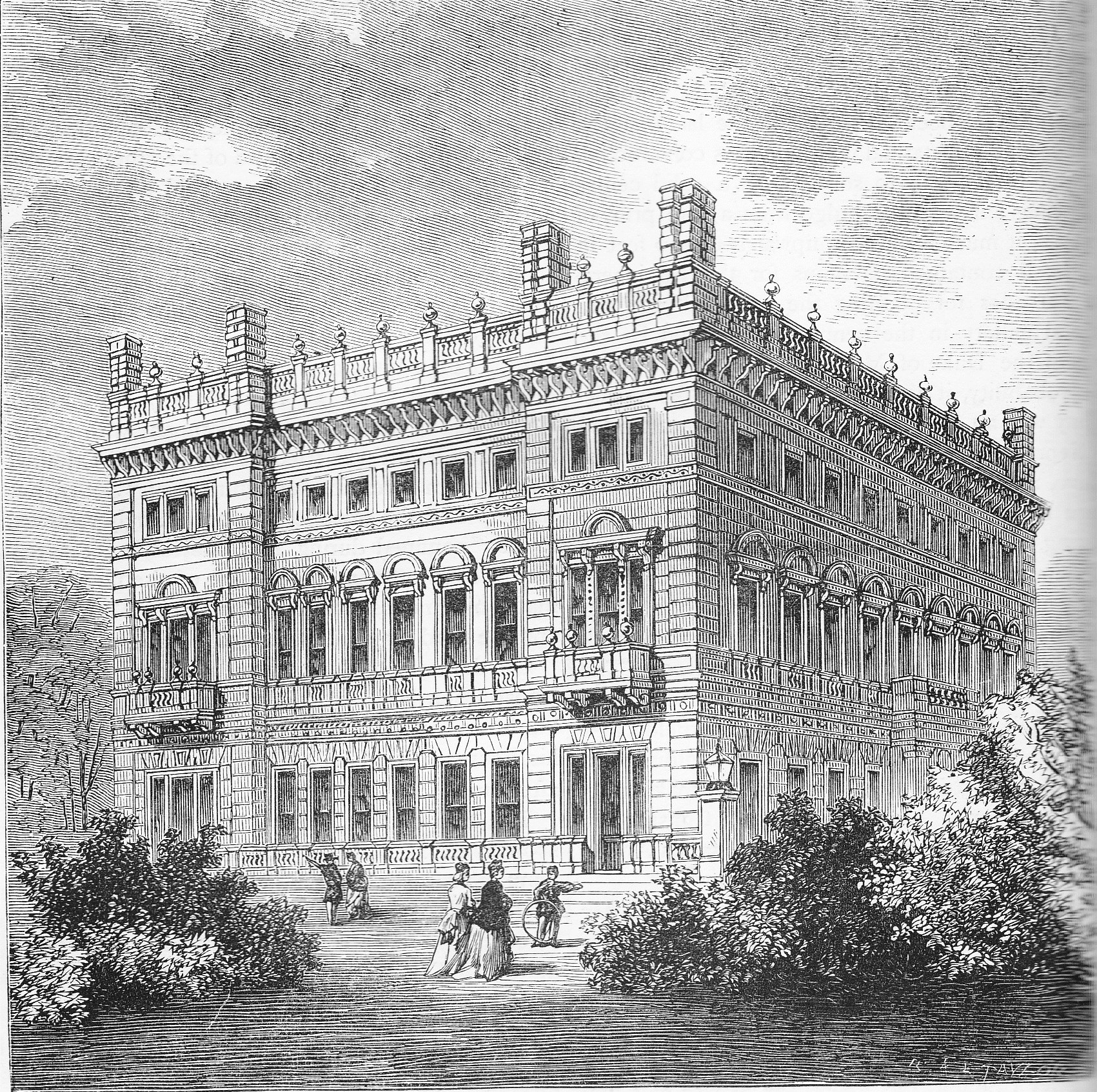
Bridgewater House in a 19th-century engraving

== Architecture ==
Barry designed Bridgewater House in a Palazzo style. It was built of Bath stone with a slate roof, and is of three storeys with a basement. The house is a Grade I listed building. The walls and terraces on the garden front facing Green Park have a separate Grade I listing.

== Art collections ==
George Leveson-Gower, 2nd Marquess of Stafford had Cleveland House extended in 1803–1806 by architect Charles Heathcote Tatham to accommodate the Stafford Gallery (renamed the Bridgewater Gallery in Bridgewater House), where the collections of paintings of the Duke of Bridgewater and his nephew and heir George Leveson-Gower, 1st Duke of Sutherland (whose second son Ellesmere was) were on at least semi-public display.

The collection included about 70 paintings from the famous Orleans Collection, some of which are now in the Sutherland Loan to the National Gallery of Scotland. The collection was opened in 1803, and it could be visited on Wednesday afternoons over four, later three, months in the summer by "acquaintances" of a member of the family, or artists recommended by a member of the Royal Academy.

The painting Charles I Insulted by Cromwell's Soldiers, thought lost in a World War II air raid, was rediscovered in 2009.

== In popular culture ==
The exterior appears as Marchmain House in the 1981 television adaptation of Brideshead Revisited and as Grantham House, the Crawleys' London house, in the television historical drama series Downton Abbey.

== Bibliography ==
- Stourton, James (2012). Great Houses of London (Hardback). London: Frances Lincoln. ISBN 978-0-7112-3366-9.
