= Andrew Wilkinson (British politician) =

British estate manager and Whig politician

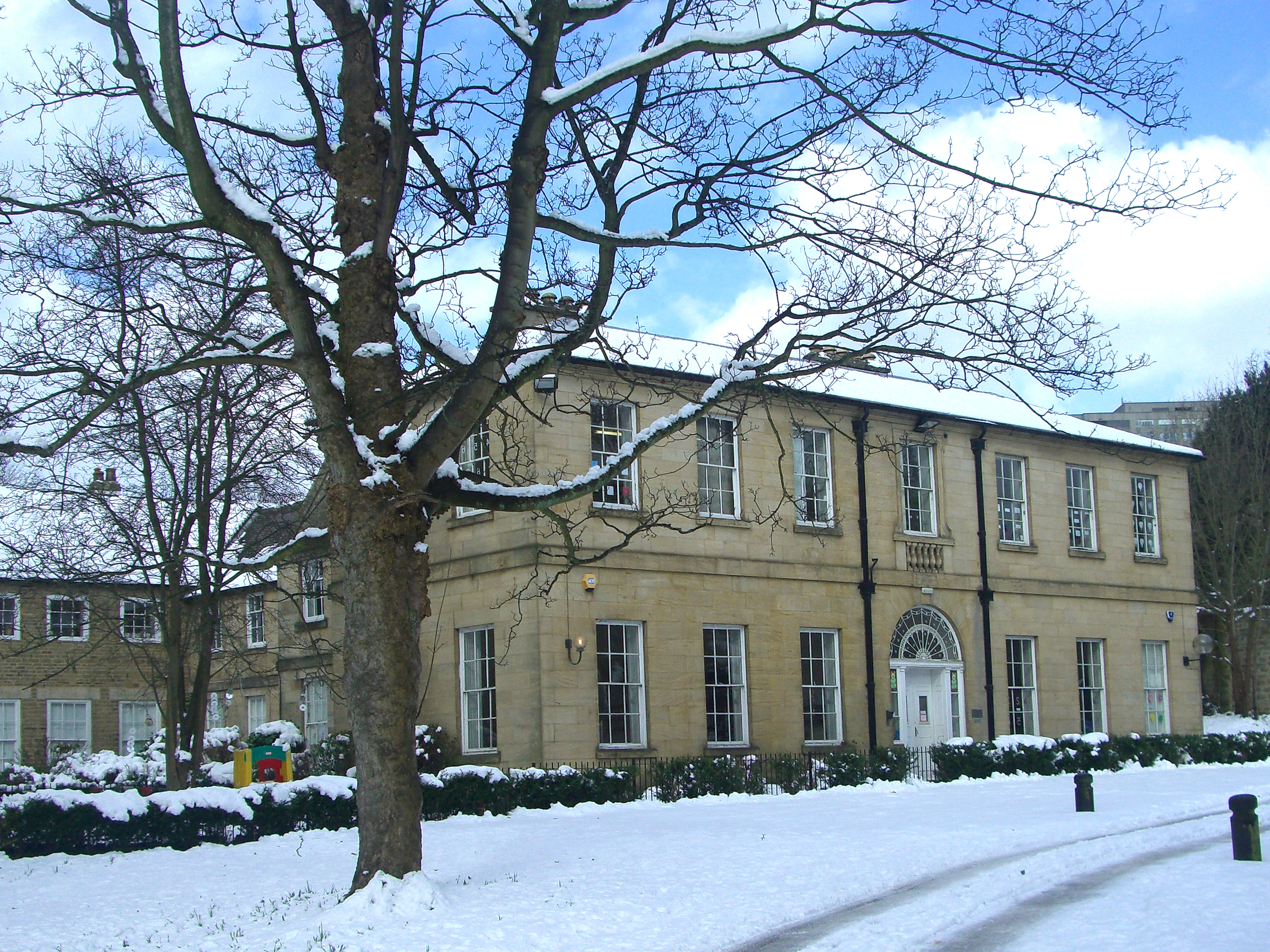
Broom Hall, Sheffield

Andrew Wilkinson (1697–1784), of Boroughbridge, Yorkshire, was a British estate manager and Whig politician who sat in the House of Commons for 35 years between 1735 and 1772.

Wilkinson was the son of Charles Wilkinson of Boroughbridge and his wife Deborah Cholmley, daughter of Richard Cholmley of Bramham, Yorkshire. He was admitted at Clare College, Cambridge on 2 July 1715 and at the Middle Temple on 8 July 1719. He married Barbara Jessop, daughter of William Jessop of Broom Hall near Sheffield on 2 September 1723.

Wilkinson's father was the Yorkshire estate agent of successive Dukes of Newcastle, and from 1718 was the receiver-general of the land tax for Yorkshire, Northumberland and Durham until he resigned in 1727. Wilkinson then became receiver of the land tax for West Rising. Shortly afterwards it was discovered that Wilkinson's father was in debt to the Government for over £30,000 and consequently spent the rest of his life as a crown debtor in Newgate prison. Wilkinson's own position as receiver was in jeopardy until his father-in-law Jessop offered to stand surety for him.

Wilkinson was invited to stand for parliament at Boroughbridge at the 1734 British general election, but the Duke of Newcastle advised him to wait until Aldborough became available. When his father-in-law William Jessop died in 1735, Wilkinson gave up his post as receiver and was returned as Member of Parliament for Aldborough at a by-election on 19 February 1735. He was returned unopposed as MP for Aldborough at the 1741 British general election and was awarded the post of Clerk of Deliveries in the Ordnance in May 1741. In 1746 he was promoted to Storekeeper of the Ordnance and was re-elected to parliament on the consequential parliament on 23 April 1746. He was returned unopposed again at the 1747 British general election.

Wilkinson continued to act as Newcastle's estate agent and electoral manager for Yorkshire and was returned unopposed again for Aldborough in 1754 and 1761. However, he voted against the Government on the peace preliminaries in December 1762 and as a result was dismissed from his post at the Ordnance. He was restored to the post in September 1765, but had to give up his parliamentary seat and was unable to recontest it because it was required for Viscount Villiers. Wilkinson applied to the Duke of Newcastle to be returned to Parliament again and was returned for Aldborough at the 1768 British general election. He was absent for many votes and resigned his seat in May 1772 by applying for the post of Steward of the Manor of East Hendred.

Wilkinson died on 29 March 1784, leaving seven sons. Broom Hall was left to his eldest son, Rev. James Wilkinson. His third son, also named Andrew, became a captain in the Royal Navy.

Parliament of Great Britain
Preceded by William Jessop; Henry Pelham	Member of Parliament for Aldborough; 1735–1765; With: John Jewkes 1735–43; Nathaniel Newnham 1743–54; William Pitt 1754–56; Nathaniel Cholmley 1756–65	Succeeded by Nathaniel Cholmley; Viscount Villiers
Preceded by Nathaniel Cholmley; Viscount Villiers	Member of Parliament for Aldborough; 1768–1772; With: Aubrey Beauclerk	Succeeded by Aubrey Beauclerk; Earl of Lincoln
Political offices
Preceded by William Rawlinson Earle	Clerk of Deliveries of the Ordnance; 1741–1746	Succeeded by Charles Frederick
Preceded by George Gregory	Storekeeper of the Ordnance; 1746–1762	Succeeded by Sir Edward Winnington, Bt
Preceded by Sir Edward Winnington, Bt	Storekeeper of the Ordnance; 1765–1778	Succeeded by Benjamin Langlois
