= Lords and Gentlemen of the Bedchamber =

List of assistants to the monarch

Gentleman of the Bedchamber was a title in the Royal Household, found in the Kingdom of Scotland from the 16th century and in the Kingdom of England from the early 17th century (having been introduced, in both places, by James VI and I); the title continued to be used in the Kingdom of Great Britain. A Lord of the Bedchamber was a courtier in the Royal Household, the term being first used in 1718. The duties of the Gentlemen of the Bedchamber originally consisted of assisting the monarch with dressing, waiting on him when he ate, guarding access to his bedchamber and closet, and providing companionship. Such practical functions became less important over time, but the Gentlemen of the Bedchamber continued to control access to the monarch; they were thus trusted confidants and often extremely powerful. The offices were in the gift of The Crown and were originally sworn by Royal Warrant directed to the Lord Chamberlain.

== Origins ==
Following the abdication of Mary, Queen of Scots in 1567, her one year-old son acceded to the throne of Scotland as King James VI. During his minority, a series of regents held power, with government largely exercised through the Privy Council of Scotland. The king grew up in the company of young nobles, in Stirling Castle, until 1579 when, at 13 years old, he made a ceremonial entry into Edinburgh; this signalled the end of the Regency period and the beginning of his adult rule. The Privy Council, however, was still dominated by protegés of the former regent, the Earl of Morton; so, on 15 April 1580, a new establishment was created with the intention of it forming an alternative centre of power to the Privy Council. Taking inspiration from the French court, it was named the 'Bedchamber'. It had a staff of 24 young Gentlemen, overseen by Esmé Stewart in the office of Lord Chamberlain. The Gentlemen, who were invariably sons of nobles and of barons, did duty in rotation for three months at a time. Throughout the year there were always at least four Gentlemen of the Bedchamber in attendance at the Scottish royal court.

On acceding to the throne of England, king James introduced the Bedchamber to the English court. Once in place, it quickly supplanted the Privy Chamber (its erstwhile Tudor equivalent) in importance and influence. It maintained a decidedly Scottish entourage around the king to begin with: numbered among the Gentlemen of the Bedchamber was only a single Englishman until 1615, when a second was appointed; in all, ten of the fifteen Gentlemen appointed by James I were Scots.

== Description and functions ==
There were always several holders of the office, who were invariably gentlemen and almost invariably peers, often important ones, as the regular access to the monarch which the role brought was the most valuable commodity of the courtier. The duties of the office involved waiting on the King when he ate in private, helping him to dress, guarding the bedchamber and closet, and providing companionship.

After the Restoration, the office of first gentleman of the bedchamber was invariably combined with that of Groom of the Stole. On average the number of Gentlemen varied around 12 but fluctuated from time to time. During the reign of James II there were only eight, and none were appointed during the reign of Queen Anne. The female counterparts to the Gentlemen (or Lords) of the Bedchamber were the Ladies of the Bedchamber (appointed by Queens regnant and consort alike). Working under the Gentlemen, in the same location, were the Grooms of the Bedchamber.

Below is an incomplete list of noblemen who have served as Gentlemen of the Bedchamber or Lords of the Bedchamber:

== Gentlemen of the Bedchamber to James I of England (1603–1625) ==
- 1603: James Hay, 1st Earl of Carlisle
- 1607–1615: Robert Carr
- 1611–1625: Robert Carey
- 1612–?: Henry Gibb
- 1615–?: George Villiers (died 1628).
- 1622–1625: John Murray

== Gentlemen of the Bedchamber to Charles I of England (1625–1649) ==
- 1625–1640: James Erskine, 6th Earl of Buchan
- 1625–?: James Stewart
- 1625–1639: Robert Carey
- ?1625–? Richard Tichborne
- ?1625–? Gerard Fowke
- 1631–1636: James Hay, 1st Earl of Carlisle
- 1643–1649: Montagu Bertie
- 1647–1649: James Harrington

== Gentlemen of the Bedchamber to Charles II of England (1660–1685) ==
- 1650–1657 & 1661–1667 & 1667–1674: George Villiers, 2nd Duke of Buckingham
- 1652–1677: William Crofts, 1st Baron Crofts
- 1660– Sir John Granville (later Earl of Bath) (and Groom of the Stole)
- 1660–1679: Charles Gerard, 1st Earl of Macclesfield
- 1660–1665: Thomas Wentworth, 5th Baron Wentworth
- 1660–1673: John Maitland, 2nd Earl of Lauderdale
- 1660–1677: William Cavendish, 1st Marquess of Newcastle (Duke of Newcastle from 1665)
- 1660–1670: George Monck, 1st Duke of Albemarle
- 1660–1666: James Butler, 1st Marquess of Ormonde (Duke of Ormonde from 1661)
- 1660–1666: Mountjoy Blount, 1st Earl of Newport
- 1661–?: Charles Stewart, 3rd Duke of Richmond (died 1672)
- 1662–1685: Henry Cavendish, Viscount Mansfield (Duke of Newcastle from 1676)
- 1665–1681: James Howard, 3rd Earl of Suffolk
- 1666–1681: Robert Montagu, Viscount Mandeville (Earl of Manchester from 1671)
- 1666–1680: Thomas Butler, 6th Earl of Ossory
- 1667–1680: John Wilmot, 2nd Earl of Rochester
- 1669–1685: Charles Sackville, Lord Buckhurst
- 1672–1683 (extra) & 1673–1682: John Sheffield, 3rd Earl of Mulgrave
- 1672–1674: Edward Cranfield
- 1673–?: Christopher Monck, 2nd Duke of Albemarle (died 1688)
- 1673–1674: Lionel Cranfield, 3rd Earl of Middlesex
- 1673–1674 (extra) & 1674–?: Robert Spencer, 2nd Earl of Sunderland
- 1674–1685: Robert Bertie, 3rd Earl of Lindsey
- 1677–?: Aubrey de Vere, 20th Earl of Oxford (died 1703)
- 1679–?: Richard Jones, 1st Earl of Ranelagh (died 1712)
- 1679–1682 (extra) & 1682–1685: James Hamilton, Earl of Arran
- 1680–?: Peregrine Osborne, Viscount Latimer
- 1680–1685: Thomas Lennard, 1st Earl of Sussex
- 1682–1685: Louis de Duras, 2nd Earl of Feversham (extra)
- 1683–1685: Edward Lee, 1st Earl of Lichfield
- 1685: Thomas Bruce, Lord Bruce

== Gentlemen of the Bedchamber to James II of England (1685–1688) ==
- 1669–1684: Francis Hawley, 1st Baron Hawley
- 1673–?: John Churchill, 1st Baron Churchill
- 1685–1687: Charles Seymour, 6th Duke of Somerset
- 1685–1688: Thomas Bruce, 2nd Earl of Ailesbury
- 1685–1688: Edward Lee, 1st Earl of Lichfield
- 1685–1688: Henry Somerset, 1st Duke of Beaufort
- 1685–1688: James Butler, Earl of Ossory
- 1685–?: John Sheffield, 3rd Earl of Mulgrave
- 1685–1688: Louis de Duras, 2nd Earl of Feversham
- 1687–?: George Douglas, 1st Earl of Dumbarton
- 1688: George FitzRoy, 1st Duke of Northumberland
- 1688: James Cecil, 4th Earl of Salisbury

== Gentlemen of the Bedchamber to William III of England (1689–1702) ==
- 1689–1697: Charles Mordaunt, 1st Earl of Monmouth
- 1689–1699: James Butler, 2nd Duke of Ormonde
- 1689–?: Hon. H. Sydney
- 1689–?: Aubrey de Vere, 20th Earl of Oxford
- 1689–?: John Churchill, 1st Baron Churchill
- 1689–?: Richard Lumley, 2nd Viscount Lumley (Earl of Scarbrough from 1690)
- 1689–1700: Henry Sydney, 1st Earl of Romney
- 1689–?: John Holles, 4th Earl of Clare
- 1689–?: James Douglas, Earl of Drumlanrig
- 1689–1702: Charles Douglas, 2nd Earl of Selkirk
- 1691–1702: Algernon Capell, 2nd Earl of Essex
- 1692–1693: Charles Granville, Viscount Granville
- 1692–1702: Robert Sutton, 2nd Baron Lexinton
- 1697–1702: Charles Boyle, 4th Viscount Dungarvan (Earl of Cork and Burlington from 1698)
- 1699–1702: Charles Butler, 1st Earl of Arran
- 1699–1702: James Hamilton, 4th Duke of Hamilton
- 1700–1702: Charles Howard, 3rd Earl of Carlisle
- 1701–1702: Wriothesley Russell, 2nd Duke of Bedford
- 1701–1702: Arnold van Keppel, 1st Earl of Albemarle

== Gentlemen of the Bedchamber to Prince George of Denmark (1702–1708) ==
- 1703–1705: Scroop Egerton, 4th Earl of Bridgwater
- 1704–?: Thomas Fane, 6th Earl of Westmorland
- 1706–1708: Thomas Howard, 6th Baron Howard of Effingham
- 1708: Henry Clinton, 7th Earl of Lincoln
- ?–?: Archibald Primrose, 1st Earl of Rosebery

== Gentlemen and Lords of the Bedchamber to George I of Great Britain (1714–1727) ==
=== Lord ===
- 1721–1723: 2nd Earl of Bute

=== Gentlemen ===
- 1714–1716: Henry Grey, 1st Duke of Kent
- 1714–1716: Charles Boyle, 4th Earl of Orrery
- 1714–1717: Charles FitzRoy, 2nd Duke of Grafton
- 1714–1721: John Carteret, 2nd Baron Carteret
- 1714–1722: Charles Montagu, 4th Earl of Manchester (Duke of Manchester from 1719)
- 1714–1723: Charles Lennox, 1st Duke of Richmond
- 1714–1727: James Berkeley, 3rd Earl of Berkeley
- 1714–1727: Henry Clinton, 7th Earl of Lincoln
- 1714–1727: John Dalrymple, 2nd Earl of Stair
- 1714–1727: Charles Douglas, 2nd Earl of Selkirk
- 1716–1723: Francis Godolphin, 2nd Earl of Godolphin
- 1716–1727: George Hamilton, 1st Earl of Orkney
- 1717–1727: John Sidney, 6th Earl of Leicester
- 1717–1726: Henry Bentinck, 1st Duke of Portland
- 1717–1727: Henry Lowther, 3rd Viscount Lonsdale
- 1719–1721: Edward Rich, 7th Earl of Warwick
- 1719–1721: Robert Darcy, 3rd Earl of Holderness
- 1719–1727: Scroop Egerton, 4th Earl of Bridgwater (Duke of Bridgwater from 1720)
- 1719–1727: Peregrine Bertie, Marquess of Lindsey
- 1720–?: Charles Douglas, 3rd Duke of Queensberry
- 1720–1723: Anthony Grey, Earl of Harold
- 1721–1727: John Manners, 3rd Duke of Rutland
- 1721–1727: William Montagu, 2nd Duke of Manchester
- 1722–1727: Talbot Yelverton, 1st Earl of Sussex
- 1723–?: Henry Roper, 8th Baron Teynham
- 1723–1727: Charles Townshend, Lord Lynn
- 1723–?: James Waldegrave, 1st Earl Waldegrave
- 1725–?: John West, 7th Baron De La Warr
- 1726–1727: Charles Lennox, 2nd Duke of Richmond
- 1727: James Hamilton, 5th Duke of Hamilton

== Lords and Gentlemen of the Bedchamber to George II of Great Britain (1714–1760) ==
=== Lords ===
- 1722–1751: 2nd Earl of Albemarle; appointed when Prince of Wales.
- 1727–1730: Lord Philip Stanhope
- 1727–1736: Thomas Paget, Lord Paget
- 1727–1738: Lord William Manners
- 1752–1760: George Coventry, 6th Earl of Coventry
- 1757–1760: John Hobart, 2nd Earl of Buckinghamshire

=== Gentlemen ===
- 1714–1721: John Hamilton, 3rd Lord Belhaven and Stenton
- 1714–1722: Charles Paulet, 3rd Duke of Bolton
- 1714–1735: Henry Herbert, Lord Herbert (Earl of Pembroke from 1733)
- 1715–1730: Philip Stanhope, 4th Earl of Chesterfield
- 1718–1722: Edward Watson, Viscount Sondes
- 1719–1736: Henry Paget, Lord Paget
- 1727–1730: Henry Scott, 1st Earl of Deloraine
- 1727–?: William Capell, 3rd Earl of Essex
- 1727–1733: James Hamilton, 5th Duke of Hamilton
- 1727–1739: Charles Douglas, 2nd Earl of Selkirk
- 1727–?: Hugh Fortescue, 1st Earl Clinton
- 1727–?: James Waldegrave, 1st Earl Waldegrave
- 1731–1752: John Murray, 2nd Earl of Dunmore
- 1733–1755: John Poulett, 2nd Earl Poulett
- 1733–1747: William Clavering-Cowper, 2nd Earl Cowper
- 1735–1751: Simon Harcourt, 2nd Viscount Harcourt (Earl Harcourt from 1749)
- 1737–?: Charles Bennet, 2nd Earl of Tankerville
- 1738–1743: Charles Spencer, 3rd Duke of Marlborough
- 1738–1755: William Nassau de Zuylestein, 4th Earl of Rochford
- 1738–1751: Charles Beauclerk, 2nd Duke of St Albans
- 1738–1760: Thomas Belasyse, 4th Viscount Fauconberg (Earl Fauconberg from 1756)
- 1739–1760: Robert Montagu, 3rd Duke of Manchester
- 1741–1751: Robert Darcy, 4th Earl of Holderness
- 1741–?: Evelyn Pierrepont, 2nd Duke of Kingston-upon-Hull
- 1743–1752: James Waldegrave, 2nd Earl Waldegrave
- 1743–1760: Henry Clinton, 9th Earl of Lincoln
- 1748–1760: John Ashburnham, 2nd Earl of Ashburnham
- 1751–1760: Francis Seymour-Conway, 1st Earl of Hertford
- 1751–1756: William FitzWilliam, 3rd Earl FitzWilliam
- 1751–1760: Charles Watson-Wentworth, 2nd Marquess of Rockingham
- 1752–?: James Carmichael, 3rd Earl of Hyndford
- 1753–1760: Hugh Percy, 1st Earl of Northumberland
- 1755–1760: Peregrine Bertie, 3rd Duke of Ancaster and Kesteven
- 1755–1760: William Capell, 4th Earl of Essex
- 1755–1760: George Walpole, 3rd Earl of Orford
- 1756–1757: John Hobart, 2nd Earl of Buckinghamshire

== Gentlemen of the Bedchamber to Frederick, Prince of Wales (1729–1751) ==
- 1729–1731: John Ashburnham, 1st Earl of Ashburnham
- 1729–1742: Henry Brydges, Marquess of Carnarvon
- 1729–1730: Lord Charles Cavendish
- 1729–1751: Harry Paulet, 4th Duke of Bolton
- 1730–1733: Charles Bennet, 2nd Earl of Tankerville
- 1730–1751: Francis North, 4th Baron Guilford
- 1731–1749: Charles Calvert, 5th Baron Baltimore
- 1733–1738: William Villiers, 3rd Earl of Jersey
- 1738–1751: Charles Douglas, 3rd Duke of Queensberry
- 1742–1743: George Montagu-Dunk, 2nd Earl of Halifax
- 1742–1745: Edward Bligh, 2nd Earl of Darnley
- 1744–1751: William O'Brien, 4th Earl of Inchiquin
- 1747–1750: Arthur St Leger, 3rd Viscount Doneraile
- 1748–1751: John Perceval, 2nd Earl of Egmont
- 1749–1751: Lord Robert Manners-Sutton
- 1750–1751: John Stuart, 3rd Earl of Bute

== Lords and Gentlemen of the Bedchamber to George III of the United Kingdom (1751–1820) ==
=== Lords ===
- 1747–1750: Arthur St Leger, 3rd Viscount Doneraile (to Prince George)
- 1749–1751: Lord Robert Manners-Sutton (to Prince George)
- 1751–1782: Lord Robert Bertie (1751–1760 to Prince George)
- 1760–1761: George Lee, 3rd Earl of Lichfield
- 1760–1767: John Hobart, 2nd Earl of Buckinghamshire
- 1760–1770: George Coventry, 6th Earl of Coventry
- 1761–1790: Edward Harley
- 1767–1770: Norborne Berkeley, 4th Baron Botetourt
- 1777–1783: Heneage Finch, 4th Earl of Aylesford
- 1782–1803: George Pitt, 1st Baron Rivers
- 1800–1810: John Townshend, 2nd Viscount Sydney
- 1804–1819: George Pitt, 2nd Baron Rivers

=== Gentlemen ===
- 1760–1765: Peregrine Bertie, 3rd Duke of Ancaster and Kesteven
- 1760–1761: Robert Montagu, 3rd Duke of Manchester
- 1760–1762: Charles Watson-Wentworth, 2nd Marquess of Rockingham
- 1760–1761: Thomas Belasyse, 1st Earl Fauconberg
- 1760–1762: Henry Clinton, 9th Earl of Lincoln
- 1760–1762: John Ashburnham, 2nd Earl of Ashburnham
- 1760–1766: Francis Seymour-Conway, 8th Earl of Hertford
- 1760–1761: John Carmichael, 3rd Earl of Hyndford
- 1760–1762: Hugh Percy, 2nd Earl of Northumberland
- 1760–1761 & 1782–1799: William Capell, 4th Earl of Essex
- 1760–1782: George Walpole, 3rd Earl of Orford
- 1760–1763: Thomas Thynne, 3rd Viscount Weymouth
- 1760–1764: James Brydges, Marquess of Carnarvon
- 1760: Henry Dawnay, 3rd Viscount Downe
- 1760–1763: William Pulteney, Viscount Pulteney
- 1760–1776: Thomas Brudenell-Bruce, 2nd Baron Bruce
- 1760–1789: William Douglas, Earl of March
- 1760–1767: Alexander Montgomerie, 10th Earl of Eglinton
- 1761–1806?: Charles Lennox, 3rd Duke of Richmond
- 1761–1762: George Lee, 3rd Earl of Lichfield
- 1761–1763 & 1770–1780: Henry Herbert, 10th Earl of Pembroke
- 1762-?: Samuel Masham, 2nd Baron Masham
- 1762–1765 & 1768–1780: Frederick St John, 2nd Viscount Bolingbroke
- 1763–1781: George Fermor, 2nd Earl of Pomfret
- 1763–?: John Peyto-Verney, 14th Baron Willoughby de Broke
- 1763–1770: George Montagu, 4th Duke of Manchester
- 1763–1800: Basil Feilding, 6th Earl of Denbigh
- 1765–1765: Charles Cornwallis, 2nd Earl Cornwallis
- 1767–1796: John Ker, 3rd Duke of Roxburghe
- 1769–?: George Villiers, 4th Earl of Jersey (extra)
- 1776–1777: Francis Osborne, Marquess of Carmarthen
- 1777–1802: Henry Belasyse, 2nd Earl Fauconberg
- 1777–1812: George Finch, 9th Earl of Winchilsea
- 1780–1814: George Onslow, 4th Baron Onslow (later Earl of Onslow)
- 1780–1820: Frederick Irby, 2nd Baron Boston
- 1783–1806: John Stewart, 7th Earl of Galloway
- 1789–1795: John West, 4th Earl De La Warr
- 1790–1815: Thomas Noel, 2nd Viscount Wentworth
- 1795–1819: John Poulett, 4th Earl Poulett
- 1797–?: George Parker, 4th Earl of Macclesfield
- 1799–?: John Somerville, 15th Lord Somerville
- 1802–? & 1804–1813: William Amherst, 2nd Baron Amherst
- 1803–? George Nugent, 7th Earl of Westmeath
- 1804–1812: Charles Perceval, 2nd Baron Arden
- 1804–?: Alleyne FitzHerbert, 1st Baron St Helens
- 1812–1820: James Murray, 1st Lord Glenlyon
- 1812–1820: Charles Stanhope, 4th Earl of Harrington

== Lords and Gentlemen of the Bedchamber to George IV of the United Kingdom (1780–1830) ==
=== Lord ===
- 1812–1828: Peniston Lamb, 1st Viscount Melbourne

=== Gentlemen ===
- 1780–1784: James Stopford, 2nd Earl of Courtown
- 1780–1781: Lord John Pelham-Clinton
- 1780–?: George Parker, Viscount Parker
- 1782–1783: George Legge, Viscount Lewisham
- 1783–1796: Peniston Lamb, 1st Viscount Melbourne
- 1784–1795: George Ashburnham, Viscount St Asaph
- 1789–?: William Fortescue, 1st Earl of Clermont
- 1814–1830: Charles William Vane, 3rd Marquess of Londonderry
- 1819–1821: James Duff, 4th Earl Fife
- 1820–1825: Frederick Irby, 2nd Baron Boston
- 1820–1823 & 1829–1830: William Amherst, 1st Earl Amherst
- 1820–1829: Charles Stanhope, 4th Earl of Harrington
- 1820–1830: James Murray, 1st Baron Glenlyon
- 1826–1830: Charles Gordon, Lord Strathavon
- 1827–1830: James Duff, 4th Earl Fife
- 1828–1830: Henry Greville, 3rd Earl of Warwick
- 1829–1830: Richard Curzon-Howe, 1st Earl Howe

== Lords and Gentlemen of the Bedchamber to William IV of the United Kingdom (1830–1837) ==
=== Lords of the Bedchamber to King William IV (1830–1837) ===
- 1830–18: Lord St. Helens
- 1830–1832: Lord Glenlyon
- 1830–18: Lord Lovaine
- 1830: Lord Strathaven
- 1830–1835: Earl of Fife
- 1830–1832: Lord Clinton
- 1830–18: Earl of Warwick
- 1830–1831: Earl of Roden
- 1830–18: Earl of Chesterfield
- 1830–1835: Earl Amherst
- 1830–1837: Lord James O'Bryen
- 1830–1831: Marquess of Hastings
- 1830–1833: Earl of Denbigh
- 1831–1834: Earl of Gosford
- 1831–1835: Marquess of Queensbury
- 1830–1831: Earl of Waldegrave
- 1831–-1837: Lord Lilford
- 1832–1837: Viscount Ashbrook
- 1832–1836: Lord Elphinstone

=== Gentlemen ===
- 1835–1837: James Duff, 4th Earl Fife
- 1830–?: Lord James O'Brien
- 1830–?: William Napier, 9th Lord Napier
- 1830–1837: George Byron, 7th Baron Byron
- 1830–1837: Lucius Cary, 10th Viscount Falkland
- 1833–1837: Lord Adolphus FitzClarence
- 1834–1835 & 1835–1837: George Byng, 7th Viscount Torrington
- 1834–?: Alan Gardner, 3rd Baron Gardner
- 1834–1837: William Bury, Lord Tullamore
- 1834–1837: Lord Ernest Brudenell-Bruce
- 1834–1837: George Holroyd, 2nd Earl of Sheffield
- 1835–1837: James Grimston, 1st Earl of Verulam
- 1835–1837: Philip Sidney, 1st Baron De L'Isle and Dudley
- 1835–1837: John Townshend, 3rd Viscount Sydney
- 1835–1837: George Douglas, 17th Earl of Morton
- 1835–1837: Thomas Taylour, 2nd Marquess of Headfort
- 1835–1837: Arthur Chichester, 1st Baron Templemore
- 1836–1837: Lord John Gordon

== Lords of the Bedchamber to Prince Albert (1840–1861) ==
- 1840–1861: Lord John Lennox
- 1859–1861: Henry Cavendish, 3rd Baron Waterpark

== Lords of the Bedchamber to Edward, Prince of Wales, later King Edward VII (1866–1901) ==
- 1866–1883: James Hamilton, 2nd Duke of Abercorn
- 1872–1901: Charles Harbord, 5th Baron Suffield

Following Edward's accession to the throne, Baron Suffield was gazetted as a "Lord in Waiting" to the King.

== Lords of the Bedchamber to George, Prince of Wales (1901–1910), later King George V (1910-1936) ==
- 1901–1910: Beilby Lawley, 3rd Baron Wenlock
- 1901–1907: Charles Cavendish, 3rd Baron Chesham
- 1908–1921: Luke White, 3rd Baron Annaly

Following George's accession to the throne, Baron Annaly was initially gazetted as "Lord of the Bedchamber in Waiting" to the king; but was subsequently referred to as "Lord in Waiting", or "Permanent Lord in Waiting", to His Majesty.

== See also ==
- Grand Chamberlain of France (Gentilhomme de la Chambre), who would oversee the French king's entertainments and physicians.
- Gentilhombres Grandes de España con ejercicio y servidumbre Similar position in Spain
- Lady of the Bedchamber (equivalent position in the time of a queen regnant, and for a queen consort)
- Groom of the Robes
- Groom of the Stool

== Sources ==
- Burke's Peerage
- A Political Index to the Histories of Great Britain and Ireland
