= Elizabeth Churchill, Countess of Bridgewater =

English noblewoman (1687–1714)

The Right Honourable The Countess of Bridgewater
- Elizabeth Churchill, Countess of Bridgewater

Countess of Bridgewater
- Tenure: 9 February 1703 – 22 March 1714 (11 years, 41 days)
- Predecessor: Jane Paulet
- Successor: Rachel Russell
- Other titles: Viscountess Brackley; Baroness Ellesmere
- Born: Lady Elizabeth Churchill; 15 March 1687
- Died: 22 March 1714 (aged 27)
- Buried: 29 March 1714; Little Gaddesden
- Noble family: Churchill; Egerton (by marriage)
- Spouse: Scroop Egerton, 1st Duke of Bridgewater (m. 1700)
- Issue: John Egerton, Viscount Brackley; Anne Egerton, Duchess of Bedford
- Father: John Churchill, 1st Duke of Marlborough
- Mother: Sarah Jenyns

Elizabeth Churchill, Countess of Bridgewater (15 March 1687 – 22 March 1714), born Lady Elizabeth Churchill, was the daughter of John Churchill, 1st Duke of Marlborough, and Sarah Jenyns. By marriage to Scroop Egerton, 1st Duke of Bridgewater, then 4th Count of Bridgewater, she was the Countess of Bridgewater.

== Family ==
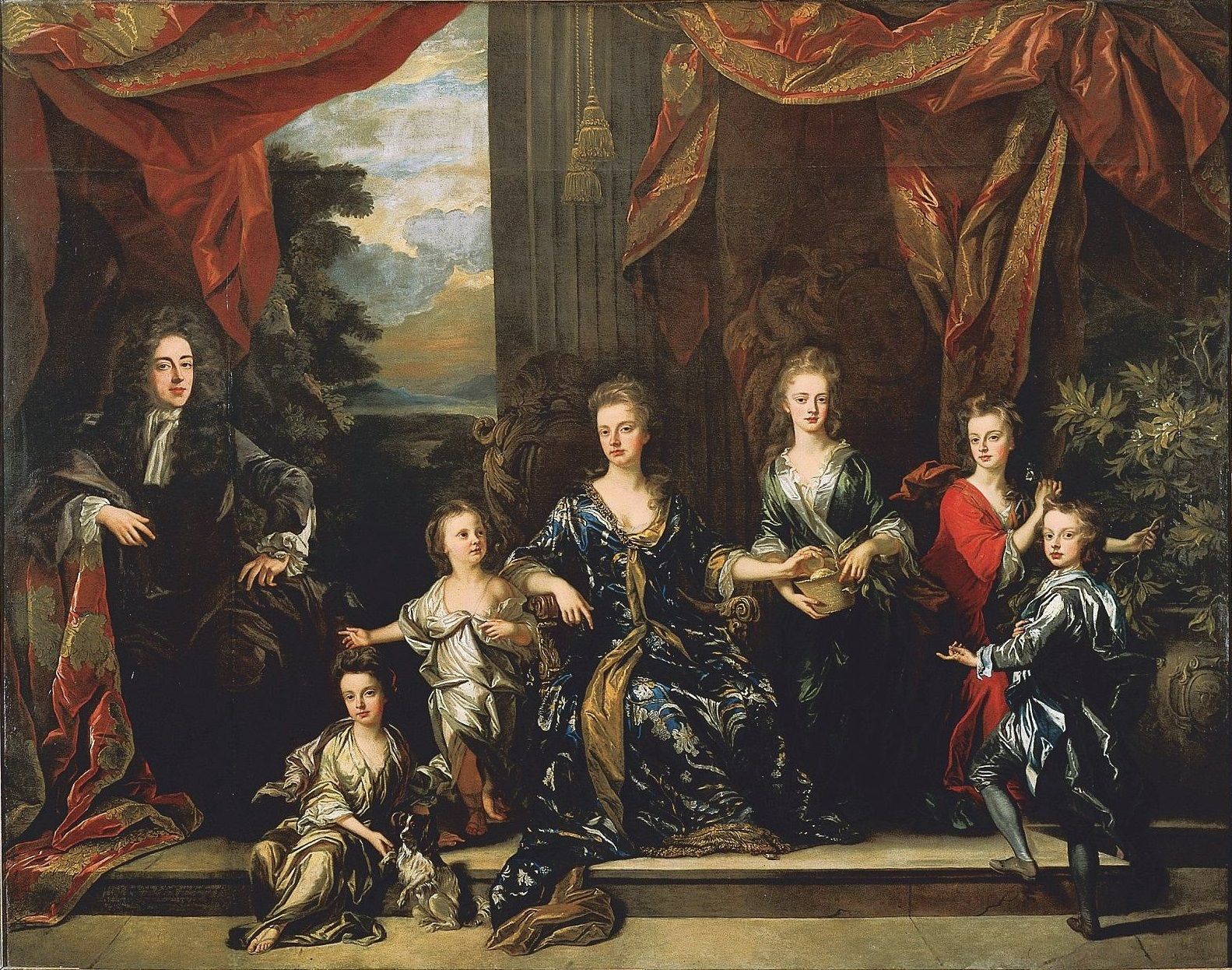
The family of John Churchill, 1st Duke of Marlborough. From left to right: The Duke of Marlborough, Elizabeth, Mary, The Duchess of Marlborough, Henrietta, Anne and John

Elizabeth Churchill was born on 15 March 1687. (Note: Some sources note that she was born in 1688, such as .) She was the fourth daughter and fifth child of John Churchill, 1st Duke of Marlborough, and Sarah Jenyns. Elizabeth's godparents were Anna Charlotte de Vic, Baroness Frescheville and Barbara Villiers, Viscountess Fitzhardinge. Lady Freschville and Lady Fitzhardinge were also godparents of the Marlborough's two youngest children, Mary and Charles Churchill.

According to an Act of Parliament on 21 June 1706, allowing the 1st Duke's daughters to inherit his English title, Elizabeth became co-heir of her father like her other sisters Henrietta, Anne and Mary.

Elizabeth was described as "agreeably tall" and spoke "without saying too much or too little". Of four sisters, who were all exquisite beauties, Elizabeth was the most beautiful. While Elizabeth and her sister Anne were Sarah's favourite children, Elizabeth's oldest and youngest sisters Henrietta and Mary had tough relationship with Sarah. Elizabeth also had an especially close relationship with her sister Anne Churchill.

== Marriage ==
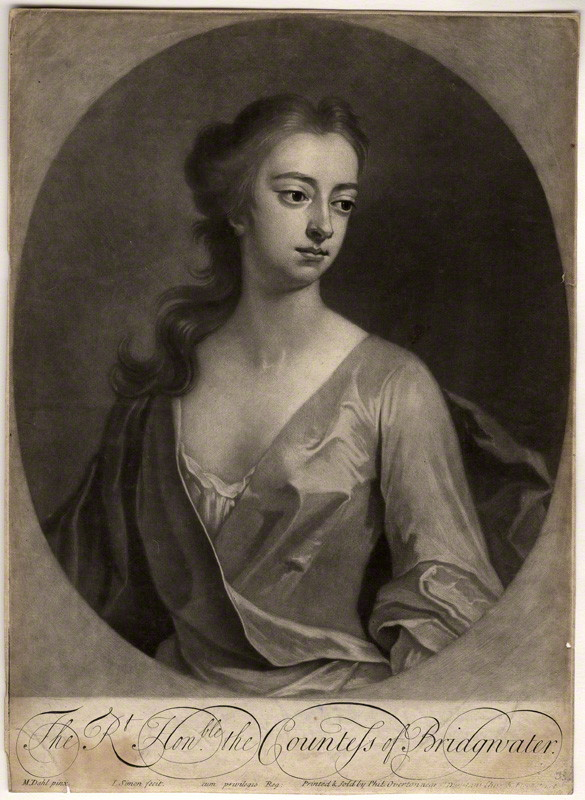
Elizabeth Churchill, Countess of Bridgewater

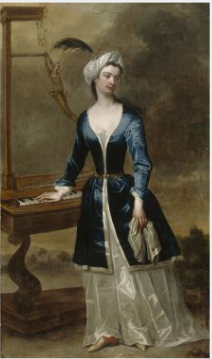
Portrait of Elizabeth Churchill, Countess of Bridgewater, circa 1710–1714

On 9 February 1703, at fourteen years old, Elizabeth Churchill married Scroop Egerton, 4th Count of Bridgewater. At the wedding, Queen Anne gave a gift of 5,000 pounds to Elizabeth, as she had done to Elizabeth's two older sisters Henrietta and Anne. Although Elizabeth's mother thought him as a "fool", Elizabeth and her husband had an idyllically happy married life.

== Children ==
Elizabeth Churchill and Scroop Egerton had three children:

- John Egerton, Viscount Brackley (3 February 1704 – 30 January 1719), he died of smallpox at Eton and was buried at Little Gaddesden on 5 February 1719.
- A son (died young).
- Anne Egerton (1705 – 16 June 1762), married firstly to Wriothesley Russell, 3rd Duke of Bedford and had no issue. After the Duke of Bedford died, she remarried to William Villiers, 3rd Earl of Jersey on 23 June 1733 and had two sons with him. Through Anne, they are ancestors of Diana, Princess of Wales, and of her sons, Princes William, the Prince of Wales, and Harry, Duke of Sussex.

== Death ==
Elizabeth Churchill died on 22 March 1714. (Note: Some sources, such as , note that she died in 1713.) The reason of her death was smallpox. The Dowager Countess of Bridgewater informed the news to the Marlboroughs. She also consoled Sarah that "Nobody suffered less under that disease and her death was as if she only had gone to sleep." Hearing the news of his beloved daughter's death, the Duke of Marlborough fainted, hitting his head on a marble mantlepiece. The death of Elizabeth also worsened Anne's sickness, in grief at the death of her younger sister.

Elizabeth Churchill was buried at Little Gaddesden on 29 March 1714. After her death, her husband was created Duke of Bridgewater, remarried and had other children. Her daughter Anne Egerton was first taken care of by her paternal grandmother, but after finding that the child "very ill cared for", Sarah decided to look after her as her own daughter. Her son, John Egerton, died of smallpox when he was 15 years old.

== Ancestry ==
Ancestors of Elizabeth Churchill, Countess of Bridgewater

16. Jasper Churchill
8. John Churchill
17. Elizabeth Chaplet
4. Winston Churchill
18.
9. Sarah Winston
19.
2. John Churchill, 1st Duke of Marlborough
20.
10.
21.
5. Elizabeth Drake
22.
11.
23.
1. Elizabeth Churchill
24. John Jennings
12. John Jennings
25. Anne Brouncker
6. Richard Jenyns
26.
13. Alicia Spencer
27.
3. Sarah Jennings
28.
14.
29.
7. Frances Thornhurst
30.
15.
31.

== Bibliography ==
- Noble, Mark (1806). A Biographical History of England, from the Revolution to the End of George I's Reign: Being a Continuation of the Rev. J. Granger's Work; Consisting of Characters Disposed in Different Classes; and Adapted to a Methodical Catalogue of Engraved British Heads; Interspersed with a Variety of Anecdotes, and Memoirs of a Great Number of Persons. Vol. 2. W. Richardson.
- Field, Ophelia (2003). The Favourite: Sarah, Duchess of Marlborough. London: Sceptre. ISBN 978-0-340-76808-2.
- Campbell, Kathleen Winifred (1933). Sarah, Duchess of Marlborough. London, T. Butterworth.
- Green, David Brontë (1967). Sarah, Duchess of Marlborough. New York, Scribner.
- Massey, Victoria (1999). The first Lady Diana. London House. ISBN 978-1-902809-01-4.
- Cokayne, George Edward (1912). The Complete Peerage of England, Scotland, Ireland, Great Britain and the United Kingdom: Bass to Canning. St. Catherine Press, Limited.
- Cokayne, George Edward (1887a). Complete Peerage of England, Scotland, Ireland, Great Britain and the United Kingdom. Harvard University. London, G. Bell & sons.
- Cokayne, George Edward (1887b). The Complete Peerage (Edition 1, Volume 1).
- Hibbert, Christopher (2001). The Marlboroughs: John and Sarah Churchill, 1650-1744. London: Viking. ISBN 978-0-670-88677-7.

Peerage of England
Preceded by Jane Paulet	Countess of Bridgewater; 1703–1714	Succeeded by Rachael Russell
