= Francis Egerton, 3rd Duke of Bridgewater =

English peer (1736–1803)

His Grace The Duke of Bridgewater
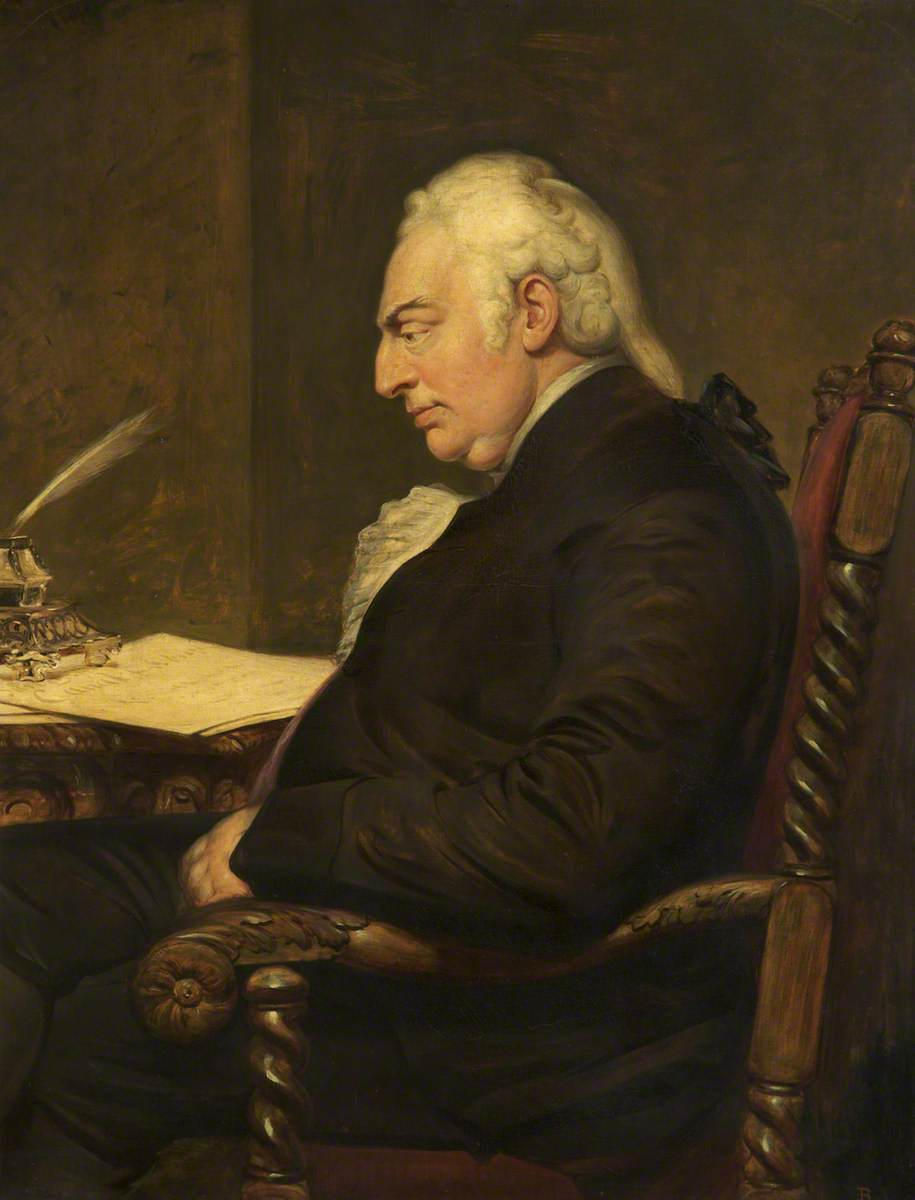
- 1868 portrait
- Born: 21 May 1736
- Died: 8 March 1803
- Resting place: Church of St Peter and St Paul, Little Gaddesden, Hertfordshire; 51.81409°N 0.55380°W
- Other names: Francis Egerton, 3rd and last Duke of Bridgewater, Marquess of Brackley, Earl of Ellesmere, Baron Egerton.
- Occupation: Canal builder
- Known for: Bridgewater Canal
- Title: Duke of Bridgewater
- Predecessor: John Egerton, 2nd Duke of Bridgewater
- Successor: title extinct
- Political party: Whig
- Parent(s): Scroop Egerton, 1st Duke of Bridgewater; Lady Rachael Russell

Francis Egerton, 3rd Duke of Bridgewater (21 May 1736 – 8 March 1803), known as Lord Francis Egerton until 1748, was an English peer from the Egerton family. He was the youngest son of the 1st Duke. He did not marry, and the dukedom expired with him, although the earldom was inherited by a cousin, Lieutenant-General John Egerton.

A pioneer of canal construction, he is famed as the "father of British inland navigation", who commissioned the Bridgewater Canal—often said to be the first true canal in Britain, and the modern world. The canal was built for him by his agent John Gilbert with advice from James Brindley to service his coal mines at Worsley, in Lancashire.

== Life ==
Bridgewater, the younger son of Scroop Egerton, 1st Duke of Bridgewater, was born on 21 May 1736. Upon the death of their father in 1745, his elder brother inherited the title to become John Egerton, 2nd Duke of Bridgewater. He died only three years later, and Francis succeeded to the dukedom at the age of twelve, becoming 3rd Duke of Bridgewater and 6th Earl of Bridgewater.

As a child Francis was sickly and of such unpromising intellectual capacity that at one time the idea of cutting the entail was seriously entertained by his mother. Despite this, after some education, Francis began to exhibit business acumen and developed several business interests in North-West England.

Shortly after attaining his majority he became engaged to the society beauty the Dowager Duchess of Hamilton, but her refusal to give up the acquaintance of her sister, Lady Coventry, led to the breaking off of the match. Thereupon the Duke broke up his London establishment, and retired to his estate at Worsley where he devoted himself to the making of canals.

=== Canals ===
The Bridgewater Canal from Worsley to Manchester which he constructed to transport coal obtained on his estates is usually cited as the first modern British canal as opposed to a river navigation—although the Sankey Canal is a rival to this claim, projected as a "navigation", but built as a true canal. The construction of Bridgewater's canal, with its aqueduct across the River Irwell, was carried out by James Brindley, the celebrated engineer.

The completion of his first canal led the duke to undertake a more ambitious work. In 1762 he obtained parliamentary powers to provide an improved waterway between Liverpool and Manchester by means of a canal. The execution of the canal faced formidable challenges, including traversing Sale Moor Moss. However, the expertise of John Gilbert, his agent, and Brindley, the engineer, overcame all obstacles, leading to a successful completion despite the duke's dwindling financial resources.

Both canals were completed by the time Bridgewater was thirty-six years of age, and the remainder of his life was spent in extending them and in improving his estates. During the latter years of his life he derived a princely income from the success of his enterprise. Although a supporter of Pitt's administration, he took no prominent part in politics.

=== Wealth ===
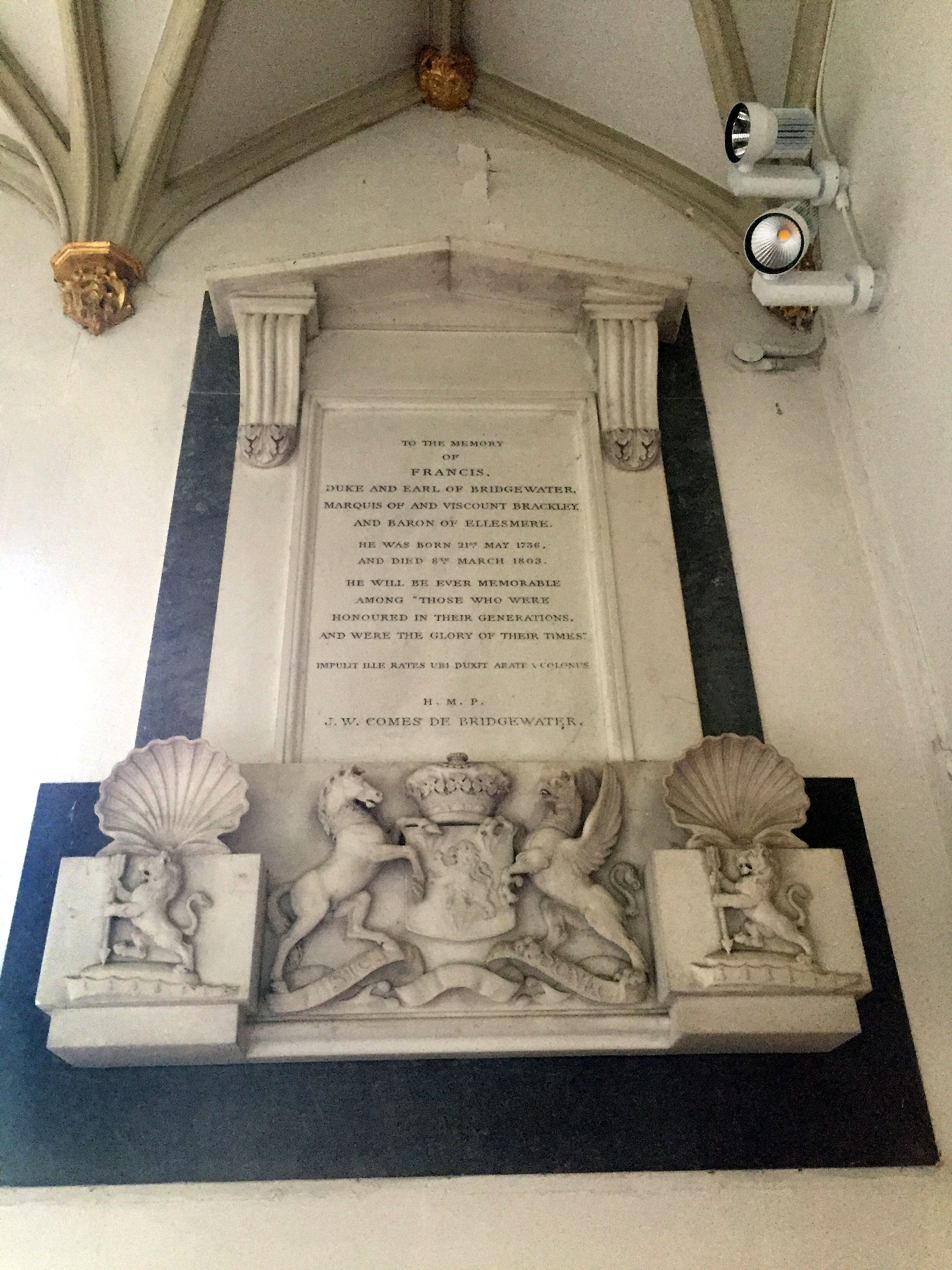
Memorial to the 3rd Duke of Bridgewater in the Bridgewater Chapel at St. Peter and St. Paul Church, Little Gaddesden, where many Egerton family members are buried

The duke accumulated great wealth through his canal and coal interests. His annual income was said to have exceeded £80,000. The family owned other estates: Belton House, a small Sussex estate and the Old House and, 6,000 acres (24 km^{2}) at Ashridge. On leaving his Brackley and Worsley estates, the duke had an annual income in taxes and duties of £75,000 (estimated in 1997 as £2,360,000). The father of the first duke had bought Cleveland House in St James, London, which was rebuilt to the designs of Sir Charles Barry in 1840 and renamed Bridgewater House in 1854 for Lord Ellesmere, heir of the 3rd Duke.

With the Bridgewater fortune exceeding £2,000,000, the duke, the richest nobleman in England, set about rebuilding Ashridge. He began to pull the old buildings down, but he died before his plans could be completed, leaving his heir with nothing but rubble. He was the leading member of the syndicate which purchased and partly resold the famous Orleans Collection, from the banker Jeremiah Harman in 1789.

He acquired an art collection valued at £150,000 (estimated in 1997 about £4.75 million). In 1798 he purchased en bloc sixty-four Italian and French paintings including Raphael, Titian, Annibale Carracci and Nicolas Poussin. Notable were several old master paintings including Diana and Actaeon and Diana and Callisto. It was inherited by his heir, 1st Duke of Sutherland. Most of his purchases are still held by the Egerton family.

== Legacy and memorials ==
The duke died unmarried on 8 March 1803, and the ducal title became extinct although the Earldom of Bridgewater passed to a cousin, Lieutenant-General John Egerton, who became 7th Earl). The 3rd Duke of Bridgewater was buried in the Egerton family vault in the Church of St Peter and St Paul in Little Gaddesden, close to Ashridge.

Bridgewater Estates Act 1865
- Act of Parliament
- Parliament of the United Kingdom
- Long title: An Act to enlarge and amend the Powers and Provisions relating to the Management and Improvement of the Property subject to the Trusts of the Will of the Most Noble Francis late Duke of Bridgewater.
- Citation: 28 & 29 Vict. c. 1 Pr.

Dates
- Royal assent: 5 July 1865

Text of statute as originally enacted

By his will the duke devised his canals and estates on trust, under which his nephew, the 2nd Marquess of Stafford (afterwards 1st Duke of Sutherland), became the first beneficiary, and next his son Lord Francis Leveson-Gower (afterwards 1st Earl of Ellesmere) and his issue. In order that the trust should last as long as possible, an extraordinary use was made of the legal rule that property may be settled for the duration of lives in being and twenty-one years after. The legatees were a great number of persons connected with the duke and their living issue, plus all peers who had taken their seats in the House of Lords on or before the duke's decease. The last of the peers died in 1857, but one of the commoners survived till 19 October 1883, and so the trust did not expire until 19 October 1903, when the whole property passed to the undivided control of Francis Egerton, 3rd Earl of Ellesmere. The canals had by then been transferred to the Bridgewater Navigation Company in 1872, by whom they were sold in 1887 to the Manchester Ship Canal Company.

The duke is commemorated in a number of locations around Britain. A marble wall monument in Little Gaddesden Church is dedicated to his memory, and on the nearby Ashridge Estate, the Bridgewater Monument was erected in 1832 'in honour of Francis, Third duke of Bridgewater, "Father of Inland Navigation"'. The Bridgewater Canal in North West England, still in existence today, bears the Duke's name.

In the 1830s, the possibility was discussed of raising a memorial to the Canal Duke in Manchester, but at the time public statuary was relatively unknown outside London. Illustrations exist of unrealised 1836 proposal by William Fairbairn to build a Bridgewater Crescent at the eastern end of Piccadilly in Manchester, to be adorned with a statue of the Duke of Bridgewater. To date, no statue has been erected in Manchester to commemorate the Canal Duke.

A 1788 portrait drawing of the Duke of Bridgewater by William Marshall Craig was engraved by Edward Scriven in 1835; prints are held in the National Portrait Gallery, London and the Scottish National Gallery in Edinburgh. Two Wax medallion portraits of the Duke by Peter Rouw dating from 1803 are held at the National Portrait Gallery and at Tatton Hall in Cheshire.

Francis Egerton is depicted in one of The Manchester Murals painted by Ford Madox Brown between 1879 and 1893. The Opening of the Bridgewater Canal A.D. 1761 shows the Duke of Bridgewater standing on a barge decorated with flags of his coat of arms, alongside engineer James Brindley, observing the launch of the first coal barges on his new canal.

In 1905, Francis Egerton, 3rd Earl of Ellesmere erected a fountain in Worsley Green, Salford, in memory of the Duke of Bridgewater, after a former factory built by the duke there was demolished. In 1996, a new concert hall named after the duke was opened in Manchester, the Bridgewater Hall — although the hall is actually situated next to the adjoining Rochdale Canal.

Memorials to the Canal Duke

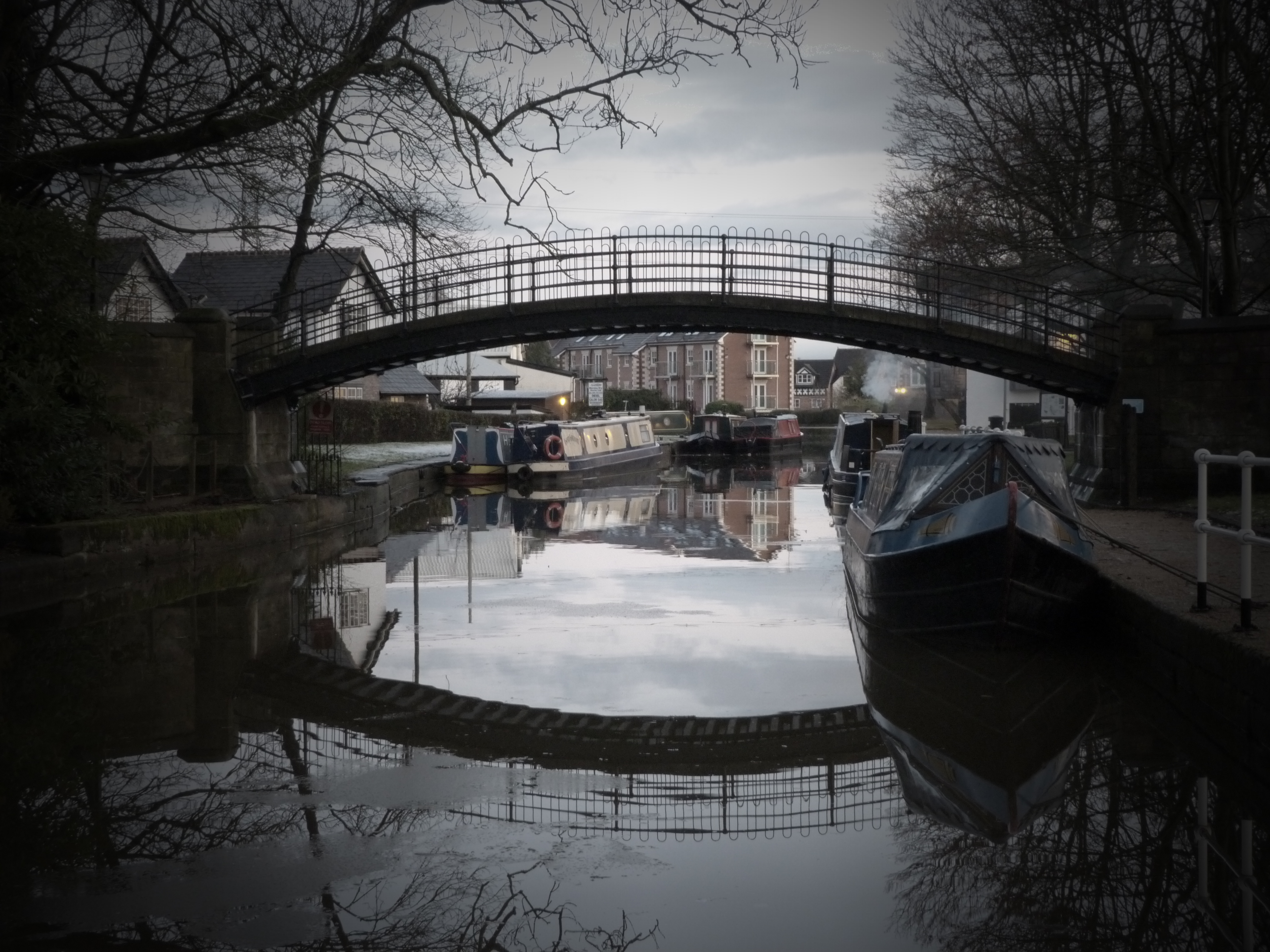
The Bridgewater Canal

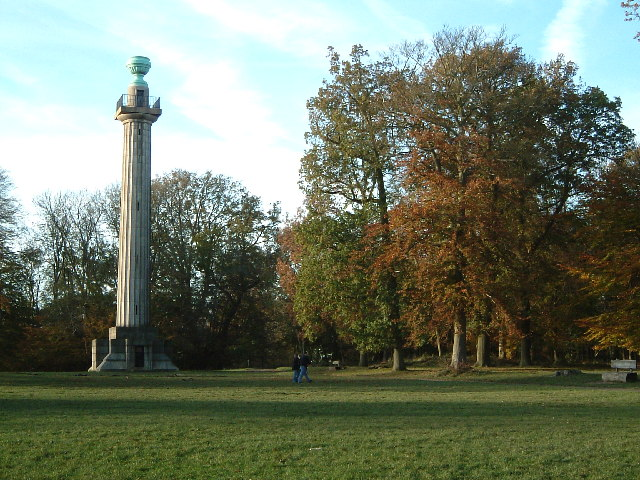
The Bridgewater Monument in Ashridge (1832)

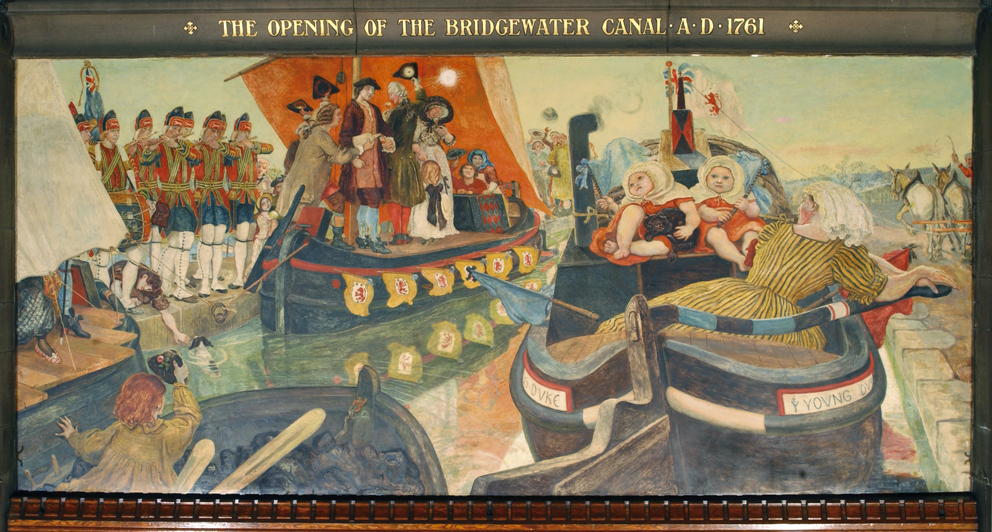
"The Opening of the Bridgewater Canal A.D. 1761" by Ford Madox Brown in Manchester Town Hall.

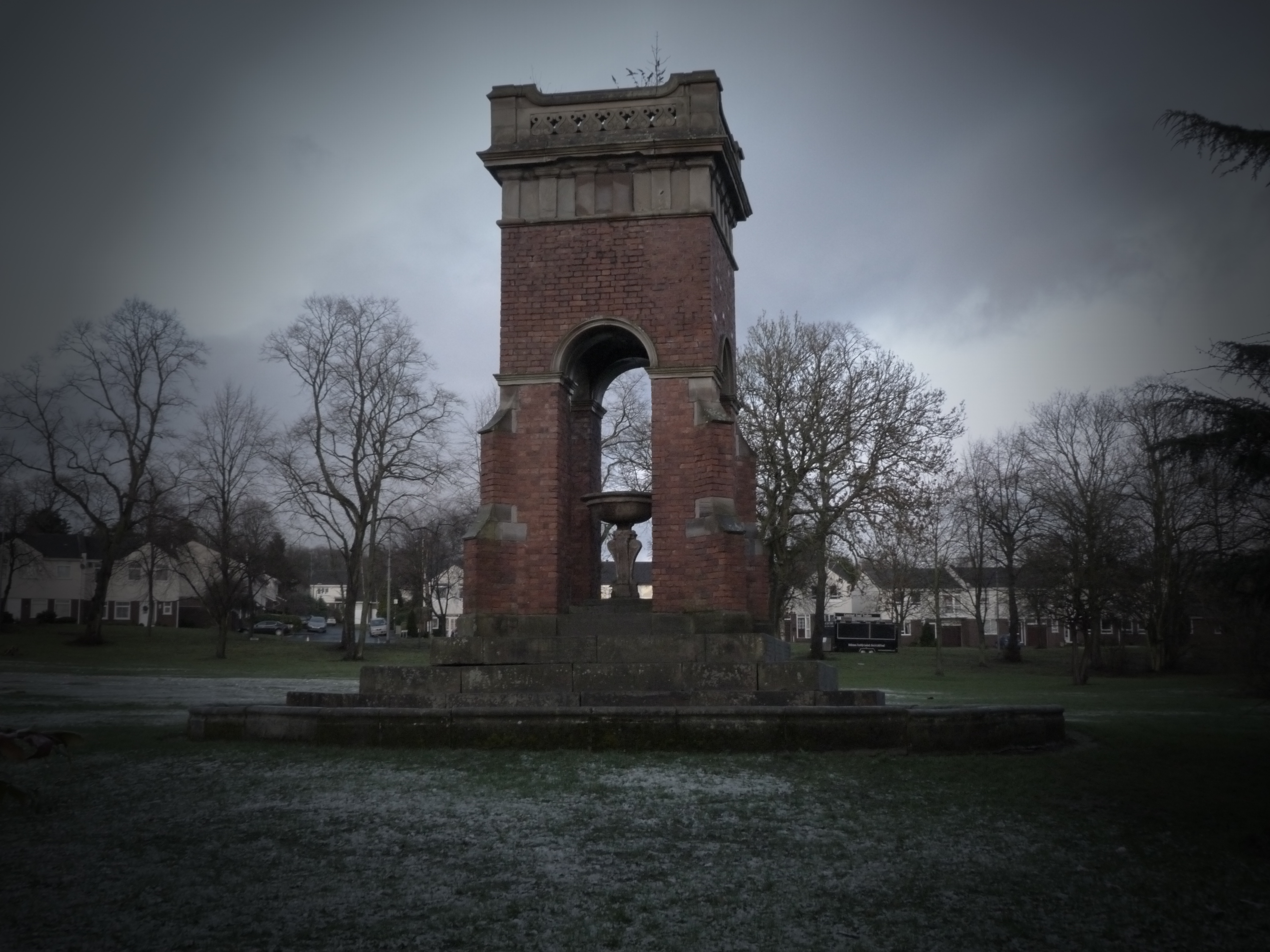
The Worsley Green Fountain (1905)

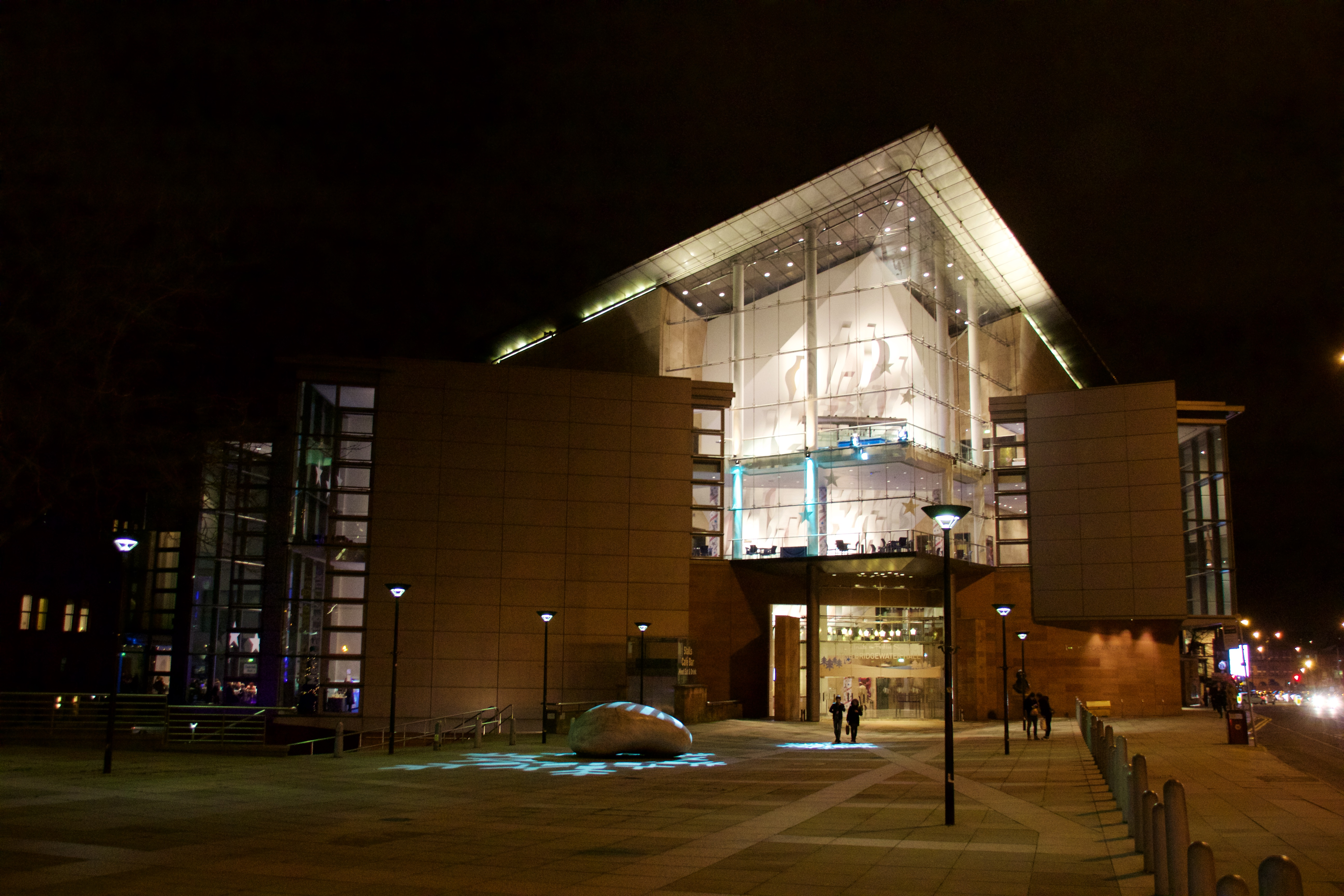
The Bridgewater Hall, Manchester (1996)

== Ancestry ==
Francis Egerton, 3rd Duke of Bridgewater
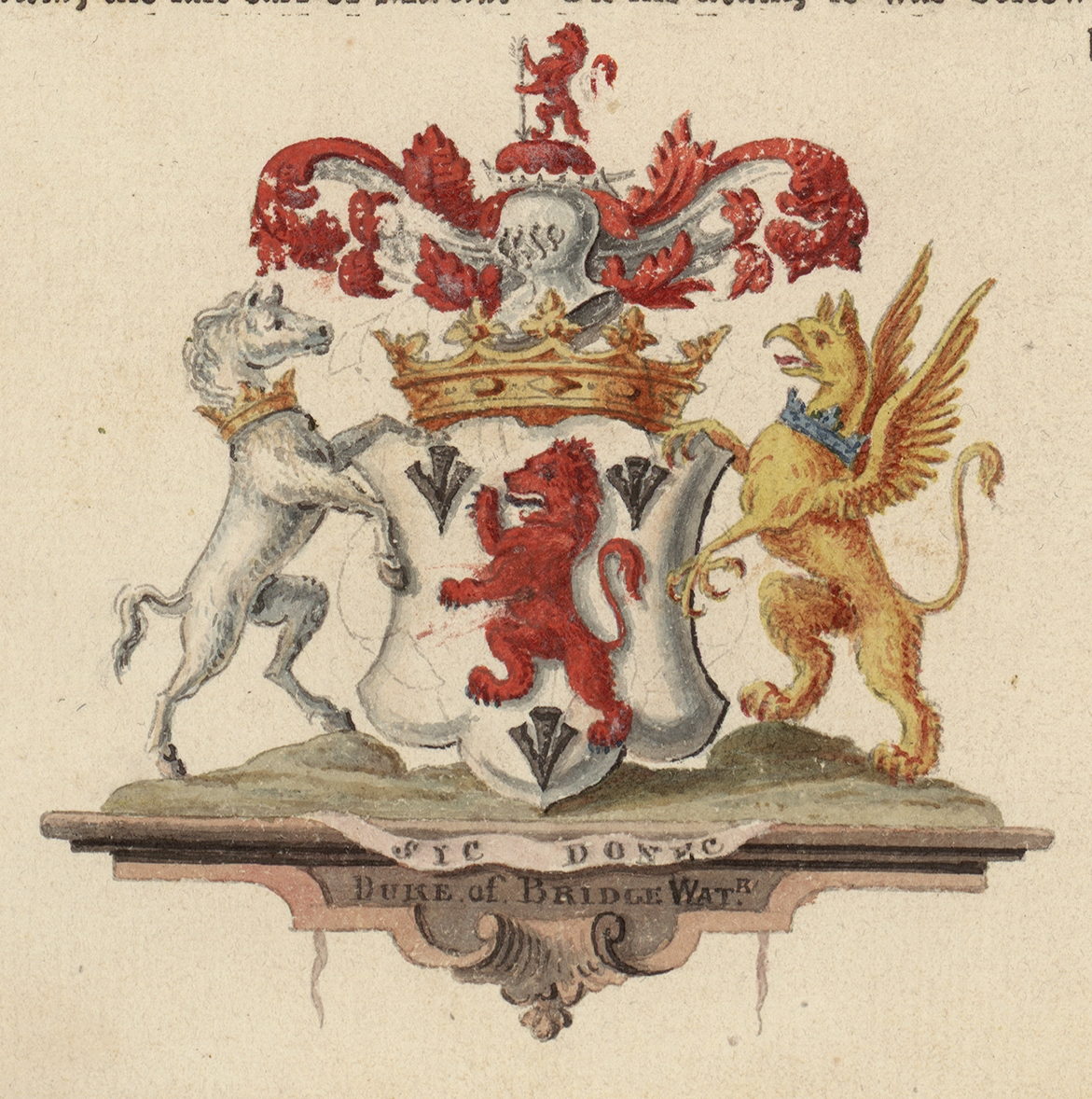
- Crest: On a Chapeau Gules turned up Ermine a Lion rampant of the first supporting an Arrow erect Or headed and feathered Argent
- Supporters: Dexter: A Horse rearing Argent gorged with a Ducal coronet Or; Sinister: A Griffin segreant Or gorged with a Ducal Coronet Argent beaked and legged of the last
- Motto: Sic Donec

Scroop, 1st Duke of Bridgewater (1681–1745), the son of the 2nd Earl of Bridgewater, was created a duke in 1720. He was the great-grandson of John Egerton, 1st Earl of Bridgewater (cr. 1617; d. 1649), whose name is associated with the production of Milton's Comus and the latter was the son of Sir Thomas Egerton (1540–1617), Queen Elizabeth's Lord Keeper and James I's Lord Chancellor, who was created Baron Ellesmere in 1603 and Viscount Brackley in 1616.

Ancestors of Francis Egerton, 3rd Duke of Bridgewater

8. John Egerton, 2nd Earl of Bridgewater
4. John Egerton, 3rd Earl of Bridgewater
9. Lady Elizabeth Cavendish
2. Scroop Egerton, 1st Duke of Bridgewater
10. Charles Paulet, 1st Duke of Bolton
5. Lady Jane Paulet
11. Mary Scrope
1. Francis Egerton, 3rd Duke of Bridgewater
12. William Russell, Lord Russell
6. Wriothesley Russell, 2nd Duke of Bedford
13. Lady Rachel Wriothesley
3. Lady Rachel Russel
14. John Howland
7. Elizabeth Howland
15. Elizabeth Child

== Notes ==
Peerage of Great Britain
Preceded by John Egerton	Duke of Bridgewater; 1748–1803	Extinct
Peerage of England
Preceded by John Egerton	Earl of Bridgewater; 2nd creation 1748–1803	Succeeded by John William Egerton
