= John Egerton, 2nd Duke of Bridgewater =

Arms of Egerton: Argent, a lion rampant gules between three pheons sable

John Egerton, 2nd Duke of Bridgwater (29 April 1727 – 26 February 1748), known as Lord John Egerton until 1731 and as Marquess of Brackley from 1731 to 1745, was a British peer from the Egerton family. He was also known as the 5th Earl of Bridgewater from 1745 to 1748.

Egerton was the fourth son of Scroop Egerton, 1st Duke of Bridgewater and his second wife Lady Rachael Russell, daughter of Wriothesley Russell, 2nd Duke of Bedford. His older brothers having predeceased him, he succeeded his father as duke in 1745.

Only three years later Egerton died intestate, aged only 20, from a fever and was buried in Little Gaddesden in Hertfordshire on 4 March 1748. He was unmarried and was succeeded in his titles by his younger and only surviving brother Lord Francis Egerton.

Peerage of Great Britain
Preceded by Scroop Egerton	Duke of Bridgewater; 1745–1748	Succeeded by Francis Egerton
