= Art medallion =

Art medallions are a primitive art form said to have been first introduced in Ancient Rome chiefly to display portrait effigies of noted persons such as kings and queens. Most art medallions were hand cast in bronze or similar metal alloys, and slowly found their way into monetary coinage using a struck method of casting. The art form has continued into the 21st century.

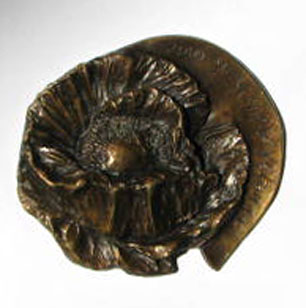
Year of the Veteran Medallion by Christian Corbet, 2006.

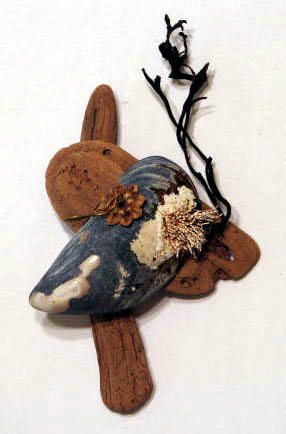
Sea Earth Entanglement by Christian Corbet, 2006.

== Renaissance era ==
Pisanello (Antonio Pisano) (c.1395-1455?) is noted as the first artist to have brought the fine art of art medallions to the forefront of the visual arts. He is noted as arguably the greatest portrait medallist of the Renaissance era for his attention to detail, precision and clarity.

== Modern era ==
From the 17th-19th century, the art medallion grew in popularity, often being cast in other materials other than bronze such as copper, gold, silver and plaster/chalk. Plaster/chalk was bonded in a metal material and used as souvenirs from the mid to late Victorian era, and often depicted mythological scenes.

By the 20th century interest in the hand cast art medallion started to wane in Western art and more interest was focused on the struck medallion where several copies could be made by a mechanical method. However, by the mid-1930s, a slight resurgence took place in the visual arts for the hand cast art medallion, in particular in North America, and artists started to acknowledge this form of sculpture as being a legitimate art form and not merely a craft, as previously recognized.

By the late 20th century Canadian artists such as Emanuel Hahn, Elizabeth Wyn Wood, Walter Allward, Dora de Pedery Hunt (b. 1913), and Elizabeth Bradford Holbrook (b. 1913-2009), helped keep the craft alive.

Today, unlike North America where it is waning, the hand cast art medallion is thriving in Europe.

== See also ==
- Medallion (disambiguation)
- Medal
- Shell gorget
- Coin
