= William Villiers, 3rd Earl of Jersey =

British magistrate

The Right Honourable The Earl of Jersey

Earl of Jersey
- In office 1721–1769
- Preceded by: William Villiers, 2nd Earl of Jersey
- Succeeded by: George Villiers

Viscount Grandison
- In office 1766–1769
- Preceded by: John Villiers (1st creation)
- Succeeded by: George Villiers

Personal details
- Born: William Villiers
- Died: 28 August 1769
- Spouse: Anne Russell, Dowager Duchess of Bedford
- Children: Frederick William Villiers, Viscount Villiers; George Bussy Villiers, 4th Earl of Jersey
- Parent(s): William Villiers, 2nd Earl of Jersey; Judith Herne
- Occupation: Politician

William Villiers, 3rd Earl of Jersey, PC (died 28 August 1769) was a British magistrate from the Villiers family.

== Early life ==
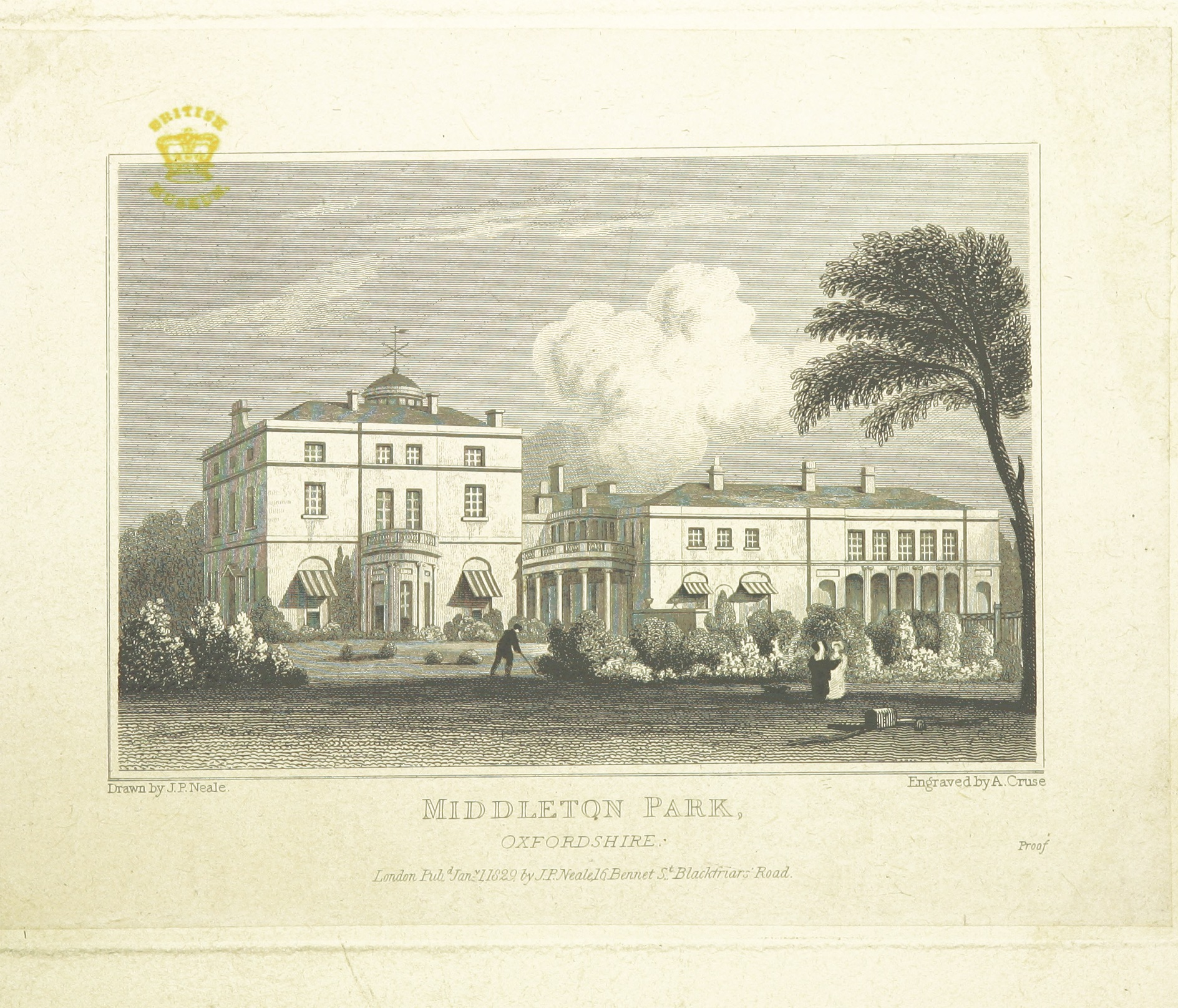
Middleton Park c. 1830

He was the son of William Villiers, 2nd Earl of Jersey, and the former Judith Herne (a daughter of Frederick Herne). Among his siblings were Lady Barbara Villiers (who married Sir William Blackett, 2nd Baronet, and, after his death, Bussy Mansell, 4th Baron Mansell), and Thomas Villiers, 1st Earl of Clarendon.

His paternal grandparents were Edward Villiers, 1st Earl of Jersey, and the former Barbara Chiffinch (a daughter of William Chiffinch).

== Career ==
Among other achievements, Villiers was a founding Governor of the Foundling Hospital, a charity which received its royal charter on 17 October 1739 to operate an orphanage for abandoned children in London.

He commissioned the building of the previous Middleton Park, in Middleton Stoney, Oxfordshire.

== Personal life ==
He was an infatuated admirer of Ann Thicknesse (aka Anne Ford) and he offered her £800 a year to be his mistress. When she refused, Lord Jersey tried to sabotage her initial public concert, but she earned £15 from it nonetheless. In 1761, she published a pamphlet, A Letter from Miss F—d to a Person of Distinction, defending her position. This in turn provoked a pamphlet from the Earl, A Letter to Miss F–d.

=== Marriage ===
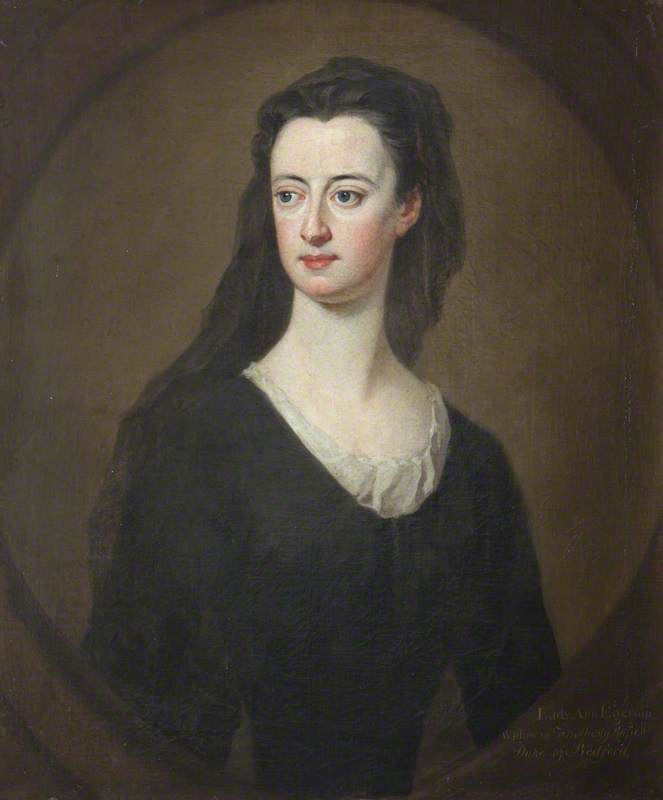
Portrait of Anne by Godfrey Kneller

On 23 June 1733, he married Anne Russell, Dowager Duchess of Bedford (c. 1704/1709 – 1762). She was the daughter of Scroop Egerton, 1st Duke of Bridgewater, and widow of Wriothesley Russell, 3rd Duke of Bedford. They had two sons, but only one survived them:

- Frederick William Villiers, Viscount Villiers (1734–1742), who died in childhood.
- George Bussy Villiers, 4th Earl of Jersey (1735–1805), who married Frances Twysden and had children. Through George, they are ancestors of Diana, Princess of Wales, and of her sons, Princes William, the Prince of Wales, and Harry, Duke of Sussex.

Lady Jersey died on 16 June 1762. Lord Jersey, died seven years later on 28 August 1769.

Legal offices
Preceded by The Lord Cornwallis	Justice in Eyre south of the Trent; 1740 – 1746	Succeeded by The Earl of Halifax
Peerage of England
Preceded by William Villiers	Earl of Jersey; 1721 – 1769	Succeeded by George Villiers
Peerage of Ireland
Preceded by John Villiers	Viscount Grandison; 1st creation 1766 – 1769	Succeeded by George Villiers
