= Nathaniel Cholmley =

British Member of Parliament

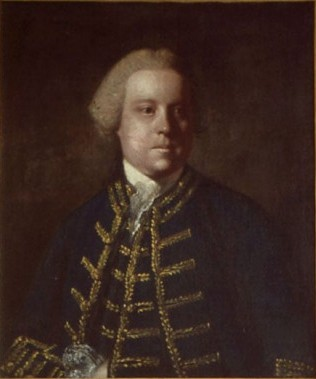
Nathaniel Cholmley, 1762 portrait

Nathaniel Cholmley (15 November 1721 – 11 March 1791) was a British Member of Parliament.

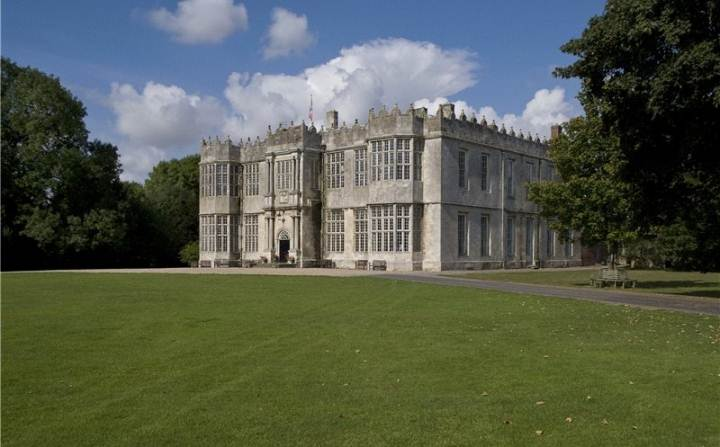
Howsham Hall, North Yorkshire

== Life ==
He was the son of Hugh Cholmley MP and his wife Catherine, the daughter of Sir John Wentworth, 1st Bt.

He was selected High Sheriff of Yorkshire for 1754–55.

He was elected to Parliament for the constituency of Aldborough from 1756 to 1768 and for Boroughbridge from 1768 to 1774.

He commissioned the remodelling of his seat at Howsham Hall in North Yorkshire, employing Capability Brown to lay out the parkland.

== Family ==
Cholmley married three times; firstly in 1750, Catherine, the daughter of Sir Rowland Winn, 4th Baronet of Nostell Priory, Yorkshire, with whom he had two daughters; secondly, in 1757, Henrietta Catherine, daughter of Stephen Croft of Stillington, Yorkshire who gave him a son and two daughters and thirdly, in 1774, Anne Jesse, daughter of Leonard Smelt of Langton, Yorkshire.
