= Scroop Egerton, 1st Duke of Bridgewater =

British courtier and landowner (1681–1744)

His Grace The Duke of Bridgewater
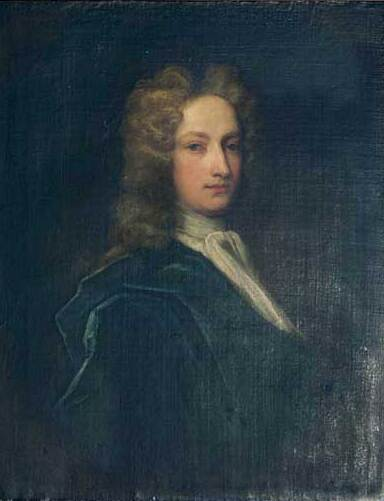
- Portrait by Charles Jervas, 1710
- Born: 11 August 1681
- Died: 11 January 1744 (aged 62)
- Education: Whitgift School
- Spouses: Lady Elizabeth Churchill (m. 1703; died 1714) Lady Rachael Russell (m. 1722)
- Children: John Egerton, Viscount Brackley; Anne Russell, Duchess of Bedford; Louisa Leveson-Gower, Marchioness of Stafford; Lady Caroline Egerton; Charles Egerton, Marquess of Brackley; John Egerton, 2nd Duke of Bridgewater; Lord William Egerton; Diana Calvert, Baroness Baltimore; Francis Egerton, 3rd Duke of Bridgewater
- Parent(s): John Egerton, 3rd Earl of Bridgewater; Lady Jane Paulet

Scroop Egerton, 1st Duke of Bridgewater (11 August 1681 – 11 January 1744), styled as Viscount Brackley from 1687 to 1701 and as the Earl of Bridgewater from 1701 to 1720, was a British courtier and landowner. Born into the Egerton family, he succeeded as Earl of Bridgewater in 1701, before being created Duke of Bridgewater on 18 June 1720, with subsidiary titles including Marquess of Brackley.

== Early life ==
Egerton arms: Argent a Lion rampant Gules between three Pheons Sable

Scroop Egerton was born on 11 August 1681, the third son of John Egerton, 3rd Earl of Bridgewater, and his second wife, Lady Jane Paulet. His maternal grandparents were Charles Paulet, 1st Duke of Bolton, and his second wife, Mary Scrope, natural daughter of Emanuel Scrope, 1st Earl of Sunderland. Egerton is recorded as being educated at the Whitgift School, Croydon.

== Career ==
Bridgewater, a Whig, served twice as Lord Lieutenant of Buckinghamshire, first from 1702 to 1711 (during the reign of Queen Anne) and later again from 1714 to 1728 (the reigns of George I and George II).

Bridgewater first saw royal service when appointed to the household of Prince George of Denmark as Gentleman of the Bedchamber and Master of the Horse. Later, he served as Lord Chamberlain to Caroline, Princess of Wales, and subsequently as Lord of the Bedchamber to her husband, who had by then acceded to the throne as King George II.

Scroop Egerton commissioned the building of Brackley's new Town Hall in 1704, and it was completed in 1706. He was the lord of the manor, and also Lord Lieutenant of Buckinghamshire at this time.

== Family life ==
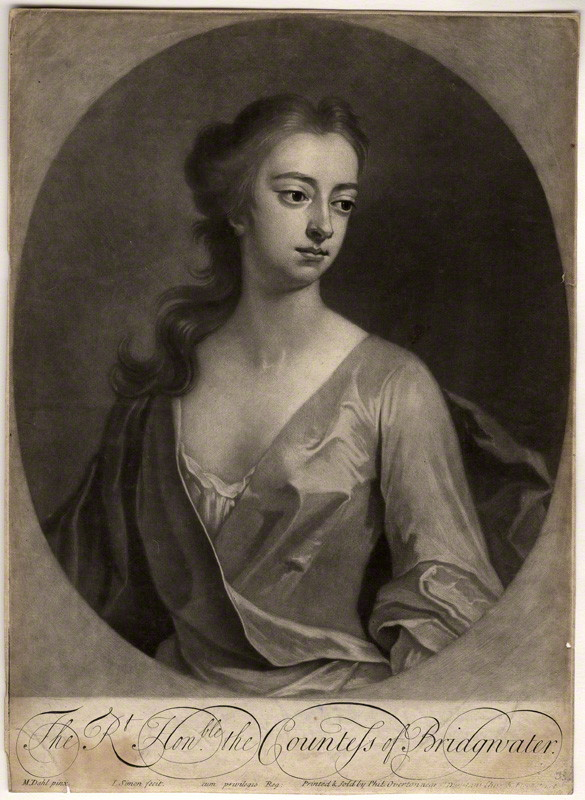
Elizabeth, Lady Egerton by John Simon, c.1703

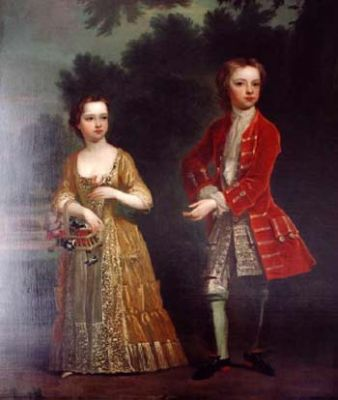
Lady Anne and John Egerton, Viscount Brackley; painted by Charles Jervas, 1716

On 9 February 1703, Bridgewater married his first wife, Lady Elizabeth Churchill, daughter of John Churchill, 1st Duke of Marlborough, and the former Sarah Jenyns. Although Elizabeth's mother The Duchess of Marlborough thought him a "fool", Elizabeth and Bridgewater had an idyllically happy married life. The couple had two children:

- John Egerton, Viscount Brackley (b. 1703/4, d. 1718/9) died at age 14 at Eton College, Windsor, Berkshire, England. He was buried on 5 February 1718/19 at Little Gaddesden, Hertfordshire, England. He was styled as Viscount Brackley between 1704 and 1719.
- Lady Anne Egerton (d. 1762); married first Wriothesley Russell, 3rd Duke of Bedford, and, secondly William Villiers, 3rd Earl of Jersey. Through Anne, they are ancestors of Diana, Princess of Wales, and of her sons, Princes William, the Prince of Wales, and Harry, Duke of Sussex.

The Countess of Bridgewater died on 22 March 1714. About eight years later, on 4 August 1722, Bridgewater married his second wife, Lady Rachael, daughter of Wriothesley Russell, 2nd Duke of Bedford, and Elizabeth née Howland. The couple had eight children:

- Lady Louisa Egerton (30 April 1723 – 14 March 1761); married Granville Leveson-Gower, 1st Marquess of Stafford.
- Lady Caroline Egerton (b. 21 May 1724).
- Charles Egerton, Marquess of Brackley (27 July 1725 – 2 May 1731).
- John Egerton, 2nd Duke of Bridgewater (29 April 1727 – 26 February 1748).
- Lord William Egerton (15 January 1728 – 10 February 1729).
- Lord Thomas Egerton (18 April 1730 – 1 May 1730).
- Lady Diana Egerton (3 March 1731/2 – 13 August 1758); married Frederick Calvert, 6th Baron Baltimore on 9 March 1753. The union was not a success, and the couple spent most of their married life apart. They had no children, and in May 1756 they were formally separated, due to an "incompatibility of temper". In 1758, Lady Diana "died from a hurt she received by a fall out of a Phaethon carriage", while accompanied by her husband. Although Lord Baltimore was suspected of foul play, no charges were ever brought.
- Francis Egerton, 3rd Duke of Bridgewater (21 May 1736 – 8 March 1803).

== See also ==
- Egerton family
- Manchester Coalfield
- Peerage of Great Britain

Court offices
New title	Lord Chamberlain to Caroline, Princess of Wales; 1714–1717	Succeeded by The Earl of Grantham
Honorary titles
Preceded by The Viscount Newhaven	Lord Lieutenant of Buckinghamshire; 1703–1711	Succeeded by The Duke of Kent
Preceded by The Viscount Newhaven	Lord Lieutenant of Buckinghamshire; 1714–1728	Succeeded by The Viscount Cobham
Peerage of England
Preceded by John Egerton	Earl of Bridgewater; 2nd creation 1701–1744	Succeeded by John Egerton
Peerage of Great Britain
New creation	Duke of Bridgewater; 1720–1744	Succeeded by John Egerton
