= Wriothesley Russell, 2nd Duke of Bedford =

English duke (1680–1711)

His Grace The Duke of Bedford KG
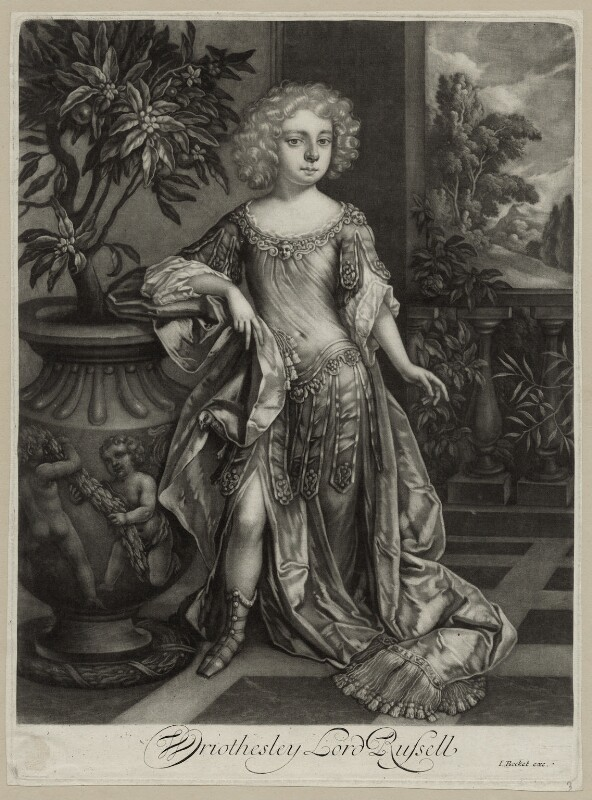
- Tenure: 7 September 1700 – 26 May 1711
- Successor: Wriothesley Russell, 3rd Duke
- Other titles: 2nd Marquess of Tavistock; 6th Earl of Bedford; 6th Baron Russell; 4th Baron Russell of Thornhaugh; 2nd Baron Howland
- Born: 1 November 1680
- Died: 26 May 1711 (aged 30)
- Spouse: Elizabeth Howland
- Issue: William Russell (Aug–Dec 1703); William Russell (b. 1704); Rachael Russell; Wriothesley Russell; John Russell; Elizabeth Russell
- Parents: William Russell, Lord Russell; Rachel Wriothesley

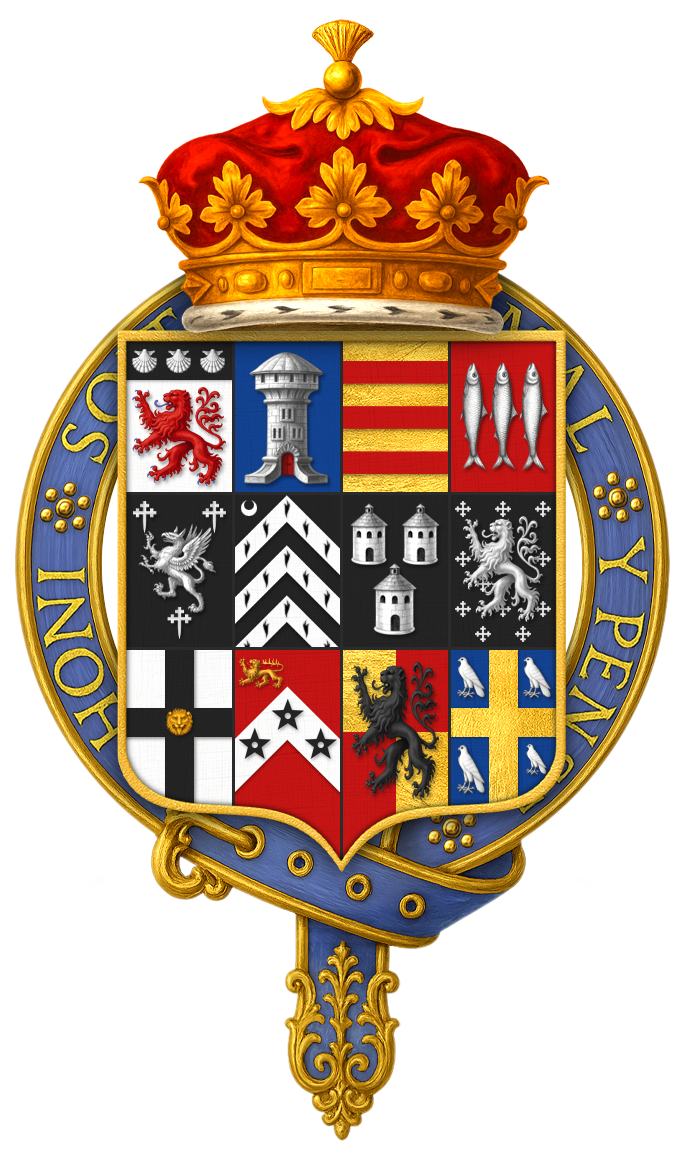
Quartered arms of Wriothesley Russell, 2nd Duke of Bedford, KG

Wriothesley Russell, 2nd Duke of Bedford KG (1 November 1680 – 26 May 1711) was an English nobleman and Tory politician. He was the son of William Russell, Lord Russell, and his wife Lady Rachel Wriothesley. From 1683 until 1694, he was styled Lord Russell, and from 1695 until his accession in 1700, Marquess of Tavistock.

Russell married the rich heiress Elizabeth Howland, daughter of John Howland of Streatham, on 23 May 1695. Shortly thereafter (13 June 1695), his grandfather, the Duke of Bedford, was created Baron Howland of Streatham to commemorate the marriage. The couple had six children:

- William Russell, Marquess of Tavistock (13 August 1703 – December 1703)
- William Russell, Marquess of Tavistock (1704 – c. May 1707)
- Lady Rachael Russell (c. 1707–1777), married Scroop Egerton, 1st Duke of Bridgewater, as her first husband, and had issue. She was widowed on 11 January 1744. On 14 December 1745, at St James, Westminster, she married her second husband, Lt-General Sir Richard Lyttelton, KB.
- Wriothesley Russell, 3rd Duke of Bedford (1708–1732)
- John Russell, 4th Duke of Bedford (1710–1771)
- Lady Elizabeth Russell (1704–1784), married William Capell, 3rd Earl of Essex, and had issue.

On 13 May 1696, Tavistock, as he then was, matriculated at Magdalen College, Oxford. Around 1698, he began the construction of the Howland Great Wet Dock on the Thames, on some of his wife's dowry lands in Rotherhithe.

Russell held the offices of Lord Lieutenant of Cambridgeshire, Bedfordshire and Middlesex between 1701 and 1711. He was also a Gentleman of the Bedchamber to William III from 1701 to 1702. After William's death, he was invested as a Knight of the Garter on 14 March 1702 and served as Lord High Constable of England for the coronation of Queen Anne. He was a board member of the High Tory Loyal Brotherhood.

Russell died in 1711, aged 30, from smallpox and was buried on 30 May 1711 in the 'Bedford Chapel' at St. Michael's Church at Chenies, Buckinghamshire.

Honorary titles
Preceded by Lord Edward Russell	Lord Lieutenant of Bedfordshire; 1701–1711	Succeeded by The Duke of Kent
Preceded by Lord Edward Russell	Lord Lieutenant of Cambridgeshire; 1701–1711	Succeeded by The Lord North
Preceded by Lord Edward Russell	Lord Lieutenant of Middlesex; 1701–1711	Succeeded by The Duke of Buckingham and Normanby
Preceded by Lord Edward Russell	Custos Rotulorum of Middlesex; 1701–1711	Succeeded by The Duke of Buckingham and Normanby
Vacant Title last held by The Duke of Ormonde	Lord High Constable of England; 1702	Vacant Title next held by The Duke of Montagu
Peerage of England
Preceded by William Russell	Duke of Bedford; 1700–1711	Succeeded by Wriothesley Russell
