= Wriothesley Russell, 3rd Duke of Bedford =

English nobleman and peer

The Duke of Bedford
- Duke of Bedford
- Arms of the Duke of Bedford
- Tenure: 26 May 1711 – 23 October 1732
- Successor: John Russell, 4th Duke of Bedford
- Other titles: 3rd Marquess of Tavistock; 7th Earl of Bedford; 7th Baron Russell; 5th Baron Russell of Thornhaugh; 3rd Baron Howland
- Born: 25 May 1708
- Died: 23 October 1732 (aged 24)
- Spouse(s): Lady Anne Egerton
- Parents: Wriothesley Russell, 2nd Duke of Bedford; Elizabeth Howland

Wriothesley Russell, 3rd Duke of Bedford (25 May 1708 – 23 October 1732) was an English nobleman and peer. He was the son of Wriothesley Russell, 2nd Duke of Bedford. He was marginally involved in the politics of Hanoverian Succession.

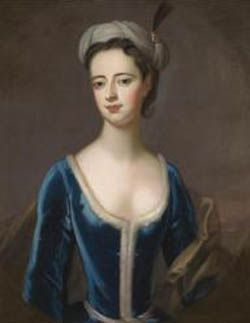
Lady Anne Egerton by Enoch Seeman

Russell married his sister's stepdaughter, Lady Anne Egerton, daughter of Scroop Egerton, 1st Duke of Bridgwater, on 22 April 1725. Russell courted Egerton, trying to get Sarah Churchill, Queen Anne's famous favourite, as a go-between, for political reasons, as he has opposed Walpole.

He died in 1732, aged 24 at Corunna, Spain, without issue. He was buried on 14 December 1732 in the 'Bedford Chapel' at St. Michael's Church, Chenies, Buckinghamshire, and his titles passed to his brother, John Russell, 4th Duke of Bedford.

It has been suggested that his marriage had been "purely for show." His widow re-married, had offspring, and ultimately became an ancestor of Diana, Princess of Wales, and thus William, Prince of Wales. In any case, it was clearly more of a marriage about politics, than sex or love.

Peerage of England
Preceded by William Russell	Duke of Bedford; 1711–1732	Succeeded by John Russell
