= 1913 in literature =

This article contains information about the literary events and publications of 1913.

== Events ==
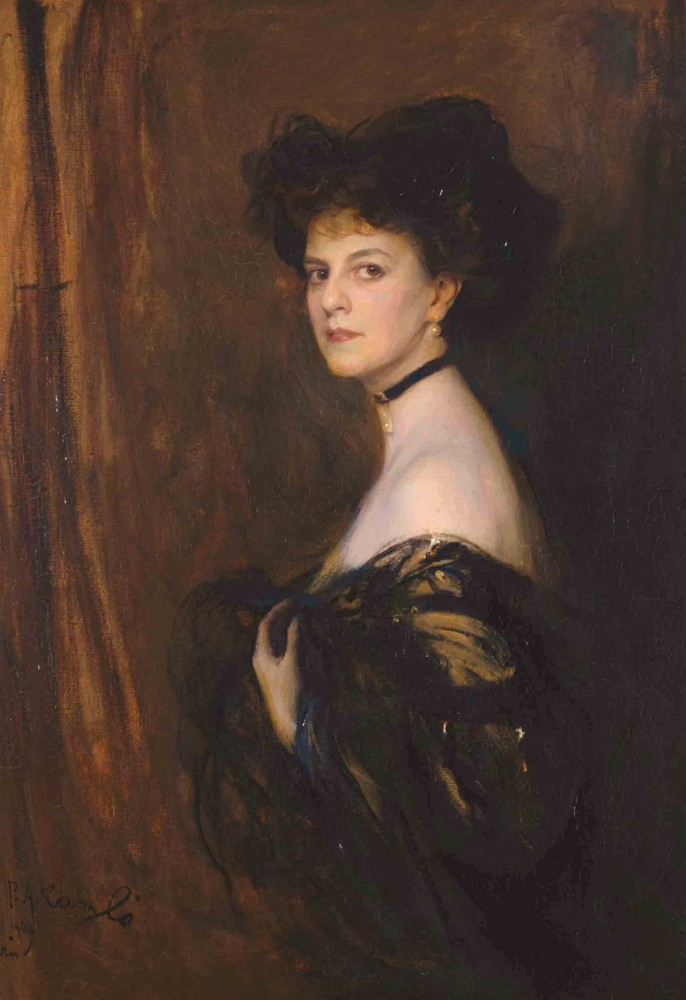
Élisabeth, Countess Greffulhe (1905), by Philip de László, who served as the model for the character of the Duchesse de Guermantes in In Search of Lost Time

- January – Acmeist poetry, with roots back to 1909, is officially born as a reaction to Russian Futurism. Manifestos are printed in the journal Apollon by Nikolay Gumilyov and Sergey Gorodetsky, with illustrative works by both, and by Anna Akhmatova, Vladimir Narbut, and Osip Mandelstam — the last with "Hagia Sophia".
- January 1 – The German National Library is founded in Leipzig.
- January 8 – Harold Monro officially opens the Poetry Bookshop in London (opened for business November 1912), which becomes a noted international literary meeting-place.
- January 24 – Franz Kafka stops working on his novel Amerika., which he never finishes.
- March 24 – The new Palace Theatre opens at 1564 Broadway (at West 47th Street) in midtown Manhattan, New York City.
- April 5 – Serialization of the adventures of Gaston Leroux's character Chéri-Bibi begins in Le Matin.
- April – Bernhard Kellermann's novel The Tunnel sells 100,000 copies in its first six months.
- c. April – Humphrey S. Milford becomes publisher to the University of Oxford and head of the London operations of Oxford University Press, after the retirement of Henry Frowde.
- September – F. Scott Fitzgerald enters Princeton University, where he meets Edmund Wilson and John Peale Bishop.
- November 8 – Georg Büchner's play Woyzeck, unfinished on his death in 1837, receives its first performance, at the Residenztheater, Munich.
- November 13 – Marcel Proust's Swann's Way (Du côté de chez Swann), volume 1 of In Search of Lost Time (À la recherche du temps perdu), is published by Éditions Grasset in Paris at the author's expense.
- December 21 – Arthur Wynne's "word-cross", the first crossword puzzle, appears in the New York World.
- December 26 – Ambrose Bierce, an observer with Pancho Villa's army in the Mexican Revolution, sends his last known correspondence. He is never seen again.
- unknown dates
  - Zaynab, by Husayn Haykal, is published; it is sometimes called the first modern Arabic novel.
  - Norbert von Hellingrath begins publishing his edition of Friedrich Hölderlin's complete works (Sämtliche Werke: historisch-kritische Ausgabe, the "Berliner Ausgabe"), restoring it to literary prominence.
  - Henri Stahl publishes excerpts from his novel Un român în lună ("A Romanian on the Moon", republished as a book in 1914), one of the earliest works of Romanian science fiction.

== New books ==
=== Fiction ===
- Alain-Fournier – Le Grand Meaulnes
- Maurice Barrès – The Sacred Hill
- Andrei Bely – Petersburg (Петербургъ, Peterburg) - Serialization concludes in March 1914
- Arnold Bennett – The Regent
- E. F. Benson
  - Dodo's Daughter
  - Thorley Weir
  - The Weaker Vessel
- Edmund Clerihew Bentley – Trent's Last Case
- Algernon Blackwood – A Prisoner in Fairyland
- Victor Bridges – Another Man's Shoes
- Ivana Brlić-Mažuranić – The Brave Adventures of Lapitch (Čudnovate zgode šegrta Hlapića)
- Mary Grant Bruce – Norah of Billabong
- John Buchan – The Power-House (serialization)
- Edgar Rice Burroughs – The Return of Tarzan
- Hall Caine – The Woman Thou Gavest Me
- Ethel Carnie – Miss Nobody
- Willa Cather – O Pioneers!
- Joseph Conrad – Chance (book publication)
- Miguel de Unamuno – El espejo de la muerte (The Mirror of Death, stories)
- Grazia Deledda – Canne al vento (Reeds in the Wind)
- Ethel M. Dell – The Knave of Diamonds
- Arthur Conan Doyle – The Poison Belt
- Roger Martin du Gard – Jean Barois
- Edna Ferber – Roast Beef, Medium
- Ellen Glasgow – Virginia
- Elinor Glyn
  - The Sequence
  - The Contrast and Other Stories
- Frances Nimmo Greene — The Right of the Strongest
- Knut Hamsun – Børn av Tiden
- Husayn Haykal – Zaynab
- Franz Hessel – Der Kramladen des Glücks
- Robert Hichens – The Way of Ambition
- Henry James – A Small Boy and Others
- Annie Fellows Johnston – Miss Santa Clause of the Pullman
- Mary Johnston – Hagar
- Bernhard Kellermann – Der Tunnel
- Valery Larbaud – A. O. Barnabooth
- D. H. Lawrence – Sons and Lovers
- Gaston Leroux – The Secret of the Night
- Jack London
  - The Valley of the Moon
  - The Abysmal Brute
- Marie Belloc Lowndes
  - The End of Her Honeymoon
  - The Lodger
- Arnold Lunn – The Harrovians
- Compton Mackenzie – Sinister Street, vol. 1
- Katherine Mansfield – "Millie" (short story)
- Patricio Mariano – Ang Tala sa Panghulo (The Bright Star at Panghulo)
- Flora Mayor – The Third Miss Symons
- Oscar Micheaux – Conquest: The Story of a Negro Pioneer
- Octave Mirbeau – Dingo
- Lucy Maud Montgomery – The Golden Road
- Mori Ōgai (森 鷗外) – The Wild Geese (雁, Gan, serialization concludes December)
- E. Phillips Oppenheim – The Double Life of Mr. Alfred Burton
- Baroness Orczy – Eldorado
- Luigi Pirandello – I vecchi e i giovani (The Old and the Young, complete)
- N. Porsenna – La judecata Zeilor (A Tribunal of Gods)
- Marcel Proust – Swann's Way (Du côté de chez Swann, first part of À la Recherche du temps perdu)
- Sax Rohmer – The Mystery of Dr. Fu-Manchu
- Saki – When William Came
- Ewald Gerhard Seeliger – Peter Voss, Thief of Millions
- Gene Stratton-Porter – Laddie
- Booth Tarkington – The Flirt
- Vincent Cartwright Vickers – The Google Book
- Edgar Wallace
  - The Fourth Plague
  - Grey Timothy
  - The River of Stars
- Hugh Walpole – Fortitude
- Mary Augusta Ward
  - The Coryston Family
  - The Mating of Lydia
- Edith Wharton – The Custom of the Country
- P. G. Wodehouse – The Little Nugget
- Leonard Woolf – The Village in the Jungle
- Francis Brett Young – Undergrowth

=== Children and young people ===
- L. Frank Baum
  - The Patchwork Girl of Oz
  - Little Wizard Stories of Oz
  - Aunt Jane's Nieces on the Ranch (as Edith Van Dyne)
- Ivana Brlić-Mažuranić – The Brave Adventures of Lapitch (Čudnovate zgode šegrta Hlapića)
- Gertrude Minnie Faulding – Fairies
- Ferenc Móra – Csilicsali Csalavári Csalavér (nonsense title, about a wolf family)
- E. Nesbit – Wet Magic
- Eleanor H. Porter – Pollyanna
- Beatrix Potter – The Tale of Pigling Bland
- Else Ury – Nesthäkchen and Her Dolls (Nesthäkchen und ihre Puppen)

=== Drama ===
- Franz Arnold and Ernst Bach – The Spanish Fly (Die spanische Fliege)
- Jacinto Benavente – The Unloved Woman (La malquerida)
- Arnold Bennett – The Great Adventure
- George A. Birmingham – General John Regan
- G. K. Chesterton – Magic
- Montague Glass and Charles Klein – Potash and Perlmutter
- A. de Herz
  - Păianjenul (The Spider)
  - Bunicul (Grandfather)
- Stanley Houghton
  - The Perfect Cure
  - Trust the People
- Victor Ido – Karinda Adinda
- D. H. Lawrence – The Daughter-in-Law (first performed 1967)
- Oskar Luts – Kapsapea (The Cabbage)
- Gregorio Martínez Sierra
  - Mamá (Mama)
  - Sólo para mujeres (For Women Only)
- Vladimir Mayakovsky – Vladimir Mayakovsky («Владимир Маяковский»)
- Edward Sheldon – Romance
- Carl Sternheim – Bürger Schippel (Citizen Schippel)

=== Poetry ===
- Delmira Agustini – Los Cálices Vacíos (Empty Chalices)
- Guillaume Apollinaire – Alcools
- James Elroy Flecker – The Golden Journey to Samarkand
- Robert Frost – A Boy's Will
- Osip Mandelstam – Hagia Sophia
- Siegfried Sassoon – The Daffodil Murderer
- Georg Trakl – Gedichte (Poems)

=== Non-fiction ===
- Guillaume Apollinaire – The Cubist Painters, Aesthetic Meditations (Les Peintres Cubistes, Méditations Esthétiques)
- Miguel de Unamuno – Del sentimiento trágico de la vida (The Tragic Sense of Life)
- Sigmund Freud – Totem und Tabu
- Maxim Gorky – My Childhood (Детство)
- Élie Halévy – Histoire du peuple anglais au XIXe siècle (vol. 1)
- Holbrook Jackson – The Eighteen Nineties
- Walter Lippmann – A Preface to Politics
- Luigi Russolo – The Art of Noises (L'arte dei rumori, Futurist manifesto)
- Rosa Luxemburg – Die Akkumulation des Kapitals (The Accumulation of Capital, 1951)
- Alfred North Whitehead and Bertrand Russell – Principia Mathematica (completed)
- Basil Williams – The Life of William Pitt, Earl of Chatham

== Births ==
- January 23 – Joan Adeney Easdale, English poet (died 1998)
- January 29 – Peter von Zahn, German journalist and writer (died 2001)
- February 2 – Racey Helps, English children's writer and illustrator (died 1970)
- February 26 – George Barker, British poet (died 1991)
- February 27
  - T. B. Ilangaratne, Sri Lankan author, dramatist, actor and politician (died 1992)
  - Irwin Shaw, American playwright, screenwriter and novelist (died 1984)
- March 2 – Godfried Bomans, Dutch writer (died 1971)
- April 18 – Muttathu Varkey, Malayalam novelist, short story writer, and poet (died 1989)
- May 18 – Nicolás Gómez Dávila, Colombian philosopher and aphorist (died 1994)
- June 22 – Sándor Weöres, Hungarian poet and author (died 1989)
- June 26 – Aimé Césaire, Martinique writer (died 2008)
- July 6 – Gwyn Thomas, Welsh novelist (died 1981)
- July 21 – Catherine Storr, English children's writer (died 2001)
- August 5 – Edilberto K. Tiempo, Filipino novelist and literary critic (died 2013)
- August 11 – Angus Wilson, English novelist (died 1991)
- August 28 – Robertson Davies, Canadian novelist (died 1995)
- October 19 – Vasco Pratolini, Italian writer (died 1991)
- November 7 – Albert Camus, French writer (died 1960)
- November 10 – Karl Shapiro, American poet (died 2000)
- December 26 – Elizabeth David (née Gwynne), English cookery writer (died 1992)
- December 27 – Elizabeth Smart, Canadian poet and novelist (died 1986)

== Deaths ==
- January 21 – Aluísio Azevedo, Brazilian novelist, playwright and short story writer (born 1857)
- February 9 – Oscar Méténier, French novelist and dramatist (born 1859)
- February 13 – Charles Major, American novelist (born 1856)
- March 7 – Pauline Johnson, Canadian poet (born 1861)
- March 13
  - Thomas Krag, Norwegian novelist, dramatist and short story writer (born 1868)
  - Jane Marsh Parker, American novelist and religious writer (born 1836)
- April 4 – Edward Dowden, Irish critic and poet (born 1843)
- May 8 – Charlotte Louisa Hawkins Dempster, Scottish novelist and essayist (born 1835)
- June 2 – Alfred Austin, English poet and Poet Laureate (born 1835)
- June 13 – Camille Lemonnier, Belgian poet and journalist (born 1844)
- July 8 – Louis Hémon, French novelist (rail accident, born 1880)
- July 16 — Esther Saville Allen, American author (b. 1837)
- October 9 – D. Iacobescu, Romanian poet (born 1893)
- October 19 – Emily Lawless, Irish-born modernist novelist and poet (born 1845)
- November 26 – Frances Julia Wedgwood, English feminist novelist, biographer and critic (born 1833)
- December 1 – Juhan Liiv, Estonian poet and short story writer (born 1864)
- December 5 – Ferdinand Dugué, French poet and playwright (born 1816)
- December 11 – Ioan Kalinderu, Romanian classical scholar, jurist and agriculturalist (born 1840)

== Awards ==
- Nobel Prize for Literature: Rabindranath Tagore
- Newdigate prize: Maurice Roy Ridley
