= Newcastle House =

House in Lincoln's Inn Fields, London

Coordinates: 51.5164°N 0.119°W

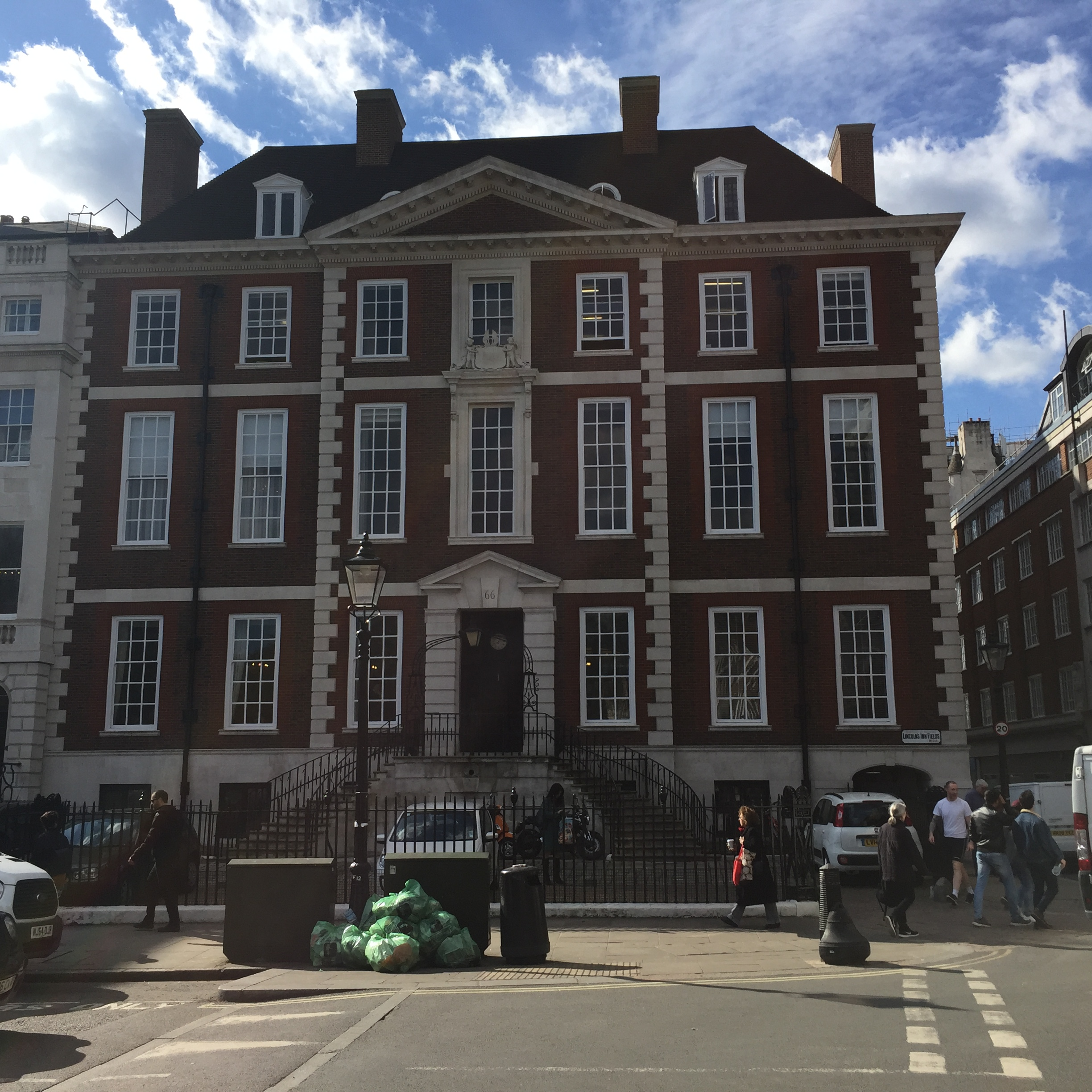
Newcastle House, March 2017

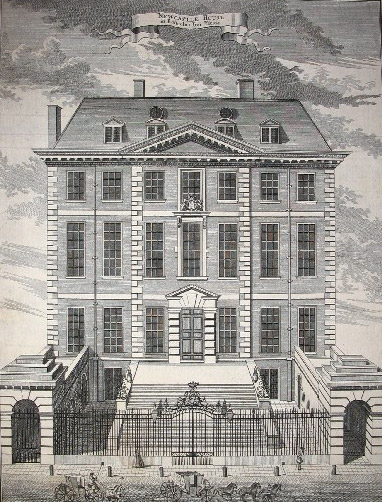
Newcastle House in 1754.

Newcastle House is a mansion in Lincoln's Inn Fields in central London, England. It was one of the two largest houses built in London's largest square during its development in the 17th century, the other being Lindsey House. It is the northernmost house on the western side of the square.

== Seat for the Earls of Carlisle and Marquesses of Powis, reconstruction in 1694 ==
The house had a complex history. The first version was built in 1641-42 for James Hay, 2nd Earl of Carlisle. In 1672 it was purchased by William Herbert, 1st Marquess of Powis and renamed Powis House, but in 1684 it burned down. Reconstruction of a new house – effectively the one which still stands, albeit greatly altered – to designs by Captain William Winde commenced promptly, but in 1688 the house was ransacked by a mob in consequence of Lord Powis's association with the recently deposed James II. The following year Lord Powis's estates were attainted and he fled to France. The house was completed by Christopher Wren in 1694.

== Official residence of the Lord Keeper of the Great Seal ==
Powis House was designated the official residence of the Lord Keeper of the Great Seal. In 1694 the charter of the newly formed Bank of England was sealed there.

== Ownership by the Dukes of Newcastle and alterations ==
By 1705 the house had been returned to the Powis family, and in that year they sold it to John Holles, 1st Duke of Newcastle, who had alterations made by John Vanbrugh. Thereafter it was called Newcastle House. The building was a compact block with three main storeys, plus two storeys of basements below and two storeys of attics above. It was built of brick with bold stone quoins, band courses and cornice. There were two projecting wings to the rear, so a large amount of accommodation was fitted into the compact site.

Holles left the house to his nephew Thomas Pelham-Holles, who was confusingly also created 1st Duke of Newcastle (his uncle's was the second creation, his the third). This latter duke was a prominent politician and latterly Prime Minister of Great Britain. He held court at Newcastle House for several decades and died there in 1768. He used it as his premier London residence throughout his life (preferring it to 10 Downing Street when he was Prime Minister), and threw many lavish parties there which were attended by much of London society.

== Office building for Farrer & Co ==
The Prime Minister was Newcastle House's last aristocratic occupant. His widow Harriet Pelham-Holles, Duchess of Newcastle sold the house to the banker Henry Kendall for £8,400. He had it divided in two and in 1790 one half was purchased by James Farrer. The solicitors Farrer & Co still occupy the building, and in the early 20th century they purchased the other half and reunited the building. Also in the early 1900s, the rear wings were removed in connection with the construction of Kingsway, a major thoroughfare which was driven through the small streets just to the west of Lincoln's Inn Fields. Farrer & Co commissioned alternations by Sir Edwin Lutyens in the 1930s, but the building still retains much of its late 17th and early 18th century fabric and appearance.

== Previous house of the same name in Clerkenwell ==
In the 17th century there was a mansion called Newcastle House in Clerkenwell, which belonged to an earlier Duke of Newcastle.
