= Google Books (disambiguation) =

Google Books is a search engine for published material.

Google Books, Googlebooks, Google Book, or Googlebook may also refer to:

== Technology ==
- Googlebook, a brand of laptops
- Google Play Books, an ebook marketplace

== Books ==
- The Google Book, a children's book

== See also ==
- Chromebook
- Google Bookmarks
- Gemini Notebook
- Google Notebook
- Google Reader
