= James Campbell (potter) =

Scottish artist known for pottery (1943–2019)

- Born: James Campbell; 1943; Cawdor, Nairnshire, Scotland
- Died: 2019
- Education: Royal College of Art
- Known for: Pottery, charcoal and pastel.

James Campbell was a potter, however he also used charcoal and pastels, played the jazz trumpet and wrote poetry.

== Early years ==
Campbell was born in 1942 in Cawdor, Scotland, second son of John Campbell, 5th Earl Cawdor of Castlemartin and Wilma Mairi Vickers, daughter of Vincent Cartwright Vickers (1879-1939), a governor of the Bank of England and a director of Vickers Ltd and author of The Google Book. This may have made a strong impression on James as later he often used birds in his works. James grew up on the family estates in North East Scotland and Stackpole estate in Pembrokeshire, Wales. He attended Eton College where Gordon Baldwin taught ceramics and sculpture. From 1959 the Royal College of Art ran a pilot scheme that involved accepting some students straight from school. After the entrance procedure, he gained a place and graduated in 1964 with a first class diploma.

== Career ==
Soon he was teaching pot making on a foundation course, the students learning disciplines from ceramics to fashion. Now gainfully employed, he set up his first pottery workshop near Ross-on-Wye and started exhibiting his pots. He used different forms of clay: earthenware, stoneware and porcelain. His drawings were often executed in charcoal and colour pastels. In 1973 along with Lucie Rie, Hans Coper, Janet Leach and Ewen Henderson (artist) he exhibited at Tim Boon's Amalgam Gallery, Barnes village, opening exhibition entitled 'Five British Potters'. Campbell was the youngest exhibitor. In 2013 Campbell purchased a 16th-century timber-framed house and studio in Gloucestershire, not far from the site of his earlier workshop, and produced hand-built, individual pieces using a Staffordshire red clay.

== The Google Book ==
He returned to The Google Book in 2019 when he collaborated with the researchers of The Google Book Project. Campbell wrote the foreword to the updated and extended version of his grandfather Vincent Cartwright Vickers' original 1913 book The Google Book. He died aged 77 shortly after the book was published.
