= Thomas Pelham-Holles, 1st Duke of Newcastle =

Prime Minister of Great Britain (1754–1756; 1757–1762)

His Grace The Duke of Newcastle KG PC FRS
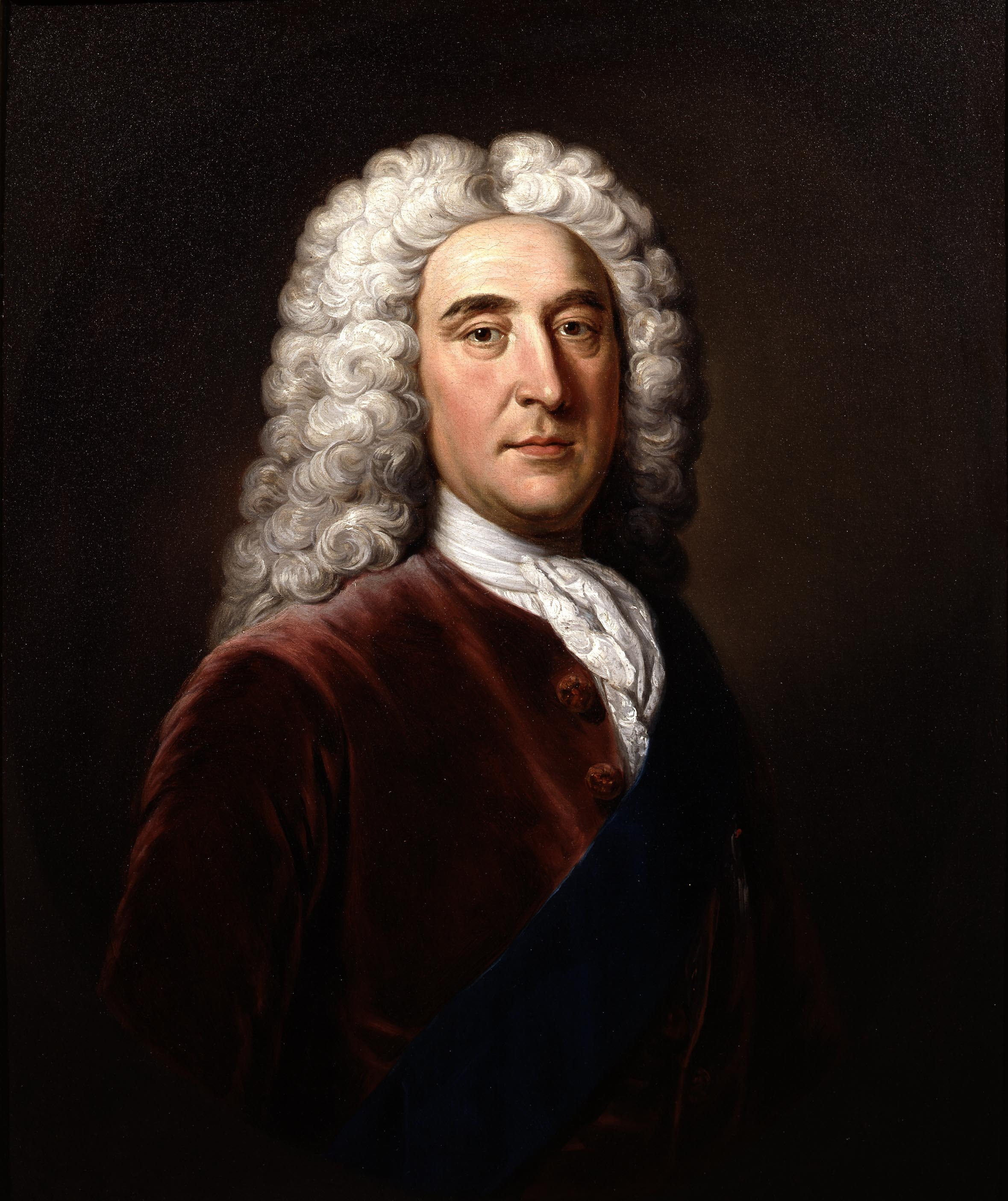
- Portrait by William Hoare, c. 1750

Prime Minister of Great Britain
- In office 29 June 1757 – 26 May 1762
- Monarchs: George II; George III
- Preceded by: The Duke of Devonshire
- Succeeded by: The Earl of Bute
- In office 16 March 1754 – 11 November 1756
- Monarch: George II
- Preceded by: Henry Pelham
- Succeeded by: The Duke of Devonshire
Ministerial offices
Lord Privy Seal
In office 30 July 1765 – 30 July 1766
Monarch	George III
Prime Minister	The Marquess of Rockingham
Preceded by	The Duke of Marlborough
Succeeded by	The Earl of Chatham
Secretary of State for the Northern Department
In office 6 February 1748 – 23 March 1754
Monarch	George II
Prime Minister	Henry Pelham
Preceded by	The Earl of Chesterfield
Succeeded by	The Earl of Holderness
Secretary of State for the Southern Department
In office 6 April 1724 – 12 February 1748
Monarchs	George I George II
Prime Minister	Robert Walpole; The Earl of Wilmington; Henry Pelham
Preceded by	The Lord Carteret
Succeeded by	The Duke of Bedford
Lord Chamberlain
In office 14 April 1717 – 6 April 1724
Monarch	George I
Prime Minister	The Earl Stanhope & The Earl of Sunderland (as chief ministers); Robert Walpole
Preceded by	The Duke of Bolton
Succeeded by	The Duke of Grafton

Personal details
- Born: 21 July 1693 London, England
- Died: 17 November 1768 (aged 75) Lincoln's Inn Fields, England
- Resting place: All Saints Churchyard, Laughton, East Sussex, England
- Party: Whig
- Spouse: Lady Henrietta Godolphin (m. 1717)
- Parent: Thomas Pelham, 1st Baron Pelham (father)
- Education: Clare College, Cambridge

Thomas Pelham-Holles, 1st Duke of Newcastle upon Tyne, 1st Duke of Newcastle-under-Lyne (Note: Newcastle-under-Lyne was commonly used when the title was created although Newcastle-under-Lyme became more usual in the 20th century, however Newcastle-under-Lyne is on the original patent that created the title.) (21 July 1693 – 17 November 1768) was an English Whig statesman who served as Prime Minister of Great Britain, and whose official life extended throughout the Whig supremacy of the 18th century. He is commonly known as the Duke of Newcastle.

A protégé of Robert Walpole, he served under him for more than 20 years until 1742. He held power with his brother, prime minister Henry Pelham, until 1754. He had then served as a Secretary of State continuously for 30 years and dominated British foreign policy.

After Henry's death, Newcastle was prime minister for six years in two separate periods. While his first premiership was not particularly notable, Newcastle precipitated the Seven Years' War, and his weak diplomacy cost him his premiership. After his second term, he served briefly in Lord Rockingham's ministry, before he retired from government. He was most effective as a deputy to a leader of greater ability, such as Walpole, his brother, or Pitt. Few politicians in British history matched his skills and industry in using patronage to maintain power over long stretches of time. His genius appeared as the chief party manager for the Whigs from 1715 to 1761. He used his energy and his money to select candidates, distribute patronage and win elections. He was especially influential in the counties of Sussex, Nottinghamshire, Yorkshire and Lincolnshire. His greatest triumph came in the 1754 election.

Outside the electoral realm, his reputation has suffered. Historian Harry Dickinson says that he became

[n]otorious for his fussiness and fretfulness, his petty jealousies, his reluctance to accept responsibility for his actions, and his inability to pursue any political objective to his own satisfaction or to the nation's profit ... Many modern historians have depicted him as the epitome of unredeemed mediocrity and as a veritable buffoon in office.

== Early life ==
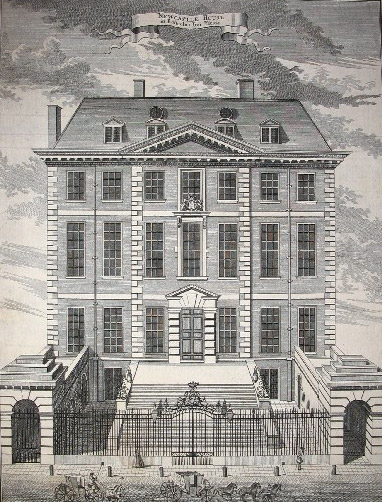
Newcastle House which he inherited from his uncle in 1711, and used as his primary London residence, often throwing lavish parties there.

Thomas Pelham was born in London on 21 July 1693 the eldest son of Thomas Pelham, 1st Baron Pelham, by his second wife, the former Lady Grace Holles, younger sister of John Holles, 1st Duke of Newcastle-upon-Tyne. He studied at Westminster School and was admitted as a fellow commoner at Clare College, Cambridge, in 1710. Pelham's uncle died in 1711, and his father the next year, both leaving their large estates to their nephew and son. When he came of age in 1714, Lord Pelham was one of the greatest landowners in the kingdom, enjoying enormous patronage in the county of Sussex. One stipulation of his uncle's will was that his nephew add Holles to his name, which he faithfully did, thereafter styling himself as Thomas Pelham-Holles. A long-standing legal dispute over the estate with his aunt was finally settled in 1714.

He increasingly identified with Whig politics, like his father and uncle, but whereas they had been moderate in their views, he grew increasingly more partisan and militant in his views. Britain was very divided between Whigs, who favoured the succession of George of Hanover after Queen Anne's death, and Tories, who supported the return of the Jacobite James Stuart, known later as the 'old pretender'. This issue dominated British politics during the last few years of Queen Anne's reign, leading up to her death in 1714, and had a profound impact on the future career of the young Duke of Newcastle. He joined the Hannover Club and the Kit Kat Club, both leading centres of Whig thinking and organisation. Newcastle House in London became his premier residence.

== Early political career ==
=== Royal favour ===
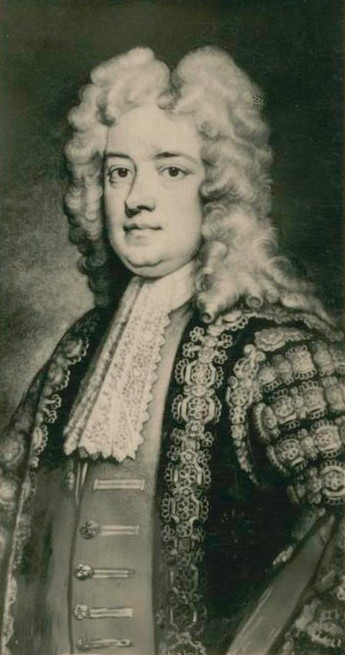
From 1720 Newcastle allied himself with Robert Walpole. They would be political partners for the next 20 years, and Newcastle would remain a loyalist until Walpole's fall in 1742.

Newcastle vigorously sustained the Whigs at Queen Anne's death and had much influence in making the Londoners accept King George I, even organising so-called 'Newcastle mobs' to fight with rival Jacobites in the street.

His services were too great to be neglected by the new Hanoverian king, and in 1714, he was created Earl of Clare, and in 1715 Marquess of Clare and Duke of Newcastle-upon-Tyne, two titles previously held by his late uncle John Holles. He also became Lord-Lieutenant of the counties of Middlesex and Nottingham and a Knight of the Garter. In his new position, he was in charge of suppressing Jacobitism in the counties under his control. In Middlesex, he arrested and questioned 800 people and drew up a Voluntary Defence Association to defend the county. In 1715, he became involved in a riot that ended with two men being killed, and Newcastle fleeing along rooftops. The succession of George I was secured in late 1715 by the defeat of a Jacobite army at the Battle of Preston and the subsequent flight of the Old Pretender.

=== Walpole's ally ===
The victory of the Hanoverians over the Jacobites marked the beginning of the Whig Ascendancy which lasted for much of the 18th century. Because the Tory opposition had been tainted, in the eyes of George I, by their support of the Jacobite pretenders, he did not trust them and drew all of his ministers and officials from the Whigs. Following their victory, the Whigs split with one group forming the government for George I, and the other dissident Whigs became the effective opposition in Parliament. After a period of political manoeuvring, he was for a while associated with a Whig faction led by James Stanhope, but from 1720, Newcastle began to identify strongly with the government Whigs, who had quickly come to be dominated by Sir Robert Walpole.

Walpole gladly welcomed the young Newcastle into his coterie because Walpole believed that he could easily control Newcastle and because it would strengthen Walpole's hand against the rival Whig factions. Newcastle joined with Walpole because Newcastle, correctly, believed that Walpole was going to dominate British politics for a generation. In 1721, Walpole began to serve as Britain's first prime minister and would hold that position for the next 21 years. He was related to Walpole's leading ally, Charles Townshend, strengthening his bond with the leader of the new administration.

On 2 April 1717, he increased his Whig connections by marrying Lady Henrietta Godolphin, the granddaughter of the Duke of Marlborough, a national hero following his victories in the recent European war who was considered a Whig icon.

== Lord Chamberlain ==
=== In office ===
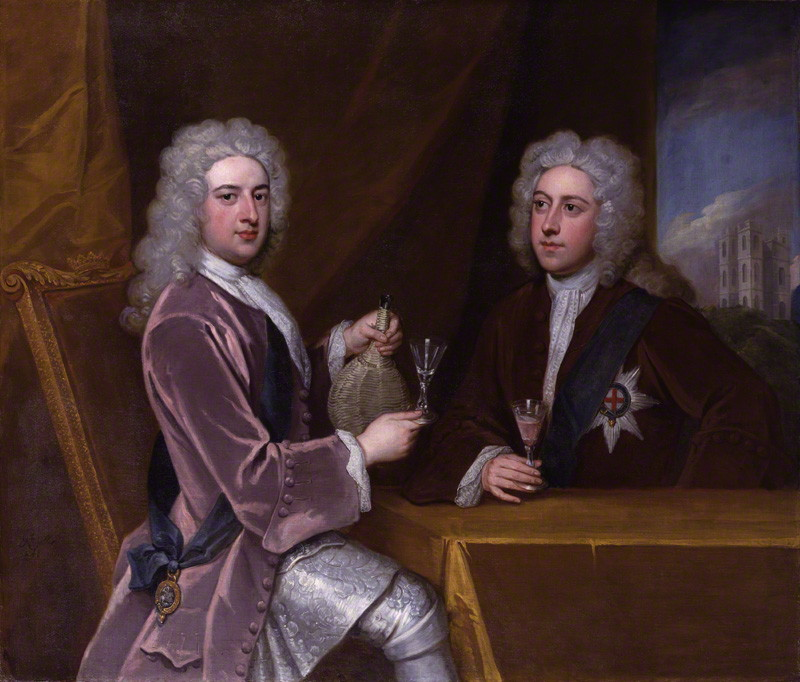
Newcastle (left) and Henry Clinton, 7th Earl of Lincoln as painted by Godfrey Kneller, c. 1721.

In 1717, at 23, Newcastle first attained high political office as Lord Chamberlain of the Household and was given the responsibility of overseeing theatres. Plays were often extremely political, and Newcastle was tasked with suppressing any plays or playwrights that he believed to be too critical of the Hanoverian succession or the Whig government. Newcastle clashed repeatedly with Sir Richard Steele, a leading playwright. In 1719, he was one of the three main investors in George Frideric Handel's new opera company, the Royal Academy of Music. The Duke ordered Handel in May 1719 to go to the Continent to contract singers for as long as possible.

He held the post for seven years and performed well enough to be considered for further promotion. Despite his youth, he had demonstrated his strength in several general elections when he had been able to get as many as 20 MPs elected to seats that he controlled through his family's wealth and political patronage. He survived in the office during the turmoil in the Whigs between 1717 and 1721, and his switch of allegiance to Walpole secured his influence thereafter. Walpole had overseen a brief end to the rift between the Whig factions after the collapse of the South Sea Company, which had left thousands ruined. Newcastle himself had lost £4,000. Walpole was then seen as the only man to bring stability to the country and the Whigs, and he was granted unprecedented powers, effectively making him the first prime minister of Great Britain.

During his time in the office, Newcastle and his wife had become famous for throwing lavish parties that were attended by much of London society including many of his political opponents. He was also prodigiously fond of fox hunting and often went down to Bishopstone, one of his Sussex properties, expressly for that purpose. During his time as Lord Chamberlain he oversaw a major overhaul of public buildings, many of which had fallen into very poor repair.

== Secretary of State ==
=== Appointment ===
In 1724, Newcastle was chosen by Walpole to be Secretary of State for the Southern Department in place of Lord Carteret, a move largely engineered by Townshend. He had been for some time considered the third most important man in the government, behind Walpole and Townshend, which was confirmed by his new position. Newcastle had for several years been growing increasingly interested in foreign affairs and had been educating himself on the subtle details of diplomacy and the European State System. However, his first few years in the office had him defer control of British foreign policy to the other Secretary of State, Townshend, and Newcastle effectively served as his deputy. Walpole was generally happy to allow Townshend to control foreign affairs, as he agreed with him on most issues.

=== The French Alliance ===
Since the Treaty of Utrecht, which had ended the last major European war, Britain had been an ally of France, a strong reversal in policy, as France had previously been considered the premier enemy of Britain. The reasons for the alliance were complex, and many had doubted the détente could last long, but when Newcastle became Secretary of State, they had been allies for nearly a decade. By 1719, they had become part of a wider Quadruple Alliance, which was by far the most powerful force in European politics, as had been demonstrated during the War of the Quadruple Alliance, a largely-naval war in the Mediterranean by which the powers had defeated a Spanish attempt to reclaim lost territory in Italy. The alliance was unpopular, however, with many in Parliament and in the country, which continued to consider France to be Britain's natural enemy.

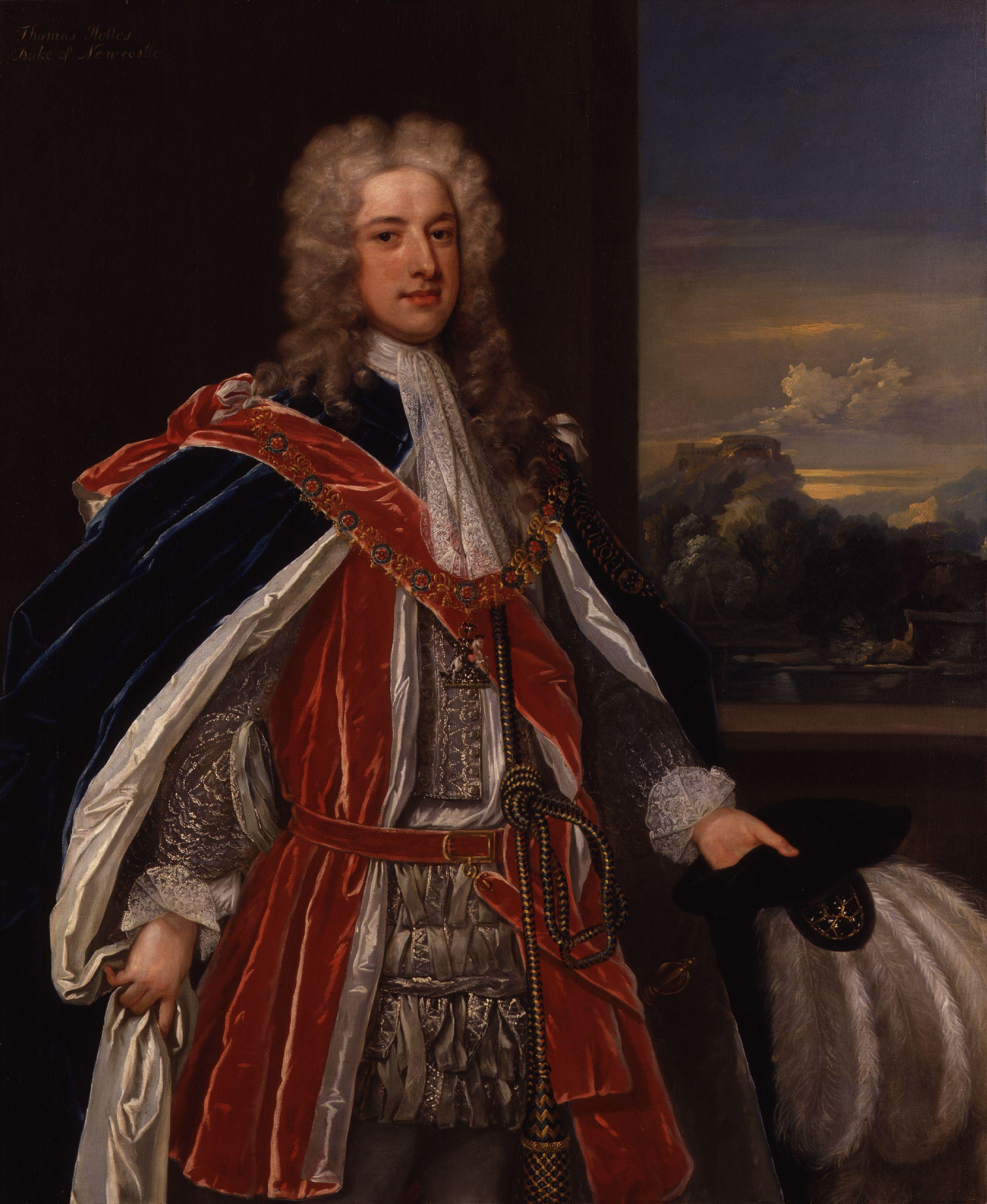
Newcastle in 1735 when he was Southern Secretary in the Walpole ministry

Newcastle had been joined in government by his young brother, Henry Pelham. The two brothers got on well but were prone to have intractable disputes. One constant source of tension between them was Newcastle's poor handling of the family fortune, which was being constantly depleted through his out-of-control spending. Pelham was also considered by many to be the abler of the two brothers, but it was the Duke who was initially more successful in politics. In spite of their differences, they remained firm political allies.

=== Domestic crisis ===
The administration faced a crisis in 1727, when George I died unexpectedly, and his son George II succeeded to the throne. The new king had previously had exceptionally bad relations with Walpole and Newcastle and, during one altercation between them, George's poor English had made Newcastle think that he had challenged him to a duel. Their relationship had not improved in recent years, and many anticipated the imminent replacement of the government.

Instead, Walpole made himself extremely useful to George II, who soon became convinced of his competence and retained him in his post. The thawing of relations was helped by the friendship between Newcastle and George's daughter Amelia, leading many to speculate, without substantive evidence, that they were having an affair. By November 1727, Walpole and Newcastle's positions were both safe once more, boosted by an election victory that saw them gain 430 seats to the opposition's 128 in the House of Commons.

In 1729, a rift broke out in the government over the direction of Britain's foreign policy. Townshend was convinced that Britain's principal enemy was now Austria. Walpole and Newcastle saw Spain as the main threat to British power because of its large navy and colonial interests. Eventually, Walpole had his way, forcing Townshend from office, and replacing him with Lord Harrington. From then on, Newcastle served as the senior Secretary of State and largely controlled British foreign policy himself. Newcastle was saddened by the demise of his relative and former patron although their partnership had become increasingly strained and the new situation offered enormous possibilities to him personally.

=== Peace policy ===
Together, Newcastle and Walpole managed to drive a wedge between Spain and Austria, making an ally of the latter and directing their future efforts against Spain. Subsequently, however, it turned out that Britain's long-term major rival was neither but France, which had been considered a close ally. The increasingly-confrontational actions of the French Chief Minister, Cardinal Fleury, soon convinced them that they had been wrong. This misjudgment was later used by the Patriot Whigs to castigate the ministry for their lack of preparation against the French threat.

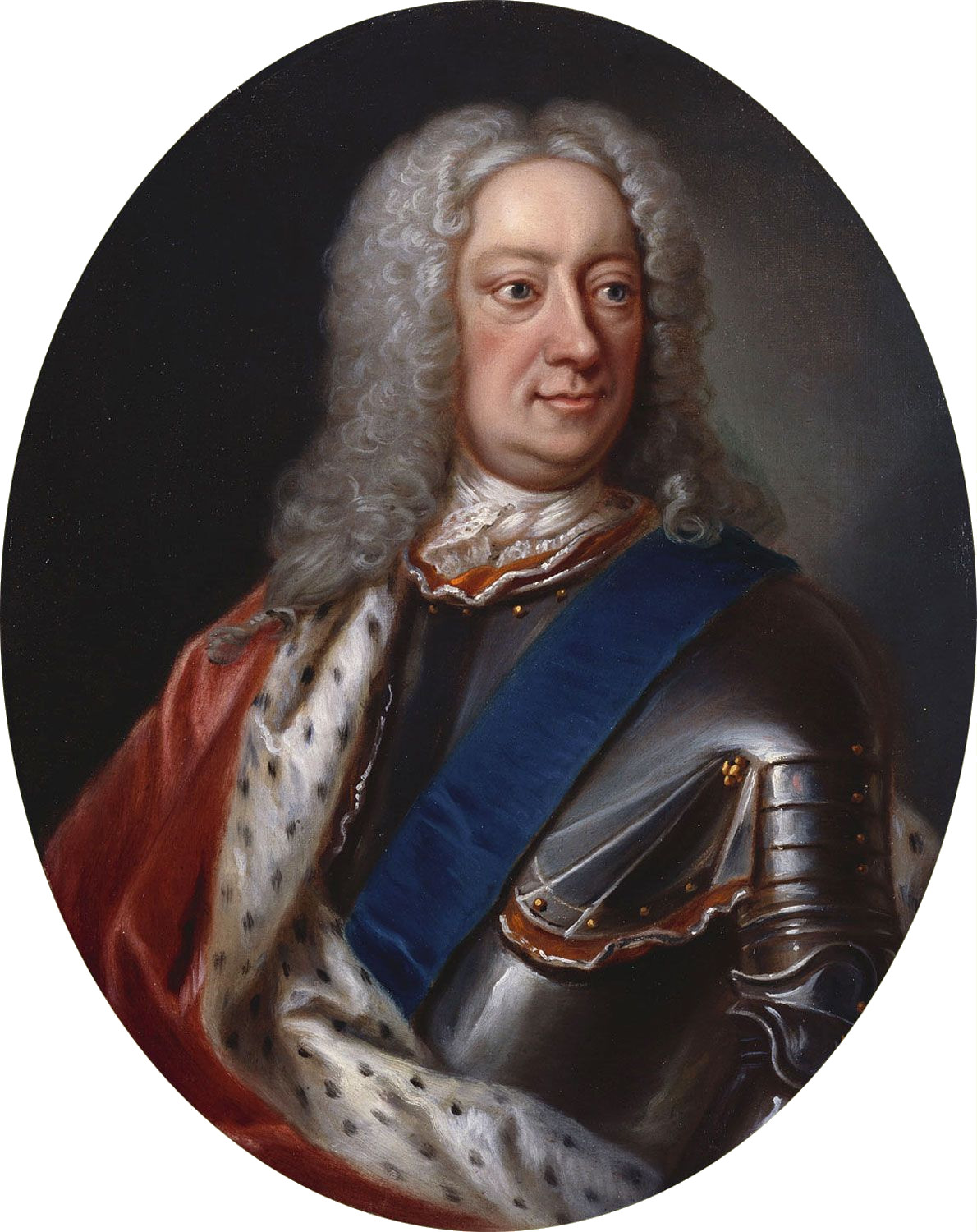
George II, who reigned from 1727 to 1760. Despite their initial violent hatred of each other, he and Newcastle grew to have a very productive relationship, which lasted for over three decades.

In general, Newcastle shared Walpole's abhorrence of war and wished to prevent Britain from getting dragged into major wars on the continent. Notably, Britain did not become embroiled in the War of the Polish Succession and indeed tried to prevent it from breaking out. Newcastle attempted to throw both the French and Austrians off-guard by being cagey about Britain's response if war broke out, but that did not stop the conflict. Once the war had started, George II tried to push for Britain to honour its commitment to assist Austria, but he was blocked by Walpole, who insisted that Britain should not join the war. Newcastle broadly supported the same position as the king, but he accepted the decision.

Newcastle's brother Henry Pelham had now attained the lucrative position of Paymaster General and had effectively replaced Townshend as the third man of the government. The three men continued what had become dubbed as the Norfolk Congress by meeting regularly at Houghton Hall, Sir Robert Walpole's country house in Norfolk. The three men would hold private meetings, draw up wide-ranging policies on foreign and domestic issues and then present them to parliament for their seal of approval, which their vast majority allowed them to do. Slowly, however, Newcastle and his brother were moving out of the shadow of Walpole and being more assertive. Newcastle was particularly annoyed both by what he saw as the abandonment of Austria and by the suggestion that Walpole no longer trusted him.

By 1735, Newcastle had largely assumed control of colonial affairs, further increasing the amount of patronage he controlled. A devout Anglican, he was also given control over ecclesiastical matters, especially the appointment of bishops and lucrative positions in the Church of England.

Newcastle's growing independence from Walpole was helped by the support of his brother and his best friend, Hardwicke, who had become Lord Chancellor. During the latter half of the decade, his job was increasingly dominated by managing relations with Spain, which included trade disputes and objections to the controversial founding of the American colony of Georgia in 1733. The longstanding peace policy was now beginning to look extremely fragile. He also acted as a mediator in the War of the Polish Succession, helping to bring the conflict to an end in 1738.

=== Jenkins' Ear and Spanish America ===
The growing tension between Britain and Spain came to a head in 1731 during an incident known as Jenkins' Ear, when a British merchant captain was captured for illegal trading off the coast of Cuba by a Spanish privateer, and in punishment for his alleged breach of the strict laws forbidding foreign commerce with Spanish colonies, he had an ear cut off. The incident shocked Britain not so much because of its brutality but because many saw it as an outrage that Spain should have the temerity to harm a British subject simply for trading, which many held to be a legitimate occupation despite the legal prohibition in force.

In 1738, Jenkins appeared in Parliament to testify about his treatment. Other merchants sent petitions, and the powerful South Sea Company mobilised popular opinion. To many, the Spanish Empire was crumbling, and its South American possessions were ripe for the picking. A vociferous group in Parliament demanded war with Spain. Walpole was adamantly opposed to such a policy and became a target for unprecedented attacks. Newcastle too came under intense pressure but initially considered the demands for Britain to declare war with Spain a dangerous step, and in spite of his increasingly bellicose statements, he still considered the idea of an Anglo-Spanish alliance as late as 1739. He tried to negotiate a solution to the crisis with the Convention of Pardo, which agreed a sum of compensation to be paid to British merchants, but British public opinion had shifted, and Walpole felt that there was no option but to declare war in December 1739.

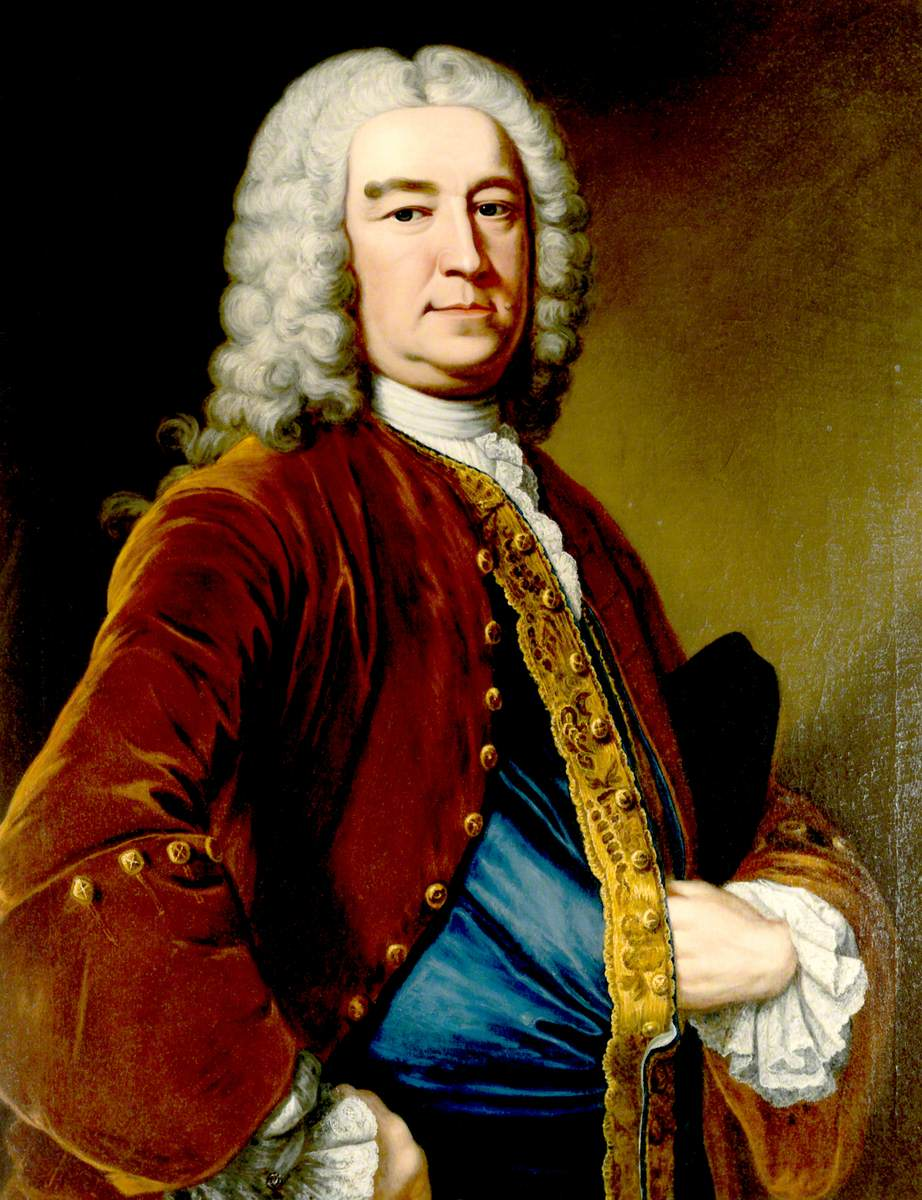
Newcastle enjoyed a close but at times strained relationship with his brother Henry Pelham. The two men formed a formidable political partnership following the fall of Walpole, and together dominated British politics until Henry's death in 1754.

The British opened the war with a victory, capturing Porto Bello in Panama. That led to an outbreak of patriotic fervour, and further increased the pressure on Walpole and Newcastle for their perceived unwilling prosecution of the war. Newcastle tried to combat that by cultivating a reputation as the leading "patriot" of the cabinet. He took on additional military responsibilities and, for the first two years of war, served as a de facto Minister of War. One of his most notable suggestions during the period was the recruitment of large numbers of troops drawn from the American colonies, whose growing manpower had previously gone largely untapped.

In 1741, the main British campaign against Spain was a combined amphibious attack on the South American city of Cartagena, which had experienced considerable delays. Command was awarded to Admiral Edward Vernon, the victor of Porto Bello, who was given a force of 31,000 soldiers and sailors to take the city. The siege proved to be a total disaster for the British, who lost thousands of men before being forced to withdraw. Although Newcastle had issued the orders and overseen the organisation of the expedition, much of the blame for the disaster fell on the shoulders of the ailing prime minister, Walpole.

=== Fall of Walpole ===
In the wake of the Cartagena disaster, Britain held a general election. The result reduced Walpole's former dominance of the House to an unworkable majority. Within months, he had been forced out of office and succeeded by Lord Wilmington. Though Newcastle stayed with Walpole to the end, he was later accused by many of Walpole's supporters of having undermined him. Horace Walpole, his son, continued to attack Newcastle's behaviour for years to come.

Newcastle continued in office after Walpole's fall and became more powerful on his younger brother Henry Pelham becoming prime minister in 1743. Together, the two brothers and their supporters known as the 'Old Whigs' made a coalition with the 'New Whigs', previous opponents of the Walpole government. However, there remained a strident opposition, led vocally by men like William Pitt and Lord Sandwich.

=== War of the Austrian Succession ===
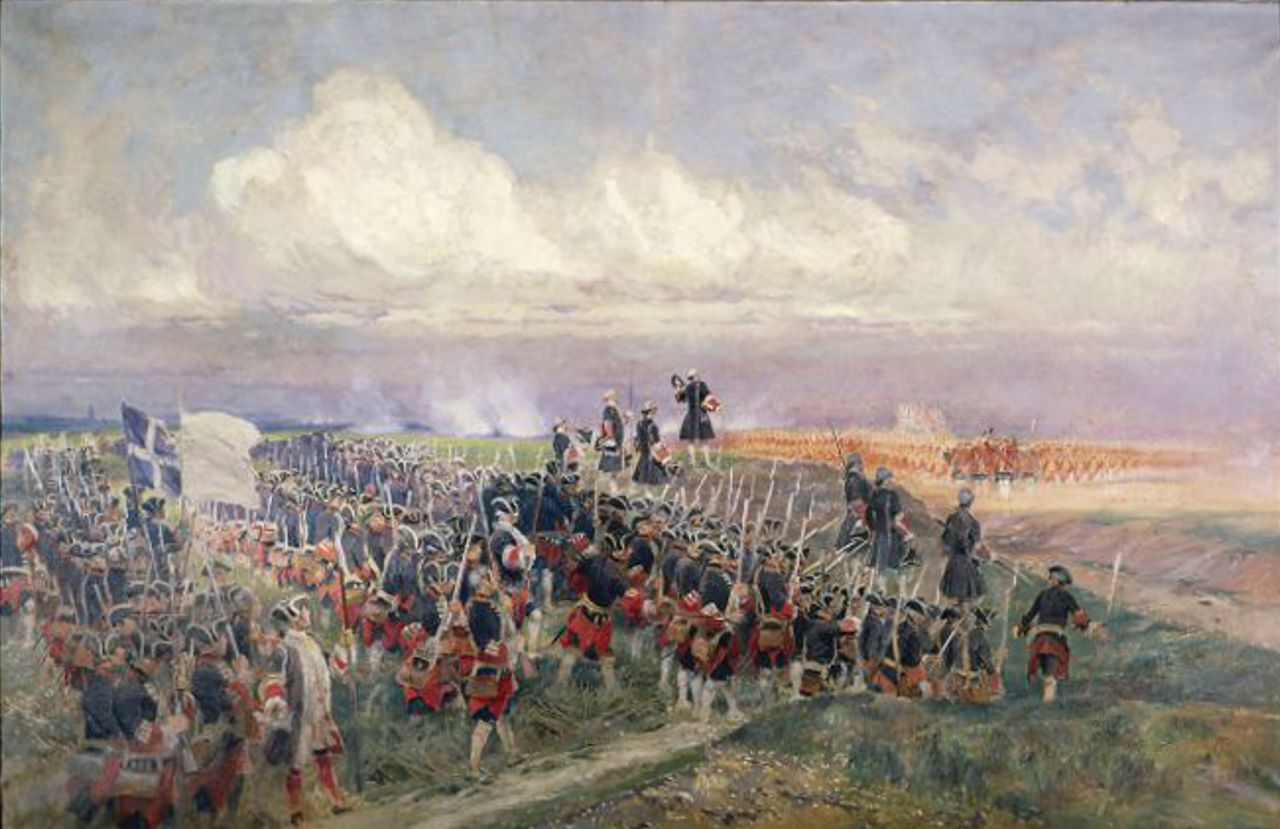
Newcastle was a strong supporter of Austria and advocated aid to the country during the War of the Austrian Succession. After the war, he built his system for retaining peace around the alliance with Austria, only for it to collapse spectacularly in 1756.

In 1740, shortly after the declaration of war with Spain, a separate war had broken out simultaneously in Europe into which the War of Jenkins' Ear soon became submerged. In a dispute over the throne of Austria, both France and Prussia had invaded Austria and planned to remove Empress Maria Theresa and replace her with their own claimant. Austria's longstanding alliance with Britain required the latter to declare war. It was also considered by many that a French victory would leave the French too strong in Europe. However, Britain soon found itself dragged into this wider war despite the reluctance of its government.

Initially, Britain's involvement was limited to financial subsidies and diplomacy in support of Austria, but by 1742, it was apparent that a more substantial commitment would be needed if the alliance were not to end in defeat. In the same year, 16,000 British troops were sent to the continent. Newcastle was a staunch Austrophile and strongly supported aid to the Austrians. He had long thought that the only way Britain could defeat France was in alliance with Austria, a view sharply at odds with many other leading politicians such as Walpole and Pitt.

Newcastle's position had briefly been threatened by Carteret, a royal favourite, but by 1743, Newcastle and his brother were firmly in control of British policy until 1756. Newcastle now set about drawing up a fresh scheme to enhance British power on the continent, including an attempt to persuade the Dutch Republic into the anti-French alliance and mediating the dispute between Austria and Prussia, which led to the Treaty of Dresden in 1745. He also approved plans for a colonial raid against Louisbourg in 1745, which was successful. Along with the defeat of a Spanish Invasion of Georgia in 1742, this strengthened the British position in North America.

=== Jacobite Rising ===
In 1745, the Jacobite Rising broke out in Scotland and soon spread to northern England. Newcastle feared an attack from the north by Bonnie Prince Charlie, who had already gathered 5,000 men in Derby, and a French invasion of southern England. In the panic, a number of false rumours circulated around London, including news that Newcastle had fled to the Continent for fear that all was lost. He was forced to show himself to a crowd that had gathered outside Newcastle House to prove that he was still there. Nonetheless, his position was threatened since if the Jacobites were triumphant his estates would likely have been confiscated and he would have been forced into exile.

Newcastle awoke to the threat posed by the Jacobites much faster than George II and many of his colleagues, who dismissed the rebellion as a farce. Newcastle organised a response, and by late 1745, he had rallied all of the southern militias and regular forces. The Jacobites withdrew to northern Scotland where they were defeated at Culloden in 1746.

=== Peace of Aix-la-Chapelle ===
On the Continent, the British continued the war effort, but they were now under pressure from the Dutch Republic to make peace with the French. The Dutch feared that the French would soon launch a devastating onslaught and overrun their country. Newcastle considered that any peace that would be made would be extremely disadvantageous to Britain, and he tried to keep the anti-French coalition strong through constant diplomacy and offers of financial subsidies.

Talks for a peace settlement were convened in the city of Breda in 1746. Newcastle was instrumental in securing the appointment of Lord Sandwich as the British representative at the talks, as his views were very close to his own. Sandwich's principal instructions were to delay the talks until a significant British victory allowed them to negotiate from a position of strength. The Congress of Breda did not progress well initially because the participants were not yet fully committed to peace. The Allies continued to do badly by suffering severe defeats at Bergen op Zoom and Lauffeld. Newcastle's brother, Henry, was now strongly advocating peace, but Newcastle firmly rejected that since he was still convinced a major Allied victory was imminent.

In 1747, Newcastle was involved in organising a coup to put the Prince of Orange in power in the Netherlands. Orange wanted to continue the war with the French but soon had to apply to the British for a massive loan. Newcastle, now aware of how close the Dutch were to collapsing altogether, reluctantly turned towards seeking a peaceful accommodation with France. He berated himself for his "ignorance, obstinacy and credulity" and half expected his misjudgment in putting so much faith in the Dutch to result in his dismissal, but both the king and the rest of the cabinet retained their faith in him.

To oversee the peace settlement, Newcastle switched across to the position of Northern Secretary. He secured Sandwich's promotion to the Admiralty although he had wanted Sandwich to succeed him as Southern Secretary. During the summer of 1748, Newcastle made his first ever trip outside Britain when he visited Hanover and was received with a rapturous reception wherever he went. When the talks got underway, they went far more smoothly, and in October 1748, the Treaty of Aix-la-Chapelle was formally concluded. Britain would give back Louisbourg to France in exchange for the return of Madras and a full French withdrawal from the Low Countries. The issue of free trade for which Britain had gone to war with Spain in 1739 was not mentioned at all.

Newcastle was immediately attacked by his opponents for giving up Louisbourg, but many of them failed to realise just how weak the British position on the Continent had become. Austria was also deeply unhappy as they felt the British had abandoned them and had not tried enough for Silesia to be returned. Nonetheless, Newcastle was happy with the terms that had been gained, and observers on the continent were full of praise on how he had overturned such a disadvantageous situation.

=== Newcastle System ===
Following the peace, Newcastle began to put into practice a policy that he had been developing for a very long time. He believed that the stately quadrille, which had seen states continually shifting alliances, had been unstable and led to repeated wars. He wanted instead to use vigorous diplomacy to create a lasting peace that would be built around a strong and stable British alliance with Austria. Like many Whigs he saw maintaining the European balance of power, as essential. He described the process as "restoring the Old System", but it was popularly known as the Newcastle System.

He came under continuous attack from Pitt and the Patriot Whigs, who despised his European policy because of their belief that the previous war had shown that North America was increasingly the most important theatre of war. They mocked Newcastle for his perceived lack of vision and ignored the complex nature of European politics and Britain's relationship with Hanover and the fact that as early as 1740 Newcastle had been aware of the expanding power of the American colonies.

Newcastle remained extremely attentive to the Austrian Alliance. He spent several years trying to secure the election of Maria Theresa's son, the future Emperor Joseph II, as King of the Romans, a title of the Holy Roman Empire that carried enormous prestige but little real power, only to see the scheme fail because of Austrian indifference. There were a number of warning signs that all was not well with the alliance, but Newcastle ignored most of them since he was convinced that neither Austria or Britain had any other serious potential allies to turn to. Referring to the election, Newcastle believed that if his scheme failed, "France and Prussia will dictate to all the world". He managed to broker a compromise at a Congress of Hanover to secure the election of Joseph. His triumph at the Congress was soon undermined by his failure to secure Austrian backing.

He managed to outmanoeuvre the Duke of Bedford by engineering his resignation and the dismissal of Lord Sandwich, whom Newcastle had now begun to consider a dangerously ambitious rival. The ease with which he did so demonstrated his total control of British politics, as Bedford led a strong faction. He had, however, made a significant enemy, who would later try to undermine Newcastle.

In 1752 he made a rare trip abroad by accompanying George II on his annual trip to Hanover. During the visit, Newcastle made an attempt to cultivate Lord North, a future prime minister, as an ally into his political faction. He was unsuccessful although both became good friends, and North later spoke out in defence of Newcastle.

In July 1753 Pelham advised Newcastle to ignore the opposition weekly The Protester and its editor James Ralph, remarking that the attacks “gave [him] not the least concern” and that “the less notice is taken of him the better.” By November, however, Newcastle had pressed for a settlement, and Pelham acquiesced in terms—arranged via Lord Hartington after an introduction by David Garrick—to grant Ralph a Treasury pension of £300 per annum with £200 down on condition that he cease political writing.

== Prime minister ==
=== First term: 1754–1756 ===
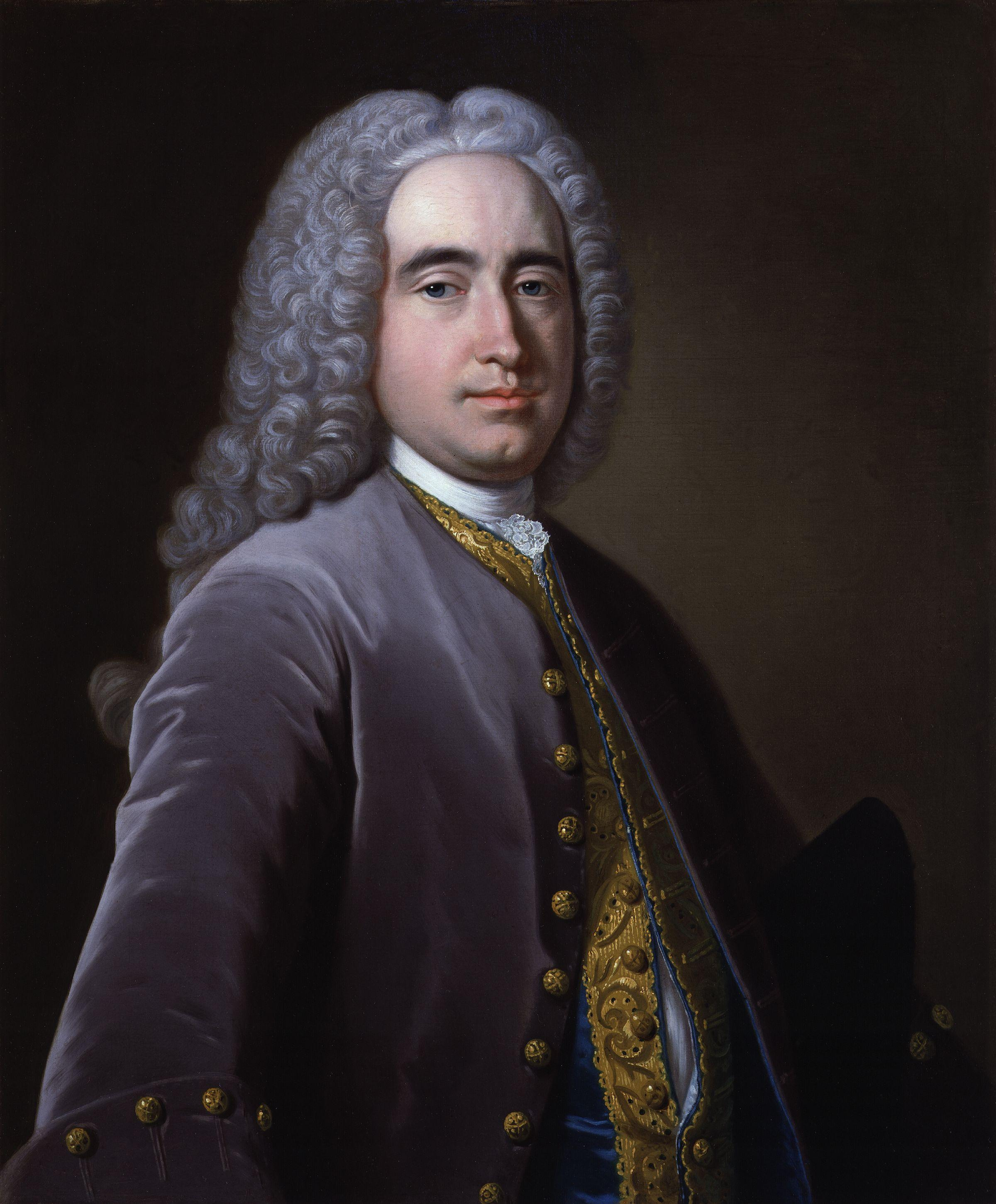
Henry Fox, 1st Baron Holland, by John Giles Eccardt, after Jean Baptiste van Loo, c. 1740

==== Appointment ====
On Henry Pelham's death on 6 March 1754, Newcastle succeeded him as prime minister. He had initially hoped to stay in his role as Northern Secretary as he much preferred foreign affairs, but he was persuaded there was no other serious candidate and accepted the seals of office from the king in March.

Newcastle's first task was to select someone to represent the government in the Commons. To great surprise, he rejected the favourites, William Pitt and Henry Fox, and chose Sir Thomas Robinson, who had barely even been considered a candidate by most. Newcastle was largely instrumental in appointing men considered slightly weaker so that he could dominate them. Both Pitt and Fox bore a grudge over the perceived slight and stepped up their attacks on the ministry.

In April and May 1754, Newcastle oversaw a general election, largely adopting the electoral strategy drawn up by his brother and winning a large majority. His own personal ability to have MPs elected on his slate reached new heights. He now felt emboldened enough to try to push through some financial reforms. He proposed measures to reduce the amount of interest paid to the Bank of England on the National Debt. His decision to do so may partly have been to deflect criticism that he was not sufficiently qualified on financial matters to control the Treasury. At the same time, he was still largely directing foreign policy, his main emphasis.

==== America ====
The rivalry between Britain and France in North America had been growing for some time. Both coveted the Ohio Country, which offered enormous potential for a new wealthy colony to be founded. Both nations sent military forces to occupy the territory. While the British set up the first initial post, they were driven out by a French expedition in 1754. Many wealthy Americans agitated for military action, but the preparations of the individual colonies for conflict were poor. There was more pressure in London from Patriot Whigs who felt the time was ripe for British America to expand into the interior.

In 1755, a major expedition was planned against the French in America. A force of British regulars would be sent to seize Ohio, while another of New England provincials would take control of Nova Scotia. A new commander in chief, Edward Braddock, would be appointed to oversee that to take over from the fractious efforts of the colonial assemblies. The architect of the scheme was the Duke of Cumberland, who held enormous political sway at the time. Braddock was a favourite, but Newcastle had his doubts about both Braddock and the plans. Newcastle had temporarily made an alliance with Henry Fox, whom he also disliked. Fox was a strong supporter of the campaign and forced Newcastle's hand.

A few months after arriving in America, Braddock's force was engulfed by disaster at the Battle of Monongahela. Attacked by a mixed force of French and American Natives in the wilderness, more than half were killed, including Braddock. The remainder retreated back to Philadelphia, leaving the French in full control of the interior. The Nova Scotia scheme had been more successful, but the Great Expulsion, which followed in its wake, created serious headaches for Newcastle.

All had taken place without war being formally declared. With the decline in the American situation, Newcastle was forced to abandon his plans for financial reform, as the money would instead need to be spent on military forces.

==== Loss of Menorca ====
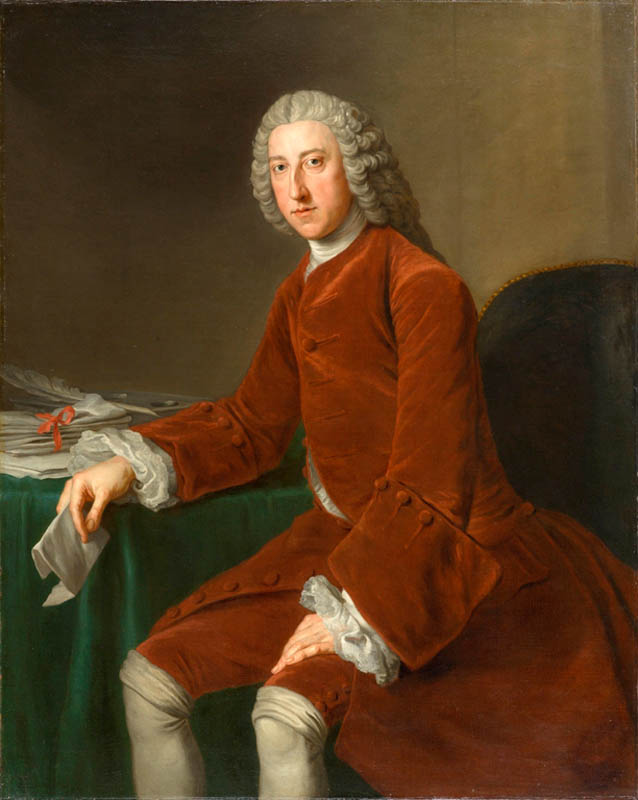
William Pitt was the leader of the Patriot Whigs and a constant thorn in Newcastle's side. Many were surprised when the two formed an electoral partnership in 1757.

While Newcastle had been paying attention to the American campaign, more pressing events in Europe demanded his attention.

Austria had been growing increasingly tense because of a longstanding belief that the British would abandon it at a crucial moment. Newcastle's worst fears were confirmed in 1756, when Austria concluded an alliance with France; the Diplomatic Revolution suddenly threw the whole balance of power in Europe askew.

Newcastle had hoped to prevent the outbreak of a major war in Europe by encircling France with hostile powers. He believed that would both deter them from attacking their neighbours and from sending reinforcements to North America. He thought that the only way war could happen now was if Frederick the Great unilaterally attacked Austria, but the clear disparity in numbers would make him a "madman" to do so. Newcastle hoped he had managed to avert war in Europe, but in 1756, Frederick invaded Saxony and Bohemia triggering the major European war that Newcastle had feared and failed to prevent. What had begun as a limited war in the Ohio Country between Britain and France now took on global proportions.

Newcastle was widely blamed for Britain's poor start to the Seven Years' War, and in November 1756 he was replaced by the Duke of Devonshire. Some had even called for his execution after the loss of Menorca (historically called "Minorca" by the British) in 1756. Instead, the commander of the British fleet, John Byng, was shot after a court-martial, which many considered a smokescreen to protect Newcastle.

For his long services, he was created Duke of Newcastle-under-Lyne, with remainder to the 9th Earl of Lincoln, who had married his niece Catherine Pelham.

==== Interlude ====
Between November 1756 and June 1757, the Duke of Devonshire replaced Newcastle as prime minister although Pitt is widely credited as the main influence on policy.

=== Second term: 1757–1762 ===
==== Return ====
In July 1757, he again became prime minister as Pitt could not gain enough support in Parliament. It is often incorrectly stated that Pitt was prime minister during the war, but Newcastle actually held the office. Their relationship grew into a fruitful partnership and provided a determined leadership that some felt had been lacking for some time.

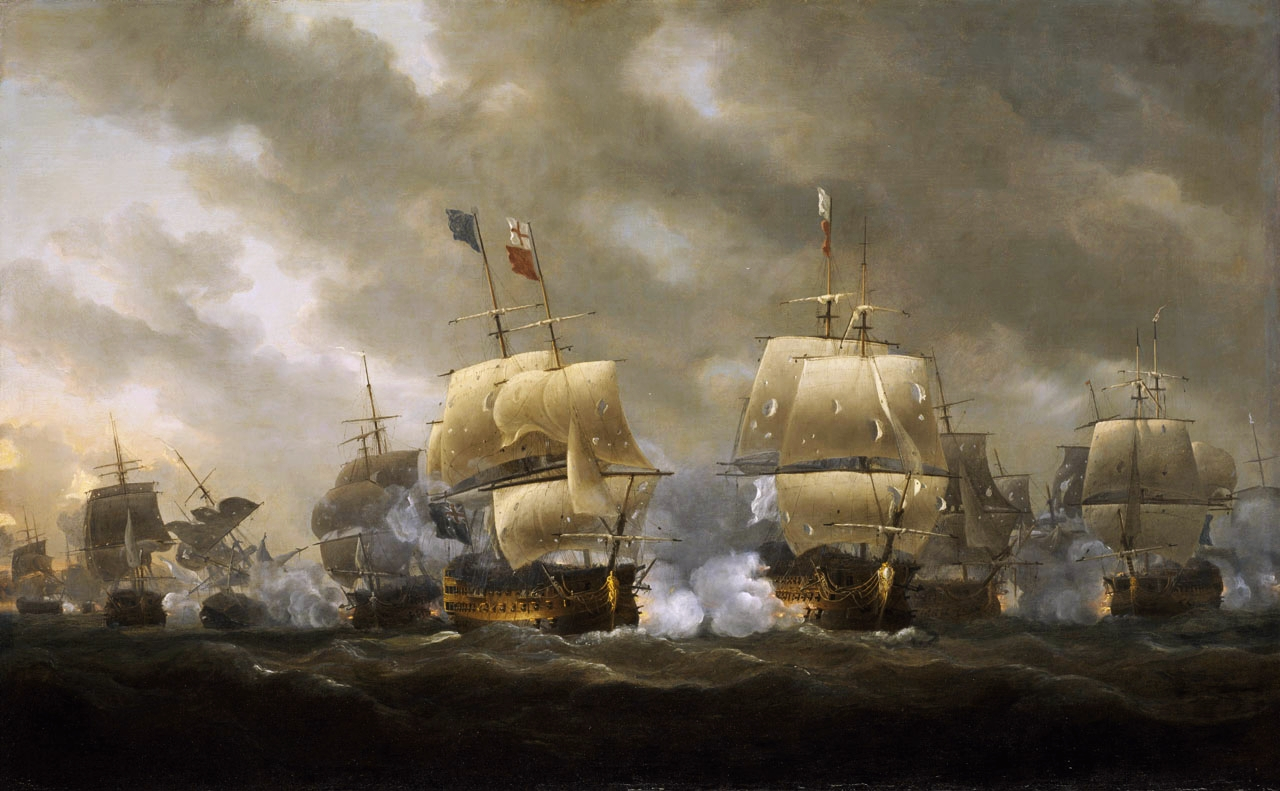
1759 became known as the "Annus mirabilis" after Britain enjoyed victories on several continents as well as at sea. In November a French fleet planning to invade England was defeated at Quiberon. Much of the credit went to Pitt, rather than Newcastle.

On paper, it was an implausible alliance. Pitt had been a strident critic of Newcastle for years, and they had separate, conflicting visions of strategy. Newcastle saw Britain's best chance of victory in directing resources to the war on the continent, but Pitt wanted a wholesale shift in policy to concentrate British forces in North America, West Africa and Asia, where the French were most vulnerable. However, they shared some views, were both ardent Whigs and had even once tried to create a political alliance. Newcastle had previously tried to have Pitt appointed Secretary of War in 1745, but George II vetoed the appointment.

==== Seven Years' War ====
Ultimately British policies were formed from a mixture of these two views. Newcastle insisted on British involvement on the continent to tie down French troops and to authorise a number of expeditions against French colonies. As they were successful, the expeditions began to grow in number and size. Pitt largely took over control of directing them, and Newcastle agreed with the measures and made sure that Parliament was kept on-side by mobilising his control of MPs. However, Pitt and Newcastle would discuss strategy along with a small number of other figures such as Hardwicke, Anson and Ligonier.

Newcastle had been deeply concerned by Britain's poor start to the war, particularly by the loss of Menorca and the French occupation of key ports in the Austrian Netherlands. To try to boost Britain's position in the Mediterranean, he pushed for an invasion of Corsica, which was then controlled by neutral Genoa, to use as a naval base or for a British attack on Ostend to drive the French out. Pitt was alarmed that both prospects would lead Britain into war with Austria or Genoa. Instead, to placate Newcastle and George II, Pitt agreed to send a British contingent to fight in Germany in 1758.

==== Success ====
In 1758, Pitt began despatching expeditions around the world to seize French colonies. In 1758, they captured Senegal and Gambia in West Africa and Louisbourg in North America. He planned to intensify this the next year by despatching large expeditions to the West Indies and Canada. To do so, Pitt stripped the British Isles of troops and ships, which caused Newcastle to worry that they were ill-defended. His fears increased when the British received intelligence of French plans to launch an invasion of Britain. Pitt was determined to press ahead with that year's plans but agreed to lessen the scale of colonial expeditions for 1760 since he expected that 1759 would provide a knockout blow to the French war effort.

Newcastle had retained his previous belief that Britain needed to create as broad a coalition as possible and that Europe, rather than the Americas, would be decisive. He thus attempted to persuade a number of different states to join the anti-French alliance. He was largely unsuccessful since the Dutch, Danes and Portuguese remained neutral, and Sweden and Russia joined the French and Austrians in attacking Prussia. He authorised large sums to be paid as subsidies to the Prussians, who were fighting countries whose land forces dwarfed their own.

One of Newcastle's greatest personal achievements was his use of diplomacy to keep Spain out of the war until 1762, when it was too late to alter the balance of power significantly. In 1759, he and Pitt organised Britain's defences against a planned French invasion, which failed because of British naval victories at Lagos and Quiberon.

=== Dismissal ===
This "broad bottom government", under which Britain gained reputation abroad, gradually fell owing to the affection of the new king George III for John Stuart, 3rd Earl of Bute, who, having supplanted Pitt, became prime minister in place of Newcastle in May 1762. George III had described Pitt as a "snake in the grass" and Newcastle as a "knave".

Despite their undeniably competent prosecution of the war, the new king did not trust either man with the future of Britain and cast them both into opposition. It marked arguably the last occasion upon which a British monarch was able to remove a prime minister purely out of personal animosity: that privilege would in future be ceded entirely to Parliament. As Bute was a Tory, this marked the end of the Whig monopoly on government which had been continual since the Hanoverian Succession in 1714.

== Later years ==
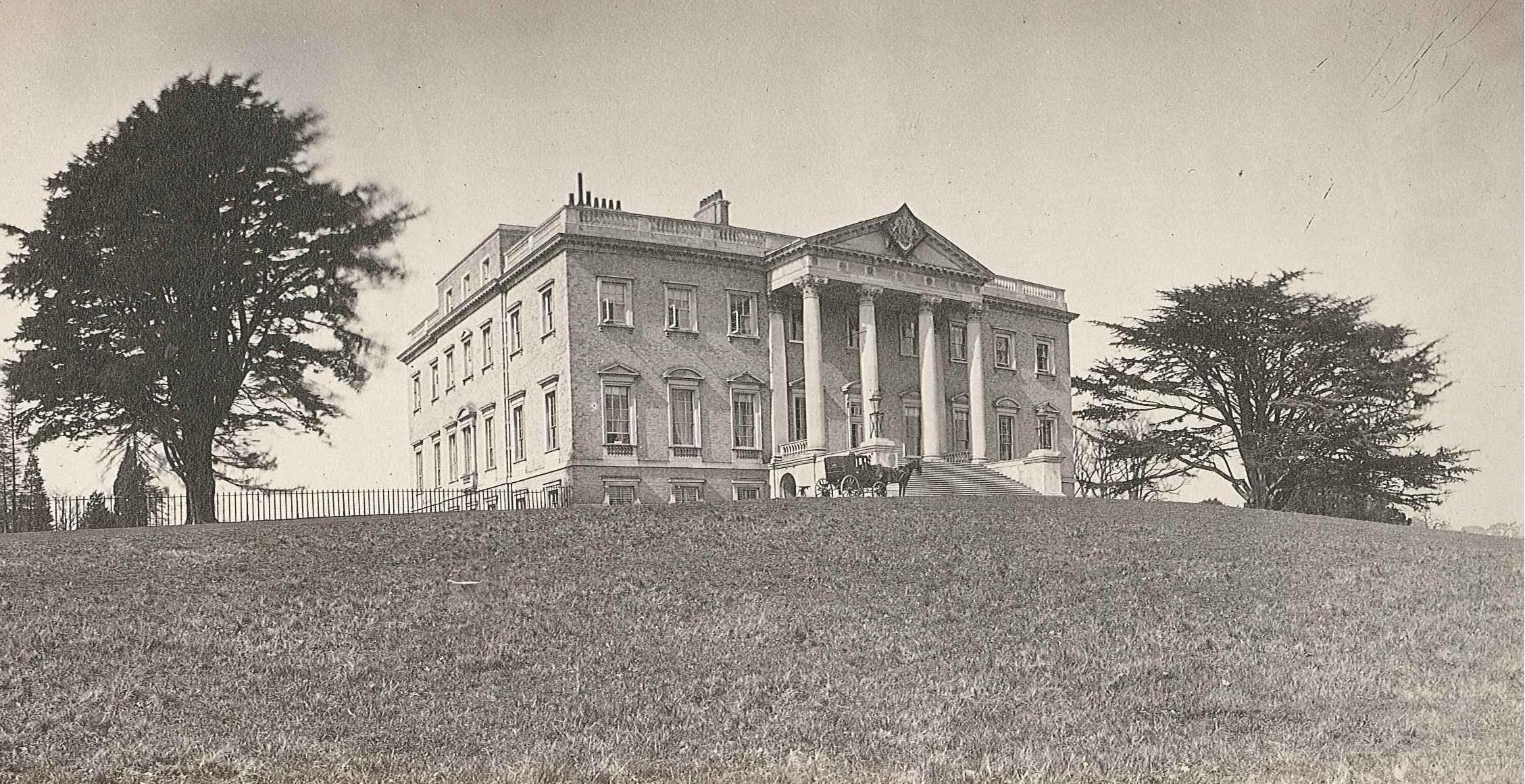
Newcastle spent much of his last few years at Claremont. He was exceptionally proud of the house and its extensive gardens on which he had spent a fortune.

=== Opposition ===
The Duke went into opposition and lost his two Lord-Lieutenancies for opposing the peace of 1763. Along with Pitt, he felt the terms of peace were overly generous to France and Spain because of the position of strength held by the British. Many territories captured during the war were handed back, but the French presence had been effectively destroyed permanently in Canada and in India.

He spent much of his time at his house at Claremont, which he considered one of his finest achievements. Newcastle had been in government for almost 45 continuous years and initially enjoyed the new freedom that opposition gave him.

=== Final return ===
In 1765, he became Lord Privy Seal in the government of Lord Rockingham, who shared many similarities with Newcastle, and both men were both wealthy Whig grandees. Newcastle was at one point offered the position of Southern Secretary by the king, but he turned it down. He lasted for a few months before the government collapsed, which was replaced by that of the Duke of Grafton.

=== Retirement ===
He remained in active opposition but accepted he would not hold office again. He continued to wield enormous patronage and influence, but his health swiftly gave way after a stroke in December 1767, which left him lame and impaired in speech and memory. In his final few months, he had counselled against the Coercive Acts on British America. He died in November 1768, aged 75, at his London home in Lincoln's Inn Fields. After his death, Claremont was sold to Robert Clive who had made his name in the Seven Years' War.

The Duke was industrious and energetic, and to his credit, the statesman who almost monopolised the patronage of office for half a century twice refused a pension and finally left office £300,000 poorer than he entered it because of his heavy spending on political campaigns, his lavish lifestyle and his neglect of the family budget.

== Legacy ==
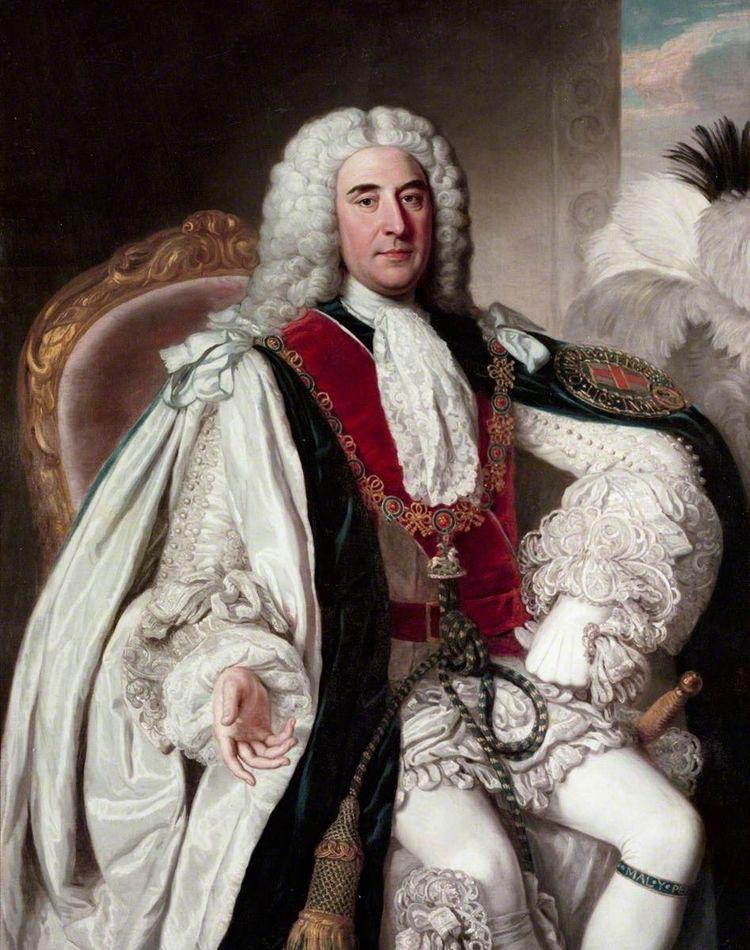
The Duke of Newcastle wearing the Robes of the Order of the Garter, by William Hoare, c. 1750

Newcastle was widely caricatured, often being portrayed as a muddle-headed buffoon who struggled to understand the business of government. He was one of the most ridiculed politicians of the 18th century. A common and widely circulated example of his cluelessness is his reported response to being told by Ligonier that Annapolis needed to be defended, to which Newcastle allegedly replied, "Annapolis! Oh yes, Annapolis must be defended, to be sure. Annapolis must be defended—where is Annapolis?".

Horace Walpole, no friend of him, sketched his character thus: "A borrowed importance and real insignificance gave him the perpetual air of a solicitor.... He had no pride, though infinite self-love. He loved business immoderately; yet was only always doing it, never did it. When left to himself, he always plunged into difficulties, and then shuddered for the consequences."

Historical opinion has generally been divided, with some historians drawing the conclusion that he was unfit for his office, but others regard him as a shrewd political operator who subtly navigated the complex European State System of the 18th century. He is both praised and criticised as being perhaps the greatest machine politics operator of the 18th century, who commanded immense voting strength in parliament. He could often organise majorities in the House of Commons for seemingly perplexing, unpopular and absurd policies of the government.

Generally, praise for Britain's victory in the Seven Years' War has gone to Pitt rather than Newcastle, who officially headed the government. Traditionally, accounts of the war have portrayed Pitt as a visionary who won the war by reversing Newcastle's previous unwise policy of focusing on European affairs; Francis Parkman records correspondence between Pitt and his military administrators and none between them and Newcastle. Others have defended Newcastle by contrasting his 'continental policy' with Lord North's failure to gather European allies during the American War of Independence, which led to Britain's eventual defeat in this conflict.

=== Popular culture ===
He was portrayed in the novel Humphry Clinker by Tobias Smollett as a bungling fool, ignorant of all geography, who is convinced that Cape Breton is not an island. Newcastle was played in the 1948 film Bonnie Prince Charlie by G. H. Mulcaster. He also features in the British television series City of Vice, which covers the early years of the Bow Street Runners.

== Family ==
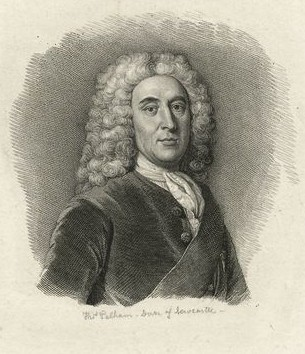
Thomas Pelham-Holles, 1st Duke of Newcastle-upon-Tyne

On 2 April 1717, he married Lady Harriet Godolphin, daughter of the 2nd Earl of Godolphin and granddaughter of John Churchill, 1st Duke of Marlborough. The Duchess suffered from poor health and the couple had no children.

In 1731, at Houghton Hall, Sir Robert Walpole's country house in Norfolk, the Duke, with the Duke of Lorraine (later the Holy Roman Emperor), was made a Master Mason by the Grand Master, Lord Lovell, at an Occasional Lodge. In 1739, at the creation of London's Foundling Hospital, he acted as one of the charity's founding governors.

=== Succession ===
With the prospect that the dukedom of Newcastle upon Tyne would become extinct once again, King George II also created the Duke of Newcastle-under-Lyne in 1756, with a special remainder for inheritance through his nephew, the 9th Earl of Lincoln.

In 1762, he was also created Baron Pelham of Stanmer, with inheritance to his cousin and male heir, Thomas Pelham.

On his death in 1768, the title Baron Pelham of Stanmer, together with the bulk of the Pelham estates in Sussex and the Duke's private papers, were left to Thomas, who was later created Earl of Chichester. Pelham and his brother were buried at All Saints' Church in Laughton, East Sussex.

The Holles and Clare estates, meanwhile, together with his Newcastle dukedom, were inherited by Lord Lincoln from whom the Duke had become estranged.

== Ancestry ==
Ancestors of Thomas Pelham-Holles, 1st Duke of Newcastle

8. Sir Thomas Pelham, 2nd Baronet, of Laughton
4. Sir John Pelham, 3rd Baronet, of Laughton
9. Mary Wilbraham
2. Thomas Pelham, 1st Baron Pelham
10. Robert Sydney, 2nd Earl of Leicester
5. Lady Lucy Sydney
11. Lady Dorothy Percy
1. Thomas Pelham-Holles, 1st Duke of Newcastle
12. John Holles, 2nd Earl of Clare
6. Gilbert Holles, 3rd Earl of Clare
13. Hon. Elizabeth Vere
3. Lady Grace Holles
14. Hon. William Pierrepont
7. Grace Pierrepont
15. Elizabeth Harries

== Arms ==
Coat of arms of Thomas Pelham-Holles, 1st Duke of Newcastle
Coronet Coronet of a duke Crest A peacock in his pride argent. Escutcheon Quarterly, 1 & 3, Azure, three pelicans argent vulning themselves in the breast gules (Pelham); 2 & 3, Ermine, two piles in point sable (Holles). Supporters Dexter, A bay horse; Sinister, A bear proper, each collared or gorged with a belt argent, buckles and studs gold. Motto Vincit amor patriæ (The love of my country prevails). Orders The Most Noble Order of the Garter - Knight Companion (KG). Other versions Quarterly of six 1st and 6th grand quartered 1 and 4 Azure three pelicans vulning themselves Argent (Pelham); 2 and 3 Ermine two piles conjoined in base Sable (Holles); 2nd Gules two demi belts issuant in base erect Argent the buckles Or (Pelham); 3rd Ermine on a fess Gules three ducal coronets Or (Crownell); 4th Or fretty Azure (Willoughby); 5th Azure two bars Argent on a canton Sable a wolf's head erased Argent (Wilbraham).

== Bibliography ==
- Anderson, Fred (2000). Crucible of War: The Seven Years' War and the Fate of Empire in British North America, 1754–1766. Faber and Faber.
- Barnes, Donald G. "The Duke of Newcastle, Ecclesiastical Minister, 1724–54." Pacific Historical Review 3.2 (1934): 164–191. in JSTOR
- Browning, Reed (1975). The Duke of Newcastle. Yale University Press. ISBN 978-0-300-01746-5.
- Browning, Reed (2004). "Holles, Thomas Pelham-, duke of Newcastle upon Tyne and first duke of Newcastle under Lyme (1693–1768)". Oxford Dictionary of National Biography (online May 2011 ed.). Oxford University Press. doi:10.1093/ref:odnb/21801. (Subscription, Wikipedia Library access or UK public library membership required.)
- Dickinson, Harry T. (2003). David Loads (ed.). "Newcastle". Readers Guide to British History. 2: 951–2.
- Field, Ophelia (2008). The Kit-Cat Club: Friends who Imagined a Nation. Harper Collins.
- Hibbert, Christopher (1999). George III: A Personal History. Penguin Books.
- Kelch, Ray A. (1974). Newcastle: A Duke without Money. Berkeley: University of California. ISBN 978-0-520-02537-0.
- McLynn, Frank (2005). 1759: The Year Britain Became Master of the World. London: Jonathan Cape. ISBN 978-0-87113-881-1.
- Middleton, Richard. The Bells of Victory: The Pitt-Newcastle Ministry and Conduct of the Seven Years' War 1757-1762 (Cambridge University Press, 2002).
- Murphy, Orville T. (1982). Charles Gravier: Comte de Vergennes: French Diplomacy in the Age of Revolution. New York Press.
- Nichols, R.H.; Wray, F.A. (1935). The History of the Foundling Hospital. Oxford University Press.
- Nulle, Stebelton H. "The Duke of Newcastle and the Election of 1727." Journal of Modern History 9.1 (1937): 1–22. in JSTOR
- Pearce, Edward (2008). The Great Man: Sir Robert Walpole: Scoundrel, Genius and Britain's First Prime Minister. London: Pimlico}. ISBN 978-0-09952-639-1.
- Rodger, N.A.M. (2006). Command of the Ocean: A Naval History of Britain 1649–1815. Penguin Books.
- Rodger, N.A.M. (1993). The Insatiable Earl: A Life of John Montagu, Fourth Earl of Sandwich, 1718–1792. Harper Collins.
- Simms, Brendan (2008). Three Victories and a Defeat: The Rise and Fall of the First British Empire. Penguin Books.
- Sykes, Norman. "The Duke of Newcastle as Ecclesiastical Minister." English Historical Review 57.225 (1942): 59–84. in JSTOR
- Taylor, Stephen. "'The Fac Totum in Ecclesiastic Affairs'? The Duke of Newcastle and the Crown's Ecclesiastical Patronage." Albion 24#3 (1992): 409–433.
- Whiteley, Peter (1996). Lord North: The Prime Minister who lost America. The Hambledon Press.
- Williams, Basil. The Whig Supremacy 1714-1760 (2nd ed. Revised By C. H. Stuart; Oxford UP, 1962). online

Political offices
Preceded by The Duke of Bolton	Lord Chamberlain; 1717–1724	Succeeded by The Duke of Grafton
Preceded by The Lord Carteret	Secretary of State for the Southern Department; 1724–1748	Succeeded by The Duke of Bedford
Preceded by The Earl of Chesterfield	Secretary of State for the Northern Department; 1748–1754	Succeeded by The Earl of Holdernesse
Preceded by The Earl of Chesterfield	Leader of the House of Lords; 1748–1756	Succeeded by The Duke of Devonshire
Preceded by Henry Pelham	Prime Minister of Great Britain; 1754–1756	Succeeded by The Duke of Devonshire
Preceded by The Duke of Devonshire	Prime Minister of Great Britain; 1757–1762	Succeeded by The Earl of Bute
Preceded by The Duke of Devonshire	Leader of the House of Lords; 1757–1762	Succeeded by The Earl of Egremont
Preceded by The Duke of Marlborough	Lord Privy Seal; 1765–1766	Succeeded by William Pitt the Elder
Honorary titles
Preceded by The Duke of Buckingham and Normanby	Lord Lieutenant of Middlesex; 1714–1763	Succeeded by The Earl of Northumberland
Preceded by The Duke of Buckingham and Normanby	Custos Rotulorum of Middlesex; 1714–1762	Succeeded by The Earl of Northumberland
Vacant Title last held by The Duke of Newcastle-upon-Tyne	Lord Lieutenant of Nottinghamshire; 1714–1763	Succeeded by The Duke of Kingston-upon-Hull
Preceded by The Lord Ashburnham	Vice-Admiral of Sussex; 1715–1768	Vacant Title next held by The Earl of Ashburnham
Preceded by The Earl of Abergavenny	Lord Lieutenant of Sussex; 1761–1763	Succeeded by The Earl of Egremont
Preceded by The Duke of Kingston-upon-Hull	Lord Lieutenant of Nottinghamshire; 1765–1768	Succeeded by The Duke of Newcastle-under-Lyne
Preceded by The Duke of Dorset	Senior Privy Counsellor; 1765–1768	Succeeded by The Earl of Winchilsea and Nottingham
Peerage of Great Britain
New creation Title last held by John Holles	Duke of Newcastle-upon-Tyne; 3rd creation 1715–1768	Extinct
New creation	Duke of Newcastle-under-Lyne; 1756–1768	Succeeded by Henry Pelham-Clinton
New creation	Earl of Clare; 1714–1768	Extinct
New creation	Baron Pelham of Stanmer; 1762–1768	Succeeded by Thomas Pelham
Peerage of England
Preceded by Thomas Pelham	Baron Pelham of Laughton; 1712–1768	Extinct
Baronetage of England
Preceded by Thomas Pelham	Baronet (of Laughton); 1712–1768	Succeeded by Thomas Pelham
