= Basil Williams (historian) =

English historian (1867–1950)

OBE Basil Williams
- Born: Arthur Frederic Basil Williams; 4 April 1867; London, England
- Died: 5 January 1950 (aged 82)

Academic background
- Education: New College, Oxford

Academic work
- Discipline: History
- Institutions: McGill University; University of Edinburgh

Arthur Frederic Basil Williams OBE (4 April 1867 – 5 January 1950) was an English historian.

== Early life and service in the Second Boer War ==
Williams was born in London, the son of a barrister. He was educated at Marlborough College and then read Classics at New College, Oxford. He was a clerk in the House of Commons. One of his duties was to attend the parliamentary committee of inquiry into the responsibility for the Jameson raid, and he became familiar with Cecil Rhodes, whose biography he later wrote.

Williams served in the Second Boer War, where one of his companions was Erskine Childers, of whom he later wrote a memoir. In 1905 he married Dorothy Caulfeild [sic]. She died two years before him.

== Failed political candidate and service in the First World War ==
Williams came back to the UK briefly, then returned to South Africa as a civilian, in the service of Lord Milner. He also worked as an assistant to Lionel Curtis, the town clerk of Johannesburg. In 1910 he was twice unsuccessful in UK parliamentary elections standing in the Liberal interest, in turn for the seats of Lewes and Rugby. During the First World War he served as an education officer in the Royal Field Artillery and in 1919 was awarded the OBE for his services.

== Historian ==
Williams had already made an impression as an academic, with a series of articles on Sir Robert Walpole's foreign policy in The English Historical Review (1900–1). He became Kingsford Professor of History at McGill University in 1921, and then professor of History at Edinburgh University from 1925 to 1937 when he retired. In 1935 he was elected a fellow of the British Academy.

He wrote biographies of Pitt the Elder (The Life of William Pitt, Earl of Chatham, 1913), and Stanhope (1932), Carteret and Newcastle (1943). He retained his interest in South Africa, and this became a secondary sphere of historical interest. In 1946 he produced a book Botha, Smuts and South Africa for the "Teach Yourself History" series. He also contributed a volume entitled The Whig Supremacy to the Oxford History of England, later updated by C. H. Stuart.

He was the General Editor of The Makers of the Nineteenth Century series published by Constable, London and Henry Holt, New York.

== See also ==
- Milner's Kindergarten
