= The Life of William Pitt, Earl of Chatham =

1913 biography

- Author: Basil Williams
- Language: English
- Genre: Biography
- Publisher: Longmans, Green & Co.
- Publication date: 1913
- Media type: Print

The Life of William Pitt, Earl of Chatham is a two-volume biography of the British eighteenth-century statesman William Pitt, Earl of Chatham. Written by the historian Basil Williams it was originally published in 1913. It has remained a standard work on Pitt, particularly his conduct of strategy during Britain's victory during the Seven Years War.

== Bibliography ==
- Middleton, Richard. The Bells of Victory: The Pitt-Newcastle Ministry and Conduct of the Seven Years' War 1757-1762. Cambridge University Press, 2002.
