= Harriet Pelham-Holles, Duchess of Newcastle =

English peer (1701–1776)

Her Grace The Duchess of Newcastle
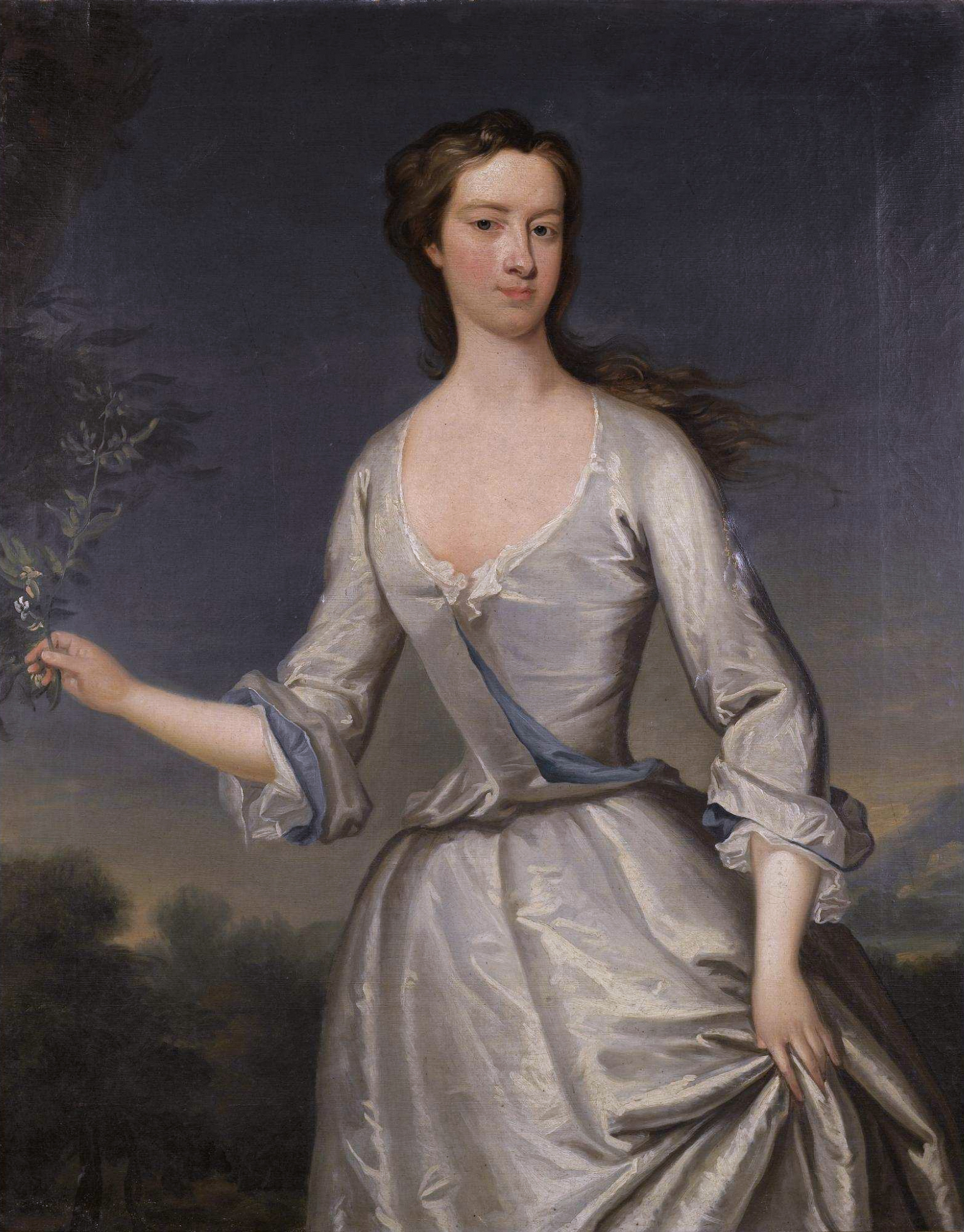
- Portrait by Charles Jervas
- Born: 1701; England
- Died: 17 July 1776 (aged 74–75); England
- Resting place: All Saints Churchyard, Laughton, East Sussex
- Known for: Spouse of the prime minister of Great Britain (1754–56; 1757–62)
- Political party: Whig
- Spouse: Thomas Pelham-Holles, 1st Duke of Newcastle (m. 1717; died 1768)
- Parent(s): Francis Godolphin, 2nd Earl of Godolphin; Henrietta Churchill, 2nd Duchess of Marlborough

Henrietta "Harriet" Pelham-Holles, Duchess of Newcastle upon Tyne and Duchess of Newcastle-under-Lyne (1701 – 17 July 1776), was the wife of British statesman and prime minister Thomas Pelham-Holles, 1st Duke of Newcastle.

== Family ==
She was the daughter of Francis Godolphin, 2nd Earl of Godolphin, and Henrietta Churchill, 2nd Duchess of Marlborough. She was also the granddaughter of Sidney Godolphin, 1st Earl of Godolphin, as well as John Churchill, 1st Duke of Marlborough, and Sarah Churchill, Duchess of Marlborough.

== Devoted Whig and Hanoverian loyalist ==
Until her marriage, she was known as Lady Harriet Godolphin. Like her husband, she was a devoted Whig and supporter of the Hanoverian succession. They married on 2 April 1717. They had no children.

== Hostess for parties ==
During the 1720s, they became famous for throwing sumptuous parties, a tradition that continued for several decades; these were attended even by her husband's political opponents.
