= Vincent Cartwright Vickers =

British economist and author and illustrator of children's books (1879–1939)

Vincent Cartwright Vickers DL
- Born: Vincent Cartwright Vickers; 16 January 1879
- Died: 3 November 1939 (aged 60)
- Occupations: Banker, economist, director and illustrator/writer
- Relatives: James Campbell (potter), Col.Thomas Vickers, Edward Vickers
- Writing career
- Pen name: V.C.Vickers
- Genre: Children's
- Notable work: The Google Book

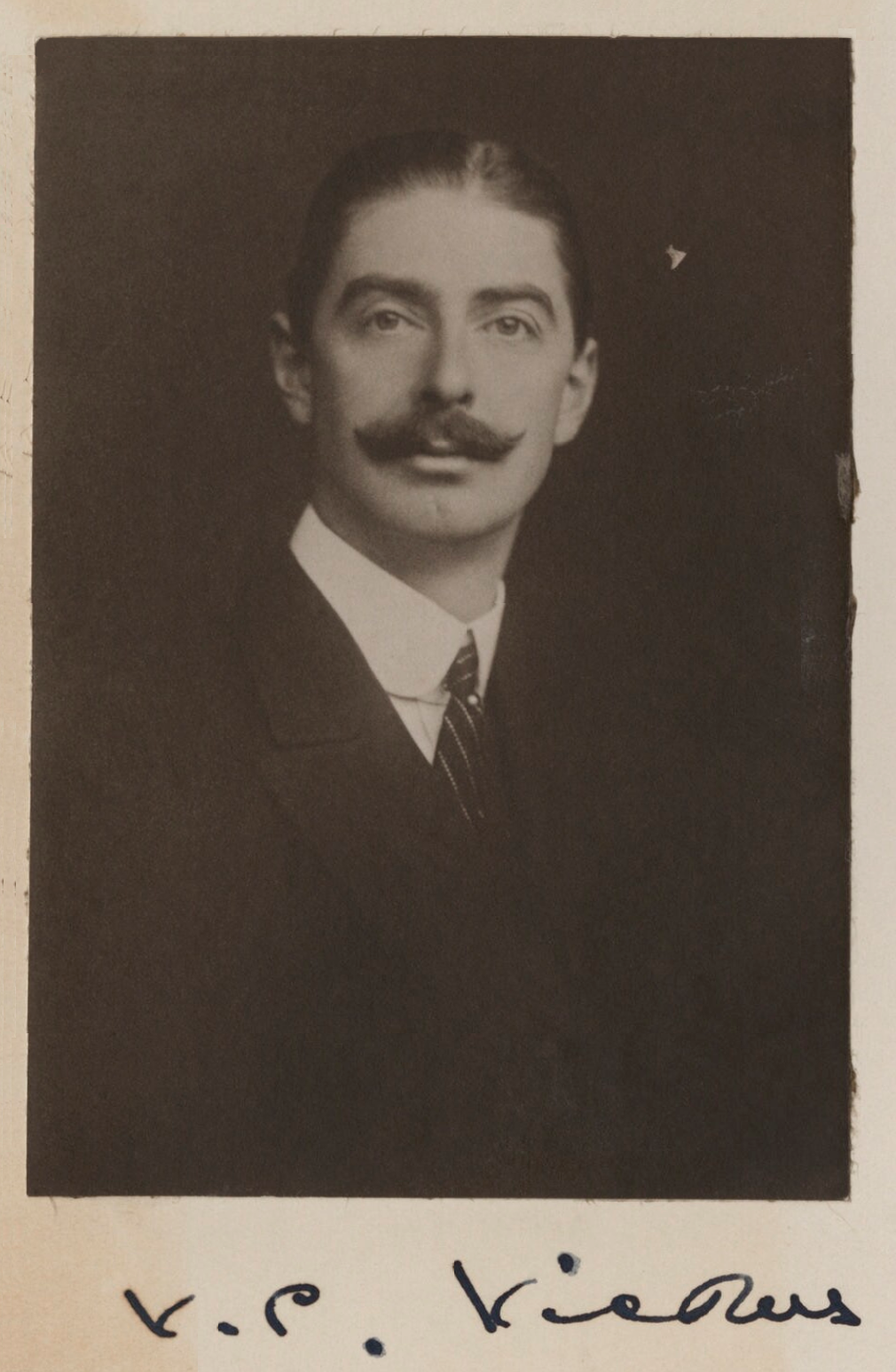
Portrait of Vincent Cartwright Vickers, platinum print, circa 1910.

Vincent Cartwright Vickers (16 January 1879 – 3 November 1939), was an economist, Deputy Lieutenant of the City of London, director of Vickers Limited and London Assurance. Between 1910 and 1919 he was a Governor of the Bank of England, and later became President of the Economic Reform Club and Institute (ECRI).

== Early life ==
He was the son of Albert Vickers (1838–1919) and Edith. He was educated at the Eton and Magdalen College, in Oxford.

== Career ==
He also worked as a humorist and artist. He wrote and illustrated The Google Book while serving as a director of the Bank of England.
