= The Fourth Plague =

1913 novel by Edgar Wallace

- Author: Edgar Wallace
- Language: English
- Genre: Thriller
- Publication date: 1913
- Publication place: United Kingdom
- Media type: Print

The Fourth Plague is a 1913 thriller novel by British writer Edgar Wallace.

== Plot synopsis ==
An Italian criminal organisation, The Red Hand, threaten to release a deadly plague on Britain if their financial demands are not met.

== Sources ==
- Clark, Neil. Stranger than Fiction: The Life of Edgar Wallace, the Man Who Created King Kong. The History Press, 2015.
