= The Google Book =

1913 illustrated children's book

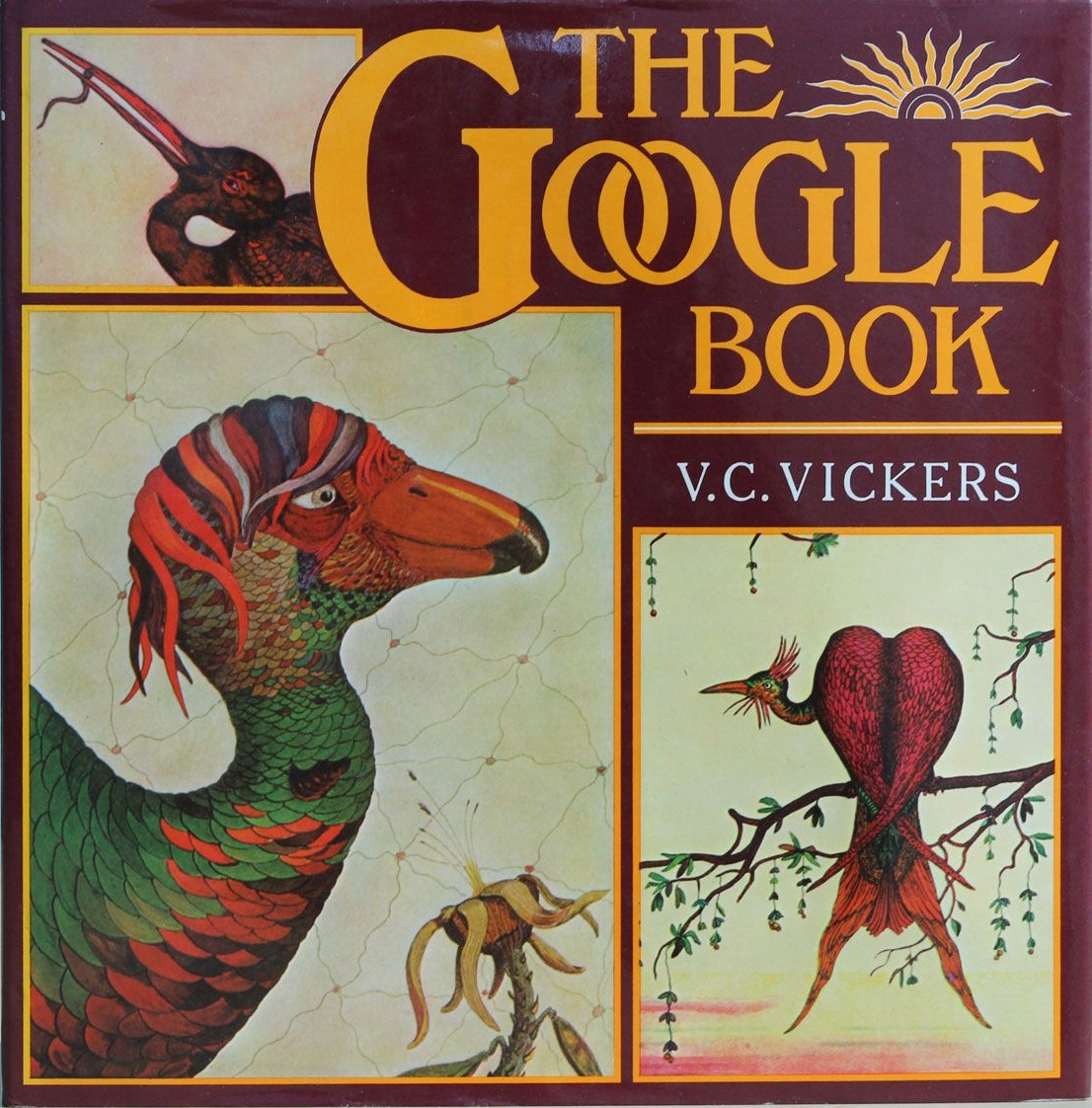
Hardcover of the book

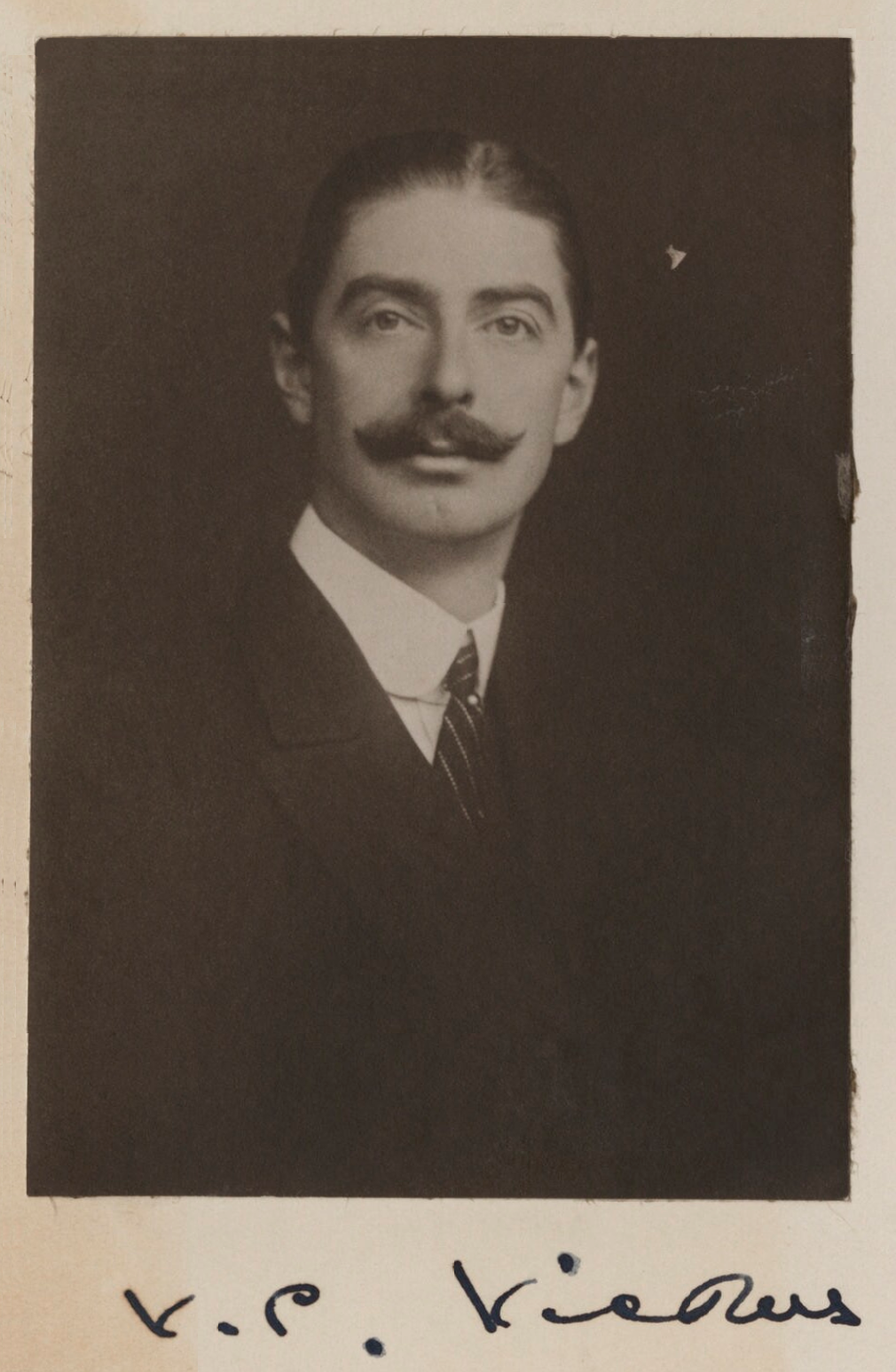
Portrait of Vincent Cartwright Vickers, platinum print, c. 1910

The Google Book is an illustrated book of children's verse by Vincent Cartwright Vickers.

== The original 1913 limited edition ==
Originally published in 1913 by J. & E. Bumpus, Limited, London, at Vickers' expense in a limited edition of 100 copies. The book has surrealist illustrations of various imaginary birds, such as the Poggle and the Swank, alongside short poems about them. The Google of the title is a strange creature that lives in a pool in a beautiful garden and at night prowls the land where the birds live.

== The 1931 trade edition ==
This was issued in a trade edition by the Medici Society in London in 1931. 'This version was a selection of the original poems and images, losing eight spreads'.

== The 1979 edition ==
This was published by Oxford University Press in 1979. This slimmed down version removed a further three images.

== The 2019 expanded edition ==
The book was published again in 2019 by Ecen Books. This version contains more illustrations than any earlier version. Research for this version was carried out by Andrew Brain and Gareth Monger. Additional images and verses not used in previous editions were included in this expanded version. The foreword was written by V. C. Vickers' grandson, James Campbell (potter) (1942–2019) on 5 October 2019. He died two months later.

The coincidence of the name being the same as Google, the well-known internet corporation, has stimulated comment.

== About the author ==
Vincent Cartwright Vickers (16 January 1879 – 3 November 1939) was an English economist, Deputy Lieutenant of the City of London, director of Vickers Limited and London Assurance. His father was Albert Vickers. He was educated at the Eton and Magdalen College, in Oxford. In 1905 he married 1. Maurice Kerr-Clerk (died 1989), 2. Nannetie Leslie. He had two sons and four daughters. Between 1910 and 1919 he was a Governor of the Bank of England, and later became President of the Economic Reform Club and Institute (ECRI).

He also worked as a humorist and artist. He wrote and illustrated The Google Book published in 1913 while serving as a governor of the Bank of England. A grandson, James Campbell (potter), wrote the foreword to the 2019 expanded version of The Google Book.

== Gallery ==
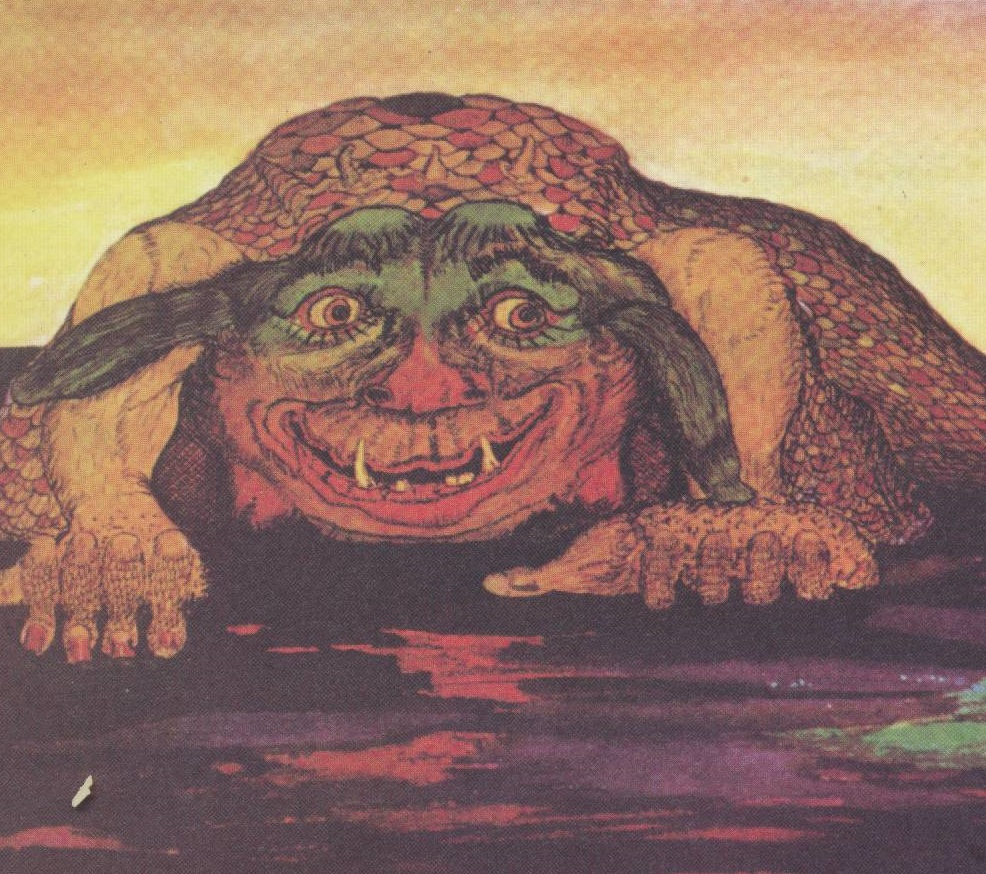
The Google

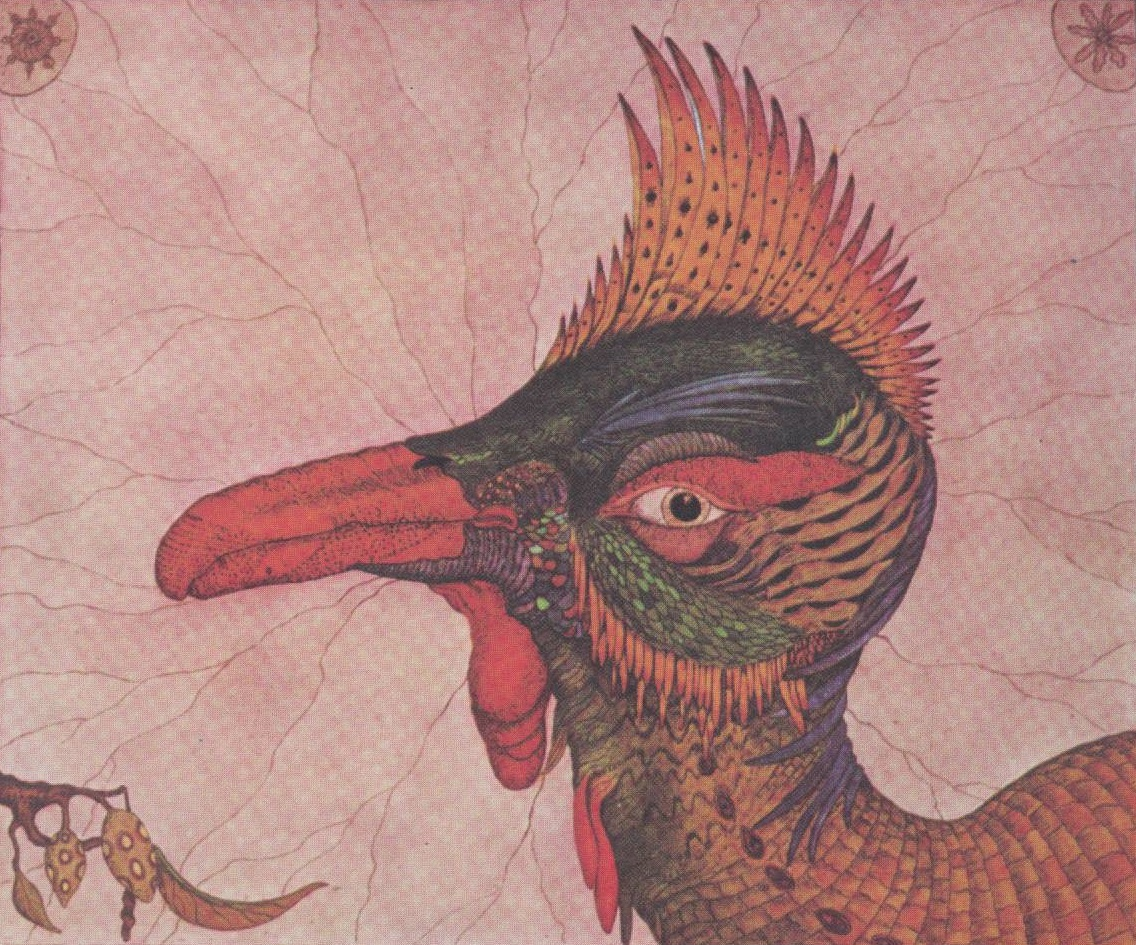
The Sun Bird

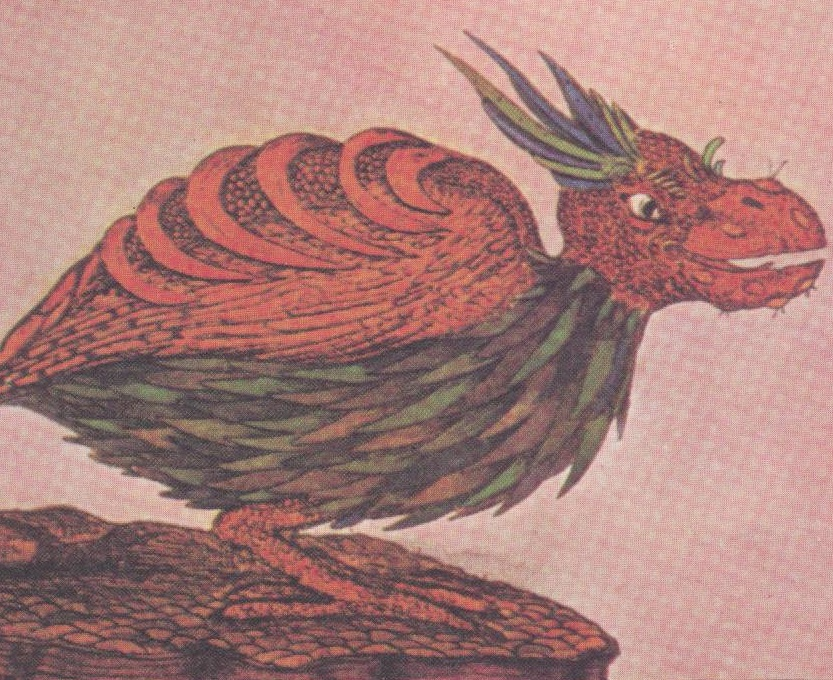
The Poggle

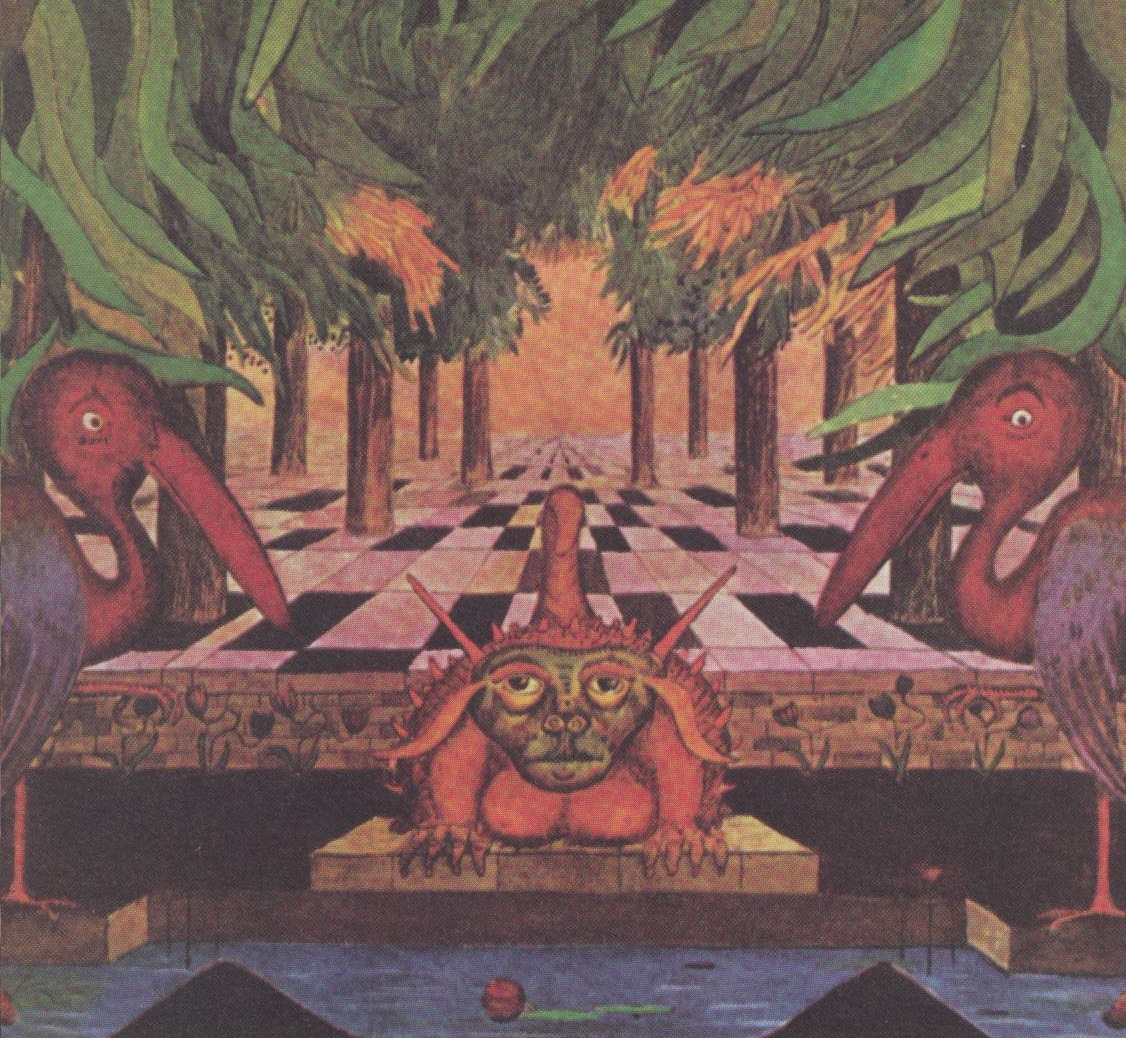
The Google's Garden
