= Benjamin Disraeli =

Prime Minister of the United Kingdom (1868; 1874–1880)

The Right Honourable The Earl of Beaconsfield KG PC DL JP FRS
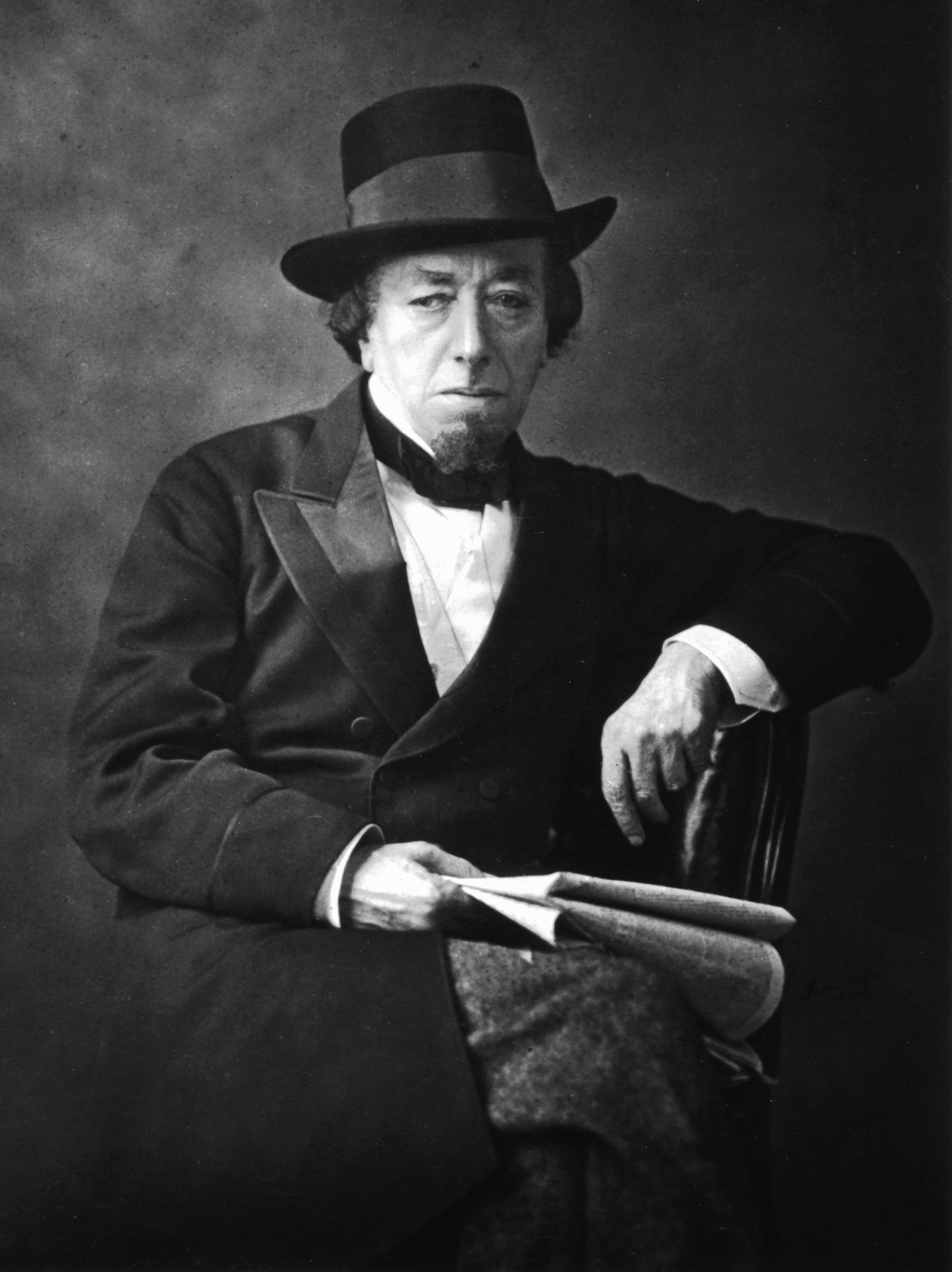
- Disraeli in 1878

Prime Minister of the United Kingdom
- In office 20 February 1874 – 21 April 1880
- Monarch: Victoria
- Preceded by: William Ewart Gladstone
- Succeeded by: William Ewart Gladstone
- In office 27 February 1868 – 1 December 1868
- Monarch: Victoria
- Preceded by: The Earl of Derby
- Succeeded by: William Ewart Gladstone

Leader of the Opposition
- In office 21 April 1880 – 19 April 1881
- Monarch: Victoria
- Prime Minister: William Ewart Gladstone
- Preceded by: Marquess of Hartington
- Succeeded by: The Marquess of Salisbury
- In office 1 December 1868 – 17 February 1874
- Monarch: Victoria
- Prime Minister: William Ewart Gladstone
- Preceded by: William Ewart Gladstone
- Succeeded by: William Ewart Gladstone

Chancellor of the Exchequer
- In office 6 July 1866 – 29 February 1868
- Prime Minister: The Earl of Derby
- Preceded by: William Ewart Gladstone
- Succeeded by: George Ward Hunt
- In office 26 February 1858 – 11 June 1859
- Prime Minister: The Earl of Derby
- Preceded by: Sir George Cornewall Lewis
- Succeeded by: William Ewart Gladstone
- In office 27 February 1852 – 17 December 1852
- Prime Minister: The Earl of Derby
- Preceded by: Sir Charles Wood, 3rd Baronet
- Succeeded by: William Ewart Gladstone

Personal details
- Born: Benjamin D'Israeli; 21 December 1804 Bloomsbury, Middlesex, England
- Died: 19 April 1881 (aged 76) Mayfair, London, England
- Party: Conservative
- Other political affiliations: Young England (1840s)
- Spouse: Mary Anne Evans (m. 1839; died 1872)
- Parents: Isaac D'Israeli; Maria Basevi
- Writing career
- Notable work: List: Vivian Grey; Popanilla; The Young Duke; Contarini Fleming; Ixion in Heaven; The Wondrous Tale of Alroy; The Rise of Iskander; The Infernal Marriage; Henrietta Temple; Venetia; Coningsby; Sybil; Tancred; Lothair; Endymion

Benjamin Disraeli, 1st Earl of Beaconsfield (born Benjamin D'Israeli; 21 December 1804 – 19 April 1881), was a British statesman, Conservative politician and writer who twice served as Prime Minister of the United Kingdom. He played a central role in the creation of the modern Conservative Party, defining its policies and its broad outreach. Disraeli is remembered for his influential voice in world affairs, his political battles with the Liberal Party leader William Ewart Gladstone, and his one-nation conservatism or "Tory democracy". He made the Conservatives the party most identified with the British Empire and military action to expand it, both of which were popular among British voters. He is the only British prime minister to have been ethnically Jewish.

Disraeli was born in Bloomsbury, at that time a part of Middlesex. His father left Judaism after a dispute at his synagogue; Benjamin became an Anglican at the age of 11. After several unsuccessful attempts, Disraeli entered the House of Commons in 1837. In 1846, Prime Minister Robert Peel split the party over his proposal to repeal the Corn Laws, which involved ending the tariff on imported grain. Disraeli clashed with Peel in the House of Commons, becoming a major figure in the party. When Lord Derby, the party leader, thrice formed governments in the 1850s and 1860s, Disraeli served as Chancellor of the Exchequer and Leader of the House of Commons.

Upon Derby's retirement in 1868, Disraeli became prime minister briefly before losing that year's general election. He returned to the opposition before leading the party to a majority in the 1874 general election. He maintained a close friendship with Queen Victoria who, in 1876, elevated him to the peerage as Earl of Beaconsfield. Disraeli's second term was dominated by the Eastern question—the slow decay of the Ottoman Empire and the desire of other European powers, such as Russia, to gain at its expense. Disraeli arranged for the British to purchase a major interest in the Suez Canal Company in Egypt. In 1878, faced with Russian victories against the Ottomans, he worked at the Congress of Berlin to obtain peace in the Balkans at terms favourable to Britain and unfavourable to Russia, its longstanding enemy. This diplomatic victory established Disraeli as one of Europe's leading statesmen.

World events thereafter moved against the Conservatives. Controversial wars in Afghanistan and South Africa undermined his public support. He angered farmers by refusing to reinstitute the Corn Laws in response to poor harvests and cheap imported grain. With Gladstone conducting a massive speaking campaign, the Liberals defeated Disraeli's Conservatives at the 1880 general election. In his final months, Disraeli led the Conservatives in opposition. Disraeli wrote novels throughout his career, beginning in 1826, and published his last completed novel, Endymion, shortly before he died at the age of 76.

== Early life ==
=== Childhood ===
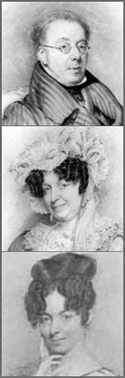
Disraeli's father, mother and sister—Isaac, Maria and Sarah

Benjamin D'Israeli was born on 21 December 1804 at 6 King's Road, Bedford Row, Bloomsbury, London, (Note: The street was renamed some time after 1824 as Theobald's Road; a commemorative plaque marks the current 22 Theobald's Road as Disraeli's birthplace.) the second child and eldest son of Isaac D'Israeli, a literary critic and historian, and Maria (Miriam), née Basevi. The family was of Sephardic Jewish mercantile background, (Note: Both Disraeli's grandfathers were born in Italy; Isaac's father, Benjamin, moved in 1748 from Venice to England. His second wife, Disraeli's grandmother, was Sarah Shiprut de Gabay Villareal. The maternal grandfather, Naphtali Basevi from Verona, settled in London in 1762. He married in 1767 Rebecca Rieti, born in England, the daughter of Sarah Cardoso and granddaughter of Jacob Aboab Cardoso who was already born in London (from this line, Disraeli had already four generations born in Britain).) with some Ashkenazi Jewish ancestors. He later romanticised his origins, claiming his father's family was of grand Spanish and Venetian descent; in fact, Isaac's family was of no great distinction, but on Disraeli's mother's side, in which he took no interest, there were some distinguished forebears, including Isaac Cardoso, as well as members of the Goldsmids, the Mocattas and the Montefiores. (Note: Disraeli's mother's ancestors included Isaac Aboab, the last Gaon of Castille, the Cardoso family (among whose members were Isaac Cardoso and Miguel Cardoso) and other prominent families; Disraeli was described in The Times as having "some of the best blood in Jewry".) Historians differ on Disraeli's motives for rewriting his family history: Bernard Glassman argues that it was intended to give him status comparable to that of England's ruling elite; Sarah Bradford believes "his dislike of the commonplace would not allow him to accept the facts of his birth as being as middle-class and undramatic as they really were".

Disraeli's siblings were Sarah, Naphtali (born and died 1807), Ralph and James ("Jem"). He was close to his sister and on affectionate but more distant terms with his surviving brothers. Details of his schooling are sketchy. From the age of about six he was a day boy at a dame school in Islington, which one of his biographers described as "for those days a very high-class establishment". (Note: Monypenny gives his age as "six or earlier"; Parry concurs, giving his first year at Miss Roper's as 1810 or 1811; Hibbert and Ridley give his age unequivocally as six. Kuhn puts his starting age as early as four.) Two years later or so—the exact date has not been ascertained—he was sent as a boarder to Rev John Potticary's school at Blackheath (now St Piran's, Maidenhead, Berkshire).

Following a quarrel in 1813 with the Bevis Marks Synagogue, his father renounced Judaism and had the four children baptised into the Church of England. Isaac D'Israeli had never taken religion very seriously but had remained a observant member of the synagogue. Isaac's father, Benjamin, was a prominent and devout member; it was probably out of respect for him that Isaac did not leave when he fell out with the synagogue authorities in 1813. (Note: Isaac was elected, without his consent, as Warden (parnas) of the synagogue. He refused the post, partly lest it interfere with his literary research and partly because he was ideologically much more liberal than the ruling orthodox group. Under the synagogue's rules he became liable for a fine of £40 for declining to serve. He refused to pay. After Benjamin senior died in 1816, Isaac felt free to leave the congregation following a second dispute.) Isaac's friend Sharon Turner, a solicitor, convinced him that although he could comfortably remain unattached to any formal religion it would be disadvantageous to the children if they did so. Turner stood as godfather when Benjamin was baptised, aged twelve, on 31 July 1817.

Conversion enabled Disraeli to contemplate a career in politics. There had been members of parliament (MPs) from Jewish families since Sampson Gideon in 1770. However, until the Jews Relief Act 1858, MPs were required to take the oath of allegiance "on the true faith of a Christian", necessitating at least nominal conversion. It is not known whether Disraeli formed any ambition for a parliamentary career at the time of his baptism, but there is no doubt that he bitterly regretted his parents' decision not to send him to Winchester College, one of the great public schools which consistently provided recruits to the political elite. His two younger brothers were sent there, and it is not clear why Isaac chose to send his eldest son to a much less prestigious school. The boy evidently held his mother responsible for the decision; Bradford speculates that "Benjamin's delicate health and his obviously Jewish appearance may have had something to do with it." The school chosen for him was run by Eliezer Cogan at Higham Hill in Walthamstow. He began there in the autumn term of 1817/

=== 1820s ===
In November 1821, shortly before his seventeenth birthday, Disraeli was articled as a clerk to a firm of solicitors—Swain, Stevens, Maples, Pearse and Hunt—in the City of London. T. F. Maples was not only the young Disraeli's employer and a friend of his father, but also his prospective father-in-law: Isaac and Maples considered that the latter's only daughter might be a suitable match for Benjamin. A friendship developed, but there was no romance. The firm had a large and profitable business, and as the biographer R. W. Davis observes, the clerkship was "the kind of secure, respectable position that many fathers dream of for their children". Although biographers including Robert Blake and Bradford comment that such a post was incompatible with Disraeli's romantic and ambitious nature, he reportedly gave his employers satisfactory service, and later professed to have learned much there. He recalled:

I had some scruples, for even then I dreamed of Parliament. My father's refrain always was 'Philip Carteret Webb', who was the most eminent solicitor of his boyhood and who was an MP. It would be a mistake to suppose that the two years and more that I was in the office of our friend were wasted. I have often thought, though I have often regretted the University, that it was much the reverse.

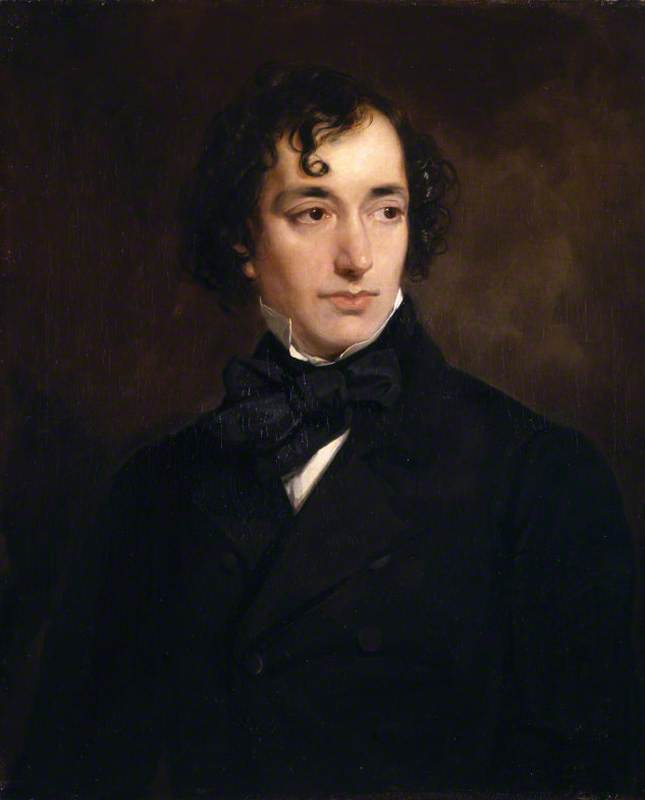
Portrait of Benjamin Disraeli by Francis Grant. Disraeli as a young man—a retrospective portrayal painted in 1852

The year after joining Maples' firm, Benjamin changed his surname from D'Israeli to Disraeli. His reasons are unknown, but the biographer Bernard Glassman surmises that it was to avoid being confused with his father. Disraeli's sister and brothers adopted the new version of the name; Isaac and his wife retained the older form. (Note: Some people, notably Disraeli's opponents, continued to include the apostrophe when writing his name. Lord Lincoln referred to "D'Israeli" in a letter to Sir Robert Peel in 1846. Peel followed suit. The Times took several years before it dropped the apostrophe and used Disraeli's spelling. Even in the 1870s, towards the end of Disraeli's career, the practice continued.)

Disraeli toured Belgium and the Rhine Valley with his father in the summer of 1824. He later wrote that while travelling on the Rhine he decided to abandon his position: "I determined when descending those magical waters that I would not be a lawyer." On their return to England he left the solicitors, at the suggestion of Maples, with the aim of qualifying as a barrister. He enrolled as a student at Lincoln's Inn and joined the chambers of his uncle, Nathaniel Basevy, and then those of Benjamin Austen, who persuaded Isaac that Disraeli would never make a barrister and should be allowed to pursue a literary career. He had made a tentative start: in May 1824 he submitted a manuscript to his father's friend, the publisher John Murray, but withdrew it before Murray could decide whether to publish it.

Released from the law, Disraeli did some work for Murray, but turned most of his attention to speculative dealing on the stock exchange. There was at the time a boom in shares in South American mining companies. Spain was losing its South American colonies in the face of rebellions. At the urging of George Canning the British government recognised the new independent governments of Argentina (1824), Colombia and Mexico (both 1825). With no money of his own, Disraeli borrowed money to invest. He became involved with the financier J. D. Powles, who was prominent among those encouraging the mining boom. In 1825, Disraeli wrote three anonymous pamphlets for Powles, promoting the companies. The pamphlets were published by John Murray, who invested heavily in the boom.

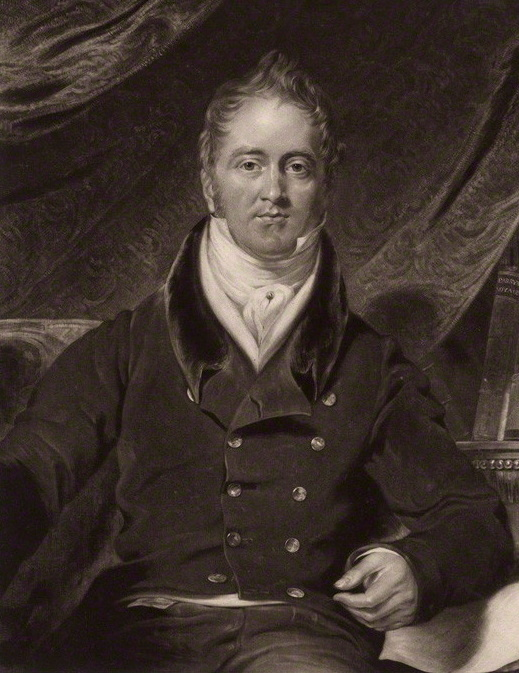
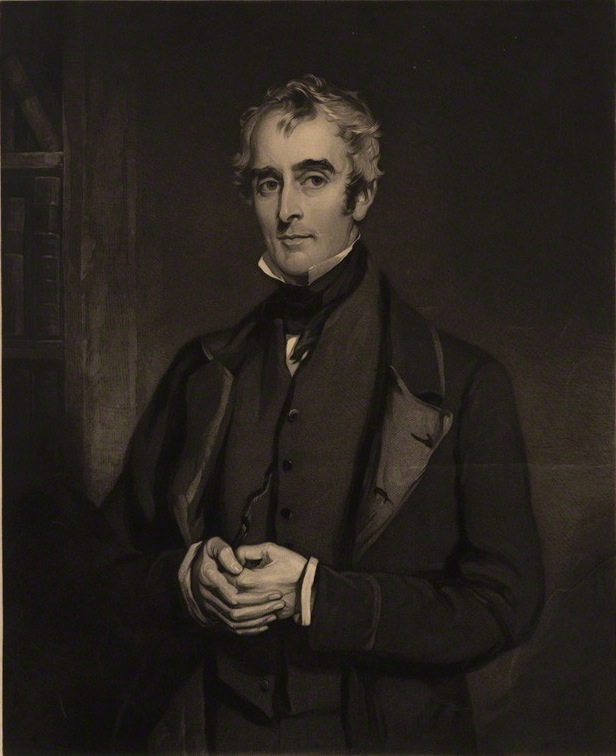
John Murray and J. G. Lockhart

Murray had ambitions to establish a new morning paper to compete with The Times. In 1825 Disraeli convinced him that he should proceed. The new paper, The Representative, promoted the mines and those politicians who supported them, particularly Canning. Disraeli impressed Murray with his energy and commitment to the project, but he failed in his key task of persuading the eminent writer John Gibson Lockhart to edit the paper. After that, Disraeli's influence on Murray waned, and to his resentment he was sidelined in the affairs of The Representative. The paper survived only six months, partly because the mining bubble burst in late 1825, and partly because, according to Blake, the paper was "atrociously edited".

The bursting of the mining bubble was ruinous for Disraeli. By June 1825 he and his business partners had lost £7,000. Disraeli could not pay off the last of his debts from this debacle until 1849. He turned to writing, motivated partly by his desperate need for money, and partly by a wish for revenge on Murray and others by whom he felt slighted. There was a vogue for what was called "silver-fork fiction"—novels depicting aristocratic life, usually by anonymous authors, read by the aspirational middle classes. Disraeli's first novel, Vivian Grey, published anonymously in four volumes in 1826–27, was a thinly veiled re-telling of the affair of The Representative. It sold well, but caused much offence in influential circles when the authorship was discovered. Disraeli, then just 23, did not move in high society, as the numerous solecisms in his book made obvious. Reviewers were sharply critical on these grounds of both the author and the book. Murray and Lockhart, men of great influence in literary circles, believed that Disraeli had caricatured them and abused their confidence—an accusation denied by the author but repeated by many of his biographers. In later editions Disraeli made many changes, softening his satire, but the damage to his reputation proved long-lasting.

Disraeli's biographer Jonathan Parry writes that the financial failure and personal criticism that Disraeli suffered in 1825 and 1826 were probably the trigger for a serious nervous crisis affecting him over the next four years: "He had always been moody, sensitive, and solitary by nature, but now became seriously depressed and lethargic." He was still living with his parents in London, but in search of the "change of air" recommended by the family's doctors, Isaac took a succession of houses in the country and on the coast, before Disraeli sought wider horizons.

=== 1830–1837 ===
Together with his sister's fiancé, William Meredith, Disraeli travelled widely in southern Europe and beyond in 1830–31. (Note: En route, the pair met Giovanni Battista Falcieri ("Tita"), Lord Byron's former manservant, who joined them and subsequently returned to England with Disraeli.) The trip was financed partly by another high society novel, The Young Duke, written in 1829–30. The tour was cut short suddenly by Meredith's death from smallpox in Cairo in July 1831. (Note: After Meredith's death, Sarah Disraeli never married. She devoted the rest of her life to her family.) Despite this tragedy, and the need for treatment for a sexually transmitted disease on his return, Disraeli felt enriched by his experiences. He became, in Parry's words, "aware of values that seemed denied to his insular countrymen. The journey encouraged his self-consciousness, his moral relativism, and his interest in Eastern racial and religious attitudes." Blake regards the tour as one of the formative experiences of Disraeli's career.

Disraeli wrote two novels in the aftermath of the tour. Contarini Fleming (1832) was avowedly a self-portrait. It is subtitled "a psychological autobiography" and depicts the conflicting elements of its hero's character: the duality of northern and Mediterranean ancestry, the dreaming artist and the bold man of action. As Parry observes, the book ends on a political note, setting out Europe's progress "from feudal to federal principles". The Wondrous Tale of Alroy the following year portrayed the problems of a medieval Jew in deciding between a small, exclusively Jewish state and a large empire embracing all.

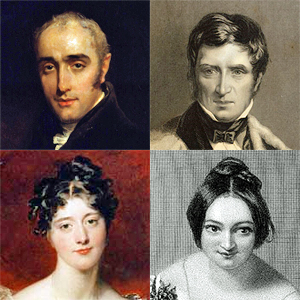
Friends and allies of Disraeli in the 1830s: clockwise from top left—Croker, Lyndhurst, Henrietta Sykes and Lady Londonderry

After these novels were published, Disraeli declared that he would "write no more about myself". He had already turned his attention to politics in 1832, during the great crisis over the Reform Bill. He contributed to an anti-Whig pamphlet edited by John Wilson Croker and published by Murray entitled England and France: or a cure for Ministerial Gallomania. The choice of a Tory publication was regarded as strange by Disraeli's friends and relatives, who thought him more of a Radical. Indeed, he had objected to Murray about Croker's inserting "high Tory" sentiment: Disraeli remarked, "it is quite impossible that anything adverse to the general measure of Reform can issue from my pen." (Note: At that time only about one in seven British men (and no women) were entitled to vote in general elections. Those arguing for reform wanted rationalisation and liberalisation of the property-holding qualifications necessary to be a voter, and elimination of the most unrepresentative constituencies in which the local landowner heavily-influenced the vote.) Moreover, at the time Gallomania was published, Disraeli was electioneering in High Wycombe in the Radical interest.

Disraeli's politics at the time were influenced both by his rebellious streak and his desire to make his mark. At that time, British politics were dominated by the aristocracy, with a few powerful commoners. The Whigs derived from the coalition of Lords who had forced through the Bill of Rights 1689 and in some cases were their descendants. The Tories tended to support King and Church and sought to thwart political change. A small number of Radicals, generally from northern constituencies, were the strongest advocates of continuing reform. In the early 1830s the Tories and the interests they represented appeared to be a lost cause. The other great party, the Whigs, were anathema to Disraeli: "Toryism is worn out & I cannot condescend to be a Whig." There was a by-election and a general election in 1832; Disraeli unsuccessfully stood as a Radical at High Wycombe in each.

Disraeli's political views embraced certain Radical policies, particularly electoral reform, and also some Tory ones, including protectionism. He began to move in Tory circles. In 1834 he was introduced to the former Lord Chancellor, Lord Lyndhurst, by Henrietta Sykes, wife of Sir Francis Sykes. She was having an affair with Lyndhurst and began another with Disraeli. (Note: Blake comments, "the true relationship between the three cannot be determined with certainty" but he, like later biographers including Bradford and Parry, is in no doubt that Henrietta and Disraeli conducted an affair. Bradford refers to the couple's "reckless openness".) Disraeli and Lyndhurst took an immediate liking to each other. Lyndhurst was an indiscreet gossip with a fondness for intrigue; this appealed greatly to Disraeli, who became his secretary and go-between. In 1835 Disraeli stood for the last time as a Radical, again unsuccessfully contesting High Wycombe.

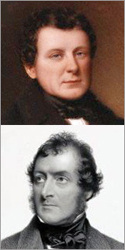
Opponents of Disraeli: O'Connell and Labouchere

In April 1835, Disraeli fought a by-election at Taunton as a Tory candidate. The Irish MP Daniel O'Connell, misled by inaccurate press reports, thought Disraeli had slandered him while electioneering at Taunton; he launched an outspoken attack, referring to Disraeli as:

a reptile ... just fit now, after being twice discarded by the people, to become a Conservative. He possesses all the necessary requisites of perfidy, selfishness, depravity, want of principle, etc., which would qualify him for the change. His name shows that he is of Jewish origin. I do not use it as a term of reproach; there are many most respectable Jews. But there are, as in every other people, some of the lowest and most disgusting grade of moral turpitude; and of those I look upon Mr. Disraeli as the worst.

Disraeli's public exchanges with O'Connell, extensively reproduced in The Times, included a demand for a duel with the 60-year-old O'Connell's son (which resulted in Disraeli's temporary detention by the authorities), a reference to "the inextinguishable hatred with which [he] shall pursue [O'Connell's] existence", and the accusation that O'Connell's supporters had a "princely revenue wrung from a starving race of fanatical slaves". Disraeli was highly gratified by the dispute, which propelled him to general public notice for the first time. He did not defeat the incumbent Whig member, Henry Labouchere, but the Taunton constituency was regarded as unwinnable by the Tories. Disraeli kept Labouchere's majority down to 170, a good showing that put him in line for a winnable seat in the near future.

With Lyndhurst's encouragement Disraeli turned to writing propaganda for his newly adopted party. His Vindication of the English Constitution, was published in December 1835. It was couched in the form of an open letter to Lyndhurst, and in Bradford's view encapsulates a political philosophy that Disraeli adhered to for the rest of his life: the value of benevolent aristocratic government, a loathing of political dogma, and the modernisation of Tory policies. The following year he wrote a series of satires on politicians of the day, which he published in The Times under the pen-name "Runnymede". His targets included the Whigs, collectively and individually, Irish nationalists, and political corruption. One essay ended:

The English nation, therefore, rallies for rescue from the degrading plots of a profligate oligarchy, a barbarizing sectarianism, and a boroughmongering Papacy, round their hereditary leaders—the Peers. The House of Lords, therefore, at this moment represents everything in the realm except the Whig oligarchs, their tools the Dissenters, and their masters the Irish priests. In the mean time, the Whigs bawl that there is a "collision!" It is true there is a collision, but it is not a collision between the Lords and the People, but between the Ministers and the Constitution.

Disraeli was elected to the exclusively Tory Carlton Club in 1836, and was also taken up by the party's leading hostess, Lady Londonderry. In June 1837 William IV died, the young Queen Victoria succeeded him, and parliament was dissolved. On the recommendation of the Carlton Club, Disraeli was adopted as a Tory parliamentary candidate at the ensuing general election.

== Parliament ==
=== Back-bencher ===
In the election in July 1837, Disraeli won a seat in the House of Commons as one of two members, both Tory, for the constituency of Maidstone. The other was Wyndham Lewis, who helped finance Disraeli's election campaign, and who died the following year. In the same year Disraeli published a novel, Henrietta Temple, which was a love story and social comedy, drawing on his affair with Henrietta Sykes. He had broken off the relationship in late 1836, distraught that she had taken yet another lover. His other novel of this period is Venetia, a romance based on the characters of Shelley and Byron, written quickly to raise much-needed money.

Disraeli made his maiden speech in Parliament on 7 December 1837. He followed O'Connell, whom he sharply criticised for the latter's "long, rambling, jumbling, speech". He was shouted down by O'Connell's supporters. (Note: The defiant closing words of his speech have been variously recorded. The Times's parliamentary reports were in the third person: its account is, "He would sit down now, but the time would come when they would hear him." Bradford gives his words as, "I sit down now, but the time must come when you will hear me." Blake has the words as, "I will sit down now, but the time will come when you will hear me.") After this unpromising start Disraeli kept a low profile for the rest of the parliamentary session. He was a loyal supporter of the party leader Sir Robert Peel and his policies, with the exception of a personal sympathy for the Chartist movement that most Tories did not share.

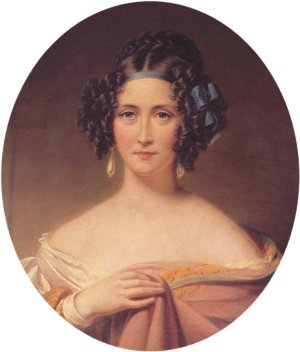
Mary Anne Lewis c. 1820–30

In 1839 Disraeli married Mary Anne Lewis, the widow of Wyndham Lewis. Twelve years Disraeli's senior, Mary Lewis had a substantial income of £5,000 a year. His motives were generally assumed to be mercenary, but the couple came to cherish one another, remaining close until she died more than three decades later. "Dizzy married me for my money", his wife said later, "But, if he had the chance again, he would marry me for love."

Finding the financial demands of his Maidstone seat too much, Disraeli secured a Tory nomination for Shrewsbury, winning one of the constituency's two seats at the 1841 general election, despite serious opposition, and heavy debts which opponents seized on. The election was a massive defeat for the Whigs across the country, and Peel became prime minister. Disraeli hoped, unrealistically, for ministerial office. (Note: Blake records later speculation that Disraeli's exclusion was due to the scandal of his affair with Henrietta Sykes or to Lord Stanley's suspicion of him. Blake's view is that at this point in his career Disraeli was simply too junior and lacking in political clout to qualify for office. Peel had so many party grandees to accommodate that there was never any question of finding room for Disraeli.) Though disappointed at being left on the back benches, he continued his support for Peel in 1842 and 1843, seeking to establish himself as an expert on foreign affairs and international trade.

Although a Tory (or Conservative, as some in the party now called themselves) (Note: The term "Conservative" had been increasingly used since the early 1830s, and was actively promoted by the party in the 1837 elections. The two terms were used concurrently thereafter, but in the 1840s they were not always seen as interchangeable. The historian Roy Douglas writes, "Perhaps the safest way to think about party origins is to consider that, around 1830, the Whig and Tory Parties both began to disintegrate, and it was not until the late 1860s that the Liberal and Conservative Parties had come into existence in a fully recognisable form." In the 1840s Disraeli applied the term "Conservatives" to the Peelites as opposed to the Tories from whom Peel had seceded.) Disraeli was sympathetic to some of the aims of Chartism, and argued for an alliance between the landed aristocracy and the working class against the increasing power of the merchants and new industrialists in the middle class. After Disraeli won widespread acclaim in March 1842 for worsting Lord Palmerston in debate, he was taken up by a small group of idealistic new Tory MPs, with whom he formed the Young England group. They held that the landed interests should use their power to protect the poor from exploitation by middle-class businessmen.

Disraeli hoped to forge a paternalistic Tory-Radical alliance, but he was unsuccessful. Before the Reform Act 1867, the working class did not possess the vote and therefore had little political power. Although Disraeli forged a personal friendship with John Bright, a leading Radical, Disraeli was unable to persuade Bright to sacrifice his distinct position for parliamentary advancement. When Disraeli attempted to secure a Tory-Radical cabinet in 1852, Bright refused. (Note: The specific occasion was the 1852 Budget. Disraeli seems to have held out the possibility that Bright, Richard Cobden and Thomas Milner Gibson might eventually join the cabinet in exchange for the support of the Radicals.)

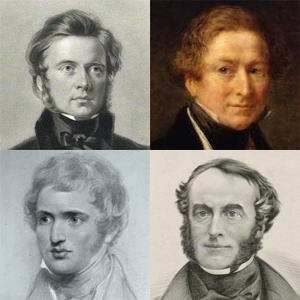
Clockwise from top left: Bright, Peel, Bentinck and Stanley

Disraeli gradually became a sharp critic of Peel's government, often deliberately taking contrary positions. The young MP attacked his leader as early as 1843. However, the best known of these stances were over the Maynooth Grant in 1845 and the repeal of the Corn Laws in 1846. The president of the Board of Trade, William Gladstone, resigned from the cabinet over the Maynooth Grant. The Corn Laws imposed a tariff on imported wheat, protecting British farmers from foreign competition, but making the cost of bread artificially high. Peel hoped that the repeal of the Corn Laws and the resultant influx of cheaper wheat into Britain would relieve the condition of the poor, and in particular the Great Famine caused by the failure of potato crops in Ireland. (Note: According to some modern historians, Peel recognised the inevitability of free trade and used the alleviation of the Irish famine as a convenient pretext for moving away from protectionism despite strong opposition from within his party.)

The first months of 1846 were dominated by a battle in Parliament between the free traders and the protectionists over the repeal of the Corn Laws, with the latter rallying around Disraeli and Lord George Bentinck. An alliance of free-trade Conservatives (the "Peelites"), Radicals, and Whigs carried repeal, and the Conservative Party split: the Peelites moved towards the Whigs, while a "new" Conservative Party formed around the protectionists, led by Disraeli, Bentinck, and Lord Stanley (later Lord Derby).

The split in the Tory party over the repeal of the Corn Laws had profound implications for Disraeli's political career: almost every Tory politician with experience of office followed Peel, leaving the rump bereft of leadership. In Blake's words, "[Disraeli] found himself almost the only figure on his side capable of putting up the oratorical display essential for a parliamentary leader." The Duke of Argyll wrote that Disraeli "was like a subaltern in a great battle where every superior officer was killed or wounded". If the Tory party could muster the electoral support necessary to form a government, then Disraeli now seemed to be guaranteed high office, but with a group of men who possessed little or no official experience and who, as a group, remained hostile to Disraeli. In the event the Tory split soon had the party out of office, not regaining power until 1852. The Conservatives would not again have a majority in the House of Commons until 1874.

=== Bentinck and the leadership ===
Peel successfully steered the repeal of the Corn Laws through Parliament and was then defeated by an alliance of his enemies; he resigned in June 1846. The Tories remained split, and the Queen sent for Lord John Russell, the Whig leader. In the 1847 general election, Disraeli stood, successfully, for the Buckinghamshire constituency. The new House of Commons had more Conservative than Whig members, but the depth of the Tory schism enabled Russell to continue to govern. The Conservatives were led by Bentinck in the Commons and Stanley in the Lords.

Clockwise from top left: Russell, Rothschild, Manners and Granby

In 1847 a small political crisis removed Bentinck from the leadership and highlighted Disraeli's differences with his own party. In that year's general election, Lionel de Rothschild had been returned for the City of London. As a Jew he could not in good faith take the oath of allegiance in the prescribed form, and could not take his seat. Russell proposed in the Commons that the oath should be amended to permit Jews to enter Parliament.

Disraeli spoke in favour of the measure, arguing that Christianity was "completed Judaism", and asking the House of Commons "Where is your Christianity if you do not believe in their Judaism?" Russell and Disraeli's future rival Gladstone thought this brave; the speech was badly received by his own party. The Tories and the Anglican establishment were hostile to the bill. With the exception of Disraeli, every member of the future protectionist cabinet then in Parliament voted against the measure. The measure was voted down. In the aftermath of the debate Bentinck resigned the leadership and was succeeded by Lord Granby; Disraeli's speech ruled him out as leader for the time being.

While these intrigues played out, Disraeli was working with the Bentinck family to secure the necessary financing to purchase Hughenden Manor, in Buckinghamshire. The possession of a country house and incumbency of a county constituency were regarded as essential for a Tory with leadership ambitions. Disraeli and his wife alternated between Hughenden and several homes in London for the rest of their marriage. The negotiations were complicated by Bentinck's sudden death on 21 September 1848, but Disraeli obtained a loan of £25,000 from Bentinck's brothers Lord Henry Bentinck and Lord Titchfield. Within a month of his appointment Granby resigned the leadership in the Commons and the party functioned without a leader in the Commons for the rest of the session. At the start of the next session, affairs were handled by a triumvirate of Granby, Disraeli, and John Charles Herries—indicative of the tension between Disraeli and the rest of the party, who needed his talents but mistrusted him. This confused arrangement ended with Granby's resignation in 1851.

== Chancellor of the Exchequer ==
=== First Derby government ===
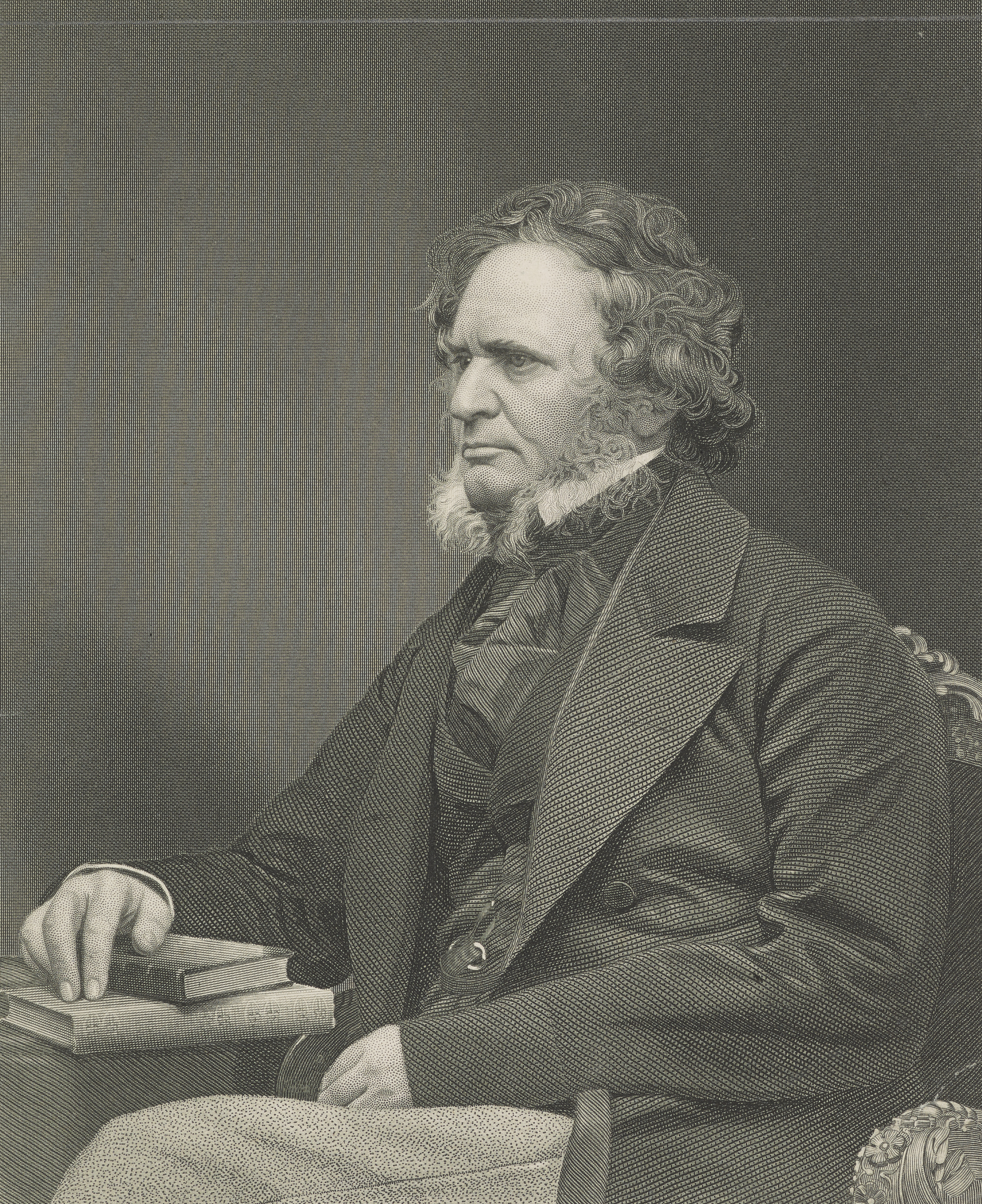
The Earl of Derby, Prime Minister 1852, 1858–59, 1866–68

In March 1851, Lord John Russell's government was defeated over a bill to equalise the qualifications to vote for the county and borough seats in the Commons, mostly because of divisions among his supporters. He resigned, and the Queen sent for Stanley, who felt that a minority government could do little and would not last long, so Russell remained in office. Disraeli regretted this, hoping for an opportunity, however brief, to show himself capable in office. Stanley, in contrast, stated that the inexperience of his followers was a reason for not assuming office: "These are not names I can put before the Queen."

At the end of June 1851, Stanley succeeded to the title of Earl of Derby. The Whigs were wracked by internal dissensions during the second half of 1851, much of which Parliament spent in recess. Russell dismissed Palmerston from the cabinet, leaving the latter determined to deprive the prime minister of office, and did so within weeks of Parliament's reassembly on 4 February 1852, his followers combining with Disraeli's Tories to defeat the government on a Militia Bill. Derby had either to take office or risk damage to his reputation, and he accepted the Queen's commission as prime minister. Palmerston declined any office; Derby had hoped to have him as Chancellor of the Exchequer. Disraeli, his closest ally, was his second choice and accepted, though disclaiming any great knowledge in the financial field. Gladstone refused to join the government. Disraeli may have been attracted to the office by the £5,000 annual salary, which would help pay his debts. Few of the new cabinet had held office before; when Derby tried to inform the Duke of Wellington of the names of the ministers, the old Duke, who was somewhat deaf, inadvertently branded the new government by incredulously repeating "Who? Who?"

In the following weeks, Disraeli served as Leader of the House (with Derby as prime minister in the Lords) and as chancellor. He wrote regular reports on proceedings in the Commons to Victoria, who described them as "very curious" and "much in the style of his books". Parliament was prorogued on 1 July 1852 as the Tories could not govern for long as a minority; Disraeli hoped that they would gain a majority of about 40. Instead, the election later that month had no clear winner, and the Derby government held to power pending the meeting of Parliament.

=== Budget ===
Disraeli's task as chancellor was to devise a budget which would satisfy the protectionist elements who supported the Tories, without uniting the free-traders against it. His proposed budget, which he presented to the Commons on 3 December, lowered the taxes on malt and tea, provisions designed to appeal to the working class. To make his budget revenue-neutral, as funds were needed to provide defences against the French, he doubled the house tax and continued the income tax. Disraeli's overall purpose was to enact policies which would benefit the working classes, making his party more attractive to them. Although the budget did not contain protectionist features, the opposition was prepared to destroy it—and Disraeli's career as Chancellor—in part to avenge for his actions against Peel in 1846. MP Sidney Herbert predicted that the budget would fail because "Jews make no converts".

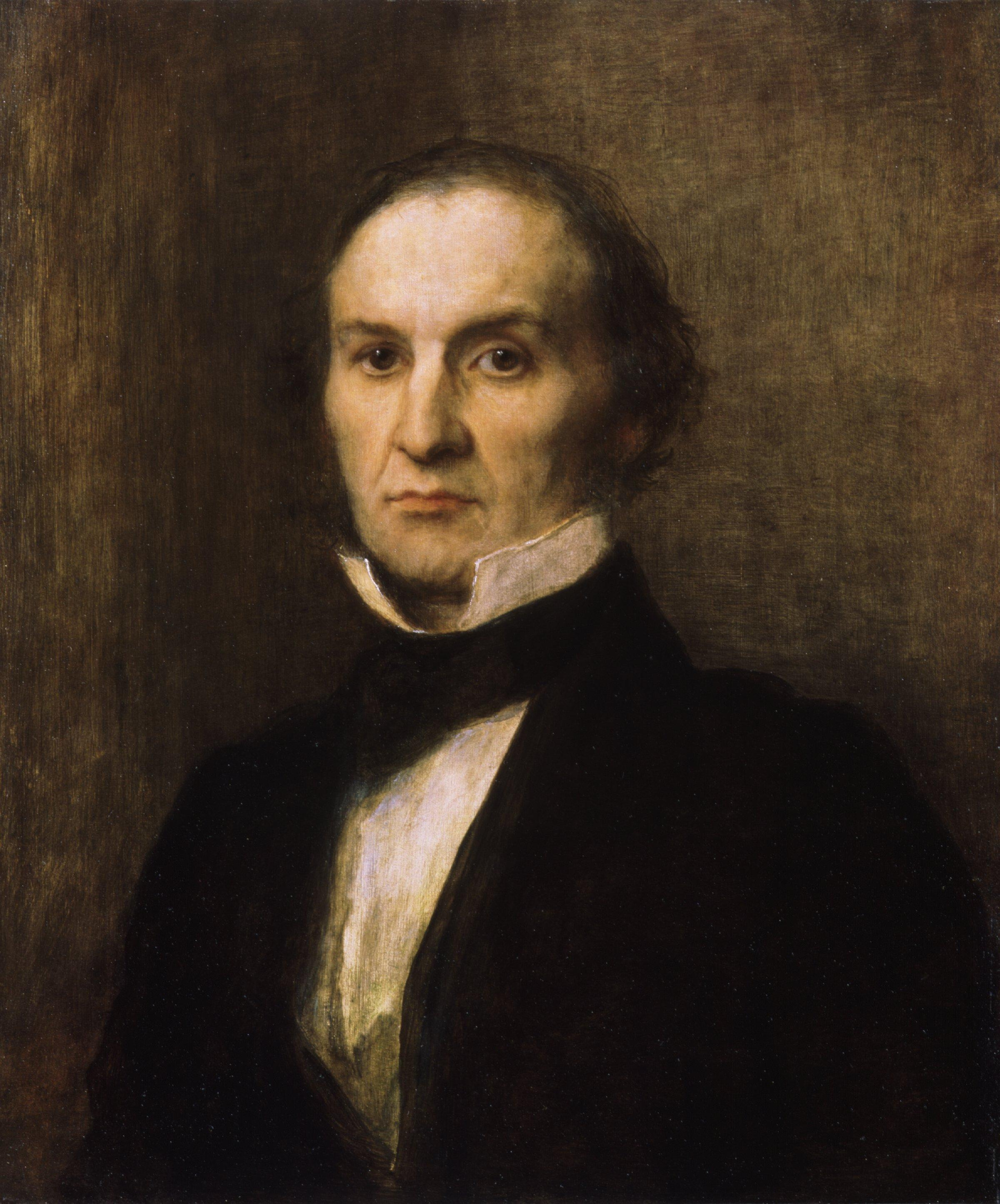
Gladstone in the 1850s

Disraeli delivered the budget on 3 December 1852, and prepared to wind up the debate for the government on 16 December—it was customary for the Chancellor to have the last word. A massive defeat for the government was predicted. Disraeli attacked his opponents individually, and then as a force: "I face a Coalition ... This, too, I know, that England does not love coalitions." His speech of three hours was quickly seen as a parliamentary masterpiece. As MPs prepared to divide, Gladstone rose to his feet and began an angry speech, despite the efforts of Tory MPs to shout him down. The interruptions were fewer, as Gladstone gained control of the House, and in the next two hours painted a picture of Disraeli as frivolous and his budget as subversive. The government was defeated by 19 votes, and Derby resigned four days later. He was replaced by the Peelite Earl of Aberdeen, with Gladstone as his Chancellor. No party reconciliation was possible while he remained Tory leader in the Commons.

=== Opposition ===
With the fall of the government, Disraeli and the Conservatives returned to the opposition benches, where he would spend three-quarters of his 44-year parliamentary career. Derby was reluctant to seek to unseat the government, fearing a repetition of the Who? Who? Ministry and aware that dislike of Disraeli was part of what united the new government. Disraeli, on the other hand, was anxious to return to office. In the interim, Disraeli, as Conservative leader in the Commons, opposed the government on all major measures.

In June 1853 Disraeli was awarded an honorary degree by the University of Oxford. He had been recommended for it by Lord Derby, the university's Chancellor. The start of the Crimean War in 1854 caused a lull in party politics; Disraeli spoke patriotically in support. The British military efforts were marked by bungling, and in 1855 a restive Parliament considered a resolution to establish a committee on the conduct of the war. The Aberdeen government made this a motion of confidence; Disraeli led the opposition to defeat the government, 305 to 148. Aberdeen resigned, and the Queen sent for Derby, who to Disraeli's frustration refused to take office. Palmerston was deemed essential to any Whig ministry, and he would not join any he did not head. The Queen reluctantly asked Palmerston to form a government. Under Palmerston, the war went better, and was ended by the Treaty of Paris in early 1856. Disraeli was early to call for peace but had little influence on events.

When a rebellion broke out in India in 1857, Disraeli took a keen interest, having been a member of a select committee in 1852 which considered how best to rule the subcontinent, and had proposed eliminating the governing role of the British East India Company. After peace was restored, and Palmerston in early 1858 brought in legislation for direct rule of India by the Crown, Disraeli opposed it. Many Conservative MPs refused to follow him, and the bill passed the Commons easily.

Palmerston's grip on the premiership was weakened by his response to the Orsini affair, in which an attempt was made to assassinate the French Emperor Napoleon III by an Italian revolutionary with a bomb made in Birmingham. At the request of the French ambassador, Palmerston proposed amending the conspiracy to murder statute to make creating an infernal device a felony. He was defeated by 19 votes on the second reading, with many Liberals crossing the aisle against him. He immediately resigned, and Lord Derby returned to office.

=== Second Derby government ===
Derby took office at the head of a purely "Conservative" administration, not in coalition. He again offered a place to Gladstone, who declined. Disraeli was once more leader of the House of Commons and returned to the Exchequer. As in 1852, Derby led a minority government, dependent on the division of its opponents for survival. As Leader of the House, Disraeli resumed his regular reports to Queen Victoria, who had requested that he include what she "could not meet in newspapers".

During its brief life of just over a year, the Derby government proved moderately progressive. The Government of India Act 1858 ended the role of the East India Company in governing the subcontinent. The Thames Purification Bill funded the construction of much larger sewers for London. Disraeli had supported efforts to allow Jews to sit in Parliament with a bill passed through the Commons allowing each house of Parliament to determine what oaths its members should take. This was grudgingly agreed to by the House of Lords, with a minority of Conservatives joining with the opposition to pass it. In 1858, Baron Lionel de Rothschild became the first MP to profess the Jewish faith.

Faced with a vacancy, (Note: Lord Ellenborough, the president of the Board of Control, had resigned amid a political crisis about his supervision of the governing of India.) Disraeli and Derby tried yet again to bring Gladstone, still nominally a Conservative MP, into the government, hoping to strengthen it. Disraeli wrote a personal letter to Gladstone, asking him to place the good of the party above personal animosity: "Every man performs his office, and there is a Power, greater than ourselves, that disposes of all this." In response, Gladstone denied that personal feelings played any role in his decisions then and previously whether to accept office, while acknowledging that there were differences between him and Derby "broader than you may have supposed".

The Tories pursued a Reform Bill in 1859, which would have resulted in a modest increase to the franchise. The Liberals were healing the breaches between those who favoured Russell and the Palmerston loyalists, and in late March 1859, the government was defeated on a Russell-sponsored amendment. Derby dissolved Parliament, and the ensuing general election resulted in modest Tory gains, but not enough to control the Commons. When Parliament assembled, Derby's government was defeated by 13 votes on an amendment to the Address from the Throne. He resigned, and the Queen reluctantly sent for Palmerston again.

=== Opposition and third term as Chancellor ===
After Derby's second ejection from office, Disraeli faced dissension from Conservatives who blamed him for the defeat. Others felt he was disloyal to Derby, who warned Disraeli of MPs seeking his removal from the front bench. Among the conspirators were Lord Robert Cecil, a Conservative MP who would a quarter century later become prime minister as Lord Salisbury; he wrote that having Disraeli as leader in the Commons made it less likely the party would regain office. When Cecil's father objected, Lord Robert stated, "I have merely put into print what all the country gentlemen were saying in private."

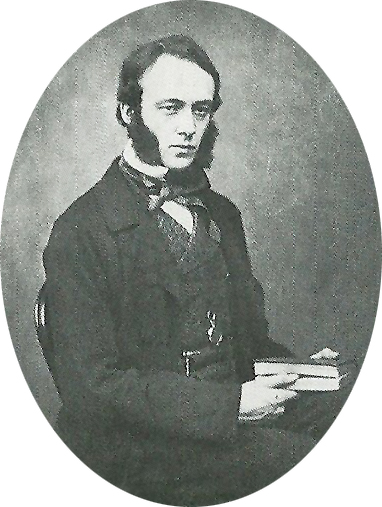
Lord Robert Cecil, Disraeli's fierce opponent in the 1860s, but later his ally and successor

Disraeli led a toothless opposition in the Commons—seeing no way of unseating Palmerston, Derby privately agreed not to seek the government's defeat. Disraeli kept himself informed on foreign affairs, and on what was going on in cabinet, thanks to a source within it. When the American Civil War began in 1861, Disraeli said little publicly, but like most Englishmen expected the South to win. Less reticent were Palmerston, Gladstone, and Russell, whose statements in support of the South contributed to years of hard feelings in the United States. In 1862, Disraeli met Prussian Count Otto von Bismarck and said of him, "be careful about that man, he means what he says".

The party truce ended in 1864, with Tories outraged over Palmerston's handling of the territorial dispute between the German Confederation and Denmark known as the Schleswig-Holstein Question. Disraeli had little help from Derby, who was ill, but he united the party enough on a no-confidence vote to limit the government to a majority of 18—Tory defections and absentees kept Palmerston in office. Despite rumours about Palmerston's health as he turned 80, he remained personally popular, and the Liberals increased their margin in the July 1865 general election. Derby predicted to Disraeli that neither of them would ever hold office again.

Political plans were thrown into disarray by Palmerston's death on 18 October 1865. Russell became prime minister again, with Gladstone clearly the Liberal Party's leader-in-waiting, and as Leader of the House Disraeli's direct opponent. One of Russell's early priorities was a Reform Bill, but the proposed legislation that Gladstone announced on 12 March 1866 divided his party. The Conservatives and the dissident Liberals repeatedly attacked Gladstone's bill, and in June finally defeated the government; Russell resigned on 26 June. Derby formed a third Conservative government, with Disraeli again as chancellor. It was again a minority government, with the dissidents in the Commons still refusing to serve under Disraeli..

=== Tory Democrat: the 1867 Reform Act ===
It was Disraeli's belief that if given the vote British people would use it instinctively to put their natural and traditional rulers, the gentlemen of the Conservative Party, into power. Responding to renewed agitation for popular suffrage, Disraeli persuaded a majority of the cabinet to agree to a Reform bill. With what Derby cautioned was "a leap in the dark", Disraeli had outflanked the Liberals who, as the supposed champions of Reform, dared not oppose him. In the absence of a credible party rival and for fear of having an election called on the issue, Conservatives felt obliged to support Disraeli despite their misgivings.

There were Tory dissenters, most notably Lord Cranborne (as Robert Cecil was by then known) who resigned from the government and spoke against the bill, accusing Disraeli of "a political betrayal which has no parallel in our Parliamentary annals". Even as Disraeli accepted Liberal amendments (although pointedly refusing those moved by Gladstone) that further lowered the property qualification, Cranborne was unable to lead an effective rebellion. Disraeli gained wide acclaim and became a hero to his party for the "marvellous parliamentary skill" with which he secured the passage of Reform in the Commons.

From the Liberal benches too there was admiration. MP for Nottingham Bernal Ostborne declared:

I have always thought the Chancellor of Exchequer was the greatest Radical in the House. He has achieved what no other man in the country could have done. He has lugged up that great omnibus full of stupid, heavy, country gentlemen--I only say 'stupid' in the parliamentary sense--and has converted these Conservative into Radical Reformers.

The Reform Act 1867 passed that August. It extended the franchise by 938,427 men—an increase of 88%—by giving the vote to male householders and male lodgers paying at least £10 for rooms. It eliminated rotten boroughs with fewer than 10,000 inhabitants, and granted constituencies to 15 unrepresented towns, with extra representation to large municipalities such as Liverpool and Manchester.

== Prime Minister (1868) ==
=== First term ===
Derby had long had attacks of gout which left him bedbound, unable to deal with politics. As the new session of Parliament approached in February 1868, he was unable to leave his home but was reluctant to resign, as at 68 he was much younger than either Palmerston or Russell at the end of their premierships. Derby knew that his "attacks of illness would, at no distant period, incapacitate me from the discharge of my public duties"; doctors had warned him that his health required his resignation. In late February, with Parliament in session and Derby absent, he wrote to Disraeli asking for confirmation that "you will not shrink from the additional heavy responsibility". Reassured, he wrote to the Queen, resigning and recommending Disraeli as "only he could command the cordial support, en masse, of his present colleagues". Disraeli went to Osborne House on the Isle of Wight, where the Queen asked him to form a government. The monarch wrote to her daughter, Prussian Crown Princess Victoria, "Mr. Disraeli is Prime Minister! A proud thing for a man 'risen from the people' to have obtained!" The new prime minister told those who came to congratulate him, "I have climbed to the top of the greasy pole."

=== First government, February–December 1868 ===
Clockwise from top left: Chelmsford, Cairns, Hunt and Manning

The Conservatives remained a minority in the House of Commons and the passage of the Reform Bill required the calling of a new election once the new voting register had been compiled. Disraeli's term as prime minister, which began in February 1868, would therefore be short unless the Conservatives won the general election. He made only two major changes in the cabinet: he replaced Lord Chelmsford as Lord Chancellor with Lord Cairns and brought in George Ward Hunt as Chancellor of the Exchequer. Derby had intended to replace Chelmsford once a vacancy in a suitable sinecure developed. Disraeli was unwilling to wait, and Cairns, in his view, was a far stronger minister.

Disraeli's first premiership was dominated by the heated debate over the Church of Ireland. Although Ireland was largely Roman Catholic, the Church of Ireland represented most landowners. It remained the established church and was funded by direct taxation, which was greatly resented by the Catholics and Presbyterians. An initial attempt by Disraeli to negotiate with Archbishop Manning the establishment of a Catholic university in Dublin foundered in March when Gladstone moved resolutions to disestablish the Irish Church altogether. The proposal united the Liberals under Gladstone's leadership, while causing divisions among the Conservatives.

The Conservatives remained in office because the new electoral register was not yet ready; neither party wished a poll under the old roll. Gladstone began using the Liberal majority in the Commons to push through resolutions and legislation. Disraeli's government survived until the December general election, at which the Liberals were returned to power with a majority.

In its short life, the first Disraeli government passed noncontroversial laws. It ended public executions, and the Corrupt Practices Act did much to end electoral bribery. It authorised an early version of nationalisation, having the Post Office buy up the telegraph companies. Amendments to the school law, the Scottish legal system, and the railway laws were passed. In addition, the Public Health (Scotland) Act instituted sanitary inspectors and medical officers. According to one study, "better sanitation was enforced throughout Scotland." Disraeli sent the successful expedition against Tewodros II of Ethiopia under Sir Robert Napier.

=== Opposition leader; 1874 election ===
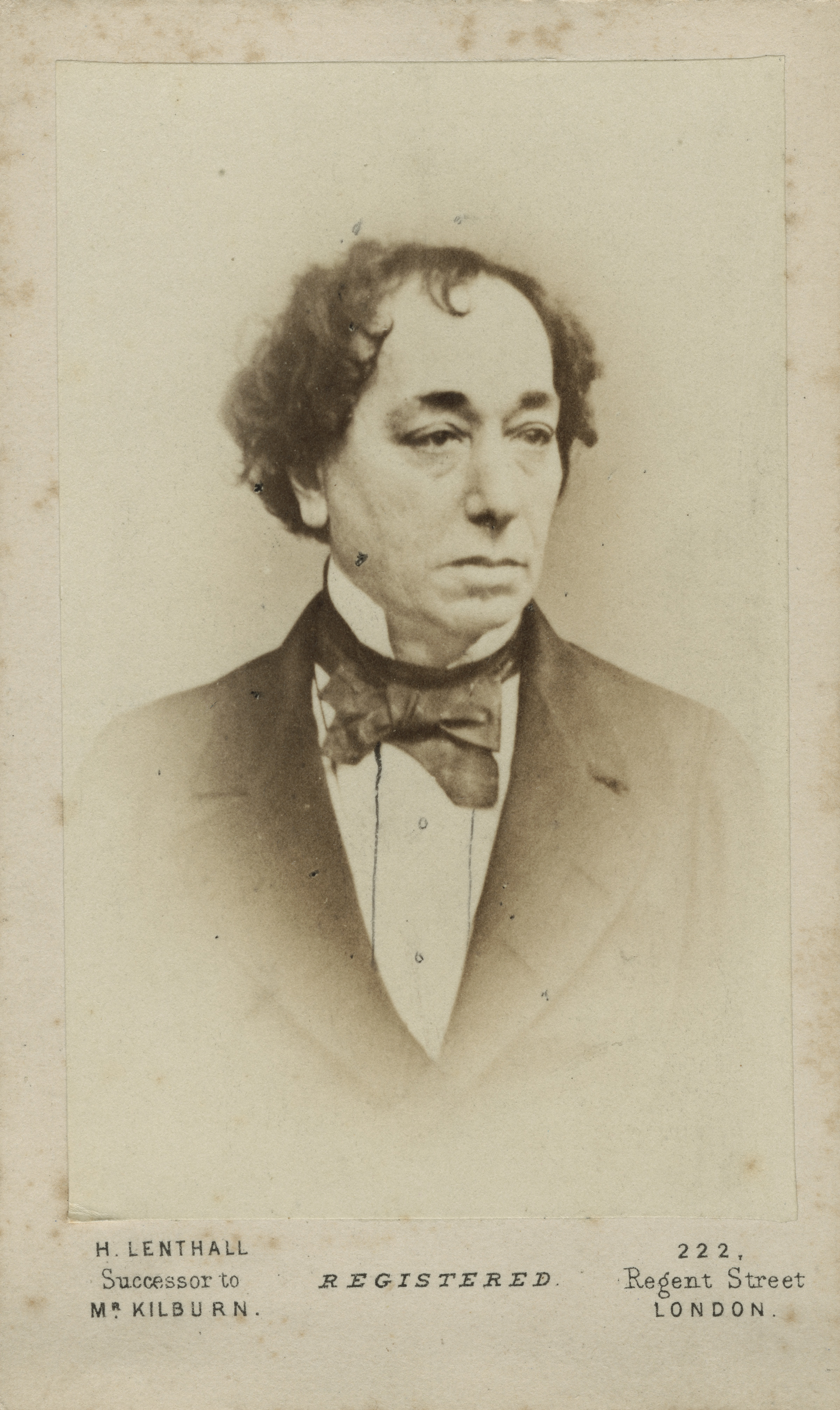
Disraeli c. 1870

Given Gladstone's majority in the Commons, Disraeli could do little but protest and await Liberal mistakes as the government advanced legislation. He used this leisure time to write a new novel, Lothair (1870). A work of fiction by a former prime minister was a novelty for Britain, and the book became a bestseller.

By 1872 there was dissent in the Conservative ranks over the failure to challenge Gladstone. This was quieted as Disraeli took steps to assert his leadership, and as divisions among the Liberals became clear. Public support for Disraeli was shown by cheering at a thanksgiving service in 1872 on the recovery of the Prince of Wales from illness, while Gladstone was met with silence. Disraeli had supported the efforts of party manager John Eldon Gorst to put the administration of the Conservative Party on a modern basis. On Gorst's advice, Disraeli gave a speech to a mass meeting in Manchester that year. To roaring approval, he compared the Liberal front bench to "a range of exhausted volcanoes... But the situation is still dangerous. There are occasional earthquakes and ever and again the dark rumbling of the sea." Gladstone, Disraeli stated, dominated the scene and "alternated between a menace and a sigh".

At his first departure from 10 Downing Street in 1868, Disraeli had Victoria make his wife Mary Anne Viscountess Beaconsfield in her own right in lieu of a peerage for himself. Through 1872 the eighty-year-old peeress had stomach cancer. She died on 15 December. Urged by a clergyman to turn her thoughts to Jesus Christ in her final days, she said she could not: "You know Dizzy is my J.C."

In 1873, Gladstone brought forward legislation to establish a Catholic university in Dublin. This divided the Liberals, and on 12 March an alliance of Conservatives and Irish Catholics defeated the government by three votes. Gladstone resigned, and the Queen sent for Disraeli, who refused to take office. Without a general election, a Conservative government would be another minority; Disraeli wanted the power a majority would bring and felt he could gain it later by leaving the Liberals in office now. Gladstone's government struggled on, beset by scandal and unimproved by a reshuffle. As part of that change, Gladstone took on the office of Chancellor, (Note: Gladstone caused great surprise by this move; he transferred the incumbent Chancellor, Robert Lowe, to the Home Office. Lord Ripon left the cabinet, making way as Lord President of the Council for Henry Bruce, moved from the Home Office.) leading to questions as to whether he had to stand for re-election on taking on a second ministry—until the 1920s, MPs becoming ministers had to seek re-election.

In January 1874, Gladstone called a general election, convinced that if he waited longer, he would do worse at the polls. Balloting was spread over two weeks, beginning on 1 February. As the constituencies voted, it became clear that the result would be a Conservative majority, the first since 1841. In Scotland, where the Conservatives were perennially weak, they increased from seven seats to nineteen. Overall, they won 350 seats to 245 for the Liberals and 57 for the Irish Home Rule League. Disraeli became prime minister for the second time.

== Prime Minister (1874–1880) ==
=== Second term ===
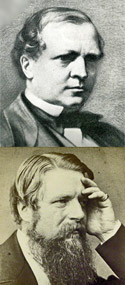
Derby (top) and Northcote

Disraeli's cabinet of twelve, with six peers and six commoners, was the smallest since Reform. Of the peers, five of them had been in Disraeli's 1868 cabinet; the sixth, Lord Salisbury, was reconciled to Disraeli after negotiation and became Secretary of State for India. Lord Stanley (who had succeeded his father, the former prime minister, as Earl of Derby) became Foreign Secretary and Sir Stafford Northcote the Chancellor.

In August 1876, Disraeli was elevated to the House of Lords as Earl of Beaconsfield and Viscount Hughenden. The Queen had offered to ennoble him as early as 1868; he had then declined. She did so again in 1874, when he fell ill at Balmoral, but he was reluctant to leave the Commons for a house in which he had no experience. Continued ill health during his second premiership caused him to contemplate resignation, but his lieutenant, Derby, was unwilling, feeling that he could not manage the Queen. For Disraeli, the Lords, where the debate was less intense, was the alternative to resignation. Five days before the end of the 1876 session of Parliament, on 11 August, Disraeli was seen to linger and look around the chamber before departing. Newspapers reported his ennoblement the following morning.

In addition to the viscounty bestowed on Mary Anne Disraeli, the earldom of Beaconsfield was to have been bestowed on Edmund Burke in 1797, but he had died before receiving it. The name Beaconsfield, a town near Hughenden, was given to a minor character in Vivian Grey. Disraeli made various statements about his elevation, writing to Selina, Lady Bradford on 8 August 1876, "I am quite tired of that place [the Commons]" but when asked by a friend how he liked the Lords, replied, "I am dead; dead but in the Elysian fields."

=== Domestic policy ===
==== Legislation ====
Under the stewardship of Richard Assheton Cross, the Home Secretary, Disraeli's new government enacted many reforms, including the Artisans' and Labourers' Dwellings Improvement Act 1875 (38 & 39 Vict. c. 36), which made inexpensive loans available to towns and cities to construct working-class housing. Also enacted were the Public Health Act 1875 (38 & 39 Vict. c. 55), modernising sanitary codes, the Sale of Food and Drugs Act 1875 (38 & 39 Vict. c. 63), and the Elementary Education Act 1876 (39 & 40 Vict. c. 70). Disraeli's government introduced a new Factory Act meant to protect workers, the Conspiracy, and Protection of Property Act 1875 (38 & 39 Vict. c. 86), which allowed peaceful picketing, and the Employers and Workmen Act 1875 (38 & 39 Vict. c. 90) to enable workers to sue employers in the civil courts if they broke legal contracts.

The Sale of Food and Drugs Act 1875 prohibited the mixing of injurious ingredients with articles of food or with drugs, and provision was made for the appointment of analysts; all tea "had to be examined by a customs official on importation, and when in the opinion of the analyst it was unfit for food, the tea had to be destroyed". The Employers and Workmen Act 1875, according to one study, "finally placed employers and employed on an equal footing before the law". The Conspiracy, and Protection of Property Act 1875 established the right to strike by providing that "an agreement or combination by one or more persons to do, or procure to be done, any act in contemplation or furtherance of a trade dispute between employers and workmen, shall not be indictable as a conspiracy if such act committed by one person would not be punishable as a crime".

As a result of these social reforms the Liberal-Labour MP Alexander Macdonald told his constituents in 1879, "The Conservative party have done more for the working classes in five years than the Liberals have in fifty."

==== Civil Service ====
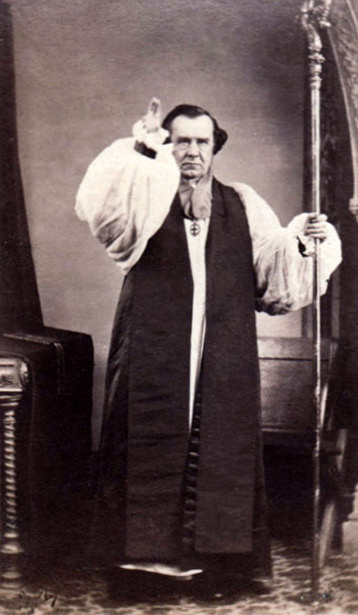
Disraeli's failure to appoint Samuel Wilberforce as Bishop of London may have cost him votes in the 1868 election.

Gladstone in 1870 had sponsored an Order in Council, introducing competitive examination into the Civil Service, diminishing the political aspects of government hiring. Disraeli did not agree, and while he did not seek to reverse the order, his actions often frustrated its intent. For example, Disraeli made political appointments to positions previously given to career civil servants. He was backed by his party, hungry for office and its emoluments after almost thirty years with only brief spells in government. Disraeli gave positions to hard-up Conservative leaders, even—to Gladstone's outrage—creating one office at £2,000 per year. Nevertheless, Disraeli made fewer peers (only 22, including one of Victoria's sons) than had Gladstone (37 during his just over five years in office).

As he had in government posts, Disraeli rewarded old friends with clerical positions, making Sydney Turner, son of a good friend of Isaac D'Israeli, Dean of Ripon. He favoured Low church clergymen in promotion, disliking other movements in Anglicanism for political reasons. In this, he came into disagreement with the Queen, who, out of loyalty to her late husband Prince Albert, preferred Broad church teachings. One controversial appointment had occurred shortly before the 1868 election. When the position of Archbishop of Canterbury fell vacant, Disraeli reluctantly agreed to the Queen's preferred candidate, Archibald Tait, the Bishop of London. To fill Tait's vacant see, Disraeli was urged by many people to appoint Samuel Wilberforce, the former Bishop of Winchester. Disraeli disliked Wilberforce and instead appointed John Jackson, the Bishop of Lincoln. Blake suggested that, on balance, these appointments cost Disraeli more votes than they gained him.

=== Foreign policy ===
Disraeli always considered foreign affairs to be the most critical and interesting part of statesmanship. Nevertheless, his biographer Robert Blake doubts that his subject had specific ideas about foreign policy when he took office in 1874. He had rarely travelled abroad; since his youthful tour of the Middle East in 1830–1831, he had left Britain only for his honeymoon and three visits to Paris, the last of which was in 1856. As he had criticised Gladstone for a do-nothing foreign policy, he most probably contemplated what actions would reassert Britain's place in Europe. His brief first premiership, and the first year of his second, gave him little opportunity to make his mark in foreign affairs.

==== Suez ====
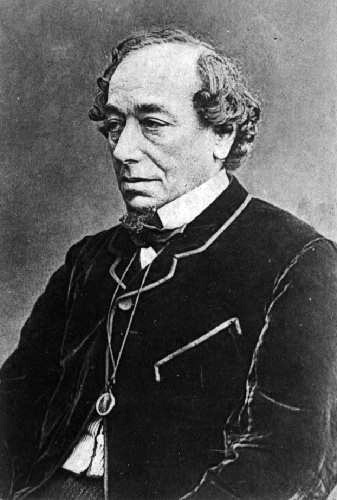
Portrait of Disraeli published in 1873

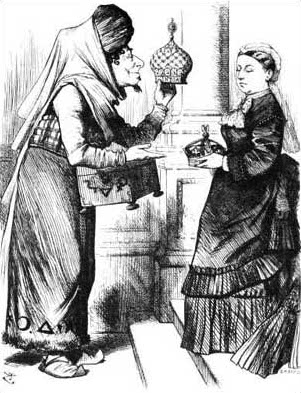
New Crowns for Old depicts Disraeli as Abanazar from the pantomime Aladdin, offering Victoria an imperial crown in exchange for a royal one. Disraeli cultivated a public image of himself as an Imperialist with grand gestures such as conferring on Queen Victoria the title "Empress of India".

The Suez Canal, opened in 1869, cut weeks and thousands of miles off the sea journey between Britain and India; in 1875, approximately 80% of the ships using the canal were British. In the event of another rebellion in India or a Russian invasion, the time saved at Suez might be crucial. Built by French interests, 56% of the stocks in the canal remained in their hands, while 44% of the stock belonged to Isma'il Pasha, the Khedive of Egypt. He was notorious for his profligate spending. The canal was losing money, and an attempt by Ferdinand de Lesseps, builder of the canal, to raise the tolls had fallen through when the Khedive had threatened military force to prevent it, and had also attracted Disraeli's attention. The Khedive governed Egypt under the Ottoman Empire; as in the Crimea, the issue of the Canal raised the Eastern Question of what to do about the decaying empire governed from Constantinople. With much of the pre-canal trade and communications between Britain and India passing through the Ottoman Empire, Britain had done its best to prop up the Ottomans against the threat that Russia would take Constantinople, cutting those communications, and giving Russian ships unfettered access to the Mediterranean. The French might also threaten those lines. Britain had had the opportunity to purchase shares in the canal but had declined to do so.

Disraeli sent the Liberal MP Nathan Rothschild to Paris to enquire about buying de Lesseps's shares. On 14 November 1875, the editor of the Pall Mall Gazette, Frederick Greenwood, learned from London banker Henry Oppenheim that the Khedive was seeking to sell his shares in the Suez Canal Company to a French firm. Greenwood quickly told Lord Derby, the Foreign Secretary, who notified Disraeli. The Prime Minister moved immediately to secure the shares. On 23 November, the Khedive offered to sell the shares for 100,000,000 francs. Rather than seek the aid of the Bank of England, Disraeli borrowed funds from Lionel de Rothschild, who took a commission on the deal. The banker's capital was at risk as Parliament could have refused to ratify the transaction. The contract for purchase was signed at Cairo on 25 November and the shares deposited at the British consulate the following day.

Disraeli told the Queen, "it is settled; you have it, madam!" The public saw the venture as a daring statement of British dominance of the seas. Sir Ian Malcolm described the Suez Canal share purchase as "the greatest romance of Mr. Disraeli's romantic career". In the following decades, the security of the Suez Canal became a major concern of British foreign policy. Under Gladstone, Britain took control of Egypt in 1882. A later Foreign Secretary, Lord Curzon, described the canal in 1909 as "the determining influence of every considerable movement of British power to the east and south of the Mediterranean".

==== Royal Titles Act ====
Although initially curious about Disraeli when he entered Parliament in 1837, Victoria came to detest him over his treatment of Peel. Over time, her dislike softened, especially as Disraeli took pains to cultivate her. He told Matthew Arnold, "Everybody likes flattery; and, when you come to royalty, you should lay it on with a trowel". Disraeli's biographer, Adam Kirsch, suggests that Disraeli's obsequious treatment of his queen was part flattery, part belief that this was how a queen should be addressed by a loyal subject, and part awe that a middle-class man of Jewish birth should be the companion of a monarch. By the time of his second premiership, Disraeli had built a strong relationship with Victoria, probably closer to her than any of her prime ministers except her first, Lord Melbourne. When Disraeli returned as prime minister in 1874 and went to kiss hands, he did so literally, on one knee; according to Richard Aldous in his book on the rivalry between Disraeli and Gladstone, "Victoria and Disraeli would exploit their closeness for mutual advantage."

Victoria had long wished to have an imperial title, reflecting Britain's expanding domain. She was irked when Tsar Alexander II held a higher rank than her as an emperor, and was appalled that her daughter, the Prussian Crown Princess, would outrank her when her husband came to the throne. She also saw an imperial title as proclaiming Britain's increased stature in the world. The title "Empress of India" had been used informally for some time and she wished to have that title formally bestowed on her. The Queen prevailed upon Disraeli to introduce a Royal Titles Bill, and also told of her intent to open Parliament in person, which during this time she did only when she wanted something from legislators. Disraeli was cautious in response, as careful soundings of MPs brought a negative reaction, and he declined to place such a proposal in the Queen's Speech.

Once the desired bill was finally prepared, Disraeli's handling of it was not adept. He neglected to notify either the Prince of Wales or the Opposition and was met by irritation from the prince and a full-scale attack from the Liberals. An old enemy of Disraeli, former Liberal Chancellor Robert Lowe, alleged during the debate in the Commons that two previous prime ministers had refused to introduce such legislation for the Queen. Gladstone immediately stated that he was not one of them, and the Queen gave Disraeli leave to quote her saying she had never approached a prime minister with such a proposal. According to Blake, Disraeli "in a brilliant oration of withering invective proceeded to destroy Lowe", who apologised and never held office again. Disraeli said of Lowe that he was the only person in London with whom he would not shake hands: "he is in the mud and there I leave him."

Fearful of losing, Disraeli was reluctant to bring the bill to a vote in the Commons, but when he did it passed with a majority of 75. Once the bill was formally enacted, Victoria began signing her letters "Victoria R & I" (Latin: Regina et Imperatrix, Queen and Empress). According to Aldous, the bill "shattered Disraeli's authority in the House of Commons".

==== Balkans and Bulgaria ====
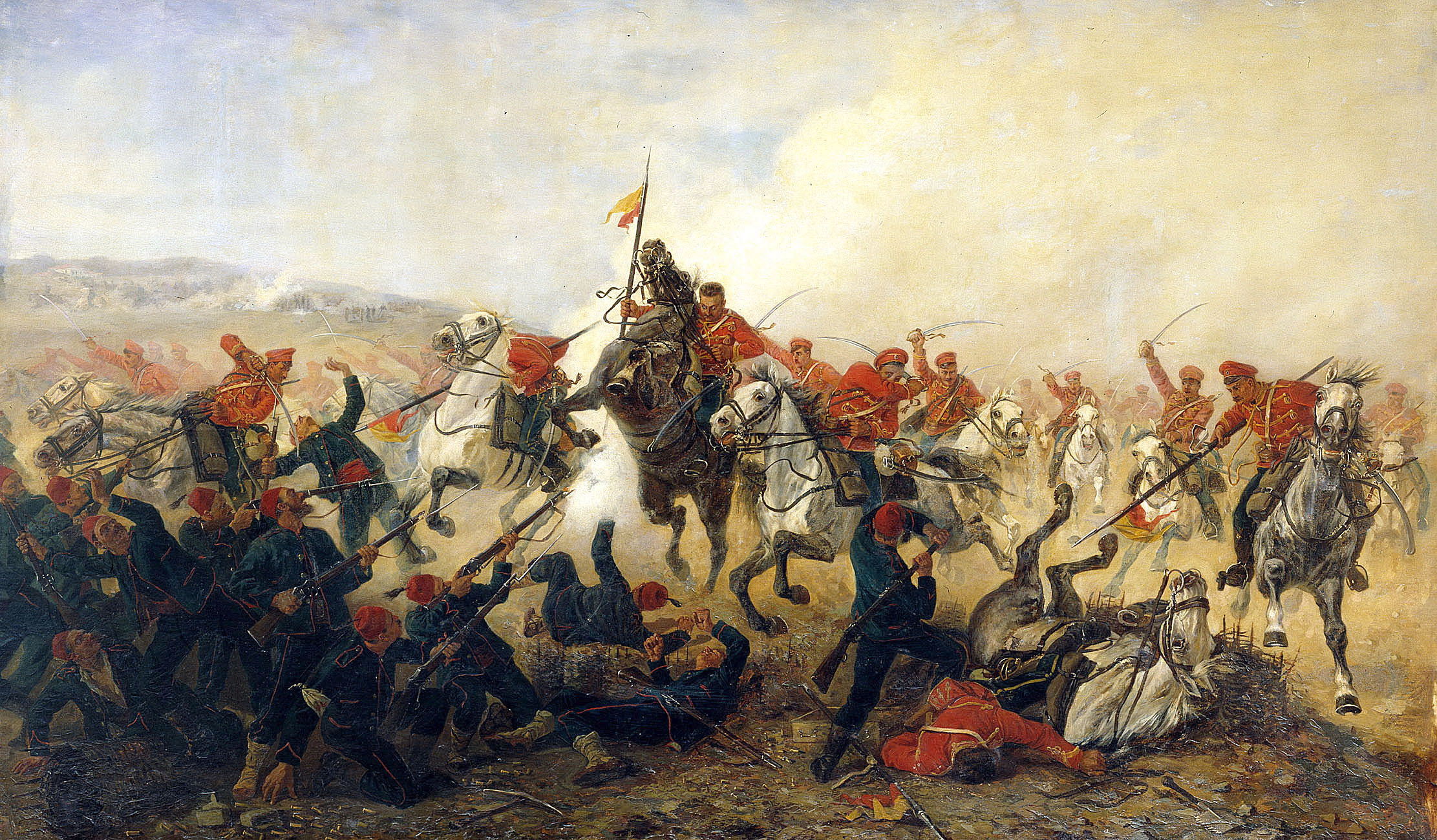
Fight in Bulgaria during the Russo-Turkish War of 1877–78

In July 1875 Serb populations in Bosnia and Herzegovina, then provinces of the Ottoman Empire, revolted against the Turks, alleging religious persecution and poor administration. The following January, Sultan Abdülaziz agreed to reforms proposed by Hungarian statesman Julius Andrássy, but the rebels, suspecting they might win their freedom, continued their uprising, joined by militants in Serbia and Bulgaria. The Turks suppressed the Bulgarian uprising harshly, and when reports of these actions escaped, Disraeli and Derby stated in Parliament that they did not believe them. Disraeli called them "coffee-house babble" and dismissed allegations of torture by the Ottomans since "Oriental people usually terminate their connections with culprits in a more expeditious fashion".

Gladstone, who had left the Liberal leadership and retired from public life, was appalled by reports of atrocities in Bulgaria, and in August 1876, penned a hastily written pamphlet arguing that the Turks should be deprived of Bulgaria because of what they had done there. He sent a copy to Disraeli, who called it "vindictive and ill-written ... of all the Bulgarian horrors perhaps the greatest". Gladstone's pamphlet became an immense best-seller and rallied the Liberals to urge that the Ottoman Empire should no longer be a British ally. Disraeli wrote to Lord Salisbury on 3 September, "Had it not been for these unhappy 'atrocities', we should have settled a peace very honourable to England and satisfactory to Europe. Now we are obliged to work from a new point of departure, and dictate to Turkey, who has forfeited all sympathy." In spite of this, Disraeli's policy favoured Constantinople and Ottoman territorial integrity.

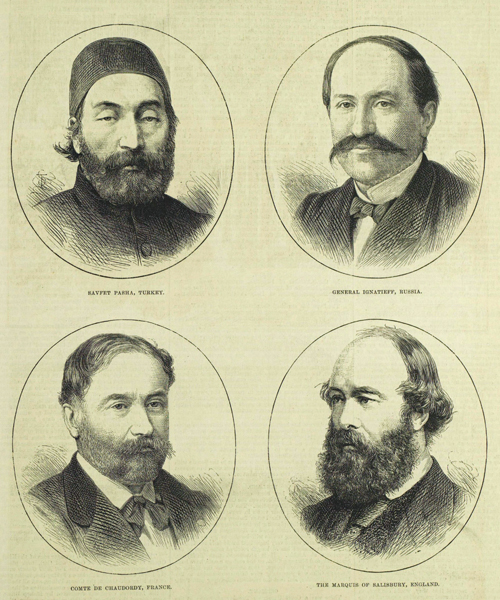
International delegates at the Constantinople Conference: clockwise from top left, Saffet Pasha (Turkey), General Ignatieff (Russia), Lord Salisbury (Britain) and the Comte de Chaudordy (France)

Disraeli and the cabinet sent Salisbury as lead British representative to the Constantinople Conference, which met in December 1876 and January 1877. In advance of the conference, Disraeli sent Salisbury private word to seek British military occupation of Bulgaria and Bosnia, and British control of the Ottoman Army. Salisbury ignored these instructions, which his biographer, Andrew Roberts deemed "ludicrous". The conference failed to reach agreement with the Turks.

Parliament opened in February 1877, with Disraeli now in the Lords as Earl of Beaconsfield. He spoke only once there in the 1877 session on the Eastern Question, stating on 20 February that there was a need for stability in the Balkans, and that forcing Turkey into territorial concessions would not secure it. The Prime Minister wanted a deal with the Ottomans whereby Britain would temporarily occupy strategic areas to deter the Russians from war, to be returned on the signing of a peace treaty, but found little support in his cabinet, which favoured partition of the Ottoman Empire. As Disraeli, by then in poor health, continued to battle within the cabinet, Russia invaded Turkey on 21 April, beginning the Russo-Turkish War.

==== Congress of Berlin ====
The Russians pushed through Ottoman territory and by December 1877 had captured the strategic Bulgarian town of Plevna. The war divided the British, but the Russian success caused some to forget the atrocities and call for intervention on the Turkish side. Others hoped for further Russian successes. The fall of Plevna was a major story for weeks, and Disraeli's warnings that Russia was a threat to British interests in the eastern Mediterranean were deemed prophetic. The jingoistic attitude of many Britons increased Disraeli's political support, and the Queen showed her favour by visiting him at Hughenden—the first time she had visited the country home of her prime minister since the Melbourne ministry. At the end of January 1878, the Ottoman Sultan appealed to Britain to save Constantinople. Amid war fever in Britain, the government asked Parliament to vote £6,000,000 to prepare the Army and Navy for war. Gladstone opposed the measure, but less than half his party voted with him. Popular opinion was with Disraeli, though some thought him too soft for not immediately declaring war on Russia.

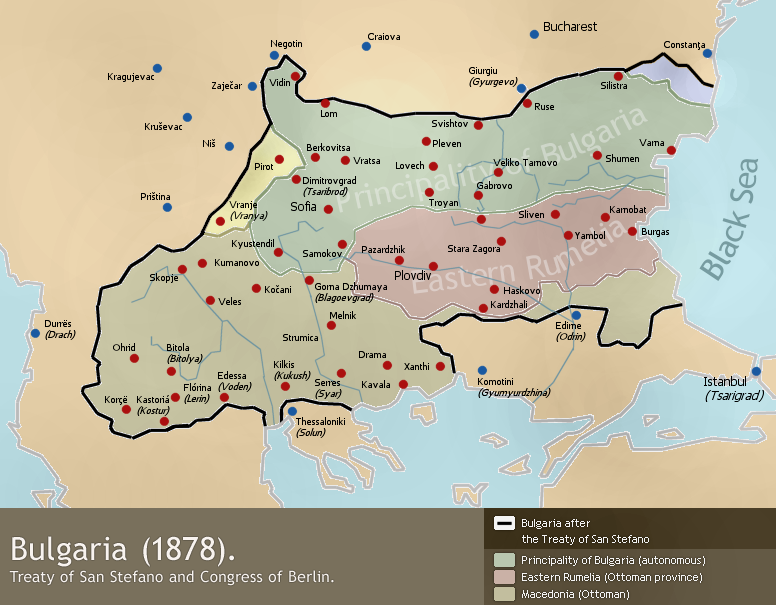
Bulgaria as constituted under the San Stefano treaty and as divided at Berlin

With the Russians close to Constantinople, the Turks yielded and in March 1878, signed the Treaty of San Stefano, conceding a Bulgarian state covering a large part of the Balkans. It would be initially Russian-occupied and many feared that it would give them a client state close to Constantinople. Other Ottoman possessions in Europe would become independent; additional territory was to be ceded directly to Russia. This was unacceptable to the British, who protested, hoping to get the Russians to agree to attend an international conference which German chancellor Bismarck proposed to hold at Berlin. The cabinet discussed Disraeli's proposal to position Indian troops at Malta for possible transit to the Balkans and call out reserves. Derby resigned in protest, and Disraeli appointed Salisbury as Foreign Secretary. Amid British preparations for war, the Russians and Turks agreed to discussions at Berlin.

In advance of the meeting, confidential negotiations took place between Britain and Russia in April and May 1878. The Russians were willing to make changes to the big Bulgaria, but were determined to retain their new possessions, Bessarabia in Europe and Batum and Kars on the east coast of the Black Sea. To counterbalance this, Britain required a possession in the Eastern Mediterranean where it might base ships and troops and negotiated with the Ottomans for the cession of Cyprus. Once this was secretly agreed, Disraeli was prepared to allow Russia's territorial gains.

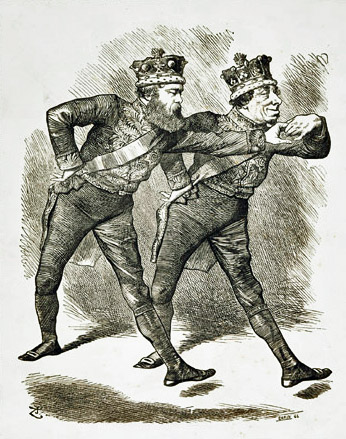
Disraeli (right) and Salisbury as Knights of the Garter, portrayed by John Tenniel in The Pas de deux (From the Scène de Triomphe in the Grand Anglo-Turkish Ballet d'Action)

The Congress of Berlin was held in June and July 1878, the central relationship in it that between Disraeli and Bismarck. In later years, the German chancellor would show visitors to his office three pictures on the wall: "the portrait of my Sovereign, there on the right that of my wife, and on the left, there, that of Lord Beaconsfield". Disraeli caused an uproar in the congress by making his opening address in English, rather than in French, hitherto accepted as the international language of diplomacy. By one account, the British ambassador in Berlin, Lord Odo Russell, hoping to spare the delegates Disraeli's very poor French accent, told Disraeli that the congress was hoping to hear a speech in English by one of its masters.

Disraeli left much of the detailed work to Salisbury, concentrating his efforts on making it as difficult as possible for the broken-up big Bulgaria to reunite. Disraeli intended that Batum be demilitarised, but the Russians obtained their preferred language, and in 1886, fortified the town. Nevertheless, the Cyprus Convention ceding the island to Britain was announced during the congress, and again made Disraeli a sensation.

Disraeli gained agreement that Turkey should retain enough of its European possessions to safeguard the Dardanelles. By one account, when met with Russian intransigence, Disraeli told his secretary to order a special train to return them home to begin the war. Czar Alexander II later described the congress as "a European coalition against Russia, under Bismarck".

The Treaty of Berlin was signed on 13 July 1878 at the Radziwill Palace in Berlin. (Note: For the first time, the title of Britain's lead signatory was given as "Prime Minister": Disraeli signed as "First Lord of the Treasury and Prime Minister of her Britannic Majesty".) Disraeli and Salisbury returned home to heroes' receptions. At the door of 10 Downing Street, Disraeli received flowers sent by the Queen. There, he told the gathered crowd, "Lord Salisbury and I have brought you back peace—but a peace I hope with honour." (Note: Disraeli was probably trying to evoke the unfortunate words of Russell before the Crimean War, "If peace cannot be maintained with honour, it is no longer peace." Disraeli's words would be recalled by later Prime Minister Neville Chamberlain in 1938, saying that it was the second time a Prime Minister had returned from Germany bearing peace with honour, before declaring "peace for our time".) The Queen offered him a dukedom, which he declined, though accepting the Garter, as long as Salisbury also received it. In Berlin, word spread of Bismarck's admiring description of Disraeli, "Der alte Jude, das ist der Mann! " (Note: Variously translated, but literally "The old Jew, this is the man!") In the weeks after Berlin, Disraeli and the cabinet considered calling a general election to capitalise on the public applause he and Salisbury had received. Parliaments were then for a seven-year term, and it was the custom not to go to the country until the sixth year unless forced to by events. Only four and a half years had passed and they did not see any clouds on the horizon that might forecast Conservative defeat if they waited. This decision not to seek re-election has often been cited as a great mistake by Disraeli. Blake, however, pointed out that results in local elections had been moving against the Conservatives, and doubted if Disraeli missed any great opportunity by waiting.

==== Afghanistan to Zululand ====
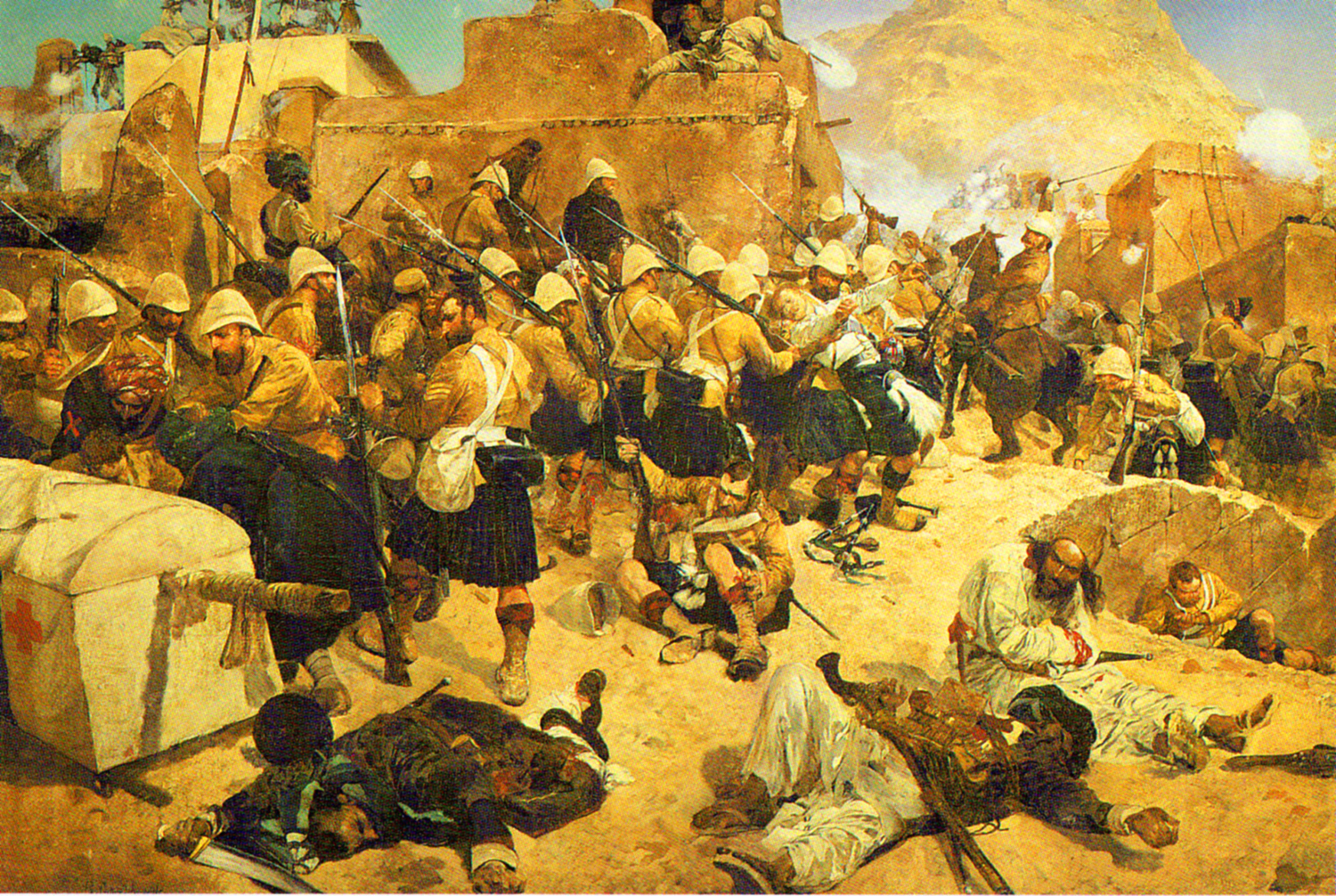
A depiction of the Battle of Kandahar, fought in 1880. Britain's victory in the Second Anglo-Afghan War proved a boost to Disraeli's government.

As successful invasions of India generally came through Afghanistan, the British had observed and sometimes intervened there since the 1830s, hoping to keep the Russians out. In 1878 the Russians sent a mission to Kabul; it was not rejected by the Afghans, as the British had hoped. The British proposed to send their own mission, insisting that the Russians be sent away. The Viceroy of India Lord Lytton concealed his plans to issue this ultimatum from Disraeli, and when the Prime Minister insisted he take no action, went ahead anyway. When the Afghans made no answer, Lord Cranbrook as Secretary of State for War, ordered the advance against them in the Second Anglo-Afghan War. Under Lord Roberts, the British easily defeated them and installed a new ruler, leaving a mission and garrison in Kabul.

British policy in South Africa was to encourage federation between the British-run Cape Colony and Natal, and the Boer republics, the Transvaal (annexed by Britain in 1877) and the Orange Free State. The governor of Cape Colony, Sir Bartle Frere, believing that the federation could not be accomplished until the native tribes acknowledged British rule, made demands on the Zulu and their king, Cetewayo, which they were certain to reject. As Zulu troops could not marry until they had washed their spears in blood, they were eager for combat. Frere did not send word to the cabinet of what he had done until the ultimatum was about to expire. Disraeli and the cabinet reluctantly backed him, and in early January 1879 resolved to send reinforcements. Before they could arrive, on 22 January, a Zulu impi (army), moving with great speed and endurance, destroyed a British encampment in South Africa in the Battle of Isandlwana. Over a thousand British and colonial troops were killed. Word of the defeat did not reach London until 12 February. Disraeli wrote the next day, "the terrible disaster has shaken me to the centre". He reprimanded Frere, but left him in charge, attracting fire from all sides. Disraeli sent General Sir Garnet Wolseley as High Commissioner and Commander in Chief, and Cetewayo and the Zulus were crushed at the Battle of Ulundi on 4 July 1879.

On 8 September 1879 Sir Louis Cavagnari, in charge of the mission in Kabul, was killed with his entire staff by rebelling Afghan soldiers. Roberts undertook a successful punitive expedition against the Afghans over the next six weeks.

=== 1880 election ===
In December 1878, Gladstone was offered the Liberal nomination for Edinburghshire, a constituency popularly known as Midlothian. The small Scottish electorate was dominated by two noblemen, the Conservative Duke of Buccleuch and the Liberal Earl of Rosebery. The Earl, a friend of both Disraeli and Gladstone who would succeed the latter after his final term as prime minister, had journeyed to the United States to view politics there, and was convinced that aspects of American electioneering techniques could be translated to Britain. On his advice, Gladstone accepted the offer in January 1879, and later that year began his Midlothian campaign, speaking not only in Edinburgh, but across Britain, attacking Disraeli, to huge crowds.

Conservative chances of re-election were damaged by the poor weather, and consequent effects on agriculture. Four consecutive wet summers through 1879 had led to poor harvests. In the past, the farmer had the consolation of higher prices at such times, but with bumper crops cheaply transported from the United States, grain prices remained low. Other European nations, faced with similar circumstances, opted for protection, and Disraeli was urged to reinstitute the Corn Laws. He declined, stating that he regarded the matter as settled. Protection would have been highly unpopular among the newly enfranchised urban working classes, as it would raise their cost of living. Amid an economic slump generally, the Conservatives lost support among farmers.

Disraeli's health continued to fail through 1879. Owing to his infirmities, Disraeli was 45 minutes late for the Lord Mayor's Dinner at the Guildhall in November, at which it is customary that the Prime Minister speaks. Though many commented on how healthy he looked, it took him great effort to appear so, and when he told the audience he expected to speak to the dinner again the following year, attendees chuckled. Gladstone was then in the midst of his campaign. Despite his public confidence, Disraeli recognised that the Conservatives would probably lose the next election and was already contemplating his Resignation Honours.

Despite this pessimism, Conservatives' hopes were buoyed in early 1880 with successes in by-elections the Liberals had expected to win, concluding with victory in Southwark, normally a Liberal stronghold. The cabinet had resolved to wait before dissolving Parliament; in early March they reconsidered, agreeing to go to the country as soon as possible. Parliament was dissolved on 24 March; the first borough constituencies began voting a week later.

Disraeli took no public part in the electioneering, it being deemed improper for peers to make speeches to influence Commons elections. This meant that the chief Conservatives—Disraeli, Salisbury, and India Secretary Lord Cranbrook—would not be heard from. The election was thought likely to be close. Once returns began to be announced, it became clear that the Conservatives were decisively beaten. The final result gave the Liberals an absolute majority of about 50. (Note: Party labels being less precise in the nineteenth century than latterly, accounts vary of the number of seats won. Of the 652 Commons seats, Blake gives the distribution as 353 (Liberals), 238 (Conservatives) and 61 (Home Rulers); Bradford gives the figures as 353, 237 and 62; Aldous gives 347, 240 and 65.)

== Final months, death, and memorials ==
Disraeli refused to cast blame for the defeat, which he understood was likely to be final for him. He wrote to Lady Bradford that it was just as much work to end a government as to form one, without any of the fun. Queen Victoria was bitter at his departure. Among the honours he arranged before resigning as prime minister on 21 April 1880 was one for his private secretary, Montagu Corry, who became Baron Rowton.

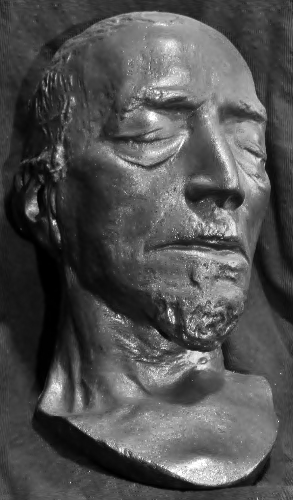
Disraeli's death mask

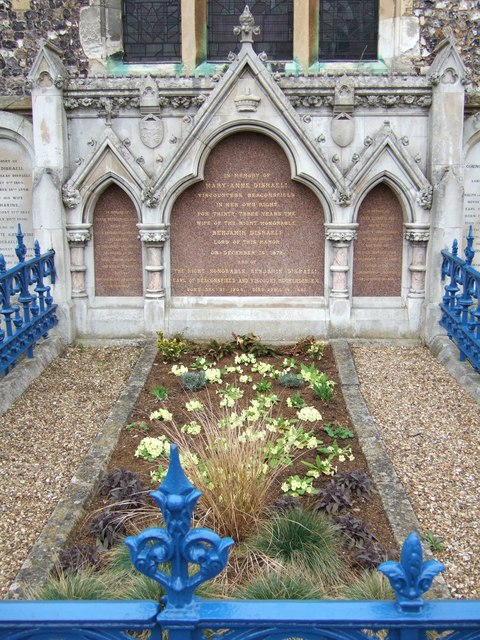
Disraeli's tomb at Hughenden

Returning to Hughenden, Disraeli brooded over his electoral dismissal, but also resumed work on Endymion, which he had begun in 1872 and laid aside before the 1874 election. The work was rapidly completed and published by November 1880. He carried on a correspondence with Victoria, with letters passed through intermediaries. When Parliament met in January 1881, he served as Conservative leader in the Lords, attempting to serve as a moderating influence on Gladstone's legislation.

Because of his asthma and gout, Disraeli went out as little as possible, fearing more serious episodes of illness. In March, he fell ill with bronchitis, and emerged from bed only for a meeting with Salisbury and other Conservative leaders on the 26th. As it became clear that this might be his final sickness, friends and opponents alike came to call. Disraeli declined a visit from the Queen, saying, "She would only ask me to take a message to Albert." Almost blind, when he received the last letter from Victoria of which he was aware on 5 April, he held it momentarily, then had it read to him by Lord Barrington, a Privy Councillor. One card, signed "A Workman", delighted its recipient: "Don't die yet, we can't do without you."

Despite the gravity of Disraeli's condition, the doctors concocted optimistic bulletins for public consumption. Prime Minister Gladstone called several times to enquire about his rival's condition, and wrote in his diary, "May the Almighty be near his pillow." There was intense public interest in Disraeli's struggles for life. Disraeli had customarily taken the sacrament at Easter; when this day was observed on 17 April, there was discussion among his friends and family if he should be given the opportunity, but those against, fearing that he would lose hope, prevailed. On the morning of the following day, Easter Monday, he became incoherent, then comatose. Disraeli's last confirmed words before dying at his home at 19 Curzon Street in the early morning of 19 April were "I had rather live but I am not afraid to die". (Note: According to Disraeli's biographer Stanley Weintraub, rumours about his last hours included that he may have summoned a Jesuit to receive him into the Catholic Church on his deathbed, or that Disraeli may have grasped his friend Sir Philip Rose's hand and mumbled, "There is—one God—of Israel!", which the biographer identifies as a version of the Shema, the Jewish declaration of faith in a unitary god. "More likely", Weintraub concludes, "Disraeli died as he had lived, a confirmed skeptic in the tradition of his father.") The anniversary of Disraeli's death was for some years commemorated in the United Kingdom as Primrose Day.

Despite having been offered a state funeral by Queen Victoria, Disraeli's executors decided against a public procession and funeral, fearing that too large crowds would gather to do him honour. The chief mourners at the service at Hughenden on 26 April were his brother Ralph and nephew Coningsby Disraeli, to whom Hughenden would eventually pass; Gathorne Gathorne-Hardy, Viscount Cranbrook, despite most of Disraeli's former cabinet being present, was notably absent in Italy. Queen Victoria was prostrated with grief, and considered ennobling Ralph or Coningsby as a memorial to Disraeli (without children, his titles became extinct with his death), but decided against it on the ground that their means were too small for a peerage. Protocol forbade her attending Disraeli's funeral (this would not be changed until 1965, when Queen Elizabeth II attended the rites for the former prime minister Sir Winston Churchill) but she sent primroses ("his favourite flowers") to the funeral and visited the burial vault to place a wreath four days later.

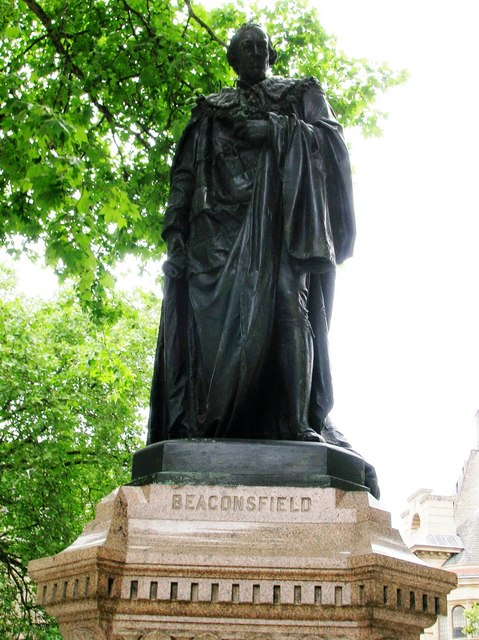
Statue of Disraeli in Parliament Square, London

Disraeli is buried with his wife in a vault beneath the Church of St Michael and All Angels which stands in the grounds of his home, Hughenden Manor. There is also a memorial to him in the chancel in the church, erected in his honour by Queen Victoria. His literary executor was his private secretary, Lord Rowton. The Disraeli vault also contains the body of Sarah Brydges Willyams, the wife of James Brydges Willyams of St Mawgan. Disraeli carried on a long correspondence with Mrs. Willyams, writing frankly about political affairs. At her death in 1863, she left him a large legacy, which helped clear his debts. His will was proved in April 1882 at £84,019 18 s. 7 d. (roughly equivalent to £8,832,685 in 2025).

Disraeli has a memorial in Westminster Abbey, erected by the nation on the motion of Gladstone in his memorial speech on Disraeli in the House of Commons. Gladstone had absented himself from the funeral, with his plea of the press of public business met with public mockery. His speech was widely anticipated, if only because his dislike for Disraeli was well known. In the event, the speech was a model of its kind, in which he avoided comment on Disraeli's politics while praising his personal qualities.

== Legacy ==
Disraeli's literary and political career interacted over his lifetime and fascinated Victorian Britain, making him "one of the most eminent figures in Victorian public life", and occasioned a large output of commentary. Critic Shane Leslie noted three decades after his death that "Disraeli's career was a romance such as no Eastern vizier or Western plutocrat could tell. He began as a pioneer in dress and an aesthete of words ... Disraeli actually made his novels come true."

=== Literary ===
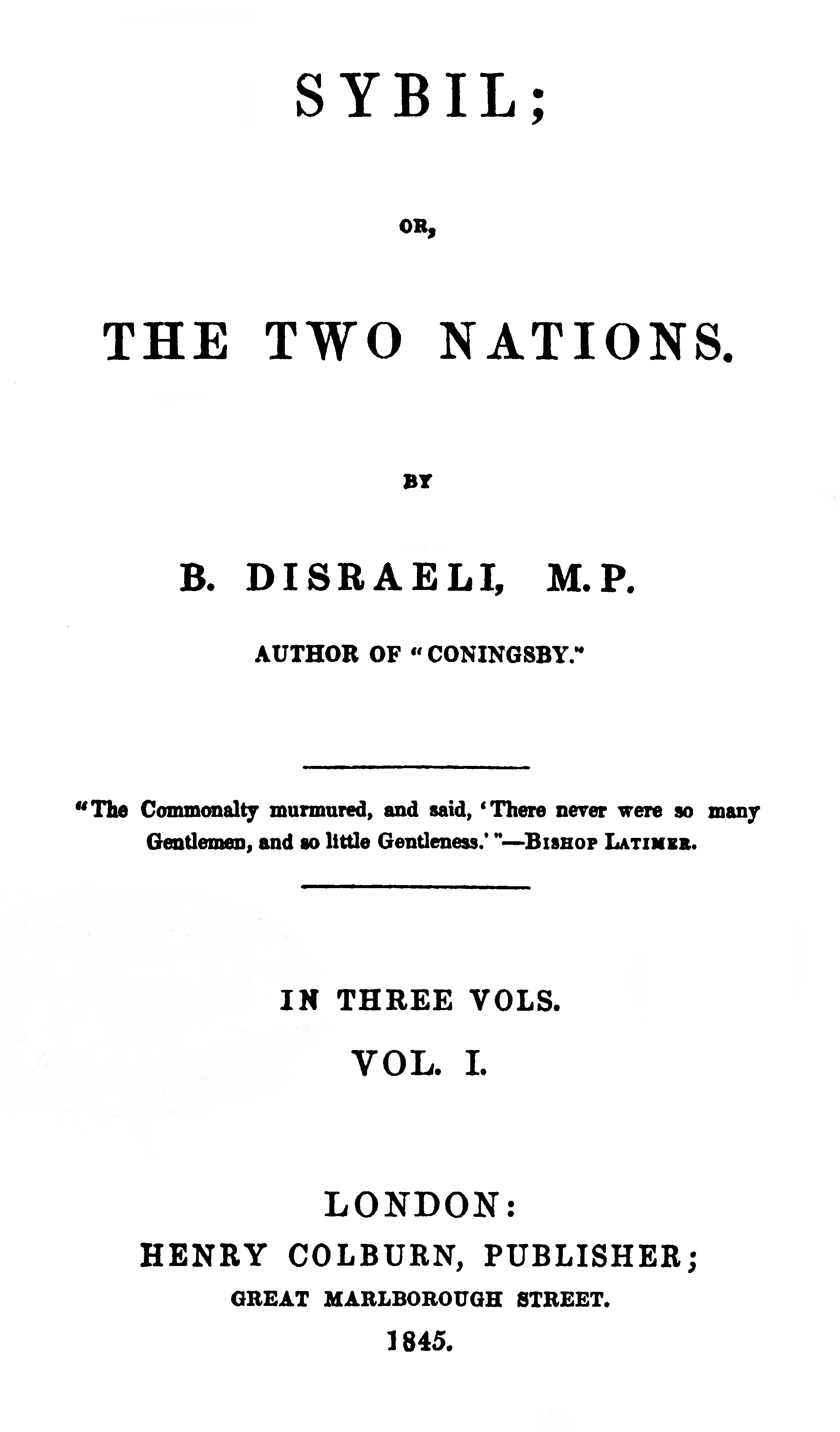
Title page of first edition of Sybil (1845)

Disraeli's novels are his main literary achievement. They have from the outset divided critical opinion. The writer R. W. Stewart observed that there have always been two criteria for judging Disraeli's novels—political and artistic. The critic Robert O'Kell, concurring, writes, "It is after all, even if you are a Tory of the staunchest blue, impossible to make Disraeli into a first-rate novelist. And it is equally impossible, no matter how much you deplore the extravagances and improprieties of his works, to make him into an insignificant one."

Disraeli's early "silver fork" novels Vivian Grey (1826) and The Young Duke (1831) featured romanticised depictions of aristocratic life (despite his ignorance of it) with character sketches of well-known public figures lightly disguised. In some of his early fiction Disraeli also portrayed himself and what he felt to be his Byronic dual nature: the poet and the man of action. His most autobiographical novel was Contarini Fleming (1832), an avowedly serious work that did not sell well. The critic William Kuhn suggests that Disraeli's fiction can be read as "the memoirs he never wrote", revealing the inner life of a politician for whom the norms of Victorian public life appeared to represent a social straitjacket—particularly with regard to what Kuhn sees as the author's "ambiguous sexuality".

Of the other novels of the early 1830s, Alroy is described by Blake as "profitable but unreadable", and The Rise of Iskander (1833) and The Infernal Marriage and Ixion in Heaven (1834) made little impact. Henrietta Temple (1837) was Disraeli's next major success. It draws on the events of his affair with Henrietta Sykes to tell the story of a debt-ridden young man torn between a mercenary loveless marriage and a passionate love at first sight for the eponymous heroine. Venetia (1837) was a minor work, written to raise much-needed cash.

In the 1840s Disraeli wrote a trilogy of novels with political themes. Coningsby attacks the evils of the Whig Reform Bill of 1832 and castigates the leaderless conservatives for not responding. Sybil; or, The Two Nations (1845) reveals Peel's betrayal over the Corn Laws. These themes are expanded in Tancred (1847). With Coningsby; or, The New Generation (1844), Disraeli, in Blake's view, "infused the novel genre with political sensibility, espousing the belief that England's future as a world power depended not on the complacent old guard, but on youthful, idealistic politicians." Sybil; or, The Two Nations was less idealistic than Coningsby; the "two nations" of its sub-title referred to the huge economic and social gap between the privileged few and the deprived working classes. The last was Tancred; or, The New Crusade (1847), promoting the Church of England's role in reviving Britain's flagging spirituality. Disraeli often wrote about religion, for he was a strong promoter of the Church of England. He was troubled by the growth of elaborate rituals in the late 19th century, such as the use of incense and vestments, and heard warnings to the effect that the ritualists were going to turn control of the Church of England over to the Pope. He consequently was a strong supporter of the Public Worship Regulation Act 1874 which allowed the archbishops to go to court to stop the ritualists.

Lothair was "Disraeli's ideological Pilgrim's Progress"; it tells a story of political life with particular regard to the roles of the Anglican and Roman Catholic churches. It reflected anti-Catholicism of the sort that was popular in Britain, and which fueled support for Italian unification ("Risorgimento"). Endymion, despite having a Whig as hero, is a last exposition of the author's economic policies and political beliefs. Disraeli continued to the last to pillory his enemies in barely disguised caricatures: the character St Barbe in Endymion is widely seen as a parody of Thackeray, who had offended Disraeli more than thirty years earlier by lampooning him in Punch as "Codlingsby". (Note: James D. Merritt advanced an alternative theory in 1968, proposing Thomas Carlyle as Disraeli's target.) Disraeli left an unfinished novel in which the priggish central character, Falconet, is unmistakably a caricature of Gladstone.

Blake commented that Disraeli "produced an epic poem, unbelievably bad, and a five-act blank verse tragedy, if possible worse. Further he wrote a discourse on political theory and a political biography, the Life of Lord George Bentinck, which is excellent ... remarkably fair and accurate."

=== Political ===
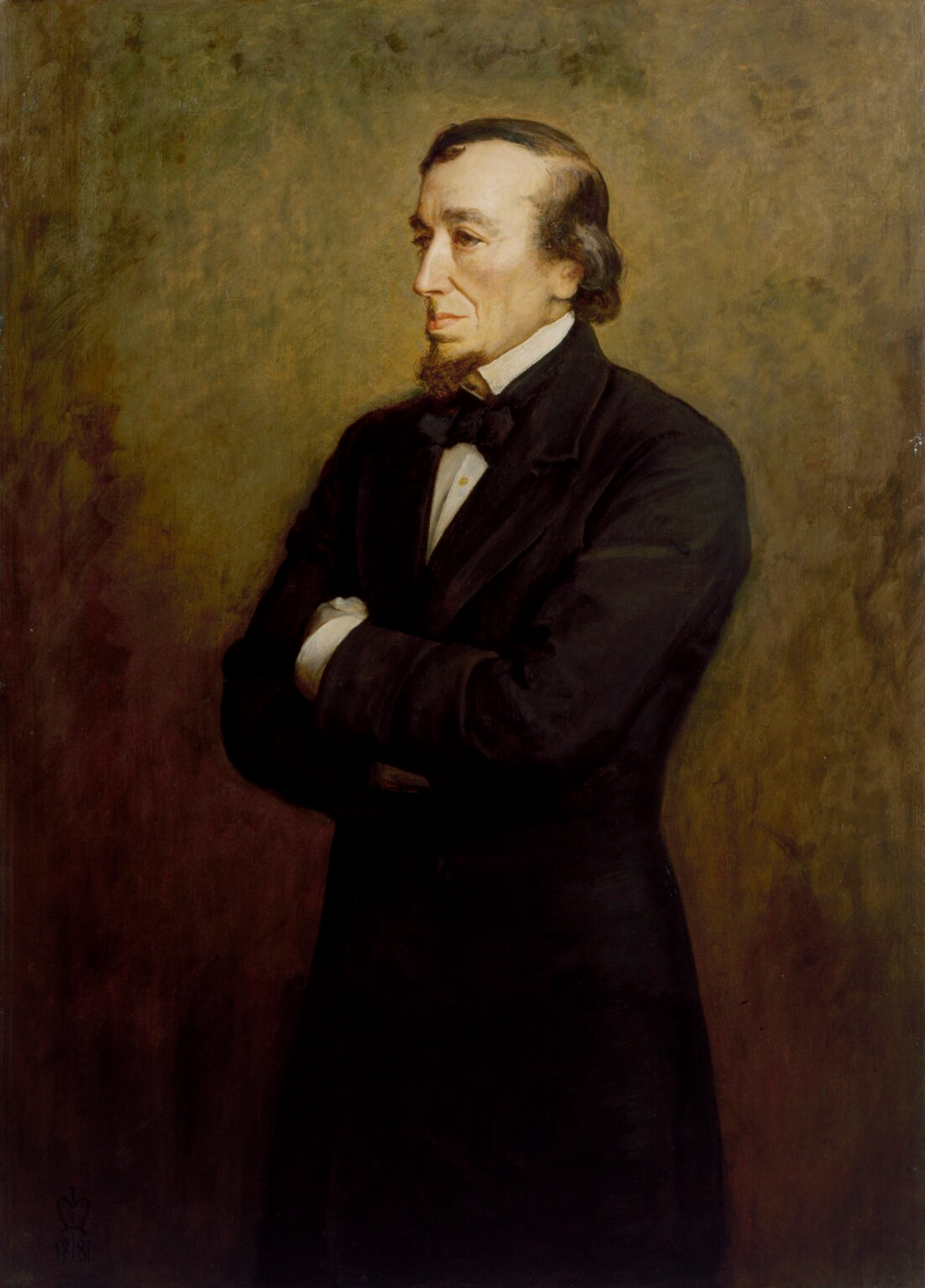
Portrait of Benjamin Disraeli by John Everett Millais, 1881

In the years after Disraeli's death, as Salisbury began his reign of more than twenty years over the Conservatives, the party emphasised the late leader's "One Nation" views, that the Conservatives at root shared the beliefs of the working classes, with the Liberals the party of the urban élite. The memory of Disraeli was used by the Conservatives to appeal to the working classes, with whom he was said to have had a rapport. This aspect of his policies has been re-evaluated by historians in the 20th and 21st centuries. In 1972 B. H. Abbott stressed that it was not Disraeli but Lord Randolph Churchill who invented the term "Tory democracy", though it was Disraeli who made it an essential part of Conservative policy and philosophy. In 2007 Parry wrote, "The tory democrat myth did not survive detailed scrutiny by professional historical writing of the 1960s [which] demonstrated that Disraeli had very little interest in a programme of social legislation and was very flexible in handling parliamentary reform in 1867." Despite this, Parry sees Disraeli, rather than Peel, as the founder of the modern Conservative party. The Conservative politician and writer Douglas Hurd wrote in 2013, "[Disraeli] was not a one-nation Conservative—and this was not simply because he never used the phrase. He rejected the concept in its entirety."

Disraeli's enthusiastic propagation of the British Empire has also been seen as appealing to working-class voters. Before his leadership of the Conservative Party, imperialism was the province of the Liberals, most notably Palmerston. Disraeli made the Conservatives the party that most loudly supported both the Empire and military action to assert its primacy. This came about in part because Disraeli's own views stemmed that way, in part because he saw advantage for the Conservatives, and partially in reaction against Gladstone, who disliked the expense of empire. Blake argued that Disraeli's imperialism "decisively orientated the Conservative party for many years to come, and the tradition which he started was probably a bigger electoral asset in winning working-class support during the last quarter of the century than anything else". Some historians have commented on a romantic impulse behind Disraeli's approach to Empire and foreign affairs: Abbott writes, "To the mystical Tory concepts of Throne, Church, Aristocracy and People, Disraeli added Empire." Others have identified a strongly pragmatic aspect to his policies. Gladstone's biographer Philip Magnus contrasted Disraeli's grasp of foreign affairs with that of Gladstone, who "never understood that high moral principles, in their application to foreign policy, are more often destructive of political stability than motives of national self-interest." In Parry's view, Disraeli's foreign policy "can be seen as a gigantic castle in the air (as it was by Gladstone), or as an overdue attempt to force the British commercial classes to awaken to the realities of European politics."

During his lifetime, Disraeli's opponents, and sometimes even his friends and allies, questioned whether he sincerely held the views he propounded, or whether they were adopted by him as politically essential and lacked conviction. Lord John Manners, in 1843 at the time of Young England, wrote, "could I only satisfy myself that D'Israeli believed all that he said, I should be more happy: his historical views are quite mine, but does he believe them?" Paul Smith, in his journal article on Disraeli's politics, argues that Disraeli's ideas were coherently argued over a political career of nearly half a century, and "it is impossible to sweep them aside as a mere bag of burglar's tools for effecting felonious entry to the British political pantheon."

External videos
- Booknotes interview with Stanley Weintraub on Disraeli: A Biography, February 6, 1994, C-SPAN

Stanley Weintraub, in his biography of Disraeli, points out that his subject did much to advance Britain towards the 20th century, carrying one of the two great Reform Acts of the 19th despite the opposition of his Liberal rival, Gladstone.

He helped preserve constitutional monarchy by drawing the Queen out of mourning into a new symbolic national role and created the climate for what became 'Tory democracy'. He articulated an imperial role for Britain that would last into World War II and brought an intermittently self-isolated Britain into the concert of Europe.

== Popular culture ==
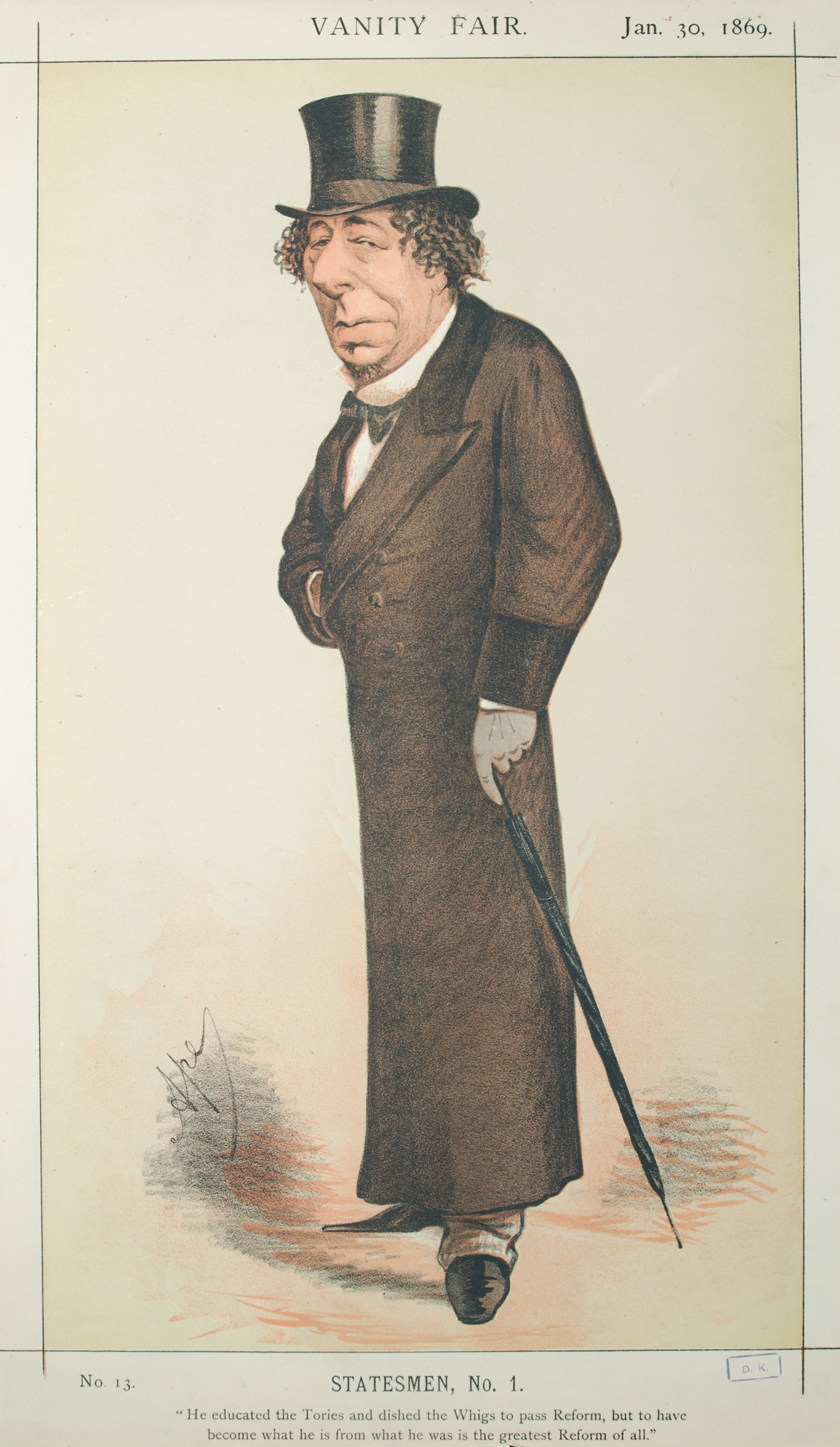
Disraeli, the first person caricatured in the London magazine Vanity Fair, 30 January 1869. Caricatures led to a rapid increase in demand for the magazine.

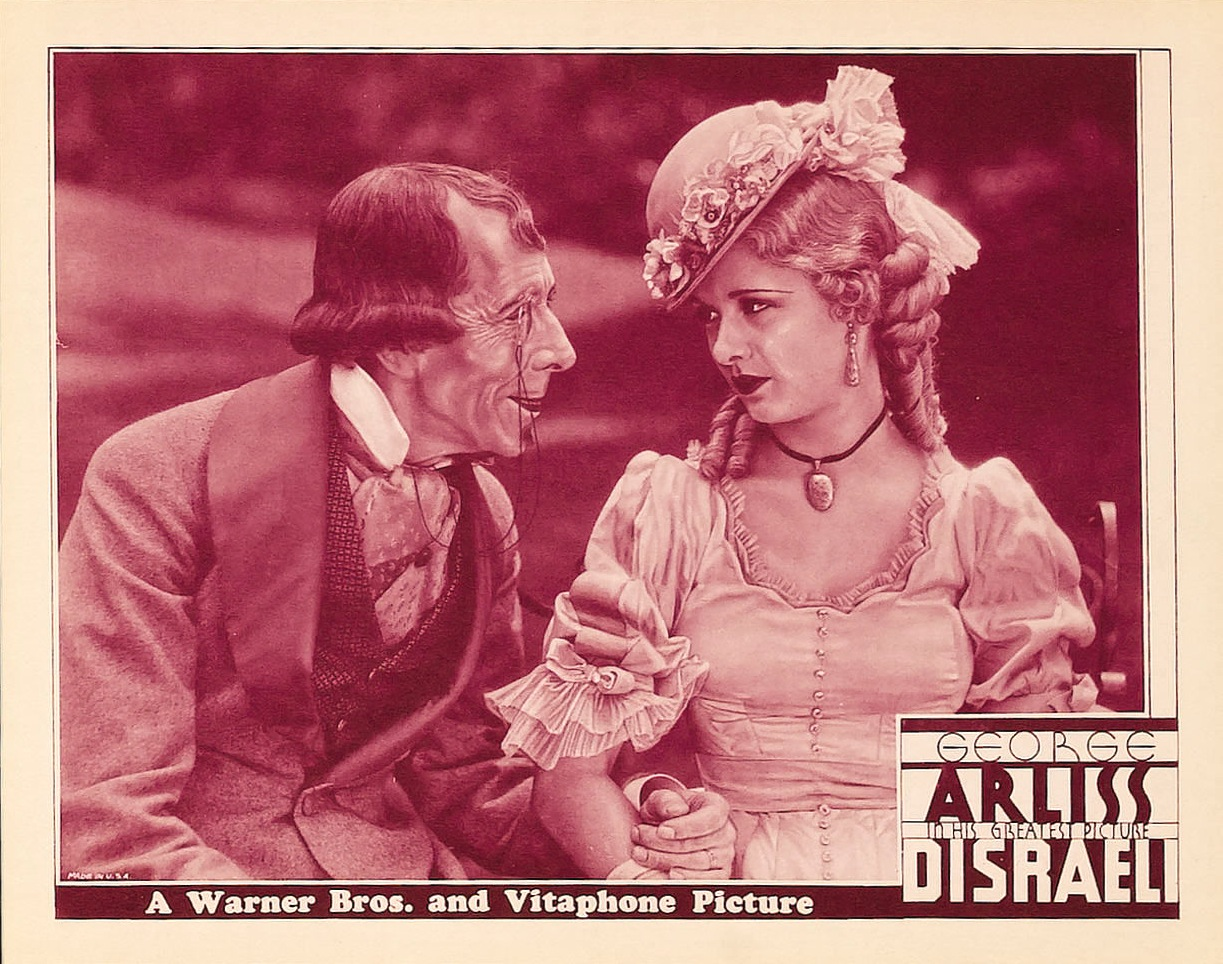
In 1929, actor George Arliss won the Oscar for personifying Disraeli's "paternalistic, kindly, homely statesmanship".

Historian Michael Diamond asserts that for British music hall patrons in the 1880s and 1890s, "xenophobia and pride in empire" were reflected in the halls' most popular political heroes: all were Conservatives and Disraeli stood out above all, even decades after his death, while Gladstone was used as a villain. Film historian Roy Armes has argued that historical films helped maintain the political status quo in Britain in the 1920s and 1930s by imposing an establishment viewpoint that emphasized the greatness of monarchy, empire, and tradition. The films created "a facsimile world where existing values were invariably validated by events in the film and where all discord could be turned into harmony by an acceptance of the status quo".

Steven Fielding has argued that Disraeli was an especially popular film hero: "historical dramas favoured Disraeli over Gladstone and, more substantively, promulgated an essentially deferential view of democratic leadership." Stage and screen actor George Arliss was known for his portrayals of Disraeli, winning the Academy Award for Best Actor for 1929's Disraeli. Fielding says Arliss "personified the kind of paternalistic, kindly, homely statesmanship that appealed to a significant proportion of the cinema audience ... Even workers attending Labour party meetings deferred to leaders with an elevated social background who showed they cared."

== Works ==
=== Novels ===
Disraeli polished his novels continually. Alroy was extensively revised in 1846. In 1853, publisher David Bryce issued reworked versions of all the novels up to Sybil in a uniform edition in which Disraeli's sister Sarah (1802–1859) played a significant editorial role. The collected editions published by Longmans, Green in 1870–1871 and 1881 provided the opportunity to make further changes, although these were generally minor. The 1870–1871 Longmans set in ten volumes was the last overseen by the author and is therefore considered "the most important collected edition of Disraeli's novels in the nineteenth century", although the 1881 set – the "Hughenden" edition in eleven volumes – included Endymion, arranged the novels in chronological order, and incorporated a few final alterations.

==== Early novels ====
- Vivian Grey (1826–1827)
- The Young Duke (1831)
- Contarini Fleming (1832)
- The Wondrous Tale of Alroy (1833)
- Henrietta Temple (1837)
- Venetia (1837)

==== Young England Trilogy ====
- Coningsby, or The New Generation (1844)
- Sybil, or The Two Nations (1845)
- Tancred, or The New Crusade (1847)

==== Late novels ====
- Lothair (1870)
- Endymion (1880)
- Falconet (unfinished, 1881; published posthumously in 1905)

=== Tales ===
Works of fiction ranging in length from short stories to long novellas.

- A True Story (1820) — published in Leigh Hunt's weekly magazine The Indicator when Disraeli was fifteen
- Popanilla (1828)
- Ixion in Heaven (1832–1833)
- The Rise of Iskander (1833)
- The Infernal Marriage (unfinished, 1834)
- A Year at Hartlebury (1834) — with Sarah Disraeli, under the pseudonyms Cherry and Fair Star
- The Carrier Pigeon (1835)
- The Consul's Daughter (1836)
- Walstein, or A Cure for Melancholy (1837)

=== Poetry ===
- The Revolutionary Epick (1834)

=== Drama ===
- The Tragedy of Count Alarcos (1839)

=== Non-fiction ===
- An Inquiry into the Plans, Progress, and Policy of the American Mining Companies (1825)
- Lawyers and Legislators, or Notes on the American Mining Companies (1825)
- The Present State of Mexico (1825)
- England and France, or A Cure for the Ministerial Gallomania (1832)
- What Is He? (1833)
- The Vindication of the English Constitution (1835)
- The Letters of Runnymede (1836)
- Lord George Bentinck (1852)

== Arms ==
Coat of arms of Benjamin Disraeli
Crest Issuant from a wreath of oak Proper a castle triple-towered Argent. Escutcheon Per saltire Gules and Argent a castle triple-towered in chief Argent two lions rampant in fess Sable and an eagle displayed in base Or. Supporters Dexter an eagle Or sinister a lion Or each gorged with a collar Gules and pendent therefrom an escutcheon of the last charged with a tower Argent. Motto Forti Nihili Difficile

== Notes and references ==
Notes

== Sources ==
- Abbott, B. H. (1972). Gladstone and Disraeli. London: Collins. ISBN 0-00-327210-9.
- Aldous, Richard (2007) [2006]. The Lion and the Unicorn: Gladstone vs Disraeli (first American ed.). New York: W W Norton & Company. ISBN 978-0-393-06570-1.
- Blake, Robert (1967) [1966]. Disraeli. New York: St Martin's Press. OCLC 400326. UK edition: London, Eyre & Spottiswoode, 1966.
- Blake, Robert (1982). Disraeli's Grand Tour: Benjamin Disraeli and the Holy Land, 1830–31. London: Weidenfeld and Nicolson. ISBN 0-297-77910-9.
- Bradford, Sarah (1982). Disraeli. London: Weidenfeld & Nicolson. ISBN 978-0-297-78153-0. US edition: New York, Stein and Day, 1983. ISBN 0-8128-2899-2
- Conacher, J. B. (1971). The Emergence of British Parliamentary Democracy in the Nineteenth Century. New York: John Wiley and Sons.
- Davis, Richard W. (1976). Disraeli. London: Hutchinson. ISBN 0-09-127690-X.
- Dickins, Gordon (1987). An Illustrated Literary Guide to Shropshire. Shrewsbury: Shropshire Libraries. ISBN 0-903802-37-6.
- Disraeli, Benjamin (1975). Swartz, Helen; Swartz, Marvin (eds.). Disraeli's Reminiscences. London: Hamish Hamilton. OCLC 471699820.
- Disraeli, Benjamin (1982). Gunn, J. A. W.; Weibe, M. G. (eds.). Benjamin Disraeli—Letters, 1815–1834. Toronto and London: University of Toronto Press. OCLC 59238073.
- Douglas, Roy (2005). Liberals: A History of the Liberal and Liberal Democrat Parties. London and New York: Hambledon and London. ISBN 0-8264-4342-7.
- Endelman, Todd M. (1998). "'A Hebrew to the End': The Emergence of Disraeli's Jewishness". In Richmond, Charles; Paul, Smith (eds.). The Self-Fashioning of Disraeli, 1818–1851. Cambridge: Cambridge University Press. ISBN 0-521-49729-9.
- Gash, Norman (1972). Sir Robert Peel: The Life of Sir Robert Peel After 1830. Totowa, New Jersey: Rowman and Littlefield. ISBN 0-87471-132-0.
- Glassman, Bernard (2003). Benjamin Disraeli: The Fabricated Jew in Myth and Memory. Lanham, MD: University Press of America. ISBN 0-7618-2472-3.
- Harris, Robin (2011). The Conservatives—A History. London: Bantam. ISBN 978-0-593-06511-2.
- Hibbert, Christopher (2004). Disraeli: A Personal History. London: HarperCollins. ISBN 0-00-714717-1.
- Hurd, Douglas; Young, Edward (2013). Disraeli, Or The Two Lives. London: Weidenfeld & Nicolson. ISBN 978-0-297-86097-6.
- Jenkins, Roy (2002) [1995]. Gladstone: A Biography. New York: Random House Trade Paperbacks. ISBN 0-8129-6641-4.
- Kirsch, Adam (2008). Benjamin Disraeli. Jewish Encounters. New York: Schocken. ISBN 978-0-8052-4249-2.
- Kuhn, William (2006). The Politics of Pleasure—A Portrait of Benjamin Disraeli. London: The Free Press. ISBN 0-7432-5687-5.
- Magnus, Philip (1954). Gladstone. London: John Murray. OCLC 752967336.
- Monypenny, William Flavelle; Buckle, George Earle (1929). The Life of Benjamin Disraeli, Earl of Beaconsfield. Vol. I, 1804–1859. London: John Murray. OCLC 60091922.
- Parry, Jonathan (2007). Benjamin Disraeli. Oxford: Oxford University Press. ISBN 978-0-19-921359-7. Text also available online at Oxford Dictionary of National Biography
- Richmond, Charles; Paul Smith (1999). The Self-Fashioning of Disraeli, 1818–1851. Cambridge and New York: Cambridge University Press. ISBN 0-521-49729-9.
- Ridley, Jane (1995). The Young Disraeli. London: Sinclair-Stevenson. ISBN 1-85619-250-4.
- Roberts, Andrew (2000) [1999]. Salisbury: Victorian Titan. London: Phoenix. ISBN 0-7538-1091-3.
- Schwarz, Daniel R (1979). Disraeli's Fiction. New York: Barnes & Noble. ISBN 0-06-496124-9.
- Swartz, Helen M; Swartz, Martin (1975). Disraeli's Reminiscences. London: Hamish Hamilton.
- Trevelyan, G. M. (1913) [1900]. The Life of John Bright. Boston and New York: Houghton Mifflin. OCLC 493021686.
- Weintraub, Stanley (1993). Disraeli: A Biography. New York: Truman Talley Books. ISBN 0-525-93668-8.
- Woodward, Llewellyn. (1962) The Age of Reform, 1815-1870 (Oxford University Press, 1938; 2nd ed. 1962) online.

Political offices
Preceded by Sir Charles Wood, Bt	Chancellor of the Exchequer; 1852	Succeeded by William Ewart Gladstone
Preceded by Lord John Russell	Leader of the House of Commons; 1852	Succeeded by Lord John Russell
Preceded by Sir George Lewis, Bt	Chancellor of the Exchequer; 1858–1859	Succeeded by William Ewart Gladstone
Preceded by The Viscount Palmerston	Leader of the House of Commons; 1858–1859	Succeeded by The Viscount Palmerston
Preceded by William Ewart Gladstone	Chancellor of the Exchequer; 1866–1868	Succeeded by George Ward Hunt
Preceded by William Ewart Gladstone	Leader of the House of Commons; 1866–1868	Succeeded by William Ewart Gladstone
Preceded by The Earl of Derby	Prime Minister of the United Kingdom; 1868	Succeeded by William Ewart Gladstone
Preceded by William Ewart Gladstone	Prime Minister of the United Kingdom; 1874–1880	Succeeded by William Ewart Gladstone
Preceded by William Ewart Gladstone	Leader of the House of Commons; 1874–1876	Succeeded by Sir Stafford Northcote, Bt
Preceded by The Earl of Malmesbury	Lord Privy Seal; 1876–1878	Succeeded by The Duke of Northumberland
Preceded by The Duke of Richmond	Leader of the House of Lords; 1876–1880	Succeeded by The Earl Granville
Parliament of the United Kingdom
Preceded by Abraham Wildey Robarts; Wyndham Lewis	Member of Parliament for Maidstone; 1837–1841; With: Wyndham Lewis 1837–1838; John Minet Fector 1838–1841	Succeeded by Alexander Beresford Hope; George Dodd
Preceded by Richard Jenkins; Robert Aglionby Slaney	Member of Parliament for Shrewsbury; 1841–1847; Served alongside: George Tomline	Succeeded by Edward Holmes Baldock; Robert Aglionby Slaney
Preceded by Caledon Du Pré; William Fitzmaurice; Christopher Tower	Member of Parliament for Buckinghamshire; 1847–1876; With: Caledon Du Pré 1847–1874; The Hon. Charles Cavendish 1847–1857; The Hon. William Cavendish 1857–1863; Sir Robert Bateson Harvey 1863–1868, 1874–1876; Nathaniel Lambert 1868–1876	Succeeded by Sir Robert Bateson Harvey; Nathaniel Lambert; Thomas Fremantle
Party political offices
Preceded by Marquess of Granby	Conservative Leader of the Commons; 1849–1876; With: Marquess of Granby; John Charles Herries 1849–1851	Succeeded by Sir Stafford Northcote, Bt
Preceded by The Earl of Derby	Leader of the Conservative Party; 1868–1881	Succeeded by The Marquess of Salisbury
Preceded by The Duke of Richmond	Leader of the Conservative Party in the House of Lords; 1876–1881	Succeeded by The Marquess of Salisbury
Academic offices
Preceded by The Earl of Derby	Rector of the University of Glasgow; 1871–1877	Succeeded by William Ewart Gladstone
Peerage of the United Kingdom
New creation	Earl of Beaconsfield; 1876–1881	Extinct
Records
Preceded by The Earl Russell	Oldest-living British prime minister 1878–1881	Succeeded by William Ewart Gladstone
