= The Rise of Iskander =

1833 novel by Benjamin Disraeli

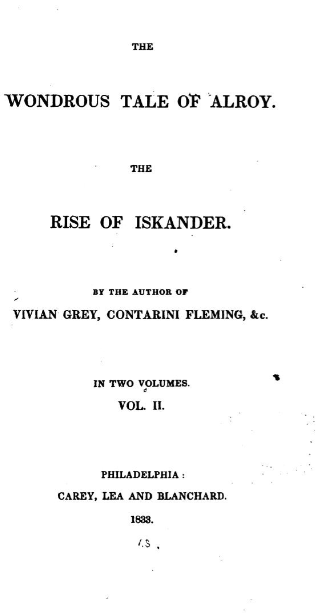
- Author: Benjamin Disraeli
- Language: English
- Genre: Novelette
- Publisher: Saunders and Otley
- Publication date: March 1833
- Media type: Print

The Rise of Iskander is the seventh novel written by Benjamin Disraeli who would later become Prime Minister of the United Kingdom.

== Background ==
The Rise of Iskander was written in Bath, England in the winter of 1832–3. It is based on the life of George Castriota, better known as Skanderbeg, a prince and national hero of Albania (which Disraeli had visited two years earlier on his Grand Tour). It was published in London in 1833 together with The Wondrous Tale of Alroy.

== Plot ==
Iskander was a young prince when his father's kingdom (Epirus) was taken over by the Turks. He was brought up a Moslem, although secretly remaining Christian. When his father died, the Turks saw Iskander's potential as an officer in their occupying armies (of the Emperor Amurath II). Iskander was posted to Athens, happily working with the Prince of Athens (Nicaeus, a Christian) suppressing Moslem insurrections.

Iskander receives news that he has been commissioned to leave Athens to help the Turkish armies fight off a Christian invasion led by Hunniades in Albania. Iskander leaves reluctantly and on reaching the Epirot division of the army he is to command (under the overall command of Karam Bey), Iskander secretly visits Hunniades, meeting his beautiful daughter, Iduna. Iskander reveals to Hunniades the Turks’ battle plan for the following day and also agrees to withhold his division from the battle, instead leaving the field to raise the standard of Christian independence.

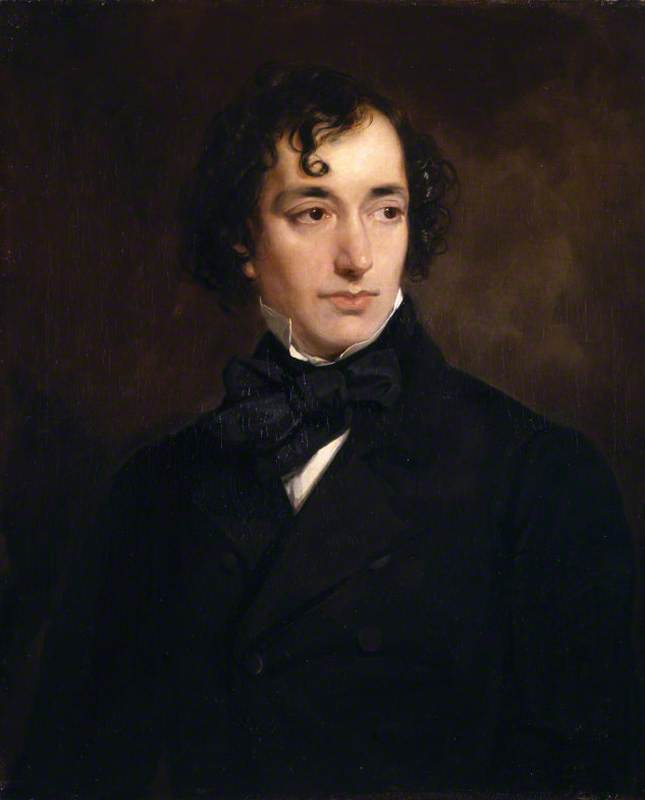
A retrospective portrayal (1852) of Disraeli as a young man when he wrote The Rise of Iskander

Everything goes to plan and Iskander and his men head off and take Croia, the capital of Epirus. Throughout Epirus there are uprisings against the Turks who are ousted. Nicaeus joins Iskander and they receive word from Hunniades that although he has been successful and captured Karam Bey, Iduna has been taken prisoner. She is being held at Adrianople (the Turkish capital) where Amurath's son, Mohamed, has taken a fancy to her so the Turks are refusing to exchange her for hostages.

Iskander and Nicaeus, who is in love with Iduna despite her having previously rejected his advances, go to Adrianople disguised as an Armenian doctor and his page. There they learn that Iduna is ill and Mohamed is offering a reward for anyone who can cure her. Through one of Mohamed's eunuchs (Kaflis), Iskander and Nicaeus gain access to Mohamed, who permits Kaflis to show them to Iduna.

Talking to Iduna in Greek, which Kaflis doesn't understand, Iskander tells her they have come to rescue her. He doesn't reveal his true identity but does disclose that his companion is Nicaeus. Mohamed is impressed as Iduna's health improves over the next few days and asks “the doctor” to arrange for him to kill Iskander, who just promises that he (Mohamed) will meet Iskander if he thrashes his scimitar in a particular lake.

As Mohamed is planning for Iduna to accompany him at the head of his army marching on Epirus, Iskander and Nicaeus effect Iduna's escape. The three flee Adrianopole on horse but are pursued by the Turks. With their horses tiring, Iskander resolves to confront alone their pursuers, giving time for Nicaeus and Iduna to get further ahead. At this point Iskander reveals his identity to Iduna. He has feelings for her and sees that she is not particularly affectionate towards Nicaeus. Iskander single-handedly defeats all the chasing Turks.

Nicaeus and Iduna reach Epirus with Nicaeus feeling jealousy for Iskander on seeing how melancholy Iduna is in his absence. He resolves that marrying Iduna is more important than his country and Iskander who should not set eyes on Iduna again unless she is Nicaeus's bride. When Iduna rejects him again, Nicaeus imprisons her, saying she will never see her father again unless she marries him.

Iduna escapes and runs to a forest where she comes across Mohamed thrashing his scimitar in the lake, whereupon Iskander appears. Mohamed reveals it is a trap and instructs his soldiers to arrest Iskander, whereupon Iskander reveals he has comes with Hunniades and his men. Then Nicaeus (in pursuit of Iduna) arrives.

The Turks and Christians resolve to have a battle the next day and Mohamed leaves. Nicaeus also departs, disgraced. In the battle the following day, Nicaeus fights heroically with Iskander and Hunniades and dies of his wounds afterwards. The Turks are defeated and retreat. Iskander is proclaimed king of Epirus and is married to Iduna.

== Reception ==
The Rise of Iskander quickly slipped into obscurity despite some literary merit.

A contemporary critic in the American Monthly Review wrote, "The story is pleasantly told, and is altogether the most unexceptional of any work of fiction from the author's pen that we have seen."

A more modern review, however, draws attention to the novel's unique status as "the first and most notable instance of a literary adaptation of the Scanderbeg theme in English prose and... seemingly the only work of English prose focussing on... Albanian subject matter".

== Political significance ==
The Rise of Iskander is typical of Disraeli's early fiction which featured messianistic heroes, “whose political aims concentrated on national renewal because [Disraeli] also saw himself as a person of great promise who was strongly committed to upholding Britain’s place in the world and its imperial authority.” Nevertheless, in his foreign policy as Prime Minister Disraeli showed little sympathy for the plight of countries like Albania, supporting the Ottoman Empire out of fear of Russian expansionism. The novelette has therefore been characterised as, "a romantic inversion of his later theme of 'Peace with Honour'."
