= Paul Smith (historian) =

British historian of Victorian England (born 1937)

Paul Smith (born 1937) is a British historian of Victorian England.

In 1972 Smith edited a collection of Lord Salisbury's articles that he had written for the Quarterly Review. Vernon Bogdanor said that Smith's lengthy introduction explaining Salisbury's politics was "extremely perceptive ... This is the best thing that has been written on Salisbury since Lady Gwendolen Cecil's unfinished biography". University of Illinois historian Walter L. Arnstein called Smith's introduction "a gem, judicious, well-reasoned, persuasive, [and] brilliant".

== Works ==
- Disraelian Conservatism and Social Reform (London: Routledge & Kegan Paul, 1967).
- (editor), Lord Salisbury on Politics: A selection from his articles in the Quarterly Review, 1860-1883 (Cambridge: Cambridge University Press, 1972).
- Disraeli: A Brief Life (Cambridge: Cambridge University Press, 1996).
- (editor), Government and the Armed Forces in Britain, 1856-1990 (London: The Hambledon Press, 1996).
- (editor, with Charles Richmond), The Self-Fashioning of Disraeli, 1818–1851 (Cambridge: Cambridge University Press, 1999).
- (editor), Bagehot: The English Constitution (Cambridge: Cambridge University Press, 2001).
