= Theosophy and literature =

According to some literary and religious studies scholars, modern Theosophy had a certain influence on contemporary literature, particularly in forms of genre fiction such as fantasy and science fiction. Researchers claim that Theosophy has significantly influenced the Irish literary renaissance of the late 19th and early 20th centuries, notably in such figures as W. B. Yeats and G. W. Russell.

== Classic writers and Theosophists ==
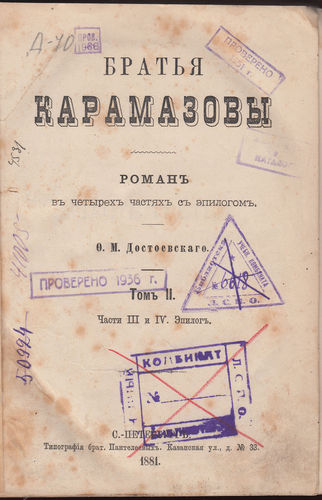
A novel The Brothers Karamazov, Vol. II

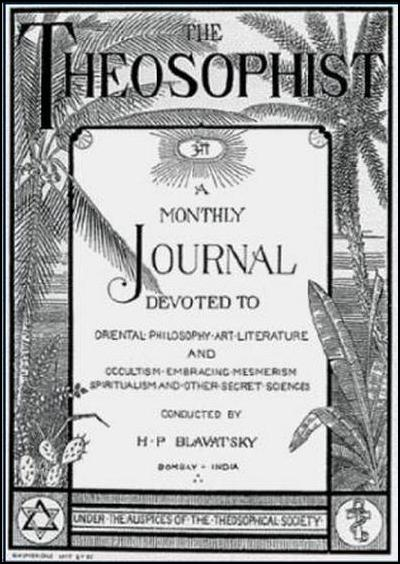
A journal The Theosophist, Bombay

=== Dostoevsky ===
In November 1881, Helena Blavatsky, editor in chief of The Theosophist, started publishing her translation into English of "The Grand Inquisitor" from Book V, chapter five of Fyodor Dostoevsky's novel The Brothers Karamazov. (Note: "Blavatsky was so impressed by Dostoevskii's The Brothers Karamazov that she translated... 'The Grand Inquisitor' for publication in The Theosophist.") (Note: In Brendan French's opinion, it is difficult to assume that, apart from Blavatsky, anyone else translated Dostoevsky into English until 1912, when a translation by Constance Garnett was issued.)

In a small commentary which preceded the beginning of the publication, she explained that "the great Russian novelist" Dostoevsky died a few months before, making the "celebrated" novel The Brothers Karamazov his last work. She described the passage as a "satire" on modern theology in general and on the Roman Catholic Church in particular. As described by Blavatsky, "The Grand Inquisitor" imagines the Second Coming of Christ occurring in Spain during the time of the Inquisition. Christ is at once arrested as a heretic by the Grand Inquisitor. The legend, or "poem", is created by the character Ivan Karamazov, a materialist and an atheist, who tells it to his younger brother Alyosha, an immature Christian mystic." (Note: After the first publication in 1881, Blavatsky's translation was reprinted several times.)

According to Brendan French, a researcher in esotericism, "it is highly significant" that [exactly 8 years after her publication of "The Grand Inquisitor"] Blavatsky declared Dostoevsky to be "a theosophical writer." In her article about the approach of a new era in both society and literature, called "The Tidal Wave", she wrote:

"[The root of evil lies, therefore, in a moral, not in a physical cause.] If asked what is it then that will help, we answer boldly:—Theosophical literature; hastening to add that under this term, neither books concerning adepts and phenomena, nor the Theosophical Society publications are meant... What the European world now needs is a dozen writers such as Dostoyevsky, the Russian author... It is writers of this kind that are needed in our day of reawakening; not authors writing for wealth or fame, but fearless apostles of the living Word of Truth, moral healers of the pustulous sores of our century... To write novels with a moral sense in them deep enough to stir Society, requires a literary talent and a born Theosophist as was Dostoyevsky."

=== Tolstoy ===
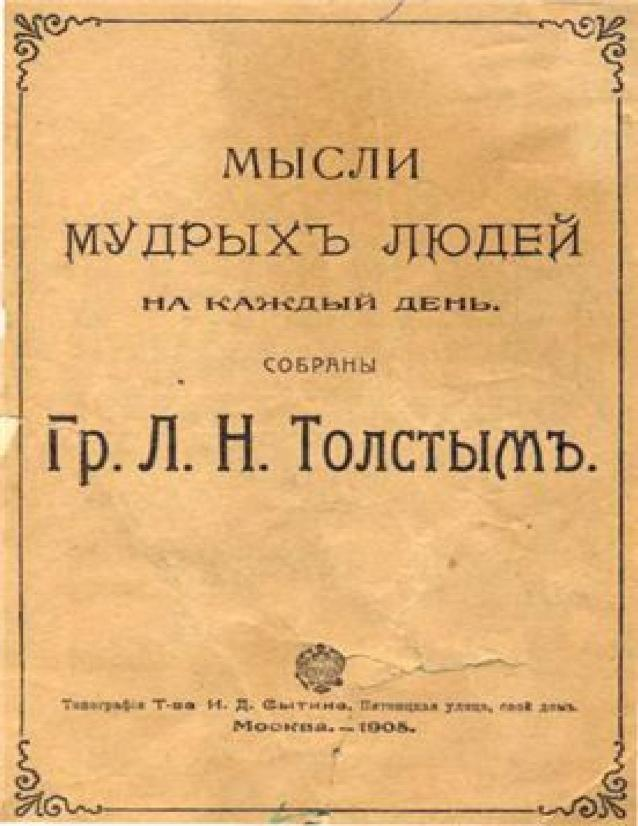
The Thoughts of Wise People for Every Day (1905)

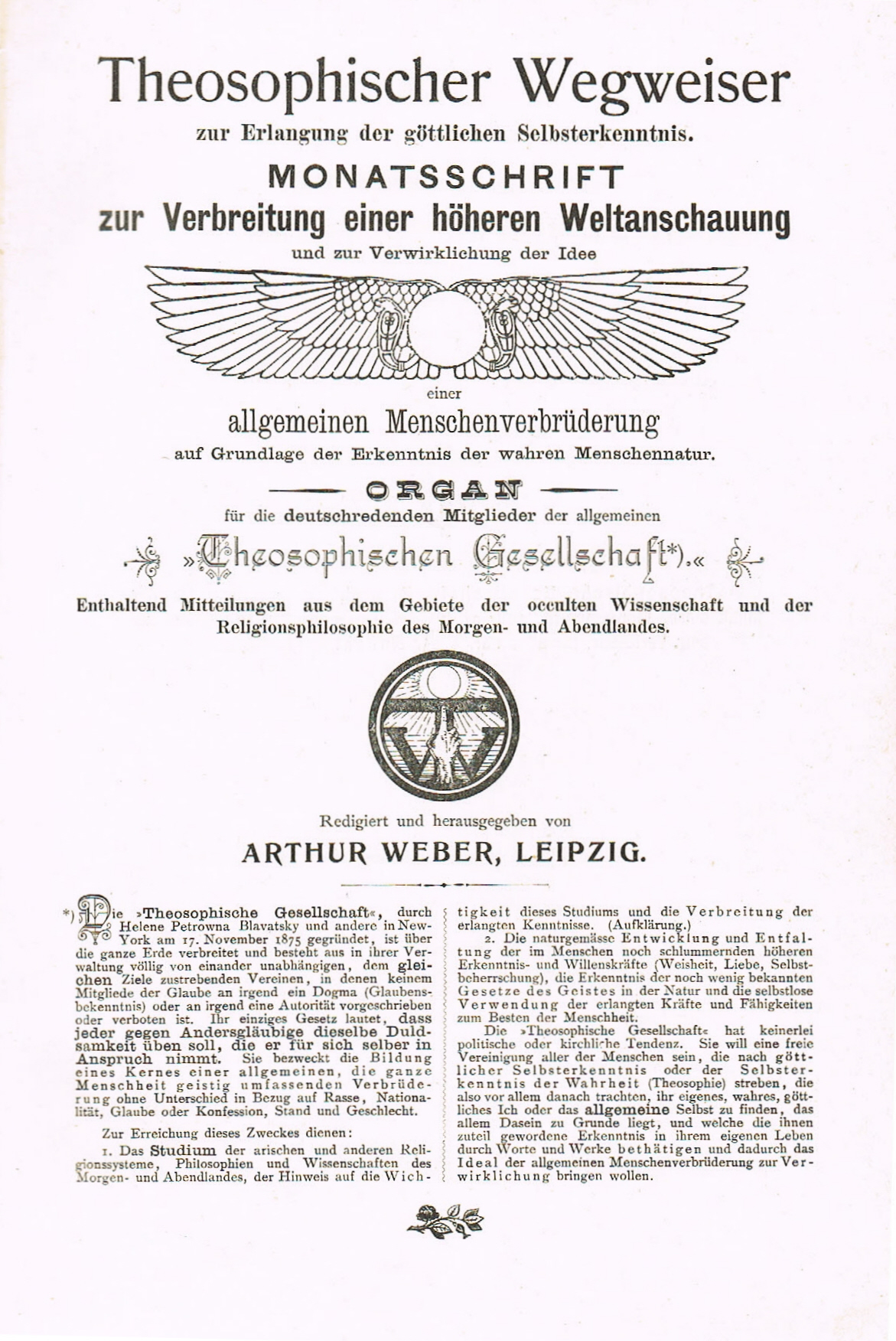
A magazine of the Theosophical Society of Germany, c. 1902

When Leo Tolstoy was working on his book The Thoughts of Wise People for Every Day, he used a magazine of the Theosophical Society of Germany Theosophischer Wegweiser. He extracted eight aphorisms of the Indian sage Ramakrishna, eight from The Voice of the Silence by Blavatsky, and one of fellow Theosophist Franz Hartmann, from the issues of 1902 and 1903, and translated them into Russian. Tolstoy had in his library the English edition of The Voice of the Silence, which had been presented to him by its author. (Note: Maria Carlson stated that Tolstoy liked Blavatsky's "devotional work", The Voice of the Silence, and was familiar with several of the leading Theosophists.)

In November 1889, Blavatsky published her own English translation of Tolstoy's fairy tale "How A Devil's Imp Redeemed His Loaf, or The First Distiller", which was accompanied by a small preface about the features of translation from Russian. Calling Tolstoy "the greatest novelist and mystic of Russia of to-day," she wrote that all his best works had already been translated, but that the attentive Russian reader would not find the "popular national spirit" that permeates all original stories and fairy tales, in any of these translations. Despite the fact that they are full of "popular mysticism", and some of them are "charming", they are the most difficult to translate into a foreign language. She concluded: "No foreign translator, however able, unless born and bred in Russia and acquainted with Russian peasant life, will be able to do them justice, or even to convey to the reader their full meaning, owing to their absolutely national idiomatic language."

In September 1890, Blavatsky published philosopher Raphael von Koeber's article "Leo Tolstoi and his Unecclesiastical Christianity" in her magazine Lucifer. Prof. von Koeber briefly described the merits of Tolstoy as a great master of artistic language, but the main focus of the article was Tolstoy's search for answers to religious and philosophical questions. The author concluded that Tolstoy's "philosophy of life" is identical in its foundation to that of Theosophy.

Theosophist Charles Johnston, president of the New York branch of the Irish Literary Society,Johnston travelled to Russia and met with Tolstoy. In March 1899 Johnston published "How Count Tolstoy Writes?" in the American magazine The Arena. In November 1904, Rudolf Steiner gave a lecture in Berlin entitled "Theosophy and Tolstoy", where he discussed the novels War and Peace, Anna Karenina, the novella The Death of Ivan Ilyich, and the philosophical book On Life (1886–87).

=== Yeats ===
External videos
- Poem by W. B. Yeats
- "Mohini Chatterjee (Meditations upon Death)" (Note: It has been first published in 1929 under the title "Meditations upon Death," one was reissued in 1932 as "Mohini Chatterji.")

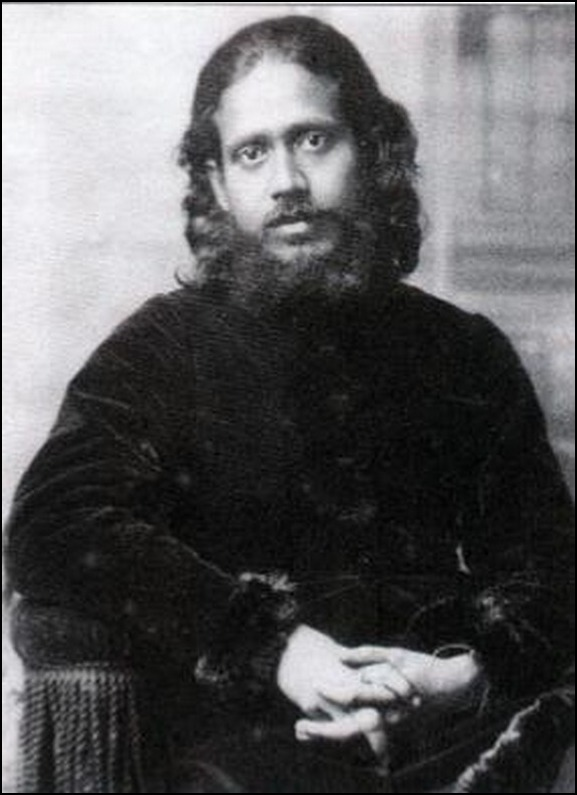
M. Chatterji (Note: In 1885, a Hindu Theosophist Mohini Chatterji has paid visit into Dublin at the invitation of the Hermetic Society, which president was Yeats.), 1884

Yeats became interested in Theosophy in 1884, after reading Esoteric Buddhism by Alfred Percy Sinnett. A copy of the book was sent him by his aunt, Isabella Varley. Together with his friends George Russell (Note: An Irish writer George Russell, Yeats's friend, was "a life-long Theosophist.") and Charles Johnston, he established the Dublin Hermetic Society, which would later become the Irish section of the Theosophical Society. According to Encyclopedia of Occultism and Parapsychology (EOP), Yeats's tendency toward mysticism was "stimulated" by the religious philosophy of the Theosophical Society.

In 1887, Yeats's family moved to London, where he was introduced to Blavatsky by his friend Johnston. In her external appearance she reminded him of "an old Irish peasant woman". He recalled her massive figure, constant cigarette smoking, and unceasing work at her writing desk which, he claimed, "she did for twelve hours a day." He respected her "sense of humor, her dislike of formalism, her abstract idealism, and her intense, passionate nature." At the end of 1887, she officially founded the Blavatsky Lodge of the Theosophical Society in London. Yeats entered into the Esoteric Section of the Lodge in December 1888 and became a member of the "Recording Committee for Occult Research" in December 1889. In August 1890, to his great regret, he was expelled from the Society for undertaking occult experiments forbidden by the Theosophists.

According to The Encyclopedia of Fantasy (EF), Yeats wrote extensively on mysticism and magic. In 1889 he published an article—"Irish Fairies, Ghosts, Witches, etc."—in Blavatsky's journal, and another in 1914—"Witches and Wizards and Irish Folk-Lore". Literary scholar Richard Ellmann wrote of him:

"Yeats found in occultism, and in mysticism generally, a point of view which had the virtue of warring with accepted belief... He wanted to secure proof that experimental science was limited in its results, in an age when science made extravagant claims; he wanted evidence that an ideal world existed, in an age which was fairly complacent about the benefits of actuality; he wanted to show that the current faith in reason and in logic ignored a far more important human faculty, the imagination."

== Poetry and mysticism ==
According to Gertrude Marvin Williams, British poet Alfred Tennyson was reading Blavatsky's "mystical poem" The Voice of the Silence in the last days of his life.

In his article on Blavatsky, Prof. Russell Goldfarb (Note: "Russell M. Goldfarb is a professor of English at Western Michigan University.") mentions a lecture by American psychologist and philosopher William James in which he said that "mystical truth spoke best as musical composition rather than as conceptual speech." As evidence for this, James cited this passage from The Voice of the Silence in his book The Varieties of Religious Experience:

"He, who would hear the voice of Nada, 'the Soundless Sound,'
and comprehend it, he has to learn the nature of Dhāranā...

When to himself his form appears unreal,
as do on waking all the forms he sees in dreams;
when he has ceased to hear the many, he may discern
the One—the inner sound which kills the outer...

For then the soul will hear, and will remember.
And then to the inner ear will speak
The Voice Of The Silence...

And now thy Self is lost in Self,
thyself unto Thyself, merged in
that Self from which thou first didst radiate...

Behold! thou hast become the Light, thou has become the Sound,
thou art thy Master and thy God.
Thou art Thyself the object of thy search;
the Voice unbroken, that resounds throughout eternities,
exempt from change, from sin exempt,
the seven sounds in one,
the Voice Of The Silence.
Om tat Sat."

(Note: "Om Tat Sat, a Sanskrit mantra meaning 'Om that is being.' Sacred words that are used to invoke a deity.")

In Buddhist writer Dennis Lingwood's opinion, the author of The Voice of the Silence (abbreviated VS) "seeks more to inspire than to instruct, appeals to the heart rather than to the head." A researcher of NRM Arnold Kalnitsky wrote that, in spite of inevitable questions on the origins and authorship of VS, (Note: Blavatsky was, as she claimed, only a translator of the ancient text.) the "authenticity of the tone of the teachings and the expression of the sentiments" have risen above the Theosophical and occult environment, receiving "independent respect" from such authorities as William James, D. T. Suzuki and others.

Russian esotericist P. D. Ouspensky affirmed that VS has a "very special" position in modern mystical literature, and used several quotes from it in his book Tertium Organum to demonstrate "the wisdom of the East." Writer Howard Murphet has called VS a "little gem", noting that its poetry "is rich in both imagery and mantra-like vibrations." Annie Besant characterized the language of VS as "perfect and beautiful English, flowing and musical."

In Prof. Robert Ellwood's opinion, the book is a "short mystical devotional work of rare beauty." Other scholars of religious studies have suggested that: a rhythmic modulation in VS supports "the feeling of mystical devotion"; the questions illumined in VS are "explicitly devoted to the attainment of mystical states of consciousness"; and that VS is among the "most spiritually practical works produced by Blavatsky."

William James said of mysticism that: "There is a verge of the mind which these things haunt; and whispers therefrom mingle with the operations of our understanding, even as the waters of the infinite ocean send their waves to break among the pebbles that lie upon our shores."

== Theosophical fiction ==
=== Forerunner ===
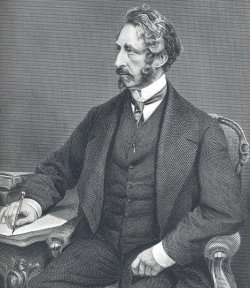
Edward Bulwer-Lytton

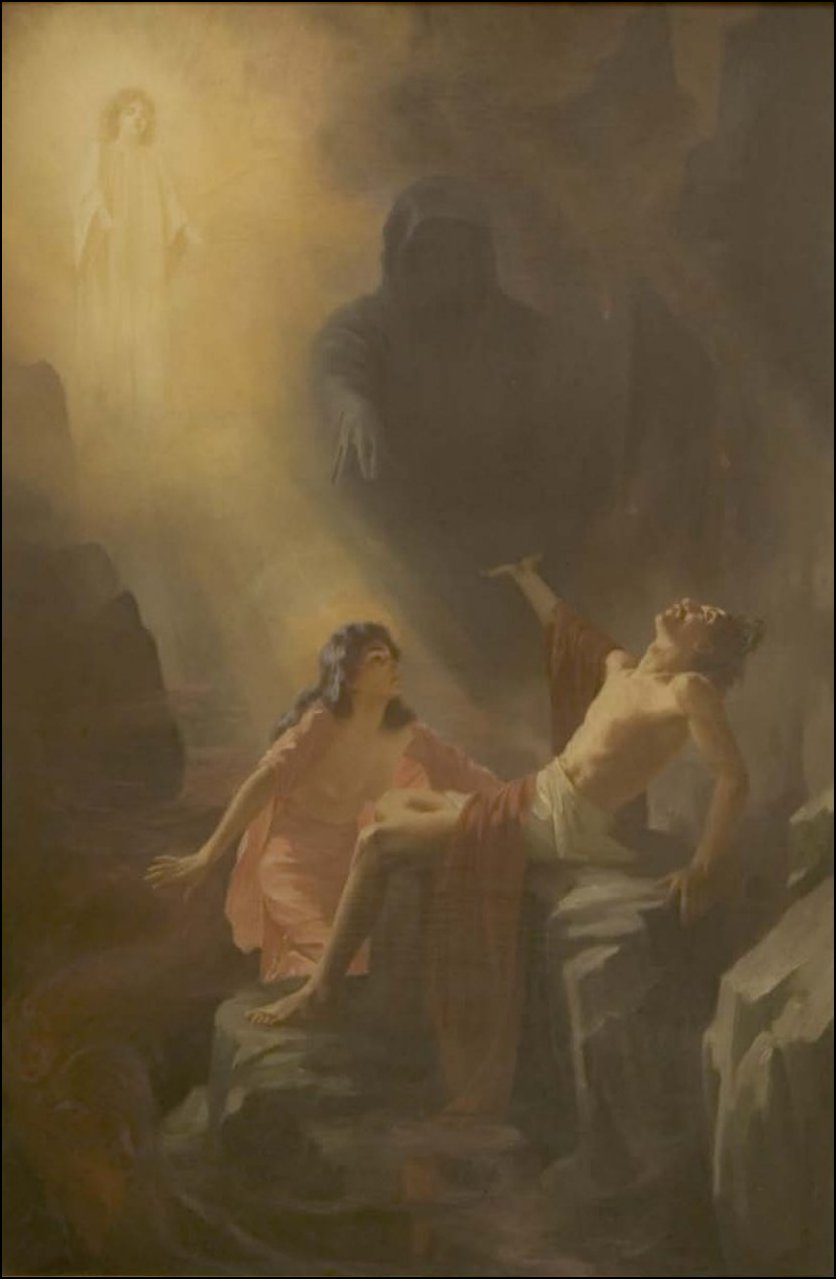
The Dweller on the Threshold, painted by R. Machell (1854–1927)

According to scholar Brendan French, novels by authors in the Rosicrucian tradition are a path to the "conceptual domain" of Blavatsky. He notes that Zanoni (1842) by Edward Bulwer-Lytton is "undoubtedly the apogee of the genre". It was this novel that later had the greatest impact on the elaboration of the concept of the Theosophical mahatmas. French quoted Blavatsky as saying: "No author in the world of literature ever gave a more truthful or more poetical description of these beings than Sir E. Bulwer-Lytton, the author of Zanoni."

This novel is especially important for followers of occultism because of "the suspicion—actively fostered by its author—that the work is not a fictional account of a mythical fraternity, but an accurate depiction of a real brotherhood of immortals." According to EF, Bulwer-Lytton's character the "Dweller on the Threshold" has since become widely used by followers of Theosophy and authors of "weird fiction".

A second important novel for Theosophists by Bulwer-Lytton is The Coming Race published in 1871.

=== Theosophists as fiction writers ===
According to French, Theosophy has contributed much to the expansion of occultism in fiction. Not only were Theosophists writing occult fiction, but many professional authors who were prone to mysticism joined the Theosophical Society. Russian literary scholar Anatoly Britikov wrote that the "Theosophical myth is beautiful and poetic" because its authors had an "extraordinary talent for fiction", and borrowed their ideas from works of "high literary value."

In John Clute's opinion, Blavatsky's own fiction, most of which was published in 1892 in the collection Nightmare Tales, is "unimportant". (Note: Almost all of her stories are about psychic phenomena, karma, reincarnation, and secrets.) However, her main philosophical works, Isis Unveiled and The Secret Doctrine, can be considered as rich sources that contain "much raw material for creators of fantasy worlds". He wrote that in its content, supported by an attendant entourage that intensifies its effect, Theosophy is a "sacred drama, a romance, a secret history" of the world. Those whose souls are "sufficiently evolved to understand that drama know the tale is enacted in another place, beyond the threshold... within a land exempt from secular accident." (Note: Russian literary critic Zinaida Vengerova complimented Blavatsky as an artist of the word, although she considered only her Russian publications.)

In Prof. Antoine Faivre's opinion, Ghost Land, or Researches into the Mysteries of Occultism by Emma Hardinge Britten, one of the founders of the Theosophical movement, is "one of the principal works of fiction inspired by the occultist current".

Mabel Collins, (Note: "An important but shadowy figure in the Theosophical Society during the latter part of the nineteenth century.") who helped Blavatsky edit the Theosophical journal Lucifer in London, wrote a book entitled The Blossom and the Fruit: A True Story of a Black Magician (1889). According to EOP the book demonstrated her growing interest in metaphysics and occultism. After leaving editorial work, however, she published several books (Note: In particular, Morial the Mahatma, or The Black Master of Tibet (1892)) that parodied Blavatsky and her Masters.

Franz Hartmann has published several fiction works: An Adventure among the Rosicrucians (1887), (Note: Blavatsky called this work by Hartmann an unusual and strange story, "full of poetic feeling" which, moreover, contains "deep philosophical and occult truths.") the Theosophical satire The Talking Image of Urur (1890), and Among the Gnomes (1895)—a satire on those who immediately deny everything "supernatural". Russian philologist Alexander Senkevich noted that Blavatsky perfectly understood that the titular 'Talking Image' was her "caricatured persona", but nevertheless continued publishing the novel in her magazine for many months. In the foreword to the first edition its author proclaimed that the characters of the novel are "so to say, composite photographs of living people", and that it was created "with the sole object of showing to what absurdities a merely intellectual research after spiritual truths will lead." (Note: The real figures of the Theosophical history, who served as the prototypes for Hartmann's characters, are viewed quite easily in the novel: Image of Urur, a mediator between the Society for Distribution of Wisdom and a Mysterious Brotherhood of Adepts— Helena Blavatsky; captain Bumpkins—colonel Henry Olcott; Mr. Puffer—Alfred Percy Sinnett, Mme. and Mssr. Corneille—Mme. and Mssr. Coulomb; Rev. Sniff—Rev. George Patterson; Mr. Bottler, a representative of the Society for the Discovery of Unknown Sciences—Hodgson from the Society for Psychical Research, etc.) "The end of Hartmann's novel is unexpected. The evil forces that held the 'Talking Image' weaken, and it is freed from the darkening of consciousness. The author's final conclusion is quite a Buddhist one: 'Search for the truth yourself: do not entrust this to someone else'."

The Theosophical leaders William Quan Judge, Charles Webster Leadbeater, Anna Kingsford, and others wrote so-called "weird stories". In his fiction collection, Leadbeater gave a brief description of Blavatsky as a storyteller of occult tales: "She held her audience spell-bound, she played on them as on an instrument and made their hair rise at pleasure, and I have often noticed how careful they were to go about in couples after one of her stories, and to avoid being alone even for a moment!" The novel Karma by Alfred Sinnett is, in essence, a presentation of the Theosophical doctrines of karma and reincarnation, using knowledge of past lives and the present karma of the leading characters. His next occult novel United, was published in 1886 in 2 volumes. (Note: Blavatsky called this novel a "remarkable work", not only because of its "undeniable" literary merits, but also because of its "psychic" qualities.)

A trilogy The Initiate (1920–32) by Cyril Scott was extremely popular and reprinted several times. In it the author expounds his understanding of the Theosophical doctrine, using fictional characters alongside real ones.

=== Fiction writers and Theosophy ===
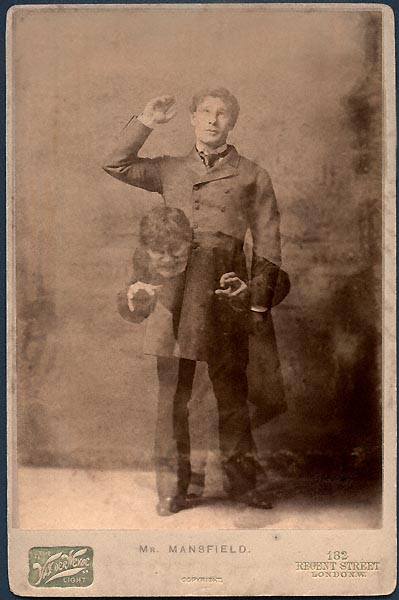
Dr. Jekyll and Mr. Hyde, ca. 1887

In 1887, Blavatsky published the article "The Signs of the Times", in which she discussed the growing influence of Theosophy in literature. She listed some novels that can be categorized as Theosophical and mystical literature, including Mr Isaacs (1882) and Zoroaster (1885) by Francis Marion Crawford; The Romance of Two Worlds (1886) by Marie Corelli; The Strange Case of Dr Jekyll and Mr Hyde (1886) by Robert Louis Stevenson; (Note: In Blavatsky's opinion, Stevenson had a "glimpse of a true vision" when he wrote his novel which should be considered as a "true allegory." Every student of occultism would recognize in Mr. Hyde an "obsessor of the personality.") A Fallen Idol (1886) by F. Anstey; King Solomon's Mines (1885) and She: A History of Adventure (1887) by H. Rider Haggard; Affinities (1885) and The Brother of the Shadow (1886) by Rosa Campbell Praed; A House of Tears (1886) by Edmund Downey; and A Daughter of the Tropics (1887) by Florence Marryat.

According to EOP, the prototype for the main character of Crawford's novel Mr Isaacs was someone called Mr. Jacob, a Hindu mage of the late 19th and early 20th centuries. Blavatsky was particularly charmed by Crawford's Ram Lal, a character akin to Bulwer-Lytton's Mejnour or Koot Hoomi of the Theosophists. Ram Lal says of himself: "I am not omnipotent. I have very little more power than you. Given certain conditions I can produce certain results, palpable, visible, and appreciable by all; but my power, as you know, is itself merely the knowledge of the laws of nature, which Western scientists, in their ignorance, ignore." According to EF, this book informs readers about some of the teachings of Theosophy.

Rosa Campbell Praed was interested in spiritualism, occultism, and Theosophy, and made the acquaintance of many Theosophists who, as French pointed out, "inevitably became characters in her novels". He wrote: "Praed was especially influenced by her meeting in 1885 with Mohini Chatterji (who became the model for Ananda in The Brother of the Shadow)." (Note: According to EF, Blavatsky's ideas "provide the basis for the brief but wholehearted Theosophical fantasy" The Brother of the Shadow (1886) by Mrs Praed.)

French wrote that figures of the Theosophical mahatmas appear in several of the most popular novels of Marie Corelli, including her first book The Romance of Two Worlds (1886). A similar theme is present in A Fallen Idol (1886) by F. Anstey.

According to EOP, the author of occult novels Algernon Blackwood specialized in literature describing psychic phenomena and ghosts. In their article "Theosophy and Popular Fiction", the esotericism researchers Gilhus and Mikaelsson point out that in his novel The Human Chord (1910), Blackwood warns readers about the dangers of occult experiments.

Gustav Meyrink's novel The Golem (1914) is mentioned by many researchers of esotericism. Writer Talbot Mundy created his works on the basis of the Theosophical assumption that various forms of occultism exist as evidence of the ancient wisdom that is preserved at the present time, thanks to the secret brotherhood of adepts.

== Characters whose prototype was Blavatsky ==
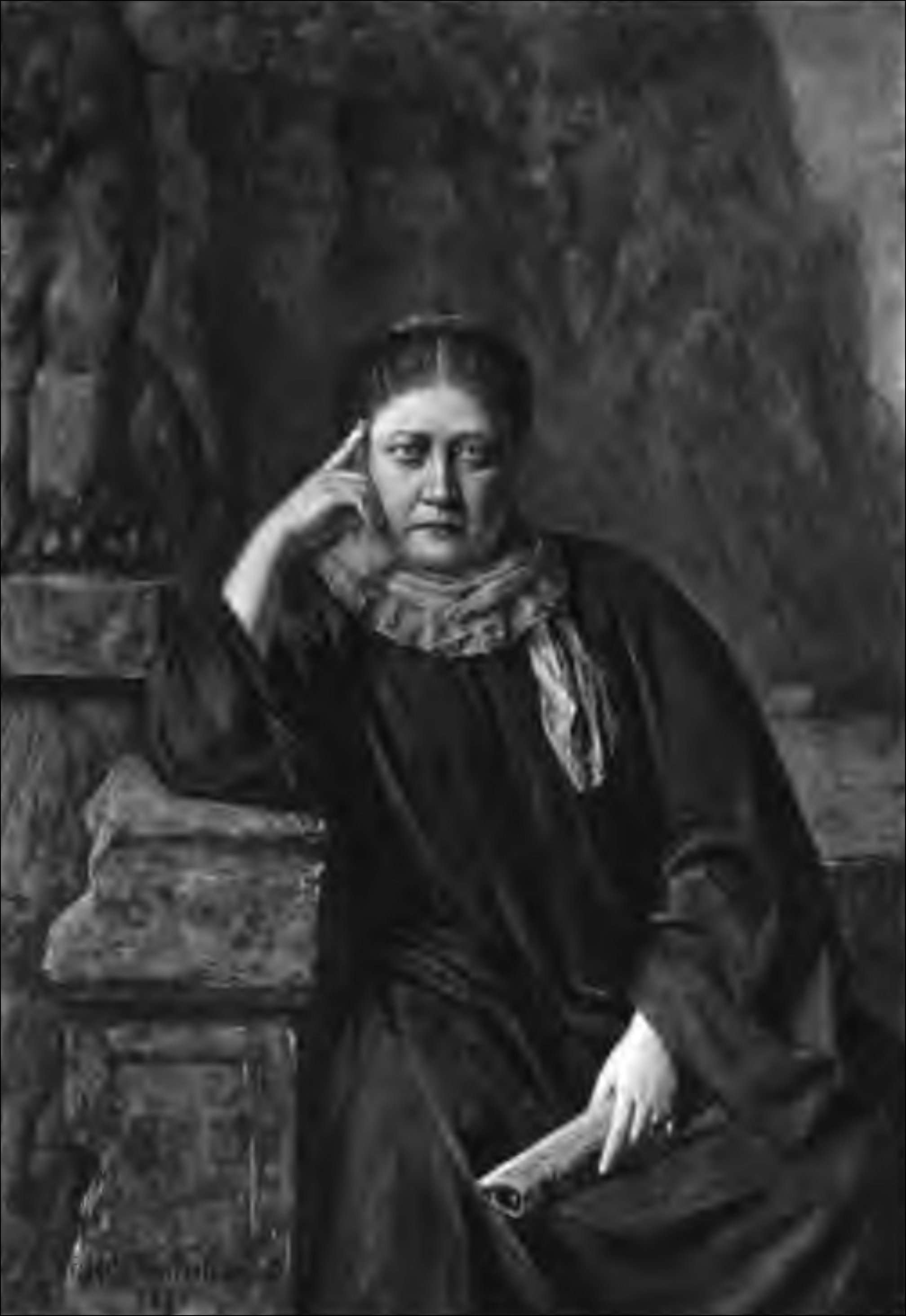
Mme Blavatsky by H. Schmiechen

- Mme Tamvaco in a novel by Rosa Campbell Praed Affinities
- Image of Urur in a novel by Franz Hartmann The Talking Image of Urur
- Maya in the story of the same name by Vera Zhelikhovsky (Note: See the comments for the 2017 reprint.)
- Mme Petrovna in a novel by William Lincoln Garver Brother of the Third Degree (Note: "Garver's portrait of Madame Petrovna is a clear literary replica of Blavatsky.")
- Mme Sosostris in a poem by T. S. Eliot The Waste Land
- Helena Petrovna Blavatsky in a novel by Mark Frost The List of 7
- Natalia Vladimirovna Andreyeva in a novel by Concordia Antarova Two Lives

== Bibliography ==
- Allen, F. M. (1886). A House of Tears.
- Anstey, F. (1886). A Fallen Idol.
- Blackwood, A. (1910). The Human Chord.
- Blavatsky, H. P. (1889). The Voice of the Silence (PDF).
- ———— (1892). Nightmare Tales.
- Britten, E. H. (1876). Ghost Land, or Researches into the Mysteries of Occultism (PDF).
- Collins, M. (1889). The Blossom and the Fruit: A True Story of a Black Magician. New York, J.W. Lovell company.
- ———— (1892). Morial the Mahatma, or The Black Master of Tibet.
- Corelli, M. (1886). A Romance of Two Worlds. ()
- Crawford, F. M. (1882). Mr Isaacs. New York, Collier.
- ———— (1885). Zoroaster.
- Dostoevsky, F. (1880). The Grand Inquisitor. Translated by H. Blavatsky.
- Eliot, T. S. (1922). The Waste Land.
- Flammarion, C. (1889). Urania. Translated by Augusta R. Stetson. (Note: A French astronomer and writer Camille Flammarion was a member of the Theosophical Society.)
- ———— (1892). Lumen.
- ———— (1894). Omega: The Last Days of the World.
- Frost, M. (1993). The List of 7.
- Garver, W. L. (1894). Brother of the Third Degree (PDF).
- Haggard, H. R. (1885). King Solomon's Mines.
- ———— (1887). She: A History of Adventure.
- Hartmann, F. (1887). An Adventure among the Rosicrucians. Occult Pub. Co.
- ———— (1890). The Talking Image of Urur.
- ———— (1895). Among the Gnomes.
- Judge, W. Q. (1893). Occult Tales.
- Kingsford, A. (1875). Rosamunda the Princess, and Other Tales.
- Leadbeater, C. W. (1911). The Perfume of Egypt and other Weird Stories.
- Lytton, B. (1842). Zanoni.
- ———— (1871). The Coming Race.
- Marryat, F. (1887). A Daughter of the Tropics.
- Meyrink, G. (1914). Der Golem [The Golem] (in German).
- Mundy, T. (1924). Om: The Secret of Ahbor Valley.
- Praed, R. C. (1885). Affinities. G. Routledge and Sons.
- ———— (1886). The Brother of the Shadow. Arno Press. ISBN 9780405081620.
- ———— (1902). The Insane Root: A Romance of a Strange Country.
- Scott, C. M. (1920). The Initiate. (1st part)
- ———— (1953). The Boy Who Saw True. Random House. ISBN 9781446489161.
- Sinnett, A. P. (1885). Karma: A Novel.
- ———— (1886a). United, Vol. 1.
- ———— (1886b). United, Vol. 2.
- Stevenson, R. L. (1886). The Strange Case of Dr Jekyll and Mr Hyde.
- Tolstoy, L. N. (1889). How A Devil's Imp Redeemed His Loaf, or The First Distiller. Translated by H. Blavatsky.
- Yeats, W. B. (1889). Irish Fairies, Ghosts, Witches, etc.
- ———— (1914). Witches and Wizards and Irish Folk-Lore.
- ———— (1929). Mohini Chatterjee.

In Russian

- Достоевский, Ф. М. Великий инквизитор [The Grand Inquisitor] (in Russian). (1980)
- Желиховская, В. П. Майя [Maya] (in Russian). (1893)
- Толстой, Л. Н. Как чертёнок краюшку выкупал [How A Devil's Imp Redeemed His Loaf] (in Russian). (1886)
- ————. О жизни [On Life] (in Russian). (1886–1887)
- ————. Мысли мудрых людей на каждый день [The Thoughts of Wise People for Every Day] (in Russian). (1903)

== See also ==
- From the Caves and Jungles of Hindostan
- Theosophy and visual arts
- Obadiah Archer from Valiant Comics
- Western esotericism and the arts
