= Ernest Maltravers =

Ernest Maltravers may refer to:

- Ernest Maltravers (novel), an 1837 novel by Edward Bulwer-Lytton
- Ernest Maltravers (play), an 1838 American stage adaptation by Louisa Medina
- Ernest Maltravers (1914 film), an American film adaptation
- Ernest Maltravers (1920 film), a British film adaptation directed by Jack Denton
