= Square peg in a round hole =

Idiom originated by Sydney Smith, used to refer to individualist nonconformity

"Square peg in a round hole" is an idiomatic expression which describes the unusual individualist who could not fit into a niche of their society.

The metaphor was originated by Sydney Smith in "On the Conduct of the Understanding", one of a series of lectures on moral philosophy that he delivered at the Royal Institution in 1804–06:

If you choose to represent the various parts in life by holes upon a table, of different shapes,—some circular, some triangular, some square, some oblong,—and the person acting these parts by bits of wood of similar shapes, we shall generally find that the triangular person has got into the square hole, the oblong into the triangular, and a square person has squeezed himself into the round hole. The officer and the office, the doer and the thing done, seldom fit so exactly, that we can say they were almost made for each other.

The Oxford English Dictionary has as its earliest citation Albany Fonblanque, England under Seven Administrations, 1837, "Sir Robert Peel was a smooth round peg, in a sharp-cornered square hole, and Lord Lyndenurst [John Copley, 1st Baron Lyndhurst] is a rectangular square-cut peg, in a smooth round hole."

== Uses in literature ==
The British novelist Edward Bulwer-Lytton published the metaphor in a late 19th-century book Kenelm Chillingly:

Kenelm Chillingly asks, "Does it not prove that no man, however wise, is a good judge of his own case? Now, your son's case is really your case —- you see it through the medium of your likings and dislikings, and insist upon forcing a square peg into a round hole, because in a round hole you, being a round peg, feel tight and comfortable. Now I call that irrational."

The farmer responded, "I don't see why my son has any right to fancy himself a square peg ... when his father, and his grandfather, and his great-grandfather, have been round pegs; and it is agin' nature for any creature not to take after its own kind."

— Edward Bulwer-Lytton, Kenelm Chillingly, His Adventures and Opinions

== Music ==
"A Square Peg in a Round Hole" is the title song of the 1959 British war comedy film The Square Peg starring Norman Wisdom. The phrase is also used as the title of an album by Apparatjik.

Godley and Creme in their title "Wedding Bells" (1981) are singing: "I'm like a square peg in a round hole I don't belong here baby don't need a fanfare or a drum roll to tell you baby I don't belong to you baby"

== Contemporary examples ==
This idiomatic expression has proven to be quite durable into the 21st century. It is used in a range of contemporary circumstances, especially in business and public life. Illustrative examples include:

- "We intend to show that Israel needs a security process as well as a peace process.... To continue with the old diplomatic approach would be like hammering square pegs into round holes." -- Dore Gold
- "As they say, you can't fit a square peg in a round hole. If your boss is like that round hole and you are that square peg, you aren't going to fit in unless you re-shape your edges." -- Gini Graham Scott in A Survival Guide for Working with Bad Bosses: Dealing with Bullies, Idiots, Back-stabbers, and Other Managersfrom Hell (2005).
- "... relating back to the title of the panel session, square peg in a round hole; well, maybe, but sometimes you can force that peg in and make it stick. We seem to be somewhere between a feeling of cautious optimism and open-minded skepticism about the workability of disease management in fee-for-service Medicare. -- Bruce Steinwald, Director of Economics and Payment Issues in the Health Division at the U.S. General Accounting Office

== Similar expressions in other languages ==
Sejong the Great of Korea commented, in 1443, that using Chinese characters for Korean was “like trying to fit a square handle into a round hole”. He subsequently developed the Hangul phonetic alphabet.

There is a Chinese idiom "方枘圆凿", or "方凿圆枘", (literally and respectively "square tenon and round mortise" and "square mortise and round tenon") that was originally derived from a line in the Verses of Chu (Chu ci) 楚辭), composed in the Warring States period (ended 221 BC), in which the poet Song Yu writes: "圆凿而方枘兮，吾固知其龃龉而难入。" The Han Dynasty historian Sima Qian and Tang Dynasty historian 司馬貞 used the same expression in their historical writings too. It is still widely used today to mean two things that don't fit together due to different qualities, characters or abilities.

== Literal cases ==
- Dutch settlers in northeastern North America sometimes actually pounded square-cut pegs into round holes when building in the 1800s.
- A common method of securing the steel rail of railway track into timber sleepers is to drive a square-cut dogspike into a pre-drilled round hole.
- During the Apollo 13 space mission, an oxygen tank explosion left the Command Module Odyssey uninhabitable. The crew evacuated into the Lunar Module Aquarius, using it as a lifeboat for the rest of the trip to the Moon and back to Earth. Among the problems they had to solve was that the carbon dioxide scrubbers were being used up too quickly, being designed for the requirements of two astronauts for 1 1/2 days, not three astronauts for four days. There were unused canisters in the command module, but those were cube-shaped and large, not cylindrical and small as in the lunar module. Ground Control put together a team with the objective to find a way to use only items available on the spacecraft to build something to make the control module canisters usable. Using plastic sample bags and cardboard from the log books covers as a funnel, the cabin air was pumped through the lithium hydroxide using a pressure suit hose, into a fan and then through a sock, which acted as the filter. The whole thing was held together with duct tape.

== See also ==
- Joseph Powell Williams
- List of English-language idioms
- Procrustean
