= Burjorji Padshah =

Indian educationist (1864–1941)

Burjorji Jamaspji Padshah
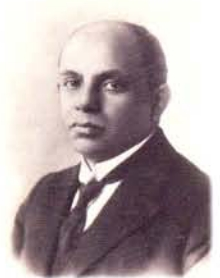
- Burjorji J. Padshah
- Born: 7 May 1864; Bombay, British India
- Died: 20 June 1941 (aged 77)
- Occupations: Educationist, scholar
- Known for: Contributions to Tata Industrial Group, Indian Institute of Science, industrial and scientific education in India
- Notable work: An Institute of Scientific Research for India (1898)

Burjorji Jamaspji Padshah (7 May 1864 - 20 June 1941) was a Parsi educationist and scholar who was involved in the establishment of several institutions while working with Jamsetji Tata and later his sons Dorab and Ratan Tata. These included the Tata Iron and Steel plant, the Indian Institute of Science, New India Assurance and Tata Oil Mills. He was also for sometime a Theosophist.

== Life and work ==
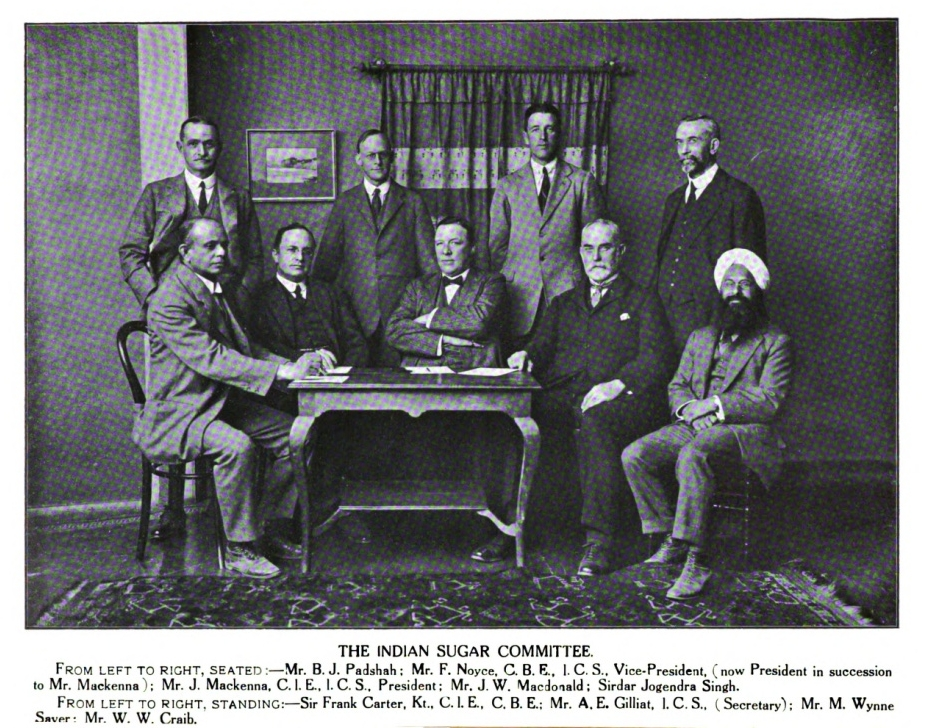
Padshah in the Sugar Committee of 1920

Padshah was born in Bombay, the fourth son of Jamaspji Padshah (d. 1880) from Navsari, a close friend of Jamsetji Tata who ran several business including a horse stable at Byculla. Tata's daughter Dhunbai was even expected to marry Padshah but she died in 1871. After the death of his father in 1880, Padshah took over charge of the family business. He graduated from Elphinstone College in 1884 with a Cobden Medal in Political Economy. Not aspiring to follow a career in the civil services as sought by his mother, he took an interest in theosophy, joining the movement in 1883. He travelled to Europe with Mohini Mohun Chatterji and Krishnamachari (Babaji) for study with Madame Blavatsky but gave up theosophy after the publication of the Hodgson Report. He then studied mathematics at Cambridge and economics under Henry Sidgwick. Padshah returned to India and became a vice-principal at the Sindh Arts College. A promotion was however denied as an Englishman was favoured. He was then offered a manager position at the Swadeshi Mill founded by Jamsetji Tata. He declined the offer and revealed to Tata the sympathies he had for the mill workers and their strikes. Tata then began to have regular discussions with him on various matters of education. Tata sponsored and sent him on a world tour in 1896 to examine research institutions so as to establish an Indian University of Research. This also involved industrial aims like the manufacture of steel. This resulted in a pamphlet An Institute of Scientific Research for India (1898). Padshah corresponded widely with contemporary thinkers and leaders.

Padshah was involved in the establishment of Tata's iron and steel plant which required specially trained people. Tata initially had scholarships for Indian students to train abroad but this was followed by the establishment of the Indian Institute of Science in Bangalore. He however clashed in his visions with the ideas of the first director Morris Travers. He was also involved in establishing Tata's vision for industrial training and believed that the main industries to focus on where metallurgy, chemical, electrical power, mining, civil engineering, medicine and pharmacy, paper and brick making. He worked on the establishment of a technical institute with imperial approval at Sakchi which was renamed as Jamshedpur in February 1919 by Lord Chelmsford. He also assisted Haffkine in his work on vaccines in Bombay.

Padshah left the Tata group in 1931 and travelled around the world. He was a friend of Mahatma Gandhi, and was a vegetarian who refused to wear leather and was involved in animal rights activism.
