= The Pilgrims of the Rhine =

1834 novel

- Author: Edward Bulwer-Lytton
- Language: English
- Genre: Romanticism
- Publisher: Saunders and Otley
- Publication date: 1834
- Publication place: United Kingdom
- Media type: Print

The Pilgrims of the Rhine is an 1834 novella by the British writer Edward Bulwer-Lytton. Set in the Rhineland, it reflects Bulwer-Lytton's interest in Germany and the romantic movement. The book's structure of linked stories has drawn comparisons with later anthology films such as Ealing Studios' Dead of Night. Bulwer-Lytton had made his name with his 1828 novel Pelham which was extremely in late Regency Britain. He continued with similar silver fork novels but also branched out increasingly to more expressive works, a number with historical settings.

== Bibliography ==
- Colbert, Benjamin & Morrison, Lucy (ed.) Continental Tourism, Travel Writing, and the Consumption of Culture, 1814–1900. Springer Nature, 2020.
- Huckvale, David. A Dark and Stormy Oeuvre: Crime, Magic and Power in the Novels of Edward Bulwer-Lytton. McFarland, 2015.
