= Falkland (novel) =

1827 novel

- Author: Edward Bulwer-Lytton
- Language: English
- Genre: Gothic romance
- Publisher: Henry Colburn
- Publication date: 1827
- Publication place: United Kingdom
- Media type: Print

Falkland is an 1827 Gothic novella by the British writer Edward Bulwer-Lytton. It was his first published novel and took inspiration from Johann Wolfgang von Goethe's The Sorrows of Young Werther. The protagonist was likely partly based on Bulwer-Lytton himself. The novel enjoyed success in Germany, but was criticised in Britain as immoral. It was followed by Pelham in 1828, in which he switched to the fashionable silver fork genre, which established him as a leading writer in Britain and Europe.

== Synopsis ==
Falkland, a young English gentleman, falls in love with Emily Mandeville, a married woman. To his horror he has a premonition of her death.

== Bibliography ==
- Adburgham, Alison. Silver Fork Society: Fashionable Life and Literature from 1814 to 1840. Faber & Faber, 2012.
- Huckvale, David. A Dark and Stormy Oeuvre: Crime, Magic and Power in the Novels of Edward Bulwer-Lytton. McFarland, 2015.
- Mulvey-Roberts, Marie. The Handbook of the Gothic. Springer, 2016.
- Wilson, Cheryl A. Fashioning the Silver Fork Novel. Routledge, 6 Oct 2015.
