= Devereux (novel) =

1829 novel

- Author: Edward Bulwer-Lytton
- Language: English
- Genre: Historical drama
- Publisher: Henry Colburn
- Publication date: 1829
- Publication place: United Kingdom
- Media type: Print

Devereux is an 1829 historical novel by the British writer Edward Bulwer-Lytton, published in three volumes. He earned £1,500 for the novel from his publisher Henry Colburn, trebling his earnings from the successful silver fork novel Pelham of the previous year. He dedicated it to his friend the Canadian traveller and writer John Auldjo, then living in Naples.

== Plot ==
The novel takes place during the reign of Queen Anne and partly revolves around a secret Jacobite plot to place the pretender James Stuart on the throne. The story of a sibling rivalry between three brothers may have been influenced by Bulwer-Lytton's own upbringing.

== Bibliography ==
- Copeland, Edward. The Silver Fork Novel: Fashionable Fiction in the Age of Reform. Cambridge University Press, 2012.
- Huckvale, David. A Dark and Stormy Oeuvre: Crime, Magic and Power in the Novels of Edward Bulwer-Lytton. McFarland, 2015.
