= Square Pegs (disambiguation) =

Square Peg or Square Pegs may refer to:

- Square Pegs, a 1982–1983 American TV series
  - "Square Pegs" (song), a 1982 song by The Waitresses that served as the TV show's theme song
- Square Pegs (Hong Kong TV series), a 2003 Hong Kong TV series
- "Square peg in a round hole", an idiomatic expression
- The Square Peg, a 1958 British comedy film
- "Square Peg" (King of the Hill), a 1997 television episode
- Square Peg (production company), an American production company founded by filmmaker Ari Aster and producer Lars Knudsen
