= A Blighted Life =

1880 book by Rosina Bulwer Lytton

- Author: Rosina Bulwer Lytton
- Language: English
- Genre: Memoir
- Publisher: London Publishing Office
- Publication date: 1880
- Pages: 132
- ISBN: 1-85506-248-8
- OCLC: 30950164

A Blighted Life is an 1880 book by Rosina Bulwer Lytton chronicling the events surrounding her incarceration in a Victorian madhouse by her husband Edward Bulwer-Lytton, 1st Baron Lytton and her subsequent release a few weeks later. This was at a time when men could lock up socially inconvenient female relatives in psychiatric institutions.
