= Cowley Wright =

English actor

Cowley Wright (6 October 1889 – 18 January 1923) was an English actor.

In 1910 he played the Bishop of Illyria in The Prince and the Beggar Maid at the Lyceum Theatre in London.

Wright was born in Anerley, London, England and died at age 33 in London.

== Filmography ==
- The Rocks of Valpre (1919)
- The Channings (1920)
- Ernest Maltravers (1920)
- Sybil (1921)
