= Sybil (1921 film) =

1921 film by Jack Denton

- Directed by: Jack Denton
- Written by: Benjamin Disraeli (novel); Colden Lore
- Starring: Evelyn Brent; Cowley Wright; Gordon Hopkirk; Harry Gilbey
- Production company: Ideal Film Company
- Distributed by: Ideal Film Company
- Release date: 1921
- Running time: Five reels
- Country: United Kingdom
- Language: Silent

Sybil is a 1921 British silent drama film directed by Jack Denton and starring Evelyn Brent, Cowley Wright and Gordon Hopkirk. It is an adaptation of the 1845 novel Sybil by Benjamin Disraeli. It is considered to be a lost film.

== Cast ==
- Evelyn Brent - Sybil Gerard
- Cowley Wright - Honorable Charles Egremont
- Gordon Hopkirk - Stephen Hatton
- Harry Gilbey - James Hatton
- Philip D. Williams - James Marney
- William Burchill - Father
