= Ernest Maltravers (1920 film) =

1920 film

- Directed by: Jack Denton
- Written by: Eliot Stannard
- Based on: Ernest Maltravers by Edward Bulwer-Lytton
- Starring: Cowley Wright; Lillian Hall-Davis; Gordon Hopkirk; Norman Partridge
- Production company: Ideal Film Company
- Distributed by: Ideal Film Company
- Release date: 1920
- Country: United Kingdom
- Language: English

Ernest Maltravers is a 1920 British silent drama film directed by Jack Denton and starring Cowley Wright, Lillian Hall-Davis and Gordon Hopkirk. It is an adaptation of the 1837 novel Ernest Maltravers by Edward Bulwer-Lytton which had previously been made into an American film Ernest Maltravers in 1914.

== Cast ==
- Cowley Wright as Ernest Maltravers
- Lillian Hall-Davis as Alice Darvil
- Gordon Hopkirk as George Legard
- Norman Partridge as Luke Darvil
- George Bellamy as Mr Merton
- Florence Nelson as Mrs Merton
- Ernest A. Douglas as Lord Vargrave
- Stella Wood-Sims as Evelyn
- N. Watt-Phillips as Waters
