= A Strange Story =

1862 novel

- Author: Edward Bulwer-Lytton
- Language: English
- Genre: Gothic novel
- Publisher: Sampson Low
- Publication date: 1862
- Publication place: United Kingdom
- Media type: Print

A Strange Story is an 1862 Gothic novel by the British writer Edward Bulwer-Lytton. It was originally serialised in the magazine All the Year Round edited by Charles Dickens. It was then published in two volumes by the London publishing house Sampson Low. The American release was handled by Harper and Brothers of New York. The novel reflects Bulwer-Lytton's interest in themes of the occult and mesmerism.

== Bibliography ==
- Mathieu, Joachim. Edward Bulwer-Lytton's England and the English. Kovač, 2001.
- Mitchell, Leslie George. Bulwer Lytton: The Rise and Fall of a Victorian Man of Letters. Hambledon and London, 2003.
- Thomson, Douglass H., Frank, Frederick S. & Voller, Jack G. (ed.) Gothic Writers: A Critical and Bibliographical Guide. Bloomsbury Publishing, 2001.
