= Almighty dollar =

Idiom based on the religiosity of capital and/or money

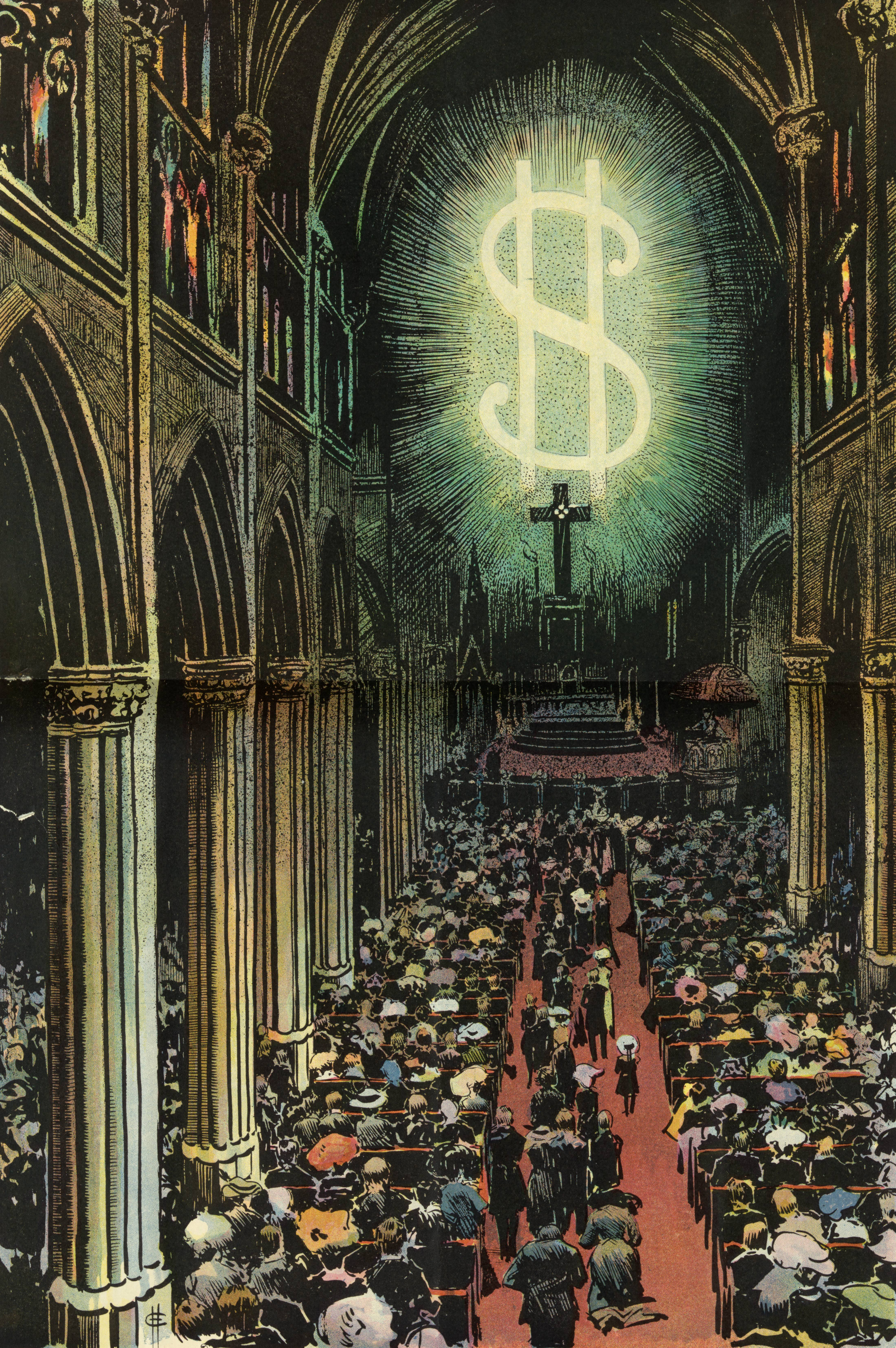
The Almightier, showing a large dollar sign in place of the rose window in a cathedral; 1907 illustration from Puck

"Almighty dollar" is an idiom often used to satirize obsession with material wealth, or with capitalism in general. The phrase implies that money is a kind of deity.

== History ==
Although the phrase "almighty dollar" was not popularized until the 1900s, similar phrases had been used much earlier. For example, the British writer Ben Jonson wrote in 1616:

Whilst that for which all virtue now is sold,
And almost every vice, almighty gold.

The "dollar" version of the phrase is commonly attributed to Washington Irving, who used it in the story "The Creole Village," first published in the 1837 edition of The Magnolia, a literary annual: (Note: The story was also reprinted in its entirety in the November 1836 issue of The Knickerbocker magazine within a review of The Magnolia.)

The almighty dollar, that great object of universal devotion throughout our land, seems to have no genuine devotees in these peculiar villages; and unless some of its missionaries penetrate there, and erect banking houses and other pious shrines, there is no knowing how long the inhabitants may remain in their present state of contented poverty.

Charles Dickens used the phrase in Chapter III, "Boston", of his American Notes, published in 1842.

Edward Bulwer-Lytton is often credited with coining the related phrase "pursuit of the almighty dollar", which he used in his 1871 novel The Coming Race. More obscure uses of the phrase can be found as far back as 1852.

== In popular culture ==
"The Almighty Dollar" is the name of a 2007 Ozzy Osbourne song from his album Black Rain. The song argues that money and greed are destroying the planet by blinding people to problems such as global warming and pollution.

"Almighty Dollar" is the name of a Devin the Dude song from his 2007 album Waitin' to Inhale. It is a lament both of a marijuana user's lack of money and the declining buying power of the US dollar.

The words "Almighty Dollar" are repeated in the 1973 funk hit single "For the Love of Money" by The O'Jays. The song cautions against the intense desire for money and the negative effects that such desire can have on a person's personality and actions.

The phrase "Almighty Dollar" is repeated many times in the song "Money (In God We Trust)" by the funk metal band Extreme.

== See also ==
- Prosperity theology
