= Louisa Medina =

American playwright, literary figure

Louisa Medina (c.1813–1838), also known as Louisa Honore de Medina, Louisa Medina Hamblin, and the nickname Louisine, was a playwright and literary figure in New York City between the years 1833 and her death. She wrote poems, short stories, and approximately 34 melodramas of which only 11 remain extant. She is mostly known for adapting dramatic versions of Edward Bulwer-Lytton's Last Days of Pompeii (1835) and Ernest Maltravers (1838), and Robert Montgomery Bird's Nick of the Woods (1838), among others. In an era when successful plays typically ran 3-4 nights, Last Days of Pompeii set a record by running for twenty-nine days. This was the earliest known example of a "long run" for a play, a technique which became regularly used by Thomas Hamblin. Medina is also accredited as the first women in American Theatre to earn her living exclusively as a dramatist. Louisa Medina's progressive inclinations concerning her education and self-reliance marks her as an indicator of the rise of First-Wave Feminism in America.

== Early life and education ==
Few details are known about Medina's early life, but she spent most of her life in Europe. According to an interview she gave to the Spirit of the Times, her father was a Spanish shipping magnate whose business went bankrupt, leaving her in the charge of distant relatives. Although the unknown relatives were indifferent to her education, Medina pursued "the bold, masculine studies usually adopted by the male rather than the female gender." She reportedly learned Greek, Latin, French, Spanish, and English by the time she was a teenager. She began writing for London annuals at the age of twelve, from which point she began traveling throughout Europe.

At the age of 19, Medina emigrated to the United States, arriving in Philadelphia on the passenger ship Thames in 1831. Upon arriving, she went to New York, where tutored French and Spanish while writing stories for local publications. She became the governess of Bowery Theatre manager Thomas S. Hamblin's children, and, ultimately, the Bowery's chief playwright and Hamblin's partner. It is speculated that Medina and Hamblin entered a relationship prior to Hamblin's divorce with his last wife.

== Works ==
While Medina's plays were wildly successful, she drew nearly universal admiration from her peers and the press. Theatrical manager and actor Lester Wallack wrote in his memoirs that Medina "was one of the most brilliant women I have ever met." An article in the New York Mirror praises 'the fertility of her invention–which is one of the highest attributes of true genius.'

Many of Medina's plays were presumably lost in the numerous fires that destroyed the Bowery. Besides the plays mentioned above, she also write the early horror story 'Burial by Fire' (1838), 'Panorama of Life' (1838), and composed the dedicatory address at the re-opening of the Bowery in 1837 after a fire. At least one story, 'Chess Play' (1843) seems to have been published posthumously.

Medina's association with Hamblin made her the chief dramatist of the Bowery Theatre in 1833, and one of the most successful dramatists of the day. In his first spell as Bowery manager, Hamblin accrued heavy debt, which threatened to drive the theatre into ruin. Medina's plays, especially Last Days of Pompeii is credited with saving the Bowery.

Medina's plays, almost always adapted from novels, blended romantic melodrama and spectacle. According to one source, 'she is partial to startling and terrible catastrophe.' The Last Days of Pompeii included the spectacle of an erupting volcano on stage and Nick of the Woods had two characters ride a flaming canoe over a waterfall.

== Controversy and death ==
In 1838, Hamblin took on eighteen-year-old ingenue Louisa Missouri Miller to star in Medina's Ernest Maltravers. Miller was the half-sister of Josephine Clifton, an actress who had previously worked for Hamblin (and probably been his mistress for a short period). After Miller earned a resounding success in her role, her mother, a notorious brothel owner, tried to take Miller from Hamblin's influence, which resulted in Hamblin arranging for Miller to be his ward. Miller went on to live with Hamblin and Medina amidst rumour that she was Hamblin's mistress.

Shortly after this affair, Miller suddenly died of "brain fever," with many people suspecting Medina of poisoning her rival.

Medina would die a few months later from mysterious causes in the home that she shared with Hamblin. Although some accused Hamblin of poisoning her, the coroner's inquest found that the case of her death was apoplexy.

After her death, Medina's plays were revived almost yearly, with Nick of the Woods appearing as late as 1882.
