= The Disowned =

1828 novel

- Author: Edward Bulwer-Lytton
- Language: English
- Genre: Silver Fork
- Publisher: Henry Colburn
- Publication date: 1828–1829
- Publication place: United Kingdom
- Media type: Print

The Disowned is a novel by the British writer Edward Bulwer-Lytton, originally published in three volumes. It is part of the then-popular genre of silver fork novels, focusing on British high society of the late Regency era. Like many other silver fork novels it was published by Henry Colburn, with the first volume coming out in 1828 and the latter two in 1829. It is set in the late eighteenth century but the political and social themes it refers to have more relevance to the contemporary 1820s.

== Synopsis ==
The plot follows two separate protagonists who are disowned by their upper class families. Algernon Mordaunt is disinherited by his family after marrying the penniless orphan Isabel St Leger and never recovers from the separation. By contrast Clarence Linden, from an aristocratic background, manages to carve a life for himself among the middle classes of London and eventually marries an heiress.

== Bibliography ==
- Adburgham, Alison. Silver Fork Society: Fashionable Life and Literature from 1814 to 1840. Faber & Faber, 2012.
- Copeland, Edward. The Silver Fork Novel: Fashionable Fiction in the Age of Reform. Cambridge University Press, 2012.
- Rosa, Matthew Whiting. The Silver-fork School: Novels of Fashion Preceding Vanity Fair. Columbia University Press, 1936.
