= Zanoni =

1842 novel by Edward Bulwer-Lytton

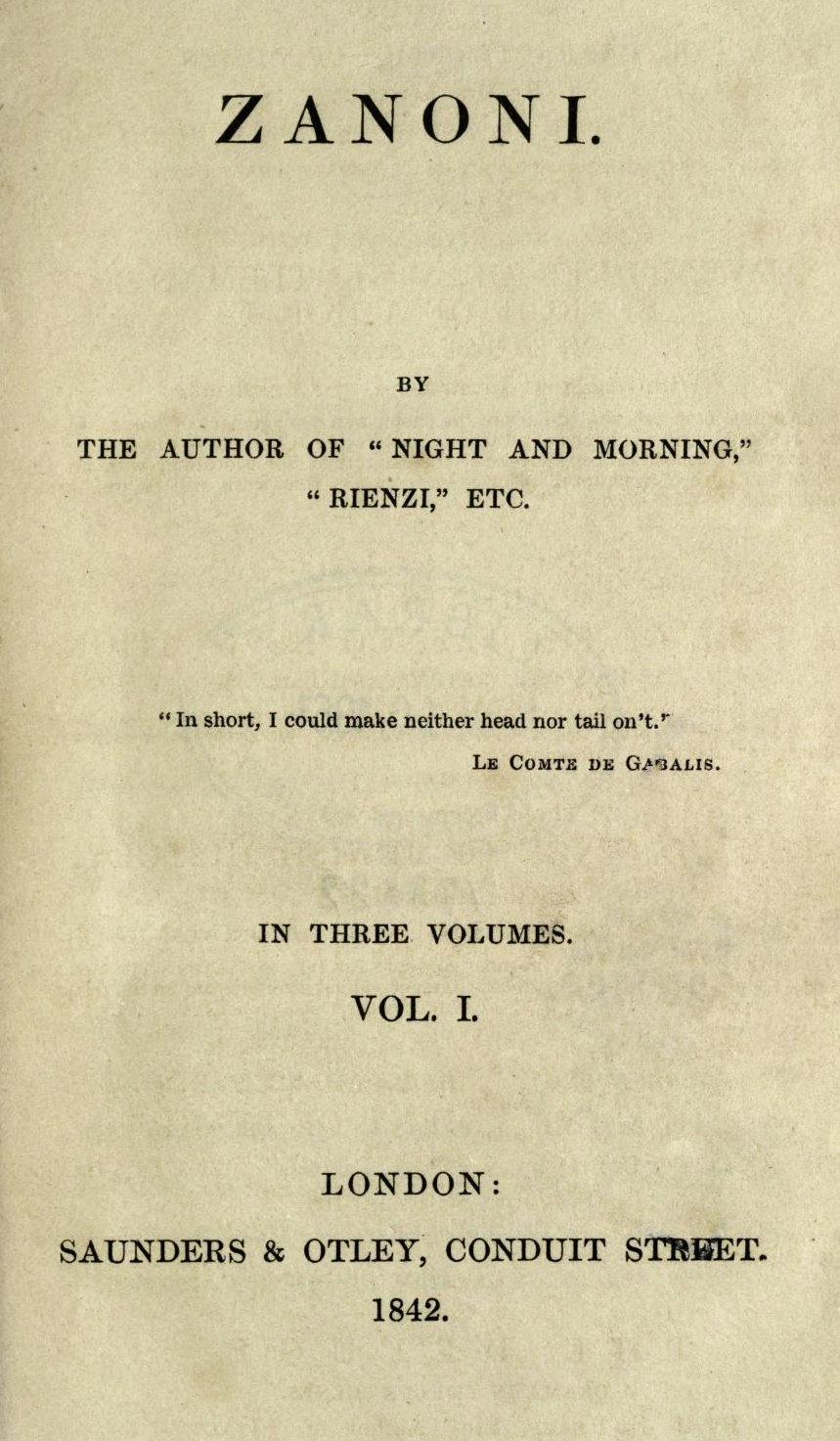
- First edition title page
- Author: Edward Bulwer-Lytton
- Language: English
- Genre: Fiction novel
- Published: 1842
- Publisher: Saunders and Otley
- Publication place: England
- Media type: Print
- Preceded by: Leila: or The Siege of Granada
- Followed by: The Last of the Barons

Zanoni is an 1842 novel by Edward Bulwer-Lytton, a story of love and occult aspiration. By way of framing device, the author says: "... It so chanced that some years ago, in my younger days, whether of authorship or life, I felt the desire to make myself acquainted with the true origins and tenets of the singular sect known by the name of Rosicrucians." A manuscript came into his hands written in what Bulwer-Lytton described as an "unintelligible cipher", a manuscript which through the author's own interpretation became Zanoni.

It tells the story of its protagonist Zanoni, who possesses occult powers and knows the secret of eternal life.

== Characters ==
The principal characters are:

- Zanoni – an initiate into Chaldean wisdom
- Mejnour – an older companion and fellow initiate
- Clarence Glyndon – an English artist who aspires to the secret knowledge
- Viola Pisani – a beautiful and purehearted but unsophisticated Neapolitan
- Mervale – a commonsensical and conventional-minded friend of Glyndon
- Nicot – a debased and selfish revolutionary

== Plot summary ==
Zanoni has lived since the Chaldean civilisation. He is a Rosicrucian brother and cannot fall in love without losing his power of immortality. However, he falls in love with Viola Pisani, a promising young opera singer from Naples, who is the daughter of Pisani, an Italian violinist. An English gentleman named Glyndon loves Viola as well, but is indecisive about proposing marriage and then renounces his love to pursue occult study. The story develops in 1789, during the French Revolution.

His master Mejnour warns him against a love affair but Zanoni does not heed. He finally marries Viola and they have a child. As Zanoni experiences an increase in humanity, he begins to lose his gift of immortality. He finally dies by the guillotine during the French Revolution.

== Theme ==
Bulwer-Lytton humanised Gothic art and evoked its poetry to suit the Victorian era. In Zanoni, Bulwer-Lytton alludes to deep Rosicrucian mysteries regarding the four elements, secrets that only initiated Rosicrucians have the power to reveal and which enable them to attain the ultimate goal: the discovery of the Elixir of life and the attainment of immortality and eternal youth. This is all depicted in Zanoni himself who at the time of Babylon abandoned all human passions to become immortal but during the French Revolution, became human again as he fell in love, eventually leading to his death at the guillotine.

The name Zanoni is derived from the Chaldean root zan, meaning "sun", and the chief character is endowed with solar attributes.

== Argument ==
From the viewpoint of Platonism and Neo-Platonism, Zanoni evokes the themes of the four types of divine madness covered in Plato's Phaedrus: These are prophetic, initiatic, poetic and erotic madness. These four threads are interwoven through the entire fabric of the work, creating an atmosphere of divine madness. Even Zanoni's attempt to become human again becomes an apotheosis with his ultimate sacrifice.

== Reputation among later occultists ==
Occult author C. Nelson Stewart praised Bulwer-Lytton, describing him as well-versed in Rosicrucian and occult lore and lauding the way in which he had brought it to bear on his novel Zanoni. Nelson Stewart also opined that Bulwer-Lytton had demonstrated a profound knowledge of astrology by making a prediction about the fate of Disraeli: "... He will die, whether in or out of office, in an exceptionally high position, greatly lamented, and surrounded to the end by all the magnificent planetary influences of a propitious Jupiter."

== Influence ==
It is Zanoni's ultimate sacrifice that would give Bulwer-Lytton's friend Charles Dickens an idea on how to end A Tale of Two Cities.

Zanoni was adapted into a Gujarati novel, Gulabsinh (1897), by Indian writer Manilal Dwivedi.

Zanoni is referenced in The Transit of Venus by Shirley Hazzard: "A book beside his chair was closed on a pencil that marked a place. He took it up and read the spine: Zanoni. A Novel by the Right Honourable Lord Lytton. Such a book might well have appeared on the shelves of such a room. That it should be out, open, and read was more improbable".

When David Bowie made a list of 100 books that had changed his life, he included Zanoni.

== Guardian of the Threshold ==
Speaking to Glyndon, Mejnour says of the Guardian, "... Know, at least, that all of us – the highest and the wisest – who have, in sober truth, passed beyond the threshold, have had, as our first fearful task, to master and subdue its grisly and appalling guardian."

According to the German Anthroposophist Rudolf Steiner, the Guardian of the Threshold is an actual figure of an astral nature which was fictionalised by Bulwer-Lytton in this novel.

Samael Aun Weor refers to Adonai as Zanoni's real Master and to the Guardian of the Threshold as the psychological "I" or reincarnating ego.

== See also ==
- Zanoni and Theosophy
