= Godolphin (novel) =

1833 book by Edward Bulwer-Lytton

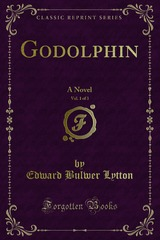
- Second publication, 1840
- Author: Edward Bulwer-Lytton
- Original title: Godolphin
- Language: English
- Genre: Romance, Satire
- Published: 1833
- Publication place: England
- Media type: Print

Godolphin is a satirical 19th-century romance novel by British writer Edward Bulwer-Lytton. It is about the life of an idealistic man, Percy Godolphin, and his eventual lover, Constance Vernon. Written as a frame narrative, Godolphin provides a satirical insight into the day-to-day lives of the early 19th-century British elite. The story is told through the narration of two protagonists, Percy Godolphin and Constance Vernon, as they rise to prominence among the London elite.

Godolphin was published two years after The Reform Bill passed which put an end to the exclusive high class in England. Bulwer-Lytton, being a politician, was a member of this British elite. Literary scholar William Cragg reveals that the original novel published in 1833 was replaced in 1840 with a revised copy. Bulwer-Lytton received very harsh criticisms upon the novel's original release due to its extremely harsh criticism of specific rival politicians and its appearance as a celebration of the Reform Bill.

== Historical background ==
Godolphin was first published in 1834, two years after the Reform Bill of 1832 passed through the House of Lords, effectively putting an end to the rule of the British elite by greatly increasing the number of people allowed to vote. The bill was opposed by most members of the House of Lords but eventually passed due to overwhelming public support. Edward Bulwer-Lytton was one of the few politicians who supported the Reform Bill. The first publication of Godolphin was a celebration of the bill's passing. The public received the original print very well, but it was met with backlash by the elite due to its calling out specific politicians who found against the bill. Due to this backlash, Lytton revised and republished the novel in 1840, reducing the amount of political vitriol.

== Main characters ==
- Percy Godolphin: The novel's main protagonist, Percy is described as an idealist, with a poet's heart but not a poet's hand.
- Constance Vernon: The novel's secondary protagonist, Constance is described as beautiful, strong, and extremely intelligent. Constance could be seen as an early example of the “new woman.”
- Mr. Saville: A wealthy Englishmen who mentors Godolphin throughout his young adult life.
- Lady Erpingham: A wealthy, distant relative of Constance who takes her after the death of her father when she is 13.
- Lord Erpingham: Politician son of Lady Erpingham who eventually marries Constance.
- Volktman: An astronomy fanatic who teaches Percy the art of astronomy and how it can be used to predict the future, makes a prediction that Percy will die at a young age.
- Lucille: Daughter of Volktman who falls in love with Percy and, after the death of her father, runs away with him.

== Plot summary ==
The novel opens with a deathbed scene in which a man named John Vernon is relaying his dying wishes to his daughter, Constance. John Vernon is an ex-politician who was betrayed by the Whigs, thus losing his fortune. Just before he dies he makes the thirteen-year-old daughter, Constance, swear an oath to marry a high-class powerful man in order to seek revenge on his old political party. After her father's death Constance moves in with a wealthy distant relative, Lady Erpingham.

We are then introduced to a sixteen-year-old Percy Godolphin. Percy resents his lower class upbringing and runs away from his father's home in order make his own way. After a brief stint in the army, Percy's second cousin dies and leaves him 20,000 pounds under the stipulation that he leaves the military.

We now go back to Constance who has grown into a beautiful woman who bases her life around her father's dying wish. She resents love, seeing it as weakness, and devotes herself entirely to fulfilling the mission set out for her by her father. John Goldophin dies and accompanied by Lady Erpingham, a former admirer of John, Constance sets out to attend his funeral. Upon arriving at the “ruins” of the Godolphin estate Constance briefly spots Percy standing by a creek lost in deep thought and is immediately infatuated with him. Lady Erpingham also takes a liking to Percy and invites him to visit them at the Erpingham manor. After spending a few weeks with the Erpingham's Percy and Constance begin to develop feelings for each other. Just before Percy departs he subtly confesses these feelings to Constance. Even though she does feel the same, she is conflicted due to the oath she made to her father and keeps her feelings hidden.

Soon after Percy departs, Lady Erpingham's son returns home. Lord Erpingham is described as a Whig of the old school. Lady Erpingham throws a ball to celebrate her son's return home. Percy arrives, sees Constance dancing with Lord Erpingham, and becomes very jealous. At the end of the night Godolphin angrily confronts Constance who is reduced to apologetic tears. Seeing this, Percy professes his love to her. Constance tells him to meet her at the Western Chamber of the Erpingham manor the following day, but she warns him not to get his hopes up. When they meet the following day Constance tells Percy that, despite her feelings for him, she cannot marry him because of the oath she made to her father. Percy pleads with her but she refuses and says she does not wish to see him again. A few months later Percy hears that Constance is to marry Lord Erpingham, this distresses him to the point where he decides to pack up and leave the country.

We briefly return to the narration of Constance who is newly wed to Lord Erpingham. Constance is working to gain social influence within her husband's political party, she proves to be very adept at this and before long she is admired by the entirety of the British elite in London. She still has strong feelings for Percy and thinks of him often, but she is too determined to let that stop her.

Through an extended flashback we now learn of Percy's time in Rome just after he left the company of Seville five years earlier. He had been studying astronomy under a man named Volktman. Volktman is a fanatic of sorts. He believes that he can see the future through the stars and he has dedicated his life to this pursuit. He has a thirteen-year-old daughter named Lucilla who is described as having the same idealistic nature as Percy. Unaware to Percy, Lucilla develops strong feelings towards him and after he leaves she attempts to mold herself to be like him. At the end of this flashback Volktman tells Percy that he has seen in the stars that Percy's father will soon die and that both Lucilla and his life will be intertwined, both ending in tragedy. The next day Percy learns that his father has died and travels back to England.

Coming back into real time, Volktman has fallen deathly ill and wishes to see Godolphin one last time. Coincidentally, at moment later Percy, having gone back to Rome to try and forget about Constance, walks into Volktman's house. After a brief conversation with Percy, in which Volktman tells him that he must look after Lucilla, Volktman dies. Lucilla is sent to live with her aunt, but having been alone with her father most of her life has a difficult time adjusting to normal life. She confesses her love to Percy who at first denies her but then realizes he loves her as well. A conflicted Percy attempts to leave town in order to get away from Lucilla but when she runs away and follows him he gives into his desires and decides to run away with Lucilla.

Percy and Lucilla live as hermits for two years in a cabin by an isolated lake not far from Rome. Over time Percy becomes more and more unsettled with this situation and Lucilla's childish naivety, but he knows that leaving would destroy her. He decides that he will go spend a few weeks in Rome in order to clear his head. In Rome, Percy learns that Lord Erpingham has died in a horse-riding accident, leaving Constance widowed. They re-unite and their love is instantly rekindled. Lucilla finds out about this upon coming to Rome to search for Percy and is crushed, she leaves a note in Percy's apartment and disappears.

Percy and Constance go back to London and marry. Just as with Lucilla though, Percy's idealistic nature causes him to see many flaws in Constance and their relationship becomes stressed. After a few years have passed, Constance hears of a woman who claims to be a mystic and is visited by many politicians and other members of the British elite asking for guidance. Around this same time Percy becomes plagued by nightmares about Lucilla and after Constance hears him muttering Lucilla's name in his sleep she begins to suspect that Lucilla and the mystic are one and the same. She goes and visits the mystery woman and, after bringing up Percy, it is quickly revealed that her suspicions were correct.

Constance and Percy rekindle their relationship once again when Constance decides to abandon the mission given to her by her father and support Percy in joining Parliament as a member of the Whigs. Out of love for Constance Percy forgoes his own political beliefs and votes for the reform bill that would dismantle the British elite. The bill passes and Percy and Constance decide to move back out to Percy's father's old estate to be alone.

Upon arriving, Percy discovers that Constance has fulfilled his father's last wish and restored the Godolphin family estate. In order to celebrate and be friendly with the neighbors Percy and Constance decide to throw a ball. As the ball is about to begin a letter informs Godolphin that Lucilla is on her deathbed in a town just four miles away and she wishes to see him one last time before she dies. Despite a brewing storm Percy rides out to see her. On her deathbed Lucilla tells Percy that she forgives him. Just before dying she cryptically says, “your last hour, is also at hand.” Godolphin starts back home in the midst of the raging storm. Failing to account for the flooding he steers his horse towards the bank of the river and is struck by a falling branch, which knocks him into the river. His horse returns riderless to Constance and the next morning Percy Godolphin's body is discovered in the shallows of the ford.

== Major themes ==
Idealism - Throughout Percy Godolphin's life he seems doomed to never be satisfied. No matter what he achieves, reality never quite lives up to the ideal he has created in his head. Even when he eventually marries the woman he considers to be the love of his life, he soon realizes she is not the same person he has idealized. This theme explores the growing trend towards idealism coming from The Enlightenment, showing that if a person's head is not grounded in reality they will be doomed to constant disappointment when life does not live up to their idealistic standards.

Legacy - Both Percy Goldolphin and Constance Vernon are given dying wishes by their father's. Percy is given the mission of restoring their family estate to its former glory, while Constance is made to swear that she will avenge her father's political downfall. Percy chooses to ignore this dying wish, due to his father's low social standing, whereas Constance bases her entire life around achieving her father's lost status. This highlights the social order of early 19th century British society. Specifically, the way in which social standing defined the worth of a family name.

Gender role reversal - Percy and Constance both reject the typical gender roles of the Victorian Era. Percy gains wealth, status, and power without ever doing anything, he does not work and instead focuses his life on the women he loves. His eventual fortune comes from marrying Constance and once they are married he is the one who spends the money recklessly while she acts conservatively with it. Constance sees love as weakness and focuses her entire life on gaining political influence. She is the one who takes initiative both in her social life and her relationship with Percy. Constance could be considered a precursor to the "New Woman."

== Genre and style ==
Godolphin is a satirical romance novel. Romance is the main genre of the novel as it is the underlying goal of the main protagonist. The satire is in the reversal of gender roles and the eternally lazy lifestyles of the elite. The elite, who are almost all politicians, spend the majority of their time traveling, doing leisurely activities, and throwing parties. There are only a handful of scenes in the entire novel which actually discuss the characters doing any kind of work. While the novel goes against some proto-Victorian norms with its main characters, the rest of the characters fit the typical archetypes of what men and women should be. The men are typically strong willed, uncaring, and assertive. The women are caught up in romance and concerned almost entirely with status.

== Reception ==
Godolphin was very popular when it was first published in 1833, considered Bulwer-Lytton's finest publication yet. While received warmly by the public, the novel received mixed reviews in contemporary periodicals. A review published in the journal Athenaeum praised Godolphin for its clever satire, upbeat drama, romance, and a delineation of character that was not commonplace at the time. The review specifically praises Mr. Saville's deathbed scene, calling it “a masterpiece.” But The Literary Gazette criticized the novel for its long-winded prose, which did not lead to conclusions. The biggest problem with the novel, according to the Literary Gazette, was that Percy's relationship with Lucille was immoral and their connection to astrology “spit in the face of reason.”

== Contemporary criticism ==
Literary scholar William Cragg reveals that there are actually two different versions of Godolphin. The first was released in 1833 and was wildly controversial. Bulwer-Lytton was a very liberal politician at the time and the original version of Godolphin was a celebration of the passing of The Reform Bill in parliament. The original novel contained obvious mockery of several rival politicians. Due to the controversy caused by this, Lytton released a revised version of the novel in 1840.

== Sources ==
- "Godolphin: a Novel". The Athenaeum (288): 276–277. 4 May 1833. ProQuest 8683787.
