= Rosina Bulwer-Lytton =

Anglo-Irish writer (1802–1882)

The Right Honourable The Lady Lytton
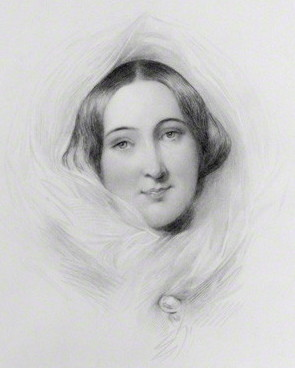
- Born: Rosina Doyle Wheeler; 2 November 1802; Ballywhire, Co. Limerick
- Died: 12 March 1882 (aged 79)
- Spouse: Edward Bulwer-Lytton (m. 1827; died 1873)
- Children: 2, including Robert
- Parent(s): Francis Massey Wheeler; Anna Wheeler

Rosina Bulwer Lytton, Baroness Lytton, (née Doyle Wheeler; 2 November 1802 – 12 March 1882) was an Anglo-Irish writer who published fourteen novels, a volume of essays, and a volume of letters.

In 1827, she married Edward Bulwer-Lytton, a novelist and politician. Their marriage ended, and he falsely accused her of insanity and had her detained in an insane asylum, which provoked a public outcry. He was made a baronet in the 1830s and was raised to the peerage in 1866; although she had separated from her husband, Lytton used the title Lady Lytton. She spelled her married surname without the hyphen used by her husband.

== Early life ==
Rosina Doyle Wheeler's mother was the women's rights advocate Anna Wheeler, the daughter of the Rev. Nicholas Milley Doyle, a Church of Ireland clergyman, Rector of Newcastle, while her father was Francis Massey Wheeler, an Anglo-Irish landowner. One of her mother's brothers, Sir John Milley Doyle (1781–1856), led British and Portuguese forces in the Peninsular War and the War of the Two Brothers.

Wheeler was educated in part by Frances Arabella Rowden, who was not only a poet, but, according to Mary Mitford, "had a knack of making poetesses of her pupils" This ties her to others among Rowden's pupils, such as Caroline Ponsonby, later Lady Caroline Lamb; the poet Letitia Elizabeth Landon ("L.E.L."); Emma Roberts, the travel writer; and Anna Maria Fielding, who published as Mrs. S. C. Hall.

== Marriage ==
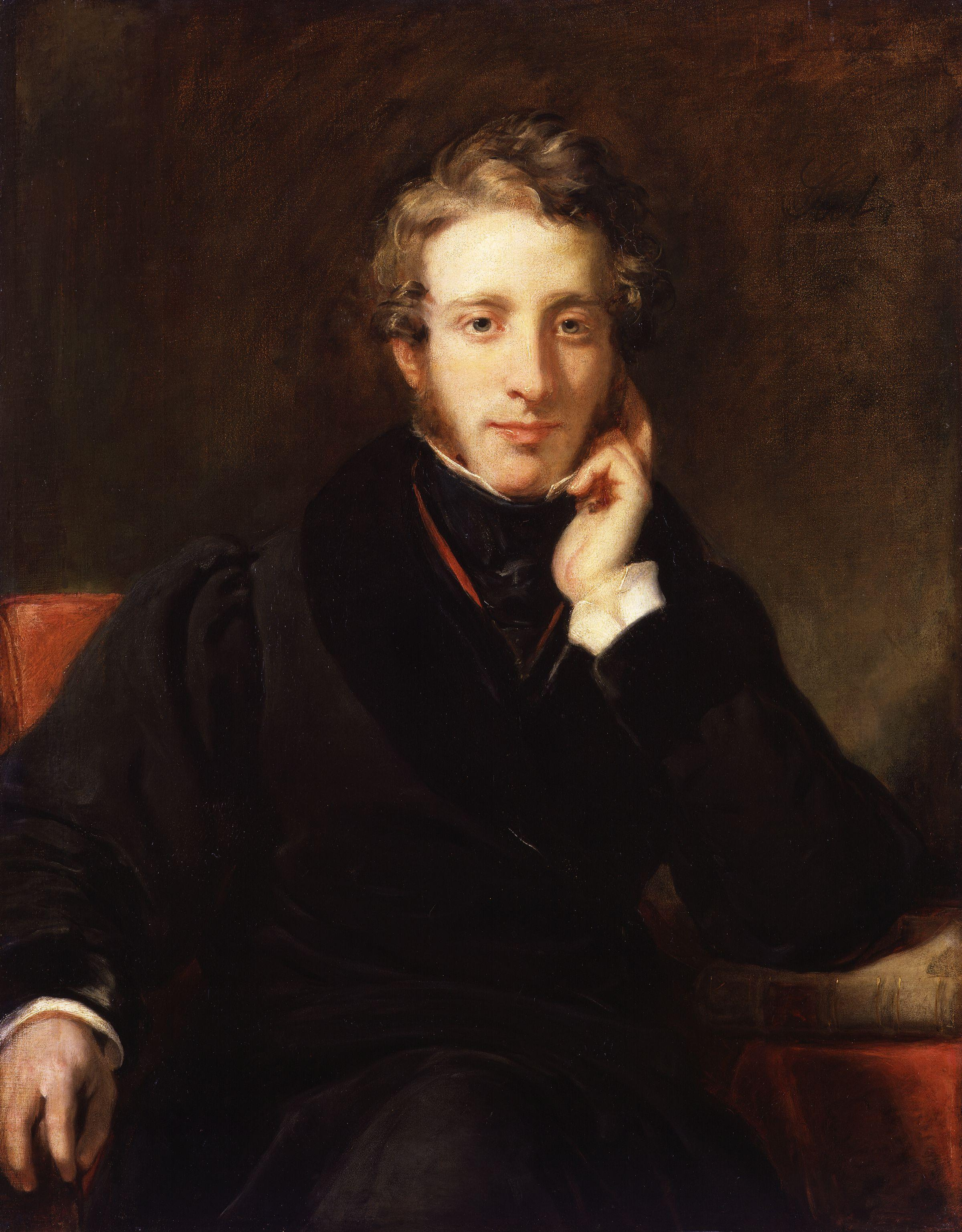
Portrait of Edward Bulwer-Lytton by Henry William Pickersgill, 1831

Wheeler married Edward Bulwer-Lytton (at that time surnamed simply Bulwer) on 29 August 1827. This was against the wishes of his mother, who withdrew his allowance so that he was forced to work for a living.

His writing and efforts in the political arena and infidelity took a toll upon their marriage, and the couple legally separated in 1836. Her children were taken from her. In 1839, she published her novel, Cheveley, or the Man of Honour, in which Edward Bulwer-Lytton was caricatured.

In June 1858, Edward Bulwer-Lytton was standing in a by-election as a parliamentary candidate for Hertfordshire (prior to his elevation to the peerage). She appeared at the hustings and indignantly denounced him, a scene that her son, Robert, commemorated in sarcastic verse:

Who came to Hertford in a chaise
And uttered anything but praise
About the author of my days?
My Mother.

She was consequently placed under restraint as insane, and was detained in an establishment in Brentford, but liberated a few weeks later following a public outcry. The imprisonment of socially inconvenient women, at the behest of their male relatives, had been revealed to the public with the case of Louisa Nottidge and Wilkie Collins's novel based on it, The Woman in White. She wrote of her experience in A Blighted Life (1880). Although the book appeared after her husband's death, it caused a rift with her son and she tried to disassociate herself from it.

== Death ==
Lady Lytton died in Upper Sydenham. While her husband was buried in Westminster Abbey, she was buried in an unmarked grave.

== Children ==
They had two children:

- Emily Elizabeth Bulwer-Lytton (17 June 1828 – 29 April 1848); died in mysterious circumstances
- (Edward) Robert Lytton Bulwer-Lytton (8 November 1831 – 24 November 1891); Viceroy of British India from 1876 to 1880

== Works ==
- Cheveley: or, The Man of Honour (in two volumes, 1839)
- The Budget of the Bubble Family (1840)
- The Prince-Duke and the Page: An Historical Novel (1843)
- Bianca Cappello: An Historical Romance (1843)
- Memoirs of a Muscovite (1844)
- The Peer's Daughters: A Novel (1849)
- Miriam Sedley, or the Tares and the Wheat: A Tale of Real Life (1850)
- The School for Husbands: or Moliére's Life and Times (1852)
- Behind the Scenes, A Novel (1854)
- The World and His Wife, or a Person of Consequence, a Photographic Novel (1858)
- Very Successful (1859)
- The Household Fairy (1870)
- Where there's a Will there's a Way (1871)
- Chumber Chase (1871)
- Shells from the Sands of Time (1876)
- A Blighted Life (1880)
- Refutation of an Audacious Forgery of the Dowager Lady's name to a book of the Publication of which she was totally Ignorant (1880)
