= Ernest Maltravers (novel) =

1837 novel

- Author: Edward Bulwer-Lytton
- Language: English
- Genre: Gothic
- Publisher: Saunders and Otley
- Publication date: 1837
- Publication place: United Kingdom
- Media type: Print
- Followed by: Alice or The Mysteries

Ernest Maltravers is an 1837 novel by the British writer Edward Bulwer-Lytton, originally published in three volumes. It is Gothic in style, and features a protagonist combining "Byronic stature and Coleridgean philosophical ambition". It was followed by a sequel, Alice.

The following year it was adapted into a stage play of the same title by Louisa Medina, which first appeared on 28 March 1838 at the National Theatre in New York City.

== Film versions ==
In 1914 it was adapted into an American short silent film, Ernest Maltravers, directed by Travers Vale. A further silent film, the British feature-length Ernest Maltravers, was released in 1920, directed by Jack Denton and starring Lillian Hall-Davis.

== Bibliography ==
- Goble, Alan. The Complete Index to Literary Sources in Film. Walter de Gruyter, 1999.
- Graham, Sarah (ed.) A History of the Bildungsroman. Cambridge University Press, 2019.
- Mulvey-Roberts, Marie (ed.)The Handbook to Gothic Literature. NYU Press, 1998.
- Rodríguez, Miriam López & María Dolores Narbona Carrión (ed.) Women's Contribution to Nineteenth-century American Theatre. Universitat de València, 28 Nov 2011.
