= Guardian of the Threshold =

Menacing paranormal figure

The Guardian of the Threshold (or Dweller on the Threshold) is a menacing figure described by a number of esoteric teachers. It is claimed to be a spectral image which manifests itself as soon as "the student of the spirit ascends upon the path into the higher worlds of knowledge". The Guardian of the Threshold is also the title of the third play (of a tetralogy of Mystery Dramas) written by Rudolf Steiner in 1912.

== According to Theosophy ==
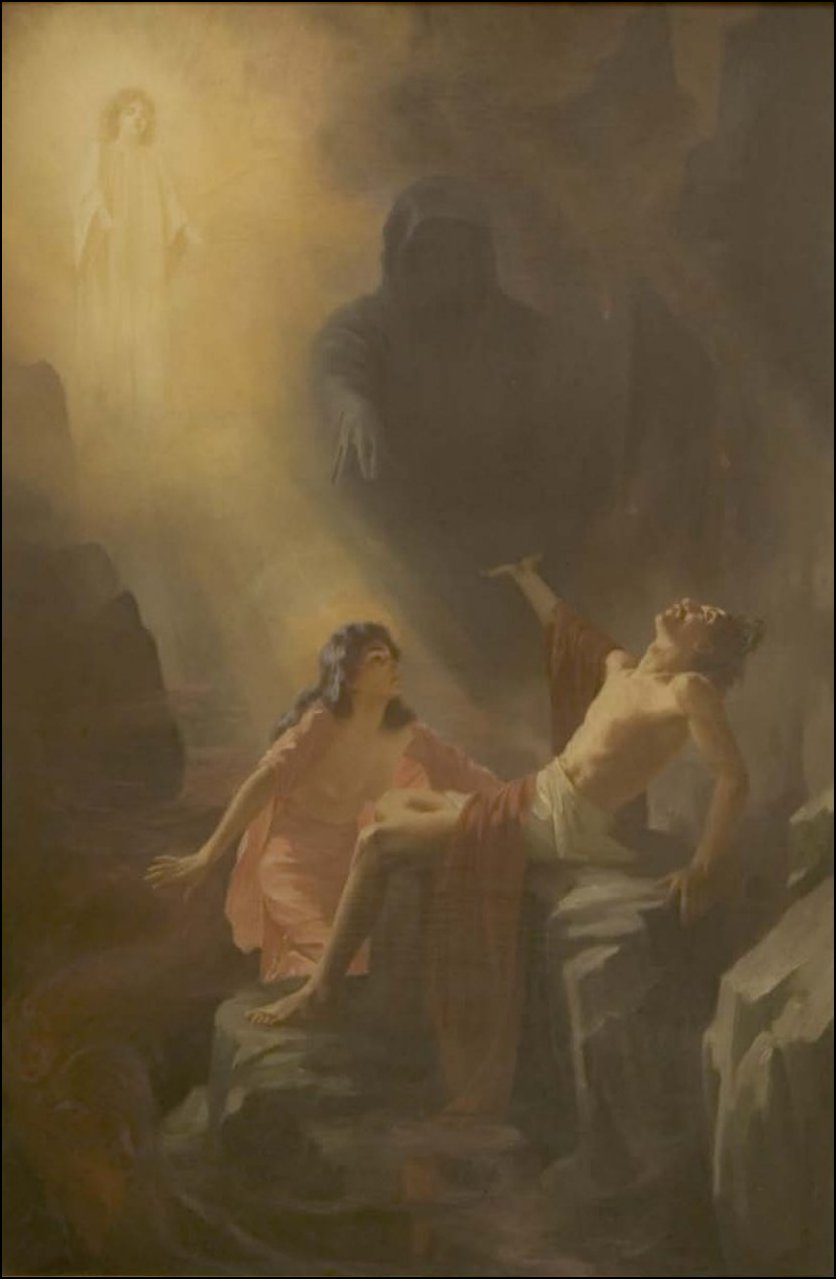
The Dweller on the Threshold, painted by R. Machell (1854–1927)

The "Dweller of the Threshold" (or "Guardian of the Threshold") as a literary invention of the English mystic and novelist Edward Bulwer-Lytton is found in his romance Zanoni (1842). After the founding of the Theosophical Society in 1875, the term gained wide currency in theosophical circles. The Guardian of the Threshold is a spectral figure and is the abstract of the debit and credit book of the individual. "It is the combined evil influence that is the result of the wicked thoughts and acts of the age in which any one may live, and it assumes to each student a definite shape at each appearance, being always either of one sort or changing each time".

"This Dweller of the Threshold meets us in many shapes. It is the Cerberus guarding the entrance to Hades; the Dragon which St. Michael (spiritual will-power) is going to kill; the Snake which tempted Eve, and whose head will be crushed by the heel of the woman; the Hobgoblin watching the place where the treasure is buried, etc. He is the king of evil, who will not permit that within his kingdom a child should grow up, which might surpass him in power; the Herod before whose wrath the divine child Christ has to flee into a foreign country, and is not permitted to return to his home (the soul) until the king (Ambition, Pride, Vanity, Self-righteousness, etc.) is dethroned or dead."

Max Heindel, an American occultist, claimed the Dweller on the Threshold must be confronted by every aspirant—usually at an early stage of their progress.

== In Rudolf Steiner's drama ==
In Rudolf Steiner's play The Guardian of the Threshold, first performed in 1912 and the third in a series of four "Mystery Dramas", the appearance of the Guardian is connected with Lucifer and Ahriman. Steiner explained that the meeting with the Guardian of the Threshold as presented in those dramas was to show that a person (man or woman) who had made the soul clairvoyant, must go back and forth across that threshold and know how to be rightly in the spiritual world on the far side, as well as on this side in the physical world.

== See also ==
- A Dweller on Two Planets
- Choronzon
- The Moon Pool
