= Edmund Downey =

Irish writer and publisher (1856–1937)

Edmund Downey (nom de plume F. M. Allen) (24 July 1856, in Waterford – 11 February 1937, in Waterford) was an Irish novelist, newspaper editor, and publisher.

After education at Catholic University High School, Waterford and St. John's College, Waterford, Edmund Downey went to London and worked there as a journalist from 1878 to 1906. He was active in the Southwark Irish Literary Club. With William Tinsley, Edmund Downey was the co-editor of Tinsley's Magazine from autumn 1879 to September 1884.

In 1884 Osbert Ward (1857–1949) and Edmund Downey were the co-founders of Ward & Downey, which published 277 titles from 1884 to 1897. Ward & Downey published many books of outstanding literary value by Irish authors, including John Augustus O'Shea, Richard Dowling (Downey's cousin), Richard Ashe King, Standish O'Grady, Hester Sigerson ("A Ruined Race"), and Joseph Fogerty, as well as the English-born Tighe Hopkins, whose parents were born in Ireland. Downey left the firm in 1890 and started a publishing company under his own name in 1894. He wrote more than 20 books; some were published by Heinemann, by Chatto & Windus, and by various American corresponding publishers, chiefly Appleton and Pratt. Several of his novels belong to the genre of fantasy or science fiction.

In 1906 Downey returned to his native city to become the proprietor and editor of the Waterford News. His newspaper supported Sinn Féin, and he became Sinn Féin's honorary treasurer during the Irish War of Independence. Downey supported Fianna Fáil upon its foundation in 1926.

His first wife was Frances Margaret Downey née Allen, who died in 1918; they had 7 children. His second wife was Bridget Josephine Downey née Quinlan (1898–1983).

== Selected publications ==
- Anchor Watch Yarns. 1884. vol. 1. Downey & co. 1883.
- In One Town. 1885.
- A House of Tears. 1886.
- Through Green Glasses: Andy Kerrigan's Great Discovery and Other Irish Tales. D. Appleton & company. 1887.
- The Voyage of the Ark. 1888.
- From the Green Bag. 1889.
- Brayhard. 1890.
- Captain Lanagan's Log. Ward and Downey. 1891.
- Green as Grass. 1892.
- Round Tower of Babel. 1892.
- The Land Smeller. 1893.
- Merchant of Killogue. Once-a-week library.v. 11, no. 25-26. P.F. Collier. 1894.
- Ballybeg Junction. 1894.
- Little Green Man. 1895.
- Pinches of Salt. 1895.
- The Ugly Man. 1896.
- Mr. Boynton. 1899.
- London's Peril. 1900.
- Clashmore. 1903.
- The Brass Ring. 1904.
- Twenty Years Ago. Hurst and Blackett. 1905.
- Dorothy Tuke. 1905.
- Charles Lever. W. Blackwood and sons. 1906.
- Dunleary. 1911.
- The Story of Waterford. 1914.
