= Kenelm Chillingly =

1873 novel

- Author: Edward Bulwer-Lytton
- Language: English
- Genre: Comedy, Bildungsroman
- Publisher: William Blackwood and Sons
- Publication date: 1873
- Publication place: United Kingdom
- Media type: Print

Kenelm Chillingly is an 1873 comedy novel by the British writer and politician Edward Bulwer-Lytton. It is a satirical coming of age story that focuses on elements of Victorian society. It was published in three volumes by William Blackwood. It was published the same year as his death and was his penultimate work before the posthumous The Parisians.

== Bibliography ==
- Bilodeau, Arthur E. Pugilistic Rhetoric in Eighteenth and Nineteenth Century England. Indiana University Press, 2011.
- O'Gorman, Francis. Victorian Literature and Finance. Oxford University Press, 2007.
- Page, Michael R. The Literary Imagination from Erasmus Darwin to H.G. Wells. Ashgate, 2012.
