= Edward Bulwer-Lytton =

British statesman and writer (1803–1873)

The Right Honourable The Lord Lytton GCMG PC
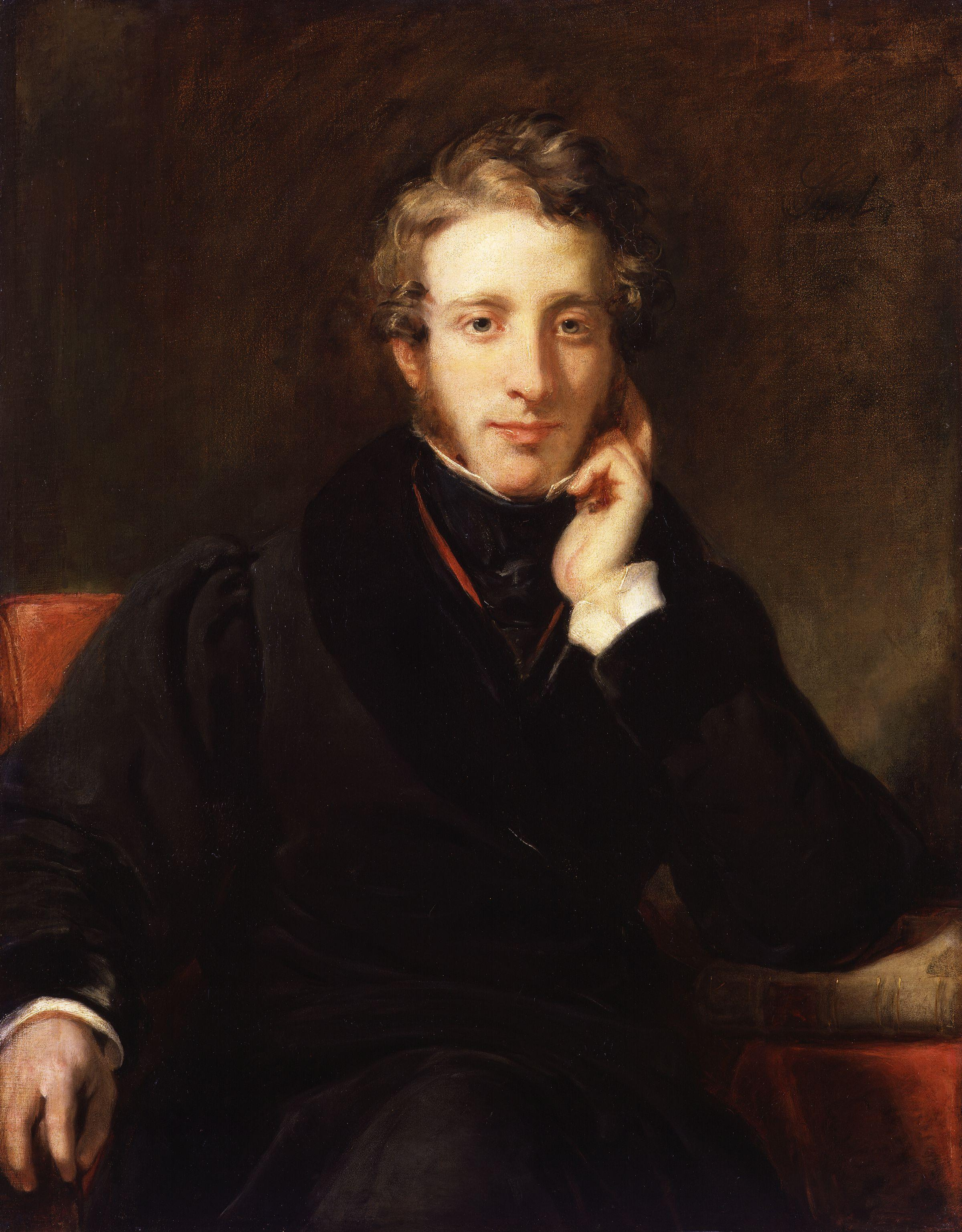
- Portrait of Edward Bulwer-Lytton by Henry William Pickersgill, 1831

Secretary of State for the Colonies
- In office 5 June 1858 – 11 June 1859
- Monarch: Victoria
- Prime Minister: The Earl of Derby
- Preceded by: Lord Stanley
- Succeeded by: The Duke of Newcastle

Personal details
- Born: Edward George Earle Lytton Bulwer; 25 May 1803 London, England
- Died: 18 January 1873 (aged 69) Torquay, England
- Party: Whig (1831–1841); Conservative (1851–1866)
- Spouse: Rosina Doyle Wheeler (m. 1827)
- Children: 2, including Robert
- Parent(s): William Earle Bulwer; Elizabeth Barbara Warburton-Lytton
- Education: Trinity College, Cambridge; Trinity Hall, Cambridge
- Writing career
- Genres: Gothic; silver fork
- Notable work: Pelham

Edward George Earle Lytton Bulwer-Lytton, 1st Baron Lytton (/ˈbʊlwər/; 25 May 1803 – 18 January 1873) was an English writer and politician. He served as a Whig member of Parliament from 1831 to 1841 and a Conservative from 1851 to 1866. He was Secretary of State for the Colonies from June 1858 to June 1859, as which he selected Richard Clement Moody to found British Columbia. He was created Baron Lytton of Knebworth in 1866.

Bulwer-Lytton's works were well known in his time. He coined famous phrases like "pursuit of the almighty dollar", "the pen is mightier than the sword", "dweller on the threshold", "the great unwashed", and the opening phrase (incipit) "It was a dark and stormy night". The sardonic Bulwer-Lytton Fiction Contest, held annually from 1982 to 2024, claimed to seek the "opening sentence of the worst of all possible novels".

== Life ==
Bulwer was born on 25 May 1803 to General William Earle Bulwer of Heydon Hall and Wood Dalling, Norfolk, and Elizabeth Barbara Lytton, daughter of Richard Warburton Lytton of Knebworth House, Hertfordshire. He had two older brothers, William Earle Lytton Bulwer (1799–1877) and Henry (1801–1872; later Baron Dalling and Bulwer).

His father died and his mother moved to London when he was four years old. When he was 15, a tutor named Wallington, who tutored him at Ealing, encouraged him to publish an immature work: Ishmael and Other Poems. Around this time, Bulwer fell in love, but the woman's father induced her to marry another man. She died about the time that Bulwer went to Cambridge and he stated that her loss affected all his subsequent life.

In 1822 Bulwer-Lytton entered Trinity College, Cambridge, where he met John Auldjo, but soon moved to Trinity Hall. In 1825 he won the Chancellor's Gold Medal for English verse. In the following year he took his BA degree and printed for private circulation a small volume of poems, Weeds and Wild Flowers. He purchased an army commission in 1826, but sold it in 1829 without serving.

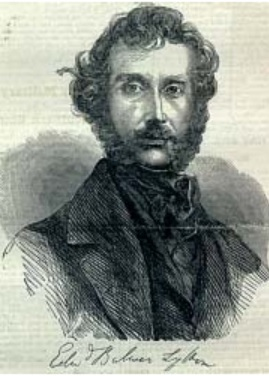
Edward Bulwer-Lytton. His Harold: The Last of the Saxon Kings (1848) was the source for Verdi's opera Aroldo.

In August 1827, he married Rosina Doyle Wheeler (1802–1882), a noted Irish beauty, but against the wishes of his mother, who withdrew his allowance, forcing him to work for a living. They had two children, Emily Elizabeth Bulwer-Lytton (1828–1848), and (Edward) Robert Lytton Bulwer-Lytton, 1st Earl of Lytton (1831–1891) who became Governor-General and Viceroy of British India (1876–1880). His writing and political work strained their marriage and his infidelity embittered Rosina. According to Sir Edmund Gosse, the poet Arthur O'Shaughnessy was one of Bulwer Lytton's many children born out of wedlock.

In 1833, they separated acrimoniously and in 1836 the separation became legal. Three years later, Rosina published Cheveley, or the Man of Honour (1839), satirising her husband's hypocrisy.

In June 1858, when her husband was standing as parliamentary candidate for Hertfordshire, she denounced him at the hustings. He retaliated by threatening her publishers, withholding her allowance and denying her access to their children. Finally he had her committed to a mental asylum, but she was released a few weeks later after a public outcry. This she chronicled in a memoir, A Blighted Life (1880). She continued attacking her husband's character for several years.

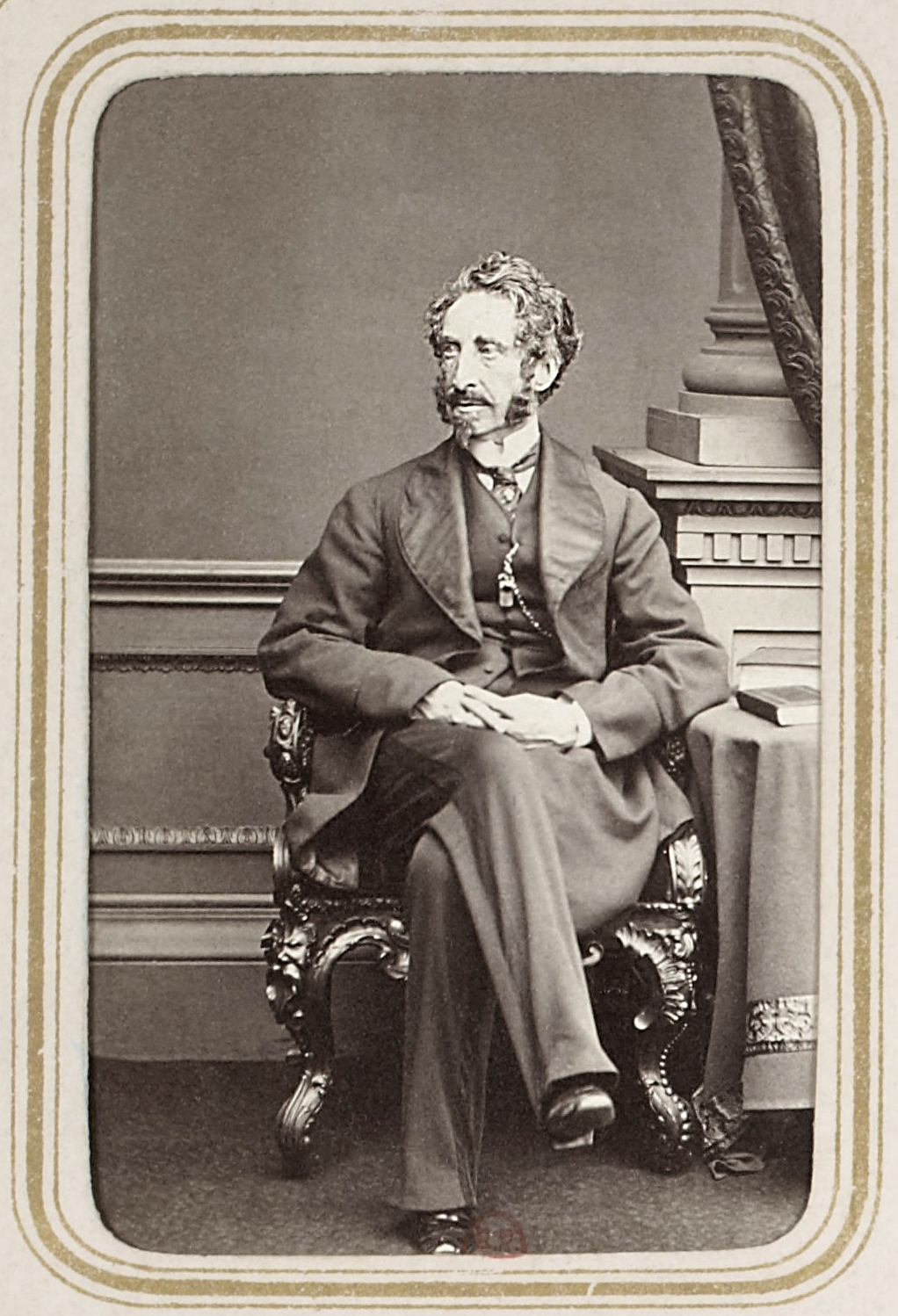
Bulwer-Lytton in later life

The death of Bulwer's mother in 1843 meant his "exhaustion of toil and study had been completed by great anxiety and grief", and by "about the January of 1844, I was thoroughly shattered".

In his mother's room at Knebworth House, which he inherited, he "had inscribed above the mantelpiece a request that future generations preserve the room as his beloved mother had used it". It remains hardly changed to this day.

On 20 February 1844, in accordance with his mother's will, he changed his surname from Bulwer to Bulwer-Lytton and assumed the arms of Lytton by royal licence. His widowed mother had done the same in 1811. His brothers remained plain "Bulwer".

By chance, Bulwer-Lytton encountered a copy of "Captain Claridge's work on the 'Water Cure', as practised by Priessnitz, at Graefenberg" and, "making allowances for certain exaggerations therein", pondered the option of travelling to Graefenberg, but preferred to find something closer to home, with access to his own doctors in case of failure: "I who scarcely lived through a day without leech or potion!". After reading a pamphlet by Doctor James Wilson, who operated a hydropathic establishment with James Manby Gully at Malvern, he stayed there for "some nine or ten weeks", after which he "continued the system some seven weeks longer under Doctor Weiss, at Petersham", then again at "Doctor Schmidt's magnificent hydropathic establishment at Boppart" (at the former Marienberg Convent at Boppard), after developing a cold and fever upon his return home.

The English Rosicrucian society, founded in 1867 by Robert Wentworth Little, claimed Bulwer-Lytton as their "Grand Patron", but he wrote to the society complaining that he was "extremely surprised" by their use of the title, as he had "never sanctioned such". Nevertheless, a number of esoteric groups have continued to claim Bulwer-Lytton as their own, chiefly because some of his writings – such as the 1842 book Zanoni – have included Rosicrucian and other esoteric notions. According to the Fulham Football Club, he once resided in the original Craven Cottage, today the site of their stadium.

Bulwer-Lytton had long suffered from a disease of the ear, and for the last two or three years of his life lived in Torquay nursing his health. After an operation to cure deafness, an abscess formed in the ear and burst; he endured intense pain for a week and died at 2 am on 18 January 1873, just short of his 70th birthday. The cause of death was unclear but it was thought the infection had affected his brain and caused a fit. Rosina outlived him by nine years. Against his wishes, Bulwer-Lytton was honoured with a burial in Westminster Abbey. His historical romance Pausanias the Spartan was left unfinished at his death and was edited and published posthumously by his son in 1876.

== Political career ==
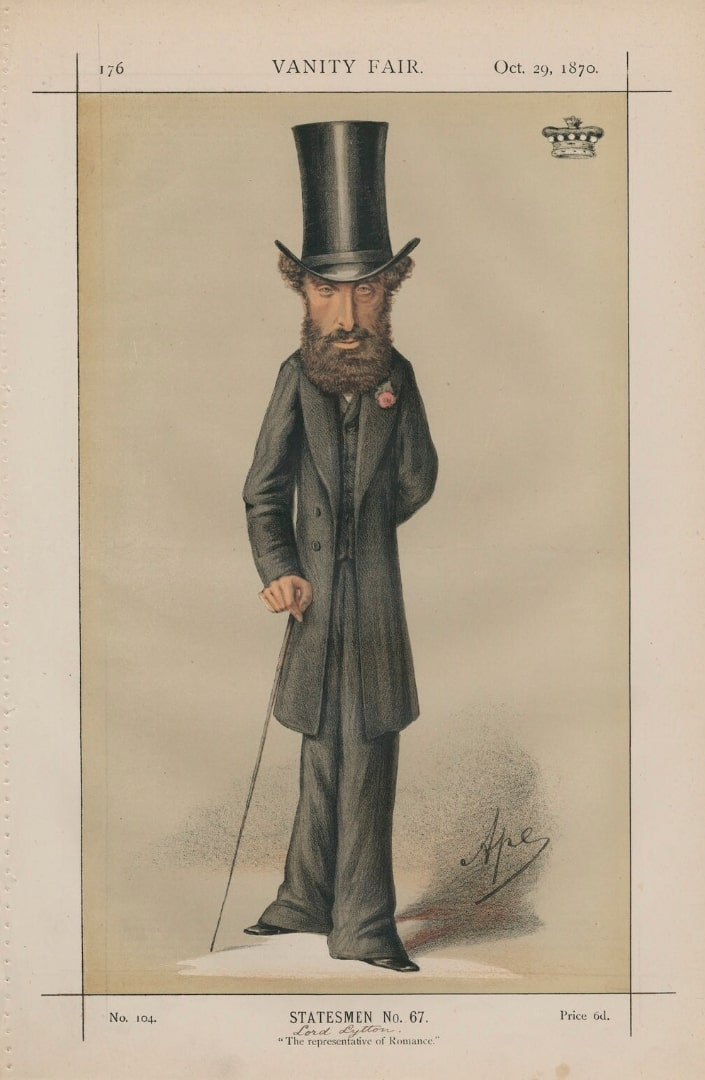
Caricature by "Ape" published in Vanity Fair in 1870

Bulwer began his political career as a follower of Jeremy Bentham. In 1831 he was elected member for St Ives, Cornwall, after which he was returned for Lincoln in 1832, and sat in Parliament for that city for nine years. He spoke in favour of the Reform Bill and took the lead in securing the reduction, after he had vainly supported the repeal, of the newspaper stamp duties. His influence was perhaps most keenly felt after the Whig Party's dismissal from office in 1834, when he issued a pamphlet entitled A Letter to a Late Cabinet Minister on the Crisis. Lord Melbourne, the Prime Minister, offered him a lordship of the Admiralty, which he declined as likely to interfere with his activity as an author.

Bulwer was created a baronet, of Knebworth House in the County of Hertford, in the Baronetage of the United Kingdom, in 1838. In 1841, he left Parliament and spent much of his time in travel. He did not return to politics until 1852, when, having differed from Lord John Russell over the Corn Laws, he stood for Hertfordshire as a Conservative. Bulwer-Lytton held that seat until 1866, when he was raised to the peerage as Baron Lytton of Knebworth in the County of Hertford. In 1858, he entered Lord Derby's government as Secretary of State for the Colonies, thus serving alongside his old friend Benjamin Disraeli. He was comparatively inactive in the House of Lords. In 1870 he was made a Knight Grand Cross of the Order of St Michael and St George.

"Just prior to his government's defeat in 1859 the Secretary of State for the Colonies, Sir Edward Bulwer Lytton, notified Sir George Ferguson Bowen of his appointment as Governor of the new colony to be known as 'Queen's Land'." The draft letter was ranked #4 in the 'Top 150: Documenting Queensland' exhibition when it toured to venues around Queensland from February 2009 to April 2010. The exhibition was part of Queensland State Archives' events and exhibition program which contributed to the state's Q150 celebrations, marking the 150th anniversary of the separation of Queensland from New South Wales.

=== British Columbia ===
When news of the Fraser Canyon Gold Rush reached London, Bulwer-Lytton, as Secretary of State for the Colonies, requested that the War Office recommend a field officer, "a man of good judgement possessing a knowledge of mankind", to lead a Corps of 150 (later increased to 172) Royal Engineers, who had been selected for their "superior discipline and intelligence". The War Office chose Richard Clement Moody, and Lord Lytton, who described Moody as his "distinguished friend", accepted the nomination in view of Moody's military record, his success as Governor of the Falkland Islands, and the distinguished record of his father, Colonel Thomas Moody, Kt. at the Colonial Office. Moody was charged to establish British order and transform the newly established Colony of British Columbia into the British Empire's "bulwark in the farthest west" and "found a second England on the shores of the Pacific". Lytton desired to send to the colony "representatives of the best of British culture, not just a police force", sought men who possessed "courtesy, high breeding and urbane knowledge of the world", and decided to send Moody, whom the Government considered to be the archetypal "English gentleman and British Officer" at the head of the Royal Engineers, Columbia Detachment, to whom he wrote an impassioned letter.

The former HBC Fort Dallas at Camchin, the confluence of the Thompson and the Fraser Rivers, was renamed in his honour by Governor Sir James Douglas in 1858 as Lytton, British Columbia.

== Literary works ==
Bulwer-Lytton's literary career began in 1820 with the publication of a book of poems and spanned much of the 19th century. He wrote in a variety of genres, including historical fiction, mystery, romance, the occult and science fiction. He financed his extravagant way of life with a varied and prolific literary output, sometimes publishing anonymously.

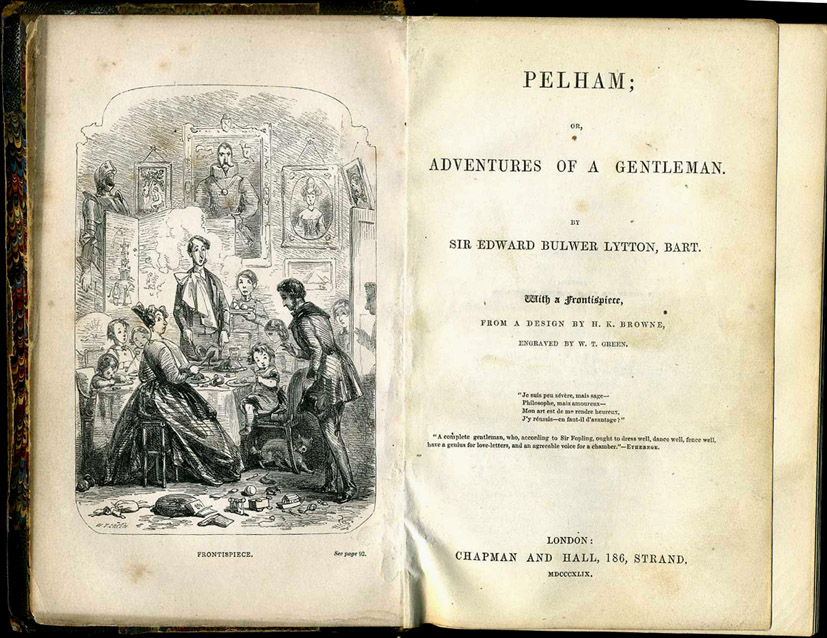
1849 printing of Pelham with Hablot K. Browne (Phiz) frontispiece: Pelham's electioneering visit to the Rev. Combermere St Quintin, who is surprised at dinner with his family.

Bulwer-Lytton published Falkland in 1827, a novel which was only a moderate success. But Pelham brought him public acclaim in 1828 and established his reputation as a wit and dandy. Its intricate plot and humorous, intimate portrayal of pre-Victorian dandyism kept gossips busy trying to associate public figures with characters in the book. Pelham resembled Benjamin Disraeli's first novel Vivian Grey (1827). The character of the villainous Richard Crawford in The Disowned, also published in 1828, borrowed much from that of banker and forger Henry Fauntleroy, who was hanged in London in 1824 before a crowd of some 100,000.

Bulwer-Lytton admired Disraeli's father Isaac D'Israeli, himself a noted author. They began corresponding in the late 1820s and met for the first time in March 1830, when Isaac D'Israeli dined at Bulwer-Lytton's house. Also present that evening were Charles Pelham Villiers and Alexander Cockburn. The young Villiers had a long parliamentary career, while Cockburn became Lord Chief Justice of England in 1859.

Bulwer-Lytton reached his height of popularity with the publication of England and the English, and Godolphin (1833). This was followed by The Pilgrims of the Rhine (1834), The Last Days of Pompeii (1834), Rienzi, Last of the Roman Tribunes about Cola di Rienzo (1835), Ernest Maltravers; or, The Eleusinia (1837), Alice; or, The Mysteries (1838), Leila; or, The Siege of Granada (1838), and Harold: The Last of the Saxon Kings (1848). The Last Days of Pompeii was inspired by Karl Briullov's painting The Last Day of Pompeii, which Bulwer-Lytton saw in Milan.

His New Timon lampooned Tennyson, who responded in kind. Bulwer-Lytton also wrote the horror story The Haunted and the Haunters; or, The House and the Brain (1859). Another novel with a supernatural theme was A Strange Story (1862), which was an influence on Bram Stoker's Dracula.

Bulwer-Lytton wrote many other works, including Vril: The Power of the Coming Race (1871) which drew heavily on his interest in the occult and contributed to the early growth of the science fiction genre. Its story of a subterranean race waiting to reclaim the surface of the Earth is an early science fiction theme. The book popularised the Hollow Earth theory and may have inspired "Nazi mysticism". His term "vril" lent its name to Bovril meat extract. The book was also the theme of a fundraising event held at the Royal Albert Hall in 1891, the Vril-Ya Bazaar and Fete. "Vril" has been adopted by theosophists and occultists since the 1870s and became closely associated with the ideas of an esoteric neo-Nazism after 1945.

His play Money (1840) was first produced at the Theatre Royal, Haymarket, London, on 8 December 1840. The first American production was at the Old Park Theater in New York on 1 February 1841. Subsequent productions include the Prince of Wales's Theatre's in 1872 and as the inaugural play at the new California Theatre in San Francisco in 1869.

Among Bulwer-Lytton's lesser-known contributions to literature was that he convinced Charles Dickens to revise the ending of Great Expectations to make it more palatable to the reading public, as in the original version of the novel, Pip and Estella unambiguously remain apart.

== Legacy ==
Bulwer-Lytton's works had an influence in a number of fields.

=== Quotations ===
Bulwer-Lytton's most famous quotation is "The pen is mightier than the sword" from his play Richelieu:

beneath the rule of men entirely great, the pen is mightier than the sword

He popularized the phrase "pursuit of the almighty dollar" from his novel The Coming Race, and he is credited with "the great unwashed", using this disparaging term in his 1830 novel Paul Clifford:

He is certainly a man who bathes and "lives cleanly", (two especial charges preferred against him by Messrs. the Great Unwashed).

=== Theosophy ===
The writers of theosophy were among those influenced by Bulwer-Lytton's work. Annie Besant and especially Helena Blavatsky incorporated his thoughts and ideas, particularly from The Last Days of Pompeii, Vril, the Power of the Coming Race and Zanoni in her own books.

=== Contest ===
Bulwer-Lytton's name lives on in the annual Bulwer-Lytton Fiction Contest, in which contestants think up terrible openings for imaginary novels, inspired by the first line of his 1830 novel Paul Clifford:

It was a dark and stormy night; the rain fell in torrents – except at occasional intervals, when it was checked by a violent gust of wind which swept up the streets (for it is in London that our scene lies), rattling along the housetops, and fiercely agitating the scanty flame of the lamps that struggled against the darkness.

Entrants in the contest seek to capture the rapid changes in point of view, the florid language, and the atmosphere of the full sentence. The opening was popularized by the Peanuts comic strip, in which Snoopy's sessions on the typewriter usually began with "It was a dark and stormy night". The same words also form the first sentence of Madeleine L'Engle's Newbery Medal–winning novel A Wrinkle in Time. Similar wording appears in Edgar Allan Poe's 1831 short story "The Bargain Lost", although not at the very beginning. It reads:

It was a dark and stormy night. The rain fell in cataracts; and drowsy citizens started, from dreams of the deluge, to gaze upon the boisterous sea, which foamed and bellowed for admittance into the proud towers and marble palaces. Who would have thought of passions so fierce in that calm water that slumbers all day long? At a slight alabaster stand, trembling beneath the ponderous tomes which it supported, sat the hero of our story.

=== Operas ===
Several of Bulwer-Lytton's novels were made into operas. One of them, Rienzi, der Letzte der Tribunen (1842) by Richard Wagner, eventually became more famous than the novel. Leonora (1846) by William Henry Fry, the first European-styled "grand" opera composed in the United States, is based on Bulwer-Lytton's play The Lady of Lyons, as is Frederic Cowen's first opera Pauline (1876). Verdi rival Errico Petrella's most successful opera, Jone (1858), was based on Bulwer-Lytton's The Last Days of Pompeii, and was performed all over the world until the 1880s, and in Italy until 1910. Harold: The Last of the Saxon Kings (1848) provided character names (but little else) for Verdi's opera Aroldo (1857).

=== Theatrical adaptations ===
Shortly after their first publication, The Last Days of Pompeii, Rienzi, and Ernest Maltravers all received successful stage performances in New York. The plays were written by Louisa Medina, one of the most successful playwrights of the 19th century. The Last Days of Pompeii had the longest continuous stage run in New York at the time with 29 straight performances.

=== Magazines ===
In addition to his political and literary work, Bulwer-Lytton became the editor of the New Monthly in 1831, but he resigned the following year. In 1841, he started the Monthly Chronicle, a semi-scientific magazine. During his career he wrote poetry, prose, and stage plays; his last novel was Kenelm Chillingly, which was in course of publication in Blackwood's Magazine at the time of his death in 1873.

=== Translations ===
Bulwer-Lytton's works of fiction and non-fiction were translated in his day and since then into many languages, including Serbian (by Laza Kostic), German, Russian, Norwegian, Swedish, French, Finnish, and Spanish. In 1879, his Ernest Maltravers was the first complete novel from the West to be translated into Japanese.

=== Place names ===
In Brisbane, Queensland, Australia, the suburb of Lytton, the town of Bulwer on Moreton Island (Moorgumpin) and the neighbourhood (former island) of Bulwer Island are named after him. The township of Lytton, Quebec (today part of Montcerf-Lytton) was named after him as was Lytton, British Columbia, and Lytton, Iowa. Lytton Road in Gisborne, New Zealand, was named after the novelist. Later a state secondary school, Lytton High School, was founded in the road. Also in New Zealand, Bulwer is a small locality in Waihinau Bay in the outer Pelorus Sound, New Zealand. It can be reached by 77 km of winding, mostly unsealed, road from Rai Valley. A weekly mail boat service delivers mail and also offers passenger services. In London, Lytton Road in the suburb of Pinner, where the novelist lived, is named after him.

=== Portrayal on television ===
Bulwer-Lytton was portrayed by the actor Brett Usher in the 1978 television serial Disraeli.

== Works ==
=== Non-fiction ===
- England and the English (1833)

=== Novels ===
- Falkland (1827) Available online
- Pelham (1828) Available online
- The Disowned (1829) Available online
- Devereux (1829) Available online
- Paul Clifford (1830) Available online
- Eugene Aram (1832) Available online
- Godolphin (1833) Available online
- Asmodeus at Large (1833) Available online
- The Last Days of Pompeii (1834) Available online
- The Pilgrims of the Rhine (1834) Available online
- Rienzi (1835) Available online
- The Student (1835) Available online
- Ernest Maltravers; or The Eleusinia (1837) Available online
- Alice, or The Mysteries (1838), a sequel to Ernest Maltravers Available online
- Calderon, the Courtier (1838) Available online
- Leila; or, The Siege of Granada (1838) Available online
- Zicci: a Tale (1838) Available online
- Night and Morning (1841) Available online
- Zanoni (1842) Available online
- The Last of the Barons (1843) Available online
- Lucretia; or, The Children of Night (1846) Available online
- Harold: The Last of the Saxon Kings (1848) Available online
- The Caxtons: A Family Picture (1849) Available online
- My Novel, or Varieties in English Life (1853) Available online
- The Haunted and the Haunters; or, The House and the Brain (novelette, 1859) Available online
- What Will He Do With It? (1858) Available online
- A Strange Story (1862) Available online
- The Coming Race (1871), republished as Vril: The Power of the Coming Race – Available online
- Kenelm Chillingly (1873) Available online
- The Parisians (1873) Available online
- Pausanias, the Spartan – Unfinished (1873)

=== Verse ===
- Ismael (1820)
- The Poems and Ballads of Schiller, translator (1844), published by Bernard Tauchnitz, Leipzig
- The New Timon (1846), an attack on Tennyson published anonymously
- King Arthur (1848–1849)

=== Plays ===
- The Duchess de la Vallière (1837)
- The Lady of Lyons (1838)
- Richelieu (1839), adapted for the 1935 film Cardinal Richelieu
- Money (1840)
- Not So Bad as We Seem (1851)
- The Rightful Heir (1868), based on The Sea Captain, an earlier play of Lytton's
- Walpole, or Every Man Has His Price (1869)
- Darnley (unfinished)

== See also ==
- Bulwer-Lytton and Theosophy
- Lytton, Queensland

Parliament of the United Kingdom
Preceded by William Pole-Tylney-Long-Wellesley; James Morrison	Member of Parliament for St Ives; 1831–1832; With: James Halse	Succeeded by James Halse
Preceded by Charles Sibthorp; George Heneage	Member of Parliament for Lincoln; 1832–1841; With: George Heneage to 1835; Charles Sibthorp from 1835	Succeeded by Charles Sibthorp; William Rickford Collett
Preceded by Thomas Plumer Halsey; Sir Henry Meux, Bt; Hon. Thomas Brand	Member of Parliament for Hertfordshire; 1852–1866; With: Thomas Plumer Halsey to 1854; Sir Henry Meux, Bt to 1859; Abel Smith 1854–1857; Christopher William Puller 1857–1864; Abel Smith 1859–1865; Henry Surtees from 1864; Henry Cowper from 1865	Succeeded by Henry Surtees; Henry Cowper; Abel Smith
Political offices
Preceded by Lord Stanley	Secretary of State for the Colonies; 1858–1859	Succeeded by The Duke of Newcastle
Academic offices
Preceded by The Duke of Argyll	Rector of the University of Glasgow; 1856–1859	Succeeded by The Earl of Elgin
Peerage of the United Kingdom
New creation	Baron Lytton; 1866–1873	Succeeded by Robert Bulwer-Lytton
Baronetage of the United Kingdom
New creation	Baronet of Knebworth; 1838–1873	Succeeded by Robert Bulwer-Lytton
