= Pelham (novel) =

1828 novel by Edward Bulwer-Lytton

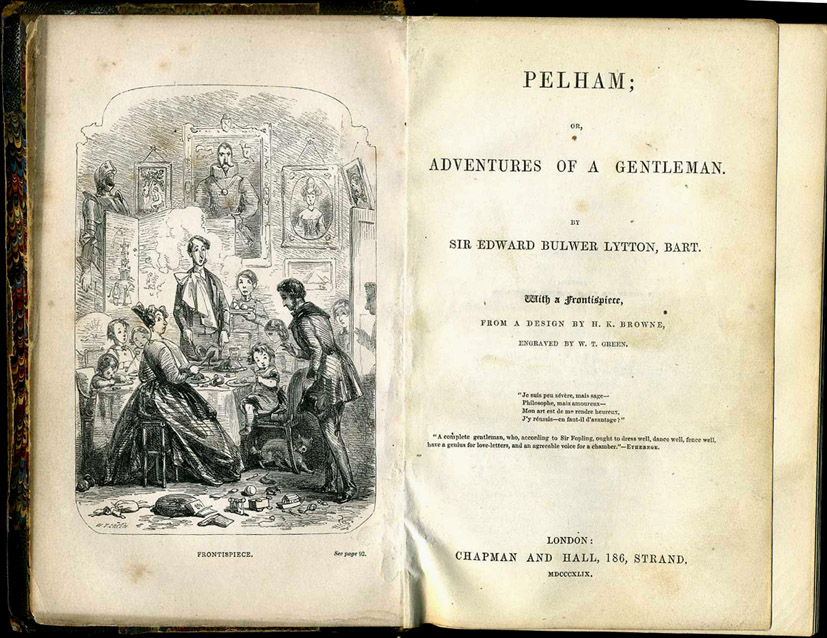
- Author: Edward Bulwer-Lytton
- Language: English
- Genre: Silver Fork
- Publisher: Henry Colburn
- Publication date: 1828
- Publication place: United Kingdom
- Media type: Print

Pelham is an 1828 novel by the British writer Edward Bulwer-Lytton, originally published in three volumes. It was his breakthrough novel, launching him as one of Britain's leading authors. It is part of the tradition of silver fork novels that enjoyed great popularity in the late Regency and early Victorian eras. It follows the adventures of Henry Pelham, a young dandy, in Paris, London and the fashionable spa town of Cheltenham.

The book was an enormous success across Europe, where it was translated into several languages, and was admired by Walter Scott, Benjamin Disraeli and George IV. Partly autobiographical, it contains disguised depictions of members of the high society Ton. This led to widespread speculation about which real-life people they were based on, although Bulwer-Lytton only admitted to one minor character, John Russelton, being based on a real figure, Beau Brummell.

Although the novel is light-hearted for much of the first three-quarters, in the latter stages it transforms into a murder mystery with Gothic overtones. Pelham's old friend is accused of killing a man and faces execution unless Pelham can find the true murderer. The latter stages of the novel are a forerunner of the detective novel and were an inspiration to Edgar Allan Poe, an admirer of Bulwer-Lytton.

In 1834, Alexander Pushkin, in dire financial straits, started sketching a commercial novel called Russian Pelham but abandoned it after just a few pages.

From Pelham onwards, the Gothic is a recurring theme in the author's work, and he has been credited with bringing "Gothic terror out of the past, and out of Central Europe, into the streets of crime-ridden 1820s and 1830s London".

== Bibliography ==
- Adburgham, Alison. Silver Fork Society: Fashionable Life and Literature from 1814 to 1840. Faber & Faber, 2012.
- Copeland, Edward. The Silver Fork Novel: Fashionable Fiction in the Age of Reform. Cambridge University Press, 2012.
- Huckvale, David. A Dark and Stormy Oeuvre: Crime, Magic and Power in the Novels of Edward Bulwer-Lytton. McFarland, 2015.
- Mulvey-Roberts, Marie. The Handbook of the Gothic. Springer, 2016.
- Rosa, Matthew Whiting. The Silver-fork School: Novels of Fashion Preceding Vanity Fair. Columbia University Press, 1936.
