= 1832 in literature =

This article contains information about the literary events and publications of 1832.

== Events ==
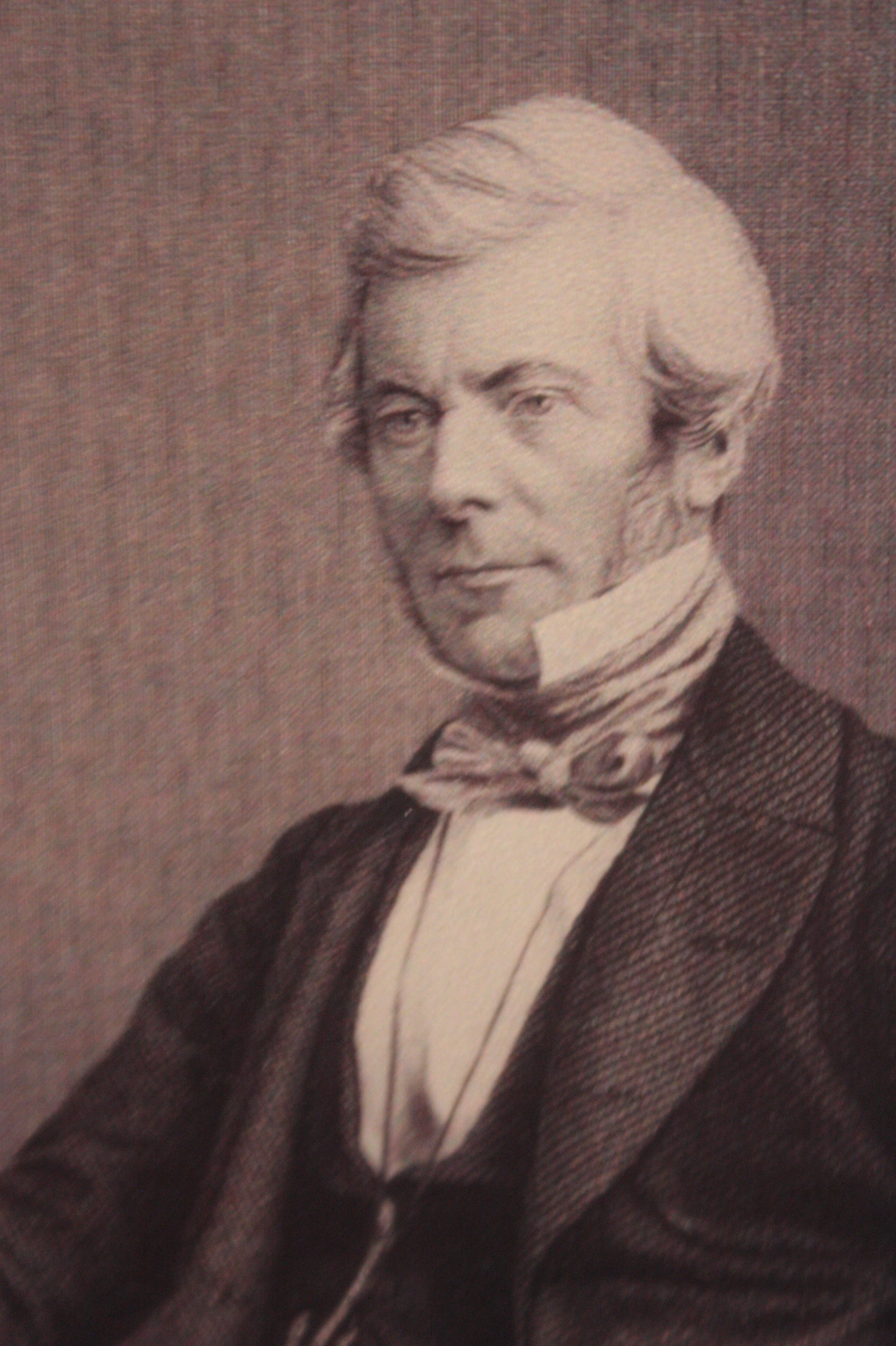
Engraving of William Chambers c. 1845

- February 4 – Chambers's Edinburgh Journal is established by the Scottish publisher William Chambers.William was soon joined as joint editor by his brother Robert, who wrote many of the articles for the early issues. Within a few years, the journal had a circulation of 84,000.
- March 31 – Tait's Edinburgh Magazine is established by William Tait. Tait was an "independent radical" in politics; he strongly favored the Whig party. 1832 was a time of great political ferment, with the first Reform Bill as the dominant subject of discourse. Tait's periodical was intended as a "Radical riposte" to "the politically revanchist but culturally avant-garde Blackwood's Edinburgh Magazine." From 1833 on, Tait's Magazine was a regular venue for the essays of Thomas De Quincey. De Quincey's series of biographical essays on the Lake Poets (later collected as Recollections of the Lake Poets) were featured in Tait's between 1834 and 1840.
- May 21 – The American short-story writer and historian Washington Irving returns to the United States, after living in Europe for seventeen years. Irving was previously a member of the London-based diplomatic staff of the American ambassador to Britain, Louis McLane.Following McLane's recall to the United States in 1831 to serve as the new Secretary of the Treasury, Irving stayed on as the legation's chargé d'affaires until the arrival of Martin Van Buren, President Andrew Jackson's nominee for ambassador to Britain. With Van Buren in place, Irving resigned his post to concentrate on writing.Irving arrived in New York on May 21, 1832, after 17 years abroad. That September, he accompanied the Commissioner on Indian Affairs Henry Leavitt Ellsworth on a surveying mission, along with companions Charles La Trobe and Count Albert-Alexandre de Pourtales. The group traveled deep into the Indian Territory (now the U.S. state of Oklahoma).
- September 21 – The Scottish historical novelist and poet Sir Walter Scott dies aged 61 at his home, Abbotsford House. Scott had suffered a stroke near Emmerich, and had then been transported to England, as a passenger of the steamship SS De Batavier. Since he did not recover from the effects of the stroke, he was transported back to Abbotsford for his expected death.Scott had finished his final novel The Siege of Malta in April 1832, but he had not published it. No steps were taken to publish the novel during the few months that remained of Scott's life, and John Gibson Lockhart, Scott's son-in-law and literary executor, expressed his hope that The Siege of Malta would never see the light of day, since it was of such poor quality that it could only harm Scott's reputation. The manuscript was kept by Scott's descendants at Abbotsford, and several pages of it were given away to souvenir-hunters. In 2008, the entire novel was finally published, together with Bizarro, another of Scott's suppressed stories, in an edition by J. H. Alexander, Judy King, and Graham Tulloch, published by the Edinburgh University Press and the Columbia University Press. This edition presents a literal transcript of the manuscripts, together with a reading text in which the more obvious errors are corrected. It also includes a CD-ROM scan of the manuscript.
- December (or January 1833) – The publisher Richard Bentley issues the first collected edition of Jane Austen's novels. In 1832, Bentley purchased the remaining copyrights to all of Austen's novels, which were previously owned by Austen's sister Cassandra. Over the following winter, Bentley published five illustrated volumes as part of his Standard Novels series. In October 1833, Bentley released the first collected edition of her works. Since then, Austen's novels have been continuously in print.
- Uncertain dates
  - William Ticknor co-founds the publishing house that will become Ticknor and Fields, a predecessor of Houghton Mifflin, in Boston, Massachusetts.
  - James Atkinson makes the first translation from Persian into English of Ferdowsi's Shahnameh, The Sha Nameh of the Persian Poet Firdausi, translated and abridged in prose and verse with notes and illustrations; printed for the Oriental Translation Fund of Great Britain and Ireland; sold by John Murray.
  - The first Baedeker guidebook, Voyage du Rhin de Mayence à Cologne, by Karl Baedeker in Koblenz (his adaptation of J. A. Klein's Rheinreise von Mainz bis Cöln of 1828) is published without a date.
  - Ramón de Mesonero Romanos (as 'El Curioso Parlante') begins writing his series of Escenas matritenses (Madrid scenes), originally in Cartas españolas.
  - Johann Wolfgang von Goethe's Faust: The Second Part of the Tragedy is published.
  - Théâtre des Folies-Dramatiques opened on the site of the Théâtre de l'Ambigu-Comique on the Boulevard du Temple in Paris under Frédérick Lemaître.
  - The early 13th century Færeyinga saga, written in Iceland, is first published.
  - Publishers begin the use of a paper jacket to wrap book covers.
  - Polish scholar Konstanty Swidzinski discovers a 15th-century Bible page called the Karta medycka in the Polish village of Medyka

== New books ==
=== Fiction ===
- Carl Jonas Love Almqvist (anonymous) – Jaktslottet (first in the Törnrosens bok (Book of the Briar Rose) series)
- Honoré de Balzac
  - La Bourse
  - Le Curé de Tours
  - Le Colonel Chabert
  - Louis Lambert
- Edward Bulwer-Lytton – Eugene Aram
- Selina Davenport – The Unchanged
- Alfred de Vigny – Stello
- Benjamin Disraeli – Contarini Fleming
- Catherine Gore
  - The Fair of Mayfair
  - The Opera
- Robert Huish – Fitzallan
- Washington Irving – Tales of the Alhambra
- Letitia Elizabeth Landon - Heath's Book of Beauty, 1833
- Thomas Henry Lister – Arlington
- Frederick Marryat – Newton Forster
- Lord Normanby – The Contrast
- Alexander Pushkin – Dubrovsky
- Charles Augustin Sainte-Beuve – Volupte
- Rosalia St. Clair – The Doomed One
- George Sand
  - Indiana
  - Valentine
- Sir Walter Scott
  - Castle Dangerous
  - Count Robert of Paris
- Charlotte Elizabeth Tonna – Combination

=== Children ===
- Frederick Marryat – Newton Forster
- Catherine Sinclair – Charlie Seymour, or, The Good Aunt and the Bad Aunt

=== Drama ===
- John Baldwin Buckstone – Henriette the Forsaken
- Casimir Delavigne – Louis XI
- Alfred de Vigny – Stello
- Aleksander Fredro – Pan Jowialski (Mr. Jovial)
- Johann Wolfgang von Goethe - Faust, Part Two
- Nikolai Gogol - Marriage
- Victor Hugo – Le Roi s'amuse
- Douglas William Jerrold
  - The Bride of Ludgate
  - The Factory Girl
  - The Rent Day
- Fanny Kemble – Francis the First
- James Sheridan Knowles – The Hunchback
- James Justinian Morier – Zohrab the Hostage
- Li Qianfu (李潛夫), translated by Stanislas Julien – Le Cercle de craie (Circle of Chalk; Chinese: 灰闌記; pinyin: huīlán jì; 14th century)
- Thomas Serle
  - The House of Colberg
  - The Merchant of London

=== Poetry ===
- Leigh Hunt – Poetical Works
- Adam Mickiewicz – Dziady (Forefathers' Eve, poetic drama, part III)
- Aleksandr Pushkin – Eugene Onegin («Евге́ний Оне́гин», serial publication completed)

=== Non-fiction ===
- John Austin -The Province of Jurisprudence Determined
- Carl von Clausewitz (posthumously) – Vom Krieg (On War)
- William Sawrey Gilpin – Practical Hints upon Landscape Gardening: with some remarks on Domestic Architecture, as connected with scenery
- Anna Brownell Jameson – Characteristics of Women
- Lord Mahon – History of the War of Succession in Spain
- Frances Trollope – Domestic Manners of the Americans

== Births ==
- January 13 – Horatio Alger, Jr., American writer (died 1899)
- January 27 – Lewis Carroll (Charles L. Dodgson), English children's writer and scholar (died 1898)
- March 10 – Mary Bigelow Ingham, American author and educator (died 1923)
- April 14 – Wilhelm Busch, German humorist and poet (died 1908)
- May 17 – Grace Webster Haddock Hinsdale, American author (died 1902)
- June 10 – Edwin Arnold, English poet (died 1905)
- June 11 – Jules Vallès, French writer (died 1885)
- June 23 – Gustav Jaeger, German naturalist (died 1917)
- June 30 – Emily Lucas Blackall, American author and philanthropist (died 1892)
- July 27 – Hesba Stretton, English children's author (died 1911)
- July 29 – Mary Fortune, née Wilson, Irish-born Australian writer of detective fiction (died 1911)
- August 3 – Edward Wilmot Blyden, Liberian pan-Africanist (died 1912)
- September 30 – Charlotte Riddell, née Cowan, Anglo-Irish novelist and editor (died 1906)
- October 9 – Elizabeth Akers Allen, American poet and journalist (died 1911)
- October 12 – Theodore Watts-Dunton, English critic and poet (died 1914)
- November 28 – Leslie Stephen, English writer (died 1904)
- November 29 – Louisa May Alcott, American novelist (died 1888)
- December 8 – Bjørnstjerne Bjørnson, Norwegian novelist and Nobel laureate (died 1910)

== Deaths ==
- February 3 – George Crabbe, English poet (born 1754)
- March 22 – Johann Wolfgang von Goethe, German novelist, dramatist and poet (born 1749)
- April 26 – Maria Elizabeth Budden, English novelist and writer of didactic children's books (born c. 1780)
- June 6 – Jeremy Bentham, English philosopher and social reformer (born 1748)
- June 21 – Anna Maria Porter, English poet and novelist (sister of Jane Porter), of typhus (born 1780)
- July 17 – John Carr, English travel writer and lawyer (born 1772)
- September 12 – Priscilla Wakefield, English Quaker writer and philanthropist (born 1751)
- September 21 – Sir Walter Scott, Scottish historical novelist and poet (born 1771)
- November 14 – Rasmus Christian Rask, Danish philologist (born 1787)
- December 18 – Philip Freneau, American poet and polemicist (born 1752)

== Sources ==
- Gilson, David. "Editions and Publishing History". The Jane Austen Companion. Ed. J. David Grey. New York: Macmillan, 1986. ISBN 0-02-545540-0. 135–139
- Gilson, David. "Letter publishing history". Jane Austen in Context. Ed. Janet Todd. Cambridge: Cambridge University Press, 2005. ISBN 0-521-82644-6. 121–159
- Irving, Pierre M. (1862) "The life and letters of Washington Irving" (Cited herein as PMI), vol. 1:26.
- Sherwood, Mary Martha (1857), The life of Mrs Sherwood, Darton & Co., London
- Sultana, Donald E. (1977). The Siege of Malta Rediscovered: An Account of Sir Walter Scott's Mediterranean Journey and his Last Novel. Edinburgh: Scottish Academic Press. ISBN 0-7073-0131-9.
- Southam, B.C. "Juvenilia". The Jane Austen Companion. Ed. J. David Grey. New York: Macmillan, 1986. ISBN 0-02-545540-0. 244–255
