= 1831 in literature =

This article contains information about the literary events and publications of 1831.

== Events ==
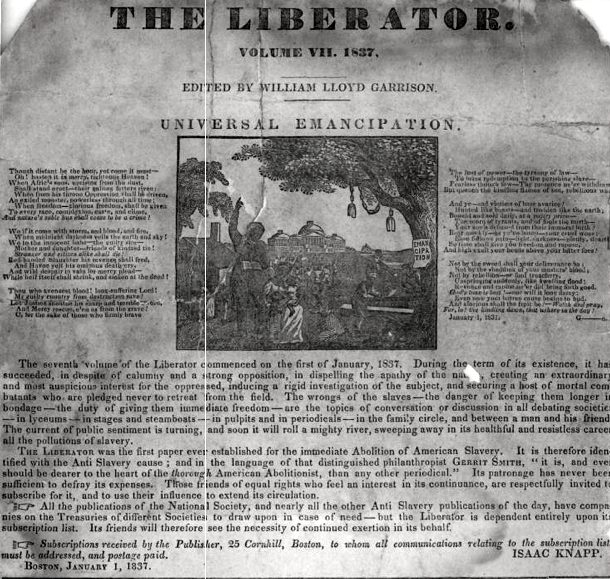
An issue of The Liberator depicting African Americans next to a lynching tree

- January 1 – William Lloyd Garrison begins publication of the The Liberator, a weekly abolitionist newspaper in Boston. Garrison co-published weekly issues of The Liberator continuously for 35 years, from January 1, 1831, to the final issue of December 29, 1865. Although its circulation was only about 3,000, and three-quarters of the subscribers (in 1834) were African Americans, the newspaper earned nationwide notoriety for its uncompromising advocacy of "immediate and complete emancipation of all slaves" in the United States. The Liberator continued for three decades from its founding through the end of the American Civil War. It had Black-American columnists and reporters. Garrison ended the newspaper's run with a valedictory column at the end of 1865, when the ratification of the Thirteenth Amendment abolished slavery throughout the United States. It was succeeded by The Nation.
- February 18 (old style) – Alexander Pushkin marries Natalya Goncharova at the Great Ascension Church on the Bolshaya Nikitskaya Street in Moscow. They officially became engaged in 1830, but the wedding was delayed for a year due to an outbreak of cholera. Pushkin's marriage to Goncharova was largely a happy one, but his wife’s characteristic flirtatiousness and frivolity would lead to his fatal duel in 1837. Pushkin had a highly jealous temperament.He challenged Goncharova's reputed lover Georges-Charles de Heeckeren d'Anthès to a duel, and d'Anthès fired first, mortally wounding Pushkin in the stomach.
- March 16 – Victor Hugo's historical romantic Gothic novel Notre-Dame de Paris, known in English as The Hunchback of Notre-Dame (completed on January 15), is published by Gosselin in Paris. Hugo had an agreement concerning the completion of this novel since 1828. Due to Hugo's other literary projects, the novel fell by the wayside until 1830. The agreement with his original publisher, Gosselin, was that the book would be finished that same year, but Hugo was constantly delayed due to the demands of other projects. In the summer of 1830, Gosselin demanded that Hugo complete the book by February 1831. Beginning in September 1830, Hugo worked nonstop on the project thereafter. Legend has it that Hugo locked himself in his room, getting rid of his clothes to write the novel on time. The idea being he could not go outside without clothes.
- March 19 – The play The Tricolour Cockade by the Cogniard brothers introduces the term "chauvinism".
- April 18 – The Sydney Morning Herald is first published.
- unknown dates
  - Convict Henry Savery's autobiographical fiction Quintus Servinton: a tale founded upon incidents of real occurrence is published anonymously in Tasmania, the first Australian novel.
  - Playwright Manuel Bretón de los Herreros publishes a translation of Tibullus, which secures him an appointment as sub-librarian at the Spanish national library (Biblioteca Pública de Palacio).
  - Daniel Appleton publishes three religious books in New York City, so originating of the firm of D. Appleton & Company.

== New books ==
=== Fiction ===
- Honoré de Balzac
  - La Peau de chagrin
  - Sarrasine
  - Le Chef-d'œuvre inconnu
- John Brownlow – Hans Sloane: a tale
- Cogniard Brothers – The Tricolour Cockade
- Selina Davenport – The Queen's Page
- Benjamin Disraeli – The Young Duke
- Susan Edmonstone Ferrier – Destiny
- Nikolai Gogol – Evenings on a Farm Near Dikanka
- Catherine Gore
  - Mothers and Daughters
  - Pin Money
  - The Tuileries
- Thomas Colley Grattan – Jacqueline of Holland
- Ann Hatton – Gerald Fitzgerald
- Victor Hugo – The Hunchback of Notre-Dame (Notre-Dame de Paris)
- Thomas Love Peacock – Crotchet Castle
- George Sand (as Amantine Aurore Dupin) and Jules Sandeau (as J. Sand) – Rose et Blanche
- Mary Shelley – Frankenstein (revised 1-volume edition)

=== Children ===
- Anne Knight – Mary Gray. A tale for little girls

=== Drama ===
- Robert Montgomery Bird – Gladiator
- Manuel Bretón de los Herreros – Marcela o ¿Cuál de las tres?
- Dulduityn Danzanravjaa – Saran khökhöö (Moon Cuckoo; approximate year)
- Alfred de Vigny – La Maréchale d'Ancre
- Catherine Gore – The School for Coquettes
- Franz Grillparzer – Des Meeres und der Liebe Wellen (Waves of the Sea and of Love)
- Victor Hugo – Marion Delorme
- James Kenney – The Pledge
- James Sheridan Knowles – Alfred the Great
- Alexander Pushkin – Boris Godunov (Борис Годунов, published)
- John Augustus Stone – Tancred, King of Sicily
- Robert Taylor – Swing, or, Who Are the Incendiaries?

=== Poetry ===
- Thomas Hood – The Dream of Eugene Aram, the Murderer
- Giacomo Leopardi – Canti
- Edgar Allan Poe – Poems

=== Non-fiction ===
- Sir John Barrow, 1st Baronet – The Eventful History of the Mutiny and Piratical Seizure of HMS Bounty: Its Cause and Consequences
- Washington Irving – Voyages and Discoveries of the Companions of Columbus
- John Stuart Mill – The Spirit of the Age
- Thomas Moore – The Life and Death of Lord Edward Fitzgerald
- James Cowles Prichard – Eastern Origin of the Celtic Nations
- Mary Prince – The History of Mary Prince, A West Indian Slave

== Births ==
- January 2 – Justin Winsor, American historian and librarian (died 1897)
- January 3 – George Manville Fenn, English novelist and educationalist (died 1909)
- January 14 – John Cordy Jeaffreson, English novelist and non-fiction writer (died 1901)
- February 25 – Jane G. Austin, American writer (died 1894)
- January 26 – Mary Mapes Dodge, American children's writer (died 1907)
- February 16 – Nikolai Leskov, Russian novelist and playwright (died 1895)
- March 29 – Amelia Edith Huddleston Barr, English novelist and teacher (died 1919)
- April 9 – Clara Harrison Stranahan, American author and college founder (died 1905)
- April 19 – Mary Louise Booth, American writer, editor, and translator (died 1889)
- May 6 – Mary C. Ames, American writer (died 1884)
- June 7 – Amelia Edwards, English fiction writer and Egyptologist (died 1892)
- June 25 – Harriet Mann Miller, American author, naturalist, and ornithologist (died 1918)
- July 3 – Edmund Yates, Scottish writer (died 1894)
- July 5 – Cordelia A. Greene, American physician, reformer, benefactor (died 1905)
- July 7 – Jane Elizabeth Conklin, American religious writer and poet (died 1914)
- August 1 – William Aldis Wright, English writer and literary editor (died 1914)
- September 5 – Victorien Sardou, French dramatist (died 1908)
- September 12 – Álvares de Azevedo, Brazilian Ultra-Romantic writer (died 1852)
- October 7 – Eleanor Kirk, American writer (died 1908)
- October 15 – Helen Hunt Jackson, American poet, writer and activist (died 1885)
- October 19 – Fanny Murdaugh Downing, American author and poet (died 1894)
- unknown date – Nora Perry, American writer (died 1896)

== Deaths ==
- January 2 – Barthold Georg Niebuhr, Danish-born German historian (born 1776)
- January 14 – Henry Mackenzie, Scottish novelist (born 1745)
- January 21 – Ludwig Achim von Arnim, German poet and novelist (heart attack, born 1781)
- February 25 – Friedrich Maximilian Klinger, German dramatist and novelist, originator of Sturm und Drang (born 1752)
- April 4 – Isaiah Thomas, American publisher (born 1749)
- June 30 – William Roscoe, English poet (born 1753)
- September 12 – Jippensha Ikku (十返舎 一九), Japanese novelist and humorist (born 1765)
- October 2 – José Agostinho de Macedo, Portuguese poet (born 1761)
- December 18 – Willem Bilderdijk, Dutch author (born 1756)
- December 26 – Henry Louis Vivian Derozio, Indian poet and teacher (born 1809)

== Awards ==
- Chancellor's Gold Medal – George Stovin Venables
