= 1831 in the United Kingdom =

Events from the year 1831 in the United Kingdom.

== Incumbents ==
- Monarch – William IV
- Prime Minister – Charles Grey, 2nd Earl Grey (Whig)
- Foreign Secretary – Henry John Temple, 3rd Viscount Palmerston
- Home Secretary – William Lamb, 2nd Viscount Melbourne
- Secretary of War – Earl of Ripon

== Events ==
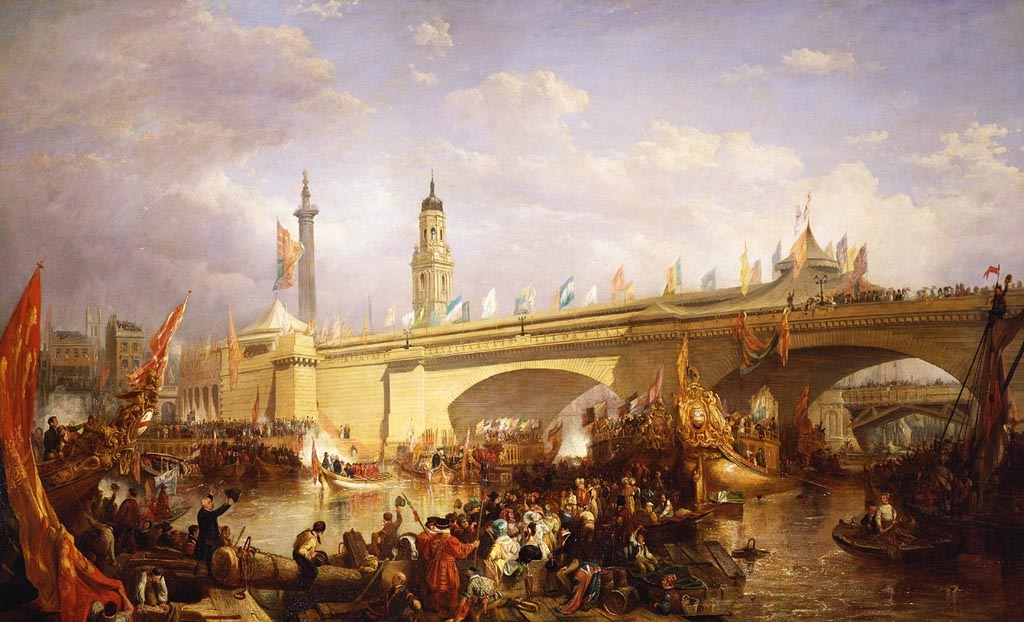
The Opening of New London Bridge by Clarkson Stanfield

- 3 March – Tithe War breaks out in Ireland.
- 7 March – Royal Astronomical Society receives its Royal Charter.
- 12 April – Broughton Suspension Bridge over the River Irwell collapses under marching troops.
- 27 April – End of the First Anglo-Ashanti War (1823–1831).
- 28 April–1 June – General election results in a Whig victory and a mandate for electoral reform.
- May–June – Merthyr Rising in Merthyr Tydfil.
- 23 May – Following an affray at Castlepollard Fair in Ireland, ten men and three women are shot dead by the Royal Irish Constabulary. Nineteen police officers stand trial for the incident but all are acquitted.
- 30 May – 1831 United Kingdom census.
- 1 June – Royal Navy officer and explorer James Clark Ross leads the first expedition to reach the Magnetic North Pole.
- 8 June – Freeminers in the Forest of Dean, led by Warren James, break down enclosures in the Forest.
- 1 August – The new London Bridge is officially opened.
- 18 August – The paddle steamer Rothsay Castle is wrecked at the eastern end of the Menai Strait with the loss of 93 lives.
- 29 August – Michael Faraday demonstrates electromagnetic induction.
- 8 September – Coronation of King William IV.
- 22 September – The House of Commons passes the Great Reform Bill to expand the franchise, but this is later defeated in the Lords.
- 27 September – British Association for the Advancement of Science first meets, in York.
- October – King's College London opens.
- 9–11 October – Reform riots in Nottingham: Nottingham Castle and a silk mill at Beeston are gutted by fire.
- 15 October
  - Special Constables Act regularises operation of the Special Constabulary.
  - Truck Act prohibits payment of wages other than in cash.
- 26 October – Cholera epidemic begins in Sunderland.
- 28 October – Michael Faraday constructs the first dynamo.
- 29–31 October – 1831 Bristol riots ("Queen Square riots") in Bristol, in connection with the Great Reform Act controversy: 100 city centre properties are destroyed (including the Bishop's palace), at least 120 are estimated to have been killed, 31 of the rioters will be sentenced to death and a colonel facing court-martial for failure to control the riot commits suicide.
- December – First meeting in England of the Plymouth Brethren, organised primarily by George Wigram, Benjamin Wills Newton and John Nelson Darby.
- 27 December – Charles Darwin embarks on his historic voyage aboard HMS Beagle from Plymouth.

=== Undated ===
- The house which will eventually contain Abbey Road Studios is built in the St John's Wood district of London.

== Publications ==
- January – Joseph Livesey begins publishing The Moral Reformer in Preston, Lancashire, the first publication of the temperance movement in England.
- Mrs Gore's novels Pin Money, Mothers and Daughters, and The Tuileries and her play The School for Coquettes.
- Thomas Hood's poem The Dream of Eugene Aram, the Murderer.
- Thomas Love Peacock's anonymous novel Crotchet Castle.
- Mary Prince's slave narrative The History of Mary Prince.

== Births ==
- 21 March – Dorothea Beale, proponent of women's education (died 1906)
- 7 May – Richard Norman Shaw, architect (died 1912)
- 16 May – David Edward Hughes, musician and professor of music (died 1900)
- 13 June – James Clerk Maxwell, physicist (died 1879)
- 14 October – Samuel Waite Johnson, railway locomotive engineer (died 1912)
- 15 October – Isabella Bird, explorer, writer, photographer and naturalist (died 1904)

== Deaths ==
- 14 February – Henry Maudslay, mechanical engineer (born 1771)
- 21 February – Robert Hall, Baptist minister (born 1764)
- 20 April – John Abernethy, surgeon (born 1764)
- 8 June – Sarah Siddons, actress (born 1755 in Wales)
- 17 August – Patrick Nasmyth, Scottish landscape painter (born 1787)
