= 1841 in the United Kingdom =

Events from the year 1841 in the United Kingdom.

== Incumbents ==
- Monarch – Victoria
- Prime Minister – William Lamb, 2nd Viscount Melbourne (Whig) (until 30 August); Robert Peel (Conservative) (starting 30 August)
- Foreign Secretary – Henry John Temple, 3rd Viscount Palmerston (until 2 September) George Hamilton-Gordon, 4th Earl of Aberdeen (starting 2 September)
- Home Secretary – Constantine Phipps, 1st Marquess of Normanby (until 30 August) Sir James Graham (from 6 September)

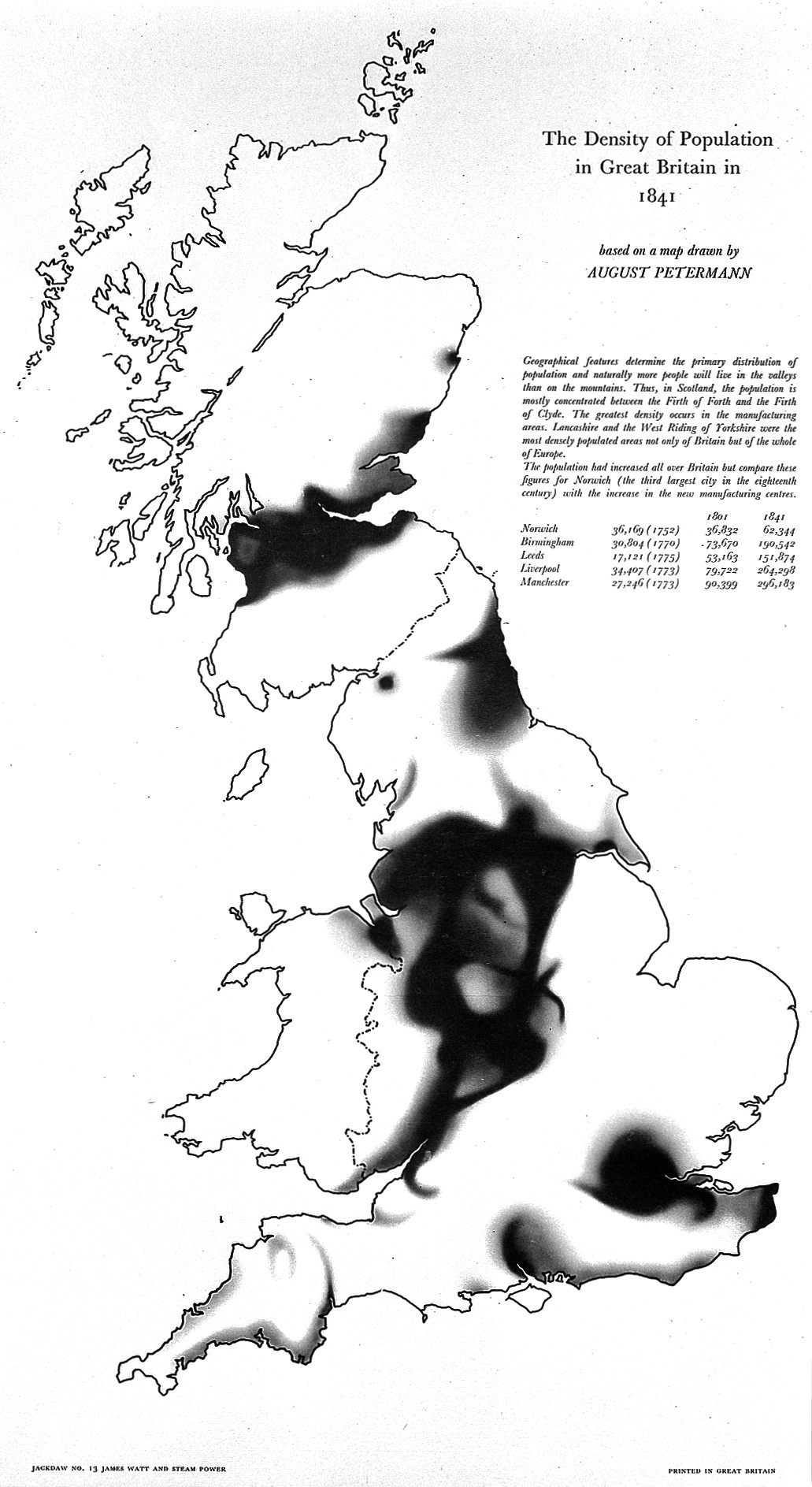
Density of the population of Great Britain in 1841

== Events ==
- 4 January – City of Dublin Steam Packet Company SS Thames is wrecked on the Western Rocks, Isles of Scilly, with the loss of 61 of the 65 on board; at least 20 other ships run aground round the British Isles today.
- 20 January – Convention of Chuenpi agreed between Charles Elliot and Qishan of the Qing dynasty.
- 26 January – The United Kingdom formally occupies Hong Kong.
- 27 January – The active volcano Mount Erebus in Antarctica is discovered and named by James Clark Ross.
- 28 January – Ross discovers the "Victoria Barrier", later known as the Ross Ice Shelf.
- February – H. Fox Talbot obtains a patent for the calotype process in photography.
- 10 February – Penny Red postage stamp replaces the Penny Black.
- 20 February – The Governor Fenner, carrying emigrants to America, sinks off Holyhead with the loss of 123 lives.
- March – Richard Beard opens England's first commercial photographic studio in London, producing daguerreotype portraits.
- 1 March – Opening throughout of the Manchester and Leeds Railway, the first to cross the Pennines.
- 4 March – First performance of Dion Boucicault's comedy London Assurance, presented by Charles Mathews at the Theatre Royal, Covent Garden.
- April – Royal Botanic Gardens, Kew first opens to the public and William Hooker appointed director.
- 3 May
  - New Zealand becomes a separate British colony, having previously been administered as part of the Colony of New South Wales.
  - London Library opens in Pall Mall.
- 6 June
  - United Kingdom Census held, the first to record names and approximate ages of every household member and to be administered nationally.
  - Marian Hughes becomes the first woman to take religious vows in communion with the Anglican Province of Canterbury since the Reformation, making them privately to E. B. Pusey in Oxford.
- 7 June – Lord Melbourne loses a vote of no confidence against his government.
- 21 June – St. Chad's Cathedral, Birmingham is dedicated as a Roman Catholic church.
- 29 June–22 July – General election, Sir Robert Peel's Conservatives take control of the House of Commons.
- 30 June – Great Western Railway completed throughout between London and Bristol.
- 5 July – Thomas Cook arranges his first excursion, taking 570 temperance campaigners on the Midland Counties Railway from Leicester to a rally in Loughborough.
- 17 July – The first edition of the humorous magazine Punch is published.
- 26 July – The proprietors of The Skerries Lighthouse off Anglesey, the last privately owned light in the British Isles, are awarded £444,984 in compensation for its sale to Trinity House.
- 28 August – Melbourne resigns as Prime Minister; replaced by Robert Peel.
- 2 September – Reconsecration of Leeds Parish Church after reconstruction.
- 21 September – The London and Brighton Railway is opened throughout.
- 24 September – The United Kingdom annexes Sarawak from Brunei; James Brooke is appointed rajah.
- 10 October – First Opium War: Battle of Chinhai – British capture a Chinese garrison.
- 13 October – First Opium War: British occupy Ningbo.
- 27 October – Anglican clergyman Richard Sibthorp becomes the first Tractarian to be received into the Roman Catholic Church, by Nicholas Wiseman at St Mary's College, Oscott (he reconverts two years later).
- 30 October – A fire at the Tower of London destroys its Grand Armoury and causes a quarter of a million pounds worth of damage.
- 9 November – Queen Victoria gives birth to her second child and first son, Albert Edward, the last British heir apparent to hold the title from birth.
- 13 November – Surgeon James Braid attends his first demonstration of animal magnetism, which leads to his study of the subject he eventually calls hypnotism.
- 23 December – First Anglo-Afghan War: at a meeting with the Afghan general Akbar Khan, the diplomat Sir William Hay Macnaghten is shot dead at close quarters.

=== Undated ===
- Antarctic explorer James Clark Ross additionally discovers the Ross Sea, Victoria Land and Mount Terror.
- Chemical Society of London founded by Thomas Graham.
- Whitelands College is established by the Church of England's National Society as a teacher training college for women in London, the first college of higher education in the UK to admit women.
- Ulster Canal completed.

=== Ongoing ===
- First Opium War (1839–1842)
- First Anglo-Afghan War (1839–1842)

== Publications ==
- W. Harrison Ainsworth's novel Old St. Paul's: A Tale of the Plague and the Fire (serialised in The Sunday Times, 3 January – 26 December).
- Thomas Carlyle's lectures On Heroes, Hero-Worship, and The Heroic in History.
- Serialisation of Charles Dickens's novel Barnaby Rudge: A Tale of the Riots of 'Eighty.
- Mrs Gore's novel Cecil, or Adventures of a Coxcomb.
- John Henry Newman's Tract 90 (Remarks on Certain Passages in the Thirty-Nine Articles, dated 25 January).
- Augustus Pugin's lectures The True Principles of Pointed or Christian Architecture.
- Samuel Warren's novel Ten Thousand a Year.
- Vocal Melodies of Scotland, containing the first publication of the song "The Bonnie Banks o' Loch Lomond".
- The Gardeners' Chronicle launched.
- The Jewish Chronicle launched; the first Jewish newspaper in the UK, it will be the oldest continuously published in the world when it ceases publication in 2020 (12 November).

== Births ==
- 25 January – Jackie Fisher, admiral (died 1920)
- 28 January – Henry Morton Stanley, explorer and journalist (died 1904)
- 9 November – King Edward VII (died 1910)
- William George Aston, consular official (died 1911)

== Deaths ==
- 2 February – Olinthus Gregory, mathematician (born 1774)
- 12 February – Astley Cooper, surgeon and anatomist (born 1768)
- 17 February – Joseph Chitty, lawyer and legal writer (born 1775)
- 22 April – Edward Draper, army officer and colonial administrator (born 1776)
- 20 May – Joseph Blanco White, theologian (born 1775)
- 1 June – Sir David Wilkie, Scottish painter (born 1785)
- 3 July – Rosemond Mountain, actress and singer (born 1780s?)
- 24 August – Theodore Hook, author (born 1788)
- 1 December – George Birkbeck, doctor, academic and philanthropist (born 1776)
- 23 December – Sir William Hay Macnaghten, Anglo-Indian diplomat (born 1793)
