= Popanilla =

1828 novel by Benjamin Disraeli

The Voyage of Captain Popanilla
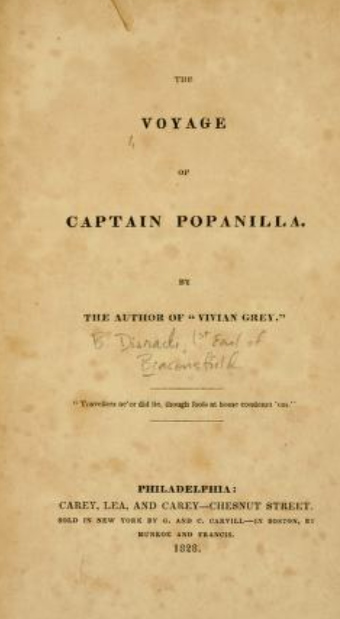
- Author: Benjamin Disraeli
- Language: English
- Genre: Menippean satire
- Publisher: Henry Colburn
- Publication date: 1828
- Media type: Print

The Voyage of Captain Popanilla is the second novel by Benjamin Disraeli, who later became a prime minister of the United Kingdom. Its allegory of a fantastic voyage is a satire on contemporary society.

== Background ==
Popanilla was published in 1828, a period of Disraeli's life described by one of his biographers as “almost a blank”. It had been submitted to the publisher John Murray four years earlier entitled "The Adventures of Mr. Aylmer Papillion" but was rejected. As an allegorical novella describing a fantastic voyage, it was influenced by Jonathan Swift's "Gulliver's Travels" and probably by works of Samuel Johnson and Voltaire.

== Synopsis ==
Fantaisie is an undiscovered remote and idyllic island in the Indian Ocean with mermaids and serpents. One day the indigenous people's sunset is disturbed by a ship, which they presume to be a sea monster, sinking. Popanilla is on the beach looking for the hair lock of his mistress which he has lost. He comes across a sea chest and investigates its contents, namely books.

After a spell in seclusion reading the books, Popanilla returns to his community and tries to convince the king and the assembly that they should develop as an island. They do not understand what he means and the king banishes him. However his ideas gain traction with the young men on the island, such that the king summons him back. Sarcastically the king says that he should seek what is required for the island's development and has him despatched on a canoe out in the ocean.

After 3 days on the ocean, Popanilla comes to a civilised island (Vraibleusia) where he is shown round its capital (Hubbabub) by Skindeep. He learns that, despite being the richest nation in the world, it is heavily in debt. Popanilla exchanges the gold he brought from Fantaisie for the island's currency, pink shells which, although readily available on the island's beach, can only be collected on pain of death, other than by the authorities. Skindeep is not able to answer the “Great Shell Question”, i.e. what would happen if everyone enacted their entitlement to convert their shells to gold. All the island's corn is supplied by the centuries-old “Aboriginal Inhabitant” since this has always been the case.

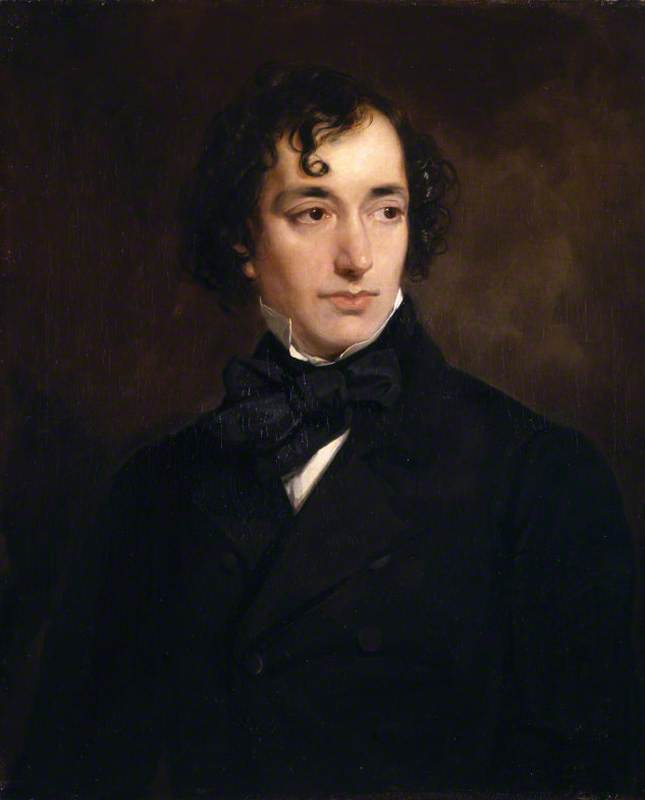
A retrospective portrayal (1852) of Disraeli as a young man when he wrote Popanilla

Popanilla is a star attraction of Vraibleusia and is proclaimed as the Ambassador for Fantaisie. He is invited to meet an ancient patched-up statue which can speak no wrong and is the ultimate power on the island, his decrees causing the stock market to ebb and flow. A massive fleet full of goods is prepared to set sail for Fantaisie. Vast quantities of pink shells are issued to finance the fleet, leading to a massive stock boom which creates a nouveau riche strata sadly lacking in manners.

Whilst the fleet is away, an island off the coast of Vraibleusia is spotted and Popanilla worries that he will be much less of a celebrity as a result. The island, however, turns out to be an uninhabited rock but the Vraibleusians colonise it nonetheless. Popanilla is then appointed to a role with horticultural responsibilities so reads a "chapter on fruit" which the novel includes.

The chapter explains that fruit on Vraibleusia was originally under the control of the "market gardener". Then the inhabitants discovered delicious pine-apples from a foreign country which over time came under the control of the "Prince of the World" who knew nothing of the market gardener. In order to protect domestic markets, imported pine-apples were banned and Vraibleusian ones produced instead. The problem was that they tasted disgusting and so this inspired demand for all sorts of other fruit, of which crab-apples were particularly prominent. This in turn inspired a backlash against the pine-apple producers. The statue was broken and its head fell off before some time later a "stout soldier" salvaged the head and ruled by its authority since he was the only person who could understand what it was saying. After the stout soldier's death, the head was rejoined to the body and the statue's patched-up mechanisms resumed working.

Vraibleusia plunges into economic depression and violence as a consequence of the fleet returning, having not found Fantaisie. Popanilla is arrested for high treason. After a spell in prison, Popanilla is tried for stealing 200 camelopards, which he has never seen in his life. It turns out this is a traditional charge as a precursor to the treason indictment even though camelopards have been long extinct on Vraibleusia. After various witnesses are unconvincing in their defence of Popanilla, by virtue of the intervention of a "remarkably able young man", the judge instructs the jury to acquit him which they do.

Popanilla resolves to emigrate and the novel ends with speculation on what may have happened to Popanilla's second voyage.

== Analysis and interpretation ==
Many of the characters and geographies in Popanilla represent people and places in Disraeli's contemporary society.

Vraibleusia represents England and its capital Hubbabub, London. The initials "SDK" which appear on the luggage Popanilla finds washed up on the shores of Fantaisie stand for "Society for the Diffusion of Useful Knowledge". The "remarkably able young man" who gets Popanilla acquitted at the end of the novel is Robert Peel. The statue is "Disraeli's ironic personification of the English monarchy". The "Aboriginal Inhabitant" is used as a vehicle for ridiculing the Corn Laws.

According to one critic, "[Popanilla] satirises ideas and institutions that the author would later champion". Disraeli's biographer Robert Blake wrote that Popanilla “takes off the more absurd extravagances of the Benthamites…It also laughs at the Corn Laws and the colonial system.”

=== Colonial system ===
Disraeli, who would go on to be Prime Minister of Great Britain when its empire approached its height, satirises the colonial system when Popanilla asks Skindeep about the governance of an uninhabited territory:

'Upon what system,' one day enquired [Popanilla] of his friend Skindeep, 'does your Government surround a small rock in the middle of the sea with fortifications, and cram it full of clerks, soldiers, lawyers and priests?'

'Why, really, your Excellency, I am the last man in the world to answer questions; but I believe we call it THE COLONIAL SYSTEM'.

=== Benthamism and Utilitarianism ===
The main target of Popanilla's satire is utilitarianism. Prior to discovering the knowledge of Benthamite theory brought to him by the shipwrecked books, Popanilla lives in a "state of nature" similar to paradise. Popanilla's advocacy of man being a "developing animal" is "a parody of utilitarianism". Popanilla observes all the features and absurdities of the highly developed Vraibleusia culminating in the economic ruin, depression and violence following the expeditionary fleet's failure but still maintains to one of its victims, Skindeep, that he (Skindeep) is happy because:

he might therefore still be a useful member of society; that, if he were useful, he must therefore be good; and that if he were good, he must therefore be happy; because happiness is the consequence of assisting the beneficial development of the ameliorating principles of the social action.

=== Religion ===
The chapter on fruit is a parody of English ecclesiastical history. Catholics are represented by the pineapple eaters, Puritans by the crab eaters and Anglicans by consumers of inferior pineapples whilst "the market gardener" is a reference to Christ (who was mistaken for a gardener by Mary Magdalene) and the Prince of the World the Pope.

=== Other themes ===
Critics have also suggested that the novel lampoons sexual licence, silver-fork novels of the sort Disraeli would later write, and stock market bubbles.

== Reception ==
Despite amusing both John Bright and Robert Plumer Ward, Popanilla "attracted little attention at the time or since".
