= The Tuileries (novel) =

1831 novel

- Author: Catherine Gore
- Language: English
- Genre: Silver Fork
- Publisher: Colburn and Bentley
- Publication date: 1831
- Publication place: United Kingdom
- Media type: Print

The Tuileries is an 1831 novel by the British writer Catherine Gore. A bestselling writer of silver fork novels, Gore turned in this to the recent history of Paris following the French Revolution and particularly the Tuileries Palace. Gore herself had a low opinion of the work and when her publisher Richard Bentley asked her to write a review of it she declined, observing it was "a very dull work" and that she "could find little to say in its favour" concluding that "the public must be more dense than I dare hope, if they can be persuaded that it is really a work of interest". It was one of two novels that Mary Shelley sent for in May 1831 along with Benjamin Disraeli's The Young Duke.

== Bibliography ==
- Adburgham, Alison. Silver Fork Society: Fashionable Life and Literature from 1814 to 1840. Faber & Faber, 2012.
- Garrett, Martin. A Mary Shelley Chronology. Springer, 2001.
- Gettman, Royal A. A Victorian Publisher: A Study of the Bentley Papers. Cambridge University Press, 10 Jun 2010.
- Rosa, Matthew Whiting. The Silver-fork School: Novels of Fashion Preceding Vanity Fair. Columbia University Press, 1936.
