= Tremaine (novel) =

1825 novel

- Author: Robert Plumer Ward
- Language: English
- Genre: Silver Fork
- Publisher: Henry Colburn
- Publication date: 1825
- Publication place: United Kingdom
- Media type: Print

Tremaine is an 1825 novel by the British writer Robert Plumer Ward. It was an early entry into the cycle of silver fork novels featuring fashionable British high society. It is also known by the alternative title Tremaine; or, the Man of Refinement. It was a major influence on Benjamin Disraeli's debut novel Vivian Grey published the following year.

== Synopsis ==
The novel takes place in 1811-12 during the early Regency era when the Whig Party had been disappointed when their hopes of taking over government had been dashed by the Prince Regent unsurprisingly keeping the rival Tories in office. In response Tremaine, a haughty young Whig travels to his estates in Yorkshire where he encounters his old friend and mentor Evelyn who tries to persuade him to drop his arrogance.

== Bibliography ==
- Adburgham, Alison. Silver Fork Society: Fashionable Life and Literature from 1814 to 1840. Faber & Faber, 2012.
- Copeland, Edward. The Silver Fork Novel: Fashionable Fiction in the Age of Reform. Cambridge University Press, 2012.
- Hibbert, Christopher. Disraeli: A Personal History. Harper Perennial, 2004.
