= Mrs. Armytage =

1836 novel

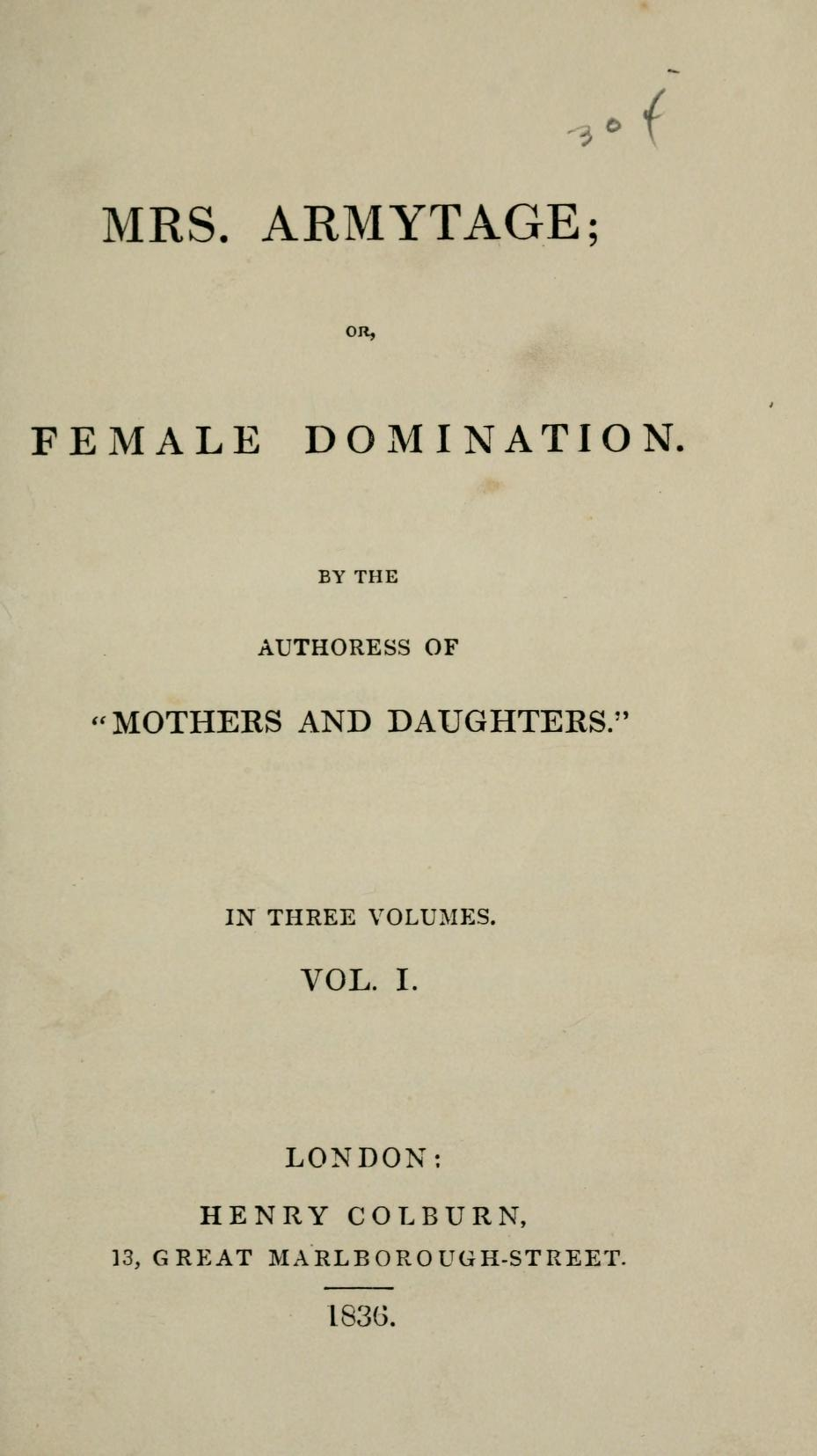
- Author: Catherine Gore
- Language: English
- Genre: Silver Fork
- Publisher: Henry Colburn
- Publication date: 1836
- Publication place: United Kingdom
- Media type: Print

Mrs. Armytage; or Female Domination is an 1836 novel by the British writer Catherine Gore, originally published in three volumes. It is a silver fork novel focusing on fashionable high society, a popular genre to which Gore contributed several books. The novel functions as an analogy for the contemporary political situation, with Gore advancing a pro-Whig viewpoint. It was very successful on its release, and was reissued by Gore's publisher Henry Colburn in 1848.

== Synopsis ==
At the country estate of Holywell Park the widowed Mrs. Armytage wields a heavy hand over her grown children Arthur and Sophy due to her financial control over them. Arthur rejects her influence, marrying without her permission, and then standing in a by-election and defeating his mother's favoured candidate. She drives her daughter to an early grave, after concealing a marriage proposal from her beloved, sees her son bankrupted without offering any assistance and plays a part in ruining her daughter-in-law's reputation. However, it is discovered that a codicil to her husband's will has no legal validity, and in thank all his father's property really belongs to Arthur. Mrs. Armytage then leaves for the Continent, but finally returns very ill for a final reconciliation with her son and his wife.

== Bibliography ==
- Adburgham, Alison. Silver Fork Society: Fashionable Life and Literature from 1814 to 1840. Faber & Faber, 2012.
- Copeland, Edward. The Silver Fork Novel: Fashionable Fiction in the Age of Reform. Cambridge University Press, 2012. Ohio State University Press, 1994.
- Rosa, Matthew Whiting. The Silver-fork School: Novels of Fashion Preceding Vanity Fair. Columbia University Press, 1936.
- Sutherland, John. The Stanford Companion to Victorian Fiction. Stanford University Press, 1989.
- Wilson, Cheryl A. Fashioning the Silver Fork Novel. Routledge, 2015.
