= Women as They Are =

1830 novel

- Author: Catherine Gore
- Language: English
- Genre: Silver Fork
- Publisher: Henry Colburn
- Publication date: 1830
- Publication place: United Kingdom
- Media type: Print

Illustration from first edition of the novel.

Women as They Are is an 1830 novel by the British writer Catherine Gore, originally published in three volumes. It is part of the silver fork novels, which focus on fashionable high society in the later Regency era. It is also known by its subtitle The Manners of the Day. It was her first novel published by Henry Colburn, and was a considerable success. George IV described it as "the best bred and most amusing novel in my remembrance".

== Bibliography ==
- Adburgham, Alison. Silver Fork Society: Fashionable Life and Literature from 1814 to 1840. Faber & Faber, 2012.
- Copeland, Edward. The Silver Fork Novel: Fashionable Fiction in the Age of Reform. Cambridge University Press, 2012. Ohio State University Press, 1994.
- Rosa, Matthew Whiting. The Silver-fork School: Novels of Fashion Preceding Vanity Fair. Columbia University Press, 1936.
- Sutherland, John. The Stanford Companion to Victorian Fiction. Stanford University Press, 1989.
- Wilson, Cheryl A. Fashioning the Silver Fork Novel. Routledge, 2015.
