= Quid pro quo (disambiguation) =

Quid pro quo is a Latin term meaning "something for something".

Quid pro quo may also refer to:

- Quid Pro Quo (play), an 1844 play by Catherine Gore
- Quid Pro Quo (film), a 2008 film
- Quid Pro Quo (album), a 2011 album by English rock band Status Quo
- Quid Pro Quo, an album by Australian musician Brett Garsed
- Quid Pro Quo, an album by German medieval rock band In Extremo
- "Quid Pro Quo" (Constantine), an episode of the American television series Constantine
- "Quid Pro Quo", a season 2 episode of Hacks
- "Quid Pro Quo" (Terriers), an episode of the American television series Terriers
- Quid Pro Quo (trotter), Swedish trotter

== See also ==
- "There was no quid pro quo", a phrase employed by Donald Trump in reference to the Trump–Ukraine scandal
