= Henrietta Temple =

1837 novel by Benjamin Disraeli

Henrietta Temple A Love Story
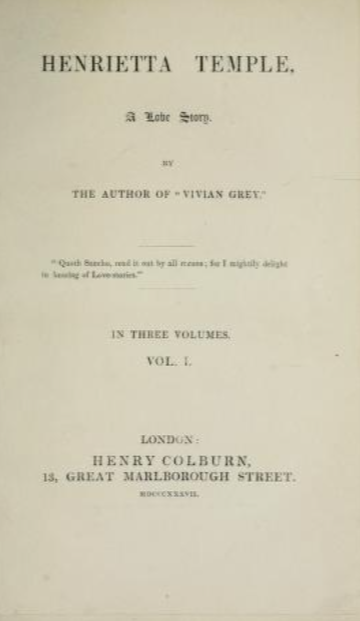
- Title page for Henrietta Temple (1837)
- Author: Benjamin Disraeli
- Language: English
- Genre: Silver fork novel
- Publisher: Henry Colburn
- Publication date: 1837
- Media type: Print

Henrietta Temple is the ninth novel written by Benjamin Disraeli, who would later become a Prime Minister of Britain.

== Background ==
Disraeli wrote the first volume of Henrietta Temple in 1833 at the start of his affair with Henrietta Sykes, on whom the novel’s eponymous heroine is based, and completed it three years later, shortly after the affair had ended. The two volumes reflect these two stages of the relationship, the first with, "the rustle of real petticoats [being] more audible than in any other part of Disraeli's work," the latter where, "passion has vanished". The novel was written at a time when Disraeli was heavily in debt (ca £1m in today’s terms) and its limited success helped ease Disraeli’s financial situation.

== Synopsis ==
Ferdinand Armine is the scion of an aristocratic Catholic family, which can trace its roots back to the time of William the Conqueror. Ferdinand had an idyllic but isolated childhood, brought up by his loving parents and his tutor Glastonbury. The family estate, Armine, is, however, dilapidated and debt-ridden due to the lifestyle of Ferdinand’s grandfather. Ferdinand becomes a favourite of his wealthy maternal grandfather, Lord Grandison, who, despite hints, fails to financially assist his daughter and son-in-law. Glastonbury therefore arranges for a duke in London, whose family he previously served, to buy an army commission in Malta for Ferdinand. Whilst Ferdinand is in Malta, Lord Grandison’s heir dies and everyone assumes Ferdinand will in due course inherit Grandison’s estate. Ferdinand therefore builds up large debts living an extravagant lifestyle but, when Grandison dies, his estate is bequeathed to his granddaughter, Katherine. On returning to England, Ferdinand realises the only way to deal with his debt is to marry Katherine, his cousin.

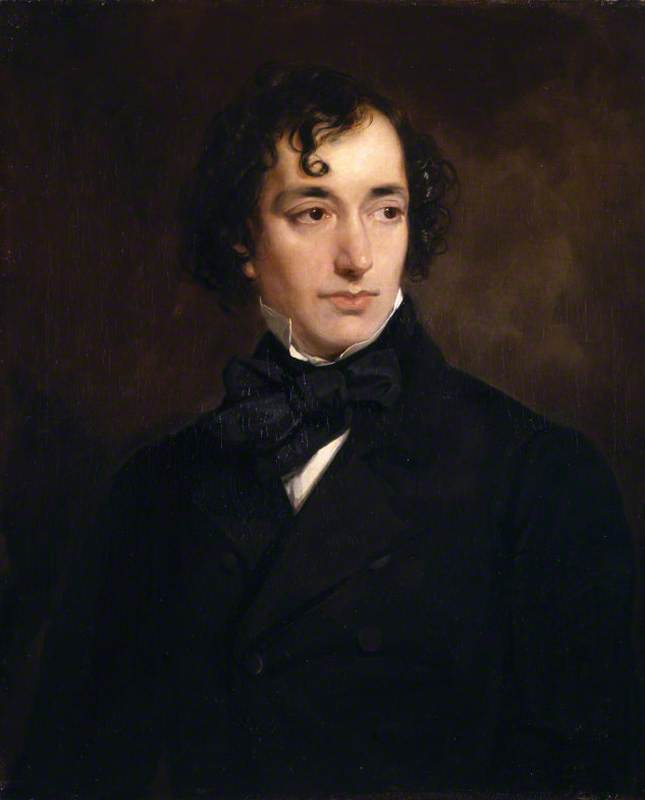
A retrospective portrayal (1852) of Disraeli as a young man when he wrote Henrietta Temple

Ferdinand successfully woos Katherine who accepts his proposal of marriage. Ruminating on the sadness of his predicament, he meets Henrietta Temple and her father, the tenant of the neighbouring estate. Ferdinand and Henrietta instantly fall in love. In the coming days and weeks, with both their families away, the couple spend more time together and enter into a secret engagement.

Ferdinand concludes that he should break his engagement with Katherine and persuades Henrietta to keep their engagement secret until he has squared things with his own father. Ferdinand therefore sets off to Bath to explain what has happened to his family. He and Henrietta exchange secret letters but Ferdinand’s become progressively more infrequent and briefer. Henrietta hears of Ferdinand’s engagement to Katherine through a family friend, Lady Bellair. Distraught, she reveals her love for Ferdinand to her father and they resolve to go to Italy.

Shortly afterwards Ferdinand, having failed to tell his family about Henrietta, returns and, learning that Henrietta has left the country and has knowledge of his engagement to Katherine, falls gravely ill. His parents, Glastonbury and Katherine help nurse him back to health, whereupon Ferdinand confirms to Katherine what Glastonbury had previously told her, namely that he is in love with someone else. Ferdinand and Katherine resolve to secretly break their engagement but to remain friends.

Meanwhile in Italy, Henrietta is also ill and reclusive but is gradually brought round by Lord Montfort, the grandson of the (now deceased) duke who arranged the army commission for Ferdinand. Montfort proposes and, mainly to make her father happy, Henrietta accepts. Montfort decides that they should return to London for their wedding. Coincidentally Mr Temple is the beneficiary of an unexpected inheritance and decides to settle it on Henrietta thus making her the richest heiress in the country.

In London Ferdinand and Henrietta meet through mutual friends and chance encounters and learn how unhappy the other is. Katherine also realises Henrietta is Ferdinand’s first love and challenges both Henrietta and Lord Montfort on the subject. Henrietta and Ferdinand both separately disclose their feelings to their fathers, who react negatively. News of the termination of Ferdinand's engagement to Katherine reaches one of his creditors, who arranges for Ferdinand to be arrested and taken to a “spunging hole”, a sort of pre-debtor prison.

Various friends visit Ferdinand but he refuses help. Eventually Montfort turns up and presents him with a note written by Henrietta which states that Montfort and Katherine are to wed, thus freeing Ferdinand to marry Henrietta. Ferdinand is delighted and the following day allows a friend to pay off his debt. With all the main characters happily reconciled, the novel ends describing how Montfort and Ferdinand went on to become Whig MPs and how Ferdinand and Henrietta happily raised their four children at the former’s family home, now restored to its former splendour.

== Themes ==
According to its author, the main theme of the novel is love at first sight, as described when Ferdinand first sets eyes on Henrietta.

There is no love but love at first sight. This is the transcendent and surpassing offspring of sheer and unpolluted sympathy. All other is the illegitimate result of observation, of reflection, of compromise, of comparison, of expediency. The passions that endure flash like the lightning: they scorch the soul, but it is warmed for ever.

Disraeli also writes that, "the magic of first love is our ignorance that it can ever end,” but the novel contains additional themes common to his other work such as a character (Glastonbury) mirroring “his own wiser alter ego”, a key scene being set in a ruined abbey and artificially life-like art.

The novel's hero escapes debt by a combination of marrying into a wealthy family and entering Parliament, both of which Disraeli was to do in the 3 years following the novel’s publication.

== Reception ==
The novel was generally well received at the time of its publication. Lord Tennyson described it as a “charming little story” and Beverley Tucker, writing of Disraeli, "that there is no writer of novels now living whose powers are estimated so highly by the best judges among us," describes the novel as a, "striking example of the versatility of his genius." The novel had a resurgence in popularity when Disraeli took centre stage at the 1878 Congress of Berlin.

More recent reviews have been mixed. In 1968, Richard Levine wrote, “In the final analysis, however, [Henrietta Temple] is neither typical nor meaningful in Disraeli’s canon; for it carries within it few ideas or authorial observations, and Disraeli’s fundamental interests for us are as a novelist of ideas and as a writer of personal involvement and observation.” Eleven years later Daniel Schwarz rebutted Levine's opinions on the grounds that the novel has “thematic interest and aesthetic appeal apart from Disraeli’s ideas” and that it is “hardly impersonal.”
