= Flirtation (novel) =

1827 novel

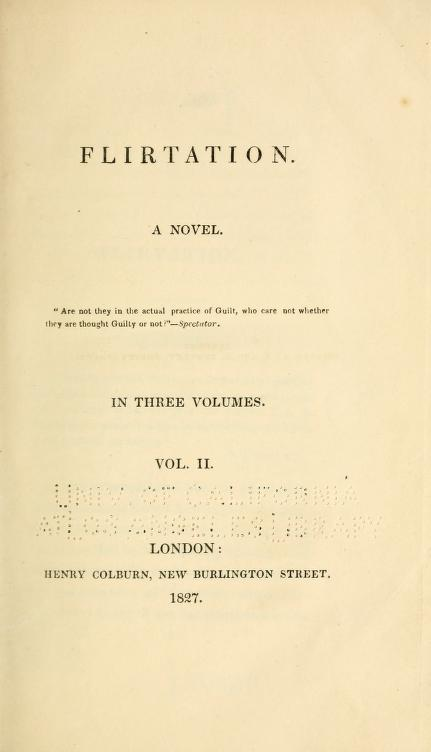
- Author: Lady Charlotte Bury
- Language: English
- Genre: Silver Fork
- Publisher: Henry Colburn
- Publication date: 1827
- Publication place: United Kingdom
- Media type: Print

Flirtation is an 1827 novel by the British writer Lady Charlotte Bury, originally published in three volumes. Bury, writing anonymously, was a well-known author of silver fork novels set in high society. It was a popular success and quickly ran through three editions.

== Synopsis ==
The novel focuses on two sisters Lady Frances and Lady Emily. Frances is a reckless flirt who after marrying a wealthy man, loses his love by openly flirting with another man at the opera leading to a downward spiral of seduction, debts and a miserable death. Flirtation has a negative effect on several working-class characters including Rose Devlin, a country girl who is seduced by a squire and ends up as a London prostitute before being found by Lady Emily. Meanwhile, Rosalinda an Italian heiress mistakes Lord Mowbray's polite gallantry for an infatuation, and follows him to London losing her inheritance and ending up as an opera singer in the capital and dies heart-broken in Pimlico. Only Lady Emily manages to avoid these tragic pitfalls by her avoidance of flirtation, and is eventually happily married to Lord Mowbray.

== Bibliography ==
- Adburgham, Alison. Silver Fork Society: Fashionable Life and Literature from 1814 to 1840. Faber & Faber, 2012.
- Copeland, Edward. The Silver Fork Novel: Fashionable Fiction in the Age of Reform. Cambridge University Press, 2012.
- Rosa, Matthew Whiting. The Silver-fork School: Novels of Fashion Preceding Vanity Fair. Columbia University Press, 1936.
