= Arlington (novel) =

1832 novel

- Author: Thomas Henry Lister
- Language: English
- Genre: Silver Fork
- Publisher: Henry Colburn
- Publication date: 1832
- Publication place: United Kingdom
- Media type: Print

Arlington is an 1832 novel by the British writer Thomas Henry Lister. It was originally published in three volumes in London by Henry Colburn. It was also released in New York City by the publishing house Harper. The book was part of the tradition of Silver Forks, then at the height of their popularity, that focused on the lives of the upper-classes of late Regency Britain. It was written when the dispute over the Reform Act was dominating political matters, and is referred to in the plot.

== Bibliography ==
- Copeland, Edward. The Silver Fork Novel: Fashionable Fiction in the Age of Reform. Cambridge University Press, 2012.
- Hodson, Jane (ed.) Dialect and Literature in the Long Nineteenth Century. : Taylor & Francis, 2017.
- Philpotts, Trey. The Companion to Little Dorrit. Helm, 2003.
