= The Opera (novel) =

1832 novel

- Author: Catherine Gore
- Language: English
- Genre: Silver Fork
- Publisher: Colburn and Bentley
- Publication date: 1832
- Publication place: United Kingdom
- Media type: Print

The Opera is an 1832 novel by the British writer Catherine Gore, originally published in three volumes. It is part of the tradition of silver fork novels focusing on British high society of the later Regency era. One contemporary reviewer launched a critical attack on its elitism, and lack of realism about everyday lives. The novel makes many references to the ongoing debate about the Reform Bill.

== Bibliography ==
- Adburgham, Alison. Silver Fork Society: Fashionable Life and Literature from 1814 to 1840. Faber & Faber, 2012.
- Copeland, Edward. The Silver Fork Novel: Fashionable Fiction in the Age of Reform. Cambridge University Press, 2012. Ohio State University Press, 1994.
- Murphy, Paul Thomas. Toward a Working-class Canon: Literary Criticism in British Working-class Periodicals, 1816-1858.
- Parker, Roger & Rutherford, Susan. London Voices, 1820–1840: Vocal Performers, Practices, Histories. University of Chicago Press, 2019.
- Rosa, Matthew Whiting. The Silver-fork School: Novels of Fashion Preceding Vanity Fair. Columbia University Press, 1936.
- Wilson, Cheryl A. Fashioning the Silver Fork Novel. Routledge, 2015.
