= The Cabinet Minister (novel) =

1839 novel

- Author: Catherine Gore
- Language: English
- Genre: Silver Fork
- Publisher: Richard Bentley
- Publication date: 1839
- Publication place: United Kingdom
- Media type: Print

The Cabinet Minister is an 1839 novel by the British writer Catherine Gore, originally published in three volumes. It is part of the tradition of silver fork novels popular during the era which focus on the upper-classes, and part of a subset of books which focus on British politics. It follows events in the Whig movement from the Regency Crisis of 1810 through the Great Reform Act in 1832 to the present in the early years of Queen Victoria's reign.

== Synopsis ==
The widow of Sir Gideon Woodbridge, takes in his two young relatives Bessy and Frank to live at her country estate along with her son Sir Henry. A staunch Tory she is upset when at university at Christ Church, Oxford the two men are won over to the Whig party and the cause of reform. Frank pursues a political career, but having become entangled with a fashionable Tory woman he briefly deserts the Whig movement. Ultimately he returns to the Whig movement and becomes a cabinet minister and is knighted by William IV. His sister, meanwhile, turns down an offer of marriage from the wealthy but arrogant Tory politician Lord Warkworthy and eventually marries her cousin Sir Henry.

== Bibliography ==
- Adburgham, Alison. Silver Fork Society: Fashionable Life and Literature from 1814 to 1840. Faber & Faber, 2012.
- Colby, Vineta. Yesterday's Woman: Domestic Realism in the English Novel. Princeton University Press, 2015.
- Copeland, Edward. The Silver Fork Novel: Fashionable Fiction in the Age of Reform. Cambridge University Press, 2012.
- Rosa, Matthew Whiting. The Silver-fork School: Novels of Fashion Preceding Vanity Fair. Columbia University Press, 1936.
- Wilson, Cheryl A. Fashioning the Silver Fork Novel. Routledge, 6 Oct 2015.
