= The Ambassador's Wife (Gore novel) =

1842 novel

- Author: Catherine Gore
- Language: English
- Genre: Silver Fork
- Publisher: Richard Bentley
- Publication date: 1842
- Publication place: United Kingdom
- Media type: Print

The Ambassador's Wife is an 1842 novel by the British writer Catherine Gore. It was part of the fashionable Silver fork novel genre, of which Gore was a leading contributor. Gore drew on her own experiences having attended the salons of Paris for the novel. It blends elements of international politics and high society. According to the magazine John Bull the novel "quickly became the paramount topic of conversation in all polite circles".

== Bibliography ==
- Davey, Jennifer. Mary, Countess of Derby, and the Politics of Victorian Britain. Oxford University Press, 2019.
- Jay, Elisabeth. British Writers and Paris: 1830-1875. Oxford University Press, 2016.
