= The Fair of Mayfair =

1832 novel

- Author: Catherine Gore
- Language: English
- Genre: Silver Fork
- Publisher: Henry Colburn
- Publication date: 1832
- Publication place: United Kingdom
- Media type: Print

The Fair of Mayfair is an 1832 collection of short stories written by the British author Catherine Gore, published in three volumes. It features six novellas which focus on fashionable London High society while siding with middle class critics of the aristocracy. It was part of the genre of Silver fork novels which had gained great popularity during the later Regency era.

== Bibliography ==
- Adburgham, Alison. Silver Fork Society: Fashionable Life and Literature from 1814 to 1840. Faber & Faber, 2012.
- Ashton, Rosemary. Victorian Bloomsbury. Yale University Press, 2012.
- Copeland, Edward. The Silver Fork Novel: Fashionable Fiction in the Age of Reform. Cambridge University Press, 2012. Ohio State University Press, 1994.
