= Quid Pro Quo (play) =

1844 play

- Original language: English
- Written by: Catherine Gore
- Genre: Comedy
- Setting: England, Present day

Premiere
- Date: 18 June 1844
- Place: Theatre Royal, Haymarket, London

Quid Pro Quo is an 1844 comedy play by the British writer Catherine Gore, best known for her novels. It premiered at the Theatre Royal, Haymarket in London on 18 June 1844. The original cast included Louisa Cranstoun Nisbett as Lord Bellamont, Robert Strickland as Jeremy Grigson, John Buckstone as Captain Sippet, William Farren as Sir George Mordent, Henry Howe as Rivers, Julia Bennett as Lady Mary Rivers, Julia Glover as Mrs. Grigson, Mrs. Edwin Yarnold as Ellen and Anne Humby as Bridget Prim. The prologue was spoken by Benjamin Webster. The play was selected in a competition by a special committee led by Charles Kemble out of ninety six entries, for which Gore was rewarded with £500.

== Bibliography ==
- Donohue, Joseph Walter. The Cambridge History of British Theatre, Volume 2. Cambridge University Press, 2004.
- Franceschina, John (ed.) Gore On Stage: The Plays of Catherine Gore. Routledge, 2004.
- Nicoll, Allardyce. A History of Early Nineteenth Century Drama 1800-1850. Cambridge University Press, 1930.
