= A Year at Hartlebury =

1834 novel

- Title page of first edition, using the pseudonyms of the authors
- Author: Benjamin Disraeli; Sarah Disraeli
- Language: English
- Genre: Silver Fork
- Publisher: Saunders and Otley
- Publication date: 1834
- Publication place: United Kingdom
- Media type: Print

A Year at Hartlebury is an 1834 novel co-authored by the British writer and future Prime Minister Benjamin Disraeli and his sister Sarah Disraeli. Part of the silver fork tradition of novels, it was released in two volumes under a pseudonym by the London publishing house Saunders and Otley. It was only in 1979 that the Disraeli siblings were formally identified as the author, and it bears strong similarities to Benjamin's views when he contested the 1832 general election for Wycombe. The full title is A Year at Hartlebury, Or, The Election. It doesn't take its name from the village Hartlebury in Worcestershire, but from a fictional location Hartlebury Manor loosely inspired by Bradenham Manor in Buckinghamshire where he grew up.

== Bibliography ==
- Hawkins, Ann (ed.) The Early Novels of Benjamin Disraeli. Taylor & Francis, 2024.
- O'Kell, Robert P. Disraeli: The Romance of Politics. University of Toronto Press, 2014.
