= Anne Humby =

English actress

- Born: Anne Ayre; London, England, United Kingdom
- Died: 1863
- Occupations: Actress; Singer
- Years active: 1817-1849

Anne Humby (born Anne Ayre) (flourished 1817–1863) was a British actress and singer frequently called "Mrs Humby".

== Early career and time in Bath (1817-1820) ==
She studied under Domenico Corri. She debuted in Rosina in Kingston upon Hull. She married a man with the surname Humby. He was a dentist. The two married during her debut season. Next, Humby performed in Bath, Somerset, on 4 November 1818. She played Rosetta in Love in a Village. Between 1818 and 1819 she played Euphrosyne in Comus. Luciana in The Comedy of Errors, Araminta in Young Quaker, Audrey in As You Like It, Dorinda in an adaptation of The Tempest.

== Dublin and London (1820-1830) ==
Humby left Bath in 1820 to relocate to Dublin by 1821. She had a child by her husband. On 5 January 1822 she performed as Rosa in Rendezvous. On 29 January the same year she performed as Lucy in The Beggar's Opera. On 18 April 1825 she played Cowslip in The Agreeable Surprise. That same year, she also played Dollalolla in Tom Thumb, Maud in Peeping Tom, Jenny in The Provoked Husband, and Cicely in The Heir at Law. She moved to London and performed at the Haymarket Theatre and at Theatre Royal, Drury Lane. She became popular for her performance as maids. This includes playing the maid Patch in Busy Body and Kitty in High Life Below Stairs. She was described, by The Dramatic Magazine, as being a quality maid or hatmaker, but, lacking "refined and delicate manners" needed for other roles.

== Later life ==
In 1837, William Macready committed to employ her at over six pounds a week but a dispute with another actor made her withdraw. Humby was still performing in the 1840s and in 1849, she was performing at the Lyceum Theatre. Her husband practiced dentistry in the Strand neighborhood of London. He died in Guernsey. Humby eventually married Joseph Hammond and they settled in Barnes in London. She is thought to have died on 29 September 1863.
