= Pin Money =

1831 novel

- Author: Catherine Gore
- Language: English
- Genre: Silver Fork
- Publisher: Henry Colburn
- Publication date: 1831
- Publication place: United Kingdom
- Media type: Print

Pin Money is an 1831 novel by the British writer Catherine Gore, originally published in three volumes. It was part of the group of silver fork novels published during the later Regency era that focuses on life in the fashionable British upper classes. The Westminster Review considered the male characters to be more skilfully drawn than the female. Another review suggested that there was too much product placement in the novel, advertising the goods of various London shops.

("Pin money" is an allowance given to a wife or dependant for personal use, or personal petty cash.)

== Bibliography ==
- Adburgham, Alison. Silver Fork Society: Fashionable Life and Literature from 1814 to 1840. Faber & Faber, 2012.
- Copeland, Edward. The Silver Fork Novel: Fashionable Fiction in the Age of Reform. Cambridge University Press, 2012.
- Rosa, Matthew Whiting. The Silver-fork School: Novels of Fashion Preceding Vanity Fair. Columbia University Press, 1936.
- Wilson, Cheryl A. Fashioning the Silver Fork Novel. Routledge, 6 Oct 2015.
