= Jane Elizabeth Conklin =

American journalist

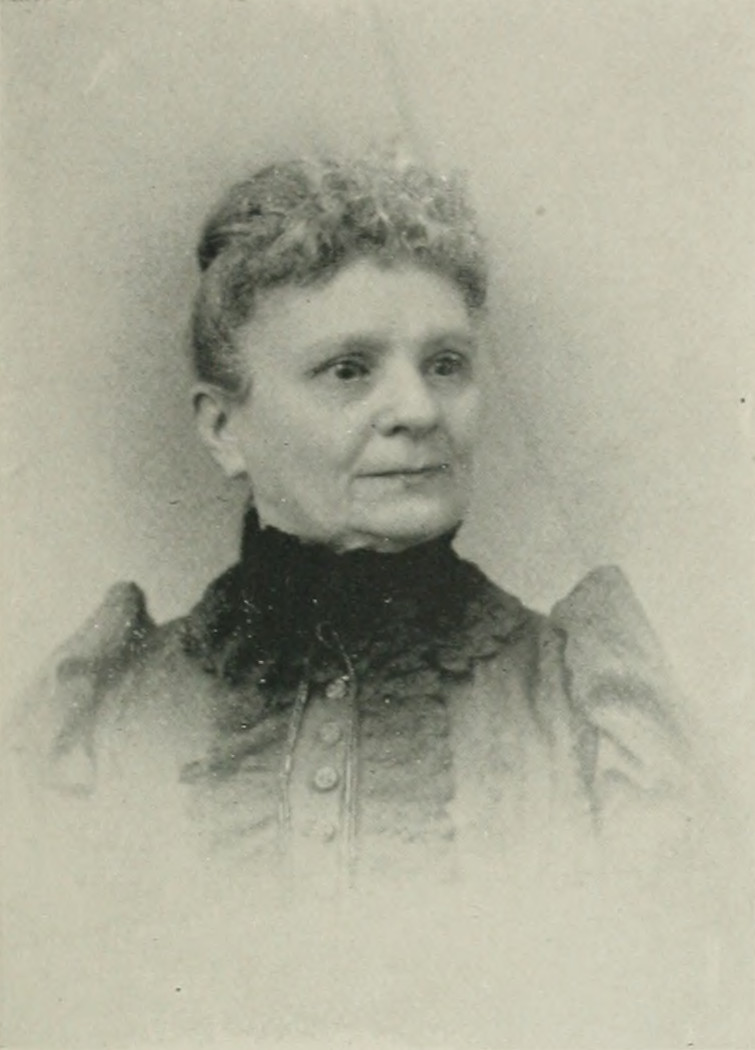
- Photo in A Woman of the Century
- Born: Jane Elizabeth Dexter; July 7, 1831; Utica, New York, U.S.
- Died: December 19, 1914 (aged 83); Utica, New York, U.S.
- Education: Utica Female Academy, Mrs. Brinkerhof's School for Young Ladies
- Occupations: Poet, religious writer, elocutionist
- Spouse: Cramer H. Conklin

Jane Elizabeth Conklin (née, Dexter; July 7, 1831 – 19 December 1914) was an American poet and religious writer of the long nineteenth century from New York. For three years, she served as president of the Woman's Relief Corps of the Grand Army of the Republic. She enjoyed a reputation as an elocutionist; and was the author of three volumes of poetry. She was born and died in Utica, New York.

== Biography ==
Jane Elizabeth Dexter was born in Utica, New York. Her great-grandfather, Gregor (or George) Grant), chieftain of Clan Grant, from Abernethy, Scotland, came to the United States in 1774. He joined the Continental Army and served during the American Revolutionary War. Dexter's mother was the daughter of William W. Williams, an architect of Albany, New York. Conklin's father was born in Paris, New York, his parents having removed to that town from Mansfield, Connecticut in the latter part of the 18th century.

Conklin received her education in the Utica Female Academy and in Mrs. Brinkerhof's School for Young Ladies in Albany. Her first composition was written in verse. When she was 14 years old, her poems were first published, and after that time, she wrote continuously.

While none of Conklin's poems were strictly hymns, many of them were sung in religious meetings. She was, for many years, a contributor to the Utica Gospel Messenger. She also wrote prose and poetry for a New York City weekly, and for several local papers. In 1884, she published a book of poems, which was favorably received. In 1897, she was preparing a second volume of poems, ultimately publishing three books of poetry in total. Conklin was also remembered as an elocutionist.

In December, 1865, she married Cramer H. Conklin, a veteran of the American Civil War, and they subsequently lived in Binghamton, New York. Conklin took great interest in the American Civil War and in the defenders of the Republic.

When the Grand Army of the Republic post to which her husband belonged formed a Relief Corps of wives and daughters, she was one of the first to sign a call for a charter. Shortly after the Corps was organized, she was elected its president, and for three years, she held that office.

Jane Elizabeth Conklin died at her home in Utica on December 19, 1914.

== Selected works ==
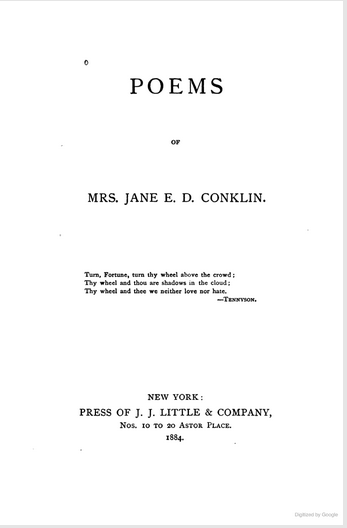
"Poems of Jane E.D. Conklin"

- 1884, Poems of Jane E.D. Conklin] (Text)
