= Cecil (novel) =

1841 novel

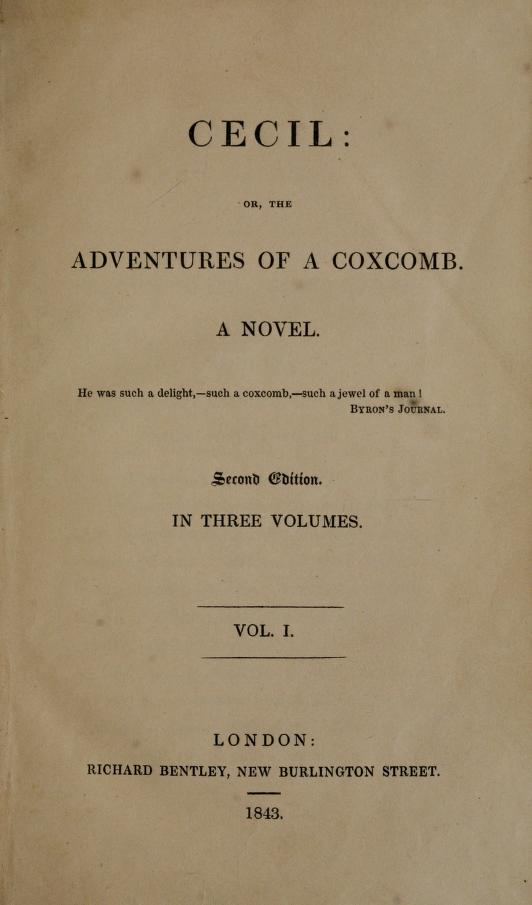
- Author: Catherine Gore
- Language: English
- Genre: Silver Fork
- Publisher: Richard Bentley
- Publication date: 1841
- Publication place: United Kingdom
- Media type: Print

Cecil, or Adventures of a Coxcomb is an 1841 novel by the British writer Catherine Gore, originally published in three volumes by Richard Bentley. It is part of the tradition of Silver Fork novels, which had enjoyed great success in the 1820s and 1830s but was coming to an end by the early Victorian era. It offers a retrospective look at the Regency era through the eyes of Cecil, a dandy who lived through it in high society. It was followed by a sequel Cecil, a Peer published the same year.

== Bibliography ==
- Copeland, Edward. The Silver Fork Novel: Fashionable Fiction in the Age of Reform. Cambridge University Press, 2012. Ohio State University Press, 1994.
- Gillingham, Lauren. Fashionable Fictions and the Currency of the Nineteenth-Century British Novel. Cambridge University Press, 2023.
- Sutherland, John. The Stanford Companion to Victorian Fiction. Stanford University Press, 1989.
