= Newton Forster =

1832 novel by Frederick Marryat

- Macmillan, 1898
- Author: Frederick Marryat
- Language: English
- Genre: Adventure
- Publisher: James Cochrane
- Publication date: 1832
- Publication place: United Kingdom
- Media type: Print

Newton Forster or, the Merchant Service is an 1832 novel by the British writer Frederick Marryat. Like much of Marryat's work it is a seafaring novel about a young man impressed into the Royal Navy during the Napoleonic Wars. He is subsequently imprisoned by the French, shipwrecked in the West Indies and makes a success in trading in the East Indies.

Marryat was a supporter of the West Indian pro-slavery lobby. Responding to contemporary threats of the Jamaican planters to secede from the British Empire, following London's move towards abolition, and join with the United States then considered more sympathetic to slavery, Marryat wrote that the inhabitants would "not flinch and the island of the Caribbean will be inrolled [sic] as another star, and add another stripe to the independent flag, which is their natural protector".

== Bibliography ==
- Taylor, Michael. The Interest: How the British Establishment Resisted the Abolition of Slavery. Random House, 2020.
