= The Young Duke =

1831 novel by Benjamin Disraeli

The Young Duke - a moral tale, though gay
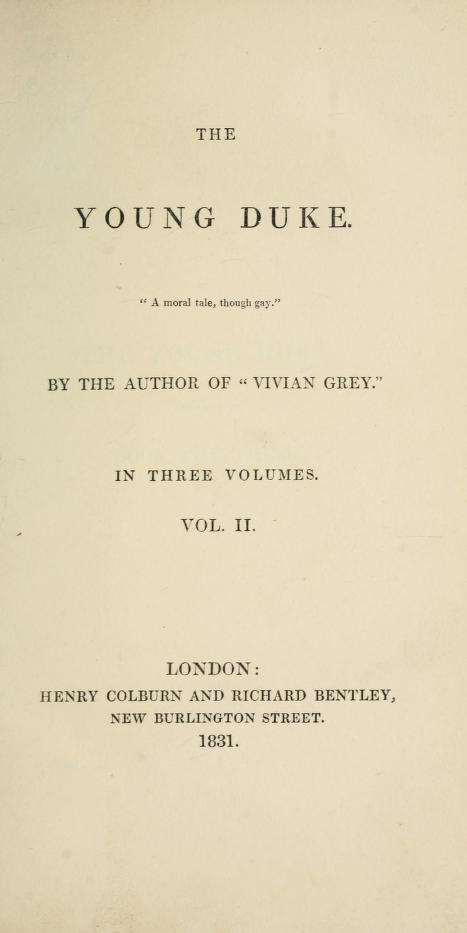
- Author: Benjamin Disraeli
- Language: English
- Genre: Silver fork novel
- Publisher: Henry Colburn
- Publication date: 1831
- Media type: Print

The Young Duke - a moral tale, though gay is the third novel written by Benjamin Disraeli who would later become Prime Minister of the United Kingdom. Despite its moderate success, Disraeli came to dislike the novel which was a hindrance to his political career.

== Background ==
Disraeli started writing The Young Duke in late 1829, completing it in March 1830, as a means to finance his upcoming Grand Tour.

== Synopsis ==
The infant George Augustus Frederick succeeds to the wealthy dukedom of St James on the death of his father, whose sister's husband (Earl Fitz-pompey) expects to be ward of the young duke. Instead George is entrusted to a neighbour, Mr Dacre, a Catholic. Over time Fitz-pompey dazzles George with his glamorous aristocratic lifestyle such that George eventually moves in permanently to the earl's household when Dacre leaves the country on account of the health of his wife. The earl lines up his youngest daughter (Caroline) to be George's bride and over time is increasingly critical of Dacre.

George returns from his Grand Tour conceited and distant. He enters society and is very popular, meeting and falling in love with Lady Aphrodite Grafton, who is in a loveless marriage with Lord Lucius Grafton. On hearing Dacre has returned to England, George makes a token effort towards his former guardian by sending one of his servants, masquerading as the duke, to visit on a day he knows Dacre and his family will not be home.

As a consequence of the machinations of Fitz-pompey, George sees less of Lady Aphrodite and comes round to the idea of marrying Caroline until he meets a beautiful young lady, who turns out to be Dacre's daughter, May. May is disdainful of George, realising the truth of the faked visit years earlier since George in no way resembles the man her servants described as having visited her father.

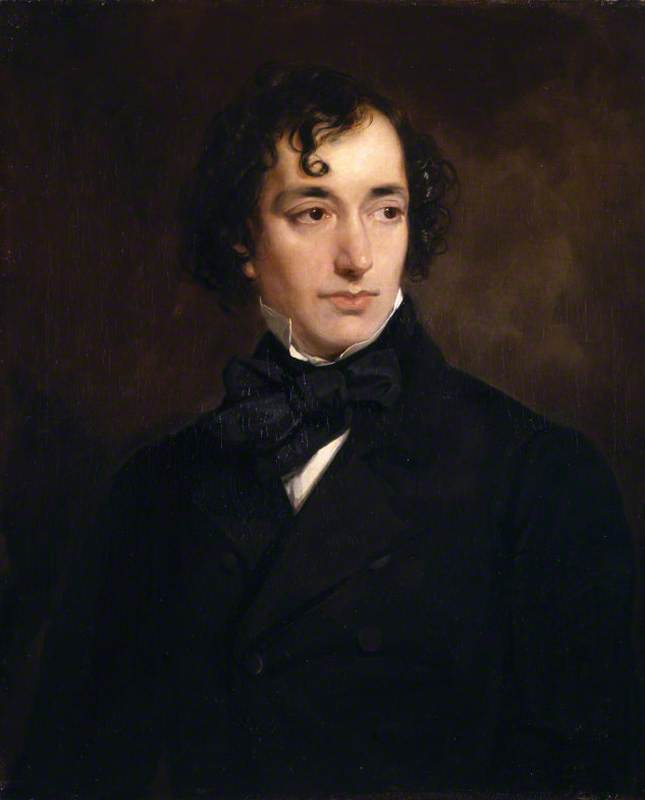
A retrospective portrayal (1852) of Disraeli as a young man when he wrote The Young Duke

Seeing George's affection for May, Mrs Dallington Vere (a friend of May) and Lucius Grafton hatch a plot to line up Lady Aphrodite with the young duke, since Lucius wants to be shot of his wife. They perceive May as a threat to their plans and, aware that May is reputed to be romantically involved with her cousin Arundel, endeavour to keep George and May apart. George declares his love to May but she rejects him on account of his character and treatment of her father. The young duke seeks solace in a ruined abbey and resolves to remove himself from May's social circle, and gets involved in the racing set, with whom he is very popular.

Although their plot is going to plan, Mrs Dallington Vere reveals to Lucius that she can no longer continue with it since she has fallen for Arundel, whereupon Lucius reveals he is in love with May. Shortly afterwards the young duke and his friends organise a party with a wide invitation list. Walking in the garden at the party, George takes pity on Aphrodite and proposes. Shortly afterwards he hears a shriek and finds Lucius on bended knee in front of a horrified May. George announces himself as May's "protector" and hurriedly gets her on a coach home. Lucius challenges George to a duel and they resolve not to tell anyone of its cause.

Neither party is seriously injured in the duel and the participants decide to let the rumour spread that the dispute was over an opera singer ("The Bird of Paradise"). Relieved by the duel of his commitment to Lady Aphrodite, George once again proposes to May who rejects him again but this time far more respectfully and affectionately.

Depressed, George retreats to his Cornish estate where he receives news from his bankers that his finances are in dire straits. He meets his bankers in London before retreating to Brighton where he adds to his financial woes by losing £100k in a few nights’ gambling. He returns to London and, shortly after learning that both the Bird of Paradise and Lady Aphrodite have eloped with two of his gambling acquaintances, he writes to Mr Dacre requesting his help in resolving his financial predicament. Mr Dacre accepts and before going to stay with him, George, expecting that he will be obliged to emigrate, has an emotional farewell with Caroline.

Staying with Mr Dacre, George once again spends time with May. He is saddened when he comes across her and Arundel in an intense discussion, arriving at the conclusion that Arundel will only propose if he wins a seat in Parliament. At a forthcoming election, George induces Caroline's brother to stand down in favour of Arundel whose passage to Parliament is secured.

As an MP, Arundel is instrumental in getting the Roman Catholic Relief Bill passed by the House of Commons. George resolves to secretly go to London to take his seat in the House of Lords where, despite his brilliant speech, the bill is defeated. In Parliament he meets Arundel who entrusts him with an important letter for Mr Dacre which George presumes to be a request for his daughter's hand in marriage.

On arrival back at Dacre's estate, George is greeted as a hero. Mr Dacre opens the letter and, without revealing its contents, says that he and May should discuss it later. May and George then go for a walk in the ruined abbey and this time May accepts George's proposal of marriage. On their return to the house, Mr Dacre happily endorses the union and also sets out a plan for resolving George's financial problems.

George conveys the news of his engagement by letter to Fitz-pompey, whose reply discloses the engagement of Arundel to Caroline. In subsequent correspondence Fitz-pompey reveals that Lady Aphrodite has thwarted Lucius's demands for divorce by producing the letters between her husband and Mrs Dallington Vere, exposing their plotting. Arundel challenges Lucius to a duel and shoots him in the leg such that it has to be amputated. Mrs Dallington Vere is forced to the leave the country, whilst relatives of her deceased husband contest her entitlements under the terms of his will.

The novel ends 4 years later with the Duke and Duchess of St James living happily with their two young children and Arundel being a much celebrated politician.

== Reception ==
Disraeli's father, the novelist Isaac D'Israeli, expressed surprise at his son's choice of subject matter for the novel exclaiming, ‘The Young Duke! What does Ben know of dukes?’ Disraeli had reservations about the book and considered scrapping it. Nevertheless, it was published and, despite a negative review in The Quarterly Review, was both well received and reasonably successful, yielding its author £500. Over time, however, Disraeli's reservations grew such that he subsequently "bowdlerised" it for the 1853 edition, in an advertisement for which he wrote that, "Young authors are apt to fall into affectation and conceit, and the writer sinned very much in this respect."

A review of the 1866 edition appearing in The Spectator concludes that although "we know of no more successful writer" and that The Young Duke contains "a gleam of true power" (i.e. the gambling scenes) the general level is "infinitely below - conceited, trivial, supercilious, dull."

Modern reviews are slightly less damning. Disraeli's biographer, Robert Blake, writes of the novel that, "It is indeed an enjoyable book despite all its absurdities of manner and diction...and [its] improbable plot...The style is artificial, full of far-fetched witticisms, convoluted antitheses, elaborate epigrams."

== Quotes and politics ==
The Young Duke contains content critical of features of its author's future lifestyle, thus hindering Disraeli's subsequent political career. Ironically, one of these was the concept of a Grand Tour ("The travelling career of the young Duke may be conceived by those who have wasted their time, and are compensated for that silliness by being Men of the World"), which, in Disraeli's case, was to be financed by the proceeds from the book. Disraeli is also critical of aristocratic dinner parties and the people who attend them.

The Young Duke is also the first of Disraeli's novels to include comment on politicians of the day such as Robert Peel, Lord Grey and the Duke of Wellington. Such sections were more prominent in Disraeli's novels at the peak of his literary career in the 1840s.

To the extent that the novel contains political opinion, it comprises its sympathetic treatment of the Catholic Emancipation movement and the view that the English aristocracy needs to be rejuvenated by its younger members so as to effectively discharge its leading role in the government of the country.
