= The School for Coquettes =

1831 play

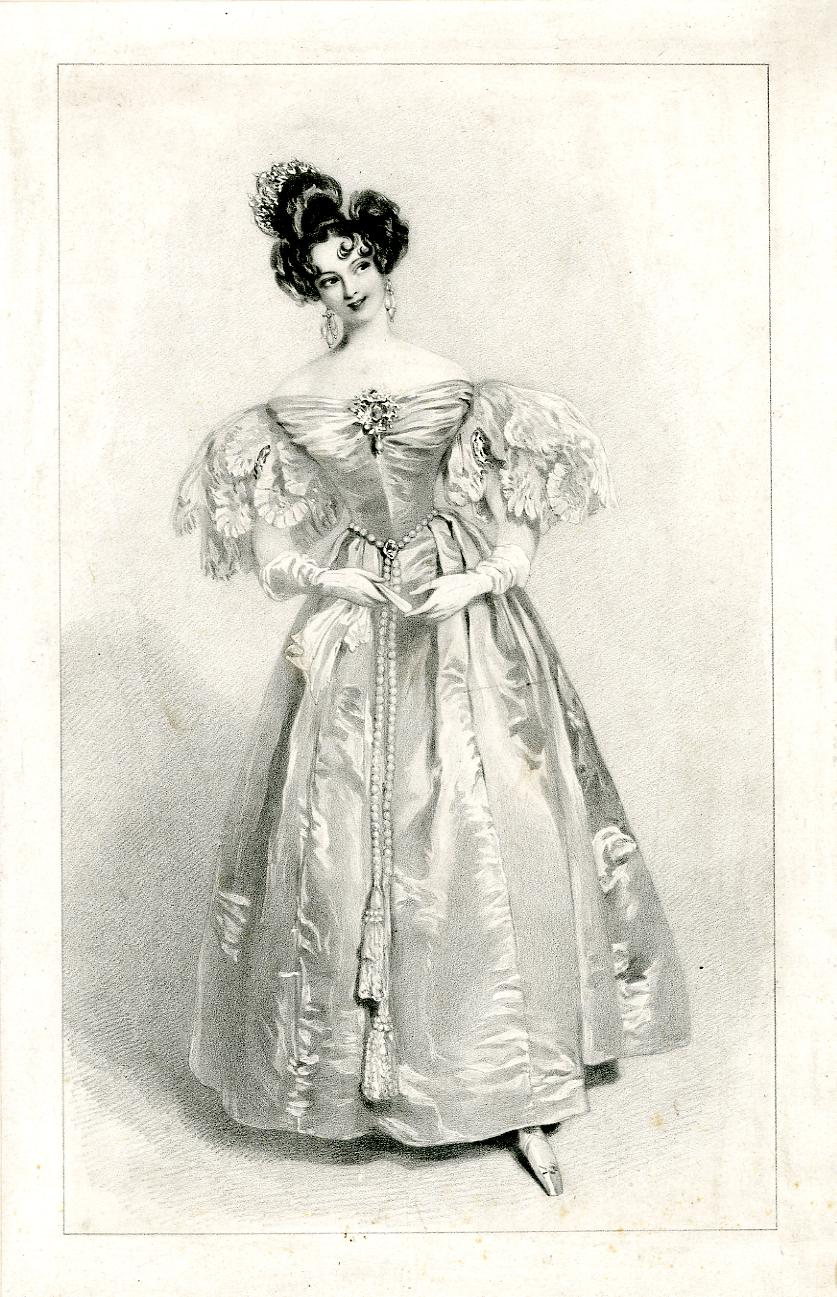
- Harriette Taylor as Lady Howard.
- Original language: English
- Written by: Catherine Gore
- Genre: Comedy
- Setting: England, Present day

Premiere
- Date: 14 July 1831
- Place: Theatre Royal, Haymarket, London

The School for Coquettes is an 1831 comedy play by the British writer Catherine Gore, best known for her silver fork novels, for whom it was her theatrical debut. It premiered at the Theatre Royal, Haymarket in London on 14 July 1831. The original cast included John Cooper as Lord Marston, William Farren as General Lumley, Frederick Vining as Frederick Lumley, Henry John Wallack as Howard, Benjamin Nottingham Webster as Ralph, Julia Glover as Lady Hampton and Harriette Taylor as Lady Honoria Howard. The play was a great success, running for 37 performances and being revived the following year.

== Bibliography ==
- Franceschina, John (ed.) Gore On Stage: The Plays of Catherine Gore. Routledge, 2004.
- Nicoll, Allardyce. A History of Early Nineteenth Century Drama 1800-1850. Cambridge University Press, 1930.
