= Emily Lucas Blackall =

American author and philanthropist

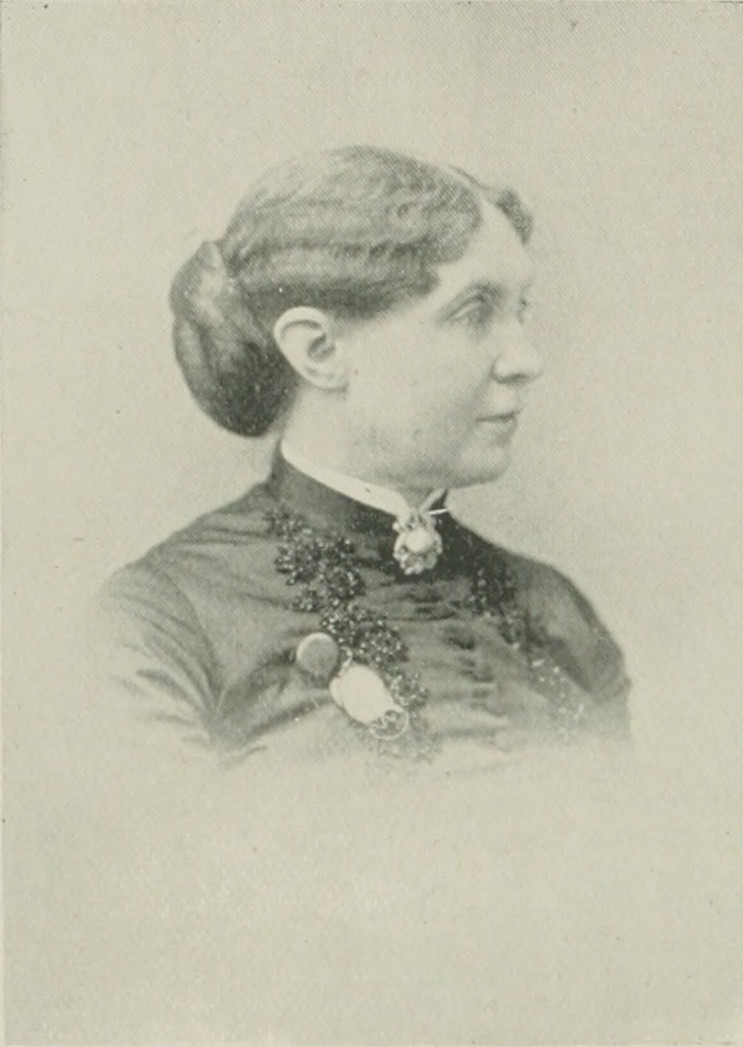
- Photo in A Woman of the Century
- Born: Emily Lucas; June 30, 1832; Salem, Indiana, U.S.
- Died: March 28, 1892 (aged 59); New York City, New York, U.S.
- Resting place: Cottage Grove Cemetery
- Occupations: author, philanthropist
- Spouse: Christopher Rubey Blackall (m. 1873)
- Writing career
- Language: English

Emily Lucas Blackall (née, Lucas; June 30, 1832 - March 28, 1892) was a 19th-century American author and philanthropist. Her first published book was Superior to Circumstances, which was followed by Melodies from Nature, and Won and Not One. She also contributed short stories and biographical sketches to various periodicals, and was a frequent contributor to missionary literature. She became identified with the woman's temperance crusade and aided in forming the Woman's Christian Temperance Union.

== Early life and education ==
Emily Lucas was born in Salem, Indiana, June 30, 1832. The first ten years of her life were spent in her birthplace. Her early school days were marked by a quickness of apprehension and an appreciative literary taste that gave indication of the life that was to be in later years. Her parents were Virginians of English descent.

== Career ==
During a considerable period, including the years of the American Civil War, Blackall's residence was in Louisville, Kentucky, where she was identified with the Baptist Orphans' Home from its beginning until she left the State. She was also treasurer of the Kentucky branch of the Woman's Missionary Society. Removing to Chicago, she became identified with the woman's temperance crusade and aided in forming the WCTU. She was one of a committee of women who appealed in person to the city council to restrain the liquor-saloon influence, and one of a special committee of three appointed to visit the mayor and urge him to carry out a plan for the protection of homes against the saloon. She was one of the founders of the Woman's Baptist Foreign Missionary Society of the West, and was treasurer of that organization until she left Chicago. She was largely instrumental in the formation of the Women's Baptist Home Mission Society, located in Chicago, with which she was actively engaged at the time of her death. In 1882, she became a resident of Philadelphia, Pennsylvania, where she was identified with various benevolent enterprises. A member of the Philadelphia Women's Council, a member of the Women's International Congress in 1887, and a delegate to the Woman's National Council in 1891, she showed a depth of sympathy and touch with progressive ideas that proved the breadth of her character and her influence. She was an able presiding officer and public speaker.

As an author she was successful. Her publications included Superior to Circumstances (Boston, 1889), Melodies from Nature (Boston, 1889), and Won and Not One (J. B. Lippincott Co., Philadelphia, 1891). Her short stories and biographies appeared in various periodicals, and she frequently contributed missionary literature. In collaboration with her husband, the Rev. Christopher Rubey Blackall, she was joint author of Stories about Jesus (Philadelphia, 1890). She dealt with social and economic problems in a practical, common-sense manner, writing from experience and broad observation in a literary style marked by purity, vigor and correctness.

In Won and not one, the two leading characters are Protestants belonging to different denominations, each having profound convictions. The story illustrates the unhappiness that may spring from such a union. "Melodies from nature", harmonized by William Wordsworth, and arranged by Blackall, was a collection of some of Wordsworth's poems, illustrated with photogravures, as a memorial of the poet and of England's lake country. Superior To Circumstances, described as being original in plot and treatment, was based upon Kingsley's expression that any man or woman, in any age, and under any circumstances, "who will, can live the heroic life and exercise heroic influences." The character of Margaret Strong was developed by the troubles through which she passed. Among these, she is falsely accused of the theft of a diamond necklace. The "conversation lessons" are characterized as a clever idea. The author was said to have, "a strong bias toward what is miscalled temperance, and meant by prohibition of spirituous and vinous liquors.

== Personal life ==
Blackall married Christopher Rubey Blackall (born 1830) in 1873. He studied medicine and served as an assistant surgeon early during the American Civil War, but abandoned medicine in 1864. He was ordained to Christian ministry in 1880, and also worked as a newspaper editor.

She died in New York City, on March 28, 1892.

== Selected works ==
- 1882, Two weeks among Indians, and glimpses of work in their behalf
- 1889, Superior to circumstances
- 1889, Melodies from Nature
- 1890, Stories about Jesus, our Lord and Saviour: His wonderful words and works, with 389 pictorial illustrations (with C. R. Blackall)
- 1891, Won and not one
