= Valentine (novel) =

1832 novel by George Sand

Valentine (1832) is a novel published by French author George Sand. This was the second novel published in Sand's career as an independent author, the novel is notable for displaying many of Sand's preoccupations as an emerging novelist: love, social class, greed, liberty, and family ties. Like many of Sand's novels, the novel takes its name from its title character Valentine, who is born into an aristocratic family but falls in love with the peasant farmer, Benedict. Star-crossed lovers belonging to different social classes were to become a major theme in Sand's works, which interrogated what the author perceived as the hypocrisy and rigidity of social norms in the Restoration-period French republic.

== Themes ==
Sand's main theme in the novel is marriage. Marriages of convenience are expected in the novel. Évariste de Lansac, Valentine's fiancé, is a greedy character who pursues marriage for land and wealth. However, while marriage between Valentine and Benedict would be based on genuine love, it is also forbidden by their class differences. The snobbery of the upper class is embodied by Valentine's grandmother.

The novel depicts the limited education given to women in the 1830s. Having completed a basic education in preparation for her marriage, Valentine complains she is "miserable." She is able to draw, sing, and dance, but does not have knowledge of the world beyond what would prepare her for a domestic life as a wife.

Valentine's sister, Louise, represents a rebellious alternative. Louise becomes entangled romantically with Benedict. Benedict is then in love with both sisters. The novel offers no solutions for these social problems, but simply allows them to unfold.

The novel's fictional backdrop is shared by many of Sand's later rustic novels, the Black Valley in the Berri region. These novels are based on the region where Sand had her own country estate.

== Reception ==
In the Revue de Romans, an 1839 reviewer of the novel noted Sand's unique use of the romance genre.

"Valentine is the work of a woman author who depicts in this novel, and with unexpected vigor for this often-silly genre of writing, the trials and tribulations of a woman whom society has condemned to waste away her days in a place whether neither the people nor their ages are varied, and neither love nor affection are easily obtained; in short, it is a hyperbolic critique of the institution of marriage, but it is a charming work of great interest and poetry."

(Translated from the French, Source: http://fr.wikisource.org/wiki/Revue_des_Romans/George_Sand)
