= Nora Perry (writer) =

American poet (1831–1896)

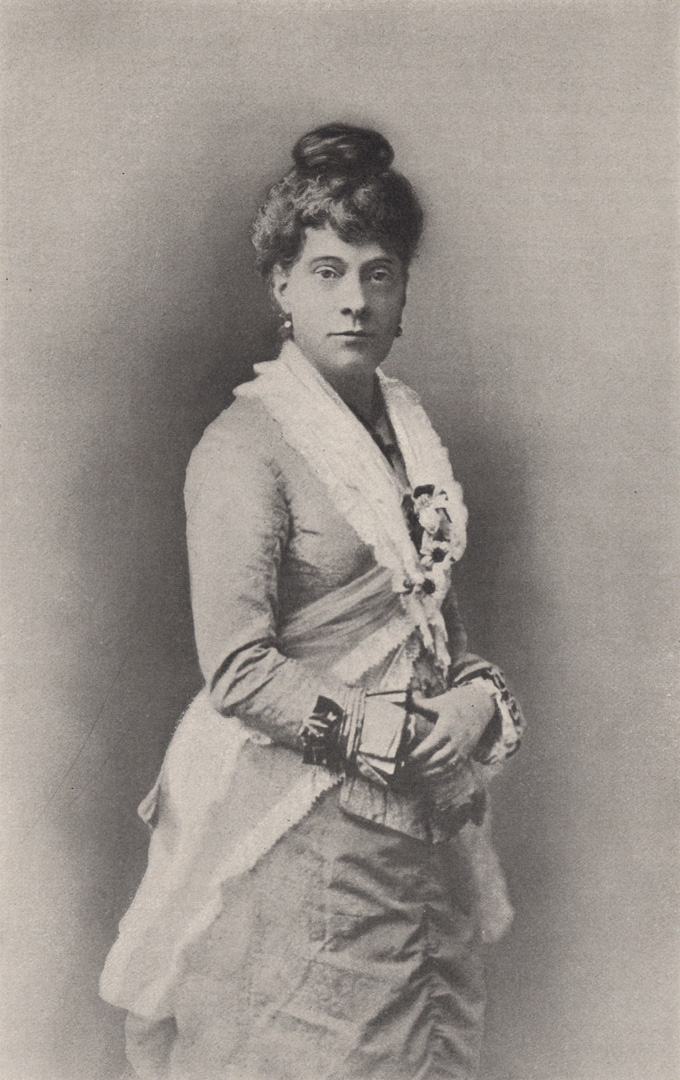
- Born: 1831; Dudley, Massachusetts, U.S.
- Died: May 13, 1896 (aged 64-65); Dudley
- Resting place: Swan Point Cemetery, Providence, Rhode Island, U.S.
- Occupation: Author
- Writing career
- Language: English
- Notable work: "After the Ball"

Signature
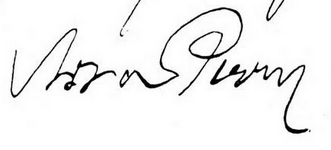

Nora Perry (1831 – May 13, 1896) was an American poet, newspaper correspondent, and writer of juvenile stories, and for some years, Boston correspondent of the Chicago Tribune. Her verse was collected in After the Ball (1875), Her Lover's Friend (1879), New Songs and Ballads (1886), Legends and Lyrics (1890). Her fiction, chiefly juvenile, included The Tragedy of the Unexpected (1880), stories; For a Woman (1885), a novel; A Book of Love Stories (1881); A Flock of Girls and their Friends (1887); The New Year's Call (1903); and many other volumes.

== Early years and education ==
Nora Perry was born in Dudley, Massachusetts, (Note: Providence, Rhode Island is also mentioned as place of birth.) in 1831. (Note: 1832 and 1841 are also mentioned as year of birth.) Her parents removed to Providence, Rhode Island, in her childhood. Her father was engaged in mercantile business there. She was educated at home and in private schools. She received a varied and liberal training in many lines. Her first piece, "The Shipwreck" was written when Perry was eight years old.

== Career ==
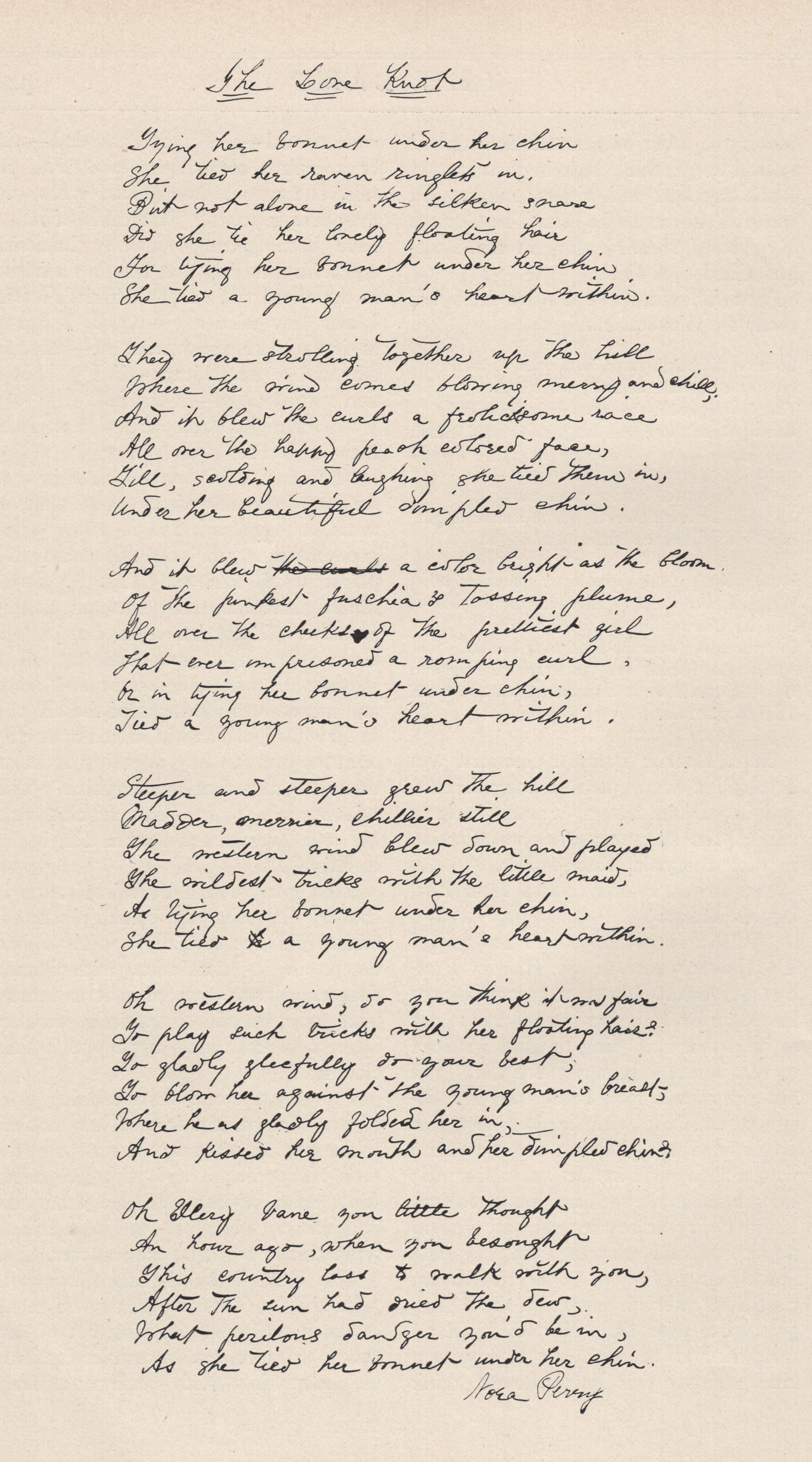
"The Love Knot" (also known as "Tying Her Bonnet under Her Chin")

At the age of eighteen, she began to write for publication as a newspaper correspondent. Her first serial story, "Rosalind Newcomb", was published in Harper's Magazine in 1859–60. Much of her time in later years was spent in Boston, where she wrote society letters for the Chicago Tribune and also became Boston correspondent to the most influential paper in Rhode Island, the Providence Journal. In 1859, there appeared in the Boston and other papers, printed, reprinted, copied one from the other, a touching poem called "After the Ball". Ever since its first appearance in its fugitive state, the name of Nora Perry became familiar to readers. "After the Ball" (1859, Atlantic Monthly) and "Tying Her Bonnet under Her Chin" (1859, National Era) were Perry's best poems of the 1850s. By the mid-1860s, she favored penning stories for girls.

"After the Ball", which was sometimes printed under the title of "Madge and Maud", was afterwards incorporated in a book with other poems, published in Boston in 1874, but the many verses that Perry wrote since that time, never faded from the memory of her readers the picture of the two maidens, who,—

"Sat and combed their beautiful hair
After the revel was done."

At intervals, she was in the habit of collecting her magazine contributions and issuing them in book form, such as are often classed as "summer reading". In this shape appeared in 1880 The Tragedy of the Unexpected and Other Stories, which actually was not a tragedy, but a pleasant summer idyl. In 1881 followed a Book of Love Stories, the very title of which endeared it to all the youthful readers wanting "something new" that did not require too much thought. In 1885, she published the novelette For a Woman; in 1886, a volume of New Songs and Ballads; and in 1887, A Flock of Girls. In New Songs and Ballads (1886), there were several poems of high literary merit, though none held the sympathies of its readers as completely as "After the Ball"; among the best of these were "Her Lover's Friend", "Lady Wentworth", and a piece entitled "The Maid of Honor".

Her verse is collected in After the Ball (1875), Her Lover's Friend (1879), New Songs and Ballads (1886), Legends and Lyrics (1890). Her fiction, chiefly juvenile, includes The Tragedy of the Unexpected (1880), stories; For a Woman (1885), a novel; A Book of Love Stories (1881); A Flock of Girls and their Friends (1887); The New Year's Call (1903); Youngest Miss Lorton, and Other Stories (1889), Brave Girls (1889), and many other volumes. These were briskly told and, like her verses, appealed to the sentiment of the broader reading public.

== Personal life ==
Perry was a friend of Sarah Helen Whitman. Perry died at Dudley on May 13, 1896.

== Style and themes ==
Although her writing was amenable to even the most prudish reader, Perry abstained from any obvious moral purpose in her stories. Nevertheless, her work was of the moral order, and showed high thinking and careful polish. Her eulogy on Vasco Nunez de Balboa, first European to see the Pacific Ocean from the isthmus of what is today Panama, exemplifies her poetic style. Her works of fiction were "briskly told" and, like her verses, appealed to the sentiment of the broader reading public.

== Selected works ==
- For a woman: A novel ...
- A book of love stories
- Lady Wentworth, 1857
- Letter to Mrs. Sargent. Providence, RI. 1876 Mar. 22.
- Bessie's trials at boarding-school, 1876
- Dolly's kettledrum, 1883
- The children's cherry feast, 1886
- For a woman, 1886
- A school-girl's pleasure-book, 1888
- The youngest Miss Lorton : and other stories, 1888
- Another flock of girls, 1890
- A rosebud garden of girls, 1892
- After the ball; Her lover's friend, 1896
- Three little daughters of the revolution, 1896
- La belle-mère de May-Bartlett, 1898
- Cottage neighbors, 1899
- That little Smith girl, 1899
- May Bartlett's stepmother, 1900
- Ju Ju's Christmas party, 1901
- Margy's two troubles; and other stories, 1907
