= Fashionable novel =

19th-century genre of English literature

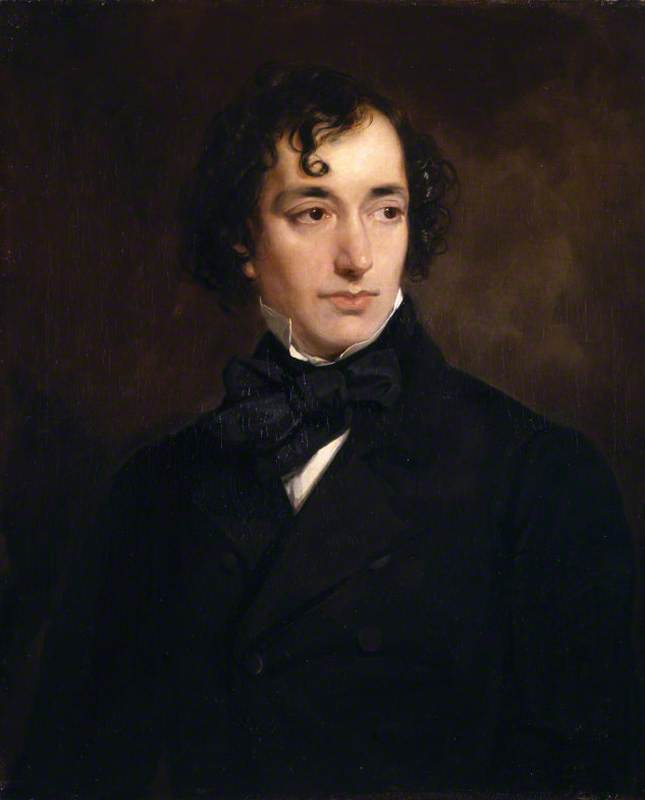
Portrait of Benjamin Disraeli by Francis Grant. Disraeli was a notable writer of silver fork novels early in his career.

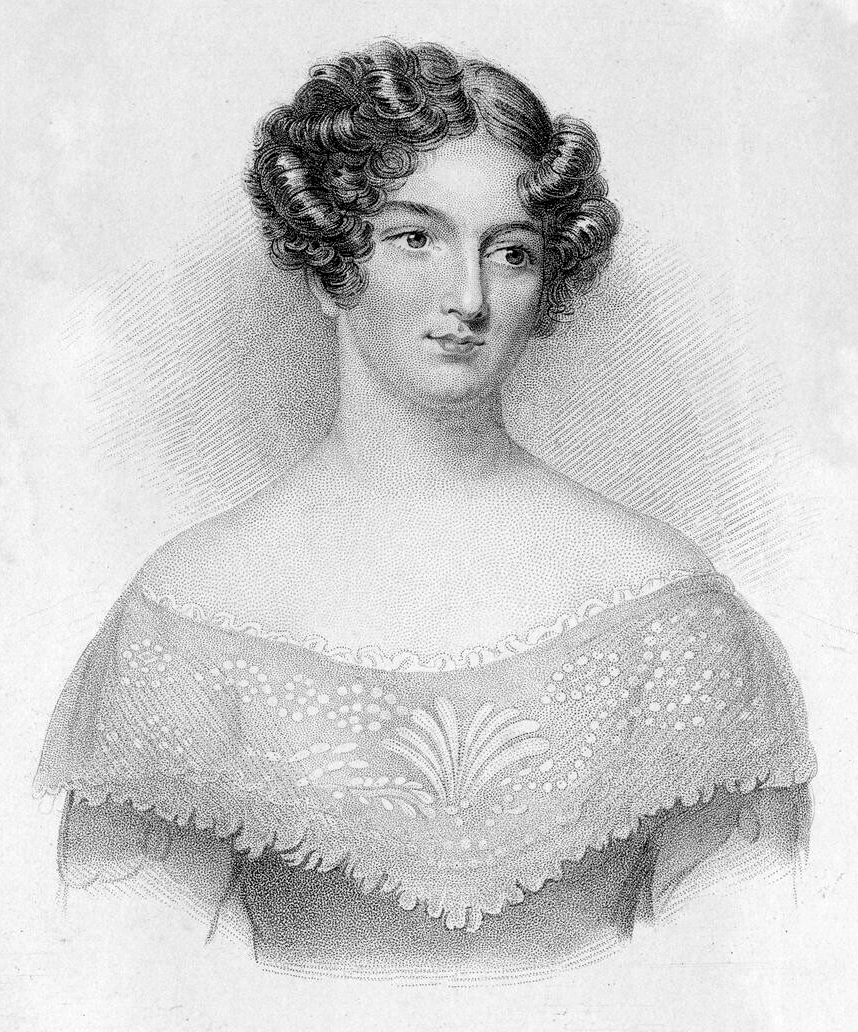
Catherine Gore was a prolific and bestselling author of the silver fork genre.

Fashionable novels, also called silver-fork novels, were a 19th-century genre of English literature that depicted the lives of the upper class and the aristocracy.

== Era ==
The silver-fork novels dominated the English literature market from the mid-1820s to the mid-1840s. They were often indiscreet, and on occasion "keys" would circulate that identified the real people on which the principal characters were based. Their emphasis on the relations of the sexes and on marital relationships presaged later development in the novel.

== Genre and satire of the genre ==
Theodore Hook was a major writer of fashionable novels, and Henry Colburn was a major publisher. Colburn particularly advertised fashionable novels as providing insight into aristocratic life by insiders. Edward Bulwer-Lytton, Benjamin Disraeli and Catherine Gore were other very popular writers of the genre. Many were advertised as being written by aristocrats, for aristocrats.

As more women wrote the genre, it became increasingly moralized: "middle-class morality became central, and the novels detailed the demise of the aristocracy, though the characteristically Byronic heroes of the genre remained." The most popular authors of silver fork novels were women, including Catherine Gore and Lady Charlotte Bury.

William Hazlitt coined the term "silver fork" in an article on "The Dandy School" in 1827. He characterized them as having "under-bred tone" because while they purported to tell the lives of aristocrats, they were commonly written by the middle-class. Thomas Carlyle wrote Sartor Resartus in critique of their minute detailing of clothing, and William Makepeace Thackeray satirized them in Vanity Fair and Pendennis.

== In modern culture ==
In Donna Leon's fourth Commissario Guido Brunetti novel, Death and Judgment, English professor Paola Brunetti describes silver-fork novels as "books written in the eighteenth century, when all that money poured into England from the colonies, and the fat wives of Yorkshire weavers had to be taught which fork to use."

== Notable novels ==
- Matilda by Lord Normanby (1825)
- Tremaine by Robert Plumer Ward (1825)
- Vivian Grey by Benjamin Disraeli (1826)
- Granby by Thomas Henry Lister (1826)
- Flirtation by Lady Charlotte Bury (1827)
- The Disowned by Edward Bulwer-Lytton (1828)
- Pelham by Edward Bulwer-Lytton (1828)
- Herbert Lacy by Thomas Henry Lister (1828)
- De Lisle by Elizabeth Caroline Grey (1828)
- Yes and No by Lord Normanby (1828)
- The Exclusives by Lady Charlotte Bury (1830)
- The Separation by Lady Charlotte Bury (1830)
- Women as They Are by Catherine Gore (1830)
- Pin Money by Catherine Gore (1831)
- The Young Duke by Benjamin Disraeli (1831)
- The Opera by Catherine Gore (1832)
- The Fair of Mayfair by Catherine Gore (1832)
- Arlington by Thomas Henry Lister (1832)
- The Contrast by Lord Normanby (1832)
- Godolphin by Edward Bulwer-Lytton (1833)
- Love and Pride by Theodore Hook (1833)
- A Year at Hartlebury by Benjamin and Sarah Disraeli (1834)
- Gilbert Gurney by Theodore Hook (1835)
- The Devoted by Lady Charlotte Bury (1836)
- Mrs. Armytage by Catherine Gore (1836)
- Henrietta Temple by Benjamin Disraeli (1837)
- The Cabinet Minister by Catherine Gore (1839)
- Cecil by Catherine Gore (1841)
- The Ambassador's Wife by Catherine Gore (1842)

== See also ==
- Silver spoon
