= Catherine Gore =

English novelist and dramatist (1798–1861)

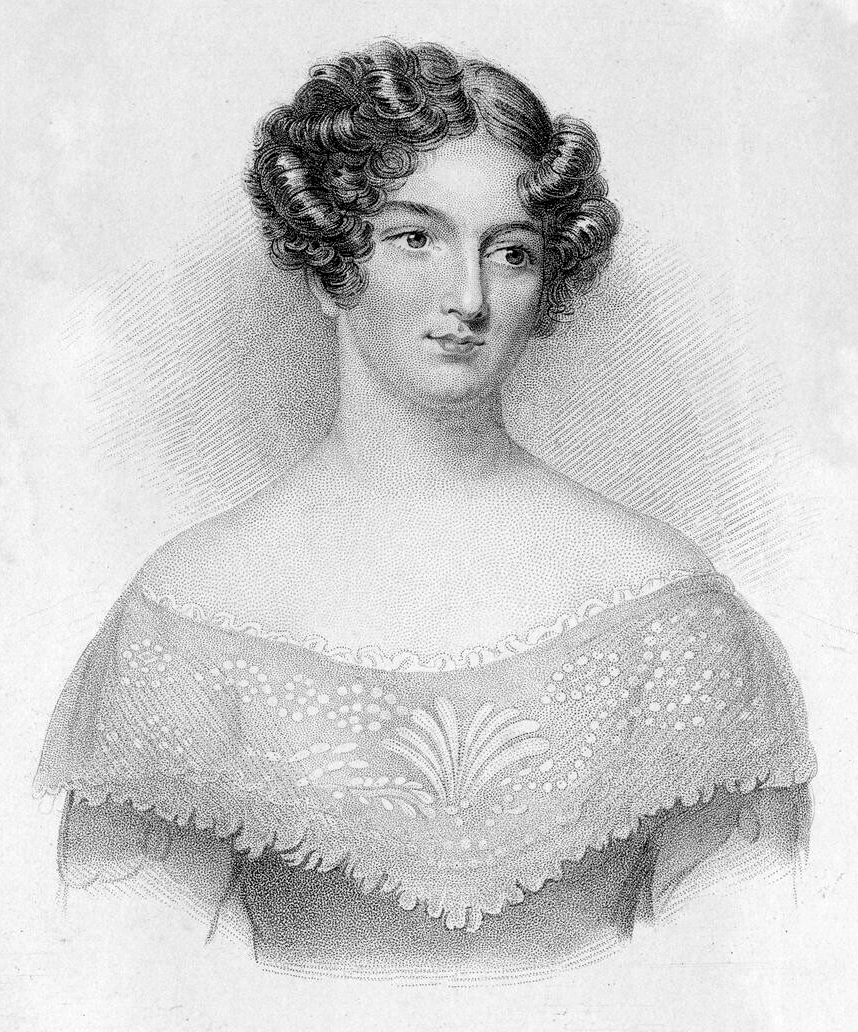
- Born: February 12, 1798; London, United Kingdom
- Died: January 29. 1861; Linwood, Renfrewshire, Scotland
- Resting place: Kensal Green Cemetery, London, England
- Occupations: novelist, dramatist

Catherine Grace Frances Gore (née Moody; 12 February 1798 – 29 January 1861), was a prolific English novelist and dramatist. The daughter of a wine merchant from Retford, Nottinghamshire, she became among the best known of the silver fork writers, who depicted gentility and etiquette in the high society of the Regency period.

== Early life and marriage ==
Gore was born in 1798 in London, the youngest child of Mary (née Brinley) and Charles Moody, a wine merchant. Her father died soon afterwards, and her mother remarried in 1801, to the London physician Charles D. Nevinson. She is therefore referred to sometimes as "Miss Nevinson" by contemporary reviewers and in scholarly writings. Gore herself was interested in writing from an early age, gaining the nickname "the Poetess".

She married Lieutenant Charles Arthur Gore of the 1st Regiment of Life Guards on 15 February 1823 at St George's, Hanover Square; Gore retired later that year. They later moved to France. They had ten children, eight of whom died young. Their one surviving son, Captain Augustus Frederick Wentworth Gore, married Hon. Emily Anne Curzon, daughter of MP Robert Curzon and granddaughter of Viscount Curzon, in 1861, and was the father of tennis champion Arthur Wentworth Gore. Their eldest child and sole surviving daughter, Cecilia Anne Mary, married Lord Edward Thynne in 1853.

== Literary career ==
Gore's first novel, Theresa Marchmont, or The Maid of Honour, was published in 1824. Her first major success was Pin Money, published in 1831, but her most popular and well-known novel was to be Cecil, or Adventures of a Coxcomb, published in 1841. Gore also met with success as a playwright, writing eleven plays that made their way onto the London stage, although her plays never quite matched the fame of her witty novels. Amongst her plays are The School for Coquettes (1831) and Quid Pro Quo (1844).

The Gores resided mainly in Continental Europe, where Catherine supported her family by her voluminous writings. Between 1824 and 1862 she produced about 70 works, the most successful of which were novels of fashionable English life, such as Manners of the Day (1830), Cecil, or the Adventures of a Coxcomb and The Banker's Wife (1843). She wrote articles in Bentley's Miscellany under the pseudonym "Albany Poyntz". She also wrote for the stage, composed music, and published The Book of Roses, or The Rose Fancier's Manual (1838), a guide to the cultivation of roses.

Gore's 1861 obituary in The Times concluded that Gore was "the best novel writer of her class and the wittiest woman of her age."

== Works ==
- The Broken Hearts (1823)
- Theresa Marchmont, or the Maid of Honour (1824)
- The Bond: A Dramatic Poem (1824)
- Richelieu, or the Broken Heart (1826)
- The Lettre de Cachet: A Tale (1827)
- The Reign of Terror: A Tale (1827)
- Hungarian Tales (1829)
- Romances of Real Life (1829, revised 1835)
- Women as They Are (1830)
- The Historical Traveller (1831)
- The School for Coquettes (1831)
- Pin Money: A Novel (1831)
- The Tuileries (1831)
- Mothers and Daughters: A Tale of the Year 1830 (1831)
- The Opera: A Novel (1832)
- The Fair of Mayfair (1832)
- The Sketchbook of Fashion (1833)
- Polish Tales (1833)
- The Hamiltons, or the New Era (1834)
- The Maid of Crossey, King O'neil, and The Queen's Champion (1835)
- The Diary of a Désennuyée (1836)
- Mrs. Armytage, or Female Domination (1836)
- Stokeshill Place, or The Man of Business (1837)
- The Rose Fancier's Manual (1838)
- Mary Raymond and Other Tales (1838)
- The Woman of the World (1838)
- The Cabinet Minister (1839)
- The Courtier of the Days of Charles II, with other Tales (1839)
- A Good Night's Rest (1839)
- Dacre of the South, or the Olden Time: A Drama in Verse (1840)
- The Dowager, or the New School for Scandal (1840)
- Preferment, or My Uncle the Earl (1840)
- The Abbey and Other Tales (1840)
- Greville, or a Season in Paris (1841)
- Cecil, or Adventures of a Coxcomb (1841)
- Cecil, A Peer (1841), a sequel
- Paris in 1841 (1842)
- The Man of Fortune and Other Tales (1842)
- The Ambassador's Wife (1842)
- The Moneylender (1843)
  - Der Geldverleiher : ein viktorianischer Roman, übersetzt von Theodor Fontane; ediert und mit einer Einleitung versehen von Iwan-Michelangelo D'Aprile, Berlin : Die Andere Bibliothek, September 2021, ISBN 978-3-8477-0441-6
  - Der Geldverleiher, Deutsch von Ludwig Hauff, Stuttgart : Franckh, 1846
- Modern Chivalry, or a New Orlando Furioso (1843)
- The Banker's Wife, or Court and City (1843)
- Agathonia: A Romance (1844)
- Marrying for Money (in Omnibus of Modern Romance (1844)
- The Birthright and Other Tales (1844)
- Quid per Quo, or the Day of The Dupes, a Comedy (1844)
- The Popular Member: The Wheel of Fortune (1844)
- Self (1845)
- The Story of a Royal Favourite (1845)
- The Snowstorm: A Christmas Story (1845)
- Peers and Parvenus: A Novel (1846)
- New Year's Day: A Winter's Tale (1846)
- Men of Capital (1846)
- The Debutante, or The London Season (1846)
- Sketches of English Character (1846)
- Castles in The Air: A Novel (1847)
- Temptation and Atonement and Other Tales (1847)
- The Inundation, or Pardon and Peace: A Christmas Story (1847)
- The Diamond and the Pearl: A Novel (1849)
- Adventures in Borneo (1849)
- The Dean's Daughter, or The Days We Live In (1853)
- The Lost Son: A Winter's Tale (1854)
- Transmutation, or The Lord and the Lost (1854)
- Progress and Prejudice (1854)
- Mammon, or The Hardships of an Heiress (1855)
- A Life's Lessons: A Novel (1856)
- The Two Aristocracies: A Novel (1857)
- Heckington: A Novel (1858)

== See also ==
- Jane Austen
- Susan Edmonstone Ferrier
