= Henry Colburn =

British publisher (1784–1855)

Henry Colburn (1784 – 16 August 1855) was a British publisher.

== Life ==
Virtually nothing is known about Henry Colburn's parentage or early life, and there is uncertainty over his year of birth. He was well-educated and fluent in French and had the financial capital at a young age to enter publishing, giving credence to the hypothesis of Michael Sadleir that he may have been the illegitimate son of an Englishman by a French mother.

He is first documented as an apprentice printer indentured for six years to William Earle, a bookseller in Albemarle Street, London, on 1 June 1800 for the sum of £1,000. Earle's was an established English and foreign language library. In 1806, Colburn acquired Morgan's circulating library based in Conduit Street, from where he published his first books, notably works by popular light novelists translated from French and German. Most of the French novels were published in the original language by Chez Colburn and then reissued in translation. A few were non fiction, as can be seen in the table.

Early publications
Title	Author	Advertised	Published
Anecdotes, Interesting Narratives, and Miscellanies	Kotzebue	Nov 1806	1806
The Pastor's Daughter, with other Romances	Kotzebue	Nov 1806	1806
Convent of Notre Dame, or Jeannette	Ducray-Duminil (tr. Meeke)	Mar 1807	1807
An Essay on the Study of Statistics	Daniel Boileau	Apr 1807	1807
The Second Titan War Against Heaven	Barrett	Jun 1807	1807
Christina, or memoirs of a German Princess	de Montolieu	Sep 1807	1807
Memoirs of Female Philosophers	Anon (after Hamilton)	Nov 1807	1808
The Sorrows of Gustavus, or The History of a Young Swede	von Krüdener	Nov 1807	1808
The Romance of the Appennines, or memoirs of the Viterba family	Anon	Nov 1807	1808
Le Duc de Lauzun (French)	de Genlis	Jan 1807	1808
History of the Female Sex	Meiners	Jan 1808	1808
Zoological Anecdotes	William Brewster	Feb 1808	1808
The Duke of Lauzun (English)	de Genlis	Mar 1808	1808
Sainclair, ou la Victime des Sciences et des Arts (French)	de Genlis	Apr 1808	1808
Claire d'Albe (French)	Cottin	May 1808	1808
The Earl of Cork (in French and English)	de Genlis	May 1808	1808
Les Souvenirs de Felici L*** (French)	de Genlis	May 1808	1808
Clara: a Novel (in French and English)	Cottin	May 1808	1808
Bélisaire (in French and English)	de Genlis	Aug 1808	1808
A Picture of Valencia	Fischer	Sep 1808	1808
History of Brazil	Andrew Grant MD	Sep 1808	1809
A Picture of Lisbon	Link	Sep 1808	1809
Honourine d'Userche, Saint Anne, and the Ruins of Yedburg (in English and French)	de Charrière	Nov 1809	1809
Atala ou des Amours de deux Sauvages dans le Desert (French)	de Chateaubriand	Nov 1809	1809
Theodore et Blanche (French)	Cottin	Nov 1808	
Malvina (French)	Cottin	Dec 1808	1809
Amelie Mansfield (French)	Cottin	Dec 1808	1809
Alphonso, or The Natural Son	de Genlis	Dec 1808	1809
The Batchelor	Thomas George Moore	Dec 1808	1809
Leontina	Kotzebue	Dec 1808	1809

He had an early coup in publishing Lady Caroline Lamb's roman à clef (and succès de scandale) novel Glenarvon (1816), which went through four editions and sold very well. Lady Morgan's France (1817) was another of his earliest successful ventures. A furious attack in the Quarterly Review (April 1817) did more good than harm to the book. Glenarvon was a harbinger of Colburn's later great innovation, the so-called "silver fork novel", a kind of fashionable novel which gave readers the thrill of peering into the lifestyles of rich and aristocratic families. In 1827 he published one of the first science fiction novels, The Mummy! A Tale of the Twenty-Second Century written by Jane Webb (later known as Jane C. Loudon).

At the beginning of 1824 his publishing interests were separated from the library and established in New Burlington Street.

In 1830 Colburn took his printer, Richard Bentley into a partnership, which was dissolved in August 1832. Having first set up business again at Windsor for a short time, Colburn paid a forfeiture for breaking the covenant not to commence publishing within twenty miles of London, and opened a house in Great Marlborough Street. He finally retired from business in favour of Messrs. Hurst & Blackett, but kept his name attached to a few books. These included Elliot Warburton's Crescent and the Cross, the Diaries of Evelyn and Pepys, Agnes Strickland's Lives and Burke's Peerage. Their copyrights went to auction at Southgate & Barrett on 26 May 1857, and produced about £14,000.

Colburn amassed a considerable fortune, his property being sworn as under £35,000.

== Periodicals ==
With the support of Frederic Shoberl, Colburn started in 1814 New Monthly Magazine, and Universal Register, a rival to the old Monthly Magazine of Sir Richard Phillips. John Watkins and Alaric Alexander Watts were among the early editors. A new series began in 1820 under the care of Thomas Campbell. Bulwer Lytton (1832), Theodore Hook, and Harrison Ainsworth (3rd ser., 1836) successively were editors. The magazine lasted to 1875.

On 25 January 1817, Colburn brought out the first number of the Literary Gazette, priced at one shilling. It was the earliest weekly newspaper devoted to literature, science, and the arts which obtained reputation and authority. Initially Hannibal Evans Lloyd, and Thomasina Ross who had worked with Lloyd before, appear to have been joint editors. The department of fine arts was under the care of William Paulet Carey. After the twenty-sixth number (19 July 1817) William Jerdan purchased a third share of the property and became sole editor. Messrs. Longman also purchased a third, and the periodical was rapidly successful. In 1842, William Jerdan became sole proprietor. The Gazette was incorporated with the Parthenon in 1862.

On 31 December 1827, Colburn wrote to Jerdan that he had joined the new literary journal, the Athenaeum, "in consequence of the injustice done to my authors generally" by the Gazette. In 1828, he founded the Court Journal; in the following year he brought out the United Service Magazine and Naval and Military Journal; and he had some interest in the Sunday Times.

A biography of David Lester Richardson recounts the background to Colburn's Court Journal. Richardson established the London Weekly Review in 1827, but was compelled to give it up in 1828; he entered into an agreement under which Colburn would assume control of the journal in return for Richardson receiving a share in the profits of sales of the London Weekly Review. Colburn ingeniously renamed the publication as the Court Journal, and Richardson's anticipated rewards evaporated.

== Books ==
After the successes of Lady Caroline Lamb's Glenarvon (1816) and Lady Morgan's France (1817), Colburn, at the suggestion of William Upcott, brought out the first edition of John Evelyn's Diary in 1818. It was followed by his publication of Richard Griffin, 3rd Baron Braybrooke‘s edition of Pepys's Diary in 1825, followed by his expanded further editions in 1848-49, and 1854. At the height of Theodore Hook's headlong London career, Colburn offered him £600. for a novel, and Sayings and Doings (1824) was the result. Six thousand copies of the three volumes are said to have been sold. In 1827, he published Thomas Skinner Sturr's anonymous Richmond, or stories in the life of a Bow Street officer, the earliest collection of detective stories.

In 1826, Colburn published The Posthumous Works of Anne Radcliffe, featuring Gaston de Blondeville, and A Memoir of The Authoress, the first known biographical work on Mrs. Radcliffe.

Colburn was a major purveyor of the fashionable novel mode of social fiction called "Silver Fork" after a phrase coined by William Hazlitt.

The series of Colburn's Modern Standard Novelists (1835–41, 19 vols.), containing works by Thomas Campbell, Bulwer Lytton, Theodore Hook and Harrison Ainsworth, Lady Morgan, Robert Plumer Ward, Horace Smith, Marryat, Thomas Henry Lister, G. P. R. James, and George Robert Gleig. Colburn also numbered among "my authors" Disraeli, John Banim, and fashionable novelists of the day.

Colburn's book series, The Naval and Military Library of Entertainment: A Series of Works from the Pens of Distinguished Officers. Now First Collected (1834, 20 vols.), contained works by Marryat, Gleig and other lesser known authors on nonfiction subjects, including travel and memoirs, and military-related fiction, "particularly suited to the taste and pursuits of the members" of the Army and Navy.

In addition, he published several important works on British naval history, including Edward Pelham Brenton's The Naval History of Great Britain (1837) and Life and Correspondence of John, Earl of St. Vincent (1838) as well as Sir Nicholas Harris Nicolas's seven-volume The Dispatches and Letters of Vice Admiral Lord Viscount Nelson (1844–1846)".

Among the important British diplomatic documents that he published were G. P. R. James, ed., Letters Illustrative of the Reign of William III from 1696 to 1708 Adressed to the Duke of Shrewsbury by James Vernon, Esq., Secretary of State].] (Three volumes, 1841).

== Family ==
He was twice married, the second time to Eliza Anne, only daughter of Captain Crosbie, who survived him. He died at his house in Bryanston Square on 16 August 1855. He was buried in Kensal Green Cemetery.

== Sources ==
- Boase, George Clement (1897). "Shoberl, Frederic" . In Lee, Sidney (ed.). Dictionary of National Biography. Vol. 52. London: Smith, Elder & Co.
- Sutherland, John & Melnyk, Veronica, Rogue Publisher 'The Prince of Puffers': The Life and Works of the Publisher Henry Colburn (Edward Everett Root Publishers Co., 2018)
