= Seaward =

Seaward may refer to:

== People ==
- Carolyn Seaward (born 1960), former beauty queen who appeared in the 1983 Bond film Octopussy
- John Seaward (1786–1858), British civil engineer and mechanical engineer
- Kevin Seaward (born 1983), Northern Irish marathon runner from Belfast, assistant headteacher at a school in Leicestershire
- Paul Seaward, British historian specialising in seventeenth-century English history
- Richard Seaward Cantrell (1825–1872), Member of Parliament from Dunedin, New Zealand
- Sydney Seaward (1884–1967), English actor
- Tracey Seaward (born 1965), English film producer

== Geography ==
- Seaward Kaikōura Range, two parallel ranges of mountains in the northeast of the South Island of New Zealand
- Seaward River, river in New Zealand's South Island
- Seaward Rock, a rock close to the northeast of Mollyhawk Island in the Bay of Isles, South Georgia

== Sailing ==
- Seaward Eagle, American sailboat first built in 1996
- Seaward Fox, American trailerable sailboat first built in 1993
- Seaward 22, American trailerable sailboat first built in 1985
- Seaward 23, American trailerable sailboat first built in 1984
- Seaward 24, American trailerable sailboat first built in 1984
- Seaward 25, American trailerable sailboat first built in 1984
- Seaward 26RK, American trailerable sailboat first built in 2005
- Seaward 32RK, American sailboat first built in 2006
- Seaward 46RK, American sailboat first built in 2012

== Other sea vessels ==
- MS Seaward, cruise ship owned and last operated by Star Cruises
- USS Seaward (IX-60), schooner of the United States Navy during World War II
- Seaward-class defense boats, large patrol craft for the Indian Navy

== See also ==
- C-word
- Saward
- Sayward
- Seward (disambiguation)
- Siward (disambiguation)
- Soward
