= Represent =

Represent may refer to:

- Represent (Compton's Most Wanted album) or the title song, 2000
- Represent (Fat Joe album), 1993
- Represent, an album by DJ Magic Mike, 1994
- "Represent" (song), by Nas, 1994
- "Represent", a song by the Red Jumpsuit Apparatus from Lonely Road, 2009
- "Represent", a song by Weezer, 2010
- Represent (clothing brand), British clothing brand

== See also ==
- Reprazent, a British drum and bass group
- Reprezent, a radio station based in London
- Representation (disambiguation)
- Representative (disambiguation)
- "Representin", a song by Ludacris and Kelly Rowland
