= Embodiment =

Embodied or embodiment may refer to:

== Anthropology ==
- Embodiment theory in anthropology

== Cognitive science ==
- Embodied bilingual language, in cognitive science
- Embodied cognition, a theory that many aspects of cognition are shaped by the body
- Embodied cognitive science, seeks to explain the mechanisms underlying intelligent behavior
- Embodied design, that the actions of the body can play a role in the development of thought and ideas
- Embodied imagination, a therapeutic form of working with dreams and memories
- Embodied knowledge, a.k.a. tacit knowledge

== Music and arts ==
- Embodiment 12:14, a Christian Australian metalcore band
- Embodiment: Collapsing Under the Weight of God, a 2008 album by the band Sculptured
- Embodied music cognition, in musicology
- Embodied writing, practices are used by academics and artists to highlight the connection between writing and the body
- Embodiment, 2015 album by Katerine Duska
- Embodiment (Enterprise Earth album), 2017 album by Enterprise Earth

== Other ==
- Claim (patent), in patent law, embodiment refers to implementation of an invention
- Embodied agent, an agent with a physical presence in the world (Robotics)
- Embodied energy, required to produce any goods or services
- Embodied water or virtual water, the water used in the production of a good or service
- Incarnation, the embodiment of a deity or spirit in some earthly form, an anthropomorphic form of a god
- Personification, an embodiment of an entity, usually in the form of a person

== See also ==
- Embodyment, American Christian rock band
