= The Representative =

The Representative may refer to:

- The Representative (newspaper), a London newspaper published in 1826
- The Representative (play) or The Deputy (German: Der Stellvertreter), a 1963 play by Rolf Hochhuth
- The Representative, 2011 film with Kevin Dobson

== See also ==
- Representative (disambiguation)
- Representation (disambiguation)
