= Michael Saward =

Michael Saward may refer to:

- Michael Saward (British Army officer) (1841–1928), British Army officer
- Michael Saward (priest) (1932–2015), British Anglican priest, author and hymnist
- Michael Saward (political theorist) (born 1960), Australian political theorist
