= Modern elementary mathematics =

Modern elementary mathematics is the theory and practice of teaching elementary mathematics according to contemporary research and thinking about learning. This can include pedagogical ideas, mathematics education research frameworks, and curricular material.

In practicing modern elementary mathematics, teachers may use new and emerging media and technologies like social media and video games, as well as applying new teaching techniques based on the individualization of learning, in-depth study of the psychology of mathematics education, and integrating mathematics with science, technology, engineering and the arts.

== General practice ==
=== Areas of mathematics ===
Making all areas of mathematics accessible to young children is a key goal of modern elementary mathematics. Author and academic Liping Ma calls for "profound understanding of fundamental mathematics" by elementary teachers and parents of learners, as well as learners themselves.

- Algebra: Early algebra covers the approach to elementary mathematics which helps children generalize number and set ideas.
- Probability and statistics: Modern technologies make probability and statistics accessible to elementary learners with tools such as computer-assisted data visualization.
- Geometry: Specially developed physical and virtual manipulatives, as well as interactive geometry software, can make geometry (beyond basic sorting and measuring) available to elementary learners.
- Calculus: New innovations, such as Don Cohen's map to calculus, which was developed using children's work and level of understanding, is making calculus accessible to elementary learners.
- Problem solving: Creative problem solving, which contrasts with exercises in arithmetic, such as adding or multiplying numbers, is now a major part of elementary mathematics.

Other areas of mathematics such as logical reasoning and paradoxes, which used to be reserved for advanced groups of learners, are now being integrated into more mainstream curricula.

=== Use of psychology ===
Psychology in mathematics education is an applied research domain, with many recent developments relevant to elementary mathematics. A major aspect is the study of motivation; while most young children enjoy some mathematical practices, by the age of seven to ten many lose interest and begin to experience mathematical anxiety. Constructivism and other learning theories consider the ways young children learn mathematics, taking child developmental psychology into account.

Both practitioners and researchers focus on children's memory, mnemonic devices, and computer-assisted techniques such as spaces repetition. There is an ongoing discussion of relationships between memory, procedural fluency with algorithms, and conceptual understanding of elementary mathematics. Sharing songs, rhymes, visuals and other mnemonics is popular in teacher social networks.

The understanding that young children benefit from hands-on learning is more than a century old, going back to the work of Maria Montessori. However, there are modern developments of the theme. Traditional manipulatives are now available on computers as virtual manipulatives, with many offering options not available in the physical world, such as zoom or cross-section of geometric shapes. Embodied mathematics, such as studies of numerical cognition or gestures in learning, are growing research topics in mathematics education.

=== Accommodating individual students ===
Modern tools such as computer-based expert systems allow higher individualization of learning. Special education and gifted education in particular require level and style accommodations, such as using different presentation and response options. Changing some aspects of the environment, such as giving an auditory learner headphones with quiet music, can help children concentrate on mathematical tasks.

Modern learning materials, both computer and physical, accommodate learners through the use of multiple representation, such as graphs, pictures, words, animations, symbols, and sounds. For example, recent research suggests that sign language isn't only a means of speaking for those who are deaf, but also a visual approach to communication and learning, appealing to many others students and particularly helping with mathematics.

Another aspect of individual education is child-led learning, which is called unschooling when it encompasses most of the child's experiences. Child-led learning means incorporating mathematically rich projects that stem from personal interests and passions. Educators who support child-led learning need to provide tasks that are open to interpretation, and be ready to improvise, rather than prepare lessons ahead of time. This modern approach often involves seizing opportunities for discovery, and learning as the child's curiosity demands. This departure from conventional structured learning leaves the child free to explore his/her innate desires and curiosities. Child-led learning taps into the child's intrinsic love of learning.

Problem solving can be an intensely individualized activity, with students working in their own ways and also sharing insights and results within groups. There are many means to one end, emphasizing the importance of creative approaches. Promoting discourse and focusing on language are important concepts for helping each students participate in problem solving meaningfully.

Data-based assessment and comparison of learning methods, and ways children learn, is another big aspect of modern elementary mathematics.

== Use of emerging technologies ==
=== Computation technology ===
Modern computation technologies change elementary mathematics in several ways. Technology reduces the amount of attention, memory, and computation required by users, making higher mathematical topics accessible to young children. However, the main opportunity technology provides is not in making traditional mathematical tasks more accessible, but in introducing children to novel activities that are not possible without computers.

For example, computer modeling allows children to change parameters in virtual systems created by educators and observe emergent mathematical behaviors, or remix and create their own models. The pedagogical approach of constructionism describes how creating algorithms, programs and models on computers promotes deep mathematical thinking. Technology allows children to experience these complex concepts in a more visual manner.

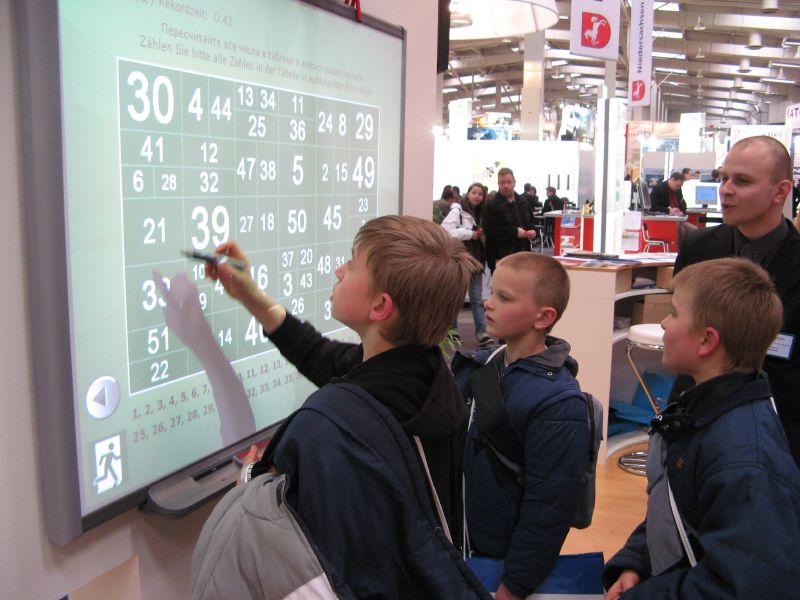
Children use an interactive whiteboard.

Computer algebra systems are software environments that support and scaffold working with symbolic expressions. Some computer algebra systems have intuitive, child-friendly interfaces and therefore can be used in Early Algebra. Interactive geometry software supports creation and manipulation of geometric constructions. Both computer algebra systems and interactive geometry software help with several cognitive limitations of young children, such as attention and memory. The software scaffolds step-by-step procedures, helping children focus attention. It has "undo" capabilities, lowering frustration when errors happen, and promoting creativity and exploration. Also, such software supports metacognition by making all steps in a problem or a construction visible and editable, so children can reflect on individual steps or the whole journey.

=== Social media ===
Online communities and forums allow educators, researchers and students to share, discuss and remix elementary mathematical content they find or create. Sometimes, traditional media such as texts, pictures and movies are digitized and turned into online social objects, such as open textbooks. Other times, web-native mathematical objects are created, remixed and shared within the integrated authoring and discussion environment, such as applets made with Scratch or Geogebra constructions.

Rich media, including video, virtual manipulatives, interactive models and mobile applications is a characteristic feature of online mathematical communication. Some global collaboration projects between teachers or groups of students with teachers use the web mostly for communication, but others happen in virtual worlds, such as Whyville.

Professional development for elementary mathematics educators uses social media in the form of online courses, discussion forums, webinars, and web conferences. This supports teachers in forming PLNs (Personal Learning Networks). Some communities include both students and teachers, such as Art of Problem Solving.

== Teaching mathematics in context ==
=== Games and play ===
Learning through play is not new, but the themes of computer and mobile games are relatively more modern. Most teachers now use games in elementary classrooms, and most children in developed countries play learning games at home. Computer games with intrinsically mathematical game mechanics can help children learn novel topics. More extrinsic game mechanics and gamification can be used for time and task management, fluency, and memorization. Sometimes it's not obvious what mathematics children learn by "just playing," but basic spatial and numerical skills gained in free play help with mathematical concepts.

Some abstract games such as chess can benefit learning mathematics by developing systems thinking, logic, and reasoning. Roleplaying games invite children to become a character who uses mathematics in daily life or epic adventures, and often use mathematical storytelling. Sandbox, also called open world games, such as Minecraft help children explore patterns, improvise, be mathematically artistic, and develop their own algorithms. Board games can have all of the above aspects, and also promote communication about mathematics in small groups.

Teachers working with disadvantaged kids note especially large mathematical skill gains after using games in the classroom, possibly because kids don't play such games at home.

Many teachers, parents and students design their own games or create versions of existing games. Designing mathematically rich games is one of staple tasks in constructionism.

There is a concern that children who use computer games and technology in general may be more stressed when exposed to pen-and-paper tests.

=== Family mathematics and everyday mathematics ===
While learning mathematics in daily life, such as cooking and shopping, can't be considered modern, social media provides new twists. Online networks help parents and teachers share tips on how to integrate daily routines and more formal mathematical learning for children. For example, the "Let's play math" blog hosts carnivals for sharing family mathematics ideas, such as using egg cartoons for quick mathematical games.

School tasks may involve families collecting data and aggregating it online for mathematical explorations. Pastimes such as geocaching involve families sharing mathematically rich sporting activities that depend on GPS systems or mobile devices. Museums, clubs, stores, and other public places provide blended learning opportunities, with visiting families accessing science and mathematics activities related to the place on their mobile devices.

=== STEM, social sciences, and the arts ===
In the last several decades, many prominent mathematicians and mathematics enthusiasts embraced mathematical arts, from popular fractal art to origami. Likewise, elementary mathematics is becoming more artistic. Some popular topics for children include tessellation, computer art, symmetry, patterns, transformations and reflections. The discipline of ethnomathematics studies relationships between mathematics and cultures, including arts and crafts. Some hands-on activities, such as creating tiling, can help children and grown-ups see mathematical art all around them.

Project-based learning approaches help students explore mathematics together with other disciplines. For example, children's robotics projects and competitions include mathematical tasks.

Some elementary mathematical topics, such as measurement, apply to tasks in many professions and subject areas. Unit studies centered on such concepts contrast with project-based learning, where students use many concepts to achieve the project's goal.

== See also ==
- Natural math
