= Representative =

Representative may refer to:

== Politics ==
- Representative democracy, type of democracy in which elected officials represent a group of people
- House of Representatives, legislative body in various countries or sub-national entities
- Legislator, someone who is a member of a legislature

== Mathematics ==
- Representative (mathematics), an element of an equivalence class representing the class

== Other uses ==
- Sales representative
- Manufacturers' representative
- Customer service representative
- Holiday rep
- Representative sample, in statistics a sample or subset meant to represent a population
- Representative director (Japan), most senior executive in charge of managing a corporation in Japan
- The Representative (newspaper), unsuccessful 1826 London newspaper

== See also ==
- Representation (disambiguation)
- Rep (disambiguation)
- Presentative (disambiguation)
- Special Representative, a diplomatic rank
- The Representative (disambiguation)
