= Gita Hashemi =

Iranian-Canadian artist

- گیتا هاشمی
- Born: 1961 (age 63–64); Shiraz, Iran
- Education: Tehran University School of Fine Arts, Iranian Calligraphy Institute] CSUN, York University
- Known for: Installation artist, Performance artist, writer, curator
- Notable work: Of Shifting Shadows, Ephemeral Monument, Headquarters: Pathology of an Ouster, Passages Trilogy, Declarations diptych, Grounding
- Website: gitaha.net

Gita Hashemi (Persian: گیتا هاشمی, born 1961) is an Iranian-born artist, writer and curator residing in Toronto, Ontario, Canada. Her work juxtaposes history and the present, political and personal, and local and global. It draws on language as both visual and narrative element, and includes installation, video, and performance art, with collaborative, participatory and interactive strategies.

== Biography ==
Hashemi was born in Shiraz. Due to her vocal political stance, Hashemi was expelled from the College of Fine Arts at the University of Iran. In 1984, she was forced to leave Iran.

She is known for her maxim, "The personal is poetic, the poetic is political, the political is personal." As an artist, she is less interested in working in the artistic mainstream and more interested in using art for activism.

== Career ==
She is the first Iranian artist to perform calligraphy as a live art, which she refers to as embodied writing. She was an early practitioner of Net art and Digital art (early-1990s to mid-2000s). Her narrative CD-R Of Shifting Shadows: Revisiting the 1979 Iranian Revolution through an Exilic Journey in History and Memory (2000) is a comprehensive artistic account of the Iranian Revolution and has been exhibited widely. Leonardo wrote that Of Shifting Shadows causes the viewer to "move like nomads around this place of images and sounds, locating the place where we can arrive at an understanding of the depth of these experiences."

In 2013, she showed an exhibit called The Idea of Freedom at the Montréal Arts Interculturels (MAI). The Hemispheric Institute wrote that The Idea of Freedom looks at the events in Iranian history and then "channels them into insights that are as personal as they are political."

In 2017, she was the first artist to use the Open Space Lab at Carleton University where she created large-scale Persian calligraphy based on the memoirs of a friend.

She has won the Ontario Association of Art Galleries' 2017 Monographic Exhibition of the Year for the monumental interdisciplinary performance Grounding, and the Baddeck International New Media Festival award for disk-based work for Of Shifting Shadows. Her work has been shown at the Casoria Contemporary Art Museum and at the Museo Fernando García Ponce - MACAY (Museo de Arte Contemporaneo de Yucatan).

== Publications ==
- Like Flesh and Blood
- Afghanistan, 2002: No Refuge
- The Idea of Freedom by Gita Hashemi
- Gita, Hashemi (2000). Of Shifting Shadows. Exisle Creation.
- Gita, Hashemi (2022). Rumi Roaming. Quattro Books. p. 216.
