= Presentative =

Presentative may refer to:

- In philosophy and psychology, capable of being directly perceived and represented by the mind
  - More specifically, represented in the mind as conceived in presentationism
- Presentative (linguistics), a word or construction that introduces a new referent and draws the attention towards it
- In ecclesiastical law, having the right of presentation

== See also ==
- Presentational (disambiguation)
- Representative (disambiguation)
