= Seaward 23 =

1980s US recreational keelboat

Development
- Designer: Nick Hake
- Location: United States
- Year: 1984
- Builder: Hake Yachts
- Role: Cruiser
- Name: Seaward 23

Boat
- Displacement: 2,700 lb (1,225 kg)
- Draft: 2.08 ft (0.63 m)

Hull
- Type: monohull
- Construction: fiberglass
- LOA: 24.50 ft (7.47 m)
- LWL: 21.00 ft (6.40 m)
- Beam: 8.33 ft (2.54 m)
- Engine: outboard motor or Yanmar inboard motor

Hull appendages
- Keel: wing keel
- Ballast: 900 lb (408 kg)
- Rudder: transom-mounted rudder

Rig
- Rig type: Bermuda rig

Sails
- Sailplan: fractional rigged sloop
- Total sail area: 264.00 sq ft (24.526 m^{2})

Racing
- PHRF: 285

The Seaward 23 is a recreational keelboat. It is a development of the Seaward 22. It was built by Hake Yachts in the United States, from 1984 until 2002, but it is now out of production.

== Design ==
The Seaward 23 is a recreational keelboat, built predominantly of solid fiberglass, with wood trim. It has a fractional sloop rig, a plumb stem with a bowsprit, a vertical transom, a transom-hung rudder controlled by a tiller or optional wheel and a fixed wing keel. The cabin has rectangular ports. A free-standing catboat rig, with a carbon fiber mast was a factory option. The boat displaces 2,700 lb (1,225 kg) and carries 900 lb (408 kg) of ballast.

The boat has a draft of 2.08 ft (0.63 m) with the standard wing keel.

The boat is normally fitted with a small 6 to 8 hp (4 to 6 kW) outboard motor or optional inboard Yanmar diesel engine for docking and maneuvering.

The design has sleeping accommodation for four people, with a double "V"-berth in the bow cabin and two straight settee berths in the main cabin and an aft cabin with a double berth on the port side. The galley is located on the starboard side just forward of the companionway ladder and is equipped with a single-burner stove and a sink. An icebox is located on the port side under the cockpit. Cabin headroom is 54 in (137 cm).

The design has a PHRF racing average handicap of 285 and a hull speed of 5.8 kn (10.7 km/h).

== Reception ==
In a 2010 review Steve Henkel wrote, "the Seaward 23 ... is a transformed version of the 22 ... though with the same waterline and the same basic hull structure. The centerboard on the 22 has been replaced with a very shallow fixed keel with wings, which, with a draft of just over two feet, is not likely to be very close-winded. There's a choice of rigs, either a fully battened cat rig with a big roach set on a freestanding carbon-fiber mast ... or a conventional sloop rig featuring a self-tacking jib. The sales brochure mentions a Yanmar diesel but doesn't give the size (which we assume is minimal) or say whether buyers can choose an outboard and omit the diesel. (We assume they can.) The sales brochure shows a wheel rather than the older 22's tiller; based on a cockpit configuration very similar to the older 22, we assume a tiller can be substituted (which we recommend doing for this size boat). Best features: The stern pulpit includes "catbird stern seats" on the quarters, for sightseeing while motoring along rivers. Hardware is upper-end quality...."

In a 2006 used boat review in the SpinSheet, Jack Hornor wrote, "The Seaward 23 has a well-proportioned shape with a nearly plumb bow, an apparent but not exaggerated sweep to the sheer, a bit of classic tumblehome sectional shape at the transom, and an outboard rudder. To my eye, this is a handsome little boat. ... If you’re attracted to the advantages offered by trailerable sailboats, the Seaward 23 is a practical choice that is light enough to be pulled by a full size vehicle or small pickup and available with an inboard diesel engine not typical on this type of boat."
