= Presentational =

Presentational may refer to:

- something related to presentation
- Presentational acting, a style of acting that acknowledges the audience
- Presentational (grammar), a grammatical construction that introduces, and draws the attention towards, a new referent

== See also ==
- Presentative (disambiguation)
