= Embodied design =

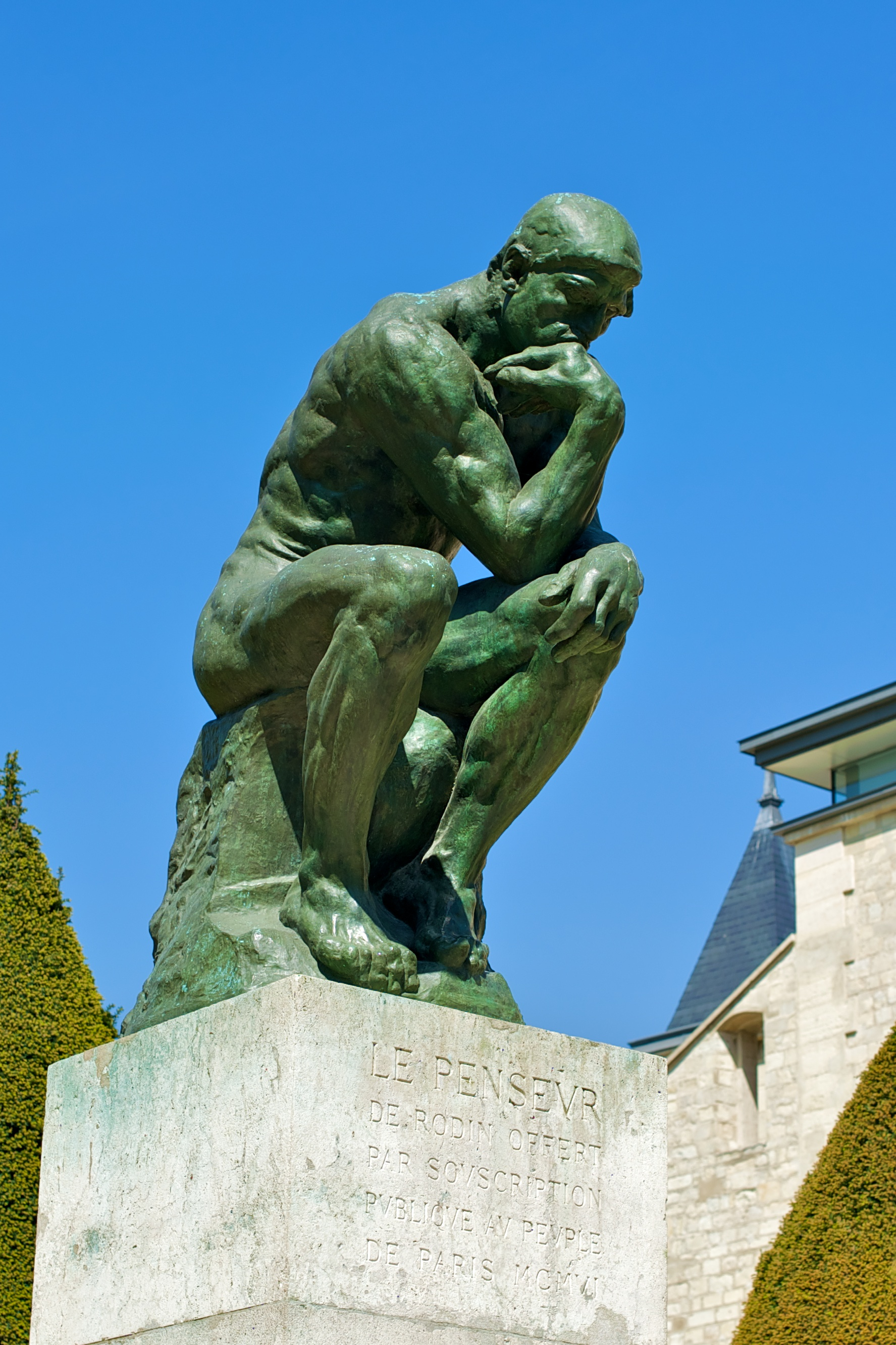
"What makes my Thinker think is that he thinks not only with his brain, with his knitted brow, his distended nostrils and compressed lips, but with every muscle of his arms, back and legs, with his clenched fists and gripping toes." - Auguste Rodin, sculptor of The Thinker

Embodied design grows from the idea of embodied cognition: that the actions of the body can play a role in the development of thought and ideas. Embodied design brings mathematics to life; studying the effects of the body on the mind, researchers learn how to design objects and activities for learning. Embodiment is an aspect of pattern recognition in all fields of human endeavor.

Embodied design has an increasing role in mathematics education. Designers can use embodied cognition as a tool to study human behavior and create user-centered designs. Embodied design examines the meaning of abstractions, analyzing student reasoning and connecting mathematics to other subjects; for example, students can look at proportional relationships in a work of art.

Learning strategies based on embodied design rely on motion and visualization; physical activity is helpful in learning a mathematical concept. When students are physically and mentally involved in learning, they retain content better. Recent theoretical advances such as Embodied Cognitive Load Theory have been suggested to harvest the potential advantages of embodied interaction modes for learning without filling up cognitive resources. Embodied design frequently includes trial-and-error learning.

Embodied cognition is a tool designers can use to study "human behavior normally unobservable in order to create human-centric designs". For teachers, embodied design is planning experiences for students with lesson plans, curricula, activities and lessons.

== Mathematical manipulatives ==
One aspect of embodied design is the use of manipulatives in learning. Manipulatives allow students to explore mathematical concepts by working with physical objects, linking their discoveries to abstractions. Although manipulatives are primarily used to illustrate modern elementary mathematics, educators use objects to represent abstract topics taught in high school, college and beyond. A function of embodied design is to expand the use of manipulatives to foster the understanding of undergraduate abstract mathematics.

One disadvantage of manipulatives is that students struggle to connect the physical activity to mathematical symbols and notation. Although manipulatives allow students to develop a deeper understanding of a concept, they need support to transfer that knowledge to algebraic representations.

Although an influential theory in the field of instructional design, cognitive load theory, recommends designs involving lower levels of interactivity in order to save up cognitive resources for learning, the benefits of embodied interactions are evident. As a result, a synthesis, embodied cognitive load theory, has been proposed to aid in embodied design. In this model, embodied interactions are conducive to learning if the cognitive costs (such as motor coordination) are outweighed by their benefits (such as multimodal processing).

== Problem solving ==
Another application of embodied design in mathematics education is its effect on problem solving and the development of critical-thinking skills. Throughout the problem-solving process students use objects to develop understanding, conveying understanding and meaning through gestures. Problem solvers use gestures to connect their thoughts to the manipulatives with which they are familiar, and changing a manipulative's shape affects how a student connects with it and uses it to solve a problem. In a study by van Gog, Post, ten Napel and Deijkers, students performed better when they used simpler objects (such as colored discs) than when they used more-complicated objects (such as animal figures). Although problems can be as simple as what to wear or eat, their solutions are still a cognitive process.

=== With manipulatives ===
With embodied design, mathematics is not only about correct answers but the process of finding them. Students are asked to communicate the process ("road map") they took to arrive at an answer. Typical problem-solving questions, such as "What needs do you have? What is the problem you are posed with? How did you collect information? How did you come to your conclusion? How could you have optimized your steps to reach that conclusion?" can be answered with manipulatives. One aim of problem solving in embodied design is to inspire students' creativity and curiosity, allowing personal connections to problems.

If students are given a problem which involves tactile manipulation, the learning process may be more meaningful. For example, students can learn to solve a Rubik's Cube puzzle by using a series of algorithms and steps. The process involves orientation, following directions and spatial cognition.

== Mathematical arts and crafts ==
One approach to embodied design in mathematics is the use of creative tasks, such as arts and crafts. When a student has mathematics in mind while creating a unique piece, they are engaged in mental and physical learning. The concept of area can be taught with an arts-and-crafts activity, where students find leaves and trace them on paper; they are then asked to determine the number of beans (or peas) required to cover the entire leaf area. The class can then be asked which student had the largest (or smallest) leaf, and the areas can be compared.

== Computer programming ==
With game consoles such as the Wii and PlayStation Move, students can understand how moving a gaming wand can change the effects on the screen. Researchers who developing programs in mathematics use embodied design and gaming principles to help students create and manipulate mathematical models. At the Embodied Design Research Laboratory, researchers created a game in which fifth-graders learn ratios by holding tennis balls in the air. When the tennis balls are held at a 1:2 ratio, the screen turns green.

Another embodied-design area related to programming is digital manipulatives. Some students feel weak in mathematics because it is not connected to the physical world, and digital manipulatives are being created to strengthen the connection between mathematics and the physical world.

When students use a touchscreen with their fingers, they use gestures to create (or use) virtual objects in the program. Computers can model environments where the students imagine their bodies to be, and the mind behaves as it would on a playground. Cell phones, pads and computers provide mathematically-enhanced models everywhere, exploring everyday experiences and the curriculum in more-abstract ways.
