= Vivian Grey =

Novel by Benjamin Disraeli

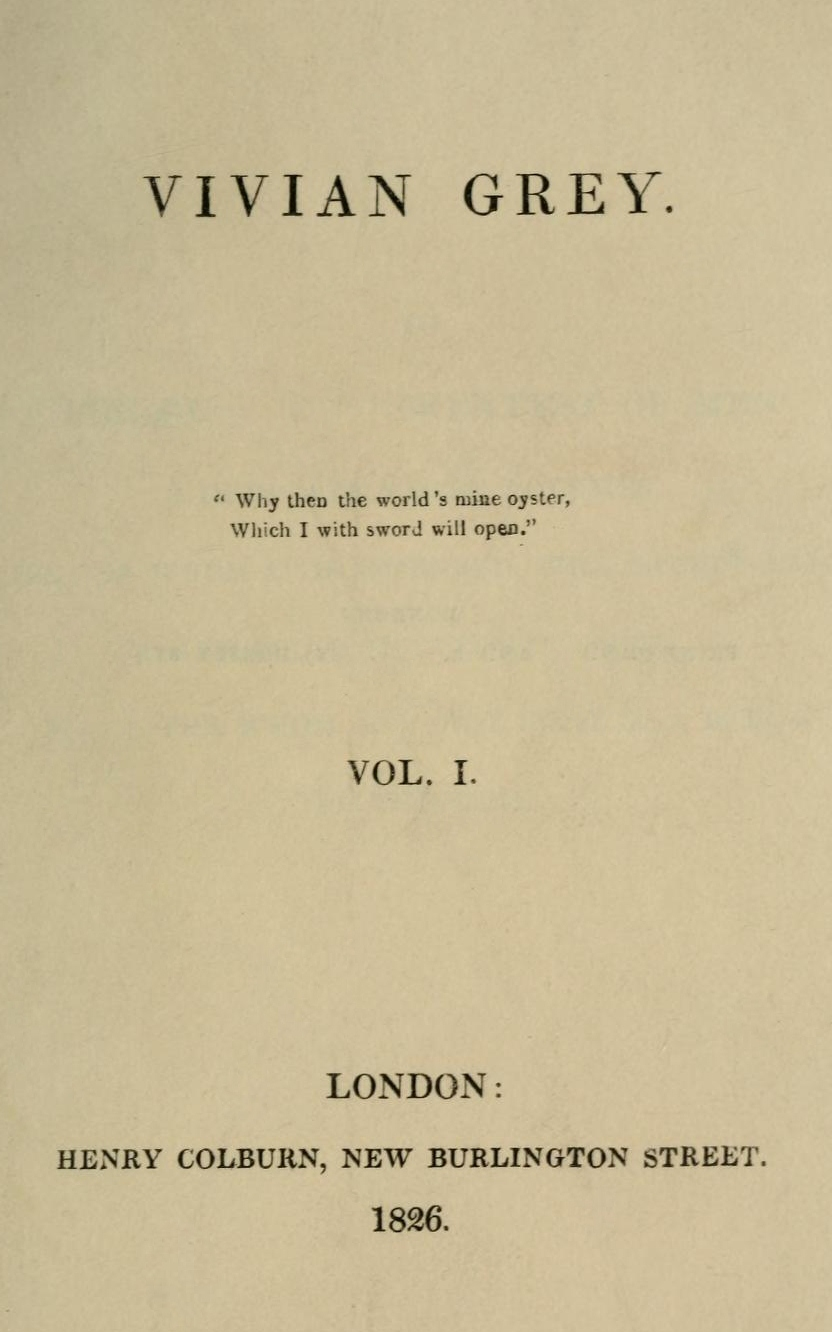
- First edition title page.
- Author: Benjamin Disraeli
- Language: English
- Genre: Silver fork novel
- Publisher: Henry Colburn
- Publication date: 1826
- Media type: Print

Vivian Grey is Benjamin Disraeli's first novel, published by Henry Colburn in 1826. Originally published anonymously, ostensibly by a so-called "man of fashion", part 1 caused a considerable sensation in London society. Contemporary reviewers, suspicious of the numerous solecisms contained within the text, eventually identified the young Disraeli (who did not move in high society) as the author. Disraeli continued the tale in a second volume, also of 1826, and three subsequent volumes in 1827. The form in which Vivian Grey is published now is the revised 1853 edition, which was severely expurgated and, according to critic Wendy Burton, lost much of the charm and freshness of the 1826 edition. The book is a frequent touchstone for discussions of Disraeli's political and literary career.

== Synopsis ==
Vivian Grey follows its eponymous hero from childhood through his attempt to succeed in the world of politics. The various systems of education through which Vivian Grey passes are analysed. The final system of education is experience, which proves the most instructive and the most shattering. Vivian chooses politics as his career and the novel traces his abortive attempt to gain political power through manipulation of an influential but ineffectual member of parliament. Vivian attempts to organise a party around the Marquess of Carabas, and is ultimately thwarted by his inexperience and naivete in dealing with the political machine. Vivian emerges as a misguided and arrogant young man who is ruthless in his pursuit of power. The catastrophe at the conclusion provides Vivian with a brutal but essential lesson in human behaviour. The novel offers a comment on the political and social temper of England in the early 1820s, and is specifically concerned with the question of personal advancement in a rigidly restrictive social structure. The plot is commonly considered to be a thinly-disguised re-telling of Disraeli's involvement with John Murray in the publication and failure of a new newspaper, The Representative.

== Criticism ==
When published in 1826, Vivian Grey received largely negative reviews. But it started a craze. Emerson wrote in his journal, in 1842, that "The young men are the readers & victims of Vivian Grey. Byron ruled for a time but Vivian rules longer."

Vivian Grey provided a natural beginning for students of Disraeli, and a frequent touchstone for discussions of Disraeli's political and literary career. This situation is possible only when the scholar accepts the protagonist of Vivian Grey as a replica of the author, revealed in uncounselled and damaging testimony. The details of the composition of the first part of the novel, and the role of Sara Austen in that composition, as well as awareness of publishing practices in the 1820s in London, challenge the assumption that Vivian Grey is synonymous with the young Benjamin Disraeli.

== Legacy ==
The British poet Mary Montgomerie Lamb took her pen name "Violet Fane" from a character in this novel.

Some commentators have suggested that Vivian Grey influenced Oscar Wilde in the writing of his only novel, The Picture of Dorian Gray.

Roy Horniman's Israel Rank reads Vivian Grey the night before his sentencing for murder in Horniman's novel Israel Rank: The Autobiography of a Criminal, the book that inspired the film Kind Hearts and Coronets.
