= Seaward 25 =

1980s US recreational keelboat

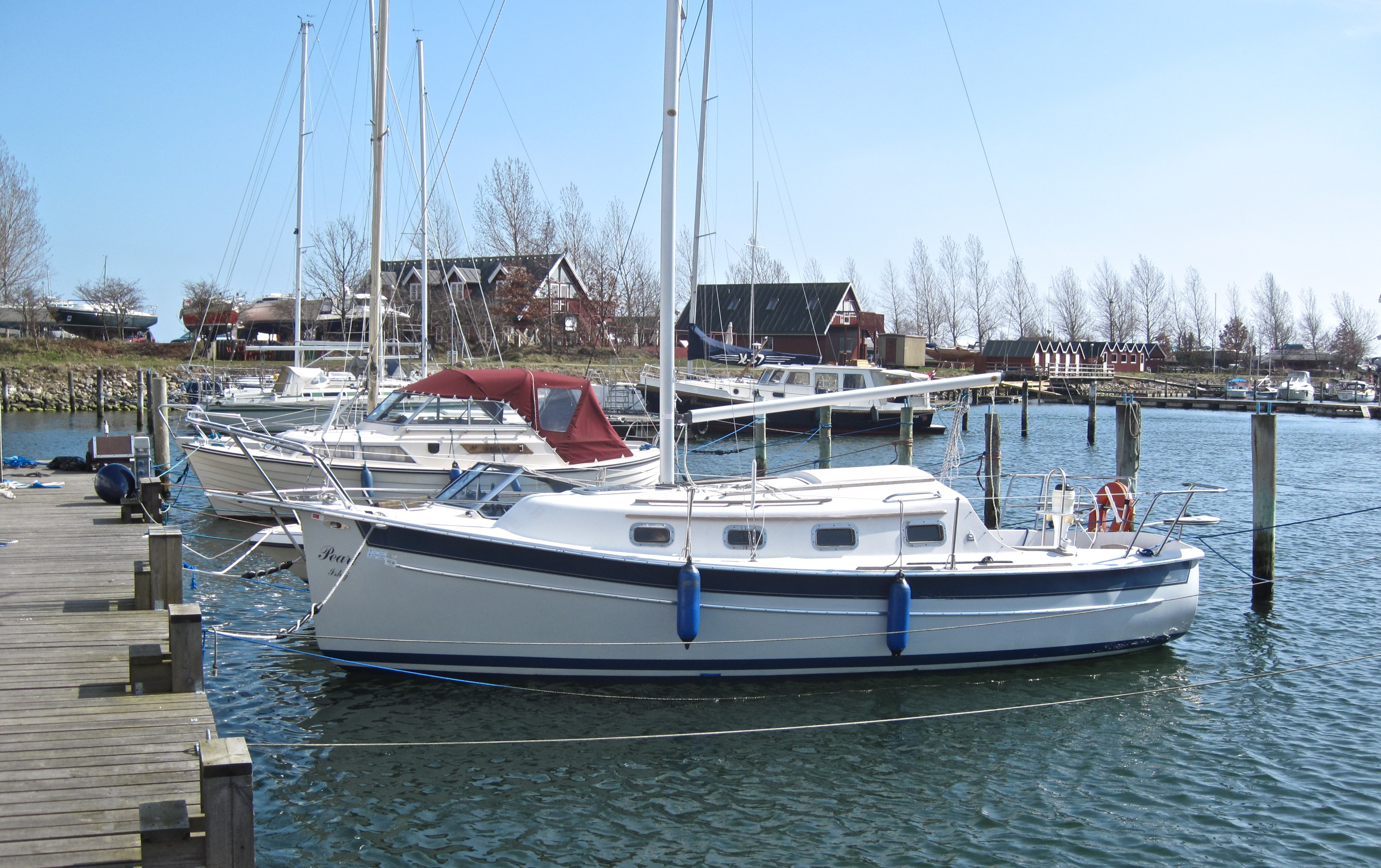

Development
- Designer: Nick Hake
- Location: United States
- Year: 1984
- No. built: 600
- Builder: Hake Yachts
- Role: Cruiser
- Name: Seaward 25

Boat
- Displacement: 3,600 lb (1,633 kg)
- Draft: 2.08 ft (0.63 m)

Hull
- Type: Monohull
- Construction: Fiberglass
- LOA: 26.75 ft (8.15 m)
- LWL: 23.00 ft (7.01 m)
- Beam: 8.33 ft (2.54 m)
- Engine: Yanmar diesel engine or outboard motor

Hull appendages
- Keel: fin keel
- Ballast: 1,200 lb (544 kg)
- Rudder: transom-mounted rudder

Rig
- Rig type: Bermuda rig
- I foretriangle height: 25.50 ft (7.77 m)
- J foretriangle base: 8.75 ft (2.67 m)
- P mainsail luff: 25.92 ft (7.90 m)
- E mainsail foot: 10.42 ft (3.18 m)

Sails
- Sailplan: Fractional rigged sloop
- Mainsail area: 135.04 sq ft (12.546 m^{2})
- Jib/genoa area: 111.56 sq ft (10.364 m^{2})
- Total sail area: 246.61 sq ft (22.911 m^{2})

Racing
- PHRF: 270

The Seaward 25 is a recreational keelboat built by Hake Yachts of Stuart, Florida starting in 1984, with 600 boats completed before production ended. The company later re-located to Largo, Florida, United States and was renamed the Starboard Yacht Company, when they bought out Island Packet Yachts.

== Design ==
The Seaward 25 is a recreational keelboat, built predominantly of fiberglass. It has a fractional sloop rig with aluminum spars. The hull has plumb stem and a plumb transom, with a transom-hung rudder controlled by a wheel and a fixed fin keel. It displaces 3,600 lb (1,633 kg) and carries 1,200 lb (544 kg) of ballast.

The boat has a draft of 2.08 ft (0.63 m) with the standard shoal draft keel fitted or 4.17 ft (1.27 m) with the deep "bluewater" keel.

The boat may be optionally fitted with a Japanese Yanmar 1 GM10 or Westerbeke 20B diesel inboard engine or a small outboard motor for docking and maneuvering.

The design has sleeping accommodation for four people, with a double "V"-berth in the bow cabin, a straight settee in the main cabin and an aft berth on the port side. The galley is located on the port side just forward of the companionway ladder. The galley is angled and is equipped with a two-burner stove and a sink. The head is located on the starboard side and includes a hot water shower. Cabin headroom is 63 in (160 cm)

The design has a PHRF racing average handicap of 270 and a hull speed of 6.4 kn (11.9 km/h).

== Reception ==
In a 2000 review in Sailing Magazine, writer John Kretschmer, wrote, "we hauled up the main and optional 135-percent genoa and, with a joy that only small boats provide, sailed away from the dock. While the Seaward 25 offers the ease of handling and overall lack of fuss associated with most small boats, it also has several features usually reserved for larger boats. From wheel steering to diesel power to hot and cold pressure water to the surprisingly comfortable interior, the Seaward has the feel of a larger boat. I could happily spend a few weeks aboard a Seaward 25 exploring a bit of thin turquoise water in the Bahamas."

Darrell Nicholson, the editor of Practical Sailor, did a review of the boat in 2003. He described sailing it, writing, "we sailed in 8-10 knots of wind, flying a 135-percent genoa, the maximum recommended by the designer, and full mainsail. The helm was responsive, and the boat quickly accelerated with the occasional puff of breeze. In a steady breeze we sailed at 4-5 knots on a reach. Hardening up and pushing to within 45 degrees of the wind, speed dropped by about a knot. We couldn’t record precise speeds because of a dirty speedo impeller. In fact, it was hard to get an accurate feel for her performance altogether, because the river current flows into the prevailing winds. However, sailing cross-current on a beam reach, she showed good speed, helm balance, and tracking. We’d like to take a longer sail to weather in open water. She did provide a comfortable ride, especially when compared to water- ballasted trailerables, and was easy to sail with little muscular effort."

In a 2010 review Steve Henkel wrote, "[of its competitors] the Seaward 25 has by far the highest Space Index and the most headroom, as well as by far the worst PHRF rating, Maybe that's because all the comp[etitor]s except the Seaward 25 were designed to do well on the race course, whereas the Seaward design was aimed squarely at cruising comfort and space, with a mere passing wave at speed. (The inboard can always be turned on.) The design evolved over a period of time; the model shown here is the last of a series of roughly 24-footers which were originally produced starting in 1984, and changed a bit every few years until the series was discontinued in 2003 ... the boat has several nice features, including a larger than usual galley area and a head with hot shower aft next to the companionway ladder. (Pressure hot and cold water is available for those who opted for the Yanmar 1GM10 or Westerbeke 20B diesel inboard.) Stern quarter seats are popular with the younger set. Worst features: None noted."
