= Slipper 17 =

1980s recreational keelboat

Development
- Designer: Nick Hake
- Location: United States
- Year: 1981
- Builders: Starboard Yacht Company; Hake Yachts
- Role: Cruiser
- Name: Slipper 17

Boat
- Displacement: 1,250 lb (567 kg)
- Draft: 1.58 ft (0.48 m)

Hull
- Type: monohull
- Construction: fiberglass
- LOA: 16.83 ft (5.13 m)
- LWL: 14.83 ft (4.52 m)
- Beam: 8.00 ft (2.44 m)
- Engine: outboard motor

Hull appendages
- Keel: fin keel
- Ballast: 425 lb (193 kg)
- Rudder: transom-mounted rudder

Rig
- Rig type: Bermuda rig

Sails
- Sailplan: fractional rigged sloop
- Total sail area: 150.00 sq ft (13.935 m^{2})

The Slipper 17 is a recreational keelboat designed by Nick Hake first built in 1981. The Slipper 17 design was developed into the Seaward Fox in 1993.

== Production ==
The design was built by the Starboard Yacht Company in the United States from 1981 until 1991, but it is now out of production. The company and production was later taken over by Hake Yachts.

== Design ==
The Slipper 17 is a recreational keelboat, built predominantly of fiberglass, with wood trim. It has a fractional sloop rig or optional catboat rig, a nearly plumb stem, a slightly angled transom, a transom-hung rudder controlled by a tiller and a fixed shoal draft fin keel or keel and centerboard. It displaces 1,250 lb (567 kg) and carries 425 lb (193 kg) of ballast.

The boat has a draft of 1.58 ft (0.48 m) with the standard fixed keel, while the centerboard-equipped version has a draft of 2.58 ft (0.79 m) with the centerboard extended and 1.58 ft (0.48 m) with it retracted, allowing operation in shallow water, or ground transportation on a trailer.

The boat is normally fitted with a small 3 to 6 hp (2 to 4 kW) outboard motor for docking and maneuvering.

The design has sleeping accommodation for four people, with a double "V"-berth in the bow cabin and two straight settee berths in the main cabin. The galley is located on both sides just aft of the bow cabin. The galley is equipped with a sink to port. The head is located in the bow cabin, centered aft, under the "V"-berth. Cabin headroom is 51 in (130 cm).

The design has a hull speed of 5.2 kn (9.6 km/h).

== Reception ==
In a 2010 review Steve Henkel wrote, "Nick Hake started Starboard Yacht Company in 1979 with the cute little Slipper 17. Over the years the dimensions varied a bit, and so did the rig (cat or sloop), the deck configuration (deckhouse or flush deck) and the name of the builder (Starboard, Seaward, Hake Yachts) but with Nick Hake always in control ... Best features: Relatively wide beam gives her more space inside compared to her comp[etitor]s. She was available over the years in several different layouts, including two-berth, three-berth, and ... four-berth model ... (Two berths is probably the maximum most sailors would want to try, except for those with very small children.) Worst features: The early models had a rudder with too little area for quick manueverability ... Shallow draft, whether in the plain keel model (1' 7" draft, shown here) or the centerboarder, is insufficient for good upwind performance. Sail area is on the low side ..."
