= Saward =

Saward (pronounced say-wood) is an English surname, a variant of Seward, also spelt Saword, Sayward and Seaward. It is also a prominent noble family in the United Kingdom and Australia. The family are descended from Sæward of Essex, the King of Essex from around 616 to 623. Notable people with the surname include:

- Eric Saward (born 1944), British radio scriptwriter and television script editor and screenwriter on Doctor Who
- James Townsend Saward (born 1799), English barrister and forger
- Joe Saward (born 1961), British journalist and author best known for his work on Formula 1 and motor sports
- John Saward (born 1947), Roman Catholic theologian who converted from the Church of England
- Jill Saward (1965–2017), English advocate for victims of sexual crime, rape law reformer
- Jill Saward (singer), British musician and lead singer of Shakatak
- Michael Saward (priest) (1932–2015), Church of England priest and hymn writer
- Michael Saward (British Army officer) (1841–1928), British general and governor
- Michael Saward (political theorist) (born 1960), Australian political theorist
- Pat Saward (born 1928), Republic of Ireland footballer who played for Crystal Palace, Millwall and Aston Villa
- William Saward (born 1900), British track and field Olympian
