= Sowards =

Sowards is a surname. Notable people with the surname include:

- Bob Sowards (born 1968), American professional Golfer
- Jack B. Sowards (1929–2007), American Screenwriter

== See also ==
- Soward
