= Island Packet 29 =

Sailboat class

Development
- Designer: Robert K. Johnson
- Location: United States
- Year: 1991
- No. built: 64
- Builder: Island Packet Yachts
- Role: Cruiser
- Name: Island Packet 29

Boat
- Displacement: 10,900 lb (4,944 kg)
- Draft: 4.25 ft (1.30 m)

Hull
- Type: Monohull
- Construction: Fiberglass
- LOA: 29.00 ft (8.84 m)
- LWL: 25.58 ft (7.80 m)
- Beam: 10.83 ft (3.30 m)
- Engine: Inboard diesel engine

Hull appendages
- Keel: long keel
- Ballast: 4,800 lb (2,177 kg)
- Rudder: keel-mounted rudder

Rig
- Rig type: Cutter rig

Sails
- Sailplan: Cutter rigged sloop
- Total sail area: 491 sq ft (45.6 m^{2})

The Island Packet 29 is an American sailboat that was designed by Robert K. Johnson as a cruiser and first built in 1981.

== Production ==
The design was built by Island Packet Yachts in the United States, who produced 64 examples of the design between 1991 and 1997, but it is now out of production.

== Design ==
The Island Packet 29 is a recreational keelboat, built predominantly of fiberglass, with teak and holly wood trim. It has a cutter rig or an optional masthead sloop rig, a raked stem, a vertical transom, a keel-mounted rudder controlled by a wheel with rack and pinion steering and a fixed long keel or optional fixed long keel with a centerboard. It displaces 10,900 lb (4,944 kg) and carries 4,800 lb (2,177 kg) of ballast.

The keel-equipped version of the boat has a draft of 4.25 ft (1.30 m), while the centerboard-equipped version has a draft of 7.25 ft (2.21 m) with the centerboard extended and 3.42 ft (1.04 m) with it retracted.

The boat is fitted with an inboard diesel engine. The fuel tank holds 23 U.S. gallons (87 L; 19 imp gal) and the fresh water tank has a capacity of 45 U.S. gallons (170 L; 37 imp gal).

The U-shaped galley is located at the bottom of the companionway stairs on the starboard side and includes a gimballed two-burner liquid petroleum gas stove and a stainless steel sink with pressurized hot water. The head is located in the bow, just aft of the forward "V"-berth and it includes a shower. Additional sleeping accommodation includes a large cabin quarter berth aft, opposite the galley.

Ventilation is provided by nine opening ports, five deck hatches and two Dorade vents.

The boat has a bowsprit and the mast has twin backstays and a topping lift. The spars are all aluminum. The halyards are internally-mounted and dedicated halyard winches are provided. Additional winches are mounted for the jib sheets. The jib has Harken roller furling, while the mainsail has automatic winch reefing. There is a mainsheet traveler and a boom vang with an integral preventer is provided.

The factory standard sails provided included the main and a 125% genoa. The cutter sail, including a foresail boom and rigging were a factory option.

== Operational history ==
In a review, Richard Sherwood noted, "the sleeping, fuel, and water capacity are indicators of the cruising capability of the 29, as is the full keel."

The designer noted that an Island Packet 29 sailed from North America to Ireland on the northern route, under bare poles, covering 150 nmi (278 km) per day.

== See also ==
- List of sailing boat types
