= Rep =

Rep, REP, or a variant may refer to:

== As a word ==
- Rep (fabric), a ribbed woven fabric made from various materials
- Rep (TV series), a 1982 British comedy series
- The Rep, an entertainment guide published by the Arizona Republic 1997–2006

== Surname ==
- Johnny Rep (born 1951), Dutch footballer
- Robert Rep (born 1965), Dutch politician

== Abbreviation and acronyms ==
- Reasonable expectation of privacy, a legal test in US constitutional law
- Rede dos Emissores Portugueses, an amateur radio organization in Portugal
- Régiment Étranger de Parachutistes, or 1st Foreign Parachute Regiment, a French Foreign Legion unit
- Remedial education program, a type of instructional program
- Repertory theatre
- Repertory Philippines
- Repetition (disambiguation)
- Representative (disambiguation)
- Republic
- Republicans for Environmental Protection, a US Republican Party organization
- Reputation
- Reputation (album)
- Resident Evil Portable, a video game for the PlayStation Portable in the Resident Evil franchise
- Retail Electricity Provider, in electricity retailing in the United States
- Routledge Encyclopedia of Philosophy
- The Republicans (Germany), a political party in Germany
- Siem Reap International Airport (IATA code), in Cambodia
- Repertories (archival records) of the Court of Aldermen of the City of London, used in footnotes
- Repsol, BMAD symbol

=== In science and engineering ===
- Rab escort protein
- Radioisotope electric propulsion, a proposed use for radioisotope thermoelectric generators
- Reuse-release Equivalence Principle, a principle of object-oriented design
- REP, an x86 assembly language instruction (abbreviation of repeat)
- REP, a French aircraft and aero engine manufacturer owned by Robert Esnault-Pelterie
- RE/P, formally Recording Engineer/Producer, a music industry magazine for the recording studio
- Robots exclusion protocol, or robots exclusion standard, a website communications standard
- Röntgen equivalent physical, a unit of exposure to radiation
