= Seaward 26RK =

2005 US recreational keelboat

Development
- Designer: Nick Hake
- Location: United States
- Year: 2005
- Builder: Hake Yachts
- Role: Cruiser
- Name: Seaward 26RK

Boat
- Displacement: 3,800 lb (1,724 kg)
- Draft: 6.00 ft (1.83 m) with keel down

Hull
- Type: monohull
- Construction: fiberglass
- LOA: 28.42 ft (8.66 m)
- LWL: 25.67 ft (7.82 m)
- Beam: 8.33 ft (2.54 m)
- Engine: outboard motor

Hull appendages
- Keel: lifting keel
- Ballast: 1,200 lb (544 kg)
- Rudders: lifting, transom-mounted rudder

Rig
- Rig type: Bermuda rig

Sails
- Sailplan: fractional rigged sloop
- Total sail area: 280.00 sq ft (26.013 m^{2})

The Seaward 26RK is a recreational keelboat. It is sometimes referred to as the Hake 26RK. It was built in the United States, starting in 2005, but it is now out of production. The boat was built by Island Packet Yachts, owned by Hake Marine.

== Design ==
The Seaward 26RK is a recreational keelboat, built predominantly of fiberglass, with wood trim. The deck is cored with Divinycell foam. It has a fractional sloop rig; a nearly plumb stem; an open, walk-through transom; a vertically retractable, transom-hung rudder controlled by a tiller or optional wheel and a retractable, lead-cored, lifting keel. It displaces 3,800 lb (1,724 kg) and carries 1,200 lb (544 kg) of lead ballast.

The boat has a draft of 6.00 ft (1.83 m) with the keel extended and 1.25 ft (0.38 m) with it retracted, allowing operation in shallow water or ground transportation on a trailer.

The boat is normally fitted with a small outboard motor for docking and maneuvering, but a Yanmar inboard diesel engine was a factory option.

The design has sleeping accommodation for four people, with a bow cabin "V"-berth and two main cabin settee berths, around a flip-up table. The galley is located on the port side just forward of the companionway ladder. The galley is equipped with a single-burner stove, icebox and a sink. The head is portable type, with an enclosing door optional. Cabin headroom is 70 in (178 cm).

The design has a hull speed of 6.66 kn (12.33 km/h).

== Reception ==
In a 2005 review in Practical Sailor, Darrell Nicholson wrote, "this boat reflects a thoughtful approach to design that increases user comfort, though its sail plan may disappoint more performance-minded sailors. The additional space in the cockpit and waterline length are a plus, especially since they add only 200 lbs. to the displacement. And we think owners of the 26RK will be pleased at the boat’s ability to gunkhole in bodies of water where deeper draft vessels would be restricted."
