= Hake Yachts =

Sailboat builder

- Company type: Privately held company
- Industry: Boat building
- Founded: 1973
- Founder: Nick Hake
- Headquarters: Carmel, Indiana, United States
- Products: Sailboats
- Owner: Darrell and Leslie Allen

Hake Yachts, also called Seaward Yachts, was an American boat builder based in Carmel, Indiana. The company specialized in the design and manufacture of fiberglass sailboats.

The company was founded in 1973 by boat designer Nick Hake, a graduate of the Milwaukee School of Engineering.

== History ==
After starting building sailing dinghies, the first keelboat design produced was the Seaward 23 in 1984. The company also took over the Starboard Yacht Company, also founded by Hake, which had been producing his Slipper 17 pocket cruiser design since 1981.

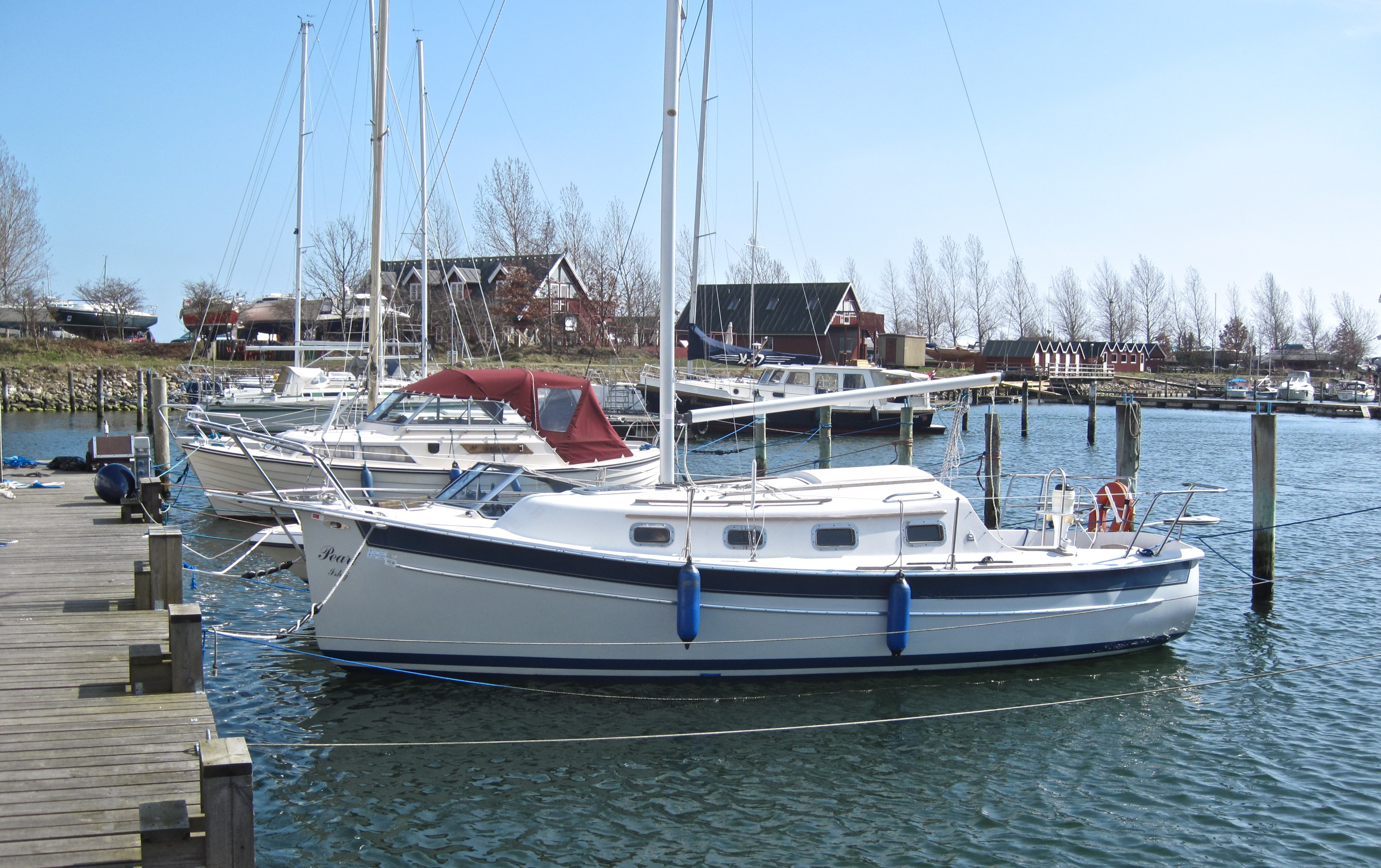
Seaward 25

Throughout the 1980s and 1990s the company produced the Seaward line of sailboats, including the Seaward 25 and Seaward 22. in his In a 2010 book, The Sailor's Book of Small Cruising Sailboats, Steve Henkel praised the construction quality of the boats the company built and their choice of high-end hardware.

In 1993 Hake sold the company to a group of investors from Philadelphia. The new owners quickly ran into issues maintaining product quality and the boats suffered from poor construction. After two years they sold the company back to Hake.

By 2005 the company was focused on two designs, the Seaward 26RK and the Seaward Eagle.

In 2016, under the name Hake Marine, the company bought Island Packet Yachts and Blue Jacket Yachts and began combining operations at the Island Packet facility in Largo, Florida.

In 2016 the company was producing three designs, the Seaward 26RK, the Seaward 32RK and the Seaward 46RK.

In January 2017 the company was bought by Darrell and Leslie Allen. Nick Hake went on to found a new company, NH Designs, which specializes in powerboat and sailboat brokerage, transport, repair and consultation.

By 2022 the Seaward Yachts company website redirected to the Island Packet Yachts website and that company no longer offered any Seaward series boats for sale.

== Boats ==
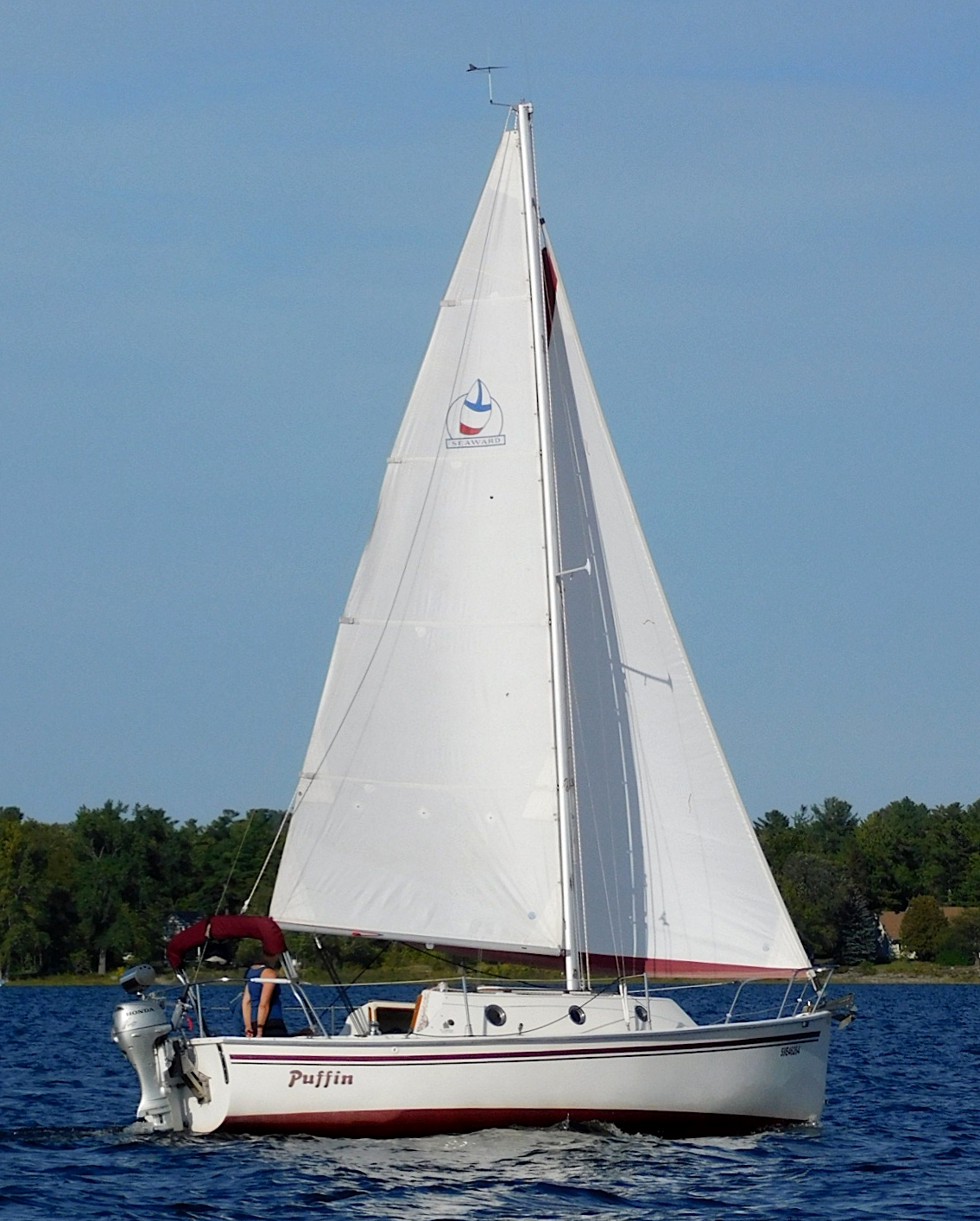
Seaward 22

Summary of boats built by Hake Yachts:

- Slipper 17 - 1981
- Seaward 23 - 1984
- Seaward 24 - 1984
- Seaward 25 - 1984
- Seaward 22 - 1985
- Seaward Fox - 1993
- Seaward Eagle - 1996
- Seaward 26RK - 2005
- Seaward 32RK - 2009
- Seaward 46RK - 2012

== See also ==
- List of sailboat designers and manufacturers
