= Seaward 46RK =

2012 US recreational keelboat

Development
- Designer: Nick Hake
- Location: United States
- Year: 2012
- Builder: Hake Yachts
- Role: Cruiser
- Name: Seaward 46RK

Boat
- Displacement: 23,000 lb (10,433 kg)
- Draft: 7.00 ft (2.13 m) with keel down

Hull
- Type: monohull
- Construction: fiberglass
- LOA: 48.00 ft (14.63 m)
- LWL: 44.83 ft (13.66 m)
- Beam: 13.25 ft (4.04 m)
- Engine: Two Yanmar 54 hp (40 kW) diesel engines

Hull appendages
- Keel: lifting keel with weighted bulb
- Ballast: 7,500 lb (3,402 kg)
- Rudders: Dual, lifting, transom-mounted rudders

Rig
- Rig type: Bermuda rig

Sails
- Sailplan: masthead sloop
- Total sail area: 1,006.00 sq ft (93.460 m^{2})

The Seaward 46RK is an American sailboat that was designed by Nick Hake as a cruiser and first built in 2012.

== Production ==
The design was built by Hake Yachts in the United States, starting in 2012, but it is now out of production.

== Design ==
The Seaward 46RK is a recreational keelboat, built predominantly of fiberglass, with wood trim. It has a masthead sloop rig; a plumb stem; an open, walk-through, reverse transom; twin transom-hung rudders controlled by a wheel and an electrically actuated lifting keel with a weighted bulb. The boat has a wheelhouse with duplicate electronic helm and engine controls, as well as a navigation station. It displaces 23,000 lb (10,433 kg) and carries 7,500 lb (3,402 kg) of ballast.

The design has a draft of 7.00 ft (2.13 m) with the keel extended and 2.42 ft (0.74 m) with it retracted, allowing operation in shallow water. The bulb keel fully retracts into a recess in the hull, allowing the boat to be beached.

The boat is fitted with a two Japanese Yanmar 54 hp (40 kW) diesel engines or a single Yanmar 75 hp (56 kW) turbo diesel 4JH4-TE for docking and maneuvering, with the propellers protected by skegs. The fuel tank holds 180 U.S. gallons (680 L; 150 imp gal), the fresh water tank has a capacity of 180 U.S. gallons (680 L; 150 imp gal) and the holding tank has a capacity of 70 U.S. gallons (260 L; 58 imp gal).

For sailing downwind the boat may be equipped with a roller furling asymmetrical spinnaker on the forward forestay and a self-tacking jib on the aft forestay. The mainsheet is mounted on a stainless steel arch.

The design has sleeping accommodation for eight people, with a queen-sized double "V"-berth in the bow cabin, a main cabin dinette table that drops down to form a double berth and two aft cabins each with a double berth. The galley is located on the port side just forward of the companionway ladder. The galley is equipped with a two-burner stove, refrigerator, freezer and a double sink. There are two heads, one just aft of the bow cabin and one on the starboard side aft.

The design has a hull speed of 8.97 kn (16.61 km/h).

== Reception ==
In a 2013 review by Mark Pillsbury for Cruising World, he wrote, "throughout, workmanship appeared top notch. If your sailing grounds include shallow bays and sounds or if you dream, say, of the Bahamas' turquoise waters, the Seaward 46RK might just do the trick."

A 2014 review in Sail Magazine, by Peter Nielsen concluded, "though it’s certainly capable of offshore cruising, the 46RK’s natural environment is the shallow waters of the East Coast, Florida Keys and Bahamas. With a minimum draft of well under three feet, it will out-gunkhole most cruising catamarans and open up cruising grounds that are otherwise out of reach. Its very quirkiness is a big part of its appeal."
