= Michael Saward (political theorist) =

- Born: 1 September 1960 (age 66)
- Education: University of Essex
- Scientific career
- Workplaces: Centre for Citizenship, Identities and Governance Open University
- Thesis: Co-option and legitimacy: the varieties and consequences of formal incorporation (1980)

Michael Saward (born 1 September 1960), is an Australian and British political theorist and professor emeritus of politics and international studies at the University of Warwick, He was formerly reader in politics at Royal Holloway, University of London, professor and head of department in politics and international studies at the Open University,and professor of politics and international studies at the University of Warwick.

At University of Warwick he was a Leverhulme Major Research Fellow, 2016–19, and was Director of the Midlands Graduate School, 2013-16.

== Biography ==
Saward was born in Tasmania, Australia. He earned Bachelor of Arts with Honours from Australian National University, and completed his PhD at the University of Essex in 1989. His doctoral research examined co-option and political legitimacy.

== Academic career ==
Saward began his academic career at Royal Holloway, University of London, where he taught democratic theory, comparative politics, green political theory, and approaches to analyzing the social world. In 2000, he joined the Open University as a reader in politics. In 2001 he became a professor of politics and international studies and subsequently served twice as head of department. At the Open University, he led the development of large-scale distance-learning courses in politics and held research leadership roles at the Centre for Citizenship, Identities and Governance. His research focused on political representation and European citizenship.

Saward joined the University of Warwick in October 2012 as professor of politics and international studies. From 2013 to 2016, he directed the Midlands Graduate School, an Economic and Social Research Council Doctoral Training Centre. He held a Leverhulme Trust Major Research Fellowship from 2016 to 2019. He became professor emeritus at Warwick in September 2026.

He also held visiting professorships at the National Autonomous University of Mexico, the Federal University of Minas Gerais in Brazil and the Australian National University. From January to May 2027, he will take up the position of International Francqui Professor at Vrije Universiteit Brussel and Université libre de Bruxelles.

== Research ==
Saward's research focuses on contemporary democratic theory, particularly political representation, citizenship, democratic design, and the ways in which political ideas are expressed and practised. His works examine how representatives perform claims to speak or act for others, how such claims are recognized or contested, and how democratic representation operates in and beyond elections and formal political institutions.

His book The Terms of Democracy (1998) offered an interpretation of democracy’s meaning, value, and demands. In Democracy (2003), he discussed the concept's principal theoretical and political dimensions. He also edited Democracy: Critical Concepts in Political Science (2007) and Democratic Innovation: Deliberation, Representation and Association (2000).

In The Representative Claim (2010), Saward examined political representation as a process in which individuals and groups make claims to represent particular constituencies or interests. The book also focuses electoral and institutional accounts of representation to consider how representative claims are constructed and received. It received the American Political Science Association's George H. Hallett Award in 2020. Saward's later work has explored the relationship between representation, performance and political agency.His book Making Representations: Claim, Counterclaim and the Politics of Acting for Others (2020) examined the processes through which representative claims are made, challenged, and evaluated. His research has also considered how representation changes across political contexts and how people and groups excluded from conventional institutions seek political recognition.

In Democratic Design (2021), Saward examined the design of democratic institutions and arrangements, drawing on design studies to consider their relationship with democratic values and practices. The book received the Political Studies Association's W. J. M. Mackenzie Book Prize in 2023.

His research has also covered green political theory, European citizenship, political performance, and democratic theory. He co-edited Enacting European Citizenship (2013) with Engin Isin, which examined citizenship through political and social practices. With Shirin Rai, Milija Gluhovic, and Silvija Jestrovic, he co-edited The Oxford Handbook of Politics and Performance (2021), an interdisciplinary study of performance in political life across different countries and contexts.

In 2024, Saward co-edited Claiming and Contesting Representation in Mexico: Meanings, Practices and Settings with Fernando Castaños and Silvia Inclán, and Bodies, Spaces, Claims: The Theory and Practice of Performing Political Representation with Paula Diehl, he examined political representation in different cultural settings and through embodied, spatial, and performative practices.

== Awards and honours ==
- George H. Hallett Award (2020), American Political Science Association, for The Representative Claim.
- W. J. M. Mackenzie Book Prize (2023), Political Studies Association, for Democratic Design.

== Selected publications ==
=== Books ===
- Saward, Michael (9 July 1998). The Terms of Democracy. Wiley. ISBN 978-0-7456-1991-0.
- Saward, Michael (6 May 2010). The Representative Claim. Oxford University Press. doi:10.1093/acprof:oso/9780199579389.001.0001. ISBN 978-0-19-957938-9.
- Isin, Engin F.; Saward, Michael, eds. (18 April 2013). Enacting European Citizenship. Cambridge University Press. doi:10.1017/cbo9781139524025. ISBN 978-1-139-52402-5.
- Saward, Michael (24 July 2020). Making representations : claim, counterclaim and the politics of acting for others. London: ECPR Press and Rowman and Littlefield International. ISBN 978-1-78552-346-5.
- Saward, Michael (26 January 2021), "The Work of Democratic Design", Democratic Design, Oxford University PressOxford, doi:10.1093/oso/9780198867227.003.0005, ISBN 978-0-19-886722-7

=== edited books ===
- Saward, Michael, ed. (2000). Democratic innovation: Deliberation, representation and association. London and New York. ISBN 978-0-415-40657-4.
- Andrews, Geoff; Saward, Michael, eds. (2005). Living political ideas. Power, dissent, equality: Understanding contemporary politics (1. publ ed.). Edinburgh: Edinburgh University Press. ISBN 978-0-7486-1972-6.
- Rai, Shirin; Gluhovic, Milija; Jestrovic, Silvija; Saward, Michael, eds. (10 March 2021). The Oxford Handbook of Politics and Performance. Oxford University Press. doi:10.1093/oxfordhb/9780190863456.001.0001. ISBN 978-0-19-086345-6.
- Castaños, Fernando; Inclán, Silvia; Saward, Michael, eds. (25 March 2024). Claiming and Contesting Representation in Mexico. Bristol University Press. doi:10.51952/9781529236262. ISBN 978-1-5292-3626-2.
- Diehl, Paula; Saward, Michael, eds. (2024). Bodies, spaces, claims: the theory and practice of performing political representation. Oxford ; New York: Oxford University Press. ISBN 978-0-19-893490-5. OCLC 1443069663.

=== Selected journal articles ===
- Saward, Michael (27 July 2006). "The Representative Claim". Contemporary Political Theory. 5 (3): 297–318. doi:10.1057/palgrave.cpt.9300234. ISSN 1470-8914.
- van Biezen, Ingrid; Saward, Michael (26 February 2008). "Democratic Theorists and Party Scholars: Why They Don't Talk to Each Other, and Why They Should". Perspectives on Politics. 6 (1). doi:10.1017/s1537592708080043. ISSN 1537-5927.
- Saward, Michael (19 January 2009). "Authorisation and Authenticity: Representation and the Unelected*". Journal of Political Philosophy. 17 (1): 1–22. doi:10.1111/j.1467-9760.2008.00309.x. ISSN 0963-8016.
- Saward, Michael (16 April 2012). "The dynamics of European citizenship: Enactment, extension and assertion". Comparative European Politics. 11 (1): 49–69. doi:10.1057/cep.2012.2. ISSN 1472-4790.
- SAWARD, MICHAEL (2014). "Shape-Shifting Representation". American Political Science Review. 108 (4): 723–736. doi:10.1017/s0003055414000471. ISSN 0003-0554.
- Saward, Michael (2 September 2024). "Tate Liverpool's Democracies : curatorial methodologies for exploring democracy". International Journal of Social Research Methodology. 28 (4): 411–424. doi:10.1080/13645579.2024.2396370. ISSN 1364-5579.
- Saward, Michael (2026). "Design/Democracy". Design Issues. 42 (1): 42–55. doi:10.1162/desi.a.707. ISSN 0747-9360.
- Hendriks, Carolyn M.; Saward, Michael (10 August 2026). "Representative-capacity-making: The strategic backstage work of political representation". Political Studies 00323217261469290. doi:10.1177/00323217261469290. hdl:1885/733815196. ISSN 0032-3217.

== See also ==
- Democracy
- Representation (politics)
- Representative democracy
- Political philosophy
