= Seaward 32RK =

2006 US recreational keelboat

Development
- Designer: Nick Hake
- Location: United States
- Year: 2006
- Builder: Hake Yachts
- Role: Cruiser
- Name: Seaward 32RK

Boat
- Displacement: 8,300 lb (3,765 kg)
- Draft: 6.42 ft (1.96 m) with keel down

Hull
- Type: monohull
- Construction: fiberglass
- LOA: 34.58 ft (10.54 m)
- LWL: 30.58 ft (9.32 m)
- Beam: 10.50 ft (3.20 m)
- Engine: Yanmar 3YM30 29 hp (22 kW) diesel engine

Hull appendages
- Keel: lifting keel with weighted bulb
- Ballast: 2,400 lb (1,089 kg)
- Rudders: transom-mounted, lifting rudder

Rig
- Rig type: Bermuda rig

Sails
- Sailplan: masthead sloop
- Total sail area: 460.00 sq ft (42.735 m^{2})

The Seaward 32RK is a recreational keelboat. It is also sometimes called the Hake 32RK. It was built by Hake Yachts in the United States, starting in 2006, but it is now out of production.

== Design ==
The Seaward 32RK is a recreational keelboat, built predominantly of fiberglass, with wood trim. It has a masthead sloop rig, with a bowsprit; a plumb stem; a vertical, walk-through transom; a lifting, transom-hung rudder controlled by a wheel and a lifting keel with a weighted bulb, actuated by an electric winch. It displaces 8,300 lb (3,765 kg) and carries 2,400 lb (1,089 kg) of ballast.

The walk-through transom has a swimming ladder and a hot and cold shower.

The boat has a draft of 6.42 ft (1.96 m) with the keel extended and 1.67 ft (0.51 m) with it retracted, allowing operation in shallow water or ground transportation on a trailer.

The boat is fitted with a Japanese Yanmar 3YM30 29 hp (22 kW) diesel engine for docking and maneuvering. The fuel tank holds 20 U.S. gallons (76 L; 17 imp gal) and the fresh water tank has a capacity of 65 U.S. gallons (250 L; 54 imp gal).

The design has sleeping accommodation for six people, with a double "V"-berth in the bow cabin, a U-shaped dinette table that forms a double berth and an aft cabin with a double berth on the port side. The galley is located on the starboard side just forward of the companionway ladder. The galley is L-shaped and is equipped with a two-burner stove and a double sink. A navigation station is opposite the galley, on the starboard side. The head is located just aft of the bow cabin on the port side.

The design has a hull speed of 7.41 kn (13.72 km/h).

== Reception ==
In a 2020 review in Blue Water Sailing, Sandy Parks wrote, " The 32RK has one signature design feature that makes it uniquely suitable for cruising in areas with a lot of shallow water and for sailors who want to trailer their boats. The RK in its name stands for 'retracting keel' which enables you to lower the keel to whatever depth you want, within reason, and to raise it again when the water starts to get thin. A simple electric winch raises and lowers the keel."
