= Seaward Eagle =

1990s US recreational keelboat

Development
- Designer: Nick Hake
- Location: United States
- Year: 1996
- Builder: Hake Yachts
- Role: Cruiser
- Name: Seaward Eagle

Boat
- Displacement: 7,700 lb (3,493 kg)
- Draft: 3.50 ft (1.07 m)

Hull
- Type: monohull
- Construction: fiberglass
- LOA: 34.58 ft (10.54 m)
- LWL: 30.58 ft (9.32 m)
- Beam: 10.50 ft (3.20 m)
- Engine: inboard engine

Hull appendages
- Keel: wing keel
- Ballast: 3,000 lb (1,361 kg)
- Rudder: internally-mounted spade-type rudder

Rig
- Rig type: Bermuda rig

Sails
- Sailplan: fractional rigged sloop
- Total sail area: 480.00 sq ft (44.593 m^{2})

The Seaward Eagle, sometimes called the Seaward Eagle 32, is a recreational keelboat designed by Nick Hake and first built in 1996.

== Production ==
The design was built by Hake Yachts in the United States, starting in 1996, but it is now out of production.

== Design ==
The Seaward Eagle is built predominantly of fiberglass. It has a fractional sloop rig, a plumb stem, a vertical transom, an internally mounted spade-type rudder controlled by a wheel and a fixed wing keel or optional lifting keel, powered by an electric winch. It displaces 7,700 lb (3,493 kg) and carries 3,000 lb (1,361 kg) of ballast with the wing keel and 2,500 lb (1,134 kg) of ballast with the lifting keel.

The wing keel-equipped version of the boat has a draft of 3.50 ft (1.07 m), while the lifting keel-equipped version has a draft of 6.5 ft (2.0 m) with the keel extended and 1.67 ft (0.51 m) with it retracted, allowing operation in shallow water.

The boat is fitted with an inboard engine for docking and maneuvering.

The design has sleeping accommodation for six people, with a double "V"-berth in the bow cabin, an U-shaped settee around a drop-down table in the main cabin and an aft cabin with a double berth on the port side. The galley is located on the starboard side just forward of the companionway ladder. The galley is U-shaped and is equipped with a two-burner stove, icebox and a double sink. The head is located just aft of the bow cabin on the port side.

The design has a hull speed of 7.41 kn (13.72 km/h).

== Reception ==
Noted naval architect Robert Perry reviewed the design in 2002, for Sailing Magazine, writing, "I thought this was a handsome boat with a perky, near-plumb stem, nice accenting rubrail and well-sculpted deck structures. What I don't like about his design is the way the sheer spring has been exaggerated aft. This is a great example of why you need to think of these lines in three dimensions. The sailplan shows this strong sheerline, and it looks just fine. But in the water, it appears to my eye that there is some conflict with the sheer's low point and the distribution of beam. The kick in the sheer aft is just too exaggerated for my eye. Still, it's good to see a designer with the chutzpa to put a healthy spring in the sheer. It certainly gives this boat a distinct personality, and nit-picking aside I like this boat."

A 2004 review in Sail magazine noted, "the accommodations, designed around the keel trunk in the saloon, are comfortable and well suited to coastal cruising."
