= Early Algebra =

Approach to teaching and learning algebra

Early Algebra is an approach to early mathematics teaching and learning. It is about teaching traditional topics in more profound ways. It is also an area of research in mathematics education.

Traditionally, algebra instruction has been postponed until adolescence. However, data of early algebra researchers shows ways to teach algebraic thinking much earlier. The National Council of Teachers of Mathematics (NCTM) integrates algebra into its Principles and Standards starting from Kindergarten.

One of the major goals of early algebra is generalizing number and set ideas. It moves from particular numbers to patterns in numbers. This includes generalizing arithmetic operations as functions, as well as engaging children in noticing and beginning to formalize properties of numbers and operations such as the commutative property, identities, and inverses.

Students historically have had a very difficult time adjusting to algebra for a number of reasons. Researchers have found that by working with students on such ideas as developing rules for the use of letters to stand in for numbers and the true meaning of the equals symbol (it is a balance point, and does not mean "put the answer next"), children are much better prepared for formal algebra instruction.

Teacher professional development in this area consists of presenting common student misconceptions and then developing lessons to move students out of faulty ways of thinking and into correct generalizations. The use of true, false, and open number sentences can go a long way toward getting students thinking about the properties of number and operations and the meaning of the equals sign.

Research areas in early algebra include use of representations, such as symbols, graphs and tables; cognitive development of students; viewing arithmetic as a part of algebraic conceptual fields
