= Represent (clothing brand) =

British clothing brand

Represent (stylized as REPRESENT) is a British streetwear brand founded in 2011 by fashion designers George and Michael Heaton in Horwich, Greater Manchester, England. The company reported revenues of £80.8 million in 2023 and was named the 68th fastest-growing company in the UK by The Sunday Times.

== History ==
George Heaton, while studying graphic design at the University of Salford, launched Represent in 2011 with his brother Michael. The brand initially produced screen-printed t-shirts before transitioning to in-house garment production in 2013.

Early visibility came through celebrity endorsements from Justin Bieber and British band Rizzle Kicks in 2012. By 2013, UK retailer Footasylum began stocking the brand, marking its entry into wholesale distribution.

Represent presented its first runway show at Paris Fashion Week in January 2017, followed by New York Fashion Week in February 2017. The company subsequently shifted production from the UK to Portugal between 2017-2018.

During the COVID-19 pandemic, Represent reduced wholesale operations to focus on direct-to-consumer sales through weekly online product releases. In 2020, the brand launched 247, a performance activewear line.

The company opened its first physical stores in 2024, including locations in West Hollywood, Manchester, and London.

== Business ==
Represent operates primarily through direct-to-consumer e-commerce and maintains wholesale partnerships with Selfridges, Harrods, and Harvey Nichols in the UK. Products are stocked in over 150 retailers worldwide.

In 2023, the company reported revenues of £80.8 million, up from £48.4 million in 2022. The brand's 247 activewear line accounted for approximately 9% of business in 2023.

George Heaton serves as creative director while Michael Heaton serves as creative director focusing on graphic design. Paul Spencer is CEO, Stefan Lewis as Chief Digital Officer, Matthew Shotton as Head of 247 and in 2024, the company appointed Kenny Wilson, former CEO of Dr. Martens, as chair.

== Collaborations ==
Represent has collaborated with rock bands including Mötley Crüe, Oasis, Metallica, and Ozzy Osbourne, as well as fashion brands including Belstaff and PUMA. The brand's 247 line has partnered with the likes of ultra-endurance athlete William Goodge, who completed record-breaking runs across America and Australia and more recently Russ cook ( aka The Hardest Geezer) who is known for running the entire length of Africa, New Zealand and across Iceland.
