= C-word =

C-word, or c word may refer to:

== Words ==
- Cunt, a vulgarism for female genitalia
- Cancer, an illness
- Cracker (term), a racial slur

== Works ==
- The C-Word, a posthumous 2015 book by Lisa Lynch (later dramatised)
- "The C Word", a 2006 Rollergirls episode
- "The C Word" (30 Rock), a 2007 30 Rock episode
- "The C-Word" (House), a 2012 House episode
- "The 'C' Word", a 1992 Herman's Head episode
- The C Word (film), a 2016 documentary

== See also ==
- Expurgation, replacing taboo words
- List of disability-related terms with negative connotations § C
- List of ethnic slurs § C
