= Seaward 22 =

1980s US recreational keelboat

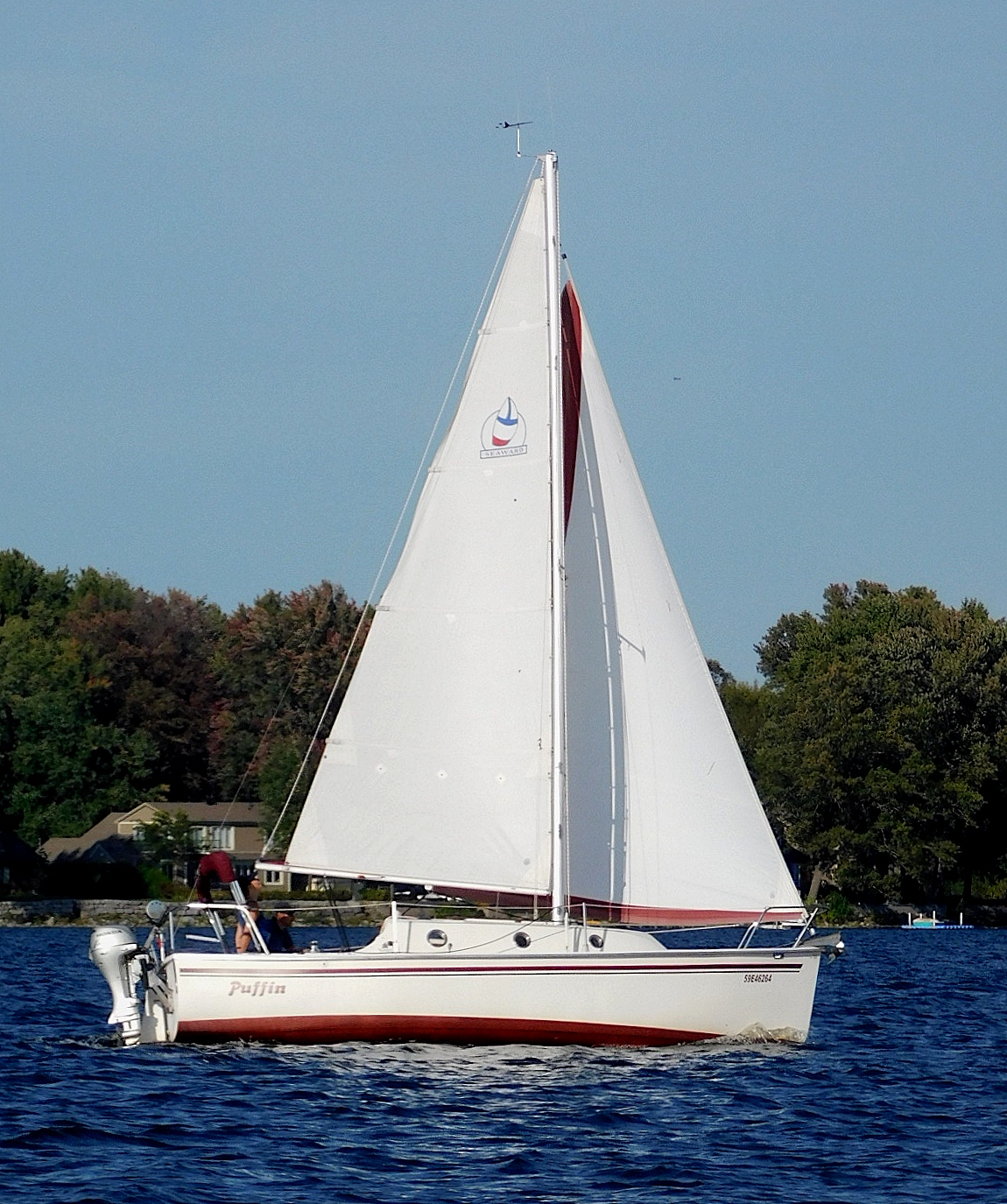

Development
- Designer: Nick Hake
- Location: United States
- Year: 1985
- Builder: Hake Yachts

Boat
- Displacement: 2,200 lb (998 kg)
- Draft: 3.42 ft (1.04 m) with centerboard down

Hull
- Type: Monohull
- Construction: Fiberglass
- LOA: 22.00 ft (6.71 m)
- LWL: 20.58 ft (6.27 m)
- Beam: 8.33 ft (2.54 m)
- Engine: Outboard motor

Hull appendages
- Keel: fin keel with centerboard
- Ballast: 750 lb (340 kg)
- Rudder: transom-mounted rudder

Rig
- Rig type: Bermuda rig
- I foretriangle height: 23.00 ft (7.01 m)
- J foretriangle base: 8.00 ft (2.44 m)
- P mainsail luff: 22.50 ft (6.86 m)
- E mainsail foot: 9.00 ft (2.74 m)

Sails
- Sailplan: Fractional rigged sloop
- Mainsail area: 101.25 sq ft (9.406 m^{2})
- Jib/genoa area: 92.00 sq ft (8.547 m^{2})
- Total sail area: 193.25 sq ft (17.954 m^{2})

Rating
- PHRF: 285

The Seaward 22 is a recreational keelboat. It was built by Hake Yachts of Stuart, Florida starting in 1985. The company later re-located to Largo, Florida, United States and was renamed the Starboard Yacht Company, when they bought out Island Packet Yachts. The Seaward 22 is now out of production.

== Design ==
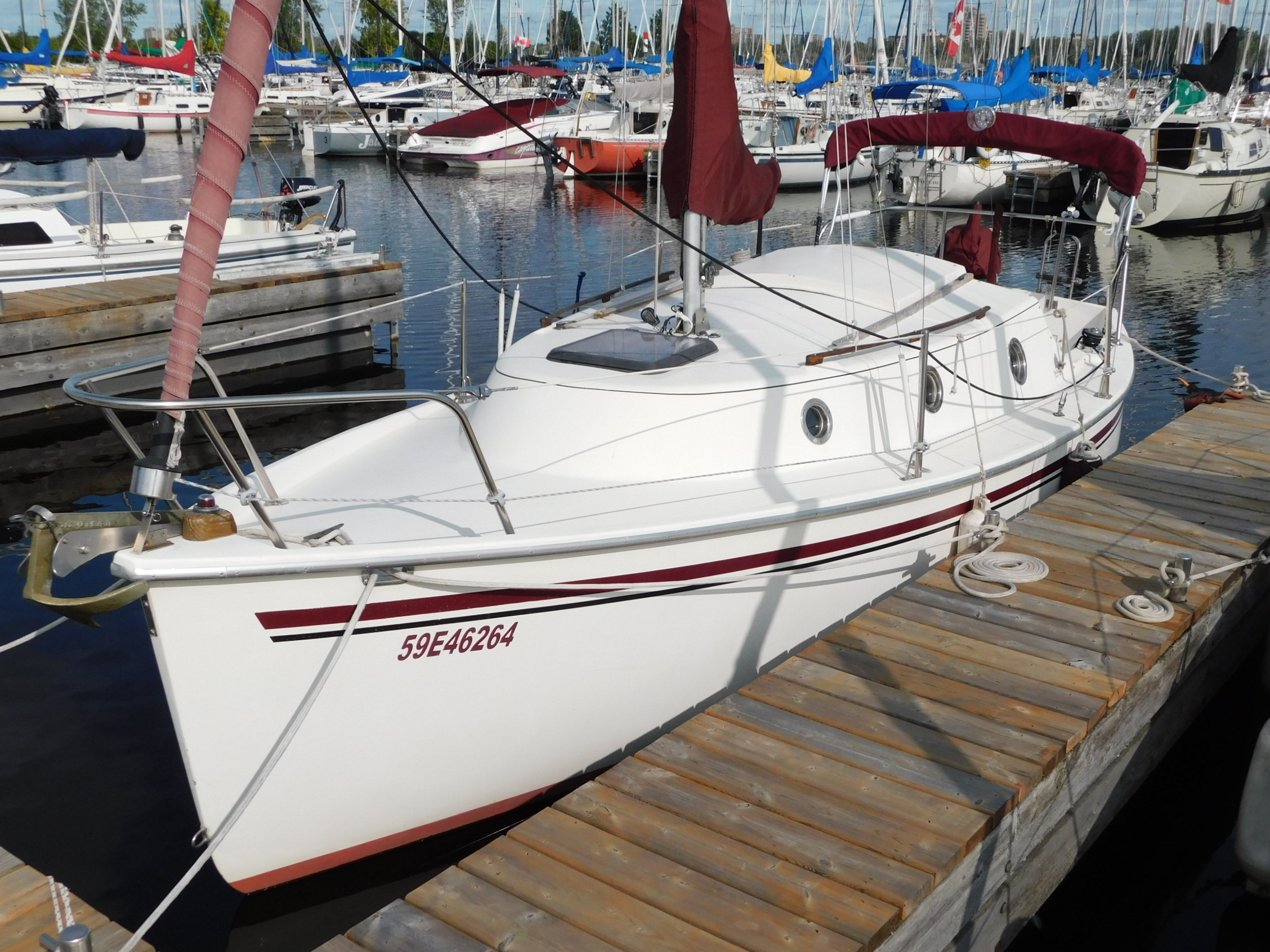
Seaward 22

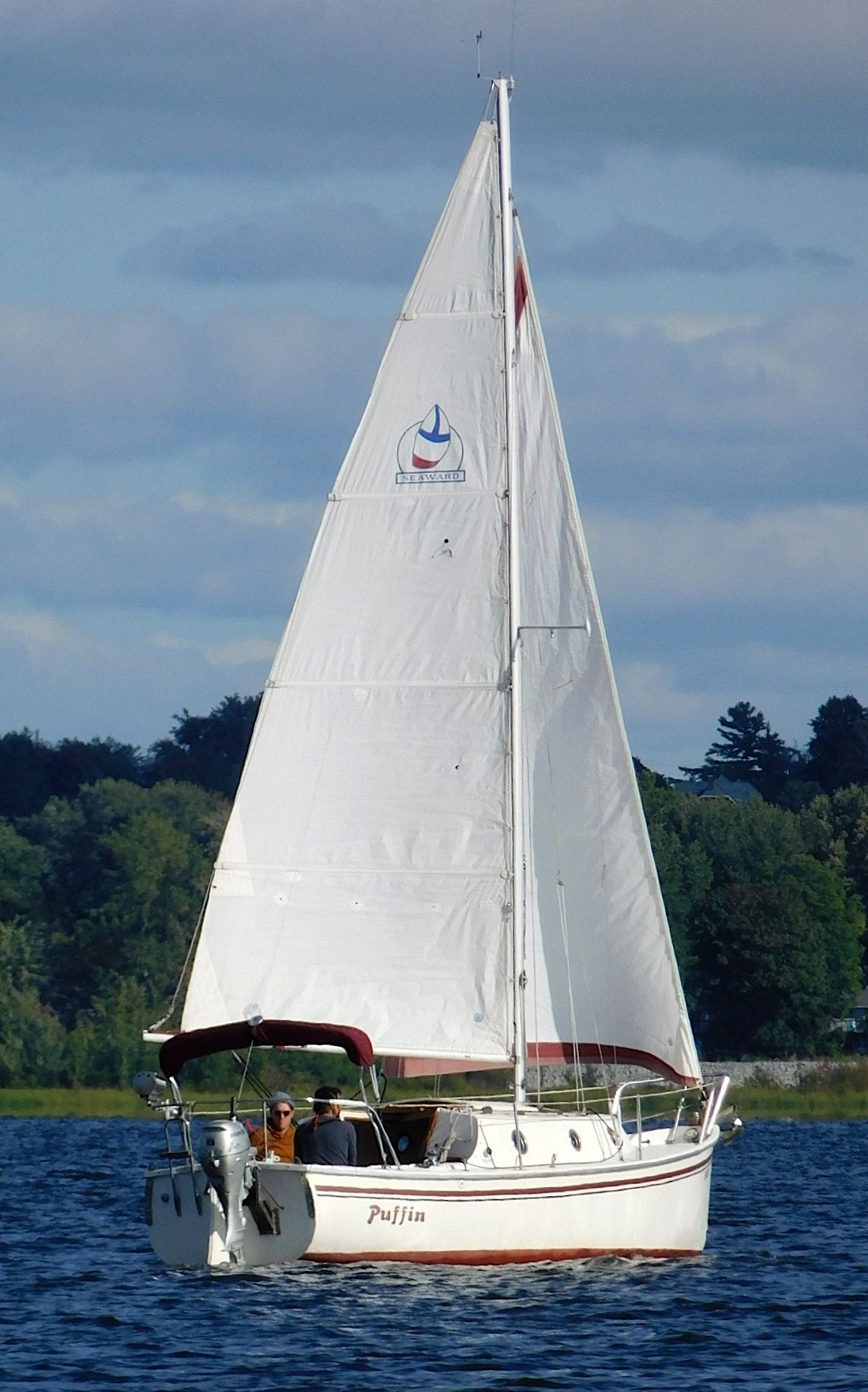
Seaward 22, showing the transom and outboard motor

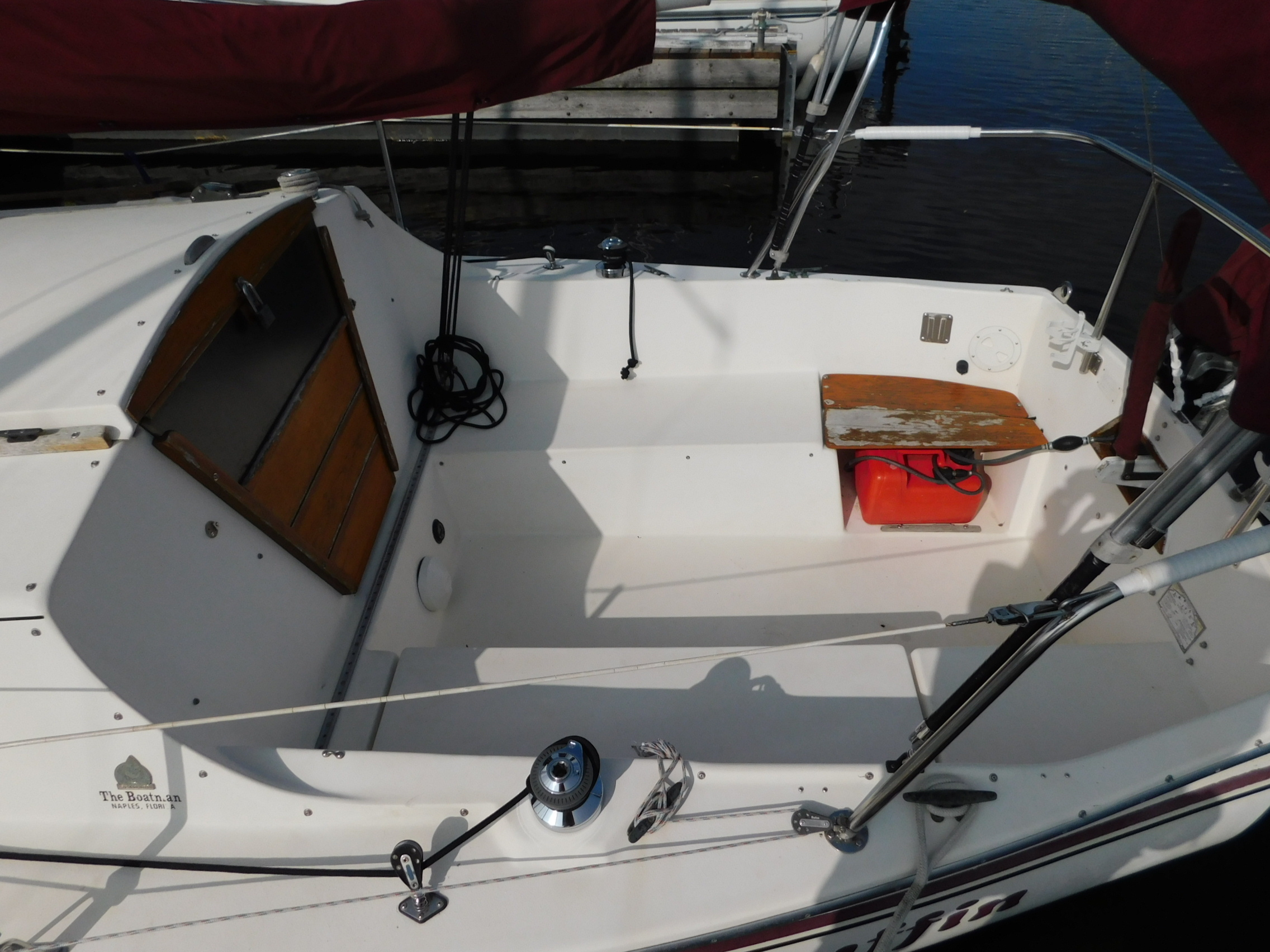
Seaward 22 cockpit

The Seaward 22 is a recreational keelboat, built predominantly of fiberglass, with wood trim.

The boat has a fractional sloop rig, a plumb stem, a vertical transom, a transom-hung rudder controlled by a tiller and a fixed stub keel with a centerboard. It has six round portholes in the coach house.

The design displaces 2,200 lb (998 kg) and carries 750 lb (340 kg) of ballast.

The boat has a draft of 3.42 ft (1.04 m) with the centerboard extended and 1.92 ft (0.59 m) with it retracted, allowing operation in shallow water and ground transportation on a trailer.

The boat is normally fitted with a small 3 to 6 hp (2 to 4 kW) outboard motor for docking and maneuvering.

The design has sleeping accommodation for four people, with a double "V"-berth in the bow cabin and two straight settee berths in the main cabin. The galley is located on the starboard side and includes a pull-out two-burner stove under the starboard bunk and a sink above the bunk. The head is located under the bow cabin "V"-berth. Cabin headroom is 54 in (137 cm).

The design has a PHRF racing average handicap of 285 and a hull speed of 6.1 kn (11.3 km/h).

== Reception ==
The design was included in Cruising World's 1989 Year's Newest Cruising Boats. The accompanying review said, "the design premise behind the latest offering from Florida's Starboard Yacht Company was to make maximum use of space on a small yacht of minimal length, in this case 22 feet. The result is the neat little Seaward 22. A plumb stem to stretch the waterline and a healthy beam of 8'4" ensured a hull of generous lines and internal volume that designer Nicholas Hake used to full advantage. A private forward cabin with full sitting headroom contains a 7'4" V-berth (enclosing the head). The main cabin houses two 6'6" berths and nifty galley arrangement ... the Seaward 22's middle name might well be "versatile." It's a boat that will feel right at home in waters deep or shallow whether just down the street or on the other side of the country."

In a 2010 review Steve Henkel wrote, "The Seaward 22 ... has round ports while the 23 has better-looking rectangular ports, and there are many other differences as well ... Best features: To the builder's credit, the hardware is generally top quality and the finishing touches carefully applied. The icebox is accessible from both the cockpit and the cabin, a great convenience on a hot day when the helmsman wants to reach for a cool one without bothering the crew below Worst features: Although her performance parameters are mostly similar to her comp[etitor]s, she appears to suffer badly in the speed department compared to the Columbia 22 which has a PHRF rating a full 99 seconds lower, despite the fact that the Columbia is several hundred pounds heavier ..."
