= Seaward 24 =

1980s US recreational keelboat

Development
- Designer: Nick Hake
- Location: United States
- Year: 1984
- Builder: Hake Yachts
- Role: Cruiser

Boat
- Displacement: 3,100 lb (1,406 kg)
- Draft: 3.50 ft (1.07 m) with centerboard down

Hull
- Type: monohull
- Construction: fiberglass
- LOA: 24.33 ft (7.42 m)
- LWL: 22.16 ft (6.75 m)
- Beam: 8.25 ft (2.51 m)
- Engine: outboard motor

Hull appendages
- Keel: stub keel and centerboard
- Ballast: 1,100 lb (499 kg)
- Rudder: transom-mounted rudder

Rig
- Rig type: Bermuda rig

Sails
- Sailplan: fractional rigged sloop
- Total sail area: 265.00 sq ft (24.619 m^{2})

Racing
- PHRF: 261

The Seaward 24 is a recreational keelboat built by Hake Yachts in the United States, starting in 1984, but it is now out of production.

== Design ==
The Seaward 24 is built predominantly of fiberglass, with wood trim. It has a fractional sloop rig, a plumb stem, a slightly angled transom, a transom-hung rudder controlled by a tiller and a fixed stub keel with a retractable centerboard. It displaces 3,100 lb (1,406 kg) and carries 1,100 lb (499 kg) of lead ballast.

The boat has a draft of 3.50 ft (1.07 m) with the centerboard extended and 2.00 ft (0.61 m) with it retracted, allowing operation in shallow water or ground transportation on a trailer.

The boat is normally fitted with a small 3 to 6 hp (2 to 4 kW) outboard motor for docking and maneuvering.

The design has sleeping accommodation for five people, with a double "V"-berth in the bow cabin, a straight settee berth in the main cabin plus a convertible double berth on the port side. The galley is located on the port side just forward of the companionway ladder. The galley is equipped with a two-burner stove, an icebox and a sink, with a refrigerator optional. The head is located just aft of the bow cabin on the starboard side. Cabin headroom is 60 in (152 cm).

For sailing the design may be equipped with a jib, storm jib or 150% genoa.

The design has a PHRF racing average handicap of 261 and a hull speed of 6.3 kn (11.7 km/h).

== Reception ==
In a 2010 review Steve Henkel wrote, "... the accommodations plan of the Seaward 24 shows both a gimballed stove with oven and space for a refrigerator (though ... a refrigerator is somewhat impractical on an outboard powered sailboat because of the electrical drain on the batteries, which would require many hours of charging with the noise and smell of a running engine). Best features: Her relatively low freeboard and springy sheer give the Seaward 24 a sleek and salty look, as if she is ready for whatever challenges the sea might bring to her. She is well-built to boot, and with her generous sailplan and long waterline for her size has a better than even chance of satisfying the requirements of experienced sailors. Worst features: None noted."
