= Seaward Fox =

1990s US trailer sailer

Development
- Designer: Nick Hake
- Location: United States
- Year: 1993
- Builder: Hake Yachts
- Role: Cruiser
- Name: Seaward Fox

Boat
- Displacement: 1,350 lb (612 kg)
- Draft: 1.58 ft (0.48 m)

Hull
- Type: monohull
- Construction: fiberglass
- LOA: 19.75 ft (6.02 m)
- LWL: 14.83 ft (4.52 m)
- Beam: 8.00 ft (2.44 m)
- Engine: outboard motor

Hull appendages
- Keel: wing keel
- Ballast: 450 lb (204 kg)
- Rudder: transom-mounted rudder

Rig
- Rig type: Bermuda rig

Sails
- Sailplan: fractional rigged sloop
- Total sail area: 170.00 sq ft (15.794 m^{2})

The Seaward Fox is a trailer sailer designed by Nick Hake and first built in 1993. The Fox is a development of the 1981 Slipper 17. It was built by Hake Yachts in the United States, from 1993 until 2007, but it is now out of production.

== Design ==
The Seaward Fox is built predominantly of fiberglass, with wood trim. It has a fractional sloop rig or unstayed catboat rig with a tall mast, an optional bowsprit, a nearly plumb stem, a slightly angled transom, a transom-hung rudder controlled by a tiller and a fixed shoal-draft wing keel. It displaces 1,350 lb (612 kg) and carries 450 lb (204 kg) of ballast.

The boat has a draft of 1.58 ft (0.48 m) with the standard keel.

The boat is normally fitted with a small 3 to 6 hp (2 to 4 kW) outboard motor for docking and maneuvering.

The design has sleeping accommodation for four people, with a double "V"-berth in the bow cabin and two straight settee berths in the main cabin. The galley is located on both sides just aft of the bow cabin. The galley is equipped with a stove to port and a sink to starboard. The head is located in the bow cabin, centered aft, under the "V"-berth. Cabin headroom is 51 in (130 cm).

The design has a hull speed of 5.4 kn (10.0 km/h).

== Reception ==
In a 2010 review Steve Henkel wrote, "designer Hake has taken the same basic beamy hull that he created in 1979 with the Slipper Deckhouse 17 ... spruced her up with fancier oval ports and other gear, increased some of her dimensions slightly. and changed her name. For a while she was available with either a sloop rig or a very tall cat rig (bridge clearance 33' for the cat, 8' less for the sloop) ... Best features: We think she's relatively good-looking, with springy sheer, pronounced tumblehome, molded bulwarks, and nice fittings such as shiny stainless opening oval ports and cowl vent on the cabintop. Her self-bailing cockpit is deep and comfortable for two people, and her interior is relatively spacious considering her modest LOD; her Space Index is highest of her comp[etitor]s. The rotating freestanding carbon-fiber mast is 28' 6" long, weighs only 33 pounds, and is secured by a two-footlong sliding aluminum tube inside the mast, which couples the upper mast to a rotating mast bearing on the deck, It is claimed that the vessel takes less than five minutes to rig at a boat ramp, Worst features: Her shallow fixed keel, despite the small wings, prevents pointing as high as her comp[etitor]s, especially in light air."
