= Soward =

Soward is a surname of English origin. Notable people with the surname include:

- George Klewitz Soward (1857–1941), Australian architect and politician
- Jamie Soward (born 1984), Australian rugby league player
- R. Jay Soward (born 1978), American football player

== See also ==
- Sowards
