= Embodied writing =

Embodied writing is a practice used by academics and writers aimed at making a creative process from the body as opposed to the mind. The process mainly focuses on using experiences within the body and using the body's sense in the creative process.

== Definition ==
Embodied writing is a loose term that generally means to create art from not just from the mind but the body's experiences also. The approach is usually more fluid and involves unconventional writing or research styles.

== Usage ==
In creative writing, embodied writing can help shape stories based off intuition and meaning, rather than starting with analyzing the writing first. Writers are able to channel their imagination through daydreams and sensory and instinctual experiences to write more emotionally impactful stories.

In dance theory, embodied choreographic writing is using the mind together with consciousness and lived experiences when dancing. This method also works as a way for dancers to experience "being-in-the-world".

In yoga, embodied writing helps to engage the body through bodily hermeneutics to more deeply connect the body. This also helps yogis with understading the practice of yoga itself practice mindfully.
