= The Representative (newspaper) =

London newspaper

- Founder: John Murray II
- Editor: Benjamin Disraeli
- Founded: 25 January 1826
- Ceased publication: 29 July 1826

The Representative was a daily newspaper published in London, England. Established on 25 January 1826, it ceased to exist on 29 July 1826.

In autumn of 1825 the young Benjamin Disraeli convinced his father's friend, the publisher John Murray, that the time was ripe for a Canningite morning paper that would challenge The Times. Murray agreed to supply half of the capital, with Disraeli and John Diston Powles, a City speculator, each contributing one-quarter. Disraeli travelled to Chiefswood (near Melrose) to persuade John Gibson Lockhart (Sir Walter Scott's son-in-law) to edit the paper; Lockhart declined, but agreed to serve as editor of Murray's Quarterly Review and consult on the management of the paper. Disraeli returned to London and began preparations. Lockhart's suggestion that William Maginn be employed was accepted, and he was sent to Paris as foreign correspondent, where he "drank much and wrote little." Offices were leased in the fashionable West End on Great George Street, distant from both Fleet Street and Grub Street.

The Representative was launched on 25 January 1826 and apparently never had a proper editor – Disraeli quarrelled with Murray and later satirised him in a novel, Vivian Grey, as the "Marquess of Carabas." The "Rep's" politics were incoherent and advertising began slipping away almost immediately. Soon its nickname was the "demi-Rep." Maginn was brought back from Paris in March to try to salvage the paper, but it expired with much finger-pointing in the summer of 1826, and was merged with the New Times. Murray lost heavily (about £26,000) and never attempted another foray into newspaper publishing. Disraeli went on to a career in politics, eventually becoming Prime Minister.
