= Representation =

Representation may refer to:

== Law and politics ==
- Representation (politics), political activities undertaken by elected representatives, as well as other theories
  - Representative democracy, type of democracy in which elected officials represent a group of people
- Representation in contract law, a pre-contractual statement that may (if untrue) result in liability for misrepresentation
- Labor representation, or worker representation, the work of a union representative who represents and defends the interests of fellow labor union members
- Legal representation, provided by a barrister, lawyer, or other advocate
- Lobbying or interest representation, attempts to influence the actions, policies, or decisions of officials
- "No taxation without representation", a 1700s slogan that summarized one of the American colonists' 27 colonial grievances in the Thirteen Colonies, which was one of the major causes of the American Revolution
- Permanent representation, a type of diplomatic mission

== Arts, entertainment, and media ==
- Representation (arts), use of signs that stand in for and take the place of something else
- Representation (journal), an academic journal covering representative democracy
- Depiction, non-verbal representation through two-dimensional images (pictures) of things seen, remembered or imagined

== Cognitive science and philosophy ==
- Representation (psychology) (also "mental representation" or "cognitive representation"), a hypothetical 'internal' cognitive symbol that represents external reality
- Knowledge representation, the study of formal ways to describe knowledge
- Representation theory (linguistics), a theoretical framework in generative linguistics

== Mathematics ==
- Representation (mathematics), a very general relationship that expresses similarities between objects
  - Group representation, describes abstract groups in terms of linear transformations of vector spaces
  - Representation of a Lie group, a linear action of a Lie group on a vector space
  - Lie algebra representation, a way of writing a Lie algebra as a set of matrices in such a way that the Lie bracket is given by the commutator
- Multiple representations (mathematics education), ways to symbolize, to describe and to refer to the same mathematical entity

== Other uses ==
- Representation (chemistry), graphic representation of the molecular structure of a chemical compound
- Social representation, a stock of values, ideas, beliefs, and practices that are shared among the members of groups and communities
- Representative sample in statistics

== See also ==
- Data visualization, the creation and study of the visual representation of data
- Reprazent, a British drum and bass group
- Represent (disambiguation)
