= Multiple representations (mathematics education) =

Method

In mathematics education, a representation is a way of encoding an idea or a relationship, and can be both internal (e.g., mental construct) and external (e.g., graph). Thus multiple representations are ways to symbolize, to describe and to refer to the same mathematical entity. They are used to understand, to develop, and to communicate different mathematical features of the same object or operation, as well as connections between different properties. Multiple representations include graphs and diagrams, tables and grids, formulas, symbols, words, gestures, software code, videos, concrete models, physical and virtual manipulatives, pictures, and sounds. Representations are thinking tools for doing mathematics.

== Higher-order thinking ==
The use of multiple representations supports and requires tasks that involve decision-making and other problem-solving skills. The choice of which representation to use, the task of making representations given other representations, and the understanding of how changes in one representation affect others are examples of such mathematically sophisticated activities. Estimation, another complex task, can strongly benefit from multiple representations

Curricula that support starting from conceptual understanding, then developing procedural fluency, for example, AIMS Foundation Activities, frequently use multiple representations.

Supporting student use of multiple representations may lead to more open-ended problems, or at least accepting multiple methods of solutions and forms of answers. Project-based learning units, such as WebQuests, typically call for several representations.

== Motivation ==
Some representations, such as pictures, videos and manipulatives, can motivate because of their richness, possibilities of play, use of technologies, or connections with interesting areas of life. Tasks that involve multiple representations can sustain intrinsic motivation in mathematics, by supporting higher-order thinking and problem solving.

Multiple representations may also remove some of the gender biases that exist in math classrooms. For example, explaining probability solely through baseball statistics may potentially alienate students who have no interest in sports. When showing a tie to real-life applications, teachers should choose representations that are varied and of interest to all genders and cultures.

== Assessment ==
Tasks that involve construction, use, and interpretation of multiple representations can lend themselves to rubric assessment, and other assessment types suitable for open-ended activities. For example, tapping into visualization for math problem solving manifests multiple representations. These multiple representations arise when each student uses their knowledge base and experience—to create a visualization of the problem domain on the way toward a solution. Since visualization can be categorized into two main areas, schematic or pictorial, most students will make use of one method, or sometimes both methods to represent the problem domain.

Comparison of the different visualization tools created by each student is an excellent example of multiple representations. Further, the instructor may glean from these examples elements which they incorporate into their grading rubric. In this way, it is the students that provide the examples and standards against which scoring is done. This crucial factor places each student on equal footing and links them directly with their performance in class.

== Special education and differentiated instruction ==
Students with special needs may be weaker in their use of some of the representations. For these students, it may be especially important to use multiple representations for two purposes. First, including representations that currently work well for the student ensures the understanding of the current mathematical topic. Second, connections among multiple representations within the same topic strengthens overall skills in using all representations, even those currently problematic.

It is also helpful to ESL/ELL (English as a Second Language/English Language Learners) to use multiple representations. The more one can bring a concept to "life" in a visual way, the more likely the students will grasp what the teacher is talking about. This is also important with younger students, who may have not had a lot of experience or prior knowledge on the topics that are being taught.

Using multiple representations can help differentiate instruction by addressing different learning styles,.

== Qualitative and quantitative reasoning ==
Visual representations, manipulatives, gestures, and to some degree grids, can support qualitative reasoning about mathematics. Instead of only emphasizing computational skills, multiple representations can help students make the conceptual shift to the meaning and use of, and to develop algebraic thinking. By focusing more on the conceptual representations of algebraic problems, students have a better chance of improving their problem solving skills.

== NCTM representations standard ==
National Council of Teachers of Mathematics has a standard dealing with multiple representations. In part, it reads "Instructional programs should enable all students to do the following:

- Create and use representations to organize, record, and communicate mathematical ideas
- Select, apply, and translate among mathematical representations to solve problems
- Use representations to model and interpret physical, social, and mathematical phenomena"

== Four most frequent school mathematics representations ==
While there are many representations used in mathematics, the secondary curricula heavily favor numbers (often in tables), formulas, graphs and words.

== Systems of manipulatives ==
Several curricula use extensively developed systems of manipulatives and the corresponding representations. For example, Cuisinaire rods, Montessori beads, Algebra Tiles, Base-10 blocks, counters.

== Use of technology ==
Use of computer tools to create and to share mathematical representations opens several possibilities. It allows to link multiple representations dynamically. For example, changing a formula can instantly change the graph, the table of values, and the text read-out for the function represented in all these ways. Technology use can increase accuracy and speed of data collection and allow real-time visualization and experimentation. It also supports collaboration.

Computer tools may be intrinsically interesting and motivating to students, and provide a familiar and comforting context students already use in their daily life.

Spreadsheet software such as Excel, LibreOffice Calc, Google Sheets, is widely used in many industries, and showing students the use of applications can make math more realistic. Most spreadsheet programs provide dynamic links among formulas, grids and several types of graphs.

Carnegie Learning curriculum is an example of emphasis on multiple representations and use of computer tools. More specifically, Carnegie learning focuses the student not only on solving the real life scenarios presented in the text, but also promotes literacy through sentence writing and explanations of student thinking. In conjunction with the scenario based text Carnegie Learning provides a web based tutoring program called the "Cognitive Tutor" which uses data collected from each question a student answers to direct the student to areas where they need more help.

GeoGebra is free software dynamically linking geometric constructions, graphs, formulas, and grids. It can be used in a browser and is light enough for older or low-end computers.

Project Interactivate has many activities linking visual, verbal and numeric representations. There are currently 159 different activities available, in many areas of math, including numbers and operations, probability, geometry, algebra, statistics and modeling.

Another helpful tool for mathematicians, scientists, engineers is LaTeX. It is a typesetting program that allows one to create tables, figures, graphs etc., and to provide one with a precise visual of the problem being worked on.

== Concerns ==
There are concerns that technology for working with multiple representations can become an end in itself, thereby distracting the students from the actual mathematical content.

Additionally, it is also objected that care should be taken, so that informal representations do not prevent students from progressing toward formal, symbolic mathematics.

== See also ==
- Heuristic
