= Island Packet Yachts =

Sailboat manufacturer

Island Packet Yachts is an American builder of blue-water cruising sailing and motor yachts, based out of Largo, Florida. The incorporated name for the company is Traditional Watercraft, Inc. Production facilities are located on five acres of ground with 52,000 square feet (4,800 m^{2}) of covered manufacturing space in central Pinellas County.

Island Packet Yachts is a subsidiary of Traditional Watercraft, Inc., founded by naval architect Bob Johnson in 1979. In January 2017, Darrell and Leslie Allen took ownership of the company, and it became Island Packet and Seaward Yachts. The Allens have a long history with Island Packet as the dealer in San Diego, CA, for over 25 years. The Allens started with just 13 employees, and today they are over 50, with many returning craftsmen who have over 20 years of experience building Island Packet Yachts. Island Packet Yachts 349 model, introduced in 2018, was named Cruising World's 2019 Domestic Boat of the Year, and the 439 model won Cruising World's 2021 Best Full-Size Cruiser of the Year.

== History ==
Island Packet models have won several industry awards over the years, including seven Cruising World magazine "Boat of the Year" awards and three SAIL magazine "Best Boats" awards. Most recently, Island Packet Yachts won Cruising World Magazine's "Domestic Boat of the Year" Award in 2019 for the IP349, and in 2021, they won Cruising World Magazine's "Best Full-Size Cruiser of the Year" Award for the IP439. Original owner and Naval Architect Bob Johnson is also the recipient of the 1999 "Industry Award for Leadership" presented by SAIL magazine.

In mid-April 2016, Traditional Watercraft was acquired by Hake Yachts, which combined operations to build Island Packet, Blue Jacket, and Seaward yachts in its Largo, Florida, facilities.

In January 2017, Darrell and Leslie Allen took ownership of the company, focusing on reinvigorating the Island Packet brand by introducing a new model (IP349) and allowing for new owners to specify certain aspects of both interior and rig configuration.

== Models ==
- Sailboats (chronological order of introduction)
  - Island Packet (26 Mark I) -1980
  - Island Packet 26 (Mark II) -1982
  - Island Packet 31 -1983 - 1989
  - Island Packet 27 -1984 - 1992
  - Island Packet 38 -1986 - 1995
  - Island Packet 35 - 1988 - 1994
  - Island Packet 32 -1989 - 1995
  - Island Packet 29 -1981 - 1997
  - Island Packet 44 -1991 - 1995
  - Packet Cat (35) -1992
  - Island Packet 40 -1993 - 1995
  - Island Packet 37 -1994 - 1995
  - Island Packet 45 -1995 - 1995
  - Island Packet 350 -1996–present
  - Island Packet 320 -1997–present
  - Island Packet 380 -1998–present
  - Island Packet 420 -1999–present
  - Island Packet 485 -2002–present
  - Island Packet 370 -2003–present
  - Island Packet 445 -2004–present
  - Island Packet 440 -2005–present
  - SP Cruiser -2006–present
  - Island Packet 465 -2007–present
  - Island Packet 460 -2008–present
  - Island Packet Estero -2009–present
  - Island Packet 360 -2011–present
  - Island Packet 349 - 2018–Present
  - Island Packet 439 - 2021–Present
- Powerboats
  - Packet Craft (36) -2001–present
  - PY Cruiser -2006–present

== See also ==
- List of sailboat designers and manufacturers

== Bibliography ==
- Sail Magazine July 2006 Pgs 64 - 67
- Heart of GLASS, Fiberglass Boats And The Men Who Made Them by Daniel Spurr pages 244 - 250
- PHRF of Southern California
- "Full Keels and High Tech", Sailing Magazine, September 1992, John Kretschmer
- The Island Packet 31", Practical Sailor, September 1991, pages 28–32
- "Bob Johnson: a love affair with boat design", Florida Business/Tampa Bay, June 1987
