= Earl of Rochester =

Title in the Peerage of England

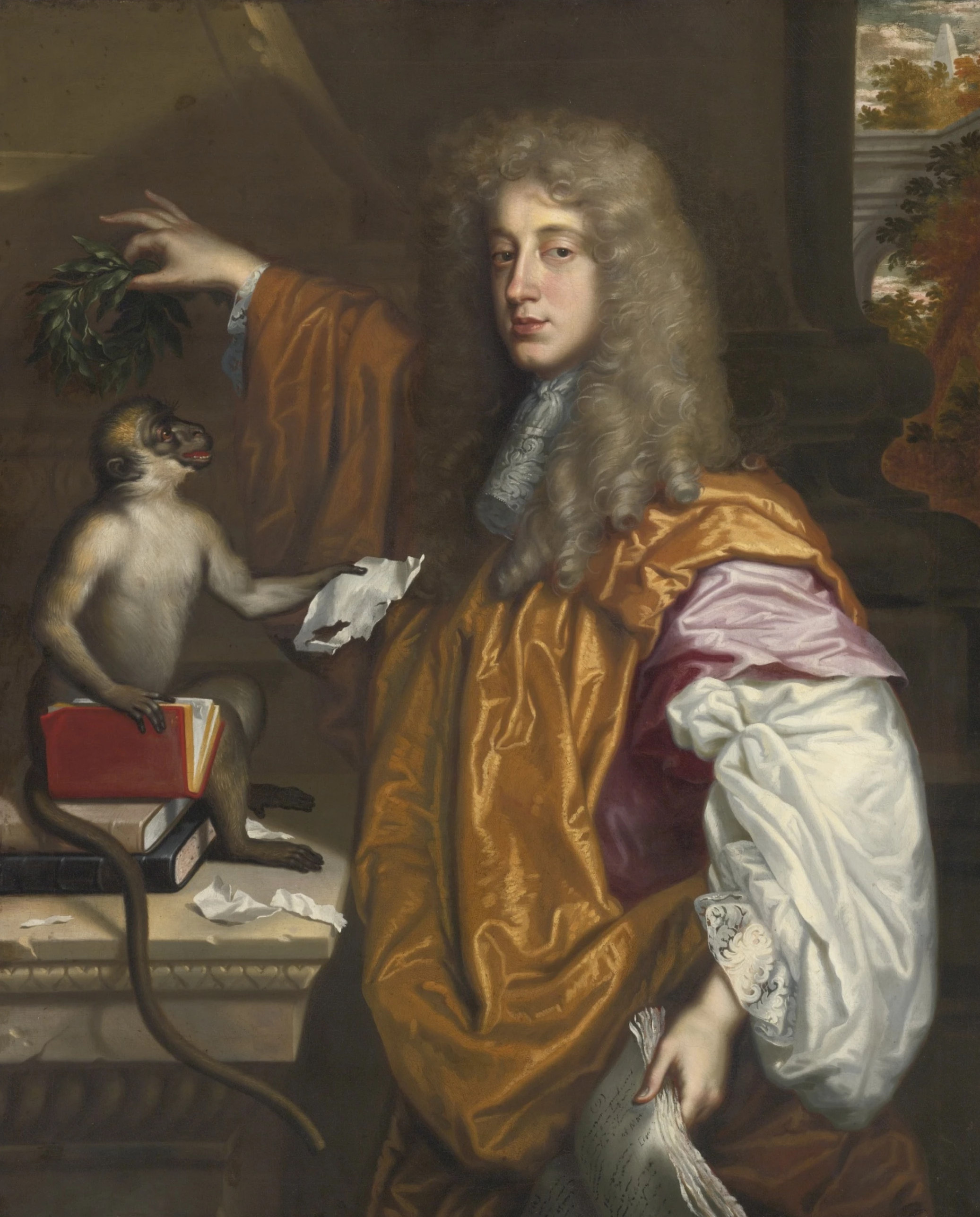
John Wilmot, 2nd Earl of Rochester

Earl of Rochester was a title that was created twice in the Peerage of England. The first creation came in 1652 in favour of the Royalist soldier Henry Wilmot, 2nd Viscount Wilmot. He had already been created Baron Wilmot, of Adderbury in the County of Oxford, in 1643, also in the Peerage of England. He was the son of Charles Wilmot, who had been elevated to the Peerage of Ireland as Viscount Wilmot, of Athlone, in 1622. Lord Rochester died in 1658 and was succeeded by his son John Wilmot, 2nd Earl of Rochester. He was a poet, a friend of King Charles II, and the writer of satirical and bawdy poetry. He married the heiress Elizabeth Malet. He was succeeded on his death in 1680 by his only son, the third Earl. He, in turn, died at a young age the following year, when the titles became extinct.

The second creation came in 1682 in favour of the statesman and writer the Honourable Laurence Hyde. He was made Baron Wotton Basset and Viscount Hyde, of Kenilworth in the County of Warwick, at the same time, also in the Peerage of England. Hyde was the second son of Edward Hyde, 1st Earl of Clarendon. He was succeeded by his only son Henry, the second Earl. He notably served as Lord-Lieutenant of Cornwall. In 1723 he succeeded his cousin as fourth Earl of Clarendon. His only surviving son Henry Hyde, Viscount Cornbury, was summoned to the House of Lords through a writ of acceleration in his father's junior title of Baron Hyde in 1750. However, he died in May 1753, predeceasing his father by seven months. On Lord Clarendon and Rochester's death in December of the same year all the titles became extinct.

== Viscounts Wilmot (1621) ==
- Charles Wilmot, 1st Viscount Wilmot (1571–1644)
- Henry Wilmot, 2nd Viscount Wilmot (1612–1658) (created Baron Wilmot in 1643 and Earl of Rochester in 1652)

== Earls of Rochester; First creation (1652) ==
- Henry Wilmot, 1st Earl of Rochester (1612–1658)
- John Wilmot, 2nd Earl of Rochester (1647–1680)
- Charles Wilmot, 3rd Earl of Rochester (1671–1681)

== Earls of Rochester; Second creation (1682) ==
- Laurence Hyde, 1st Earl of Rochester (1642–1711)
- Henry Hyde, 4th Earl of Clarendon, 2nd Earl of Rochester (1672–1753)
  - Hon. Edward Hyde (d. 1702)
  - Hon. Laurence Hyde (1703–1704)
  - Henry Hyde, Viscount Cornbury, 5th Baron Hyde (1710–1753)

Villiers family tree including the Dukes of Buckingham (2nd creation), Earls of Jersey, and Earls of Clarendon

John St John by 1495–1558
Nicholas St. John by 1526–1589
Viscount Grandison of Limerick, 1620; Baron Tregoz, 1626	Earl (Countess) of Buckingham (5th creation), 1618
John St. John c. 1552–1594	Oliver St. John c. 1560–1630; 1st Viscount Grandison, etc.	George Villiers (of Brokesby) c. 1544–1606	Mary (Beaumont) Villiers c. 1570–1632; Countess of Buckingham
Barony Tregoz extinct, 1630	Earldom for life only, extinct 1632
Villiers baronets, 1619	Viscount Purbeck and Baron Villiers of Stoke, 1619	Viscount Villiers and Baron Whaddon, 1616; Earl of Buckingham (4th creation), 1617; Marquess of Buckingham (1st creation), 1618; Duke of Buckingham (2nd creation) and Earl of Coventry (1st creation), 1623	Earl of Anglesey (1st creation) and Baron Villiers, 1623
William Villiers c. 1575–1629; 1st Baronet	Barbara St John	Edward Villiers c. 1585–1626	John Villiers c. 1591–1658; Viscount Purbeck, etc.	George Villiers; 1592–1628; 1st Duke of Buckingham, etc.	Christopher Villiers c. 1593–1630; 1st Earl of Anglesey, etc.
Viscountcy of Purbeck extinct, 1658
Baron Hyde of Hindon (1st creation), 1660; Earl of Clarendon (1st creation) and Viscount Cornbury, 1661
George Villiers; 1620–1682; 2nd Baronet	William Villiers; 1614–1643; 2nd Viscount Grandison	John Villiers c. 1616–1659; 3rd Viscount Grandison	George Villiers; 1618–1699; 4th Viscount Grandison	Edward Villiers; 1620–1689	George Villiers; 1628–1687; 2nd Duke of Buckingham, etc.	Christopher Villiers d. 1661; 2nd Earl of Anglesey, etc.	Edward Hyde; 1609–1674; 1st Earl of Clarendon, etc.
Dukedom of Buckingham (2nd creation) and subsidiary titles extinct, 1687	Earldom of Anglesey (1st creation) and subsidiary title extinct extinct, 1661
Earl of Rochester 2nd creation, Viscount Hyde, and Baron Wotton Basset, 1682
George Villiers; 1645–1712; 3rd Baronet	Barbara (Villiers) Palmer; 1640–1709; Duchess of Cleveland, Countess of Castlemaine, Baroness Nonsuch	King Charles II; 1630–1685	King James II; 1633–1701	Anne Hyde; 1637–1671	Henry Hyde; 1638–1709; 2nd Earl of Clarendon, etc.	Laurence Hyde; 1642–1711; 1st Earl of Rochester, etc.
Villiars Baronets extinct, 1712	Viscount Villiers, 1691; Earl of Jersey, 1697
Edward FitzGerald-Villiers c. 1654–1693	Edward Villiers c. 1656–1711; 1st Earl of Jersey, etc.	Queen Mary II; 1662–1694	Queen Anne; 1665–1714	Edward Hyde; 1661–1723; 3rd Earl of Clarendon, etc.	Henry Hyde; 1672–1753; 4th Earl of Clarendon, etc., 2nd Earl of Rochester, etc.
Earldom of Clarendon (1st creation) and subsidiary titles extinct, 1753
Earl Grandison (1st creation), 1721
John Villiers c. 1684–1766; Earl Grandison, 5th Viscount Grandison	Harriet Villiers; 1680–1736	William Villiers c. 1682–1721; 2nd Earl of Jersey, etc.	Jane Capell; 1694–1724; Countess of Essex
Earldom of Grandison (1st creation) extinct, 1766
Viscount Grandison (2nd creation), 1746; Earl Grandison (2nd creation), 1767	Baron Hyde (2nd creation), 1756; Earl of Clarendon (2nd creation), 1776
James FitzGerald-Villiers; 1708–1732 styled Lord Villiers	Elizabeth Villiers d. 1782; 1st Countess Grandison, etc.	William Pitt "the Elder"; 1708–1778; Earl of Chatham, Prime Minister	William Villiers d. 1769; 3rd Earl of Jersey, etc., 6th Viscount Grandison	Thomas Villiers; 1709–1786; 1st Earl of Clarendon, etc.	Charlotte Capell; 1721–1790	Henry Hyde; 1710–1753; 5th Baron Hyde
George Mason-Villiers; 1751–1800; 2nd Earl Grandison, etc.	William Pitt "the Younger"; 1759–1806; Prime Minister	George Bussy Villiers; 1735–1805; 4th Earl of Jersey, etc., 7th Viscount Grandison
Earldom of Grandison (2nd creation) and Viscountcy Grandison (2nd creation) extinct, 1800
George Child Villiers; 1773–1859; 5th Earl of Jersey, etc., 8th Viscount Grandison	Thomas Villiers; 1753–1824; 2nd Earl of Clarendon, etc.	John Charles Villiers; 1757–1838; 3rd Earl of Clarendon, etc.	George Villiers; 1759–1827
George Augustus Frederick Child Villiers; 1808–1859; 6th Earl of Jersey, etc., 9th Viscount Grandison	George William Frederick Villiers; 1800–1870; 4th Earl of Clarendon, etc.	Thomas Hyde Villiers; 1801–1832 Charles Pelham Villiers; 1802–1893 Henry Montagu Villiers; 1813–1861
Victor Albert George Child Villiers; 1845–1915; 7th Earl of Jersey, etc., 10th Viscount Grandison	Edward Hyde Villiers; 1846–1914; 5th Earl of Clarendon, etc.	Francis Hyde Villiers; 1852–1925
George Henry Robert Child Villiers; 1873–1923; 8th Earl of Jersey, etc., 11th Viscount Grandison	George Herbert Hyde Villiers; 1877–1955; 6th Earl of Clarendon, etc.	Eric Hyde Villiers; 1881–1964
George Francis Child-Villiers; 1910–1998; 9th Earl of Jersey, etc., 12th Viscount Grandison	George Herbert Arthur Hyde Villiers; 1906–1935 styled Lord Hyde
George Henry Child Villiers; 1948–1998 styled Viscount Villiers	George Frederick "Laurence" Hyde Villiers; 1933–2009; 7th Earl of Clarendon, etc.	James Villiers; 1933–1998
George Francis "William" Child Villiers b. 1976; 10th Earl of Jersey, etc., 13th Viscount Grandison	George Edward Laurence Villiers b. 1976; 8th Earl of Clarendon, etc.
George Henry William Child Villiers b. 2015 styled Viscount Villiers	Edward George James Villiers b. 2008 styled Lord Hyde
Heir apparent to the Earl of Jersey	Heir apparent to the Earl of Clarendon

== See also ==
- Rochester, Kent
