= Earl of Clarendon =

Earldom in the Peerage of Great Britain

Earldom of Clarendon
- Argent, on a cross Gules five escallops Or.
- Creation date: 14 June 1776
- Peerage: Peerage of Great Britain
- First holder: Thomas Villiers
- Present holder: George Villiers
- Heir apparent: Edward Villiers
- Seat: Holywell House

Earl of Clarendon is a title that has been created twice in British history, in 1661 and 1776.

The family seat is Holywell House, near Swanmore, Hampshire.

== First creation of the title ==
The title was created for the first time in the Peerage of England in 1661 for the statesman Edward Hyde, 1st Baron Hyde. He was Chancellor of the Exchequer from 1643 to 1646 and Lord Chancellor from 1658 to 1667 and a close political adviser to Charles II, although he later fell out of favour and was forced into exile. Hyde had already been created Baron Hyde, of Hindon in the County of Wiltshire, in 1660, and was made Viscount Cornbury, in the County of Oxford, at the same time he was given the earldom. These titles were also in the Peerage of England. His second son Laurence Hyde was also a politician and was created Earl of Rochester in 1682. Lord Clarendon's daughter Anne Hyde married the future King James II and was the mother of Queen Mary II and Queen Anne.

Lord Clarendon was succeeded by his eldest son Henry, the second Earl. He was also a politician and served as Lord Privy Seal and Lord Lieutenant of Ireland. His son, the third Earl, represented Wiltshire and Christchurch in the House of Commons and served as Governor of New York, before succeeding to the earldom; he had married Katherine, 8th Baroness Clifton, but she died in New York before becoming Countess of Clarendon. Their only son Edward Hyde, Viscount Cornbury, succeeded his mother as ninth Baron Clifton in 1706; he died ten years before his father, unmarried. The only daughter Lady Theodosia succeeded her elder brother as tenth Baroness Clifton (see the Baron Clifton for later history of this title).

Lord Clarendon was succeeded by his first cousin Henry Hyde, 2nd Earl of Rochester, who became the fourth Earl of Clarendon; he was the only son of the first Earl of Rochester. He had earlier represented Launceston in the House of Commons and served as Lord Lieutenant of Cornwall. His only surviving son and heir apparent Henry Hyde, Viscount Cornbury, was summoned to the House of Lords through a writ of acceleration in his father's junior title of Baron Hyde in 1751. However, he died childless in April 1753, eight months before the death of his father. Consequently, on Lord Clarendon's death in December 1753 all the titles became extinct.

== Second creation of the title ==
Lady Jane Hyde, eldest daughter of the fourth Earl of Clarendon, married William Capell, 3rd Earl of Essex. Their daughter Lady Charlotte Capell married the prominent diplomat and politician Thomas Villiers, second son of William Villiers, 2nd Earl of Jersey. Villiers was Envoy to Vienna and Berlin and served as Joint Postmaster General and as Chancellor of the Duchy of Lancaster. In 1748 he was made a Baron of the Kingdom of Prussia, an honour which he received Royal licence to use in Great Britain, and in 1756 the barony of Hyde held by his wife's ancestors was revived when he was raised to the Peerage of Great Britain as Baron Hyde, of Hindon in the County of Wiltshire. In 1776 the earldom of Clarendon was also revived when he was made Earl of Clarendon in the Peerage of Great Britain.

The Hyde barony was created with a remainder to the heirs male of the body of Thomas Villiers by his wife, Charlotte, failing which to Charlotte and the heirs male of her body.

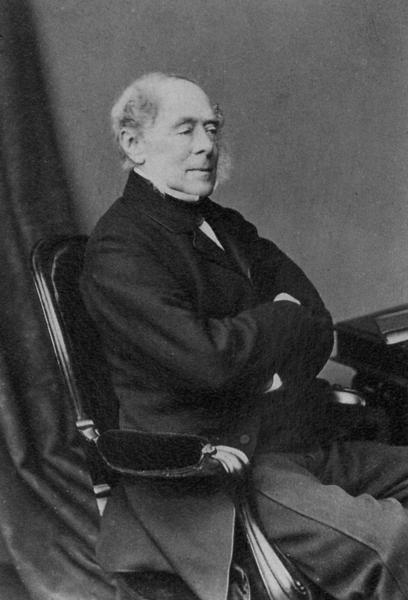
George Villiers, 4th Earl of Clarendon

Lord Clarendon was succeeded by his eldest son, the second Earl. He sat as Member of Parliament for Christchurch and Helston. He never married and was succeeded by his younger brother, the third Earl. He represented several constituencies in the House of Commons and served as Comptroller of the Household between 1789 and 1790. He had one daughter but no sons and was succeeded by his nephew, the fourth Earl. He was the eldest son of George Villiers (1759–1827), third son of the first Earl. Known as the "Great Lord Clarendon", he was a prominent diplomat and Liberal politician. He was three times Foreign Secretary of the United Kingdom and also served as Lord Privy Seal, Chancellor of the Duchy of Lancaster, President of the Board of Trade and Lord Lieutenant of Ireland.

Lord Clarendon was succeeded by his second but eldest surviving son, the fifth Earl. In early life he briefly represented Brecon in the House of Commons as a Liberal but later joined the Conservative Party and held minor office from 1895 to 1905 under Lord Salisbury and Arthur Balfour. On his death the titles passed to his only son, the sixth Earl. He was a Conservative politician and served under Bonar Law and Stanley Baldwin as Captain of the Honourable Corps of Gentlemen-at-Arms and Under-Secretary of State for Dominion Affairs. He was later Governor-General of South Africa from 1931 to 1937. His grandson, George, the seventh Earl, who succeeded in 1955 died in July 2009. He was the only son of George Herbert Arthur Edward Hyde Villiers, Lord Hyde, who died in 1935. The title has passed to his son, George, eighth earl.

As descendants of the second Earl of Jersey, the Earls of Clarendon are also in remainder to that peerage and its subsidiary titles.

Several other members of this branch of the Villiers family have also gained distinction. Thomas Hyde Villiers, second son of George Villiers (third son of the first Earl), represented three constituencies in the House of Commons before his early death in 1832. His son Reverend Charles Villiers was the father of 1) Edward Cecil Villiers, a Rear-Admiral in the Royal Navy, whose son Sir Michael Villiers was a vice-admiral in the Royal Navy and Fourth Sea Lord from 1960 to 1963, and 2) Ernest Amherst Villiers, Liberal Member of Parliament for Brighton from 1906 to 1910. The successful businessman and racehorse owner Charles Villiers (born 1963) who co-founded the local newspaper company Score Press Limited, which was sold for £155 million in 2005, is the great-great-great grandson of the aforementioned Thomas Villiers MP. Charles Pelham Villiers, third son of George Villiers, was a prominent Liberal politician and served as President of the Poor Law Board (with a seat in the cabinet) from 1859 to 1866. Between 1890 and 1898 he was Father of the House of Commons.

The Conservative politician Theresa Villiers is the great-great-great-granddaughter of Edward Ernest Villiers, fourth son of George Villiers. Henry Montagu Villiers, fifth son of George Villiers, was Bishop of Durham from 1860 until his death the following year. Sir Francis Hyde Villiers, fourth and youngest son of the fourth Earl, was a diplomat and served as British Ambassador to Belgium from 1919 to 1920. His grandson was the actor James Villiers.

The family main home is Holywell House, Swanmore, Hampshire. The family's main home from 1753 to 1923 was the largest of the three main manors of Watford, the Grove, which is today a hotel in Sarratt (civil parish).

The Earls of Clarendon had the property of Kenilworth Castle in 1670-1937.

== Earls of Clarendon, First creation (1661) ==
- Edward Hyde, 1st Earl of Clarendon (1609–1674)
- Henry Hyde, 2nd Earl of Clarendon (1638–1709)
- Edward Hyde, 3rd Earl of Clarendon (1661–1723)
  - Edward Hyde, Viscount Cornbury, 9th Baron Clifton (1691–1713)
- Henry Hyde, 4th Earl of Clarendon, 2nd Earl of Rochester (1672–1753)
  - Henry Hyde, Viscount Cornbury, 5th Baron Hyde (1710–1753)

== Earls of Clarendon, Second creation (1776) ==
- Thomas Villiers, 1st Earl of Clarendon (1709–1786)
- Thomas Villiers, 2nd Earl of Clarendon (1753–1824)
- John Charles Villiers, 3rd Earl of Clarendon (1757–1838)
- George William Frederick Villiers, 4th Earl of Clarendon (1800–1870)
  - Edward Hyde Villiers, Lord Hyde (1845–1846)
- Edward Hyde Villiers, 5th Earl of Clarendon (1846–1914)
- George Herbert Hyde Villiers, 6th Earl of Clarendon (1877–1955)
  - George Herbert Arthur Edward Hyde Villiers, Lord Hyde (1906–1935)
- George Frederick Laurence Hyde Villiers, 7th Earl of Clarendon (1933–2009)
- George Edward Laurence Villiers, 8th Earl of Clarendon (b. 1976)

== Family tree ==
Villiers family tree including the Dukes of Buckingham (2nd creation), Earls of Clarendon, Earls of Jersey, and Earls of Rochester

John St John by 1495–1558
Nicholas St. John by 1526–1589
Viscount Grandison of Limerick, 1620; Baron Tregoz, 1626	Earl (Countess) of Buckingham (5th creation), 1618
John St. John c. 1552–1594	Oliver St. John c. 1560–1630; 1st Viscount Grandison, etc.	Mary (Beaumont) Villiers c. 1570–1632; Countess of Buckingham	George Villiers (of Brokesby) c. 1544–1606
Barony Tregoz extinct, 1630	Earldom for life only, extinct 1632
Viscount Villiers and Baron Whaddon, 1616; Earl of Buckingham (4th creation), 1617; Marquess of Buckingham (1st creation), 1618
Villiers baronets, 1619	Viscount Purbeck and Baron Villiers of Stoke, 1619	Duke of Buckingham (2nd creation) and Earl of Coventry (1st creation), 1623	Earl of Anglesey (1st creation) and Baron Villiers of Daventry, 1623
William Villiers c. 1575–1629; 1st Baronet	Susan (Villiers) Feilding; 1583–1652 (m. William Feilding, 1st Earl of Denbigh)	Barbara St John	Edward Villiers c. 1585–1626	John Villiers c. 1591–1658; Viscount Purbeck, etc.	Katherine Manners; 1603–1649; Baroness de Ros	George Villiers; 1592–1628; 1st Duke of Buckingham, etc.	Christopher Villiers c. 1593–1630; 1st Earl of Anglesey, etc.
Viscountcy of Purbeck extinct, 1658
Baron Hyde of Hindon (1st creation), 1660; Earl of Clarendon (1st creation) and Viscount Cornbury, 1661
George Villiers; 1620–1682; 2nd Baronet	William Villiers; 1614–1643; 2nd Viscount Grandison	John Villiers c. 1616–1659; 3rd Viscount Grandison	George Villiers; 1618–1699; 4th Viscount Grandison	Edward Villiers; 1620–1689	George Villiers; 1628–1687; 2nd Duke of Buckingham, etc., Baron de Ros	Christopher Villiers d. 1661; 2nd Earl of Anglesey, etc.	Edward Hyde; 1609–1674; 1st Earl of Clarendon, etc.
Dukedom of Buckingham (2nd creation) and subsidiary titles extinct, 1687	Earldom of Anglesey (1st creation) and subsidiary title extinct extinct, 1661
Earl of Rochester 2nd creation, Viscount Hyde, and Baron Wotton Basset, 1682
George Villiers; 1645–1712; 3rd Baronet	Barbara (Villiers) Palmer; 1640–1709; Duchess of Cleveland, Countess of Castlemaine, Baroness Nonsuch	King Charles II; 1630–1685	King James II; 1633–1701	Anne Hyde; 1637–1671	Henry Hyde; 1638–1709; 2nd Earl of Clarendon, etc.	Laurence Hyde; 1642–1711; 1st Earl of Rochester, etc.
Villiars Baronets extinct, 1712	Viscount Villiers and Baron Villiers of Hoo, 1691; Earl of Jersey, 1697
Edward FitzGerald-Villiers c. 1654–1693	Edward Villiers c. 1656–1711; 1st Earl of Jersey, etc.	Queen Mary II; 1662–1694	Queen Anne; 1665–1714	Edward Hyde; 1661–1723; 3rd Earl of Clarendon, etc.	Henry Hyde; 1672–1753; 4th Earl of Clarendon, etc., 2nd Earl of Rochester, etc.
Earldom of Clarendon (1st creation) and subsidiary titles extinct, 1753
Earl Grandison (1st creation), 1721
John Villiers c. 1684–1766; Earl Grandison, 5th Viscount Grandison	Harriet Villiers; 1680–1736	William Villiers c. 1682–1721; 2nd Earl of Jersey, etc.	Jane Capell; 1694–1724; Countess of Essex
Earldom of Grandison (1st creation) extinct, 1766
Viscount Grandison (2nd creation), 1746; Earl Grandison (2nd creation), 1767	Baron Hyde of Hindon (2nd creation), 1756; Earl of Clarendon (2nd creation), 1776
James FitzGerald-Villiers; 1708–1732 styled Lord Villiers	Elizabeth Villiers d. 1782; 1st Countess Grandison, etc.	William Pitt "the Elder"; 1708–1778; Earl of Chatham, Prime Minister	William Villiers d. 1769; 3rd Earl of Jersey, etc., 6th Viscount Grandison	Thomas Villiers; 1709–1786; 1st Earl of Clarendon, etc.	Charlotte Capell; 1721–1790	Mary Capell d. 1782 (m. Henry Seymour, Lord Beauchamp)	Henry Hyde; 1710–1753; 5th Baron Hyde
George Mason-Villiers; 1751–1800; 2nd Earl Grandison, etc.	William Pitt "the Younger"; 1759–1806; Prime Minister	George Bussy Villiers; 1735–1805; 4th Earl of Jersey, etc., 7th Viscount Grandison
Earldom of Grandison (2nd creation) and Viscountcy Grandison (2nd creation) extinct, 1800
Child added to name by royal license, 1819
George Child Villiers; 1773–1859; 5th Earl of Jersey, etc., 8th Viscount Grandison (m. Sarah Sophia Fay)	Thomas Villiers; 1753–1824; 2nd Earl of Clarendon, etc.	John Charles Villiers; 1757–1838; 3rd Earl of Clarendon, etc.	Maria Villiers; 1761–1844	George Villiers; 1759–1827
George Augustus Frederick Child Villiers; 1808–1859; 6th Earl of Jersey, etc., 9th Viscount Grandison	Francis John Robert Child Villiers; 1819–1862	George William Frederick Villiers; 1800–1870; 4th Earl of Clarendon, etc.	Thomas Hyde Villiers; 1801–1832 Charles Pelham Villiers; 1802–1893	Maria Theresa Lewis; 1803–1865 Henry Montagu Villiers; 1813–1861
Victor Albert George Child Villiers; 1845–1915; 7th Earl of Jersey, etc., 10th Viscount Grandison (m. Margaret Elizabeth Leigh)	Emily Theresa Russell; 1843–1927 (m. Odo Russell, 1st Baron Ampthill)	Edward Hyde Villiers; 1845–1846	Edward Hyde Villiers; 1846–1914; 5th Earl of Clarendon, etc.	Francis Hyde Villiers; 1852–1925
George Henry Robert Child Villiers; 1873–1923; 8th Earl of Jersey, etc., 11th Viscount Grandison	George Herbert Hyde Villiers; 1877–1955; 6th Earl of Clarendon, etc.	Eric Hyde Villiers; 1881–1964
George Francis Child-Villiers; 1910–1998; 9th Earl of Jersey, etc., 12th Viscount Grandison (m. Virginia Cherrill)	George Herbert Arthur Hyde Villiers; 1906–1935 styled Lord Hyde
George Henry Child Villiers; 1948–1998 styled Viscount Villiers	George Frederick "Laurence" Hyde Villiers; 1933–2009; 7th Earl of Clarendon, etc.	James Villiers; 1933–1998
George Francis "William" Child Villiers b. 1976; 10th Earl of Jersey, etc., 13th Viscount Grandison	George Edward Laurence Villiers b. 1976; 8th Earl of Clarendon, etc.
Amelie Natasha Sophia Child Villiers b. 2008	George Henry William Child Villiers b. 2015 styled Viscount Villiers	Edward George James Villiers b. 2008 styled Lord Hyde
Heir apparent to the Earl of Jersey	Heir apparent to the Earl of Clarendon

== Present peer ==
George Edward Laurence Villiers, 8th Earl of Clarendon (b. 12 February 1976) is the only son of the 7th Earl and his wife Jane Diana Dawson. He married Bryonie V. L. Leask, daughter of Major-General Anthony de Camborne Lowther Leask, while still styled as Lord Hyde. They have three sons:

- Edward George James Villiers b. 17 April 2008
- Frederick Henry Alexander Villiers b. 29 October 2009
- Cosmo Thomas Laurence Villiers b. 21 March 2013

On 4 July 2009 he succeeded as Earl of Clarendon (second creation, 1776) and Baron Hyde of Hindon (1756).

The heir is the present holder's eldest son Edward George James Villiers, Lord Hyde (b. 2008).

== See also ==
- Clarendon Palace
- Earl of Jersey
- Earl of Rochester
- Sir Nicholas Hyde
- Town Hall, Wootton Bassett
