= Earl of Jersey =

Title in the Peerage of England

- Quarterly, 1st and 4th, argent on a cross gules five escallops or (for VILLIERS); 2nd and 3rd, gules a chevron engrailed ermine between three eaglets argent gorged or (for CHILD)
- Creation date: 13 October 1697
- Created by: King William III
- Peerage: Peerage of England
- First holder: Edward Villiers, 1st Viscount Villiers
- Present holder: William Child Villiers, 10th Earl of Jersey
- Heir apparent: George Child Villiers, Viscount Villiers
- Remainder to: 1st Earl's heirs male of the body lawfully begotten
- Subsidiary titles: Viscount Grandison (Ireland); Viscount Villiers (England); Baron Villiers (England)
- Seat: Radier Manor
- Former seat: Osterley Park
- Motto: Fidei coticula crux (Latin for 'The cross is the touchstone of faith')

Earl of Jersey is a title in the Peerage of England. It is held by a branch of the Villiers family, which since 1819 has been the Child Villiers family.

== History ==
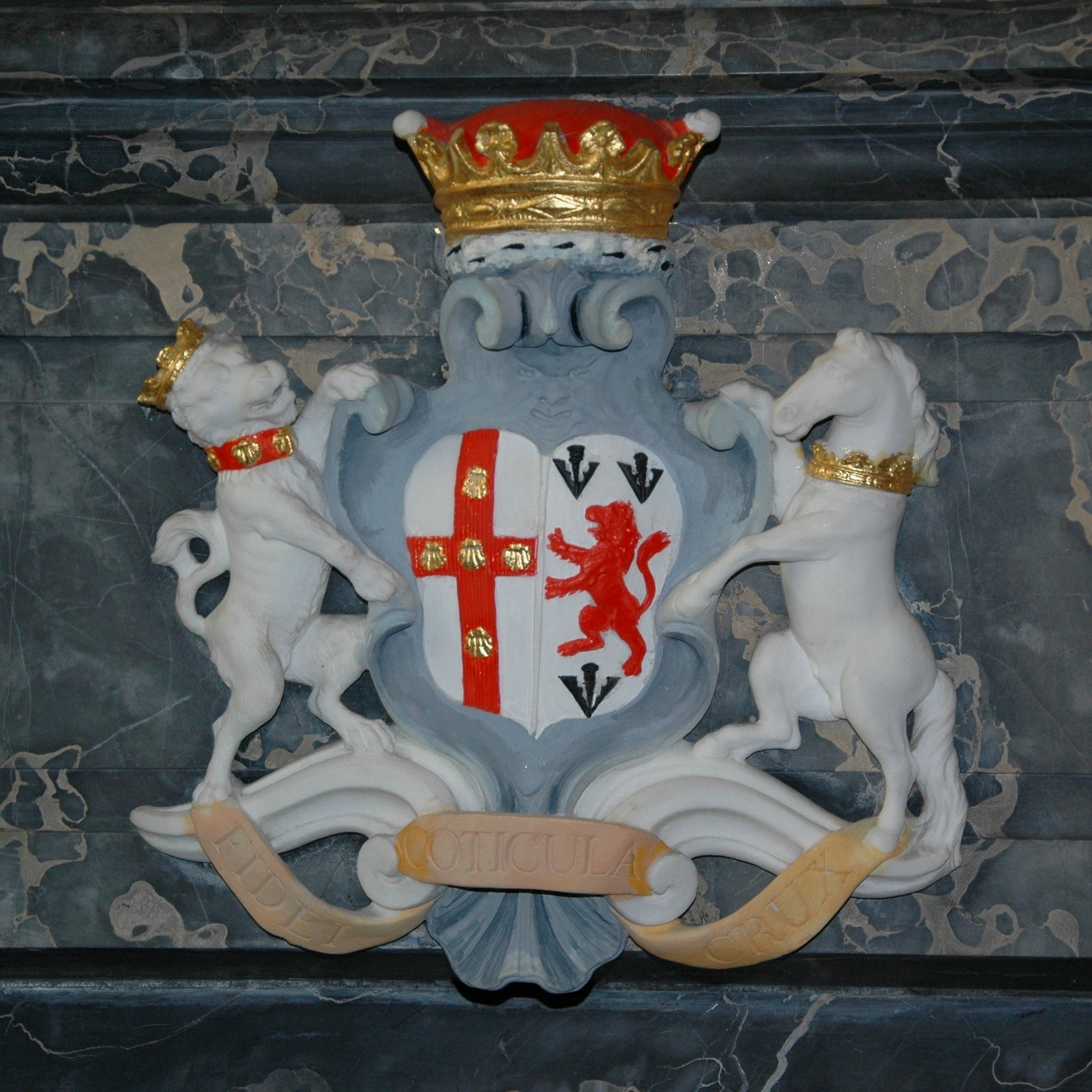
Coat of arms of the 3rd Earl of Jersey at Middleton Stoney church, impaled with the arms of Egerton, his in-laws

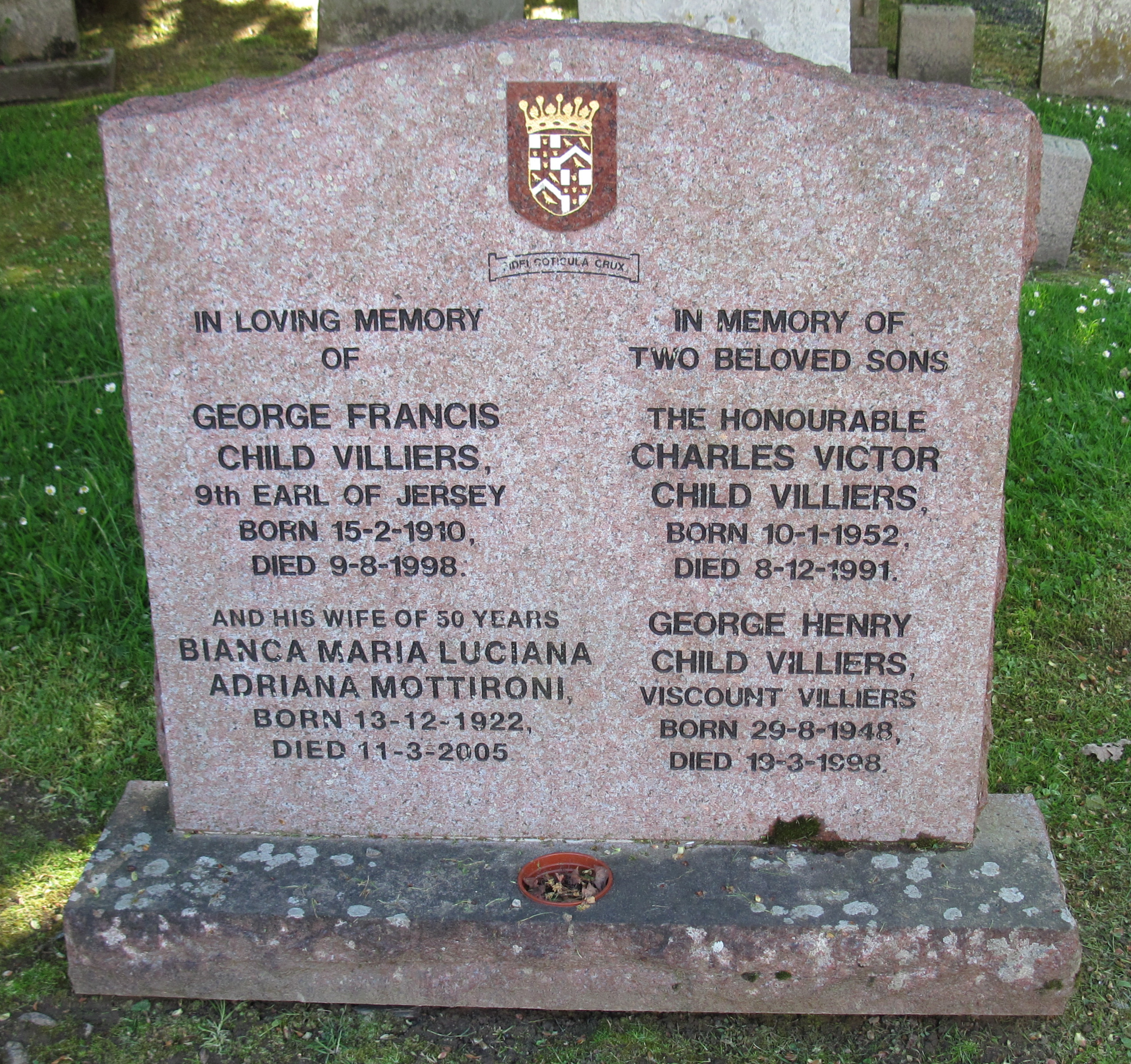
Monument of the 9th Earl of Jersey, showing the family's current arms

The earldom was created in 1697 for the statesman Edward Villiers, 1st Viscount Villiers, Ambassador to France from 1698 to 1699 and Secretary of State for the Southern Department from 1699 to 1700. He had already been created Baron Villiers, of Hoo in the County of Kent, and Viscount Villiers, of Dartford in the County of Kent, in 1691, also in the Peerage of England.

A member of the prominent Villiers family, he was the grandson of Sir Edward Villiers, brother of Sir William Villiers, 1st Baronet, of Brooksby, and half-brother of the following: the 1st Duke of Buckingham; the 1st Earl of Anglesey; and the 1st Viscount Purbeck. He was succeeded by his son, the second Earl. He represented Kent in the House of Commons from 1705 to 1708. On his death, the titles passed to his eldest son, the third Earl. In 1766, he succeeded his second cousin John Villiers, 1st Earl Grandison, as sixth Viscount Grandison through a special remainder in the letters patent.

His son, the fourth Earl, was a politician and served as Vice-Chamberlain of the Household, as Master of the Buckhounds and as Captain of the Honourable Band of Gentlemen Pensioners. He was succeeded by his son, the fifth Earl. He was a Tory politician and served as Lord Chamberlain of the Household and as Master of the Horse. Lord Jersey married Sarah Sophia (died 1867), daughter of John Fane, 10th Earl of Westmorland, and his wife Sarah Anne (died 1793), daughter of Robert Child. Through this marriage, the private bank Child & Co. came into the Villiers family.

On account of the considerable wealth brought to the family through this marriage, in 1819, Lord Jersey assumed by Royal licence the surname and arms of Child, and since then the branch of the family has been known as Child-Villiers. On his death, the titles passed to his son, the sixth Earl. He sat as Conservative Member of Parliament for Rochester, Minehead, Honiton and Weymouth and Melcombe Regis and Cirencester. He succeeded in the earldom on 3 October 1859 and died on 24 October 1859, having held the title for only twenty-one days. Lord Jersey married Julia, daughter of Prime Minister Sir Robert Peel, 2nd Baronet, in 1841.

He was succeeded by his son, the seventh Earl. He served in the second Conservative administration of Lord Salisbury as Paymaster General from 1889 to 1890 and was Governor of New South Wales from 1890 to 1893. On his death in 1915, the titles passed to his eldest son, the eighth Earl. He served briefly under David Lloyd George as a Lord-in-waiting (government whip in the House of Lords) from January to August 1919. In 1923, he sold Child & Co to Glyn, Mills & Co. His son, the ninth Earl, was a Major in the Royal Artillery (TA).

As of 2017 the titles are held by the latter's grandson, the tenth Earl, who succeeded in 1998. He is the eldest son of George Henry Villiers, Viscount Villiers (1948–1998), eldest son of the ninth Earl. Lord Jersey is an actor, writer and producer, known professionally as William Villiers.

The heirs apparent to the earldom alternate the use of the two viscomital titles as their courtesy title. The tenth Earl was briefly styled Viscount Grandison between the deaths of his father, Viscount Villiers, and his grandfather, the ninth Earl, and so the next heir is therefore styled Viscount Villiers.

The present family seat is Radier Manor, on the island of Jersey. Previous family seats were Middleton Park in Oxfordshire and Osterley Park in Middlesex.

The Earls of Jersey are also in remainder of the title of Duke of Marlborough, for being descendants of one of the daughters of his daughters, by primogeniture, and their heirs male of the 1st Duke.

The parish church of All Saints at Middleton Stoney, near Middleton Park, is the burial place of most of the Earls of Jersey.

== Earl of Clarendon ==
Another member of the family to gain distinction was the Hon. Thomas Villiers, second son of the second Earl. He was created Earl of Clarendon in 1776 (see this title for more information on this branch of the family).

== Jacobite earldoms of Jersey ==
In April 1716, two Jacobite earldoms of Jersey were created by the Old Pretender, the first for Barbara, née Chiffinch, the widow of the first Earl of the 1697 creation, and the other for their eldest son (who succeeded as second Earl of the 1697 creation) with the subsidiary titles Viscount Dartford and Baron Hoo. The first became extinct on the Countess's death in 1735.

== Earls of Jersey (1697) ==
- Edward Villiers, 1st Earl of Jersey (1656–1711)
- William Villiers, 2nd Earl of Jersey (died 1721)
- William Villiers, 3rd Earl of Jersey (died 1769)
  - Frederick William Villiers, Viscount Villiers (1734–1742)
- George Bussy Villiers, 4th Earl of Jersey (1735–1805)
- George Child Villiers, 5th Earl of Jersey (1773–1859)
- George Augustus Frederick Child Villiers, 6th Earl of Jersey (1808–1859)
- Victor Albert George Child Villiers, 7th Earl of Jersey (1845–1915)
- George Henry Robert Child Villiers, 8th Earl of Jersey (1873–1923)
- George Francis Child Villiers, 9th Earl of Jersey (1910–1998)
  - George Child Villiers, Viscount Villiers (1948–1998)
- (George Francis) William Child Villiers, 10th Earl of Jersey (born 1976)

The heir apparent is the present holder's only son, George Henry William Child Villiers, Viscount Villiers (born 2015)

== Arms ==
Coat of arms of Child Villiers, Earls of Jersey
Crest 1st, A lion rampant argent ducally crowned or; 2nd, On a rock proper, an eagle rising argent ducally gorged or, holding in the beak an adder proper, and charged on the breast, for distinction, with an ermine spot. Escutcheon Quarterly 1st and 4th Argent, on a cross gules five escallops or (Villiers); 2nd and 3rd Gules, a chevron engrailed ermine between three eaglets argent ducally gorged or, and in the chief point for distinction an escallop or (Child). Supporters Two lions argent ducally crowned or and gorged with a plain collar gules charged with three escallops or. Motto Fidei coticula crux (The cross is the test of faith).

== Family tree ==
Villiers family tree including the Dukes of Buckingham (2nd creation), Earls of Clarendon, Earls of Jersey, and Earls of Rochester

John St John by 1495–1558
Nicholas St. John by 1526–1589
Viscount Grandison of Limerick, 1620; Baron Tregoz, 1626	Earl (Countess) of Buckingham (5th creation), 1618
John St. John c. 1552–1594	Oliver St. John c. 1560–1630; 1st Viscount Grandison, etc.	Mary (Beaumont) Villiers c. 1570–1632; Countess of Buckingham	George Villiers (of Brokesby) c. 1544–1606
Barony Tregoz extinct, 1630	Earldom for life only, extinct 1632
Viscount Villiers and Baron Whaddon, 1616; Earl of Buckingham (4th creation), 1617; Marquess of Buckingham (1st creation), 1618
Villiers baronets, 1619	Viscount Purbeck and Baron Villiers of Stoke, 1619	Duke of Buckingham (2nd creation) and Earl of Coventry (1st creation), 1623	Earl of Anglesey (1st creation) and Baron Villiers of Daventry, 1623
William Villiers c. 1575–1629; 1st Baronet	Susan (Villiers) Feilding; 1583–1652 (m. William Feilding, 1st Earl of Denbigh)	Barbara St John	Edward Villiers c. 1585–1626	John Villiers c. 1591–1658; Viscount Purbeck, etc.	Katherine Manners; 1603–1649; Baroness de Ros	George Villiers; 1592–1628; 1st Duke of Buckingham, etc.	Christopher Villiers c. 1593–1630; 1st Earl of Anglesey, etc.
Viscountcy of Purbeck extinct, 1658
Baron Hyde of Hindon (1st creation), 1660; Earl of Clarendon (1st creation) and Viscount Cornbury, 1661
George Villiers; 1620–1682; 2nd Baronet	William Villiers; 1614–1643; 2nd Viscount Grandison	John Villiers c. 1616–1659; 3rd Viscount Grandison	George Villiers; 1618–1699; 4th Viscount Grandison	Edward Villiers; 1620–1689	George Villiers; 1628–1687; 2nd Duke of Buckingham, etc., Baron de Ros	Christopher Villiers d. 1661; 2nd Earl of Anglesey, etc.	Edward Hyde; 1609–1674; 1st Earl of Clarendon, etc.
Dukedom of Buckingham (2nd creation) and subsidiary titles extinct, 1687	Earldom of Anglesey (1st creation) and subsidiary title extinct extinct, 1661
Earl of Rochester 2nd creation, Viscount Hyde, and Baron Wotton Basset, 1682
George Villiers; 1645–1712; 3rd Baronet	Barbara (Villiers) Palmer; 1640–1709; Duchess of Cleveland, Countess of Castlemaine, Baroness Nonsuch	King Charles II; 1630–1685	King James II; 1633–1701	Anne Hyde; 1637–1671	Henry Hyde; 1638–1709; 2nd Earl of Clarendon, etc.	Laurence Hyde; 1642–1711; 1st Earl of Rochester, etc.
Villiars Baronets extinct, 1712	Viscount Villiers and Baron Villiers of Hoo, 1691; Earl of Jersey, 1697
Edward FitzGerald-Villiers c. 1654–1693	Edward Villiers c. 1656–1711; 1st Earl of Jersey, etc.	Queen Mary II; 1662–1694	Queen Anne; 1665–1714	Edward Hyde; 1661–1723; 3rd Earl of Clarendon, etc.	Henry Hyde; 1672–1753; 4th Earl of Clarendon, etc., 2nd Earl of Rochester, etc.
Earldom of Clarendon (1st creation) and subsidiary titles extinct, 1753
Earl Grandison (1st creation), 1721
John Villiers c. 1684–1766; Earl Grandison, 5th Viscount Grandison	Harriet Villiers; 1680–1736	William Villiers c. 1682–1721; 2nd Earl of Jersey, etc.	Jane Capell; 1694–1724; Countess of Essex
Earldom of Grandison (1st creation) extinct, 1766
Viscount Grandison (2nd creation), 1746; Earl Grandison (2nd creation), 1767	Baron Hyde of Hindon (2nd creation), 1756; Earl of Clarendon (2nd creation), 1776
James FitzGerald-Villiers; 1708–1732 styled Lord Villiers	Elizabeth Villiers d. 1782; 1st Countess Grandison, etc.	William Pitt "the Elder"; 1708–1778; Earl of Chatham, Prime Minister	William Villiers d. 1769; 3rd Earl of Jersey, etc., 6th Viscount Grandison	Thomas Villiers; 1709–1786; 1st Earl of Clarendon, etc.	Charlotte Capell; 1721–1790	Mary Capell d. 1782 (m. Henry Seymour, Lord Beauchamp)	Henry Hyde; 1710–1753; 5th Baron Hyde
George Mason-Villiers; 1751–1800; 2nd Earl Grandison, etc.	William Pitt "the Younger"; 1759–1806; Prime Minister	George Bussy Villiers; 1735–1805; 4th Earl of Jersey, etc., 7th Viscount Grandison
Earldom of Grandison (2nd creation) and Viscountcy Grandison (2nd creation) extinct, 1800
Child added to name by royal license, 1819
George Child Villiers; 1773–1859; 5th Earl of Jersey, etc., 8th Viscount Grandison (m. Sarah Sophia Fay)	Thomas Villiers; 1753–1824; 2nd Earl of Clarendon, etc.	John Charles Villiers; 1757–1838; 3rd Earl of Clarendon, etc.	Maria Villiers; 1761–1844	George Villiers; 1759–1827
George Augustus Frederick Child Villiers; 1808–1859; 6th Earl of Jersey, etc., 9th Viscount Grandison	Francis John Robert Child Villiers; 1819–1862	George William Frederick Villiers; 1800–1870; 4th Earl of Clarendon, etc.	Thomas Hyde Villiers; 1801–1832 Charles Pelham Villiers; 1802–1893	Maria Theresa Lewis; 1803–1865 Henry Montagu Villiers; 1813–1861
Victor Albert George Child Villiers; 1845–1915; 7th Earl of Jersey, etc., 10th Viscount Grandison (m. Margaret Elizabeth Leigh)	Emily Theresa Russell; 1843–1927 (m. Odo Russell, 1st Baron Ampthill)	Edward Hyde Villiers; 1845–1846	Edward Hyde Villiers; 1846–1914; 5th Earl of Clarendon, etc.	Francis Hyde Villiers; 1852–1925
George Henry Robert Child Villiers; 1873–1923; 8th Earl of Jersey, etc., 11th Viscount Grandison	George Herbert Hyde Villiers; 1877–1955; 6th Earl of Clarendon, etc.	Eric Hyde Villiers; 1881–1964
George Francis Child-Villiers; 1910–1998; 9th Earl of Jersey, etc., 12th Viscount Grandison (m. Virginia Cherrill)	George Herbert Arthur Hyde Villiers; 1906–1935 styled Lord Hyde
George Henry Child Villiers; 1948–1998 styled Viscount Villiers	George Frederick "Laurence" Hyde Villiers; 1933–2009; 7th Earl of Clarendon, etc.	James Villiers; 1933–1998
George Francis "William" Child Villiers b. 1976; 10th Earl of Jersey, etc., 13th Viscount Grandison	George Edward Laurence Villiers b. 1976; 8th Earl of Clarendon, etc.
Amelie Natasha Sophia Child Villiers b. 2008	George Henry William Child Villiers b. 2015 styled Viscount Villiers	Edward George James Villiers b. 2008 styled Lord Hyde
Heir apparent to the Earl of Jersey	Heir apparent to the Earl of Clarendon

== Line of succession ==
- Edward Villiers, 1st Earl of Jersey (1656-1711)
  - William Villiers, 2nd Earl of Jersey (died 1721)
    - William Villiers, 3rd Earl of Jersey (1707-1769)
      - George Bussy Villiers, 4th Earl of Jersey (1735-1805)
        - George Child-Villiers, 5th Earl of Jersey (1773-1859)
          - George Augustus Frederick Child-Villiers, 6th Earl of Jersey (1808–1859)
            - Victor Albert George Child-Villiers, 7th Earl of Jersey (1845–1915)
              - George Henry Robert Child-Villiers, 8th Earl of Jersey (1873–1923)
                - George Francis Child-Villiers, 9th Earl of Jersey (1910–1998)
                  - George Child Villiers, Viscount Villiers (1948–1998)
                    - (George Francis) William Child-Villiers, 10th Earl of Jersey (born 1976)
                      - (1) George Henry William Child-Villiers, Viscount Villiers (b. 2015)
                    - (2) Hon. Jamie Charles Child-Villiers (b. 1994)
                - Hon. Edward Masel Child-Villiers (1913-1980)
                  - (Edward) John Mansel Hugh Frampton Child-Villiers (1935-2002)
                    - (3) Alexander Child-Villiers (b. 1961)
                      - (4) Frederick Mansel Child-Villiers (b. 1990)
                      - (5) William Child-Villiers (b. 2003)
                  - (6) George Anthony Robert Child-Villiers (b. 1947)
    - Thomas Villiers, 1st Earl of Clarendon (1709–1786)
      - for further descendants, see the Earl of Clarendon

== See also ==
- Jersey
- Duke of Buckingham (1623 creation)
- Earl of Anglesey (1623 creation)
- Viscount Purbeck
- Earl of Clarendon (1776 creation)
- Viscount Grandison
- Villiers baronets
- Osterley Park
