= Marquess of Buckingham =

Marquessate in the Peerage of Great Britain

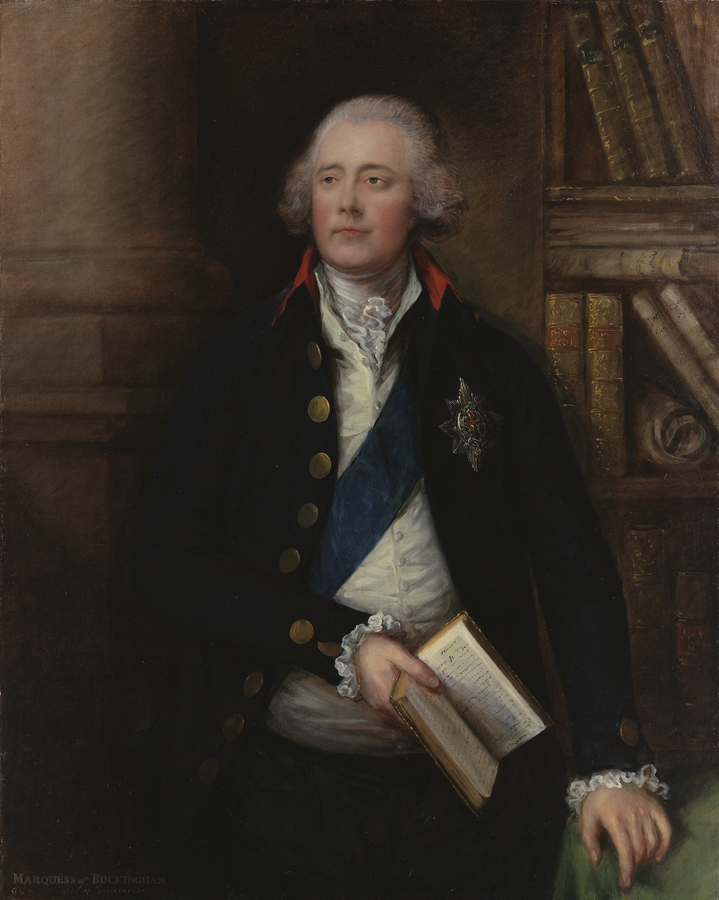
First Marquess of Buckingham

Marquess of Buckingham was a title that has been created two times in the peerages of England and Great Britain.

The first creation of the marquessate was in 1618 for George Villiers, a favourite of James I of England. He had previously been made Baron Whaddon, of Whaddon in the County of Buckingham, and Viscount Villiers in 1616, then Earl of Buckingham in 1617. Later he was also created Earl of Coventry and Duke of Buckingham in 1623. With his son's death in 1687, the title became extinct.

The second creation came in 1784, when George Nugent-Temple-Grenville, 3rd Earl Temple was made Marquess of Buckingham in the Peerage of Great Britain. He had been Lord Lieutenant of Ireland, Foreign Secretary, Home Secretary and Leader of the House of Lords. He was son of George Grenville, Prime Minister of Great Britain. However, on his grandson's death in 1889 without male issue, the marquessate of Buckingham became extinct.

== Marquesses of Buckingham (1618) ==
- George Villiers, 1st Marquess of Buckingham (1592–1628) (created Duke of Buckingham in 1623)

See Dukes of Buckingham

Villiers family tree: Dukes of Buckingham (2nd creation), Earl of Jersey, and Earl of Clarendon

Viscount Grandison of Limerick, 1620; Baron Tregoz, 1626	Earl (Countess) of Buckingham (5th creation), 1618
John St. John c. 1552–1594	Oliver St. John c. 1560–1630; 1st Viscount Grandison and Baron Tregoz of Highworth	George Villiers c. 1544–1606	Mary (Beaumont) Villiers c. 1570–1632; Countess of Buckingham
Barony Tregoz extinct, 1630	Earldom for life only, extinct 1632
Viscount Purbeck and Baron Villiers of Stoke, 1619	Viscount Villiers and Baron Whaddon, of Whaddon in the County of Buckingham, 1616; Earl of Buckingham (4th creation), 1617; Marquess of Buckingham (1st creation), 1618; Duke of Buckingham (2nd creation) and Earl of Coventry (1st creation), 1623	Earl of Anglesey (1st creation) and Baron Villiers, 1623
Barbara St John	Edward Villiers c. 1585–1626	John Villiers c. 1591–1658; Viscount Purbeck	George Villiers; 1592–1628; 1st Duke of Buckingham, Marquess of Buckingham, Earl of Buckingham, Earl of Coventry, Viscount Villiers, and Baron Whaddon	Christopher Villiers c. 1593–1630; 1st Earl of Anglesey
Viscountcy of Purbeck extinct, 1658
Baron Hyde of Hindon (1st creation), 1660; Earl of Clarendon (1st creation) and Viscount Cornbury, 1661
William Villiers; 1614–1643; 2nd Viscount Grandison	John Villiers c. 1616–1659; 3rd Viscount Grandison	George Villiers; 1618–1699; 4th Viscount Grandison	Edward Villiers; 1620–1689	George Villiers; 1628–1687; 2nd Duke of Buckingham, Marquess of Buckingham, Earl of Buckingham, Earl of Coventry, Viscount Villiers, and Baron Whaddon	Christopher Villiers d. 1661; 2nd Earl of Anglesey	Edward Hyde; 1609–1674; 1st Earl of Clarendon, Viscount Cornbury, and Baron Hyde
Dukedom of Buckingham (2nd creation) and subsidiary titles extinct, 1687	Viscountcy of Anglesey (1st creation) extinct, 1661
Barbara (Villiers) Palmer; 1640–1709; Duchess of Cleveland, Countess of Castlemaine, Baroness Nonsuch	King Charles II; 1630–1685	King James II; 1633–1701	Anne Hyde; 1637–1671	Henry Hyde; 1638–1709; 2nd Earl of Clarendon, Viscount Cornbury, and Baron Hyde	Laurence Hyde; 1642–1711; 1st Earl of Rochester
Viscount Villiers, 1691; Earl of Jersey, 1697
Edward FitzGerald-Villiers c. 1654–1693	Edward Villiers c. 1656–1711; 1st Earl of Jersey and Viscount Villiers	Queen Mary II; 1662–1694	Queen Anne; 1665–1714	Edward Hyde; 1661–1723; 3rd Earl of Clarendon, Viscount Cornbury, and Baron Hyde	Henry Hyde; 1672–1753; 2nd Earl of Rochester, 4th Earl of Clarendon, Viscount Cornbury, and Baron Hyde
Earldom of Clarendon (1st creation) and subsidiary titles extinct, 1753
Earl Grandison (1st creation), 1721
John Villiers c. 1684–1766; Earl Grandison, 5th Viscount Grandison	William Villiers c. 1682–1721; 2nd Earl of Jersey and Viscount Villiers	Jane Capell; 1694–1724; Countess of Essex
Earldom of Grandison (1st creation) extinct, 1766
Viscount Grandison (2nd creation), 1746; Earl Grandison (2nd creation), 1767	Baron Hyde (2nd creation), 1756; Earl of Clarendon (2nd creation), 1776
Elizabeth Villiers d. 1782; 1st Countess Grandison and Viscountess Grandison	William Villiers d. 1769; 3rd Earl of Jersey and Viscount Villiers, 6th Viscount Grandison	Thomas Villiers; 1709–1786; 1st Earl of Clarendon and Baron Hyde	Charlotte Capell; 1721–1790	Henry Hyde; 1710–1753; 5th Baron Hyde
George Mason-Villiers; 1751–1800; 2nd Earl Grandison and Viscount Grandison	George Bussy Villiers; 1735–1805; 4th Earl of Jersey and Viscount Villiers, 7th Viscount Grandison
Earldom of Grandison (2nd creation) and Viscountcy Grandison (2nd creation) extinct, 1800
George Child Villiers; 1773–1859; 5th Earl of Jersey and Viscount Villiers, 8th Viscount Grandison	Thomas Villiers; 1753–1824; 2nd Earl of Clarendon and Baron Hyde	John Charles Villiers; 1757–1838; 3rd Earl of Clarendon and Baron Hyde	George Villiers; 1759–1827
George Augustus Frederick Child Villiers; 1808–1859; 6th Earl of Jersey and Viscount Villiers, 9th Viscount Grandison	George William Frederick Villiers; 1800–1870; 4th Earl of Clarendon and Baron Hyde
Victor Albert George Child Villiers; 1845–1915; 7th Earl of Jersey and Viscount Villiers, 10th Viscount Grandison	Edward Hyde Villiers; 1846–1914; 5th Earl of Clarendon and Baron Hyde
George Henry Robert Child Villiers; 1873–1923; 8th Earl of Jersey and Viscount Villiers, 11th Viscount Grandison	George Herbert Hyde Villiers; 1877–1955; 6th Earl of Clarendon and Baron Hyde
George Francis Child-Villiers; 1910–1998; 9th Earl of Jersey and Viscount Villiers, 12th Viscount Grandison	George Herbert Arthur Hyde Villiers; 1906–1935 styled Lord Hyde
George Henry Child Villiers; 1948–1998 styled Viscount Villiers	George Frederick "Laurence" Hyde Villiers; 1933–2009; 7th Earl of Clarendon and Baron Hyde
George Francis "William" Child Villiers b. 1976; 10th Earl of Jersey and Viscount Villiers, 13th Viscount Grandison	George Edward Laurence Villiers b. 1976; 8th Earl of Clarendon and Baron Hyde
George Henry William Child Villiers b. 2015 styled Viscount Villiers	Edward George James Villiers b. 2008 styled Lord Hyde

== Marquesses of Buckingham (1784) ==
- George Nugent-Temple-Grenville, 1st Marquess of Buckingham (1753–1813)
- Richard Temple-Nugent-Brydges-Chandos-Grenville, 2nd Marquess of Buckingham (1776–1839) (created Duke of Buckingham and Chandos in 1822)

See Dukes of Buckingham and Chandos

Family tree of the Duke of Buckingham and Chandos, Marquess of Buckingham, Marquess of Chandos, Viscount Cobham, Earl Temple, Earl Temple of Stowe, Baron Cobham, Baron Grenville, Baron Lyttelton, Baron Westcote and Temple baronets

Peter Temple
Anthony Temple	John Temple
Baronet, of Stowe, in the County of Buckingham, 1611
William Temple; 1555–1627	Thomas Temple; 1567–1637; 1st Baronet, of Stowe	Alexander Temple; 1583–1629
Baronet, of Frankley, in the County of Worcester, 1618
John Temple; 1600–1677	Peter Temple; 1592–1653; 2nd Baronet, of Stowe	John Temple; 1593–1632	James Temple; 1606–1680	Thomas Lyttelton; 1593–1650; 1st Baronet, of Frankley
Baronet, of Stowe, in the County of Buckingham, 1662
Thomas Temple; 1613/14–1674; 1st Baronet, of Stowe	Peter Temple; 1613–1660	Henry Lyttelton; 1624–1693; 2nd Baronet, of Frankley	Charles Lyttelton; 1628–1716; 3rd Baronet, of Frankley
Baronetcy of Stowe (1662 creation) extinct, 1674
John Temple; 1632–1705	Richard Temple; 1634–1697; 3rd Baronet, of Stowe	Eleanor Temple d. 1729 m. Richard Grenville	William Temple d. 1706
Viscount Palmerston and Baron Temple, of Mount Temple in the County of Sligo, 1723	Baron Cobham, of Cobham in the County of Kent (6th creation), 1714; Viscount Cobham and Baron Cobham, of Cobham in the County of Kent (7th creation), 1718	Earl Temple, 1749
Henry Temple c. 1673–1757; 1st Viscount Palmerston and Baron Temple	Richard Temple; 1675–1749; 1st Viscount Cobham and Baron Cobham, 4th Baronet, of Stowe	Hester Grenville c. 1690–1752; 1st Countess Temple, 2nd Viscountess Cobham and 2nd Baroness Cobham	Richard Grenville; 1678–1727	Christian Temple	Thomas Lyttelton; 1686–1751; 4th Baronet, of Frankley	William Temple; 1694–1760; 5th Baronet, of Stowe	Peter Temple d. 1761; 6th Baronet, of Stowe
Barony of Cobham (1714 creation) extinct, 1749
Henry, Lord Temple	Richard Temple; 1731–1786; 7th Baronet, of Stowe
Baron Lyttelton (1st creation), 1756	Baron Westcote, 1776; Baron Lyttelton (2nd creation), 1794	Baronetcy of Stowe dormant, 1786
Henry Temple; 1739–1802; 2nd Viscount Palmerston and Baron Temple	Richard Grenville-Temple; 1711–1779; 2nd Earl Temple, 3rd Viscount Cobham and Baron Cobham	George Grenville; 1712–1770	Hester Grenville; 1720–1803; Baroness Chatham m. William Pitt the Elder, Earl of Chatham and Viscount Pitt	George Lyttelton; 1709–1773; 1st Baron Lyttelton, 5th Baronet, of Frankley	William Henry Lyttelton; 1724–1808; 1st Baron Lyttelton
Marquess of Buckingham (2nd creation), 1784	Baron Grenville, of Wotton under Bernewood in the County of Buckingham, 1790
George Nugent-Temple-Grenville; 1753–1813; 1st Marquess of Buckingham, 3rd Earl Temple, 2nd Earl Nugent, 4th Viscount Cobham and Baron Cobham	William Wyndham Grenville; 1759–1834; 1st Baron Grenville	William Pitt the Younger; 1759–1806	Thomas Lyttelton; 1744–1779; 2nd Baron Lyttelton, 5th Baronet, of Frankley
Barony of Grenville extinct, 1834	Barony of Lyttelton and Baronetcy of Frankley extinct, 1779
Duke of Buckingham and Chandos, Marquess of Chandos and Earl Temple of Stowe, 1822
Henry John Temple; 1784–1865; 3rd Viscount Palmerston and Baron Temple	Richard Temple-Nugent-Brydges-Chandos-Grenville; 1776–1839; 1st Duke of Buckingham and Chandos, Marquess of Chandos, and Earl Temple of Stowe, 2nd Marquess of Buckingham, 3rd Earl Nugent, 4th Earl Temple, 5th Viscount Cobham and Baron Cobham	George Fulke Lyttelton; 1763–1828; 2nd Baron Lyttelton	William Henry Lyttelton; 1782–1837; 3rd Baron Lyttelton
Richard Plantagenet Temple-Nugent-Brydges-Chandos-Grenville; 1797–1861; 2nd Duke of Buckingham and Chandos, Marquess of Chandos, and Earl Temple of Stowe, 3rd Marquess of Buckingham, 4th Earl Nugent, 6th Viscount Cobham and Baron Cobham
Richard Plantagenet Campbell Temple-Nugent-Brydges-Chandos-Grenville; 1823–1889; 3rd Duke of Buckingham and Chandos, Marquess of Chandos, and Earl Temple of Stowe, 4th Marquess of Buckingham, 5th Earl Nugent, 6th Earl Temple, 7th Viscount Cobham and Baron Cobham	Anna Eliza Mary (Temple-Nugent-Brydges-Chandos-Grenville) Gore-Langton; 1820–1879	William Henry Powell Gore-Langton; 1824–1873	George William Lyttelton; 1817–1876; 4th Baron Lyttelton
Dukedom of Buckingham and Chandos, Marquessates of Buckingham and Chandos, and the Earldoms of Temple (1st creation) and of Nugent extinct, 1889
William Stephen Temple-Gore-Langton; 1847–1902; 4th Earl Temple of Stowe	Charles George Lyttelton; 1842–1922; 8th Viscount Cobham and Baron Cobham
Algernon William Stephen Temple-Gore-Langton; 1871–1940; 5th Earl Temple of Stowe	Chandos Graham Temple-Gore-Langton; 1873–1921	Evelyn Arthur Grenville Temple-Gore-Langton; 1884–1972	John Cavendish Lyttelton; 1881–1949; 9th Viscount Cobham and Baron Cobham
Chandos Grenville Temple-Gore-Langton; 1909–1966; 6th Earl Temple of Stowe	Ronald Stephen Brydges Temple-Gore-Langton; 1910–1988; 7th Earl Temple of Stowe	Walter Grenville Algernon Temple-Gore-Langton; 1924–2013; 8th Earl Temple of Stowe	Charles John Lyttelton; 1909–1977; 10th Viscount Cobham and Baron Cobham
James Grenville Temple-Gore-Langton b. 1955; 9th Earl Temple of Stowe	John William Leonard Lyttelton; 1943–2006; 11th Viscount Cobham and Baron Cobham	Christopher Charles Lyttelton b. 1947; 12th Viscount Cobham and Baron Cobham
Rowan Caradoc Temple-Gore-Langton b. 1987	Oliver Christopher Lyttelton b. 1976
Heir apparent to the Earl Temple of Stowe	Heir apparent to the Viscount Cobham

== See also ==
- Earls of Buckingham
