= Viscount Grandison =

Title in the peerage of Ireland

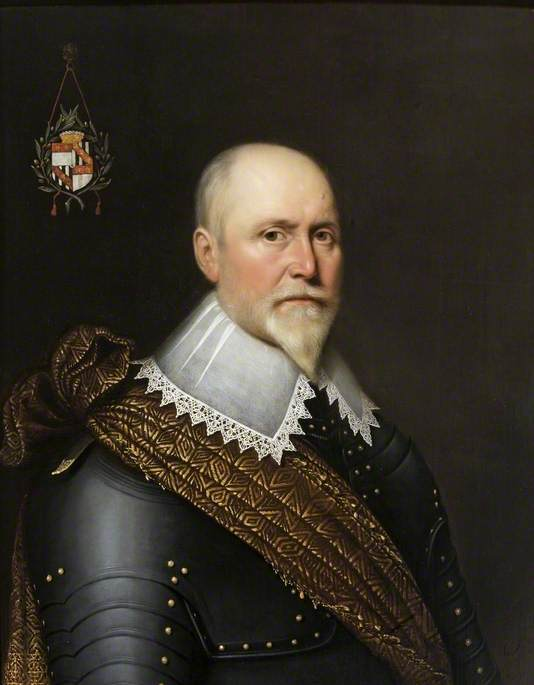
Oliver St John, 1st Viscount Grandison, 1st Baron Tregoz

Viscount Grandison, of Limerick, is a title in the Peerage of Ireland. It was created in 1620 for Sir Oliver St John, the Lord Deputy of Ireland. He was the descendant and namesake of Oliver St John, whose elder brother Sir John St John was the ancestor of the Barons St John of Bletso and the Earls of Bolingbroke. Moreover, St John's nephew Sir John St John, 1st Baronet, of Lydiard Tregoze, was the ancestor of the Viscounts Bolingbroke and the Viscounts St John.

At the time of its creation in 1620, the Grandison viscountcy was given special remainder to the male issue of his niece Barbara Villiers. She was the wife of Sir Edward Villiers, the elder half-brother of George Villiers, 1st Duke of Buckingham, Christopher Villiers, 1st Earl of Anglesey and John Villiers, 1st Viscount Purbeck.

In 1626 the 1st Viscount Grandison was also created Baron Tregoz in the Peerage of England, with normal remainder to the heirs male of his body. On his death in 1630 the barony of Tregoz became extinct as he left no male heirs. He was succeeded in the viscountcy according to the special remainder by William Villiers, the eldest son of Barbara and Sir Edward Villiers. William Villiers, 2nd Viscount Grandison (1614–1643) was a supporter of King Charles I and died of wounds received at the Battle of Bristol in 1643. His daughter the Hon. Barbara Villiers, became the mistress of King Charles II and was created Duchess of Cleveland in 1670.

The second Viscount Grandison had had no sons and was succeeded in the viscountcy by his younger brother, the third Viscount. He died childless and was succeeded by his younger brother, the fourth Viscount. On his death the title passed to his grandson, the fifth Viscount. He was the son of Brigadier-General the Hon. Edward Villiers (died 1693), eldest son of the fourth Viscount. In 1721 the fifth Viscount was created Earl Grandison in the Peerage of Ireland. However, he left no surviving male heirs and the earldom became extinct on his death, while he was succeeded in the Grandison viscountcy by his second cousin William Villiers, 3rd Earl of Jersey, who became the sixth Viscount. Lord Jersey was the great-grandson of Sir Edward Villiers, fifth son of Barbara and Sir Edward Villiers. See the Earl of Jersey for further history of the viscountcy.

In 1746 Elizabeth Mason, daughter of John Villiers, 1st Earl Grandison, was created Viscountess Grandison, and in 1767 she was made Viscountess Villiers and Countess Grandison. All three titles were in the Peerage of Ireland. However, they became extinct on the death of the second Earl in 1800.

== Viscount Grandison, first creation (1620) ==
- Oliver St John, 1st Viscount Grandison (c. 1560–1630)
- William Villiers, 2nd Viscount Grandison (1614–1643)
- John Villiers, 3rd Viscount Grandison (died c. 1661)
- George Villiers, 4th Viscount Grandison (c. 1617–1699) (maternal great-grandfather of Pitt the Elder)
- John Villiers, 5th Viscount Grandison (1692–1766) (created Earl Grandison in 1721)

=== Earl Grandison, first creation (1721) ===
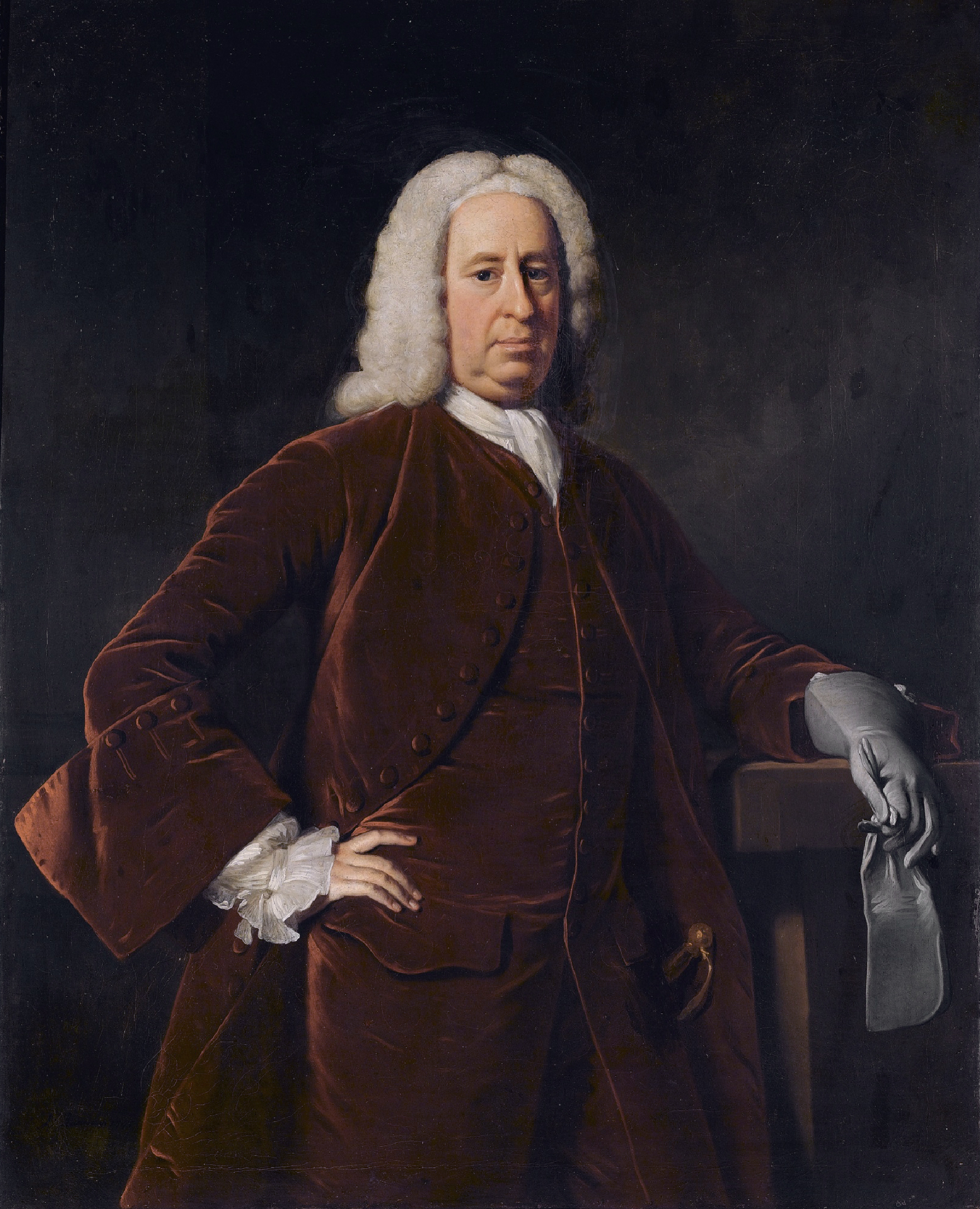
John Fitzgerald Villiers, 1st Earl of Grandison

- John Villiers, 1st Earl Grandison, 5th Viscount Grandison (1692–1766)
  - James Villiers, Lord Villiers (died 1732)
  - William Villiers, Lord Villiers (1715–1739)

=== Viscount Grandison, first creation (1620; reverted) ===
- William Villiers, 3rd Earl of Jersey, 6th Viscount Grandison (died 1769)

See Earl of Jersey for further Viscounts Grandison

=== Earl Grandison, second creation (1767) ===
- Elizabeth Mason, 1st Countess Grandison (died 1782)
- George Mason-Villiers, 2nd Earl Grandison (1751–1800)

== Family tree ==
Villiers (Dukes of Buckingham, 2nd creation), Earl of Jersey, and Earl of Clarendon family tree

Viscount Grandison of Limerick, 1620; Baron Tregoz, 1626	Earl (Countess) of Buckingham (5th creation), 1618
John St. John c. 1552–1594	Oliver St. John c. 1560–1630; 1st Viscount Grandison and Baron Tregoz of Highworth	George Villiers c. 1544–1606	Mary (Beaumont) Villiers c. 1570–1632; Countess of Buckingham
Barony Tregoz extinct, 1630	Earldom for life only, extinct 1632
Viscount Purbeck and Baron Villiers of Stoke, 1619	Viscount Villiers and Baron Whaddon, of Whaddon in the County of Buckingham, 1616; Earl of Buckingham (4th creation), 1617; Marquess of Buckingham (1st creation), 1618; Duke of Buckingham (2nd creation) and Earl of Coventry (1st creation), 1623	Earl of Anglesey (1st creation) and Baron Villiers, 1623
Barbara St John	Edward Villiers c. 1585–1626	John Villiers c. 1591–1658; Viscount Purbeck	George Villiers; 1592–1628; 1st Duke of Buckingham, Marquess of Buckingham, Earl of Buckingham, Earl of Coventry, Viscount Villiers, and Baron Whaddon	Christopher Villiers c. 1593–1630; 1st Earl of Anglesey
Viscountcy of Purbeck extinct, 1658
Baron Hyde of Hindon (1st creation), 1660; Earl of Clarendon (1st creation) and Viscount Cornbury, 1661
William Villiers; 1614–1643; 2nd Viscount Grandison	John Villiers c. 1616–1659; 3rd Viscount Grandison	George Villiers; 1618–1699; 4th Viscount Grandison	Edward Villiers; 1620–1689	George Villiers; 1628–1687; 2nd Duke of Buckingham, Marquess of Buckingham, Earl of Buckingham, Earl of Coventry, Viscount Villiers, and Baron Whaddon	Christopher Villiers d. 1661; 2nd Earl of Anglesey	Edward Hyde; 1609–1674; 1st Earl of Clarendon, Viscount Cornbury, and Baron Hyde
Dukedom of Buckingham (2nd creation) and subsidiary titles extinct, 1687	Viscountcy of Anglesey (1st creation) extinct, 1661
Barbara (Villiers) Palmer; 1640–1709; Duchess of Cleveland, Countess of Castlemaine, Baroness Nonsuch	King Charles II; 1630–1685	King James II; 1633–1701	Anne Hyde; 1637–1671	Henry Hyde; 1638–1709; 2nd Earl of Clarendon, Viscount Cornbury, and Baron Hyde	Laurence Hyde; 1642–1711; 1st Earl of Rochester
Viscount Villiers, 1691; Earl of Jersey, 1697
Edward FitzGerald-Villiers c. 1654–1693	Edward Villiers c. 1656–1711; 1st Earl of Jersey and Viscount Villiers	Queen Mary II; 1662–1694	Queen Anne; 1665–1714	Edward Hyde; 1661–1723; 3rd Earl of Clarendon, Viscount Cornbury, and Baron Hyde	Henry Hyde; 1672–1753; 2nd Earl of Rochester, 4th Earl of Clarendon, Viscount Cornbury, and Baron Hyde
Earldom of Clarendon (1st creation) and subsidiary titles extinct, 1753
Earl Grandison (1st creation), 1721
John Villiers c. 1684–1766; Earl Grandison, 5th Viscount Grandison	William Villiers c. 1682–1721; 2nd Earl of Jersey and Viscount Villiers	Jane Capell; 1694–1724; Countess of Essex
Earldom of Grandison (1st creation) extinct, 1766
Viscount Grandison (2nd creation), 1746; Earl Grandison (2nd creation), 1767	Baron Hyde (2nd creation), 1756; Earl of Clarendon (2nd creation), 1776
Elizabeth Villiers d. 1782; 1st Countess Grandison and Viscountess Grandison	William Villiers d. 1769; 3rd Earl of Jersey and Viscount Villiers, 6th Viscount Grandison	Thomas Villiers; 1709–1786; 1st Earl of Clarendon and Baron Hyde	Charlotte Capell; 1721–1790	Henry Hyde; 1710–1753; 5th Baron Hyde
George Mason-Villiers; 1751–1800; 2nd Earl Grandison and Viscount Grandison	George Bussy Villiers; 1735–1805; 4th Earl of Jersey and Viscount Villiers, 7th Viscount Grandison
Earldom of Grandison (2nd creation) and Viscountcy Grandison (2nd creation) extinct, 1800
George Child Villiers; 1773–1859; 5th Earl of Jersey and Viscount Villiers, 8th Viscount Grandison	Thomas Villiers; 1753–1824; 2nd Earl of Clarendon and Baron Hyde	John Charles Villiers; 1757–1838; 3rd Earl of Clarendon and Baron Hyde	George Villiers; 1759–1827
George Augustus Frederick Child Villiers; 1808–1859; 6th Earl of Jersey and Viscount Villiers, 9th Viscount Grandison	George William Frederick Villiers; 1800–1870; 4th Earl of Clarendon and Baron Hyde
Victor Albert George Child Villiers; 1845–1915; 7th Earl of Jersey and Viscount Villiers, 10th Viscount Grandison	Edward Hyde Villiers; 1846–1914; 5th Earl of Clarendon and Baron Hyde
George Henry Robert Child Villiers; 1873–1923; 8th Earl of Jersey and Viscount Villiers, 11th Viscount Grandison	George Herbert Hyde Villiers; 1877–1955; 6th Earl of Clarendon and Baron Hyde
George Francis Child-Villiers; 1910–1998; 9th Earl of Jersey and Viscount Villiers, 12th Viscount Grandison	George Herbert Arthur Hyde Villiers; 1906–1935 styled Lord Hyde
George Henry Child Villiers; 1948–1998 styled Viscount Villiers	George Frederick "Laurence" Hyde Villiers; 1933–2009; 7th Earl of Clarendon and Baron Hyde
George Francis "William" Child Villiers b. 1976; 10th Earl of Jersey and Viscount Villiers, 13th Viscount Grandison	George Edward Laurence Villiers b. 1976; 8th Earl of Clarendon and Baron Hyde
George Henry William Child Villiers b. 2015 styled Viscount Villiers	Edward George James Villiers b. 2008 styled Lord Hyde
