= Mary & George =

British TV historical drama series

- Promotional poster
- Genre: Historical drama
- Created by: D. C. Moore
- Based on: The King's Assassin by Benjamin Woolley
- Directed by: Oliver Hermanus; Alex Winckler; Florian Cossen
- Starring: Julianne Moore; Nicholas Galitzine; Tony Curran
- Composer: Oliver Coates
- Country of origin: United Kingdom
- Original language: English
- No. of series: 1
- No. of episodes: 7

Production
- Executive producers: Liza Marshall; Oliver Hermanus; Sam Hoyle; D. C. Moore; Julianne Moore
- Production companies: Hera Pictures; Sky Studios

Original release
- Network: Sky Atlantic (UK); Starz (U.S. and Canada)
- Release: 5 March 2024

Mary & George is a British television historical drama series created by D. C. Moore. Based on Benjamin Woolley's book The King's Assassin, it examines the complex romance between James VI and I and George Villiers, 1st Duke of Buckingham. Directed by Oliver Hermanus, Alex Winckler, and Florian Cossen, it also explores the intrigue and power dynamics of 17th-century England, highlighting the personal and political consequences of their affair.

Mary & George premiered on Sky Atlantic in the United Kingdom on 5 March 2024, and aired on Starz in the United States on 5 April.

== Cast and characters ==
=== Main ===
- Julianne Moore as Mary Villiers, Countess of Buckingham
- Nicholas Galitzine as George Villiers, 1st Duke of Buckingham
- Tony Curran as James VI and I
- Laurie Davidson as Robert Carr, 1st Earl of Somerset
- Sean Gilder as Sir Thomas Compton
- Mark O'Halloran as Francis Bacon
- Pearl Chanda as Frances Carr, Countess of Somerset
- Trine Dyrholm as Queen Anne
- Simon Russell Beale as George Villiers
- Niamh Algar as Sandie Brookes
- Adrian Rawlins as Edward Coke
- Samuel Blenkin as Prince Charles
- Amelia Gething as Frances Coke, Viscountess Purbeck
- Nicola Walker as Elizabeth Hatton
- Kate Fleetwood as Cunning Mary
- Mirren Mack as Katherine Villiers, Duchess of Buckingham
- Unax Ugalde as Diego Sarmiento de Acuña, Count of Gondomar
- Joseph Mawle as Sir Walter Raleigh

=== Recurring ===
- Jacob McCarthy as Christopher "Kit" Villiers, 1st Earl of Anglesey
- Tom Victor as John Villiers, 1st Viscount Purbeck
- Alice Grant as Susan Feilding, Countess of Denbigh
- Rina Mahoney as Laura Ashcattle
- Emily Fairn as Jenny
- Lydia Fleming as Anne Turner
- Angus Wright as Sir David Graham

=== Guest ===
- Ankur Bahl as Xander, Mary's bookkeeper
- Khalil Gharbia as Jean, George's tutor in France
- Dimitri Gripari as Vincent, Jean's assistant
- David Weiss as Christian IV of Denmark, the brother-in-law of James I
- Ryan Oliva as Arthur Wearstrap, Graham's henchman
- Matt Barkley as Robert Devereux, 3rd Earl of Essex
- Dylan Brady as Peter Carr, Somerset's cousin
- Jamie Michie as Captain Harrison, a captain under Raleigh's command
- Simon Winkler as Francis Manners, 6th Earl of Rutland
- Cat Simmons as Cassie, a captive freed together with Sandie
- Aine Mcnamara as Maria Anna of Spain, the Spanish Infanta
- Alex Brendemühl as Olivares, the Spanish Chief negotiator and the favourite of the king of Spain.
- Robert Lonsdale as John Felton

== Episodes ==
No.	Title	Directed by	Written by	Original release date
1	"The Second Son"	Oliver Hermanus	D.C. Moore	5 March 2024
In 1612, young master George Villiers lives at home with his mother Mary, siblings, and ailing, abusive father. He half-heartedly attempts suicide after his mother begins strategising a marriage for him, as he is in love with one of the servants, Jenny. During a fight, Mary pushes her husband down the stairs and he subsequently dies. When the family's accountant explains to Mary that her late husband left them no money or estate, she swiftly weds Sir Thomas Compton, particularly to secure funds for George, who is finally sent to France for further education in French, class, and court politics. There, George learns from the local aristocrats how to behave like a royal, and he is able to finally indulge in his same-sex desires. King James visits Sir Thomas and Mary's home, where she meets him, his lover the Earl of Somerset, and his sole English aide Sir David Graham. Mary bonds with Sir David, who dislikes the Scottish and wants to see more English influence at the Palace. George returns from France and Mary organises for him to serve dinner to the king. During service, he is purposefully tripped by a fellow server. George beats the man in the dinner hall, enraging the Earl of Somerset but winning the notice of King James.
2	"The Hunt"	Oliver Hermanus	D.C. Moore	5 March 2024
Mary asks George to cover up his brother John's strangling of one of the servant's pet dogs, but he is not convincing. Mary and George continue vying for King James' attentions while also strategising a bride for John with the daughter of Sir Edward Coke, Frances, both to little success. Mary devises a plan with Sir David and Queen Anne, who despise the Earl of Somerset, to bring George front and centre at the king's court. Though George is knighted and joins the king's favoured men, the Earl of Somerset senses the plans to oust him and warns George to be wary. Mary begins visiting a local prostitute, Sandie, with a secret past. On a hunt with the king and his men, George is pushed off his horse by the Earl of Somerset but survives, rescued by King James. At the end of the hunt, the king excuses the Earl of Somerset and has George kill the wounded stag. That night, George and King James consummate their relationship. Mary and Sandie poison and kill Sir David, who had learned of Mary's forged identity.
3	"Not So Much by Love as by Awe"	Oliver Hermanus	D.C. Moore	5 March 2024
At her first day at court, Mary attempts to confront King James about George's continued mistreatment by the bedchamber, but she causes a scene and is excused. Queen Anne confronts Mary about the Earl of Somerset's unwavering presence, now a two-fold nuisance due to his detestable wife. George is approached by Sir Francis Bacon, who seeks an allyship. After meeting with the Earl of Essex, the "cursed" ex-husband of Countess Somerset, Mary learns of a murder plot against Thomas Overbury enacted by the Somersets and passes the evidence on to Sir Edward. George attempts to stand up for himself but is struck by smallpox. Mary's lover Sandie stays close and continues assisting her schemes. In the midst of the investigation into the murder plot, the Earl of Somerset visits an ailing George and professes his love in attempt to bargain for a pardon. The two have sex with George afterwards revealing he hopes to see the Earl hang. The Somersets are found guilty and sentenced to death, and the king apologises to Mary for not taking her previous concerns seriously. George and King James are reunited.
4	"The Wolf and the Lamb"	Alex Winckler	D.C. Moore	5 March 2024
1617. After a night together, George sustains a brutal bite on his arm from King James, whose mood swings continue. In yet more bizarre behaviour, John, who cannot swim, walks into a lake and nearly drowns. King James travels with his men to Edinburgh and appoints Sir Francis as Keeper of the Seal in his absence. In a bid to secure marriage between John and Frances, still aggressively rejected by Lady Hatton, Mary and Sir Edward have Frances kidnapped by Sandie. At Sir Thomas and Mary's manor, Sandie witnesses John repeatedly stab Jenny, disturbing her. George's new lover Peter Carr, cousin of the Earl of Somerset, continues to cause a rift between him and the king. When the king dismisses George, he and Peter visit the remote Ruthven Castle, where Peter tells George of the king's first love, the late Lord Lennox. During an attempt to trap and murder George as revenge for the downfall of the Somersets, Peter is shot and killed by Kit. King James and George reconcile. The king reveals the true purpose of the trip north was to retrieve Lord Lennox's embalmed heart, and the two bury it in a new secret location. A spiraling John and miserably unhappy Frances are ultimately wed, and Mary promises to next find George a wife.
5	"The Golden City"	Alex Winckler	D.C. Moore & Stacey Gregg	5 March 2024
As Mary gains more power, her marriage with Sir Thomas breaks down. Diego, Count of Gondomar, arrives to tell King James of an attack by the English, led by Sir Walter Raleigh, on the Spanish in Guiana, defying a standing peace treaty. George, inserting himself into the king's political affairs, is invited to sit on the Privy Council but oversteps his bounds in its meeting with Raleigh, naively believing his sympathetic tales of war and gold in search of El Dorado. With Queen Anne ill, Prince Charles' bitterness compounds. Sir Francis reveals to George that Mary and Sandie murdered Sir David. As King James attempts to juggle his people's favour and peace with Spain, the public turn against him for not hailing Raleigh as a national hero. Sir Francis and Diego prove to George that Raleigh is a warmonger keen on conflict between England and Spain, hoping George can influence the king to stop him. Mary attempts to arrange marriage between George and the wealthy Katherine, and, though he initially refuses, confident in a long-standing relationship with the king, Katherine convinces him she won't stand in his way and the two sleep together. Sandie assists Frances, who has been having an affair, in an abortion and confronts Mary about refusing to admit to John's madness. John is put in an asylum. George comes face to face with the harsh realities of his influence when King James orders Raleigh to be executed. Mary realises she is losing hold on her power over George.
6	"The Queen Is Dead"	Florian Cossen	D.C. Moore & Anchuli Felicia King	5 March 2024
Following Raleigh's execution, the English revolt. Queen Anne dies, but the Palace is too debt-ridden to afford her state funeral. George empathises with the bitter, grieving Prince Charles, and the two work to bring the king out of his self-indulgence and recognise the grave issues at hand. King James finally agrees to open Parliament for the first time in six years to argue for higher taxes and continued peace with Spain. Sandie, who had warned Mary of Sir Francis' scheming, is jailed for Sir David's murder. The king mourns Queen Anne but admits he did not love her and cannot be sure of George's continued declarations of love for him, as love is fickle. Sir Edward resigns from the Privy Council to lead Parliamentary committees into the Spanish threat and domestic corruption. Mary begs him for Sandie's release, but he vows to see Sandie hang as revenge for Frances' suffering. King James retreats back into his indulgences amidst the political chaos. Sir Edward seeks to arrest George and Kit on behalf of his committees, so the two flee to Mary for advice and she agrees to help them in exchange for a pardon for Sandie. To avoid going down with the lot, George convinces Diego to help him frame Sir Francis for treason; in exchange, George will try to arrange prospects between Prince Charles and the Spanish infanta, to secure peace. Kit murders Sir Francis' greatest ally, Wearstrap. Katherine gives birth to a daughter. Sir Francis Bacon is found guilty of treason, stripped of all titles and banished. Believing Mary was at the heart of his betrayal, he has Sandie murdered with George's permission.
7	"War"	Florian Cossen	D.C. Moore & Laura Grace	5 March 2024
When Mary tracks down Sir Francis in order to avenge Sandie, he reveals George gave his blessing to the killing. In Spain, Prince Charles is presented before the infanta and George philanders. Following setbacks, George ultimately fails to bribe Spain's Chief Negotiator in securing further marriage talks and, humiliated, vows revenge. On doctor's orders, King James travels to the countryside to rest. Mary strategically joins him, appealing to his loneliness. George and Prince Charles return from Spain. Though the king is initially disappointed and dismissive of them both, George brings him to the forest and they make love. Once again a united front, George influences King James to allow him to address Parliament in order to toughen up on Spanish relations. There, with Sir Edward's support, he encourages full-blown war. King James, who is committed to peace, is shocked to hear of George's betrayal from Mary and sets fire to the forest. When George arrives, the king deems their love affair an old fool's lust, strips George of his titles, and sentences George to hang for treason to both George's and Mary's shock. He then collapses, and George and Mary return him to the countryside estate, where George smothers him to death so he may not relay his orders to Prince Charles. Over the next few years, Charles is crowned and Katherine gives birth to a son. In 1628, while at war with France, George is stabbed to death by John Felton, who is embittered by his disregard for human life.

== Production ==
Mary & George is a seven-part limited historical drama series created by D. C. Moore, with Oliver Hermanus serving as the lead director. Both Moore and Hermanus are executive producers, alongside Liza Marshall for Hera Pictures and Sam Hoyle for Sky Studios.

In October 2022, it was announced that Julianne Moore would lead the series, portraying Mary Villiers, Countess of Buckingham. Nicholas Galitzine joined the cast in January 2023, playing her son, George Villiers, 1st Duke of Buckingham. Additional cast members were revealed in March 2023.

Principal photography began in England in January 2023, starting in London. Notable filming locations included Broughton Castle in Oxfordshire (April 2023),Knole in Kent, which was shut down for filming in late January and early February, and Ham House in Richmond, used to represent a London palace from 22 to 26 May 2023. Additionally, filming took place at Old Hunstanton Beach in Norfolk in early June 2023.

=== Title sequence ===
The title sequence was created by Peter Anderson Studio, based in London. It features scenes from the drama depicted as Jacobean-era oil paintings, alongside period artworks, including Artemisia Gentileschi's 1613 painting "Judith Slaying Holofernes," Frans Snyders' 1614 painting "Still Life with Dead Game, Fruits, and Vegetables," and Jean-Baptiste Oudry's 1723 painting "Hjortjakt." The images are overlaid with a typographical mask, designed as a portal to engage the audience and provide glimpses into a world filled with secrets and covert actions. Peter Anderson Studio describes the sequence as "a peephole into the souls of those who vie for power within the darkened courts of history."

The title sequence was described as "visually and musically stunning" by a review in Collider.

== Release ==
Mary & George was presented at the MIPCOM in Cannes, with NBCUniversal Global Distribution managing international rights on behalf of Sky. The series premiered on Sky Atlantic in the United Kingdom, and also aired in Ireland, Germany, and Italy. In the United States and Canada, it was released by Starz. Initially, AMC Networks was set to distribute the series in the United States, Canada, Australia, New Zealand, and India, but they later dropped the project. Foxtel picked up the series for streaming in Australia, with availability starting on 6 March 2024.

In May 2023, first-look images of Mary & George were published in Vogue magazine. During the Edinburgh Television Festival in August, Meghan Lyvers, Director of Original Drama at Sky Studios, announced that the series was expected to be released "in the coming year."

The initial trailer for the series debuted on 16 November 2023, followed by the release of the official trailer on 1 February 2024, with the series confirmed to premiere on 5 March 2024 on Sky Atlantic.

== Reception ==
On Rotten Tomatoes, 96% of 49 reviews for Mary & George are positive, with an average rating of 7.3/10. The website's critics' consensus reads: "Bawdy, irreverent, and ruled by Julianne Moore in top form, Mary & George is a regal treat for fans of frothy court intrigue." This sentiment was echoed by The Guardian's Joel Golby, who awarded the miniseries 5 stars, calling it "a wickedly lewd delight" that feels "fresh and new and interesting." On Metacritic, the series holds a weighted average score of 73 out of 100 based on 22 critics, indicating "generally favorable reviews".
