= Earl of Buckingham =

Title of English peerage

Earl of Buckingham is a peerage title created several times in the Peerage of England. It is not to be confused with the title of Earl of Buckinghamshire.

It was first created in 1097 for Walter Giffard, but became extinct in 1164 with the death of the second earl. It may have been created again in 1164 for Richard de Clare ("Strongbow"), who died without issue in 1176. It was created again in 1377 for Thomas of Woodstock, the youngest son of King Edward III. He was created Duke of Gloucester in 1385. The dukedom was forfeit on his attainder in 1397, but the earldom passed to his son, Humphrey, but became extinct on his death two years later. The title was created for a fourth time in 1617 for George Villiers, 1st Viscount Villiers, who was subsequently created Duke of Buckingham in 1623. When he was elevated to Marquess of Buckingham in 1618, the earldom was created a fifth time for his mother, Mary Villiers for her life only. All titles became extinct on the death of the second duke in 1687.

== Earls of Buckingham (1097), first creation ==
- Walter Giffard, 1st Earl of Buckingham (d. 1102)
- Walter Giffard, 2nd Earl of Buckingham (d. 1164)

== Earls of Buckingham (1164), second creation ==
- Richard de Clare, 1st Earl of Buckingham (c. 1130–1176)

== Earls of Buckingham (1377), third creation ==
- Thomas of Woodstock, 1st Earl of Buckingham (1355–1397)
- Humphrey, 2nd Earl of Buckingham (1381–1399)

== Earls of Buckingham (1617), fourth creation ==
- see Duke of Buckingham, second creation

== Countesses of Buckingham (1618), fifth creation ==
- Mary Villiers, Countess of Buckingham (1570–1632)

== Family tree of the fourth and fifth creations ==
Villiers (Dukes of Buckingham, 2nd creation) family tree

Earl (Countess) of Buckingham (5th creation), 1618
George Villiers c. 1544–1606	Mary Villiers c. 1570–1632; Countess of Buckingham
See St John family tree
Viscount Purbeck and Baron Villiers of Stoke, 1619	Viscount Villiers and Baron Whaddon, of Whaddon in the County of Buckingham, 1616; Earl of Buckingham (4th creation), 1617; Marquess of Buckingham (1st creation), 1618; Duke of Buckingham (2nd creation) and Earl of Coventry (1st creation), 1623	Earl of Anglesey (1st creation) and Baron Villiers, 1623
Barbara St John	Edward Villiers c. 1585–1626	John Villiers c. 1591–1658; Viscount Purbeck	George Villiers; 1592–1628; 1st Duke of Buckingham, Marquess of Buckingham, Earl of Buckingham, Earl of Coventry, Viscount Villiers, and Baron Whaddon	Christopher Villiers c. 1593–1630; 1st Earl of Anglesey
Viscountcy of Purbeck extinct, 1658
William Villiers; 1614–1643; 2nd Viscount Grandison	John Villiers c. 1616–1659; 3rd Viscount Grandison	George Villiers; 1618–1699; 4th Viscount Grandison	Edward Villiers; 1620–1689	George Villiers; 1628–1687; 2nd Duke of Buckingham, Marquess of Buckingham, Earl of Buckingham, Earl of Coventry, Viscount Villiers, and Baron Whaddon	Christopher Villiers d. 1661; 2nd Earl of Anglesey
Dukedom of Buckingham (2nd creation) and subsidiary titles extinct, 1687	Viscountcy of Anglesey (1st creation) extinct, 1661
Viscount Villiers, 1691; Earl of Jersey, 1697
Barbara Palmer; 1640–1709; Duchess of Cleveland, Countess of Castlemaine, Baroness Nonsuch	King Charles II; 1630–1685	Edward FitzGerald-Villiers c. 1654–1693	Edward Villiers c. 1656–1711; 1st Earl of Jersey and Viscount Villiers
Earl Grandison, 1721
John Villiers c. 1684–1766; Earl Grandison, 5th Viscount Grandison	William Villiers c. 1682–1721; 2nd Earl of Jersey and Viscount Villiers
Earldom of Grandison extinct, 1766
William Villiers d. 1769; 3rd Earl of Jersey and Viscount Villiers, 6th Viscount Grandison
George Bussy Villiers; 1735–1805; 4th Earl of Jersey and Viscount Villiers, 7th Viscount Grandison
George Child Villiers; 1773–1859; 5th Earl of Jersey and Viscount Villiers, 8th Viscount Grandison
George Augustus Frederick Child Villiers; 1808–1859; 6th Earl of Jersey and Viscount Villiers, 9th Viscount Grandison
Victor Albert George Child Villiers; 1845–1915; 7th Earl of Jersey and Viscount Villiers, 10th Viscount Grandison
George Henry Robert Child Villiers; 1873–1923; 8th Earl of Jersey and Viscount Villiers, 11th Viscount Grandison
George Francis Child-Villiers; 1910–1998; 9th Earl of Jersey and Viscount Villiers, 12th Viscount Grandison
George Henry Child Villiers; 1948–1998 styled Viscount Villiers
George Francis William Child Villiers b. 1976; 10th Earl of Jersey and Viscount Villiers, 13th Viscount Grandison
George Henry William Child Villiers b. 2015 styled Viscount Villiers

== Impostor ==
From 1997 to 2006, Charles Stopford claimed to be the Earl of Buckingham.
