= 2nd Earl of Rochester =

2nd Earl of Rochester can refer to:

- John Wilmot, 2nd Earl of Rochester (1647 – 1680), English Libertine poet
- Henry Hyde, 4th Earl of Clarendon and 2nd Earl of Rochester (1672 – 1753), English nobleman and politician

See also

- Earl of Rochester
