= Nicholas St. John =

Nicholas St. John may refer to:

- Nicholas St. John (politician)
- Nicholas St. John (screenwriter)
