= Villiers baronets =

Extinct baronetcy in the Baronetage of England

Villiers Baronets, of Brooksby
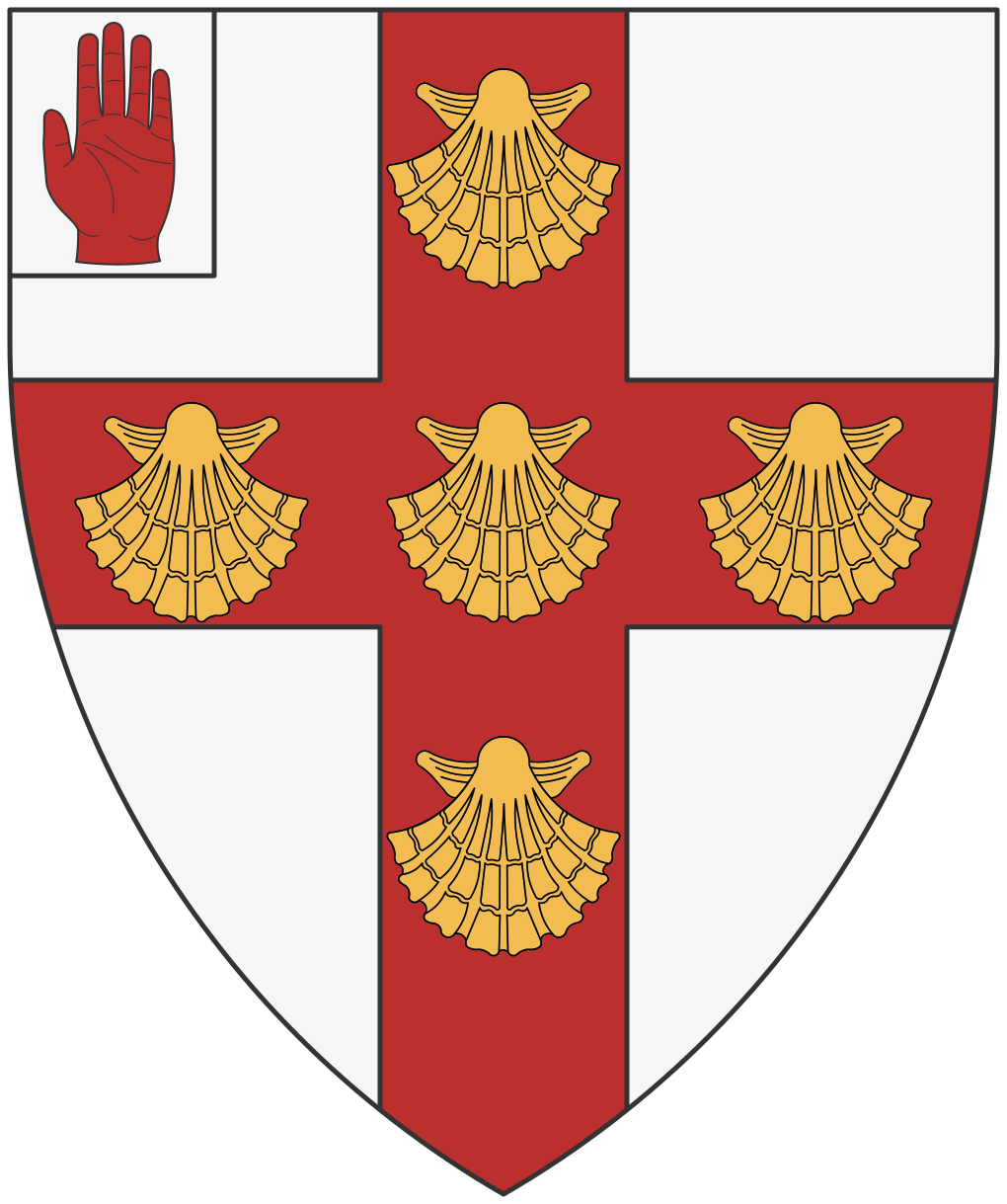
- Arms of Villiers of Brooksby
- Arms: Argent on a Cross Gules five Escallops Or

The Villiers Baronetcy, of Brooksby, in the County of Leicester was created in the baronetage of England on 19 July 1619 for William Villiers of Brokesby, Leicestershire. A member of the prominent Villiers family, he was the son of George Villiers (of Brokesby), brother of Sir Edward Villiers, (grandfather of Edward Villiers, 1st Earl of Jersey), and the half-brother of George Villiers, 1st Duke of Buckingham, Christopher Villiers, 1st Earl of Anglesey, and John Villiers, Viscount Purbeck. He was high sheriff of Leicestershire in 1609. The third baronet sat as member of parliament for Leicester from 1698 to 1701. On his death in 1712 the title became extinct.

== Villiers baronets, of Brooksby (1619) ==
- Sir William Villiers, 1st Baronet (c. 1575–1629)
- Sir George Villiers, 2nd Baronet (1620–1682)
- Sir William Villiers, 3rd Baronet (1645–1712)

== See also ==
- Earl of Jersey
- Duke of Buckingham (1623 creation)
- Earl of Anglesey (1623 creation)
- Viscount Purbeck
- Earl of Clarendon (1776 creation)
