= Henry Washington (Royalist) =

Colonel Henry Washington
- Born: March 1615
- Died: March 1664 (aged 48–49)
- Resting place: Richmond, Surrey
- Occupations: Royalist (Cavalier), officer
- Spouse(s): Elizabeth, daughter of Sir John Pakington, 1st Baronet
- Children: four daughters

Colonel Henry Washington (March 1615 – March 1664) was an officer in the Royalist army during the English Civil War.

== Biography ==
Henry Washington, baptized 21 March 1615, was the son of Sir William Washington and Anne, daughter of Sir George Villiers (c. 1550–1605).

Col. Henry Washington fought in the English Civil War as a royalist. He served as lieutenant colonel under Col Ussher until succeeding upon Ussher's death in Litchfield, April 1643. On July 26, 1643, in the important shipping port of Bristol, just outside of London, Col. Washington and a small group were stationed along the city's barricade between Royal Fort and Brandon Hill. Working in conjunction with Prince Rupert, the barricade through a church and Fort was stormed that allowed royalist troops to enter the neutral city. This went down in history as the infamous "Washington Breach." Bristol officials and citizens had attempted a position of neutrality and in that effort had built barricades and trenches around their perimeter to deter invasion. To commemorate the Washington's Breach and in honor of his relationship to the 1st United States president, a brass plaque was installed at the site in 1931, by the Bristol Branch of the Geographical Association.

Col. Henry Washington served as governor of the city of Worcester in 1645, refusing to surrender to the Scots.

Col Henry Washington died in March 1664 and was buried at St. Mary Magdalene Churchyard, Richmond, London Borough of Richmond upon Thames, Greater London, England.

== Family ==
Henry was born in England to Sir William Washington, knight, and Anne, daughter of George and Audrey Villiers.

Henry Washington married Elizabeth, daughter of Sir John Pakington, 1st Baronet. They had four daughters: Mary (died 1681), Catherine (Washington) Forster, Penelope, and one other. His widow, Elizabeth remarried to Col. Samuel Sandys of Ombersley, a close friend of Prince Rupert.

As the grandson of Lawrence Washington of Sulgrave, Henry shared an ancestor with the 1st President of the United States, George Washington.
