= Benjamin Woolley =

British historian

Benjamin Woolley is an author, media journalist and television presenter.

In 2018, he published The King's Assassin, about the affair between James VI and I and George Villiers, 1st Duke of Buckingham. In its review, Kirkus reviews considered it a "perfect choice for readers who love English history, especially the Stuart period." In 2024, it formed the basis for Mary & George, a British historical drama miniseries created by D. C. Moore starring Julianne Moore.

== Biography ==
Woolley studied philosophy and politics at Durham University, graduating in 1979. Woolley currently teaches English literature at Goldsmiths, University of London.

== Books ==
- Woolley, Benjamin (17 July 2018). The King's Assassin: The Secret Plot to Murder King James I. St. Martin's Publishing Group. ISBN 978-1-250-12505-7.
- Woolley, Benjamin (2007). Savage Kingdom: The True Story of Jamestown, 1607, and the Settlement of America (1st ed.). New York: HarperCollins. ISBN 978-0-06-009056-2. OCLC 122571096. LCC F234.J3 W66 2007.
- Woolley, Benjamin (2005) [2004]. The Herbalist: Nicholas Culpeper and the Fight for Medical Freedom. London: Harper Perennial. ISBN 978-0-00-712658-3. OCLC 61476864. LCC RS164.C89 W635 2004. (about Nicholas Culpeper)
- Woolley, Benjamin (2001). The Queen's Conjuror: The Life and Magic of Dr. Dee, Adviser to Queen Elizabeth I (1st ed.). New York: Henry Holt. ISBN 978-0-8050-6509-1. OCLC 45376415. (about John Dee)
- Woolley, Benjamin (2002) [1999]. The Bride of Science: Romance, Reason, and Byron's Daughter. New York : London: McGraw-Hill. ISBN 978-0-07-138860-3. OCLC 59421218. (about Ada Lovelace)
- Woolley, Benjamin (1993) [1992]. Virtual Worlds: A Journey in Hype and Hyperreality. London: Penguin. ISBN 978-0-14-015439-9. OCLC 475636749. LCC BD331 .W866 1992.

== TV programmes ==
Woolley presented Games Britannia, a documentary on the painting An Experiment on a Bird in the Air Pump for BBC Four, and an episode of The Late Show, Libraries and Civilization. Together with Martyn Ives, David H. Levy, and David Taylor, Woolley won a 1998 News & Documentary Emmy Award in the "Individual Achievement in a Craft, Writer" category for the script of the documentary 3 Minutes to Impact produced by York Films for the Discovery Channel.
