= Child Villiers =

Child Villiers is the surname of a British aristocratic family (Child was added to the Villiers name by the 5th Earl by royal licence in 1819).

Persons bearing this name include:

- George Child Villiers, 5th Earl of Jersey (1773–1859), British courtier and politician; son of George Villiers, 4th Earl of Jersey
  - Sarah Sophia Child Villiers, Countess of Jersey (1785–1867), wife of the 5th earl
  - Francis Child Villiers (1819–1862), British politician, son of the 5th earl
- George Child Villiers, 6th Earl of Jersey (1808–1859)
- Victor Child Villiers, 7th Earl of Jersey (1845–1915), British banker, politician and Governor of New South Wales
- George Child Villiers, 8th Earl of Jersey (1873–1923), British politician
- George Child Villiers, 9th Earl of Jersey (1910–1998)
  - Virginia Child Villiers, Countess of Jersey (1908–1996), American actress who married the 9th earl and became Virginia Child Villiers, Countess of Jersey
  - George Child Villiers, Viscount Villiers (1948–1998), son of the 9th earl
- William Child Villiers, 10th Earl of Jersey (born 1976), British producer, actor and writer
  - Amelie Child Villiers, actress and daughter of the 10th earl

== See also ==
- Villiers family
