= Baron Villiers =

There have been three Barons Villiers in the Peerage of England:

- Baron Villiers of Stoke, created in 1619 for the Viscount Purbeck
- Baron Villiers of Daventry, created in 1623 for the Earl of Anglesey
- Baron Villiers of Hoo, created in 1691 for the Viscount Villiers (later Earl of Jersey)
