= Amelie Child Villiers =

British actress

- Other name: Amelie Child-Villiers
- Education: Beaulieu Convent School
- Occupation: Actress
- Years active: 2021–present
- Father: William Child Villiers, 10th Earl of Jersey

Lady Amelie Natasha Sophia Child Villiers is a Jersey actress.

== Early and personal life ==
From Jersey, she is a member of the Child Villiers aristocratic family and the daughter of William Child Villiers, 10th Earl of Jersey and Marianne, Countess of Jersey (née de Guelle). She has sisters Mia and Evangeline, and a brother George.

Child Villiers attended St Michaels Preparatory School, Beaulieu Convent School and Hautlieu School in Jersey.

== Career ==
As a child actress, Child Villiers made her feature film debut in Prano Bailey-Bond's 2021 horror film Censor as young Nina (played by Sophia La Porta as an adult). At age 11 in 2020, Child Villiers filmed scenes for an episode the Amazon Prime series The Lord of the Rings: The Rings of Power, a prequel to the literary work of J.R.R Tolkien, as Young Galadriel (played by Morfydd Clark as an adult). The series premiered in 2022, marking Child Villiers' television debut. She also had a role as Tatiana in the 2023 American comedy action film The Machine.

Child Villiers played the younger version of Rebecca Ferguson's lead character Juliette Nichols in the Apple TV+ science fiction epic series adaptation of Silo. In 2025, she was cast as Beatrice Baddingham alongside David Tennant in the second season of the Disney+ adaptation of Jilly Cooper's Rivals.

== Filmography ==
Year	Title	Role	Notes
2021	Censor	Young Nina	
2022	The Lord of the Rings: The Rings of Power	Young Galadriel	Episode: "A Shadow of the Past"
2023	The Machine	Tatiana	As Amelie Villiers
2023–2024	Silo	Young Juliette	4 episodes
2026	Rivals	Beatrice Baddingham	Series 2
