= George Mason-Villiers, 2nd Earl Grandison =

British peer and politician

George Mason-Villiers, 2nd Earl Grandison PC (13 July 1751 – 14 July 1800), styled Viscount Villiers between 1767 and 1782, was a British peer from the Villiers family and politician who sat in the House of Commons from 1774 to 1780.

== Early life ==
Born George Mason, he was the son of Aland John Mason and his wife Lady Elizabeth Villiers, daughter of John Villiers, 1st Earl Grandison. His father who represented County Waterford in the Irish House of Commons died in March 1759 and his mother re-married to Major-General Charles Montague Halifax in 1763. He was educated at Eton College from 1762 to 1766. In 1767 his mother was created Countess Grandison. He took name of Villiers on 21 October 1771 and married Lady Gertrude, daughter of Francis Seymour-Conway, 1st Marquess of Hertford on 10 February 1772.

== Political career ==
In 1774 Villers was returned as Member of Parliament for Ludlow. Towards the end of the parliament he went abroad with his family, presumably to Switzerland where his mother lived and declined to stand in 1780. In 1782 he succeeded his mother in the earldom. This was an Irish peerage and gave him a seat in the Irish House of Lords but not in the English House of Lords. Three years later he was sworn of the Irish Privy Council.

== Later life and legacy ==
Lord Grandison and his wife Gertrude Seymour Conway, who he had married in 1772, had one daughter Lady Gertrude Amelia Mason-Villiers. His wife died in Switzerland in September 1793, aged 42. Lord Grandison survived her by seven years and died in July 1800, aged 49. As he had no sons the earldom died with him. His daughter and heiress married Lord Henry Stuart. Their children included Henry Villiers-Stuart, 1st Baron Stuart de Decies, and William Villiers-Stuart.

Parliament of Great Britain
Preceded by William Fellowes; Thomas Herbert	Member of Parliament for Ludlow; 1774–1780; With: The Lord Clive	Succeeded by The Lord Clive; Frederick Cornewall
Peerage of Ireland
Preceded by Elizabeth Mason	Earl Grandison; 1782–1800	Extinct
