= James FitzGerald-Villiers =

James FitzGerald-Villiers (1708 – 12 December 1732), styled Lord Villiers from 1721, was an Anglo-Irish politician from the Villiers family.

FitzGerald-Villiers was the eldest son of John Villiers, 1st Earl Grandison, and Frances Cary. He was the Member of Parliament for County Waterford in the Irish House of Commons between 1730 and his death in 1732. FitzGerald-Villiers married Jane Butler, daughter of Richard Butler, on 10 July 1728 but they had no issue. Both he and his younger brother predeceased their father, meaning that John Villiers's earldom became extinct upon his death in 1766.

Parliament of Ireland
Preceded by Edward May; Sir John Osborne, Bt	Member of Parliament for County Waterford; 1730–1732; With: Sir John Osborne, Bt	Succeeded by James May; Sir John Osborne, Bt
