= Nicholas St. John (politician) =

16th-century English politician

Personal details
- Born: 1526
- Died: 8 November 1589 (aged 62–63)
- Spouse: Elizabeth Blount
- Children: 8, including Oliver St John, 1st Viscount Grandison
- Parent: John St John (father)

Nicholas St. John (by 1526 – 8 November 1589) was an English politician.

== Biography ==
Nicholas was the eldest son of Sir John St John of Lydiard Park, Lydiard Tregoze, Wiltshire, he succeeded his father in 1576.

He was a Gentleman pensioner by 1552 to 1560. He sat on the Wiltshire bench as a justice of the peace from c. 1574 and was appointed High Sheriff of Wiltshire for 1579–80. He was a member (MP) of the Parliament of England for Camelford in March 1553, Saltash in 1555, Cricklade in 1563, Great Bedwyn in 1571 and Marlborough in 1572.

He married Elizabeth, the daughter of Sir Richard Blount of Mapledurham, Oxfordshire, with whom he had 3 sons and 5 daughters. He was succeeded by his eldest son, John. His second son, Oliver, was made Lord Deputy of Ireland and Viscount Grandison. His eldest daughter Elizabeth married Richard St George.
