= Laurence Villiers, 7th Earl of Clarendon =

British peer

George Frederick Laurence Hyde Villiers, 7th Earl of Clarendon (2 February 1933 – 4 July 2009), styled Lord Hyde between 1935 and 1955, was a British peer from the Villiers family.

Villiers was the son of George Herbert Arthur Hyde Villiers, Lord Hyde (1906–1935) and the Honourable Marion Feodorovna Louise Glyn (1900–1970). He succeeded in the earldom on the death of his grandfather in 1955.

== Family ==
Lord Clarendon married Jane Diana Dawson in 1974. They had two children:

- George Edward Laurence Villiers, 8th Earl of Clarendon (born 1976)
- Lady Sarah Katherine Jane Villiers (born 1977)

Court offices
Preceded by None due to World War II (prev. Robert Eliot)	Page of Honour; 1948–1950	Succeeded by Hon. Charles Wilson
Peerage of Great Britain
Preceded by George Herbert Hyde Villiers	Earl of Clarendon; 1955–2009	Succeeded by George Edward Laurence Villiers
