= Mary Villiers, Countess of Buckingham =

English peeress and mother of George Villiers (1570–1632)

Mary Villiers
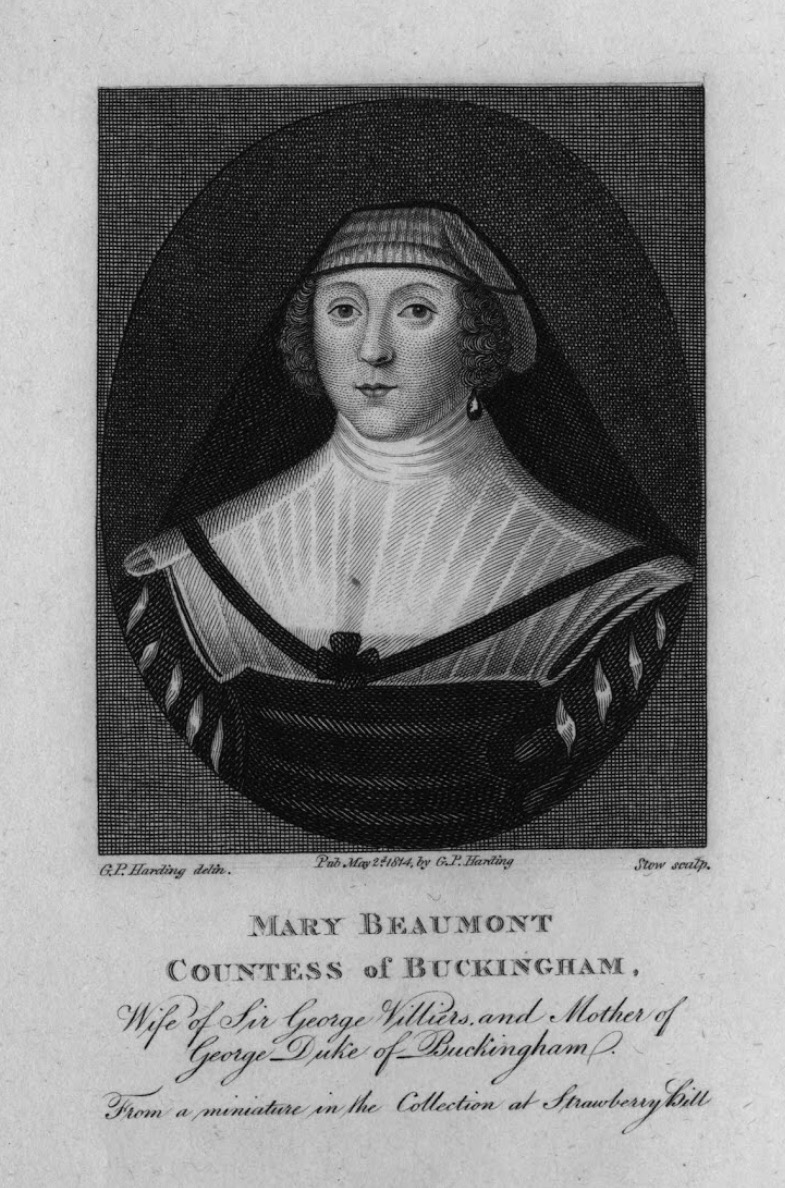

Countess of Buckingham (suo jure)
- Tenure: 1 July 1618 – 19 April 1632
- Predecessor: Humphrey (1399)
- Born: Mary Beaumont c. 1570
- Died: 19 April 1632
- Noble family: Beaumont
- Spouses: Sir George Villiers; Sir William Rayner; Sir Thomas Compton
- Issue: Susan Feilding, Countess of Denbigh; John Villiers, 1st Viscount Purbeck; George Villiers, 1st Duke of Buckingham; Christopher Villiers, 1st Earl of Anglesey
- Father: Anthony Beaumont
- Mother: Anne Armstrong

Mary Villiers, Countess of Buckingham (née Beaumont; c. 1570 – 19 April 1632) was an English peeress. She is perhaps best known as the mother of the royal favourite George Villiers, 1st Duke of Buckingham.

== Family ==
Mary Beaumont was the daughter of Anthony Beaumont of Glenfield, Leicestershire, a direct descendant of Henry de Beaumont, and his wife Anne Armstrong, daughter of Thomas Armstrong of Corby.

After his first wife Audrey Saunders died on 1 May 1587, she became the second wife of Sir George Villiers, who was her cousin through his mother Colette, widow of Richard Beaumont. They had four children:

- Susan (1583–1652), married William Feilding, 1st Earl of Denbigh.
- John (c. 1590–1658), later created Viscount Purbeck.
- George (1592–1628), later created Duke of Buckingham.
- Christopher (c. 1593–1630), later created Earl of Anglesey.

Following the death of her first husband she made two further marriages, in 1606 to Sir William Rayner of Orton, Peterborough and in 1609 to Sir Thomas Compton, a younger son of Henry Compton, 1st Baron Compton. In 1618 she was created Countess of Buckingham in her own right. She became a Roman Catholic convert in the early 1620s, under the influence of the Jesuit John Percy.

== Mother of the royal favourite ==
Mary seems to have been the first person to recognise that George, her second son, had the ability to become a figure of political importance. Although she was said to have been penniless when she married his father, she somehow found the money to send him to the French court, where he learned the courtly skills, including fencing and dancing, and gained some fluency in the French language. Having found the funds to fit him out with a suitable wardrobe, she then sent him to the English Court, where he rapidly became the new favourite of King James I.

As George rose, his mother, brothers and half-brothers rose with him: the King in 1618 said that he lived to no other end but to advance the Villiers family. Mary arranged George's marriage to the great heiress Katherine, Baroness de Ros, who was said to be the richest woman in England. Her enemies said that she had entrapped Katherine into the marriage by arranging for her to spend the night under the same roof as George, thus tarnishing her reputation and leaving her family with no choice but to accept George's proposal.

In July 1619, Frances Coke, Viscountess Purbeck was appointed keeper of Somerset House in London for Prince Charles, and Mary Villiers, Countess of Buckingham, frequently stayed there, or at Erith. In September 1622, she left court for her house at Dalby in Leicestershire (bought from Sir Edward Noel in 1617). In May 1623, she was at Goadby Marwood, with Viscount Purbeck, and wrote to the Earl of Middlesex with congratulations on the birth of his daughter Frances Cranfield. The Countess of Buckingham was often at court, and rode hunting on horseback with King James and her daughter, the Countess of Denbigh, on 19 June 1624 (the King's birthday) from Wanstead House. When King James was on his deathbed at Theobalds she arranged for his treatment with a plaster applied to his wrists. This angered the physician John Craig who rebuked her. For his speeches to the Countess, Craig was ordered to leave court.

She lent £50 to the playwright Elizabeth Cary, Viscountess Falkland in 1627. When the Duke of Buckingham was assassinated in 1628, it was said that she reacted to the news without any sign of surprise, as though it was something she had long expected. Whatever her private feelings may have been, she behaved outwardly after his death in a manner which struck most people as cold and unfeeling. She died four years later and was buried in Westminster Abbey.

She was a woman of formidable strength of character, but she was never popular, due to what was described as her relentless ambition and greed. She had been beautiful when young, but her manners struck the Court as loud and tactless.

James Stow engraved a drawing of her by George Perfect Harding in 1814.

== Popular culture ==
Later 17th-century works, including Roger Coke's Detection of the court and state of England (London, 1697) narrate that Mary Villiers was first a servant in the kitchen of George Villiers and became his wife's maid. According to Coke, when King James was at Newmarket Palace in 1615, she was able to place her son George to advantage in a play at Cambridge called Ignoramus, which the King saw and so her son's career was launched.

In 2024, Mary Villiers is played by Julianne Moore in Mary & George, a British historical drama miniseries created by D. C. Moore and directed by Oliver Hermanus, based on Benjamin Woolley's book, The King's Assassin (2017).

== See also ==
- Villiers family
