= Christopher Villiers, 1st Earl of Anglesey =

English courtier (1593–1630)

Christopher Villiers, 1st Earl of Anglesey (c. 1593 – 3 April 1630), known at court as Kit Villiers, was an English courtier, Gentleman of the Bedchamber and later Master of the Robes to King James I. In 1623 he was ennobled as Earl of Anglesey and Baron Villiers of Daventry.

With little ability of his own, Villiers prospered chiefly thanks to the influence of his brother George Villiers, 1st Duke of Buckingham, a favourite of James I.

== Life ==
Villiers was the third son of Sir George Villiers (c. 1544–1606) of Brooksby, Leicestershire, by his second marriage, to Mary Beaumont (c. 1570–1632), later created Countess of Buckingham. He had two full brothers, George Villiers, successively Viscount Villiers (1616), then Earl, Marquess, and finally Duke of Buckingham, and John Villiers, first Viscount Purbeck, as well as a sister, Susan, later the countess of William Feilding, 1st Earl of Denbigh; while Sir Edward Villiers and William Villiers were his half-brothers.

Villiers was described as "unattractive and unintelligent" in his youth, but he shared in his family's good fortune flowing from the position of his brother George as king's favourite. In 1617 he was appointed Gentleman of the Bedchamber to King James I, and on 7 March 1617/18 he was granted an annuity of £200.

In December 1617 Sir Robert Naunton (1563–1635) a middle-aged man with no sons, was appointed as Secretary of State on the condition of making Villiers his heir, and during his lifetime Villiers gained from Naunton estates yielding £500 a year. Villiers was granted an interest in the monopoly for gold and silver thread, in respect of which he was disappointed to receive only £150 altogether, but he also had a substantial income from the patent for ale houses. In connection with that, he was accused in parliament of malpractice, but the charges were abandoned. In 1620 Villiers had expectations of becoming Master of the Robes, which would secure his position at court.

Villiers searched for an heiress to marry, bidding unsuccessfully for the hand of the only daughter of Sir Sebastian Harvey, a rich City of London merchant, and that of Elizabeth Norris, daughter of Francis Norris, 1st Earl of Berkshire and Bridget de Vere. On 16 February 1621/22, a few weeks after Lord Berkshire's suicide on 29 January, John Chamberlain (letter writer) wrote to Sir Dudley Carleton:

Your brother Carleton... writes further, that letters are come down for the Coroner, that the evidence touching the Earl of Berkshire's manner of death must not be urged, but the matter be made as fair as may be. It is generally thought, that Kit Villiers shall carry away his daughter. For all I have heard, or can learn, I see no cause of so desperate a resolution, but that he had laesum principium [a crazing of the brain] and the want of God's grace.

This heiress was instead won by Edward Wray, another gentleman of the king's bedchamber, and Joseph Mede wrote to Sir Martin Stuteville on 13 April 1622 "Mr. Wray is turned out of [dismissed from the office of] the bedchamber for marrying the late Earl of Berkshire's daughter, whom Kit Villiers looked for." On 22 June 1622, Chamberlain wrote to Carleton: "The world talks likewise of divers [diverse] new earls to be made – as Kit Villiers, if he can be taken off his wench, Earl of Berkshire."

Villiers then married Elizabeth, the daughter and heir of Thomas Sheldon of Howley, Leicestershire. On 18 April 1623 Villiers was ennobled as Earl of Anglesey and Baron Villiers of Daventry. This had been in the air for more than a year, with the king seeking to persuade Villiers to give up a mistress, but in the event, he had failed to do so. On 19 April, Chamberlain resumed his letters to Carleton:

...But, for the more grace to the Lord of Buckingham in his absence, his brother, Kit Villiers, is presently to be made Baron of Daventry and Earl of Anglesey, with the endowment of £100 land, old rent, and the gift of a forest, which is to be sold or enclosed; so that his lady and cousin is like to be a worthy countess.

If he had had greater abilities, Villiers might have hoped to gain important positions under the Crown, but as he admitted to his powerful brother in 1627, his "want of preferment proceeded from his own unworthiness rather than from the duke's unwillingness". He was known to have a great fondness for alcohol, and shortly after the death of James I on 27 March 1625 he disappeared from the royal court, with the rumour going about that the new king, Charles I, refused to have him because of his drunkenness. Joseph Mede wrote to Sir Martin Stuteville on 23 April 1625:

There was talk here that the Earl of Anglesey (Kit Villiers) was banished the court. The ground of the report, as I heard yesterday, was, that when there was suit made by some great ones, that he might be again sworn of the bedchamber, the king denied it, saying, he would have no drunkards of his chamber.

The appointment of Villiers as Master of the Robes died with the old king, with Charles I retaining Lord Compton, who had served him in that capacity as Prince of Wales. According to one historian of the period, Villiers "summed up all that was unsavoury and corrupt with the court of James I".

His brother, Buckingham, died on 23 August 1628. Despite this, in December 1628 Villiers gained the position of Keeper of Hampton Court Palace, and in March 1629 he became also Keeper of Bushey Park. He was believed to have bought the reversion of the office of Chancellor of the Exchequer from Edward Barrett, 1st Lord Barrett of Newburgh, but he died at Windsor on 3 April 1630. On 12 April he was entombed there in St George's Chapel.

At the time of his death, Villiers was living at Ashley Park, Walton-on-Thames. His widow, Elizabeth, Countess of Anglesey, married secondly Benjamin Weston, Esquire, and they continued to live there. Villiers's titles and estates passed first to his only son, Charles, who died childless on 4 February 1661. Charles had married the widow of his cousin William Villiers, 2nd Viscount Grandison. When she died, many estates passed to Villiers daughter, Anne, widow of Thomas Savile, 1st Earl of Sussex (1590–1659).

== Notes ==
Peerage of England
New creation	Earl of Anglesey; 1st creation 1623–1630	Succeeded by Charles Villiers
