= John Villiers, 3rd Viscount Grandison =

Anglo-Irish peer (c. 1616–1659)

- Born: c. 1616
- Died: 9 November 1659
- Title: 3rd Viscount Grandison
- Predecessor: William Villiers, 2nd Viscount Grandison
- Successor: George Villiers, 4th Viscount Grandison
- Spouse: Catherine Clarke
- Parent(s): Edward Villiers, Barbara St. John

John Villiers, 3rd Viscount Grandison (c. 1616 – 9 November 1659), was an Anglo-Irish peer from the Villiers family. He inherited the title of Viscount Grandison upon the death of his brother William Villiers, 2nd Viscount Grandison, in 1643. After his death in 1661 without issue, his title was inherited by his brother George Villiers, 4th Viscount Grandison. He was married to Catherine Clarke, the daughter of Sir John Clarke (died 1644), until his death.
