= John Villiers, 1st Earl Grandison =

Anglo-Irish politician

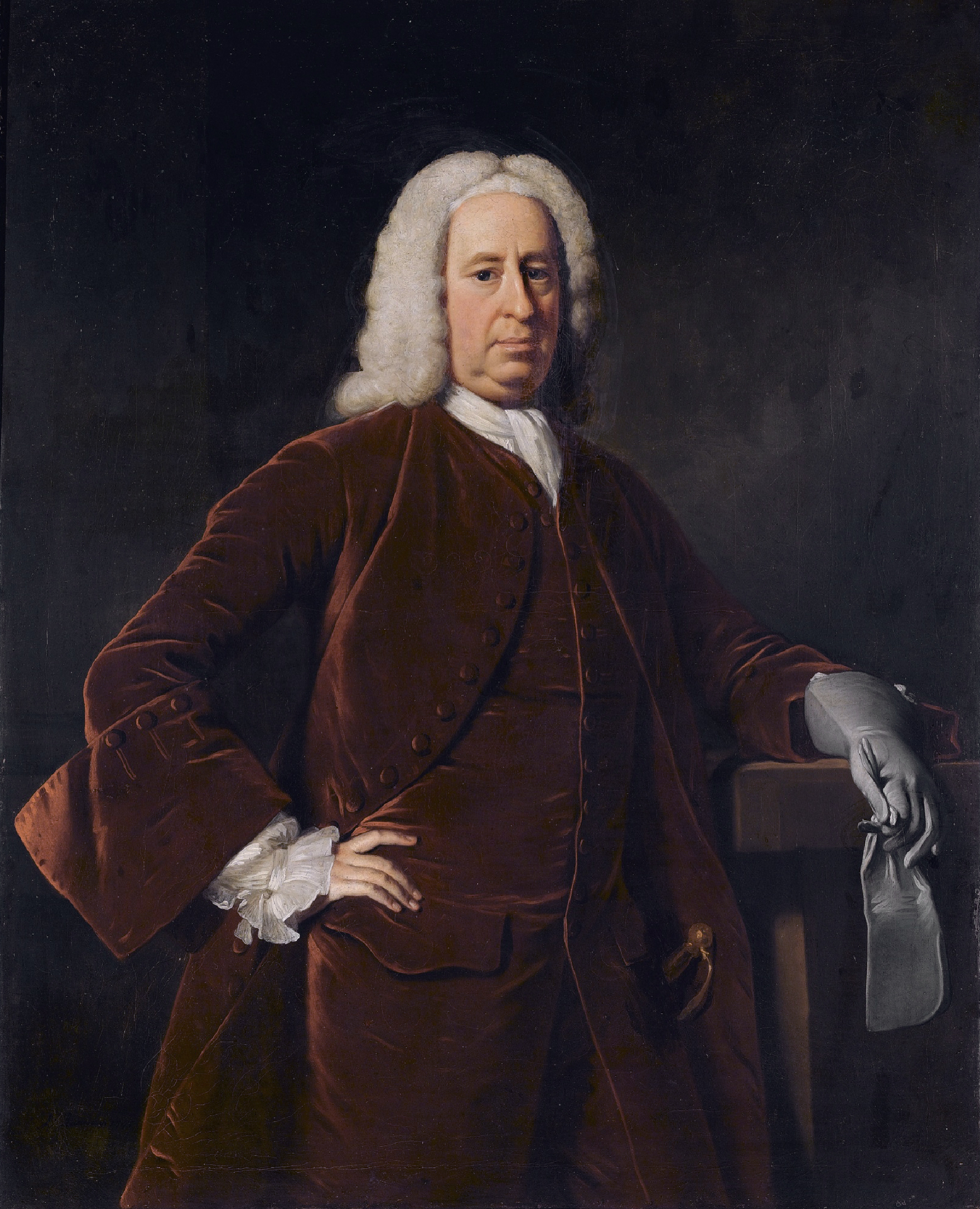
John Villiers, 1st Earl Grandison

John Villiers, 1st Earl Grandison, 5th Viscount Grandison (c.1684 – 14 May 1766) was an Anglo-Irish politician from the Villiers family.

Grandison was the son of Brigadier-General Hon. Edward FitzGerald-Villiers and Katherine FitzGerald. His father was the son of George Villiers, 4th Viscount Grandison, but had assumed the surname of FitzGerald following his marriage. As such, Grandison was also known as John FitzGerald. He was educated at Eton College and Magdalene College, Cambridge. He succeeded to his grandfather's viscountcy on 16 December 1699.

In 1704 he was the Governor of the City of Waterford. As his title was in the Peerage of Ireland, he was not barred from standing for the House of Commons of England. As such, he contested the rotten borough of Old Sarum in May 1705, where he tied with Charles Mompesson for the second seat. After a seven-month legal dispute, the House of Commons ruled in Mompesson's favour. In 1721, he was invested as a member of the Privy Council of Ireland and on 11 September that year was made Earl Grandison, of County Leitrim in the Peerage of Ireland.

John Villiers married Frances Cary, the daughter of Edward Cary and Anne Lucas, in February 1706. Together they had three children, the eldest being James FitzGerald-Villiers, although only one daughter outlived him. As such, his earldom became extinct on his death, while his viscountcy was inherited by his second cousin, William Villiers, 3rd Earl of Jersey.

Peerage of Ireland
New creation	Earl Grandison; 1721–1766	Extinct
Preceded by George Villiers	Viscount Grandison; 1699–1776	Succeeded by William Villiers
