= George Child Villiers, Viscount Villiers =

British peer (1948-1998)

George Henry Child Villiers, Viscount Villiers (29 August 1948 – 19 March 1998) was the first son of George Child Villiers, 9th Earl of Jersey, and his third wife, Bianca Luciana Adriana Mottironi. He was a member of the Villiers family.

He was married three times: firstly, between 1969 and 1973, to Verna Scott; secondly, between 1974 and 1988, Sacha Jane Hooper Lauder, née Valpy; thirdly, from 1992 until his death, Stephanie Louisa Penman. The children of these marriages were:

- With Verna P. Stott:
  1. Lady Sophia Georgiana Child Villiers (b. 25 June 1971)
- With Sacha Jane Hooper Valpy:
  1. George Francis William Child Villiers, 10th Earl of Jersey (b. 5 February 1976); he married Marianne De Guelle on 16 August 2003.
  2. Lady Helen Katherine Luisa Child Villiers (b. 21 October 1978)
  3. Lady Luciana Dorothea Sacha Child Villiers (b. 23 July 1981); she married Robert Shaw on the 13 September 2014. Divorced as of 2024.
- With Stephanie Louisa Penman:
  1. Hon. Jamie Charles Child Villiers (b. 31 May 1994)
