= George Villiers (died 1606) =

English knight (1544–1606)

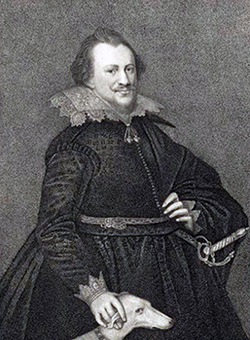
- Portrait of George Villiers by William P. Sherlock

High Sheriff of Leicestershire
- In office 1591

Personal details
- Born: c. 1544
- Died: 4 January 1606 (aged 61–62)
- Spouse(s): Audrey Saunders; Mary Beaumont
- Children: 10, including Edward, John, George, Christopher and Susan
- Parent: William Villiers (Father)
- Relatives: Villiers family Henry Washington (grandson); Frances Coke (daughter-in-law); Katherine Manners (daughter-in-law); William Feilding (son-in-law)

Sir George Villiers (c. 1544 – 4 January 1606) was an English knight and country gentleman. He was a High Sheriff of Leicestershire for the year 1591, and later was briefly a Knight of the Shire, a Member of Parliament representing the county of Leicestershire.

He was the father of George Villiers, 1st Duke of Buckingham, a favourite of James I, and of several other sons who became prominent at court, establishing the Villiers family at the heart of royal circles for several generations.

== Family ==
George Villiers, born about 1544, was the eldest son of William Villiers of Brooksby, Leicestershire, and Colett, widow of Richard Beaumont of Coleorton, Leicestershire, and daughter and heir of Richard Clarke of Willoughby, Warwickshire. The Villiers family had been settled at Brooksby since at least 1235.

== Career ==
Villiers is said to have been a "prosperous sheep farmer". He was High Sheriff of Leicestershire in 1591, and was elected a Knight of the Shire for the county from 1604 until his death. He was knighted in 1593.

== Marriages and issue ==
Villiers married firstly Audrey Saunders (d.1587), the daughter and heir of William Saunders (d. 14 July 1582) of Harrington, Northamptonshire and Frances Zouche, the daughter of William Zouche of Bulwick, Northamptonshire, son of John la Zouche, 7th Baron Zouche (c.1440-1527) of Harringworth, who fought for Richard III at Bosworth, by whom he had two sons and four daughters:

- Sir William Villiers (d. 12 June 1629), the eldest son, who married Rebecca Roper, daughter and co-heir of Robert Roper, esquire, and Elizabeth Nott, the daughter of William Nott, esquire, of Thames Ditton. He was created a baronet in 1619.
- Sir Edward Villiers, who married, about 1612, Barbara St. John, daughter of Sir John St John of Lydiard Tregoze, Wiltshire, by whom he had ten children.
- Elizabeth Villiers (d. 1654), who married John Boteler, 1st Baron Boteler of Brantfield.
- Anne Villiers (b. 1588), who married Sir William Washington (1590–1648), elder brother of Lawrence Washington (the great-great-grandfather of George Washington). She was the mother of Henry Washington and the maternal grandmother of George Legge, 1st Baron Dartmouth, ancestor of the Earls of Dartmouth.
- Frances Villiers, who died without issue.

Villiers married secondly, about 1590, his "beautiful but penniless first cousin by the half-blood", Mary Beaumont (c. 1570 – 1632), daughter of Anthony Beaumont of Glenfield, Leicestershire, with whom he had three sons and a daughter:

- John Villiers, Viscount Purbeck, who married Frances, the daughter of Sir Edward Coke by his second wife, Elizabeth Hatton, née Cecil, daughter of Thomas Cecil, 1st Earl of Exeter. The peerage expired at his death.
- George Villiers, 1st Duke of Buckingham, who married Katherine Manners, (daughter of the 6th Earl of Rutland). The title became extinct in 1687.
- Christopher Villiers, 1st Earl of Anglesey. The earldom and barony became extinct on the death of his son, the second Earl of Anglesey, in 1661.
- Susan Villiers, who married William Feilding, 1st Earl of Denbigh, parents-in-law to James Hamilton, 1st Duke of Hamilton.

== Common ancestor of sixteen British Prime Ministers ==
According to Thomson, Sir George is the ancestor of sixteen British prime ministers:

1. Augustus, 3rd Duke of Grafton
2. William, 3rd Duke of Portland
3. William, 1st Earl of Chatham (Pitt the Elder)
4. William Pitt the Younger
5. William, 4th Duke of Devonshire
6. Lord Melbourne (assuming his father was Lord Egremont)
7. William, 1st Baron Grenville
8. George, 4th Earl of Aberdeen
9. Edward, 14th Earl of Derby
10. John, 1st Earl Russell
11. Robert, 3rd Marquess of Salisbury
12. Arthur Balfour
13. Sir Winston Churchill
14. Sir Anthony Eden
15. Sir Alec Douglas-Home
16. David Cameron

see also Prime Ministers of the United Kingdom
