= John Villiers, Viscount Purbeck =

English courtier (1591–1658)

- Born: c. 1591
- Died: 18 February 1658; Charlton, London, England
- Spouse: Frances Coke, Viscountess Purbeck
- Father: Sir George Villiers
- Mother: Mary Beaumont

John Villiers (c. 1591 – 18 February 1658) was an English courtier from the Villiers family. The eldest son of Sir George Villiers and Mary Beaumont, later Countess of Buckingham, he was the brother of King James I's favourite, George Villiers, 1st Duke of Buckingham.

== Family ==
John Villiers, born about 1591, was the eldest son of Sir George Villiers of Brooksby, Leicestershire, and his second wife, Mary Beaumont, the daughter of Anthony Beaumont of Glenfield, Leicestershire. He had two younger brothers, George Villiers, 1st Duke of Buckingham, and Christopher Villiers, 1st Earl of Anglesey, and a sister, Susan Villiers (died 1651), who married William Feilding, 1st Earl of Denbigh.

By his father's first marriage to Audrey Saunders (died 1587), the daughter of William Saunders (died 14 July 1582) of Harrington, Northamptonshire, and Frances Zouche, the daughter of William Zouche of Bulwick, Northamptonshire, son of John Zouche, 7th Baron Zouche (c. 1440 – 1527) of Harringworth, who fought for Richard III at Bosworth, he was a half-brother of Sir William Villiers and Edward Villiers, Master of the Mint.

== Career ==
Villiers was knighted on 30 June 1616, and in the same year became Groom of the Bedchamber and Master of the Robes to James I. At the same time negotiations were begun by his mother for his marriage with a rich heiress. The lady selected was Frances Coke (1599–1645), the daughter of Sir Edward Coke by his second wife, Lady Hatton, daughter of Thomas Cecil, 1st Earl of Exeter, and widow of Sir William Hatton. Coke was required to give his consent, and to pay a marriage portion of £10,000. He refused to pay more than two-thirds of that sum, and was consequently called upon to resign his seat on the bench.

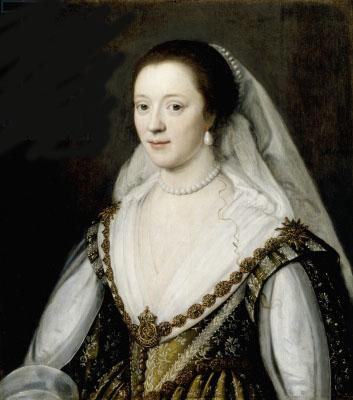
Frances Coke, Villiers's first wife, who caused a notable scandal by leaving him for her lover

Lady Hatton remained strongly opposed to the marriage, but Coke gave way, and on 29 September 1617 Frances Coke and Sir John Villiers were married at Hampton Court, with King James giving away the bride. Lady Hatton still refused to make over her Dorset property to Villiers, and as compensation, he was created Baron Villiers of Stoke (today Coleshill, Buckinghamshire), and Viscount Purbeck of Dorset on 19 July 1619. The marriage proved a disaster; Anthony Weldon reports Buckingham as having said that "his brother Purbeck had more wit and honesty than all the kindred beside", but according to Samuel Rawson Gardiner, he was "weak in mind and body", and soon after 1620 completely lost his reason.

In 1621 his wife deserted him and went to live with Sir Robert Howard. On 19 October 1624 she gave birth to a son, Robert Danvers, and in October she was convicted of adultery. Eventually, she died at Oxford in May 1645 and was buried in St. Mary's.

Purbeck, whose insanity was intermittent, married, as his second wife, Elizabeth Slingsby (died 1696), widow of Colonel Chichester Fortescue of Dromiskin, Ireland, and daughter of Sir William Slingsby of Kippax, West Yorkshire. He died without legitimate issue on 18 February 1658 at Charlton, near Greenwich. The peerage became extinct, though the claim to it put forward by Robert Danvers was for many years a cause célèbre.

== Notes ==
Peerage of England
New creation	Viscount Purbeck; 1619–1658	Extinct
