= Charles Hamilton, Count of Arran (1691–1754) =

18th-century French noble

Charles Hamilton
- Comte d'Arran
- Predecessor: new creation
- Successor: Charles Hamilton
- Born: 30 March 1691; Cleveland House, London
- Died: 13 August 1754 (aged 63); Paris, France
- Buried: Saint-Pierre de Montmartre, Paris
- Noble family: Douglas-Hamilton
- Spouse: Antoinette Courteney of Archambaud
- Issue: Charles Hamilton; Count of Arran
- Father: James Hamilton, 4th Duke of Hamilton
- Mother: Lady Barbara FitzRoy

Charles Hamilton (30 March 1691 – 13 August 1754) was the natural born son of James Hamilton, Earl of Arran and Lady Barbara FitzRoy.

== Early life ==
Hamilton was born in London in his maternal grandmother the Duchess of Cleveland's house, Cleveland House. He was born to the Earl of Arran, the future 4th Duke of Hamilton and his mistress Lady Barbara FitzRoy herself the natural daughter of Charles II of England and Barbara Villiers, Duchess of Cleveland. After his birth, his mother was sent out to become a Nun in the English Priory of St. Nicholas, at Pontoise in Normandy, France, taking the name Sister Benedicta, where she later became prioress in 1721. Hamilton himself was raised by her mother, the Duchess of Cleveland.

== Life in France ==
In 1698 on the marriage of his father to Elizabeth Gerard, Charles was sent to France. He was put under the aegis of the Charles Middleton, 2nd Earl of Middleton, James II's and James III's Secretary of State. While in France Hamilton was styled as the Count of Arran or in French as it would have been Comte d'Arran. Also while in France, Hamilton met and married his wife, Antoinette Courteney, daughter of Charles Courteney of Archambaud and Elizabeth Wyatt. Charles Courteney was a descendant of Francis Courtenay, de jure 4th Earl of Devon. Hamilton and Antoinette Courteney had one son.

While he was styled Count of Arran or Comte d'Arran in France, it is unknown whether he was truly ennobled as Comte or if this was purely honorary. The title can clearly be seen to be a reference to the Earldom of Arran, the subsidiary title of the Dukes of Hamilton, his father's family. There is a strong possibility that it was a genuine title bearing in mind he was from exceptional lineage and even related to the Kings of France. Through his great-grandmother Henrietta Maria of France, Louis XIV would have been his first cousin once-removed and Louis XV his second cousin, twice removed. Therefore with this close relationship between him and the Kings of France the strong likelihood is that it was a genuine title, although there is little evidence to prove this. If it was a genuine title then his male line descendents would be entitled to be Comte d'Arran.

On the death of his father, in the celebrated Hamilton–Mohun duel of 1712 Charles Hamilton issued a challenge to his father's claimed killer Lieutenant-General George Macartney, however this was turned down. After that Hamilton travelled to Switzerland and spent his time living between there and Paris. While in Switzerland he pursued Alchemy and also had a close friendship with George Keith, 10th Earl Marischal. Hamilton also wrote a book, "Transactions During the Reign of Queen Anne, From the Union to the Death of that Princess" which was posthumously published by his son in 1790.

Hamilton died in Paris on 13 August 1754 and was buried in Saint-Pierre de Montmartre, Paris. His estate was left in its entirety to his son.

== Issue ==
Charles Hamilton married Antoinette Courteney, daughter of Charles Courteney of Archambaud and Elizabeth Wyatt, in 1737 in Paris, France. They had one son together:

- Charles Hamilton, born 16 July 1738 in Edinburgh, died 9 April 1800 in Holyroodhouse, married Catherine Napier, daughter of Sir Gerrard Napier, 5th Baronet of Middle March on 15 June 1760 and had two children.

== Ancestors ==
Ancestors of Charles Hamilton, Count of Arran (1691–1754)

16. William Douglas, 10th Earl of Angus
8. William Douglas, 1st Marquess of Douglas
17. Lady Elizabeth Oliphant
4. William Hamilton, Duke of Hamilton
18. George Gordon, 1st Marquess of Huntly
9. Lady Mary Gordon
19. Lady Henrietta Stewart
2. James Hamilton, 4th Duke of Hamilton
20. James Hamilton, 2nd Marquess of Hamilton
10. James Hamilton, 1st Duke of Hamilton
21. Lady Ann Cunningham
5. Anne Hamilton, 3rd Duchess of Hamilton
22. William Feilding, 1st Earl of Denbigh
11. Lady Mary Fielding
23. Susan Villiers
1. Charles Hamilton
24. James I of England
12. Charles I of England
25. Anne of Denmark
6. Charles II of England
26. Henry IV of France
13. Henrietta Maria of France
27. Marie de' Medici
3. Lady Barbara FitzRoy
28. Sir Edward Villiers
14. William Villiers, 2nd Viscount Grandison
29. Barbara St. John
7. Barbara Palmer, 1st Duchess of Cleveland
30. Paul Bayning, 1st Viscount Bayning
15. Mary Bayning
31. Anne Glemham
