= Charles Hamilton, Count of Arran (1738–1800) =

18th-century Scottish-French noble

Charles Hamilton
- Comte d'Arran
- Predecessor: Charles Hamilton
- Successor: William
- Born: 16 July 1738; Edinburgh, Scotland
- Died: 9 April 1800 (aged 61); Holyroodhouse, Edinburgh, Scotland
- Noble family: Douglas-Hamilton
- Spouse: Catherine Napier
- Issue: Lt. Col Sir William; Anne
- Father: Charles Hamilton, Count of Arran
- Mother: Antoinette Courtney
- Occupation: Soldier and Author

Charles Hamilton (16 July 1738 – 9 April 1800), titled Count of Arran from 1754 onwards, was son of Charles Hamilton, Count of Arran and his wife Antoinette Courtney. His paternal grandparents were James Hamilton, 4th Duke of Hamilton and his mistress Lady Barbara FitzRoy. His great grandparents through his paternal grandmother were therefore Charles II of England and his mistress Barbara Palmer, 1st Duchess of Cleveland. Through his mother he was a descendant of the Courtenay family of Devon.

== Life ==
Born in Edinburgh, he spent the majority of his childhood in France and Switzerland. Charles joined the British East India Company and rose to the rank of captain. He was subsequently commissioned into the Royal Scots Greys and rose to the rank of lieutenant colonel. He served in the Seven Years' War and later in the Low Countries with his regiment, culminating in the Flanders campaign.

== Title ==
The title "Count of Arran" was used by Charles' father. It is unclear whether Charles inherited the title, chiefly because it is not certain whether it was a genuine title or merely one he assumed while he was in France. The title is a reference to the Earldom of Arran, the subsidiary title of the Dukes of Hamilton, his grandfather's family. There is a likelihood that it was not just a courtesy title, due to his descent from the Kings of France through his mother. (Through his father's great-grandmother Henrietta Maria of France, Louis XIV would have been his father's first cousin once removed, and Louis XV his second cousin, twice removed.) There is little evidence to prove that it was a genuine French noble title, but if so, then his male line descendants, including Charles, would be entitled to be styled Comte d'Arran. Including the title, he would have been Lt Col Charles Stuart FitzRoy Douglas-Hamilton, Comte d'Arran.

== Issue ==
Charles married Catherine Napier, daughter of Sir Gerrard Napier, 5th Baronet of Middle March and Bridget Phelips, daughter of Edward Phelips of Montacute House and granddaughter of Sir Edward Phelips of Montacute. They were married on 15 June 1760 and had two children:

== Literary work ==
Charles went on to publish a book written by his father, Transactions during the Reign of Queen Anne, from the Union to the Death of that Princess in 1790. He also wrote books of his own, The Patriot; Tragedy, altered from the Italian of Metastasio, an eight volume set in 1784; An Historical Relation of the Origin, Progress, and Final Dissolution of the Government of the Rohilla Afghans, in the Northern Provinces of Hindustan, compiled from a Persian Man, and the original papers, another eight volume set in 1787; and finally Hedaya, or Guide; a Commentary on the Mussulman Laws, translated by order of the Governor-General and Council of Bengal, a four volume set published in 1791. He published all of these books under the name Charles Hamilton.

== Ancestry ==
Ancestors of Charles Hamilton, Count of Arran (1738–1800)

16. William Douglas, 1st Marquess of Douglas
8. William Douglas-Hamilton, Duke of Hamilton
17. Lady Mary Gordon
4. James Hamilton, 4th Duke of Hamilton
18. James Hamilton, 1st Duke of Hamilton
9. Anne Hamilton, 3rd Duchess of Hamilton
19. Lady Mary Fielding
2. Charles Hamilton, Count of Arran
20. Charles I of England
10. Charles II of England
21. Henrietta Maria of France
5. Lady Barbara FitzRoy
22. William Villiers, 2nd Viscount Grandison
11. Barbara Villiers, 1st Duchess of Cleveland
23. Hon. Mary Bayning
1. Charles Hamilton, Count of Arran
24. Francis Courtenay, de jure 4th Earl of Devon
12. Edward Courteney
25. Elizabeth Seymour
6. Charles Courteney of Archambaud
26. John Moore
13. Frances Moore
27. Elizabeth Honeywood
3. Antoinette Courteney
28. Edwin Wyatt
14. Thomas Wyatt
29. Frances Crispe
7. Elizabeth Wyatt
30. Henry Wyatt
15. Elizabeth Wyatt
31. Jane Duke
