= James Hamilton, 4th Duke of Hamilton =

Scottish army officer, politician, courtier and diplomat (1658–1712)

Lieutenant-General His Grace The Duke of Hamilton KG KT
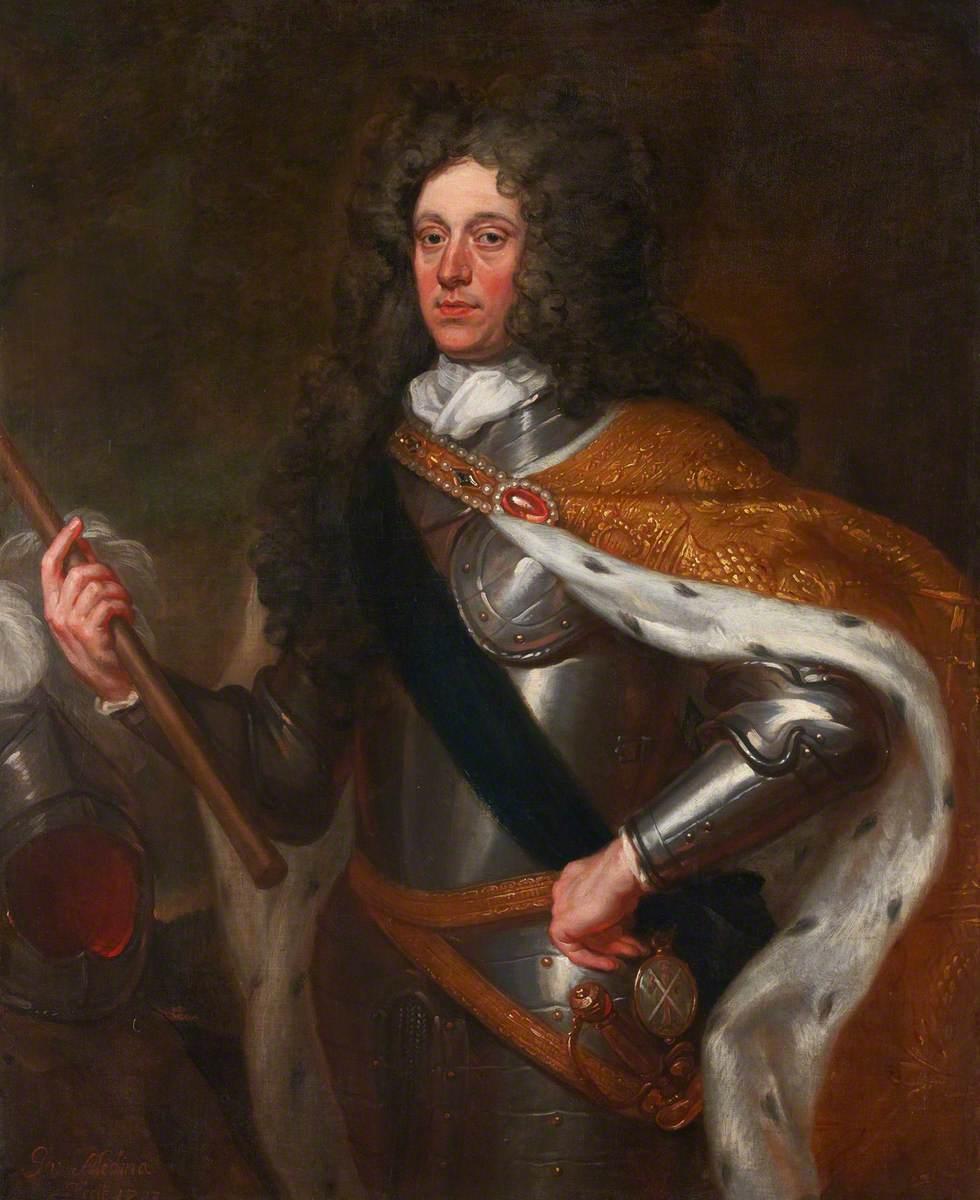
- Portrait by John Baptist Medina, 1703
- Born: 11 April 1658; Hamilton Palace, Lanarkshire, Scotland
- Died: 15 November 1712 (aged 54); Hyde Park, London, England
- Spouses: Anne Spencer (m. 1686; died 1690) Elizabeth Gerard (m. 1698)
- Children: Lady Elizabeth Hamilton; Lady Catherine Hamilton; Lady Charlotte Edwin; James Hamilton, 5th Duke of Hamilton; Lord William Hamilton; Lady Susan Hamilton; Lord Anne Hamilton; Sir James Abercrombie, 1st Baronet; Charles Hamilton, Count of Arran
- Parent(s): William Douglas, 1st Earl of Selkirk; Anne Hamilton, 3rd Duchess of Hamilton

James Hamilton, 4th Duke of Hamilton and 1st Duke of Brandon (11 April 1658 – 15 November 1712) was a Scottish army officer, politician, courtier and diplomat. He was a major investor in the failed Darien scheme, which cost many of Scotland's ruling class their fortunes. He led the Country Party in the Parliament of Scotland and the opposition to the Act of Union in 1707. He died as the result of the Hamilton–Mohun duel in Hyde Park, Westminster, with Charles Mohun, 4th Baron Mohun, over a disputed inheritance.

== Early life ==
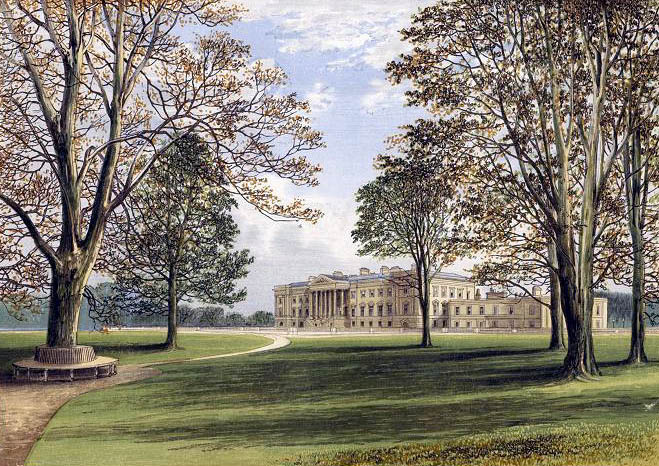
Hamilton Palace – seat of the Dukes of Hamilton

The eldest son of William Douglas, 1st Earl of Selkirk (who was created Duke of Hamilton for his lifetime and changed his surname to Hamilton in 1660), and his wife Anne, 3rd Duchess of Hamilton in her own right, Hamilton was born at Hamilton Palace, in Lanarkshire. He was a descendant through his mother of the Scottish House of Stewart and therefore had a significant claim to the thrones of both Scotland and England. He was educated by a series of tutors, until he was of age to attend the University of Glasgow. Following this, he travelled to the continent on the Grand Tour, fashionable amongst young noblemen of the time. He was styled until 1698 as the Earl of Arran.

In 1679, Arran was appointed a Gentleman of the Bedchamber by Charles II. Later in 1683, he was accredited ambassador to the Court of Louis XIV of France. Arran remained in France for over a year, taking part in two campaigns in French service. On his return to Great Britain following the accession of James VII and II, he brought letters of personal recommendation from Louis to the new King. King James reaffirmed Arran in his offices. Arran was in the first cohort of James VII's royal Order of the Thistle in 1687, and following the deposition of James, Arran refused to join the party of the Prince of Orange, indeed he was imprisoned twice in the Tower of London, suspected of intrigues, but was released without charge.

== Duke of Hamilton ==
Arran's father died in 1694, and in July 1698 his mother resigned all her titles into the hand of King William, who regranted them to Arran a month later in a charter signed at Het Loo, Netherlands. He was confirmed in the titles of Duke of Hamilton, Marquess of Clydesdale, Earl of Arran, Lanark and Cambridge and Lord Aven, Polmont, Machansyre, and Innerdale. This regrant of title was presumably because of the loyalty of Arran's parents to the king, as his own affection to the House of Orange was questionable due to his suspected Jacobitism. He was arrested more than once for pro-Stuart activities.

== The Darien scheme and the Act of Union ==
Hamilton formed a political group which supported the Darien scheme in the Parliament of Scotland. He and his mother had heavily invested in the expedition, that ultimately failed, resulting in Scotland losing 20% of its currency in circulation at the time. Historian Stephen Mullen referred to the scheme as a "mercantilist venture designed to improve personal fortunes and Scotland's balance of trade through colonisation and exploitation". As part of the scheme, Hamilton planned to import African slaves "to be worked to death" at local gold mines in the region after they had come under the colonists' control.

Following the failure of Darien, and in light of the longer history of trade friction with England, serious machinations began proposing a union between the two realms of Scotland and England. Hamilton was assumed to be the head of the anti-union Cavalier Party, perhaps due to his serious claim to the throne of Scotland. Hamilton, being a descendant through his mother of the Scottish House of Stewart (prior to their accession to the English throne) was the senior-most claimant to the throne of Scotland in the event that Scotland chose not to accept Sophia of the Palatinate as the Stuart heiress (see Act of Security 1704). Sophia was the most junior descendant of the most junior branch of the English Stuarts and Scotland, also being Protestant, would only accept a Protestant heir to Scotland. This meant that Hamilton and his heirs were next in the Scottish line of succession after the House of Hanover. To the detriment of his royal future, Hamilton's political conduct proved ineffective and he wavered between both the Court and the National parties. On the day of the final vote regarding the Anglo-Scottish union, Hamilton abstained and remained in his chambers at Holyrood Palace claiming to be indisposed by toothache. The highly unpopular Acts of Union were passed, and riots followed in the streets of Edinburgh. Hamilton had missed his chance to secure the Scottish succession for his family.

== Post Union ==
Hamilton was chosen as one of 16 Scottish representative peers in 1708. He was created Duke of Brandon, Suffolk, in the Peerage of Great Britain in 1711. This drew criticism as to the legality of his position and ability to sit in the House of Lords. The situation was not resolved until 1782 for the 6th Duke of Hamilton. In addition to the Dukedom, Hamilton was created Baron Dutton in Cheshire. In October 1712 he was created a Knight of the Garter, making him the only non-royal to be a knight of both Thistle and Garter. In 1711 he was elected a brother of the Tory Loyal Brotherhood.

== The Macclesfield inheritance and death ==
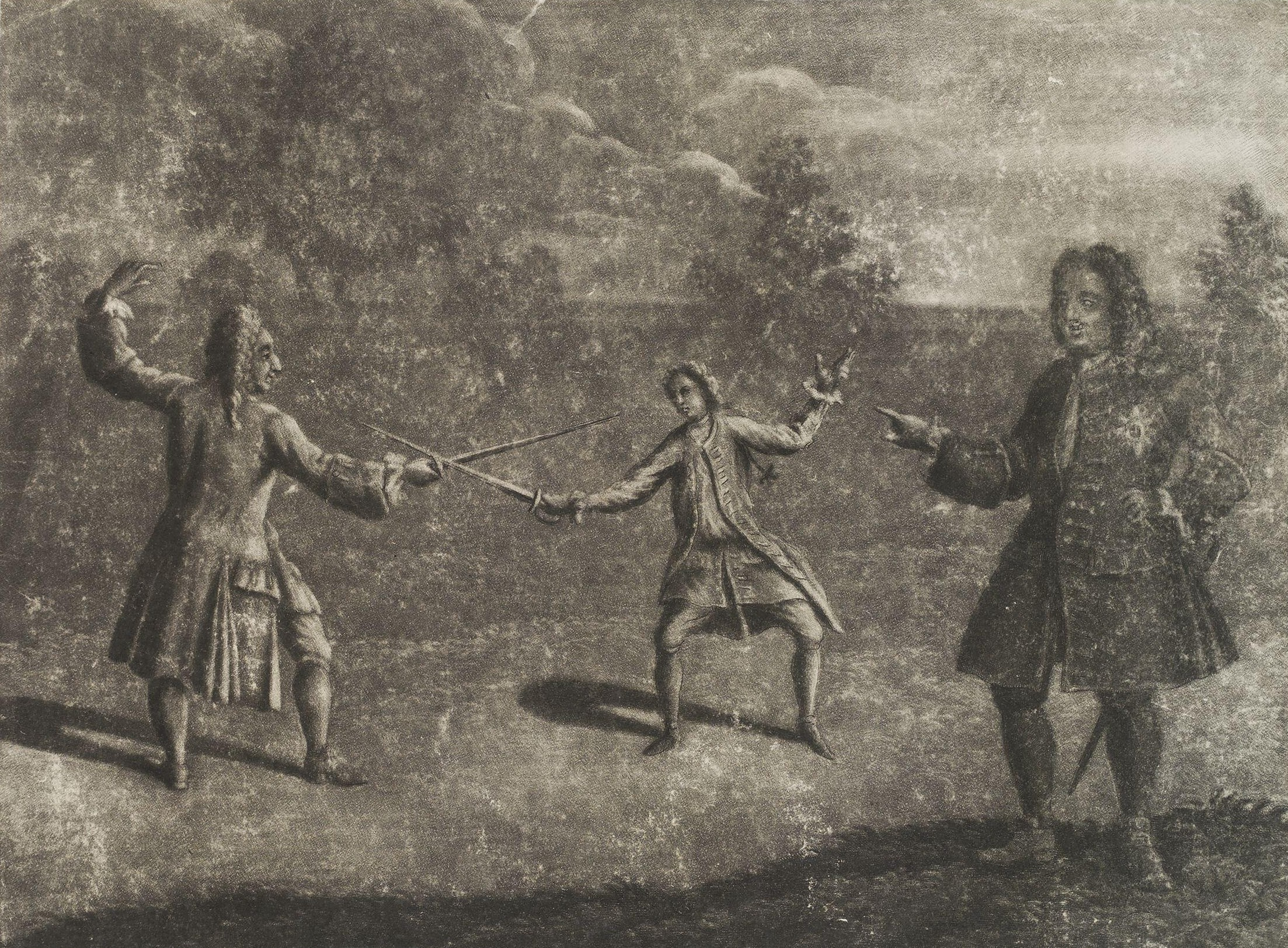
Engraving of the Hamilton–Mohun duel

On 15 November 1712, Hamilton fought a celebrated duel with Charles, Lord Mohun, in Hyde Park, Westminster, in an episode narrated in Thackeray's The History of Henry Esmond. Following the death without an heir of Fitton Gerard, third Earl of Macclesfield, in 1702, a disagreement had arisen over who should succeed to his extensive estates, based at Gawsworth Hall, Cheshire. Hamilton claimed the estates through his wife Elizabeth Gerard, a granddaughter of Charles Gerard, 1st Earl of Macclesfield. Mohun claimed them as the named heir of Charles Gerard, 2nd Earl of Macclesfield, to whom he had been a companion-in-arms. The years of litigation that followed culminated in Mohun calling Hamilton out.

The duel took place on the morning of the 15th. The older Hamilton mortally wounded Mohun, and was mortally wounded in turn. Hamilton's second, his relation John, thereafter claimed that Mohun's second George Macartney had dealt the final stroke to Hamilton whilst pretending to attend to Mohun, but the evidence was wholly inconclusive. Questions about why John Hamilton did not stay to attempt to arrest Macartney if he had thought that such a crime had been committed brought suspicion on his testimony. A cry for justice went up amongst the Duke's friends, including Jonathan Swift, and Macartney escaped to the continent. After attempts to repatriate him, he was tried in absentia for murder, and stripped of his regiment, but was later pardoned.

== Marriages and children ==
In 1686 Hamilton married Lady Anne Spencer, daughter of Robert Spencer, 2nd Earl of Sunderland. They had two daughters in 1689 and 1690, although neither survived childhood. Anne died shortly after the birth of the second daughter in 1690.

Hamilton then married Elizabeth Gerard, daughter of Digby Gerard, 5th Baron Gerard, in 1698 (died February 1743/4), and had seven children:

- Lady Elizabeth Hamilton (1699–1702)
- Lady Catherine Hamilton (c. 1700 – 22 Dec 1712)
- Lady Charlotte Hamilton (c. 1701 – 1774), who married Charles Edwin, MP, of Llanfihangel, and was a figure in early Methodism.
- James Hamilton, 5th Duke of Hamilton (1703–1743)
- Lord William Hamilton (c. 1705 – 1734)
- Lady Susan Hamilton (c. 1706–1753), who married Anthony Keck, MP for Woodstock.
- Lord Anne Hamilton (1709–1748), ancestor of the 13th and subsequent Dukes of Hamilton.

In addition, Hamilton had four illegitimate children:

- Lt. Col. Sir James Abercrombie, 1st Baronet, born prior to 1680, who died at Dunkirk in 1724. Sir James entered the Royal Scots, rose to the rank of lieutenant colonel and fought in the Battle of Blenheim as aide-de-camp to his uncle George Douglas-Hamilton, 1st Earl of Orkney. He went on to become a Whig MP for Dysart Burghs in 1710.
- Sir Charles Hamilton KB, born to Lady Barbara FitzRoy. Charles was exiled to France on his father's marriage to his second wife and whilst there, he was styled Count of Arran and married Antoinette Courtney, daughter of Charles Courtney of Archambaud. By Antoinette he had his son, Charles Hamilton who went on to become Lieutenant Colonel in the Royal Scots Greys and was created a Knight Companion of the Order of the Bath.
- Hamilton also had two daughters named Ruthven.

== Ancestors ==
Ancestors of James Hamilton, 4th Duke of Hamilton

William Douglas, 10th Earl of Angus
William Douglas, 1st Marquess of Douglas
Lady Elizabeth Oliphant
William Douglas, 1st Earl of Selkirk
George Gordon, 1st Marquess of Huntly
Lady Mary Gordon
Lady Henrietta Stewart
James Hamilton, 4th Duke of Hamilton
James Hamilton, 2nd Marquess of Hamilton
James Hamilton, 1st Duke of Hamilton
Lady Ann Cunningham
Anne Hamilton, 3rd Duchess of Hamilton
William Feilding, 1st Earl of Denbigh
Lady Mary Feilding
Susan Villiers

== Coat of arms ==
Coat of arms of James Hamilton, 4th Duke of Hamilton
Crest 1st, on a Ducal Coronet an Oak Tree rutted and penetrated transversely in the main stem by a Frame Saw proper the frame Or (Hamilton); 2nd, on a Chapeau Gules turned up Ermine a Salamander in flames proper (Douglas) Escutcheon Quarterly: 1st and 4th grandquarters: quarterly: 1st and 4th, Gules three Cinquefoils Ermine (Hamilton); 2nd and 3rd, Argent a Lymphad with the sails furled proper flagged Gules (Arran); 2nd and 3rd grandquarters: Argent a Heart Gules imperially crowned Or on a Chief Azure three Mullets of the first (Douglas) Supporters On either side an Antelope Argent armed unguled ducally gorged and chained Or Motto Over 1st crest: Through; Over 2nd crest: Jamais Arriere (Never Behind)

== Notes ==
James Hamilton, 4th Duke of Hamilton House of Douglas and Angus Born: 4 April 1658 Died: 15 November 1712
Military offices
Preceded by (regiment raised)	Colonel of the Earl of Arran's Regiment of Cuirassiers; 1685–1688	Succeeded by Charles Hamilton
Preceded by The Duke of Berwick	Colonel of The Royal Regiment of Horse; 1688	Succeeded by The Earl of Oxford
Preceded by The Earl Rivers	Master-General of the Ordnance; 1712	Vacant Title next held by The Duke of Marlborough
Diplomatic posts
Vacant War of Spanish Succession Title last held by The Earl of Manchester as English Ambassador to France	British Ambassador to France; 1712	Succeeded by The Duke of Shrewsbury
Court offices
Preceded by The Viscount Preston	Master of the Great Wardrobe; 1688–1689	Succeeded by The Earl of Montagu
Honorary titles
Preceded by The Earl of Derby	Lord Lieutenant of Lancashire; 1710–1712	Vacant Title next held by The Earl of Derby
Preceded by The Earl of Derby	Vice-Admiral of Lancashire; 1712	Vacant Title next held by Lord Stanley
Peerage of Scotland
Preceded by Anne Hamilton	Duke of Hamilton; 1698–1712	Succeeded by James Hamilton
Peerage of Great Britain
New title	Duke of Brandon; 1711–1712	Succeeded by James Hamilton
