= Elizabeth Boyle, Countess of Guilford =

Elizabeth Boyle, Countess of Guildford, (née Feilding; died circa 3 September 1667) was an English peeress. She was created 1st Countess of Guildford for life at the Restoration on 14 July 1660, which became extinct upon her death c. 3 September 1667. She held the office of Groom of the Stole and Lady of the Bedchamber to the queen dowager, Henrietta Maria.

== Family ==
She was born Elizabeth Feilding, the daughter of Sir William Feilding (later created 1st Earl of Denbigh) and his wife Susan Villiers, herself sister to the royal favourite George Villiers, 1st Duke of Buckingham. William Feilding benefited greatly from his brother-in-law's rise in court, receiving various offices and dignities. He married circa 1607 and was invested as a knight around the same time, in March 1606/7. He was then created 1st Baron Feilding of Newnham Paddox in 1620, and 1st Earl of Denbigh and 1st Viscount Feilding on 14 September 1622.

Elizabeth Feilding had two sisters and two brothers which survived infancy. Her brother Basil, born ca. 1608, became the 2nd Earl of Denbigh upon their father's death. Her sister Margaret, also known as Mary, born ca. 1613, married James Hamilton, 1st Duke of Hamilton, and was the mother of Anne Hamilton, 3rd Duchess of Hamilton. Her brother George, born ca. 1614, became the 1st Earl of Desmond.

In the early 1620s, her maternal grandmother Mary Villiers, Countess of Buckingham, converted to Roman Catholicism, which probably influenced other members of the family including her mother, Susan, who converted to Catholicism after the death of her husband. Elizabeth and her sister Mary were known to be devout Catholics. On 21 January, either 1639 or 1640, Lady Elizabeth appeared as a masque in Salmacida Spolia.

== Marriage ==
On 26 December 1639, Elizabeth was married at Chapel Royal, Whitehall to an Anglo-Irish peer, Lewis "the Valiant" Boyle, 1st Viscount Boyle of Kinalmeaky, the second son of Richard Boyle, 1st Earl of Cork. As a result of her marriage, she was styled as "Viscountess Boyle of Kinalmeaky".

Francis, Lord Willoughby, reported a story about her wedding day to the Earl of Rutland. Boyle, according to Willoughby, had certain diseases and also a war injury that would have prevented him consummating the marriage. Ahead of the wedding he told his sister Lettice, Lady Goring, about this problem and they planned the excuse that she would tell everyone he had fallen down the stairs. However, Lettice told his secret to her husband George Goring, who told Henrietta Maria. The queen advised Feilding not to go to bed with her husband on her wedding night. Boyle soon realised that everyone at court knew about his health problems, and either fled to France or went into hiding in London.

On 6 June 1641 a barge carrying Elizabeth, her father, Lady Cornwallis, and Anne Kirke capsized while "shooting the rapids" at London Bridge. Kirke was drowned but the other passengers were rescued.

Her sisters-in-law included Lady Alice Boyle and Lady Sarah Boyle, and her brothers-in-law included Richard Boyle, 1st Earl of Burlington; Robert Boyle; and Roger Boyle, 1st Earl of Orrery. The marriage was brief, lasting less than three years; she was soon left a widow by her husband's death in 1642. Lord Kinalmeaky was killed at the battle of Liscarroll, at the start of the Irish Confederate Wars. She never remarried.

== Later life ==
During the following "dark days of the Irish Rebellion," Elizabeth stayed with her father-in-law, Lord Cork, who refers to her often, with special fondness, in his letters. Eventually he sent her away to England, for safety's sake. "God knows," he writes, "with what grief of soul I part with her." Her father fought in the English Civil War, as a Royalist. Lady Kinalmeaky became a Roman Catholic and shared for some years Queen Henrietta Maria's exile in France along with her mother, the Countess of Denbigh, who also attended the Queen.

While in France she had charge of Margaret Blagge, daughter of Colonel Thomas Blagge and eventually wife of Sidney Godolphin and mother of Francis Godolphin. John Evelyn, author of the book The Life of Mrs Godolphin, depicts Lady Guilford as a harsh, overly religious governess.

After the Restoration, she was made Countess of Guildford for life by Charles II on 14 July 1660. She also held the office of Groom of the Stole and Lady of the Bedchamber to Henrietta Maria, then the Queen-Mother. She died without issue c. 3 September 1667 at Colombes, France. Her will (dated 2 September 1667) was probated on 20 November 1667. Upon her death, the earldom of Guildford became extinct.

== Styles ==
- Elizabeth Boyle, Countess of Guildford;
- Viscountess Boyle of Kinalmeaky;
- Baroness of Bandon.

== Sources ==
- Palgrave, Mary E. Mary Rich, Countess of Warwick (1625–1678)
- Townshend, Dorothea Baker (2008), The Life and Letters of the Great Earl of Cork. Bryant Press, 2008.
