= Elizabeth Boyle =

Elizabeth Boyle may refer to:

- Elizabeth Killigrew, Viscountess Shannon (1622–1680), married name Boyle, English courtier
- Elizabeth Boyle, Countess of Guilford (died 1667), English peeress
- Bess Boyle (1913–2000), American screenwriter
