= Frances Vane =

Frances Vane may refer to:

- Frances Vane, Marchioness of Londonderry, English heiress and noblewoman
- Frances Vane, Viscountess Vane, British memoirist
