= William Hamilton, 2nd Duke of Hamilton =

17th-century Scottish politician and peer

His Grace The Duke of Hamilton KG
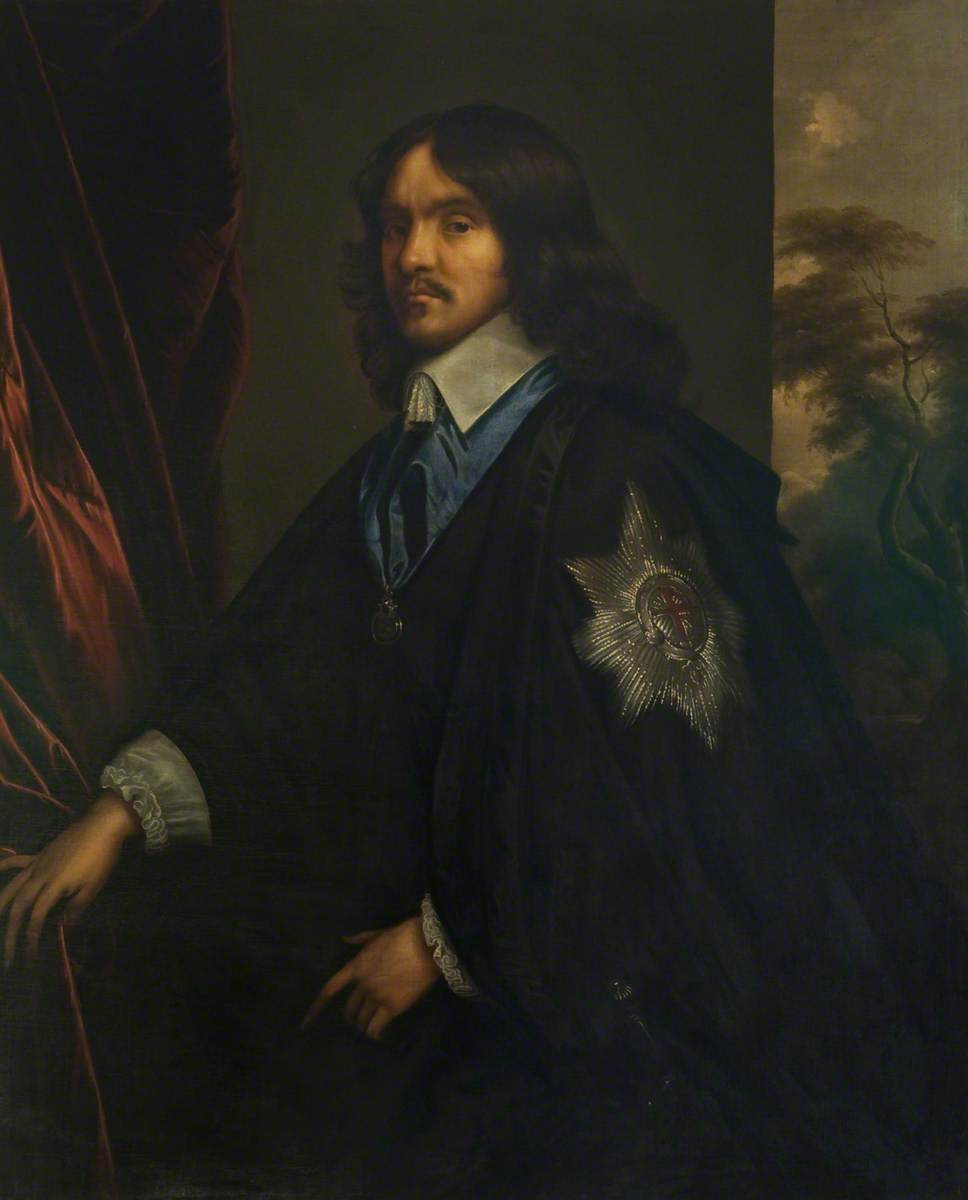
- after Adriaen Hanneman, 1625–1650
- Predecessor: James Hamilton, 1st Duke of Hamilton
- Successor: Anne Hamilton, 3rd Duchess of Hamilton
- Other titles: Earl of Lanark, Earl of Cambridge, Lord Machanshyre, Lord Polmont
- Born: 14 December 1616; Hamilton Palace, Lanarkshire, Scotland
- Died: 12 September 1651 (aged 34); The Commandery, Worcester
- Buried: Worcester Cathedral
- Noble family: Hamilton
- Spouse: Lady Elizabeth Maxwell
- Issue: James Hamilton, Lord Polmont; Anne Carnegie, Countess of Southesk; Lady Elizabeth Cunningham; Mary Ogilvy, Countess of Findlater; Lady Margaret Blair; Lady Diana Hamilton
- Father: James Hamilton, 2nd Marquess of Hamilton
- Mother: Lady Ann Cunningham

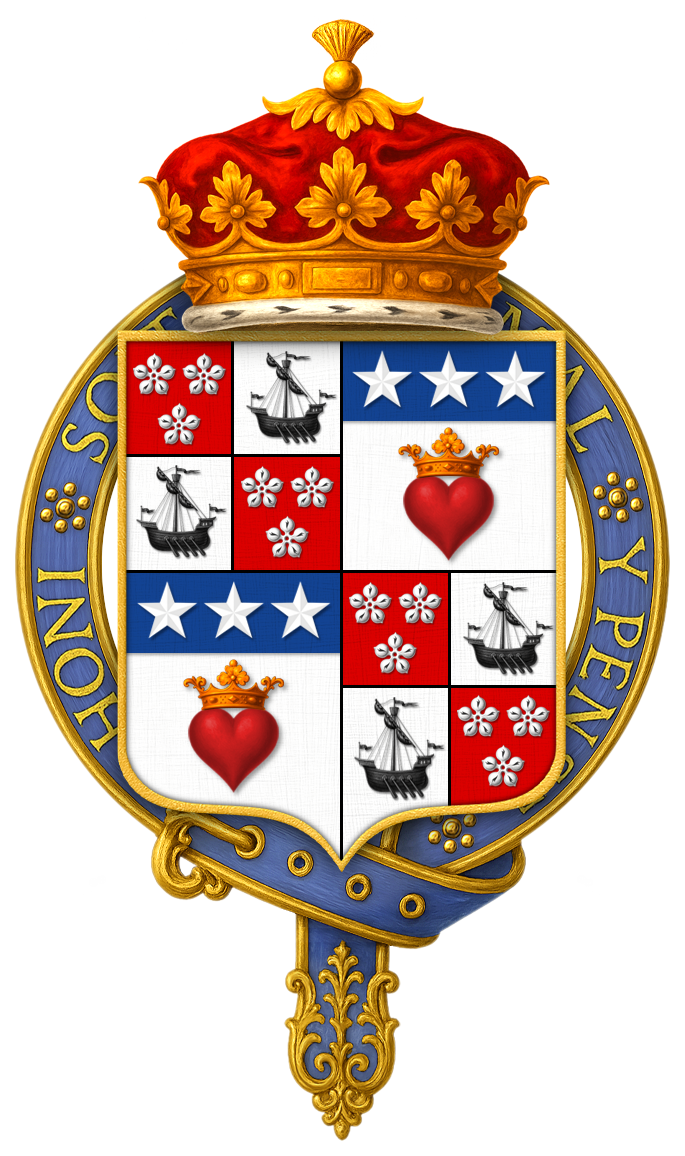
Quartered arms of William Hamilton, 2nd Duke of Hamilton, KG

William Hamilton, 2nd Duke of Hamilton (14 December 1616 – 12 September 1651) was a Scottish nobleman who supported both Royalist and Presbyterian causes during the Wars of the Three Kingdoms.

== Life ==
Hamilton was born at Hamilton Palace in on 14 December 1616, the younger son of James Hamilton, 2nd Marquess of Hamilton and Lady Ann Cunningham. Hamilton was educated at the University of Glasgow, and from there travelled to Continental Europe, where he spent time at the court of Louis XIII of France, on his return aged 21 he established himself as a favourite at the court of Charles I in London.

Hamilton was created Earl of Lanark, Lord Machanshyre and Polmont in the Peerage of Scotland in 1639, and in April 1640 was elected Member of Parliament for Portsmouth in the House of Commons of England for the Short Parliament. He became Secretary of State for Scotland. In 1643, he was arrested at Oxford on the orders of King Charles I for "concurrence" with his brother the Duke of Hamilton. He escaped and was temporarily reconciled with the Presbyterian party.

After taking part in the Battle of Kilsyth on the covenanter side, Hamilton was sent by the Scottish Estates of the Realm to treat with Charles I at Newcastle in 1646, when he sought in vain to persuade the king to consent to the establishment of Presbyterianism in England. On 26 September 1647 he signed, on behalf of the Scots, the treaty with Charles known as the "Engagement", at Carisbrooke Castle, and helped to organise the Second English Civil War.

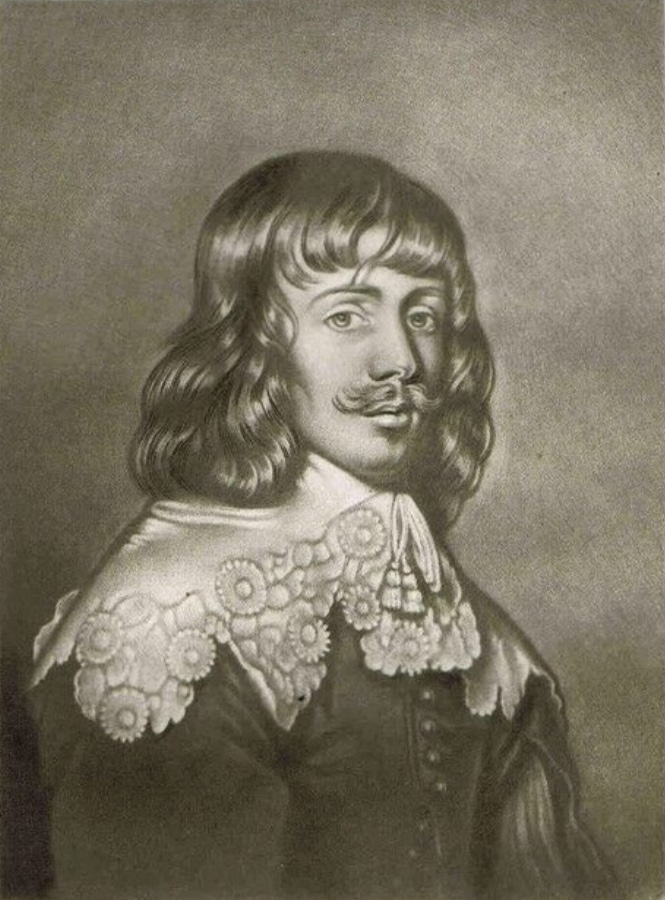
Mezzotint of Hamilton by Robert Dunkarton

In 1648 Hamilton fled to Holland to the court in exile of the Prince of Wales at The Hague. The following year he succeeded to the Dukedom of Hamilton, the Marquisate of Hamilton, the Earldoms of Arran and Cambridge and Lordships of Aven and Innerdale following his brother's execution, making him the most senior figure among the Scots Royalist exiles. In 1650, the insignia of the Order of the Garter were conferred upon him. He returned to Scotland with King Charles II in 1650, but, finding a reconciliation with the Marquess of Argyll impossible, he refused to prejudice Charles's cause by pushing his claims.

Hamilton retired to his estates on the Isle of Arran until the Scottish invasion of England during the 1650 to 1652 Anglo-Scottish War, when he acted as colonel of a regiment drawn mainly from his tenantry.

== Death and burial ==
At the Battle of Worcester on 3 September 1651, Hamilton was shot in the leg with a musket and he was taken back to his lodgings at The Commandery, Charles II's headquarters in that city, which had since been taken over by Roundhead soldiers.

At The Commandery, his leg was examined by both a Cavalier surgeon, who believed the leg should be amputated, and a Roundhead surgeon sent by Oliver Cromwell, who believed the leg did not need to be amputated – Hamilton refused to have his leg amputated by the Roundhead surgeon as he perceived all Roundheads to be traitors.

On his deathbed on 8 September, Hamilton had just enough energy to write the following farewell letter to his wife:

"Dear Heart,

YOV know I have been long labouring, though in great weakness, to be prepared against this expected Change, and I thank my God I find Comfort in it, in this my day of Tryal; for my Body is not more weakned by my Wounds, then I find my Spirit Comforted and Supported by the infinite Mercies and great Love of my Blessed Redeemer, who will be with me to the end and in the end.

I am not able to say much more to you, the Lord preserve you under your Tryals, and sanctifie the use of them to the Comfort of your Soul.

I will not so much as in a Letter divide my dear Neeces and you; the Lord grant you may be constant Comforts to one another in this Life, and send you all Eternal Happiness with your Saviour in the Life to come: to both of your Cares I recommend my poor Children, let your great Work be to make them early acquainted with God, and their Duties to him; and though they may suffer many wants here before their Removal from hence, yet they will find an inexhaustible Treasure in the Love of Christ. May the Comforts of the Blessed Spirit be ever near you in all your Straits and Difficulties, and suffer not the least repining to enter into any of your Hearts for his Dispensations towards me, for his Mercies have been infinitely above his Iustice in the whole Pilgrimage of,

Dear Heart, Your Own, HAMILTON.

Worcester, Sept. 8. 1651."

He died from exhaustion linked to his injuries four days later on 12 September 1651 and he was buried in Worcester Cathedral against his wishes as he wished to be buried in Scotland.

A neighbouring street, Hamilton Road, is named in his honour.

== Family ==
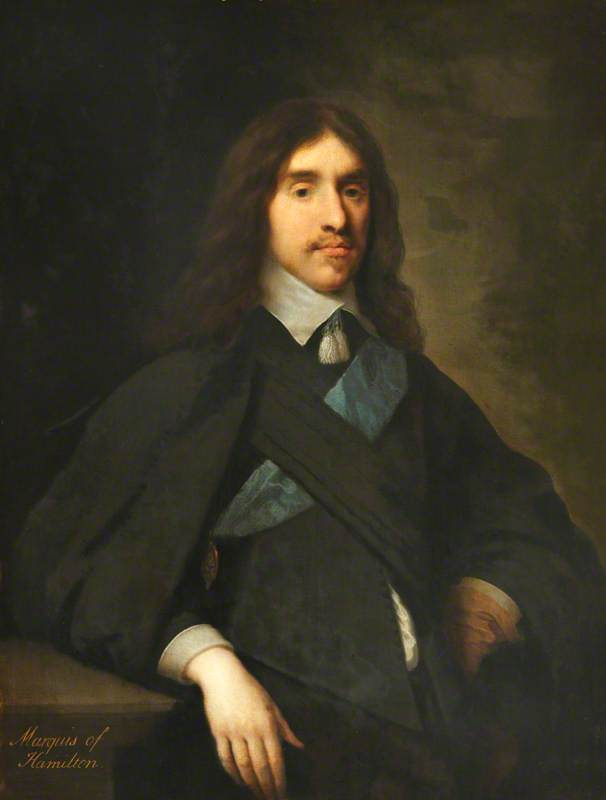
17th-century portrait of Hamilton (artist unknown)

Hamilton married Lady Elizabeth Maxwell, daughter of James Maxwell, 1st Earl of Dirletoun on 26 May 1638, and had issue:

- James Hamilton, Lord Polmont (died in infancy, buried at Westminster Abbey)
- Lady Anne Hamilton, married Robert Carnegie, 3rd Earl of Southesk
- Lady Elizabeth Hamilton, married 1st Lord Kilmaurs, 2nd Sir David Cunningham of Robertland
- Lady Mary Hamilton, married 1st Alexander Livingston, 2nd Earl of Callendar, 2nd Sir James Livingstone of Westquarter, 3rd James Ogilvy, 3rd Earl of Findlater
- Lady Margaret Hamilton, married William Blair of that ilk.
- Lady Diana Hamilton, (died in infancy)

Leaving four daughters but no male heirs, according to the remainder, the dukedom of Hamilton devolved on Hamilton's eldest surviving niece, Anne, who became Duchess of Hamilton in her own right.

== In literature ==
A highly fictionalised Hamilton is depicted in Nigel Tranter's Montrose trilogy.

== Notes ==
Parliament of England
Parliament suspended since 1629	Member of Parliament for Portsmouth; 1640; With: Henry Percy	Succeeded by George Goring; Henry Percy
Political offices
Preceded by The Earl of Stirling	Secretary of State, Scotland; 1641–1649; With: Sir Robert Spottiswood 1644	Succeeded by The Earl of Lothian
Peerage of Scotland
Preceded by James Hamilton	Duke of Hamilton; 1649–1651	Succeeded by Anne Hamilton
New creation	Earl of Lanark; 1639–1651	Succeeded by Anne Hamilton
Peerage of England
Preceded by James Hamilton	Earl of Cambridge; 4th creation 1649–1651	Extinct
