= Lady Barbara FitzRoy =

British prioress (1672–1737)

- Born: 16 July 1672; Cleveland House, London
- Died: 6 May 1737 (aged 64); Priory of St. Nicholas, Pontoise
- Children: Charles Hamilton (illegitimate)
- Parent(s): Barbara Palmer, 1st Duchess of Cleveland; Charles II of England (possible father)

Lady Barbara FitzRoy (16 July 1672 – 6 May 1737), was the sixth and youngest child of Barbara Palmer, 1st Duchess of Cleveland, a mistress of Charles II of England. Charles never publicly acknowledged her as his child, as he was probably not the father. She became a Benedictine nun, known as Benedite.

== Early life ==
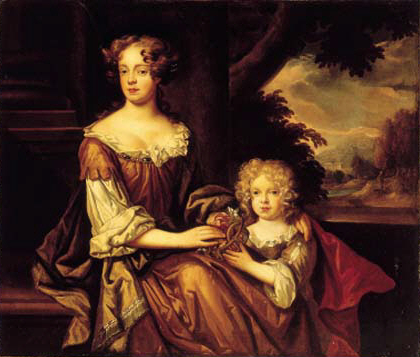
Barbara and her mother, by Thomas Pooley

Barbara was born at Cleveland House in St Martin in the Fields, London, England on 16 July 1672. Around the time she was born, Louise de Kérouaille was replacing her mother as the king's primary mistress.

Although her mother insisted she was a daughter of the king, Barbara was probably fathered either by John Churchill, later Duke of Marlborough, a second cousin of her mother, or Lord Chesterfield, whom she is said to have resembled in her features. Abel Boyer's contemporary history of the reign of Queen Anne says of Barbara:

"I do not find the King ever owned her for his daughter; but a great man now living is her reputed father. [...] It is generally believ'd that Mr. Churchill, afterwards Duke of Marlborough, was her father."

Finally, her mother's husband, Lord Castlemaine, believed Barbara to be his daughter, and bequeathed her his estate. Charles, however, always insisted on acknowledging her as his child, while disavowing her in private.

She and her mother were painted by Thomas Pooley in 1677. They are seen holding a basket of flowers; Barbara Fitzroy is portrayed as a smiling, round-faced five-year-old with blonde curls.

== Disgrace and the Monastery ==
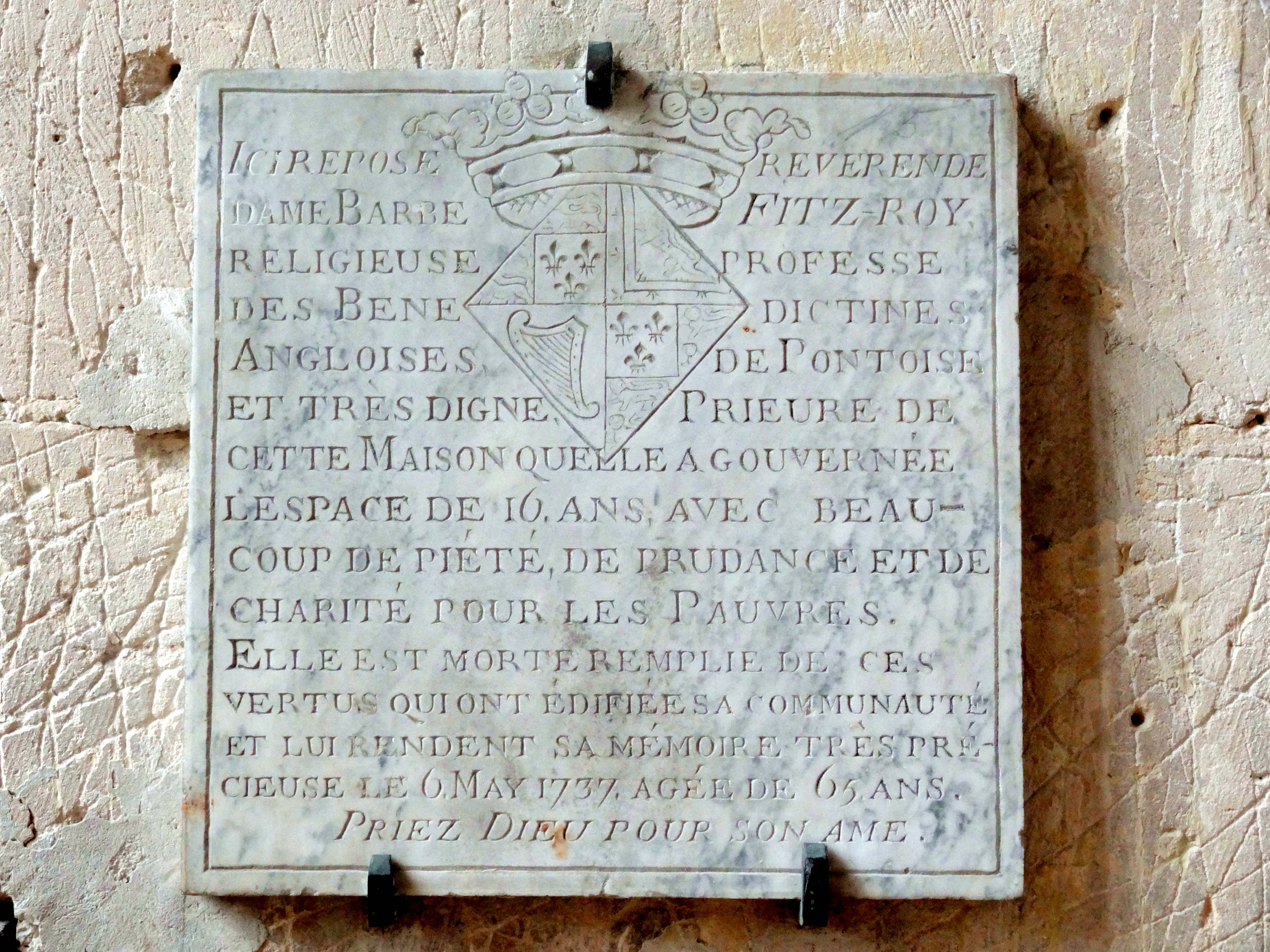
Memorial to Lady Barbara FitzRoy in Pontoise (France).

The king died in 1685. In March 1691, eighteen-year-old Barbara gave birth to the illegitimate son of the Earl of Arran, whom she named Charles Hamilton (1691–1754) who later became the Count of Arran. Charles went on to marry first Elizabeth, daughter of the Hon. John Campbell of Mamore and had a son christened William, but he died in infancy. While in France Charles Hamilton was styled Count of Arran. Elizabeth later died and Charles remarried Antoinette Courtney, daughter of Charles Courtney of Archambaud and had a son by her, Charles Hamilton who returned to England and began a military career, finally settling in Dorset. Charles on returning to England went into the Army, became a Lieutenant Colonel in the Royal Scots Greys and was created a Knight Companion of the Order of the Bath. He went on to marry Catherine, daughter of Sir Gerrard Napier, 5th Baronet of Middle March. Arran's parents bitterly opposed his relationship with Barbara. After giving birth, she became a nun in the English Priory of St. Nicholas, at Pontoise in Normandy, France, taking the name Sister Benedicta, where she later became prioress in 1721. Her son was raised by her mother, the Duchess of Cleveland, who supposedly disowned her.

An autograph of the Prioress is as follows:

Mon nom du monde est Barbe Fitz Roy est en Religion Benedite fille Du Roy De La grande Bretagne Charles 2dc j'ay fait profession dans Le Couuent des Benedictines Angloiscs De Pontoise L'annee 1691 Le 2* D'auril c'est maison est mittige.

Roughly translated as:

My name in the world is Barbe Fitz Roy, in Religion it is Benedicta, daughter of the King of Great Britain, Charles II. I made profession at the Convent of the English Benedictines in Pontoise, the year 1691, the 2nd of April. It is my place of penance.

The Lady Barbara died there in monastery on 6 May 1737, and lies buried in the church of the Priory.

== Ancestors ==
Ancestors of Lady Barbara FitzRoy

8. James I of England
4. Charles I of England
9. Anne of Denmark
2. Charles II of England
10. Henry IV of France
5. Henrietta Maria of France
11. Marie de' Medici
1. Lady Barbara FitzRoy
12. Edward Villiers
6. William Villiers, 2nd Viscount Grandison
13. Barbara St. John
3. Barbara Palmer, 1st Duchess of Cleveland
14. Paul Bayning, 1st Viscount Bayning
7. Mary Bayning
15. Anne Glemham
