= Marguerite Courtin, Madame de Vantelet =

French noblewoman

Marguerite Courtin, Madame de Vantelet (died after 1647), was a French aristocrat and courtier in service of Queen Henrietta Maria of England.

She was the only French lady-in-waiting the Queen was allowed to keep after the purging of her French household.

== Favoured lady-in-waiting ==
Both she and her husband had been with the Queen since childhood. Marguerite Courtin was the daughter of Pierre Courtin and Diane de Mary, the daughter of Jean-Ascagne de Mary. Marguerite married Jacques de Lux, Sieur de Vantelet by a marriage contract dated 7 June 1617.

According to Tanneguy II Le Veneur, Comte de Tillières (d.1652), the Queen's original Lord Chamberlain, the intention was to deprive the Queen of all her French attendants, but as she refused all food and drink unless she had at least one, they allowed her Madame de Vantelet.

Other sources credit Susan Villiers, Countess of Denbigh for the decision. When King Charles I dismissed her French retinue, the Queen asked the Countess of Denbigh to assist her in acquiring the King's consent to let Madame de Vantelet stay. The Countess succeeded in this task by asking her brother George to appeal to the King on the Queen's behalf. Susan Villiers, Countess of Denbigh was the sister of George Villiers, 1st Duke of Buckingham, the King's favourite.

The fact that the Queen, of all of her French retinue, singled out Marguerite, Madame de Vantelet, shows her importance to the Queen.

According to the French ambassador Châteauneuf in a dispatch from 1629, "the queen in her private hours enjoyed the company of the 'ladies of the Chamber', particularly Mesdames Vantelet and Coignet", while Madame de Vantelet "sleeps inside the Chamber", presumably with Queen Henrietta Maria.

== Relationship with the French and intrigues ==
Because of her closeness to the Queen, Madame de Vantelet was courted by the French, the opposing parties Marie de' Medici, the mother of Queen Henrietta Maria and Louis XIII, on the one side, and Louis XIII and Cardinal Richelieu on the other. Madame de Vantelet received a pension from the French King which ebbed and flowed with her relationship with them.

It was Madame de Vantelet who informed Marie de Médici of her daughter the English Queen's first pregnancy.

As Chamberer, Madame de Vantelet had considerable influence in filtering incoming requests and providing an audience with the Queen, brokering communication and access to Queen Henrietta Maria. The Queen's attachment to her was so strong that she survived the discovery of thirty-four letters in her own hand with her signature, found among the papers of Châteauneuf, more than implicating her in his plot against Cardinal Richelieu. Charles I, Louis XIII and the Cardinal all wanted her gone, but Queen Henrietta Maria won out.

The Ambassador Poygni parries the attack with the arguments supplied to him, but they do not meet the point. He also has instructions from his Court to demand the expulsion from this Court of the Vantelletta, favourite of the queen here, who had a hand in the intrigue carried on here in the time of the Ambassador extraordinary Castelnovo, afterwards Garde des Sceaux in France and of the Chevalier di Giar. This office is displeasing to their Majesties, and so the ambassador is beginning to be looked at askance, without any hope of being able to obtain what he asks, the king being unwilling, as Poygni was told, to order his household for the satisfaction of others.

== Flight from England with the Queen ==
When Queen Henrietta Maria had to flee England due to the Civil War, of those accompanying her to France was Marguerite de Vantelet, and Marguerite de Vantelet's husband, Seigneur de Vantelet, gentleman usher to the Queen. He had also been in her marriage entourage in 1626, and his family was long-time servants at the French court.

Madame de Vantelet on this voyage to safety, was amongst those mistaken as pirates by the local populace when they finally arrived in France:

Henrietta Maria had not in fact landed in Brest, as the sea captain had reported, but twenty-five kilometres away at L’Aber Ildut. There her first task was to persuade the locals her servants were not pirates. Her party included Henry Jermyn, the dwarf Jeffrey Hudson, Susan, the Countess of Denbigh, the Duchess of Richmond, Father Phillip, and Monsieur and Madame Vantelet, who had been with her since childhood. They made strange pirates, but the coast was regularly raided and the whole area was in arms, so they carefully raised a staff with a handkerchief on it. Henrietta Maria then explained to the locals that she was Queen of England, while looking, she recalled, more like ‛a distressed wandering princess from a romance.’

== Family ==
The marriage of their son Charles de Lux, sieur de Vantelet to Henriette Marie Coignet, in 1647, was celebrated with the Queen and her son Prince Charles, the later Charles II in attendance.

Like the Vantelet family, the Coignet family was also long-time servants at the French court. A Seigneur Coignet, another one of Henrietta Maria's gentleman ushers, also accompanied the Queen in 1644 on her perilous journey back to France. He, too, and his wife had been a part of her marriage entourage in 1626. James or Jacquet Coignet was from an old Auxerre family whose presence at court dated back to the time of Catherine de Médici. He was married to Elizabeth, the daughter of Jean Garnier, master of Queen Henrietta Maria's wardrobe, and Lady Françoise de Monbodiac, Queen Henrietta Maria’s nurse when she was young and who also followed her to England. Together, Jacques and Elizabeth Coignet were the parents of Henriette Marie Coignet, undoubtedly named for the Queen.

The younger de Vantelets were also in the employ of the Queen, and later the Dowager Queen, Henrietta Maria.

Henrietta Maria Coignet, Madame de Vantelet, was in Henrietta Maria's employ until the Dowager Queen's death in 1669, after which she and her husband, Sieur de Vantelet, received 1,000l. "as a debt acknowledged to be due to her by a paper of the handwriting of the late Queen Mother, and another 300l. to her in consideration of her pretences to the goods in the Queen Mother's Chamber."

Henrietta Maria de Vantelet, dresser to the late Queen Mother, also received an annual pension of 300l. It was granted on 28 February and 30 March 1662/3, while the Queen Dowager was still alive, and apparently still being paid as late as 9 October 1686.

The kings Charles II and James II and their mother did not always see eye to eye, but in valuing her French household they apparently agreed.

Both the Madame de Vantelets' signatures have survived on the marriage contract from 1647, signed February 20 in Paris where they celebrated the wedding together with the Queen of England, Scotland, and Ireland and the future King Charles II. After "Henriette Marie R" and "Charles P" they sign themselves "Marguerite Courtin" and "Henriette Marie/Coignet". Fellow attendant to Henrietta Maria, and mother to Henriette Marie, Madame Elizabeth Coignet also attended, signing herself "Elizabeth Garnier". Her mother, Françoise de Monbodiac, and two of her sisters, Catherine Garnier, Madame Arpe as the wife of Thomas Arpe, provider of the robes to Henrietta Maria, and Louise Garnier, Madame de Plancy as the wife of Pierre de Plancy, apothecary and valet of the Queen of England, were also present. Marguerite Courtin, Madame de Vantelet seems very much to have been in the Queen's inner circle, if not even foremost in that circle.

Henrietta Maria Coignet, Madame de Vantelet, wife of the Sieur Vantelet, mentioned in the long marriage contract of Louis Belin, King's Counselor and auditor in his Chamber of Accounts, and Henriette Marie de Plancy, daughter of the Queen's apothecary, in 1655 when they all resided in France. Which 26 signatories include Henrietta Maria and her daughter Henrietta of England. Her mother was the aunt of the above-mentioned bride Henriette Marie de Plancy.

Marguerite Courtin was the daughter Pierre Courtin (d. before 1612), Esquire, Seigneur de Hostel-du-Bois, in Brie, archer of the Ordinances of the King in 1567 and man-at-arms in 1581 and 1584. He married, by contract dated 14 January 1587, damoiselle Diane de Mary (d.1631), daughter of Jean-Ascagne de Mary, seigneur de Beaulieu, goldsmith to Henry II and Benvenuto Cellini, who talks of him in his famous autobiography, and the late Constance della Robbia, la Robie, the daughter of Girolamo della Robbia and the granddaughter of Andrea della Robbia. Diane de Mary, Madame Courtin was under-governess to the young princess Henrietta Maria from at least 19 October 1612, when the young princess was not three years old. In her testament she gives the Queen of England a gift of a small enamelled gold bracelet with a clasp of 17 diamonds and begs her to transfer to her children and grandchildren the affection that she has always shown her.

Marguerite was one of four sisters; Jeanne married Pierre Testard, Esquire, Madeleine married Jean d’Aubusson, chevalier, and Marie married Nicolas Billard, seigneur de Carouge. Marie was his widow in 1649 and founded the priory of the Bénédictines mitigées du Faubourg Saint-Victor in Paris.

Jacques le Lux, sieur de Vantelet (d. before 1647/8), was the son of Robert de Lux, one of the four butlers whom Louis XIII chose to serve every year, and whom he called the Pillars of his House, and Marie de Plaisance, who had the honour of being named by Henry IV also under-governess to the Children of France. Jacques le Lux, sieur de Vantelet had at least two siblings. His brother Louis de Lux, seigneur de Vantelet et D'Orsigny, counselor and butler to the King and Master of the Horses, married Marie Merault. Their daughter Marie married François de Brie-Serrant, and were the ancestors of Alexandre de Brie-Serrant. His sister Françoise de Lux married Charles du Bernetz (d. before 1647/8), seigneur des Arpentis, butler his royal highness.

Jacques le Lux, sieur de Vantelet was dead before the signing of his son's marriage contract on 20 February 1647/8, when Marguerite is his veuve; widow.

The elder de Vantelets had at least three children. Children of Jacques de Lux, sieur de Vantelet and Marguerite Courtin, Madame Vantelet:

- Charles de Lux, sieur de Vantelet, who married Henrietta Maria Coignet by marriage contract dated 20 February 1647/8
- Jeanne de Lux, who married Jean-Baptiste de Mezières de Lepervanche, councilor and butler of the King, residing in Boisset-les-Prévanches, by marriage contract dated 6 June 1653, in the presence in particular of Charles II of England, of the Queen Mother Henrietta Marie of France, and of Jacques Duke of York. Jane l’Espervanche is granted a pension at the same time as the younger Madame de Vantelet. Henry de Mésiéres, Chevalier and Seigneur de l’Espervanche, son of deceased Jean de Mésiéres, Seigneur of the same, and of Jeanne de Lux, married Damoiselle Marie de Trevet by marriage contract of Monday 16 October 1684.
- Christina de Vantelet, who Thomas Amaulry in 1684 in Mercure galant, dédié à Monseigneur le Dauphin triumphantly declares married the Comte de Schelay, "which is one of the best houses in England". This "Comte de Schelay" was Sir William Shelley, the son of Sir John Shelley, 1st Baronet of Michelgrove. Sir William died in his father's lifetime. By him Christina was the mother of Sir Charles Shelley, 2nd Baronet, and ancestress of all subsequent Shelley baronets of Michelgrove. A descendant, Henrietta Shelley, married George Onslow, 1st Earl of Onslow, making her the ancestress of the later Earls of Onslow, as well. Both titles are still extant.
