= Margaret Feilding, Duchess of Hamilton =

17th-century Scottish noblewoman

Lady Margaret Feilding, Duchess of Hamilton
- Duchess of Hamilton
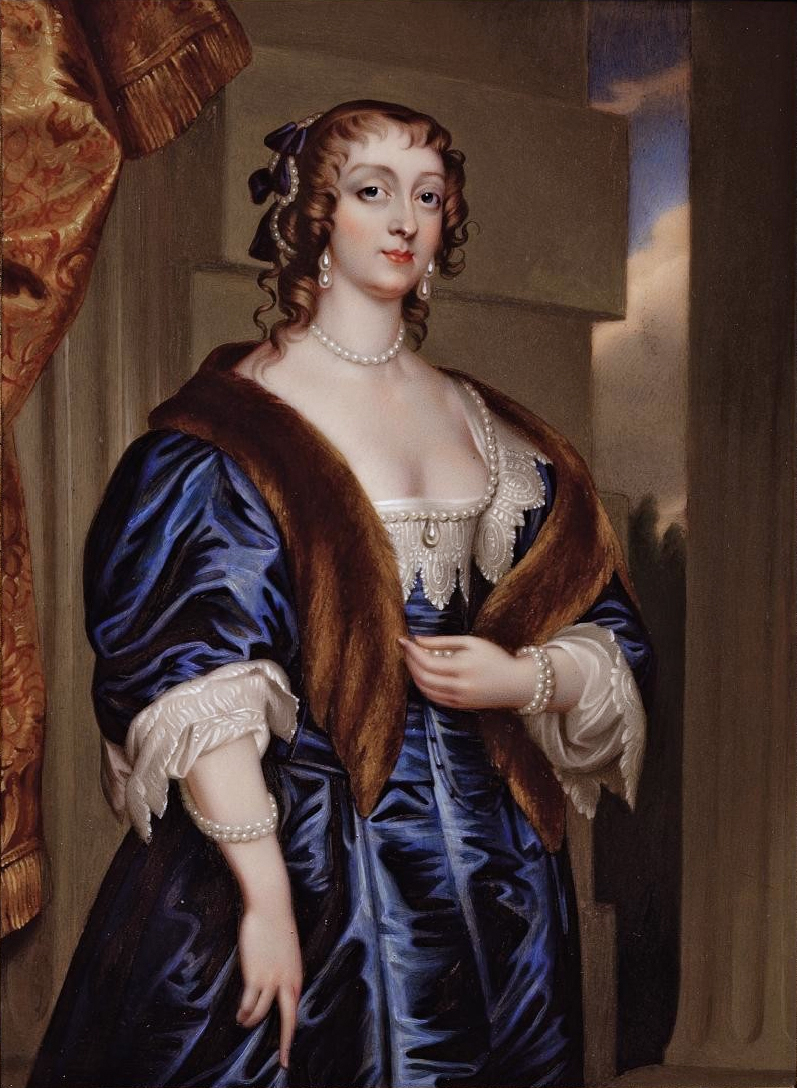
- Portrait, 1839
- Other titles: Marchioness of Hamilton, Countess of Arran
- Born: 1613
- Died: 10 May 1638 (aged 24–25); London
- Buried: Westminster Abbey
- Spouse: James Hamilton, 1st Duke of Hamilton
- Issue: Anne Hamilton, 3rd Duchess of Hamilton; Susannah Kennedy, Countess of Cassillis; Four children who died in infancy
- Father: William Feilding, 1st Earl of Denbigh
- Mother: Susan Villiers

Margaret (Mary) Feilding (1613–1638) was a Scottish noblewoman, wife of Duke James Hamilton, and courtier of Queen Consort Henrietta Maria.

== Biography ==
Margaret was born around 1613 to William Feilding, 1st Earl of Denbigh, and Susan Villiers, sister of the Duke of Buckingham George Villiers. In 1620, she married 14-year-old James Hamilton, the future Duke of Hamilton. Following the marriage, she was briefly styled as the Countess of Arran, which was changed to Marchioness of Hamilton in 1625. Margaret was a courtier of Queen Consort Henrietta Maria, holding the office of Lady of the Bedchamber which granted her close contact with both the queen and king. She had three sons, all of whom who died young, and three daughters. One died young, but Anne and Susanna, Countess of Cassillis, survived their mother.

Margaret died at the Wallingford House in London on 10 May 1638. She was buried at Westminster Abbey on 12 May.

== Legacy ==
The contemporary Scottish historian Gilbert Burnet described Margaret as "a lady of great and singular worth" in his book Lives of the Hamiltons. Edmund Waller wrote the poem Thyrsis, Galatea in praise of Margaret.
