= Lord William Hamilton =

Member of Parliament for Lanarkshire
- In office 16 May 1734 – 11 July 1734
- Preceded by: Lord Archibald Hamilton
- Succeeded by: Sir James Hamilton of Rosehall

Personal details
- Born: c. 1705
- Died: 11 July 1734 (aged 27–28) Pall Mall, London
- Spouse: Frances Hawes
- Parent(s): James Hamilton, 4th Duke of Hamilton; Elizabeth Gerard

Lord William Hamilton (c. 1706 – 11 July 1734) was a member of Parliament for Lanarkshire.

== Early life ==
Lord William was the second oldest child of James Hamilton, 4th Duke of Hamilton, and his second wife Elizabeth (née Gerard). When the 4th Duke died in a duel, Lord William's eldest brother James succeeded to the dukedom and became the head of the Jacobite interest in Scotland. In 1726, it was rumoured that Lord William would be given a troop of horse, when King George I recalled the Duke of Hamilton from Rome, where he had been seeing the Old Pretender.

== Marriage ==
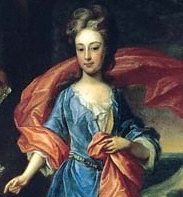
Lady William Hamilton

Early in 1733, the already married Countess of Hertford became infatuated with Lord William and addressed a love poem to him, but he never responded; instead, Lady Mary Wortley Montagu and the Baroness De La Warr conspired to write a poem on his behalf to reject Lady Hertford. In May that year, he eloped with the beautiful but impoverished Frances Hawes, daughter of a stockbroker who lost all his fortune due to the South Sea Sufferer's Act 1721, without the duke's knowledge, having been led to believe he was marrying an heiress. The couple hurried to consummate the marriage to make it legally binding, fearing that her father might try to have it annulled, and it turned out to be a love match. Lord William was appointed Vice-Chamberlain to the queen, Caroline of Ansbach, the same year. As the second son, he was himself poor enough for Queen Caroline to refer to him and his wife as "handsome beggars". The couple had a stillborn child.

Lord William returned to Lanarkshire to represent his eldest brother's interests and became member of Parliament on 16 May 1734, succeeding his uncle Archibald, but fell ill in June and died at his house in Pall Mall, London, on 11 July. His widow was soon pressured to remarry, becoming Viscountess Vane. In her scandalous memoirs, she describes her grief over the loss of her first husband, which was ridiculed by Horace Walpole.

Parliament of Great Britain
| Preceded by Lord Archibald Hamilton | Member of Parliament for Lanarkshire; 1734 | Succeeded by Sir James Hamilton of Rosehall |
