= Frances Vane, Viscountess Vane =

British memoirist (1715–1788)

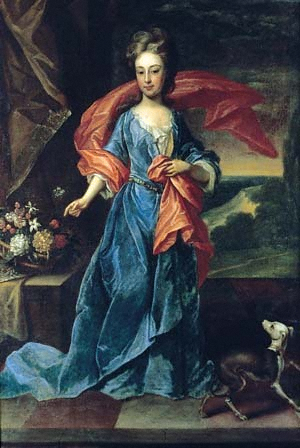
The Viscountess Vane

Frances Anne Vane, Viscountess Vane (formerly Hamilton, née Hawes; c. January 1715 – 31 March 1788), was a British memoirist known for her highly public adulterous relationships.

== Early life and first marriage ==
Frances Anne Hawes was the daughter of Susanna and Francis Hawes, and probably born in Winchester Street, London. She was baptised on 14 January 1715 at St Peter le Poer. Her father, a stockbroker and clerk to the Treasurer of the Navy, became quite wealthy, and was appointed director of the South Sea Company in February 1715. However, he lost most of his fortune as a result of the South Sea Sufferer's Act 1721, following the failed attempt to inflate the price of the South Sea Company's stock. Thus, the future Viscountess Vane grew up in a family plagued by financial problems and could expect little or no dowry.

Described as the best minuet dancer in England, she was good-looking and vivacious enough to attract the attention of the 4th Duke of Hamilton's second son, Lord William Hamilton. Her father tried to prevent their relationship, but the couple eloped in May 1733, and Frances Hawes became known as Lady William Hamilton. The couple hurried to consummate the marriage to make it legally binding, fearing that her father might try to have it annulled.

Lord William served as Vice-Chamberlain to Caroline of Ansbach but, as the second son, was himself poor enough for the queen to refer to the couple as "handsome beggars". The marriage was short-lived; Lady William was widowed on 11 July next year, shortly after delivering a stillborn child.

== Second marriage ==
Frances Vane, Viscountess Vane, as 'Winter', watchpaper pub by Robert Sayer (1775 cat no 29) (British Museum)

Lady William was soon pressured by her family, in-laws, and friends to accept the marriage proposal from William Vane, 2nd Viscount Vane. The couple married on 19 May 1735 in Marylebone, and Lady William thus became Viscountess Vane.

The union became notoriously unhappy. Lady Vane openly despised the man who adored her, frequently ran away and tried to procure a legal separation. During the couple's visit to Paris in 1736, she fled with the 1st Earl Ferrers's sixth surviving son, Sewallis Shirley. Shirley and Lady Vane lived together in Brussels from 1736 until 1738. Her husband desperately tried to persuade her to return, paying people to search for her and promising a reward in the newspapers for any information about her location in January 1737. Lady Vane was not amused by his efforts.

When Shirley left her, she embarked on a liaison with Augustus Berkeley, 4th Earl of Berkeley. The relationship with Lord Berkeley ended in 1741, when she accepted her husband's offer of an income and a separate household. Lord Vane and the society believed that her other lovers included Walpole's rival Sir Thomas Aston, 4th Baronet, and Hugh Fortescue, 1st Earl Fortescue, but Lady Vane denied the allegations and insisted they were her friends.

== Memoirs of a Lady of Quality ==
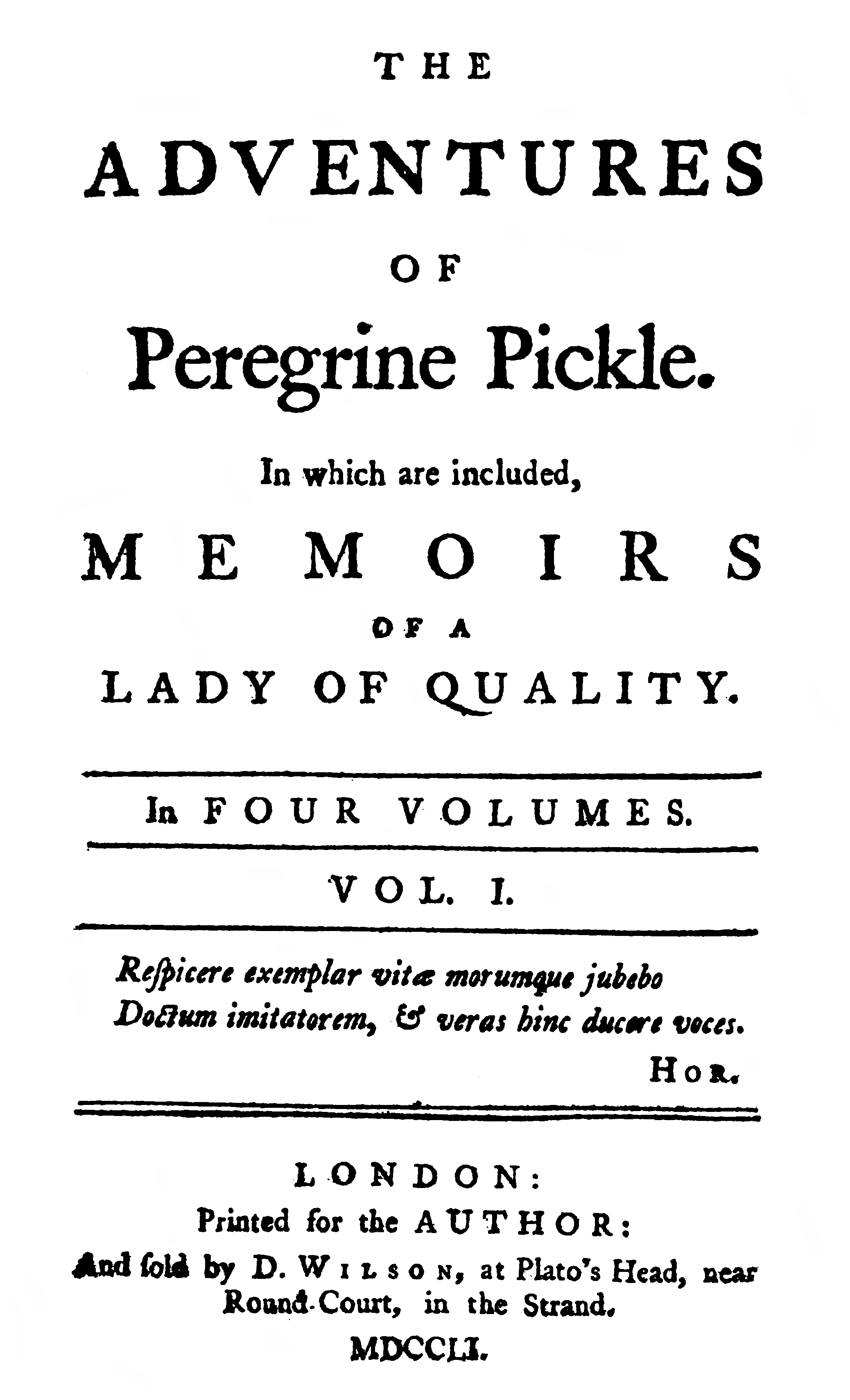
Title page of the first edition of The Adventures of Peregrine Pickle

In 1751, Tobias Smollett included the Memoirs of a Lady of Quality in his novel The Adventures of Peregrine Pickle. Though the memoirs, written in amatory fiction, were published anonymously and revised for publication by John Shebbeare, it was clear from the beginning that the "lady of quality" was Lady Vane. Horace Walpole wrote in a letter the same year:

My Lady Vane has literally published the memoirs of her own life, only suppressing part of her lovers, no part of the success of the others with her: a degree of profligacy not to be accounted for; she does not want money, none of her stallions will raise her credit; and the number, all she had to brag of, concealed!

In her memoirs, the Viscountess Vane mocks contemporary social and moral conventions, and describes her emotional devastation following the death of her first husband. Walpole gossiped in the same letter:

Lady Townshend told me that when [Lady Vane's] first husband Lord William Hamilton died, she said that she had no comfort but in the Blessed Sacrament—though at the same time she lay with an hundred other men. I said, that was not extraordinary; it was what she meant by the Sacrament—the receiving the body and blood.

Like Lady Townshend, Lady Vane shocked society not only by refusing to portray herself as chaste, but also by unrepentantly advertising her adulterous relationships. In 1751, Samuel Richardson referred to her and other scandalous memoirists as "a Set of Wretches, wishing to perpetuate their Infamy". Lady Mary Wortley Montagu's reaction to the memoirs was more careful and restrained. In a 1752 letter to her daughter, the Countess of Bute, she wrote: "[Lady Vane's] History, rightly considered, would be more instructive to young Women than any Sermon I know. They may see there the mortifications and variety of misery are the unavoidable consequences of Galantrys."

== Later life and death ==
After the publication of her memoirs, Lady Vane spent most of her time in Bath, Somerset. Her erratic lifestyle soon ruined her husband's finances. Struck by an illness, she was bedridden for the last 20 years of her life. During that time, she contemplated converting to Roman Catholicism. She died childless on 31 March 1788 at her home in Hill Street, Mayfair, London, and was buried in the Vane family vault in Shipborne, Kent. Lord Vane, who had remained faithful to her despite the social humiliation caused by her sexual adventures, died the next year.
