= Walter Aston (MP for Staffordshire) =

English politician

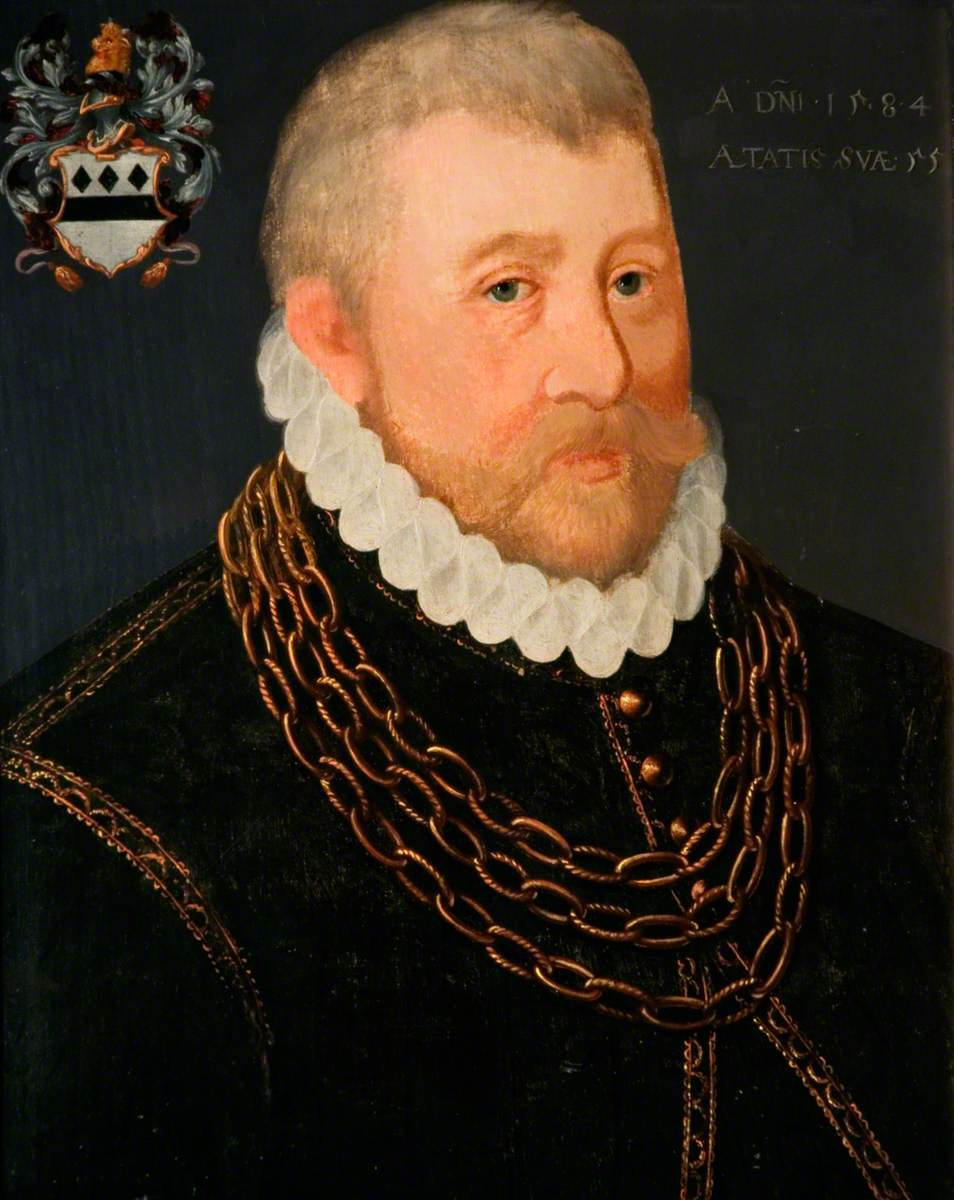
Sir Walter Aston of Tixall (1530–1589)

Sir Walter Aston, DL, JP (1 October 1530 – 1589), of Tixall and Heywood, Staffordshire, was a Knight of the Shire and Sheriff of Staffordshire.

== Biography ==
Walter Aston was born on 1 October 1530. He was the first son of Sir Edward Aston of Tixall and Heywood and his second wife, Jane, the daughter of Sir Thomas Bowles of Penhow Castle, Monmouthshire. He succeeded to his father's estates on 8 September 1568.

Aston was a Knight of the Shire for the constituency of Staffordshire in the Parliament of March 1553 for 31 days—this was his only parliamentary experience. He was knighted on 18 July 1560 by the 4th Duke of Norfolk for his service at the siege of Leith in that year. He was Sheriff of Staffordshire twice for a year starting in 1570 and again in 1580. He was Justice of the Peace twice by 1574 – 1575 and again from 1577 until his death in 1589. He was commissioner of the (military) muster in 1586 (the year following the Spanish Armada). He was also Deputy Lieutenant of Staffordshire by 1586.

== Family ==
Aston's first marriage was in 1544 to Mary, daughter of Sir John Spencer of Althorp, Northamptonshire and Wormleighton Manor, Warwickshire; and secondly, by 1551, to Elizabeth, daughter of James Leveson of Lilleshall, Shropshire. Aston and Elizabeth had six sons and six daughters among whom were:

- Edward (died 1598), his heir, whose estates in the counties of Staffordshire, Derbyshire and Leicestershire produced an annual £10,000 income, married twice. Firstly Mary, third daughter of Sir John Spencer of Althorp, who died childless, and secondly Anne only daughter of Sir Thomas Lucy, of Charlecote, Warwickshire. They had five daughters and three sons including his heir Walter who would become 1st Lord Aston.
- Robert, of Parkhall, who married Jocosa, 2nd daughter of William Dallyson, one of the Judges of the King's Bench, and had three sons, William, Robert, and John, of whom William left an only child, Frances, his sole heir, who, 28 April. 1647, married John Whitehall, into whose family she carried the estate of Parkhall. Robert died without issue. John married Margery Walton and was the father of the distinguished judge Sir William Aston, who founded the Irish branch of the family.
- Richard (died 1610), who died before his father.
- William, of Millwich, ancestor of the present Lord Aston.
- Hastings, who died unmarried.
- Devereux, who died unmarried.
- Joan, who married William Crompton, of Stone, in Staffordshire.
- Mary, who married Thomas Astley, of Pattershall.
- Eleanor (d. 1636), who married William Peyto of Chesterton, Warwickshire, and was the mother of Edward Peyto.
- Elizabeth, who married Basil Feilding, of Newnham, and was mother of William Feilding, 1st Earl of Denbigh.
- Catherine, who married Stephen, son and heir of Sir Stephen Slaney, Lord Mayor of London.
