= Anne Hamilton, 3rd Duchess of Hamilton =

Scottish peeress (1632–1716)

Her Grace The Duchess of Hamilton
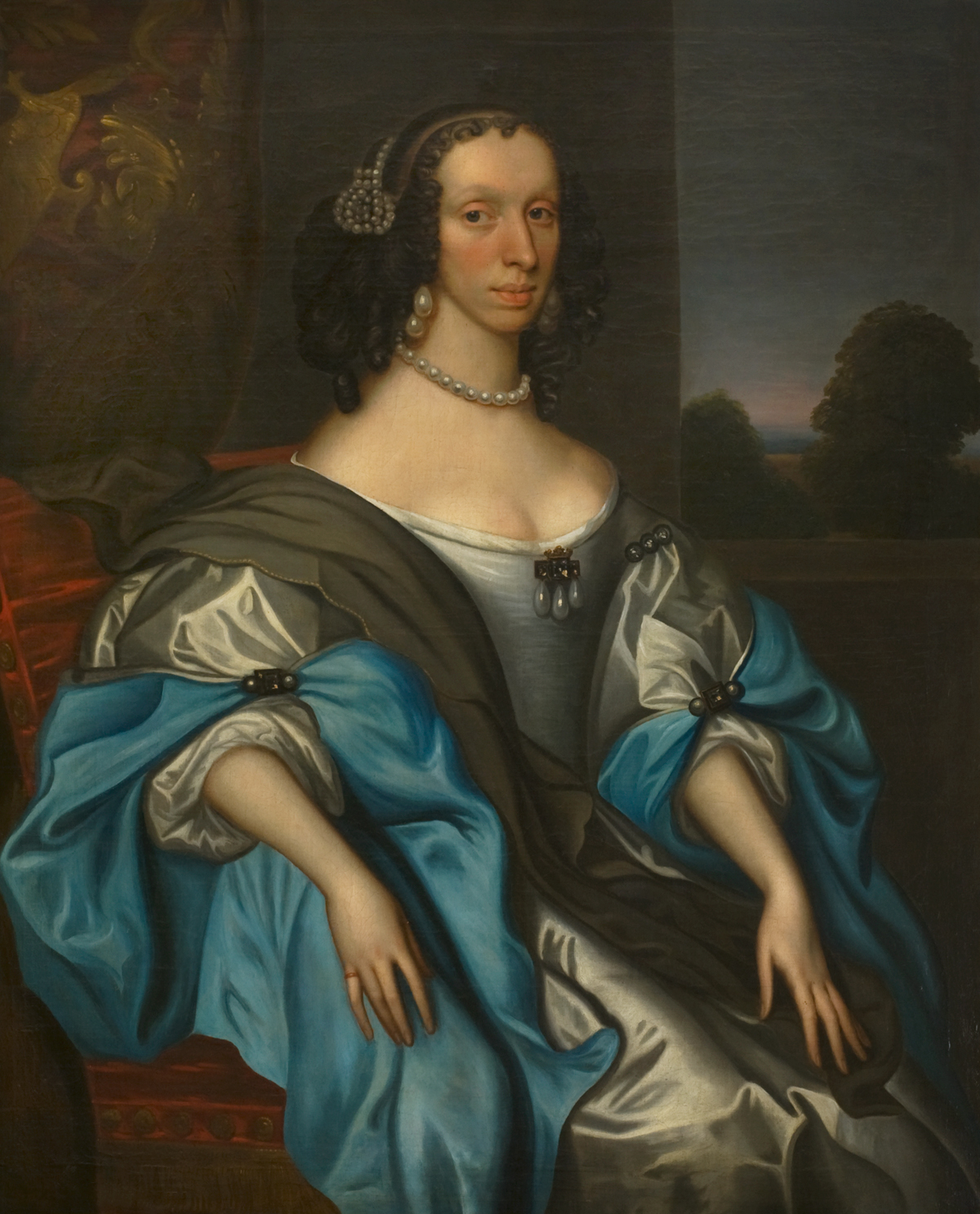
- Portrait by David Scougall

Duchess of Hamilton
- Tenure: 1651–1698
- Predecessor: William Hamilton
- Successor: James Hamilton
- Other titles: Marchioness of Clydesdale; Countess of Lanark; Countess of Arran and Cambridge; Lady of Aven and Innerdale
- Born: 6 January 1632; Palace of Whitehall, London, England
- Died: 17 October 1716 (aged 84); Hamilton Palace, Lanarkshire, Scotland
- Buried: Bent Cemetery, Hamilton
- Noble family: House of Hamilton
- Spouse: William Douglas, 1st Earl of Selkirk
- Issue: Lady Mary Hamilton; James Hamilton, 4th Duke of Hamilton; Lord William Hamilton; Lady Anna Hamilton; Catherine Murray, Duchess of Atholl; Charles Douglas, 2nd Earl of Selkirk; John Hamilton, 3rd Earl of Selkirk; George Hamilton, 1st Earl of Orkney; Susan Hay, Marchioness of Tweeddale; Margaret Maule, Countess of Panmure; Lady Anna Hamilton; Lord Basil Hamilton; Lord Archibald Hamilton
- Father: James Hamilton, 1st Duke of Hamilton
- Mother: Lady Mary Feilding

Anne Hamilton, 3rd Duchess of Hamilton (6 January 1632 – 17 October 1716) was a Scottish peeress.

The daughter of James Hamilton, 1st Duke of Hamilton and 3rd Marquess of Hamilton, Scottish General and premier peer of the realm, and Lady Mary Feilding, daughter of William Feilding, 1st Earl of Denbigh, and his wife, the former Lady Susan Villiers, a sister of George Villiers, 1st Duke of Buckingham.

She was born at the Palace of Whitehall in London, where her mother was a Lady of the Bedchamber to Henrietta Maria of France, wife of King Charles I.

Her name is found as a shareholder in "A List of the Names of the Adventurers in the Bank of Scotland, February 4, 1697". Holding shares worth £8000 Scots, she was entitled to be elected as Governor.

== Accession ==
Following the 1st Duke's execution for his part in the Wars of the Three Kingdoms in 1649, his brother, William, Earl of Lanark, inherited the titles and lands. William died from wounds received at the Battle of Worcester in 1651, whilst leading his regiment into some of the thickest of the fighting. In his will made at The Hague in 1650, he stipulated that the Lady Anne was his heir, over and above his own children, (all daughters, his only son having died in childhood).

Lady Anne became the Duchess of Hamilton, with the subsidiary titles Marchioness of Clydesdale, Countess of Arran, Lanark and Cambridge, the Lady Aven, Innerdale, Machanshire and Polmont. She succeeded to the dukedom of Hamilton thanks to a remainder that stipulated, the dukedom should devolve upon his brother and male heirs, and that the eldest daughter of the 1st Duke should succeed to the dukedom only if her uncle died leaving no sons.

Through paternal descent, Anne had a claim to the throne of Scotland, although this was dependent upon the failure of the House of Stuart. She was descended from James II through the marriage of the 1st Lord Hamilton to James's daughter Mary. Her great-great-grandfather, the 2nd Earl of Arran, had been heir presumptive from the death of Regent Albany until the birth of James VI, and had served as regent of Scotland during the childhood and absence in France of Mary, Queen of Scots.

== Marriage and issue ==
She was wed in 1656, at the kirk of Corstorphine near Edinburgh, to William Douglas, 1st Earl of Selkirk, a younger son of William Douglas, 1st Marquess of Douglas. Selkirk was created Duke of Hamilton for his lifetime, included the subsidiary titles pertaining to the Dukedom jure uxoris, and in 1660 he assumed the surname Hamilton. Between 1657 and 1673, the couple produced 13 children:

- Lady Mary Hamilton (1657–1666)
- James Hamilton, 4th Duke of Hamilton (1658–1712), until 1698 he was styled as Earl of Arran
- Lord William Hamilton (1659–1681)
- Lady Anna Hamilton (1661–1663)
- Lady Catherine Hamilton (1662–1707), married John Murray, 1st Duke of Atholl
- Lord Charles Hamilton (1664–1739), later 2nd Earl of Selkirk
- Lord John Hamilton (1665–1744), later 1st Earl of Ruglen and 3rd Earl of Selkirk
- Field Marshal Lord George Hamilton (1666–1737), later 1st Earl of Orkney
- Lady Susan Hamilton, married firstly John Cochrane, 2nd Earl of Dundonald; married secondly John Hay, 3rd Marquess of Tweeddale
- Lady Margaret Hamilton (1668–1731), married James Maule, 4th Earl of Panmure
- Lady Anna Hamilton (b. 1669), died in infancy
- Lord Basil Hamilton (1671–1701)
- Lord Archibald Hamilton (1673–1754)

James, Earl of Arran's father died in 1694, and in July 1698 his mother resigned all her titles into the hand of King William, who regranted them to Arran a month later in a charter signed at Het Loo, Netherlands. He was conferred with the titles: Duke of Hamilton, Marquess of Clydesdale, Earl of Arran, Earl of Lanark, Earl of Cambridge, Lord Aven, Polmont, Machansyre, and Innerdale. This regrant of title was presumably because of the loyalty of Arran's parents to the King, as his own affection to the House of Orange was questionable due to his suspected Jacobitism. The Duchess died at Hamilton on 17 October 1716, and is buried there, in the Bent Cemetery.

== Building works ==
After her marriage, the Duchess and her husband set about laying the foundations for what would be, under later Dukes, the largest private residence in the western hemisphere, Hamilton Palace.

This was constructed on the site of what was commonly called either the 'Palace' or 'The Orchard', a courtyard style building in the Low Parks of Hamilton. The Hamiltons had lived in the Low Parks, the more formal area of their estate in the Clyde valley, since the fourteenth century.

In 1684 she commissioned the architect, James Smith to remodel the existing buildings, removing the southern part of the previous courtyard building on the site and increasing the scale of the edifice to form a U-shaped mansion house.

Today, the palace is no more, and the Low Parks now form part of Strathclyde Park, having been given to the nation in lieu of death duties upon the passing of the 14th Duke in 1973.

Another of the Duchess's works was the building of a new school building to house the Grammar School of Hamilton (in 1848 renamed the Hamilton Academy) which had originally been endowed in 1588 by her great-grandfather John Hamilton, 1st Marquess of Hamilton and sited near the churchyard adjoining Hamilton Palace. In 1714 the Duchess presented this new school building on the newly named Grammar School Square to the Town Council of Hamilton. The building remained in the school's use until 1848 when, as now the Hamilton Academy, the school relocated to a further purpose-built building. Duchess Anne's building of 1714 was demolished in 1932; a plaque commemorating the site was subsequently erected by Hamilton Civic Society, the Hamilton family continuing as benefactors of the school (see article Hamilton Academy).

Peerage of Scotland
Preceded by William Hamilton	Duchess of Hamilton; 1651–1698	Succeeded by James Hamilton
