= Susan Feilding, Countess of Denbigh =

English courtier (1583–1652)

Susan Feilding
- Countess of Denbigh
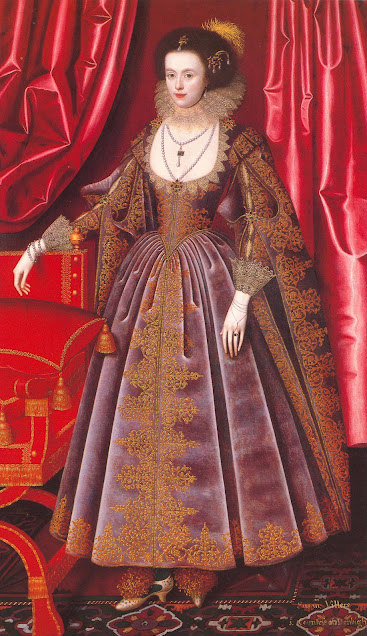
- Born: Susan Villiers; 1583; Brooksby, Leicestershire, England
- Died: 1652 (aged 68–69); Paris, France
- Buried: Saint-Eustache, Paris
- Noble family: Villiers
- Spouse: William Feilding, 1st Earl of Denbigh
- Issue: Basil Feilding, 2nd Earl of Denbigh; George Feilding, 1st Earl of Desmond; Margaret Feilding, Duchess of Hamilton; Lady Anne Noel; Elizabeth Boyle, Countess of Guilford
- Father: Sir George Villiers
- Mother: Mary Villiers, Countess of Buckingham
- Occupation: First Lady of the Bedchamber to Queen Henrietta Maria

Susan Feilding, Countess of Denbigh (née Villiers; 1583–1652) was an English courtier. She was First Lady of the Bedchamber to Queen Henrietta Maria from 1626 until her death in 1652.

== Life ==
Born Susan Villiers, she was the youngest daughter of Sir George Villiers and Mary Beaumont, his second wife. About 1607, she married Sir William Feilding, who was later created Earl of Denbigh. The Countess of Denbigh was often at court. She rode out hunting with King James and her mother, the Countess of Buckingham, on 19 June 1624 (the King's birthday) from Wanstead House.

She was appointed First Lady of the Bedchamber to the queen, Henrietta Maria, in 1626, and kept this office for the rest of her life. She was appointed in the midst of the king's purge of the queen's French household. Initially, the queen refused her because she was Protestant. When the king dismissed her French retinue, however, she asked Denbigh to assist her in acquiring the king's consent to let her French nurse Madame de Vantelet stay. Denbigh succeeded in this task by asking her brother to appeal to the king on the queen's behalf, after which the queen voluntarily agreed for her to become her principal lady-in-waiting. As principal lady-in-waiting, she has been referred to as both Mistress of the Robes as well as First Lady of the Bedchamber.

During the English Civil War, her husband, the Earl of Denbigh, supported and fought for King Charles I of England, while her son, Basil, joined the Parliamentarian forces. The Earl was wounded during an attack on Birmingham and died of his injuries in 1643. The next year Susan fled to France with Queen Henrietta Marie.

It was in France that Susan converted to Roman Catholicism, and in 1651, the council of state ordered the sequestration of all her property in England on the grounds that she had become Papist and was active in designs against the state. She was the patron of Richard Crashaw, who dedicated his sacred poems to her, in hearty acknowledgment of his immortal obligation to her goodness and charity, and addressed to her a poem persuading her — to render herself without further delay into the communion of the Catholic Church.

The Countess died while in France, in 1652, and was buried in Église Saint-Eustache, Paris.

== Issue ==
The Countess of Denbigh had five children:

- Basil Feilding, 2nd Earl of Denbigh (ca. 1608–1675)
- George Feilding, 1st Earl of Desmond (ca. 1614–1665)
- Lady Margaret Feilding, Duchess of Hamilton (1613–1638), married James Hamilton, 1st Duke of Hamilton.
- Lady Anne Feilding (died 1636), married Baptist Noel, 3rd Viscount Campden
- Lady Elizabeth Feilding, Countess of Guildford (died 1667), married Lewis Boyle, 1st Viscount Boyle.

== Popular culture ==
In 2023, Susan Feilding is portrayed by Alice Grant in Mary & George, a British historical drama television miniseries created by D. C. Moore and directed by Oliver Hermanus, based on Benjamin Woolley's non-fiction book The King's Assassin (2017).

== See also ==
- Villiers family

Court offices
Preceded by Audrey Walsingham	Mistress of the Robes to Queen Henrietta Maria; 1626–1652	Succeeded by Elizabeth Fielding Boyle, Countess of Guilford
