= William Feilding, 1st Earl of Denbigh =

English courtier and peer (1587–1643)

The Right Honourable William Feilding 1st Earl of Denbigh
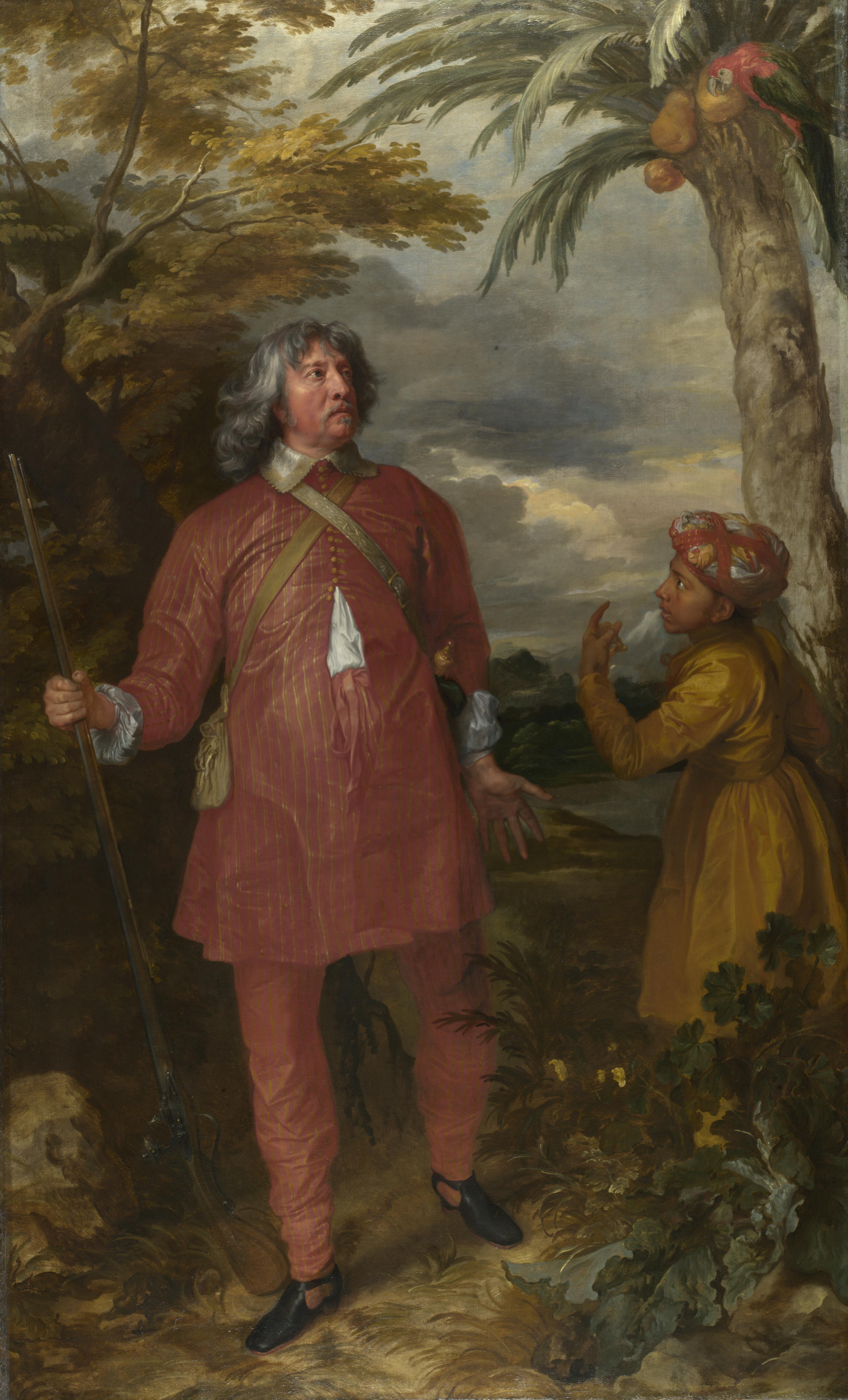
- A 1631 portrait of Denbigh by Anthony van Dyck, depicting him in India with an Indian attendant

Personal details
- Born: William Feilding; 1587
- Died: 8 April 1643 (aged 55–56)
- Resting place: Monks Kirby, Warwickshire
- Spouse: Susan Villiers (m. 1606)
- Children: Basil Feilding, 2nd Earl of Denbigh; George Feilding, 1st Earl of Desmond; Margaret Feilding, Duchess of Hamilton; Anne Feilding, Viscountess Campden; Elizabeth Boyle, Countess of Guilford; Lady Henrietta Marie Feilding
- Parents: Basil Feilding; Elizabeth Aston
- Education: Emmanuel College, Cambridge
- Title: Earl of Denbigh
- Tenure: 14 September 1622 – 8 April 1643
- Successor: Basil Feilding, 2nd Earl of Denbigh

William Feilding, 1st Earl of Denbigh (c. 1587 – 8 April 1643) was an English courtier and peer who served as the Custos Rotulorum of Warwickshire from 1628 to 1643. As the brother-in-law of George Villiers, 1st Duke of Buckingham, the royal favourite of James VI and I, he became involved in several major events during the Stuart period. He also made an unusual non-official journey to Persia and India.

== Biography ==
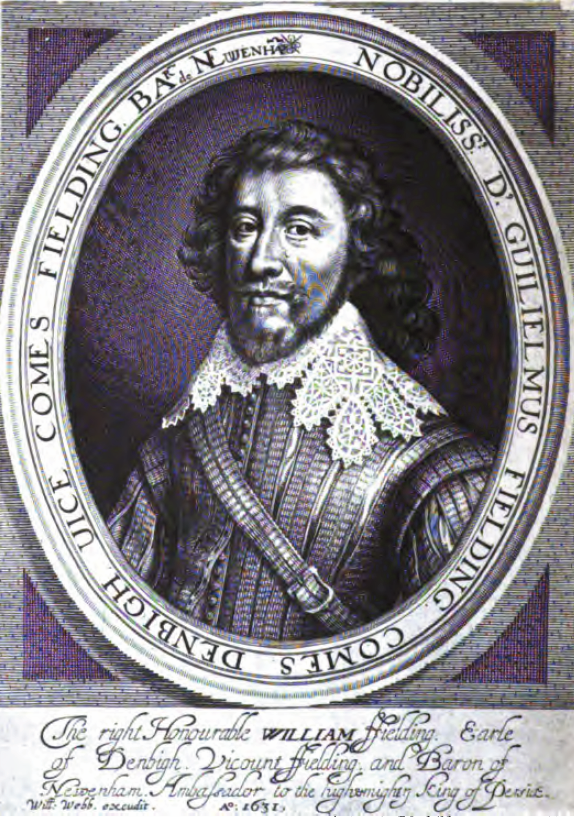
1631 portrait of Feilding

William Feilding was the son of Basil Feilding, of Newnham Paddox, Warwickshire (High Sheriff of Warwickshire in 1612), and Elizabeth Aston, daughter of Sir Walter Aston. He matriculated at Emmanuel College, Cambridge in 1603 and was knighted on 4 March 1607.

=== Ally of the Duke of Buckingham ===
In 1606, Feilding married Susan Villiers, daughter of Sir George Villiers. From around 1615, Susan's brother, George Villiers, became the favourite and self-described lover of King James I; George rose rapidly in status and influence and was made Duke of Buckingham in 1623. With the rise of Villiers, both Feilding and his wife received various offices and dignities. The historian S.R. Gardiner, in the 19th century, described Feilding as "the plain country gentleman who had the good luck to marry Buckingham's sister in the days of her poverty."

Feilding was created Baron and Viscount Feilding in 1620. Two years later he was appointed Master of the Great Wardrobe and Custos Rotulorum of Warwickshire and Earl of Denbigh on 14 September 1622.

Denbigh played a leading role in a number of failed political and military interventions in Europe that had been initiated by Buckingham. In 1623, Denbigh attended the Prince of Wales (the future Charles I) and Buckingham on the Spanish adventure, a failed attempt to persuade the Infanta of Spain to marry the Prince. In 1625, Denbigh served as admiral in the unsuccessful Cadiz Expedition. In 1628, Denbigh commanded the second naval attempt to relieve the Siege of Rochelle but returned to Portsmouth without engagement, as Denbigh said that he had no commission to hazard the king's ships in a fight. On his return to England, Denbigh's sixteen ships encountered off Cherbourg on 21 June 1628 (N.S.) a squadron of French ships under Francois Le Tellier de La Luthumière, Governor of Cherbourg; three English ships were burnt and four captured by the French.

In 1628, Denbigh became a member of the Council of war.

=== Journey to the East ===
In 1631, Lord Denbigh travelled to the East with the intention of visiting the Moghul court in India and the Safavid court in Persia. His desire was "to see those countries" – a highly unusual endeavour for a man of his status and age (Denbigh was at that time over 50 years old).

I have obtained leave from the King to make a voyage in the East India ship (as a volunteer) to the King of Persia and the Great Mogul; in which voyage I hope to better my understanding and not impeach my estate. These doings, I have thought better to undertake than to live at home, get nothing, and spend all...

— A letter from Lord Denbigh to his eldest son

Though he had elaborately decorated letters of recommendation from the King, Denbigh did not travel as an official ambassador and journeyed with only six servants: the East India Company were unenthusiastic about their aristocratic passenger. With his unimpressive retinue, Denbigh was treated with disdain by the Moghul Governor of Surat who refused to meet him or to provide a horse: he presumably travelled on to meet the Moghul Emperor Shah Jahan in a bullock cart of an ordinary merchant caravan. It seems Denbigh did meet Shah Jahan but he was unable to meet the Shah of Persia: Feilding's boat docked for only 5 weeks in the south of Persia which would have not allowed time for a journey to the royal court at Isfahan and, anyway, the Shah was on military campaign. Academic Jean McIntyre reports different accounts of the gains Denbigh might have made on his travels: she reports James Howell as stating that “The Lo; Denbigh is returned from ye great Mogor full of jewells" though Denbigh himself stated he brought back only a small piece of cloth and an old coat.

=== Later life and the Civil War ===
In 1633, Denbigh was made a member of the Council of Wales and the Marches.

On 6 July 1641, a barge carrying Feilding, his daughter Elizabeth, Lady Kinalmeaky, Lady Cornwallis, and Anne Kirke capsized while shooting the rapids at London Bridge. Kirke was drowned but the other passengers were rescued.

On the outbreak of the English Civil War in 1642, Denbigh served as a Cavalier under Prince Rupert of the Rhine and was present at the Battle of Edgehill. On 3 April 1643, during Rupert's attack on Birmingham, he was wounded and died from the effects on the 8 April 1643, being buried at Monks Kirby in Warwickshire. His brother, Edward Feilding, who also served in the Royalist army, was killed at the second battle of Newbury the following year. Lord Denbigh's courage, unselfishness and devotion to duty are much praised by Edward Hyde, Earl of Clarendon.

== Family ==
Feilding arms

Sir William and his wife, Susan Villiers, had six children:

- Basil Feilding, 2nd Earl of Denbigh (c. 1608–1675)
- George Feilding, 1st Earl of Desmond (c. 1614–1665)
- Lady Mary Feilding (1613–1638), married James Hamilton, 1st Duke of Hamilton.
- Lady Anne Feilding (died 1636), married Baptist Noel, 3rd Viscount Campden
- Elizabeth Feilding, Countess of Guildford (died 1667), married Lewis Boyle, 1st Viscount Boyle.
- Lady Henrietta Marie Feilding (died young)

In 1632, Feilding's daughters Mary and Anne, and his niece Goditha Arden, a maid of honour, joined Henrietta Maria to perform in the court masque The Shepherd's Paradise.

His daughter, Lady Mary Feilding (1613–1638), also known as Margaret, was married to James Hamilton, 1st Duke of Hamilton, one of the heirs to the throne of Scotland after the descendants of James VI (James I of England). Her portrait was painted by Anthony van Dyck and Henry Pierce Bone. His eldest son, Basil, inherited the title of Earl of Denbigh and famously fought against his father during the Civil War. His second son, George Feilding, was awarded the right to the title of Earl of Desmond at the same time as his father was made Earl of Denbigh in 1622. George Feilding was around eight years old at the time. The Earldom of Desmond was a lesser title than the Earldom of Denbigh, being a title in the Irish, rather than English, peerage.

== Ancestry ==
Ancestors of William Feilding, 1st Earl of Denbigh

8. Sir Basil Feilding
4. Sir William Feilding
9. Goodith Willington
2. Sir Basil Feilding
10. Sir Ralph Lane of Orlingbury
5. Dorothy Lane
11. Magdalen Parr
1. Sir William Feilding, 1st Earl of Denbigh
12. Sir Edward Aston
6. Sir Walter Aston
13. Jane Bowles
3. Elizabeth Aston
14. Sir James Leveson
7. Elizabeth Leveson
15. Margaret Offley

== Notes ==
Honorary titles
Preceded by The Lord Brooke	Custos Rotulorum of Warwickshire; 1628–1643	Succeeded by The Lord Dunsmore
Peerage of England
New creation	Earl of Denbigh; 1622–1643	Succeeded by Basil Feilding
New creation	Viscount Feilding; 1620–1643	Succeeded by Basil Feilding
