= James Hamilton, 1st Duke of Hamilton =

Scottish nobleman and military leader (1606–1649)

His Grace The Duke of Hamilton KG PC
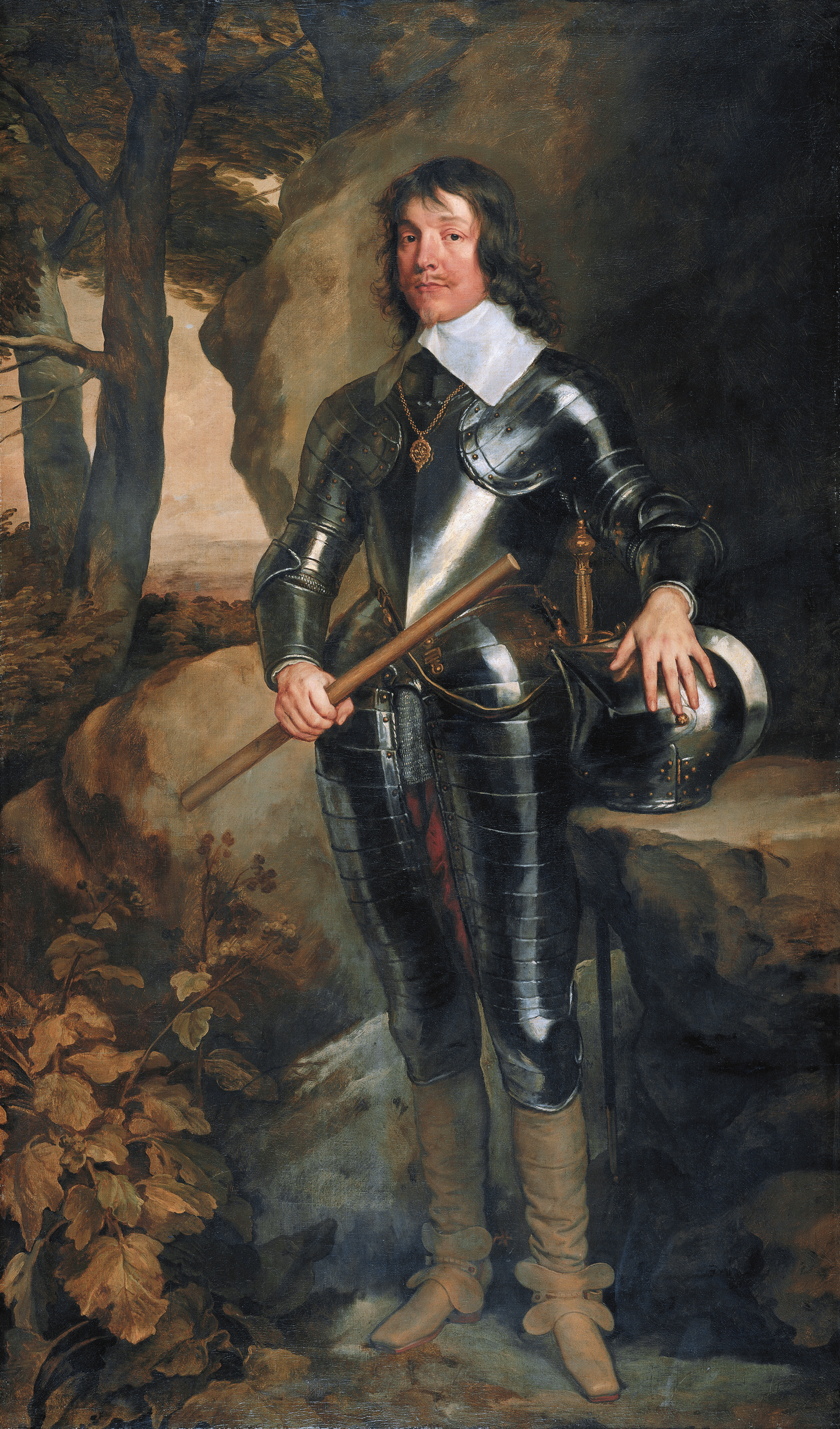
- Portrait by Sir Anthony van Dyck, 1640

Master of the Horse
- In office 1628–1644
- Monarch: Charles I
- Preceded by: The Earl of Holland
- Succeeded by: Prince Rupert of the Rhine

Personal details
- Born: 19 June 1606 Hamilton Palace, Lanarkshire, Scotland
- Died: 9 March 1649 (aged 42) Old Palace Yard, Palace of Westminster, London, England
- Spouse: Margaret Feilding, Duchess of Hamilton
- Children: Anne Hamilton, 3rd Duchess of Hamilton; Susannah Kennedy, Countess of Cassillis; Four children who died in infancy
- Parent(s): James, 2nd Marquess of Hamilton; Lady Ann Cunningham

James Hamilton, 1st Duke of Hamilton (19 June 1606 – 9 March 1649), known as the 3rd Marquess of Hamilton from March 1625 until April 1643, was a Scottish nobleman and influential political and military leader during the Thirty Years' War and the Wars of the Three Kingdoms.

== Young Arran ==
James was born in 1606 at Hamilton Palace in Lanarkshire, the son of James, 2nd Marquess of Hamilton, and the Lady Ann Cunningham, daughter of James, 7th Earl of Glencairn. Following the death of his insane great-uncle James, Earl of Arran, in 1609, the infant was styled Earl of Arran.

=== Heir to the throne of Scotland ===
The young Earl of Arran's close ancestor was the Princess Mary, daughter to James II of Scotland and Mary of Guelders. After the death in 1612 of Henry Frederick, Prince of Wales, eldest son of King James VI and I, the Earl of Arran became third in line to the throne of Scotland, after the King's surviving children, Charles, Duke of Rothesay (later Charles I of England and Scotland), and Elizabeth, who became Queen of Bohemia in 1613.

=== Education ===
James VI's first visit to Scotland since the Union of the Crowns occurred in early 1617, while in Scotland, he was apparently charmed by The 2nd Marquess of Hamilton, and invited him to court in London. The Marquess duly arrived in London in August of that year, with his eleven-year-old son, Lord Arran. Although like most noblemen's sons of the time he had a private tutor, James Bale, Arran's time spent at court in the ensuing years did not consist of much formal education. To remedy this, Arran was sent to Exeter College, Oxford; he matriculated on 14 December 1621.

=== Art collection ===
The future 1st Duke of Hamilton was interested in art from a young age and collected Venetian paintings through his agent Viscount Basil Feilding. An inventory of his collection was made sometime after Charles I's retreat from London in November 1642 and before 12 April 1643, which included 600 entries, of which half were Venetian paintings from the collections of Bartolomeo della Nave and others. A good portion of this collection later came into the hands of the Archduke Leopold Wilhelm in Brussels and forms a key part of the collection of the Kunsthistorisches Museum in Vienna today.

=== Marriage ===
The Marquess meanwhile had been intriguing with George, 1st Duke of Buckingham. Like all ambitious upstarts at court, Buckingham was keen to consolidate his new-found fortunes by allying himself and his family with established and wealthy families. Buckingham proposed to wed Lord Arran to his niece Mary, daughter to William, Viscount Feilding, an undistinguished Warwickshire squire. Lord Hamilton, despite his misgivings regarding Buckingham's lowly origins, was impressed enough by his influence with the king to accept his suggestion. On 16 June 1622, the fifteen-year-old Arran married nine-year-old Mary Feilding in the presence of the king. Arran was not consulted and later came to bitterly resent it.

== Marquess of Hamilton ==
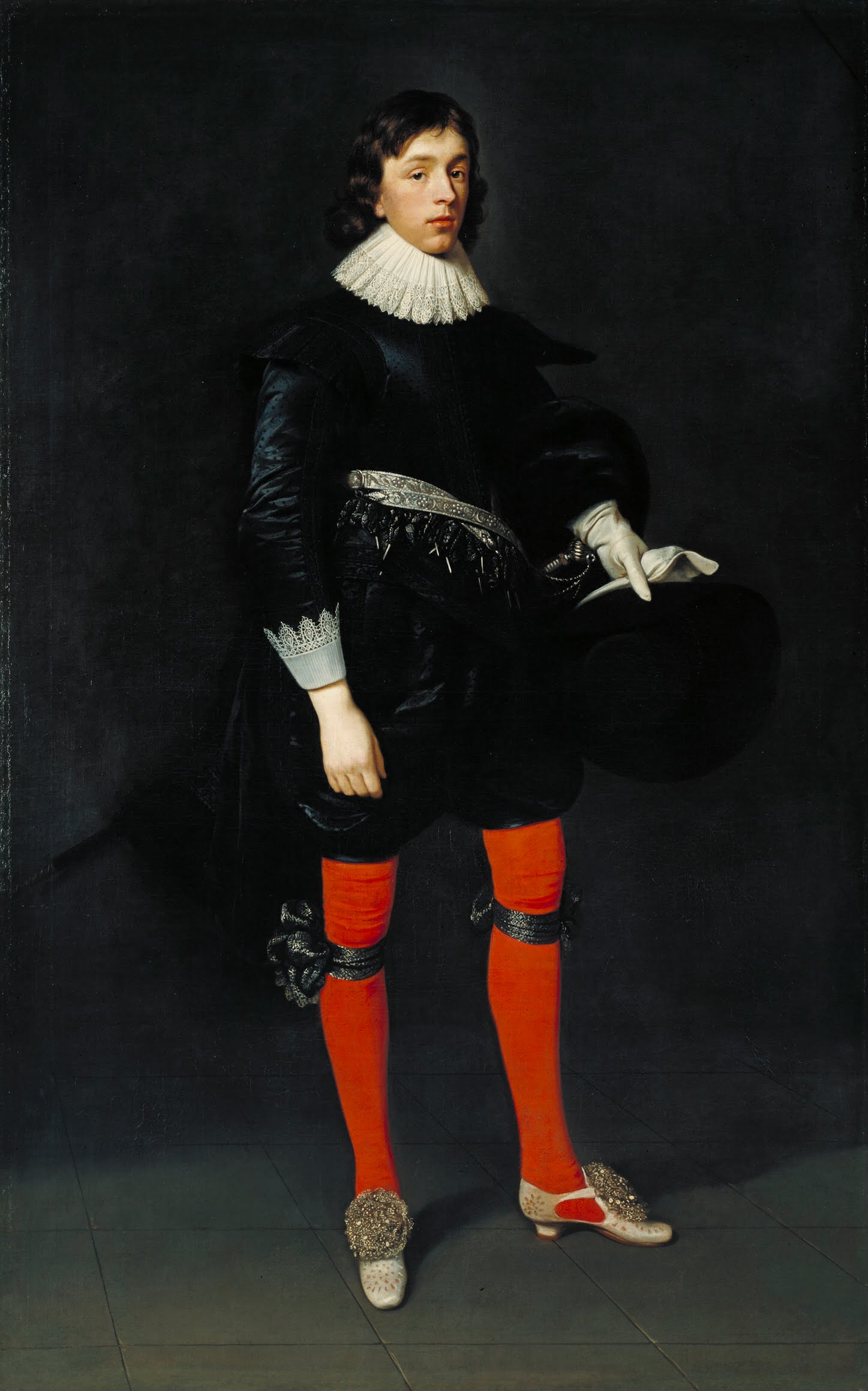
Portrait by Daniël Mijtens of James, then Earl of Arran, in 1623 (age 17). Painting is owned by Tate Britain, London. Lord Arran succeeded as The 3rd Marquess of Hamilton in April 1625.

On 2 March 1625, the 2nd Marquess died at Whitehall of a seizure. His death was blamed on fever, although the speed of his death and his age, thirty-six, made many suspect poison. King James died three weeks later. The new 3rd Marquess of Hamilton, as Lord Arran now became, received all his father's titles, and also the same annuity his father had received from the court of £2,500 sterling. At the coronation of King Charles I, young Lord Hamilton bore the Sword of State at Westminster Abbey.

In 1628, Lord Hamilton was made a Gentleman of the Bedchamber, Knight of the Garter, a privy counsellor in both England and Scotland, and in the same year was made Master of the Horse, a post he stayed in until 1644. He represented the King of Bohemia at the baptism of the infant Prince Charles.

== Hamilton's army in Germany ==
In 1631 Hamilton took over an army to assist Gustavus Adolphus in the Thirty Years' War in Germany. He raised these based on warrants to levy 6,000 men in England and a further 6,000 in Scotland. There has been much historical debate as to how many men landed initially, how many served in total and how effective these were. What is now known is that the initial contingent of 8,000 landed in Germany and other regiments, such as those of Sir Frederick Hamilton and Alexander Lord Forbes which were raised on warrants designed for the Marquis, actually arrived in Germany but served in the army group of Swedish commander Åke Tott.

Having no military training, Hamilton was assigned Major General Alexander Leslie as his mentor and other Scottish officers after Leslie was wounded. The command structure of the Hamilton Army was largely Scottish and was drawn from a mix of existing Scottish commanders in Swedish service. Major General Alexander Leslie and 'Dear Sandy' Alexander Hamilton (General of Artillery) were to be supported by Lieutenant General Archibald Douglas, also of the artillery. Although collectively these men believed they served in the "Scots Army", Marquis Hamilton actually took the title of "General of British" from the existing commander with that title, General James Spens who confusingly was compensated with the title "General of Scots" thereafter.

Despite being under-resourced, Hamilton's forces did greater service than they are usually given credit for. Under-clothed, and lightly armed, they lost many men to disease early on, but those who survived did very well. They guarded the river Oder while Gustavus Adolphus fought Tilly at the Battle of Breitenfeld. Thereafter Hamilton's army linked up with that of the Swedish field marshal, Johan Banér, and the combined force attacked Magdeburg. To Hamilton's chagrin, Banér wished to retire from the siege due to the cold and his response shows that even though not an experienced soldier, Hamilton was not without courage and made his feelings on the subject abundantly clear to Banér:

your propositioun of the retiring of my trups in respeckt of the could is so preiuditial to me, both in regard of his Majesties strik commands (which was to dou my best for the attackting of Madeburg) and my oune reputatioun as I had rader lous my lyf as faill in the performans of the woon, or in the leaist degri hazard the lousing of the other, and beliue me, so long as there is wone man before this toun (unless the King Majestie countermanding) I ame fully resolued not to budge from itt, being both myself, offisars and remnant soiours most willing and I hoope as abill to indoure whatsoeuer extremati of could or whatt eals may befall, for the aduansment of his Majesties saruis

Thereafter the two armies split. Never being allowed to unite all the regiments he had raised into one single force, many of his regiments continued to fight in other theatres of the Thirty Years' War. Moreover, having been caught up in a serious dispute with the Swedish king, the marquis and many of his officers were discharged from service on 22 October 1632. He returned to Britain taking with him Sir James Hamilton of Priestfield, Colonel James Ramsay 'the fair' and Colonel John Hamilton along with a cohort of Scots. Numerous others of the Hamilton army remained in Swedish service, not least generals Alexander Hamilton and Alexander Leslie, but also numerous of the lesser officers and the surviving common soldiers.

== Hamilton and Scotland ==
On his return to Great Britain, Hamilton became Charles I's chief adviser in Scottish affairs. In May 1638, after the outbreak of the revolt against the new Prayer-Book, he was appointed commissioner for Scotland to appease the discontents. He described the Covenanters as being "possessed by the devil", and instead of doing his utmost to support the king's interests is said to have been easily intimidated by the covenanting leaders. Nevertheless, on 27 July 1638 Charles sent Hamilton back to Scotland with new proposals for the election of an assembly and a parliament, episcopacy being safeguarded but bishops being made responsible to future assemblies. After a wrangle concerning the mode of election he again returned to Charles. Having been sent back to Edinburgh on 17 September 1638, he brought with him a revocation of the prayer-book and canons and another covenant to be substituted for the national covenant. On 21 November 1638, Lord Hamilton presided over the first meeting of the assembly in Glasgow Cathedral, but dissolved it on 28 November 1638 on its declaring the bishops responsible to its authority. The assembly, however, continued to sit notwithstanding, and Hamilton returned to England to give an account of his failure, leaving the enemy triumphant and in possession.

War was now decided upon, and Hamilton was chosen to command an expedition to the Firth of Forth to menace the rear of the Covenanters. However, he now faced his former military mentor Alexander Leslie, and the artillery specialist, Alexander Hamilton. Realising the strength of his opposition when he arrived in the Forth on 1 May 1639, he found Royalists had seriously underestimated their opposition. This included his own mother, Anne, Dowager Marchioness of Hamilton, who served as a colonel in the Army of the Covenant and was said to have threatened to shoot her son dead if he landed his forces in Scotland. A correspondent wrote, "She goeth in armour and with a pistoll by her side readie charged, and wishes him there, saying shee would burie the bullets in his bowells."

Whatever prompted his hesitance, the proposed plan to land proved impossible and Hamilton was recalled in June. On 8 July 1639, after a hostile reception at Edinburgh, he resigned his commissionership. He supported The 1st Earl of Strafford's proposal to call the Short Parliament, but otherwise opposed him as strongly as he could, as the chief adversary of the Scots; and he aided Henry Vane the Elder, it was believed, in accomplishing Strafford's destruction by sending for him to the Long Parliament.

Hamilton now supported the parliamentary party, desired an alliance with his nation, and persuaded Charles in February 1641 to admit some of their leaders into the council. On the death of Strafford (12 May 1641) Hamilton was confronted by a new antagonist in The 5th Earl of Montrose, who detested both his character and policy and repudiated his supremacy in Scotland.

On 10 August 1641 Hamilton accompanied Charles on his last visit to Scotland. His aim now was to effect an alliance between the king and Archibald Campbell, 8th Earl of Argyll, the former accepting Presbyterianism and receiving the help of the Scots against the English parliament, and when this failed he abandoned Charles and adhered to Argyll. In consequence he received a challenge from Lord Ker, of which he gave the king information, and obtained from Ker an apology. Montrose wrote to Charles declaring he could prove Hamilton to be a traitor. The king himself spoke of him as being "very active in his own preservation".

Shortly afterwards the plot—known as The Incident—to seize Argyll, Hamilton and the latter's brother, William Hamilton, Earl of Lanark, was discovered, and on 12 October 1641 they fled from Edinburgh. Hamilton returned not long afterwards, and notwithstanding all that had occurred still retained Charles's favour and confidence. He returned with him to London and accompanied him on 5 January 1642 when he went to the city after the failure to secure the five members. In July that year Hamilton went to Scotland on a hopeless mission to prevent the intervention of the Scots in the impending English Civil War, and a breach then took place between him and Argyll.

== Duke of Hamilton, and execution ==
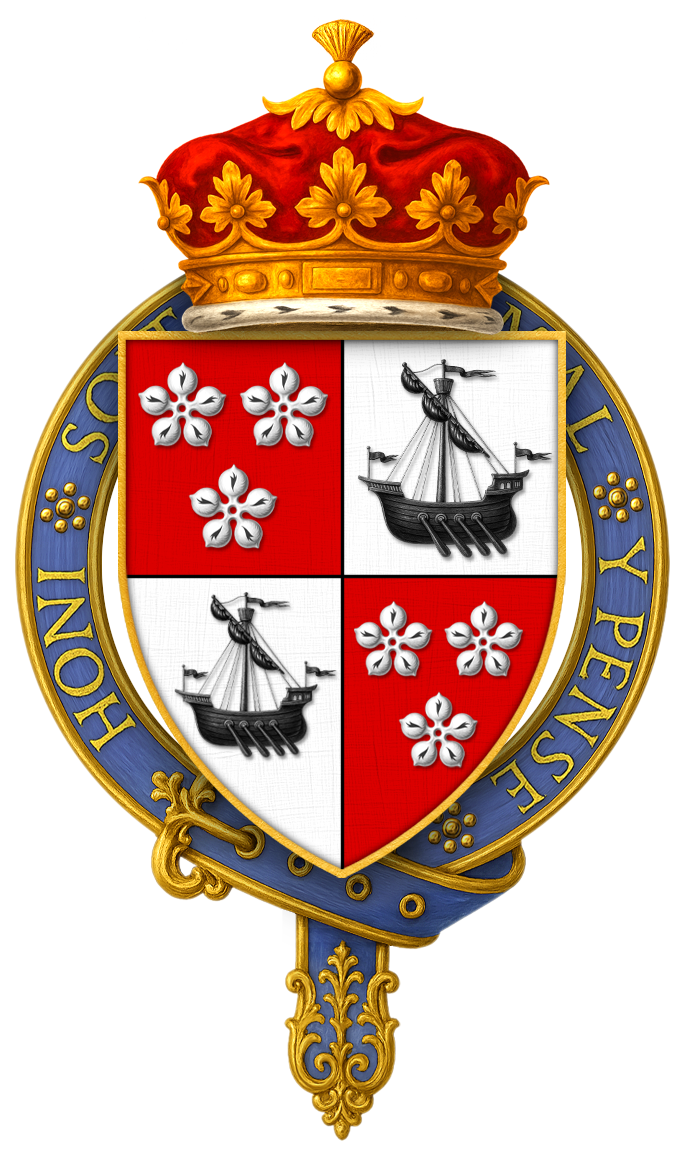
Arms of James, Duke of Hamilton

On 12 April 1643, Hamilton was further ennobled. At Oxford, King Charles conferred upon the Marquess the titles of Duke of Hamilton, Marquess of Clydesdale, Earl of Cambridge, the Baron of Aven and Innerdale; in addition he also regranted the Earldom of Arran.

Earlier, in February 1643, proposals of mediation between Charles and Parliament came from Scotland, Hamilton instigated the "cross petition" which demanded from Charles the surrender of the annuities of tithes in order to embarrass the 1st Earl of Loudoun, the chief promoter of the project, to whom they had already been granted. This failing, he promoted a scheme for overwhelming the influence and votes of Argyll and his party by sending to Scotland all the Scottish peers then with the king, thereby preventing any assistance to Parliament coming from that quarter, while Charles was to guarantee the establishment of Presbyterianism in Scotland only. This intrigue was strongly opposed by Montrose, who was eager to strike a sudden blow and anticipate and annihilate the plans of the Covenanters. Hamilton, however, gained over the queen, Henrietta Maria, for his project, while Montrose was condemned to inaction. Hamilton's scheme, however, completely failed. He had no control over the parliament. He was unable to hinder the meeting of the convention of the estates which assembled without the king's authority, and his supporters found themselves in a minority.

Finally, on refusing to take the Covenant, Hamilton and Lanark were obliged to leave Scotland. They arrived at Oxford on 16 December 1643. The Duke of Hamilton's conduct had at last incurred Charles's resentment and he was imprisoned in the house of a baker called Daniells, with only two servants and not allowed to leave the house. He was sent, in January 1644, a prisoner to Pendennis Castle, in 1645 being removed to St Michael's Mount, where he was liberated by Lord Fairfax's troops on 23 April 1646.

In 1646, Charles conferred on the Duke the heritable office of Keeper of Holyroodhouse.

Subsequently, he showed great activity in the futile negotiations between the Scots and Charles at Newcastle. In 1648, in consequence of the seizure of Charles by the army in 1647, Hamilton obtained a temporary influence and authority in the Parliament of Scotland over Argyll, and led a large force into England in support of the king on 8 July 1648. He showed complete incapacity in military command; was kept in check for some time by John Lambert; and though outnumbering the enemy by 24,000 to about 9,000 men, allowed his troops to disperse over the country and to be defeated in detail by Oliver Cromwell during the three days 17–19 August 1648 at the Battle of Preston, being himself taken prisoner on 25 August. He was tried on 6 February 1649, condemned to death on 6 March and executed by decapitation on 9 March.

== Character assessment ==
Hamilton, during his unfortunate career, had often been suspected of betraying the king's cause, and, as an heir to the Scottish throne, of intentionally playing into the hands of the Covenanters with a view of procuring the Crown for himself.

The charge was brought against him as early as 1631 when he was levying men in Scotland for the German expedition, but Charles gave no credence to it and showed his trust in the then-3rd Marquess of Hamilton by causing him to share his own room. The charge, however, always clung to him, and his intriguing character and hopeless management of the king's affairs in Scotland gave colour to the accusation. There seems, however, to be no real foundation for it. His career is sufficiently explained by his thoroughly egotistical character. Usually Hamilton is thought to have taken no interest whatever in the great questions at issue, and was neither loyal nor patriotic, and only desired peace and compromise to avoid personal losses. It has been said that "He was devoid of intellectual or moral strength, and was therefore easily brought to fancy all future tasks easy and all present obstacles insuperable".

== Issue and succession ==
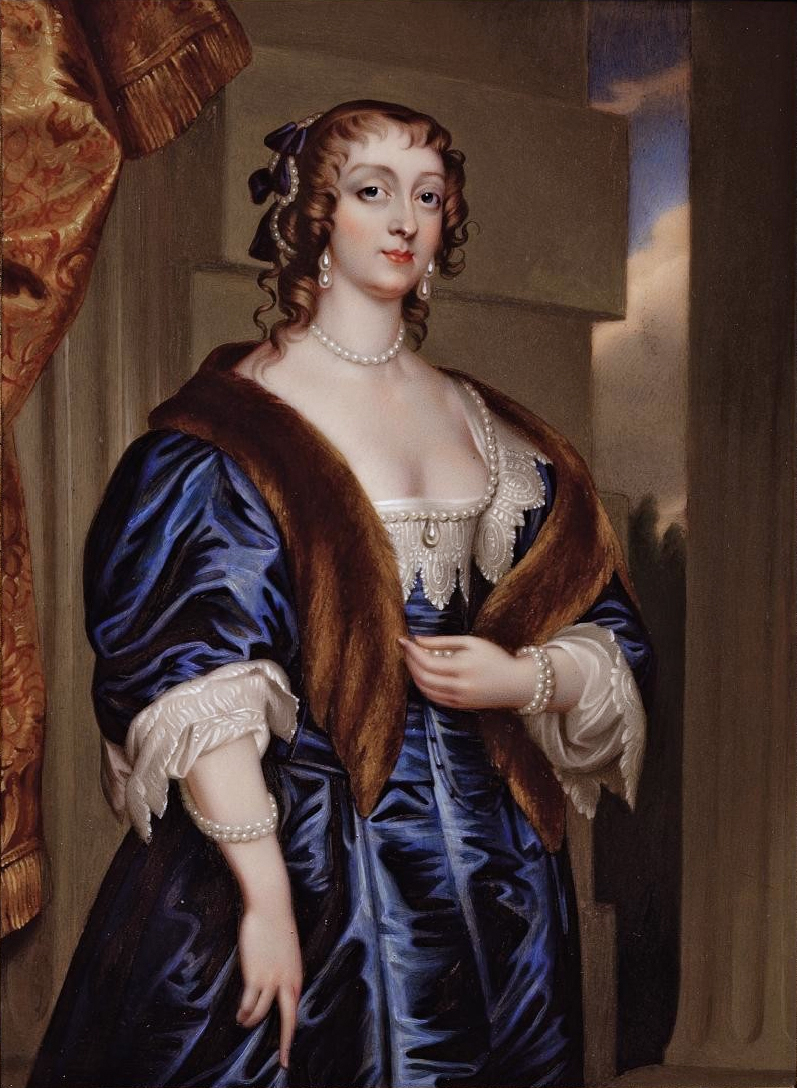
Lady Margaret (or 'Mary') Feilding, Duchess of Hamilton (Henry Pierce Bone after Anthony van Dyck)

By his wife Mary Feilding, Hamilton had six children, of whom four died in childhood.

- Henrietta Mary (1631–1632)
- Anne (1632–1716), later suo jure Duchess of Hamilton
- Susannah (1633–1694), married The 7th Earl of Cassilis in 1668
- Charles, Earl of Arran (ca. 1630 – buried 30 April 1640 in Westminster Abbey)
- James (1635–1639)
- William (1636–1638)

Following the death of his three sons, the dukedom passed by special remainder to his brother, The 1st Earl of Lanark. On the latter's death at Worcester in 1651, the Scottish titles reverted to the 1st Duke's eldest daughter, Anne. She married William, Earl of Selkirk, who was created Duke of Hamilton for life.

== Notes ==
Political offices
Preceded by The Earl of Holland	Master of the Horse; 1628–1644	Succeeded by Prince Rupert of the Rhine
Preceded by John Spottiswoode	Lord Chancellor of Scotland; 1638–1641	Succeeded by The Earl of Loudoun
Peerage of Scotland
New creation	Duke of Hamilton; 1643–1649	Succeeded by William Hamilton
Preceded by James Hamilton	Marquis of Hamilton; 1625–1643	Succeeded by William Hamilton
Peerage of England
Preceded by James Hamilton	Earl of Cambridge; 4th creation 1625–1649	Succeeded by William Hamilton
