= Anne O'Brien, 2nd Countess of Orkney =

Scottish peeress

The Right Honourable The Countess of Orkney The Countess of Inchiquin
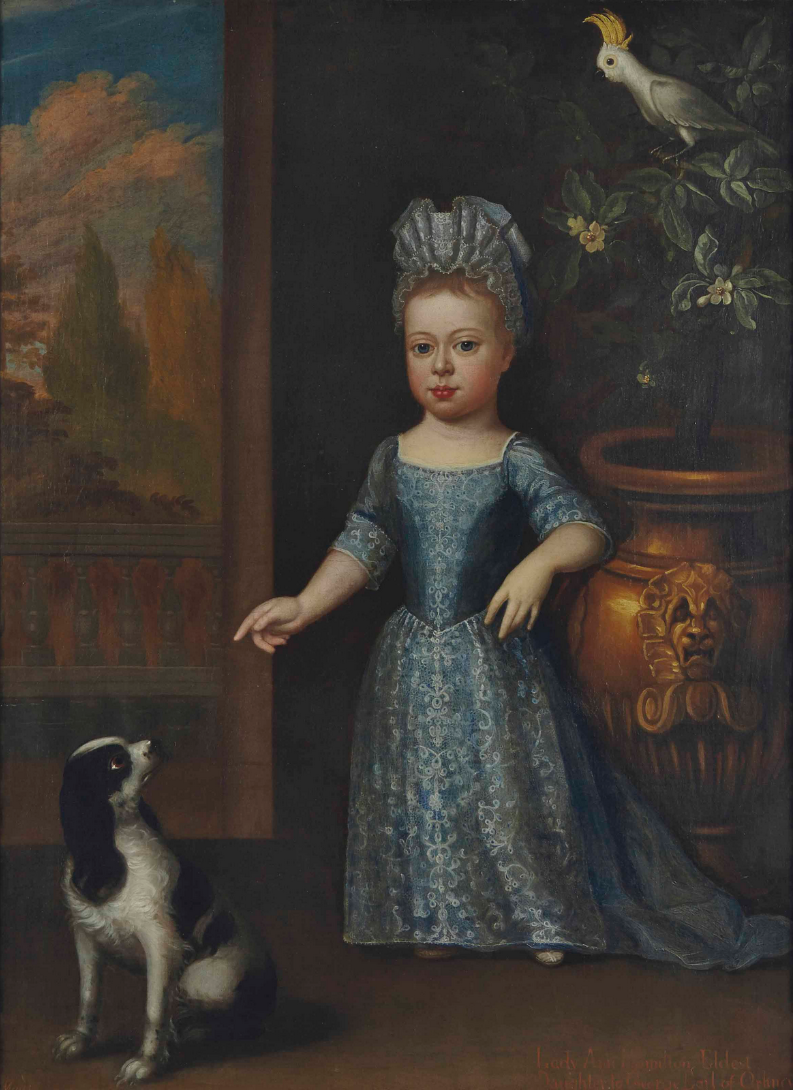
- Anne, 2nd Countess of Orkney, ca. 1700. Dutch school.

Countess of Orkney
- Reign: 1737–1756
- Predecessor: George Hamilton, 1st Earl of Orkney
- Successor: Mary O'Brien, 3rd Countess of Orkney
- Born: 1696
- Died: 6 December 1756 (aged 59–60); Taplow Court, Buckinghamshire, England
- Buried: Taplow Court, Buckinghamshire
- Spouse: William O'Brien, 4th Earl of Inchiquin (m. 1720; died 1756)
- Issue: Mary O'Brien, 3rd Countess of Orkney
- Father: George Hamilton, 1st Earl of Orkney
- Mother: Elizabeth Villiers

Anne O'Brien, 2nd Countess of Orkney (born Lady Anne Hamilton; 1696 – 6 December 1756) was a Scottish noblewoman and peeress, the eldest daughter and heiress of Field Marshal George Hamilton, 1st Earl of Orkney, and his wife, the former Elizabeth Villiers. As the wife of William O'Brien, 4th Earl of Inchiquin, she was also Countess of Inchiquin in the Irish peerage.

== Family background ==
Lady Anne Hamilton was born in 1696, the eldest of the three daughters of Field Marshal George Hamilton, 1st Earl of Orkney, and his wife, the former Elizabeth Villiers. Her two younger sisters, Lady Frances Hamilton and Lady Henrietta Hamilton, married Thomas Lumley-Saunderson, 3rd Earl of Scarbrough, and John Boyle, 5th Earl of Cork, respectively.

Her father was a prominent Scottish soldier, the first British Army officer ever promoted to the rank of Field Marshal, and a younger son of William Douglas, 1st Earl of Selkirk and Anne, 3rd Duchess of Hamilton. Her mother Elizabeth Villiers was an English courtier and mistress of William III, King of England and Scotland, before her marriage, from 1680 until 1695.

== Marriage and issue ==
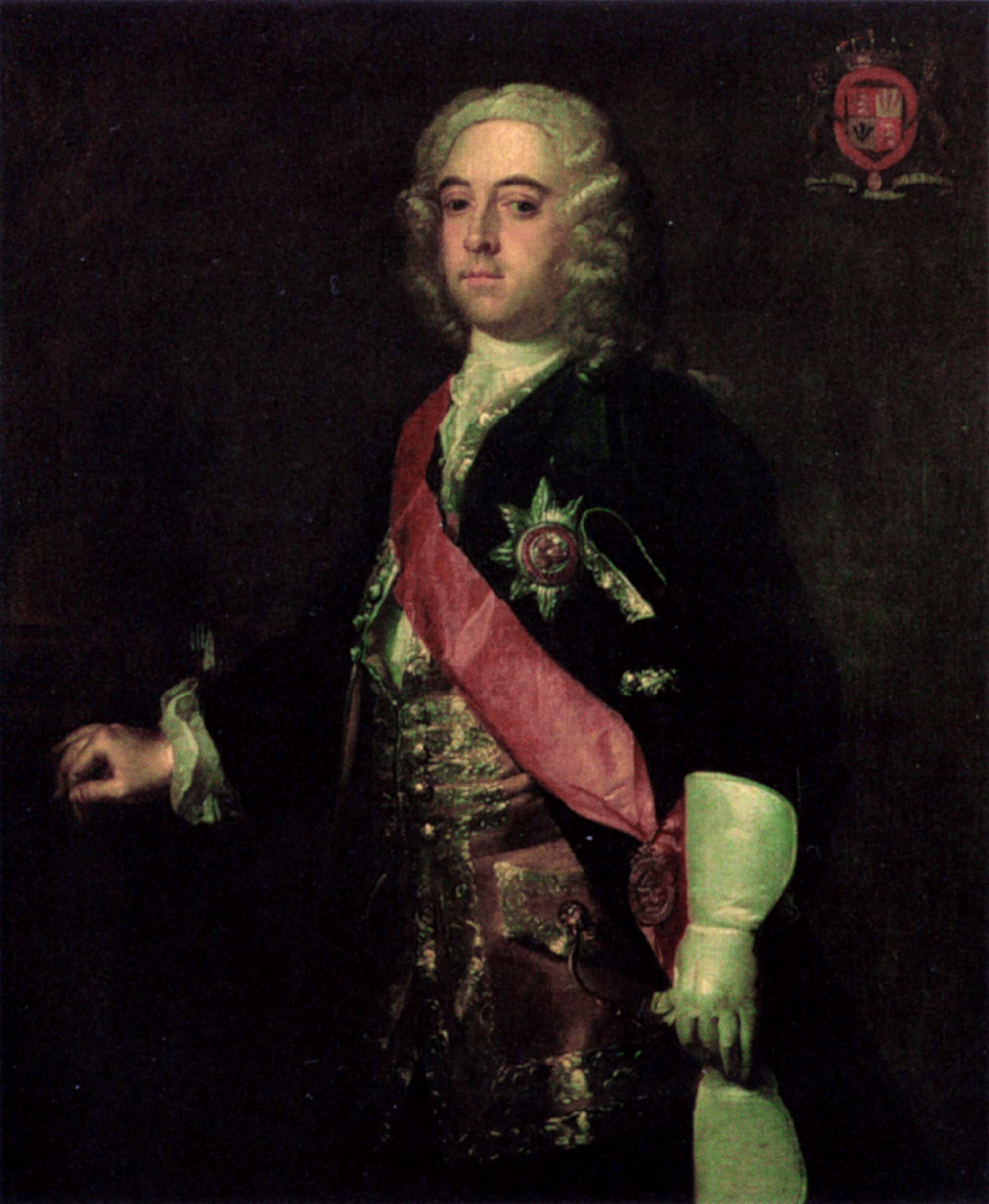
Her husband, William O’Brien, 4th Earl of Inchiquin.

She married on 29 March 1720, at Taplow, as his first wife, her maternal first cousin, William O'Brien, 4th Earl of Inchiquin, son and heir of William O'Brien, 3rd Earl of Inchiquin by Mary Villiers, daughter of Sir Edward Villiers (her grandfather). Her husband, an Irish nobleman and the head of the O’Brien dynasty, had succeeded to his father's dignity the year before on 24 December 1719, and she thus became Countess of Inchiquin upon marriage. The titles of her husband also included the O'Brien, Chief of the Name, Prince of Thomond, and Lord of Dál gCais.

They had four sons and four daughters, and they were:

- Lady Mary O'Brien (c. 1721–1790), their only surviving child, who succeeded her mother as 3rd Countess of Orkney
- William, Lord O'Brien (1725–1727)
- George, Lord O'Brien (1727–1728)
- Augustus, Lord O'Brien (died in infancy)
- Murrough, Viscount Kirkwall and Lord O'Brien (died 1741, of smallpox), who was heir to Henry O'Brien, 8th Earl of Thomond, but died before inheriting
- Lady Anne O'Brien (1721–1808), unmarried.
- Lady Frances O'Brien (1728–1740)
- Lady Elizabeth O'Brien (1729–1741)

Only two of Anne’s eight offspring, Mary and Anne, survived into adulthood.

== Succession and landowner ==
The earldom of Orkney, her father's peerage, was created in 1696 with special remainder "to the heirs whatsoever of his body", meaning that the title can be passed on through both male and female lines. Upon her father’s death in January 1737, she thus succeeded to his titles in the Peerage of Scotland, as heiress of the line, thereby becoming suo jure 2nd Countess of Orkney, along with the subsidiary titles of 2nd Viscountess Kirkwall and 2nd Baroness Dechmont. She also inherited her father's estates of Taplow Court, and the adjacent Cliveden in Buckinghamshire. Almost immediately after inheriting Cliveden, in 1737, she leased the palatial estate to Frederick, Prince of Wales, son of King George II and Queen Caroline of Ansbach. While Prince Frederick and his family used Cliveden as a lavish summer retreat, the Countess of Orkney and her husband removed to nearby Taplow Court. He leased it until 1751, when the Prince died unexpectedly.

As she left no surviving sons, the earldom of Orkney and its subsidiary titles passed under the original remainder to her eldest surviving daughter, Mary, who became 3rd Countess of Orkney in her own right. Through Mary and her only surviving child, another Mary who became 4th Countess of Orkney, the title later passed into the FitzMaurice and St John families.

== Death ==
She died, without male succession, on 6 December 1756, aged 60, and was buried on 12 December 1756 at Taplow. Her husband died in 1777, and was buried in Cloyne Cathedral. From her, the present Earl of Orkney descents.

Peerage of Scotland
Preceded by George Hamilton	Countess of Orkney; 1737–1756	Succeeded by Mary O'Brien
