= William Villiers, 2nd Earl of Jersey =

British politician

The Right Honourable The Earl of Jersey
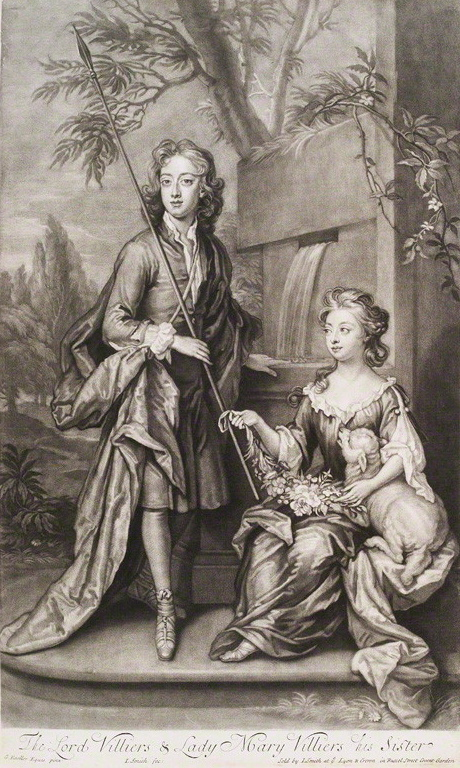
- The Earl of Jersey as a boy, with his sister, Mary, later Lady Lansdowne.

Member of Parliament for Kent
- In office 1705–1708

Personal details
- Born: c. 1682
- Died: 13 July 1721 (aged 38–39)
- Spouse: Judith Herne (m. 1704)
- Children: 3, including William and Thomas
- Parents: Edward Villiers (father); Barbara Chiffinch (mother)
- Relatives: Villiers family William Chiffinch (grandfather); Edward Villiers (grandfather)

William Villers, 2nd Earl of Jersey (c. 1682 – 13 July 1721), styled Viscount Villiers from 1697 to 1711, was a British Tory politician from the Villiers family.

== Biography ==
Jersey was the son of Edward Villiers, 1st Earl of Jersey, and his wife Barbara, daughter of William Chiffinch. His father had held several appointments as a Tory statesman, while his mother was an overt Jacobite who was created suo jure Countess of Jersey in the Jacobite peerage by the exiled Pretender, James Francis Edward Stuart, in 1716.

Jersey was educated at Queens' College, Cambridge, graduating in 1700, before travelling in France where his father was ambassador in Paris. Despite being underage, on his return to England, he was appointed to the sinecure office of Teller of the Receipt of the Exchequer. Sir John Stanley, 1st Baronet, was appointed to officiate for him, but on the accession of Queen Anne in 1702, Jersey had to relinquish the office in return for a pension.

Between 1702 and 1703 he undertook the Grand Tour to Italy, and stayed in Florence, Padua, Venice and Rome, where he visited the Duke of Shrewsbury on three occasions in summer 1702. While in Florence in 1703 he commissioned Massimiliano Soldani Benzi to produce a bronze medallion portrait of himself.

He represented Kent in the House of Commons from 1705 to 1708. He was classed as a "churchman" and a Tory on two lists of the House early in 1708. In August 1707, a county meeting attempted to have Jersey replaced by Percival Hart as a member of parliament for Kent, and Jersey opted to not contest the 1708 British general election.

By 1710, Jersey had gained some notoriety, in part owing to an alleged affair with the Duchess of Montagu. In 1711, he succeeded his father as earl and assumed his seat in the House of Lords. From here, he supported Robert Harley's ministry and remained a Tory after Harley's fall from power and imprisonment in 1715. Like his parents, Jersey had Jacobite sympathies and in April 1716 he was created Earl of Jersey in the Jacobite peerage by the Old Pretender, although it is unknown if Jersey was being rewarded for a specific action on behalf of the exiled House of Stuart.

=== Marriage and children ===
On 22 March 1704, William married Judith Herne, daughter of Frederick Herne and Elizabeth Lisle. From this marriage he received a large dowry, rumored to be worth up to £40,000. They had three children:

- Barbara Villiers (25 August 1706 – d. 1761), married firstly, Sir William Blackett, 2nd Baronet. She married secondly, Bussy Mansell, 4th Baron Mansell.
- William Villiers, 3rd Earl of Jersey (8 March 1707 – d. 1769). Through William, the 3rd Earl, they are ancestors of Diana, Princess of Wales, and of her sons, William, Prince of Wales, and Prince Harry, Duke of Sussex.
- Thomas Villiers, 1st Earl of Clarendon (19 June 1709 – d. 1786)

Parliament of England
Preceded by Sir Thomas Hales; Sir Francis Leigh	Member of Parliament for Kent; 1705–1707; With: Sir Cholmeley Dering	Succeeded by Parliament of Great Britain
Parliament of Great Britain
Preceded by Parliament of England	Member of Parliament for Kent; 1707–1708; With: Sir Cholmeley Dering	Succeeded by Sir Thomas Palmer; Sir Stephen Lennard
Peerage of England
Preceded by Edward Villiers	Earl of Jersey; 1711–1721	Succeeded by William Villiers
New creation	— TITULAR — Earl of Jersey; Jacobite peerage 1716–1721	Succeeded by William Villiers
