= William O'Brien, 4th Earl of Inchiquin =

Irish peer and Whig politician

The Right Honourable The Earl of Inchiquin KB PC(I)
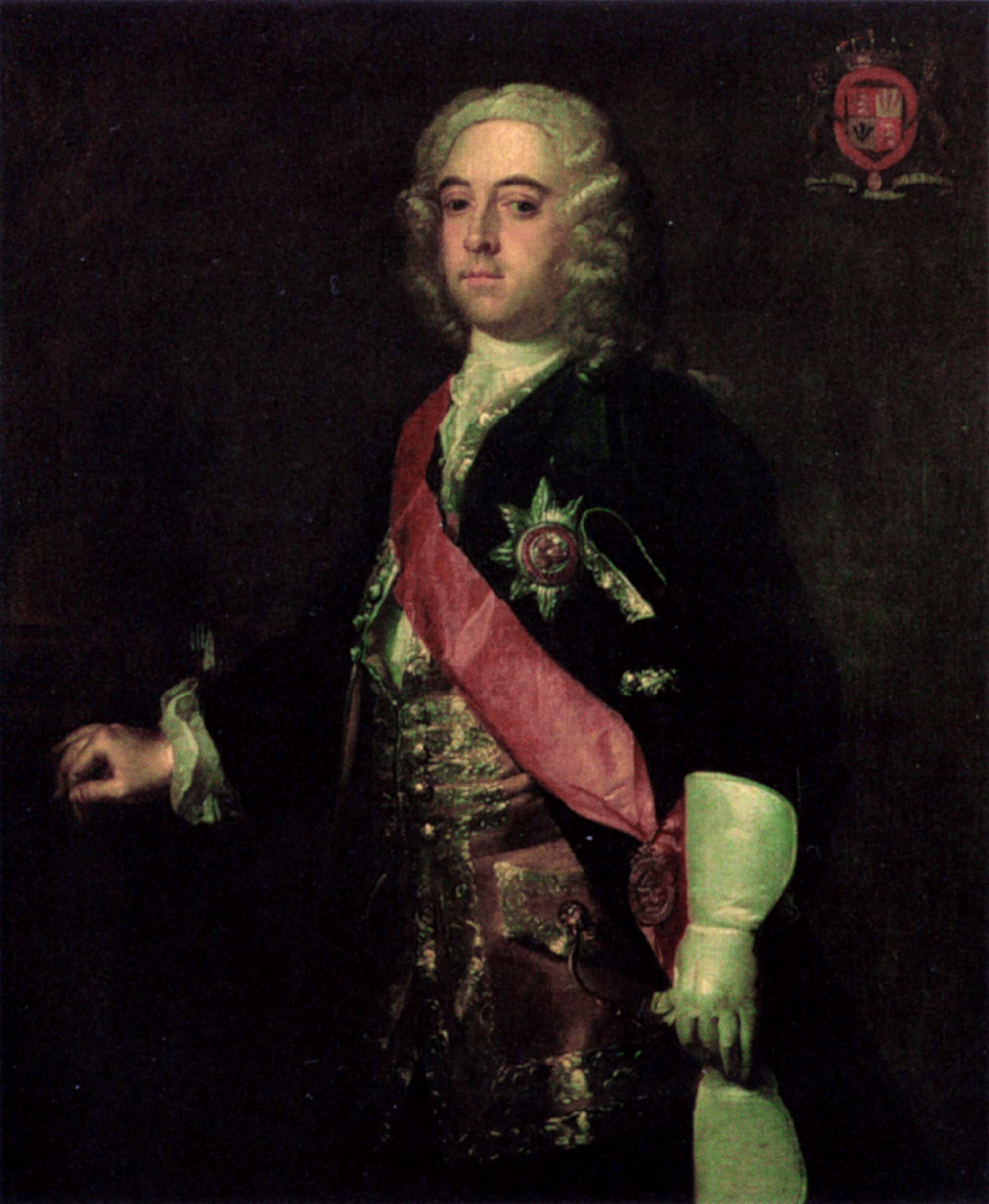

Personal details
- Born: Ireland
- Died: Ireland
- Spouse: Lady Anne Hamilton
- Children: 5, including Mary
- Parents: William O'Brien, 3rd Earl of Inchiquin (father); Mary O'Brien (mother)
- Occupation: Politician

William O'Brien, 4th Earl of Inchiquin, KB, PC(I) (1700 – 18 July 1777) was an Irish peer, Chief of Clan O'Brien, and Whig politician who sat in the House of Commons between 1722 and 1754.

== Background ==
O'Brien was the eldest son of William O'Brien, 3rd Earl of Inchiquin, and his wife, Mary (née Villiers), sister of the 1st Earl of Jersey, and inherited his father's titles in 1719. He founded the predecessor of the present day Royal Cork Yacht Club, the Water Club of the Cork Harbour, in 1720.

== Political career ==
Inchiquin was Whig Member of Parliament for Windsor from 1722 to 1727, for Tamworth from 1727 to 1734, for Camelford from 1741 to 1747 and for Aylesbury from 1747 to 1754. In 1725, he had been appointed a Knight Companion of the Order of the Bath. From 1740 to 1741, he was Grand Master of the Premier Grand Lodge of England, Governor of County Clare from 1741 to 1777 and Custos Rotulorum of Clare from 1762 to 1767. From 1744 to 1751, he was a Lord of the Bedchamber to Frederick, Prince of Wales, and admitted to the Privy Council of Ireland in 1753.

On his death in 1777, without surviving male heirs, his titles passed to his nephew, Murrough O'Brien, who was also his son-in-law and was later created Marquess of Thomond.

== Family ==
On 29 March 1720, he married his cousin, Lady Anne Hamilton, the eldest daughter and heiress of George Hamilton, 1st Earl of Orkney, and his wife Elizabeth (née Villiers). His wife became 2nd Countess of Orkney in her own right in 1737. They had five children:

- Lady Mary (c.1721–1791), later 3rd Countess of Orkney
- William, styled Lord O'Brien (1725–1727)
- George, styled Lord O'Brien (1727–1728)
- Augustus, styled Lord O'Brien (died in infancy)
- Murrough, styled Lord O'Brien, later styled Viscount Kirkwall (1731–1741)

He married, secondly, Mary Moore, daughter of Stephen Moore, 1st Viscount Mount Cashell and Alicia Colville, on 12 October 1761

Additionally, Inchiquin was feted by antiquarians and many of the works of Irish history produced at this time are dedicated to him; as an Anglican deriving his lineage from an old Gaelic family, he was a politique choice for those wishing to disseminate their work in Ascendancy Ireland and Hanoverian Britain.

Parliament of Great Britain
Preceded by Sir Henry Ashurst; Samuel Travers	Member of Parliament for Windsor; 1722–1727; With: Earl of Burford 1722–1726; Lord Vere Beauclerk 1726–1727	Succeeded by Lord Vere Beauclerk; Viscount Malpas
Preceded by Hon. Francis Willoughby; Hon. George Compton	Member of Parliament for Tamworth; 1727–1734; With: Thomas Willoughby	Succeeded by Lord John Sackville; Hon. George Compton
Preceded by Sir Thomas Lyttelton; Hon. James Cholmondeley	Member of Parliament for Camelford; 1741–1747; With: Charles Montagu	Succeeded by The Earl of Londonderry; Samuel Martin
Preceded by Charles Pilsworth; Hon. William Stanhope	Member of Parliament for Aylesbury; 1747–1754; With: Edward Willes	Succeeded by Thomas Potter; John Willes
Masonic offices
Preceded by Lord Paisley	Grand Master of the Premier Grand Lodge of England; 1726–1727	Succeeded by The Lord Coleraine
Peerage of Ireland
Preceded by William O'Brien	Earl of Inchiquin; 1719–1777	Succeeded by Murrough O'Brien
