= Sir Edward Dering, 3rd Baronet =

English Army officer and politician (1650–1689)

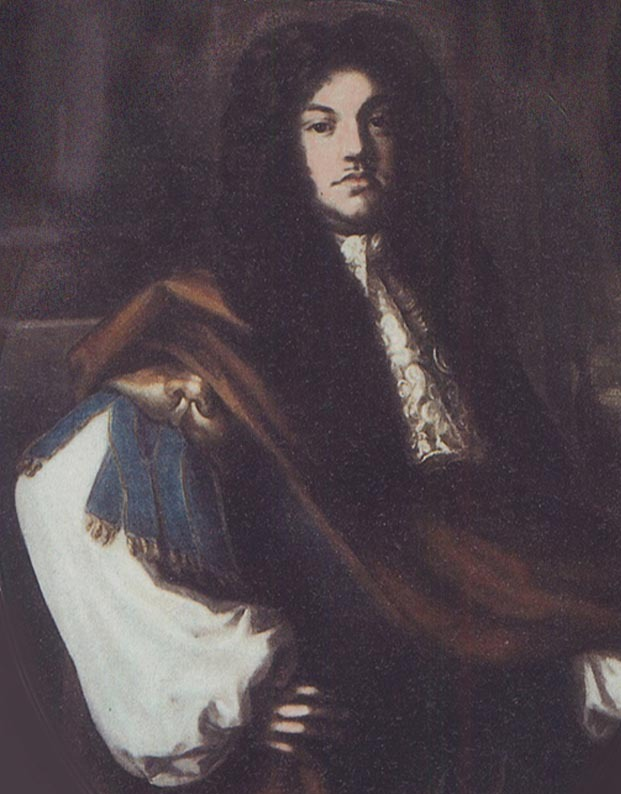
Portrait of Dering

Colonel Sir Edward Dering, 3rd Baronet (18 April 1650 – 15 October 1689) was an English Army officer and politician who represented Kent in the House of Commons of England from 1679 to 1685. He was the eldest son of Sir Edward Dering, 2nd Baronet of Surrenden Dering House in the Kent village of Pluckley and his wife Lady Mary Dering, a composer and niece of William Harvey. Dering succeeded to his father's baronetcy upon the latter's death on 24 June 1684. Like his father and grandfather before him, Dering served as an MP for Kent; he sat in the last three parliaments of Charles II of England between 1679 and 1681 (the Oxford Parliament). His father was still living, and MP for Hythe at the time, so Dering was returned as Edward Dering Esq.

Defeated in the 1689 English general election as the parliamentary candidate for Hythe, Dering proceeded to raised a regiment of foot in the English army and as Colonel of the Regiment led it across the Irish Sea to fight in the Williamite War in Ireland. There he fell ill and died at the age of 39. His body was brought home and buried in Pluckley. He had married Elizabeth, the daughter of Sir William Cholmeley, 2nd Baronet; she was coheiress to her brother Sir Hugh Cholmeley, 3rd Baronet, who had died as a child. The given name Cholmeley was often used in the Dering family from this point, the first being their son Sir Cholmeley Dering, 4th Baronet. Lady Dering died on 20 October 1704 and was also buried at Pluckley.

Parliament of England
Preceded by Sir John Tufton; Sir Thomas Peyton	Member of Parliament for Kent; 1679–1685; With: Sir Vere Fane	Succeeded by Sir John Knatchbull; Sir William Twysden
Baronetage of England
Preceded by Edward Dering	Baronet (of Surrenden Dering); 1684–1689	Succeeded by Cholmeley Dering
