= Barbara Berkeley, Viscountess Fitzhardinge =

English noblewoman and courtier (c. 1654–1708)

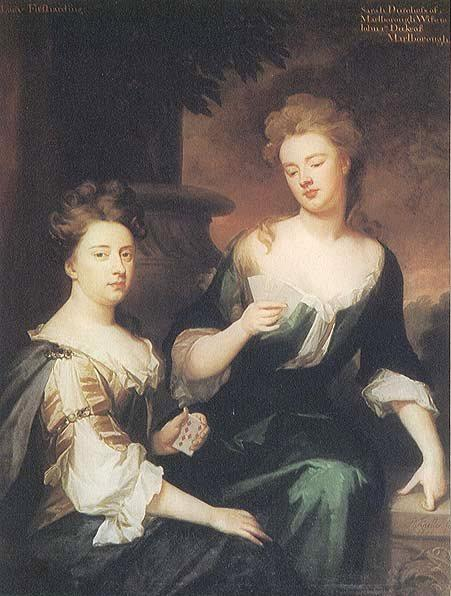
Barbara (left) playing cards with her closest friend, Sarah, Duchess of Marlborough, by Sir Godfrey Kneller, c. 1702

Barbara Berkeley, Viscountess Fitzhardinge (née Villiers; c. 1654 – 19 September 1708) was a lady-in-waiting to Queen Anne of Great Britain and governess to Prince William, Duke of Gloucester. Her sister Elizabeth Villiers (later Countess of Orkney) was the acknowledged mistress of William III of England from 1680 to 1695.

Born to Colonel Sir Edward Villiers of Richmond and Lady Frances Howard (a descendant of John Howard, 1st Duke of Norfolk), Barbara became a maid of honour to the princesses of York before Mary married William in 1677. Instead of accompanying her sisters Anne, Katherine and Elizabeth to The Hague, Barbara remained in England to join Anne's household, attracting the companionship of Sarah Churchill, Duchess of Marlborough, and invoking a sense of jealousy and rage within their royal mistress, Queen Anne. Naturally ambitious like the rest of her family, Barbara mixed scintillating wit with devious deception in order to promote dissatisfaction against the Churchills, who came to abhor the reign of William III and Mary II (1689–1702).

Barbara was thought to be a secret Jacobite.

== Issue ==
Barbara married John Berkeley, 4th Viscount Fitzhardinge of Berehaven (1650 – 19 December 1712). They had two daughters, neither of whom inherited their father's title:

- Hon. Frances Berkeley, married Sir Thomas Clarges, 2nd Bt. before 1721. They had two children.
- Hon. Mary Berkeley (bef. 1671 – 3 June 1741), married Walter Chetwynd, 1st Viscount Chetwynd of Bearhaven on 27 May 1703 in St. Martin-in-the-Fields in Church, Covent Garden, London. She was a maid of honor to Queen Anne. No issue.

Lady Fitzhardinge died in 1708 and is buried in Westminster Abbey.
