= Countess of Jersey =

Countess of Jersey is a title given to the wife of the Earl of Jersey. Women who have held the title include:

- Barbara Chiffinch, Countess of Jersey (1663–1735), widow of Edward Villiers, 1st Earl of Jersey, who was also created suo jure Countess of Jersey in the Jacobite peerage in 1716
- Anne Russell, Duchess of Bedford, afterwards Countess of Jersey (c.1705–1762)
- Frances Villiers, Countess of Jersey (1753–1821)
- Sarah Villiers, Countess of Jersey (1785–1867)
- Margaret Child Villiers, Countess of Jersey (1849–1945)
- Virginia Cherrill, Countess of Jersey (1908–1996)
