= Cholmeley baronets =

Set index for Cholmeley baronets

There have been two baronetcies created for people with the surname Cholmeley, one in the Baronetage of England and one in the Baronetage of the United Kingdom. One creation is extant as of 2023. The family surname is pronounced "Chumley".

- Cholmeley baronets of Whitby (1641)
- Cholmeley baronets of Easton (1806)
