= Dering baronets =

Extinct baronetcy in the Baronetage of England

Augmented escutcheon of the Dering Baronets of Surrenden Dering

The Dering baronetcy, of Surrenden Dering, Kent, was created in the Baronetage of England on 1 February 1627 for Edward Dering. It became extinct on the death of the 12th Baronet Rupert Anthony Yea Dering who died on 16 March 1975.

== Dering of Surrenden Dering, Kent (1626) ==
- Sir Edward Dering, 1st Baronet (28 January 1598 – 22 June 1644)
- Sir Edward Dering, 2nd Baronet (8 November 1625 – 24 June 1684)
- Sir Edward Dering, 3rd Baronet (18 April 1650 – 15 October 1689)
- Sir Cholmeley Dering, 4th Baronet (23 June 1679 – 9 May 1711)
- Sir Edward Dering, 5th Baronet (1705 – 15 April 1762)
- Sir Edward Dering, 6th Baronet (28 September 1732 – 8 December 1798)
- Sir Edward Dering, 7th Baronet (16 February 1757 – 30 June 1811)
- Sir Edward Cholmeley Dering, 8th Baronet (19 November 1807 – 1 April 1896)
- Sir Henry Nevill Dering, 9th Baronet (21 September 1839 – 25 August 1906)
- Sir Henry Edward Dering, 10th Baronet (9 May 1866 – 14 June 1931)
- Sir Anthony Myles Cholmeley Dering, 11th Baronet (29 July 1901 – 23 April 1958)
- Sir Rupert Anthony Yea Dering, 12th Baronet (17 October 1915 – 16 March 1975)

== Arms ==
Coat of arms of Dering baronets
| Crest On a ducal coronet Or, a horse passant Sable. Escutcheon Quarterly 1 & 4, Argent, a fess Azure, in chief three torteaux (an augmentation); 2 & 3, Or, a saltire Sable. Supporters Two horses Sable maned Or. Motto Semni ne semni (I can do nothing without God). |

Baronetage of England
| Preceded by Beaumont baronets | Dering baronets of Surrenden Dering; 1 February 1627 | Succeeded by Kempe baronets |
