= Elizabeth Hamilton, Countess of Orkney =

English courtier and the reputed mistress of William III (1657–1733)

The Right Honourable The Countess of Orkney
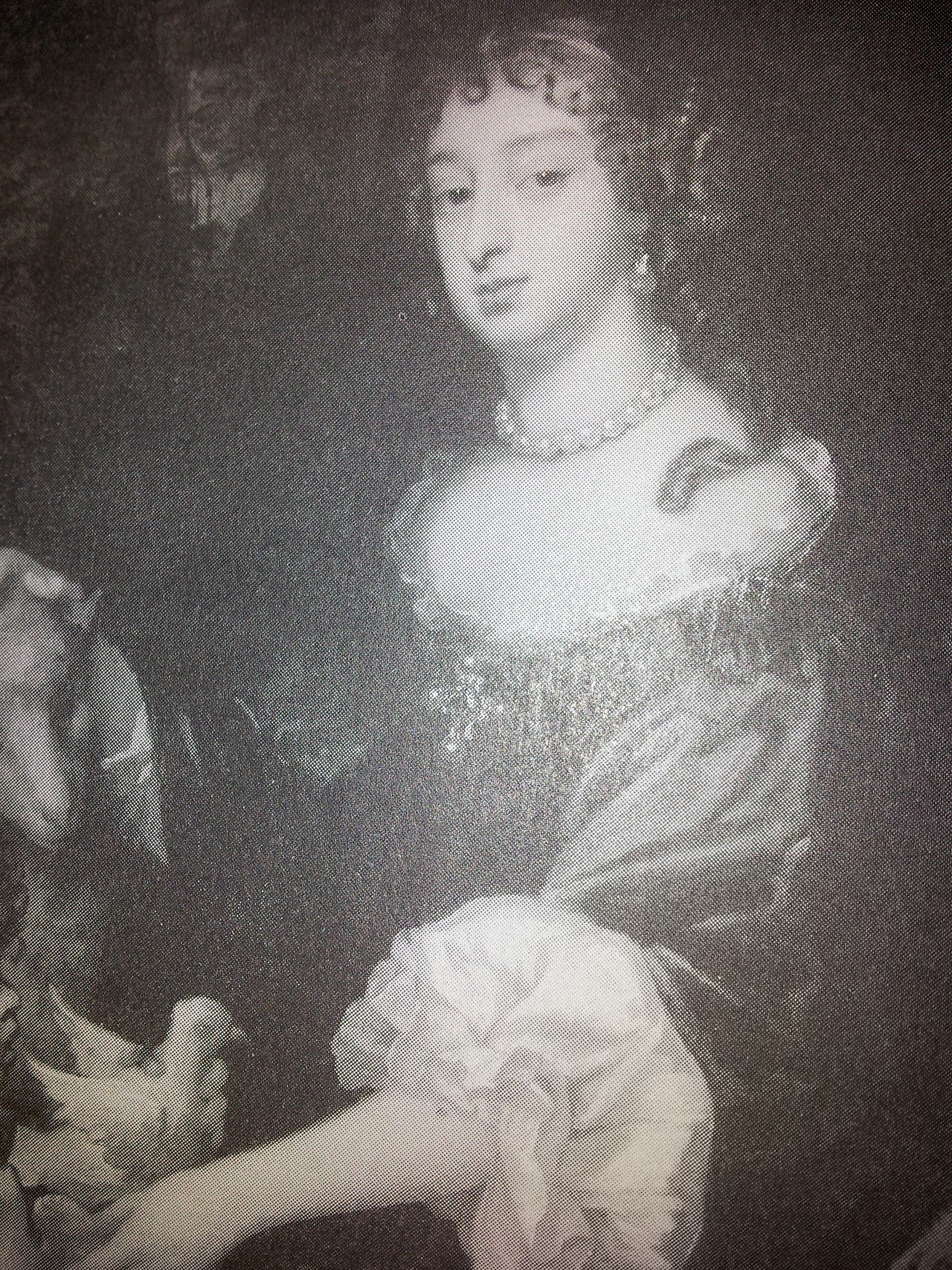
- Portrait of the countess
- Full name: Elizabeth Hamilton
- Born: Elizabeth Villiers; 1657; England
- Died: 19 April 1733 (aged 75–76); London, England
- Noble family: Villiers family (by birth); House of Hamilton (by marriage)
- Spouse: George Hamilton, 1st Earl of Orkney
- Issue: Anne O'Brien, 2nd Countess of Orkney; Frances Lumley-Saunderson, Countess of Scarbrough; Henrietta Boyle, Countess of Cork
- Father: Sir Edward Villiers
- Mother: Lady Frances Howard

Elizabeth Hamilton, Countess of Orkney (née Villiers; 1657 – 19 April 1733) was an English courtier from the Villiers family and the reputed mistress of William III, King of England and Scotland, from 1680 until 1695. She was a lady-in-waiting to his wife and co-monarch, Queen Mary II of England.

== Life ==
Elizabeth Villiers was born to Colonel Sir Edward Villiers of Richmond, Surrey, and Lady Frances Howard, herself the youngest daughter of Theophilus Howard, 2nd Earl of Suffolk, and Lady Elizabeth Home.

In 1660, Charles II's brother James (the future James II) married the commoner Anne Hyde, who was already pregnant at the time. Elizabeth's mother, Lady Villiers, was awarded the position of governess to James and Anne's children. Although Anne had four daughters and four sons, only Mary (the future Mary II) born in 1662 and Anne, born in 1665, survived to adulthood.

Lady Villiers used her position to secure for her children both place and influence in the future Queen Mary II's household. Elizabeth's sisters Anne and Katherine were among the maids of honour who accompanied Lady Mary to the Hague, to marry and serve as Princess of Orange; meanwhile, Elizabeth's brother Edward, later created 1st Earl of Jersey, was Master of the Horse.

Elizabeth is reputed to have become William's mistress in 1680. In 1685, Mary's father James II exploited rumours of William's infidelity in an attempt to cause a split between his daughter and the prince. Mary II died on 28 December 1694, and within a year or so, William ended his relationship with Elizabeth Villiers, motivated, it is said, by his wife's expressed wishes before her death.

In 1694, two men fought a duel, reputedly over the affections of Elizabeth Villiers. John Law, then a rich young man, killed Edward "Beau" Wilson on 9 April 1694. Wilson had challenged Law, although Law may have provoked Wilson on the instigation of Villiers, due to a conflict she had with Wilson regarding money and attempted blackmail. Law was tried and initially found guilty of murder and sentenced to death. His sentence was commuted to a fine, upon the ground that the offence only amounted to manslaughter. Wilson's brother appealed and had Law imprisoned, but he managed to escape to Amsterdam.

In 1695, William settled a large part of the confiscated Irish estates of James II, which had become the property of Mary II, his late wife, on Elizabeth. Parliament revoked this grant in 1700.

On 25 November 1695, Elizabeth was married to her cousin, Lord George Hamilton, the fifth son of the 3rd Duchess of Hamilton. A few weeks later, on 3 January, he was honoured with the titles Earl of Orkney, Viscount of Kirkwall, and Baron Dechmont. Elizabeth, now the Countess of Orkney, served her husband's interests with great skill, and the marriage proved a happy one.

Later in 1696 she founded Midleton College, a grammar school in County Cork, Ireland.

Lady Orkney retained a degree of social importance in the Hanoverian era, and was hostess to George I and George II at her estate at Cliveden, Buckinghamshire. She died in London on 19 April 1733.

== Family ==
Elizabeth was a first cousin of Barbara Palmer, 1st Duchess of Cleveland, a mistress of Charles II, as their fathers were brothers. Her paternal aunt was Anne Douglas, Countess of Morton, the godmother and governess of Henrietta of England, Duchess of Orléans. Her brother was Edward Villiers, 1st Earl of Jersey, whose great-grandson married Frances Twysden, yet another royal mistress.

== Issue ==
By George Hamilton, 1st Earl of Orkney, son of Anne Hamilton, 3rd Duchess of Hamilton and William Hamilton, Duke of Hamilton, Elizabeth Villiers had three daughters, the eldest of whom inherited her husband's estate and title:

- Lady Anne Hamilton (1696–1756), suo jure Countess of Orkney, married her cousin William O'Brien, 4th Earl of Inchiquin (1700 – 18 July 1777) on 29 March 1720
- Lady Frances Hamilton (1700–1772), married Thomas Lumley-Saunderson, 3rd Earl of Scarbrough
- Lady Henrietta Hamilton (1702–1732), married John Boyle, 5th Earl of Cork
