= Barbara Villiers, Countess of Jersey =

English Jacobite peeress (1663–1735)

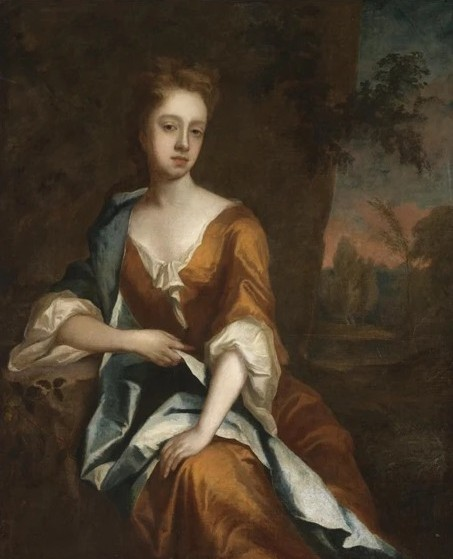
- Barbara Chiffinch, Countess of Jersey, studio of Godfrey Kneller, c.1690
- Born: 1663
- Died: 1735 (aged 71–72)
- Spouse: Edward Villiers, 1st Earl of Jersey
- Issue: 3, including William Villiers, 2nd Earl of Jersey
- Father: William Chiffinch
- Mother: Barbara Nunn

Barbara Villiers, Countess of Jersey (née Chiffinch; 1663–1735) was an English Jacobite peeress and courtier, who married into the Villiers family.

== Biography ==
Lady Jersey was born Barbara Chiffinch, the only child of William Chiffinch (1602–1691), Keeper of the Privy Closet and a confidant of King Charles II, and his wife Barbara Nunn. On 17 December 1681, at the age of 18 she married Edward Villiers, who in 1691 was created Viscount Villiers and in 1697 was made Earl of Jersey. Between 1698 and 1699 she accompanied her husband on his diplomatic posting to France as ambassador. She was a devout Roman Catholic and, following her husband's dismissal from office in 1704, she became a go-between in several Jacobite schemes, likely being the immediate cause of her husband being implicated in Stuart plots.

Following the death of her husband in 1711, Lady Jersey took her younger son Henry to France, for the express purpose of having him raised in the Catholic faith, to which she strongly adhered. This caused something of a scandal in England, as Henry was a minor and a royal ward. She joined the exiled James Francis Edward Stuart at his court at the Château de Saint-Germain-en-Laye. In recognition of her loyalty to the House of Stuart, Lady Jersey was created suo jure Countess of Jersey in the Jacobite peerage by James in April 1716. As her son, William Villiers, was created Jacobite Earl of Jersey at the same time, it is likely that Lady Jersey's title was granted as a life peerage. She died in Paris in 1735; her will, dated 1711, was proved on 26 February 1735/6.

Peerage of England
New creation	— TITULAR — Countess of Jersey; Jacobite peerage 1716–1735	Likely a life peerage
