= Sir Cholmeley Dering, 4th Baronet =

British politician

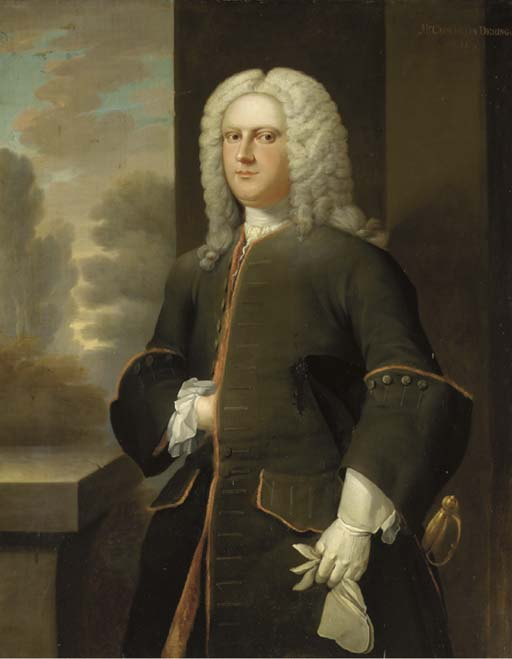
Sir Cholmeley Dering, 4th Baronet, painting by Michael Dahl

Sir Cholmeley Dering, 4th Baronet (23 June 1679 – 9 May 1711) was an English Tory politician who sat in the English and British House of Commons from 1705 to 1711. He was killed in a duel after a fight at dinner.

== Early life ==
Dering was the eldest son of Sir Edward Dering, 3rd Baronet of Surrenden in Pluckley, Kent by Elizabeth Cholmeley, daughter of Sir William Cholmeley, 2nd Baronet of Whitby, Yorkshire. Cholmeley Dering was ten years old when he succeeded his father as baronet in 1689. On 17 July 1704 he married Mary Fisher, the only child of Edward Fisher, merchant of Mitcham, and of his wife Ellen Norton, daughter of Richard Norton.

== Career ==
Dering was elected at the top of the poll as Tory MP for Kent at the 1705 English general election. He voted against the Court candidate for Speaker on 25 October 1705. At the 1708 British general election, he was defeated at Kent. However, he was returned as MP for Saltash at a by-election on 7 December 1708. In the following year, he was arrested at a tavern near the Royal Exchange together with three political colleagues who would later become members of the hard-drinking Tory club, the Band of Brothers. In 1710, he followed the party line, voting against the impeachment of Dr Sacheverell. At the 1710 British general election he was elected for both Saltash and Kent, and chose to sit for Kent.

== Death and legacy ==
Dering was dining with others at an inn near Hampton Court on 7 May 1711 when he became involved in an argument with Colonel Richard Thornhill. They came to blows and in the ensuing struggle Dering kicked out several of Thornhill's teeth. Their companions broke up the fight, but Thornhill afterwards sent Dering a note challenging him to a duel at Tothill Fields in Westminster on the morning of 9 May.

The duel was with pistols, both being fired but only Dering was hit and he died soon after. Thornhill was tried for murder but convicted of the lesser offence of manslaughter, in light of the original provocation. The duel was notable for being the first fought with pistols in London; at the time duels typically used swords.

The incident is recorded by Jonathan Swift in his Journal to Stella and was alluded to by Richard Steele in The Spectator. Thornhill was murdered on Turnham Green on 20 August the same year, by two men who allegedly invoked Dering's name as they killed him.

Dering's wife, Mary, died in 1707 aged only 20, perhaps as a result of the birth of their younger son Cholmeley. Dering and his wife had at least two children:

- Sir Edward Dering, 5th Baronet who succeeded to the baronetcy
- Cholmeley Dering

== See also ==
- List of famous duels

Parliament of England
Preceded by Sir Thomas Hales; Sir Francis Leigh	Member of Parliament for Kent; 1705–1707; With: Viscount Villiers	Succeeded by Parliament of Great Britain
Parliament of Great Britain
Preceded by Parliament of England	Member of Parliament for Kent; 1707–1708; With: Viscount Villiers	Succeeded by Sir Thomas Palmer; Sir Stephen Lennard
Preceded by James Buller; Alexander Pendarves	Member of Parliament for Saltash; 1708–1710; With: Alexander Pendarves	Succeeded by Alexander Pendarves; Jonathan Elford
Preceded by Sir Thomas Palmer, Bt; David Polhill	Member of Parliament for Kent; 1710–1711; With: Percival Hart	Succeeded by Percival Hart; Sir William Hardres
Baronetage of England
Preceded by Edward Dering	Baronet (of Surrenden Dering); 1689–1711	Succeeded by Edward Dering
