= Sir Thomas Palmer, 4th Baronet, of Wingham =

British landowner and Whig politician

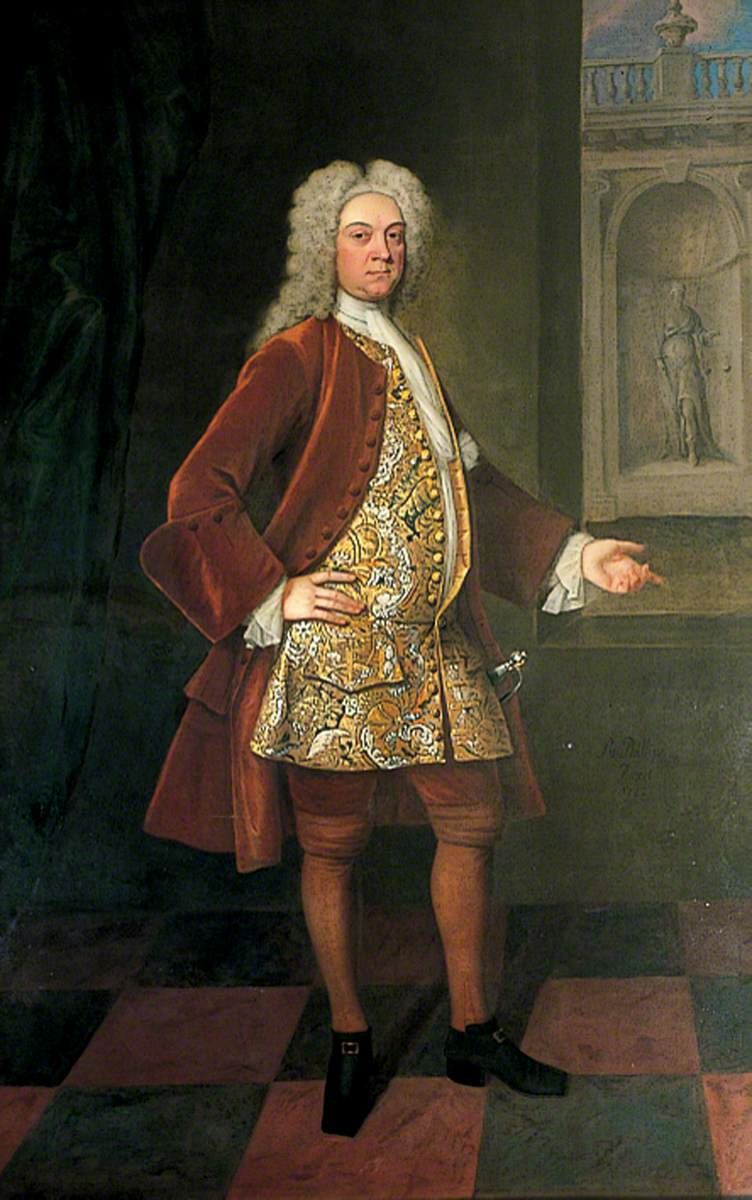
Sir Thomas Palmer by Richard Phillips c.1722 (Guildhall Museum, Rochester)

Sir Thomas Palmer, 4th Baronet, of Wingham (5 July 1682 – 8 November 1723) was a British landowner and Whig politician who sat in the House of Commons between 1708 and 1723.

== Early life ==
Palmer was the eldest son of Herbert Palmer of Wingham, Kent and his wife Dorothy Pincheon, daughter of John Pincheon of Writtle, Essex, and was baptized on 5 July 1682. His grandfather was Sir Thomas Palmer, 2nd Baronet.

He was educated at Canterbury School and Sutton School, Kent and was admitted at Caius College, Cambridge in 1699.

=== Marriage ===
On 18 November 1700, he married Elizabeth Marsham, daughter of Sir Robert Marsham, 4th Baronet. He succeeded to the baronetcy on the death of his uncle Sir Henry Palmer, 3rd Baronet on 19 September 1706.

Arms of Palmer of Wingham: Or, two bars gules each charged with three trefoils of the first in chief a greyhound currant sable

== Career ==
Palmer was returned as a Whig Member of Parliament (MP) for Kent at the 1708 British general election at the top of the poll. He voted for the naturalization of the Palatines in 1709. On 9 December 1709 he was named to the drafting committee for the Riverhill–Tunbridge Wells road bill, and acted as teller for an electoral dispute and for the second reading of the place bill. He voted for the impeachment of Dr Sacheverell. At the 1710 British general election he was defeated and chose not to stand at the 1713 British general election.

Palmer was much affected by death of his wife in July 1714 and kept company with his brother-in-law Sir Robert Marsham who supported his campaign at the 1715 British general election at Rochester. He was returned there unopposed as Whig MP on the Admiralty interest. He consistently supported the Administration, and was rewarded with a place on the commission investigating the army debts at a salary of £500 p.a. He spoke for the repeal of the Occasional Conformity and Schism Acts on 7 January 1719. At the 1722 British general election he was returned again for Rochester in a contest.

== Later life and legacy ==
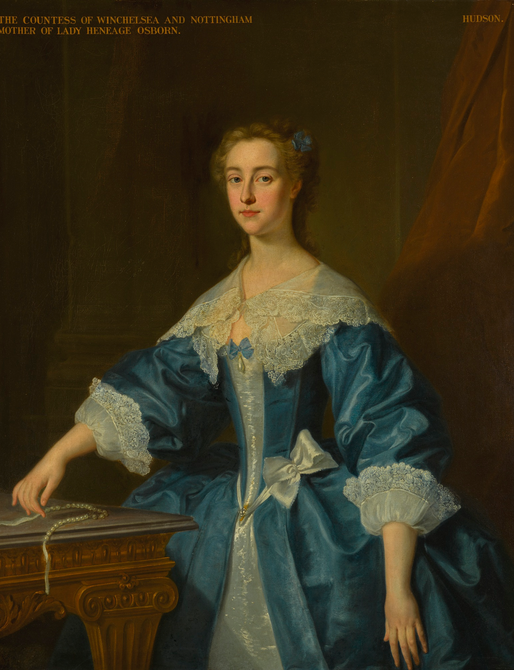
His daughter Mary Palmer, Countess of Winchilsea (1712–1757) by Enoch Seeman

He was described as "a gentleman of a very ancient family and a large estate"

Palmer married, firstly, Elizabeth Marsham (1683–1714) on 18 November 1700; she was the daughter of Sir Robert Marsham, 4th Baronet and sister to Robert Marsham, 1st Baron Romney. Their surviving children and co-heiresses were:

1. Anne Palmer (b. 21 Aug 1709 – Apr 1795) m. Hon. Edward Finch (later Finch-Hatton)
2. Mary Palmer (b. 1712 – d. 8 Aug 1757) m. Daniel Finch, 8th Earl of Winchilsea
3. Elizabeth Palmer (b. 26 Jul 1714 – d. 16 Feb 1742/43) m. Sir Brook Bridges, secondly m. Hon. Charles Fielding

Palmer had fathered an illegitimate child, Herbert, on an actress Susanna Cox whom he married in about 1715. Alexander Pope wrote a scurrilous couplet in reference:

To P—l—r's bed no actress comes amiss
He courts the whole Personae Dramatis.

Susanna died in January 1721 and he married again, in the Fleet, Elizabeth, a "spinster of Covent Garden".

Palmer died on 8 November 1723. By his first wife he had three sons and four daughters of whom only three daughters survived him and became co-heiresses to his estate. He had one daughter by his third wife. He left his widow a life interest in the Wingham estate, which, after her death, was to pass to his son, Herbert. The baronetcy passed to his cousin Charles Palmer.

Parliament of Great Britain
Preceded by Sir Cholmeley Dering, Bt; Viscount Villiers	Member of Parliament for Kent; 1708–1710; With: Sir Stephen Lennard, Bt to Jan 1710; David Polhill from Jan 1710	Succeeded by Sir Cholmeley Dering, Bt; Percival Hart
Preceded by Sir John Leake; William Cage	Member of Parliament for Rochester; 1715–1723; With: Sir John Jennings	Succeeded by Sir Thomas Colby; Sir John Jennings
Baronetage of England
Preceded by Henry Palmer	Baronet (of Wingham); 1706–1723	Succeeded by Charles Palmer
