= Mary O'Brien, 3rd Countess of Orkney =

Scottish noble

The Countess of Orkney
- Born: 1721
- Died: 1790 (aged 68–69)
- Spouse: Murrough O'Brien, 1st Marquess of Thomond
- Issue: Mary FitzMaurice, 4th Countess of Orkney
- Father: William O'Brien, 4th Earl of Inchiquin
- Mother: Anne O'Brien, 2nd Countess of Orkney

Mary O'Brien, 3rd Countess of Orkney (c. 1721 – 1790) was the eldest daughter of Anne O'Brien, 2nd Countess of Orkney, and William O'Brien, 4th Earl of Inchiquin, and Countess of Orkney in her own right.

She was deaf and was married by signs, in 1753, to her first cousin, Murrough O'Brien, fifth Earl of Inchiquin, first Marquess of Thomond, and first Baron Thomond, of Taplow, in England, K.P. She lived with her husband at his seat, Rostellan, near Cork Harbour. She succeeded to the Earldom on 6 December 1756, when her mother died without male issue. By his Lordship, she had an only surviving daughter, Mary, the fourth Countess. The Marquess of Thomond died in consequence of his horse falling with him in Grosvenor Square, on 10 February 1808, in his 85th year. The Countess of Orkney died on 10 May 1790.

Peerage of Scotland
Preceded by Anne Douglas-Hamilton	Countess of Orkney; 1756–1791	Succeeded by Mary FitzMaurice
