= Thomas Chiffinch =

English servant and confidant of Charles II (1600–1666)

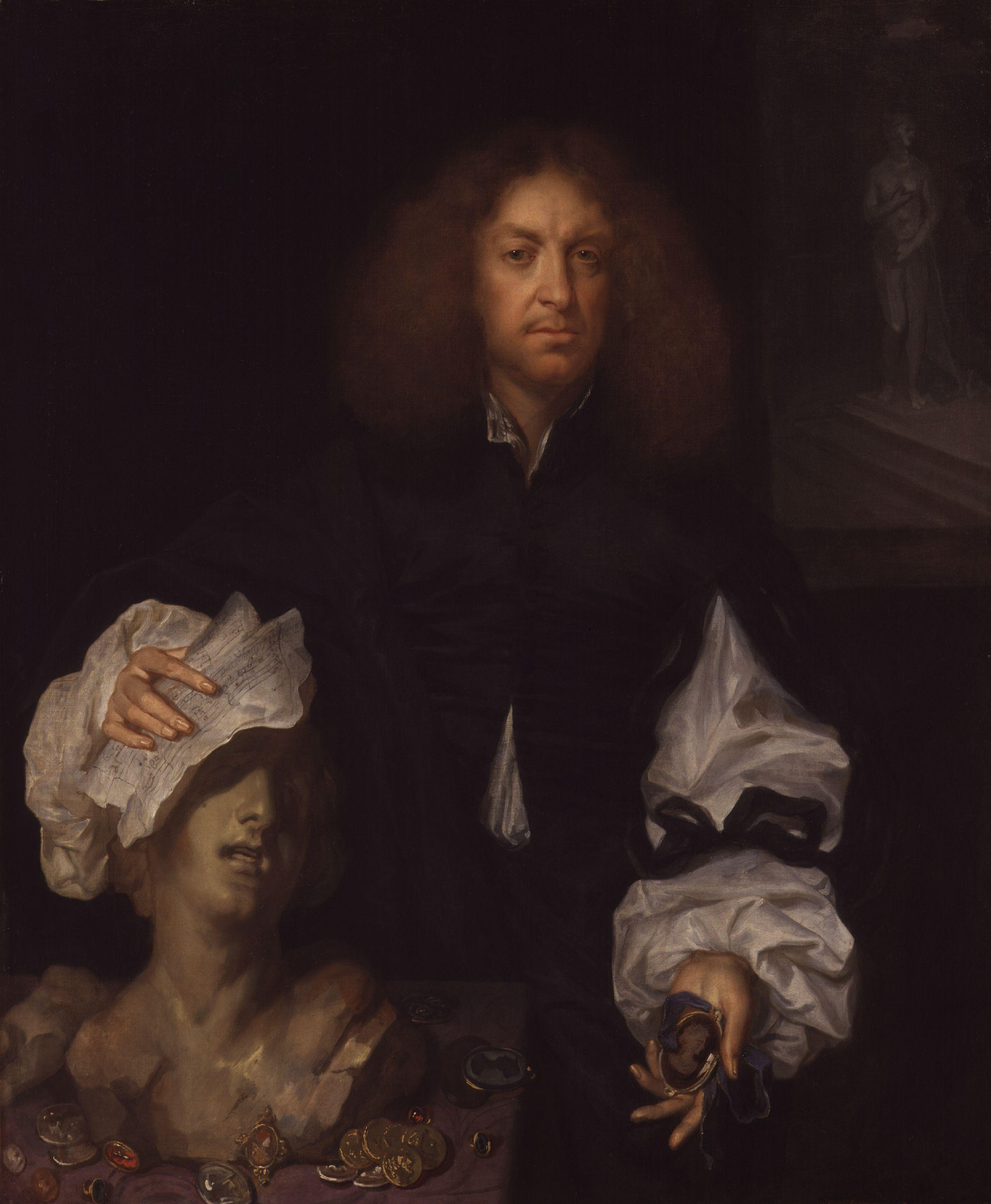
Thomas Chiffinch by Jacob Huysmans

Thomas Chiffinch (1600 – 6 April 1666) was an English page and confidant of Charles II of England.

== Biography ==
In 1641, Chiffinch was brought to the court of Charles I by Bishop Brian Duppa and he became a page of the bedchamber to the king. In 1644 he was given a grant of arms by Sir Edward Walker. From 1645 onwards, Chiffinch was in attendance on Prince Charles, the future Charles II. Chiffinch accompanied Charles abroad in 1646 and remained with him throughout the period of exile from England during the Interregnum (the Commonwealth and the Protectorate).

At the Stuart Restoration in 1660, Chiffinch was appointed Surveyor of the King's Pictures and keeper of the king's jewels. In 1663 the king gave him the office of receiver-general of the revenues of the foreign plantations in America and Africa, being entrusted by the king to deal with important financial matters relating to the income of the royal household.

Chiffinch married Dorothy Thanet of Merionethshire, by whom he had one son. He died on 6 April 1666, the event being recorded in the diary of Samuel Pepys; "The court full this morning of the newes of Tom Cheffin’s death, the king's closett-keeper". He was buried under a gravestone in Westminster Abbey. Chiffinch was succeeded in most of his appointments by his younger brother, William Chiffinch.

== Arms ==
Coat of arms of Thomas Chiffinch

Notes
Granted by the College of Arms, December 1664.
Crest
A demi-dragon Gules holding in the dexter paw a key erased Argent.
Torse
Of the colours.
Escutcheon
Or on a chief embattled Gules three leopards' heads Or langued Azure.
