= Frances Lumley-Saunderson, Countess of Scarbrough =

British courtier

Frances Lumley-Saunderson, Countess of Scarbrough (born Lady Frances Hamilton; c. 1700 – 30 December 1772) was a British courtier.

She was a younger daughter of George Hamilton, 1st Earl of Orkney, and his wife, the former Elizabeth Villiers. Her eldest sister, Anne, succeeded their father in the earldom.

On 27 June 1724, Frances married Thomas Lumley-Saunderson, 3rd Earl of Scarbrough, the third son of Richard Lumley, 1st Earl of Scarbrough and Frances Jones of Aston. They had five children:

- Richard Lumley-Saunderson, 4th Earl of Scarbrough (1725–1782)
- The Hon. George Lumley-Saunderson (d. 11 December 1739)
- Lady Anne Lumley-Saunderson (d. 1807)
- Lady Frances Lumley-Saunderson (d. 1796), married Peter Ludlow, 1st Earl Ludlow in June 1753
- Lady Harriet Lumley-Saunderson (d. 6 November 1747)

Following her marriage, she was a Lady of the Bedchamber to Caroline of Ansbach, then-Princess of Wales (later Queen of Great Britain and Ireland), and to Princess Augusta of Saxe-Gotha (from 1745; also Princess of Wales at the time).

As a Lady of the Bedchamber, the countess received a salary and was in a position of some influence. She remained friendly with Sarah Churchill, Duchess of Marlborough, at times when the latter was out of favour at court.
