= Frances Villiers =

English noblewoman (1633–1677)

- Born: Frances Howard ca. 1633
- Died: 30 November 1677 (aged 43–44); London, England
- Spouse: Edward Villiers (m. 1646)
- Children: 8, including Edward and Elizabeth
- Father: Theophilus Howard
- Relatives: James Howard (brother); George Howard (brother); Henry Howard (brother); George Home (grandfather); Thomas Howard (grandfather); Catherine Howard (grandmother)

Lady Frances Villiers (née Howard; ca.1633 – 30 November 1677) was an English noblewoman and a governess to the future Queens Mary II and Anne.

== Early life ==
Frances was the youngest daughter of Theophilus Howard, 2nd Earl of Suffolk, and his wife, the former Lady Elizabeth Home (daughter of George Home, 1st Earl of Dunbar).

== Career ==
Frances became governess to the two young princesses, the daughters of the Duke of York (the future King James II of England) in 1669, after the death of their mother, Anne Hyde, whose father, Edward Hyde, 1st Earl of Clarendon, was a friend of the Villiers family. She was one of many relatives of Barbara Villiers who benefitted from the position of her niece. She was described as "gentle and kind hearted", and her daughters became the playmates of the princesses. She did not approve of the nature of princess Mary's correspondence with Frances Aspley.

When Princess Mary left for Holland in 1677, as the wife of William of Orange, Frances's eldest son, Edward, went with the couple as Mary's Master of Horse. Frances died of smallpox at St James's Palace, where the household of the princesses was based. She was buried at Westminster Abbey. She was succeeded as royal governess by Henrietta Hyde.

== Marriage and issue ==
In 1646 she married Edward Villiers, the son of the late Sir Edward Villiers, Master of the Mint. Their children were:

- Anne (1651-1688), who married Hans William Bentinck, 1st Earl of Portland, and had children
- Katherine (1652-1709), who married, first, Louis-Jacques, Marquis du Puissar (died 1701) and second, William Villiers, a son of George Villiers, 4th Viscount Grandison, and thus her cousin
- Barbara (1654-1708), Viscountess Fitzharding, who married John Berkeley, 4th Viscount Fitzhardinge, and had two daughters
- Edward Villiers, 1st Earl of Jersey (1656–1711),
- Elizabeth Hamilton, Countess of Orkney (1657-1733)
- Mary (1670-1753), who married William O'Brien, 3rd Earl of Inchiquin, and had children
- Henry (1677-1707)
- Henrietta (died 1720), who married John Campbell, 2nd Earl of Breadalbane and Holland, and had children
