= Edward Villiers (1620–1689) =

English Royalist soldier and courtier (1620–1689)

Sir Edward Villiers
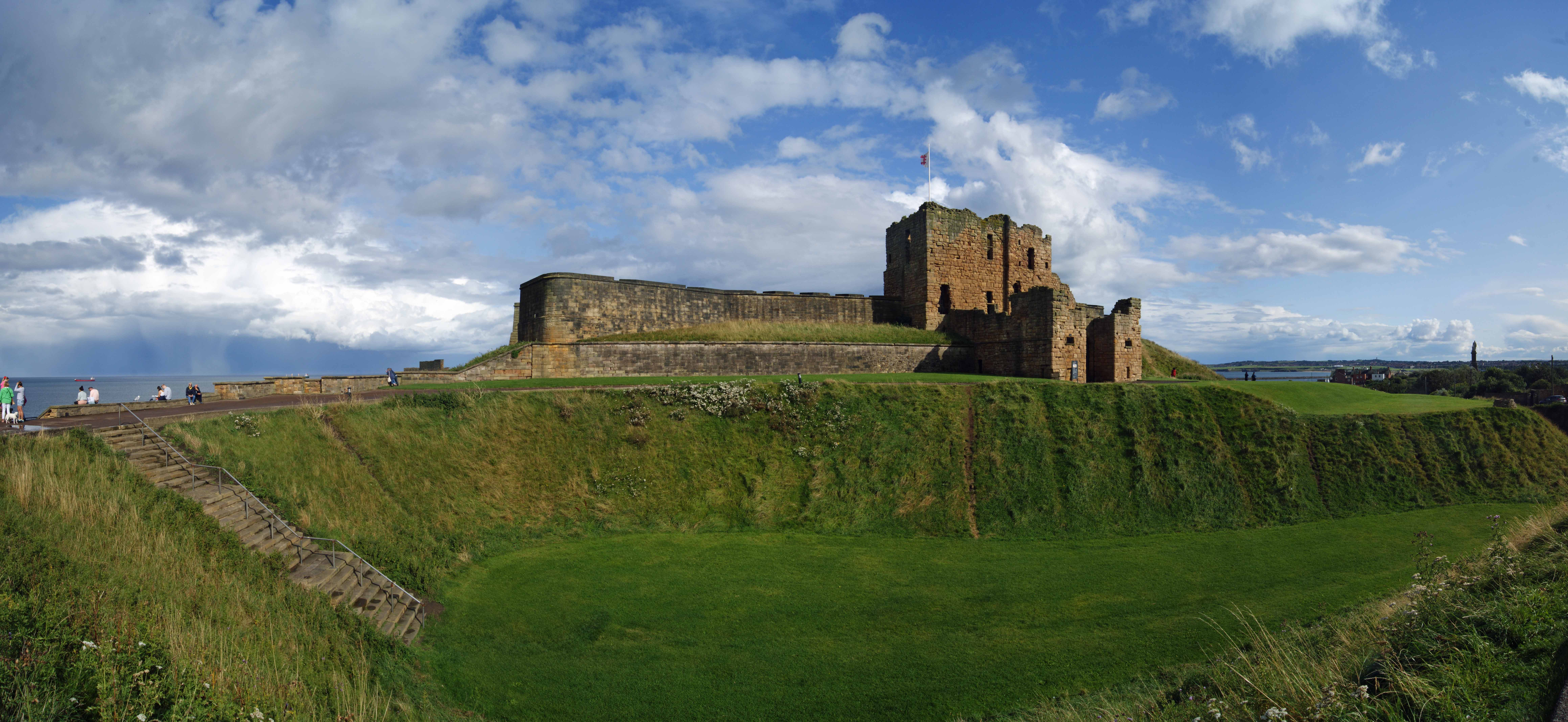
- Tynemouth Castle; Villiers served as Governor from 1662 to 1687

Governor, Tynemouth Castle
- In office 1662–1687

Knight Marshal
- In office 1681–1689

Personal details
- Born: 15 April 1620 (baptised) Brooksby, Leicestershire
- Died: 2 July 1689 (aged 69) Richmond, Surrey
- Resting place: Westminster Abbey
- Party: Royalist
- Spouse(s): (1) Frances Howard (1646–1677) (2) Martha Love (1684–his death)
- Children: Anne (1651–1688); Katherine (1652–1709); Barbara (1654–1708); Edward (1656–1711); Elizabeth (1657–1733); Mary (1670–1753); Henry (1677–1707); Henrietta (?–1720)
- Parent: Sir Edward Villiers (father)
- Occupation: Soldier and courtier

Military service
- Allegiance: England
- Years of service: 1640 to 1648
- Rank: Colonel
- Battles/wars: Wars of the Three Kingdoms; Edgehill; Siege of Reading; First Newbury; Naseby; Oxford

Sir Edward Villiers (April 1620 – July 1689) was an English Royalist soldier and courtier. Part of the powerful Villiers family, he was a friend of Edward Hyde, chief advisor to Charles I and Charles II from 1641 to 1668.

He fought for the Royalists in the First English Civil War and went into exile from 1649 until 1652 when he returned to England. During the Interregnum, he was a member of the Sealed Knot, a Royalist conspiracy group which sought to restore Charles II to the throne.

After the Stuart Restoration in 1660, he received a number of minor offices; more significant were the positions held by his family within the Royal household. His wife was governess to the future queens Mary II and Anne, while three of his daughters accompanied Mary to the Dutch Republic when she married William of Orange in 1677. His eldest son later served both William and Anne as Lord Chamberlain.

Villiers supported the deposition of James II by William and Mary in November 1688 Glorious Revolution. He died in July 1689 and was buried in Westminster Abbey.

== Personal details ==
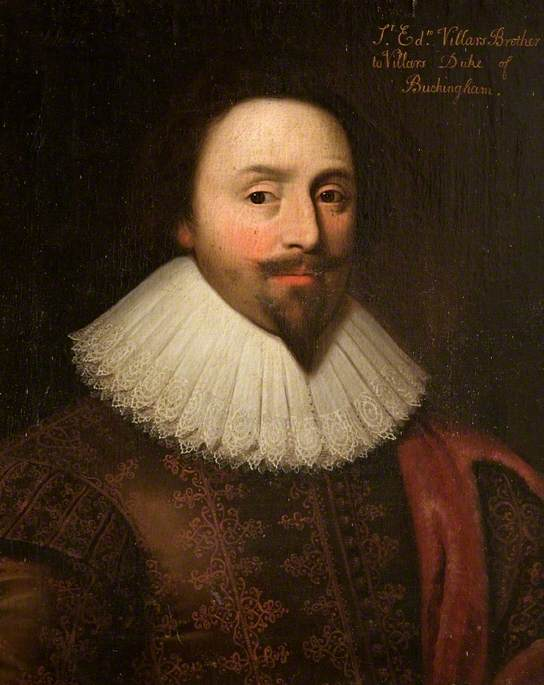
His father, Sir Edward Villiers (1585–1626)

Edward Villiers was born in April 1620, fourth son of Sir Edward Villiers (1585–1626) and Barbara St. John (c. 1592 – 1672). His father was the older half-brother of George Villiers, 1st Duke of Buckingham, favourite of both James VI and I and Charles I, a relationship from which he greatly benefitted. Appointed Lord President of Munster, he died in Cork in 1626, leaving enormous debts; his wife was still repaying them in the 1660s.

Villiers was one of ten children; his siblings included Anne (1610–1654), William (1614–1643), John (1616–1659), George (1618–1699) and Barbara (1618–1681). His elder brother William was killed during the Storming of Bristol in 1643; his daughter Barbara (1640–1709) became mistress to Charles II, by whom she had five children.

In 1646, Edward Villiers married Frances Howard (ca.1633–1677), youngest daughter of the Earl of Suffolk. They had numerous children:

- Anne (1651–1688), married in 1678 William Bentinck, 1st Earl of Portland
- Katherine (1652–1709),
- Barbara (1654–1708),
- Edward (1656–1711),
- Elizabeth (1657–1733),
- Mary (1670–1753), married William O'Brien, 3rd Earl of Inchiquin,
- Henry (1677–1707)
- Henrietta (?–1720), married John Campbell, 2nd Earl of Breadalbane and Holland as his second wife

Frances died of smallpox in November 1677 and Villiers married Martha Love (died 1738) in February 1685; they had no children.

== Career ==
During the 1639 to 1640 Bishops' Wars, Villiers served in a regiment commanded by Lord Goring, one of his colleagues being George Lisle. When the First English Civil War began in August 1642, he was commissioned as a Lieutenant-Colonel in a regiment raised by Sir Charles Gerard, serving at Edgehill and the Siege of Reading, before he was wounded at the First Battle of Newbury in September 1643. He later joined the Royalist field army based in Oxford and fought at Naseby.

By the end of 1645, it was clear the Royalist cause was lost, with its leadership bitterly divided; on 2 November, Villiers wrote to his brother George asking him to sell his house and possessions as he "intended shortly to leave for France". When the war ended in June 1646, he was part of the garrison that surrendered at Oxford; he did not participate in the 1648 Second English Civil War, but escaped to the Dutch Republic along with his cousin George Villiers, 2nd Duke of Buckingham.

After the 1651 Third English Civil War, he returned home and in February 1654 contacted Hyde proposing the establishment of the Sealed Knot, a small group reporting directly to him and responsible for co-ordinating future plots. By excluding Parliamentarian dissidents and Scots Covenanters whose support had been crucial in the Second and Third civil wars, it allowed Hyde to re-establish control over Royalist policy. However, its effectiveness was undermined by a long-standing personal dispute between two of the six leaders, Sir Richard Willis and Lord Belasyse.

In May 1654, an assassination plot against Oliver Cromwell was uncovered, organised by Villiers' former colleague Sir Charles Gerard. Willis and Villiers were arrested and held for several months; reportedly believing he had been betrayed by Belasyse, Willis later became a double agent working for Cromwell's spymaster, John Thurloe. By 1658, the group had largely been superseded, while Villiers had alienated Hyde by his poor judgement, and played little part in the 1660 Stuart Restoration.

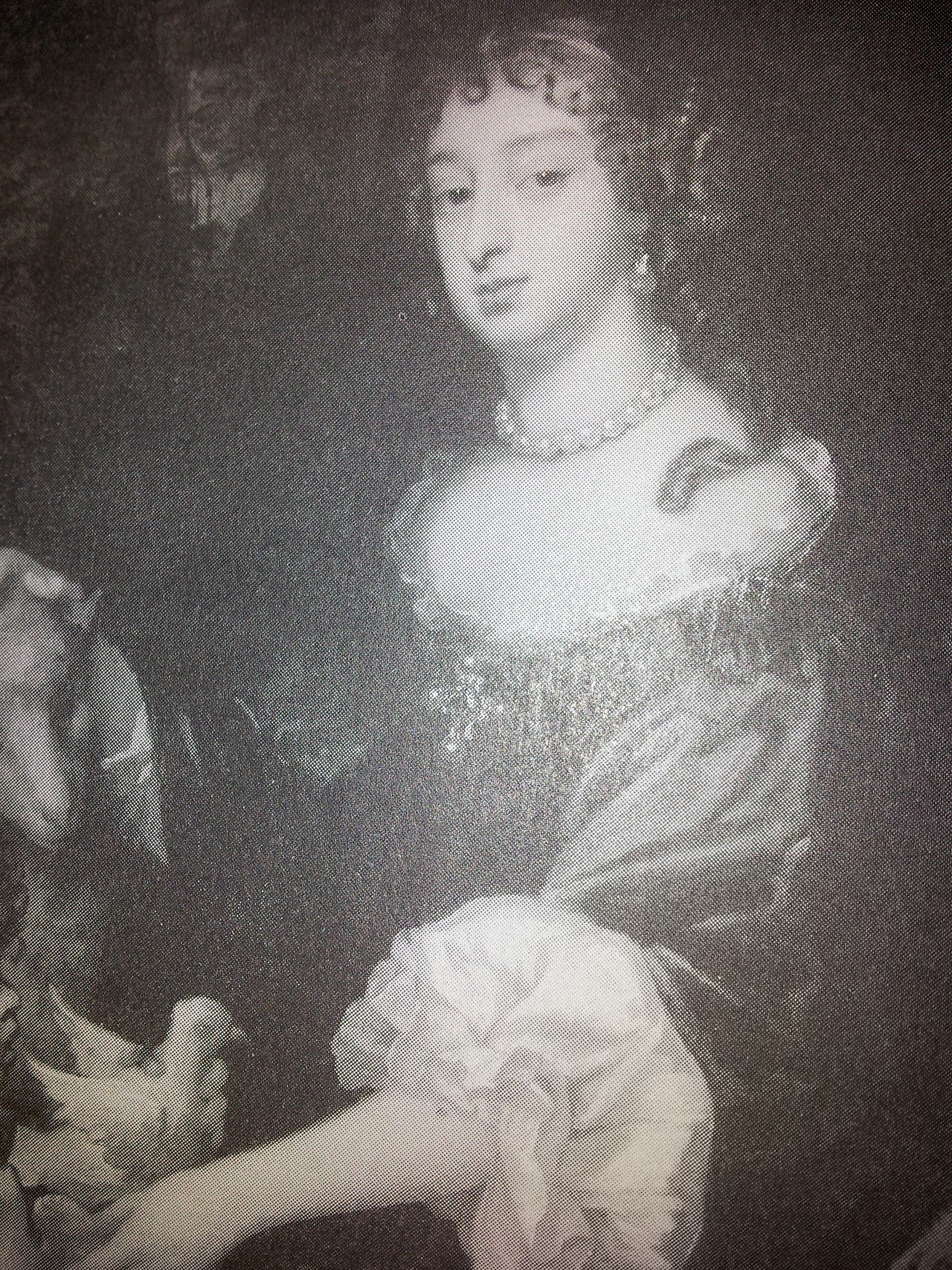
His daughter Elizabeth Villiers, mistress to William III 1680-1695

In 1661, he was appointed Governor of Tynemouth Castle, a post he held until 1687. His most significant reward was the appointment of Frances Villiers as governess to Mary and Anne, daughters of the Duke of York and his first wife Anne Hyde. In November 1677, three of his daughters accompanied Mary to the Netherlands when she married William of Orange, while in February 1678 Charles agreed to support him in the Franco-Dutch War. Villiers was colonel of one of the regiments raised for the war, its officers including his two sons and son-in-law John Berkeley, 4th Viscount Fitzhardinge. The conflict ended in August 1678 before these troops saw active service and the regiment disbanded in early 1679.

Since Charles had no legitimate children, the heir was his Catholic brother James; from 1679 to 1681, English politics was dominated by the Exclusion Crisis, an attempt to bar him from the throne. Villiers remained loyal, and was rewarded with an appointment as Knight Marshal in 1681, a profitable legal position. Elizabeth Villiers began a relationship with William in 1680, and when James became king in February 1685, it was widely publicised, allegedly to cause divisions with Princess Mary, James' heir until the birth of James Francis Edward Stuart in June 1688. Forced to return to London, Elizabeth was allowed back to the Netherlands when Villiers interceded on her behalf, and the affair reportedly continued until 1695, when she married her cousin George Hamilton, 1st Earl of Orkney.

Like the vast majority, Villiers supported William when he landed at Torbay and deposed James in the Glorious Revolution of November 1688; his son later served both William and Anne as Lord Chamberlain. The date of his death is not certain, but he died in Richmond, Surrey, and was buried in Westminster Abbey on 2 July 1689.

== Sources ==
- Barnes, Major R Money (1963). The Soldiers Of London Volume I. Seeley Service And Co Ltd.
- BCW Project. "Colonel Edward Villiers' Regiment of Horse". BCW Project. Archived from the original on 1 March 2021.
- Dalton, Charles (1892). English Army Lists and Commission Registers 1661-1714: Volume I. Eyre & Spottiswoode.
- Grose, Clyde (1924). "The Anglo-Dutch Alliance of 1678". The English Historical Review. 39 (155). JSTOR 552119.
- Herman, Eleanor (2005). Sex with Kings: 500 Years of Adultery, Power, Rivalry, and Revenge. William Morrow. ISBN 978-0060585440.
- Jones, Serena (2021). No Armour But Courage: Colonel Sir George Lisle, 1615-1648. Helion Books. ISBN 978-1914059575.
- Madden, Sir Frederic; Bandinell, Rev Bulkeley; Gough, John (1834). Collectanea topographica et genealogica, Volume VII.
- Roberts, Stephen (2009). "Sealed Knot (1653–1659)". Oxford Dictionary of National Biography (online ed.). Oxford University Press. doi:10.1093/ref:odnb/98250. (Subscription, Wikipedia Library access or UK public library membership required.)
- Royle, Trevor (2004). Civil War: The Wars of the Three Kingdoms 1638–1660 (2006 ed.). Abacus. ISBN 978-0-349-11564-1.
- Thrush, Andrew (2004). "Villiers, Sir Edward(c. 1585–1626)". Oxford Dictionary of National Biography (online ed.). Oxford University Press. doi:10.1093/ref:odnb/28288. (Subscription, Wikipedia Library access or UK public library membership required.)
- Westminster Abbey. "Villiers Family". Westminster Abbey.
- Wynne, SM (2004). "Palmer [née Villiers], Barbara, countess of Castlemaine and suo jure duchess of Cleveland". Oxford Dictionary of National Biography (online ed.). Oxford University Press. doi:10.1093/ref:odnb/28285. (Subscription, Wikipedia Library access or UK public library membership required.)
