= Percival Hart =

English politician

Percival Hart (7 May 1666 – 27 October 1738) of Lullingstone, Kent was an English politician who sat in the House of Commons in 1710–1715.

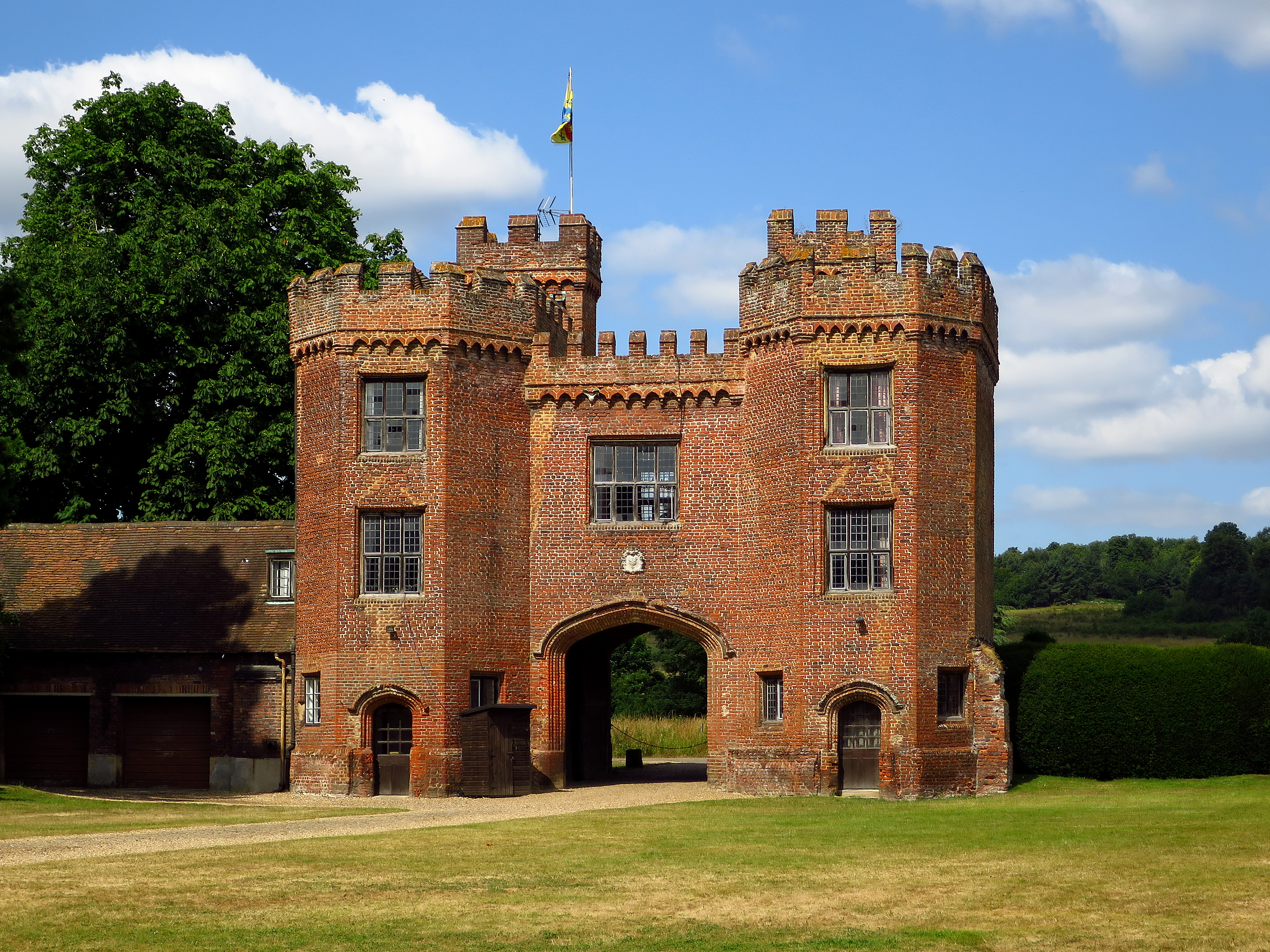
Lullingstone Castle- seat of the Hart-Dyke family

Hart was the son of Percival Hart of Lullingstone and his wife Ann and was educated in the law at the Middle Temple, where he was called to the bar in 1688. He was pricked High Sheriff of Kent for 1706–07.

Hart was elected Member of Parliament (MP) for Kent on 17 October 1710 and held the seat until 8 February 1715.

Hart died aged 72 and was buried in Lullingstone church. He had married in 1689, Sarah, the daughter and coheiress of Henry Dixon of Hilden, Tunbridge, Kent. They had one daughter, Anne, who in turn married John Bluet and Sir Thomas Dyke, 2nd Bt.

Parliament of Great Britain
Preceded by Sir Thomas Palmer, Bt; David Polhill	Member of Parliament for Kent; 1710–1715; With: Sir Cholmeley Dering, Bt 1710–1711; Sir William Hardres, Bt 1711–1713; Sir Edward Knatchbull, Bt 1713–1715	Succeeded by Mildmay Fane; William Delaune
