= William Chiffinch =

English servant to Charles II and James II (died 1691)

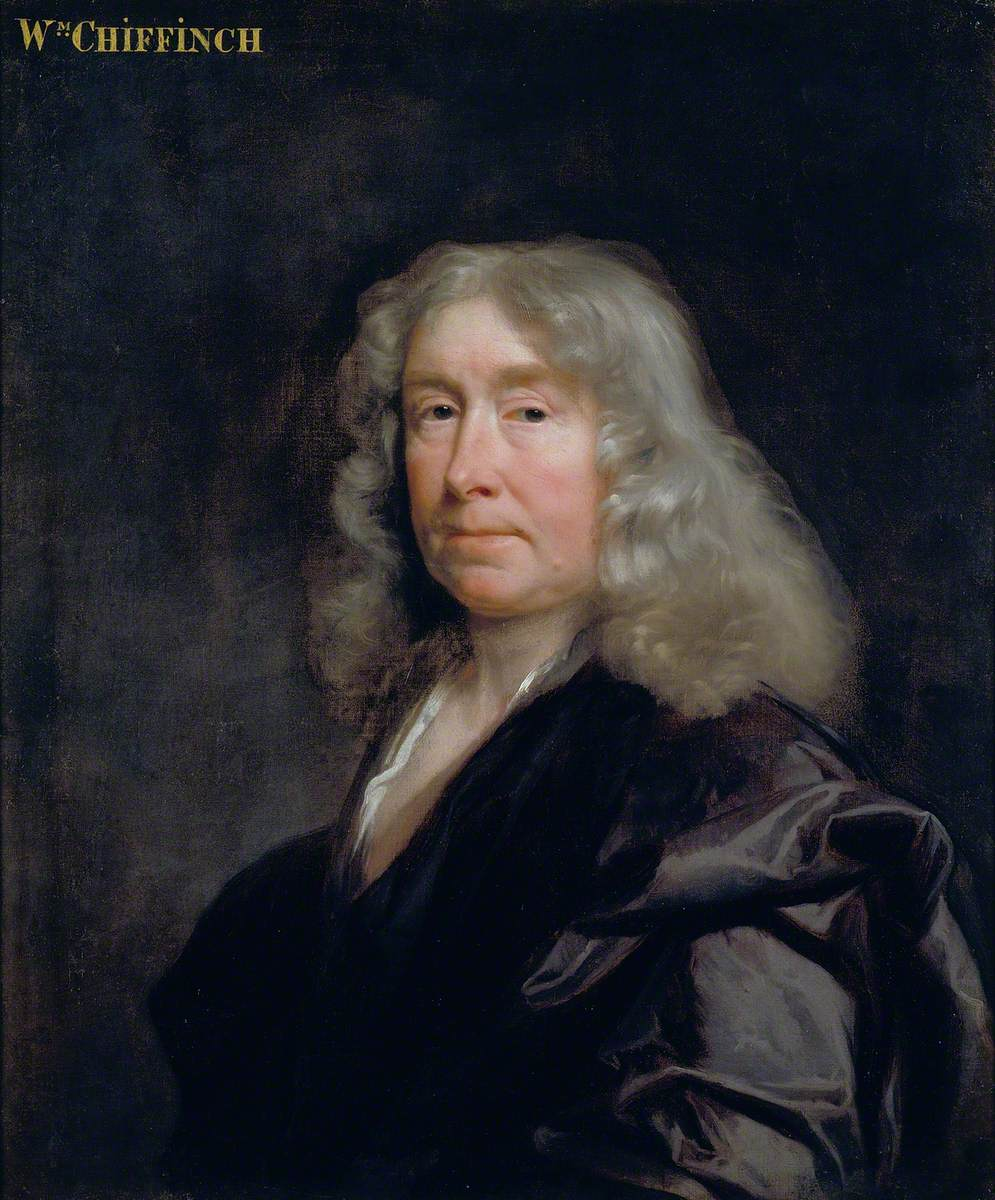
A portrait of William Chiffinch by John Riley

William Chiffinch (died November 1691) was an English royal page and politician. He was described by Joseph Woodfall Ebsworth as "a time-server and libertine, wasteful, unscrupulous, open to bribery and flattery".

== Biography ==
Chiffinch followed his older brother, Thomas, into service as a royal servant and was a page of the backstairs to Queen Catherine of Braganza in 1662. He succeeded to most of his brother's court offices upon Thomas' death in 1666, including being appointed Surveyor of the King's Pictures, page of the bedchamber and Keeper of the Privy Closet. Chiffinch became indispensable to Charles II and was known for his mastery of intrigue; he handled the payments to the king from France under the Secret Treaty of Dover. He was also involved in many court plots, particularly relating to the king's mistresses, and Charles often made use of Chiffinch's Whitehall and Windsor houses for his liaisons. Chiffinch is mentioned frequently in the diary of Samuel Pepys. From 1675 until his death he was Master of the Hawks.

In 1680, he was appointed a justice of the peace for Berkshire. From 1681 he held municipal office in Windsor, Berkshire and in 1685 he was returned unopposed as a Member of Parliament for New Windsor in the Loyal Parliament. In February 1685, Chiffinch was responsible for bringing John Huddleston to Charles' deathbed in order that he could convert to Roman Catholicism. He continued his roles in the royal household under James II until the Glorious Revolution of 1688, after which he fell out of favour with the new regime owing to suspicions of Jacobitism. He was replaced on the Windsor corporation in August 1689 and thereafter lived in relative obscurity. At the time of his death he was reported to be worth £20,000, having benefited greatly from his offices under the crown.

By 1662 he had married Barbara Nunn; their only child, Barbara, married Edward Villiers, 1st Earl of Jersey on 17 December 1681 and became an active Jacobite, being created suo jure Countess of Jersey by James Francis Edward Stuart in 1716.

Parliament of England
Preceded by Samuel Starkey; Richard Winwood	Member of Parliament for New Windsor; 1685–1687; With: Richard Graham	Succeeded by Henry Powle; Sir Christopher Wren
