= Mary FitzMaurice, 4th Countess of Orkney =

British noble

Countess of Orkney
- Born: 4 September 1755
- Died: 30 December 1831 (aged 76)
- Spouse: Thomas Fitzmaurice
- Issue: John FitzMaurice, Viscount Kirkwall
- Father: Murrough O'Brien, 1st Marquess of Thomond
- Mother: Mary O'Brien, 3rd Countess of Orkney

Mary FitzMaurice, 4th Countess of Orkney (née O'Brien; 4 September 1755 – 30 December 1831) was a Scottish peer, the only surviving child of Murrough O'Brien, 1st Marquess of Thomond and Mary O'Brien, 3rd Countess of Orkney.

She was married to the Hon. Thomas FitzMaurice, younger brother of the 1st Marquess of Lansdowne, on 21 December 1777. Their son, born in 1778, was John FitzMaurice, Viscount Kirkwall (who was the father of the 5th Earl of Orkney, Thomas John Hamilton FitzMaurice). She succeeded her mother on 10 May 1791. Her husband died in 1793 with the Countess retaining possession of Cliveden, the family seat of the Earls of Orkney, now owned by the National Trust.

She died in 1831 in Beaconsfield.

Peerage of Scotland
Preceded by Mary O'Brien	Countess of Orkney; 1791–1831	Succeeded by Thomas FitzMaurice
