= William O'Brien, 3rd Earl of Inchiquin =

Irish aristocrat

The Right Honourable William O'Brien PC (Ire)
- The Earl of Inchiquin
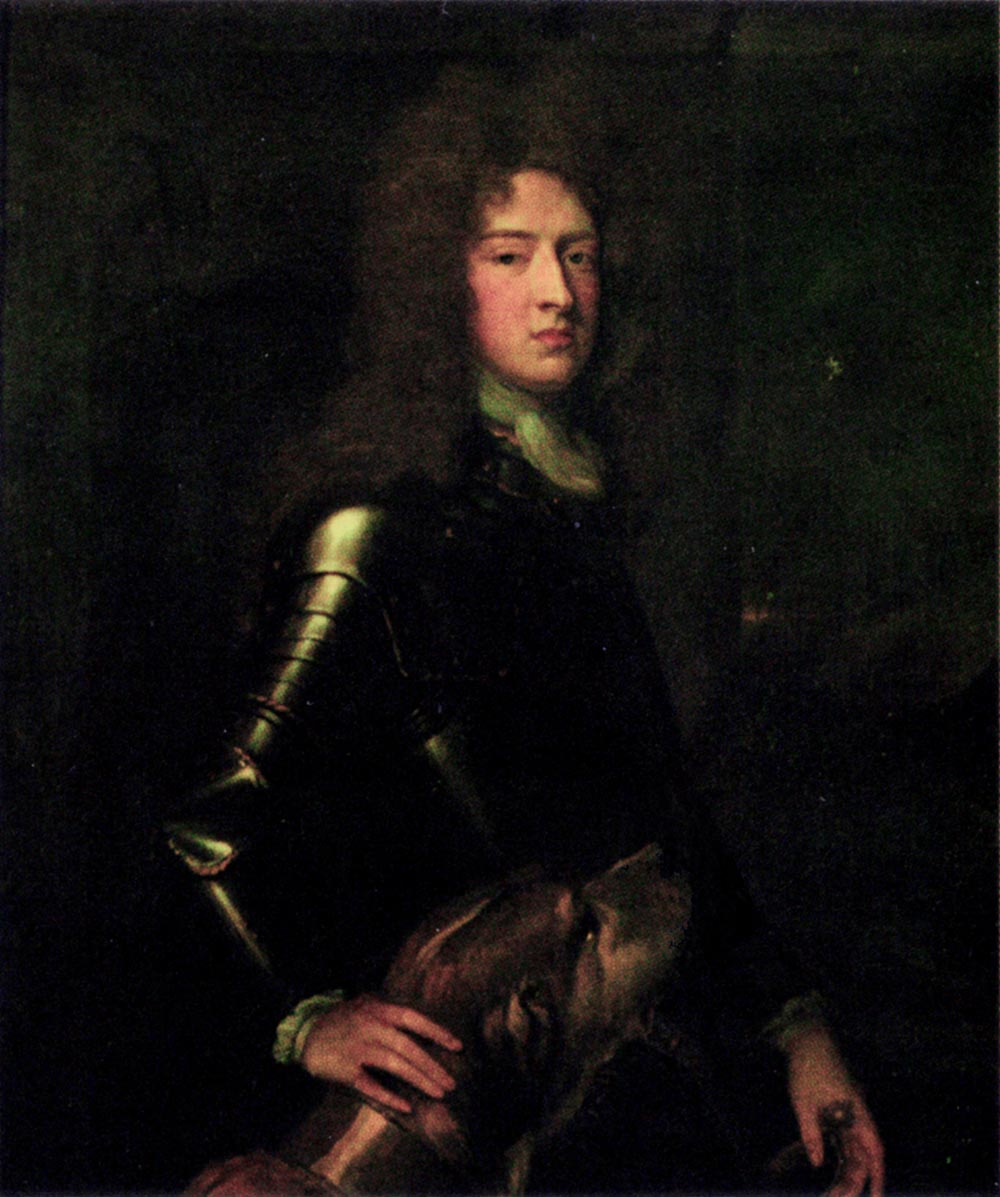
- Tenure: 1692–1719
- Predecessor: William O'Brien, 2nd Earl of Inchiquin
- Successor: William O'Brien, 4th Earl of Inchiquin
- Other titles: Baron O'Brien of Burren; Baron Inchiquin
- Born: 1662
- Died: 24 December 1719 (aged 56–57)
- Spouse: Mary Villiers (before 1719)
- Issue: Donald O'Brien; William O'Brien, 4th Earl of Inchiquin; Lady Mary O'Brien; Lt. Hon. Charles O'Brien; Hon. James O'Brien; Lady Henrietta O'Brien
- Father: William O'Brien, 2nd Earl of Inchiquin
- Mother: Lady Margaret Boyle

William O'Brien, 3rd Baron O'Brien of Burren, 8th Baron & 3rd Earl of Inchiquin PC (Ire)(1662 – 24 December 1719) was an Irish nobleman.

== Life ==
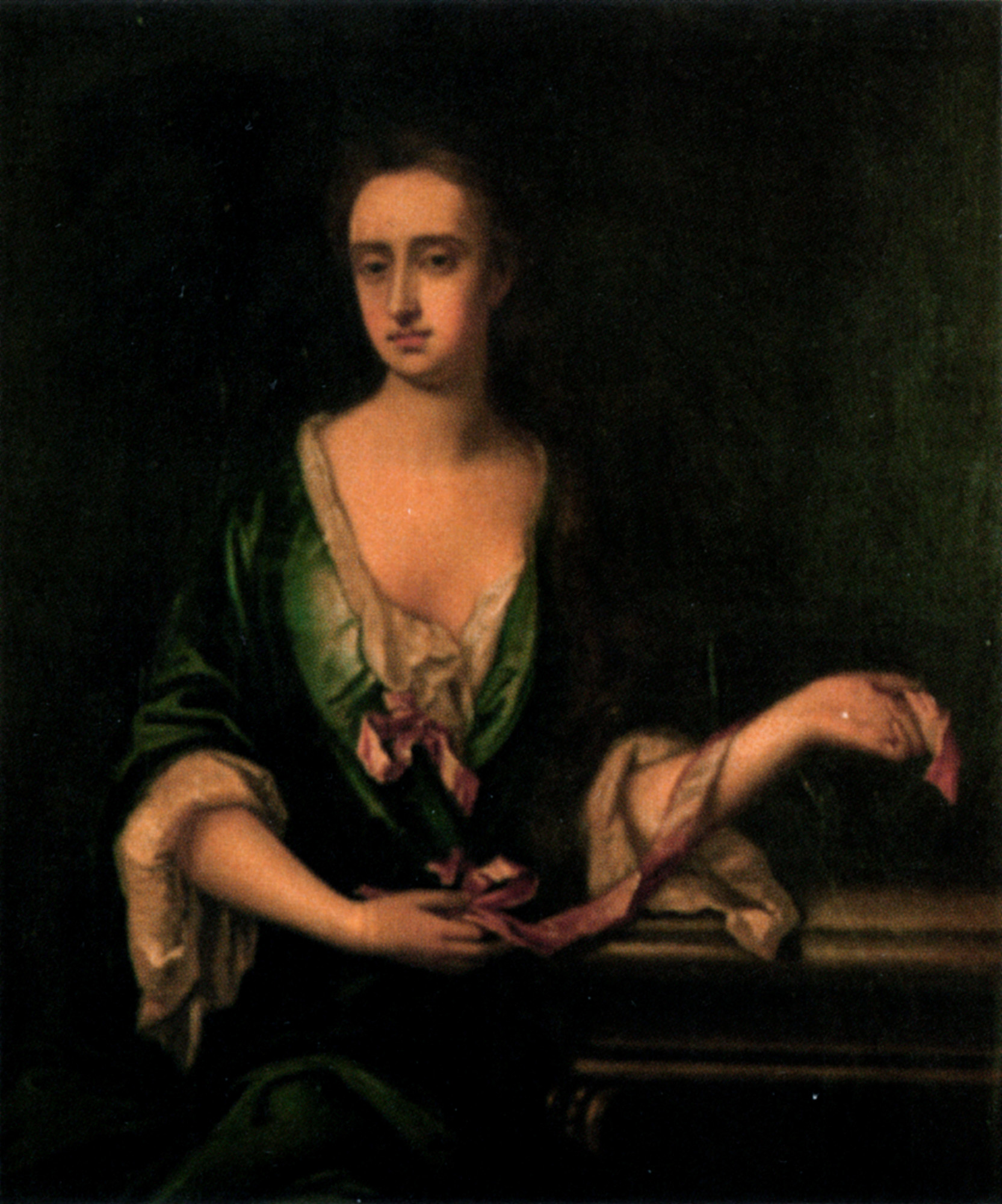
Mary, née Villiers, daughter of Sir Edward Villiers, and sister of the 1st Earl of Jersey, married William, 3rd Earl of Inchiquin. On her wedding Queen Mary, to whom she had been a Maid of Honour, provided a wedding supper at Kensington Palace in London, plus £4,000 in cash and £1,000 in clothing and jewellery.

William O'Brien was the son of William O'Brien, 2nd Earl of Inchiquin and Lady Margaret Boyle, daughter of Margaret Howard, Lady Boyle. He married his first cousin once removed Mary Villiers, daughter of Sir Edward Villiers of Richmond and Frances Howard, Lady Villiers, the youngest daughter of Theophilus Howard, 2nd Earl of Suffolk and Elizabeth Hume.

Like his father, he was attainted in his absence by the Irish Parliament of King James II in 1689. He returned to Ireland the following year with the Williamite army, serving as a Captain of horse in the regiment of Col. Robert Byerley, and saw action at the Battle of the Boyne in 1690. He was appointed Governor of Kinsale by King William III, in 1693 and signed the declaration and association in defence of the King after the assassination attempt made against him in 1697.

He was Privy Councillor to Queen Anne and King George I, Colonel of Foot in 1703 and Mayor of Kilkenny from 1704 to 1705. He was made Governor of County Clare.

== Family ==
Children of William O'Brien, 3rd Earl of Inchiquin and Mary Villiers:

- William O'Brien, 4th Earl of Inchiquin (1700 – 18 July 1777)
- Lady Mary O'Brien, who married Robert FitzGerald, 19th Earl of Kildare, son of Hon. Robert FitzGerald and Mary Clotworthy, on 7 March 1708/9. They had two sons and one daughter.
- Hon. Charles O'Brien Lieut RN
- Hon. James O'Brien (d. 17 December 1771) Married Mary Jephson, daughter of Very Revd William Jephson and Anne Barry. They had three sons and two daughters.
- Lady Henrietta O'Brien (d. 1730) Married Robert Sandford in August 1717. They had one daughter.

The 3rd Earl of Inchiquin also had a son out of wedlock:

- Donald O'Brien, was born 1689. He later settled in Co. Waterford where he married Sarah Harrigan. Their sons were James O'Brien (d. 1800) and Andrew O'Brien (d. 1798). The latter settled in Baltinglass where he founded a bleach green for the bleaching of cotton goods produced by the Orrs of Stratford-on-Slaney.

Peerage of Ireland
Preceded by William O'Brien	Earl of Inchiquin; 1692–1719	Succeeded by William O'Brien
