= George Hamilton, 1st Earl of Orkney =

British army officer (1666–1737)

Field Marshal The Right Honourable The Earl of Orkney KT
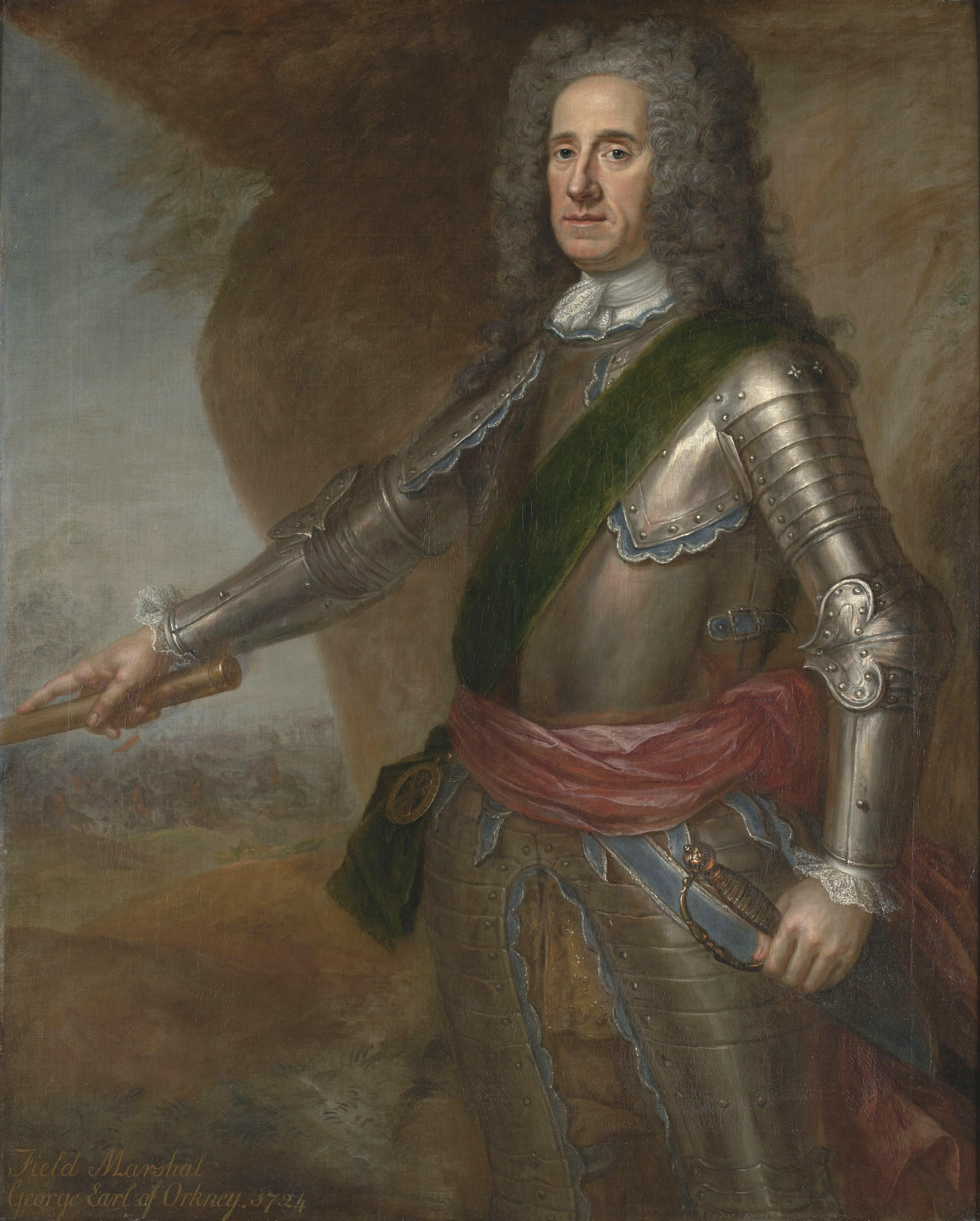
- Portrait by Martin Maingaud, 1724
- Born: 9 February 1666; Hamilton Palace, South Lanarkshire, Kingdom of Scotland
- Died: 29 January 1737 (aged 70); London, England, Kingdom of Great Britain
- Burial place: Taplow Court, Buckinghamshire, England
- Spouse: Elizabeth Villiers
- Children: Anne O'Brien, 2nd Countess of Orkney; Frances Lumley-Saunderson, Countess of Scarbrough; Henrietta Boyle, Countess of Cork
- Parents: William Douglas, 1st Earl of Selkirk (father); Anne Hamilton, 3rd Duchess of Hamilton (mother)
- Military career
- Allegiance: Scotland; Great Britain
- Branch: Scots Army; British Army
- Rank: Field Marshal
- Conflicts: Williamite War in Ireland; Nine Years' War; War of the Spanish Succession
- Awards: Knight of the Order of the Thistle

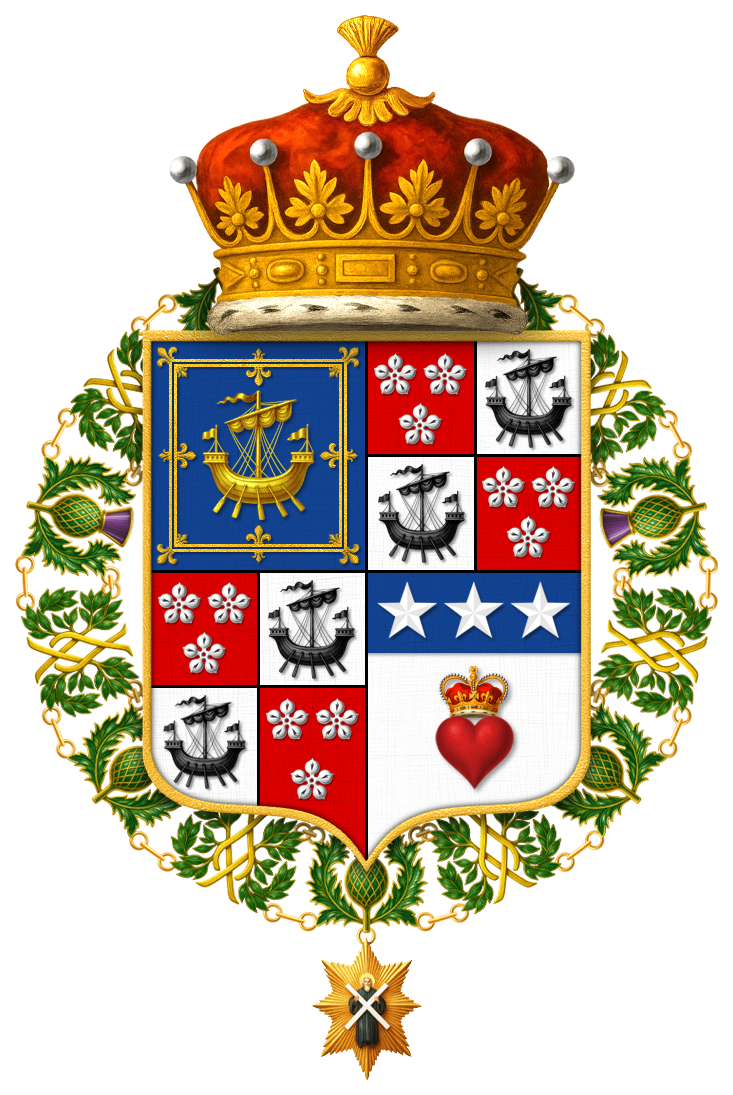
Shield of arms of George Hamilton, 1st Earl of Orkney, surmounting the collar of the Order of the Thistle

Field Marshal George Hamilton, 1st Earl of Orkney, KT (February 1666 – 29 January 1737), styled Lord George Hamilton from 1666 to 1696, was a British army officer and the first officer of the British Army to be promoted to the rank of field marshal. After commanding a Scots Army regiment for the cause of William of Orange during the Williamite War in Ireland, he commanded another Scottish regiment in the Low Countries during the Nine Years' War.

Hamilton led the final assault at the Battle of Blenheim attacking the village churchyard with eight infantry battalions and then receiving the surrender of its French defenders during the War of the Spanish Succession. He also led the charge of fifteen infantry battalions in an extremely bloody assault on the French entrenchments at the Battle of Malplaquet. In later life, Hamilton became a Lord of the Bedchamber to George I and was installed as governor of Edinburgh Castle.

== Early life ==
Born the son of William Douglas, 1st Earl of Selkirk and Anne, 3rd Duchess of Hamilton, Hamilton was commissioned into the His Majesty's Royal Regiment of Foot, a regiment for which his uncle, Lord Dumbarton, held the colonelcy, on 9 May 1684.

== Military career ==
=== Ireland and the Low Countries ===
Hamilton became a lieutenant colonel of Lloyd's Regiment of Enniskillen Foot in June 1689 and, having been promoted to brevet colonel, commanded the regiment at the Battle of the Boyne in July 1690, at the siege of Athlone in June 1691 and at the Battle of Aughrim, where he was wounded, in July 1691 during the Williamite War in Ireland. He also commanded the regiment at the siege of Limerick in October 1691 and then became colonel of the Royal Fusiliers in January 1692 before fighting with that regiment at the Battle of Steenkerque in August 1692 in the Low Countries during the Nine Years' War. Rewarded with the colonelcy of the 1st Regiment of Foot in late 1692, he participated in further battles in Ireland before returning to the continent to fight at the Battle of Landen in July 1693 and at the siege of Namur, where he was wounded, in July 1695 during the latter stages of the Nine Years' War.

On 25 November 1695 Hamilton married Elizabeth Villiers, a favourite and perhaps former mistress of William III, and on 3 January 1696 he was created Earl of Orkney, Viscount Kirkwall, and Baron Dechmont in the Peerage of Scotland. Shortly thereafter he acquired the estates of Taplow Court and Cliveden. He became Governor of Virginia in 1698 but appears never to have visited the colony.

=== War of the Spanish Succession ===
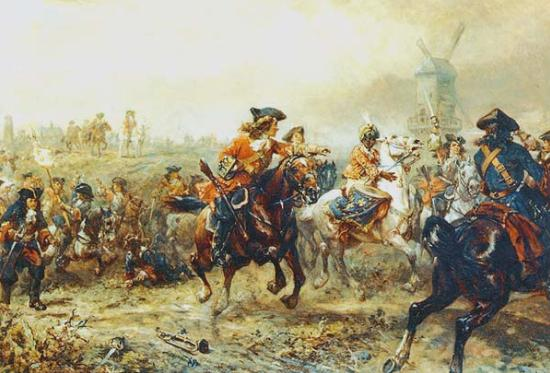
The Battle of Ramillies where Hamilton began a diversion and then turned the manoeuvre into a highly successful assault

Promoted to major general on 9 March 1702, Hamilton fought under John Churchill, 1st Duke of Marlborough at the siege of Stevensweert in October 1702 during the War of the Spanish Succession. Promoted to lieutenant general on 1 January 1704, he was appointed a Knight of the Order of the Thistle later that year. He led the final assault at the Battle of Blenheim attacking the village churchyard with eight battalions of men and then receiving the surrender of its French defenders in August 1704. After marching his column from the Moselle, he relieved the besieged city of Liège in June 1705.

Hamilton led a diversion at the Battle of Ramillies but turned the manoeuvre into a highly successful assault, from which he had to withdraw before leading the relentless pursuit of the defeated French troops in May 1706. He also took part in the Siege of Menin in July 1706 and then played a major role at the Battle of Oudenarde in July 1708. He also saw action at the passage of the Scheldt in November 1708, fought at the siege of Tournai in June 1709 and led the charge of fifteen infantry battalions in an extremely bloody assault on the French entrenchments at the Battle of Malplaquet in September 1709. Promoted to general of foot in 1710, Hamilton was appointed Lord Lieutenant of Lanarkshire in 1711. He returned to the continent in 1712 and continued to serve in the Army commanded by the Duke of Ormonde besieging Douai and then Bouchain until 1713.

== Later life ==
Hamilton became a Lord of the Bedchamber to George I and was installed as Governor of Edinburgh Castle in 1714. He also sat in the House of Lords as a Scottish representative peer. Promoted to field marshal (the first-ever promotion to this rank) on 31 January 1735, he commissioned the building of a temple at his Buckinghamshire home, Cliveden, by the architect Giacomo Leoni later that year.

Hamilton died at his home at Albemarle Street in London on 29 January 1737 and was buried at Taplow Court. In 1733 Michael Rysbrack, a sculptor from Antwerp, carved a marble bust of Hamilton in the form of a Roman centurion. As a boy, Rysbrack would have witnessed Hamilton's unopposed entry into Antwerp shortly after his victory at Ramillies. The bust is now in the Victoria and Albert Museum.

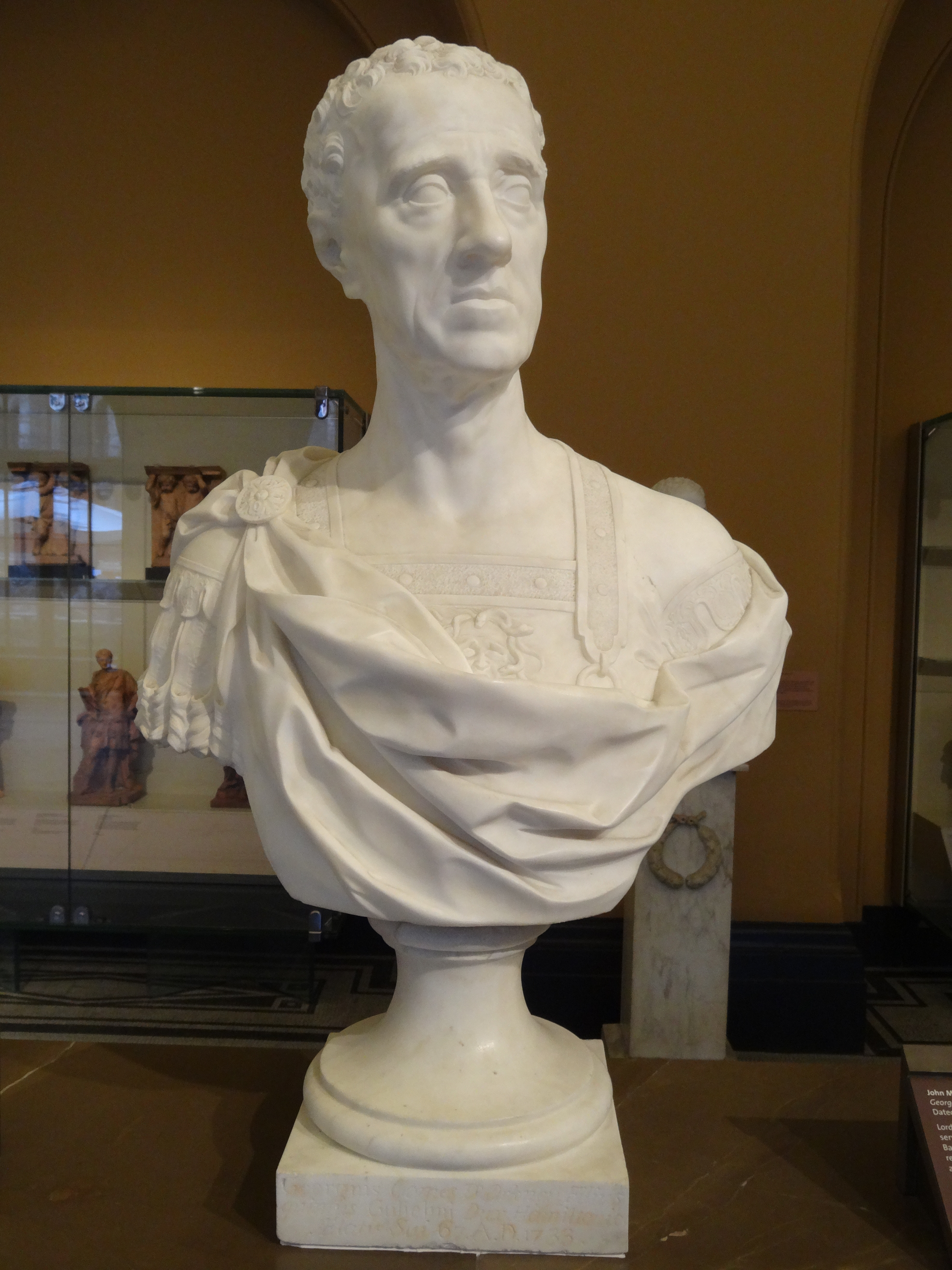
Hamilton as a centurion, 1733, by John Michael Rysbrack

== Family ==
In 1695 Hamilton married Elizabeth Villiers, a former mistress of William III; they had three daughters:

- Lady Anne, suo jure Countess of Orkney, married William O'Brien, 4th Earl of Inchiquin
- Lady Frances, married Thomas Lumley-Saunderson, 3rd Earl of Scarbrough
- Lady Henrietta, married John Boyle, 5th Earl of Cork and Orrery.

== Sources ==
- Balfour-Paul, Sir James (1907). The Scots Peerage IX Vols. Edinburgh.
- Heathcote, Tony (1999). The British Field Marshals 1736–1997. Pen & Sword Books Ltd. ISBN 0-85052-696-5.
- Mosley, Charles (2003). Burke's Peerage, Baronetage & Knightage, 107th edition, 3 Volumes. Burke's Peerage (Genealogical Books) Ltd. ISBN 978-0971196629.
- Wilson, D (2011). The British Augustan oligarchy in portraiture: Michael Rysbrack and his bust of the Earl of Orkney. The British Art Journal, Volume XI, No. 2.

Peerage of Scotland
New creation	Earl of Orkney; 1695–1737	Succeeded by Anne O'Brien
Military offices
Preceded by The Duke of Marlborough	Colonel of The Ordnance Regiment; January 1692 – July 1692	Succeeded by Edward Fitzpatrick
Preceded by Sir Robert Douglas	Colonel of His Majesty's Royal Regiment of Foot; 1692–1737	Succeeded by James St Clair
Preceded by The Duke of Argyll	Governor of Edinburgh Castle; 1714–1737	Succeeded by The Earl of Selkirk
