= Thomas Lumley-Saunderson, 3rd Earl of Scarbrough =

British peer, British Army officer and diplomat

Thomas Lumley-Saunderson, 3rd Earl of Scarbrough, KB (c. 1691 – 15 March 1752) was a British peer, British Army officer and diplomat.

== Life ==
Born the Hon. Thomas Lumley, he was the third son of Richard Lumley, 1st Earl of Scarbrough and his wife, Frances. He entered the army before 1714, became Colonel of Tyrrell's Regiment of Dragoons in 1715 and a Lieutenant-Colonel in Lord Hinchinbroke's Regiment of Foot in 1717. From 1716 to 1731, he was Clerk of the Council of the Duchy of Lancaster, whilst also Envoy to Portugal from 1722 to 1724.

Lumley is thought to have raped Teresia Constantia Phillips at the age of 12 or 13 under the assumed name of "Thomas Grimes". Phillips herself never realised who her attacker was and intriguingly her later autobiography was dedicated to the 3rd Earl of Scarborough.

Lumley was the (anti-Walpole) Whig Member of Parliament for Arundel from 1722 to 1727 and for Lincolnshire from 1727 to 1740, when he inherited his childless elder brother's titles. In 1723, he assumed the additional surname of Saunderson after inheriting the estate of his maternal cousin, James Saunderson, 1st Earl Castleton and was appointed a Knight Companion of the Order of the Bath in 1725. From 1726 to 1727, he was an Equerry to Frederick, Prince of Wales, to George II from 1727 to 1730 and Treasurer to the Prince of Wales from 1738 to 1751.

On 27 June 1724, Scarbrough married Lady Frances Hamilton, the second daughter and coheiress of George Hamilton, 1st Earl of Orkney. They had two children:

- Richard, styled Viscount Lumley (1725–1782), later 4th Earl of Scarbrough.
- Lady Frances (died 1796), married Peter Ludlow, 1st Earl Ludlow.

Diplomatic posts
Preceded by Henry Worsley	Envoy to Portugal; 1722–1724	Succeeded by Brigadier James Dormer
Parliament of Great Britain
Preceded by Henry Lumley and Joseph Micklethwaite	Member of Parliament for Arundel; 1722–1727; With: Joseph Micklethwaite	Succeeded by Sir John Shelley, Bt. and The Viscount Gage
Preceded by Henry Heron and Robert Vyner	Member of Parliament for Lincolnshire; 1727–1740; With: Robert Vyner	Succeeded by Robert Vyner and Thomas Whichcot
Peerage of England
Preceded by Richard Lumley	Earl of Scarbrough; 1740–1752	Succeeded by Richard Lumley-Saunderson
