= Cholmeley baronets of Whitby (1641) =

Escutcheon of the Cholmeley baronets of Whitby

The Cholmeley baronetcy, of Whitby in the County of York, was created in the Baronetage of England on 16 August 1641 for Hugh Cholmeley, Member of Parliament for Scarborough. During the English Civil War he fought as a Royalist as well as a Parliamentarian. The title descended from father to son until the early death of his grandson, the third Baronet, in 1665. The late Baronet was succeeded by his uncle, the fourth Baronet. He was Member of Parliament for Northampton and Thirsk. He had no sons and on his death in 1689 the title became extinct.

The Cholmeley baronets were members of a junior branch of the Cholmondeley/Cholmeley family headed by the Marquess of Cholmondeley. In 1642 an ancestor of the first Baronet, Montague Cholmeley (born 1615), had a warrant for a baronetcy but the patent was never made out.

== Cholmeley baronets, of Whitby (1641) ==
- Sir Hugh Cholmeley, 1st Baronet (1600–1657)
- Sir William Cholmeley, 2nd Baronet (1625–1663)
- Sir Hugh Cholmeley, 3rd Baronet (c. 1662–1665)
- Sir Hugh Cholmeley, 4th Baronet (1632–1689)
