= Jane Hyde =

Jane Hyde may refer to:

- Jane Hyde, Countess of Clarendon (died 1725), wife of Henry Hyde, 4th Earl of Clarendon
- Jane Capell, Countess of Essex (1694–1724), née Hyde, first wife of William Capell, 3rd Earl of Essex
- Maria Jane Hyde (born 1969), actress and singer
