= Countess of Clarendon =

Countess of Clarendon is a title given to the wife of the Earl of Clarendon. Women who have held the title include:

- Frances Hyde, Countess of Clarendon (1617–1667)
- Flower Backhouse, Countess of Clarendon (died 1700)
- Jane Hyde, Countess of Clarendon (1669–1725)
- Charlotte Villiers, Countess of Clarendon (1721–1790)
- Maria Villiers, Countess of Clarendon (1761–1844)
