= Jane Capell, Countess of Essex =

British court official

The Right Honourable The Countess of Essex
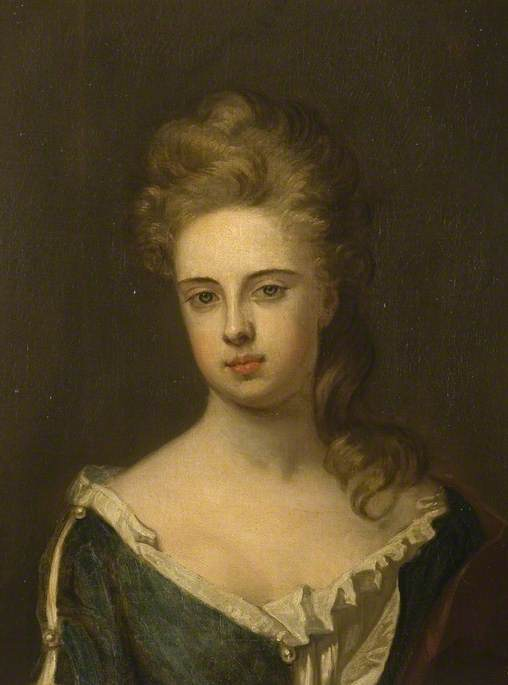
- Portrait of Jane Capell, Countess of Essex, circa 1718 from the studio of Sir Godfrey Kneller (1646–1723)
- Born: 1694
- Died: 1724 (aged 29–30)
- Spouse: William Capell, 3rd Earl of Essex
- Issue: Charlotte Villiers, Countess of Clarendon; Lady Mary Capell
- Father: Henry Hyde, 4th Earl of Clarendon
- Mother: Jane Leveson-Gower

Jane Capell, Countess of Essex (née Hyde; 1694 – January 1724) was a British court official, the first wife of William Capell, 3rd Earl of Essex.

== Biography ==
Jane was born in 1694. She was the daughter of Henry Hyde, 4th Earl of Clarendon, and his wife, the former Jane Leveson-Gower.

She married the Earl of Essex on 27 November 1718.

In 1722, the countess was a Lady of the Bedchamber to Caroline of Ansbach, Princess of Wales. One of her younger sisters was Catherine Hyde, who became Duchess of Queensberry, and her only brother to survive to adulthood was Henry Hyde, Viscount Cornbury.

Following her death in 1724, the earl remarried, his second wife being Lady Elizabeth Russell.

A portrait of the countess was painted by Sir Godfrey Kneller in 1718.

== Family ==
She and her husband had four daughters, including:

- Lady Charlotte Capell (d. 1790), who married Thomas Villiers, 1st Earl of Clarendon, and had children.
- Lady Mary Capell (d. 9 April 1782), married Admiral Hon. John Forbes (a son of George Forbes, 3rd Earl of Granard). They had two daughters, Maria Eleanor Forbes who married John Villiers, 3rd Earl of Clarendon, and Katherine Elizabeth Forbes, who married William Wellesley-Pole, 3rd Earl of Mornington.
