= 2nd Earl of Clarendon =

2nd Earl of Clarendon may refer to:

- Henry Hyde, 2nd Earl of Clarendon (1638–1709)
- Thomas Villiers, 2nd Earl of Clarendon (1753–1824)
