= 4th Earl of Clarendon =

4th Earl of Clarendon may refer to:

- Henry Hyde, 4th Earl of Clarendon of the 1661 creation, (lived 1672–1753)
- George Villiers, 4th Earl of Clarendon of the 1776 creation (lived 1800–1870)
