= 1st Earl of Clarendon =

There have been two men named "1st Earl of Clarendon":

- Edward Hyde, 1st Earl of Clarendon (1609–1674); the title became extinct in 1753.
- Thomas Villiers, 1st Earl of Clarendon (1709–1786).
