= Colclough baronets =

Extinct baronetcy in the Baronetage of Ireland

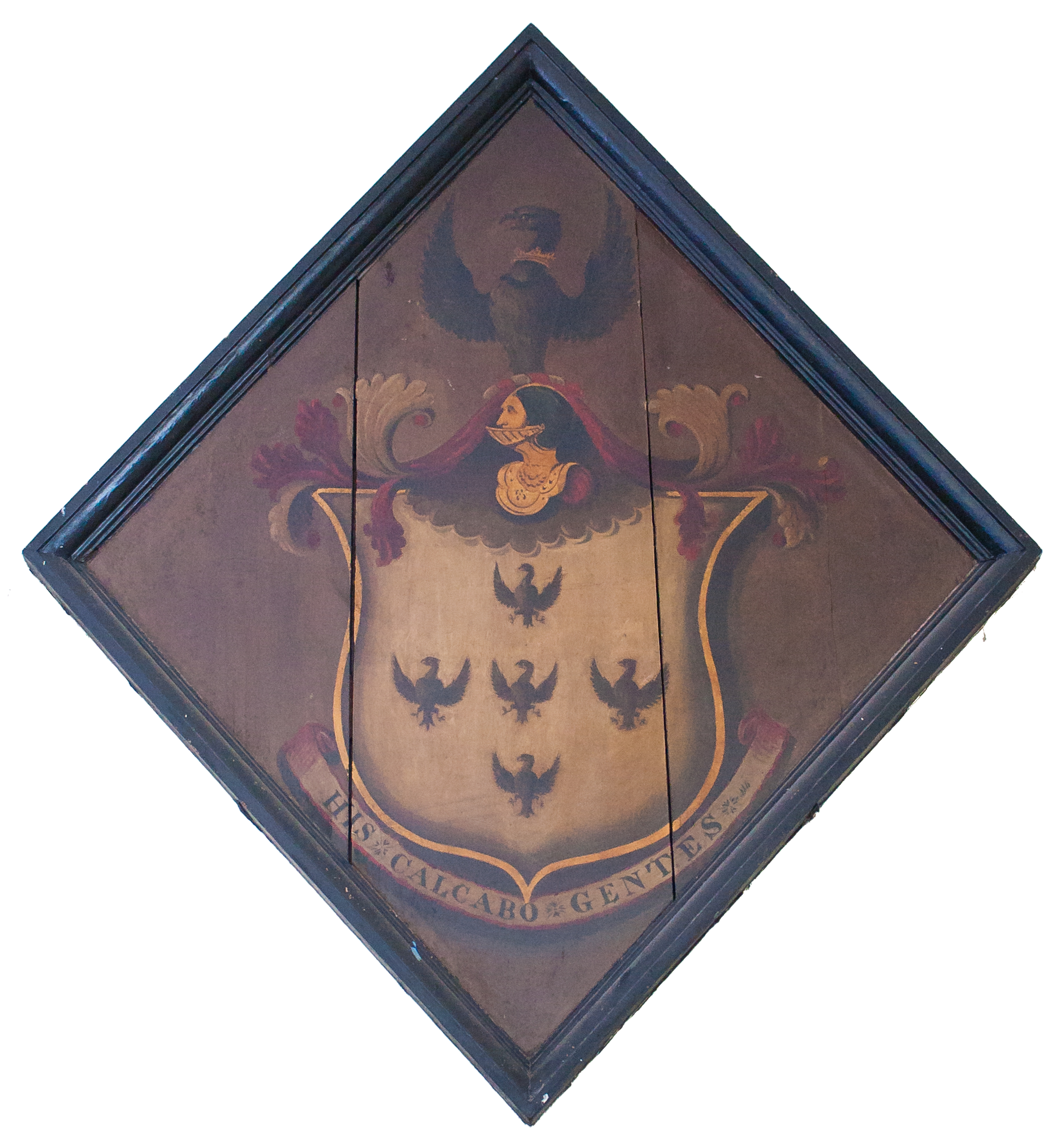
Arms of the Colclough family in St. Iberius' Church, Wexford. Arms: Argent, five eaglets displayed in cross sable. Crest: A demi eagle displayed sable ducally gorged or. Motto: His calcabo gentes.

The Colclough baronetcy (/ˈkoʊkliː/, COKE-lee), of Tintern Abbey, County Wexford, was created in the baronetage of Ireland on 21 July 1628 for Adam Colclough, High Sheriff of Wexford in 1630.

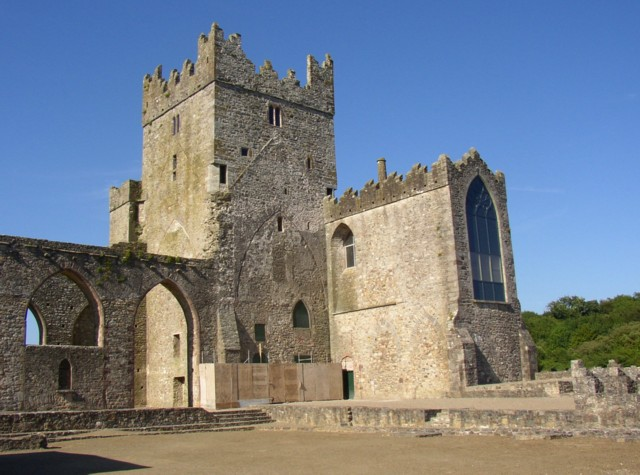
Ruins of Tintern Abbey

The family seat was Tintern Abbey (County Wexford) and its lands, which were granted in 1575 to Anthony Colclough from Staffordshire, an officer in Henry VIII's army, after the dissolution of the monasteries. After the death of the third baronet, the estate passed to the Leigh-Colclough (formerly Leigh) family.

== Colclough baronets of Tintern Abbey (1628) ==
- Sir Adam Colclough, 1st Baronet (c. 1590–1637)
- Sir Caesar Colclough, 2nd Baronet (1624–1684)
- Sir Caesar Colclough, 3rd Baronet (c. 1650–1687). Baronetcy extinct on his death.
