= Sir Caesar Colclough, 2nd Baronet =

Sir Caesar Colclough
- Born: 1624; County Wexford, Ireland
- Died: 1684 (aged 59–60); Ireland
- Occupations: Politician, landowner
- Title: 2nd Baronet of Tintern Abbey
- Spouse: Frances Clarke
- Children: 2
- Parent(s): Adam Colclough and Alice Rich

Sir Caesar Colclough, 2nd baronet (/ˈkoʊkliː/, COKE-lee); 1623–1684), of Greenham, Thatcham, Berkshire and Tintern Abbey, County Wexford, was an English Member of Parliament (MP).

He was a Member of the House of Commons of England for Newcastle-under-Lyme in 1661.

Baronetage of Ireland
Preceded by Adam Colclough	Baronet (of Tintern Abbey); 1637–1684	Succeeded by Caesar Colclough
