= Thomas Villiers, 1st Earl of Clarendon =

British politician and diplomat (1709–1786)

The Right Honourable The Earl of Clarendon PC
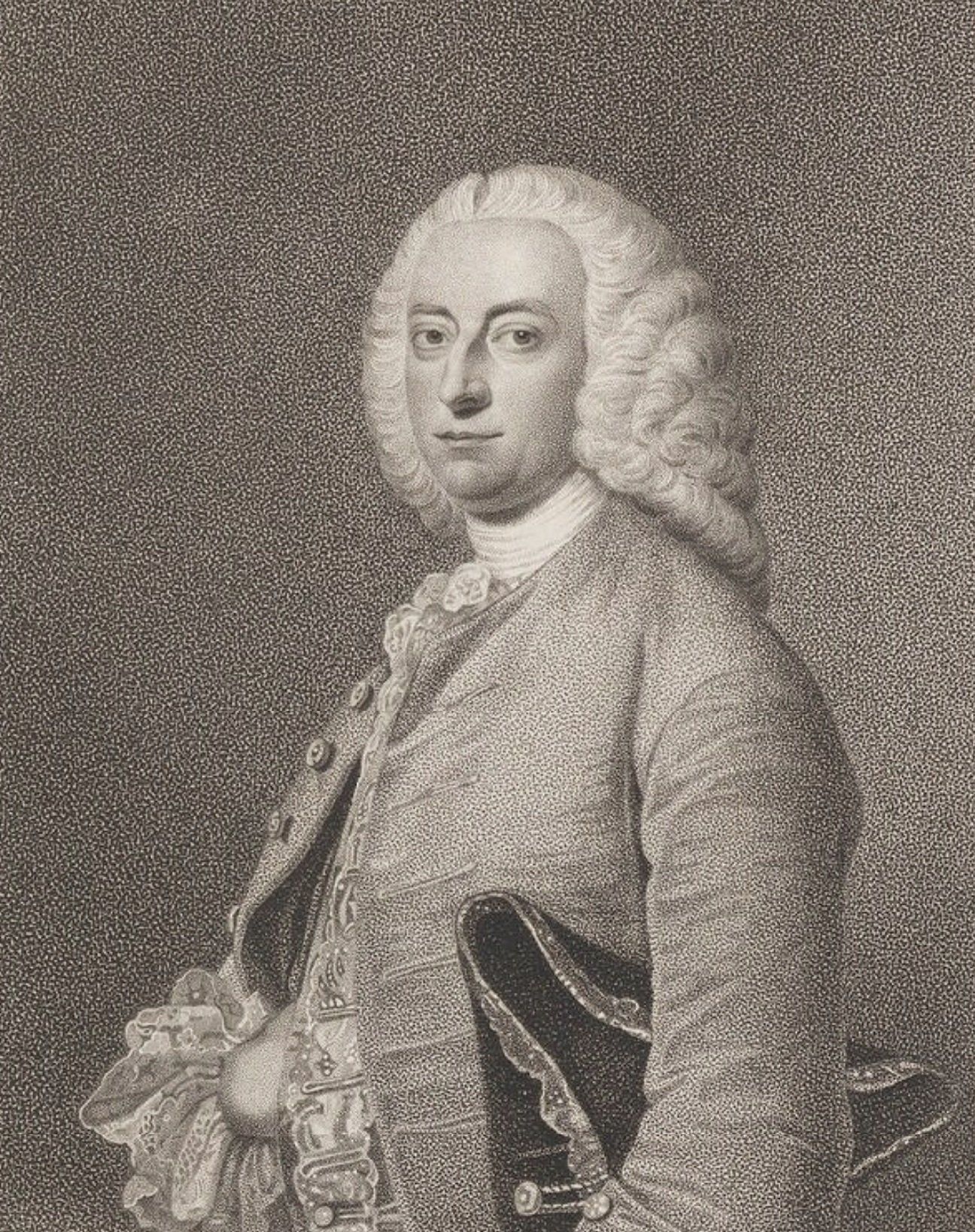
- Engraving by Charles Bestland after a Thomas Hudson portrait, 1803

Envoy Extraordinary to the Court of Augustus III
- In office 1738–1742
- Monarch: George II

Envoy Extraordinary to the Court of Maria Theresa
- In office 1742–1743
- Monarch: George II

Envoy Extraordinary to the Court of Frederick II of Prussia
- In office 1746–1748
- Monarch: George II

Member of Parliament for Tamworth
- In office 1747–1756
- Prime Minister: Henry Pelham; The Duke of Newcastle
- Preceded by: Lord John Sackville
- Succeeded by: William de Grey

Postmaster General
- In office 1763–1765
- Prime Minister: George Grenville
- Preceded by: The Earl of Egmont
- Succeeded by: The Earl of Bessborough
- In office 1786 – his death
- Prime Minister: William Pitt the Younger
- Preceded by: The Earl of Tankerville
- Succeeded by: The Lord Walsingham

Chancellor of the Duchy of Lancaster
- In office 1771–1782
- Prime Minister: The Lord North
- Preceded by: The Lord Strange
- Succeeded by: The Lord Ashburton
- In office 1783–1786
- Prime Minister: William Pitt the Younger
- Preceded by: The Earl of Derby
- Succeeded by: The Lord Hawkesbury

Personal details
- Born: 1709
- Died: 11 December 1786 (aged 76/77) Watford, England
- Party: Whig
- Spouse: Lady Charlotte Capell
- Children: Thomas Villiers, 2nd Earl of Clarendon; John Villiers, 3rd Earl of Clarendon; George Villiers; Lady Charlotte Barbara Villiers
- Parents: William Villiers, 2nd Earl of Jersey (father); Judith Herne (mother)
- Education: Queens' College, Cambridge
- Occupation: Politician and diplomat

Thomas Villiers, 1st Earl of Clarendon, PC (1709 – 11 December 1786) was a British politician and diplomat from the Villiers family. Clarendon was the second son of William Villiers, 2nd Earl of Jersey, and his wife Judith Herne, daughter of Frederick Herne.

== Political career ==
Villiers received his education at Eton College and then Queens' College, Cambridge. Following his graduation, he became a diplomat.

Villiers became the British envoy to both the Polish–Lithuanian Commonwealth and the Electorate of Saxony from 1740 to 1747. At the time both realms were in personal union under Augustus III of Poland. He was also sent to Vienna, capital of the Archduchy of Austria, as an envoy to the court of Maria Theresa of Austria from 1742 to 1743. He was last sent to Berlin, capital of the Kingdom of Prussia, as an envoy to the court of Frederick II of Prussia from 1746 to 1748.

Villiers was also involved in domestic politics as a member of the British Whig Party, which at the time dominated the Parliament of Great Britain. He was elected to Parliament in the 1747 British general election. He sat as a Member of Parliament for Tamworth from 1747 to 1756. He retired from all diplomatic offices at this time.

He was a Lord Commissioner of the Admiralty, one of seven members of the Board of Admiralty exercising command over the Royal Navy from 26 February 1748 to 17 November 1756. He served under First Lords of the Admiralty John Montagu, 4th Earl of Sandwich, and George Anson, 1st Baron Anson throughout his term.

On 3 June 1756, the barony of Hyde held by his wife's ancestors the Earls of Clarendon was revived. Villiers was raised to the peerage as Baron Hyde of Hindon in the County of Wiltshire.

Hyde served as Postmaster General from 1763 to 1765. On 9 September 1763, he was admitted to the Privy Council. He also served as Chancellor of the Duchy of Lancaster from 1771 to 1782 and again from 1783 to 1786.

On 14 June 1776 the earldom of Clarendon, which had become extinct with the death of Henry Hyde, 4th Earl of Clarendon, in 1753, was revived and Hyde was made Earl of Clarendon. In 1782 he was also made a Baron of the Kingdom of Prussia, an honour which he received Royal licence to use in Kingdom of Great Britain.

Clarendon returned to the office of Postmaster-General in commission with Henry Carteret, 1st Baron Carteret, in September 1786. This was to be his final political assignment.

Lord Clarendon died in December 1786, aged 77. He was succeeded in the earldom by his eldest son Thomas.

== Family ==
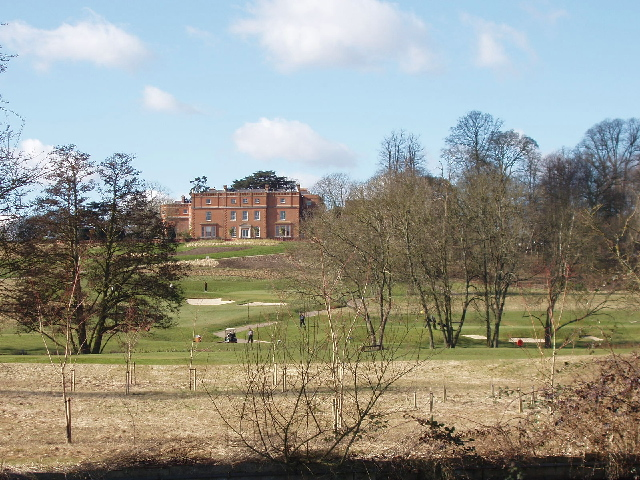
The Grove, Watford. Now an hotel

On 30 March 1752 he married Charlotte Capell, daughter of William Capell, 3rd Earl of Essex, and his wife Jane Hyde, daughter of Henry Hyde, 4th Earl of Clarendon (of the 1661 creation), and Jane Leveson-Gower. They had four children:

- Thomas Villiers, 2nd Earl of Clarendon (25 December 1753 – 7 March 1824).
- John Villiers, 3rd Earl of Clarendon (14 November 1757 – 22 December 1838).
- George Villiers (23 November 1759 – 21 March 1827). Father of George Villiers, 4th Earl of Clarendon.
- Lady Charlotte Barbara Villiers (27 March 1761 – 9 April 1810).

Robert Grimston, 1st Baron Grimston of Westbury's daughter, the Hon. Rosemary Sybella Violet Grimston, married the actor Charles Edward Underdown, on the 10 February 1953. Charles Edward Underdown and Rosemary Grimston were sixth cousins, through their common ancestors Thomas Villiers, 1st. Earl of Clarendon, and Lady Charlotte Capell, according to Burke's Peerage, (Volume 2, page 1685, 107th. edition, 2003).

He bought and remodelled The Grove, a country house near Watford, Hertfordshire.

Political offices
Preceded by The Earl of Egmont; The Lord Trevor	Postmaster General; 1763 – 1765; With: The Lord Trevor	Succeeded by The Earl of Bessborough; The Lord Trevor
Preceded by The Lord Strange	Chancellor of the Duchy of Lancaster; 1771 – 1782	Succeeded by The Lord Ashburton
Preceded by The Earl of Derby	Chancellor of the Duchy of Lancaster; 1783–1786	Succeeded by The Lord Hawkesbury
Preceded by The Earl of Tankerville; The Lord Carteret	Postmaster General; 1786; With: The Lord Carteret	Succeeded by The Lord Walsingham; The Lord Carteret
Peerage of Great Britain
New creation	Earl of Clarendon; 2nd creation 1776–1786	Succeeded by Thomas Villiers
New creation	Baron Hyde; 2nd creation 1756–1786	Succeeded by Thomas Villiers
