= Sir William Leveson-Gower, 4th Baronet =

English politician

Sir William Leveson Gower
- Pronunciation: /wɪljəm ˈljuːsən ˈɡɔːr/ Wilyam LEW-sən GOR
- Born: William Gower; 1647—1648; Stittenham, near Sheriff Hutton, North Yorkshire
- Died: 22 December 1691
- Occupations: Landowner and politician
- Years active: 1675—1691
- Known for: Supporter of Exclusion Bills
- Title: 4th Baronet of Stittenham (1689)
- Political party: Court party or Tory initially. Whig, with some reservations, from 1679.
- Spouse: Jane Granville
- Children: Katherine (1670–1704); John Leveson-Gower, 1st Baron Gower (1675–1709).; Jane Hyde, Countess of Clarendon (d. 1725)
- Parents: Sir Thomas Gower, 2nd Baronet of Stittenham (father); Frances Leveson (mother)

Sir William Leveson-Gower, 4th Baronet (c. 1647 – 22 December 1691) was an English landowner and politician from Yorkshire. He added the surname Leveson to his own in 1668, when he inherited the Trentham and Lilleshall estates of his maternal great-uncle, Sir Richard Leveson, making him a major landowner and the progenitor of the Leveson-Gower family. He was a member of several parliaments. Although he began as an enthusiastic supporter of the Court of Charles II, he became noted for his unremitting support for the Exclusion Bills.

== Origins and education ==
William Gower was the second son of Sir Thomas Gower, 2nd Baronet and Frances, daughter and coheir of John Leveson. He was educated from the age of 9 at Pocklington School.

The Gowers were middling gentry, active in local affairs, but without connections to the Court. Howevever their estates, though not large, were productive and closely-managed, mainly made up of Yorkshire grazing land. Their hoizons were not merely local, however as Sir Thomas was the Member of Parliament for Malton from 1661 until his death, staying in London whenever required.

== Inheritance and wealth ==
Relief map of England and Wales, showing location of Leveson Gower's major estates.

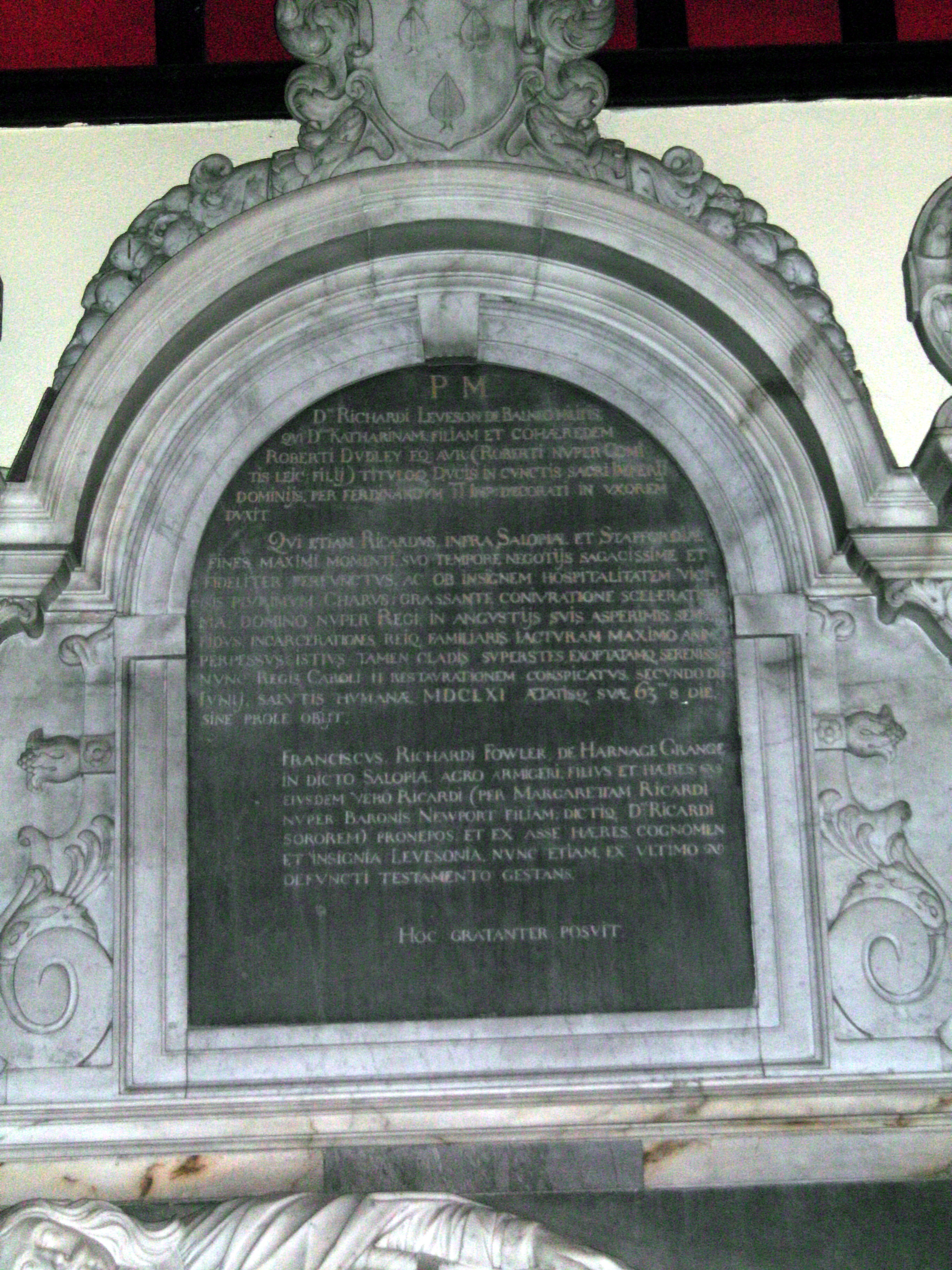
Memorial tablet to Richard Leveson (1598–1661) in St Michael's Church, Lilleshall. It was erected by Richard Fowler, his immediate heir, whose line petered out after a few years, leaving the estates to William Gower.

Through his mother, William Gower became heir to the very large Staffordshire and Shropshire estates of the Leveson family. When his uncle, Sir Richard Leveson, died without issue in 1661, his estates had passed initially to Richard Fowler, a great nephew and a minor member of the Shropshire gentry. This line of succession did not last long, as Richard died in 1667 and his last surviving son the following year. Sir Richard Leveson's will provided for a further line of succession, which brought the estates through his sister, Frances Leveson, to William Gower, her son. William added the surname Leveson to his own when he inherited the Leveson estates, which included Trentham and Lilleshall and Sheriffhales. Generally his surname is given as Leveson Gower in documents from this time onwards. The family later adopted hyphenation, which was not the custom in the 17th century.

It was the inheritance of these large landed estates that allowed William Leveson Gower to make a "socially desirable" marriage to Lady Jane Granville, the eldest daughter of the John Granville, 1st Earl of Bath. A hostile observer commented of Leveson Gower that he "had a great estate fall to him by chance; but honesty and wit never came by accident." Although the remark is attributed to Andrew Marvell, the satire in which it is found, List of Pensioners in this Parliament, is not included in editions of Marvell's collected works.

Leveson Gower pursued a policy of rapid short-term enrichment in his newly gained estates, which were almost entirely under leasehold tenancy, usually for long periods of time, from 21 years up to three lifetimes. As leases came to an end, he pushed up the admission fines, payable on renewal, as well as making dramatic rent increases. This policy was restricted for a time by the jointure arrangements of Lady Catherine Leveson, née Dudley, Sir Richard's widow, who still held substantial lands at Trentham and smaller areas further south and resisted his methods until her death in 1674. Increasing the admission fines alone made him about £40,000 over his ownership of the estates, close to his total income from the annual rents.

The policy clashed with the advice of George Plaxton, a clergyman and sometime estate manager in his employ, whom he presented to the benefice of St Mary's Church, Sheriffhales. Plaxton later reversed William's policy, while working for his son and grandson, as it front-loaded gains at the cost of eroding long-term control. Leveson Gower did manage to expand the Midlands estates slightly by buying land around Sheriffhales in 1688, towards the end of his life. However he was inattentive to the actual condition of the estates and large arrears had built up in the Midlands by the time of his death in 1691, amounting to about half his potential income. He had shown little interest in the quality of either the tenants or the buildings and fixtures of his major estates. On an income of about £2000 a year, Leveson Gower was at the very peak of the landed gentry, and richer than some of the nobility. However more than a third of his income came from the small but better-managed Stittenham estates, which he had inherited only in 1689, where arrears stood at just over £8.

== Political ambition ==
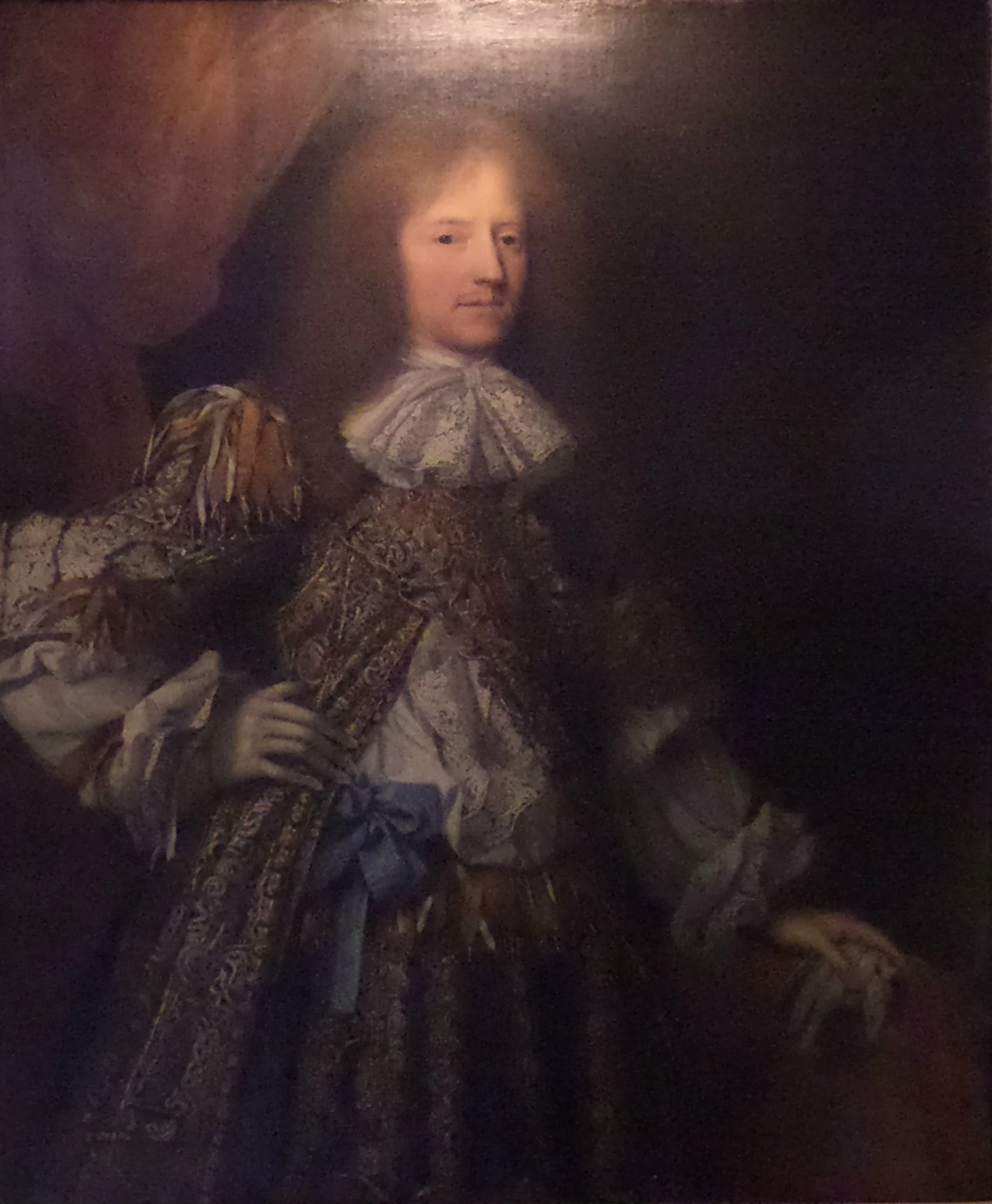
John Granville, 1st Earl of Bath, Leveson Gower's father-in-law.

Marriage to Lady Jane Granville opened up a much wider political horizons for Leveson Gower and for his father, Thomas. They had a key to circles within the court and government through Lady Jane's father, the Earl of Bath, who held a formidable range of posts, including Groom of the Stole, keeper of St James's Palace, steward of the Duchy of Cornwall and member of the Privy Council of England. He was on close terms both with Charles II of England and his brother James, Duke of York. As documented in the Sutherland Papers, Thomas Gower wrote to him on family business probably fairly frequently. In 1671, the year before he died, Gower was in London, travelling by sea from Kingston upon Hull, to represent Malton in the House of Commons of England. He observed political life in and from the capital, sending back detailed reports to his son, William. His last important contribution to Parliament was to manage a conference on the assault of an MP, Sir John Coventry. He had been ill throughout this period.

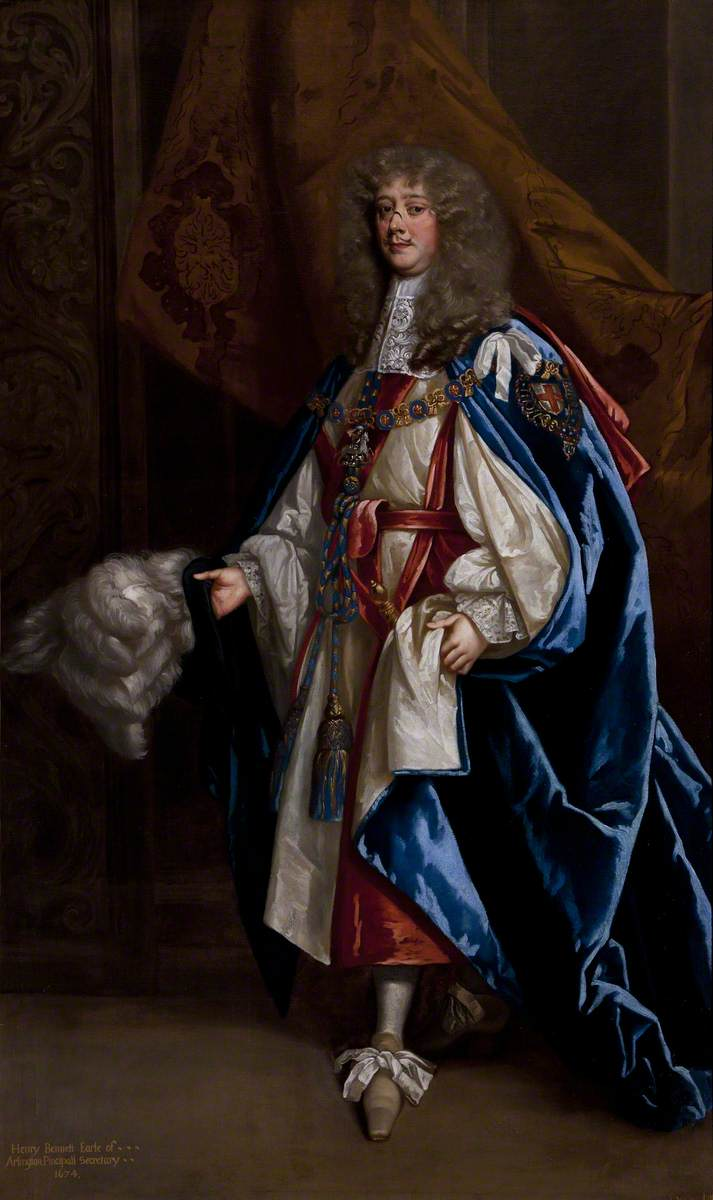
Henry Bennet, 1st Earl of Arlington, who sought to place Leveson Gower in the Malton constituency. Portrait by Peter Lely and studio.

Sir Thomas Gower's death on 3 September 1672 left an opening for Leveson Gower at Malton. However, the Gower's were not dominant in the borough: the representation had traditionally been decided by the Hebblethwaites and the Eure family, then represented by Margaret Danby, née Eure. Gower himself had only managed to take the seat in 1661 by appealing against the return the return of Margaret's husband, Thomas Danby. Leveson Gower's prospects were greatly enhanced by his court contacts, as Henry Bennet, 1st Earl of Arlington, a member of the Cabal ministry, wrote to Madam Danby, asking her "to favour Mr. Leveson Gower with her credit in the election." Evidently, the matter had come to royal attention, as in her reply she informed Arlington that:

Her tenants at Malton are ready to comply with her desire for the election of her cousin Leveson to the burgesship of Malton. If His Majesty’s commands together with her own inclination to serve her cousin had not prompted her to assist him, his (Arlington’s) desires would have been sufficient.

However, the election on 21 Feb. 1673 was botched, with both Leveson Gower and his rival, James Hebblethwaite, returned. The impasse took five years to resolve.

Another opportunity to secure election to Parliament arrived in 1675, when one of the two MPs for Newcastle-under-Lyme, Edward Mainwaring, died, leaving Sir Caesar Colclough as its sole representative. Newcastle was conveniently close to the family's Trentham estate and the Levesons had long had great influence, but their dominance was contested not only by the Mainwarings of Whitmore Hall, but also the Bowyers of Knypersley Hall. The election was hotly contested between Leveson Gower and Sir John Bowyer, whose family had supported Parliament in the English Civil War. It was alleged that Bowyer had personally provoked Leveson Gower and also that Colclough's steward had ordered his tenants to vote for Bowyer, without Colclough's assent. Leveson Gower's influence at Court was counted against him by some electors, with one declaring that he "was greatwith the King and too often at Court, and that he liked him the worse for that." Leveson Gower was elected without incident and only later did Bowyer decide to contest his return. The matter was not resolved in Leveson Gower's favour until 1677. Meanwhile he took up his seat in the Commons.

== Summary of Parliamentary career ==
Parliament	Dates of Parliament	Constituency	Leveson Gower elected	Other member	Notes
Cavalier Parliament	1661—1679	Newcastle-under-Lyme	21 Apr. 1675	Sir Caesar Colclough	Moderately active. Leveson Gower was a compliant supporter of the Court.
Habeas Corpus Parliament, also called First Exclusion Parliament	6 March 1679—12 July 1679	Newcastle-under-Lyme	6 February 1679	Sir Thomas Bellot, Bt	Generally a Tory, he voted with the government until the final stages of the Parliament, when he joined the Whig opposition in voting to exclude James, Duke of York from the succession.
Second Exclusion Parliament	21 October 1680—18 January 1681	Newcastle-under-Lyme	1679	Sir Thomas Bellot, Bt	Leveson Gower continued to vote with the Whigs and became one of the most committed to Exclusion, noted as an extreme opponent by James II himself.
Oxford Parliament, also called Third Exclusion Parliament	21 March 1681— 28 March 1681	Shropshire	3 March 1681	Hon. Richard Newport	Very active, Leveson Gower made an enemy of Leoline Jenkins, the effective government leader, and helped prepare the third Exclusion Bill.
Loyal Parliament	19 May 1685—2 July 1687	Not elected. Defeated at Newcastle.		Edward Mainwaring, William Sneyd	The replacement of the Newcastle-under-Lyme corporation by a royal-nominated panel made it impossible for Leveson Gower to secure election in James II's Parliament.
Convention Parliament	22 January 1689—6 February 1690	Newcastle-under-Lyme	11 January 1689	John Lawton	An active MP, Leveson Gower welcomed the Glorious Revolution, but strongly supported the Church of England.
2nd Parliament of William III and Mary II	20 March 1690—11 October 1695	Newcastle-under-Lyme	4 March 1690	Sir Thomas Bellot, Bt	Leveson Gower occupied an ambiguous position in Parliament, sometimes considered a leading figure in a middle party.

== Member of Charles II's Parliaments ==
=== Cavalier Parliament ===
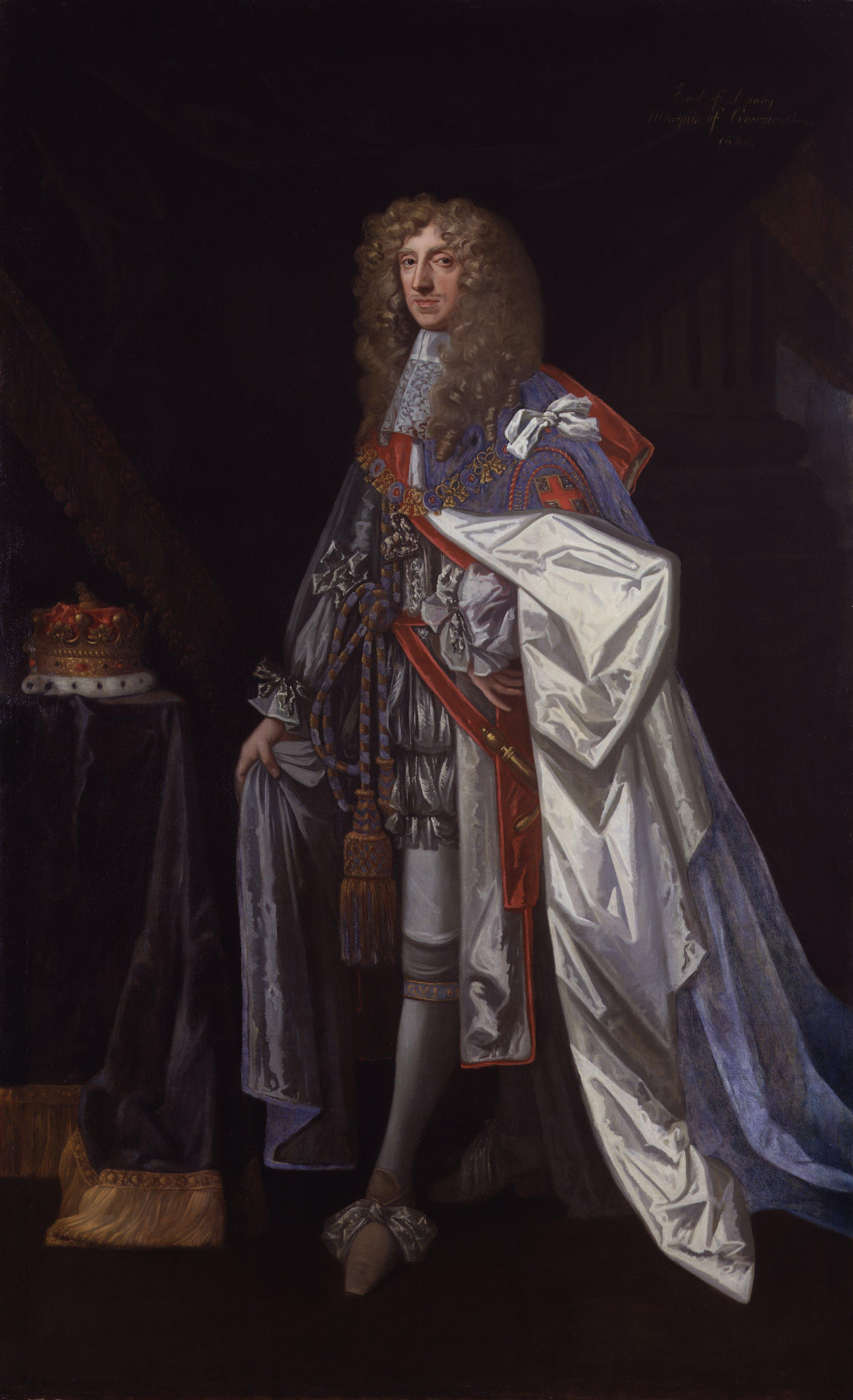
Thomas Osborne, Lord Danby. Portrait by Peter Lely (1618–1680).

The History of Parliament records that Leveson Gower was a "moderately active" member of the Cavalier Parliament. He spoke nine times in the House of Commons over a roughly four year period. He was generally seen as a supporter of the Court and an intervention of February 1677 left little doubt of it. Whem James Herbert proposed to grant the king £600,000 for shipbuilding, he was laughed at and Sir Francis Russell countered that a proper report on the state of the Navy was necessary before any sum could be considered. Leveson Gower, however, proposed handing over the whole sum without further ado:

Has the King invaded any man's property, or shed any man's blood in vain? You need not be jealous of property and religion. It goes hard with the King to retrench his house, and the pensions, and he has parted with his revenue to pay the bankers debt. Moves therefore that we may supply the King with 600,000l. for building Ships.

On 21 December, the day after the House decided to impeach the Earl of Danby, the king's leading minister, Leveson Gower tried to deflect attention from him towards five imprisoned Catholic peers, who had been swept up in the scare over the fictitious Popish Plot.

Catherine of Braganza, Charles II's Portuguese Catholic wife, who came under intense suspicion during the popish Plot hoax. Portrait attributed to Jacob Huysmans.

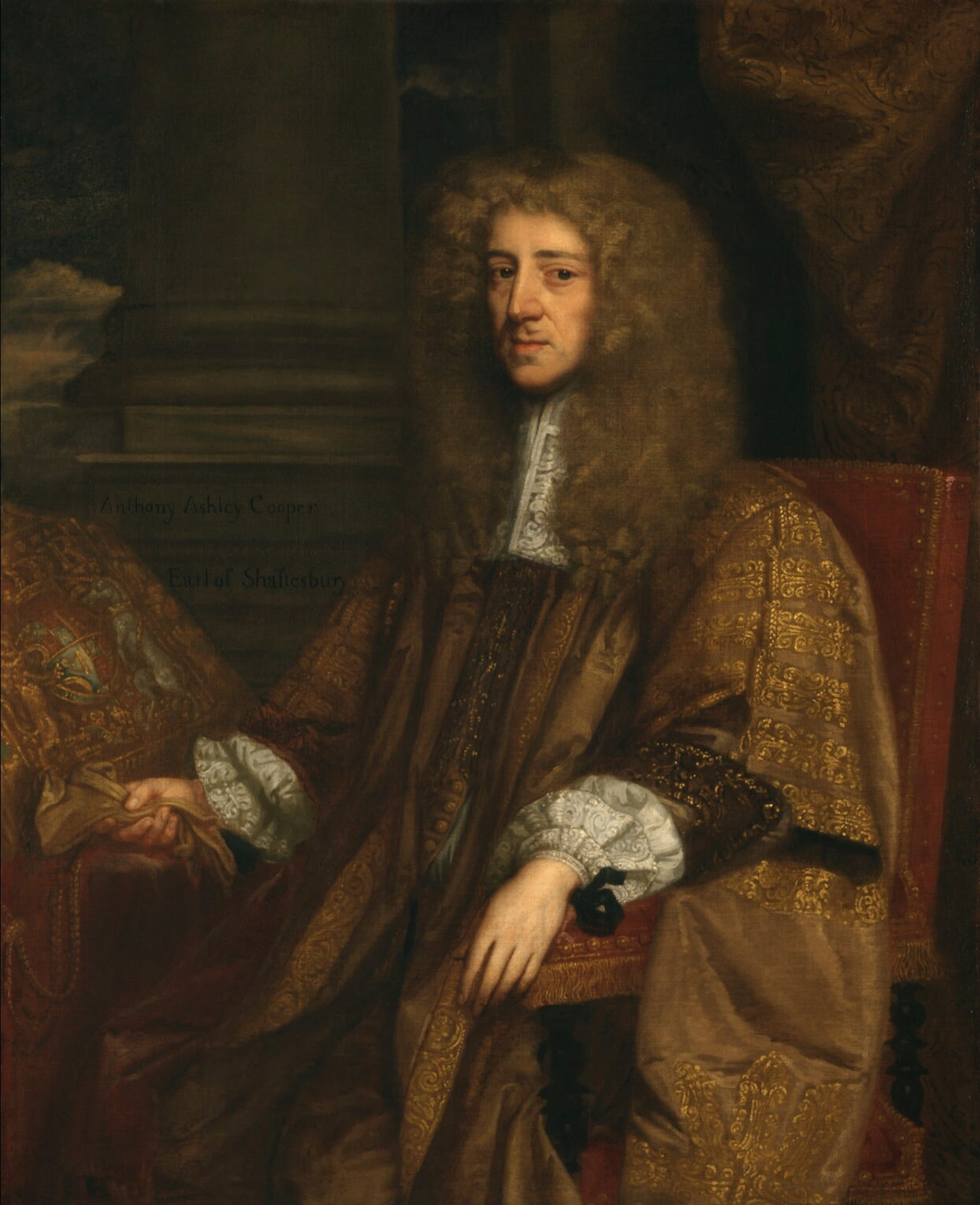
Portrait by John Greenhill of Anthony Ashley-Cooper, 1st Earl of Shaftesbury, leader of the Whig opposition.

=== Habeas Corpus or First Exclusion Parliament ===
The new parliament that assembled in March 1679 was more suspicious of the king and determined to exclude his Catholic brother James, Duke of York, from the succession. Josiah Wedgwood remarked that "No one could have been elected to this Parliament who was not a denouncer of Catholics." Leveson Gower began the session by speaking obstructively and roughly during the debate on the choice of Speaker, upsetting several younger members, who called aloud: "To the Bar." He continued to support Danby. However, his anti-Catholic views were beginning to clash with his attachment to the Court. His ill-tempered remarks about a suspected Catholic were noted: "being at the sessions, (Leveson Gower) did observe Sir Symen Deg to give the charge more favourably concerning Papists than others and did thereupon tell him that he spoke more like a Jesuit than a Justice." On 27 April, in a debate on "how to preserve the King's Person from the attempts and conspiracies of the Papists," Leveson Gower moved to repeal the exemption given to the Queen's servants from the Test Acts. By the end of the parliament Leveson Gower had joined the opposition. Wedgwood opined:

Naturally of a Royalist and Tory family, I think he must have become a Whig or at least a very anti-Catholic Church Tory, at the time of the Exclusion Bill...

=== Second Exclusion Parliament ===
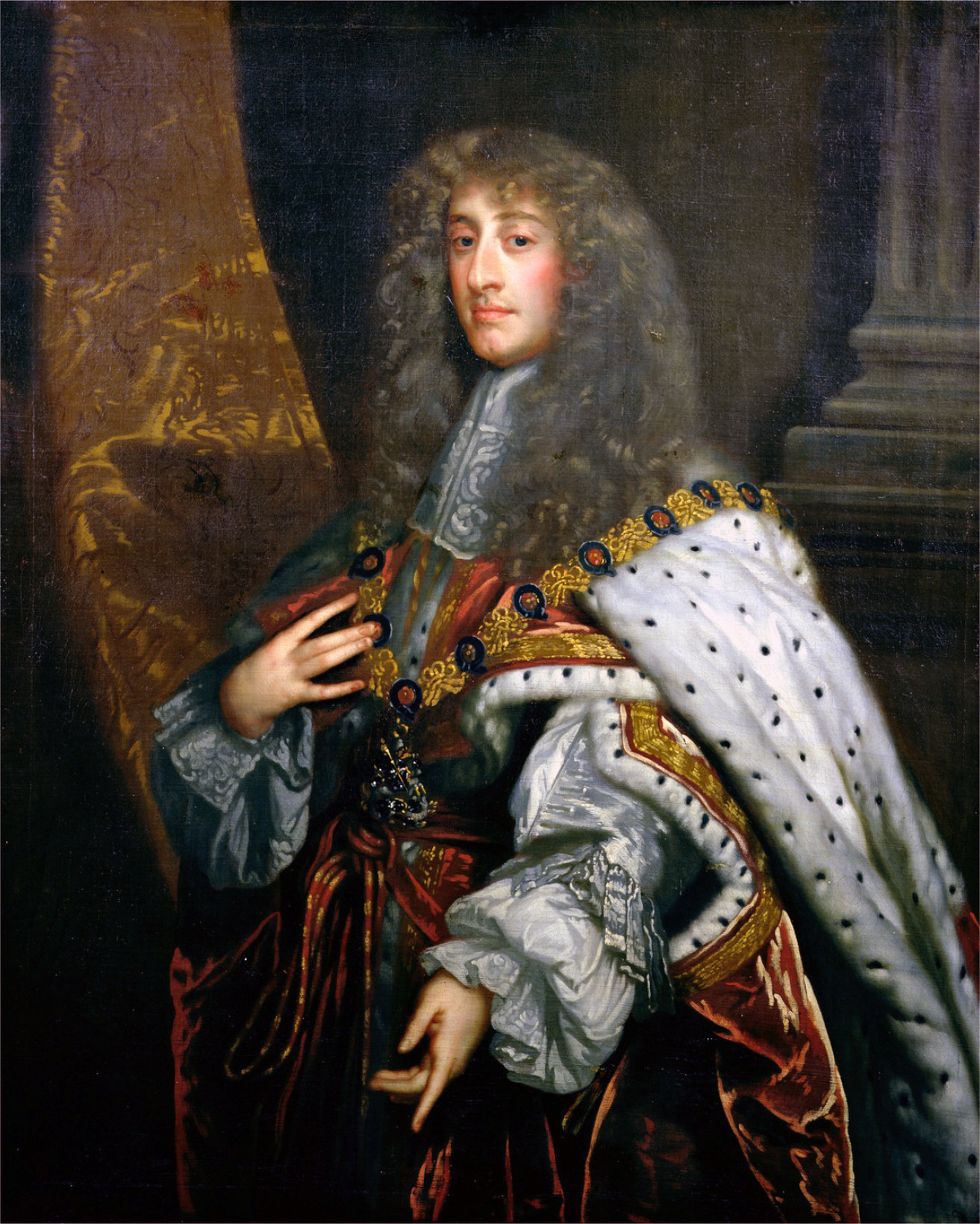
James, Duke of York, later King James VII of Scotland and II of England, in robes of the Order of the Garter.

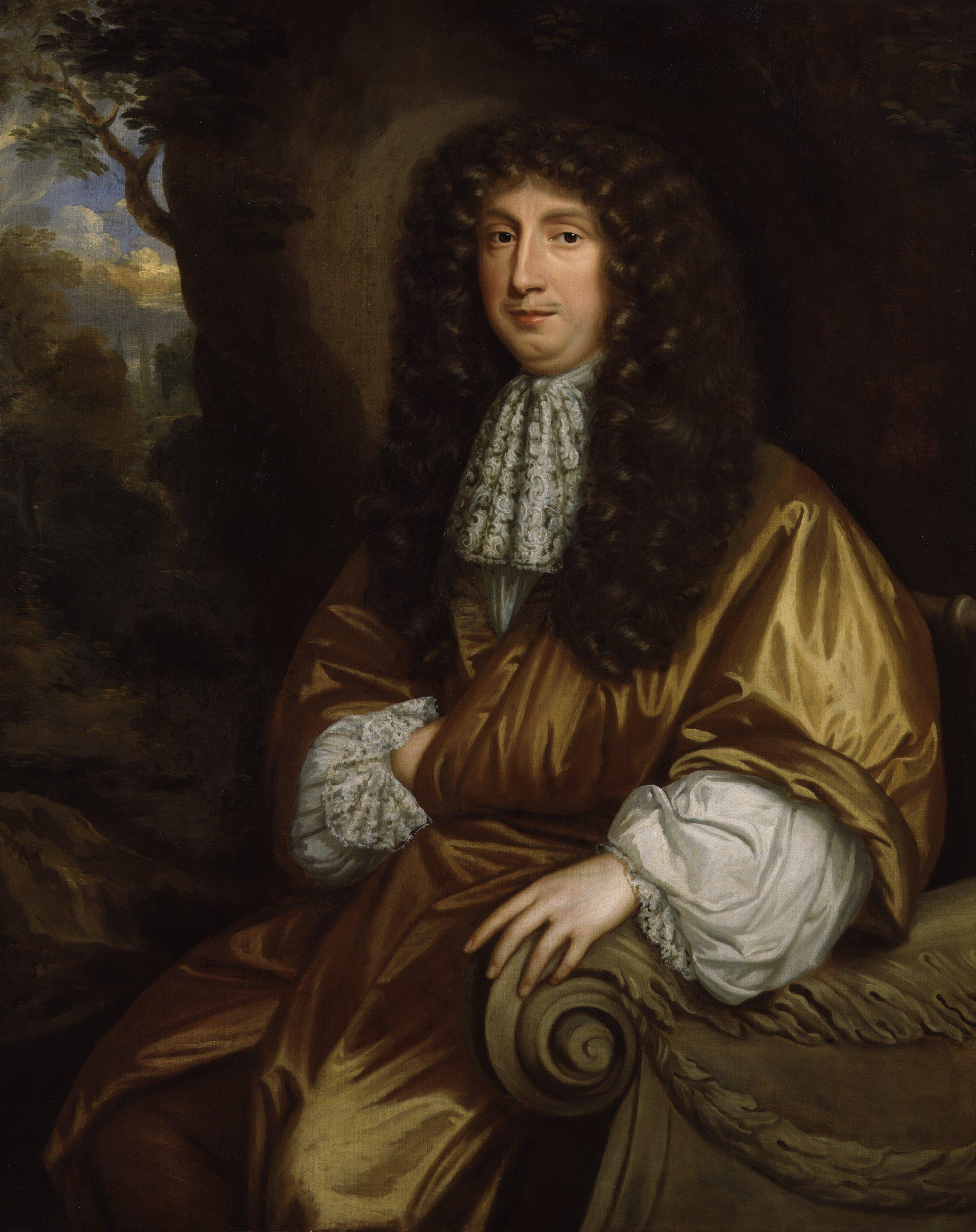
George Savile, Marquess of Halifax, by Mary Beale, c. 1674–1676. Leveson Gower clashed with Halifax several times in his career.

In the Second Exclusion Parliament Leveson Gower began to make interventions in favour of Protestant unity. On 27 November, as the Commons debated the king's refusal to dismiss George Savile, 1st Marquess of Halifax, who had foiled the Exclusion bill's passage through the House of Lords, his outburst created consternation: "The Promises made to the Nation at Breda are not kept. But change the old for a new pack, and you have the same Knave still." He was immediately challenged by Sir William Temple, who asserted: "I have heard a reflection from that Member upon the King." The Speaker, Sir William Williams, intervened to clarify that the attack was on the ministers, not the king. Leveson Gower assented: "The King's Promises at Breda were not effectual, because the Ministers have broken them." As the parliament ground to a halt with another Exclusion Bill lost in the House of Lords, Leveson Gower said:

If the Lords had been left to themselves they would have passed this bill as well as we. But there is a great reason why we have not this bill passed. Persons near the King are interested for the Duke, and so long as they are at Court we shall not have this bill. ... The Court has become the nursery of all manner of vices transplanted into all England, and those are become only fit for the Court that are so. I would have the House freely express themselves about persons about the King, who hinder those things.

In order to exclude the Duke of York from the succession, Leveson Gower believed, "Nothing less than a firm union among all Protestants in this nation can be sufficient. James himself considered Leveson Gower a source of "unmannerly threats'" and remembered that around this time he had said:

Some men perhaps will endeavour to make their peace with the Duke, but I will perish first; wherefore my opinion is we should breake up, and each man return to his Country and let the People see how we are used, and I doubt not but they will soon join with us, their swords in their hands, and hen we'l let the Duke know we defy him, and all his Popish adherents.

=== Oxford or Third Exclusion Parliament ===
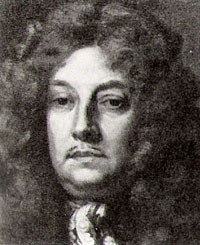
Francis Newport, 1st Earl of Bradford (1620-1708), the Whig politician who ensured Leveson Gower's return for Shropshire in the Oxford Parliament.

In the general election of March 1681 Leveson Gower was returned for the county constituency of Shropshire. One of the sitting MPs, Sir Vincent Corbet, had died shortly befoe the election, leaving a vacancy. Two possible Court supporters, Sir John Corbet of Stoke on Tern and Robert Leighton of Wattlesborough, investigated the possibility of standing. However, Leveson Gower had no need to contest an election, as the county's representatives were always selected at a gentry meeting conducted by Lord Newport. He was also returned for Newcastle but chose to sit for Shropshire when the parliament convened at Oxford.

Leveson Gower's level of political activity reached a peak in this parliament, as he made four speeches in the week it lasted. On 24 March, speaking immediately after Leoline Jenkins, Secretary of State, who had responded negatively to the proposal of a new Exclusion Bill, Leveson Gower spoke as if to the King: "...and those People that are Bryars and Thorns scratch you in your intentions against Popery; which, I see, we cannot prevent without this Bill, and therefore I am for it." The same day he ran up against Jenkins again, in a debate on the proposal to publish Parliament's votes:

I find that those who write our Votes and Transactions, and send them all England over, are favoured, and I believe that no Gentleman in the House will be against printing them, but Jenkins. I hope you will not be ashamed of what you do; therefore I am for printing your Votes.

On 26 March, as the House began to debate whether there were realistic alternatives to an Exclusion bill, Leveson Gower challenged its opponents to announce some: "If any Gentlemen have Expedients to preserve the Protestant Religion, without this Bill of Exclusion, they would do well to propose them, and they will deserve well of the House; and if they seem to them to give security, &c. I should be glad to hear them." Later he advocated that the House present the King with a statement of reasons for excluding the Duke from the succession. Called to order by Edward Vaughan, he simply repeated the same point and then denounced the King's ministers:

The shameful Retrenchments in the King's Family arise from the Duke's Creatures; and it is not safe for the King to part with any one of his Ministers, unless he parts with them all. These that retrench the King's Family, do it to get together a Bank of Money for a Popish Successor, and then will be their time to take away the King.

Leveson Gower, under the preudonym "Mr George," was one of those deputed to a committee to prepare a new Exclusion bill.

== Friend of dissenters ==
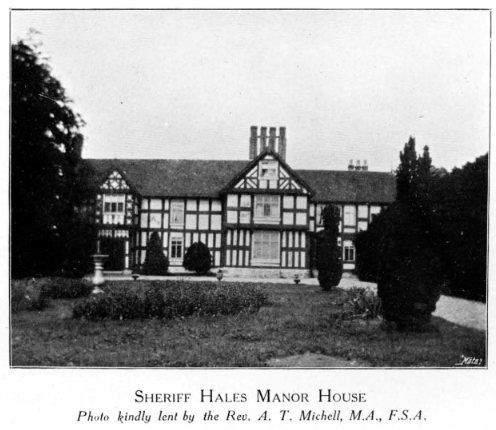
The manor house at Sheriffhales, photographed about 1900. A dissenting academy under John Woodhouse in the late 17th Century. The photo was provided by Arthur Michell to the Congregational Historical Society and shows the house before its major restoration of 1952.

Leveson Gower had begun putting into practice his views about Protestant unity by allowing John Woodhouse, a Presbyterian minister, to open a dissenting academy, in the Sheriffhales manor house, around 1675. It is a four-bayed structure, just west of St Mary's Church, Sheriffhales. It had been built in the late 16th and 17th centuries and was generally rented out, rather than used as a residence by the lord of the manor. It was leased to Woodhouse at much lower than the market rate and with the express disapproval of George Plaxton, Leveson Gower's former schoolmate, friend, and Vicar of Sheriffhales.

The venture was intended to circumvent the ban on university education for nonconformists. According to the 1814 account of Joshua Toulmin, possibly based on Woodhouse's own papers, there were lectures in logic, anatomy and mathematics, followed by physics, ethics and rhetoric, as well as Greek and Hebrew. There were more professionally-oriented lectures for those going on to become lawyers or ministers. Leveson Gower seems to have stood behind the academy, despite its many difficulties, poor land management and probably unpaid rent, to the end of his life. It certainly outlived him: the next lease on the manor house did not commence until February 1697.

Early in 1682 Leveson Gower was named as one of the supporters of dissenters in Staffordshire.

== Tory reaction ==
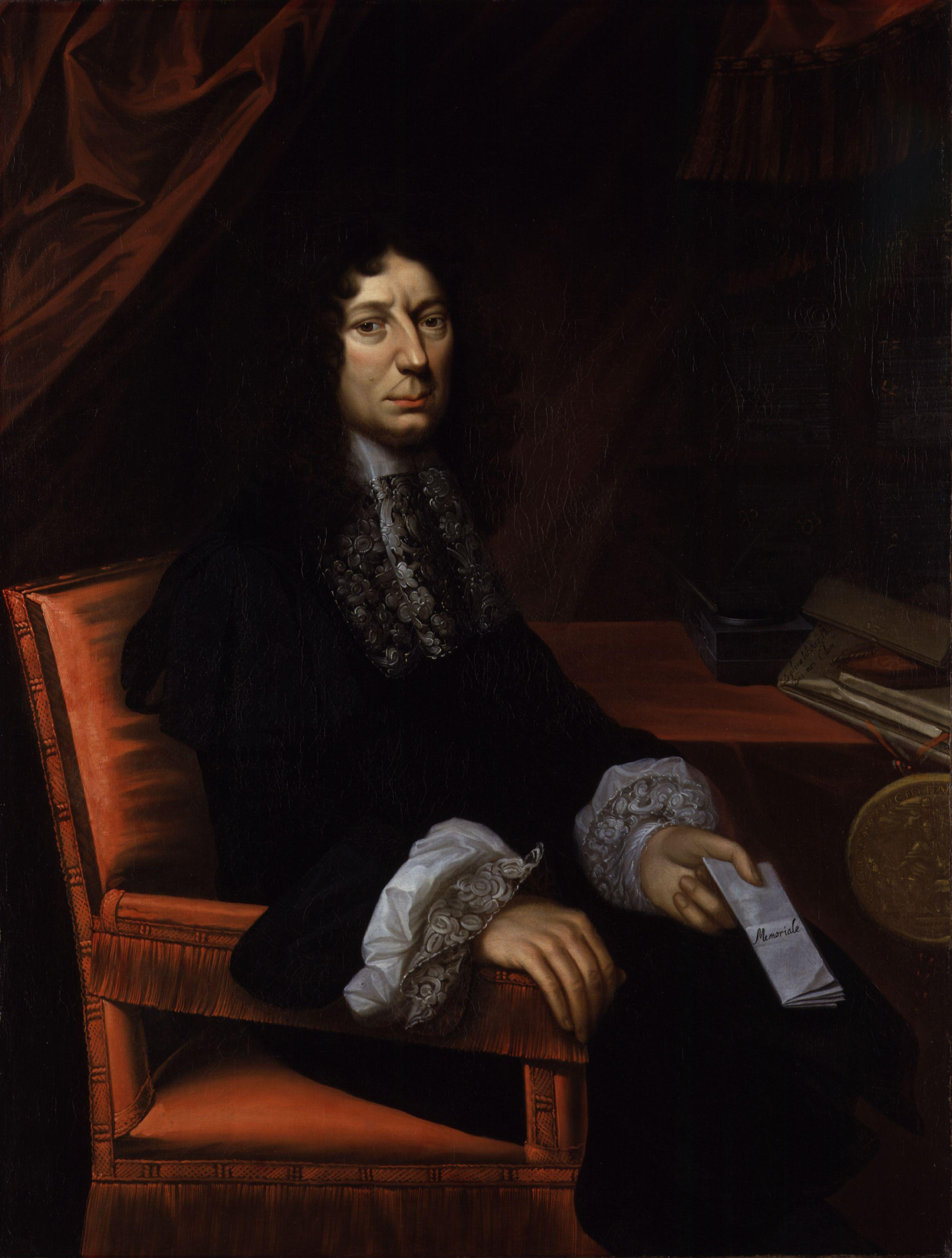
Sir Leoline Jenkins, by Herbert Tuer (died 1691), given to the National Portrait Gallery, London in 1860. Jenkins clashed with Leveson Gower in the House of Commons and later put him under surveillance.

James Scott, Duke of Monmouth and Buccleuch, circa 1683. Possibly after Willem Wissing. NPG 151. © National Portrait Gallery, London.

Leoline Jenkins, Secretary of State, whom Leveson Gower had crossed in Parliament, put him under surveillance. On 29 March 1682 he wrote to the Bishop of Lichfield's secretary offering up to £10 to recruit informers for the task. The office of Owen Wynne, Jenkins' confidential secretary, was to handle communications with the spies. Soon there were allegations that Leveson Gower was stockpiling weapons and that he was a Freemason.

Whatever the accusations of secret conspiracy, Leveson Gower openly and with considerable éclat defied the Tory administration. He received and entertained the Duke of Monmouth, the Whig candidate for the succession, at Trentham on his northward progress to Chester, to attend the horse races, in early September 1682. He received Monmouth again on his return south on 19 September, accompanying him to Stafford, where he received a rapturous reception before being arrested on the King's orders. Leveson Gower was among those who offered to stand bail for him.

The rights and privileges of boroughs had been under royal assault since the Stuart Restoration and this had played a major part in Charles II's rapid loss of popularity in the late 1660's. At Newcastle a new charter had been issued in 1664, which the borough council had no option but to accept. Crucially it had made the election of a Recorder or Town Clerk invalid unless approved by the King in writing. However, for twenty years there was no royal attempt to interfere in the government of Newcastle. This changed suddenly in 1684, when a royal nominee was substituted for the council's own choice of Steward or Recorder, apparently because of a tip off sent by Sir Hugh Cholmeley to Secretary Jenkins. Shortly afterwards the council was effectively suspended, as it was forced to surrender its charter. Before doing so it took evasive action by handing over all its assets for a term of one thousand years to a committee of trustees, which included Leveson Gower himself and Sir Thomas Bellot, another former MP. This was expressly forbidden to spend money on anything but poor relief and maintenance of a minister of religion. Charles II died on 6 February 1685, while negotiations on charter renewal were incomplete.

Shortly afterwards James VII and II imposed a charter setting up an entirely nominated body under the high stewardship of Charles Talbot, 1st Duke of Shrewsbury. This coup from above allowed the ministry to control the next parliamentary election on 30 April 1685. The result was that both Leveson Gower and Bellot were defeated, while Edward Mainwaring and William Sneyd were returned as MPs.

== Parliaments of William III and Mary II ==
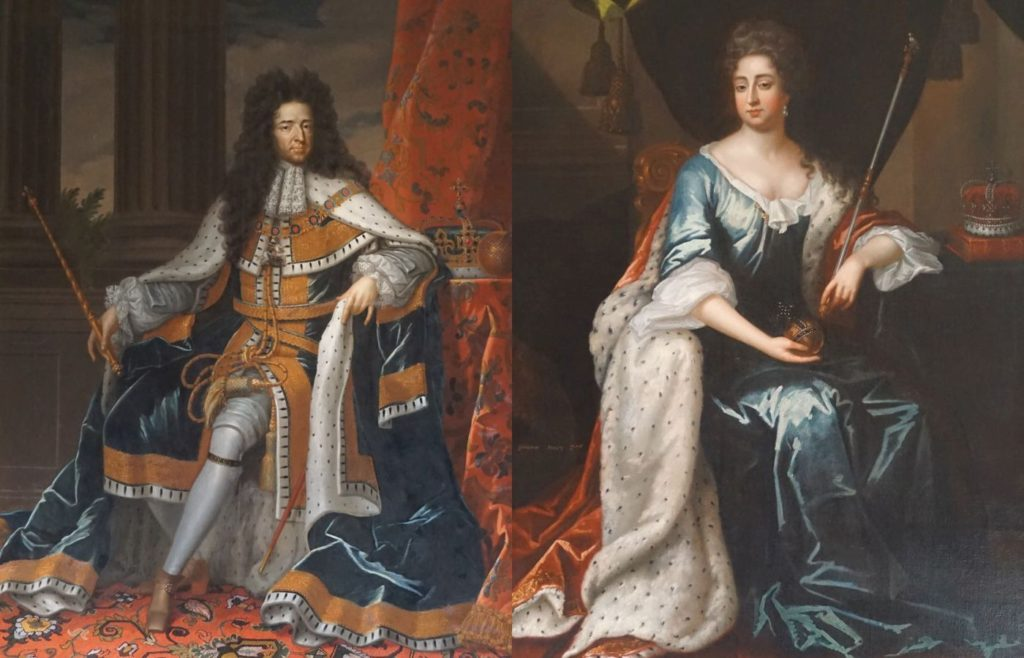
William and Mary in coronation robes

There has been a shift in emphasis about Leveson Gower's political affiliation after the "Glorious Revolution." Wedgwood in 1920 was in no doubt that "in the 1689 election he was distinctly a Tory, in which party he continued till death, 1691." The History of Parliament's 1983 volume, covering 1660—1690 saw him as moving away from the Whigs in the 1689—1690 parliament but only definitely reunited with The Tories in 1691, shortly before his death. The 2002 volume, covering 1690—1715, points out that as late as April 1691 the politically astute and independent Robert Harley had him marked as one of the Country Party.

=== The Convention Parliament ===
Leveson Gower was returned on 11 January 1689 for Newcastle-under-Lyme to the Convention Parliament. He made his first intervention on 1 February, moving that the House thank the Church of England clergy who had refused to collaborate with James II's religious policies.. This was carried and he and Thomas Done, the MP for Newtown, Isle of Wight, were deputed to take the resolution to the two archbishops. On 2 February Leveson Gower and Done brought back the archbishops' thanks and Leveson Gower was one of the members appointed to a committee to prepare for a conference with the House of Lords, on whether James II could be considered to have abdicated, leaving the throne vacant. This made clear Leveson Gower's commitment to the revolution, despite earlier hesitancy. This he expressed by consistently supporting the measures necessary to suppress opposition to William and Mary.

The House as a whole resolved on 28 February to "stand by and assist the King with their Lives and Fortunes, in supporting his Alliances abroad, in Reducing of Ireland, and in Defence of the Protestant Religion, and Laws of the Kingdom." Leveson Gower was ordered to the Lords for their concurrence. On 1 June he was nominated to a committee to investigate delays in sending relief for the Siege of Derry. His nephew, Thomas Gower, 3rd Baronet of Stittenham, had enlisted to defend the Revolution and was sent to Ireland, where he died on active service. This left Leveson Gower to inherit the Stittenham estates. He took part in the attack on Lord Halifax, the Lord Privy Seal, the chief minister most closely identified with the initial failures in Ireland. This cost him the peerage he might have expected in view of his wealth and experience.

=== The Second Parliament ===
Leveson Gower was returned as MP for Newcastle-under-Lyme on 4 March 1690, with Sir Thomas Bellot, as several times before. He was listed as a Whig by the Marquess of Carmarthen, then the leading figure in the administration. However, he did not vote with the Whigs consistently and his support for William and Mary was now more critical. On 1 April, in the Supply Committee, he moved to support the £1,400,000 the Court requested to prosecute the wars but, in reference to suspected corruption he said "I hope we shall not only empty their Pockets that have cheated us, but squeeze their Veins of their Blood, for the ill things they have done." When the king proposed to go to Ireland to take charge of the campaign in person, Leveson Gower opposed the idea, both because he was worried that the army was disloyal and because he was wary of the constitutional problems with a regency.

Henry Sydney, Viscount Sydney, Whig politician. Portrait by John Baptist Medina.

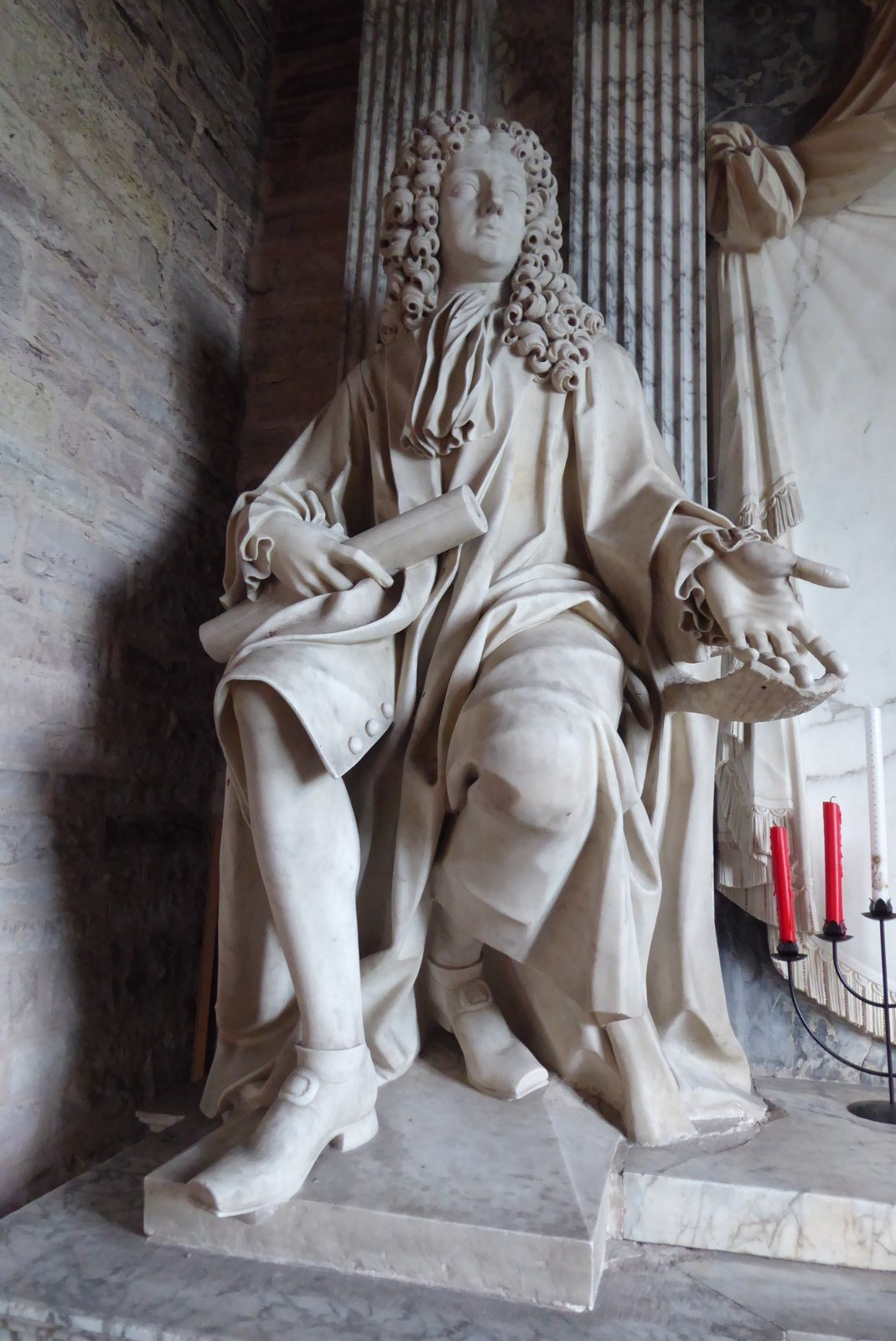
Effigy of Thomas Coningsby, St Mary's Church, Hope under Dinmore, Herefordshire.

During the summer recess the Whig strategists Thomas Coningsby, MP for Leominster, and Viscount Sydney wrote to William Bentinck, 1st Earl of Portland, the king's favourite, on ways to improve the management of Parliament. They specifically mentioned Leveson Gower as the potential leader of a middle party who might help in managing MPs of a similar mind. The records for the next session are sparse and give little evidence about his activities. In January 1691 his correspondence sounded a note of disillusion with politics. However the last few months of his life marked a return to active involvement in debate. He, like the Commons as a whole, was largely preoccupied by the financial implications of the Nine Years' War, the major European conflict in which the country had become entangled through William III's anti-French policies. On 9 November he was appointed to a committee to consider the Navy estimates for 1692, submitted with the aim of "carrying on a vigorous War against France." On November 18—19 he was actively involved in supply matters, this time to do with troop numbers. Then he was no longer heard in the House of Commons, as he had become seriously ill.

Leveson Gower was reported by the Whig lawyer John Pulteney, writing to Thomas Coningsby, to have suffered from a particularly painful stoppage of the urine, also described as strangury, often a symptom of bladder cancer. He rallied a little at the end of the month but died on 22 December. The date was implied by the diarist Narcissus Luttrell who, on Thursday 24 December, recorded that Leveson Gower had died on the previous Tuesday. His death was noted in the House of Commons, also on 24 December, when a writ was ordered for a by-election at Newcastle-under-Lyme.

== Family ==
Leveson-Gower married Lady Jane Granville (the eldest daughter of the 1st Earl of Bath) and they had five children:

- Katherine (1670–1704), who married Sir Edward Wyndham, 2nd Baronet,
- John Leveson-Gower, later 1st Baron Gower (1675–1709).
- Jane (d. 1725), who married the 4th Earl of Clarendon).
- Richard (died unmarried)
- William (died unmarried),

Leveson-Gower inherited his childless nephew's baronetcy in 1689 and on his own death two years later, was succeeded by his eldest surviving son, John.

Two of Leveson-Gower's well-known direct modern-day descendants are broadcaster Claire Balding and comedian Miranda Hart.

Parliament of England
Preceded by Sir Caesar Colclough, Bt; Edward Mainwaring	Member of Parliament for Newcastle-under-Lyme; 1675–1685; With: Sir Caesar Colclough, Bt 1675–1679; Sir Thomas Bellot, Bt 1679–1685	Succeeded by Edward Mainwaring; William Sneyd
Preceded by Richard Newport; Sir Vincent Corbet, Bt	Member of Parliament for Salop; 1681–1685; With: Richard Newport	Succeeded by Edward Kynaston; John Walcot
Preceded by Edward Mainwaring; William Sneyd	Member of Parliament for Newcastle-under-Lyme; 1689–1691; With: John Lawton 1689–1690; Sir Thomas Bellot, Bt 1690–1691	Succeeded by Sir Thomas Bellot, Bt; Sir John Leveson-Gower, Bt
Baronetage of England
Preceded by Thomas Gower	Baronet (of Stittenham); 1689–1691	Succeeded by John Leveson-Gower
