= Henry Hyde, Viscount Cornbury =

British author and politician

The Viscount Cornbury

Member of Parliament for Oxford University
- In office 1737–1750

Personal details
- Born: 28 November 1710
- Died: 28 May 1753 (aged 42)
- Parents: Henry Hyde, 4th Earl of Clarendon (father); Jane Hyde, Countess of Clarendon (mother)

Henry Hyde, Viscount Cornbury (28 November 1710 – 28 May 1753), styled Viscount Hyde from 1711 until 1723 and Viscount Cornbury thereafter, also 5th Baron Hyde in his own right, was a British author and politician who sat in the House of Commons from 1732 until 1750 when he was raised to the House of Lords by writ of acceleration. He was involved in Jacobite intrigues in the early 1730s.

== Early life ==
Hyde was the only surviving son of Henry Hyde, 4th Earl of Clarendon and his wife Jane Hyde, Countess of Clarendon, daughter of Sir William Leveson-Gower, 4th Baronet, of Stittenham. He matriculated at Christ Church, Oxford on 21 May 1725, from which he received a DCL on 6 December 1728. He was an author of some talent, and both Swift and Pope praised his character.

== Career ==
Cornbury involved himself in a Jacobite intrigue and went with James II's daughter, the Duchess of Buckingham, to Rome to meet the Pretender secretly in January 1731. He was returned as a Tory Member of Parliament for Oxford University, at a by-election on 26 February 1732. Walpole's Excise Bill of 1733 provoked great political unrest, and Cornbury thought the time right for a French-sponsored invasion by the Old Pretender. He was able to persuade Chavigny, the French ambassador to Britain, and Chauvelin, the French Secretary of State for Foreign Affairs, to endorse an invasion of southern England, which, Cornbury claimed, would result in a Jacobite rising in the country and the overthrow of the Hanoverians. However, the scheme was quashed in the royal cabinet by Cardinal Fleury, and Chavigny, some of whose activities had come to the attention of the British government, was recalled. Thereafter, Cornbury avoided Jacobite politics and devoted himself to the cultivation of taste.

Cornbury was returned unopposed at the 1734 British general election. He was active in his university's campaign against the mortmain bill of 1736, which would restrict the number of livings owned by charitable bodies and also restrict bequests of lands to them. In 1737 and 1738 he spoke against the army. At the 1741 British general election he was again returned unopposed for the University. In April 1742 he was offered a peerage, on Pulteney's recommendation, but refused it. He was absent at the division on the Hanoverian troops in November 1742, spoke for the Address in December 1743 and spoke for the Hanoverians in January 1744. He supported the loyal address on a threatened French invasion in February 1744. During the 1745 Jacobite rebellion, he voted against the government on the matter of recalling British troops from Flanders. He also opposed sending foreign troops to Scotland. In 1746, he voted against the Government on the Hanoverians . After being returned unopposed at the 1747 British general election he became disillusioned by the House of Commons, and took a year abroad for the sake of his health. He also sold property to pay his debts. In 1750, he applied to the King for a peerage and he was elevated to the House of Lords by a writ in acceleration in his father's title of Baron Hyde. He vacated his seat in the House of Commons.

== Death and legacy ==
Cornbury died unmarried in Paris on 26 April 1753, predeceasing his father by six months; accounts differ on whether he died from a fall from a horse or by his own hand.

Parliament of Great Britain
Preceded by William Bromley; George Clarke	Member of Parliament for Oxford University; 1737–1750; With: George Clarke 1732–1737; William Bromley 1737; Edward Butler 1737–1745; Peregrine Palmer 1745–1750	Succeeded by Peregrine Palmer; Sir Roger Newdigate, Bt
Peerage of England
Preceded by Henry Hyde	Baron Hyde (writ in acceleration); 1750–1753	Succeeded by Henry Hyde
