= John Villiers, 3rd Earl of Clarendon =

British politician

The Right Honourable The Earl of Clarendon PC

Justice in Eyre North of Trent
- In office 30 October 1790 – 22 December 1838
- Monarchs: George III, George IV, William IV, Victoria
- Preceded by: The Viscount Falmouth
- Succeeded by: Office abolished

Personal details
- Born: 14 November 1757
- Died: 22 December 1838 (aged 81)
- Spouse: Maria Eleanor Forbes (m. 1791)
- Children: Lady Mary Harriet Villiers
- Parents: Thomas Villiers, 1st Earl of Clarendon (father); Charlotte Villiers, Countess of Clarendon (mother)

John Charles Villiers, 3rd Earl of Clarendon, PC (14 November 1757 – 22 December 1838) was a British peer and Member of Parliament from the Villiers family.

== Biography ==
Villiers was born on 14 December 1757, the second son of Lady Charlotte, daughter of William Capel, 3rd Earl of Essex, and Thomas Villiers, 1st Earl of Clarendon. He was educated at Eton and St John's College, Cambridge and graduated with an MA in 1776 and an LL.D on 30 April 1833. He was called to the bar at Lincoln's Inn on 22 June 1779.

In January 1784 Lord Camelford (probably at Pitt the Elder's request) brought Villiers into Parliament at a by-election for Old Sarum, and he represented that rotten borough until 1790, and then sat for Dartmouth 1790–1802, and for the Tain Burghs from 1802 until 27 May 1805, when he accepted the Chiltern Hundreds (in order to resign his Parliamentary seat). He was afterwards member for Queenborough 1807–1812 and 1820–1824. Villiers did not make his mark in Parliament as a debater, and was styled "a mere courtier, famous for telling interminable long stories".

The Rolliad notices him as "Villiers, comely with the flaxen hair", and likens him to the Nereus of Homer. Sir Nathaniel Wraxall also styles him the "Nereus" of Pitt's forces, and mentions him as a staunch supporter of that minister, to whose friendship entirely he owed his appointment for life in February 1790 to the lucrative sinecure of warden and chief justice in eyre of all the royal forests, chaces, parks, and warrens north of Trent.

On 6 February 1782 Villiers was made joint King's Counsel in the Duchy Court of Lancaster by his father, who then was Chancellor of the Duchy. From 29 July 1786 until his succession to the peerage he was Surveyor of Woods south of the Trent of the Duchy of Lancaster. He was added to the Privy Council and made Comptroller of the King's Household on 19 February 1787. This position at court he filled for three years, and on 24 February 1790 he was made a Commissioner of the Board of Trade. He was Recorder and Under-Steward of New Windsor from 1789 to 1806.

When the rise of the French Republic caused apprehensions in Britain, Villiers was appointed colonel of the First Regiment of Fencible Cavalry on 14 March 1794, and was granted the rank of colonel in the army during service in the field. He was made first Prothonotary of the Common Pleas in the County Palatine of Lancaster in June 1804, and held the office until his death. From 27 November 1808 to 10 January 1810 Villiers was envoy to the court of Portugal. On the death of his eldest brother, Thomas, unmarried, on 7 March 1824, he succeeded him as 3rd Earl of Clarendon and as a count of the Kingdom of Prussia, but took little part afterwards in public life, devoting himself to religious and charitable works.

He died suddenly, aged 81, at his residence, Walmer Terrace, Deal, Kent, on 22 December 1838, and was buried at Watford on 29 December.

Villiers was succeeded in the earldom by his nephew, George Villiers, who became a distinguished Liberal statesman.

== Family ==
Lord Clarendon married on 5 January 1791 his maternal first cousin Maria Eleanor Forbes, the daughter of Admiral John Forbes (1714–1796) and Lady Mary Capell. His mother Lady Charlotte Capell and Lady Mary Capell were sisters, both the daughters of William Capell, 3rd Earl of Essex, and Lady Jane Hyde. The marriage produced one child, Lady Mary Harriet Villiers, who died on 20 January 1835, unmarried.

== See also ==
- List of abolitionist forerunners

Parliament of Great Britain
Preceded by Pinckney Wilkinson; Thomas Pitt	Member of Parliament for Old Sarum; 1784–1790; With: Pinckney Wilkinson Jan – Mar 1784; George Hardinge 1784–1790	Succeeded by George Hardinge; John Sullivan
Preceded by Edmund Bastard; Richard Hopkins	Member of Parliament for Dartmouth; 1790–1801; With: Edmund Bastard	Succeeded by Parliament of the United Kingdom
Parliament of the United Kingdom
Preceded by Parliament of Great Britain	Member of Parliament for Dartmouth; 1801–1802; With: Edmund Bastard	Succeeded by Edmund Bastard; Arthur Howe Holdsworth
Preceded by William Dundas	Member of Parliament for Tain Burghs; 1802–1805	Succeeded by James MacDonald
Preceded by William Frankland; Sir Samuel Romilly	Member of Parliament for Queenborough; 1807–1812; With: Joseph Hunt 1807–1810; Richard Wellesley 1810 – Jan 1812; Sir Robert Moorsom Jan – Oct 1812	Succeeded by Sir Robert Moorsom; John Osborn
Preceded by Sir Robert Moorsom; Hon. Edmund Phipps	Member of Parliament for Queenborough; 1822–1824; With: George Peter Holford	Succeeded by Lord Frederick Cavendish-Bentinck; George Peter Holford
Honorary titles
Preceded by The Earl of Derby	Senior Privy Counsellor; 1834–1838	Succeeded by The Lord St Helens
Legal offices
Preceded by The Viscount Falmouth	Justice in Eyre north of the Trent; 1790–1838	Office abolished
Peerage of Great Britain
Preceded by Thomas Villiers	Earl of Clarendon; 1824–1838	Succeeded by George Villiers
