= Catherine Douglas, Duchess of Queensberry =

English noblewoman (1701–1777)

Catherine Douglas
- Duchess of Queensberry
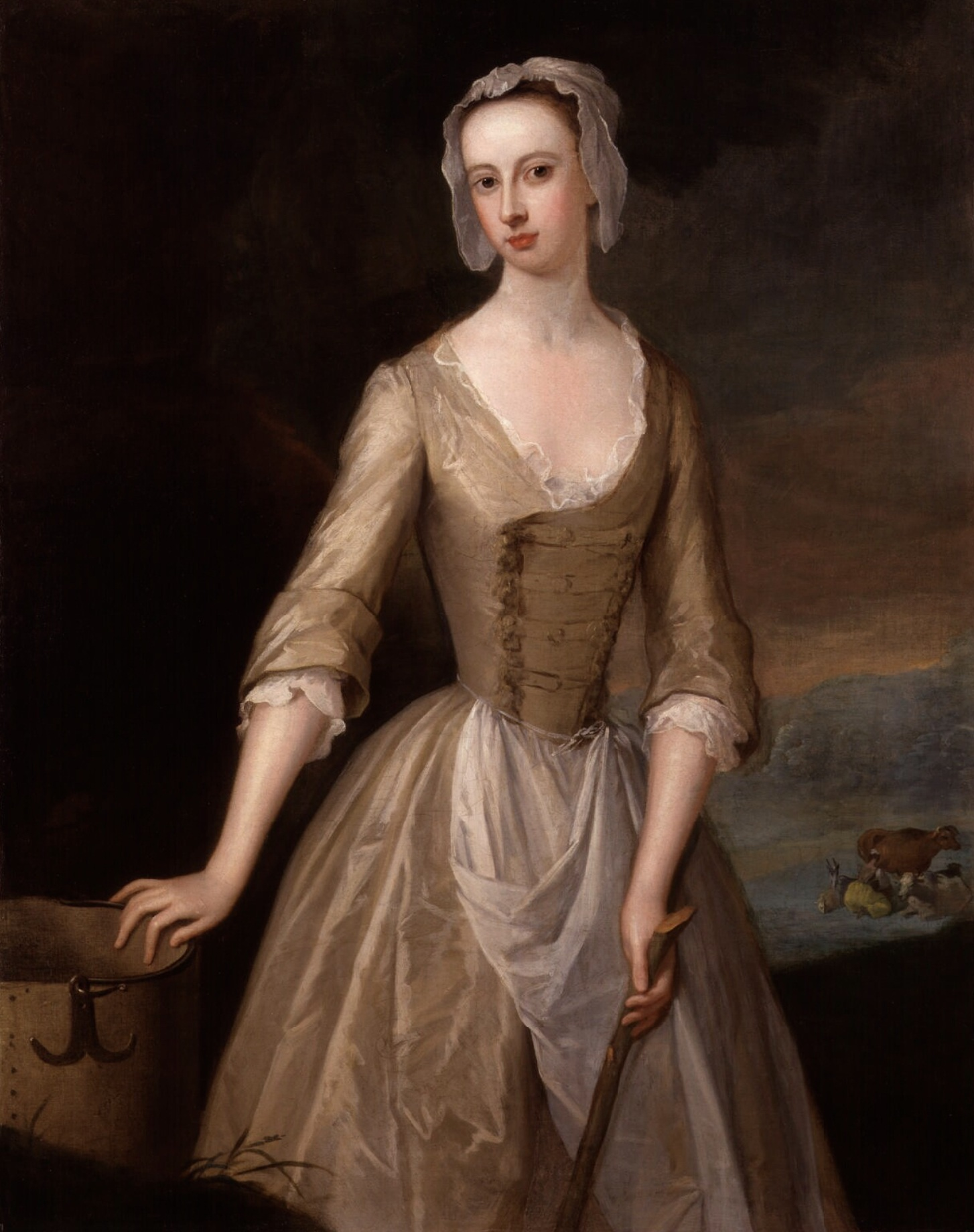
- Portrait attributed to Charles Jervas, c. 1725–1730
- Born: Hon. Catherine Hyde; 1701
- Died: 17 June 1777 (aged 75–76)
- Spouse: Charles Douglas, 3rd Duke of Queensberry
- Issue: Henry Douglas, Earl of Drumlanrig; Charles Douglas, Earl of Drumlanrig
- Father: Henry Hyde, 4th Earl of Clarendon
- Mother: Jane Hyde, Countess of Clarendon

Catherine Douglas, Duchess of Queensberry (née Hyde; 1701 – 17 July 1777) was an English noblewoman.

== Biography ==
Catherine Hyde, often called "Kitty", was the second daughter of Henry Hyde, 4th Earl of Clarendon, and his wife, the former Jane Leveson-Gower. She served as a Lady of the Bedchamber at the court of Queen Anne. Catherine married Charles Douglas, 3rd Duke of Queensberry, on 10 March 1720. The couple had two sons and lived much of the time at Douglas House, Petersham, now part of London and at Queensberry House in Edinburgh. The duchess was known for her beauty and fashion sense. She was a central figure in London high society and was known for her balls and masquerades. According to the standards of her era, she was considered eccentric. She never served meat at any of her suppers. On at least one occasion, she ordered half of her guests to leave her party because she disliked their company.

In 1728, she was banished from court by King George II for being too forward, after petitioning the king and queen on behalf of John Gay, whose satirical play Polly had been refused a licence. In response, she wrote, "The Duchess of Queensberry is surprised and well pleased that the King hath given her so agreeable a command as to stay from Court." In her later years, she attracted attention for dressing in the same fashion as in her youth, which was considered eccentric, refusing 'to cut and curl my hair like a sheep's head, or wear one of their trolloping sacks'. She was reportedly fond of wearing an apron, as shown in a portrait of her painted by Charles Jervas in the 1720s. According to Oliver Goldsmith, Beau Nash, the master of ceremonies at Bath, once took the apron from her and threw it away, saying that only "Abigails" (maids) wore aprons. She was still reported to be wearing one when she met Horace Walpole in 1749.

The duchess was a friend to many members of the English and Scottish literary community, including Gay, William Congreve, James Thompson, Alexander Pope, Matthew Prior, and William Whitehead. Many of these literary friends placed references to her in their poems and other works; Ramsay wrote a poem on the departure of Katherine, Duchess of Queensberry, from Scotland in 1734. Hyde was also said to have had influence over Prime Minister William Pitt, 1st Earl of Chatham.

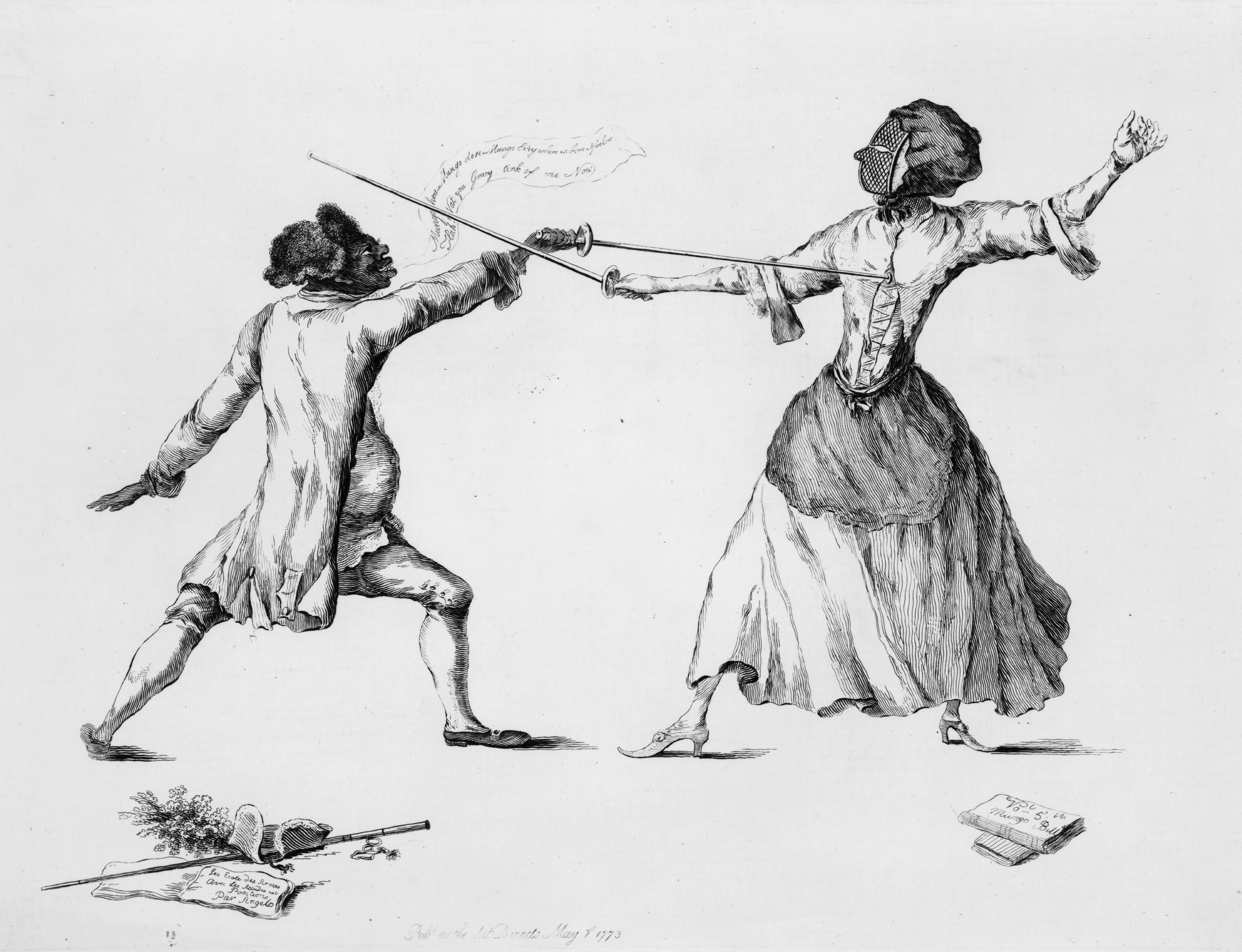
1773 cartoon of Queensberry fencing with Julius Soubise

In 1764, Julius Soubise, a slave born in Saint Kitts, was given to the duchess by the Royal Navy captain Stair Douglas, a relative of hers, and she manumitted him. He was renamed after Charles, Prince of Soubise by the duchess. She gave Soubise a privileged life, treating him as if he were her own son – apparently with her husband's blessing. Soubise became the riding and fencing master to the duchess. He became a popular acquaintance of young noblemen and rose as a figure in upper-class social circles, becoming the member of many fashionable clubs such as the Thatched House Club. The personal favour and patronage of the duchess allowed Soubise a lifestyle of socializing and fashion. It was rumoured that his relationship with the Duchess developed into a sexual one.

William Austin's 1773 satirical print, The Duchess of Queensberry and Soubise shows the pair engaged in a fencing match. Austin's engraving was based on illustrations of fencing compiled by the Angelo fencing dynasty, combined with accounts of Soubise from Henry Angelo's memoir. These accounts were satirized by Austin in a way which addresses Soubise and the duchess' uncustomary relationship, depicting Soubise as Mungo, a blackface servant character from Charles Dibdin and Isaac Bickerstaffe's play The Padlock. In the print, text shows Soubise saying, "Mungo here, Mungo dere, Mungo every where; Above and below. Hah! Vat your gracy tink of me now?,” direct lines from the Mungo character. This work has reappeared historically under several titles, including "The Eccentric Duchess of Queensberry fencing with her protégé the Creole Soubise (otherwise 'Mungo')” and "The Duchess of Queensberry playing at foils with her favorite Lap Dog Mungo after Expending near £10,000 to make him a—.”
