= Jane Hyde, Countess of Clarendon =

The Countess of Clarendon
- Born: 1669
- Died: 24 May 1725 (aged 55–56)
- Spouse: Henry Hyde, 4th Earl of Clarendon
- Issue: 8, including Jane, Catherine and Henry
- Father: Sir William Leveson-Gower, 4th Baronet
- Mother: Lady Jane Granville

Jane Hyde, Countess of Clarendon (née Leveson-Gower; 1669 – 24 May 1725), formerly Jane Leveson-Gower, was the wife of Henry Hyde, 4th Earl of Clarendon.

== Biography ==
Jane was born in 1669. She was the daughter of Sir William Leveson-Gower, 4th Baronet, and his wife, the former Lady Jane Granville, and she married Hyde, then MP for Launceston, on 8 March 1692. He succeeded as Earl of Rochester in 1711, and as Earl of Clarendon on 31 March 1723.

== Family ==
Her children were:

- Hon. Henrietta Hyde (bur. 5 July 1710)
- Hon. Edward Hyde (bur. 17 November 1702)
- Hon. Laurence Hyde (b. 6 October 1703; bur. 27 May 1704)
- Hon. Ann Hyde (bur. 2 November 1709)
- Lady Jane Hyde (1694 – January 1724), married William Capell, 3rd Earl of Essex on 27 November 1718
- Lady Catherine Hyde (c. 1701 – 17 July 1777), married Charles Douglas, 3rd Duke of Queensberry on 10 March 1720
- Lady Charlotte Hyde (c.1707 – 17 March 1740)
- Henry Hyde, Viscount Cornbury (1710–1753)

Her portrait, after Sir Godfrey Kneller, hangs in the Royal Collection.
