= William Capell, 3rd Earl of Essex =

British courtier and diplomat

The Right Honourable The Earl of Essex KG KT PC
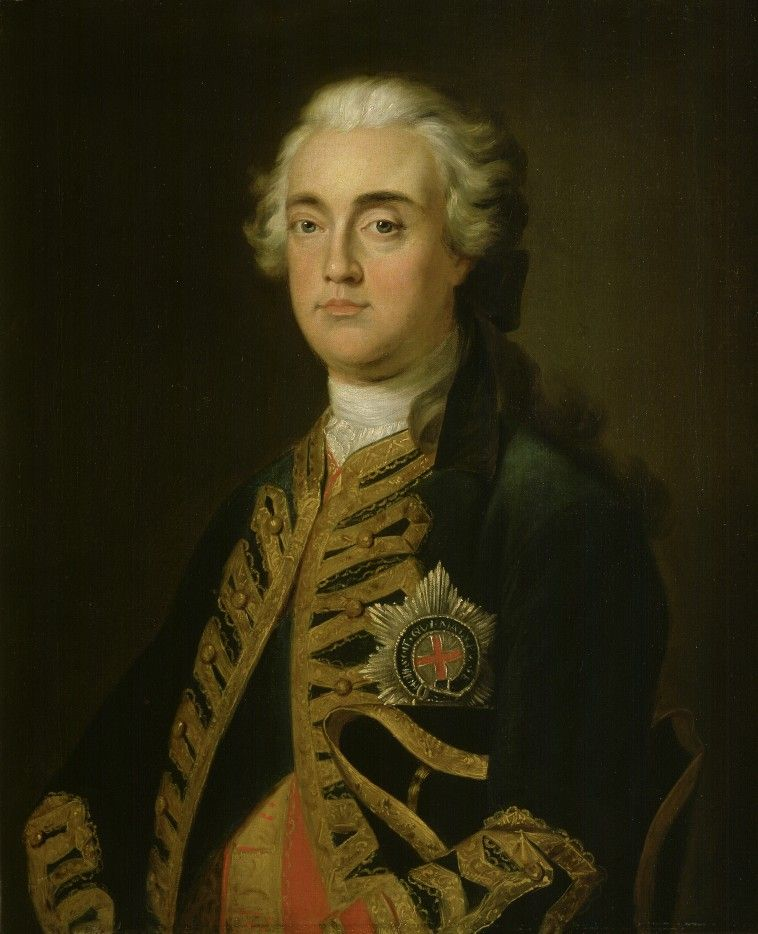
- Portrait by George Knapton, c. 1735

Lord Lieutenant of Hertfordshire
- In office 1722–1743
- Preceded by: The 1st Earl Cowper
- Succeeded by: The 2nd Earl Cowper

Personal details
- Born: William Capell; 11 January 1697
- Died: 8 January 1743 (aged 45)
- Spouses: Lady Jane Hyde (m. 1718; died 1724) Lady Elizabeth Russell (m. 1726)
- Children: Lady Charlotte Capell; Lady Mary Capell; William Capell, 4th Earl of Essex
- Parent(s): Algernon Capell, 2nd Earl of Essex; Lady Mary Bentinck

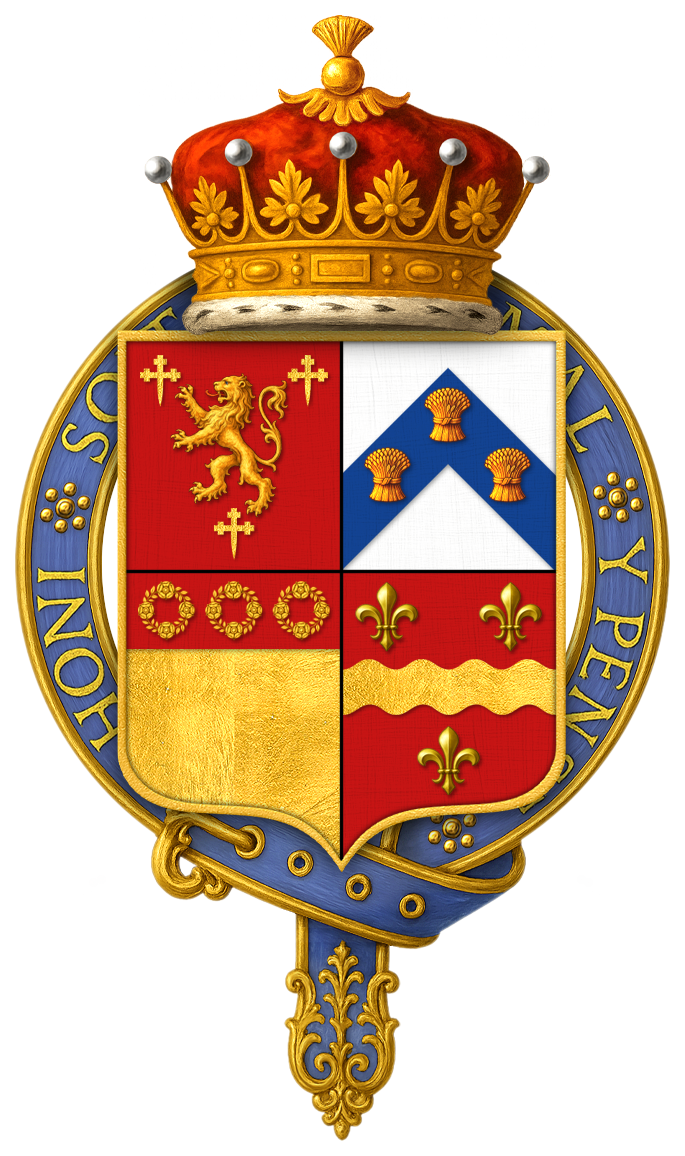
Quartered arms of William Capell, 3rd Earl of Essex, KG

William Capell, 3rd Earl of Essex (11 January 1697 – 8 January 1743) was a British courtier and diplomat who served as the British ambassador to Sardinia from 1732 to 1736.

== Early life ==
He was the son of the 2nd Earl of Essex and Lady Mary Bentinck. His younger sister, Lady Mary Capel, married Alan Brodrick, 2nd Viscount Midleton. After his father's death, his mother remarried Rt. Hon. Sir Conyers Darcy (d. 1758), son of Hon. John Darcy.

His paternal grandparents were Arthur Capell, 1st Earl of Essex and Lady Elizabeth Percy (a daughter of Algernon Percy, 10th Earl of Northumberland). His mother was the eldest daughter of William Bentinck, 1st Earl of Portland and Anne Villiers (the fourth daughter, by his first wife, of Sir Edward Villiers, Knight Marshal of the Royal Household).

== Career ==
Capell was one of the founding governors of the charity, the Foundling Hospital, created in October 1739 to care for abandoned children.

Lord Essex was a Gentleman of the Bedchamber to the Prince of Wales from c. 1718 to 1727; Lord Lieutenant of Hertfordshire from 1722 to c. 1742. He was made a Knight of the Thistle on 2 February 1724 but resigned in 1738. He served as Ranger of St James's Park from 1727 to 1739 and Ranger of Hyde Park from 1728 to 1739.

He served as the British ambassador to Sardinia from 1732 to 1736. He was made a Privy Councillor c. 1734, a Knight of the Garter c. 1737, and was Captain of the Yeomen of the Guard from 1739 until his death in 1743.

== Personal life ==
On 27 November 1718, Capell married Lady Jane Hyde, a Lady of the Bedchamber to the Princess of Wales and the third daughter of the 4th Earl of Clarendon. Before Lady Jane died in 1724, they were the parents of two children:

- Lady Charlotte Capell (1721–1790), who married Thomas Villiers, 1st Earl of Clarendon.
- Lady Mary Capell (d. 1782), who married Admiral of the Fleet Hon. John Forbes, a son of George Forbes, 3rd Earl of Granard.

On 3 February 1726, William was married to Lady Elizabeth Russell, a daughter of the 2nd Duke of Bedford and the former Elizabeth Howland (daughter and heiress of John Howland of Streatham). Together, they had one surviving son:

- William Anne Capell, 4th Earl of Essex (1732–1799), who married Frances Hanbury Williams, daughter of Charles Hanbury Williams. After her death, he married Harriet Bladen, a daughter of Col. Thomas Bladen.

Lord Essex died on 8 January 1743. His titles and estates were inherited by his ten-year-old son, William.

=== Descendants ===
Through his second daughter, he was a grandfather of two girls, Maria Eleanor Forbes who married John Villiers, 3rd Earl of Clarendon, and Katherine Elizabeth Forbes who married William Wellesley-Pole, 3rd Earl of Mornington.

Political offices
Preceded by The Duke of Manchester	Captain of the Yeomen of the Guard; 1739–1743	Succeeded by The Lord Berkeley of Stratton
Honorary titles
Preceded by The 1st Earl Cowper	Lord Lieutenant of Hertfordshire; 1722–1743	Vacant Title next held by The 2nd Earl Cowper
Peerage of England
Preceded by Algernon Capell	Earl of Essex; 1710–1743	Succeeded by William Capell
