= Charlotte Villiers, Countess of Clarendon =

The Countess of Clarendon
- Born: 2 October 1721
- Died: 3 September 1790 (aged 68)
- Spouse: Thomas Villiers, 1st Earl of Clarendon
- Children: 4, including Thomas, John, George Villiers
- Parents: William Capell, 3rd Earl of Essex (father); Jane Capell, Countess of Essex (mother)

Charlotte Villiers, Countess of Clarendon (2 October 1721 – 3 September 1790), formerly Lady Charlotte Capell, was the wife of Thomas Villiers.

== Biography ==
Charlotte was the daughter of William Capell, 3rd Earl of Essex, and his wife, Jane Hyde.

Charlotte married Thomas Villiers, the son of William Villiers, 2nd Earl of Jersey, on 30 March 1752. He would later be raised to the peerage as Baron Hyde and subsequently as Earl of Clarendon, both titles that originated from his wife's family.

From 1756, when her husband acquired the barony, she was known as Lady Hyde of Hindon, and from 1776, when the earldom of Clarendon was revived for him, she became Countess of Clarendon. She was taken ill and died at Stony Stratford, aged 68, and was buried at St Mary's Church, Watford, along with other members of the Capell family.

Robert Grimston, 1st Baron Grimston of Westbury's daughter, the Hon. Rosemary Sybella Violet Grimston, married the actor Charles Edward Underdown, on the 10th. February 1953. Charles Edward Underdown and Rosemary Grimston were sixth cousins, through their common ancestors Thomas Villiers, 1st Earl of Clarendon, and Lady Charlotte Capell, according to Burke's Peerage, (Volume 2, page 1685, 107th. edition,

== Family ==
Thomas and Charlotte had four children:

- Thomas Villiers, 2nd Earl of Clarendon (25 December 1753 – 7 March 1824).
- John Villiers, 3rd Earl of Clarendon (14 November 1757 – 22 December 1838).
- George Villiers (23 November 1759 – 21 March 1827). Father of George Villiers, 4th Earl of Clarendon.
- Lady Charlotte Barbara Villiers (27 March 1761 – 9 April 1810).
