= Thomas Villiers, 2nd Earl of Clarendon =

British politician and military officer (1753–1824)

The Right Honourable The Earl of Clarendon
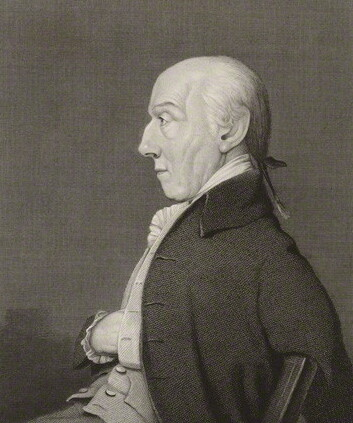
- Engraving of Clarendon by William Bond after a Robert Trewick Bone portrait
- Born: 25 December 1753
- Died: 7 March 1824 (aged 70)
- Education: Eton College; St John's College, Cambridge
- Occupation: Politician
- Term: 1786–1824
- Predecessor: Thomas Villiers, 1st Earl of Clarendon
- Successor: John Charles Villiers

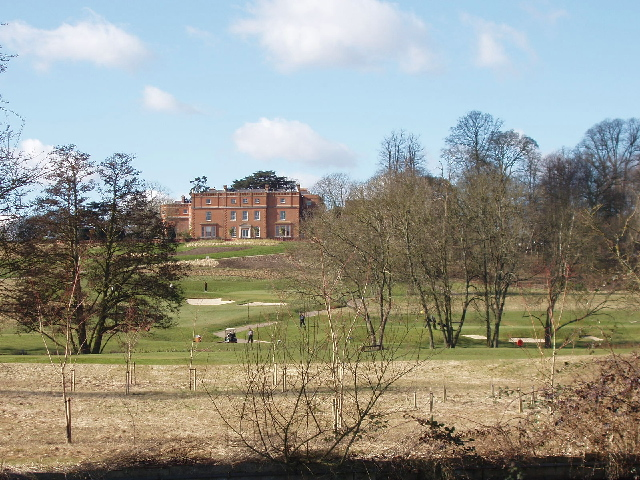
The Grove, Watford. Now an hotel

Captain Thomas Villiers, 2nd Earl of Clarendon (25 December 1753 – 7 March 1824), styled as Lord Hyde from 1776 to 1786, was a British Tory politician and military officer who represented Christchurch and Helston in the House of Commons of Great Britain between 1774 and 1786.

== Life ==
Clarendon was the eldest son of Thomas Villiers, 1st Earl of Clarendon, and his wife Lady Charlotte Capell, and was educated at Eton and St John's College, Cambridge. He was elected to the House of Commons for Christchurch in 1774, a seat he held until 1780. He later represented Helston between 1781 and 1786, when he succeeded his father in the earldom and entered the House of Lords. He served as a cornet in the Western Troop, Hertfordshire Yeomanry, under the command of his younger brother George, and when George resigned he was promoted to captain to command in his place. He lived at The Grove, a country house near Watford, Hertfordshire. Lord Clarendon died in March 1824, aged 70. He never married and was succeeded in his titles by his younger brother John Charles Villiers.

== Notes ==
Parliament of Great Britain
Preceded by James Harris; James Harris	Member of Parliament for Christchurch; 1774–1780; With: James Harris	Succeeded by James Harris; James Harris
Preceded by Philip Yorke; Richard Barwell	Member of Parliament for Helston; 1781–1786; With: Richard Barwell 1781–1784; John Rogers 1784–1786	Succeeded by Roger Wilbraham; James Burges
Peerage of Great Britain
Preceded by Thomas Villiers	Earl of Clarendon; 2nd creation 1786–1824	Succeeded by John Charles Villiers
