= Tintern Abbey, County Wexford =

Cistercian abbey in Wexford, Ireland

Tintern Abbey
- Mainistir Thinteirn
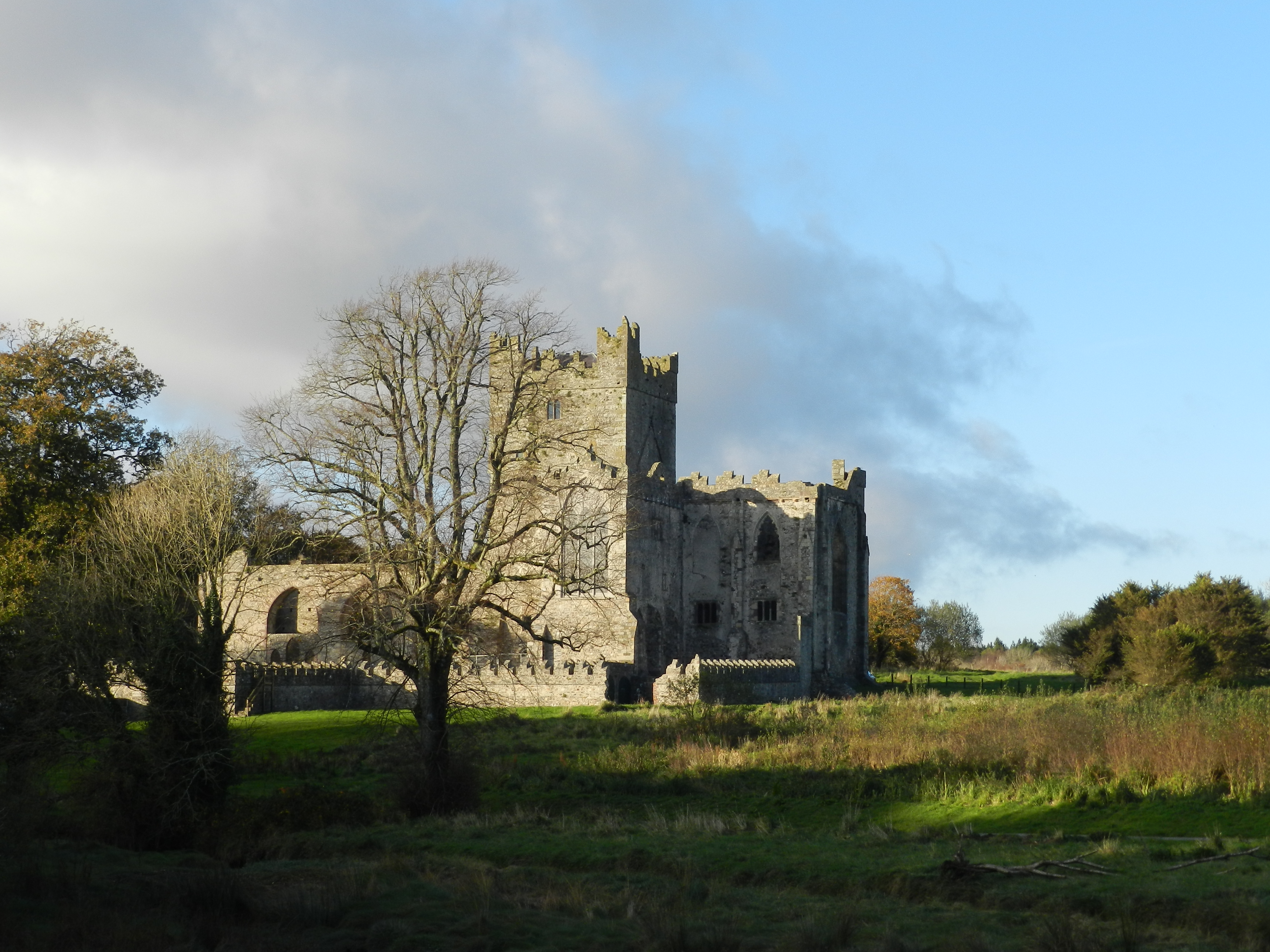
- Southern face

- Location within Ireland
- Interactive map of Tintern Abbey

Monastery information
- Other name: Tintern de Voto
- Order: Cistercians
- Established: c.1200
- Disestablished: 25 July 1539
- Mother house: Tintern Abbey, Monmouthshire
- Diocese: Ferns

People
- Founder: William Marshal, 1st Earl of Pembroke

Architecture
- Functional status: Abandoned
- Style: Cistercian

Site
- Location: Hook Peninsula, County Wexford, Ireland
- Coordinates: 52.237°N 6.838°W
- Public access: yes

Tintern Abbey was a Cistercian abbey located on the Hook Peninsula, County Wexford, Ireland.

The Abbey – which is today in ruins, some of which have been restored – was founded in c.1200 by William Marshal, Earl of Pembroke, as the result of a vow he had made when his boat was caught in a storm nearby. While the specific date of foundation is unconfirmed in some sources, in a 1917 analysis for the Royal Irish Academy, church historian J. H. Bernard suggests a foundation date of 3 December 1200.

Once established, the abbey was colonised by monks from the Cistercian abbey at Tintern in Monmouthshire, Wales, of which Marshal was also patron. To distinguish the two, the mother house in Wales was sometimes known as "Tintern Major" and the abbey in Ireland as "Tintern de Voto" (Tintern of the vow).

After the Dissolution of the Monasteries the abbey and its grounds were granted firstly to Sir James Croft, and then in 1575 to Anthony Colclough of Staffordshire, a soldier of Henry VIII. His descendants became the Colclough Baronets. The final member of the Colclough family to reside at Tintern was Lucey Marie Biddulph Colclough and, after she left in 1959, the Irish state started conservation and consolidation works on the site.

Between 1982 and 2007, the National Monuments service of the Office of Public Works undertook a number of excavation and heritage development efforts at the abbey, including special conservation measures for local bat colonies. Additional works were undertaken after a fire in the site's visitor centre in 2012, which damaged part of the 19th century outbuildings on the abbey's grounds.

== Gallery ==
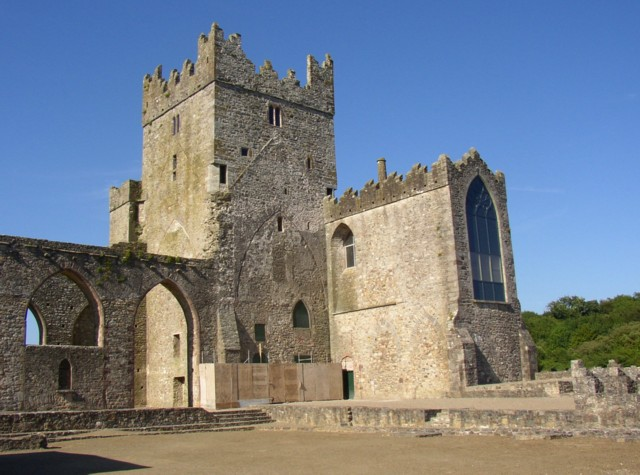
Tintern abbey

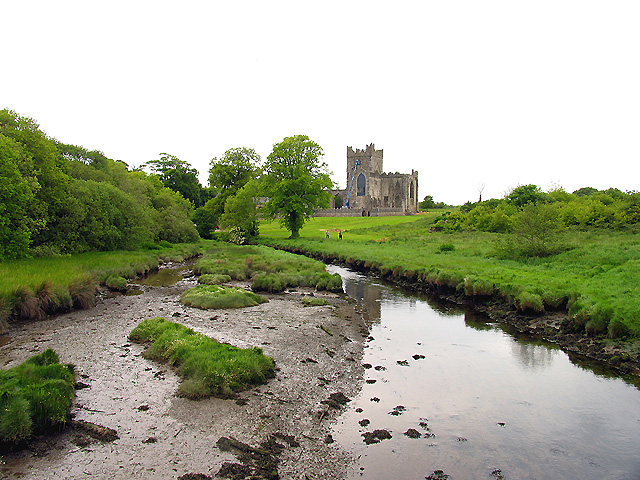
Grounds and river

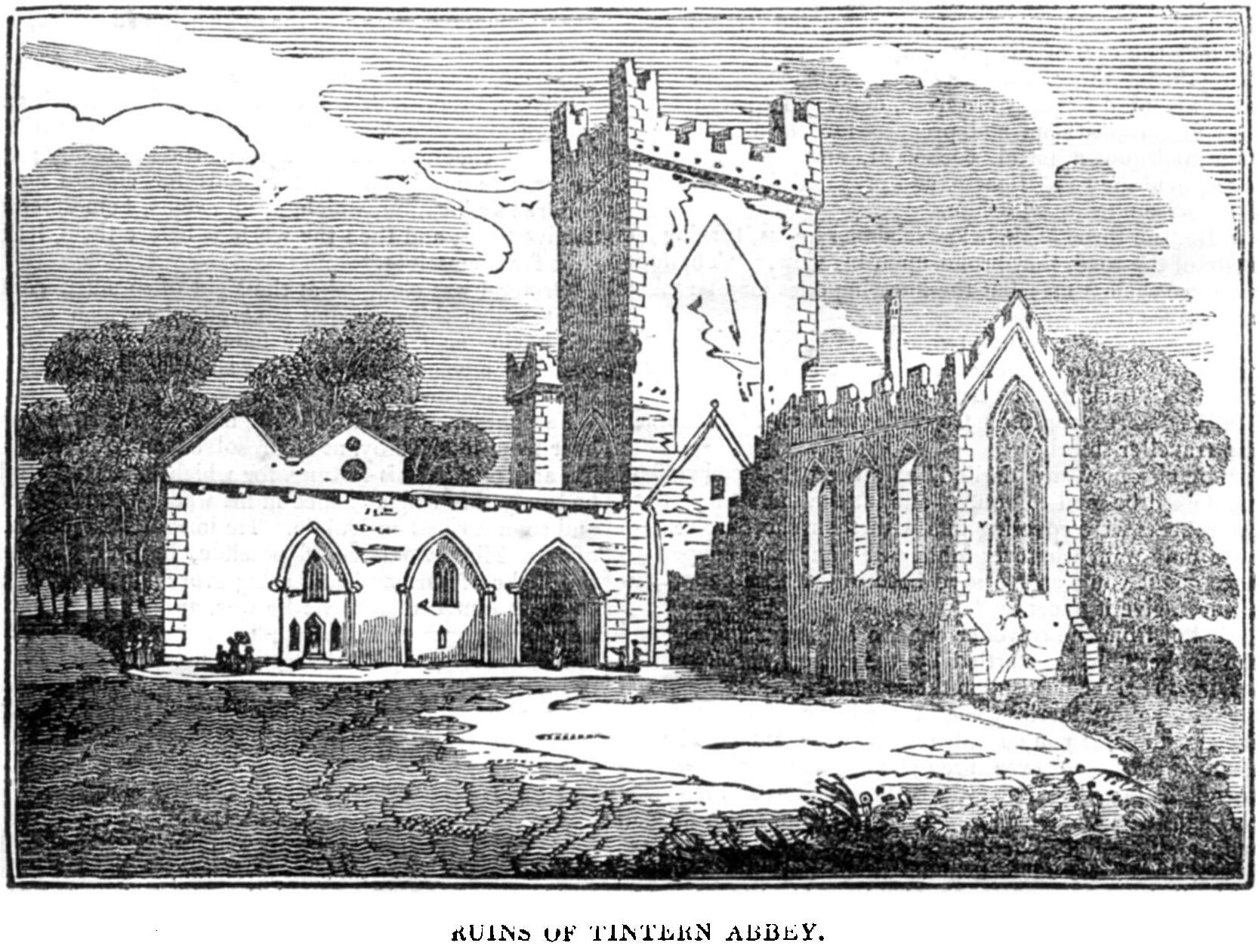
Dublin Penny Journal, 1834

== See also ==
- List of abbeys and priories in Ireland (County Wexford)
