= Henry Hyde, 4th Earl of Clarendon =

English Army officer and Tory politician

The Right Honourable The Earl of Clarendon PC
- Attributed to George Knapton

Member of Parliament for Launceston
- In office 1692–1711

Lord Lieutenant of Cornwall
- In office 1711–1714

High Steward of Oxford University
- In office 1711–1753

Personal details
- Born: June 1672
- Died: 10 December 1753
- Party: Tory
- Spouse: Jane Leveson-Gower
- Children: 8, including Jane, Catherine, and Henry
- Parents: Laurence Hyde, 1st Earl of Rochester (father); Henrietta Hyde, Countess of Rochester (mother)
- Education: Eton College

Henry Hyde, 4th Earl of Clarendon and 2nd Earl of Rochester, PC (June 1672 – 10 December 1753), styled Lord Hyde from 1682 to 1711, was an English Army officer and Tory politician who sat in the English and British House of Commons from 1692 until 1711 when he succeeded to the peerage as Earl of Rochester.

== Early life ==
Hyde was the son of the 1st Earl of Rochester and Lady Henrietta Boyle, daughter of the 1st Earl of Burlington. He was educated at Eton from 1683 to 1687. From 1687 to 1690 he travelled abroad to Italy, Germany and the Dutch Republic. In 1690 he was Governor of the Merchant Adventurers. He joined the army and was guidon and major in the 2nd Troop of Horse Guards in October 1691 and cornet and major from December 1691 and served as a volunteer in Flanders in 1691 and 1692.

He married Jane Leveson-Gower, daughter of Sir William Leveson-Gower, 4th Baronet, on 8 March 1692. She served as a Lady of the Bedchamber at the court of Queen Anne.

== Career ==
Hyde was returned by his father as Member of Parliament for Launceston on the Granville interest at a by-election on 15 November 1692. He then resigned his army commission. He was returned for Launceston again at the 1695 English general election. He voted against fixing the price of guineas at 22 shillings, and against the attainder of Sir John Fenwick, on 25 November 1696. After his return at the 1698 English general election, he was classed as a Country supporter. In 1700, he was awarded DCL at Oxford University together with his father in a specially called convention. He was returned unopposed at the first general election of 1701, and was blacklisted for opposing preparations for war with France. He was returned unopposed again at the second general election of 1701 and supported the motion of 26 February 1702 which vindicated the Commons' proceedings in impeaching Whig ministers. At the 1702 English general election he was returned again unopposed. From 1703 to 1710 he was first clerk of writs in Chancery. He was absent from the vote on the Tack in 1704 and was classed as a sneaker. He was returned unopposed as a Tory at the 1705 English general election and voted against the court candidate for speaker on 25 October 1705. He was returned again as a Tory at the 1708 British general election. He told for the Tories in two election disputes and voted against the impeachment of Dr Sacheverell. He was returned again for Launceston at the 1710 British general election. In September 1710 he became joint vice-treasurer and paymaster-general for Ireland. He was also appointed to the Privy Council of Great Britain in 1710. However, he succeeded his father as 2nd Earl of Rochester on 2 May 1711 and vacated his seat in the House of Commons. He continued to serve the Tory ministry in the House of Lords.

As Lord Rochester he received several appointments in 1711. He was Lord Lieutenant of Cornwall to 1714, a Commissioner for building fifty new churches to 1715, Keeper of Richmond New Park to 1727, and High Steward of Oxford University from 1711 for the rest of his life. In 1719 he was one of main subscribers in the Royal Academy of Music (1719), a corporation that produced baroque opera on stage. He succeeded his cousin as 4th Earl of Clarendon on 31 March 1723.

== Later life and legacy ==
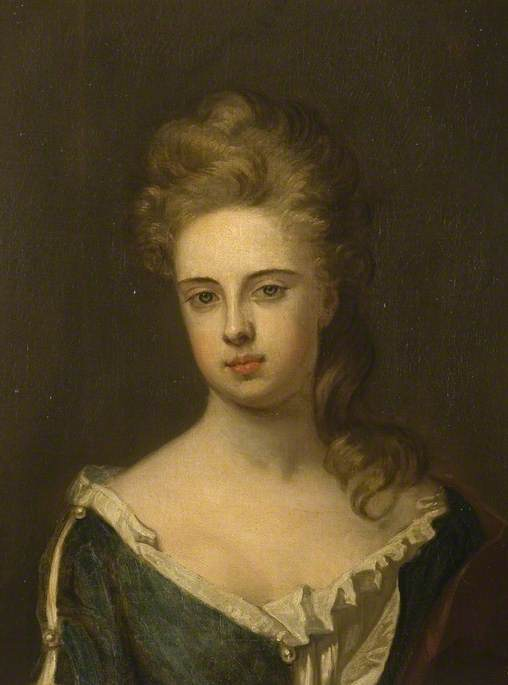
Henry Hyde married Jane Leveson-Gower, with whom he had several children, including Jane (pictured).

By his wife Jane, he had children:

- Hon. Henrietta Hyde (bur. 5 July 1710)
- Hon. Edward Hyde (bur. 17 November 1702)
- Hon. Laurence Hyde (b. 6 October 1703; bur. 27 May 1704)
- Hon. Ann Hyde (bur. 2 November 1709)
- Lady Jane Hyde (d. January 1723/1724), married William Capell, 3rd Earl of Essex on 27 November 1718
- Lady Catherine Hyde (c. 1701 – 17 July 1777), married Charles Douglas, 3rd Duke of Queensberry on 10 March 1720
- Lady Charlotte Hyde (c.1707 – 17 March 1740)
- Henry Hyde, Viscount Cornbury (1710–1753)

Lord Rochester died on 10 December 1753, and was buried at Wootton Bassett. His last surviving son Henry Hyde, Lord Cornbury died nine months before him and consequently both earldoms became extinct.

Parliament of England
Preceded by William Harbord; Bernard Granville	Member of Parliament for Launceston; 1692 – 1707; With: Bernard Granville 1692–1695; William Cary 1695–1707	Succeeded by Parliament of Great Britain
Parliament of Great Britain
Preceded by Parliament of England	Member of Parliament for Launceston; 1707 – 1711; With: William Cary 1707–1710; Francis Scobell 1710–1711	Succeeded by Francis Scobell; George Clarke
Honorary titles
Preceded by The Earl of Rochester	Lord Lieutenant and Custos Rotulorum of Cornwall; 1711 – 1714	Succeeded by The Earl of Radnor
Preceded by The Viscount Bolingbroke	Senior Privy Counsellor; 1751–1753	Succeeded by Sir James Lowther, Bt
Peerage of England
Preceded by Edward Hyde	Earl of Clarendon; 1723–1753	Extinct
Preceded by Lawrence Hyde	Earl of Rochester; 1711–1753	Extinct
Preceded by Edward Hyde	Baron Hyde (descended by acceleration); 1723–1750	Succeeded by Henry Hyde
Preceded by Henry Hyde	Baron Hyde; 1753	Extinct
