= James Villiers =

English actor (1933–1998)

- Villiers in The Avengers: "Small Game for Big Hunters" (1966)
- Born: James Michael Hyde Villiers; 29 September 1933; London, England
- Died: 18 January 1998 (aged 64); Arundel, Sussex, England
- Education: Royal Academy of Dramatic Art
- Occupation: Actor
- Years active: 1958–1998
- Spouses: Patricia Donovan (m. 1966; dissolved 1984) Lucy Jex (m. 1994)
- Children: 1
- Relatives: Sir Francis Hyde Villiers (grandfather); George Villiers, 4th Earl of Clarendon (great-grandfather)
- Family: Villiers

James Michael Hyde Villiers (29 September 1933 – 18 January 1998) was an English actor. He was described by The Independent as "one of the country's most distinctive character actors, with ripe articulation and a flair for displaying supercilious arrogance that put him in the Vincent Price class of screen villains".

A member of the Villiers family, he was a great-grandson of the 4th Earl of Clarendon and a grandson of Sir Francis Hyde Villiers.

== Family background ==
Villiers (pronounced Villers) was from an upper-class background, the grandson of Sir Francis Hyde Villiers and great grandson of George Villiers, 4th Earl of Clarendon; his mother was descended from Earl Talbot. His aristocratic ancestry was often reflected in casting; he performed roles such as King Charles II in the BBC series The First Churchills (1969), the Earl of Warwick in Saint Joan (1974), and on stage as Lord Thurlow in The Madness of George III.

Through his father, Villiers was a relative of Thomas Hyde Villiers, Charles Pelham Villiers, Henry Montagu Villiers and the former Secretary of State for Northern Ireland Theresa Villiers. Through his mother, he was distantly related to Charles Chetwynd-Talbot, 22nd Earl of Shrewsbury.

== Early life and education ==
Villiers was born on 29 September 1933 in London, the son of Eric Hyde Villiers and Joan Ankaret Talbot. He was brought up in Shropshire and at Ormeley Lodge, Richmond-upon-Thames, later the home of James Goldsmith. At his prep school he was considered its best actor and continued his education at Wellington College, Berkshire. Stage-struck, after leaving school he applied unsuccessfully to Colchester Repertory to be taken on in any capacity and then trained at the Royal Academy of Dramatic Art, graduating in 1953.

== Career ==
Villiers made his film début in 1958 and appeared in many British productions, including Joseph Losey's The Damned (also known as These Are the Damned), shot in 1961 but not released until 1963; Nothing but the Best (1964), Seth Holt's The Nanny (1965), Joseph Andrews (1977), For Your Eyes Only (1981), The Scarlet Pimpernel (1982), Mountains of the Moon (1990) and The Tichborne Claimant (1998), along with numerous other projects. He often specialised in portraying cold, somewhat effete villains.

Villiers portrayed the role of Colonel Hensman in the television adaptation of Brendon Chase and was heard on BBC Radio 4 as the voice of Roderick Spode in The Code of the Woosters and several other adaptations of the Jeeves stories of P. G. Wodehouse, which starred Michael Hordern and Richard Briers. In a 1965 episode of the TV series The Human Jungle, "Solo Performance", as theatre director Paul Stockhill. In the 1978 television adaptation of The Famous Five, Villiers featured strongly in the two-part pilot in which he played the antagonist, a rogue bureaucrat known only as Johnson.

== Personal life ==
In 1966, at Maidstone, Kent, Villiers married Patricia Donovan. They adopted a son, Alan Michael Hyde Villiers (born Alan Donovan), and the marriage lasted until 1984, when it was dissolved. In 1994, at Worthing, Villiers married Lucinda Jex; they were still together at the time of his death.

Nicholas Whittaker, author of Platform Souls and Blue Period, worked in the Belsize Tavern in 1979 and 1980 and claimed to recall Villiers' visits to the pub in the company of local actor Ronald Fraser. After closing time, the pair would often be found in the beer and curry restaurant opposite. Rupert Everett also claims to have encountered Villiers in an Indian restaurant, some time in 1985, "leglessly drunk, booming orders and insults to the poor long-suffering waiter in a strange breathy vibrato that was pitched for the upper circle". Elsewhere, Villiers is described as a "big drinker" who entered into drinking competitions with his friend Peter O'Toole.

=== Death ===
Villiers died on 18 January 1998 in Arundel, Sussex, of cancer.

== Selected filmography ==
- Scotland Yard ('Late Night Final' episode) (1954) (uncredited) - as Mortuary Assistant (possibly earliest TV appearance)
- Carry On Sergeant (1958) as Seventh Recruit
- Edgar Wallace Mysteries (The Clue of the New Pin) (1961) as Tab Holland
- Bomb in the High Street (1961) as Stevens
- Petticoat Pirates (1961) as English Lieutenant
- Operation Snatch (1962) as Lt. Keen
- Eva (1962) as Alan McCormick – a screenwriter
- The Damned (1963) as Captain Gregory
- Murder at the Gallop (1963) as Michael Shane
- Girl in the Headlines (1963) as David Dane
- Father Came Too! (1963) as Benzil Bulstrode*
- Hancock (1963 TV series) (1963) ('The Man on the Corner ', episode) as Captain Mainwaring
- Nothing But the Best (1964) as Hugh
- King and Country (1964) as Captain Midgely
- Repulsion (1965) as John
- Those Magnificent Men in Their Flying Machines (1965) as Yamamoto (voice, uncredited)
- The Alphabet Murders (1965) as Franklin
- You Must Be Joking! (1965) as Bill Simpson
- The Nanny (1965) as Bill Fane
- The Wrong Box (1965) as Sydney Whitcombe Sykes
- The Baron (TV series) (1966) as Roddy
- Sword of Honour BBC TV (1967) as Ian Kibannock
- Half a Sixpence (1967) as Hubert
- The Touchables (1968) as Twyning
- Some Girls Do (1969) as Carl Petersen
- Otley (1969) as Hendrickson
- A Nice Girl Like Me (1969) as Freddie
- Blood from the Mummy's Tomb (1971) as Corbeck
- The Ruling Class (1972) as Dinsdale Gurney
- Asylum (1972) as George (segment: "Lucy Comes to Stay")
- Follow Me! (1972) as Dinner Guest (uncredited)
- The Amazing Mr. Blunden (1972) as Uncle Bertie
- Ghost in the Noonday Sun (1973) as Parsley-Freck
- Seven Nights in Japan (1976) as Fin
- Spectre (1977) as Sir Geoffrey Cyon
- Joseph Andrews (1977) as Mr. Boody
- Saint Jack (1979) as Frogget
- The Music Machine (1979) as Hector Woodville (uncredited)
- For Your Eyes Only (1981) as Bill Tanner
- The Scarlet Pimpernel (1982) as Baron de Batz
- Under the Volcano (1984) as Brit
- Running Out of Luck (1987)
- Fortunes of War (1987) as Inchcape
- Scandal (1989) as Conservative M.P.
- Mountains of the Moon (1990) as Lord Oliphant
- King Ralph (1991) as Prime Minister Geoffrey Hale
- Let Him Have It (1991) as Cassels
- Uncovered (1994) as Montegrifo
- The Wind in the Willows as Magistrate (voice)
- The Willows in Winter as Magistrate (voice)
- The Tichborne Claimant (1998) as Uncle Henry
