= Maria Theresa Lewis =

British writer and biographer

Lady Maria Theresa Lewis
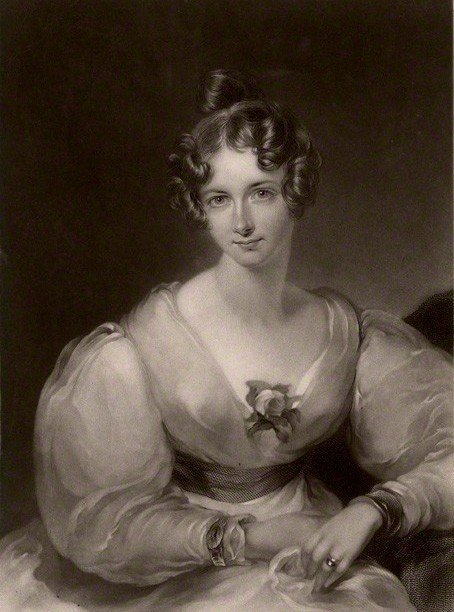
- Portrait of Maria Theresa Lewis by Gilbert Stuart Newton
- Born: 8 March 1803
- Died: 9 November 1865 (aged 62); Brasenose College
- Spouses: Thomas Henry Lister (m. 1830; died 1842); Sir George Lewis, Bt (m. 1844; died 1863)
- Children: 3 with Thomas Henry Lister: Thomas Villiers Lister; Maria Theresa Lister; Alice Beatrice Lister
- Parents: George Villiers; Theresa Parker
- Relatives: George Villiers, 4th Earl of Clarendon (brother)

Maria Theresa Lewis (born Villiers, later Lister; 8 March 1803 – 9 November 1865) was a British writer and biographer.

== Early life ==
Maria Theresa Villiers was born on 8 March 1803. She was the daughter of the Hon. George Villiers, a member of the aristocratic Villiers family (and the youngest son of Thomas Villiers, 1st Earl of Clarendon and Charlotte Capell), and the former Theresa Parker (a daughter of John Parker, 1st Baron Boringdon and his second wife Hon. Theresa Robinson).

Among her siblings were George Villiers, 4th Earl of Clarendon, Thomas Hyde Villiers, Hon. Charles Pelham Villiers, Frederick Adolphus Villiers, Hon. Edward Ernest Villiers (who married Elizabeth Charlotte Liddell, daughter of Thomas Liddell, 1st Baron Ravensworth), Hon. Henry Montagu Villiers (Bishop of Durham), and Lt. Hon. Augustus Algernon Villiers.

== Career ==
Lewis compiled the biography of one of her ancestors, Edward Hyde, 1st Earl of Clarendon. In 1852 Lewis published her first work which was a group of biographies based on the people known to Edward Hyde, the Earl of Clarendon, and it was titled The Lives of the Friends and Contemporaries of Lord Chancellor Clarendon. The book was intended to illustrate the portraits in Clarendon's gallery at The Grove, Watford.

Lewis's work so impressed the writer Mary Berry that she left her papers to Lewis (via Sir Thomas Frankland Lewis) so that Lewis could in 1865 publish Extracts of the Journals and Correspondence of Miss Berry from the year 1783 to 1852.

Lady Lewis also edited a novel by the Hon. Emily Eden called The Semi-Detached House in 1859, and she wrote two plays, based on fairy tales, for children to perform.

== Personal life ==
On 6 November 1830, at St. George’s Church, Hanover-square, she married the novelist and biographer Thomas Henry Lister, a son of Thomas Lister of Armitage Park, and his first wife Harriet Anne Seale. In 1836 Lister was appointed Registrar General in the British civil service. They had three children:

- Thomas Villiers Lister (1832–1902), married first Fanny Harriet Coryton and secondly Florence Selina Hamilton, daughter of geologist William Hamilton and his second wife Margaret Frances Florence Dillon.
- Maria Theresa Lister (d. 1863) married the politician William Vernon Harcourt, by whom she had a son, Lewis Harcourt, 1st Viscount Harcourt.
- Alice Beatrice Lister (d. 1898) married Algernon Borthwick, 1st Baron Glenesk, owner of the London newspaper the Morning Post, by whom she had a daughter, Lilian Margaret Frances Borthwick, who married Seymour Bathurst, 7th Earl Bathurst.

Her husband died in 1842.

=== Second marriage ===
In 1844 she remarried, to Sir George Cornewall Lewis, 2nd Baronet. Lewis's career was promoted by his wife in London society and by her family.

Two years after the death of Sir George, Lady Lewis died from cancer in 1865 at Brasenose College, Oxford when paying a visit to the Principal. She was initially buried on 14 November 1865 in Holywell Cemetery, Oxford, but the parish register of St Mary-the-Virgin Church records that “her remains were subsequently removed by the family”. She was eventually laid to rest beside her second husband (as she had wished) in St Stephen's Church, Old Radnor and her family erected a memorial to her on the wall of that church.
