= Thomas Villiers Lister =

British diplomat

Sir Thomas Villiers Lister KCMG DL
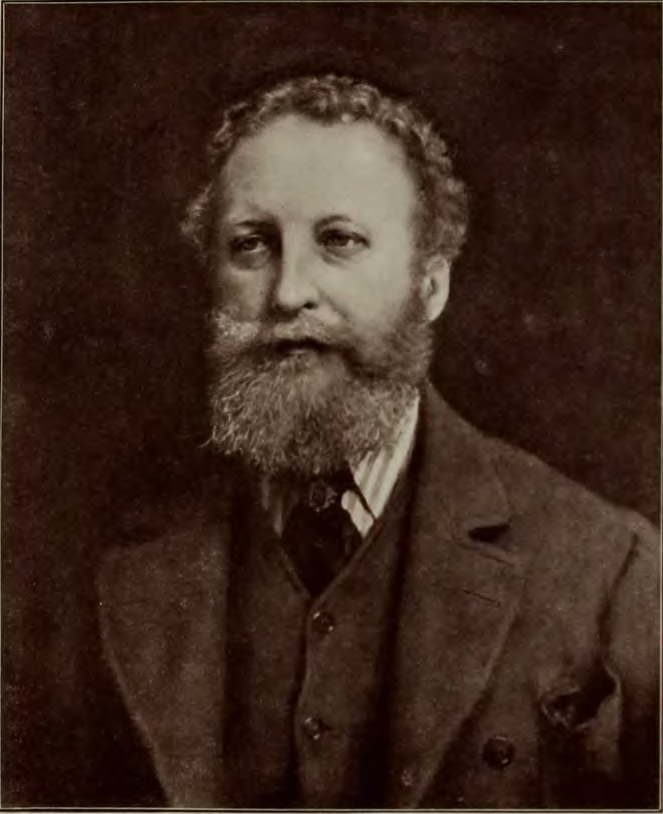
- Born: 7 May 1832
- Died: 26 February 1902 (aged 69)
- Occupation: Diplomat
- Spouses: Fanny Harriet Coryton (m. 1862; died 1875); Florence Selina Hamilton (m. 1877)
- Children: 12; 7 with Fanny Harriet Coryton: Katherine Lister; Constance Mary Lister; George Coryton Lister; Maria Theresa Lister; Leonard Coryton Lister; Edmund Algernon Coryton Lister; Harry Coryton Lister; 5 with Florence Selina Hamilton: Mary Florence Lister; Christine Sibyl Lister; Margaret Evelyn Lister; Frederick Hamilton Lister; Algernon Hamilton Lister
- Parents: Thomas Henry Lister (father); Lady Maria Theresa Villiers (mother)
- Relatives: George Villiers (grandfather)

Sir Thomas Villiers Lister KCMG DL (7 May 1832 – 26 February 1902) from the Villiers family was a British diplomat and the Assistant Under-Secretary of State for Foreign Affairs, 1873-94.

== Early life ==
Thomas Villiers Lister was the son of Thomas Henry Lister, Armitage Park, Staffordshire and Lady Maria Theresa Villiers.

Lister was educated at Harrow (Matric. Michs. 1850) and was admitted pensioner at Trinity College, Cambridge, on 19 October 1849. He graduated M.A. in 1853.

== Career ==
Lister entered the Foreign Office in 1853 and became Private Secretary to the Earl of Clarendon and précis writer to Lord John Russell. 1n 1853 he was attached to Lord John Russell's mission to Vienna. Two years later he was attached to the Earl of Clarendon's mission to Paris, and in 1861 to Earl Granville's special embassy to Prussia. From 1873 to 1894 he was the Assistant Under-Secretary of State for Foreign Affairs.

== Honours ==
- 1856 Deputy Lieutenant (DL) of Radnorshire
- 1885 Knight Commander of the Order of St Michael and St George (KCMG)

== Personal life ==
In 1862, Lister married Fanny Harriet Coryton, daughter of William Coryton of Pentillie Castle, Cornwall, and Harriet Sophia Parker (later Dowager Countess of Morley). They had seven children:

- Katherine Lister
- Constance Mary Lister
- George Coryton Lister
- Maria Theresa Lister
- Leonard Coryton Lister
- Edmund Algernon Coryton Lister
- Harry Coryton Lister

Fanny died in 1875. A memorial window was placed in the church of St. Mary, Plympton, Devon, by Fanny's mother and half-brother, Albert Edmund Parker.

In 1877 Lister married his second wife Florence Selina Hamilton, daughter of William John Hamilton and Hon. Margaret Frances Florence Dillon. They had five children:

- Mary Florence Lister
- Christine Sibyl Lister
- Margaret Evelyn Lister
- Frederick Hamilton Lister
- Algernon Hamilton Lister
