= Theresa Villiers =

British Conservative politician (born 1968)

The Right Honourable Dame Theresa Villiers DBE
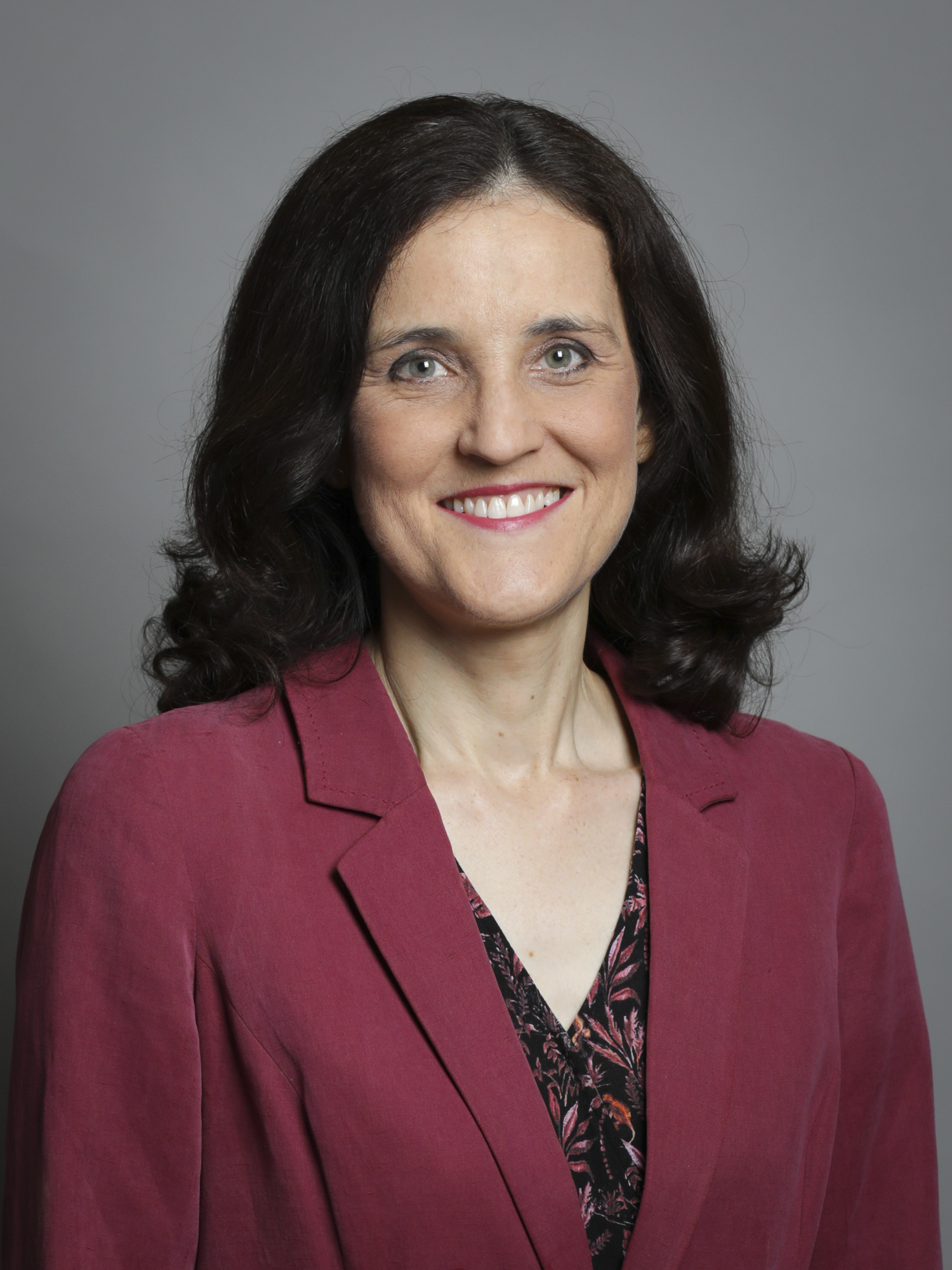
- Official portrait, 2020

Secretary of State for Environment, Food and Rural Affairs
- In office 24 July 2019 – 13 February 2020
- Prime Minister: Boris Johnson
- Preceded by: Michael Gove
- Succeeded by: George Eustice

Secretary of State for Northern Ireland
- In office 4 September 2012 – 14 July 2016
- Prime Minister: David Cameron
- Preceded by: Owen Paterson
- Succeeded by: James Brokenshire

Minister of State for Rail and Aviation
- In office 13 May 2010 – 4 September 2012
- Prime Minister: David Cameron
- Preceded by: Sadiq Khan
- Succeeded by: Simon Burns
Shadow cabinet positions
Shadow Secretary of State for Transport
In office 2 July 2007 – 11 May 2010
Leader	David Cameron
Preceded by	Chris Grayling
Succeeded by	Sadiq Khan
Shadow Chief Secretary to the Treasury
In office 6 December 2005 – 2 July 2007
Leader	David Cameron
Preceded by	Philip Hammond
Succeeded by	Philip Hammond

Member of Parliament for Chipping Barnet
- In office 5 May 2005 – 30 May 2024
- Preceded by: Sydney Chapman
- Succeeded by: Dan Tomlinson

Member of the European Parliament
- In office 15 July 1999 – 5 May 2005
- Preceded by: Constituency established
- Succeeded by: Syed Kamall
- Constituency: London

Personal details
- Born: Theresa Anne Villiers; 5 March 1968 (age 58) Hunstanton, Norfolk, England
- Party: Conservative
- Spouse: Sid Wilken (m. 1997; div. 2006)
- Relatives: Villiers family
- Education: University of Bristol; Jesus College, Oxford; City Law School
- Website: Official website

Dame Theresa Anne Villiers (born 5 March 1968) is a British politician who served as the Member of Parliament (MP) for Chipping Barnet from 2005 to 2024, having previously served as a Member of the European Parliament from 1999 to 2005. A member of the Conservative Party, Villiers was Minister of State for Rail and Aviation from 2010 to 2012, Secretary of State for Northern Ireland from 2012 to 2016 and Secretary of State for Environment, Food and Rural Affairs from 2019 to 2020.

== Early life ==
Villiers was born in Hunstanton, Norfolk, in 1968, the third child of George Edward Villiers by his marriage to Anne Virginia Threlfall; she has two elder brothers, Edward and Henry. On her father's side, she is a descendant of Edward Ernest Villiers (1806–1843), brother of George Villiers, 4th Earl of Clarendon, Thomas Hyde Villiers, Charles Pelham Villiers, and Henry Montagu Villiers, and a direct descendant of King Edward II.

Growing up in North London, she was educated at the independent Francis Holland School. Villiers gained a Bachelor of Laws (LLB) degree with first-class honours in 1990 from the University of Bristol, and a year later the postgraduate degree of Bachelor of Civil Law (BCL) from Jesus College, Oxford. After university, she qualified for the bar at the Inner Temple, and worked as a lecturer at King's College London from 1994 until 1999.

== Member of the European Parliament ==
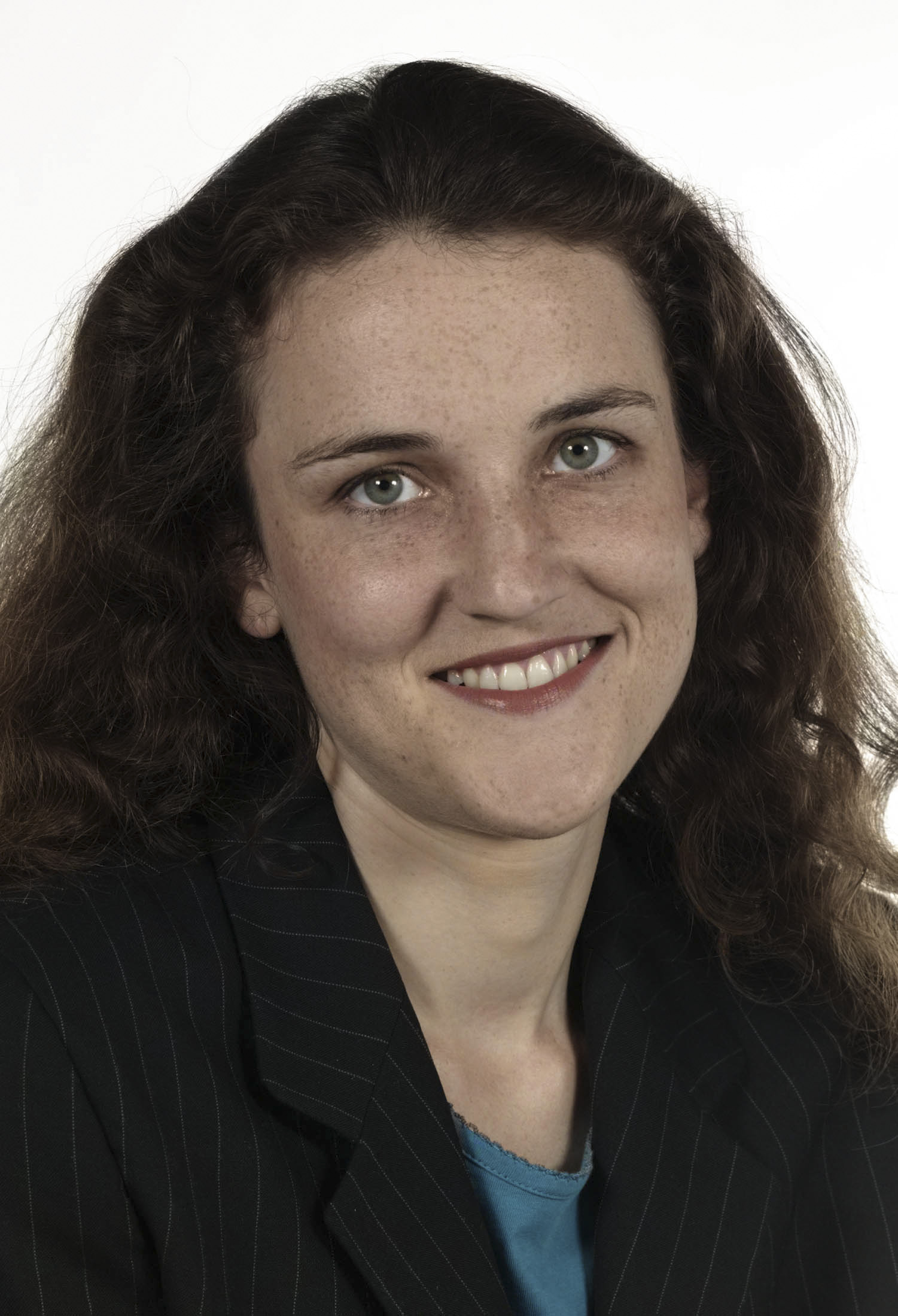
Villiers's 1999 portrait as an MEP

Villiers was elected as a Member of the European Parliament (MEP) for the London constituency in 1999, and was re-elected in 2004. She stood down following the 2005 general election when she was elected as the Member of Parliament (MP) for Chipping Barnet.

She served as Deputy Leader of the Conservatives in the European Parliament between 2001 and 2002. She also served as a member of the governing board of the Conservative Party during this period.

== Member of Parliament ==
In 2003, following Sir Sydney Chapman's announcement that he would retire at the following election, Villiers was selected as the Conservative prospective parliamentary candidate for Chipping Barnet. Although Chapman's majority at the 2001 general election had only been 2,701 votes, the party viewed Chipping Barnet to be quite a "safe" Conservative seat, and Villiers held it at the 2005 general election with an increased majority of 5,960 votes, which she increased again to 11,927 in 2010. Her majority dropped to 7,656 in 2015, and was reduced to just 353 in 2017. However, Villiers's majority rose to 1,212 in the 2019 general election, despite her percentage share of the vote going down slightly.

Upon her election to the House of Commons in 2005, she resigned from her seat in the European Parliament; it went to Syed Kamall, the next candidate on the Conservatives' regional list for London. Villiers now lives at Arkley in her constituency.

Villiers was sworn of the Privy Council on 9 June 2010.

In July 2021, Villiers was one of five Conservative MPs found by the Commons Select Committee on Standards to have breached the code of conduct by trying to influence a judge in the trial of former Conservative MP Charlie Elphicke, who was eventually found guilty of three counts of sexual assault and sentenced to two years in prison. Villiers was one of three of the group recommended for a one-day suspension by the committee.

Villiers lost her seat in the 2024 general election. The Chipping Barnet constituency, with adjusted boundaries, was gained by the Labour Party and incoming MP Dan Tomlinson.

=== Shadow Cabinet ===
In December 2005, following the election of David Cameron as Conservative Party Leader, Villiers was promoted to the Shadow Cabinet, as Shadow Chief Secretary to the Treasury. In July 2007, Cameron promoted her to Shadow Secretary of State for Transport.

=== Government ===
Following the 2010 general election, the Conservatives, short of an overall majority, formed a coalition government with the Liberal Democrats. This required positions in Cabinet to be awarded to Lib Dem MPs, so Villiers did not become Secretary of State for Transport as might have been expected in the event of a majority Conservative government taking office. That role went instead to Philip Hammond, who had shadowed the post of Chief Secretary to the Treasury. Villiers instead became a Minister of State at the Department for Transport.

Villiers was appointed Secretary of State for Northern Ireland in September 2012. Her time in Northern Ireland gained mixed reviews. She made a speech in February 2016 defending the Royal Ulster Constabulary and the British Army, which had been accused of colluding with loyalist murderers in the Loughinisland massacre. The Police Ombudsman who investigated the murders, Michael Maguire, later stated with regard to law enforcement authorities colluding with the murderers: "I have no hesitation in unambiguously determining that collusion is a significant feature of the Loughinisland murders".

Villiers had said that "a pernicious counter-narrative" of the Troubles was emerging whereby responsibility for acts of terrorism was being shifted onto the security forces "through allegations of collusion, misuse of agents and informers or other forms of unlawful activity".

Villiers was one of the six cabinet ministers who came out in support of Brexit during the 2016 United Kingdom European Union membership referendum. As the Secretary of State for Northern Ireland at the time, she was pressed to explain her view of the problems her position could cause the province. In April 2016, she gave a speech saying those raising concerns about Brexit's impact on Northern Ireland were "scaremongering". Following the referendum, on 14 July 2016, Villiers resigned from her position as Northern Ireland Secretary after stating that new Prime Minister Theresa May had offered her a post in the Cabinet which was "not one which I felt I could take on". During the referendum, 62.2% of voters in her constituency (based on a 72.1% turnout), voted to remain in the European Union. Following the referendum, Villiers continued to support leaving the EU.

Villiers was appointed Secretary of State for Environment, Food and Rural Affairs by Boris Johnson upon him becoming prime minister in July 2019. She left the government in the post-Brexit cabinet reshuffle.

In June 2020 The Times newspaper reported that the delay in the formation of the Intelligence and Security Committee of Parliament since the 2019 general election had been due to Villiers appointment having been dismissed by the Prime Minister for her defiance of the Government's whip on a vote where she supported an amendment which would have banned the import of chlorinated chicken products from the US in upcoming post-Brexit trade negotiations.

=== Parliamentary expenses and second home ===
As an MP, Villiers maintained a second home in Arkley, in her former North London constituency of Chipping Barnet. The house, a semi-detached property was purchased for £296,500 in May 2004, (an eight-minute drive away from High Barnet tube station), where commuters can reach Westminster in an average of forty-five minutes. In 2008, her additional residence became a flat in Kennington.

=== Political opinions ===
Villiers supported the temporary suspension of Ken Livingstone, then-Mayor of London, by the Adjudication Panel for England, which examined the case after a complaint from the Board of Deputies of British Jews to the Standards Board for England.

Theresa Villiers is a member, and since 2017 vice-chair, of Conservative Friends of Israel.

On 19 July 2018 she was the only MP of any party to attend a rally of about 200–300 Jewish and other persons called by the "Campaign Against Antisemitism" (CAA) in Parliament Square, London, to protest against Jeremy Corbyn and the Labour Party. She has, on previous occasions, attended CAA protests similar to that of 19 July 2018 against anti-semitism within Labour.

Together with Matthew Offord, she spoke out publicly in support of Iranian resistance to the Iranian regime at an event in Paris in 2017, organised by the National Council of Resistance of Iran. They protested against human right abuses and executions in Iran.

Since September 2008, Villiers has dedicated a considerable proportion of her public announcements to aviation policy, specifically the expansion of airports in the South East of England. Villiers underlined that despite differences of opinion, the Coalition government's policy was opposed to a third runway at Heathrow airport.

She has also spoken out against Boris Johnson's favoured proposal for a new London airport to be built in the Thames Estuary, and alternative expansions at Gatwick and Stansted airports, arguing that airlines should make greater use of the UK's regional airports, though some regional airports themselves have expressed concern about being adversely affected by capacity shortages in the South East. Villiers favours construction of a high-speed rail link from London to Birmingham and Manchester, arguing that flyers could use spare capacity at airports such as Birmingham International and Manchester International Airport.

In May 2017, Villiers announced that she fundamentally supports the ban on hunting of wild animals with dogs but suggested that there remains scope for reform of the Hunting Act 2004.

In September 2019 at that year's Conservative Party Conference, Villiers set out plans to end live exports of farm animals, ban primates from being kept as pets and for cats to be microchipped.

In 2022, Villiers spearheaded opposition to Prime Minister Rishi Sunak's plan to set housebuilding targets for councils to alleviate the housing shortage in the United Kingdom. In a 2023 interview, Villers said that denser housing, such as the apartment buildings proposed to be built near the Cockfosters station on the Piccadilly line would turn the London suburbs into "East Berlin." She argued that dense housing construction would not be "positive for the environment or for social cohesion." Critics have called her the "nimby queen" of British politics, to which she responded that the term NIMBY is "term of abuse rather than engaging in a debate about how we deliver the homes we need in a sustainable way".

== Post-parliamentary career ==
Following her defeat at the 2024 General Election, the former MP was appointed as an adviser to public affairs consultancy 9thFloorUK Consultants. In August 2026, Villiers issued a statement, confirming that she would not contest her former seat in Chipping Barnet (or in any other parliamentary constituency) at the next general election. She is returning to an academic career of teaching and research at University College London.

== Controversies ==
In August 2023 it was revealed that Villiers had failed to declare she held shares worth over £70,000 in the oil and gas company Shell whilst serving as Secretary of State for Environment, Food and Rural Affairs.

== Personal life ==
Villiers married fellow barrister Sean Wilken KC in 1997, and the following year they co-wrote a book on matters of contract and quasi-contract law, which was published by a major publishing house. They divorced in 2006. On 11 April 2025, Villiers was appointed a Dame Commander of the Order of the British Empire in Rishi Sunak's Resignation Honours List.

== Honours ==
2025: Dame Commander of the Most Excellent Order of the British Empire.

== Publications ==
- Theresa Villiers & Sean Wilken (29 April 1998). Law of Estoppel, Variation and Waiver. John Wiley & Sons. ISBN 0-471-96921-4.

European Parliament
New constituency	Member of the European Parliament for London; 1999–2005	Succeeded by Syed Kamall
Parliament of the United Kingdom
Preceded by Sydney Chapman	Member of Parliament for Chipping Barnet; 2005–2024	Succeeded by Dan Tomlinson
Political offices
Preceded by Philip Hammond	Shadow Chief Secretary to the Treasury; 2005–2007	Succeeded by Philip Hammond
Preceded by Chris Grayling	Shadow Secretary of State for Transport; 2007–2010	Succeeded by The Lord Adonis
Preceded by Sadiq Khan	Minister of State for Transport; 2010–2012	Succeeded by Simon Burns
Preceded by Owen Paterson	Secretary of State for Northern Ireland; 2012–2016	Succeeded by James Brokenshire
Preceded by Michael Gove	Secretary of State for Environment, Food and Rural Affairs; 2019–2020	Succeeded by George Eustice
