= Charles Baring =

British bishop (1807–1879)

- Bishop of Durham
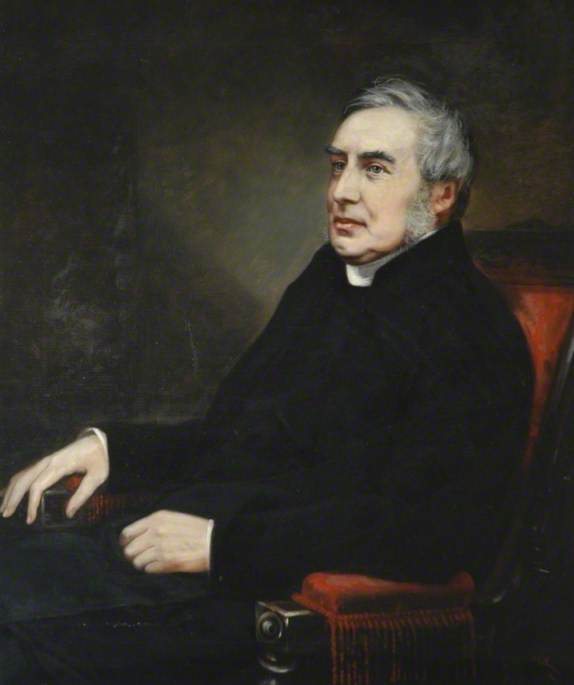
- Portrait of Baring
- Diocese: Diocese of Durham
- In office: 1861–1879
- Predecessor: Henry Montagu Villiers
- Successor: Joseph Lightfoot
- Other post: Bishop of Gloucester and Bristol (1856–1861)

Orders
- Ordination: 1830 (deacon); 1831 (priest)
- Consecration: c. 1856

Personal details
- Born: 11 January 1807
- Died: 14 September 1879 (aged 72) Wimbledon, Surrey, United Kingdom
- Denomination: Anglican
- Parents: Thomas & Mary
- Spouse: 1. Mary (m. 1830); 2. Caroline (m. 1846)
- Children: inc. Thomas & Francis
- Occupation: Preacher
- Education: Christ Church, Oxford

Charles Thomas Baring (11 January 1807 – 14 September 1879) was an English bishop, noted as an Evangelical.

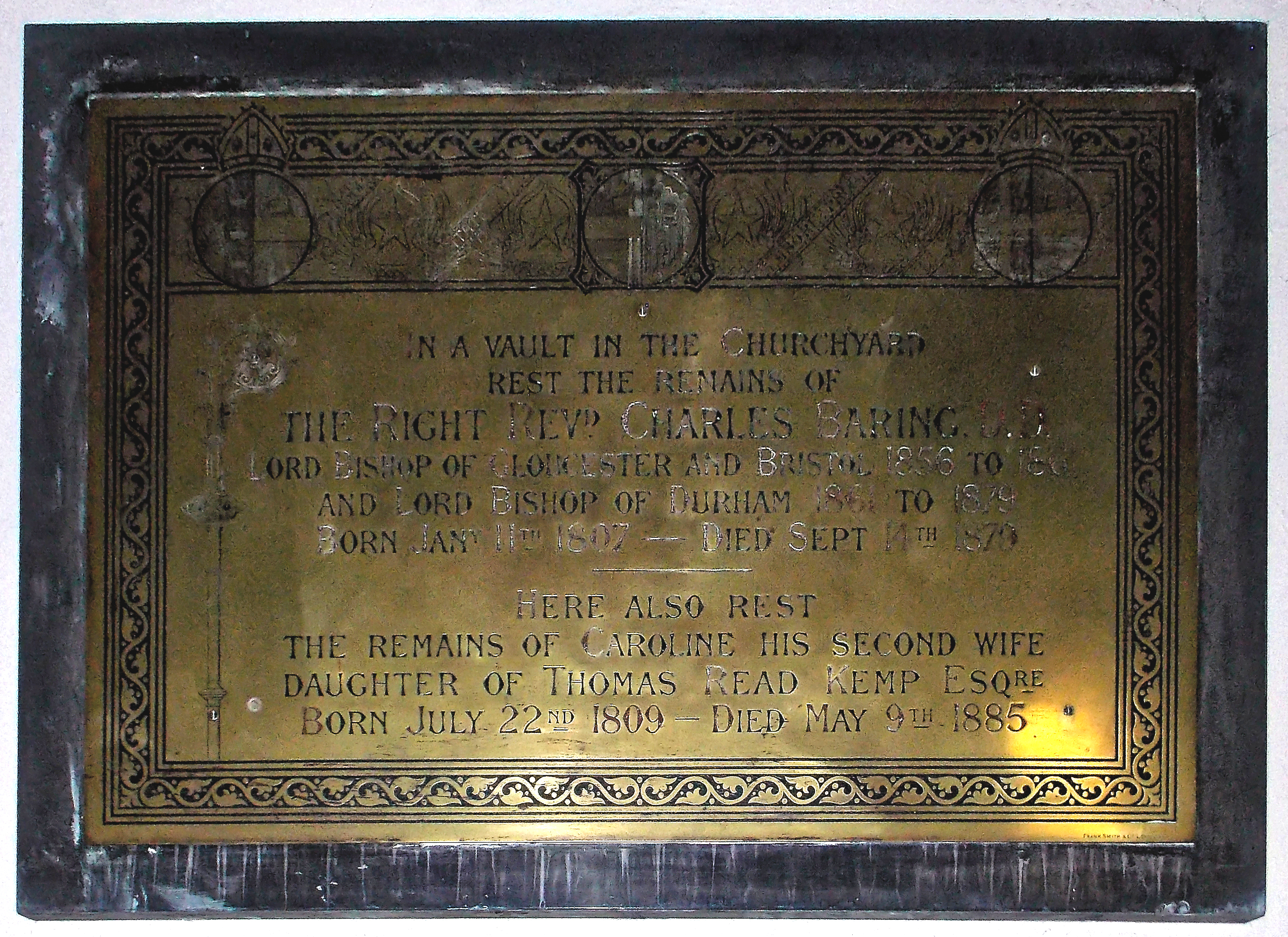
Brass plaque memorial to Charles Baring in Holy Innocents Church, High Beach, Essex, the place where he is interred

== Early life, family and education ==
Baring was born into the Baring banking family on 11 January 1807, the fourth son of Sir Thomas Baring, 2nd Baronet, and Mary née Sealy. Having been educated privately as a child, he read classics and mathematics at Christ Church, Oxford, before ordination, and was President of the Oxford Union. He first married Mary Sealy (who died in 1840) in 1830; they had at least one child – Tory politician Thomas Charles Baring was their son. He later remarried in 1846, his cousin Caroline Kemp, with whom he had further children – their son Francis became a priest. Caroline survived Charles.

== Career ==
Ordained a deacon on 6 June 1830 and a priest on 29 May 1831 by Richard Bagot, Bishop of Oxford, Baring began his ecclesiastical career at St Ebbe's, Oxford and Kings Worthy before taking the benefice of All Souls', Marylebone, in 1847. He moved to Limpsfield in 1855, but was soon elected Bishop of Gloucester and Bristol. He became a bishop at a period when Lord Palmerston, influenced by Anthony Ashley-Cooper, 7th Earl of Shaftesbury, was promoting Evangelicals.

He translated to the see of Durham in 1861, where as Bishop of Durham he came into conflict with High Church clergy, for example suspending Francis Grey, rector of Morpeth, as Rural Dean, for wearing a stole of which he disapproved. He resigned due to ill health on 2 February 1879 and died in Wimbledon on 14 September, and was interred at Holy Innocents Church at High Beach, Essex.

== Styles and titles ==
- 6 June 1830 – 1856: The Reverend Charles Baring
- 1856 – 14 September 1879: The Right Reverend Charles Baring

== Sources ==
- Mandell Creighton, ‘Baring, Charles Thomas (1807–1879)’, rev. H. C. G. Matthew, Oxford Dictionary of National Biography, Oxford University Press, 2004

Church of England titles
Preceded by James Henry Monk	Bishop of Gloucester and Bristol; 1856–1861	Succeeded by William Thomson
Preceded by Henry Montagu Villiers	Bishop of Durham; 1861–1879	Succeeded by Joseph Lightfoot
