= Thomas Hyde Villiers =

British politician

Thomas Hyde Villiers (24 January 1801 – 3 December 1832) was a British politician from the Villiers family.

He was the second son of The Hon. George Villiers (third son of Thomas Villiers, 1st Earl of Clarendon). He served in the Colonial Office from 1822 to 1825, and was agent for Berbice and Newfoundland.

He was Member of Parliament for Hedon from 1826 to 1830, for Wootton Bassett in 1830, and for Bletchingley from 1831 to 1832. He held office as Secretary to the Board of Control from 1831 until 1832.

== Early life ==
He was the second son of George Villiers (1759–1827), who married, on 17 April 1798, Theresa, only daughter of John Parker, 1st Baron Boringdon. George William Frederick Villiers, 4th Earl of Clarendon, was their eldest son, Charles Pelham Villiers their third son, and Henry Montagu Villiers their fifth son.

Villiers was educated at home and, with his eldest brother, at St. John's College, Cambridge, at which he knew Charles Austin, Edward Strutt, John Romilly, and Thomas Babington Macaulay, who were influenced by Jeremy Bentham. In 1822 he graduated B.A., and in 1825 he proceeded M.A.

After his graduation he entered the Colonial Office, at which Sir Henry Taylor became early in 1824 his subordinate. From 1825 Villiers and Taylor shared a house in Suffolk Street.

== Politician ==
Villiers joined in 1825 a debating club called "The Academics", where several of his college friends and John Stuart Mill discussed political and economic topic. One of his speeches to the club, about colonisation, attracted the attention of the Chancellor of the Exchequer.

At the general election in June 1826 Villiers was returned to Parliament for the borough of Hedon in Yorkshire, for which he sat until the dissolution of Parliament in 1830. In 1830 and 1831 he sat respectively for Wootton Bassett (a family borough) and Bletchingley, and voted for the Reform Bill.

Between 1825 and 1828, Villiers and Sir Robert Wilmot-Horton wrote, under the pseudonym 'Vindex', articles to The Star newspaper, in which they refuted the objections that others had made to the analysis of slavery made by West Indies expert Thomas Moody ADC Kt., the Parliamentary Commissioner on West Indian Slavery, and defended the character of Moody.

Villiers in 1828 travelled in Ireland, which he described in letters to Taylor. A letter written by him in February 1829 was shown to Richard Lalor Sheil, who then brought about the suppression of the Catholic Association. Villiers suggested in 1831 the formation of the commission that laid the foundation of the new poor law.

On 18 May 1831 he became Secretary to the Board of Control under Charles Grant. Later in the year, on 2 November 1831, Villiers and Taylor entered as students at Lincoln's Inn. On 22 August 1831 he made a long speech in the House of Commons on the Methuen treaty with Portugal. The committees on India were organised by Villiers, with the assistance of Lord Althorp, and he worked on the renewal of the charter of the East India Company.

== Family ==
Villiers and Charlotte Harte had two children: The Rev. Charles Lawrence Villiers (1830 – 15 October 1893), Rector of Croft Parish in Yorkshire, and Gertrude Villiers (1 August 1834 – 2 July 1896), who in 1853 married The Rev. William Frederick Bickmore.

His granddaughter was Gertrude Mary Amelia Villiers (1861 – 30 Aug 1949) who in 1896 married The Hon. Robert Grimston (18 April 1860 – 8 July 1927).

== Death ==
At the time of his death Villiers was a candidate for the constituency of Penryn and Falmouth in Cornwall. After three months of suffering from an abscess in the head, he died on 3 December 1832 at Carclew, the seat of Sir Charles Lemon, near Penryn, where he was staying. A monument was placed to his memory in Mylor church.

Parliament of the United Kingdom
Preceded by Robert Farrand; John Baillie	Member of Parliament for Hedon; 1826–1830; With: John Baillie	Succeeded by Robert Farrand; Sir Thomas Clifford-Constable, Bt
Preceded by Sir George Philips, Bt; Horace Twiss	Member of Parliament for Wootton Bassett; 1830–1831; With: Viscount Mahon	Succeeded by Lord Porchester; Viscount Mahon
Preceded by Charles Tennyson; Hon. John Ponsonby	Member of Parliament for Bletchingley; 1831–1832; With: The Viscount Palmerston	Constituency abolished
Political offices
Preceded by Viscount Sandon	Secretary to the Board of Control; 1831–1832	Succeeded by Thomas Babington Macaulay
