= Villiers family =

English aristocratic family

Villiers
- Noble family
- Country: England, Wales
- Founded: 1235; 791 years ago
- Current head: William Child Villiers, 10th Earl of Jersey
- Seat: Radier Manor
- Titles: Duke of Buckingham; Duke of Cleveland; Earl of Anglesey; Earl of Jersey; Earl of Clarendon
- Connected families: Spencer family; House of Stuart; Washington family

Villiers (/ˈvɪlərz/ VIL-ərz) is an aristocratic family in the United Kingdom. Over time, various members of the Villiers family were made knights, baronets, and peers. Peerages held by the Villiers family include the dukedoms of Buckingham (1623–1687) and Cleveland (1670–1709), as well as the earldoms of Anglesey (1623–1661), Jersey (since 1697), and Clarendon (since 1776). Perhaps the most prominent members of the family were those who received the two dukedoms: George Villiers, 1st Duke of Buckingham (1592–1628) rose to fame and influence as favourite of King James I of England, while Barbara Villiers, Duchess of Cleveland (1640–1709) became a mistress of King Charles II of England, by whom she had five children.

Elizabeth Villiers was the reputed mistress of William III, King of England and Scotland and Frances Villiers, Countess of Jersey, wife of George Villiers, 4th Earl of Jersey, was Lady of the Bedchamber to Caroline of Brunswick and a mistress of King George IV when he was Prince of Wales.

== History ==
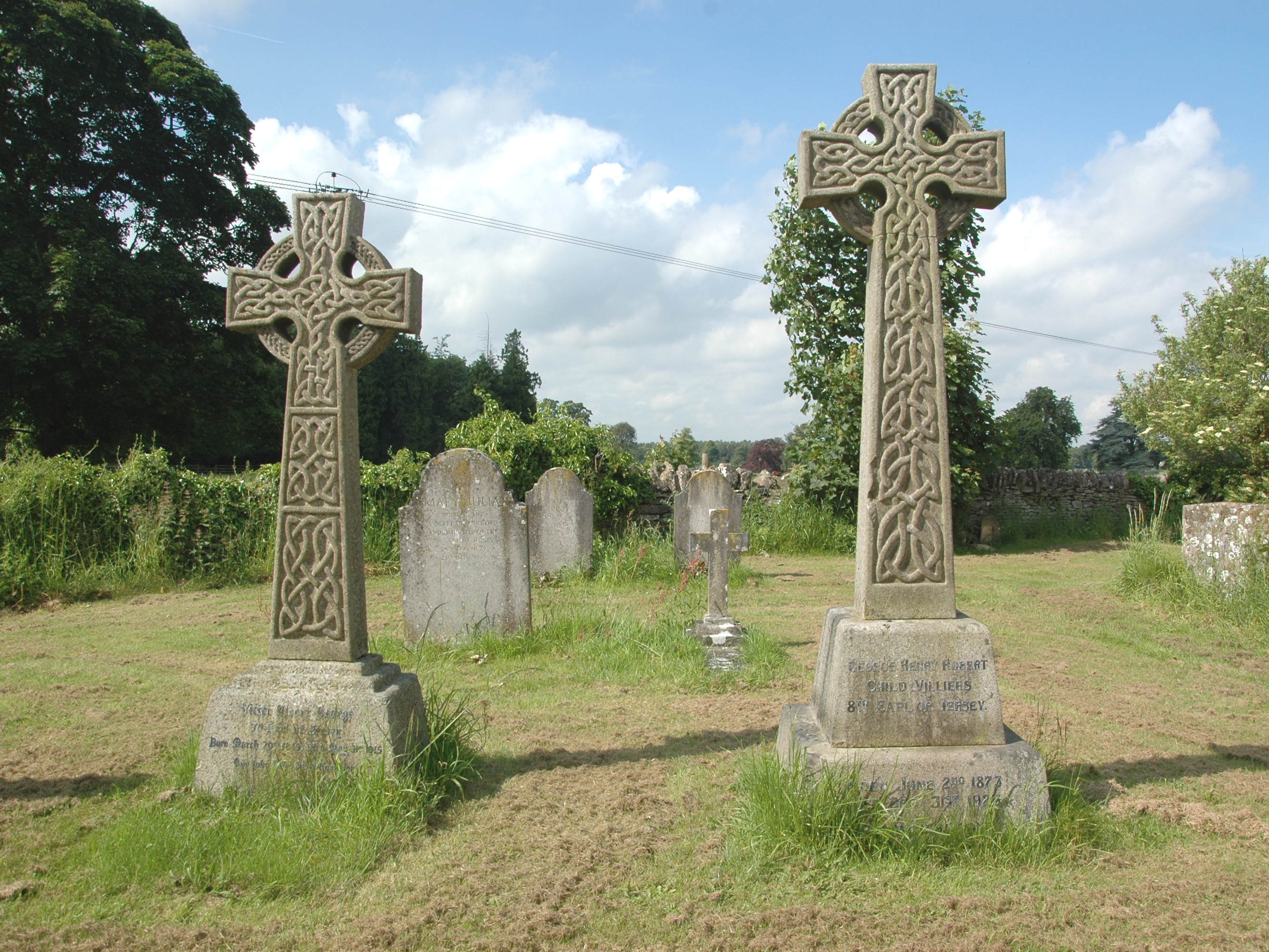
Graves of the 7th (left) and 8th (right) Earls of Jersey in All Saints' parish churchyard, Middleton Stoney, Oxfordshire

=== Descent ===
The Villiers family were settled at Brooksby, Leicestershire, from at least 1235. In the early 13th century, the tenant of Brooksby, Gilbert de Seis, married a member of the Villiers family, a line of minor gentry of Norman descent. The estate remained in Villiers hands for the next 500 years. At this time Brooksby consisted of the hall, the nearby Church of St Michael and All Angels, Brooksby, a small number of peasants' houses and a field system with common land.

In the 16th century, the family was represented by George Villiers († 1606), a minor gentleman who is said to have been a "prosperous sheep farmer". He was High Sheriff of Leicestershire in 1591, and a Knight of the shire for the county from 1604 until his death. He was knighted in 1593.

Sir George Villiers was married twice, and left nine surviving children. Among the children from his first marriage were the eldest son, Sir William Villiers, 1st Baronet († 1629), who became the ancestor of the Villiers baronets; Edward († 1626), who became Master of the Mint and President of Munster; a daughter who married into the Boteler family; and another who married into the Washington family. Among the children from Sir George Villiers's second marriage to Mary (née Beaumont, † 1632) were George († 1628), the favourite of King James I of England who was eventually created Duke of Buckingham, and his sister Susan († 1652), who married the 1st Earl of Denbigh. According to Thomson, Sir George Villiers is an ancestor of sixteen British prime ministers, from the 3rd Duke of Grafton to David Cameron.

=== Rise to wealth and influence ===
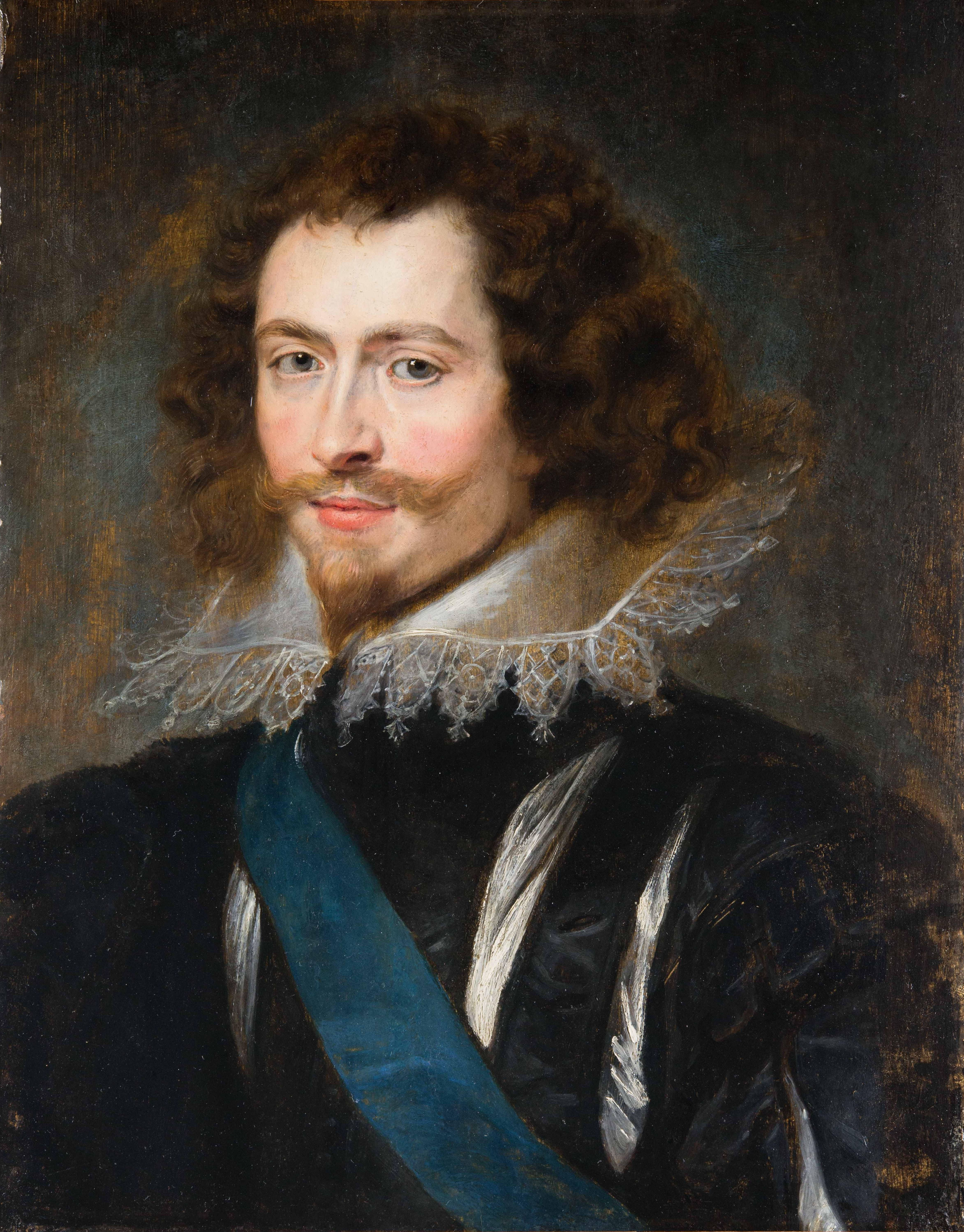
George Villiers, 1st Duke of Buckingham, the favourite, and possibly lover, of King James VI and I.

In August 1614, the then twenty-one-year-old George Villiers became the favourite of King James I of England, and remained in this position until the king's death in 1625. Under James's patronage, Villers advanced rapidly through the ranks of the nobility. In 1615 he was knighted as a Gentleman of the Bedchamber, and in 1616 elevated to the peerage as Baron Whaddon and Viscount Villiers. He was made Earl of Buckingham in 1617, then Marquess of Buckingham in 1618, and eventually Earl of Coventry and Duke of Buckingham in 1623. Buckingham was the king's constant companion and closest advisor. Even after James I's death, Buckingham remained at the height of royal favour under Charles I, until he was assassinated in 1628. Buckingham was buried in Westminster Abbey, while his titles passed to his son George (1628–1687), upon whose death they became extinct.

=== Continuing influence ===
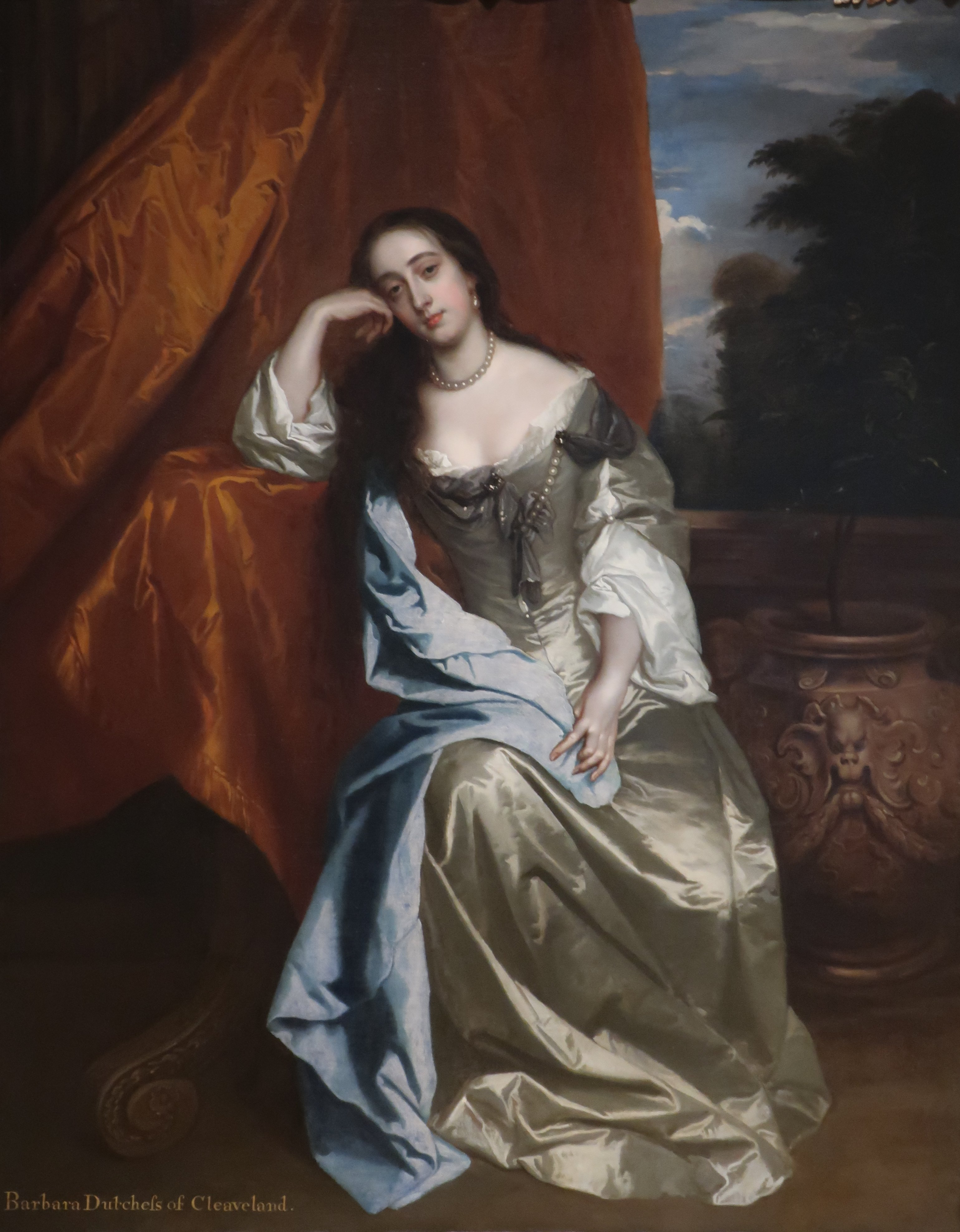
Barbara Villiers, Duchess of Cleveland (1640–1709), a mistress of King Charles II of England, by Sir Peter Lely

As a royal favourite during the reigns of James I and Charles I, Buckingham used his enormous political influence to prodigiously enrich his relatives and advance their social positions, which soured public opinion towards him. Under his influence, several members of his immediate family were made knights, baronets and peers. His half-brother Edward († 1626) was knighted in 1616, while his mother was created Countess of Buckingham in her own right in 1618 and his eldest half-brother William († 1629) was created a baronet in 1619. Two of Buckingham's other brothers were similarly honoured when John († 1658) was created Baron Villiers of Stoke and Viscount Purbeck in 1619, and Christopher († 1630) was created Baron Villiers of Daventry and Earl of Anglesey in 1623.

Sir Edward Villiers († 1626) married Barbara St John, daughter of Sir John St John († 1594) of Lydiard Tregoze, Wiltshire, by whom he had ten children. Villiers's wife was the niece of Oliver St John, who was created Viscount Grandison in 1623. Grandison had no issue, so the Duke of Buckingham arranged for his half-brother's sons to inherit that title. Sir Edward Villiers's eldest son, William († 1643), thus succeeded as second Viscount Grandison in 1630. He was the father of Barbara Villiers († 1709), one of the mistresses of King Charles II, by whom she had five children, and who was created Duchess of Cleveland in 1670.

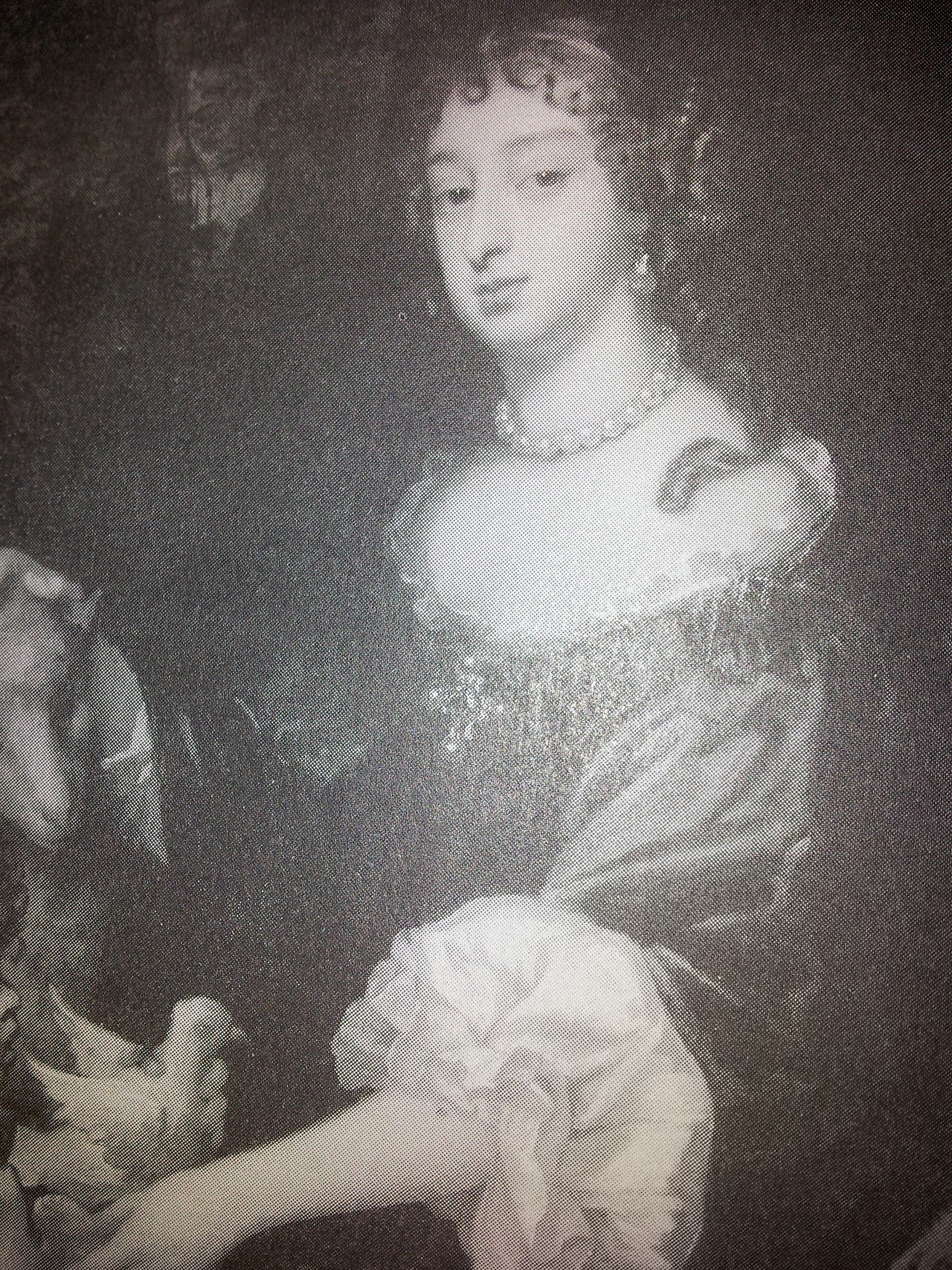
Elizabeth Villiers, mistress to King William III of England 1680-1695

Sir Edward Villiers's second and third sons, John († c.1661) and George († 1699), succeeded as 3rd and 4th Viscounts Grandison, while the fourth son, Sir Edward Villiers († 1689), was father of Edward Villiers († 1711), who was created both Baron Villiers and Viscount Villiers in 1691 as well as Earl of Jersey in 1697. In 1681 he married Barbara Chiffinch. The 1st Earl of Jersey's sister, Elizabeth Villiers († 1733), was the presumed mistress of King William III of England from 1680 until 1695. Thomas Villiers († 1786), the second son of the 2nd Earl of Jersey, was created Baron Hyde and Earl of Clarendon in 1776.

On the death of the 4th Viscount Grandison in 1699, the title passed to his grandson, the 5th Viscount. He was the son of Brigadier-General the Hon. Edward Villiers († 1693), eldest son of the 4th Viscount. In 1721 the 5th Viscount Grandison was created Earl Grandison. Upon his death in 1766, the earldom became extinct while the viscountcy passed to his second cousin William Villiers, 3rd Earl of Jersey, who became the 6th Viscount Grandison. In 1746 Elizabeth Mason, daughter of the 1st Earl Grandison, was created Viscountess Grandison, and in 1767 she was made Viscountess Villiers and Countess Grandison. All three titles became extinct on the death of the 2nd Earl Grandison in 1800.

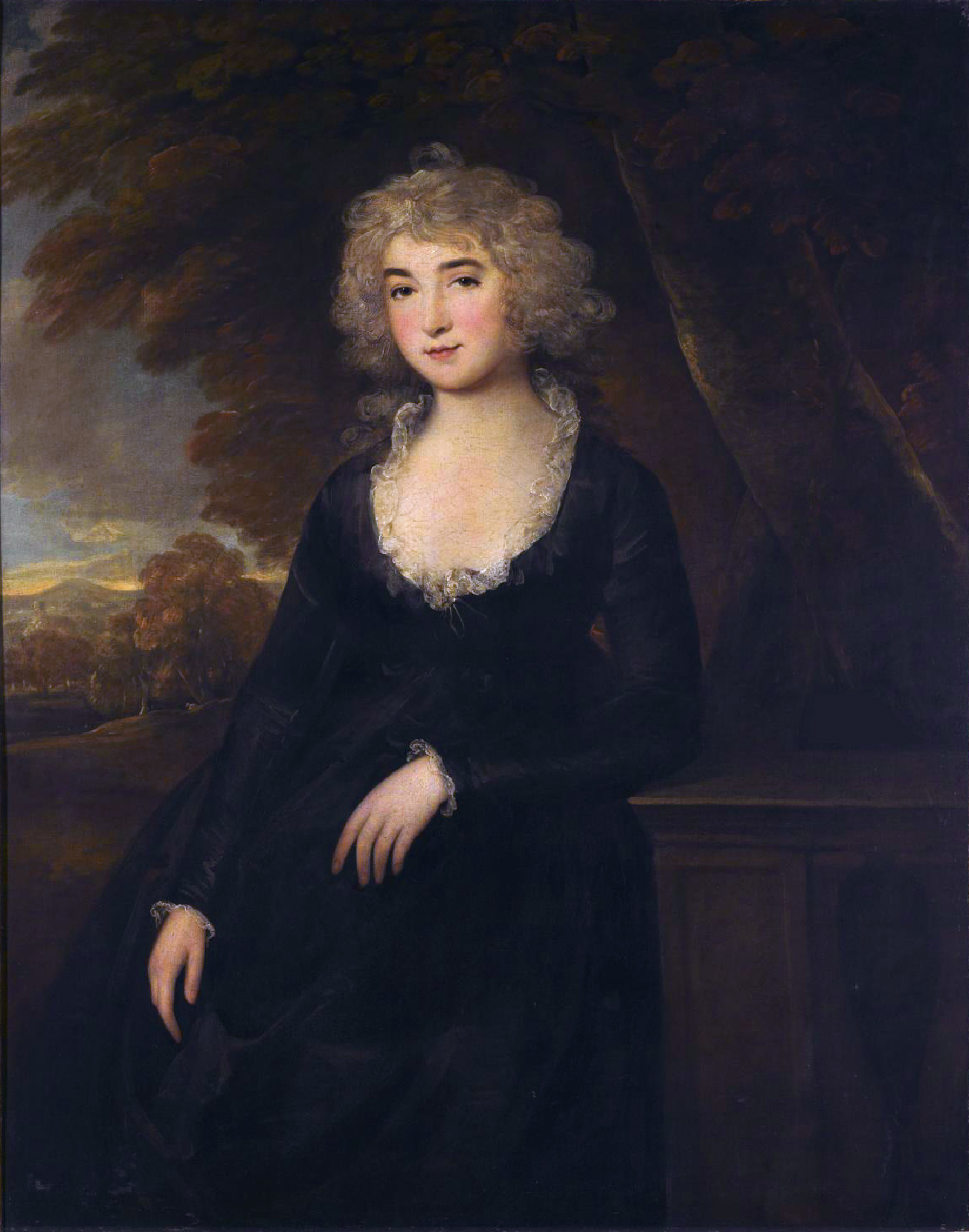
Frances Villiers, Countess of Jersey, a mistress of King George IV when he was Prince of Wales.

Frances Villiers, Countess of Jersey, wife of George Villiers, 4th Earl of Jersey, was Lady of the Bedchamber to Caroline of Brunswick and one of the mistresses of King George IV.

Theresa Villiers (born 1968), a British Conservative Party politician and former Secretary of State for Northern Ireland, is a descendant of Edward Ernest Villiers (1806–1843), a son of George Villiers († 1827) and brother of George Villiers, 4th Earl of Clarendon.

== Notable members ==
- Sir George Villiers (c. 1544–1606)
  - Sir Edward Villiers (c. 1585–1626)
    - William Villiers, 2nd Viscount Grandison (1614–1643)
      - Barbara Villiers (1640–1709)
    - John Villiers, 3rd Viscount Grandison (c. 1616–1659)
    - George Villiers, 4th Viscount Grandison (1618–1699)
      - Edward FitzGerald-Villiers (c. 1654–1693)
        - John Villiers, 1st Earl Grandison (c. 1684–1766)
          - James FitzGerald-Villiers (1708–1732)
          - Lady Elizabeth Villiers (1718–1782)
            - George Mason-Villiers, 2nd Earl Grandison (1751–1800)
        - Harriet Villiers (1680–1736)
          - William Pitt, 1st Earl of Chatham (1708–1778) (Prime Minister)
            - William Pitt the Younger (1759–1806) (Prime Minister)
    - Sir Edward Villiers (1620–1689)
      - Edward Villiers, 1st Earl of Jersey (1656–1711)
        - William Villiers, 2nd Earl of Jersey (c. 1682–1721)
          - William Villiers, 3rd Earl of Jersey (d. 1769)
            - George Villiers, 4th Earl of Jersey (1735–1805)
              - George Child Villiers, 5th Earl of Jersey (1773–1859)
                - George Child Villiers, 6th Earl of Jersey (1808–1859)
                  - Victor Child Villiers, 7th Earl of Jersey (1845–1915)
                    - George Child Villiers, 8th Earl of Jersey (1873–1923)
                      - George Child Villiers, 9th Earl of Jersey (1910–1998)
                        - George Child Villiers, Viscount Villiers (1948–1998)
                          - William Child Villiers, 10th Earl of Jersey (b. 1976)
                - Frederick Child Villiers (1815–1871)
                - Francis Child Villiers (1819–1862)
                - Lady Sarah Child-Villiers (1822–1853)
              - Lady Caroline Villiers (1774–1835)
          - Thomas Villiers, 1st Earl of Clarendon (1709–1786)
            - Thomas Villiers, 2nd Earl of Clarendon (1753–1824)
            - John Villiers, 3rd Earl of Clarendon (1757–1838)
            - George Villiers (1759–1827)
              - George Villiers, 4th Earl of Clarendon (1800–1870)
                - Lady Emily Villiers (1843–1927)
                - Edward Villiers, 5th Earl of Clarendon (1846–1914)
                  - George Villiers, 6th Earl of Clarendon (1877–1955)
                    - George Villiers, Lord Hyde (1906–1935)
                      - Laurence Villiers, 7th Earl of Clarendon (1933–2009)
                        - George Villiers, 8th Earl of Clarendon (b. 1976)
                - Sir Francis Hyde Villiers (1852–1925)
                  - Eric Hyde Villiers (1881–1964)
                    - James Villiers (1933–1998)
                  - Algernon Hyde Villiers (1886–1917)
                    - Charles Hyde Villiers (1912–1992)
              - Thomas Hyde Villiers (1801–1832)
                - Charles Villiers (1830–1893)
                  - Ernest Villiers (1863–1923)
                    - Amherst Villiers (1900–1991)
              - Charles Pelham Villiers (1802–1898)
              - Maria Theresa Villiers (1803–1865)
              - Edward Ernest Villiers (1806–1843)
                - Maria Theresa Villiers (1836–1925)
                - Edith Villiers (1841–1936)
              - Henry Montagu Villiers (1813–1861)
      - Elizabeth Villiers (1657–1733)
  - John Villiers, 1st Viscount Purbeck (c. 1591–1658)
  - George Villiers, 1st Duke of Buckingham (1592–1628)
    - George Villiers, 2nd Duke of Buckingham (1628–1687)
  - Christopher Villiers, 1st Earl of Anglesey (c. 1593–1630)
    - Charles Villiers, 2nd Earl of Anglesey (d. 1661)
  - Susan Villiers (d. 1652)

== Titles ==
=== Earls of Buckingham (1618) ===
- Mary Villiers, Countess of Buckingham (1570–1632)

=== Villiers baronets (1619) ===
- Sir William Villiers, 1st Baronet (c. 1575–1629)
- Sir George Villiers, 2nd Baronet (1620–1682)
- Sir William Villiers, 3rd Baronet (1645–1712)

=== Viscounts Purbeck (1619) ===
- John Villiers, 1st Viscount Purbeck (c. 1591–1658)

=== Viscounts Grandison (1623) ===
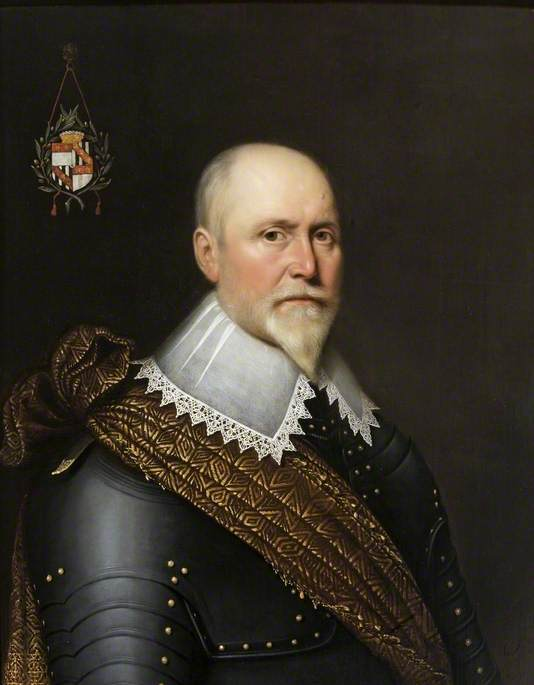
Oliver St John, 1st Viscount Grandison, 1st Baron Tregoz (c. 1560–1630)

- Oliver St John, 1st Viscount Grandison (c. 1560–1630)
- William Villiers, 2nd Viscount Grandison (1614–1643)
- John Villiers, 3rd Viscount Grandison (died c. 1661)
- George Villiers, 4th Viscount Grandison (c. 1617–1699)
- John Villiers, 5th Viscount Grandison, 1st Earl Grandison (1692–1766), after whom the title passed to the 3rd Earl of Jersey
- William Villiers, 6th Viscount Grandison, 3rd Earl of Jersey (died 1769), after which the title remained merged with that of Earl of Jersey

=== Earls of Anglesey (1623) ===
- Christopher Villiers, 1st Earl of Anglesey (d. 1630)
- Charles Villiers, 2nd Earl of Anglesey (d. 1661)

=== Dukes of Buckingham (1623) ===
- George Villiers, 1st Duke of Buckingham (1592–1628)
- George Villiers, 2nd Duke of Buckingham (1628–1687)

=== Dukes of Cleveland (1670) ===
- Barbara Villiers, 1st Duchess of Cleveland (1641–1709)
- Charles FitzRoy, 2nd Duke of Cleveland (1662–1730)
- William FitzRoy, 3rd Duke of Cleveland (1698–1774)

=== Earls of Jersey (1697) ===
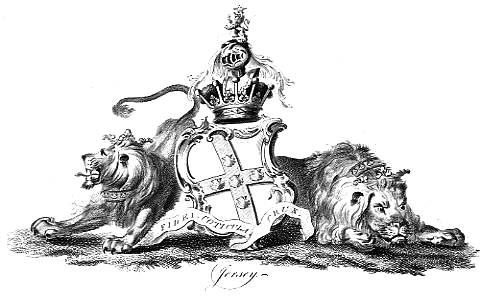
Arms of the Villiers Earl of Jersey

- Edward Villiers, 1st Earl of Jersey (1656–1711)
- William Villiers, 2nd Earl of Jersey (d. 1721)
- William Villiers, 3rd Earl of Jersey (d. 1769)
- George Bussy Villiers, 4th Earl of Jersey (1735–1805)
- George Child Villiers, 5th Earl of Jersey (1773–1859)
- George Augustus Frederick Child Villiers, 6th Earl of Jersey (1808–1859)
- Victor Albert George Child Villiers, 7th Earl of Jersey (1845–1915)
- George Henry Robert Child Villiers, 8th Earl of Jersey (1873–1923)
- George Francis Child Villiers, 9th Earl of Jersey (1910–1998)
- (George Francis) William Child Villiers, 10th Earl of Jersey (b. 1976)

=== Earls Grandison (1746) ===
- Elizabeth Mason, 1st Countess Grandison (died 1782)
- George Mason-Villiers, 2nd Earl Grandison (1751–1800)

=== Earls of Clarendon (1776) ===
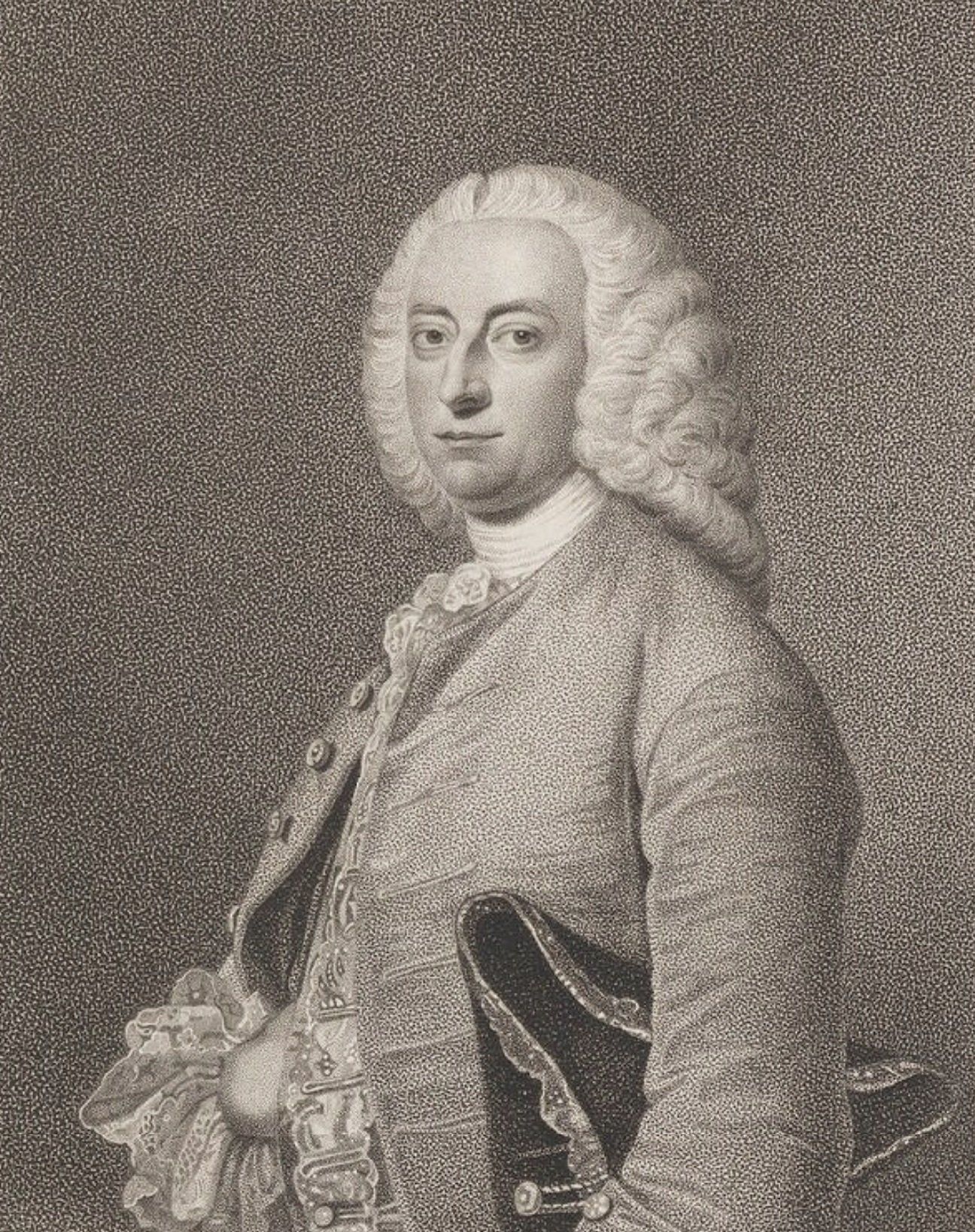
Thomas Villiers, 1st Earl of Clarendon

- Thomas Villiers, 1st Earl of Clarendon (1709–1786)
- Thomas Villiers, 2nd Earl of Clarendon (1753–1824)
- John Charles Villiers, 3rd Earl of Clarendon (1757–1838)
- George William Frederick Villiers, 4th Earl of Clarendon (1800–1870)
- Edward Hyde Villiers, 5th Earl of Clarendon (1846–1914)
- George Herbert Hyde Villiers, 6th Earl of Clarendon (1877–1955)
- George Frederick Laurence Hyde Villiers, 7th Earl of Clarendon (1933–2009)
- George Edward Laurence Villiers, 8th Earl of Clarendon (b. 1976)

=== Notable marriages ===
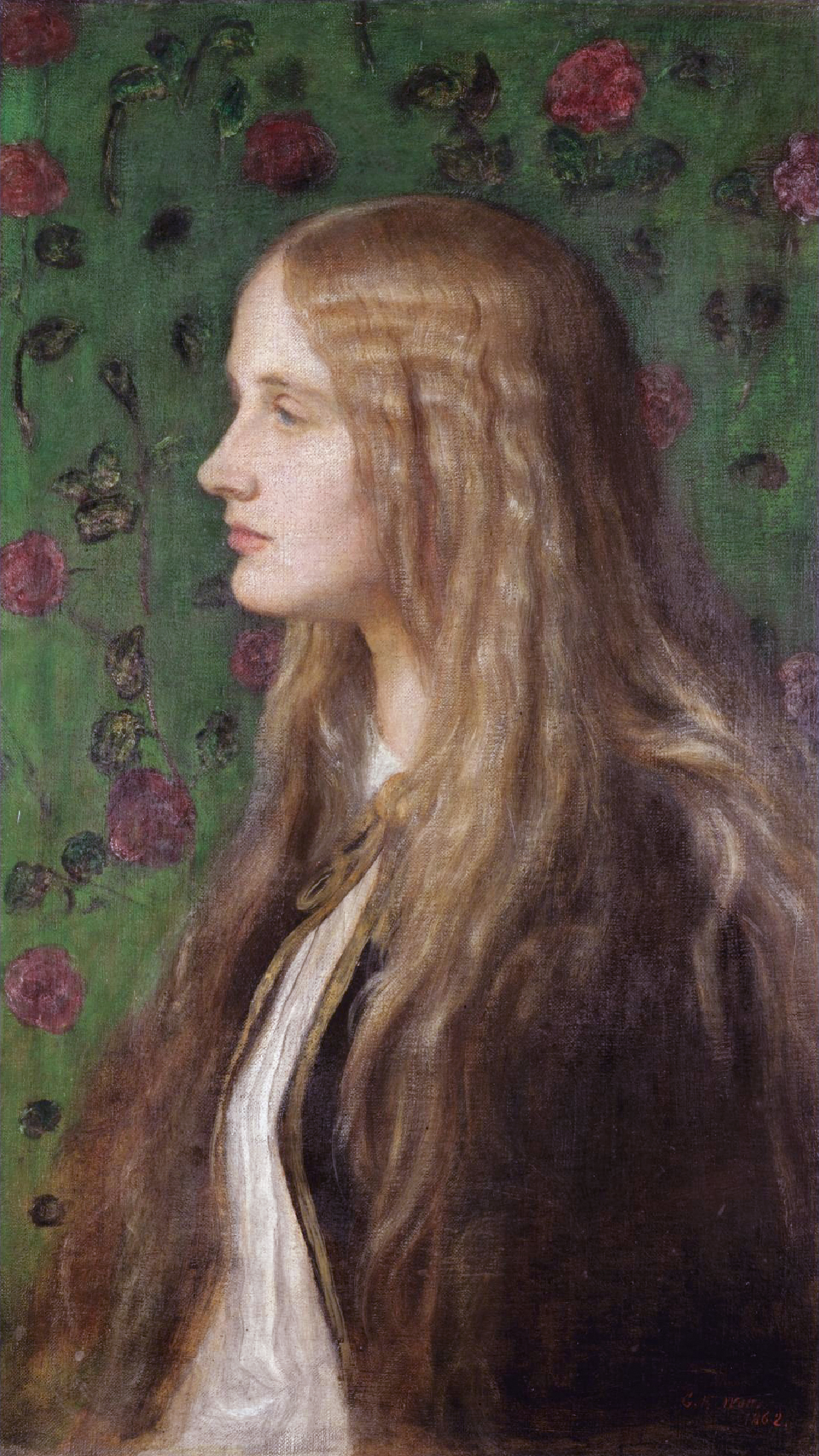
Edith Villiers became the Vicereine of India.

- Edith Villiers became Countess Lytton and the Vicereine of India.
- George Villiers, 1st Duke of Buckingham († 1628), son of Sir George Villiers († 1606), married in 1620, against her father's objections, Lady Katherine Manners, later suo jure Baroness de Ros, daughter of the 6th Earl of Rutland.
- Elizabeth Villiers († 1654), daughter of Sir George Villiers († 1606), married John Boteler, 1st Baron Boteler of Brantfield.
- Anne Villiers († 1588), daughter of Sir George Villiers († 1606), married Sir William Washington (1590-1648), brother of Lawrence Washington, great-great-grandfather of George Washington.
- John Villiers, 1st Viscount Purbeck († 1658), son of Sir George Villiers († 1606), married Frances Coke, daughter of Sir Edward Coke by his second wife, Elizabeth Cecil, daughter of Thomas Cecil, 1st Earl of Exeter.
- Susan Villiers († 1652), daughter of Sir George Villiers († 1606), married William Feilding, 1st Earl of Denbigh, parents-in-law to James Hamilton, 1st Duke of Hamilton.
- William Villiers, 2nd Viscount Grandison († 1643), married Mary Bayning, daughter and heiress of Paul Bayning, 1st Viscount Bayning.
- Barbara Villiers, Duchess of Cleveland († 1709), daughter of William Villiers, 2nd Viscount Grandison, married in 1659, against his family's wishes, Roger Palmer, 1st Earl of Castlemaine.
- Elizabeth Villiers († 1733), daughter of Sir Edward Villiers († 1689), married in 1695 George Hamilton, 1st Earl of Orkney.
- George Villiers, 4th Earl of Clarendon († 1870) married Lady Katherine Foster-Barham, daughter of James Grimston, 1st Earl of Verulam.
- Constance Villiers († 1922), daughter of George Villiers, 4th Earl of Clarendon, married Frederick Stanley, 16th Earl of Derby.
- Alice Villiers († 1897), daughter of George Villiers, 4th Earl of Clarendon, married Edward Bootle-Wilbraham, 1st Earl of Lathom.
- Emily Theresa Villiers († 1927), daughter of George Villiers, 4th Earl of Clarendon, married Odo Russell, 1st Baron Ampthill.
- Henry Montagu Villiers († 1908), son of Henry Montagu Villiers, married firstly Victoria Russell, daughter of John Russell, 1st Earl Russell, and secondly Charlotte Louisa Emily Cadogan, granddaughter of both George Cadogan, 3rd Earl Cadogan and Henry Paget, 1st Marquess of Anglesey.
- Gertrude Villiers († 1906), daughter of Henry Montagu Villiers, married Berkeley Paget, a great-grandson of Henry Bayly Paget, 1st Earl of Uxbridge.

=== Other notable members ===
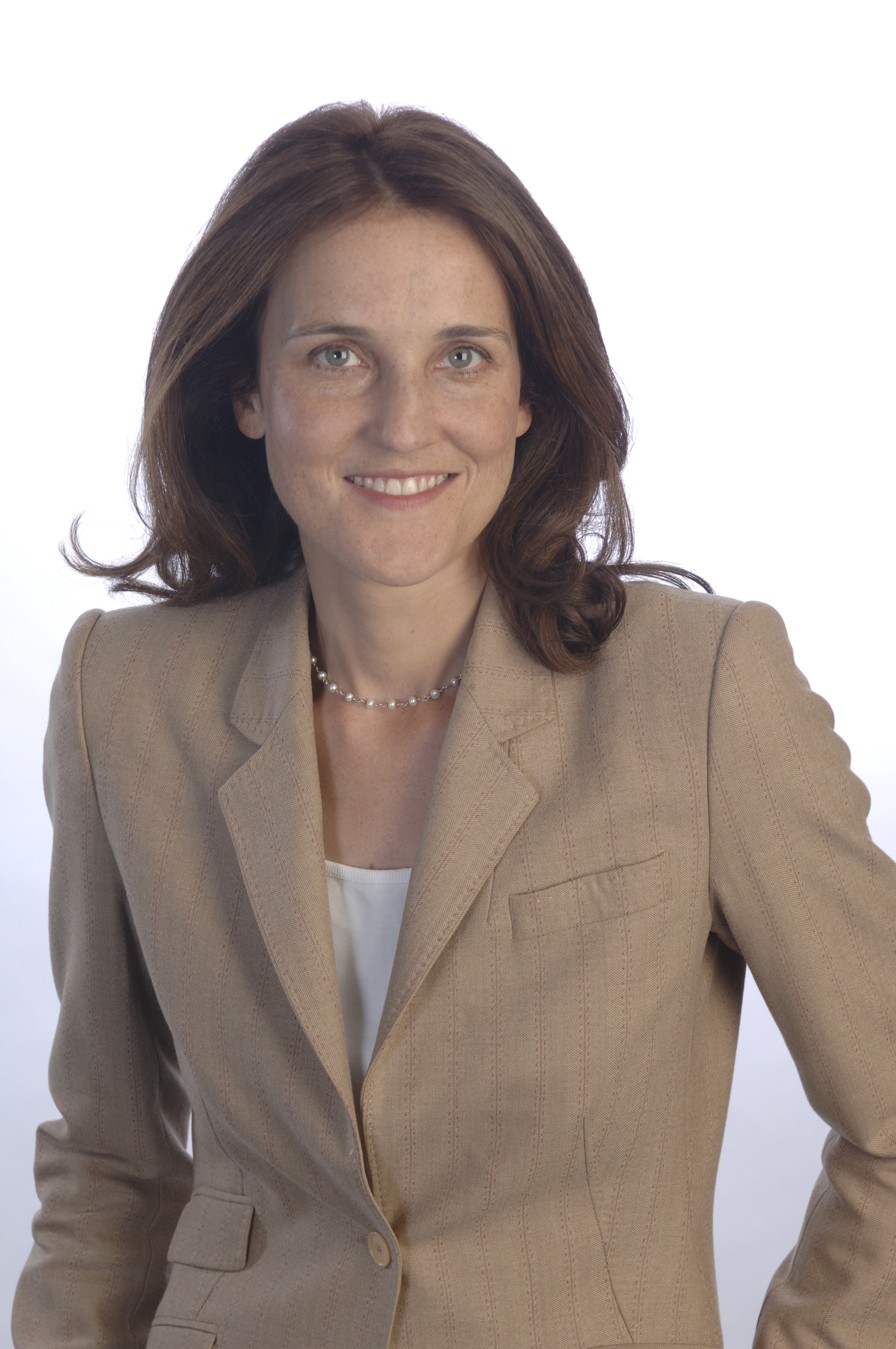
Theresa Villiers (born 1968) was Secretary of State for Northern Ireland from 2012 until 2016

- Edward Villiers († 1693), eldest son of George Villiers, 4th Viscount Grandison, and his wife Mary, daughter of Francis Leigh, 1st Earl of Chichester. In 1677, he married the heiress Katherine FitzGerald, through whom he gained substantial property in County Waterford. He adopted the surname FitzGerald-Villiers to reflect this inheritance. Their children included John, later 5th Viscount and 1st Earl Grandison, and Harriet Villiers, who married Robert Pitt and was the mother of William Pitt, 1st Earl of Chatham.
- George Villiers († 1827), politician. He was the third son of Thomas Villiers, 1st Earl of Clarendon.
- Thomas Hyde Villiers († 1832), politician. He was a son of George Villiers († 1827).
- Henry Montagu Villiers († 1861), Bishop of Carlisle in 1856 and Bishop of Durham from 1860 to 1861. He was a son of George Villiers († 1827).
- Charles Pelham Villiers († 1898) politician. He was a son of George Villiers († 1827).
- James Villiers (1933–1998), actor. The grandson of Sir Francis Hyde Villiers and great-grandson of George Villiers, 4th Earl of Clarendon; his mother was descended from Earl Talbot.
- Theresa Villiers (born 1968), politician, Secretary of State for Northern Ireland (2012–2016). She is a direct male-line descendant of George Villiers († 1827).
- Christopher Villiers (born 1960), actor. Descendant of Henry Montagu Villiers.

== Members of the Order of the Garter ==
Several members of the Villiers family have also been knights of the Order of the Garter. The following is a list is of all Villiers members of this order, across all branches of the family, along with their year of investiture.

- 1616 – George Villiers, 1st Duke of Buckingham
- 1649 – George Villiers, 2nd Duke of Buckingham
- 1849 – George Villiers, 4th Earl of Clarendon
- 1937 – George Villiers, 6th Earl of Clarendon

== Family tree ==
Villiers family tree including the Dukes of Buckingham (2nd creation), Earls of Clarendon, Earls of Jersey, and Earls of Rochester

John St John by 1495–1558
Nicholas St. John by 1526–1589
Viscount Grandison of Limerick, 1620; Baron Tregoz, 1626	Earl (Countess) of Buckingham (5th creation), 1618
John St. John c. 1552–1594	Oliver St. John c. 1560–1630; 1st Viscount Grandison, etc.	Mary (Beaumont) Villiers c. 1570–1632; Countess of Buckingham	George Villiers (of Brokesby) c. 1544–1606
Barony Tregoz extinct, 1630	Earldom for life only, extinct 1632
Viscount Villiers and Baron Whaddon, 1616; Earl of Buckingham (4th creation), 1617; Marquess of Buckingham (1st creation), 1618
Villiers baronets, 1619	Viscount Purbeck and Baron Villiers of Stoke, 1619	Duke of Buckingham (2nd creation) and Earl of Coventry (1st creation), 1623	Earl of Anglesey (1st creation) and Baron Villiers of Daventry, 1623
William Villiers c. 1575–1629; 1st Baronet	Susan (Villiers) Feilding; 1583–1652 (m. William Feilding, 1st Earl of Denbigh)	Barbara St John	Edward Villiers c. 1585–1626	John Villiers c. 1591–1658; Viscount Purbeck, etc.	Katherine Manners; 1603–1649; Baroness de Ros	George Villiers; 1592–1628; 1st Duke of Buckingham, etc.	Christopher Villiers c. 1593–1630; 1st Earl of Anglesey, etc.
Viscountcy of Purbeck extinct, 1658
Baron Hyde of Hindon (1st creation), 1660; Earl of Clarendon (1st creation) and Viscount Cornbury, 1661
George Villiers; 1620–1682; 2nd Baronet	William Villiers; 1614–1643; 2nd Viscount Grandison	John Villiers c. 1616–1659; 3rd Viscount Grandison	George Villiers; 1618–1699; 4th Viscount Grandison	Edward Villiers; 1620–1689	George Villiers; 1628–1687; 2nd Duke of Buckingham, etc., Baron de Ros	Christopher Villiers d. 1661; 2nd Earl of Anglesey, etc.	Edward Hyde; 1609–1674; 1st Earl of Clarendon, etc.
Dukedom of Buckingham (2nd creation) and subsidiary titles extinct, 1687	Earldom of Anglesey (1st creation) and subsidiary title extinct extinct, 1661
Earl of Rochester 2nd creation, Viscount Hyde, and Baron Wotton Basset, 1682
George Villiers; 1645–1712; 3rd Baronet	Barbara (Villiers) Palmer; 1640–1709; Duchess of Cleveland, Countess of Castlemaine, Baroness Nonsuch	King Charles II; 1630–1685	King James II; 1633–1701	Anne Hyde; 1637–1671	Henry Hyde; 1638–1709; 2nd Earl of Clarendon, etc.	Laurence Hyde; 1642–1711; 1st Earl of Rochester, etc.
Villiars Baronets extinct, 1712	Viscount Villiers and Baron Villiers of Hoo, 1691; Earl of Jersey, 1697
Edward FitzGerald-Villiers c. 1654–1693	Edward Villiers c. 1656–1711; 1st Earl of Jersey, etc.	Queen Mary II; 1662–1694	Queen Anne; 1665–1714	Edward Hyde; 1661–1723; 3rd Earl of Clarendon, etc.	Henry Hyde; 1672–1753; 4th Earl of Clarendon, etc., 2nd Earl of Rochester, etc.
Earldom of Clarendon (1st creation) and subsidiary titles extinct, 1753
Earl Grandison (1st creation), 1721
John Villiers c. 1684–1766; Earl Grandison, 5th Viscount Grandison	Harriet Villiers; 1680–1736	William Villiers c. 1682–1721; 2nd Earl of Jersey, etc.	Jane Capell; 1694–1724; Countess of Essex
Earldom of Grandison (1st creation) extinct, 1766
Viscount Grandison (2nd creation), 1746; Earl Grandison (2nd creation), 1767	Baron Hyde of Hindon (2nd creation), 1756; Earl of Clarendon (2nd creation), 1776
James FitzGerald-Villiers; 1708–1732 styled Lord Villiers	Elizabeth Villiers d. 1782; 1st Countess Grandison, etc.	William Pitt "the Elder"; 1708–1778; Earl of Chatham, Prime Minister	William Villiers d. 1769; 3rd Earl of Jersey, etc., 6th Viscount Grandison	Thomas Villiers; 1709–1786; 1st Earl of Clarendon, etc.	Charlotte Capell; 1721–1790	Mary Capell d. 1782 (m. Henry Seymour, Lord Beauchamp)	Henry Hyde; 1710–1753; 5th Baron Hyde
George Mason-Villiers; 1751–1800; 2nd Earl Grandison, etc.	William Pitt "the Younger"; 1759–1806; Prime Minister	George Bussy Villiers; 1735–1805; 4th Earl of Jersey, etc., 7th Viscount Grandison
Earldom of Grandison (2nd creation) and Viscountcy Grandison (2nd creation) extinct, 1800
Child added to name by royal license, 1819
George Child Villiers; 1773–1859; 5th Earl of Jersey, etc., 8th Viscount Grandison (m. Sarah Sophia Fay)	Thomas Villiers; 1753–1824; 2nd Earl of Clarendon, etc.	John Charles Villiers; 1757–1838; 3rd Earl of Clarendon, etc.	Maria Villiers; 1761–1844	George Villiers; 1759–1827
George Augustus Frederick Child Villiers; 1808–1859; 6th Earl of Jersey, etc., 9th Viscount Grandison	Francis John Robert Child Villiers; 1819–1862	George William Frederick Villiers; 1800–1870; 4th Earl of Clarendon, etc.	Thomas Hyde Villiers; 1801–1832 Charles Pelham Villiers; 1802–1893	Maria Theresa Lewis; 1803–1865 Henry Montagu Villiers; 1813–1861
Victor Albert George Child Villiers; 1845–1915; 7th Earl of Jersey, etc., 10th Viscount Grandison (m. Margaret Elizabeth Leigh)	Emily Theresa Russell; 1843–1927 (m. Odo Russell, 1st Baron Ampthill)	Edward Hyde Villiers; 1845–1846	Edward Hyde Villiers; 1846–1914; 5th Earl of Clarendon, etc.	Francis Hyde Villiers; 1852–1925
George Henry Robert Child Villiers; 1873–1923; 8th Earl of Jersey, etc., 11th Viscount Grandison	George Herbert Hyde Villiers; 1877–1955; 6th Earl of Clarendon, etc.	Eric Hyde Villiers; 1881–1964
George Francis Child-Villiers; 1910–1998; 9th Earl of Jersey, etc., 12th Viscount Grandison (m. Virginia Cherrill)	George Herbert Arthur Hyde Villiers; 1906–1935 styled Lord Hyde
George Henry Child Villiers; 1948–1998 styled Viscount Villiers	George Frederick "Laurence" Hyde Villiers; 1933–2009; 7th Earl of Clarendon, etc.	James Villiers; 1933–1998
George Francis "William" Child Villiers b. 1976; 10th Earl of Jersey, etc., 13th Viscount Grandison	George Edward Laurence Villiers b. 1976; 8th Earl of Clarendon, etc.
Amelie Natasha Sophia Child Villiers b. 2008	George Henry William Child Villiers b. 2015 styled Viscount Villiers	Edward George James Villiers b. 2008 styled Lord Hyde
Heir apparent to the Earl of Jersey	Heir apparent to the Earl of Clarendon
