= George Villiers (1759–1827) =

British courtier and politician (1759–1827)

The Hon. George Villiers
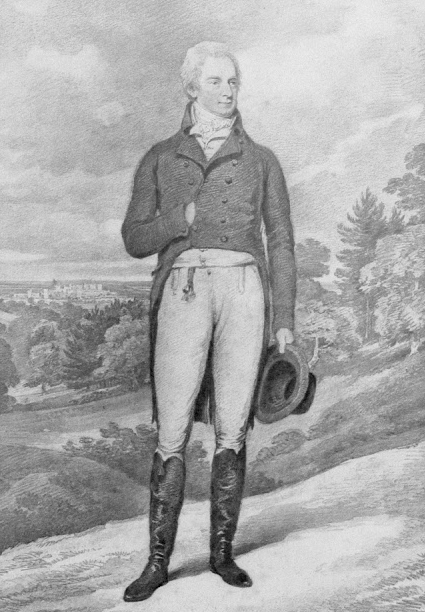
- Villiers in c. 1800

Member of Parliament for Warwick
- In office 1792–1800 Serving with The Lord Arden (1792–96); Samuel Gaussen (1796–1800)
- Preceded by: The Lord Arden; Major Henry Gage
- Succeeded by: Parliament of the United Kingdom

Member of Parliament for Warwick
- In office 1801–1802 Serving with Samuel Gaussen
- Preceded by: Parliament of Great Britain
- Succeeded by: Charles Mills; Lord Brooke

Personal details
- Born: 23 November 1759
- Died: 21 March 1827 (aged 67)
- Party: Tory
- Spouse: Theresa Parker (m. 1798)
- Children: 10, including George, Thomas, Charles, Henry and Maria
- Parents: Thomas Villiers, 1st Earl of Clarendon (father); Charlotte Capell (mother)
- Relatives: William Capell, 3rd Earl of Essex (maternal grandfather)
- Education: Eton College
- Alma mater: St John's College, Cambridge
- Military career
- Allegiance: United Kingdom
- Branch: British Army
- Service years: 1794-
- Rank: Captain
- Units: Western Troop; Hertfordshire Yeomanry

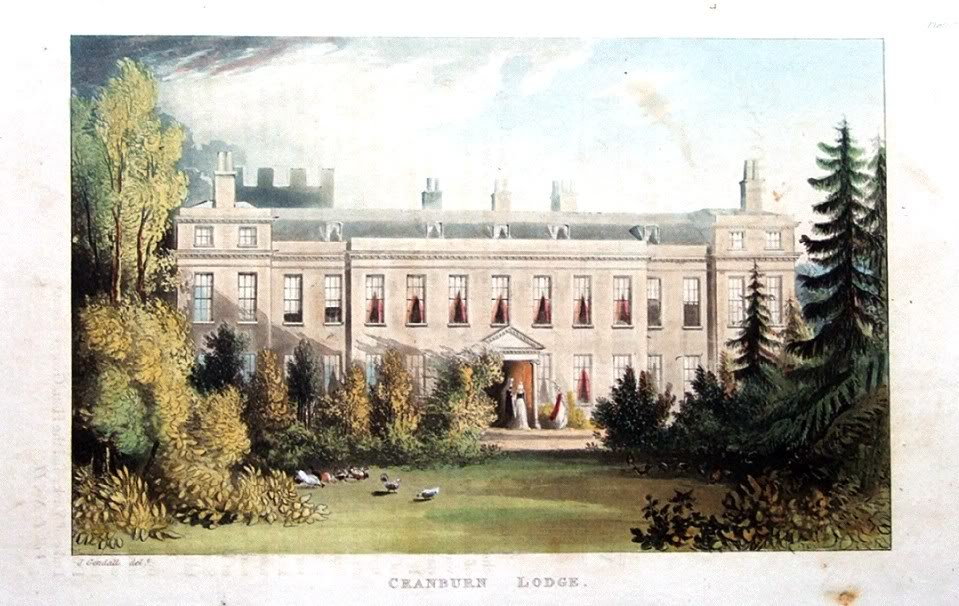
Cranbourne Lodge (by John Gendall) in what is now Windsor Great Park, Villiers's home from 1805 to 1812

The Hon. George Villiers (23 November 1759 – 21 March 1827) was a British courtier and politician from the Villiers family. The youngest son of the diplomat Lord Hyde (later Earl of Clarendon), he was an intimate of Princess Amelia and personal supporter of her father, George III. His favour within the Royal Family and his father's influence brought him a number of sinecures to support him. However, Villiers was more interested in the operation of the royal farms at Windsor Castle than in politics or the duties of his offices. When his bookkeeping as Paymaster of the Marines was carefully examined in 1810, Villiers's carelessness and the speculation of his clerk had left him in debt to the Crown by more than £250,000. This exposure touched off a public scandal; Villiers promptly surrendered all his property to the Crown and threw himself on the king's mercy. The misconduct of Joseph Hunt as Treasurer of the Ordnance to some extent obscured Villiers's own misconduct, and he was able to retain other sinecures and a stable, if reduced, income from them until his death in 1827.

== Upbringing and political career ==
Villiers was the youngest son of Thomas Villiers, 1st Earl of Clarendon, and Charlotte Capell. His maternal grandparents were William Capell, 3rd Earl of Essex, and Jane Hyde. George, like his brother, was educated at Eton College and then St John's College, Cambridge, graduating with an MA in 1779. It was presumably through the influence of his father, then Chancellor of the Duchy of Lancaster under the first Pitt ministry, that he was appointed a Groom of the Bedchamber to George III on 13 January 1783, and Clerk of the Council and Registrar of the Duchy of Lancaster in August 1786. A polished courtier, Villiers earned the nickname "Tiger" among his party for his vehement support of the king; although as Fanny Burney observed, his "remarkably slim, slight and delicate person" did not match the nickname.

In 1792, Villiers purchased the support of Lord Warwick, and was returned as Member of Parliament for Warwick in the by-election of 18 January 1792 as a Tory. On 19 March 1792, shortly after his entry into Parliament, Villiers was appointed to the office of Paymaster of Marines, a sinecure which would ultimately prove his undoing. The salary of the post was fixed at £600 p.a. after a reform in 1800. In 1794, Villiers became the Captain commanding the newly raised Western Troop of the Hertfordshire Gentlemen and Yeomanry-Cavalry.

He was elected unopposed in 1796, but did not stand for the borough in 1802. Though a friend of Pitt's government, he rarely attended the House; George Rose commented in a letter that Villiers's loss would have no impact on the Tories. While a member of parliament, in 1798, he married Lord Boringdon's daughter, Theresa, who would bear him ten children over the next two decades. After leaving Parliament, Villiers continued his presence at Court, and carried messages from the Princess Royal in Stuttgart to the king. In 1803, the duties of his office as paymaster were extended, and on 9 May, he was reappointed as Paymaster and Inspector-General of Marines, with a salary of £1,000 p.a. In the same year, he was commissioned a captain in the Watford Volunteer Cavalry. Villiers was prepared to intercede with the king on behalf of Pitt to fulfill the latter's desire for a more comprehensive ministry, which, however, was frustrated; and to bring Pitt's friends into the Ministry of All the Talents in 1806.

Villiers, indeed, enjoyed considerable favour with the king, who granted him a private bounty of £400 p.a. in 1804 after being compelled to refuse him an office at Windsor Park. He was allowed to hold simultaneous office as a groom of the bedchamber and paymaster, and the king determined to place him in charge of his farms at Windsor as bailiff. Villiers and his family lived at Windsor Old Lodge until 1805, when he was appointed ranger of Cranbourne Chase and he moved into Cranbourne Lodge, newly renovated as his residence. Villiers and his wife were particularly intimate with Princess Amelia, the king's favourite daughter, accounting in part for the Royal favour shown him. With the fall of the Ministry of All the Talents in 1807 and the formation of Portland's government, the Duke of Cumberland vigorously lobbied Portland to grant Villiers the mastership of the Buckhounds or some other office, on the grounds of Villiers having rendered "very serious and important services" to the Royal Family, but was unsuccessful.

In 1809, upon the death of John Fordyce, Surveyor General of the Land Revenues of the Crown, Portland proposed to replace that office and that of the Surveyor General of Woods, Forests, Parks, and Chases, then held by Lord Glenbervie, with a three-man commission (the Commissioners of Woods and Forests), and to make Villiers one of the junior commissioners. This reorganisation of the Crown Lands temporarily halted upon Portland's resignation and the formation of a new government under Spencer Perceval. This created an embarrassing difficulty for Villiers and his interest; George Canning did not choose to serve under Perceval, and Villiers's brother-in-law, the 2nd Lord Boringdon, was Canning's friend. Nor was the proposed appointment of Villiers universally popular; Lord Glenbervie, the proposed senior commissioner, vented his anger at Perceval's nomination of Villiers in his journal:

I know personally that he [Perceval] feels and is vexed at the intriguing, selfish, meddling, mischief-making qualities of Villiers, who by his own teizing, and the illecebrae of his wife has gained a great ascendancy over the royal mind, and has teized his Majesty and the Duke of Portland for that appointment, hoping thereby to smooth the way for his many jobs at Cranborne Lodge and his domineering authority over the Parks and Forest of Windsor.

— Lord Glenbervie, Glenbervie MS Journal, 19 December 1809

Nonetheless, Villiers continued to press his claims to office on Perceval, in a letter of 18 October 1809. He had, he said, turned down a pension of £1,200 p.a. for "reasons...which can never be publicly alluded to" and had received a promise from Portland to replace Fordyce as Surveyor General of the Land Revenues (a post worth £2,000 p.a.); Villiers would, however, be satisfied with the commissionership and £1,000 p.a. in addition, provided that he might retain his office of paymaster. In fact, that office was about to become the engine of Villiers's political destruction. He appears to have received the sinecure offices of registrar of the Vice-Admiralty Court of Gibraltar and marshal of the Vice-Admiralty Court of Antigua around this time. (Note: Thorne dates these appointments to 1811, but a letter of 27 January 1810 by "A.B." in Cobbett's political register refers to "sinecures at Gibraltar, and in the West Indies," presumably the same.)

== Scandal and disgrace ==
The value to the sinecurist of an office like that of Paymaster of Marines lay not so much in the official salary attached to it, but in the lax accounting procedures associated with disbursement of funds, which allowed the official to retain large sums of public money in his own hands for many years until accounts were made up. The office of Paymaster General had been reformed in 1783 to avoid these abuses, but these changes had not yet been extended to the Marines during Villiers's tenure.

He appears to have taken little interest in his official duties both as paymaster and inspector-general, leaving affairs in the hands of Edmund Waters. Waters had been his private secretary, and when Villiers came to office as paymaster, Waters was appointed chief clerk in that department, rising to deputy paymaster in 1797. Waters and Villiers invested in real estate with some of the money passing through the office; unfortunately for Villiers, Waters was also diverting some of the funds to his own interest in the Opera House, and the accounts of the office were in a shambles.

Well aware of the parlous state of the office's accounts, Waters retired from the Marine Pay Office in 1807 as an independently wealthy man (only to lose the fortune in his Opera House investments). The lax regime in the Pay Office rattled on, however, until 27 December 1809, when Perceval became aware of the state of Villiers's accounts. Villiers, to his credit, immediately resigned and took responsibility for his official debts. Perceval allowed him to proffer his resignation directly to the king, but Villiers could not face his master; Perceval informed the king of the state of affairs in a letter of 15 January 1810, laying the blame for the situation largely on Waters. Perceval's letter noted that "reports were circulating on the subject to such an extent as to make it impossible to hope that it would not become the subject of Parliamentary observation." By this time, Villiers's accounts had been audited through the year 1804, revealing him to be in arrears by the staggering sum of £280,000 through that point. On the advice of his brother-in-law Boringdon, Villiers offered up all his property to the Crown, although he could not hope to pay off the entire sum found wanting by this means. The episode left him in a condition of nervous prostration, the more so as he by now had five children to support. A letter by "A.B." in Cobbett's Political Register of 27 January 1810 assailed Villiers for his delinquency and estimated that his debt, with interest, might run to £500,000.

Fortunately for Villiers, his case was not to be prosecuted with the utmost rigour. He was to some degree protected by the joint efforts of Boringdon's friends and the Whig George Tierney, as well as his own quick action in surrendering his property through writs of extent; and the delinquency of Joseph Hunt, Treasurer of the Ordnance attracted attention and saved Villiers from the full wrath of the finance committee. Their report on the matter noted that the writ of extent had been to the amount of £264,000, but only £91,000 had been raised from the sale of his property, and about £30,000 from securities and the bond posted for him when he took office. The committee recommended the abolition of the office of Paymaster of Marines and the transfer of its duties to the Treasurer of the Navy, a recommendation which was not immediately acted upon. Villiers was left, in Boringdon's estimation, with a debt of £1,500–2,000, an annual income of £2,000–3,000, and the property in Cranbourne Lodge.

However, his disgrace was not over. After his resignation, Villiers had been replaced by Lord Mulgrave's brother, Edmund Phipps, as paymaster and lost his prospective place as a commissioner of woods and forests. Then, he was informed on 4 May 1810, after the release of the finance committee's report, that the king had removed from him the supervision of the farms at Windsor (he also lost the rangership). The news threw him into a state of great mental distress; he wrote to the king begging him to suspend judgement on the points raised by the committee's report. The king replied that it was "indispensable" to remove Villiers from his office under the circumstances, but extended his sympathy and suspended judgement on him.

The final disaster for Villiers occurred in November, when Princess Amelia died. After her death, Villiers and his wife attempted to blackmail the Royal Family by threatening (in a letter to her doctor, Sir Henry Halford) to release some of her correspondence, much to the shock of her sister, Princess Mary. The family finally moved out of Cranborne Lodge in 1812.

The untangling of his accounts dragged on until 1819, prolonged by his enemies at the Navy Office and his own fiscal incapacity. At length a balance of £220,000 was found against him, but by this time his career was hopelessly ruined. He left office as a groom of the bedchamber in 1815, but retained his vice-admiralty sinecures until his death. In 1824, he became heir presumptive to the Earldom of Clarendon but died in 1827 without inheriting it.

== Marriage and children ==
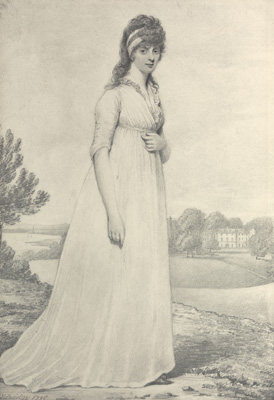
Hon. Theresa Parker, wife of George Villiers

On 17 April 1798, George married Theresa Parker. She was a daughter of John Parker, 1st Baron Boringdon, and his second wife Hon. Theresa Robinson. Her maternal grandparents were Thomas Robinson, 1st Baron Grantham, and Frances Worsley. They had ten children:

- Georgiana Villiers (12 February 1799 – 16 March 1799)
- George Villiers, 4th Earl of Clarendon (27 January 1800 – 27 June 1870)
- Thomas Hyde Villiers (24 January 1801 – 3 December 1832)
- Hon. Charles Pelham Villiers (3 January 1802 – 16 January 1898)
- Lady Maria Theresa Villiers (8 March 1803 – 9 November 1865). Married first novelist Thomas Henry Lister on 6 November 1830, they had a daughter, Alice Beatrice (d. 1863), who married Algernon Borthwick, 1st Baron Glenesk. After her first husband's death, she married politician Sir George Cornewall Lewis, 2nd Baronet on 25 October 1844.
- Frederick Adolphus Villiers (17 February 1805 – 21 November 1806)
- Hon. Edward Ernest Villiers (23 March 1806 – 30 October 1843) was educated at Merton College, Oxford (where he was a president of the United Debating Society), and Lincoln's Inn, and was later a Colonization Commissioner for South Australia. He married Elizabeth Charlotte Liddell, daughter of Thomas Liddell, 1st Baron Ravensworth, leaving a son and three daughters. Their daughter Edith Villiers married Robert Bulwer-Lytton, 1st Earl of Lytton, and became Lady of the Bedchamber to both Queen Victoria and Queen Alexandra.
- Augustus Villiers (2 March 1808 – 24 March 1808)
- Hon. Henry Montagu Villiers (4 January 1813 – 9 August 1861), Bishop of Durham from 1860 to his death.
- Lt. Hon. Augustus Algernon Villiers, RN (14 April 1817 – 13 July 1843), died unmarried, Knight of Isabella the Catholic

== Notes ==
Parliament of Great Britain
Preceded by The Lord Arden; Major Henry Gage	Member of Parliament for Warwick; 1792–1800; With: The Lord Arden 1792–1796; Samuel Gaussen 1796–1800	Succeeded by Parliament of the United Kingdom
Parliament of the United Kingdom
Preceded by Parliament of Great Britain	Member of Parliament for Warwick; 1801–1802; With: Samuel Gaussen	Succeeded by Charles Mills; Lord Brooke
