= Henry Montagu Villiers =

British clergyman and bishop

The Right Reverend and Honourable Henry Montagu Villiers
- Bishop of Durham
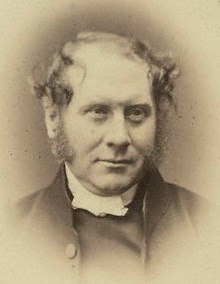
- Diocese: Durham
- In office: 1860–1861 (died)
- Predecessor: Charles Longley
- Successor: Charles Baring
- Other post: Bishop of Carlisle (1856–1860)

Personal details
- Born: 4 January 1813 London, UK
- Died: 9 August 1861 (aged 48) Auckland Castle, County Durham, UK
- Buried: Auckland Castle chapel
- Denomination: Anglican
- Residence: Auckland Castle (as Bishop of Durham)
- Parents: George Villiers; Theresa Parker
- Spouse: Amelia Maria Hulton
- Education: Christ Church, Oxford

Henry Montagu Villiers (4 January 1813 – 9 August 1861) was a British clergyman of the Church of England from the Villiers family.

== Life ==
He was educated at Christ Church, Oxford, graduating M.A. in 1837, and became vicar of Kenilworth in that year, rector of St. George's Church, Bloomsbury in 1841, and a canon of St. Paul's Cathedral from 1847 to 1856. He was a Doctor of Divinity and Bishop of Carlisle in 1856, and Bishop of Durham from 1860 to 1861.

== Family ==
He was the son of George Villiers and Theresa Parker, and grandson of the 1st Earl of Clarendon. He received a Royal Warrant of Precedence in 1839 entitling him to the rank of an earl's son.

=== Marriage ===
On 30 January 1837, he married Amelia Maria Hulton, daughter of William Hulton. They had at least 4 sons and 4 daughters:

1. Henry Montagu Villiers (13 November 1837 – 9 September 1908). Prebendary of St Paul's Cathedral. Married first Lady Victoria Russell, daughter of John Russell, 1st Earl Russell. Married secondly Charlotte Louisa Emily Cadogan, granddaughter of both George Cadogan, 3rd Earl Cadogan and Henry Paget, 1st Marquess of Anglesey
2. Charles Augustus Villiers, b. Apr 1839
3. Frederick Ernest Villiers (16 November 1840 – 14 October 1922), Major of the Hertfordshire Imperial Yeomanry cavalry force.
4. Amy Maria Villiers (b. 26 March 1842 – d. 20 October 1934), married Edward Cheese, a clergyman.
5. Gertrude Fanny Villiers (b. 19 August 1843 – d. 31 December 1906), married Berkeley Paget, a great-grandson of Henry Bayly Paget, 1st Earl of Uxbridge.
6. Wilbraham Edward Villiers (b. 2 August 1845)
7. Mary Agneta Villiers (b. 30 December 1846 – d. 22 May 1935), married James Hughes Cooper, a clergyman.
8. Evelyn Theresa Villiers (b. 23 August 1852 – d. 29 December 1943), married the Daniel J. Healy (born Hely-Hutchinson), an Irish naval officer and only son of Capt. Hon. John Healy (d. 1855) and grandson of John 3rd Earl of Donoughmore. They settled in Hampshire and had 3 sons, William, George and Patrick, and 2 daughters.

Church of England titles
Preceded by Hugh Percy	Bishop of Carlisle; 1856–1860	Succeeded by Samuel Waldegrave
Preceded by Charles Longley	Bishop of Durham; 1860–1861	Succeeded by Charles Baring
