= George Villiers, 4th Earl of Clarendon =

British diplomat and statesman (1800–1870)

The Right Honourable The Earl of Clarendon KG KP GCB PC
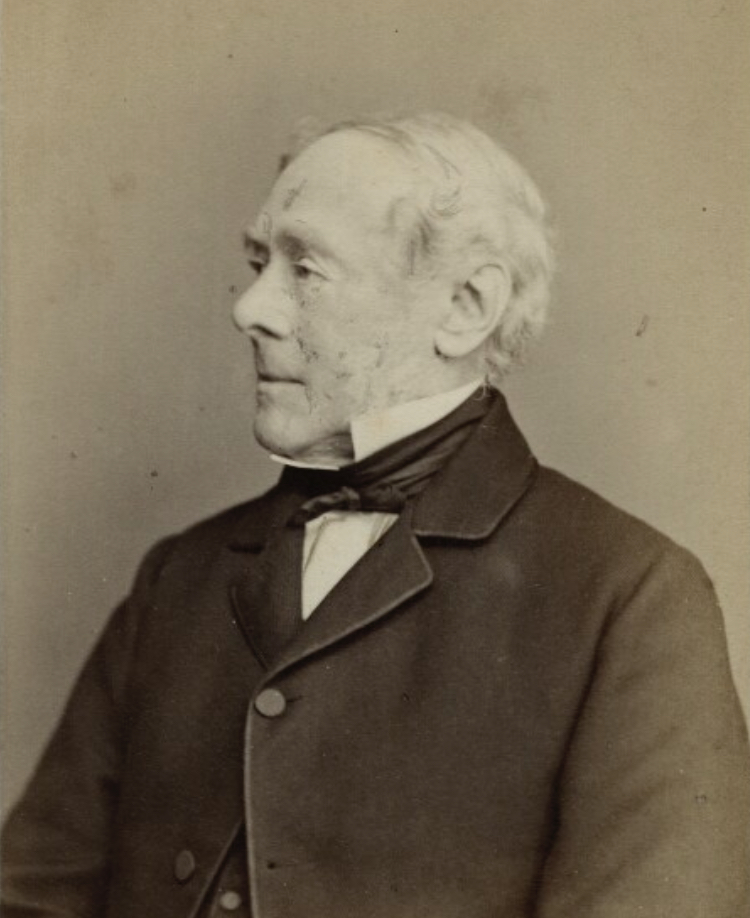
- The 4th Earl of Clarendon, c. 1860s

Secretary of State for Foreign Affairs
- In office 21 February 1853 – 26 February 1858
- Monarch: Victoria
- Prime Minister: The Earl of Aberdeen; The Viscount Palmerston
- Preceded by: John Russell
- Succeeded by: The Earl of Malmesbury
- In office 3 November 1865 – 6 July 1866
- Monarch: Victoria
- Prime Minister: John Russell
- Preceded by: John Russell
- Succeeded by: Lord Stanley
- In office 9 December 1868 – 27 June 1870
- Monarch: Victoria
- Prime Minister: William Ewart Gladstone
- Preceded by: Lord Stanley
- Succeeded by: The Earl Granville

Chancellor of the Duchy of Lancaster
- In office 31 October 1840 – 23 June 1841
- Monarch: Victoria
- Prime Minister: Viscount Melbourne
- Preceded by: The Lord Holland
- Succeeded by: George Grey
- In office 7 April 1864 – 3 November 1865
- Monarch: Victoria
- Prime Minister: The Viscount Palmerston; John Russell
- Preceded by: Edward Cardwell
- Succeeded by: George Goschen

Lord Lieutenant of Ireland
- In office 22 May 1847 – 1 March 1852
- Monarch: Queen Victoria
- Prime Minister: John Russell
- Preceded by: The Earl of Bessborough
- Succeeded by: The Earl of Eglinton

President of the Board of Trade
- In office 6 July 1846 – 22 July 1847
- Monarch: Victoria
- Prime Minister: John Russell
- Preceded by: The Marquess of Dalhousie
- Succeeded by: Henry Labouchere

Lord Keeper of the Privy Seal
- In office 15 January 1840 – 30 August 1841
- Prime Minister: The Viscount Melbourne
- Preceded by: The Earl of Bessborough
- Succeeded by: The Duke of Buckingham and Chandos

Personal details
- Born: 12 January 1800 London, England
- Died: 27 June 1870 (aged 70) London, England
- Party: Liberal
- Spouse: Lady Katherine Grimston (m. 1839)
- Children: 8, including Emily, Edward, and Francis
- Parent(s): George Villiers; Theresa Parker
- Education: St John's College, Cambridge

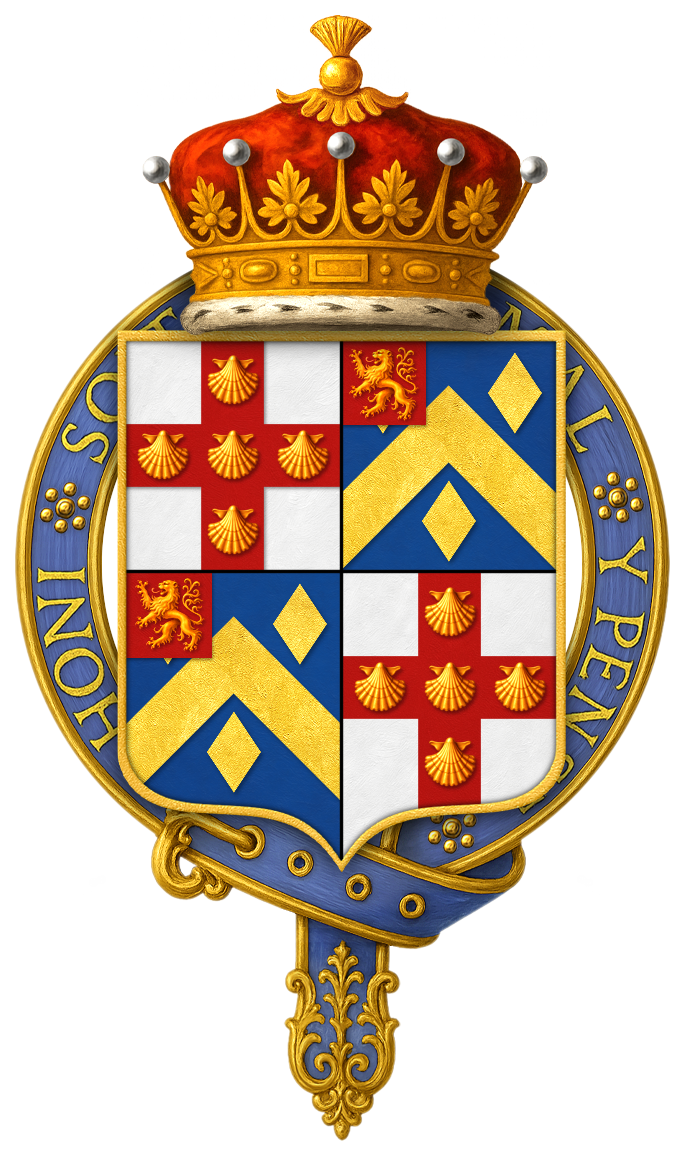
Quartered arms of George Villiers, 4th Earl of Clarendon, KG, GCB, PC

George William Frederick Villiers, 4th Earl of Clarendon (12 January 1800 – 27 June 1870) was an English diplomat and statesman from the Villiers family. He served a succession of Whig and Liberal administrations. This included as Viceroy in famine-stricken Ireland and, on the first of three occasions as Foreign Secretary, as the United Kingdom's chief representative at the Congress of Paris which ended the Crimean War.

== Background and education ==
Villiers was born in London to Hon. George Villiers MP and Hon. Theresa Parker, daughter of John Parker, 1st Baron Boringdon. He was the second born, but first surviving, of their 10 children. His father was the third son of Thomas Villiers, 1st Earl of Clarendon (himself the second son of William Villiers, 2nd Earl of Jersey). After the death of his father in 1827, George became heir to the earldom, succeeding his uncle Thomas Villiers, 2nd Earl of Clarendon (1753–1824), who died unmarried; and his uncle John Villiers, 3rd Earl of Clarendon (1757–1838), who died without an heir.

Villiers was educated at Christ's Hospital and St John's College, Cambridge, which he entered at the early age of sixteen, on 29 June 1816. In 1820, as the eldest son of an earl's brother of royal descent, he was able to take his MA degree under the statutes of the university then in force.

== Career ==
In the same year, Villiers was appointed attaché to the British embassy at Saint Petersburg. There he remained three years, and gained practical knowledge of diplomacy which would be of use to him later in his life. The Encyclopaedia Britannica stated that he had "received from nature a singularly handsome person, a polished and engaging address, a ready command of languages, and a remarkable power of composition". Upon his return to England in 1823, he was appointed to a commissionership of customs, an office which he retained for about ten years. In 1831, he was dispatched to France in a fruitless attempt to negotiate a commercial treaty.

=== Minister in Spain ===
On 16 August 1833, he was appointed minister at the Court of Spain. Ferdinand VII died within a month of his arrival at Madrid, and the infant Queen Isabella, then two years old, was placed on the throne based on the old Spanish custom of female inheritance – but her succession was challenged by Don Carlos, the late King's brother, by virtue of the Salic law of the House of Bourbon which Ferdinand had renounced before the birth of his daughter. Isabella II and her mother the Queen Regent Christina became the representatives of constitutional monarchy, Don Carlos of Catholic absolutism. The conflict, which had divided the despotic and the constitutional powers of Europe since the French Revolution of 1830, broke out into civil war in Spain, and by the Quadruple Treaty, signed on 22 April 1834, France and England pledged themselves to the defence of the constitutional thrones of Spain and Portugal. For six years, on behalf of the British government, Villiers continued to aid the Liberal government of Spain. He was unjustly accused of having supported the revolution of La Granja, which drove Christina, the Queen Mother, out of the kingdom, and raised Espartero to the regency. He undoubtedly supported the chiefs of the Liberal party, such as Espartero, against the intrigues of the French court; but the object of the British government was to establish Isabella as Queen on a truly national and liberal basis and to protect her against the foreign influence which eventually undermined her regime.

Slavery had been declared illegal in Spanish colonies from 1820, but still had not been eradicated. Villiers worked with the help of The Times correspondent David Turnbull to get slavery removed from Spanish colonies. In 1835 the Spanish reaffirmed their commitment to end slavery.

=== Succession to the Earldom, Offices of State in Britain ===
Villiers received the Grand Cross of the Bath in 1838 in acknowledgment of his services in Spain, and succeeded, on the death of his uncle, to the title of Earl of Clarendon; in the following year, having left Madrid, he married a young widow, Lady Katharine Foster-Barham (née Grimston), eldest daughter of James Grimston, 1st Earl of Verulam.

In January 1840 he entered Lord Melbourne's Whig administration as Lord Privy Seal, and from the death of Lord Holland that autumn he also held the office of Chancellor of the Duchy of Lancaster until the end of the ministry in 1841. Clarendon and Holland believed that friendly Anglo-French relations were important to promote peace and liberalism in Europe. He reluctantly supported Foreign Secretary Lord Palmerston's expulsion of the pro-French Mohammed Ali of Egypt from Syria but did not resign as it might break up a cabinet he had so recently joined.

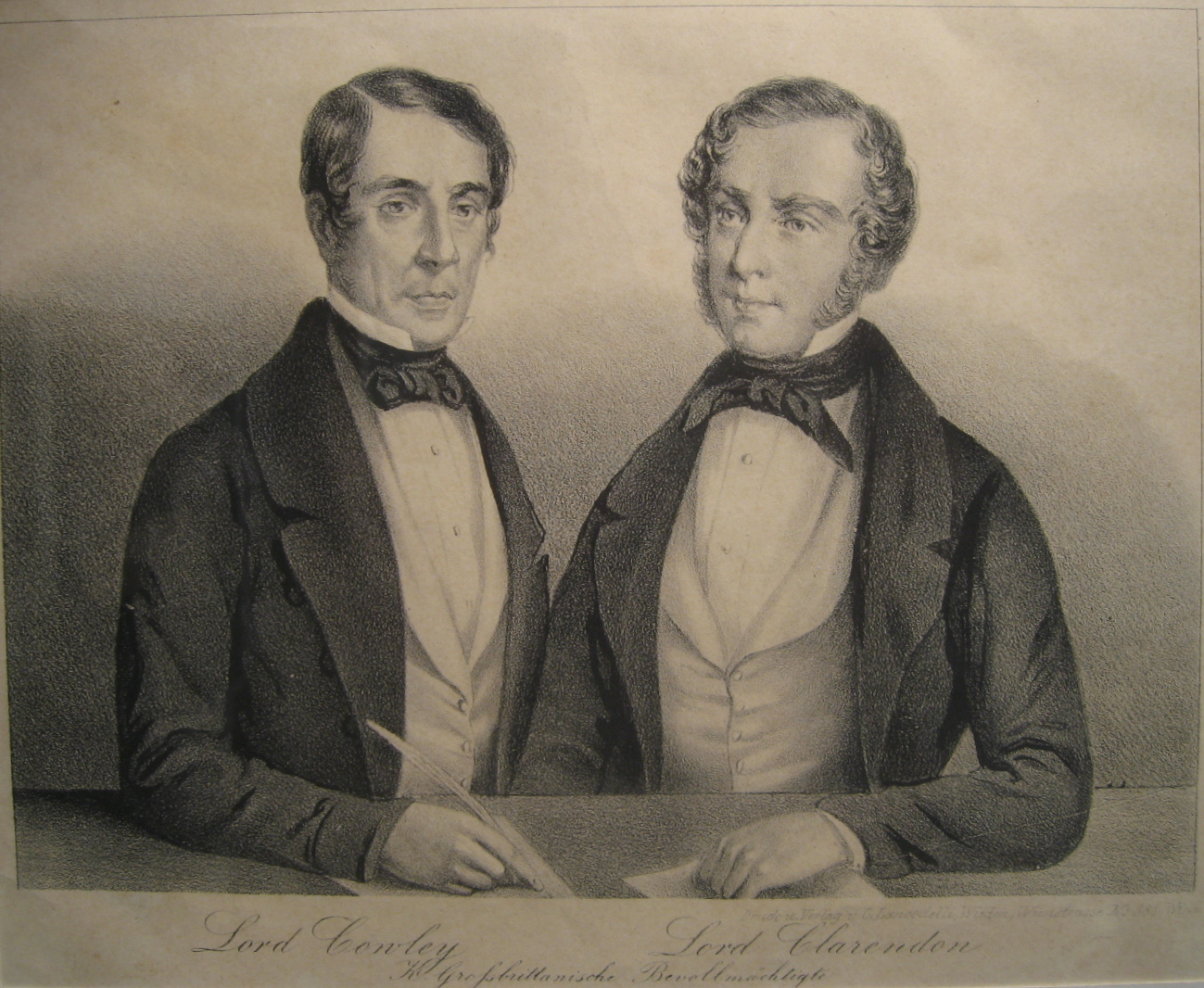
Clarendon with Lord Cowley (left)

During Sir Robert Peel's Conservative administration (1841–1846) Lord Clarendon took a strong interest in the triumph of free trade and in the repeal of the Corn Laws, a policy of which his younger brother Charles Pelham Villiers had been one of the earliest champions. Clarendon accepted the office of President of the Board of Trade in Lord John Russell's first administration in 1846.

=== Lord Lieutenant of Ireland ===
Clarendon was twice offered the Governor-Generalship of India, and once the Governor-Generalship of Canada, but he declined as it would have meant leaving British and European politics for some years.

In 1847, Clarendon was persuaded to accept the Lord Lieutenancy of Ireland, which the Cabinet wanted to abolish and transform into an Irish secretaryship of state. He arrived during the second year of the Great Famine. His reports on the scale of the crisis were regularly discounted by a government that deferred to the permanent head of the Treasury, Sir Charles Trevelyan.

Despairing of effective famine relief, Clarendon suggested to Russell, that "there is not another legislature in Europe that would disregard such suffering as now exists in the west of Ireland, or coldly persist in a policy of extermination". Lord Russell replied: "The course of English benevolence is frozen by insult, calumny and rebellion". In London there was consternation over Irish agitation for repeal of the Act of Union, reports of violence directed against landlords and the attempted rising by the Young Irelanders.

While he was to commute the sentences of the Young Ireland conspirators from hanging to life transportation, Clarendon did take stringent security measures, proclaiming martial law in large parts of the country and persuading Westminster to suspend Habeas Corpus. At the same time, he continued to plead what he saw as Ireland's case.

In the hope of garnering greater English sympathy, in 1849 he hosted Queen Victoria in Ireland. Her visit was deemed a "great popular success". But it appeared to make no impression on Irish policy. Trevelyan, a student of Thomas Malthus, insisted that Ireland be "left to the operation of natural causes" (and was fearful that borrowing to finance relief efforts in Ireland might panic the markets).

He attempted a policy of conciliation with the Roman Catholic Church in Ireland. In 1849, he sided with Catholic bishops in their objections to a non-denominational ("godless") scheme for higher education, and when an official inquiry failed to indict the Orange Order for the death of 20 Catholics in the Dolly's Brae affray, he dismissed the magistrate concerned, Lord Roden, and helped bring in the Party Processions Act (1850) to curtail the Protestant association. However, Orangemen accused Clarendon – who previously had supplied them with arms – of double-dealing. The claim was publicly upheld by Isaac Butt, Member of Parliament, a former Orangeman whom the famine had converted to the cause of Irish self-government. When he returned to England following the fall of the Russell ministry in February 1852, "he was distrusted by all sides in Ireland".

=== Foreign Secretary ===
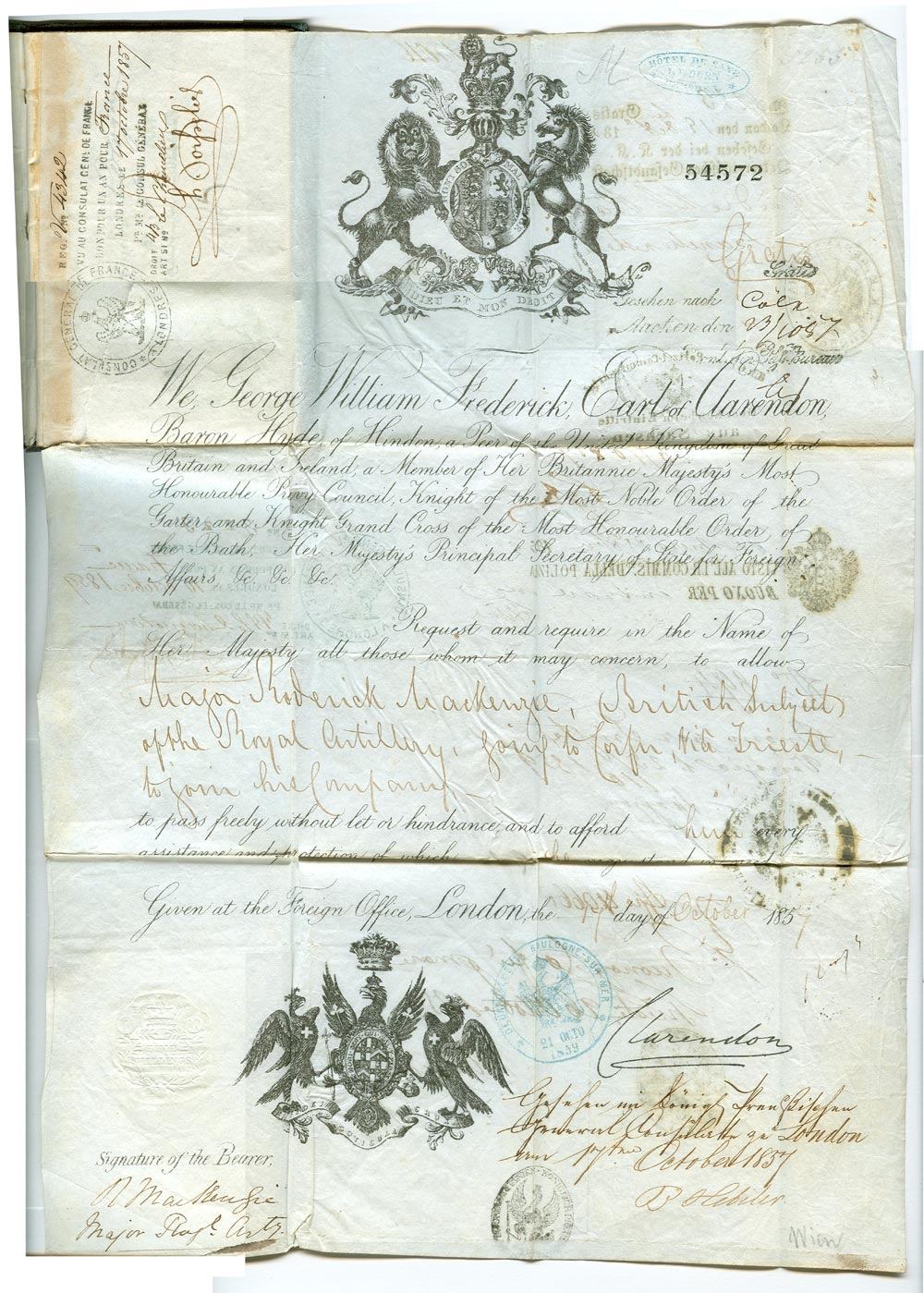
Signed Clarendon Military Passport 1857

Despite what he accounted as "failure" in Ireland, Clarendon continued to enjoy official favour. His services were expressly acknowledged in the Queen's Speech to both Houses of Parliament in September 1848 – this being the first time that any civil servant obtained that honour; and he was made a Knight of the Garter (retaining also the Grand Cross of the Bath by special order) on 23 March 1849.

In January 1853, Clarendon succeeded Lord John Russell as Foreign Secretary in Lord Aberdeen's coalition ministry of Whigs and Peelites, which had been formed the previous December. The country was already "drifting" into the Crimean War, an expression of Clarendon's which became notorious. Clarendon was not responsible for starting the war, but he supported it and maintained close relations with the French Emperor Napoleon III, and the Empress Eugenie, whom he had known in Spain from her childhood. The Tsar Nicholas I had not believed that France and Britain could cooperate successfully against Russia.

When the Crimean War ended in 1856 Lord Clarendon was first British plenipotentiary at the Congress of Paris convened to negotiate a peace treaty, the first time since Lord Castlereagh's attendance at the Congress of Vienna that a British Foreign Secretary had personally attended such a conference. Clarendon's first priority was to ensure that Piedmont-Sardinia was admitted to the conference as an Allied power, but that Prussia, which had remained neutral, should be excluded. Clarendon ensured that the Allies insisted on neutralising the Black Sea and that the Russian attempt to retain South Bessarabia was defeated. The congress was eager to turn to other subjects, and perhaps its most important achievement was the celebrated Declaration of the Maritime Powers, which abolished privateering, defined the right of blockade, and limited the right of capture to enemy property in enemy ships. Clarendon has been accused of abandoning Britain's belligerent rights, which were based on the old maritime laws of Europe. But he acted with the agreement of the British Cabinet, which felt that it was not to Britain's benefit keep to customs which exposed Britain's vast merchant fleet to attack, even by the cruisers of a secondary maritime power, and which, if vigorously enforced against neutrals, would embroil Britain with every maritime state in the world.

When Lord Palmerston formed a Liberal government in 1859, Lord John Russell only agreed to serve if given the Foreign Office, leaving no suitably senior job for Clarendon. From 1861 to 1864, he chaired the Clarendon Commission investigating the state of nine leading schools in England. Clarendon re-entered the cabinet in May 1864 as Chancellor of the Duchy of Lancaster. He served as Foreign Secretary a second time in Russell's second government (1865–66), and for a third time in the early years of Gladstone's government formed in 1868. He died surrounded by the boxes and papers of his office on 27 June 1870.

== Marriage and issue ==
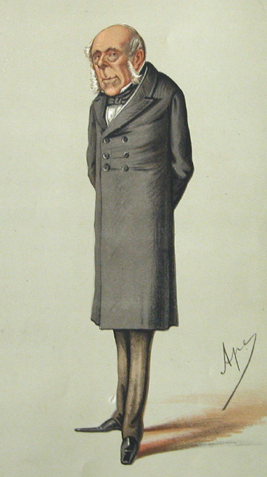
George Villiers, 4th Earl of Clarendon, by Carlo Pellegrini, 1869

On 4 June 1839, Villiers married the widowed Lady Katherine Foster-Barham (a daughter of James Grimston, 1st Earl of Verulam) and they had eight children:

- Lady Constance Villiers (1840–1922), married Frederick Stanley, 16th Earl of Derby
- Lady Alice Villiers (1841–1897), married Edward Bootle-Wilbraham, 1st Earl of Lathom
- Lady Emily Theresa (1843–1927), married Odo Russell, 1st Baron Ampthill
- Edward Hyde, Lord Hyde (30 January 1845 – 26 February 1846), died young
- Edward Villiers, 5th Earl of Clarendon (1846–1914)
- Hon. George Patrick Hyde (27 September 1847 – 10 January 1892), married Louisa Maria Maquay, daughter of George Disney Maquay, on 9 October 1884
- Lady Florence Margaret Villiers (21 September 1850 – 25 August 1851), died in infancy
- Hon. Sir Francis Hyde Villiers (1852–1925), married Virginia Katharine Smith, daughter of Eric Carrington Smith and Mary Maberly, on 28 June 1876

== Notes ==
Political offices
Preceded by Viscount Duncannon	Lord Privy Seal; 1840–1841	Succeeded by The Duke of Buckingham and Chandos
Preceded by The Lord Holland	Chancellor of the Duchy of Lancaster; 1840–1841	Succeeded by Sir George Grey
Preceded by The Lord Holland	President of the Board of Trade; 1846–1847	Succeeded by Henry Labouchere
Preceded by The Earl of Bessborough	Lord Lieutenant of Ireland; 1847–1852	Succeeded by The Earl of Eglinton
Preceded by Lord John Russell	Foreign Secretary; 1853–1858	Succeeded by The Earl of Malmesbury
Preceded by Edward Cardwell	Chancellor of the Duchy of Lancaster; 1864–1865	Succeeded by George Joachim Goschen
Preceded by The Earl Russell	Foreign Secretary; 1865–1866	Succeeded by Lord Stanley
Preceded by Lord Stanley	Foreign Secretary; 1868–1870	Succeeded by The Earl Granville
Peerage of Great Britain
Preceded by John Villiers	Earl of Clarendon; 2nd creation 1838–1870	Succeeded by Edward Villiers
