= Thomas Lister =

Thomas or Tom Lister may refer to:

- Thomas Lister (Jesuit) (c. 1559–c. 1628), English Jesuit writer
- Thomas Lister (regicide) (1597–1668), colonel in the Parliamentary army during the English Civil War, MP for Lincoln, and judge at the trial of Charles I
- Thomas Lister (British politician, born 1658) (1658–1718), member of parliament for Lincoln, 1705–1715
- Thomas Lister (British politician, born 1688) (1688–1745), member of parliament for Clitheroe, 1713–1745
- Thomas Lister (British politician, born 1723) (1723–1761), member of parliament for Clitheroe, 1745–1761, son of the above
- Thomas Lister, 1st Baron Ribblesdale (1752–1826), member of parliament for Clitheroe, 1773–1790, son of the above
- Thomas Lister, 2nd Baron Ribblesdale (1790–1832), English peer, son of the above
- Thomas Henry Lister (1800–1842), British novelist and registrar-general, great-grandson of Thomas Lister (1688–1745)
- Thomas Lister, 3rd Baron Ribblesdale (1828–1876), English peer, son of the 2nd Baron Ribblesdale
- Sir Thomas Villiers Lister (1832–1902), British diplomat, son of Thomas Henry Lister
- Thomas Lister, 4th Baron Ribblesdale (1854–1925), British Liberal politician, son of the 3rd Baron Ribblesdale
- Thomas David Lister (1869–1924), British physician
- Tom Lister (rugby union) (1943–2017), New Zealand rugby union player
- Tommy Lister Jr. (1958–2020), American actor
- Tom Lister (actor) (born 1978), English actor

== See also ==
- Thomas Lester (disambiguation)
