= Beau Brummell =

English man of fashion (1778–1840)

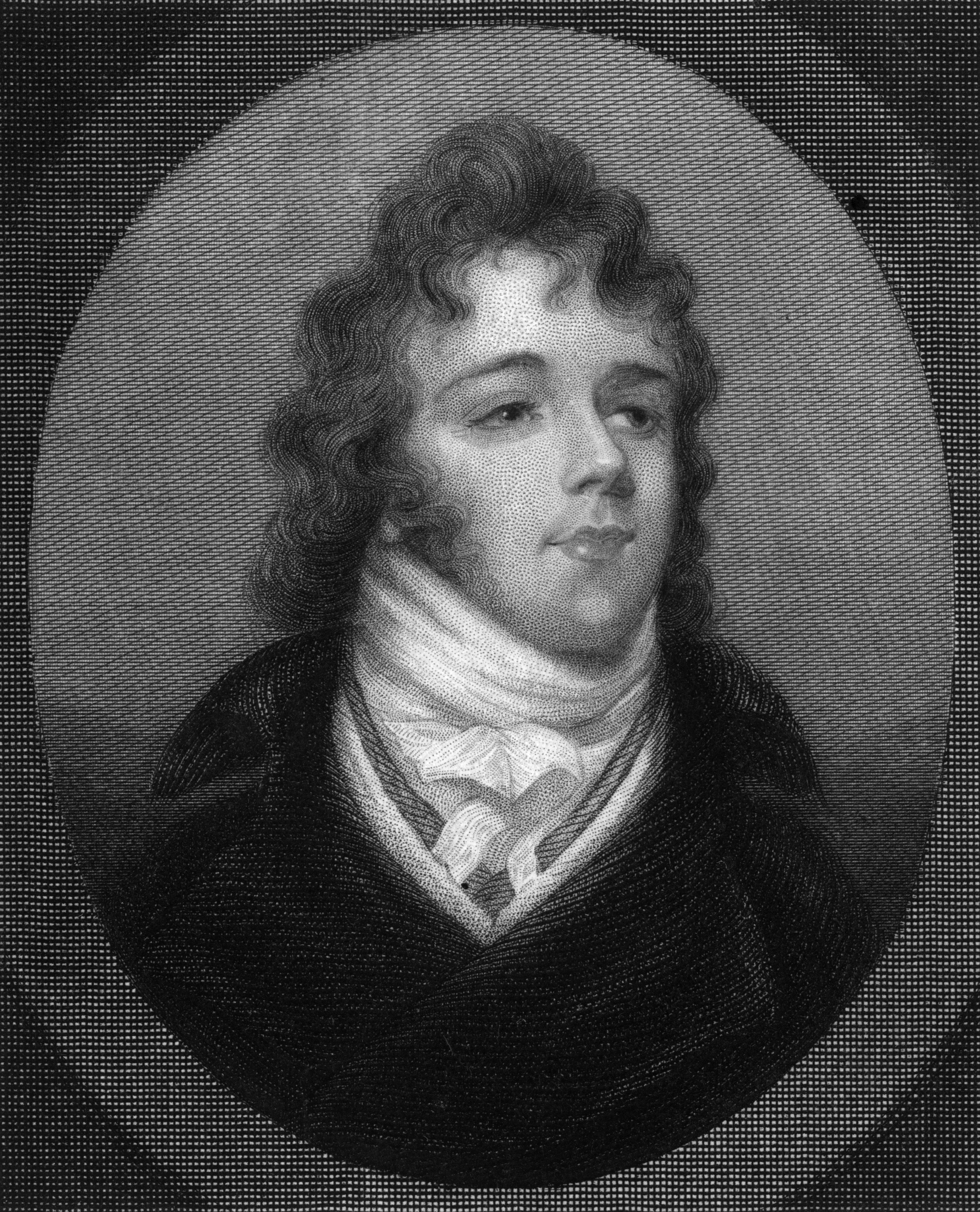
- Brummell, engraved from a miniature portrait
- Born: George Bryan Brummell; 7 June 1778; London, England
- Died: 30 March 1840 (aged 61); Caen, France
- Education: Eton College; Oriel College, Oxford

George Bryan "Beau" Brummell (7 June 1778 – 30 March 1840) was an English socialite who influenced British men's fashion during the Regency era. He was a close friend of the Prince Regent, the future King George IV, but after the two quarrelled and Brummell got into debt, he had to take refuge in France. Eventually, he died from complications of neurosyphilis in Caen.

Brummell was remembered afterwards as the preeminent example of the dandy, and a whole literature was founded upon his manner and witty sayings, which have persisted until today. His name is still associated with style and good looks and has been given to a variety of modern products to suggest their high quality.

== Life ==
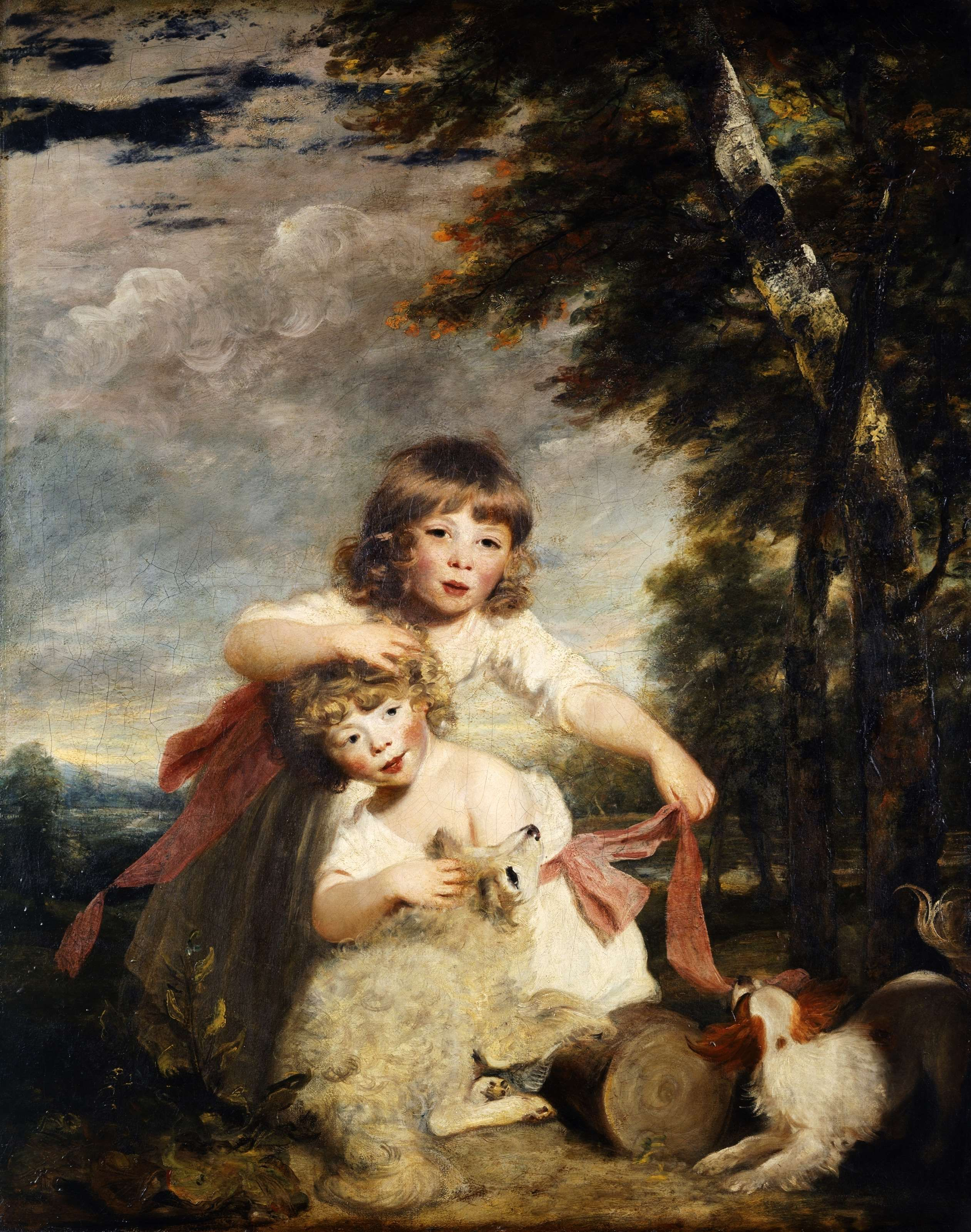
Sir Joshua Reynolds, The Brummel Children, 1780s. George is the younger.

Brummell was born in Downing Street, London, the younger son of William Brummell (d. 1795), Private Secretary to the Prime Minister, Lord North, and Mary (née Richardson, daughter of the Keeper of the Lottery Office). North rated William Brummell highly, procuring for him appointments including those he held at the time of his death, namely Receiver of the Duties on Uninhabited Houses in London and Middlesex, Comptroller of the Hawkers' and Pedlars' Office, and Agent and Paymaster to the out-pensioners of Chelsea Hospital; these gave William about £2,500 per annum. On his retirement from politics, William had bought Donnington Grove in Berkshire and served as High Sheriff of Berkshire in 1788. William was the son of another William Brummell (d. 1770), who had been valet to a Lincolnshire politician, Charles Monson. The elder William Brummell was reckoned "an excellent servant" and met with some success despite his modest origins through patronage and good fortune. He went into business as a confectioner in Bury Street, "in an area notorious for [...] high-class brothels", letting some rooms in the family's house for boarding. The statesman Charles Jenkinson, 1st Earl of Liverpool, stayed there for a time and got the younger William a clerical position at the Treasury, which led to his successful career.

The family had achieved middle class status, but William Brummell was ambitious for his son George to become a gentleman, and he was raised with that understanding. It was suggested (possibly by the Brummells) that William Brummell was an illegitimate descendant of Frederick, Prince of Wales.

Brummell was educated at Eton College and made his precocious mark on fashion when he not only modernised the white stock, or cravat, that was the mark of the "Eton boy", but added a gold buckle to it.

He progressed to Oxford University, where, by his own example, he made cotton stockings and dingy cravats fall out of favour. While an undergraduate at Oriel College in 1793, he competed for the Chancellor's Prize for Latin Verse, coming second to Edward Copleston, who later became provost of his college. He left the university after only a year at age 16.

=== Military career ===
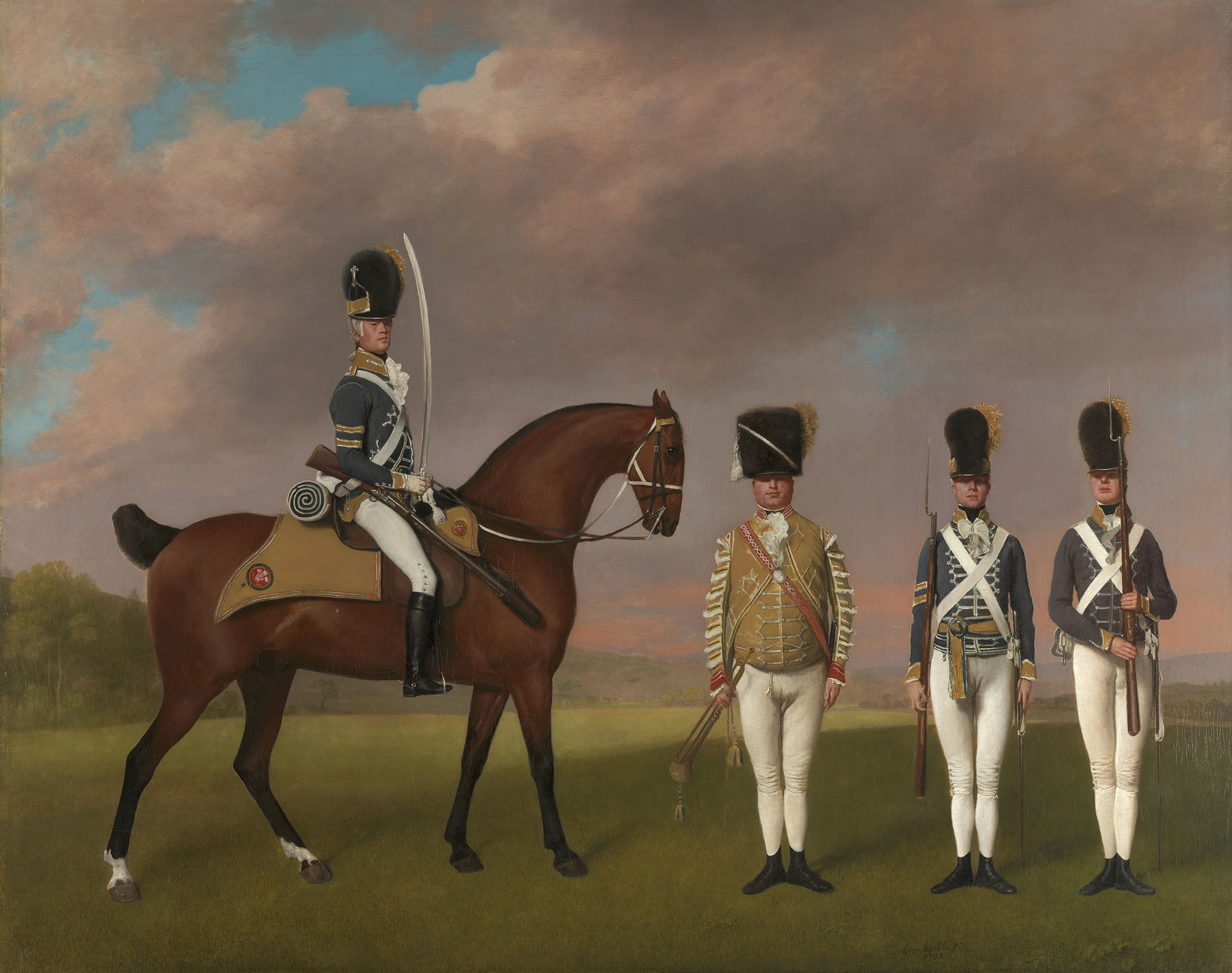
1793 painting of the 10th Light Dragoons, the regiment Brummell served in

In June 1794, Brummell purchased a cornet's commission in the British Army's 10th Light Dragoons, and soon after had his nose broken by a kick from a horse. His father died in 1795, by which time Brummell had been promoted to lieutenant. His father had left him an inheritance of some £30,000. Ordinarily a considerable sum, it was inadequate for the expenses of an aspiring officer in the personal regiment of the Prince of Wales. The regiment's officers, many of whom were heirs to noble titles and lands, "wore their estates upon their backs – some of them before they had inherited the paternal acres." British cavalry officers were all required to pay for their own mounts and uniforms along with mess bills, but the 10th Light Dragoons in particular had elaborate and nearly endless variations of uniform. Their mess expenses were unusually high because the regiment frequently enjoyed banquets and entertainment.

For such a junior officer, Brummell took the regiment by storm, fascinating the Prince of Wales:

"[T]he first gentleman of England", by the force of his personality. He was allowed to miss parade, shirk his duties and, in essence, do just as he pleased. Within three years, by 1796, he was made a captain, to the envy and disgust of older officers who felt that "our general's friend was now the general."

In 1797, when his regiment was sent from London to Manchester, Brummell immediately resigned his commission, citing the city's poor reputation, undistinguished ambience and want of culture and civility.

=== In London society ===
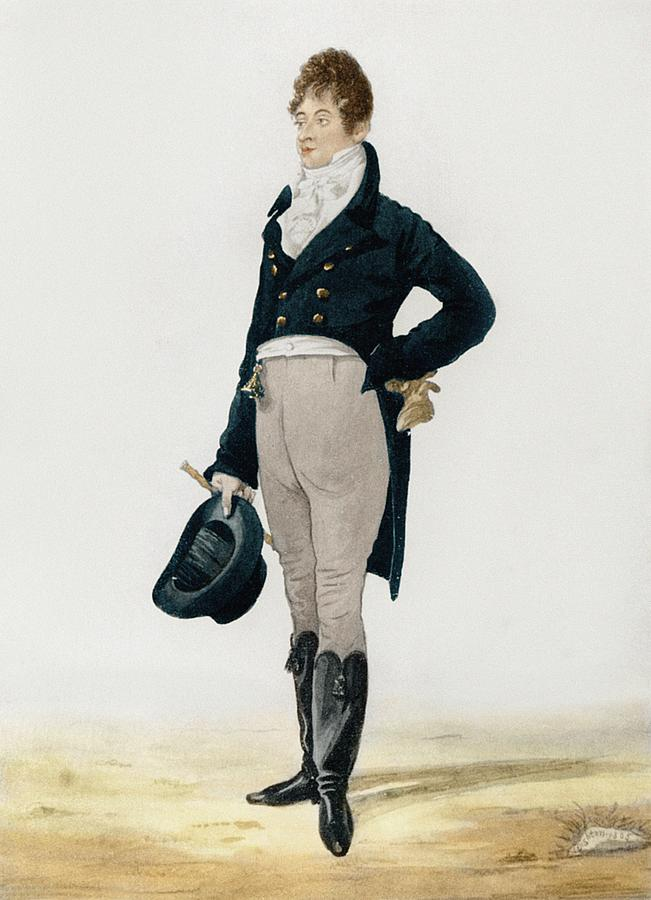
1805 caricature of Brummell by Robert Dighton

Although he was now a civilian, Brummell's friendship with (and influence over) the Prince continued. He became a noted figure in fashion and adopted a habit of dress that rejected overly ornate clothes in favour of understated but perfectly fitted and tailored bespoke garments; this was the moment of the so-called Great Male Renunciation seen across Europe. His daily dress was similar to that of other gentlemen in his time, based upon dark coats and full-length trousers (rather than knee breeches and stockings). It is believed that around this time Brummell and his tailor (whom he shared with the Prince Regent) Jonathan Meyer (later Meyer & Mortimer) of Conduit Street, collaborated to produce what was to become the contemporary trouser – a garment, it is alleged, that Brummell subsequently introduced to London society and that has remained standard gentleman’s attire ever since. Above all, Brummell favoured immaculate shirt linen and an elaborately knotted cravat. This mode of cravat-wearing has been described as Brummell's chief innovation.

Brummell took a house on Chesterfield Street in Mayfair and, for a time, managed to avoid the nightly gaming and other extravagances frequent in such elevated circles. Where he refused to economise was on his dress: when asked how much it would cost to keep a single man in clothes, he was said to have replied: "Why, with tolerable economy, I think it might be done with £800", at a time when the average annual wage for a craftsman was £52. Additionally, he claimed that he took five hours a day to dress and recommended that boots be polished with champagne. This preoccupation with dress, coupled with a nonchalant display of wit, was referred to as dandyism.

Brummell put into practice the principles of harmony of shape and contrast of colours with such a pleasing result that men of superior rank sought his opinion on their own dress:

The Duke of Bedford once did this touching a coat. Brummell examined his Grace with the cool impertinence which was his Grace's due. He turned him about, scanned him with scrutinizing, contemptuous eye, and then taking the lapel between his dainty finger and thumb, he exclaimed in a tone of pitying wonder, "Bedford, do you call this thing a coat?"

His personal habits, such as devoting fastidious attention to cleaning his teeth, shaving, and daily bathing exerted an influence on the ton—the upper echelons of polite society—who began to emulate him. Enthralled, the Prince would spend hours observing Brummell's routine in the latter's dressing room.

In June 1811 he was one of the guests at the Carlton House Fête held to celebrate the beginning of the Regency era.

=== Cricket ===
While studying at Eton, Brummell played for the school's first eleven, although he is said to have once terrified a master there by asserting that he thought cricket was "foolish". He did, however, play a single match for Hampshire at Lord's Old Ground in 1807 against an England XI. Brummell made scores of 23 and 3 on that occasion, leaving him with a career batting average of 13.00.

=== Downfall ===
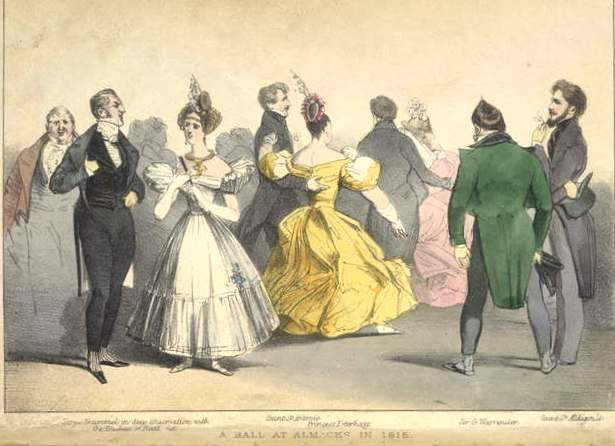
A ball at Almack's, supposedly in 1815; the couple on the left are annotated as "Beau Brummell in deep conversation with the Duchess of Rutland".

Brummell's wealthier friends influenced him; he began spending and gambling as though his fortune was as ample as theirs. He found it increasingly difficult to maintain his lifestyle as his spending continued over time, but his prominent position in society allowed him to float a line of credit. This situation changed in July 1813 at a masquerade ball jointly hosted at Watier's private club by Brummell, Lord Alvanley, Henry Mildmay and Henry Pierrepont. The four may have been the prime movers of Watier's, dubbed "the Dandy Club" by Lord Byron. The Prince Regent greeted Alvanley and Pierrepont at the event, and then "cut" Brummell and Mildmay by staring at their faces without speaking. This provoked Brummell's remark, "Alvanley, who's your fat friend?".

This incident marked the final breach in a rift between Brummell and the Regent that had opened in 1811, when the Prince became Regent and began abandoning all his old Whig friends. Brummell became an anomalous favourite, flourishing without a patron, influencing fashion and courted by a large segment of society.

=== Later life, illness and death ===
In 1816, Brummell, owing thousands of pounds, fled to France to escape debtor's prison. Some sources liberally estimate he owed up to £600,000 at the time. Usually, Brummell's gambling obligations, being "debts of honour", were paid immediately. The one exception to that was his final wager, dated March 1815 in White's betting book, which was marked "not paid, 20th January, 1816". Seemingly unable to quell his urge to spend and gamble, it became apparent his lifestyle could no longer be sustained. Brummell was ostracized from his social circle and soon found refuge in France.

He lived the remainder of his life in French exile, spending ten years in Calais without an official passport, before acquiring an appointment to the consulate at Caen in 1830 through the influence of Lord Alvanley and the Duke of Beaufort. This provided him with a small annuity to fuel his new life in France; however, this lasted only two years because the Foreign Office acted on Brummell's recommendation to abolish the consulate. He had made it in the hope of being appointed to a more remunerative position elsewhere to regain some influence, but no new position was forthcoming, much to his detriment.

Rapidly running out of money and growing increasingly slovenly in his dress, he was forced by his long-unpaid Calais creditors into debtors' prison in 1835. Only through the charitable intervention of his friends in England was he able to secure his release later that year. In 1840, Brummell died aged 61, penniless and demented from syphilis, at Le Bon Sauveur Asylum on the outskirts of Caen. He was buried at Cimetière Protestant, Caen, France.

== In the arts ==
=== Artistic memorials ===
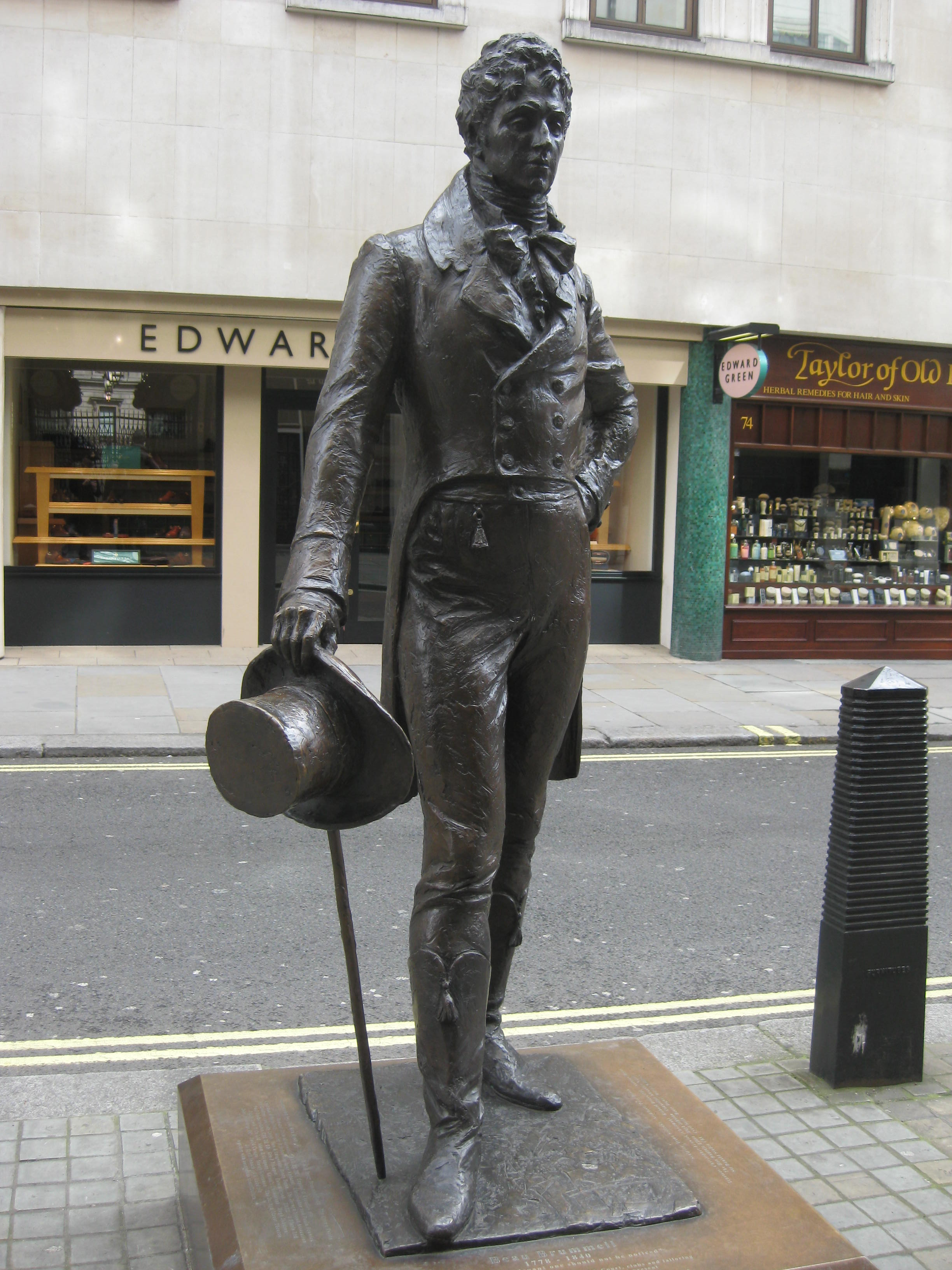
2002 statue of Beau Brummell by Irena Sedlecká in London's Jermyn Street

A very early portrait of Brummell, along with his elder brother William, occurs in the Joshua Reynolds painting of the curly-headed Brummell children, dating from 1781 and now in the Kenwood House collection. The caricaturist Richard Dighton painted a watercolour of Brummell at the elegant height of his dandyism and used it as the basis for a popular print in 1805. Two centuries later, it served as model for a 2002 statue of Brummell by Irena Sedlecká, erected in Jermyn Street. A plaque on the front of this statue is inscribed with his own words: "to be truly elegant, one should not be noticed." On the other side of Piccadilly, a blue plaque has marked Brummell's former home in Chesterfield Street since 1984, while in 2013, another plaque commemorated his name as a member of the hunting and dining club in Melton Mowbray.

=== Brummelliana ===
In literature, Brummell has been more extensively portrayed. Scarcely had he left England than he was satirised as the witty Bellair in the picaresque novel Six Weeks at Long's, by a Late Resident (1817), now ascribed to Eaton Stannard Barrett. Among his humorous remarks there, he is credited with denouncing the eating of vegetables and, when challenged whether he had ever tried it, replying, "Oh, yes, I remember I once ate a pea." A collection of the witticisms ascribed to him and of anecdotes about him under the title Brummelliana was republished many times in the following decades. This began with the story of him enquiring the identity of his companion's "fat friend", and also included his "I once ate a pea" remark. William Hazlitt borrowed the same title, "Brummelliana", for an unsympathetic essay published in 1828, referring to some of these stories and repeating others uncollected there. Dandyism also came under attack in George Robert Wythen Baxter's satirical essay "Kiddyism", published in humorous journals from 1832 onwards, which culminates in a set of satirical aphorisms purporting to be yet more Brummelliana. Further fictitious aphorisms were published in France by Honoré de Balzac in the course of a series of articles published under the title Traité de la vie élégante (1830). These sayings were supposed to have arisen during an interview with Brummell in Boulogne, rather than Calais, and epitomise his view of "the elegant life".

=== Literary portrayals ===
Brummell appears at length in The Memoirs of Harriette Wilson, Written by Herself, (1825) as a former suitor of Harriette Wilson's friend Julia. "In short," she wrote, "his maxims on dress were excellent. Besides this, he was neither uneducated nor deficient. He possessed also a sort of quaint, dry humour, not amounting to anything like wit; indeed, he said nothing which would bear repetition; but his affected manners and little absurdities amused for the moment. Then it became the fashion to court Brummell's society, which was enough to make many seek it who cared not for it; and many more wished to be well with him through fear, for all knew him to be cold, heartless, and satirical."

Two more books were later dedicated to confirming Brummell as a cult figure. In England, there was Captain Jesse's two volume Life of George Brummell (1844), the first biography devoted to him. In France, there was the influential essay of Jules Amédée Barbey d'Aurevilly, "On Dandyism and George Brummell" (1845), which seeks to define the essence of dandyism through a study of his career and opinions. In the course of his essay, Barbey d'Aurevilly deprecates English attempts to portray Brummell in fiction: "Within Brummell's lifetime two well-known authors took up their pen – sharpened to exquisite points and dipped in musk-scented Chinese ink – to cast on blue-tinted paper with silver borders a few facile lines where one catches a glimpse of Brummell." He was referring to two examples of the fashionable or silver fork novel, of which more than a thousand were to be written over the next two decades.

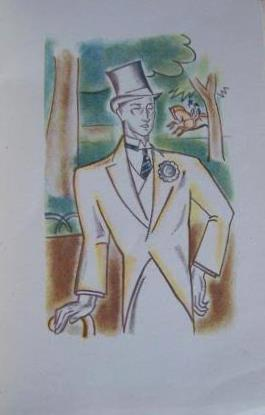
An Art-Deco portrait of Brummell by Paul Welsh, 1930

Brummell's character also served as foundation for depiction of fictional dandies. One such is the character Trebeck in Thomas Henry Lister's Granby (1826), who abandons dandyism when he discovers a waistcoat of his devising worn by "a natty apprentice". In Bulwer Lytton's 1828 novel Pelham, the hero of the title passes through Calais and meets the inspiration of his dandiacal way of life in the character of Mr. Russelton. The latter is modeled on Brummell, and to him are attributed such stories from the Brummell apocrypha as his once needing three tailors to make his gloves and the sartorial insult, "Do you call this a coat?"

Brummell appeared under his own name as a character in Arthur Conan Doyle's 1896 historical novel Rodney Stone. In this, the title character's uncle, Charles Tregellis, is the center of the London fashion world, until Brummell ultimately supplants him. Tregellis's subsequent death from mortification serves as a deus ex machina, in that it resolves Rodney Stone's family poverty.

Georgette Heyer, author of a number of Regency romance novels, included Brummell as a character in her 1935 novel Regency Buck. He is also referred to, or figures as a minor character, in the work of later writers of this genre. More recently, Brummell was made the detective-hero of a series of period mysteries by Californian novelist Rosemary Stevens, starting with Death on a Silver Tray in 2000. These are written as if related by their hero. Yet another American reinterpretation of his character appears in Cecilia Ryan's homoerotic novella The Sartorialist (2012).

=== Stage and cinema ===
In the United States, Brummell's life was dramatised in an 1890 stage play in four acts by Clyde Fitch with Richard Mansfield as Brummell. This in turn was adapted for the 1924 film Beau Brummel, with John Barrymore and Mary Astor. Another play about him, authored by Bertram P Matthews, is only remembered because it had incidental music written for it by Edward Elgar. When it was staged at the Theatre Royal, Birmingham in November 1928, Elgar himself conducted the orchestra on its first night. With the exception of the minuet, Elgar's orchestral score subsequently disappeared and the manuscript has never been located. Brummell's later years were the setting for Ron Hutchinson's 2001 two-character play The Beau (originally Beau Brummell), which, following a UK national tour, played for one month at Theatre Royal Haymarket, starring Peter Bowles as Brummell.

Earlier movies included a 10-minute film by the Vitagraph Company of America (1913), based on a Booth Tarkington story, and Beau Brummell and his Bride, a short comedy made by the Edison Company in the same year. In 1937, there was a radio drama on Lux Radio Theater with Robert Montgomery as Brummell. A further film, Beau Brummell, was made in 1954 with Stewart Granger playing the title role, Peter Ustinov as the Prince of Wales, and Elizabeth Taylor as Lady Patricia Belham. There were also two television dramas: the sixty-minute German So war Herr Brummell (Süddeutscher Rundfunk, 1967) and the UK's Beau Brummell: This Charming Man (2006).

In 1931, there was a French three-act operetta, Brummell, composed by Reynaldo Hahn to a libretto by Rip and Robert Dieudonné. This featured Brummell as the main character in a fabricated story of a rural courtship which saw occasional performance in later years. This was later broadcast by Radio-Lille (1963).

== A guarantee of style ==
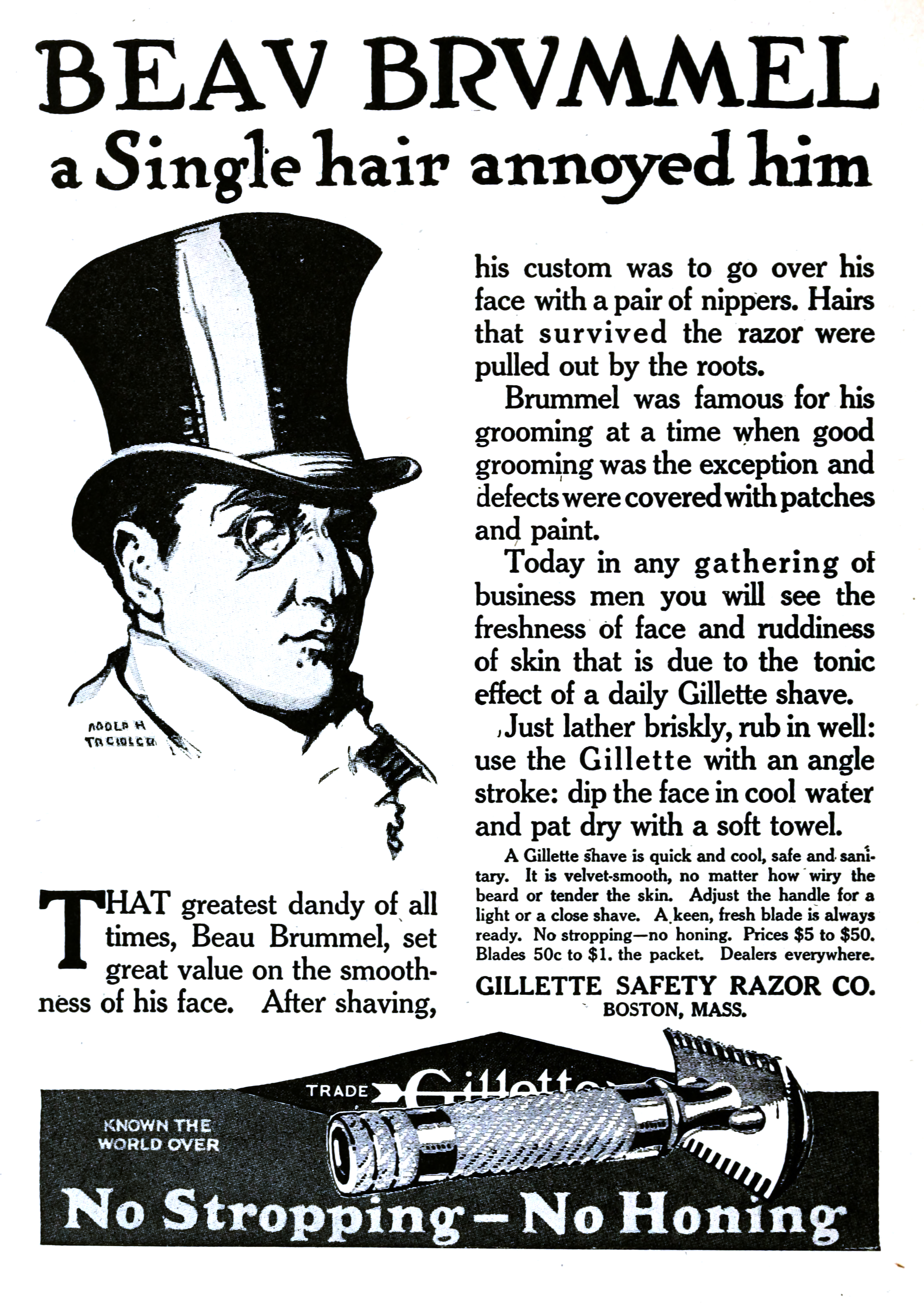
Gillette advertisement (1917)

Brummell's name became associated with style and good looks, and was therefore borrowed for a variety of products or alluded to in songs and poetry. One example was the paint colour Beau Brummel Brown, used exclusively on the 1931 Oldsmobile. In 1934, a rhododendron hybridised by Lionel de Rothschild was named after the dandy. In 1928, there were several Beau Brummel styles from the Illinois Watch Company and in 1948, LeCoultre marketed a Beau Brummel watch with a minimalist design and no numbers.

T. S. Eliot's poem about "Bustopher Jones: The Cat About Town" refers to him as the "Brummell of Cats", an allusion taken up in Andrew Lloyd Webber's Cats, the 1981 musical based on Eliot's Old Possum's Book of Practical Cats (1939). Other allusions to Brummell appear in the lyrics of such songs as "All I Need Is The Girl" from the 1959 musical Gypsy, "You're Never Fully Dressed Without a Smile" from the musical Annie (1977), and Billy Joel's 1980 hit "It's Still Rock and Roll to Me".

Various bands also adopted Brummell's name, beginning with Zack Whyte and His Chocolate Beau Brummels, a jazz-style dance band that toured between 1924 and 1935. During the 1960s, there were the rock bands such as The Beau Brummels from San Francisco and Beau Brummell Esquire and His Noble Men, the name used by South African born Michael Bush for his English group.
