= The Brown Boy =

Painting by Joshua Reynolds

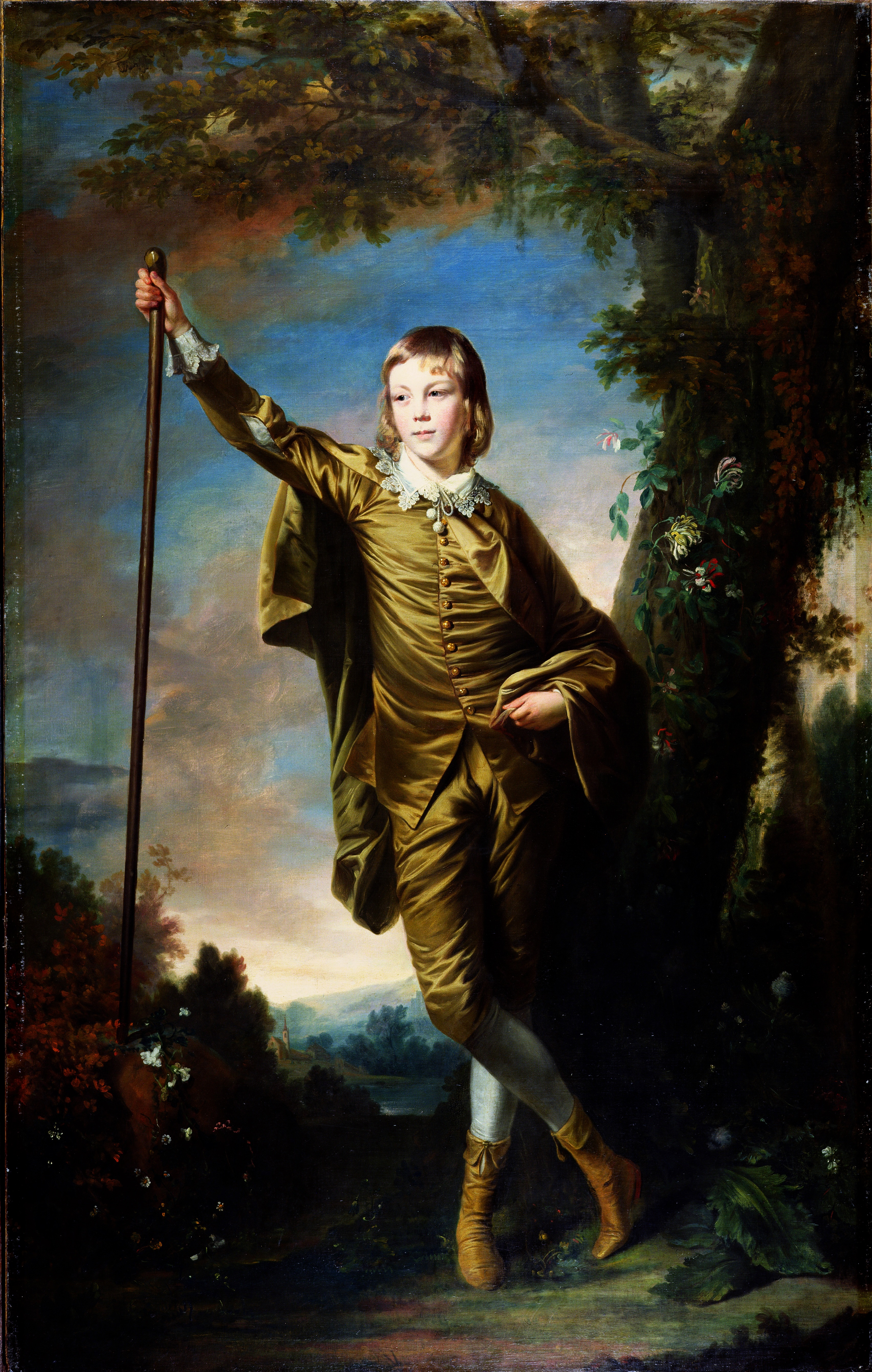
- Artist: Joshua Reynolds
- Year: 1764
- Type: Oil on canvas, portrait painting
- Dimensions: 231 cm × 147.5 cm (91 in × 58.1 in)
- Location: Cartwright Hall, Bradford

The Brown Boy is a 1764 portrait painting by the British artist Joshua Reynolds. Also known as Portrait of Thomas Lister it depicts Thomas Lister a member of a prominent Yorkshire landowning family in a brown velvet suit around the age of twelve. His stance resembles an ancient statue of Mercury. It evokes the style of van Dyck's early seventeenth century portraits. In adulthood he became a politician and was made Lord Ribblesdale in 1797.

The popular title is an allusion to well-known works such as The Blue Boy by Thomas Gainsborough and The Red Boy by Thomas Lawrence. Reynolds was elected the first President of the Royal Academy a few years after producing the work and was very influential on the development of British art. The painting hung at the sitter's country estate Gisburne Park for more than a century. It featured at the Bicentenary Exhibition of the Royal Academy in 1968. In 1976 the picture was accepted in lieu of tax by the British government and now forms part of the collection at Cartwright Hall in Bradford.

== Bibliography ==
- Cumming, Robert. Art. Dorling Kindersley Limited, 2008.
- Lindsay, Jack. Thomas Gainsborough: His Life and Art. Universe Books, 1981.
- Wendorf, Richard. Sir Joshua Reynolds: The Painter in Society. Harvard University Press, 1998.
