= Statue of Beau Brummell =

Statue in London

Coordinates: 51.507758°N 0.138785°W

Beau Brummell
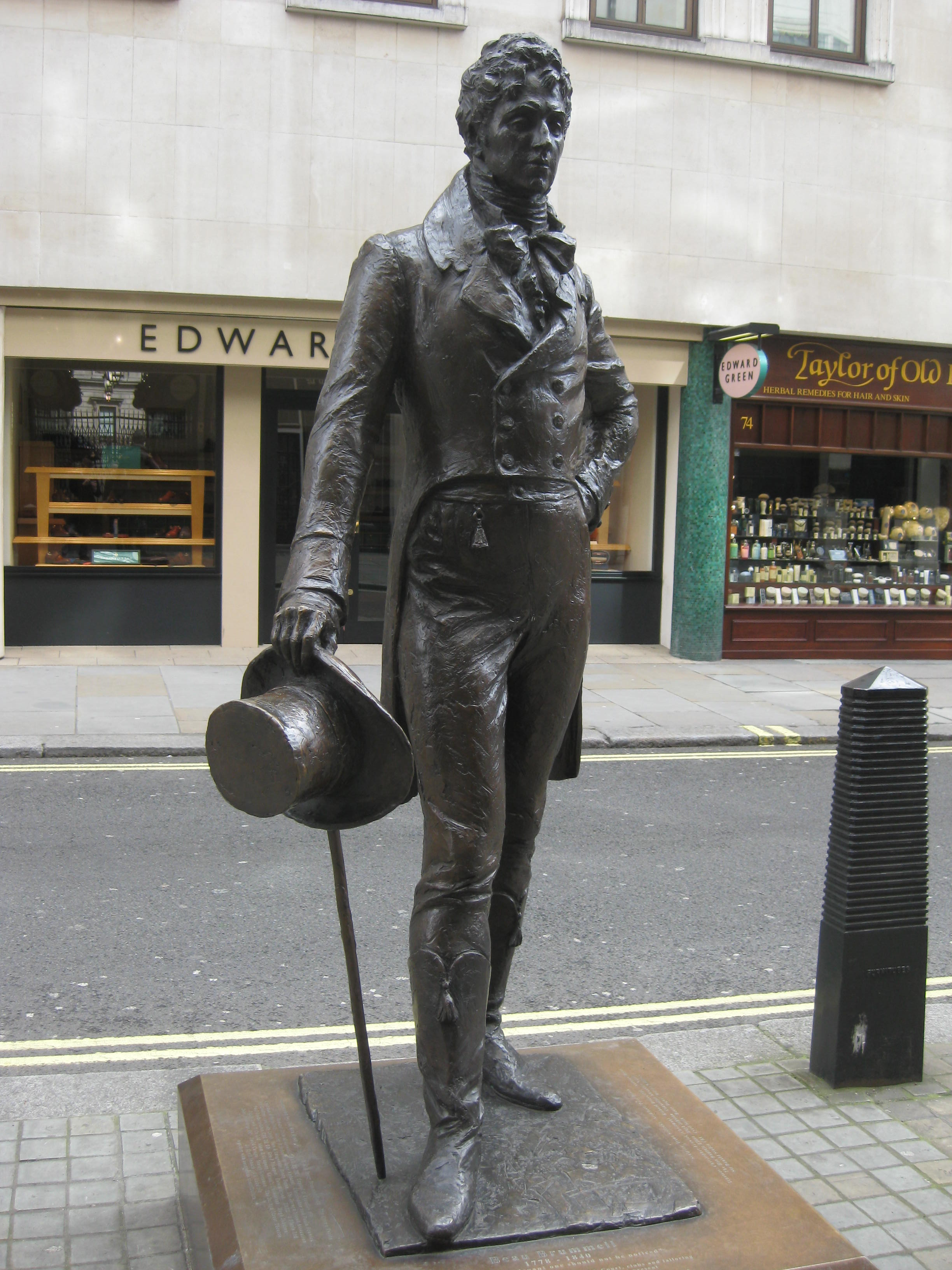
- Artist: Irena Sedlecká
- Completion date: 2002
- Subject: Beau Brummel
- Location: London

A Statue of Beau Brummell by Irena Sediecka stands in Jeremyn Street, outside the southern entrance of Piccadilly Arcade in the St James's area of London.

== History and description ==
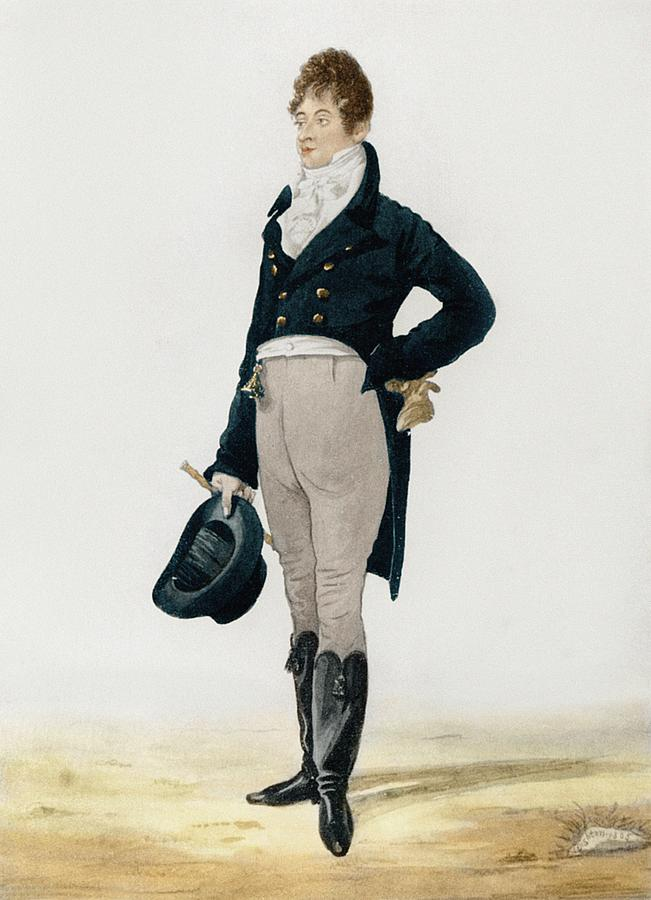
An 1805 print of Brummelll in a similar pose to the statue

George Bryan "Beau" Brummell was a well known proponent of and practiser of "dandyism" inGeorgian London. Considered improper for his frivolity in the Victorian era, his image has been rehabilitated in modern times, with the statue conceived in the early 1990s.

The statue was originally intended for a site on Bond Street. The sculptor Irena Sadlecka had been recommended to the Bond Street Association by the Royal Society of British Sculptors to produce the statue in 1991. The sculpture Allies by Lawrence Holofcener depicting Winston Churchill and Franklin D. Roosevelt on a bench was instead chosen.

By its erection in 1995 however, Sadlecka had already produced a maquette of her statue the previous year. It remained in the possession of Christopher Fenwick, owner of Fenwick and a member of the association. Around 1999, Fenwick proposed the statue be erected on Jeremyn Street collaborating with Alexander Nicoll a Westminster Councillor. The exact location, with Brummell looking down Piccadilly Arcade from the southern end, was suggested by Sir Jocelyn Stevens the chairman of English Heritage.

The statue was unveiled on the 5th of November 2002 by Princess Michael of Kent, a patron of the Jeremyn Street Association. The statue and its base are rendered in bronze. Brummell is depicted in a tailcoat with a cane and his hat in his right hand, and his left hand on his hip.

== See also ==
- 2002 in art
