= Herbert Lacy =

1828 novel

- Author: Thomas Henry Lister
- Language: English
- Genre: Silver Fork
- Publisher: Henry Colburn
- Publication date: 1828
- Publication place: United Kingdom
- Media type: Print

Herbert Lacy is an 1828 novel by the British writer Thomas Henry Lister, originally published in three volumes. It was part of the then-popular genre of silver fork novels depicting life in the high society of late Regency Britain. It was his second novel following Granby (1826). Much of the plot revolves around politics, with the title character elected to Parliament. It also examines the alliance between the aristocracy and growing middle classes Like many of the silver fork novels it was published by Henry Colburn.

== Bibliography ==
- Adburgham, Alison. Silver Fork Society: Fashionable Life and Literature from 1814 to 1840. Faber & Faber, 2012.
- Copeland, Edward. The Silver Fork Novel: Fashionable Fiction in the Age of Reform. Cambridge University Press, 2012.
- Ingleby, Matthew. Nineteenth-Century Fiction and the Production of Bloomsbury: Novel Grounds. Springer, 2018.
- Rosa, Matthew Whiting. The Silver-fork School: Novels of Fashion Preceding Vanity Fair. Columbia University Press, 1936.
