= Thomas Lister, 2nd Baron Ribblesdale =

English Peer of the Realm

The Honourable Thomas Lister, 2nd Baron Ribblesdale
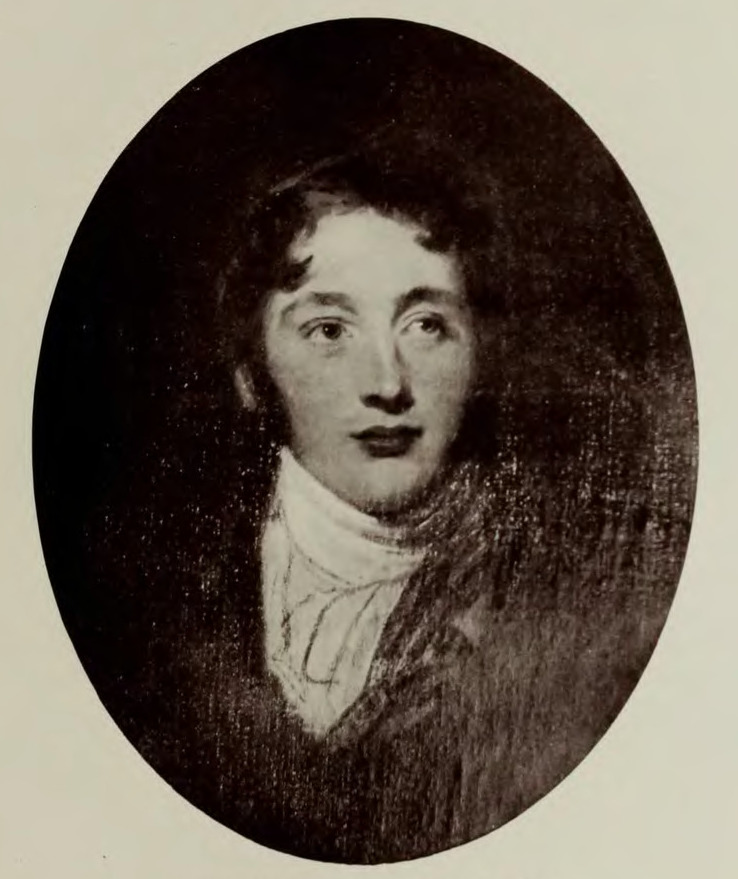
- Portrait by Thomas Lawrence

2nd Baron Ribblesdale
- In office 1826–1832

Personal details
- Born: 23 January 1790
- Died: 10 December 1832 (aged 42) Leamington, UK
- Spouse: Adelaide Lister
- Children: 4, including Thomas
- Parent: Thomas Lister, 1st Baron Ribblesdale (father)
- Education: Christ Church, Oxford

Thomas Lister, 2nd Baron Ribblesdale (23 January 1790 – 10 December 1832) was an English Peer of the Realm.

== Early life and education ==
Lister was born in 1790, the son of Thomas Lister and Rebecca Feilding. His father was created Baron Ribblesdale in 1797. He attended Westminster School from 1800 to 1804 and matriculated at Christ Church, Oxford on 2 November 1807.

== Career ==
Lister succeeded to the barony on 22 September 1826 following the death of his father. He resided at the family estate of Gisburne Park.

In the House of Lords Lister was a supporter of Conservative principles. In October 1831 he voted against the Reform Bill. The result of the vote led to riots across England. Lister had to summon troops from Burnley barracks and arm his own tenants to protect his Gisburne Park estate. In April 1832 he was one of ten peers who had previously voted against the bill but abstained in the subsequent vote.

== Marriage and issue ==
In February 1826, Lister married his second cousin Adelaide, the daughter of Thomas Lister (1772–1828) of Armitage Park, Staffordshire. They had four children, the last of whom was born after his death:

- Hon. Thomas (1828–1876)
- Hon. Adelaide (14 May 1827 – 27 April 1911), married in 1847 Maurice Drummond
- Hon. Isabel Mary (16 October 1830 – 27 July 1918), married in 1853 Rev. Canon William Parsons Warburton, canon of Winchester, cousin of Elliot Warburton
- Hon. Elizabeth Teresa (3 May 1833 – 20 December 1908), married in 1862 Sir William Henry Melvill, son of Sir James Cosmo Melvill

He died suddenly in December 1832 at Leamington following a ruptured blood vessel.

His four-year-old son, Thomas, succeeded to the barony, becoming the youngest Peer of the Realm. His widow, Adelaide, remarried Lord John Russell (later Earl Russell) in 1835; she died in 1838.

Peerage of Great Britain
Preceded by Thomas Lister	Baron Ribblesdale; 1826–1832	Succeeded by Thomas Lister
