= Gisburn Tunnel =

Railway tunnel in Lancashire, England

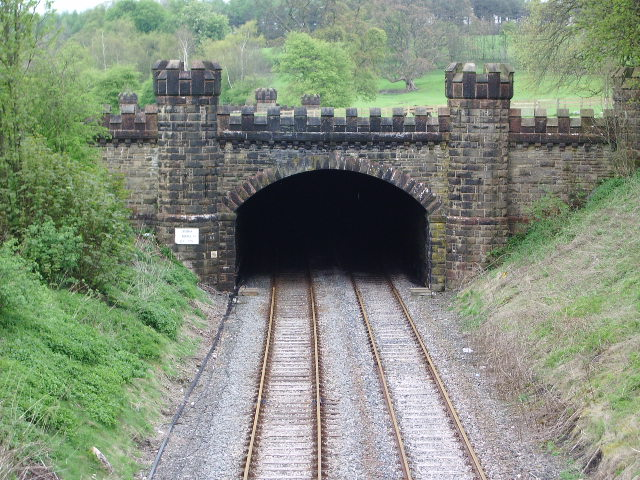
- West entrance to Gisburn Tunnel
- Interactive map of Gisburn Tunnel

Overview
- Other names: Gisburn Park Tunnel; Gisburn Hall Tunnel
- Line: Ribble Valley line
- Location: Gisburn, Lancashire, England
- Coordinates: 53.936°N 2.263°W
- OS grid reference: SD827489

Operation
- Work began: 1876
- Opened: 1880
- Owner: Network Rail
- Traffic: Freight (main); Diversionary traffic (occasional); DalesRail (seasonal)

Technical
- Length: 156 yards (143 m) (7 chains (460 ft; 140 m))
- No. of tracks: 2

Gisburn Tunnel is a short railway tunnel on the Ribble Valley line in Lancashire, England. The tunnel is 157 yards (144 m) long, just to the east of Gisburn railway station, curving slightly under Gisburne Park. The tunnel was reputedly built at the behest of Lord Ribblesdale, who didn't want the railway across his land. The line through the tunnel connects Blackburn, Clitheroe and Hellifield, and is an important railway route for freight trains.

== History ==
The tunnel, which is 157 yards (144 m) long, is sometimes referred to as either Gisburn Park, or Gisburn Hall Tunnel. It was opened to goods traffic in March 1880, when the railway line from Gisburn station (just to the west of the tunnel) was opened to Hellifield. Previous to this, the railway had a temporary terminus in Gisburn railway station. Full opening of the line to passengers occurred on 1 June 1880. The extension of the East Lancashire Railway (by that time, the Lancashire and Yorkshire Railway) needed to go through Lord Ribblesdale's estate (Gisburn Park). Ribblesdale refused to allow the railway to cross his grounds in case it frightened his horses, so a cut-and-cover castellated tunnel was built instead, and the course of the railway was altered from the plans so that the trackbed could not be seen from Gisburne Hall. The castellated entrances to the tunnel were built when Ribblesdale refused the compensation money from the railway company, with Ribblesdale instead asking that the money be spent on the look of the tunnel portals over normal brick edifices.

Various measurements exist for the tunnel - most agree on 157 yards (144 m), however the chain listing shows it to be 7 chains (460 ft; 140 m) long, and a newspaper report from 1880, lists the tunnel as being 154 yards (141 m) long. In 2018, Network Rail undertook a refurbishment programme to restore the stonework on the portals of the tunnel. The project cost £100,000 and was nominated in the 2018 National Railway Heritage Awards. Whilst the tunnel itself is not listed, both portals are (grade II listed), being noted for their use of local stone, with Liverpool red sandstone dressings, and castellated nature with octagonal turrets.

The tunnel is on the Ribble Valley line, some 6 miles (9.7 km) south of Hellifield, and 8 miles (13 km) north of Clitheroe. The line through the tunnel is an important freight artery, and serves as a useful diversionary route when the West Coast Main Line is closed.

== Portal locations ==
- Western portal: 53.936°N 2.264°W - grade II listed.
- Eastern portal: 53.937°N 2.263°W - grade II listed.

== See also ==
- Listed buildings in Gisburn
