= Thomas Lester =

Thomas Lester may refer to:

- Thomas Lester (business) (1791–1867), English merchant
- Tom Lester (1938–2020), American actor and evangelist
- Tom Lester (American football) (1927–2012), American football coach

== See also ==
- Thomas Lister (disambiguation)
