= Lord Ribblesdale (Sargent) =

Painting by John Singer Sargent

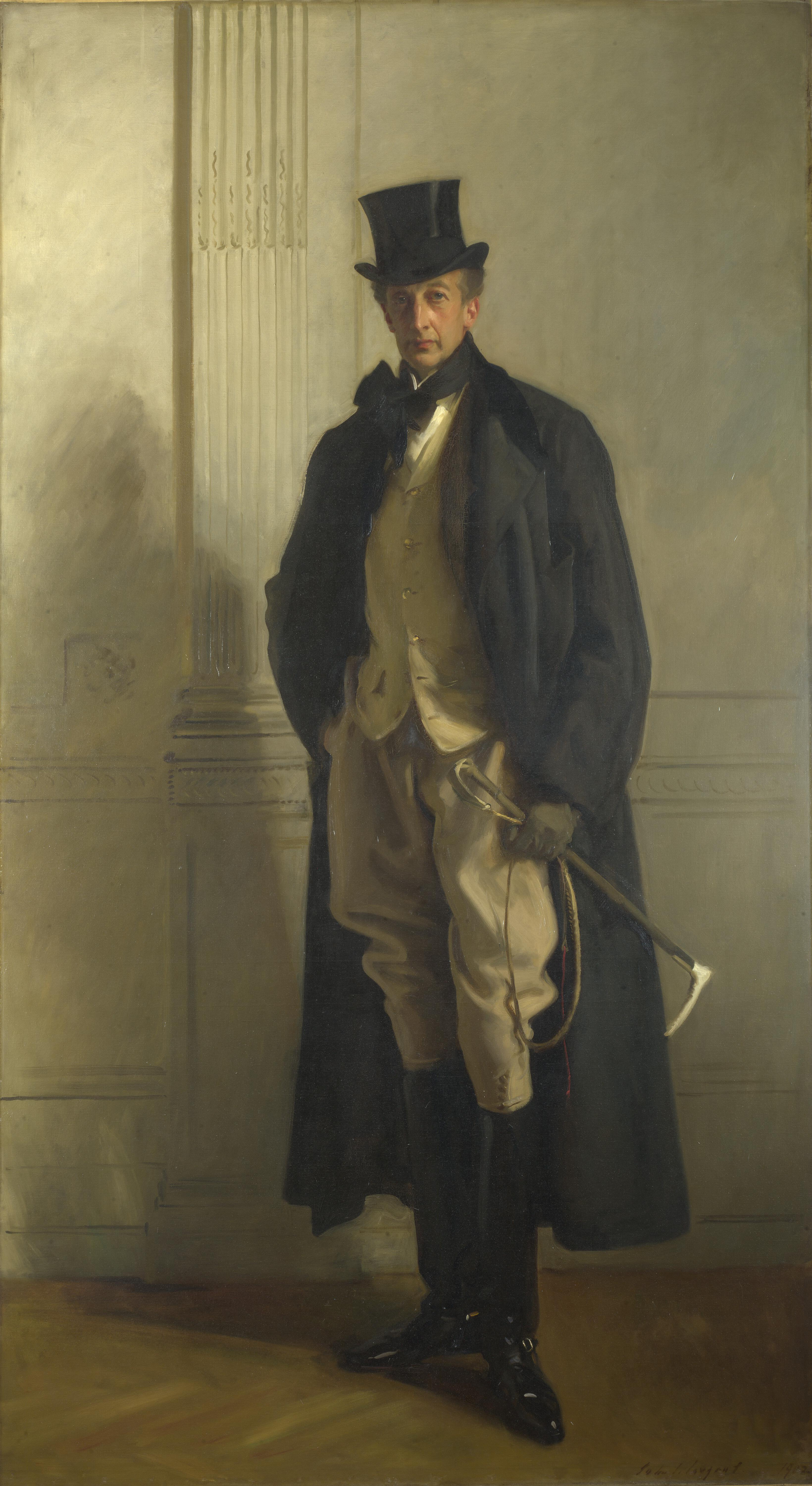
- Artist: John Singer Sargent
- Year: 1902
- Medium: Oil on canvas
- Dimensions: 258.4 cm × 143.5 cm (101.7 in × 56.5 in)
- Location: National Gallery, London
- Accession: NG3044

Lord Ribblesdale, sometimes known as The Ancestor, is a portrait in oils on canvas by John Singer Sargent of Thomas Lister, 4th Baron Ribblesdale, completed in 1902. The full-length portrait depicts Lord Ribblesdale in his hunting clothes. It measures 258.4 cm × 143.5 cm (101.7 in × 56.5 in) and has been held by the National Gallery in London since 1916.

== Background ==
Thomas Lister became the fourth (and last) Baron Ribblesdale on the death of his father in 1876 when he was aged 22. He supported the Liberal Party in the House of Lords, served as a lord-in-waiting at the Royal court, and was a trustee of the National Portrait Gallery and the National Gallery. He was Master of the Queen's Buckhounds from 1892 to 1895.

Although Sargent was already a popular society portraitist, the painting was not commissioned by the sitter. Rather, Sargent saw Ribblesdale speaking in public in 1894, and the artist approached Ribblesdale to propose painting his portrait. However, Sargent did not start the proposed portrait until 1899; he completed it in 1902.

== Description ==
Sargent's original intention was to paint Ribblesdale in formal court livery as Master of the Buckhounds, but the completed painting shows him more informally, in his more practical "ratcatcher" clothes. He stands on a plain parquet floor against a white painted wall, holding a hunting whip in his grey-gloved left hand, with the other hand on his right hip. He is wearing a black top hat, with a black silk muffler knotted to his right side of his neck, and polished black boots. Over his yellow waistcoat, dark brown jacket and buff breeches, Ribblesdale is shrouded by a voluminous black Chesterfield overcoat. The tall hat and the fluted pilaster of the wall behind Ribblesdale, the clear silhouette of his long coat, and subtle changes that Sargent makes to the sitter's physiognomy – such as an elongated nose, and the head disproportionately small in comparison to the body – all emphasise Ribblesdale's thinness and height.

A preliminary oil sketch depicts Ribblesdale standing on steps, before a column, but the final painting has him standing casually before the white panelling of Sargent's studio in Tite Street, Chelsea, London. The composition – a full-length portrait of a man standing in a long Chesterfield coat with hand on hip against a vertically delineated background – echoes Sargent's 1894 painting of W. Graham Robertson, shown with a walking cane against a dark doorway.

The painting was selected by the historian David Starkey as "my favourite painting" in an article published in Country Life in 2015, in which he praises its "angular, elongated format and black-and-white palette, like a super-size Japanese print" as "Capturing the quintessence of understated aristocratic style … the portrait of an age as well as the man."

== History ==
The painting was exhibited at the Royal Academy in 1902, and at the Paris Salon in 1903. Ribblesdale found himself living up to the patrician reputation established by the painting, later saying that it "forced greatness upon me" as "wherever I go, I am recognised". The painting is sometimes known as "The Ancestor", reflecting a soubriquet for Ribblesdale created by Edward VII, on account of the former's archaic speech and dress, and his aristocratic lineage, as exemplifying a typical old-fashioned English gentleman.

Lord Ribblesdale presented the portrait to the National Gallery in 1916, in memory of his first wife Charlotte (née Tennant), and their two sons, Captain Thomas Lister and Lieutenant Charles Lister. Charlotte had died in 1911, Thomas was killed in action in the 1903–04 Dervish War, and Charles died of wounds in 1916 at the Battle of Gallipoli in the First World War. Ribblesdale later remarried, but with no male heir, the barony became extinct on his death in 1925.

== See also ==
- List of works by John Singer Sargent
