= Reginald Lister =

British diplomat

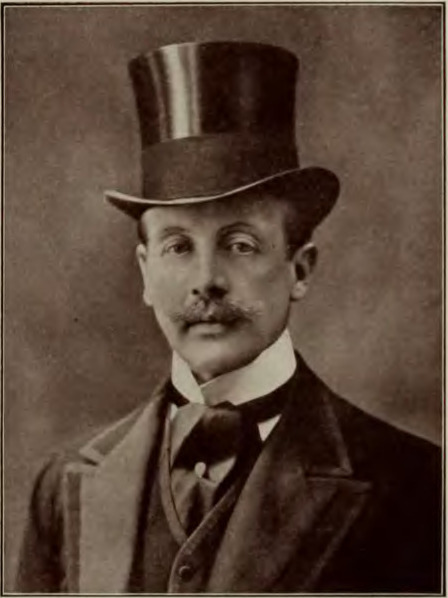
- Born: 19 May 1865
- Died: 10 November 1912 (aged 47); Tangier
- Occupation: Diplomat
- Employer: Foreign Office
- Parent(s): Thomas Lister, 3rd Baron Ribblesdale; Emma Mure
- Awards: Knight Commander of the Order of St Michael and St George; Commander of the Royal Victorian Order
- Position held: ambassador of the United Kingdom to Morocco (1908–1912)

Sir Reginald Lister, KCMG, CVO (1865–1912) was a British diplomat.

Lister was the third son of Thomas Lister, 3rd Baron Ribblesdale.

He was Second secretary at the British Embassy in Paris until September 1902, when he was appointed Secretary of Legation in Copenhagen, Denmark. He transferred to the British embassy in Italy in 1904 with a promotion to Counsellor. He served the same role in Paris under Sir Francis Bertie from 1905. Lister was promoted to a Commander of the Royal Victorian Order (CVO) during King Edward VII′s visit to Paris in 1906, and made a minister the following year.

He left France in 1908 to serve as British Envoy and Minister to the embassy in Morocco, through to 1912.

Diplomatic posts
Preceded by Gerard Lowther	Envoy Extraordinary and Minister Plenipotentiary of the United Kingdom to Morocco; 1908–1912	Succeeded by Morocco under French Protectorate
