= Listed buildings in Gisburn =

Gisburn is a civil parish in Ribble Valley, Lancashire, England. It contains 26 listed buildings that are recorded in the National Heritage List for England. Of these, one is listed at Grade I, the highest of the three grades, two are at Grade II*, the middle grade, and the others are at Grade II, the lowest grade. The parish contains the village of Gisburn and surrounding countryside. The most important building in the parish is the country house Gisburne Park; this and structures associated with it are listed. Many of the other listed buildings are houses (or originated as houses), farmhouses, and farm buildings. The rest of the listed buildings include a church, hotels, public houses, railway tunnel entrances, former dog kennels, bridges, and a milestone.

== Key ==
Grade	Criteria
I	Buildings of exceptional interest, sometimes considered to be internationally important
II*	Particularly important buildings of more than special interest
II	Buildings of national importance and special interest

== Buildings ==
Name and location	Photograph	Date	Notes	Grade
St Mary's Church; 53.93558°N 2.26058°W		Early 16th century (probable)	The church incorporates material from the 12th and 13th centuries. It is in sandstone with a slate roof, and consists of a nave, aisles, a chancel, a south porch, and a west tower. The tower has an embattled parapet and corner pinnacles. Inside the church, the tower arch is round, and is probably Norman.	II*
Stirk House Hotel; 53.92927°N 2.28841°W		Early 17th century	A country house later converted into a hotel. It is in sandstone, and has roofs of slate and stone-slate, with two storeys and attics. On the main front are two gables, with a gabled 2 1/2 storey porch in the centre, and on the left is a narrow gabled tower. To the east is a wing dating probably from the 19th century, and at the rear are modern extensions. All the gables have apex finials, and the windows are mullioned. The inner and outer doorways have moulded surrounds, the outer doorway with an elliptical arch, and the inner doorway a Tudor arch.	II
Ribblesdale Arms Hotel; 53.93523°N 2.26283°W		1635	The public house is in pebbledashed stone with a stone-slate roof in three storeys. On the front is a three-storey gabled porch, with two bays to the left and one to the right. The windows are mullioned, and in the lower two floors contains sashes. In the top floor they have three lights and are stepped. The doorway has a chamfered surround. (Note: Street View in April 2009 shows that the building is no longer in use as a public house.)	II
Snow Hill House and Studio; 53.93504°N 2.26146°W	—	17th century	The building is in stone with a stone-slate roof, and the windows are mullioned. The studio to the left has three storeys with an attic and one bay. The house has two storeys and two bays. The door of the house is approached by external steps and has a timber porch. Both doorways have chamfered surrounds.	II
Gisburn Cotes Hall; 53.92437°N 2.30230°W	—	1659	A stone house with a slate roof, in two storeys. In the centre of the front is a two-storey gabled porch. Some of the windows are sashes, and some are mullioned. The doorway has a chamfered surround. At the rear is a wing dating from about 1800.	II
Offices of Lindley Pate; 53.93478°N 2.26265°W		1674	Originally a house, later converted into an office, it is in stone with a stone-slate roof. There are two storeys and three bays. The windows are mullioned, and the doorway has a chamfered surround and an inscribed lintel.	II
Pimlico House; 53.93489°N 2.26426°W	—	1705	A stone house with sandstone dressings and a stone-slate roof, in two storeys and two bays. The windows are mullioned, and the central doorway has a moulded surround and an inscribed lintel.	II
Great Dudland; 53.91896°N 2.29844°W	—	Early 18th century (possible)	A house in sandstone with a slate roof incorporating earlier material. It has two storeys and two bays with mullioned windows. The doorway has a Tudor arched head and a cornice with dog-tooth decoration. At the rear is a stair window with a semicircular head.	II
Kirk House; 53.93497°N 2.26177°W	—	Early 18th century	A stone house with a stone-slate roof, in two storeys and with a symmetrical two-bay front. The windows have mullions and transoms, and the central doorway has an architrave with a pulvinated frieze and a moulded segmental pediment. Above the door is a blank circular plaque.	II
Gisburne Park; 53.94313°N 2.26737°W		1727–36	A country house, later converted into a hospital. It is pebbledashed with sandstone dressings and has a hipped slate roof. The south face has two storeys and is symmetrical with nine-bays, the central three bays recessed. It contains sash windows, quoins, and a central doorway with Doric pilasters, an entablature, and a frieze with triglyphs. To the west is a former stable block now with a three-bay link to the main house. At the rear are later additions. Inside the house is fine Baroque plasterwork.	I
Mill Bridge Cottage; 53.94197°N 2.27270°W		Early to mid 18th century	A lodge to Gisburne Park in pebbledashed stone with sandstone dressings and a slate roof, in two storeys with an attic. It consists of a three-bay main section with a cross wing at the right. The main section contains two windows in the ground floor and a central doorway with long-and-short jambs, voussoirs, and a keystone. In the cross wing there are mullioned windows, an attic window with a pointed head, and three square finials on the gable. At the rear is a 19th-century extension.	II
Gisburn Bridge; 53.94239°N 2.27296°W		18th century	The bridge carries Gisburn Road over the River Ribble. It is in sandstone, and consists of two segmental arches, with a floodwater arch at the southern end. The bridge has two triangular cutwaters, solid parapets, a string course, and weathered coping. The approaches have curved retaining walls.	II
Poultry House Bridge; 53.94297°N 2.26465°W		Mid 18th century (probable)	The bridge carries Park Road over the Stock Beck, a tributary of the River Ribble. It is in stone, and consists of a single narrow segmental arch. The bridge has solid parapets with chamfered copings.	II
6 Main Street and shop 53.93501°N 2.26246°W	—	Late 18th century	A pair of rendered stone houses with a stone-slate roof, in three storeys and three bays. The doorways and windows have plain surrounds, the windows being sashes.	II
Dog kennels 53.94264°N 2.27181°W	—	Late 18th century (probable)	The kennels were derelict by 1981. They are in limestone with sandstone dressings, and have brick internal walls. The building is in the form of a sham castle with two round towers and a central section with a square plan.	II
The Dower House; 53.93559°N 2.26414°W	—	Late 18th century	A sandstone house with a slate roof and two storeys. On the front are two two-storey canted bay windows containing sash or fixed windows. Above the bay windows, and at the corners of the front are urns. The central doorway has an architrave, consoles, and a moulded pediment. The windows at the rear are mullioned.	II
Gisburn Cotes Farmhouse; 53.92549°N 2.29794°W		Late 18th century	A house, mainly in sandstone, with a stone-slate roof, in two storeys and three bays. The windows have plain surrounds, and most of them have three lights and mullions. On the front is a gabled single-storey porch.	II
The White Bull Public House; 53.93527°N 2.26213°W		Late 18th century	The public house is in pebbledashed stone with a slate roof, and has three storeys and four bays. The windows in the lower two floors are sashes, and those in the top floor are modern. The doorway has a plain surround and a semicircular head.	II
Pair of lodges 53.93623°N 2.26412°W		c. 1800	The lodges flank the entrance of the southern drive to Gisburne Park. They form a mirrored pair, they are in sandstone with slate roofs, and are in Gothic style. Features include pilasters, crocketed gablets, decorated pinnacles, lancet windows, niches containing statues, blank arcades, and doors with Tudor arched heads. The lodges are linked by iron railings to piers that are further linked to a pair of gate piers.	II*
1 Park Road; 53.93531°N 2.26389°W	—	Early 19th century	A stone house with sandstone dressings and a stone-slate roof in two storeys. On the left is a two-storey bow window containing windows with mullions that are either sashes or fixed. The doorway has a plain surround.	II
Barn, Pimlico House; 53.93489°N 2.26409°W	—	Early 19th century (probable)	The barn is in limestone with sandstone dressings, and has a stone-slate roof that is hipped at the right end. It has two storeys and three bays. In the ground floor are three openings with semicircular heads, and in the upper floor is a circular pitching hole. (Note: Street View in April 2009 shows that the barn has been converted for domestic use.)	II
The Priory; 53.93612°N 2.26037°W	—	Early 19th century	A stone house with a hipped slate roof in two storeys. The windows in the main part are sashes, and the doorways have plain surrounds and pointed heads. At the rear is an outshut, and a wing containing mullioned windows.	II
The Grove; 53.93524°N 2.25929°W	—	Early to mid 19th century	A rendered house with a slate roof in two storeys and three bays. The windows are sashes, and the doorway has a reeded timber doorcase with a cornice.	II
East entrance to railway tunnel 53.93699°N 2.26302°W	—	1880	The tunnel entrance is in sandstone and has a single segmental arch. This is flanked by octagonal turrets with loopholes and embattled parapets carried on corbels. Outside these turrets embattled walls lead to an outer pair of similar turrets.	II
West entrance to railway tunnel 53.93637°N 2.26486°W		1880	The tunnel entrance is in sandstone and has a single segmental arch. This is flanked by octagonal turrets with loopholes and embattled parapets carried on corbels. Outside these turrets embattled walls lead to an outer pair of similar turrets.	II
Milestone; 53.92657°N 2.28493°W	—	c. 1900 (probable)	The milestone is in cast iron on a sandstone base. The lower part is triangular, and the upper part is rectangular. The lower part is inscribed with the distances in miles to Skipton and to Clitheroe. The upper part has a rounded top and also carries an inscription.	II

== Notes and references ==
=== Sources ===
- NHS, BMI Gisburne Park Hospital
- Historic England, "Church of St. Mary, Gisburn (1164472)", National Heritage List for England
- Historic England, "Stirk House Hotel, Gisburn (1072104)", National Heritage List for England
- Historic England, "Ribblesdale Arms Hotel, Gisburn (1317787)", National Heritage List for England
- Historic England, "Snow Hill House and Snow Hill Studio, Gisburn (1362320)", National Heritage List for England
- Historic England, "Gisburn Cotes Hall, Gisburn (1362296)", National Heritage List for England
- Historic England, "Offices of Lindley Pate, Gisburn (1362318)", National Heritage List for England
- Historic England, "Pimlico House, Gisburn (1072107)", National Heritage List for England
- Historic England, "Great Dudland, Gisburn (1362316)", National Heritage List for England
- Historic England, "Kirk House, Gisburn (1317753)", National Heritage List for England
- Historic England, "Gisburne Park (1317877)", National Heritage List for England
- Historic England, "Mill Bridge Cottage, Gisburn (1317871)", National Heritage List for England
- Historic England, "Gisburn Bridge (1072106)", National Heritage List for England
- Historic England, "Poultry House Bridge, Gisburn (1164305)", National Heritage List for England
- Historic England, "No. 6 Main Street and shop adjoining to west, Gisburn (1072109)", National Heritage List for England
- Historic England, "Dog Kennels by River Ribble, approximately 90 metres northeast of Gisburn Bridge, Gisburne Park (1072145)", National Heritage List for England
- Historic England, "The Dower House, Gisburn (1362321)", National Heritage List for England
- Historic England, "Gisburn Cotes Farmhouse, Gisburn (1072144)", National Heritage List for England
- Historic England, "The White Bull Public House, Gisburn (1362319)", National Heritage List for England
- Historic England, "Pair of Lodges at southern entrance to Gisburne Park with six stone piers and linking railings and gates (1362297)", National Heritage List for England
- Historic England, "No. 1 Park Road, Gisburn (1317720)", National Heritage List for England
- Historic England, "Barn adjoining to east of Pimlico House, Gisburn (1072108)", National Heritage List for England
- Historic England, "The Priory, Gisburn (1362317)", National Heritage List for England
- Historic England, "The Grove, Gisburn (1072110)", National Heritage List for England
- Historic England, "Tunnel Entrance approximately 180 metres west of A682 in Gisburne Park (1362315)", National Heritage List for England
- Historic England, "Tunnel Entrance approximately 70 metres east of Mill Lane in Gisburne Park (1072103)", National Heritage List for England
- Historic England, "Milestone at SD 81384786, Gisburn (1072105)", National Heritage List for England
- Historic England, Listed Buildings
