= Thomas Lister, 3rd Baron Ribblesdale =

English Peer of the Realm

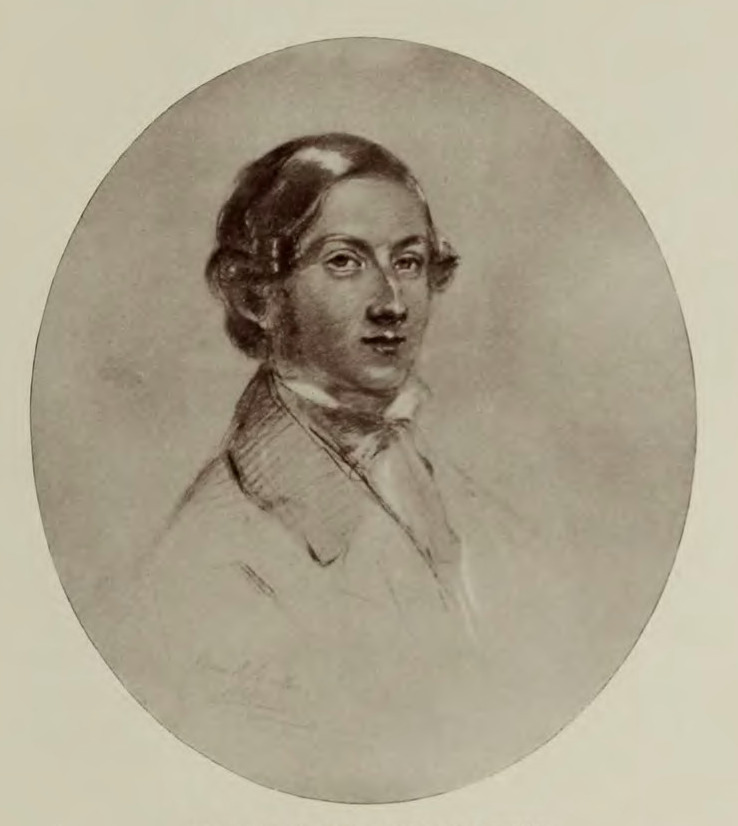

3rd Baron Ribblesdale
- In office 1832–1876

Personal details
- Born: 28 April 1828 Armitage Park, Staffordshire, UK
- Died: 25 August 1876 (aged 48) Leukerbad, Switzerland
- Spouse: Emma Mure
- Children: 5, including Thomas and Reginald
- Parents: Thomas Lister, 2nd Baron Ribblesdale (father); Adelaide Lister (mother)
- Education: Christ Church, Oxford

Military service
- Rank: cornet
- Unit: Royal Regiment of Horse Guards

Thomas Lister, 3rd Baron Ribblesdale (28 April 1828 – 25 August 1876) was an English Peer of the Realm.

Lister was the only son of Thomas Lister, 2nd Baron Ribblesdale and Adelaide, the daughter of Thomas Lister (1772–1828). He was born at Armitage Park, Staffordshire. He succeeded to the barony in 1832 following his father's death: at just four years old he was the youngest Peer of the Realm.

His mother remarried in 1835 to John Russell, 1st Earl Russell (the future Prime Minister); but she died in November 1838 shortly after giving birth. Lister and his sisters lived with Earl Russell and his new wife, Fanny, at 37 Chesham Place, London. Lister mainly received private tuition but did study for a time at Eton. He matriculated at Christ Church, Oxford on 4 June 1846.

In 1849 Lister purchased the rank of cornet in the Royal Regiment of Horse Guards retiring the following year. In 1850 he was appointed Deputy Lieutenant of the West Riding.

Lister was a noted racehorse owner who "may be said to have burst like a meteor on the turf" following his purchase of Jonathan Peel's entire stud in August 1851; this purchase caused his step-father "some anxiety". He raced horses under his own name and that of his trainer William Day. His horses had some success: St. Giles was regarded by his trainer as "about the second best horse of his year", winning the Betting Room Stakes at Doncaster and the Great Northamptonshire Stakes. Lister would bet heavily on his horses against the advice of his trainer.

In May 1853 Lister married Emma Mure, the daughter of Colonel William Mure of Caldwell, Ayrshire. They had five children: Thomas, Beatrix, Martin, Adelaide, and Reginald. The family lived in France for a time, "a method of reconstruction often adopted in those days by families and single gentlemen who had ... galloped themselves out of their fortunes".

Lister committed suicide in 1876 while staying at Leukerbad, Switzerland "having fallen on hard times due to his indulgence in racing." He was succeeded in the barony by his son Thomas.

Peerage of Great Britain
| Preceded by Thomas Lister | Baron Ribblesdale; 1832–1876 | Succeeded by Thomas Lister |
