= Irena Sedlecká =

Czech sculptor (1928–2020)

- Born: 7 September 1928; Plzeň, Czechoslovakia
- Died: 4 August 2020 (aged 91); London, England
- Known for: Sculpture
- Movement: Modern sculpture, Modernism
- Spouse: Franta Belsky (m. 1996; died 2000)

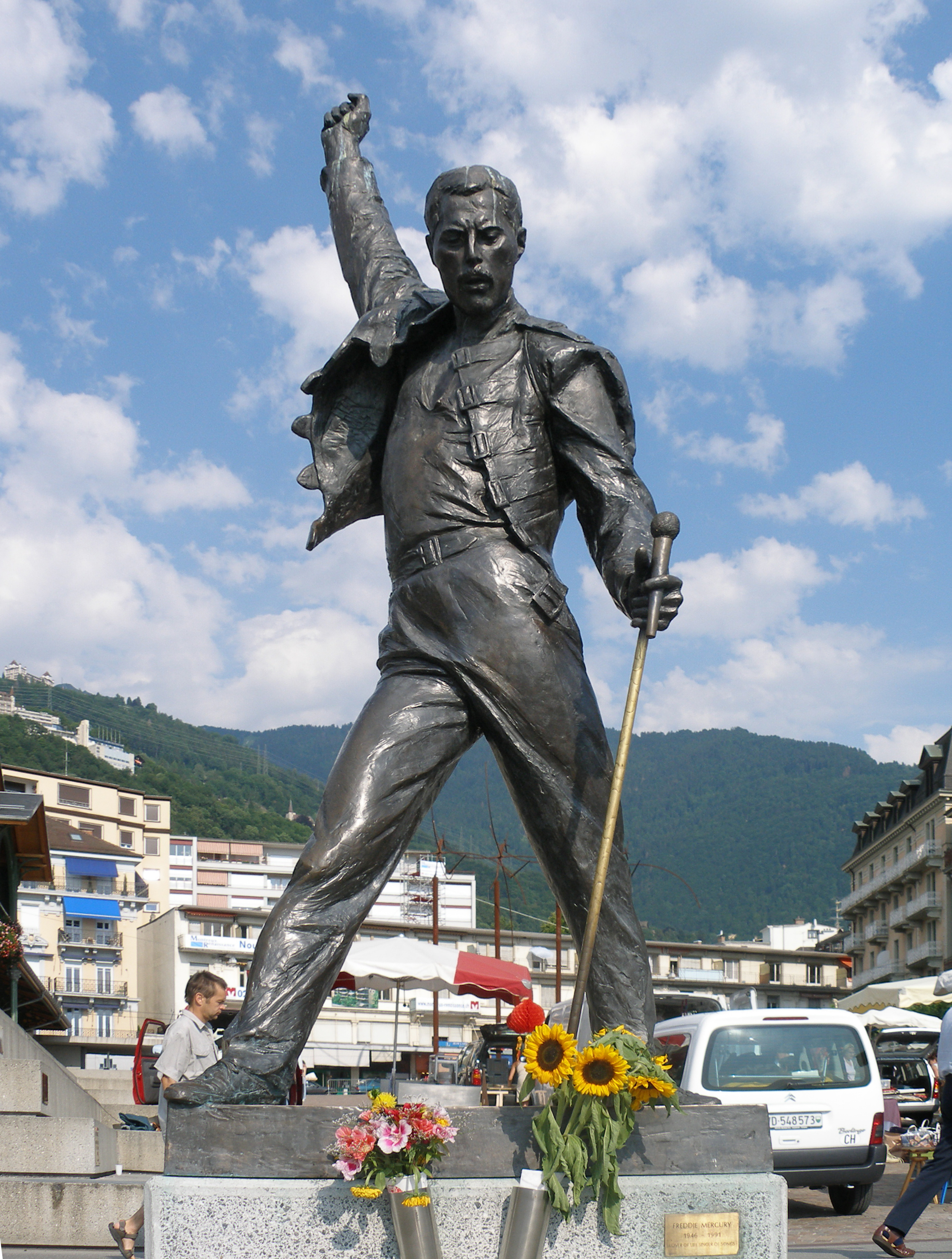
The statue of Freddie Mercury in Montreux.

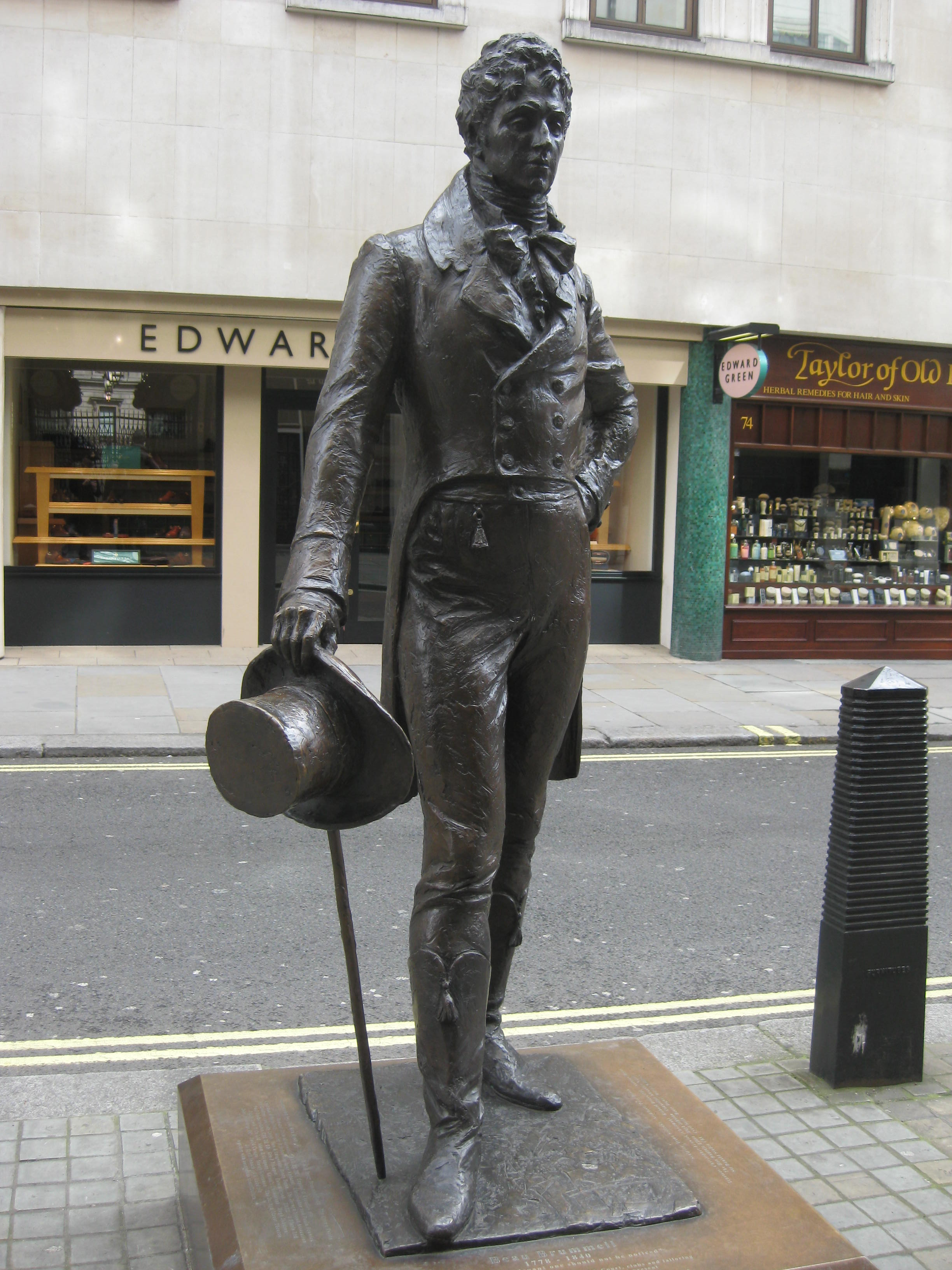
Beau Brummell statue in Jermyn Street, London.

Irena Sedlecká (7 September 1928 – 4 August 2020) was a Czech sculptor and Fellow of the Royal British Society of Sculptors.

Sedlecká was born in Plzeň, Czechoslovakia. After training at the Academy of Fine Arts in Prague, she was awarded the Lenin Prize for sculpture before fleeing the communist regime in 1967. She visited Chile where a sympathetic socialist government led by Salvador Allende was in power.

She escaped from Prague in 1967 with her doctor husband and her three children. They travelled in an old battered car to Yugoslavia, on the pretence of a camping holiday. They only had passports for themselves; the children were not included on them. Through a fortunate coincidence, an Italian couple, who were travelling alone but had three of their children included on their passports, took pity on the couple's predicament, and offered to follow them through the border to Italy, bringing the three children in as their own. Reunited with the children, they travelled through Italy and crossed into France. Sedlecká spent months in Paris alone with the children, staying with very generous friends, while her husband journeyed on alone to Britain to attempt to make entry arrangements for them all. They were finally granted the necessary visas to enable them to settle in Britain.

Her first private commission in Britain, in 1975, was from Kathleen Hunt of Walthamstow, for a 70 cm resin statue of the Virgin Mary and the baby Jesus (The Madonna). She sculpted many monumental portraits and busts since, including Freddie Mercury of Queen, now in Montreux, Switzerland; Beau Brummell in Piccadilly, London, and many in private collections. (Her statue of Mercury served as a model for the large illuminated statue that used to dominate the front of the Dominion Theatre in London during the 12 year run of the musical We Will Rock You.)

Commissioned portrait heads include Laurence Olivier (she also modeled the huge head used for his appearance in Dave Clark's musical Time at the Dominion Theatre), Donald Sinden, Paul Eddington, Richard Briers, Jimmy Edwards, Ted Moult, Bobby Charlton, Lord Litchfield and Sir Frank Whittle. In August 1992 her work was shown at the Czech Embassy in London as part of an exhibition devoted to the work of five distinguished Czech émigré sculptors.

She was married several times, lastly to the sculptor Franta Belsky, who died in 2000.

In late 2010, visual artist Aleksandra Mir befriended Sedlecká. A series of interviews in the following spring led to the publication of a monograph on Sedlecká's life and work together with an unsolicited proposal of bringing the statue, now exiled in Montreux, back to London on temporary loan and to place it on the fourth plinth in Trafalgar Square.

Sedlecká died in London on 4 August 2020, aged 91.
