= Thomas Lister, 1st Baron Ribblesdale =

British landowner, MP and Peer (1752–1826)

The Right Honourable The Lord Ribblesdale
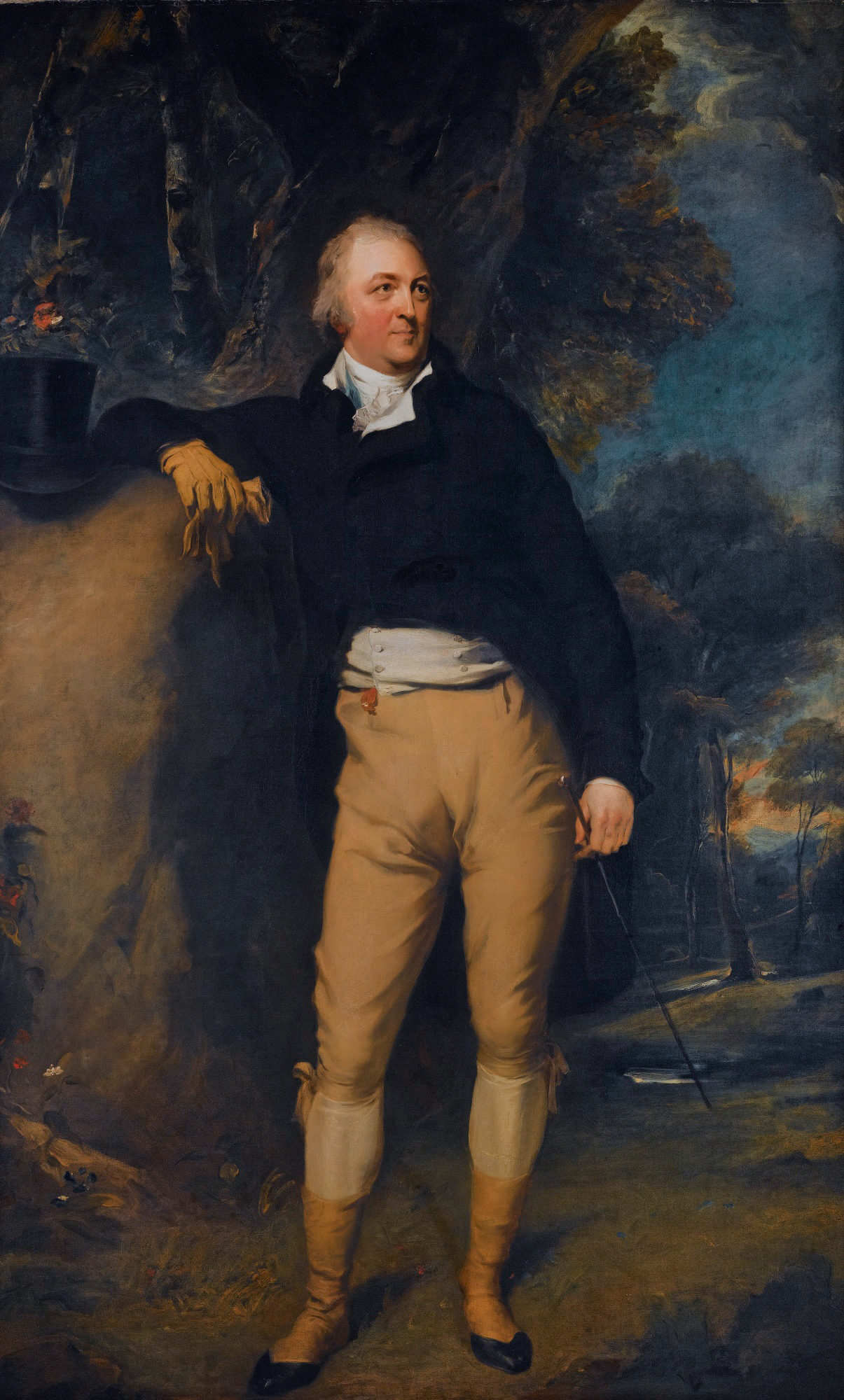
- Portrait by Thomas Lawrence (c.1805)

Member of Parliament for Clitheroe
- In office 1773–1790
- Preceded by: Nathaniel Lister
- Succeeded by: Sir John Aubrey, Bt

Personal details
- Born: March 22, 1752 Gisburne Park, Yorkshire
- Died: September 22, 1826 (aged 74)
- Spouse: Rebecca Feilding
- Children: 2, including: Thomas Lister, 2nd Lord Ribblesdale
- Relatives: Thomas Lister (grandfather)
- Education: Westminster School; Brasenose College, Oxford (MA)
- Occupation: Politician
- Military career
- Allegiance: United Kingdom
- Branch: British Army
- Service years: 1779
- Rank: Major (1779); Colonel (1790)
- Commands: Lister's Light Dragoons; Craven Regiment of Yeoman Cavalry (1790–1826)

Thomas Lister, 1st Baron Ribblesdale (22 March 1752 – 22 September 1826) of Gisburne Park, Yorkshire, was a British landowner and politician who represented Clitheroe in the House of Commons between 1773 and 1790 and was raised to the peerage as Baron Ribblesdale in 1797. At the age of twelve he sat for the noted portrait The Brown Boy by Joshua Reynolds.

== Early life ==
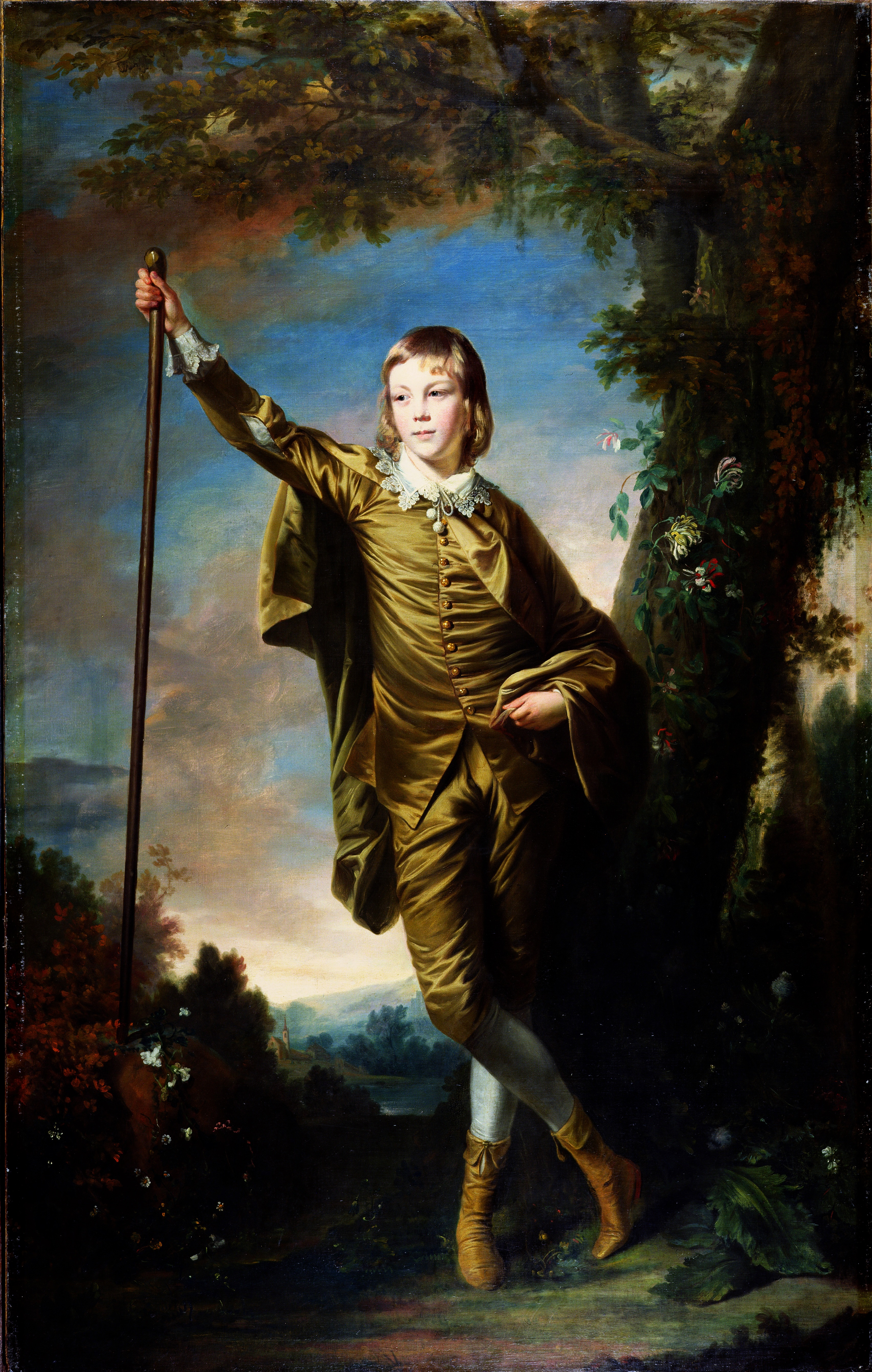
The Brown Boy by Joshua Reynolds, 1764

Lister was born on 22 March 1752, the son of Thomas Lister (1723–61) of Gisburne Park, Yorkshire, and his wife Beatrix Hulton. His father was MP for Clitheroe from 1745 to 1761. He was educated at Westminster School and matriculated at Brasenose College, Oxford on 2 May 1769, aged 17. He gained the MA (an academic rank and not a postgraduate qualification - the BA is converted into an MA) on 26 June 1772, and later a DCL on 8 July 1773.

== Career ==
In 1773, he was elected Member of Parliament for Clitheroe and retained the seat in the 1774 General Election. When the American war broke out, he fitted out a frigate at his own expense and placed it at the disposal of the Government. In 1779 he raised Lister's Light Dragoons, a regiment of horse and was gazetted major in the army. He was re-elected to parliament for Clitheroe in 1780 and 1784.

He was pricked as High Sheriff of Yorkshire in 1794–5. He was created Baron Ribblesdale, of Gisburne Park, Yorkshire on 28 October 1797.

== Marriage and issue ==
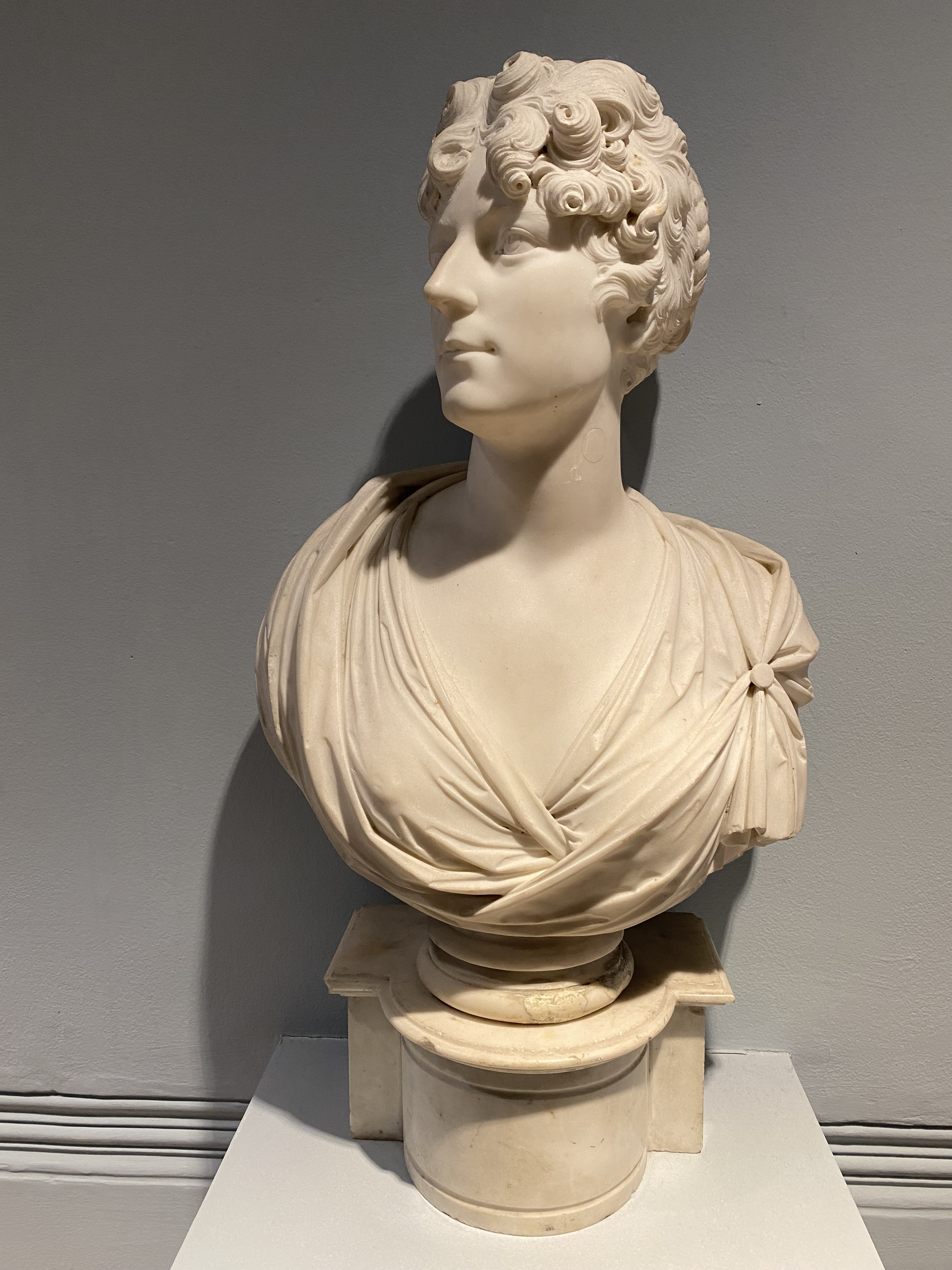
Bust of Lady Ribblesdale in her early 30s (1804) by John Bacon, York Art Gallery

Lister married Rebecca Feilding, daughter of Joseph Feilding, on 7 November 1789 at St James the Less, Thorndike Street, Pimlico, London. They had one son and two daughters:

- Thomas Lister, 2nd Baron Ribblesdale (1790–1832), succeeded his father
- Hon. Catherine (23 December 1793 - 10 October 1873), married firstly in 1810 Samuel Skurray Day (died 1816); married secondly 1817 her cousin Rev. John Fleming Parker; married thirdly in 1864 Rev. Willoughby John Edward Rooke
- Hon. Rebecca Adelaide (31 August 1800 – 5 December 1867), died unmarried

Lady Ribblesdale died in 1817. He died on 22 September 1826 at age 74 and was succeeded in the barony by his only son.

== Arms ==
Coat of arms of Thomas Lister, 1st Baron Ribblesdale
Crest A stag’s head erased per fess Proper and Gules attired Or differenced with a crescent. Escutcheon Ermine on a fess Sable three mullets Or. Supporters Dexter a stag regardant Sable attired and hoofed Or charged on the body with an eagle displayed of the last gorged with a collar of SS and portcullises Gold; sinister a bay horse bridled saddled and supporting a staff Proper headed Or with a banner Vert fringed and charged with the letters Y. L. D. Gold meaning York light-dragoons. Motto Retinens Vestigia Famae

Parliament of Great Britain
Preceded by Nathaniel Lister; Assheton Curzon	Member of Parliament for Clitheroe; 1773–1790; With: Assheton Curzon; John Parker; John Lee	Succeeded by Sir John Aubrey, Bt; Penn Curzon
Honorary titles
Preceded by Richard Henry Beaumont	High Sheriff of Yorkshire; 1794–95	Succeeded by Mark Masterman-Sykes
Peerage of Great Britain
New creation	Baron Ribblesdale; 1797–1826	Succeeded by Thomas Lister, 2nd Baron Ribblesdale
