= Thomas David Lister =

Thomas David Lister CBE FRCS (30 January 1869 – 30 July 1924) was a British physician, surgeon, paediatrician, and expert on tuberculosis and the medical aspects of life assurance.

Lister was born in London, the son of Francis Wilson Lister and his wife Elizabeth (née Wishart). He was educated at Haberdashers' Aske's Boys' School and trained as a doctor at Guy's Hospital, graduating Doctor of Medicine (MD) in 1894. He became a Fellow of the Royal College of Surgeons (FRCS) the same year, and a Member of the Royal College of Physicians (MRCP) in 1900. He worked as house surgeon at Guy's from 1893 to 1894 and pathologist at the East London Hospital for Children from 1897 to 1900. He later became physician to the Mount Vernon Hospital for Consumption and the Royal Waterloo Hospital for Children. He was consulting physician for chest cases to the Prince of Wales' Hospital for Officers from 1917 to 1919 and as a member of and honorary advisory physician to the council of the National Association for Establishment and Maintenance of Sanatoria for Workers suffering from Tuberculosis was responsible for drawing up the plans for Benenden Sanatorium.

Lister was appointed Commander of the Order of the British Empire (CBE) in January 1920 for his work in the First World War. He married Louise Edna Bertha Ritter.
