= Baron Ribblesdale =

Barony in the Peerage of Great Britain

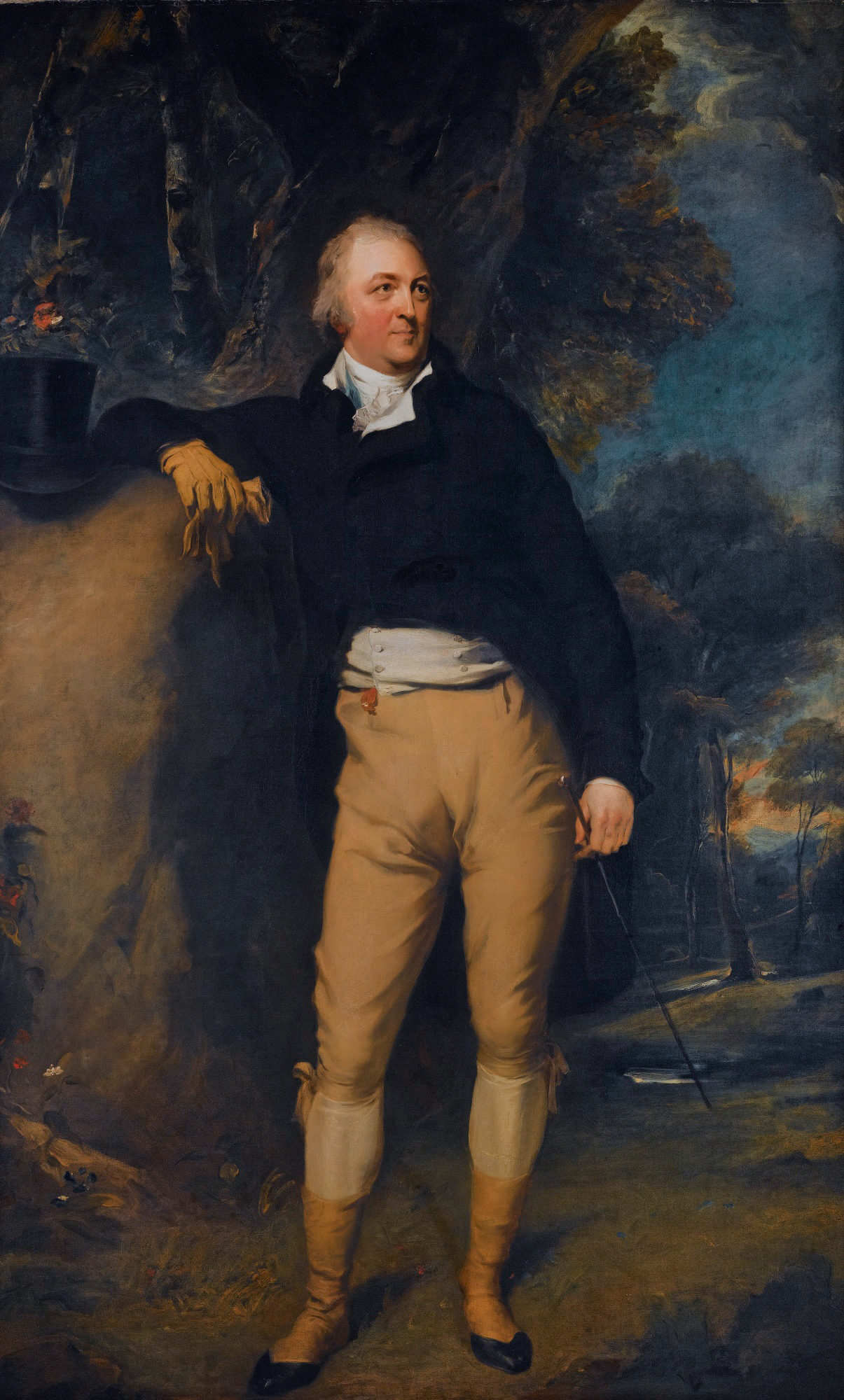
Thomas Lister, 1st Baron Ribblesdale (Thomas Lawrence, circa 1805)

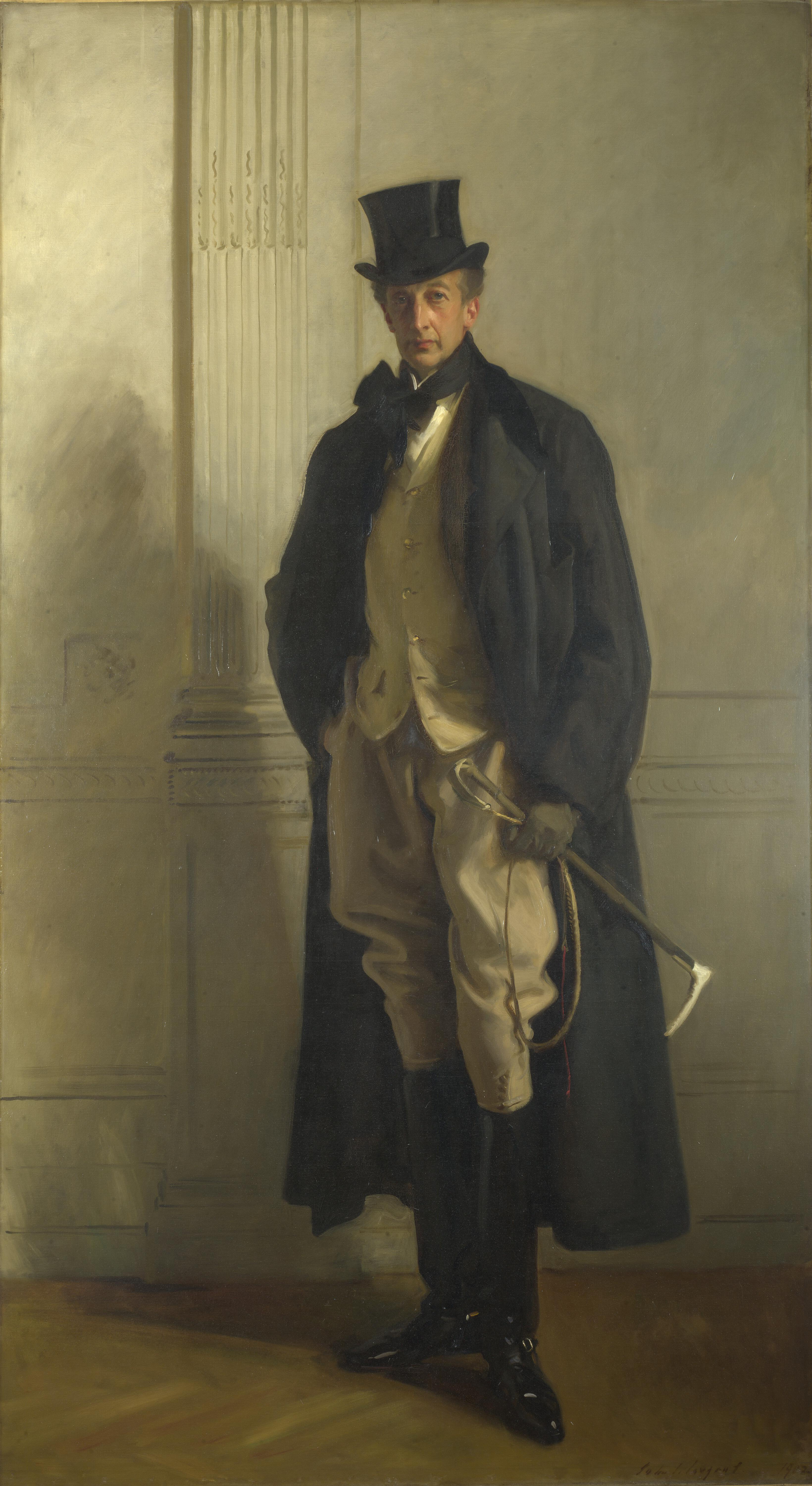
John Singer Sargent, Lord Ribblesdale, 1902, oil on canvas, National Gallery, London

Baron Ribblesdale, of Gisburne Park in the County of York, was a title in the Peerage of Great Britain.

== History ==
It was created on 26 October 1797 for Thomas Lister, the former Member of Parliament for Clitheroe. His great-grandson (the title having descended from father to son), the fourth Baron, was a Liberal politician and served as Master of the Buckhounds from 1892 to 1895. He had no surviving male issue (both his sons were killed in action) and on his death on 21 October 1925 the barony became extinct. Gisburne Park was sold after the death of his sisters.

The first Baron's father, Thomas Lister, grandfather, Thomas Lister, and uncle, Nathaniel Lister (of Armitage Park, Staffordshire), also represented Clitheroe in the House of Commons. The latter's grandson, Thomas Henry Lister, was a novelist and Registrar General. Sir Reginald Lister (1865–1912), third son of the third Baron, was a diplomat.

== Ancestors ==
- Thomas Lister (1688–1745), Member of Parliament for Clitheroe 1710–1745
- Thomas Lister (1723–1761), son of the above, Member of Parliament for Clitheroe 1745–1761

== Barons Ribblesdale (1797) ==
- Thomas Lister, 1st Baron Ribblesdale (1752–1826)
- Thomas Lister, 2nd Baron Ribblesdale (1790–1832)
- Thomas Lister, 3rd Baron Ribblesdale (1828–1876)
- Thomas Lister, 4th Baron Ribblesdale (1854–1925)
  - Capt. Thomas Lister (1878–1904 †)
  - 2nd Lt. Charles Alfred Lister (1887–1915 (DOW))

== Arms ==
Coat of arms of Baron Ribblesdale
Crest A stag’s head erased per fess Proper and Gules attired Or differenced with a crescent. Escutcheon Ermine on a fess Sable three mullets Or. Supporters Dexter a stag regardant Sable attired and hoofed Or charged on the body with an eagle displayed of the last gorged with a collar of SS and portcullises Gold; sinister a bay horse bridled saddled and supporting a staff Proper headed Or with a banner Vert fringed and charged with the letters Y. L. D. Gold meaning York light-dragoons.
