= Thomas Henry Lister =

British writer and senior civil servant

Thomas Lister
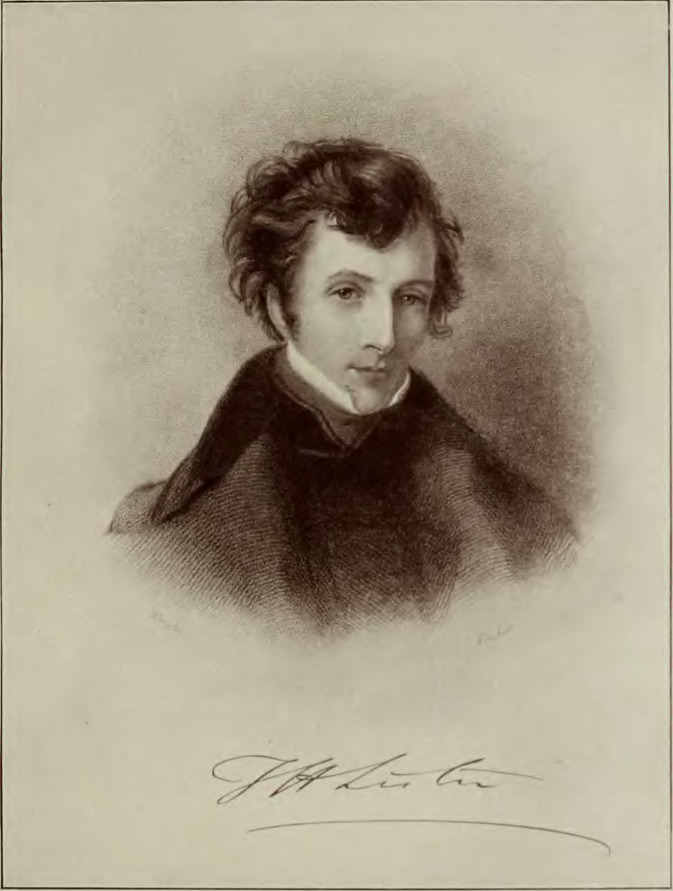
- Born: Thomas Henry Lister; 1800
- Died: 5 June 1842 (aged 41–42); London, England
- Occupation: Registrar General
- Spouse: Lady Maria Theresa Villiers (m. 1830)
- Children: Thomas Villiers Lister (b. 1832); Maria Theresa Villiers Lister; Alice Beatrice Lister
- Writing career
- Genre: Novelist
- Notable works: Granby (1826); Herbert Lacy (1828); Arlington (1832); Life of Clarendon (1838)

Thomas Henry Lister (1800 – 5 June 1842) was an English novelist and biographer, and served as Registrar General in the British civil service. He was an early exponent of the silver fork novel as a genre and also presaged "futuristic" writing in one of his stories.

== Life and writings ==
Lister was the son of Thomas Lister of Armitage Park, Staffordshire, and his first wife Harriet Anne Seale. His maternal grandfather was John Seale. His paternal half-sister Adelaide Lister was first married to their second cousin, Thomas Lister, 2nd Baron Ribblesdale, and then to John Russell, 1st Earl Russell. Lister was educated at Westminster School and Trinity College, Cambridge. He was the brother of novelist Harriet Cradock.

His several novels include Granby (1826), Herbert Lacy (1828), and Arlington (1832). Granby, an early example of the silver fork novel, was favourably reviewed by Sydney Smith in the Edinburgh Review. He also wrote a Life of Clarendon. His 1830 story entitled "A Dialogue for the Year 2130" might be described as an early example of science fiction or "futuristic" writing, of the kind later popularized by Jules Verne and H. G. Wells. Published in The Keepsake, a literary annual, it looks forward to a world in which gentlemen go hunting on machines and shoot horses, while a certain Lady D. owns a troublesome automatic letter-writer and is served by a "steam-porter", which opens doors.

In 1836 he was appointed the first Registrar General for England and Wales heading a new General Register Office. He set up the system of civil registration of births, deaths and marriages and organized the 1841 UK Census.

== Personal matters ==
On 6 November 1830, Lister married Lady Maria Theresa Villiers, daughter of George Villiers and Theresa Parker, both of noble families. They had three children:

- Sir Thomas Villiers Lister (1832–1902), diplomat, married first Fanny Harriet Coryton and secondly Florence Selina Hamilton, daughter of the geologist William Hamilton by his second wife, Margaret Frances Florence Dillon.
- Maria Theresa Villiers Lister (died 1 February 1863), married the politician William Vernon Harcourt, by whom she had a son, Lewis Harcourt, 1st Viscount Harcourt.
- Alice Beatrice Lister (died 28 March 1898), married Algernon Borthwick, 1st Baron Glenesk, owner of the London newspaper The Morning Post, by whom she had a daughter, Lilias Margaret Frances Borthwick, who married Seymour Bathurst, 7th Earl Bathurst.

Thomas Henry Lister died of tuberculosis in 1842, while living at Adelphi Terrace, London.
