= Gisburne Park =

Grade I listed English country house in the United Kingdom

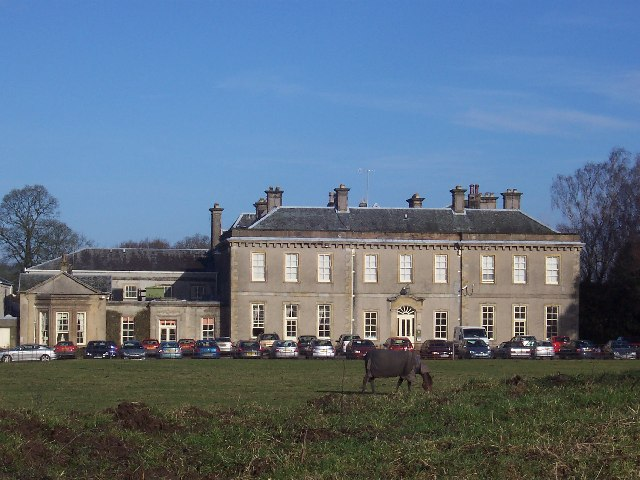

- Location within the Borough of Ribble Valley

General information
- Location: Gisburn, Lancashire, England
- Coordinates: 53.9407°N 2.2665°W
- Construction started: 1727
- Completed: 1736
- Owner: Guy and Amber Hindley

Technical details
- Floor count: 2

Design and construction
- Architect: Thomas Lister

Listed Building – Grade I
- Designated: 16 November 1954
- Reference no.: 1317877

Gisburne Park is an 18th-century country house and associated park in Gisburn, Lancashire, England, in the Ribble Valley some 6 miles (10 km) north-east of Clitheroe. The house is a Grade I listed building, and is now privately owned by Amber and Guy Hindley. The associated 1,000 acre park is Grade II listed, and is partly traditional agricultural estate and partly a holiday and wedding destination.

== History ==
The Manor of Gisburne was first acquired by the Lister family in 1614 but the family only moved from Arnoldsbiggin to Lower Hall, Gisburne in 1706. The present hall was built between 1727 and 1736 by Thomas Lister with two storeys to an H-shaped floor plan, the south frontage having nine bays, the central three recessed, all pebbledashed with sandstone dressings and hipped slate roof. Lister was the Member of Parliament for Clitheroe from 1713 to his death in 1745. He was reputed to have planted over a million oak trees in this stretch of the Ribble Valley and in the surrounding parkland kept a herd of semi-wild white cattle which died out in 1859. The estate then passed from father to son through Thomas (1723–1761), also MP for Clitheroe from 1745 to 1761, to Thomas (1752-1826), MP for Clitheroe from 1773 to 1790 who in 1797 was created Baron Ribblesdale. He was followed in turn by Thomas, the second Baron Ribblesdale, then Thomas, the third Baron and finally Thomas Lister, 4th Baron Ribblesdale.

On the fourth baron's death in 1925 part of the estate had to be sold to cover death duties. He had two sons, both of whom had been killed in action, one in the Boer War and the other in the first World War and he was survived only by his two sisters. On their deaths in 1944, the remaining estate was sold to the Hindley family, one of the founders of the British Home Stores.

In October 1985, Gisburne Park house was converted and extended to become an independent private hospital and rehabilitation centre, with Christopher Hindley being its chairman and later its executive director. In 1995 the house and adjacent land was sold and became the BMI Gisburne Park Hospital.

In June 2021, after 36 years, the private hospital closed its doors and Amber and Guy Hindley purchased the building and have plans to convert it into a hotel and wellness resort.

== The park ==
Designations

National Register of Historic Parks and Gardens
- Designated: 19 December 2011
- Reference no.: 1400674

The 1,000-acre parkland, owned since 2003 by Guy Hindley and his American actress wife Amber Mead, is home to Ribblesdale Holiday Park (developed around the old Deer House Farm and dairy). The Pennine Bridleway passes through the park, and at the south end of the park, the Ribble Valley line passes under the park in a cut-and-cover tunnel.

== See also ==
- Grade I listed buildings in Lancashire
- Listed buildings in Gisburn
