= Granby (novel) =

1826 novel

- Author: Thomas Henry Lister
- Language: English
- Genre: Silver Fork
- Publisher: Henry Colburn
- Publication date: 1826
- Publication place: United Kingdom
- Media type: Print

Granby is an 1826 novel by the British writer Thomas Henry Lister, published in three volumes. His first novel, it was part of the emerging genre of silver fork novels which take place in fashionable upper class settings of Regency Britain.

== Bibliography ==
- Adburgham, Alison. Silver Fork Society: Fashionable Life and Literature from 1814 to 1840. Faber & Faber, 2012.
- Copeland, Edward. The Silver Fork Novel: Fashionable Fiction in the Age of Reform. Cambridge University Press, 2012.
- Rosa, Matthew Whiting. The Silver-fork School: Novels of Fashion Preceding Vanity Fair. Columbia University Press, 1936.
