= Armitage Park =

Country house in Staffordshire, England

Coordinates: 52.7445°N 1.9028°W

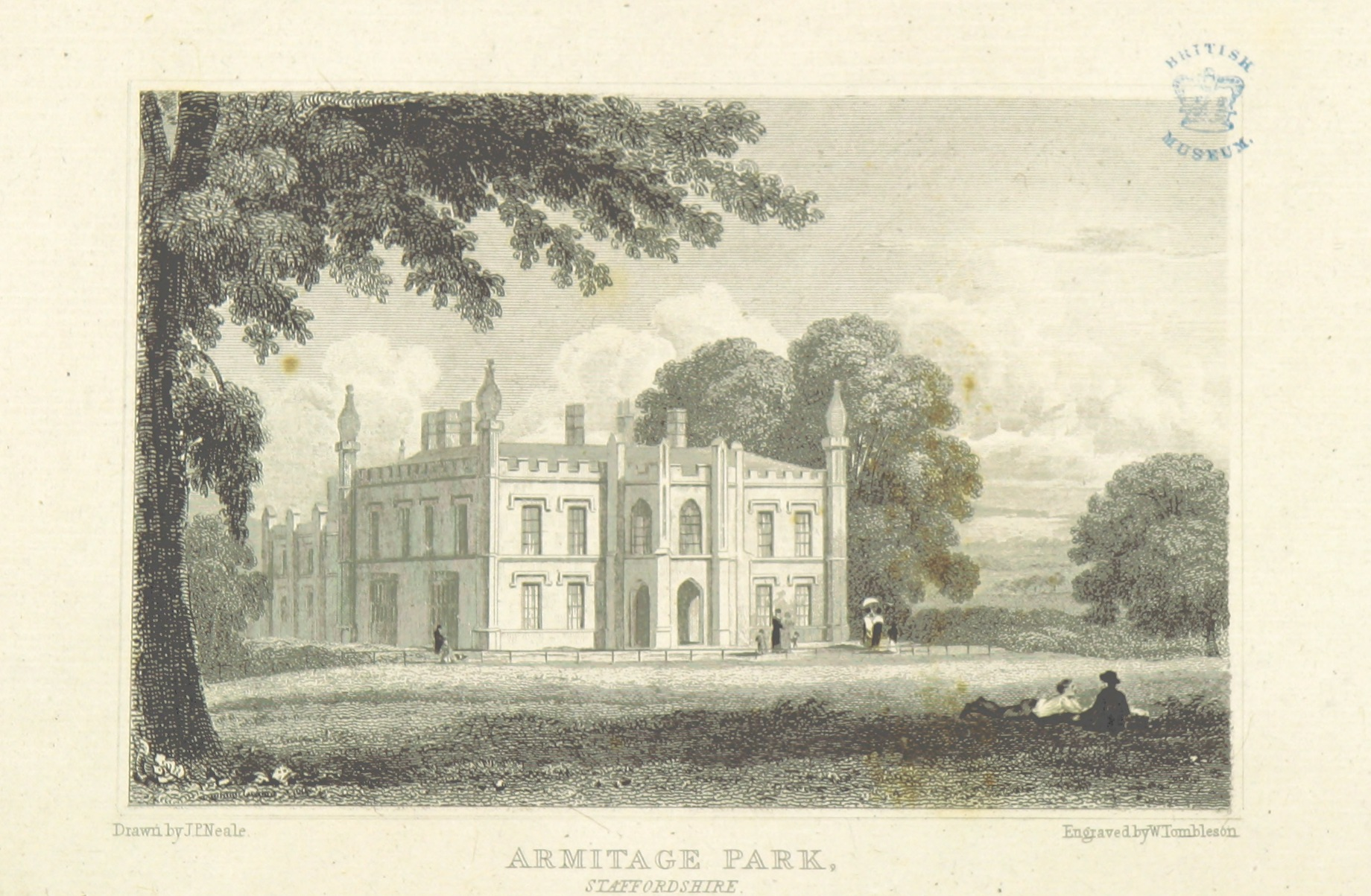
Armitage Park, Staffordshire drawn by Neale in 1818

Armitage Park (which has reverted to an earlier name of Hawkesyard Hall) is a 19th-century Grade II listed country house at Armitage near Rugeley, Staffordshire.

== History ==
The land at Armitage was purchased by Nathaniel Lister, (poet and author, Member of Parliament for Clitheroe and uncle of Baron Ribblesdale) following his marriage to Martha Fletcher a Lichfield heiress and he built the house in the Gothic Revival style about 1760.

Mary Spode, Mother of Josiah Spode IV, bought the property Circa 1838 and the house was much altered and extended by her in 1839. Josiah Spode IV was High Sheriff of Staffordshire in 1850.

On Spode's death in 1893 the property was left to his niece Helen Gulson who had a vision of Mary in the gardens of the Hall. This vision led to the building of the Church at Hawkesyard with the Altar being placed on the very spot where Mary was seen. Helen Gulson left the Hall, Church and grounds to the Dominican Order and moved into a property in the Halls grounds which became known as Gulson House.

Hawkesyard became the first Roman Catholic conference centre in the United Kingdom under the guidance of Fr. Conrad Pepler. In the 1990s the Priory and dorms were converted into a nursing home. The nursing home is trading as Hawksyard Priory Nursing Home Limited and is registered for a maximum of 106 residents under a CQC registration.

When the Dominicans left in 1988 the Hall fell into a state of disrepair and was boarded up.

In 1999 the Hall and gardens were purchased by Relaine Estates Limited who were determined to return the building and surrounding grounds to their former glory. The Company decided to use the original name of Hawkesyard and set about the restoration of the building, partly by using photographs from Shugborough Hall's collection. The transformation of the Hall and outer buildings were completed in 2007.

Hawkesyard Hall and its grounds are now primarily used as a Weddings, Conference and Events venue.
