= Thomas Lister, 4th Baron Ribblesdale =

British politician (1854–1925)

The Right Honourable The Lord Ribblesdale
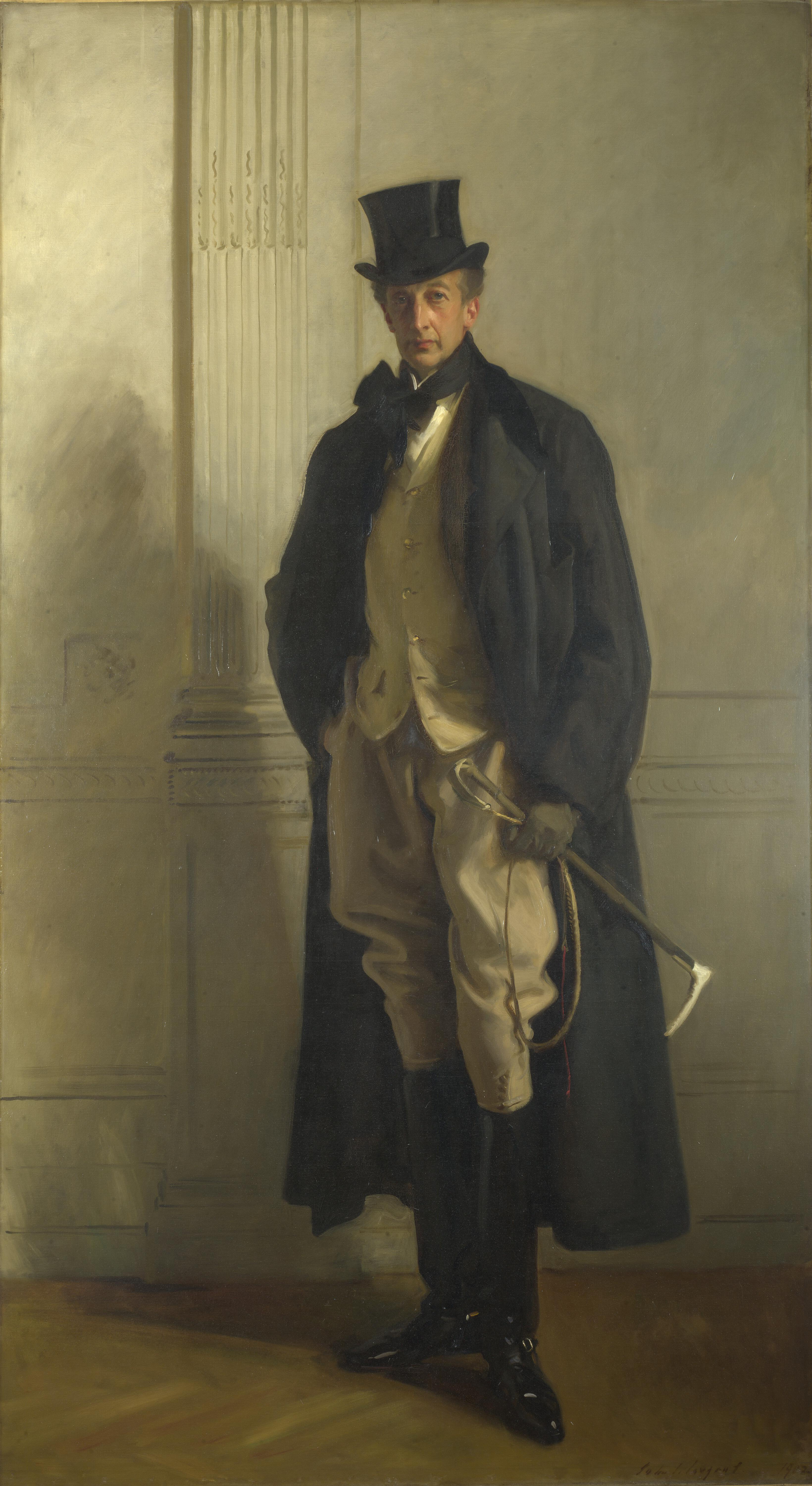
- Lord Ribblesdale by John Singer Sargent, 1902

Baron Ribblesdale
- In office 1876–1925
- Preceded by: Thomas Lister, 3rd Baron Ribblesdale
- Succeeded by: Title extinct

Personal details
- Born: 29 October 1854 Fontainebleau, France
- Died: 21 October 1925 (aged 70) Mayfair, London
- Party: Liberal
- Spouses: Charlotte Monkton Tennant (m. 1877; died 1911) Ava Lowle Willing (m. 1919)
- Children: 5
- Parent(s): Thomas Lister; Emma Mure
- Relatives: William Mure (grandfather)

Thomas Lister, 4th Baron Ribblesdale (29 October 1854 – 21 October 1925) was a British Liberal politician.

== Early life ==
Thomas Lister was born on 29 October 1854 in Fontainebleau, France, the eldest son of Thomas Lister, 3rd Baron Ribblesdale (1828–1876), and his wife Emma (née Mure) (1833–1911), daughter of William Mure. He succeeded his father in the barony in 1876.

== Career ==
Lord Ribblesdale sat on the Liberal benches in the House of Lords and served as a Lord-in-waiting (government whip in the House of Lords) under William Ewart Gladstone from 1880 to 1885 and in 1886 and as Master of the Buckhounds under Gladstone and later Lord Rosebery from 1892 to 1895. Apart from his political career he was also a Captain in the Rifle Brigade and a Trustee of the National Gallery from 1909 to 1925.

His portrait was painted by John Singer Sargent and is said to epitomise the British aristocrat.

== Personal life ==
On 7 April 1877, Lord Ribblesdale married Charlotte Monkton Tennant (1858–1911), daughter of Sir Charles Tennant, 1st Baronet (1823–1906) and Emma Winsloe (1821–1895), and sister of Margot Tennant, at The Savoy Chapel, London. Lady Ribblesdale died on 2 May 1911. The couple had two sons, who were both killed in military service, and three daughters:

- Capt. Hon. Thomas Lister DSO (2 May 1878 – 13 January 1904), who received the Distinguished Service Order (DSO) for service in the Second Boer War (1899–1902), and was killed in action serving with the 10th Royal Hussars during the Dervish War of 1903–04.
- Hon. Barbara Lister (30 May 1880 – 22 December 1943), who married Sir Mathew Wilson, 4th Baronet (1875–1958), and had three sons
- 2nd Lt. Hon. Charles Alfred Lister (26 October 1887 – 28 August 1915), who died from wounds received at the Battle of Gallipoli while serving with Royal Marine Light Infantry during the First World War
- Hon. Laura Lister (12 January 1892 – 24 March 1965), who married Simon Fraser, 14th Lord Lovat (1871–1933)
- Hon. Diana Lister (7 May 1893 – 3 December 1983), who first married Lt. Percy Lyulph Wyndham (1887–1914; † during the 1st Battle of the Aisne), then Captain Arthur "Boy" Capel (1881–1919), and thirdly Vere Fane, 14th Earl of Westmorland (1893–1948)

On 3 June 1919, Lord Ribblesdale married secondly Ava Lowle Willing, daughter of Edward Shippen Willing and Alice Caroline Barton and former wife of John Jacob Astor IV, at St Mary's, Bryanston Square in London.

He died on 21 October 1925, aged 70 at his townhouse in Grosvenor Square, Mayfair, London, and was buried in the Lister vault at St Mary the Virgin Churchyard, Gisburn, Lancashire. With his death the barony became extinct. Lady Ribblesdale died on 9 June 1958 in her apartment at 720 Park Avenue in New York City and she was buried in Trinity Church Cemetery.

=== Descendants ===
Among his grandchildren were Simon Fraser, 15th Lord Lovat and 4th Baron Lovat (1911–1995), Sir Hugh Fraser (1918–1984), the Secretary of State for Air from 1962 to 1964, David Fane, 15th Earl of Westmorland (1924–1993), Julian Fane (1927–2009), the author. The actress Georgina Ward (1941-2010) was his great-granddaughter.

== Arms ==
Coat of arms of Thomas Lister, 4th Baron Ribblesdale
Crest A stag’s head erased per fess Proper and Gules attired Or differenced with a crescent. Escutcheon Ermine on a fess Sable three mullets Or. Supporters Dexter a stag regardant Sable attired and hoofed Or charged on the body with an eagle displayed of the last gorged with a collar of SS and portcullises Gold; sinister a bay horse bridled saddled and supporting a staff Proper headed Or with a banner Vert fringed and charged with the letters Y. L. D. Gold meaning York light-dragoons.

Political offices
Preceded by The Earl of Coventry	Master of the Buckhounds; 1892–1895	Succeeded by The Earl of Coventry
Preceded by The Earl Waldegrave	Government Chief Whip in the House of Lords; 1905–1907	Succeeded by The Lord Denman
Party political offices
Preceded by The Lord Kensington	Liberal Chief Whip in the House of Lords; 1896–1907	Succeeded by The Lord Denman
Peerage of Great Britain
Preceded by Thomas Lister	Baron Ribblesdale; 1876–1925	Extinct
