= New Burlington Street =

Street in central London

Coordinates: 51.5118°N 0.1404°W

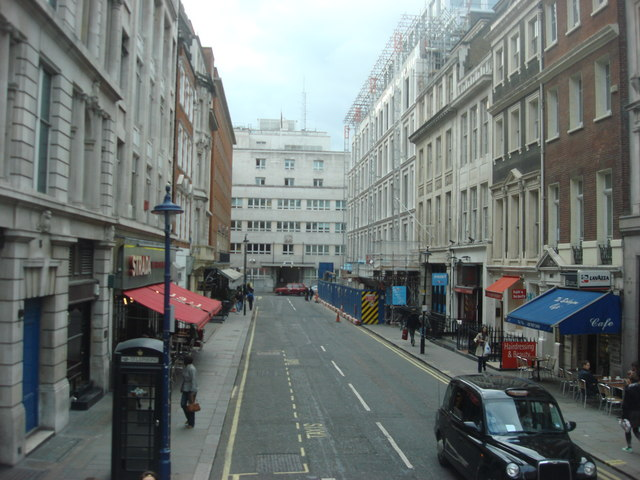
New Burlington Street in 2008

New Burlington Street (originally Little Burlington Street) is a street in central London that is on land that was once part of the Burlington Estate. The current architecture of the street bears little resemblance to the original design of the street when first built in the early eighteenth century.

== Location ==
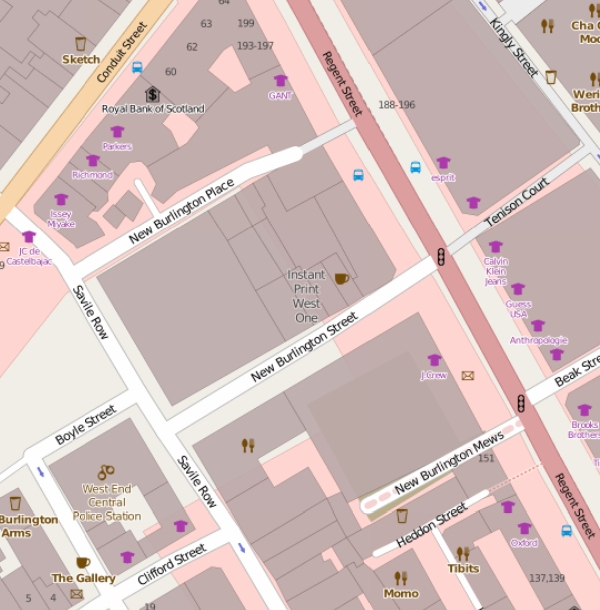
Immediate vicinity of New Burlington Street

The street runs east–west from Savile Row to Regent Street.

== History ==
New Burlington Street was the last street to be built on the Burlington Estate, in c. 1735–9. The street was intended, like other streets on the estate, for occupation principally by people of high social status and its first houses, many now demolished, were similar to those on Savile Row. Also like Savile Row, the street included commercial premises as well; number 11, for instance, was first occupied by Robert Fisher, who ran Burlington Coffee House (or Fisher's Coffee House) from the building.

According to Hughson's London, it was in New Burlington Street in 1763 that the practice of placing brass name-plates on doors first started. The idea then spread to Hanover Square and from there was generally adopted.

In 1771, Sir Joseph Banks acquired a house in the street after his return from Captain James Cook's first great voyage (1768–1771), during which he visited Brazil, Tahiti, and Australia. Banks was President of the Royal Society for over 40 years.

Number 5 was first occupied by the Dowager Viscountess Irwin, a member of the Howard family and daughter of the third Earl of Carlisle, in 1735 or 1736. Between 1848 and 1869 the house was the headquarters of the Royal Asiatic Society.

== Mary Boyle's "blue-stocking" parties ==
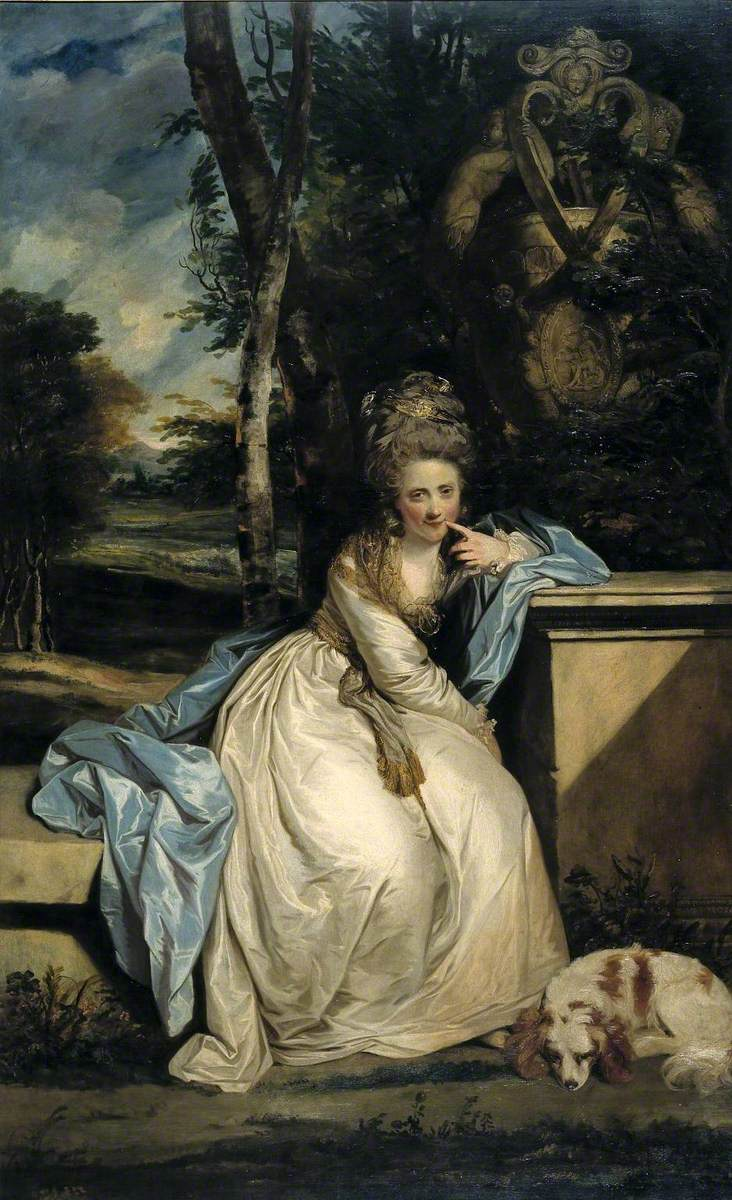
Portrait of Mary Monckton by Joshua Reynolds, c.1777–1778

Mary Boyle, Countess of Cork and legendary bluestocking, had a house in the street and died there in 1840. Her home was the site of numerous literary parties over more than fifty years, attended by figures such as Dr. Samuel Johnson, Richard Brinsley Sheridan, King George IV, British Prime Minister George Canning (who once practised his debating skills at the nearby Clifford Street Club), the actors Sarah Siddons and her brother John Kemble, and the poet Lord Byron.

Her house was described as "most tastefully fitted for the reception of her illustrious guests: every part of it abounded in pretty things — objets, as they are sometimes called, which her visitors were strictly forbidden to touch. Beyond her magnificent drawing-rooms appeared a boudoir, and beyond it a long rustic room, with a moss-covered floor, with plants and statues".

Boyle's parties were of two kinds: "fine-lady parties, which she called pink; her blue-stocking parties, which she called blue; and, more frequently, a mixture of both. At the last, she would assemble two or three fine ladies, two or three wits or poets, two or three noblemen and distinguished members of the House of Commons, and one or two of her own family, seldom exceeding ten or twelve, at a round table".

== Listed buildings ==
Numbers 1 and 2 New Burlington Street have been accorded Grade II listed building status by English Heritage. They comprise a pair of terraced houses, built in 1717–20, that were part of Lord Burlington's early development of the area.

== 10 New Burlington Street ==
Number 10 is a new building, built by the Crown Estate and Examplar, and designed by the architects AHMM. There will be 40,000 square feet (3,700 m^{2}) of retail space on three floors, plus 95,000 square feet (8,800 m^{2}) of office space above. The retail space has been let in its entirety to the American clothing retailer J.Crew, and it will be their first retail store in Europe. It was completed in June 2014, totals 195,000 sq ft of offices and retail, and was 80% let as of June 2014. It is the UK's first speculatively-built new building to be lit exclusively by LEDs.
