= Henry Monckton =

British Army officer

- Born: 13 July 1740
- Died: 28 June 1778 (aged 37); Freehold Borough, New Jersey
- Military career
- Allegiance: Great Britain
- Branch: British Army
- Rank: Lieutenant colonel
- Conflict: American Revolutionary War; Battle of Long Island; Battle of Assunpink Creek; Battle of Brandywine; Battle of Germantown; Battle of Monmouth †

Henry Monckton (13 July 1740 – 28 June 1778) was the fourth son of John Monckton, 1st Viscount Galway, and the younger half-brother of the more famous Robert Monckton.

During the American Revolutionary War he led a battalion of converged British grenadiers while a lieutenant colonel. He was wounded at Long Island during the New York and New Jersey campaign in 1776. He led a temporary brigade at Assunpink Creek. In the Philadelphia campaign of 1777, he led a grenadier battalion at both the Battle of Brandywine and the Battle of Germantown.

He was killed leading his soldiers at the Battle of Monmouth on 28 June 1778.

== Early career ==
Born on 13 July 1740, Monckton was the fourth son of John Monckton, 1st Viscount Galway, although the second by his second wife, Jane Westenra of Rathleagh, Queen's County, Ireland. His older half-brother Robert Monckton (1726–1782) became a high ranking general officer in the British army, as later did his nephew, Henry, the son of his brother Edward Monckton, a nabob and Member of Parliament. Monckton's only sister, Mary, was a famous blue-stocking and later presided over an important literary and political salon.

Monckton commanded the 45th Foot from 25 July 1771 until 1772. He was wounded at the Battle of Long Island on 22 August 1776, while leading the 1st Grenadier Battalion in the army of Sir William Howe with the rank of lieutenant colonel. At time of the Battle of Trenton on 26 December 1776, he served as acting commander of Major General James Robertson's 1st British Brigade at New York City. After the Trenton disaster, he took command of an ad hoc brigade consisting of William Medows' 1st Grenadier Battalion, his own 2nd Grenadier Battalion, and James Ogilvie's 2nd Guards Battalion. Leading this force, he went to New Jersey with Lord Charles Cornwallis and fought at the Battle of the Assunpink Creek on 2 January 1777. The following day, George Washington outmaneuvered the British and defeated them at the Battle of Princeton. In the aftermath, Cornwallis made a rapid retreat to his base at New Brunswick, New Jersey.

== Philadelphia campaign ==
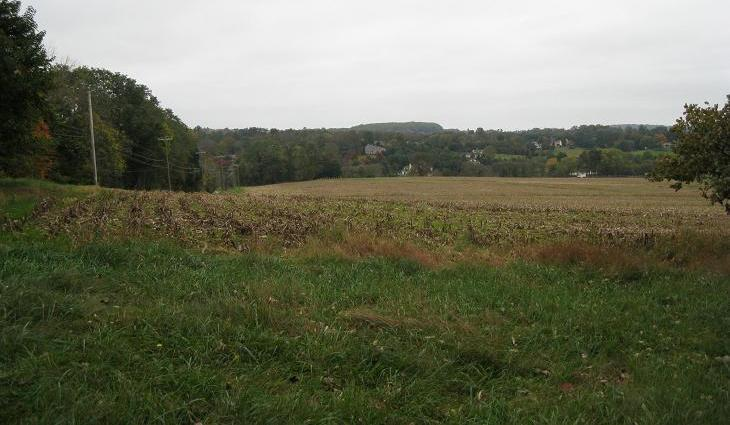
Osborne's Hill; power lines on the left mark Birmingham Road

At the Battle of Brandywine on 11 September 1777, Monckton led the 2nd Grenadier Battalion, which was formed from 15 grenadier companies taken from the regiments of foot. As the British advanced south from Osborne's Hill, the left flank of the 2nd Grenadiers touched the Birmingham road while the 1st Grenadiers deployed on their right. The battalion struck Thomas Conway's 3rd Pennsylvania Brigade, driving it back.

Near sunset, the advancing 2nd Grenadiers walked into a trap set by George Weedon's fresh Virginia brigade, which was deployed on a reverse slope with its right flank thrown forward so as to take the British line in enfilade. Once he found his troops in a tight spot, Monckton asked Hessian Captain Johann von Ewald to ride back and summon reinforcements. Ewald located James Agnew who brought his 4th Brigade up on Monckton's left. Supported by two 6-pound cannons, the British finally dislodged the Americans as darkness fell, but not before the 64th Foot lost 47 casualties. The grenadiers also suffered serious losses at Brandywine. Of the 10 British officers killed in the engagement, seven were from the two grenadier battalions, and an additional seven grenadier officers were wounded, including Medows, shot in the arm.

On 26 September, the British Army marched into the rebel capital of Philadelphia. One witness remembered Monckton leading both British grenadier battalions. His circle of friends among the British officers included Sir George Osborn, 4th Baronet, William Harcourt, Richard FitzPatrick, and Sir John Wrottesley, 8th Baronet. On 4 October, the Battle of Germantown was fought. Monckton double-timed his grenadiers from their barracks in Philadelphia to the field of action. On the way they passed the slower-moving Hessian grenadiers. Led by Cornwallis, the grenadiers arrived just as the American attack collapsed. They led the pursuit up Germantown Road as far as Chestnut Hill.

== Death at Monmouth ==
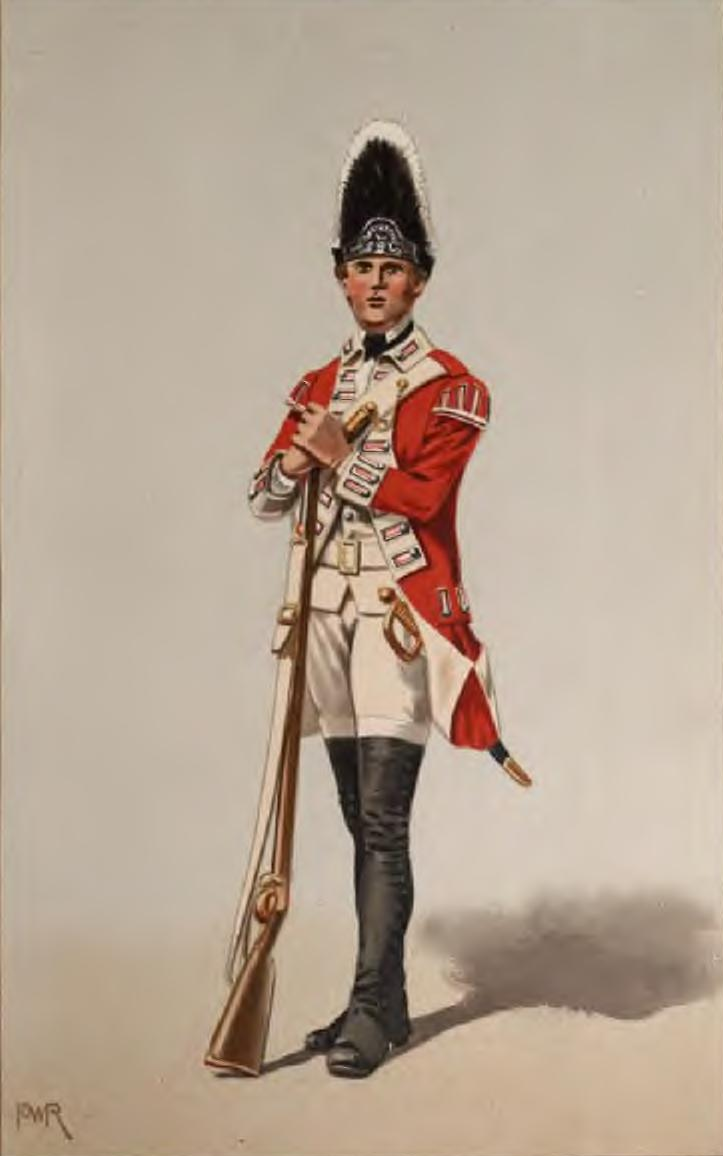
Grenadier, 40th Foot

In March 1778, Secretary of State for the American Colonies George Germain, 1st Viscount Sackville, sent orders permitting the evacuation of Philadelphia. Worried about being trapped in the Delaware River by a French fleet, the new British commander Henry Clinton determined to move most of his army to New York by land. The naval transports were packed with most of the army's women and children, 3,000 loyalist civilians, sick soldiers, and the unreliable Ansbach-Bayreuth mercenaries. The transports set sail early on 18 June. That day, Philadelphia was abandoned and Clinton's army marched east to Haddonfield, New Jersey. From there Clinton's army marched in a northeasterly direction via Mount Holly, Bordentown, Allentown, and Imlaystown. Wilhelm von Knyphausen's leading division reached Monmouth Court House on 26 June, to be joined shortly by Cornwallis' division. After his army rested on the 26th and 27th, Clinton planned to move northeast to Sandy Hook where naval transports would take his army to New York.

Meanwhile, Washington moved his army northeast from Valley Forge, Pennsylvania and crossed the Delaware at Coryell's Ferry. On 23 June, the American army reached Hopewell, New Jersey, and moved east to intercept Clinton. After some hesitation, Washington appointed his second-in-command, Charles Lee to lead his advance guard. At 4:00 a.m., on 28 June, Knyphausen's division began its march from Monmouth Court House, followed at 8:00 a.m. by Cornwallis' division. Lee failed to scout the terrain and told his subordinates that he had no plan of battle other than to act according to circumstances. He only began moving forward at 7:00 a.m. with 5,000 troops and 10 cannons. When Lee arrived near the British positions, Clinton turned back to assist his covering party with strong rear guard forces, including the two grenadier battalions. After some attacks miscarried, Lee's division retreated with Clinton in pursuit.

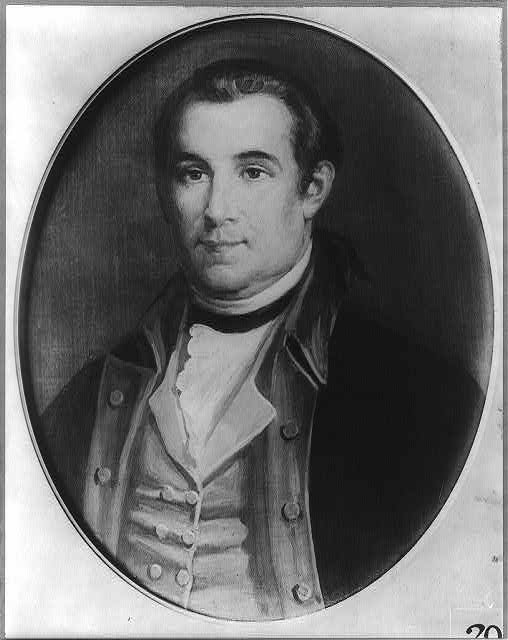
Eleazer Oswald's cannons probably fired the case shot that killed Monckton

At length, Lee's withdrawing troops met Washington's main body moving forward. Washington relieved Lee of command, but apparently relented and allowed Lee to cobble together a defensive line with the troops at hand. He placed Varnum's Brigade, then under the command of Jeremiah Olney behind a hedgerow. A detachment under Henry Livingston Jr. took position on Olney's left. Farther to the left, Anthony Wayne directed soldiers led by Walter Stewart and Nathaniel Ramsey into some woods. Lee's chief of artillery, Eleazer Oswald placed two cannons on Olney's right and two more in support of Wayne's troops. Stewart and Ramsey ambushed the 1st Guards Battalion as it passed by. Though their commander Colonel Henry Trelawney and 40 men were hit, the Brigade of Guards and two companies of the 1st Grenadier Battalion rushed the woods. In a hard-fought action, the Americans were flushed from the trees and set upon by the 16th Light Dragoons in the open. Stewart was wounded and Ramsey wounded and captured as their commands raced to cross a bridge to the west side of the ravine.

The 16th Light Dragoons tried to charge the hedgerow but Olney's men repulsed them with a blast of gunfire. Clinton personally led forward the 2nd Grenadiers and one wing of the 1st Grenadiers, calling out, "Charge, grenadiers, never heed forming." Case shot from Oswald's guns ripped into the grenadiers from a range of 40 yards (37 m), but they stormed the hedgerow anyway, driving back Olney's men. During the desperate action, Washington's chief of artillery Henry Knox ordered Oswald to pull back. Covered by Olney's brigade, he managed to get across the bridge without losing any guns. The action was so chaotic that a party of 16 grenadiers found themselves amid Olney's brigade, but the Americans were so focused on getting away that they paid no attention to their enemies. Sometime during the action at the hedgerow, a British officer saw Monckton fall, struck by grape shot. He detailed some of his soldiers to retrieve his commander, but apparently this was not done. After the battle some men of the 1st Pennsylvania Regiment found Monckton. The mortally wounded officer was taken to the Old Tennent Church where he died the same day.

Oddly, Clinton did not mention Monckton in his report of the battle. However, Hessian Adjutant General Carl Leopold Baurmeister wrote, "Colonel Monckton was killed, a great loss indeed." Monckton is buried in the Old Tennent Cemetery in Manalapan, New Jersey. The inscription on his grave marker reads: "Lt. Col. Henry Monckton who on the plains of Monmouth 28 June 1778 sealed with his life his duty and devotion to his king and country. This memorial erected by Samuel Fryer whose father a subject of Great Britain sleeps in an unknown grave." Because he was found by men of the 1st Pennsylvania, a legend grew up that Monckton was killed while attacking that regiment late in the battle. It was supposed that they not only recovered his body but the colors of his regiment. In fact, the grenadier battalions carried no colors and Monckton fell around noon. In one account, Monckton's mortal wounding and the loss of the colors came late in the day at the hands of Anthony Wayne's troops in front of Washington's main position. In another account, Monckton exhorted his men before the fatal attack saying, "On to the day!" Meanwhile, on the American side, Wayne urged his soldiers, "Steady! Steady boys! Wait for the word and pick off the king's birds."
