= Master of the Staghounds =

Position in the British Royal Household

Master of the staghounds was a position in the British Royal Household created in 1738 and abolished in 1782. The office was responsible for the oversight and care of the Royal staghounds (dogs bred for hunting deer).

"Master of staghounds" was also a title or descriptive given to staghound masters on a more local level.

== Masters of the Staghounds ==
- 1738: Evelyn Pierrepont, 2nd Duke of Kingston-upon-Hull
- 1744: Lord Robert Manners-Sutton
- 1762: Vacant
- 1763: William Byron, 5th Baron Byron
- 1765: William Monckton-Arundell, 2nd Viscount Galway
- 1770: William Capell, 4th Earl of Essex

== See also ==
- Devon and Somerset Staghounds
