= Thomas Lister (British politician, born 1688) =

British landowner and Tory MP (1688–1745)

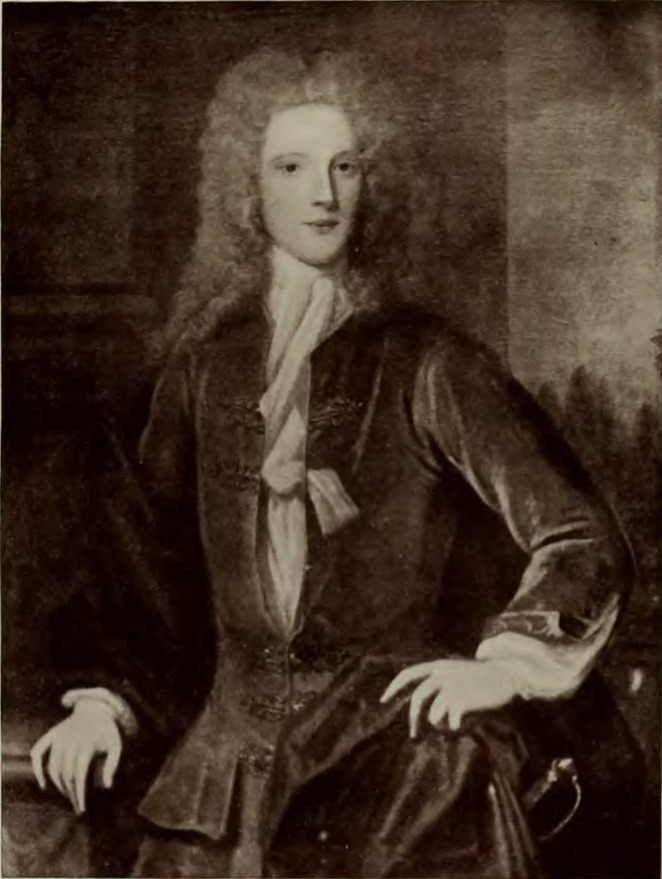
- portrait by Michael Dahl

Member of Parliament for Clitheroe
- In office 1713–1745

Personal details
- Born: 8 October 1688 Gisburn, Yorkshire
- Died: 15 May 1745 (aged 56)
- Party: Tory
- Spouse: Catherine Assheton (m. 1716; died 1728)
- Children: 5, including: Thomas Lister; Nathaniel Lister
- Relatives: Thomas Lister, 1st Baron Ribblesdale (grandson)
- Education: Eton College; Balliol College, Oxford; Middle Temple
- Occupation: Politician

Thomas Lister (8 October 1688 – 15 May 1745), of Gisburne Park, Yorkshire, was a British landowner and Tory politician who represented Clitheroe in the House of Commons from 1713 to 1745.

== Early life and education ==
Lister was born in October 1688, the eldest son of Thomas Lister of Arnoldsbigging and Westby Hall, Yorkshire and his wife Elizabeth Parker, daughter of John Parker of Entwistle, Lancashire. He was educated at Eton College from 1698 to 1706 and matriculated at Balliol College, Oxford on 1 February 1706, aged 17, although he claimed to have learnt very little in two and a half years there. He succeeded his father in 1706. In 1709, he was admitted at Middle Temple.

== Career ==
Lister's family held an electoral interest at Clitheroe, having owned property there since the 14th century. When he stood at a by-election on 23 April 1713, he was described as a ‘very puisne young gentleman’, as well as being ‘honest’. After being returned as Member of Parliament for Clitheroe in 1713, he made little impact in Parliament. He was classed as a Tory but in spite of Tory leanings, he voted on 18 June 1713 against the French commerce bill.

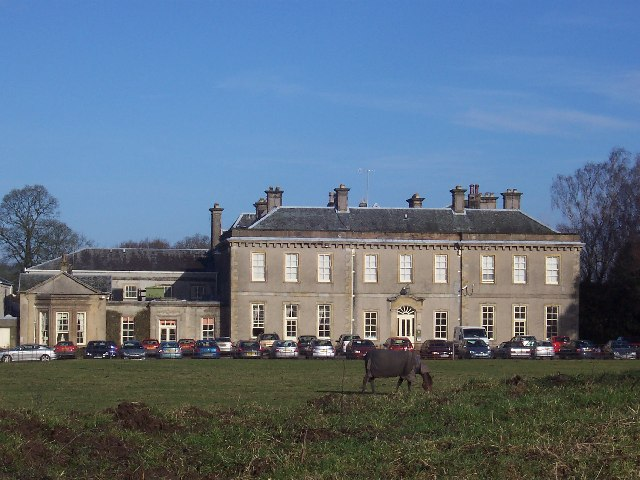
Gisburne Park

At the 1715 general election, Lister was elected MP for Clitheroe again in a contest. He improved his local interest by his marriage in 1716, and after he was elected in a contest at the 1722 general election he was able to turn this into control of one seat. He consistently voted against the Government, and spoke on 7 May 1728 against a vote of credit.

He moved the family seat from Arnoldsbigging to Lower Hall in Gisburn, which his father had acquired from Sir John Assheton in 1697. He rebuilt Lower Hall as Gisburne Park between 1726 and 1736. The hall is of two storeys on an H-shaped floor plane, with nine bays on the south front, the central three being recessed, pebbledashed with sandstone dressings and with a hipped slate roof.

The park was also developed and designs were produced by Robert, 8th Lord Petre. Lister was returned unopposed on his own interest at the general elections of 1727, 1734 and 1741.

== Marriage and family ==
On 27 November 1716, Lister married Catherine Assheton (died 1728), daughter of Sir Ralph Assheton, 2nd Baronet of Middleton Hall and Whalley Abbey, Lancashire. They had two sons and three daughters:

- Catherine Lister (3 December 1718 – buried 8 May 1732)
- Anne Lister (bapt. 22 May 1722 – buried 10 February 1755), died unmarried
- Thomas Lister (1723–1761), MP for Clitheroe
- Nathaniel Lister (1725–1793), MP for Clitheroe
- Mary Lister (buried 3 September 1759), died unmarried

His sons both sat for Clitheroe after his death. His grandson Thomas Lister (1752–1826) also represented Clitheroe and was raised to the peerage in 1797 as Baron Ribblesdale.

Lister died on 15 May 1745 and was buried at Gisburne on 22 May 1745.

Parliament of Great Britain
Preceded by Edward Harvey; Christopher Parker	Member of Parliament for Clitheroe – With: Christopher Parker; Charles Zedenno Stanley; Edward Harvey; Nathaniel Curzon; The Viscount Galway; William Curzon	Succeeded by Thomas Lister II; William Curzon
