= William Monckton-Arundell, 2nd Viscount Galway =

The Right Honourable The Viscount Galway
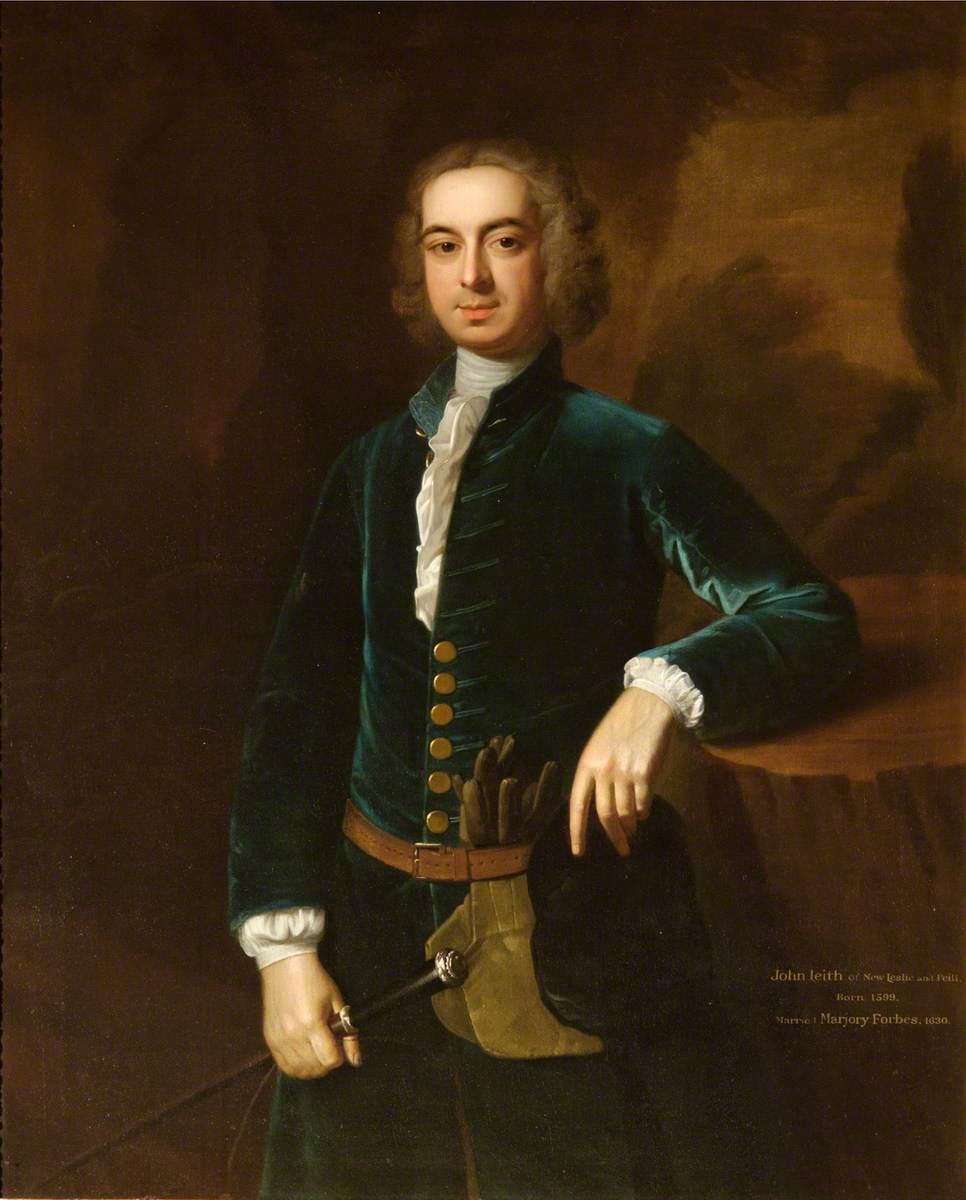
- Portrait by John Giles Eccardt
- Born: c. 1725; England
- Died: 18 November 1772; England
- Education: Westminster School
- Occupation: Politician
- Children: 5

William Monckton-Arundell, 2nd Viscount Galway (c. 1725 – 18 November 1772) was a British politician.

He was born c. 1725, the eldest surviving son of John Monckton, 1st Viscount Galway and the elder brother of Lieutenant-General Robert Monckton, the governor of New York. William was educated at Westminster School and succeeded his father as Viscount Galway in July 1751. His inheritance included the Grade I listed Serlby Hall in Nottinghamshire. In 1769 he inherited further estates from his maternal aunt, Lady Frances Arundell of Allerton Mauleverer, adopting the additional surname of Arundell in accordance with the terms of her will.

He was MP for Pontefract, a seat controlled by the Galway family, from 1747 to 1748. He was then elected MP for Thirsk (1749–1754) before being returned a second time for Pontefract (1754–1772). He was made Master of the Staghounds from 1765 to 1770.

He died in 1772. He had married Elizabeth, the daughter of Kitty da Costa and Joseph Isaac Villareal, with whom he had 3 sons and 2 daughters. He was succeeded as Viscount in turn by his sons Henry William (1749–1774) and Robert Monckton-Arundell, 4th Viscount Galway (1752–1810).

Parliament of Great Britain
Preceded by George Morton Pitt; John Monckton, 1st Viscount Galway	Member of Parliament for Pontefract; 1747–1748; With: George Morton Pitt	Succeeded by George Morton Pitt; John Monckton, 1st Viscount Galway
Preceded by Frederick Meinhardt Frankland; Thomas Frankland	Member of Parliament for Thirsk; 1749–1754; With: Thomas Frankland	Succeeded by Roger Talbot; Thomas Frankland
Preceded by George Morton Pitt; Robert Monckton	Member of Parliament for Pontefract; 1754–1772; With: Sambrooke Freeman; William Gerard Hamilton; Rowland Winn; Henry Strachey	Succeeded by Henry Strachey; Henry William Monckton Arundell
Political offices
Preceded by William Byron, 5th Baron Byron	Master of the Staghounds; 1765–1770	Succeeded by William Capell, 4th Earl of Essex
Peerage of Ireland
Preceded by John Monckton	Viscount Galway; 1751–1775	Succeeded by Henry William Monckton Arundell
