= Sambrooke Freeman =

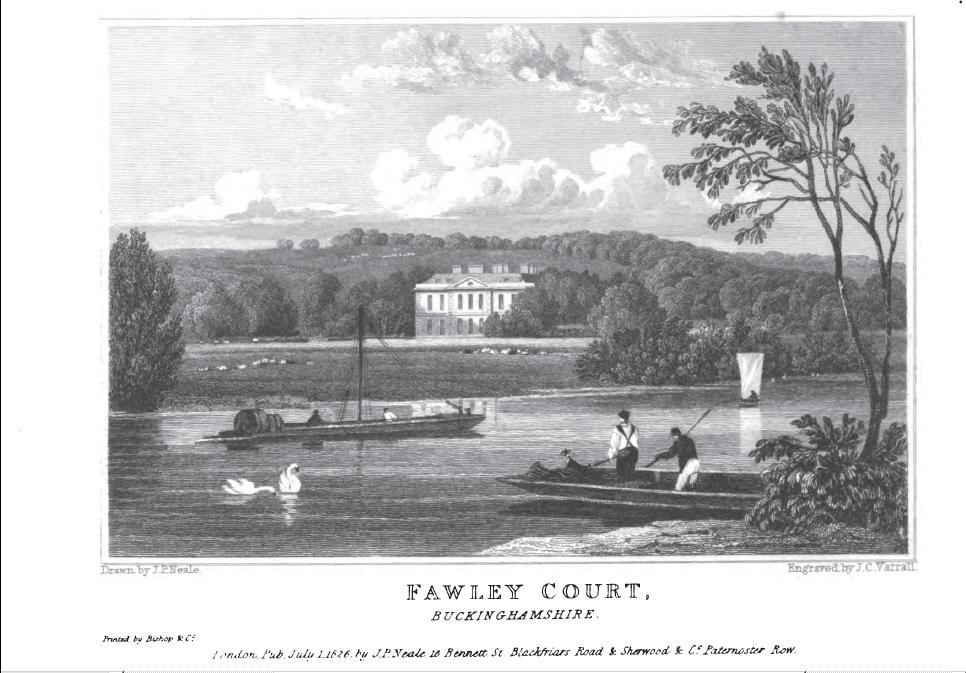
Fawley Court, the home of Sambrooke Freeman, viewed from the River Thames

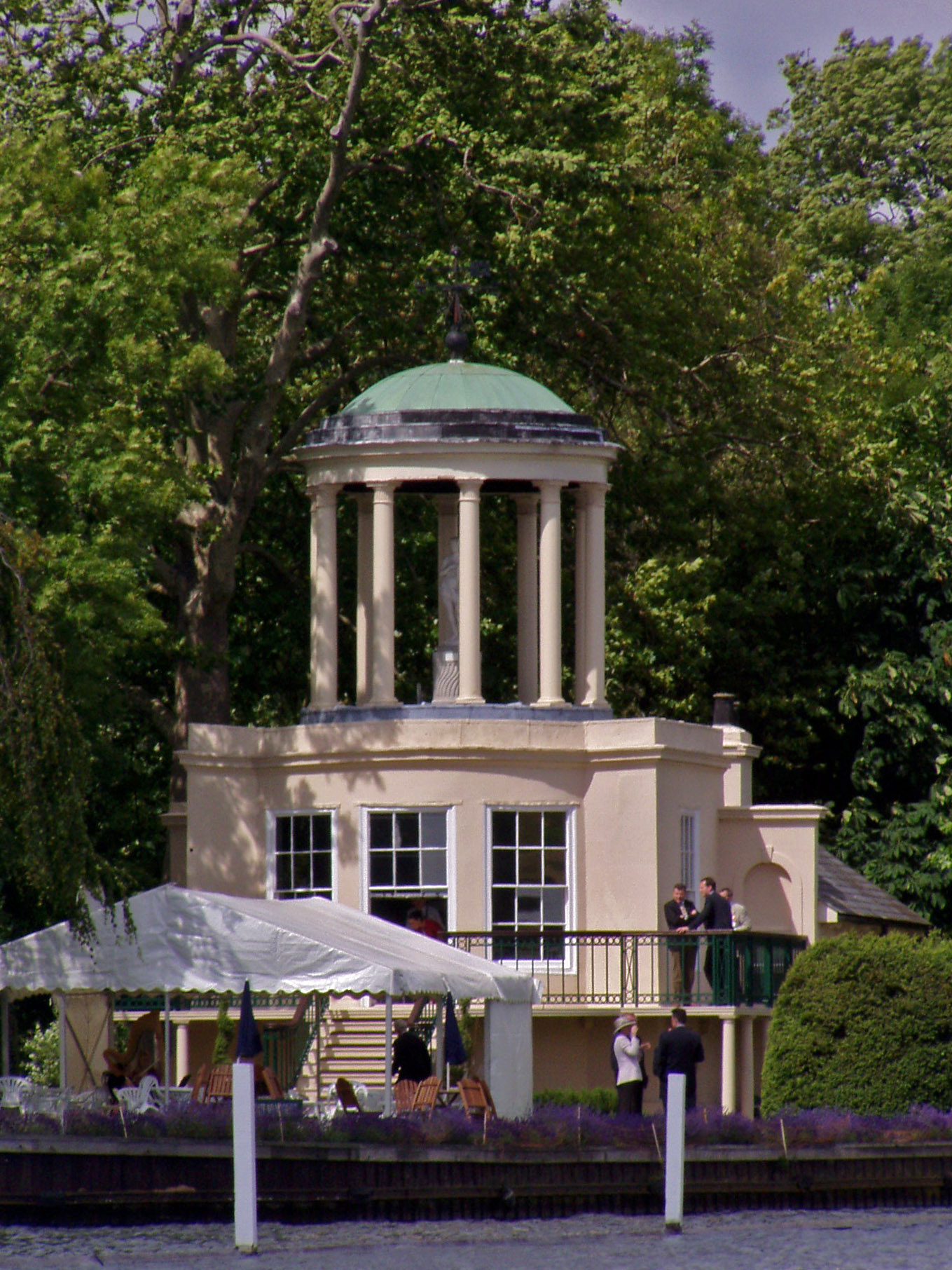
The temple on Temple Island, commissioned by Sambrooke Freeman and designed by James Wyatt in 1771

Sambrooke Freeman FRSA (aka Sambrook Freeman, c.1721–1782) was a member of the prominent Freeman family of Fawley Court near Henley-on-Thames, England. He was a Member of Parliament, for Pontefract in Yorkshire from 1754 to 1761 and Bridport in Dorset from 1768 to 1774.

Sambrooke Freeman was the son of John (Cooke) Freeman, a successful businessman. His first name derived from the Sambrooke family. Due to the Freeman family's rising fortune, Sambrooke Freeman was educated at University College, Oxford, graduating in 1739, followed by an expensive Grand Tour of Italy on two trips over nearly four years from 1744. He married Sarah Winsford daughter of Thomas Geers Winford of Glasshampton, Worcestershire in December 1757.

Freeman lived at Fawley Court, a large house close to the River Thames north of Henley-on-Thames and just in Buckinghamshire. He inherited the house on the death of his father in 1752. Capability Brown was commissioned to work on the grounds of the estate surrounding the house between 1764 and 1766. Freeman also had the house remodelled by the architect James Wyatt during the early 1770s is a Neoclassical style. Wyatt also designed the "temple" (a fishing lodge) on Temple Island on the river close to Fawley Court in 1771 for Freeman, with Etruscan-style murals inside.

Edward Cooper sold Phyllis Court to Sambrooke Freeman in 1768. He also bought the manors of Henley and Remenham in the same year.

Freeman worked on a pagoda fountain project for Prior Park south of the city of Bath that was never realized.

Sambrooke Freeman was twice an MP, for Pontefract and Bridport. He joined the Society of Arts in 1756, two years after its formation, and encouraged the involvement of Humphrey Gainsborough the inventor and Thomas Powys. When the Buckinghamshire Militia was reformed in 1759 he was commissioned as one of the captains.

Freeman tried to change the position (to the end of New Street, Henley) and style of the new stone Henley Bridge so it could form a pleasing view from his house, but was unsuccessful.

On his death in 1782, Fawley Court passed to his nephew, Strickland Freeman. After his death, his wife lived in Henley Park, a dower house in the deer park of the Fawley Court Estate. She died on 2 October 1806.

Parliament of Great Britain
| Preceded by Robert Monckton; George Morton Pitt | Member of Parliament for Pontefract; 1754 – 1761; With: Viscount Galway | Succeeded by William Gerard Hamilton; Viscount Galway |
| Preceded by Benjamin Way; Thomas Coventry | Member of Parliament for Bridport; 1768 – 1774; With: Thomas Coventry | Succeeded by Lucius Cary; Thomas Coventry |
