= William Capell, 4th Earl of Essex =

British landowner and peer

The Right Honourable The Earl of Essex
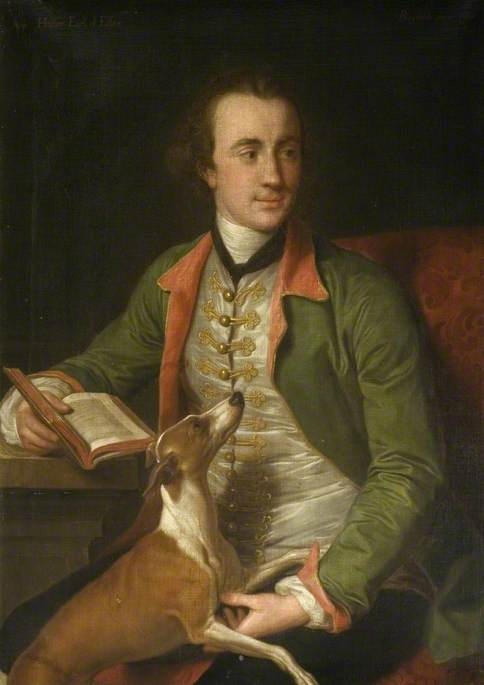
- Portrait by Pompeo Batoni

Master of the Staghounds
- In office 1770–1782
- Preceded by: The Viscount Galway
- Succeeded by: Post abolished

Personal details
- Born: William Anne Holles Capell; 7 October 1732 Turin
- Died: 4 March 1799 (aged 66) St James's Palace, Westminster
- Spouse(s): Frances Hanbury-Williams (m. 1754; died 1759) Harriet Bladen (m. 1767)
- Children: 7
- Parent(s): William Capell, 3rd Earl of Essex; Lady Elizabeth Russell
- Relatives: Algernon Capell, 2nd Earl of Essex (grandfather); Wriothesley Russell, 2nd Duke of Bedford (grandfather)

William Anne Holles Capell, 4th Earl of Essex (7 October 1732 – 4 March 1799), was a British landowner and peer, a member of the House of Lords.

== Early life ==
Capell was born on 7 October 1732 in Turin. He was the son of William Capell, 3rd Earl of Essex (1696–1743), by his second marriage, to Lady Elizabeth Russell. From his father's first marriage to Lady Jane Hyde (a Lady of the Bedchamber to the Princess of Wales and the third daughter of Henry Hyde, 4th Earl of Clarendon), he had several older half-sisters, including Lady Charlotte Capell (wife of Thomas Villiers, 1st Earl of Clarendon), and Lady Mary Capell (wife of Admiral of the Fleet John Forbes, second son of George Forbes, 3rd Earl of Granard).

His paternal grandparents were Algernon Capell, 2nd Earl of Essex and Lady Mary Bentinck (eldest daughter of William Bentinck, 1st Earl of Portland and Anne Villiers). His mother was a daughter of Wriothesley Russell, 2nd Duke of Bedford and the former Elizabeth Howland (daughter and heiress of John Howland of Streatham).

== Career ==
In January 1743, at the age of ten, he inherited his father's titles and estates. In 1753, at the age of twenty-one, he took his seat in the House of Lords. From 1755 to 1769, he was a Lord of the Bedchamber to King George II. He again served in this role for King George III from 1782 to 1799.

Lord Essex served as Lord Lieutenant of Hertfordshire from 1764 to 1771. In 1770, he was made the last Master of the Staghounds.

== Personal life ==
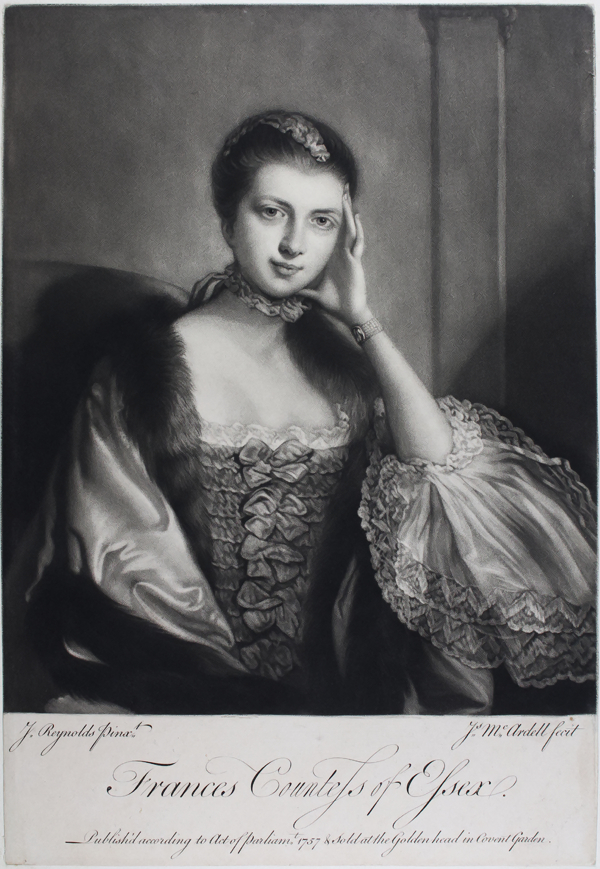
Frances Hanbury Williams, 1st wife of William Capell

On 1 August 1754, the Earl of Essex married, firstly, Frances Hanbury Williams, the daughter of Charles Hanbury Williams of Coldbroke and of Lady Francis Coningsby of Hampton Court Castle (a daughter and co-heiress of Thomas Coningsby, 1st Earl Coningsby).

By his first wife, he had three children (George and his sister Elizabeth were painted in a double-portrait by Sir Joshua Reynolds in 1768, now in the Metropolitan Museum of Art, New York):

- Lady Elizabeth Capell (1755–1834), who married John Monson, 3rd Baron Monson.
- George Capell-Coningsby, 5th Earl of Essex (1757–1839), who married two times.
- Lady Frances Capell (1759–1759), who died shortly after her mother gave birth to her in 1759.

Several years after his first wife's death in childbirth in 1759, he married, secondly, Harriet Bladen (1735–1821), on 2 March 1767. Harriet was the daughter of Colonel Thomas Bladen of Glastonbury Abbey, Somerset. By his second wife, he had four children:

- John Thomas Capell (1769–1819), who married Lady Caroline Paget, a daughter of Henry Paget, 1st Earl of Uxbridge and sister of Henry Paget, 1st Marquess of Anglesey., he was the father of Arthur Capell, 6th Earl of Essex
- Thomas Edward Capell (1770–1855), a general who died unmarried.
- William Robert Capell (1775–1854), who married Sarah Salter, only daughter of Samuel Salter of Rickmansworth, in 1802.
- Bladen Thomas Capell (1776–1853), the Vice-Admiral of the Blue who married Harriet Catherine Smyth, daughter of Francis George Smyth, in 1816.

Essex died on 4 March 1799 at St James's Palace, Westminster.

Honorary titles
Preceded by The Earl Cowper	Lord Lieutenant of Hertfordshire; 1764–1771	Succeeded by Viscount Cranborne
Political offices
Preceded by The Viscount Galway	Master of the Staghounds; 1770–1782	Office abolished
Peerage of England
Preceded by William Capell	Earl of Essex; 1743–1799	Succeeded by George Capell
