= George Morton Pitt =

British politician and colonial administrator

President of Fort St. George
- In office 14 May 1730 – 23 January 1735
- Preceded by: James Macrae
- Succeeded by: Richard Benyon

Personal details
- Born: 1693 Madras, South India
- Died: 9 February 1756 (aged 62–63) England

George Morton Pitt (1693 – 9 February 1756) was a British politician and colonial administrator who served as the president of Fort St. George from 1730 to 1735.

== Fort St George ==
George Morton hailed from the well-known Pitt family of England but had many links to his birthplace, Madras. Son of John Pitt, consul at Masulipatam, and his wife Sarah Charlton, he was a grandson of Edward Pitt and Rachel Morton. His mother was the widow of Thomas Wavell, second of council at Fort St George. His father-in-law was Charles Bugden, secretary of the East India Company at Fort St George.

After education in England he became a merchant at Fort St George. Briefly returning to England he became M.P. for Old Sarum in 1722 then vacated his seat to go back to Madras and take up an initial minor office with the East India Company in 1724 and was then to take up important and lucrative positions with them.
His appointments were: registrar of excise office, January 1724; second of council at Madras; deputy governor at Fort St David and finally governor of Fort St George 1730–1735.

Like his distant cousin, Thomas Pitt, he became Governor of the Madras Presidency at Fort St. George. He succeeded James Macrae in this post on 14 May 1730.

== President of Madras ==
Pitt became governor in 1730 when his predecessor James Macrae had to quit in ignominy after being accused of corruption. Pitt arrived at Madras from Fort St David on 14 May 1730 and immediately took over as president. He carried on the proceedings against Macrae. A few days after becoming president, he repealed the government prohibition on the export of silver introduced by Macrae.

To make up for the discrepancies in the coins issued by the British East India Company in comparison with those issued by the Nagapattinam mint, Pitt introduced a new coin equal in size, weight and quality with the Nagapattinam pagoda. This coin, which had the letter "M" punched on its to differentiate it from the Nagapattinam pagoda, was called a "M" pagoda.

During his presidency, the Dubashes or the chief merchants of the Company became powerful and influential. One of them, Alaganathan Pillai, built the Ekambareshwar Temple during Pitt's tenure. Another dubash, Sunkurama, had a garden at the bend of the Cooum river south of Periampet which was taken over by the British in 1735 for the construction of a new weaver's village called Chintadripet. By that time Sunkurama had fallen into disgrace and was succeeded by his colleague Thambu Chetty as the chief merchant. The Government resolved in October 1734 to erect a weaving town in the site of Sunkurama's garden and to permit only spinners, weavers, washers, painters and the necessary attendants of the temple to settle in the village. A cowl was granted on these terms and Bemala Audiappa Narayana helped in the peopling of the village, which grew to contain nearly two hundred and fifty families within two years after its foundation.

== London ==
Pitt resigned as governor in 1735 with a considerable fortune, purchased what later became known as Orleans House Twickenham from the estate of James Johnston who died in 1737 and bought in January 1740 burgages and freeholds from Sir William Lowther which with Lord Galway's interest gave complete control of the Pontefract seat. He held Pontefract until he chose to not stand for election in 1754 giving his seat to friend Sambrooke Freeman. Those Pontefract properties passed by remainder from his daughter Harriott to John Pitt (1704–1787), M.P. for Dorchester, who sold them in 1766.

He married 8 September 1743 Sophia Drake daughter of Charles Bugden of Fort St George and their only child, his daughter Harriott, married Brownlow Bertie but died aged 18 without surviving issue and his Twickenham estate went to his wife's daughter by her prior marriage to George Francis Drake, councillor and merchant of Madras, who married Sir George Pocock (1706–1792).

Parliament of Great Britain
Preceded by Robert Pitt; Sir William Strickland	Member of Parliament for Old Sarum; 1722–1724; With: Robert Pitt 1722; Thomas Pitt 1722–1726	Succeeded by John Pitt; George Pitt
Preceded by Sir William Lowther, Bt; 1st Viscount Galway	Member of Parliament for Pontefract; 1741–1754; With: 1st Viscount Galway 1734–147; William Monckton 1747–1749; 1st Viscount Galway 1749–1751; Robert Monckton 1751–1754	Succeeded by 2nd Viscount Galway; Sambrooke Freeman
