= William Curzon =

William Curzon (c. 1681–1749), of the Inner Temple, was a British lawyer and Tory politician who sat in the House of Commons from 1734 to 1741.

Curzon was the fourth son of Sir Nathaniel Curzon, 2nd Baronet of Kedleston Hall and his wife, Sarah Penn, daughter of William Penn of Penn, Buckinghamshire. He matriculated at Christ Church, Oxford on 25 June 1696, aged 15. He was admitted at Inner Temple and was called to the bar in 1705. In 1735, he became a bencher of his Inn.

At the 1734 British general election, Curzon was returned as a Tory Member of Parliament for Clitheroe by his brother, Sir Nathaniel Curzon, 4th Baronet. He was returned again at the 1741 British general election but was not put up in 1747. There is no record of his having voted in Parliament.

Curzon died unmarried on 24 June 1749, leaving a large fortune to his brother, Sir Nathaniel.

Parliament of Great Britain
Preceded by Thomas Lister I The Viscount Galway	Member of Parliament for Clitheroe; 1734–1747; With: Thomas Lister I 1734-1745; Thomas Lister II 1745-1747	Succeeded by Thomas Lister II; Nathaniel Curzon
