= Portrait of Mary Monckton =

Painting by Joshua Reynolds

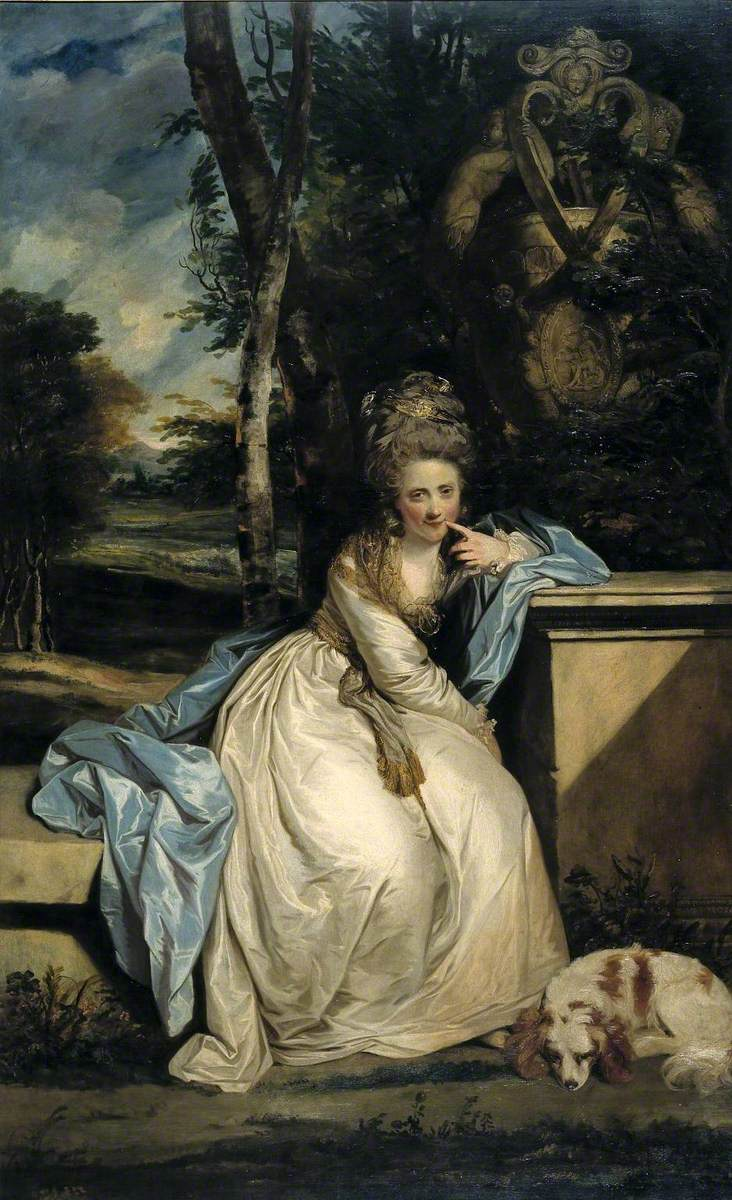
- Artist: Joshua Reynolds
- Year: c.1778
- Type: Oil on canvas, portrait painting
- Dimensions: 147.3 cm × 240 cm (58.0 in × 94 in)
- Location: Tate Britain, London

Portrait of Mary Monckton is a c.1778 portrait painting by the British artist Joshua Reynolds. It depicts the aristocrat Mary Monckton, the only daughter of Viscount Galway. The painting was commissioned by Monckton herself, and reflects her unconventional demeanour with a mischievous posture. She was known as a bluestocking and an associate of figures such as Edmund Burke, Richard Brinsley Sheridan and Sarah Siddons. She is shown accompanied by a pet King Charles Spaniel.

Later, after her marriage to the Anglo-Irish peer Edmund Boyle, 7th Earl of Cork, she became known as the Countess of Cork and became a celebrated society hostess of the Regency era. The painting is now in the collection of the Tate Britain, having been acquired by the nation in 1933. A mezzotint based on the picture was produced by Johann Jacobé and a separate engraving by Samuel William Reynolds.

== Bibliography ==
- Esposito, Donato. Sir Joshua Reynolds: The Acquisition of Genius. Sansom, 2009.
- McIntyre, Ian. Joshua Reynolds: The Life and Times of the First President of the Royal Academy. Allen Lane, 2003.
- Postle, Edward (ed.) Joshua Reynolds: The Creation of Celebrity. Harry N. Abrams, 2005.
