= Thomas Lister (British politician, born 1723) =

British landowner and Tory MP (1723–1761)

Thomas Lister (19 January 1723 – 29 November 1761), of Gisburne Park, Yorkshire, was an English landowner and Tory politician who represented Clitheroe in the House of Commons from 1745 until his death in 1761.

== Early life and education ==
Lister was the eldest son of Thomas Lister of Gisburne Park and Catherine Assheton, daughter and coheiress of Sir Ralph Assheton, 2nd Baronet, of Whalley Abbey. His mother died in 1728.

He was educated at Westminster School beginning in 1736 and entered Emmanuel College, Cambridge in 1742.

== Career ==
For most of the 18th century, the Listers and the Curzons of Gopsall Hall jointly controlled the borough of Clitheroe in the Ribble Valley, Lancashire.

His father represented Clitheroe in six parliaments, from 1713 until his death in 1745, at which point Thomas succeeded him. He held the seat for the next 16 years — being "of little consequence in the House of Commons" – until his own death in 1761.

His younger brother, Nathaniel Lister (1725–1793), then succeeded him, holding the seat until 1773 when Thomas' son and heir, Thomas, reached the age of 21.

== Marriage and issue ==
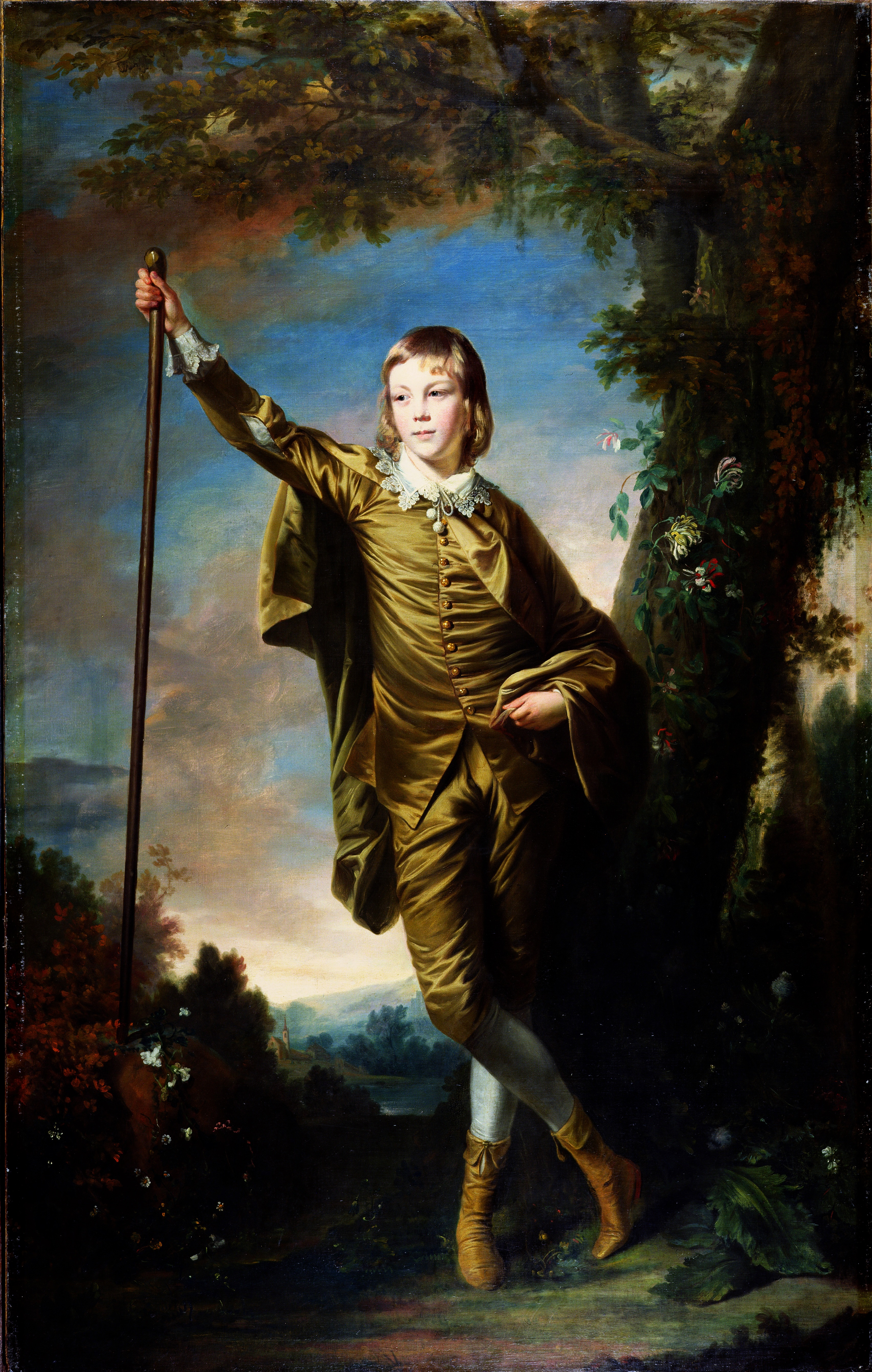
The Brown Boy by Joshua Reynolds, 1764

On 3 September 1748, Lister married Beatrix, daughter of Jessop Hulton of Hulton Park. They had one son and two daughters:

- Beatrix (1 November 1749 – 10 May 1807), married in 1778 John Parker, MP for Clitheroe; mother of the antiquarian Thomas Lister Parker
- Thomas Lister, 1st Baron Ribblesdale (1752–1826), represented Clitheroe between 1773–90 and was raised to the peerage as Baron Ribblesdale in 1797
- Katharine (5 August 1754 – 6 September 1762), died young

He died in 1761. His wife died in 1774.

Parliament of Great Britain
Preceded by Thomas Lister; William Curzon	Member of Parliament for Clitheroe; 1745–1761; With: William Curzon 1745–1747; Nathaniel Curzon 1747–1754; Assheton Curzon 1754–1761	Succeeded by Nathaniel Lister; Assheton Curzon
