= John Giles Eccardt =

German-born British painter

John Giles Eccardt (c. 1720 – 1779) was a German-born British painter who specialised in portrait painting. He came to England in the company of the French painter Jean-Baptiste van Loo for whom he worked as an assistant. When Van Loo left England, Eccardt remained and set up a portrait-painting business. In the following years he painted portraits of a number of leading members of British society, including twenty-six paintings of his chief patron Horace Walpole. Eccardt died in 1779.

== Gallery ==
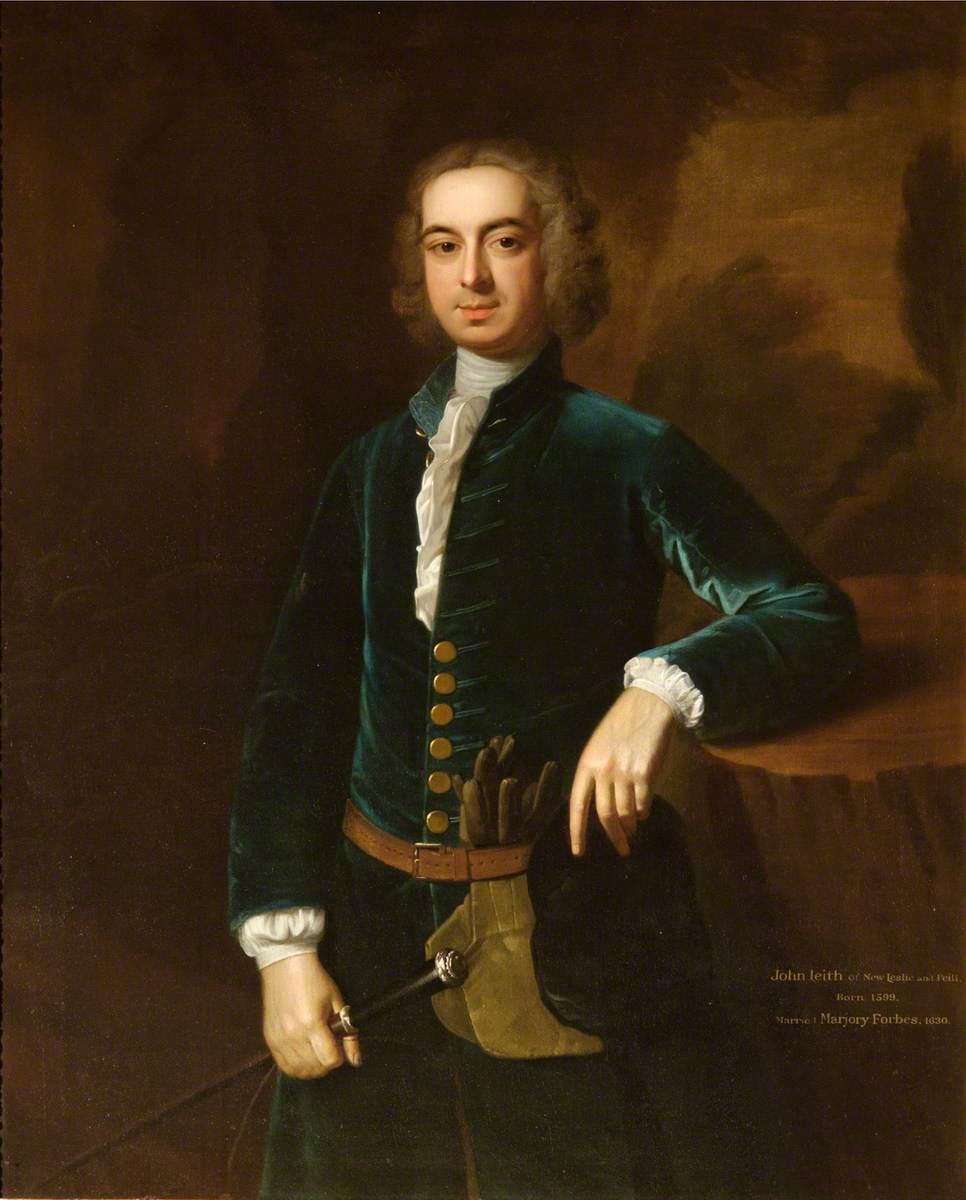
William Monckton-Arundell, 2nd Viscount Galway

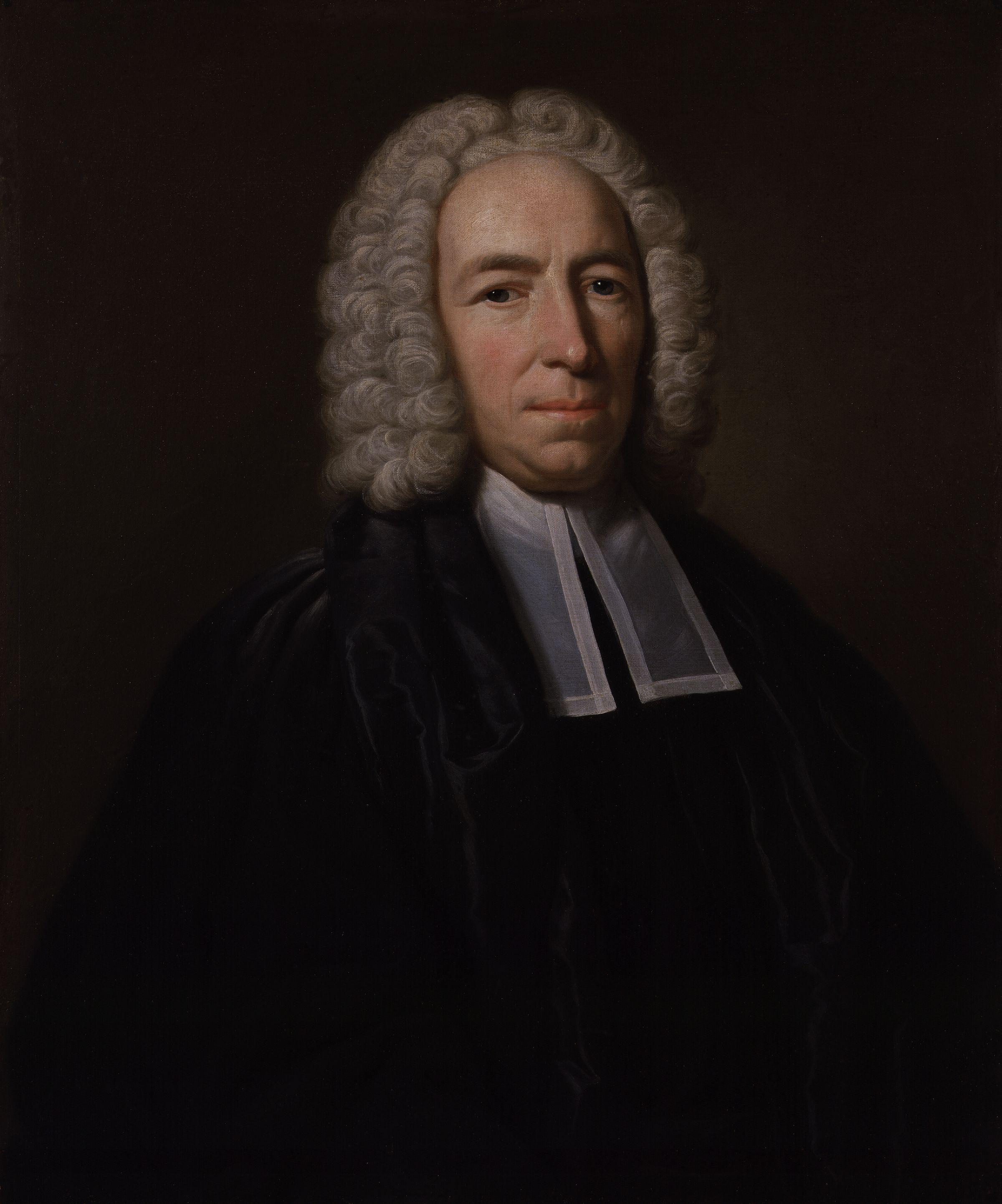
Conyers Middleton

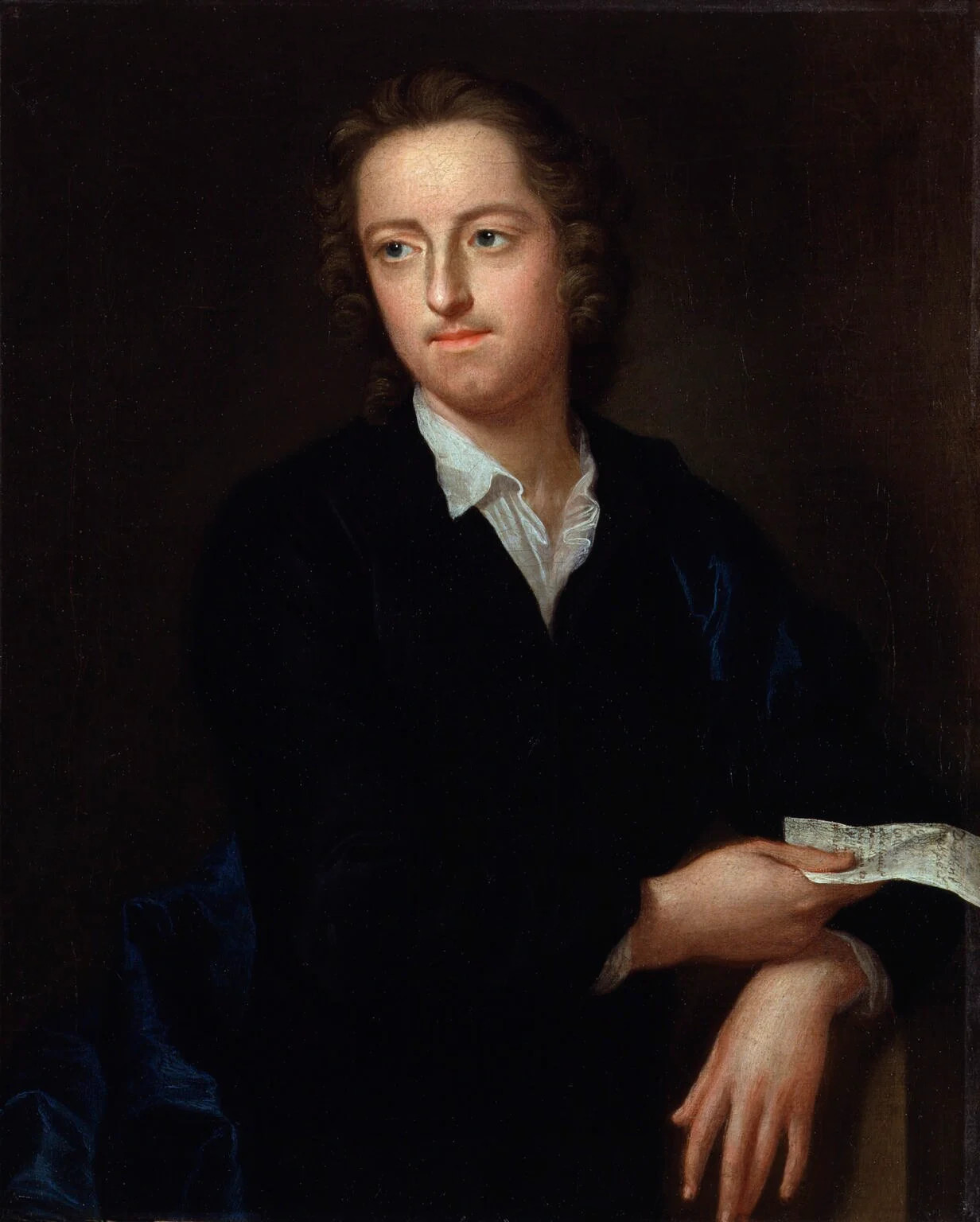
Thomas Gray

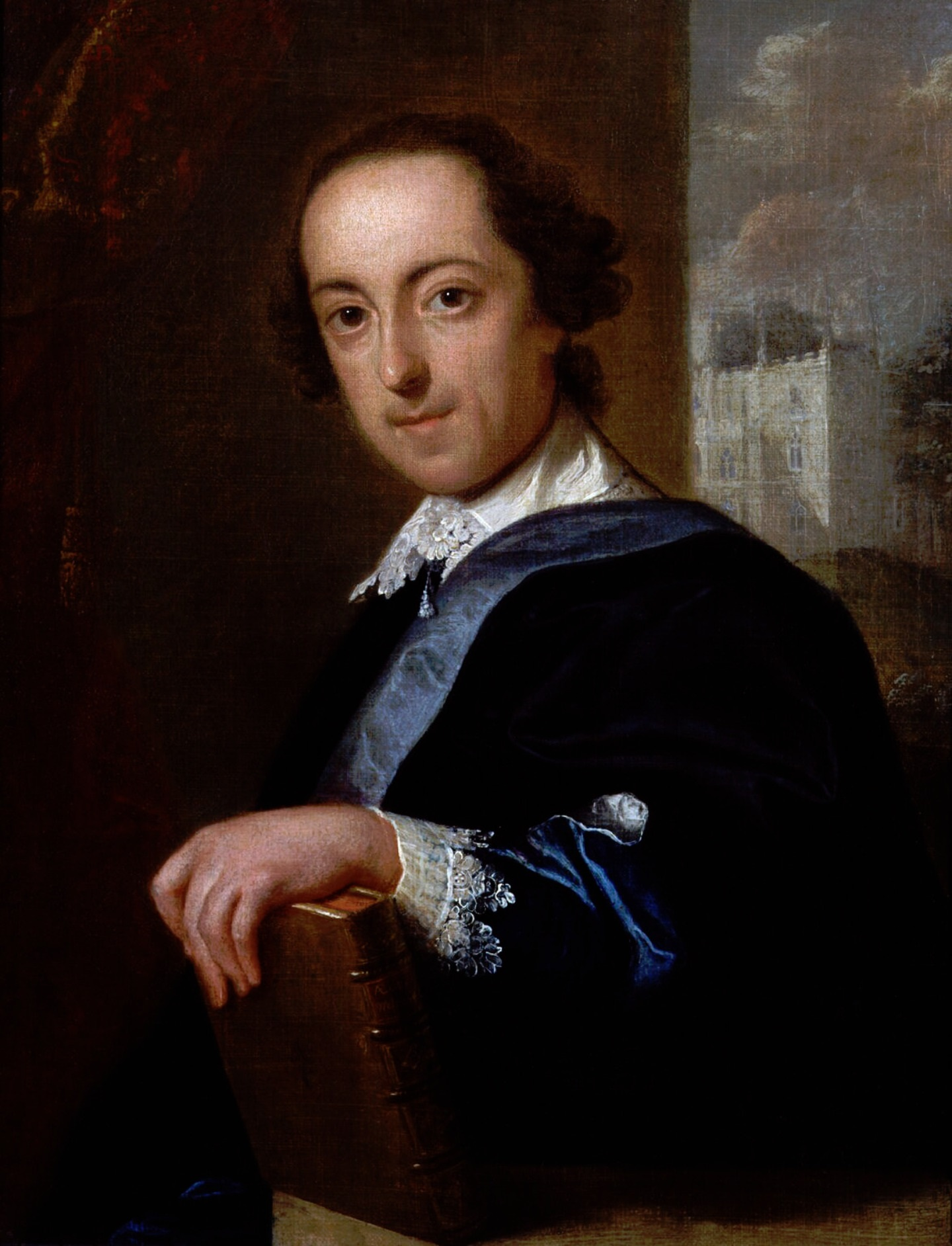
Horace Walpole

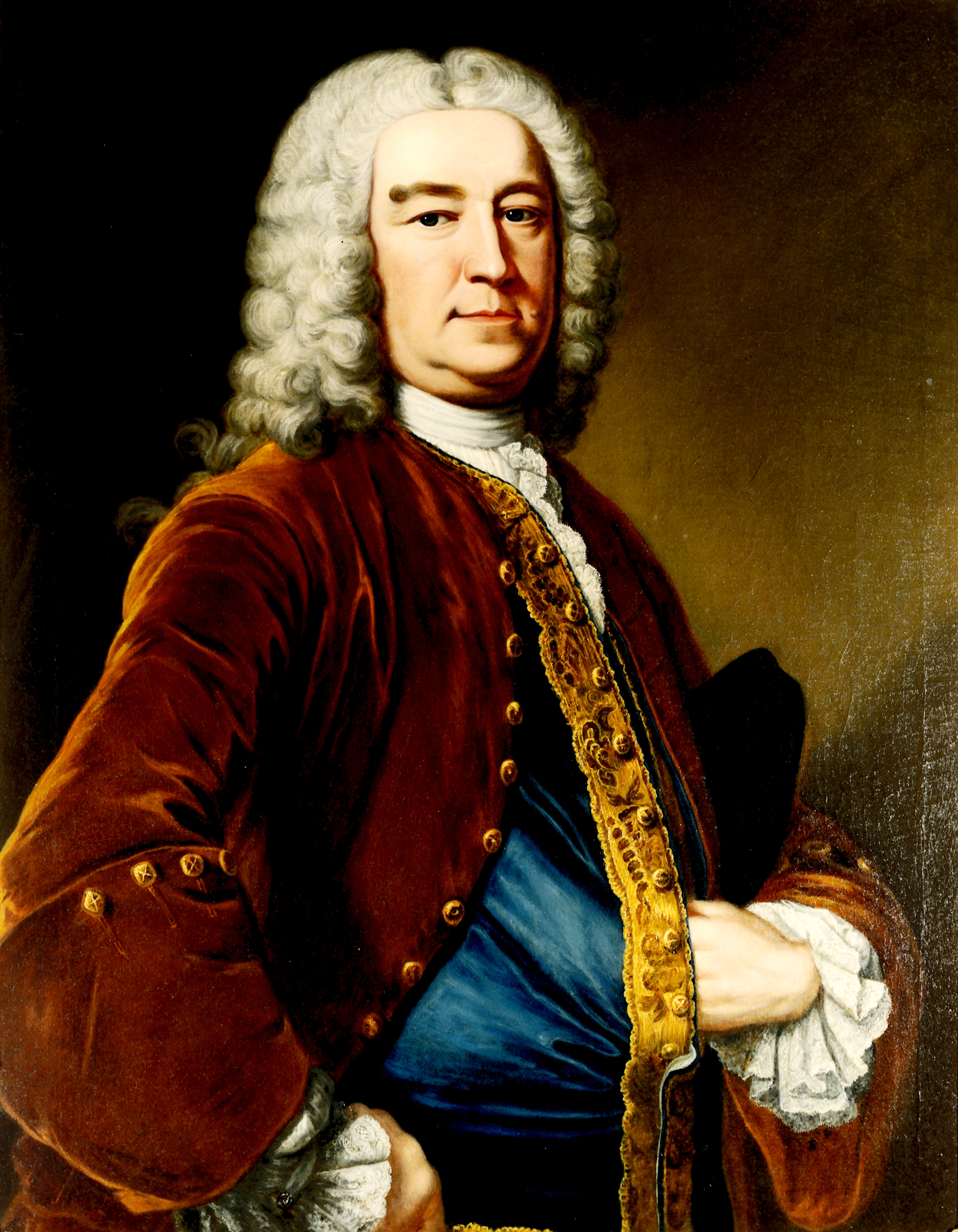
Henry Pelham
