= Elizabeth Capell, Countess of Essex (born 1704) =

The Countess of Essex
- Born: 1704
- Died: 8 June 1784 (aged 79–80)
- Spouse: William Capell, 3rd Earl of Essex
- Issue: William Capell, 4th Earl of Essex
- Father: Wriothesley Russell, 2nd Duke of Bedford
- Mother: Elizabeth Howland

Elizabeth Capell, Countess of Essex (1704 – 8 June 1784) was the second wife of William Capell, 3rd Earl of Essex, and the mother of William Anne Capell, 4th Earl of Essex.

== Biography ==
Lady Elizabeth was the daughter of Wriothesley Russell, 2nd Duke of Bedford, and his wife Elizabeth Howland.

William Capell, 3rd Earl of Essex, whose first wife Jane had died in 1724, married Elizabeth on 3 February 1726.

The couple had two sons and two daughters. The only one of them to survive infancy was William Anne (1732–1799), who would become the 4th Earl.

She died in June 1784, aged about eighty.

A portrait of the countess by Andrea Soldi is held by Watford Museum.
