= Edward Monckton =

English politician (1744–1832)

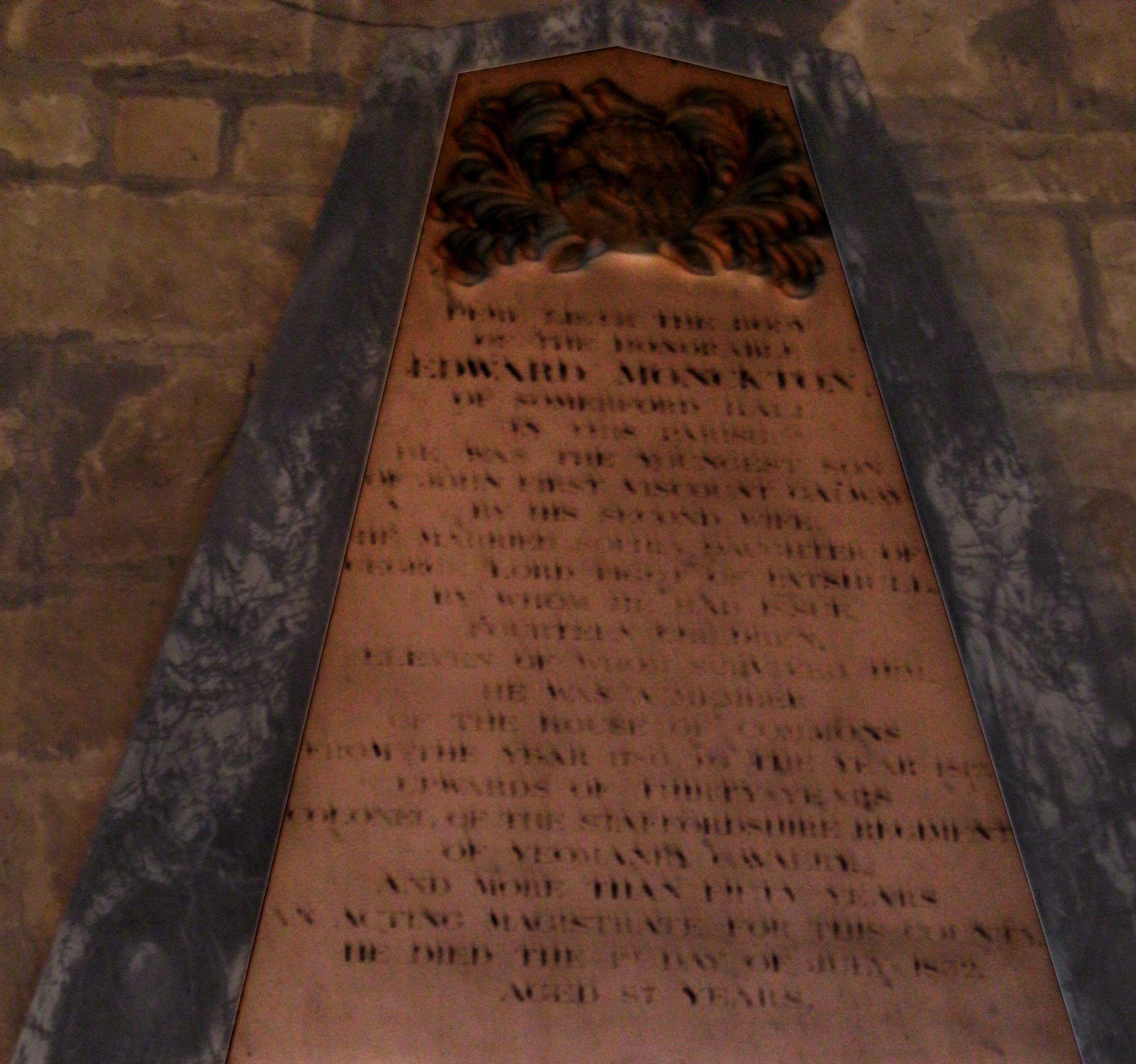
Memorial to Edward Monckton in Brewood parish church, Staffordshire

Edward Monckton (3 November 1744 – 1 July 1832) was a British colonial administrator and nabob, a Whig politician, a member of parliament for 32 years, and an important Staffordshire landowner.

== Background and early life ==
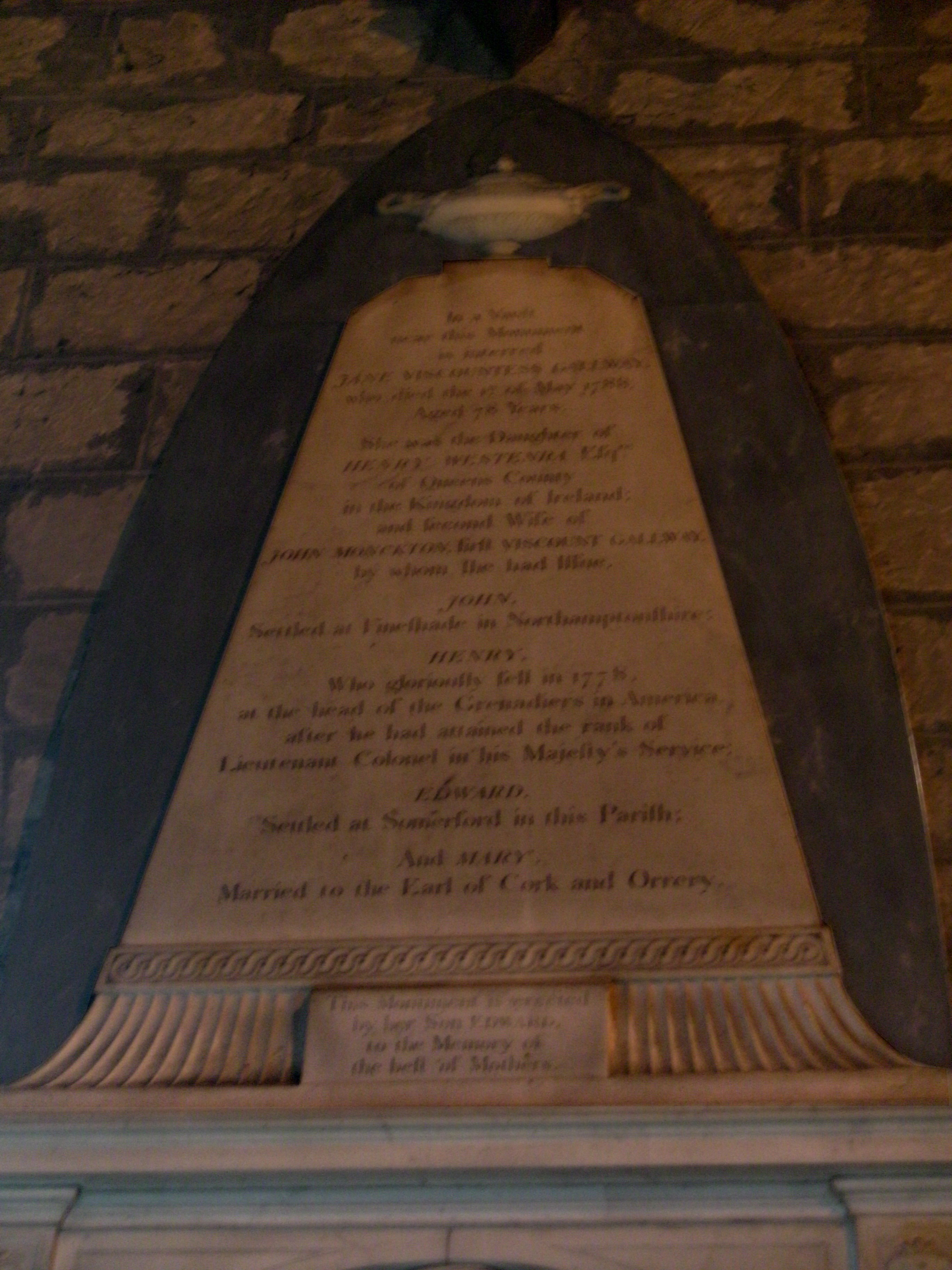
Memorial to Jane Westenra, with names of her husband and children, Brewood parish church

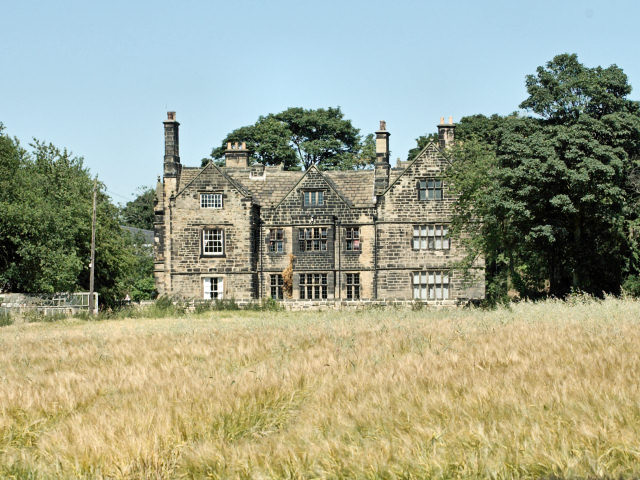
Hodroyd Hall, near Barnsley, seat of the Monckton family since the early 17th century.

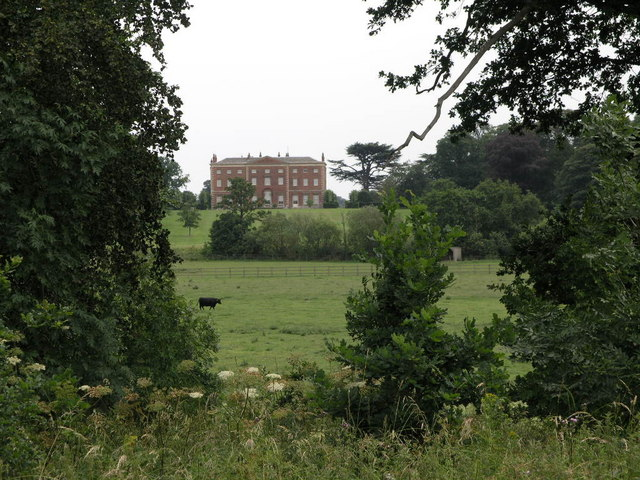
Serlby Hall. The 1st Viscount Galway's hall was replaced by William, the 2nd Viscount, who was largely responsible for the present building.

Monckton was the fifth surviving son of John Monckton, 1st Viscount Galway (1695–1751) by his second wife, Jane Westenra of Rathleague, Queen's County, Ireland, a relative of the Barons Rossmore. The distinguished soldier and colonial administrator Robert Monckton and William, the second Viscount, were older half-brothers, by Lady Elizabeth Manners, who died in 1730. The Viscount's Irish peerage was purely a convenient way of ennobling a government supporter while still allowing him to sit in the House of Commons. The family were of Yorkshire origin, based at Cavil, near Howden and Hodroyd, near Barnsley. The family borough was Pontefract, secured by the first Viscount's purchase of 77 burgages, and represented in Parliament by Moncktons for more than 70 years. The Viscount also extended the family's property by the building of a new seat: Serlby Hall in north Nottinghamshire.

Viscount Galway had married Jane Westenra in 1734 while serving as Commissioner of Revenue in Ireland. They had three surviving sons together, of whom Edward was the third, and a daughter. Edward's father died when he was six years old, although his mother survived until 1788. The children of the second marriage lived with Jane Westenra, who had a house in London where she often entertained Samuel Johnson, and where Edward's younger sister, Mary learned the skills of the literary hostess.

Monckton was educated at a private school in Chelsea, an area where there were many schools developing alternatives to public school education. As the younger son of an Irish peer, he was compelled to seek his own fortune. He entered the civil service of the East India Company at the age of 18. Such posts were awarded through patronage, not merit. They were in the gift of the company's Directors and were usually obtained through use of family and political contacts. They could be a source of great profit, although the legitimacy of some practices engaged in by company civil servants was debatable, He was sent to Madras, winter capital of the Madras Presidency and the life expectancy of Europeans in India was not high.

== India ==
Monckton was employed initially as a Writer, a junior clerk responsible for maintaining correspondence and accounts. He rose steadily through the ranks of the Company bureaucracy, becoming a factor in 1768, sheriff in 1770, junior merchant in 1771; assay master at the mint in 1773, and senior merchant in 1774. At the time of Monckton's posting, the Governor and Commander-in-Chief at Madras was George Pigot, a self-made man who had risen from the post of writer to total supremacy in the Presidency, holding it against the French in the Seven Years' War. Pigot returned to England in 1763, only a year after Monckton's arrival. Nevertheless, his career was to overshadow Monckton's own and to determine the general course of the remainder of his life in many ways.

Pigot was welcomed by the Whig government and loaded with honours: a baronetcy, closely followed by an Irish peerage. He set himself up at Patshull Hall, between Bridgnorth and Wolverhampton and became MP for Bridgnorth in 1768. However, his situation altered drastically in 1770, with the coming of the Tory ministry of Frederick North, Lord North, which was supported by George III. North's supporters sought to attack the Whigs by discrediting the record of their allies in the colonies, particularly Robert Clive. Pigot defended his friends and colleagues, not always temperately. Having alienated the ministry at home, Pigot then found that his financial position had deteriorated. Much of his wealth derived from an annual pension of 12,000 pagodas (about £4500) paid to him by the Nawab Muhammed Ali Khan Wallajah of Arcot for services rendered.

In 1772 Monckton was sent on a mission to the Sultanate of Kedah. The Nawab seems to have ceased his payments around 1773, forcing Pigot to return to paid employment. He was able to resume his old post at Madras after the Whig opposition demanded the Company reinstate him. He arrived in Madras in December 1775.

It was at this point that Monckton effectively staked his career on an alliance with Pigot, marrying Sophia, the governor's illegitimate daughter, on 14 March 1776. However, Pigot almost immediately precipitated a major political scandal that led to his own downfall. Reversing the company's policy of alliance with the Nawab of Arcot, Pigot declared the restoration of the Raja of Tanjore, whose property had been handed over to the Nawab. This opened up a rift between the governor and many on his council – a rift that rapidly widened as Pigot asserted his own interest in the Tanjore estates. Pigot's enemies carried out a coup d'état on 24 August 1776 and imprisoned him some miles from Madras. Both sides appealed to the Company in London. Pigot was declared reinstated but ordered to return to London. However, he died on 11 May 1777, still in confinement, before the judgement arrived in India.

Monckton resigned from the East India Company's service a few months later and returned to England in 1778. Within a year, he and Sophia had moved into Somerford Hall in Staffordshire, a few miles north-east of Patshull Park. A year after that Monckton was elected an MP for Stafford.

== Staffordshire estates ==
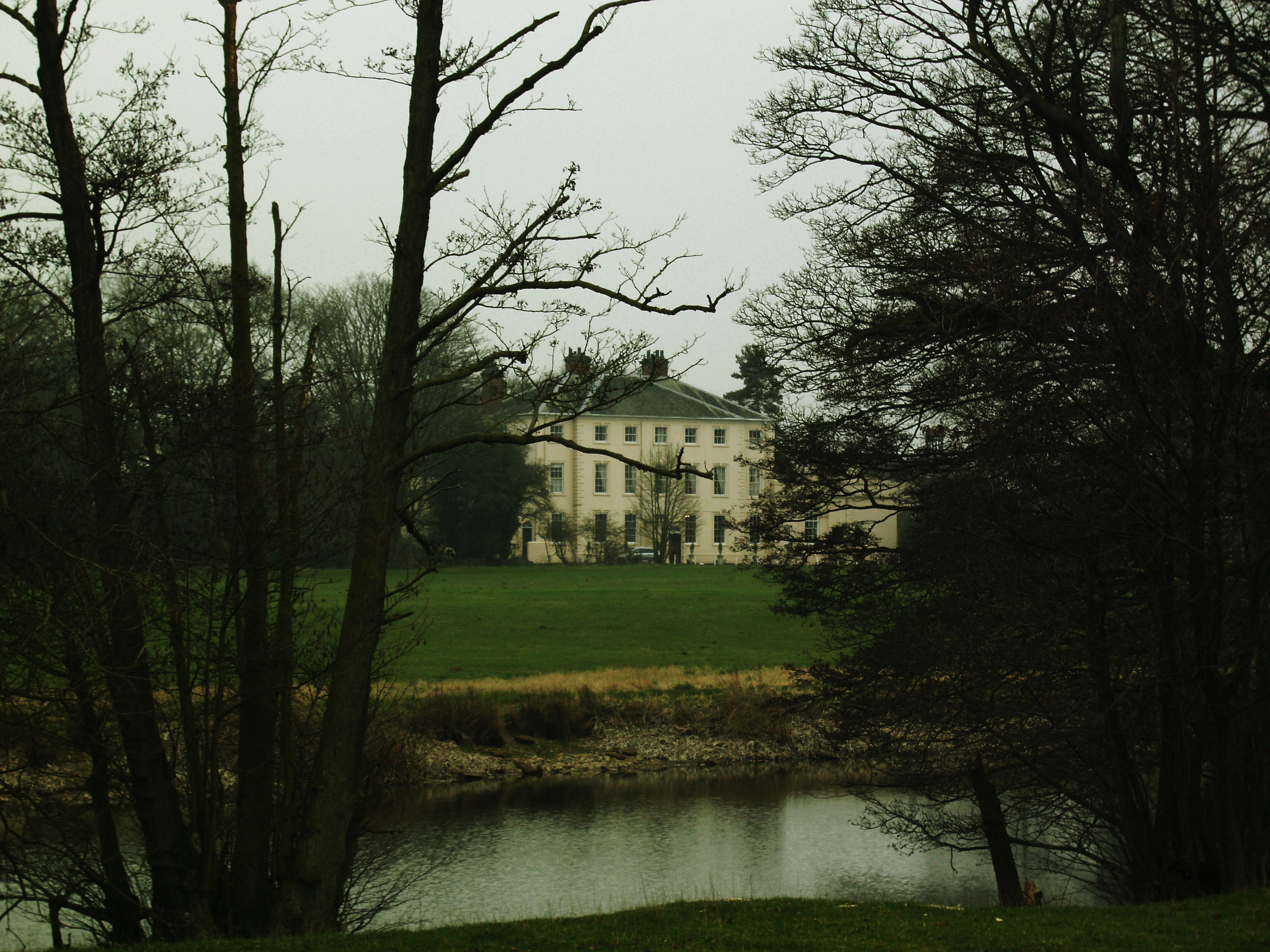
Somerford Hall, Monckton's home for over 50 years.

It is not clear whether Monckton had been negotiating for Somerford before the Pigot's fall, but it seems likely that the Pigot connection played some part in directing him to this part of Staffordshire, an area in which he had no previous interests. The children of the Viscount's first wife retained the Yorkshire and Nottinghamshire connections, while Edward's brother John had bought Fineshade Abbey in Northamptonshire. Somerford established a focus for this junior branch of the Monckton family. Edward's mother, Jane, the dowager Viscountess Galway, was buried in Brewood church in 1788, and so were Edward himself and Sophia in due course, and in 1840 Edward's younger sister Mary Boyle, Countess of Cork and Orrery. Monckton took a leading part in county life from the outset, becoming a Justice of the Peace and an officer in the Staffordshire Yeomanry, which he joined as Lieutenant-Colonel when it was raised on 20 September 1794, and which he commanded as Colonel from March 1800 until his retirement aged 86 in December 1829.

The Somerford estate had been bought in 1734 for £5,400 by Robert Barbor, of the Inner Temple, and he had erected a substantial Georgian house. Barbor had also bought the manor of Coven in 1744 and joined it with Somerford. Coven was rapidly transformed by the building of the turnpike road in the 1760s and the construction of the Staffordshire and Worcestershire Canal around 1770. Despite these economic advantages, Robert Barbor's descendants seem to have got into financial difficulties and were several times in danger of losing the house before Monckton bought it. The purchase of the Hall brought him both the manor of Somerford and that of Coven, together making up the south-eastern corner of Brewood parish.

Brewood parish was at that time an intensely conservative area, dominated by the Giffard family of Chillington Hall, a short distance south-west of Somerford. The Giffards were wealthy and had large holdings in land, but as Roman Catholics were excluded from public office by the Penal Laws, so their direct power never matched their influence. Most of their tenantry were Catholic too, while the other landowners and farmers were mainly Tory High Churchmen, worshipping at the parish Church of St. Mary and St. Chad, where they dominated the vestry. Monckton was an improving landlord with innovative schemes.

Monckton soon set about improving the house, having a large porch built and stucco applied to the walls. He planted large numbers of trees to replace the timber taken by the previous cash-strapped owners and then built or refurbished large numbers of farm buildings. A waterworks was installed on the nearby River Penk to bring water to the house, where it was stored in a rooftop reservoir, and the surplus from the system was run out into the gardens and grounds to water flowers and strawberry beds.

Monckton's improving zeal soon brought him into conflict with his neighbours, as the road from Brewood to Wolverhampton passed close to Somerford Hall and through its grounds, which Monckton was reforesting and improving. At a hotly contested vestry meeting in 1781 he tried to have it routed further south, to cross the Penk at Somerford Mill. The existing bridge at that point was of good quality but suitable only for foot traffic, and its maintenance was Monckton's responsibility. It emerged that, even if he paid for a new route, the cost of maintaining a new carriage bridge might in future fall on the parish, which the other members of the vestry refused to countenance. Later Monckton came up with a compromise scheme. He agreed to divert the road to the north of his property instead and paid for the construction of a new, straighter section to Four Ashes, on the main turnpike road between Wolverhampton and Stafford.

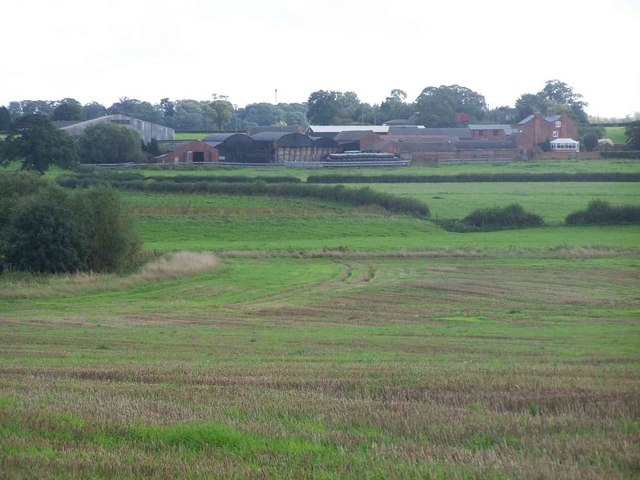
Engleton Hall, now a farmhouse on the right of the group, was built by Monckton on the site of an older hall.

Monckton soon began to extend his property interests in the area, buying several more estates in Brewood parish. First seems to have been Aspley, a small estate near Coven, on the bank of the canal, which he acquired shortly after Somerford itself. In 1780 he leased the Deanery Manor of Brewood from the Dean of Lichfield Cathedral, giving him land and houses around the centre of the town: this land was to remain leased by the Monckton family until 1903, after which they bought it outright. Monckton bought Engleton Hall, on the Penk north of Somerford, in 1785. Engleton Hall was intended as a home for Monckton heirs, starting with his son, also called Edward, but it was later let as a farm. With it came Brewood Hall, a substantial 17th century house on the eastern edge of Brewood, which Monckton earmarked in a jointure as a home for his wife after his death: in fact, Sophia never moved into it. The purchase did not include all of the Engleton estate, which had been divided in two as long ago as the 14th century, and Monckton was not able to purchase the rest of it until 1811.

== MP for Stafford ==
Monckton first contested the Stafford Borough constituency in the general election of 12 September 1780. Stafford was generally described as “venal” and it was very expensive to contest. This was because it was no longer a pocket borough, as it had been until a few years earlier, when it was controlled by the Chetwynds of Ingestre Hall. Around 1774, the Chetwynds had lost control, although family members would represent the borough again in the future, and the electorate, mostly tradesmen, were free to sell their vote to the highest bidder. It took 258 votes for Monckton to top the poll. Richard Brinsley Sheridan, standing jointly with Monckton as a Whig, got 248 votes and was declared Stafford's second MP, after apparently paying 5 guineas to each elector. Sheridan, a close friend of Mary Monckton, was to have a brilliant parliamentary, as well as literary, career but Monckton himself made a much slighter impression. Although he was to remain MP for Stafford for 32 years, 26 of them in harness with Sheridan, there is no record that he ever spoke in a debate, although he did attend frequently, took part in numerous divisions and was active for some years in Whig factional politics.

The overarching issue in the early years was the American Revolutionary War, which Britain was in the process of losing, and in which Monckton's brother Henry had been killed at the Battle of Monmouth in 1778. The war was rapidly eroding support for Lord North's ministry, and Monckton voted consistently against North's government in its dying days, siding with the Rockingham Whigs. However, Rockingham himself died shortly after replacing North in 1782. The new leader, Shelburne, failed to maintain Whig unity. Disputes focussed superficially on the ambiguity of Shelburne's peace manoeuvres, although there was actually a strong personal rivalry between Shelburne and the radical Charles James Fox. Both Monckton and Sheridan sided with the Foxite faction and voted against the Shelburne ministry on the peace negotiations, bringing it down in favour of a short-lived and unpopular Fox-North Coalition.

One of the coalition ministry's most important measures was an East India Bill, designed to nationalise the East India Company. Monckton, obviously an expert on the subject, voted for the bill on 27 November 1783. George III personally ensured that the bill was thrown out by the House of Lords, then dismissed the government and appointed William Pitt the Younger prime minister. Monckton and Sheridan were returned unopposed in the ensuing general election, probably because their wealth made a contest pointless. However, large numbers of Whigs lost their seats, becoming known as "Fox's Martyrs", and Pitt was able to form a secure Tory administration.

Over the next few years, Monckton consistently voted against Pitt's ministry. He joined the Whig Club on 4 April 1785. The Whig party was increasingly divided between the rump of the Foxite faction and a mainstream grouping around William Cavendish-Bentinck, 3rd Duke of Portland The Portland Whigs made overtures to Monckton and he met with them on 11 May 1790. He and Sheridan again topped the poll at Stafford in the general election of June 1790, with exactly 264 votes each. Monckton's acceptance into the Whig elite was formalised by membership of Brooks's Club, for which he was sponsored by Portland himself on 7 February 1791.

The outbreak of the French Revolution in 1789 was already causing internal schism and regrouping among the Whigs, but for some time Monckton continued to vote for radical and liberal measures and against the government. In April 1791 he supported repeal of the Test Act in Scotland, a measure intended to begin the process of restoring civil rights to Roman Catholics and Nonconformists. On 1 March 1792 he voted with the Whigs against the government's intervention on the Ottoman side in the Russo-Turkish War. However, with most of the Portland Whigs, he supported the government's entry into the French Revolutionary Wars, while the Foxites continued to oppose war. In 1794, Portland accepted the post of Home Secretary from Pitt. Thereafter, the Portland Whigs disappeared as a distinct faction Portland was considered a Tory, although he was to prove a rallying point within the party for dissident, liberal Tories like George Canning.

Monckton too tended to support the government throughout the French Revolutionary and Napoleonic Wars. However, he took an independent line on many issues. In 1803 he supported John Calcraft's defence of the Prince of Wales's financial position: the Prince was closely associated with the Whig opposition. He also gave general support to Ministry of All the Talents, headed by the Whig Grenville during 1806–7. However, he contacted Speaker Abbot, a Tory who was popular with all parties, to assure him of support should the ministry try to dislodge him. He sided with the Whigs throughout the Regency crises of 1810 and 1811, but voted against Parliamentary reform in 1810.

Monckton was returned unopposed, with Sheridan, in 1796 and 1802. In 1806 and 1807 he was elected alongside Richard Mansel Philipps, a radical Whig who was soon mired in scandal over debt and fraud. In 1812 Monckton announced his retirement from Parliament and did not stand for election again.

== Later years ==
Monckton devoted his final two decades to his estates and life in Staffordshire. He was an active and enthusiastic Justice of the Peace . In June 1829, as Magistrate for Staffordshire he prevented a prize-fight (boxing match) happening between Phil Sampson and Simon Byrne at Bishops Wood by arresting the carpenter in charge of building the stage. The following day, as he would not be persuaded to allow the fight to take place, it was moved as short distance west to a field owned by Richard Jones of Offoxey Farm (aka Huncott or Hunkit) in Tong parish He was the longest serving member of the Staffordshire bench when he died. His estates largely prospered, particularly Coven, which saw the beginning of population growth that would turn it into a substantial village by mid-century. The first Wesleyan Methodist church in the parish was built there in 1828, probably an indication of Monckton's proven tolerance in religious matters.

On his death, Monckton was succeeded in his estates by his son Edward. He left his Carnatic stock to be invested for the instruction of the people of Madras in Christianity.

== Family ==
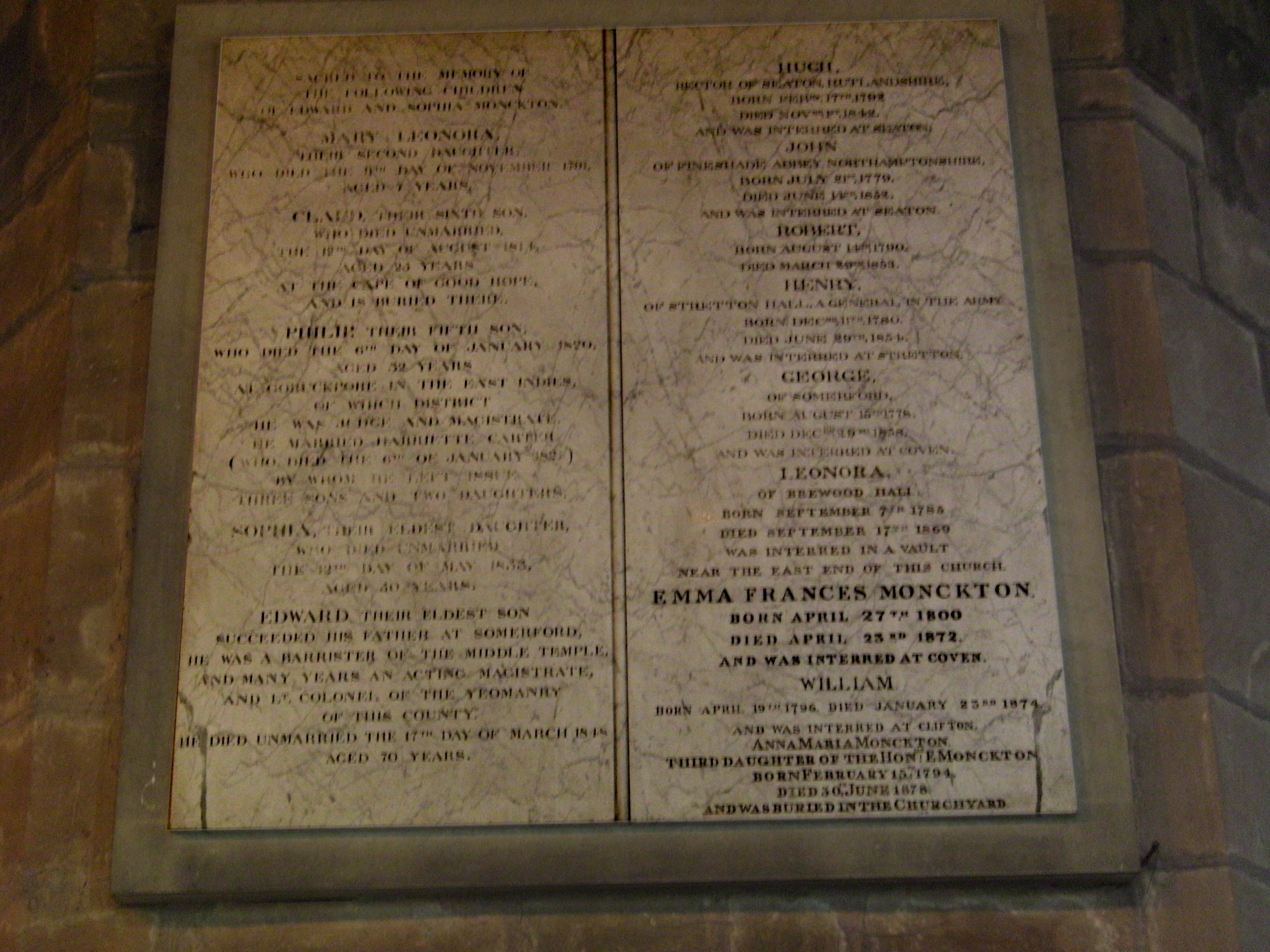
Memorial to the children of Edward and Sophia Monckton, Brewood.

Edward Monckton was married only once: to Sophia, the illegitimate daughter of George Pigot. Sophia died in 1834. Together they had 14 children and all but one survived into adulthood. These included his heir, also called Edward, who died unmarried and childless in 1848; Henry, who became a general in the army, extended the family estates by buying Stretton Hall, Staffordshire, and inherited the remainder on the death of his brother; and John, who inherited his uncle's seat of Fineshade Abbey.
