= John Monckton, 1st Viscount Galway =

British politician (1695–1751)

The Right Honourable The Viscount Galway

Member of Parliament for Pontefract
- In office 1749–1751 Serving with George Morton Pitt
- Preceded by: George Morton Pitt; William Monckton
- Succeeded by: George Morton Pitt; William Monckton
- In office 1734–1747 Serving with Sir William Lowther, 2nd Baronet, George Morton Pitt
- Preceded by: Sir William Lowther, 2nd Baronet; John Mordaunt
- Succeeded by: George Morton Pitt; William Monckton

Member of Parliament for Clitheroe
- In office 1727–1734 Serving with Thomas Lister
- Preceded by: Thomas Lister; Nathaniel Curzon
- Succeeded by: Thomas Lister; William Curzon

Personal details
- Born: c. 1695
- Died: 15 July 1751 (aged 55–56)
- Party: Whig
- Spouses: Lady Elizabeth Manners (died 1730) Jane Westenra (m. 1734)
- Children: William Monckton-Arundell, 2nd Viscount Galway; Robert Monckton; John Monckton; Henry Monckton; Edward Monckton; Mary Boyle, Countess of Cork and Orrery
- Parent(s): Robert Monckton; Theodosia Fountaine
- Education: Trinity Hall, Cambridge

John Monckton, 1st Viscount Galway (c. 1695 – 15 July 1751) was a British Whig politician who sat in the House of Commons of Great Britain from 1727 to 1751. He was elevated to the peerage of Ireland as the first Viscount Galway in 1727.

== Early life ==
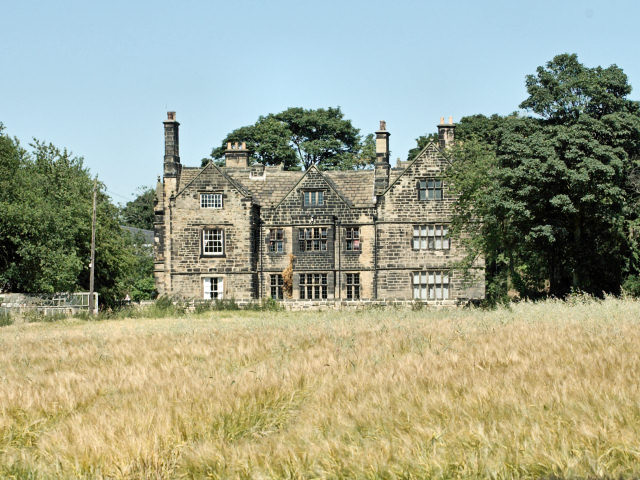
Hodroyd Hall, near Barnsley, seat of the Monckton family since the early 17th century.

John Monckton was the eldest son of Theodosia (née Fountaine) Monckton and Robert Monckton (1659–1722), Lord of the manors of Cavil, near Howden, and Hodroyd, near Barnsley, Yorkshire. A strong opponent of the policies of James II, Robert Monckton had gone into exile in the Netherlands and returned with the invading army of William III in the Glorious Revolution of 1688. This established a strong family connection with the Whig party and Robert had gone on to win the borough of Pontefract from the Tories in the general election of 1695, and later to represent Aldborough.

His father was the eldest son of Sir Philip Monckton of Cavil and the former Anne Eyre (a daughter of Robert Eyre of Highlow Hall). His mother was the daughter and heiress of John Fountaine of Melton-on-the-Hill, Yorkshire.

Monckton was educated at Trinity Hall, Cambridge, which he entered in 1713.

== Career ==
Monckton stood unsuccessfully as a Whig candidate for Clitheroe at the 1722 British general election. Victory in the seat depended on control of burgages. Having bought a number of burgages to no effect, Monckton decided to sell them to Sir Nathaniel Curzon, one of the victorious Tory candidates. As part of the deal, Curzon deferred to Monckton for the following parliament, and he was duly elected MP for Clitheroe at the 1727 British general election. On 17 July 1727 the grateful Whig government of Robert Walpole made Monckton Viscount Galway and Baron of Killard, both in the Irish peerage. An Irish peerage allowed the holder to continue sitting in the British parliament, and was a way of honouring a useful political ally.

In 1729 Galway purchased 77 burgages in Pontefract, his father's former constituency, for £6000 from the Bland, Dawnay, Frank families. This placed himself and Sir William Lowther in joint control of the borough and they agreed to nominate a member each at subsequent elections. When Galway's tenure at Clitheroe elapsed at the 1734 British general election, he was elected MP for Pontefract, along with Lowther. Subsequently, he profited from offices in the patronage of the government. In 1734, he was appointed Commissioner of Revenue in Ireland, a post he held until 1748. He was returned again for Pontefract at the 1741 British general election, but at the 1747 British general election, he ceded it to his eldest son. He was returned again for Pontefract at a by-election on 5 January 1749, in order to acquire another profitable post which required him to be an MP.

In 1749 Monckton was recommended for the post of Surveyor-General of Lands, Woods and Forests in England and Wales by the Prime Minister, his brother-in-law, Henry Pelham. Writing to his brother, the Duke of Newcastle, Pelham pointed out that "the great expense he has been at in bringing himself in, and, at last, his purchasing a borough are merits we don't meet with every day."

Galway held the post of Surveyor General and the Pontefract constituency until his death in 1751.

== Personal life ==
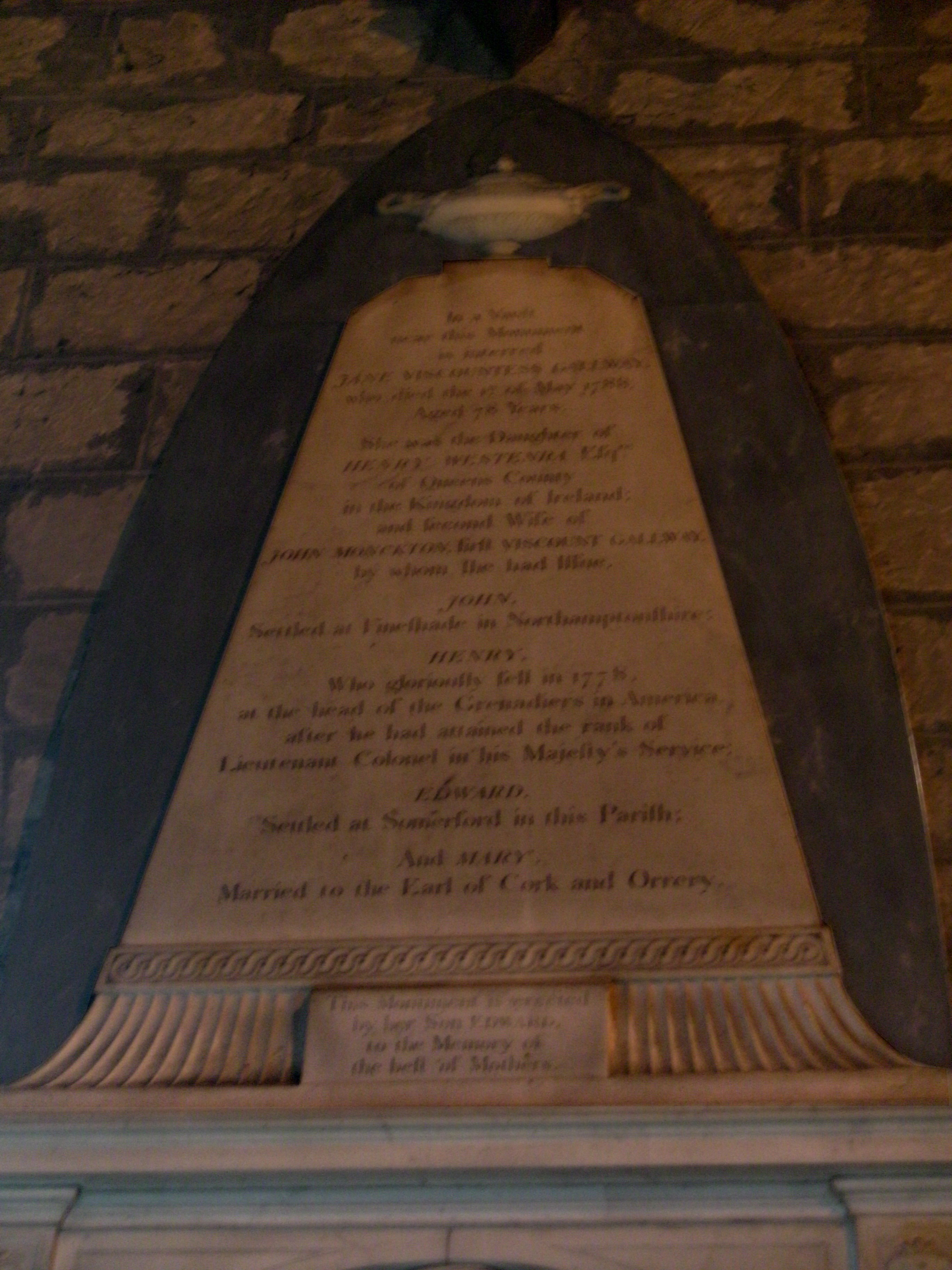
Memorial to Jane Westenra and her children, Brewood parish church, Staffordshire.

Monckton's first wife was Lady Elizabeth Manners (1709–1730), daughter of John Manners, 2nd Duke of Rutland and the former Catherine Russell (daughter of William Russell, Lord Russell and Lady Rachel Wriothesley). Before her death on 22 March 1730, they were the parents of:

- William Monckton-Arundell (1725–1772), later 2nd Viscount Galway.
- Robert Monckton (1726–1782), notable Army General and colonial administrator; he never married, but was survived by three sons and a daughter.

Galway married as his second wife Jane Westenra, daughter of Henry Warner Westenra of Rathleagh, Queen's County, Ireland in November 1734. Together, they were the parents of:

- John Monckton (1739–1830), of Fineshade Abbey, Northamptonshire.
- Henry Monckton (1740–1778), a notable army officer killed at the Battle of Monmouth, New Jersey.
- Edward Monckton (1744–1832), of Somerford, Staffordshire, an MP for 32 years; he married Sophia, the illegitimate daughter of George Pigot.
- Mary Monckton (1748–1840), a notable literary and political hostess who married Edmund Boyle, 7th Earl of Cork.

Lord Galway died on 15 July 1751. Lady Galway survived him until 1788.

=== Estates ===
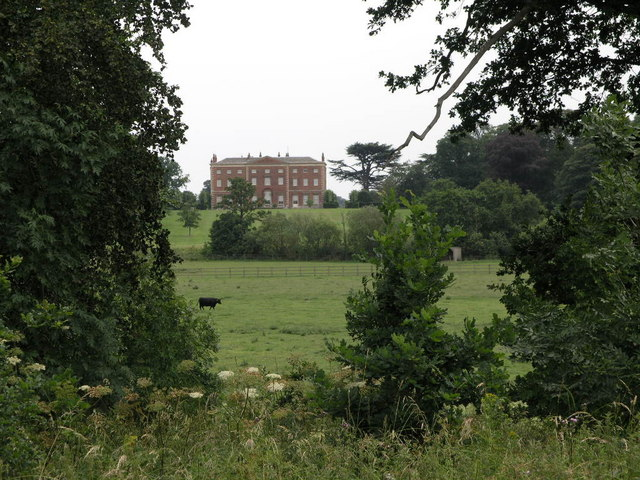
Serlby Hall. The 1st Viscount Galway's hall was replaced by William, the 2nd Viscount, who was largely responsible for the present building.

Upon his father's death in 1722, Monckton inherited the family estate of Hodroyd Hall which had been the seat of the Moncktons since the early 17th century. In 1725 he purchased the Serlby estate in North Nottinghamshire and began the building of the new family seat of Serlby Hall, where he built up a notable collection of paintings. He was a member of the Society of Dilettanti.

Parliament of Great Britain
Preceded by Thomas Lister; Nathaniel Curzon	Member of Parliament for Clitheroe; 1727–1734; With: Thomas Lister	Succeeded by Thomas Lister; William Curzon
Preceded by Sir William Lowther, 2nd Baronet; John Mordaunt	Member of Parliament for Pontefract; 1734–1747; With: Sir William Lowther, 2nd Baronet 1734-1741; George Morton Pitt 1741-1747	Succeeded by George Morton Pitt; William Monckton
Preceded by George Morton Pitt; William Monckton	Member of Parliament for Pontefract; 1749–1751; With: George Morton Pitt	Succeeded by George Morton Pitt; William Monckton
Peerage of Ireland
New creation	Viscount Galway; 1727–1751	Succeeded by William Monckton-Arundell
