= Mary Boyle, Countess of Cork and Orrery =

Anglo-Irish hostess of literati (1746–1840)

Mary Boyle
- Countess of Cork and Orrery
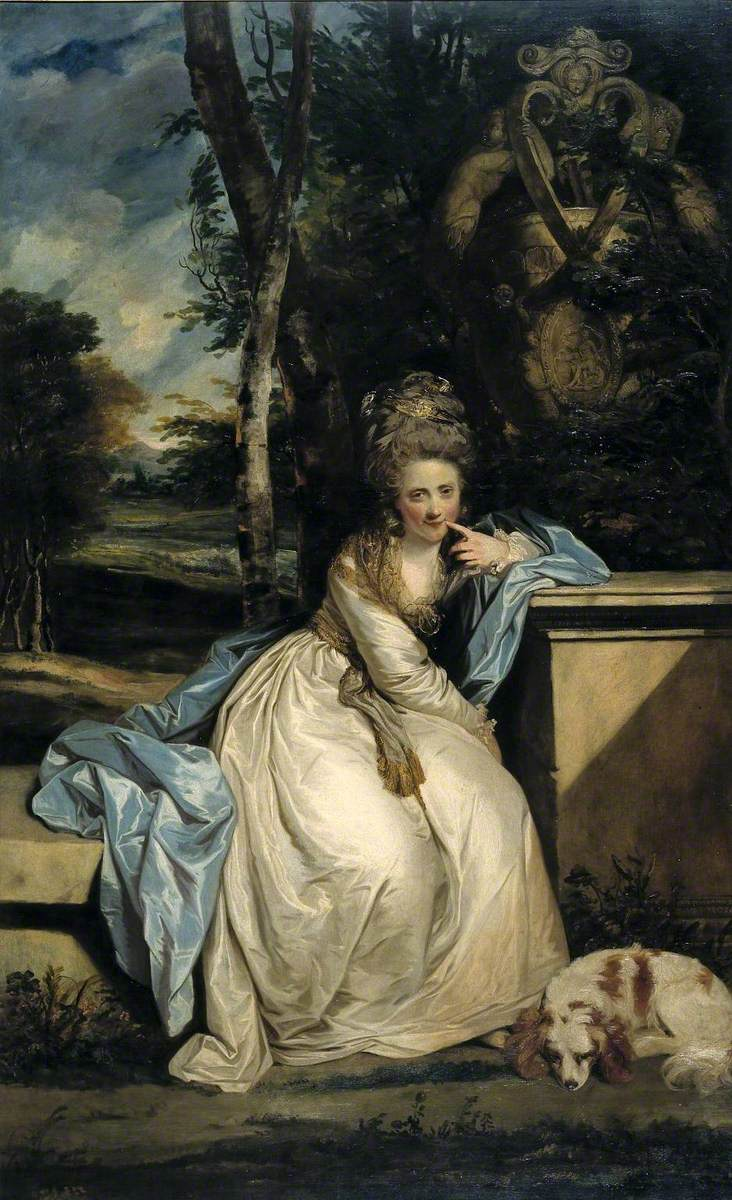
- Portrait of Mary Monckton by Sir Joshua Reynolds, c.1777–1778
- Tenure: 1786-1840
- Known for: Literary hostess
- Born: Mary Monckton; 21 May 1746
- Died: 30 May 1840 (aged 94)

Mary Boyle, Countess of Cork and Orrery (21 May 1746 – 30 May 1840) was an Anglo-Irish literary hostess.

== Life ==
Born Mary Monckton, probably at Serlby Hall, Nottinghamshire, the family seat, she was a daughter of John Monckton, 1st Viscount Galway by his second wife, Jane Westenra of Rathleagh, Queen's County, Ireland. Boswell places Mary Monckton among the bluestocking clubs, and writes:

Johnson was prevailed with to come sometimes into these circles, and did not think himself too grave even for the lively Miss Monckton (now Countess of Corke), who used to have the finest bit of blue at the house of her mother, Lady Galway. Her vivacity enchanted the Sage, and they used to talk together with all imaginable ease.

She used to divide her hosted salons after colors and the invited guests, blue (literary persons), pink (fashionable persons) and gray (religious persons).

The playwright Richard Brinsley Sheridan was a close friend and regular visitor: in the 1780 general election he stood jointly in the Whig interest with Mary's brother Edward and was elected 2nd Member for Stafford. In 1786, she became the second wife of Edmund Boyle, 7th Earl of Cork and 7th Earl of Orrery. The earl had divorced his first wife Anne Courtenay in 1782, and it was rumored that a foundling Fanny Williams ,raised by Lady Amherst was their love-child.

Politically, there was never any doubt of her sympathies: although brother Edward wavered, Mary still signed herself "a True Whig" into old age.

She was also a patron of the opera singer Teresa Cornelys, which at one of the masked balls she appeared as "an indian sultana" and wearing jewels to the value of £30,000.

Several of Georgette Heyer's historical novels refer to the fame of her literary parties: in Venetia (1958), Lord Damerel states that one of his aunts considers herself "a second Lady Cork, to whose salons it is an honor to be invited", although she is further described as "very disagreeable".

== Death ==
She died in London on 30 May 1840. She was ninety-four. She was buried in Brewood parish church, Staffordshire, close to the estates of her brother, Edward Monckton.

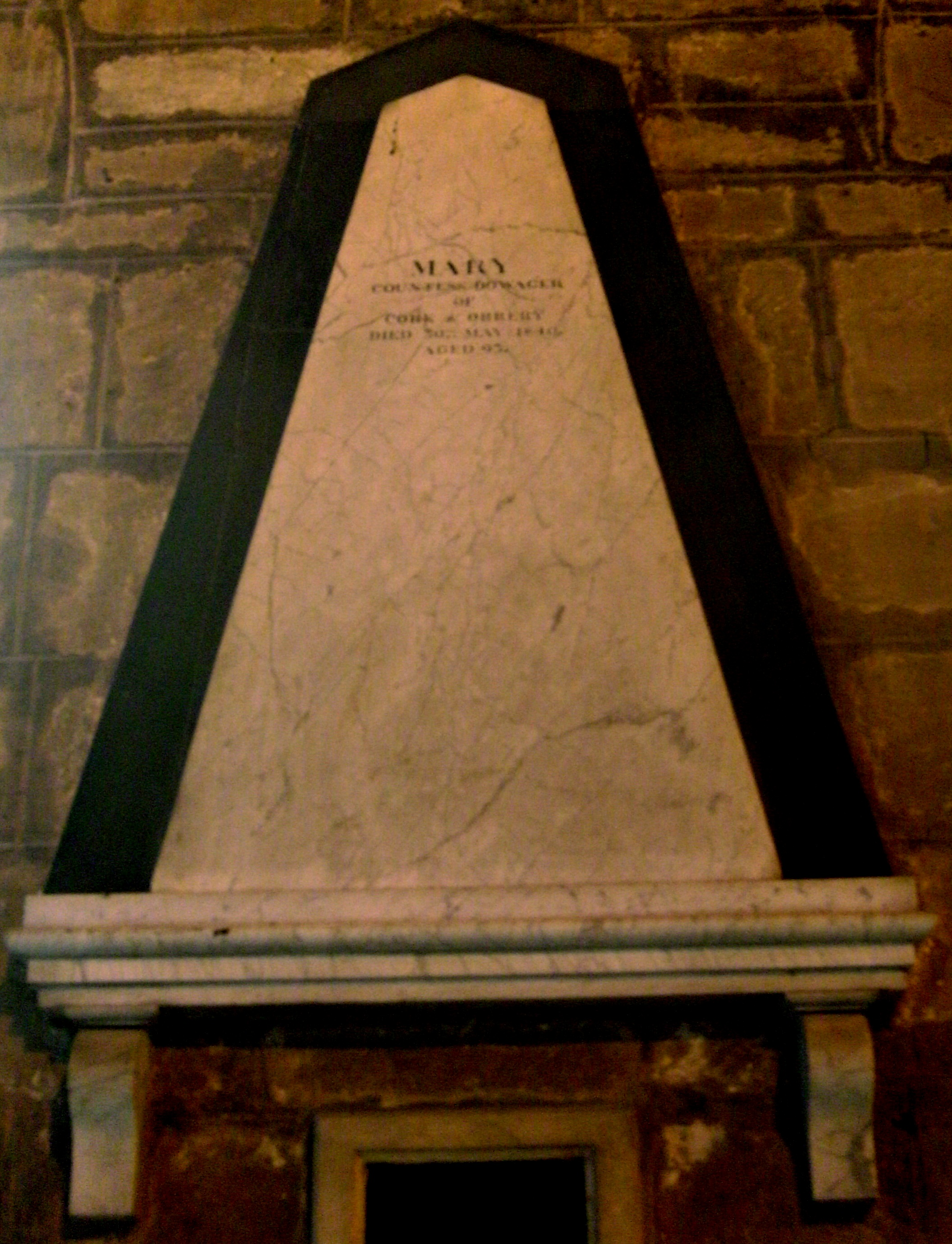
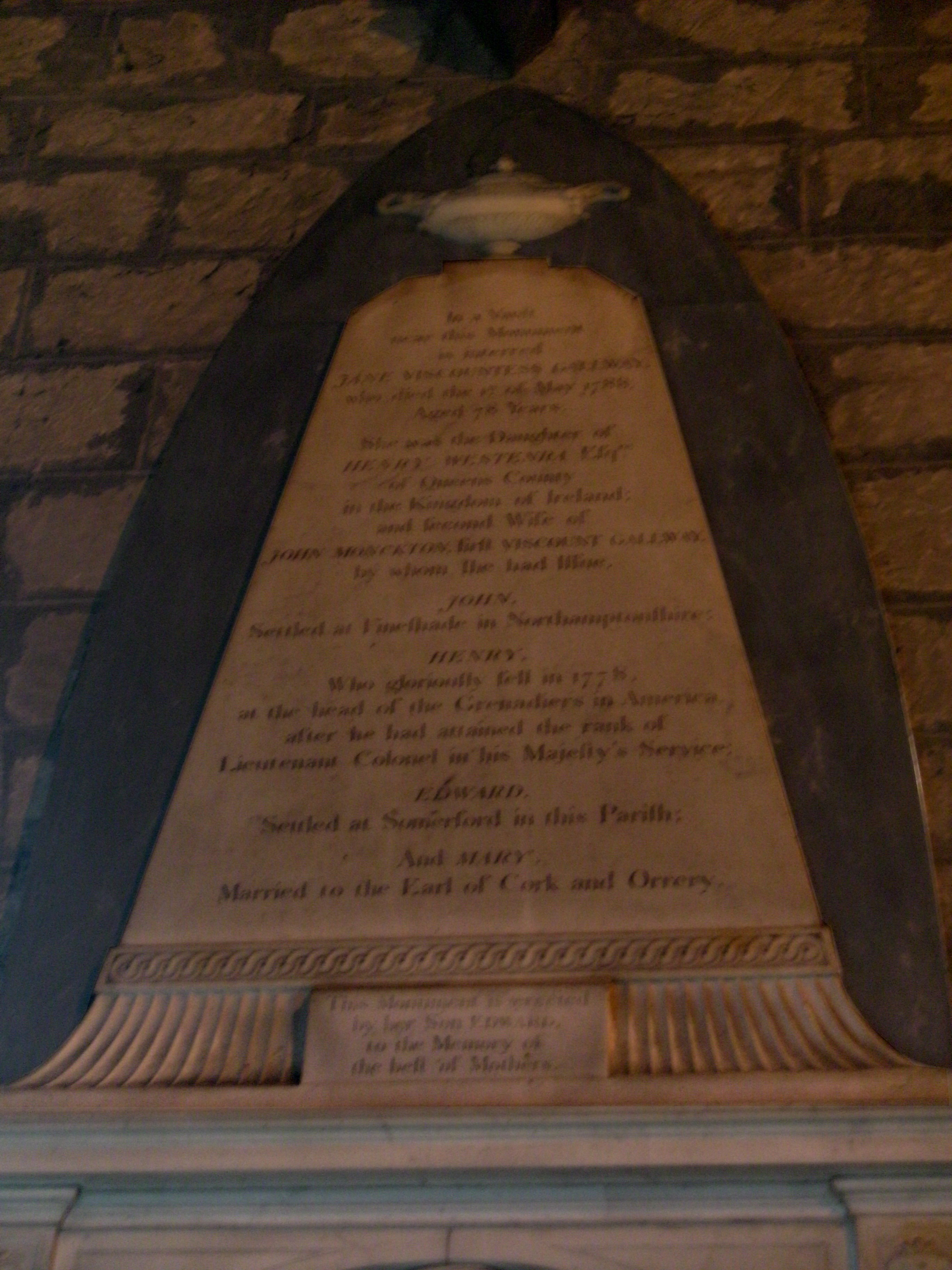
Memorial to Lady Cork's mother Jane Westenra, Brewood parish church, Staffordshire.

== Sources ==
Attribution

- This article incorporates text from a publication now in the public domain: Lee, Elizabeth (1894). "Monckton, Mary". In Lee, Sidney (ed.). Dictionary of National Biography. Vol. 38. London: Smith, Elder & Co.
