= 1890 =

1890 in various calendars
- Gregorian calendar: 1890; MDCCCXC
- Ab urbe condita: 2643
- Armenian calendar: 1339; ԹՎ ՌՅԼԹ
- Assyrian calendar: 6640
- Baháʼí calendar: 46–47
- Balinese saka calendar: 1811–1812
- Bengali calendar: 1296–1297
- Berber calendar: 2840
- British Regnal year: 53 Vict. 1 – 54 Vict. 1
- Buddhist calendar: 2434
- Burmese calendar: 1252
- Byzantine calendar: 7398–7399
- Chinese calendar: 己丑年 (Earth Ox); 4587 or 4380 — to — 庚寅年 (Metal Tiger); 4588 or 4381
- Coptic calendar: 1606–1607
- Discordian calendar: 3056
- Ethiopian calendar: 1882–1883
- Hebrew calendar: 5650–5651
- Hindu calendars
- Vikram Samvat: 1946–1947
- Shaka Samvat: 1811–1812
- Kali Yuga: 4990–4991
- Holocene calendar: 11890
- Igbo calendar: 890–891
- Iranian calendar: 1268–1269
- Islamic calendar: 1307–1308
- Japanese calendar: Meiji 23 (明治２３年)
- Javanese calendar: 1819–1820
- Julian calendar: Gregorian minus 12 days
- Korean calendar: 4223
- Minguo calendar: 22 before ROC 民前22年
- Nanakshahi calendar: 422
- Thai solar calendar: 2432–2433
- Tibetan calendar: ས་མོ་གླང་ལོ་ (female Earth-Ox); 2016 or 1635 or 863 — to — ལྕགས་ཕོ་སྟག་ལོ་ (male Iron-Tiger); 2017 or 1636 or 864

1890 (MDCCCXC) was a common year starting on Wednesday of the Gregorian calendar and a common year starting on Monday of the Julian calendar, the 1890th year of the Common Era (CE) and Anno Domini (AD) designations, the 890th year of the 2nd millennium, the 90th year of the 19th century, and the 1st year of the 1890s decade. As of the start of 1890, the Gregorian calendar was 12 days ahead of the Julian calendar, which remained in localized use until 1923.

== Events ==
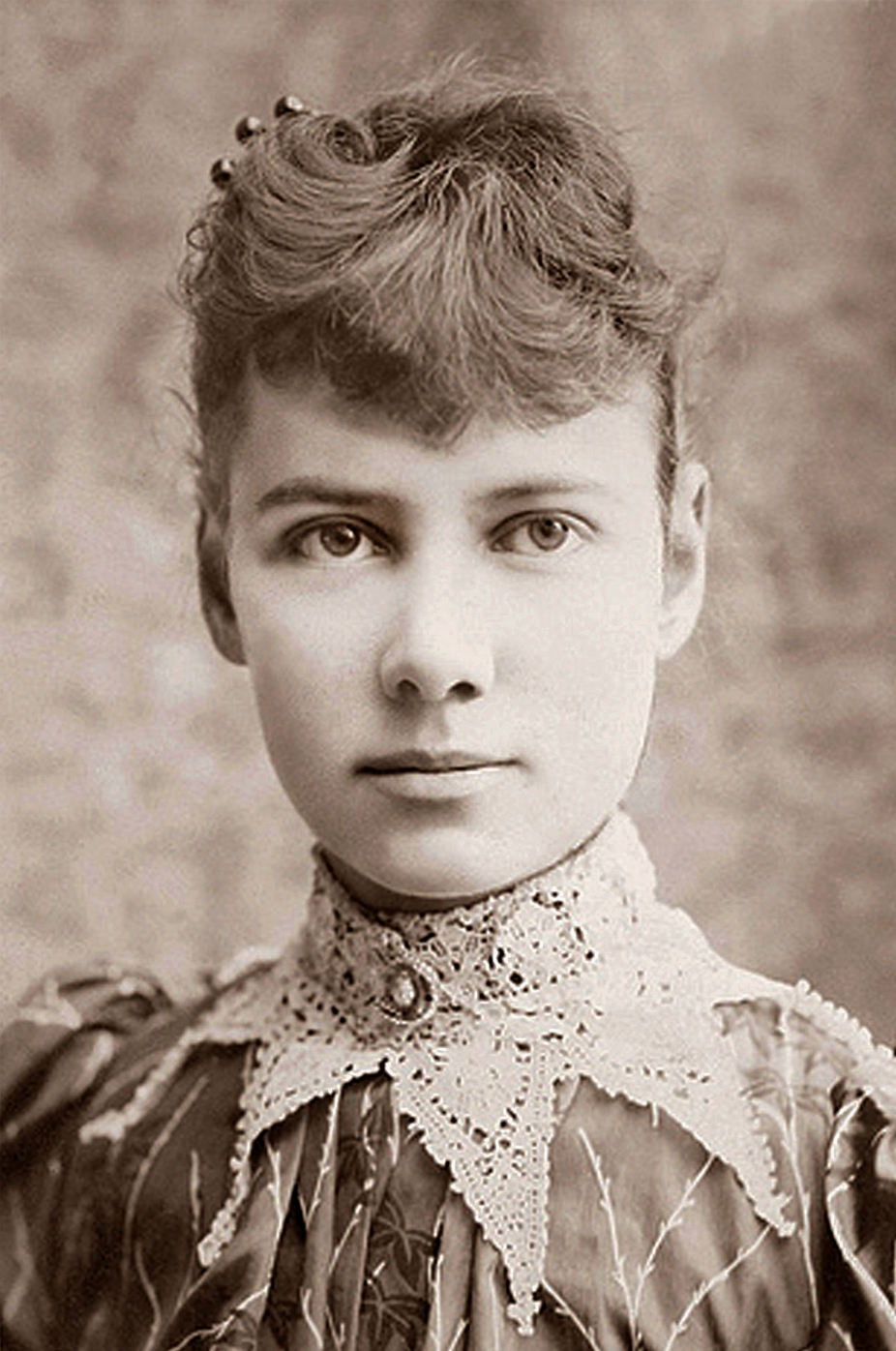
January 25: Nellie Bly, 1890

=== January ===
- January 1 – The Kingdom of Italy establishes Eritrea as its colony in the Horn of Africa.
- January 2 – Alice Sanger becomes the first female staffer in the White House.
- January 11 – 1890 British Ultimatum: The United Kingdom demands Portugal withdraw its forces from the land between the Portuguese colonies of Mozambique and Angola (most of present-day Zimbabwe and Zambia).
- January 15 – Ballet The Sleeping Beauty, with music by Tchaikovsky, is premiered at the Imperial Mariinsky Theatre in St. Petersburg, Russia.
- January 25
  - The United Mine Workers of America is founded.
  - American journalist Nellie Bly completes her round-the-world journey in 72 days.

=== February ===
- February 5 – The worldwide insurance and financial service brand Allianz is founded in Berlin, Germany.
- February 18 – The National American Woman Suffrage Association (NAWSA) is founded by Elizabeth Cady Stanton and Susan B. Anthony.
- February 24 – Chicago is selected to host the World's Columbian Exposition.

=== March ===
- March 3 – The first American football game in Ohio State University history is played in Delaware, Ohio, against Ohio Wesleyan
- March 4 – The Forth Bridge, the longest bridge in Great Britain, on the Firth of Forth in Scotland, is opened to rail traffic.
- March 8 – North Dakota State University is founded in Fargo.
- March 17 – The first railway in Transvaal, the Randtram, opens between Boksburg and Braamfontein in Johannesburg.
- March 20 – Kaiser Wilhelm II forces Otto von Bismarck to resign as Chancellor of Germany.
- March 27
  - March 1890 middle Mississippi Valley tornado outbreak: 24 significant tornadoes are spawned by one system, including one that kills 76 people in Louisville, Kentucky.
  - Preston North End retain the English Football League Championship, winning their final game at Notts County
- March 28 – Washington State University is founded in Pullman.

=== April ===
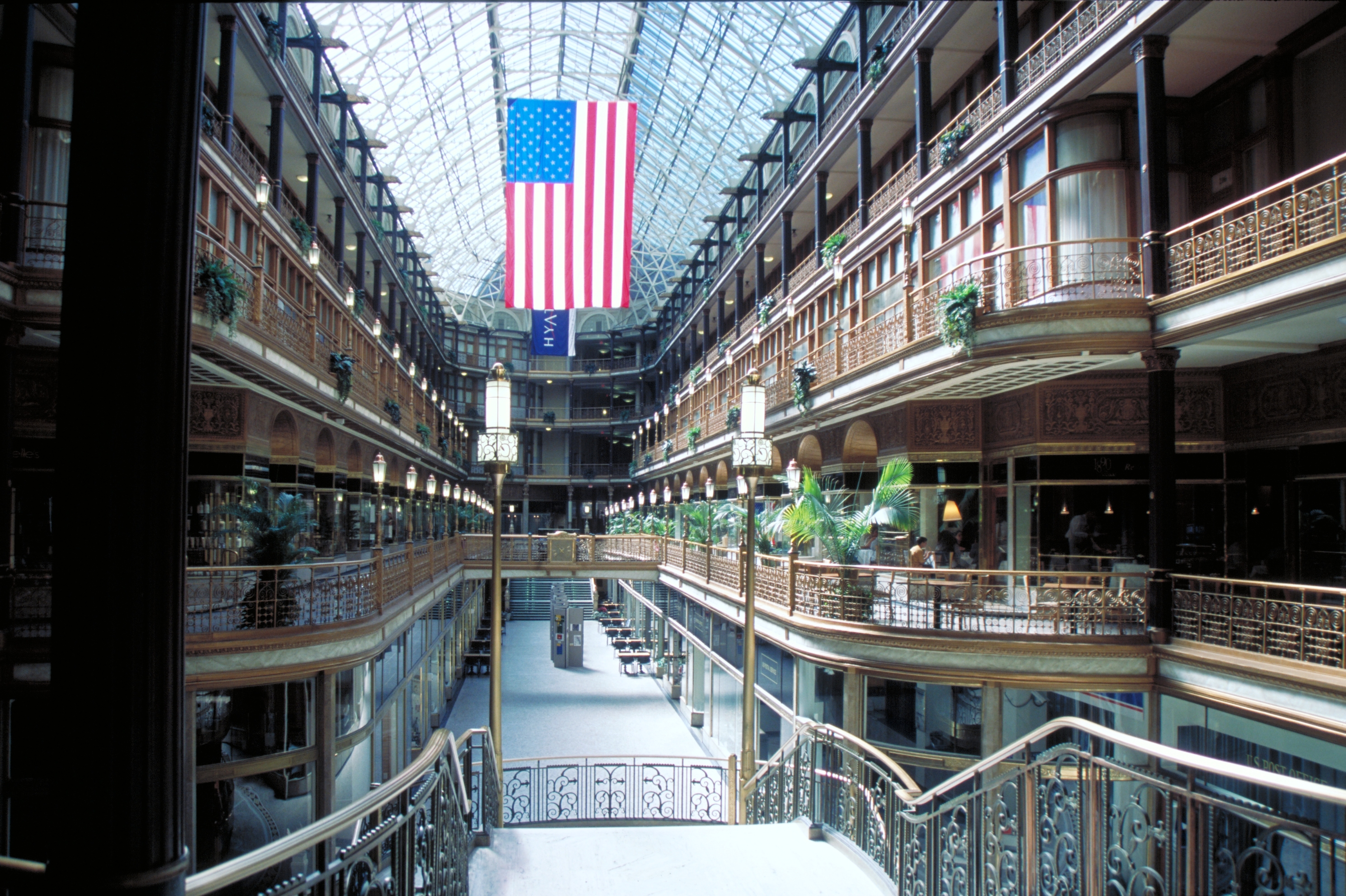
May 30: Cleveland Arcade.

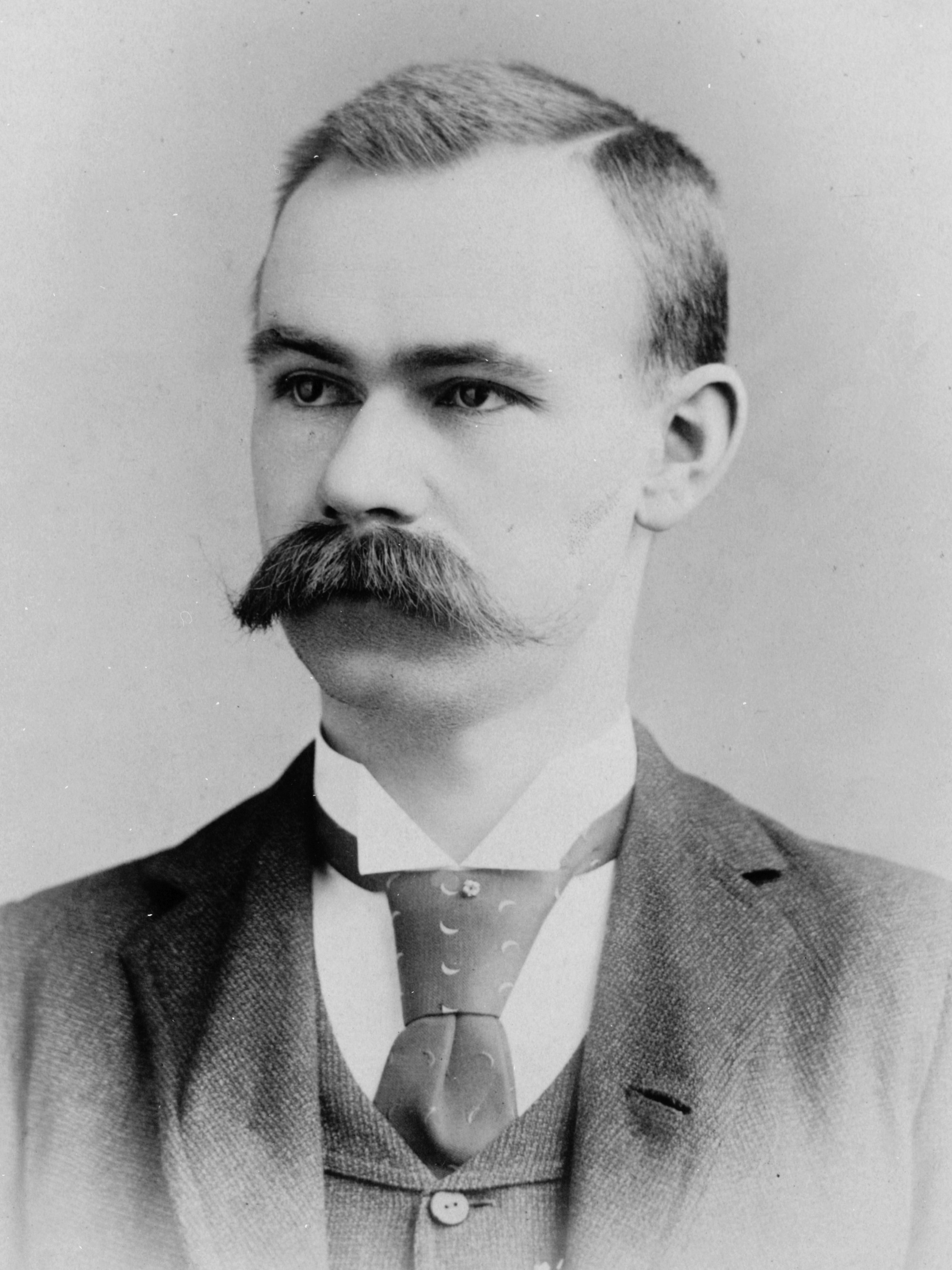
June 1: Herman Hollerith.

- April 2 – Kashihara Shrine, a landmark spot in Nara Prefecture, Japan, is officially built by Emperor Mutsuhito (Emperor of Meiji).
- April 14 – At the First International Conference of American States, in Washington D.C., The Commercial Bureau of the American Republics is founded.

=== May ===
- May 1 – A coordinated series of mass rallies and one-day strikes is held throughout many cities and mining towns in Europe and North America, to demand an eight-hour workday.
- May 2 – President Benjamin Harrison signs the Oklahoma Organic Act, under which Oklahoma Territory is organized, a prerequisite for later statehood.
- May 12 – The first ever official English County Championship cricket match begins in Bristol; Yorkshire beats Gloucestershire, by eight wickets.
- May 20 – Dutch artist Vincent van Gogh moves to Auvers-sur-Oise on the edge of Paris, in the care of Paul Gachet, where he will produce around seventy paintings in as many days.
- May 30 – The five-story skylight Arcade opens in Cleveland, Ohio.
- May 31 – The Ulm Minister opens in Ulm, Germany as the world's tallest cathedral.

=== June ===
- June 1 – The United States Census Bureau begins using Herman Hollerith's tabulating machine to tabulate census returns using punched card input, a landmark in the history of computing hardware. Hollerith's company eventually becomes IBM. The 1890 United States census determines the US population to be 62,979,766, an increase of 25.5 percent relative to the 1880 census.
- June 16 – Royal Dutch Petroleum, predecessor of Royal Dutch Shell, the major worldwide energy production and sales company, is founded in the Netherlands to develop an oilfield in Pangkalan Brandan, North Sumatra.
- June 20 – The Picture of Dorian Gray (by Oscar Wilde) is published by Philadelphia-based Lippincott's Monthly Magazine (dated July).
- June 27 – Canadian-born boxer George Dixon defeats the British bantamweight champion in London, giving him claim to be the first black world champion in any sport.

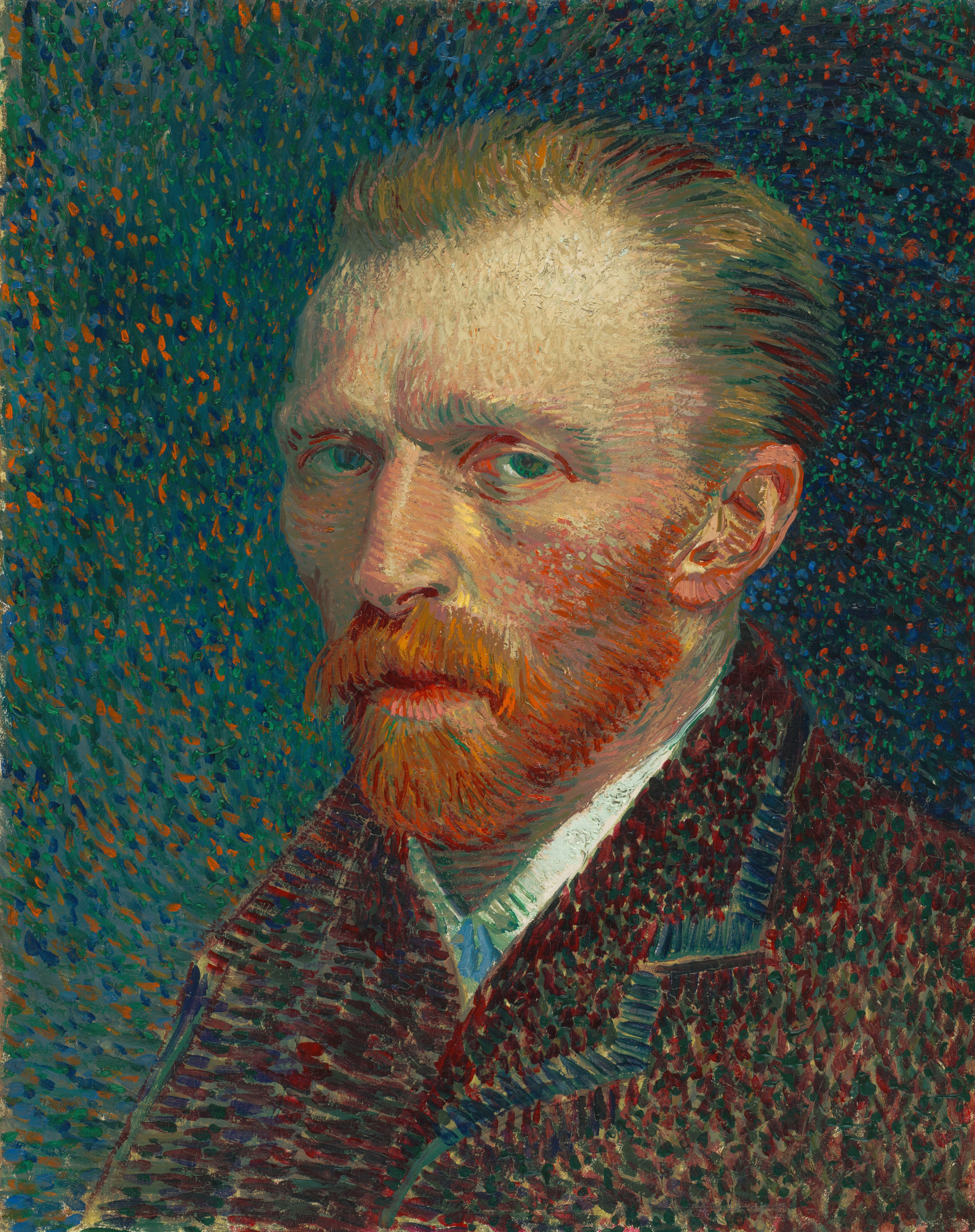
July 29: Vincent van Gogh.

=== July ===
- July 1
  - Heligoland–Zanzibar Treaty: Britain cedes the Heligoland islands (in the German Bight) to Germany, in return for protectorates over Wituland and the Sultanate of Zanzibar (the islands of Pemba and Unguja) in east Africa.
  - 1890 Japanese general election: In the first general election for the House of Representatives of Japan, about 5% of the adult male population elect a lower house of the Diet of Japan, in accordance with the new Meiji Constitution of 1889.
  - The Ouija board is first released by Elijah Bond.
- July 2 – The Sherman Antitrust Act and Sherman Silver Purchase Act become United States law.
- July 3 – Idaho is admitted as the 43rd U.S. state.
- July 10 – Wyoming is admitted as the 44th U.S. state.
- July 13 – In Minnesota, storms result in the Sea Wing disaster on Lake Pepin, killing 98.
- July 26 – In Buenos Aires, the Revolution of the Park takes place, forcing President Juárez Celman's resignation.
- July 27 – Death of Vincent van Gogh: van Gogh shoots himself, dying two days later.

=== August ===
- August 6 – At Auburn Prison in New York, William Kemmler becomes the first person to be executed in the electric chair.
- August 20 – Treaty of London: Portugal and the United Kingdom define the borders of the Portuguese colonies of Mozambique and Angola.
- August 23 – The BOVESPA stock exchange is founded in São Paulo, Brazil.
- August 28 – The strongest storm in Finnish history kills at least three people.
- August – Kaiser Wilhelm II and Tsar Alexander III meet at Narva.

=== September ===
- September 6 – Dublin association football club Bohemian F.C. is founded in the Gate Lodge, Phoenix Park.
- September 12 – Salisbury, Rhodesia, is founded.
- September 19 – The University of North Texas is founded, as the Texas Normal College and Teacher Training Institute.
- September 25 — President Wilford Woodruff of the Church of Jesus Christ of Latter-day Saints issues the 1890 Manifesto ending the official practice of polygamy.

=== October ===
- October 1 – Yosemite National Park is established in California.
- October 9 – The first brief flight of Clément Ader's steam-powered fixed-wing aircraft Ader Éole takes place in Satory, France. It flies uncontrolled approximately 50 m (160 ft) at a height of 20 cm (7.9 in), the first take-off of a powered airplane solely under its own power.
- October 11 – In Washington, D.C., the Daughters of the American Revolution is founded.
- October 12 – The Uddevalla Suffrage Association is founded in Sweden, with a formal founding event on November 2 a month later.
- October 13 – The Delta Chi fraternity is founded by 11 law students at Cornell University in Ithaca, New York.

=== November ===
- November 4 – The first deep level London Underground (Tube) Railway, the City and South London Railway, opens officially.
- November 21 – Edward King, Anglican bishop of Lincoln, is convicted of using ritualistic practices.
- November 23 – King William III of the Netherlands dies without a male heir, and his daughter Princess Wilhelmina becomes Queen, causing the end of the personal union of thrones with Luxembourg (which requires a male heir) so that Adolphe, Duke of Nassau becomes Grand Duke of Luxembourg.
- November 29
  - The Meiji Constitution goes into effect in Japan, and its first Diet convenes.
  - At West Point, New York, the United States Navy defeats the United States Army 24–0 in the first Army–Navy Game of college football.
- November – Scotland Yard, headquarters of the Metropolitan Police Service, moves to a building on London's Victoria Embankment, as New Scotland Yard.

=== December ===
- December 10 – The New York World Building is completed in New York City, the tallest building in the United States for 10 years at a height of 110 meters.
- December 15 – Hunkpapa Lakota leader Sitting Bull is killed by police on Standing Rock Indian Reservation.
- December 24 – The Oklahoma territorial legislature establishes three institutions of higher learning University of Oklahoma, Oklahoma State University, and University of Central Oklahoma.
- December 29 – Wounded Knee Massacre: At Wounded Knee, South Dakota, a Lakota camp, the U.S. 7th Cavalry Regiment tries to disperse the non-violent "Ghost-Dance" which was promised to usher in a new era of power and freedom to Native Americans but is feared as a potential rallying tool for violent rebellion by some in the U.S. government. Shooting begins, and 153 Lakota Sioux and 25 troops are killed; about 150 flee the scene. This is the last tribe to be defeated and confined to a reservation as well as the beginning of the decline of both the American Indian Wars and the American frontier.

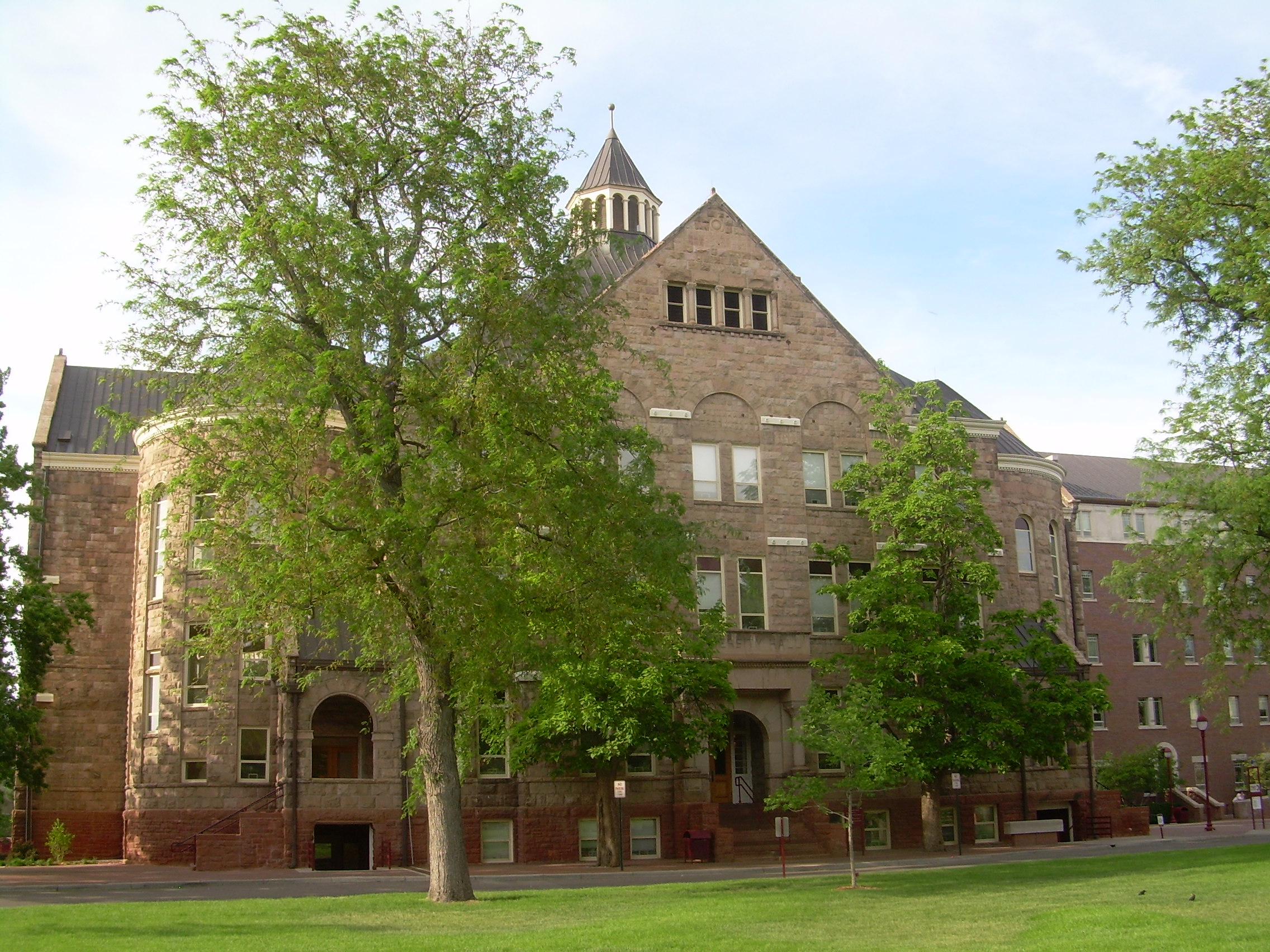
University of Denver University Hall, built in 1890

=== Date unknown ===
- The folding carton box is invented by Robert Gair, a Brooklyn printer who developed production of paper-board boxes in 1879.
- The United States city of Boise, Idaho, drills the first geothermal well.
- Brown trout are introduced into the upper Firehole River, in Yellowstone National Park.
- High School Cadets is written by John Philip Sousa.
- Wilhelm II, German Emperor opposes Bismarck's attempt to renew the law outlawing the Social Democratic Party.
- Blackwall Buildings, Whitechapel, noted philanthropic housing, is built in the East End of London.
- English archaeologist Flinders Petrie excavates at Tell el-Hesi, Palestine (mistakenly identified as Tel Lachish), the first scientific excavation of an archaeological site in the Holy Land, during which he discovers how tells are formed.
- American geostrategist Alfred Thayer Mahan publishes his influential book The Influence of Sea Power upon History, 1660–1783.
- Francis Galton announces a statistical demonstration of the uniqueness and classifiability of individual human fingerprints.
- Japanese tractor and iron pipe brand, Kubota founded in Osaka, Japan.
- Emerson Electric, an American electronics industry giant, is founded in Missouri.

== Births ==
=== January ===
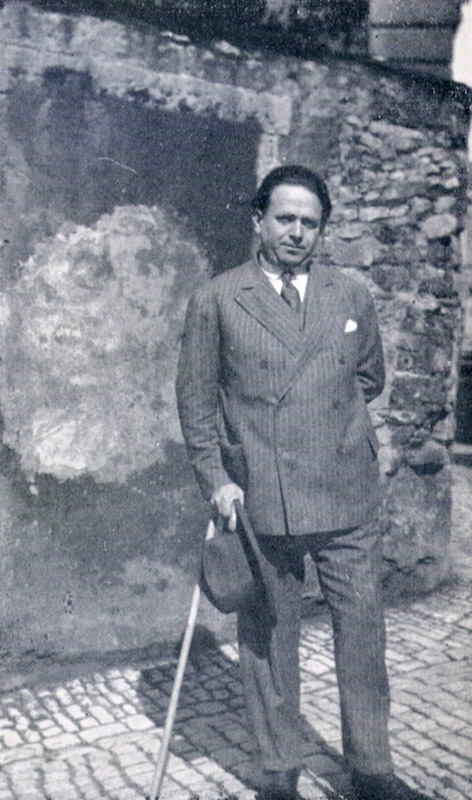
Kurt Tucholsky

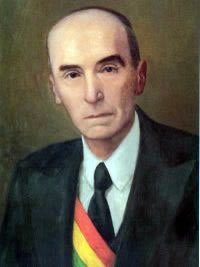
Néstor Guillén

- January 1 – Anton Melik, Slovenian geographer (d. 1966)
- January 3 - Eddie Gribbon, American comedy actor (d. 1965)
- January 4
  - Augustus Agar, British commodore, Victoria Cross recipient (d. 1968)
  - Victor Lustig, Bohemian-born con artist (d. 1947)
- January 5 – Sarah Aaronsohn, member of the Jewish spy ring Nili (d. 1917)
- January 8 – Taixu, Chinese Buddhist activist (d. 1947)
- January 9
  - Kurt Tucholsky, German-born journalist and satirist (d. 1935)
  - Karel Čapek, Czech writer (d. 1938)
- January 11 – Oswald de Andrade, Brazilian Modernist writer (d.1954)
- January 13 – Jüri Uluots, 8th Prime Minister of Estonia (d. 1945)
- January 19 – Élise Rivet, French Roman Catholic nun and war heroine (d. 1945)
- January 20 – Boris Kozo-Polyansky, Russian botanist and evolutionary biologist (d. 1957)
- January 22 – Fred M. Vinson, Chief Justice of the United States (d. 1953)
- January 28
  - Néstor Guillén, Bolivian politician, 40th President of Bolivia (d. 1966)
  - Robert Stroud, Birdman of Alcatraz (d. 1963)

=== February ===
- February 10 – Boris Pasternak, Russian writer (Doctor Zhivago), Nobel Prize laureate (declined) (d. 1960)
- February 14 – Nina Hamnett, Welsh painter (d. 1956)
- February 15 – Matome Ugaki, Japanese admiral (d. 1945)
- February 16 – Francesco de Pinedo, Italian aviator (d. 1933)
- February 17 – Ronald Fisher, English statistician and geneticist (d. 1962)
- February 18
  - Edward Arnold, American actor (d. 1956)
  - Adolphe Menjou, American actor (d. 1963)
- February 24 – Marjorie Main, American actress (d. 1975)
- February 25
  - Dame Myra Hess, English pianist (d. 1965)
  - Kiyohide Shima, Japanese admiral (d. 1973)
- February 27
  - Freddie Keppard, American jazz musician (d. 1933)
  - Art Smith, American pilot (d. 1926)

=== March ===
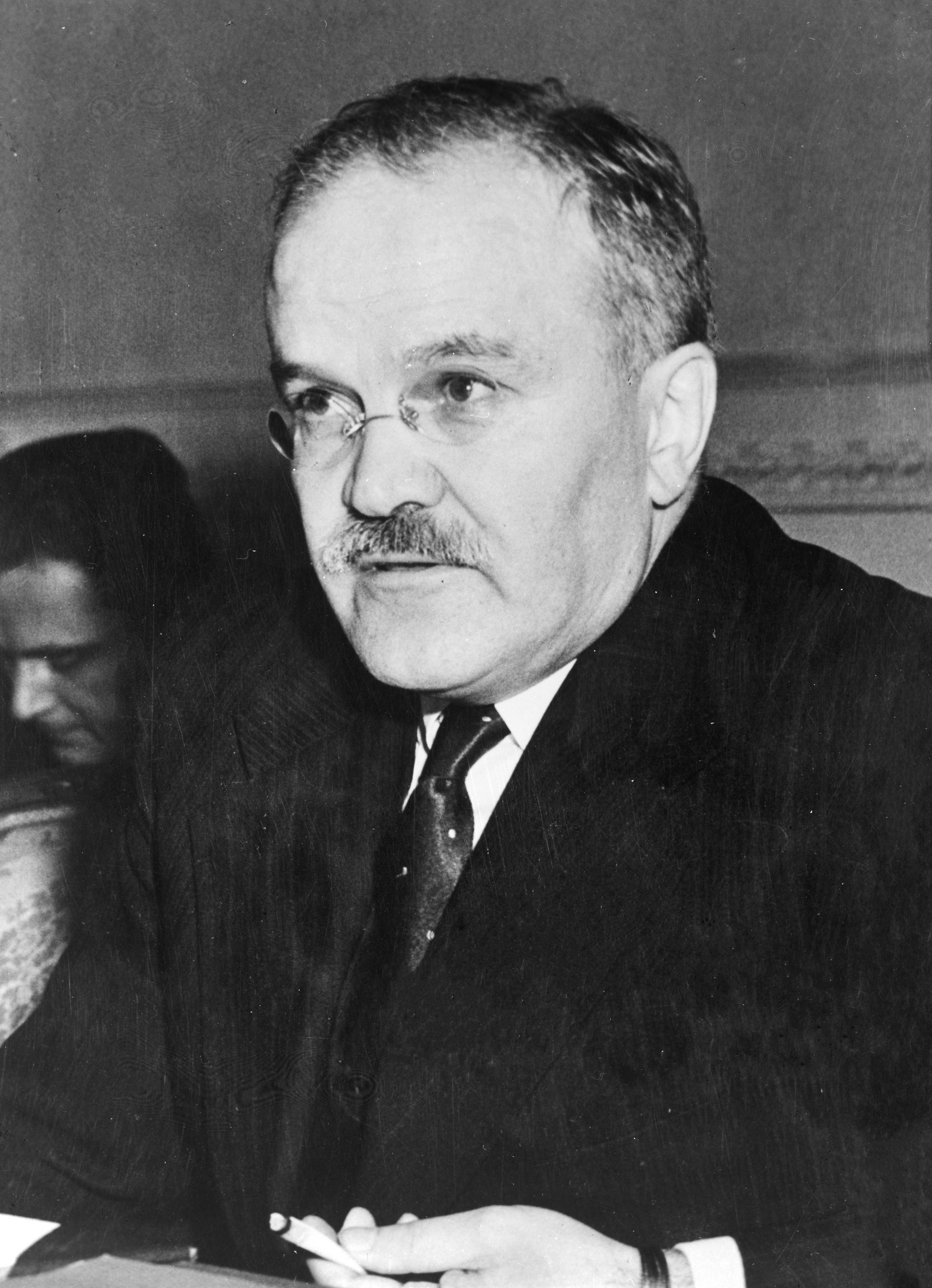
Vyacheslav Molotov

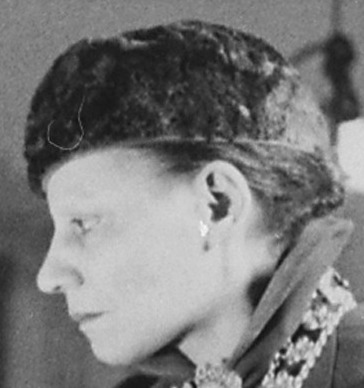
Nancy Elizabeth Prophet

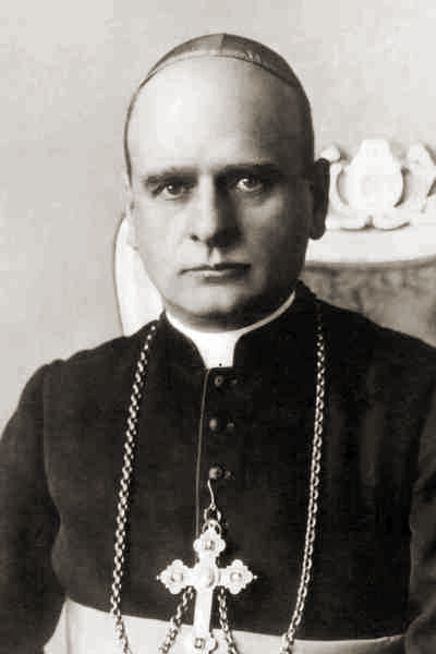
Eugeniusz Baziak

- March 1 – Theresa Bernstein, Polish-born American artist and writer (d. 2002)
- March 4 – Norman Bethune, Canadian doctor and humanitarian (d. 1939)
- March 8 – Eugeniusz Baziak, Polish Roman Catholic archbishop (d. 1962)
- March 9 (new style) – Vyacheslav Molotov, Soviet politician (d. 1986)
- March 11 – Vannevar Bush, American engineer, inventor and politician (d. 1960)
- March 19 – Nancy Elizabeth Prophet, African-American artist known for her sculpture (d. 1960)
- March 20
  - Beniamino Gigli, Italian tenor (d. 1957)
  - Lauritz Melchior, Danish-American tenor (d. 1973)
- March 26 – Aaron S. Merrill, American admiral (d. 1961)
- March 28 – Paul Whiteman, American bandleader (d. 1967)
- March 31 – Lawrence Bragg, English physicist, Nobel Prize laureate (d. 1971)

=== April ===
- April 6 – Anthony Fokker, Dutch aircraft manufacturer (d. 1939)
- April 7 – Marjory Stoneman Douglas, American conservationist and writer (d. 1998)
- April 13
  - Frank Murphy, American politician and Associate Justice of the Supreme Court of the United States (d. 1949)
  - Dadasaheb Torne, Indian filmmaker (d. 1960)
- April 16
  - Fred Root, English cricketer (d. 1954)
  - Vernon Sturdee, Australian general (d. 1966)
- April 17 – Victor Chapman, French-American fighter pilot (d. 1916)
- April 18 – Grand Duchess Maria Pavlovna of Russia (d.1958)
- April 20
  - Maurice Duplessis, premier of Quebec (d. 1959)
  - Adolf Schärf, President of Austria (d. 1965)
- April 21 – Michitaro Tozuka, Japanese admiral (d. 1966)
- April 26 – Edgar Kennedy, American comedic actor (d. 1948)
- April 30 – Géza Lakatos, 36th Prime Minister of Hungary (d. 1967)

=== May ===
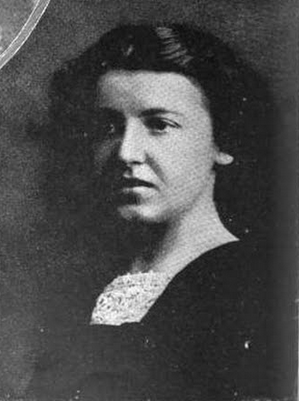
Clelia Lollini

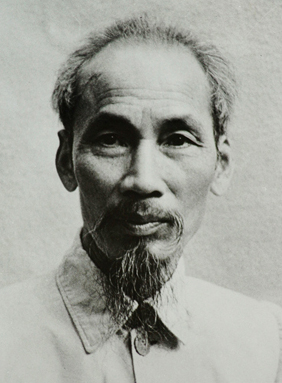
Ho Chi Minh

- May 1 – Clelia Lollini, Italian physician (d. 1963)
- May 4 – Franklin Carmichael, Canadian landscape painter and graphic designer (d. 1945)
- May 10 – Alfred Jodl, German general (d. 1946)
- May 15 – Katherine Anne Porter, American author (d. 1980)
- May 19 – Ho Chi Minh, Prime minister/President of North Vietnam (d. 1969)
- May 23 – Herbert Marshall, English actor (d. 1966)

=== June ===
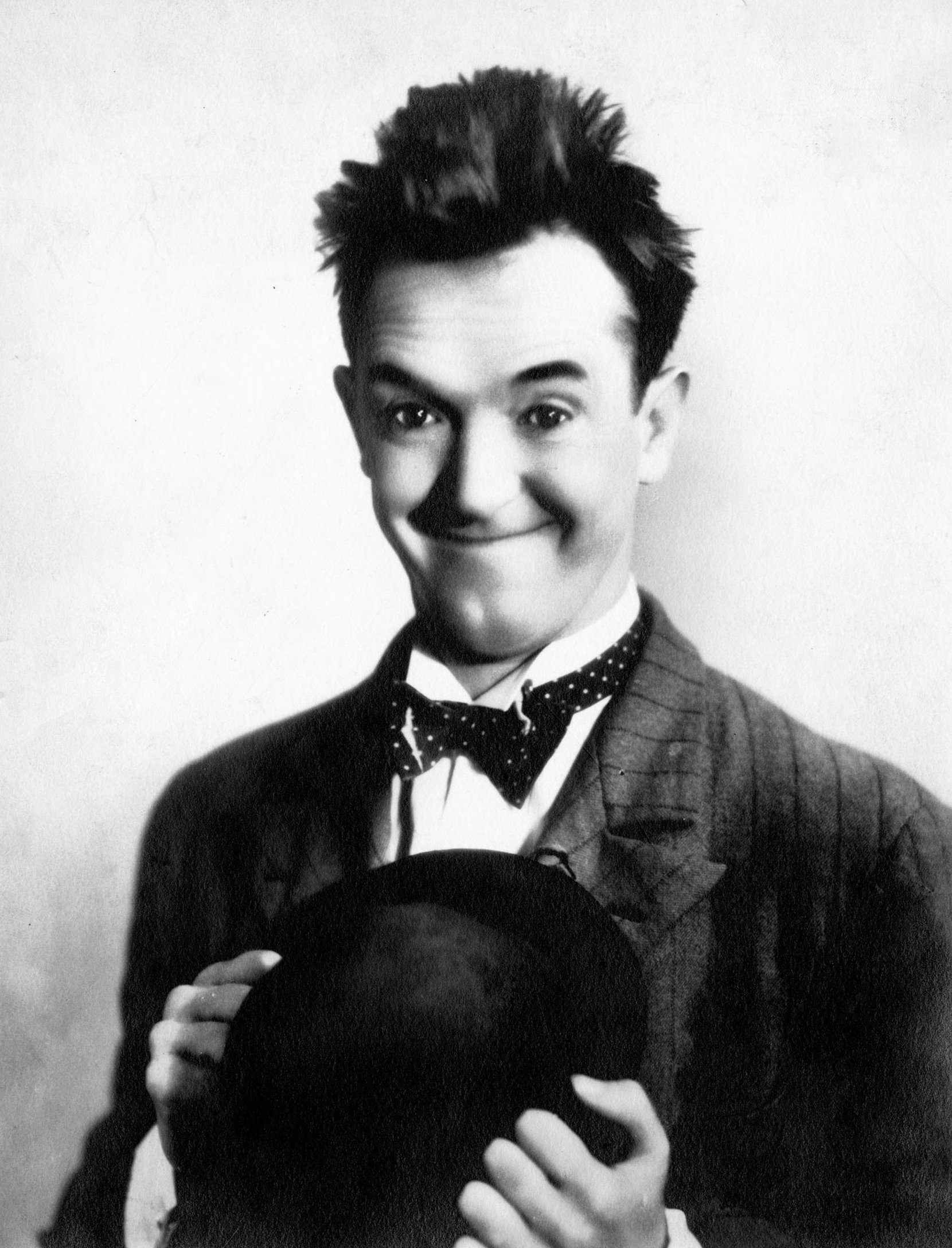
Stan Laurel

- June 1 – Frank Morgan, American actor (d. 1949)
- June 6
  - Ted Lewis, American jazz musician and entertainer (d. 1971)
  - Naomasa Sakonju, Japanese admiral and war criminal (d. 1948)
- June 10 – William A. Seiter, American film director (d. 1964)
- June 11 – Béla Miklós, 38th Prime Minister of Hungary (d. 1948)
- June 16 – Stan Laurel, English-born actor (d. 1965)
- June 17 – Hatazō Adachi, Japanese general (d. 1947)
- June 21 – Lewis H. Brereton, American aviation pioneer and air force general (d. 1967)
- June 25 – Charlotte Greenwood, American actress (d. 1977)
- June 26 – Jeanne Eagels, American actress (d. 1929)
- June 29
  - Hendrikje van Andel-Schipper, Dutch supercentenarian (d. 2005)
  - Pietro Montana, Italian-American sculptor, painter and teacher (d. 1978)
- June 30 – Paul Boffa, 5th Prime Minister of Malta (d. 1962)

=== July ===
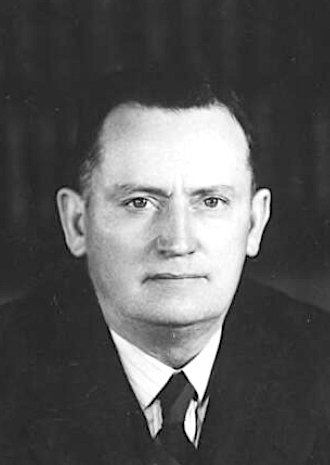
Frank Forde

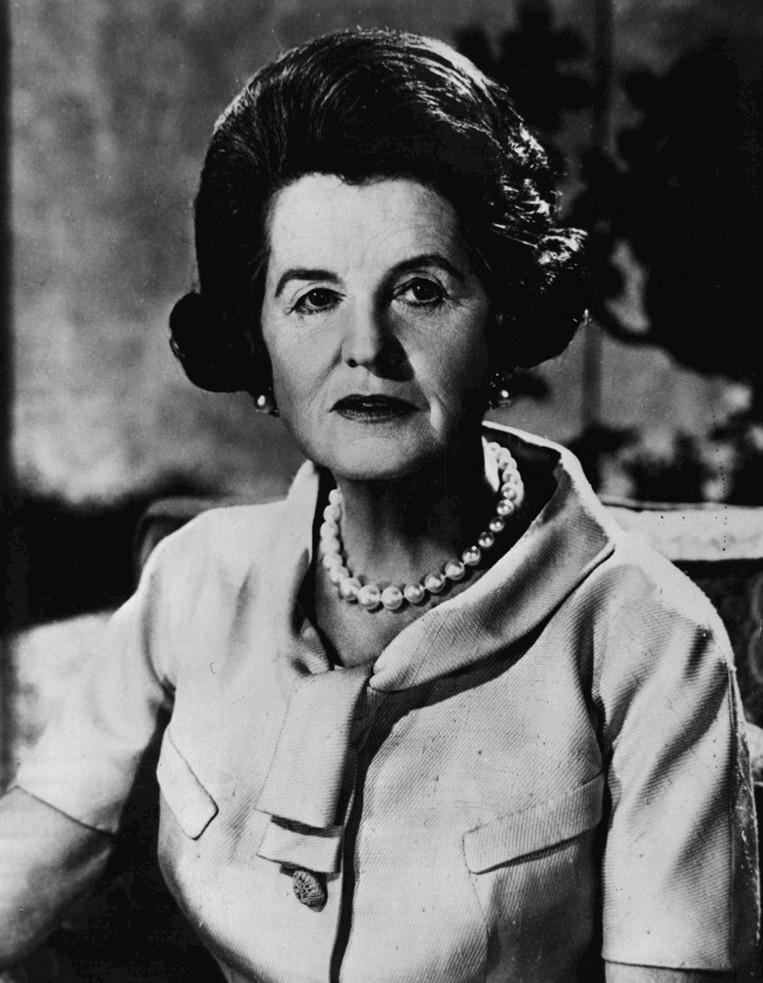
Rose Kennedy

- July 6 – Yvonne Odic, French mechanical engineer (d. 1983)
- July 11 – Arthur Tedder, 1st Baron Tedder, British air force air marshal (d. 1967)
- July 18 – Frank Forde, 15th Prime Minister of Australia (d. 1983)
- July 19 – George II of Greece, King of Greece (d. 1947)
- July 20 – Verna Felton, American character actress (d. 1966)
- July 22 – Rose Kennedy, American philanthropist and matriarch of the Kennedy family (d. 1995)
- July 26
  - Daniel J. Callaghan, American admiral and Medal of Honor recipient (d. 1942)
  - Seiichi Itō, Japanese admiral (d. 1945)
- July 29 – P. S. Subrahmanya Sastri, Indian Sanskrit scholar (d. 1978)

=== August ===
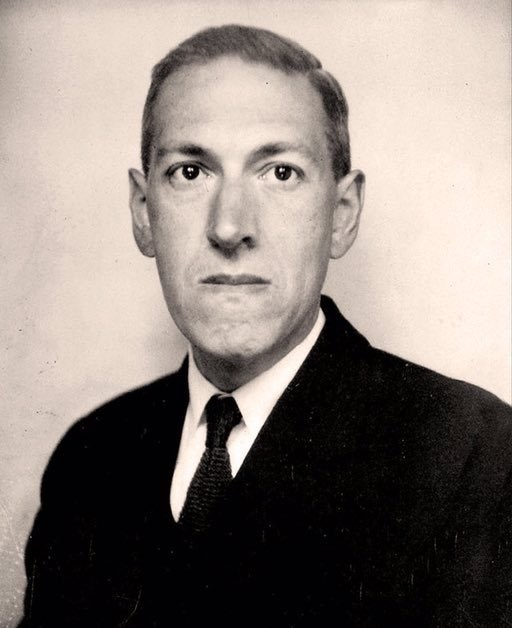
H. P. Lovecraft

- August 2 – Marin Sais, American film actress (d. 1971)
- August 3 – Konstantin Melnikov, Russian avant-garde architect (d. 1974)
- August 5 – Erich Kleiber, Austrian conductor (d. 1956)
- August 10
  - Angus Lewis Macdonald, Nova Scotia Premier (d. 1954)
  - Bechara El Khoury, 2-Time Prime Minister and 2-Time President of Lebanon (d. 1964)
- August 15
  - Jacques Ibert, French composer (d. 1962)
  - Elizabeth Bolden, American supercentenarian, last surviving person born in 1890 (d. 2006)
- August 18 – Walther Funk, German politician (d. 1960)
- August 20 – H. P. Lovecraft, American writer (d. 1937)
- August 22
  - Hans-Joachim Buddecke, German World War I fighter pilot and ace (d. 1918)
  - Cecil Kellaway, South African character actor (d. 1973)
- August 24 – Duke Kahanamoku, American swimmer (d. 1968)

=== September ===
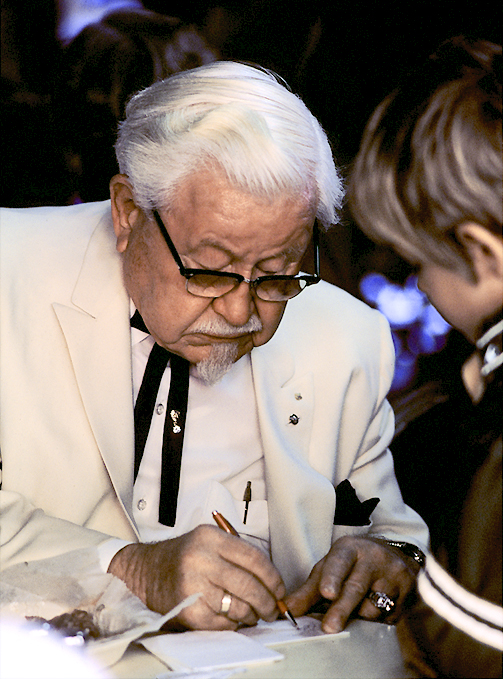
Colonel Sanders

- September 8 – Dorothy Price, Irish physician (d. 1954)
- September 9 – Colonel Sanders, American founder of KFC (d. 1980)
- September 10
  - Elsa Schiaparelli, French couturiere (d. 1973)
  - Sir Mortimer Wheeler, British archaeologist (d. 1976)
- September 15
  - Agatha Christie, English writer (d. 1976)
  - Frank Martin, Swiss composer (d. 1974)
- September 20
  - Jelly Roll Morton, American jazz pianist, composer and bandleader (d. 1941)
  - Rachel Bluwstein, Israeli poet (d. 1931)
- September 21 – Max Immelmann, German World War I fighter ace (d. 1916)
- September 23
  - Kakuji Kakuta, Japanese admiral (d. 1944)
  - Friedrich Paulus, German field marshal (d. 1957)
- September 24 – A. P. Herbert, English humorist, novelist, playwright and law reform activist (d. 1971)

=== October ===
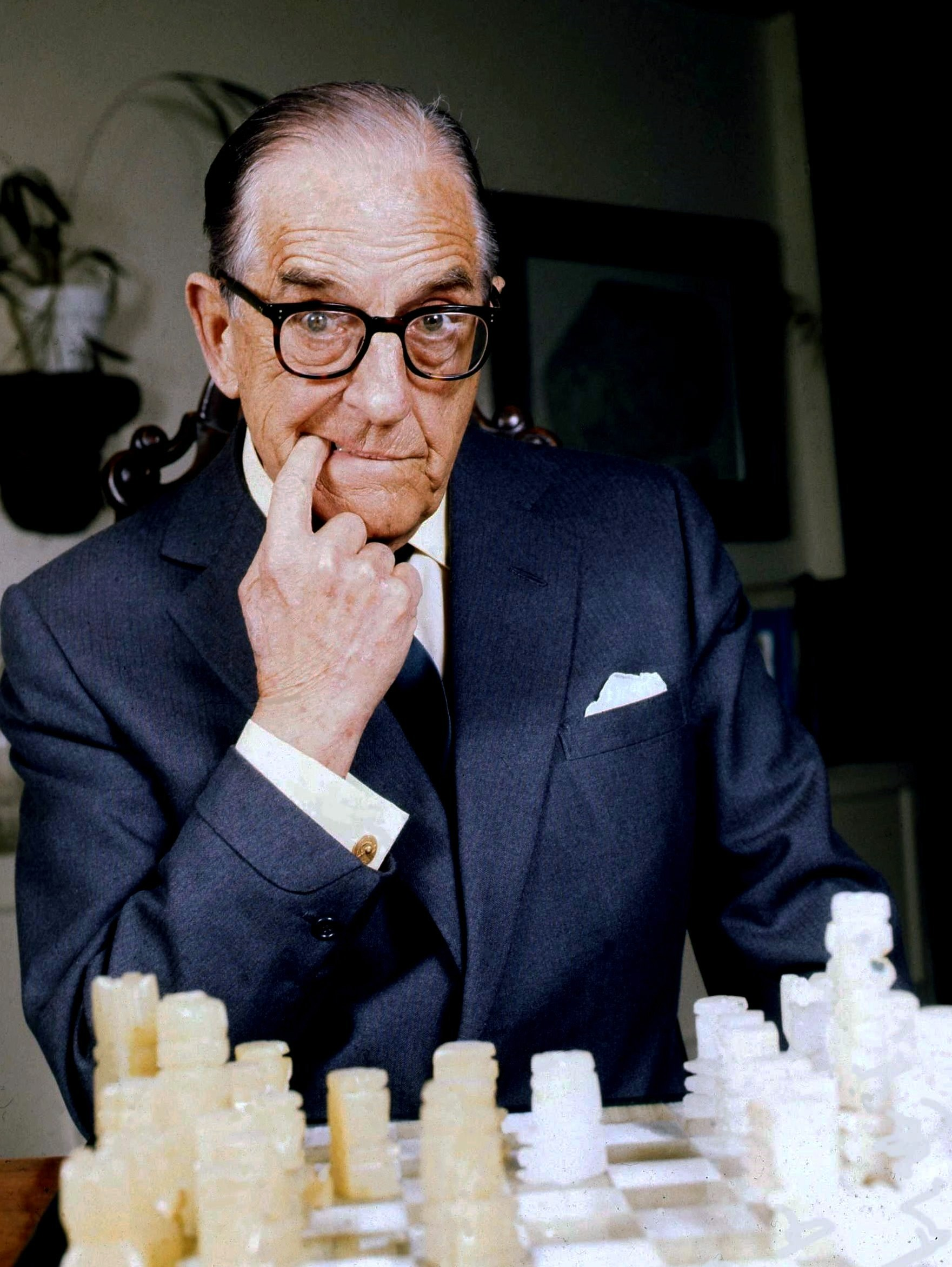
Stanley Holloway

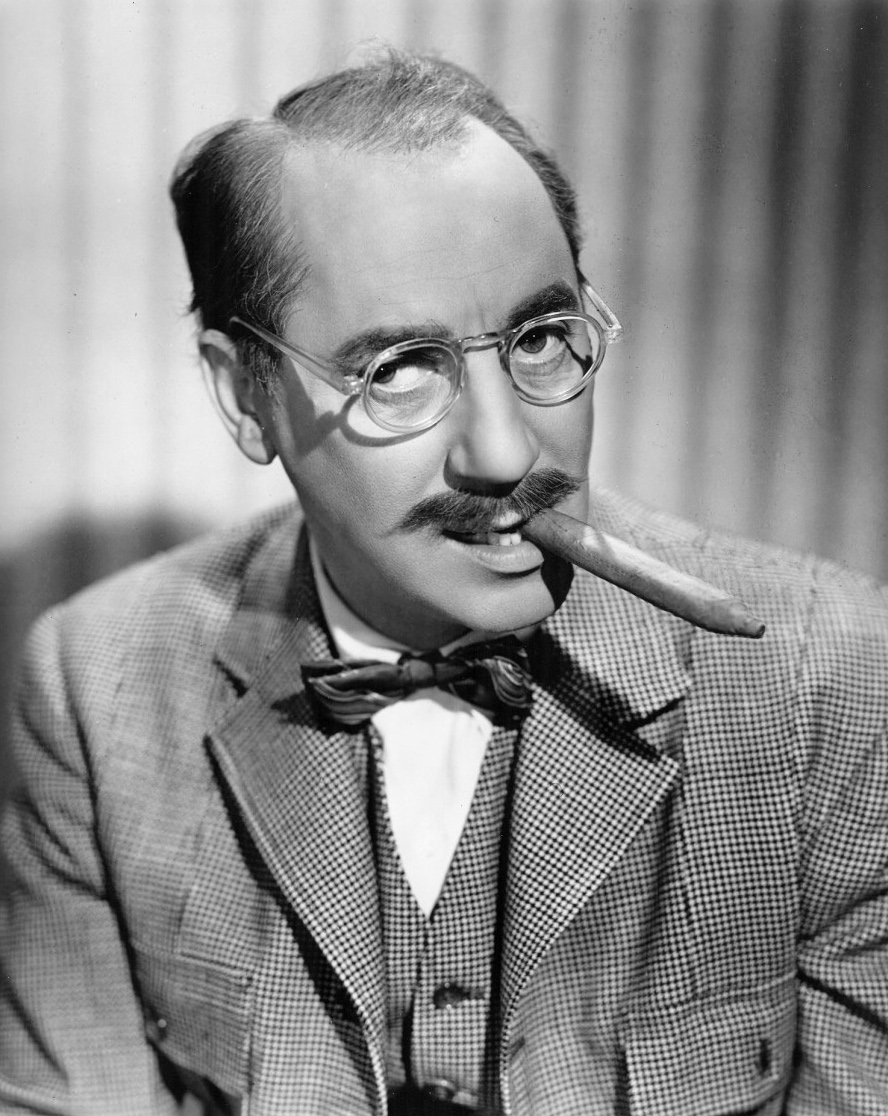
Groucho Marx

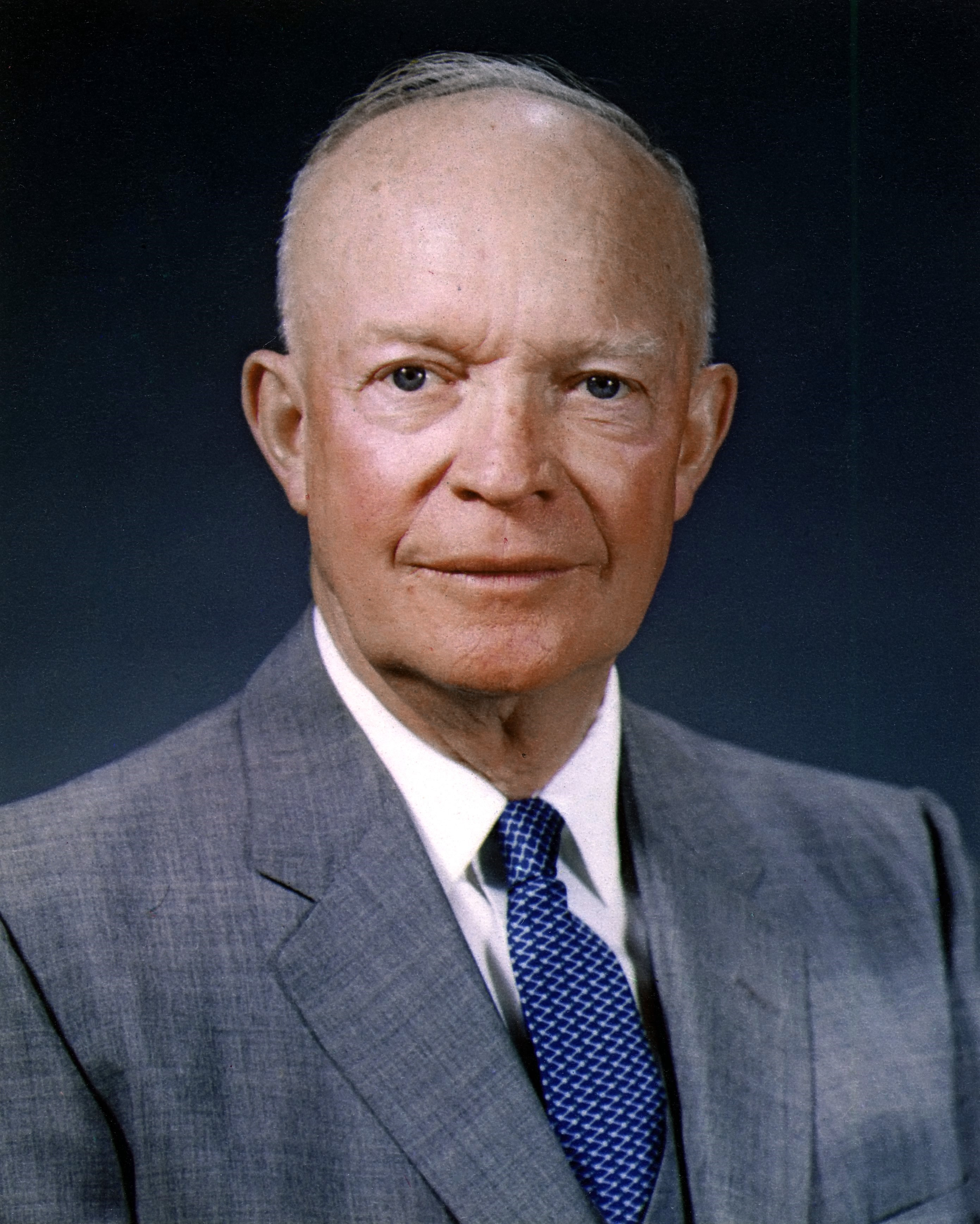
Dwight D. Eisenhower

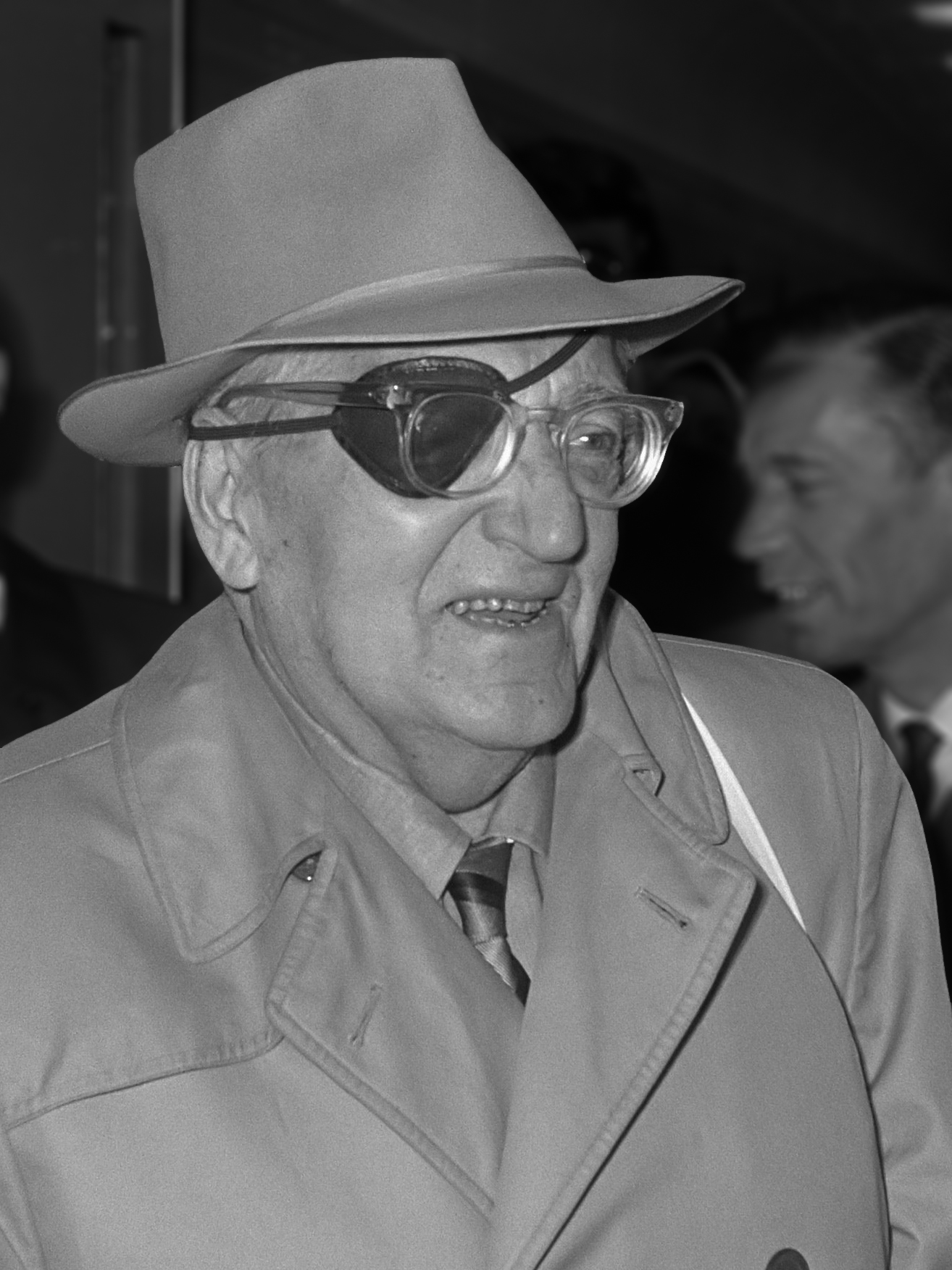
Fritz Lang

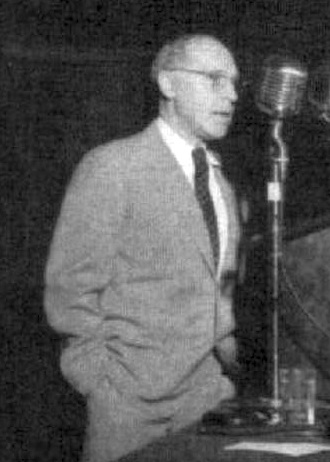
Hermann Joseph Muller

- October 1
  - Stanley Holloway, English actor (d. 1982)
  - Alice Joyce, American silent film actress (d. 1955)
  - Blanche Oelrichs, American poet, second wife of John Barrymore (d. 1950)
- October 2 – Groucho Marx, American comedian (d. 1977)
- October 3 – Emilio Portes Gil, Mexican teacher, journalist, lawyer and substitute President of Mexico, 1928–1930 (d. 1978)
- October 8
  - Henrich Focke, German aviation pioneer (d. 1979)
  - Eddie Rickenbacker, American race car driver and World War I fighter pilot (d. 1973)
- October 9 – Aimee Semple McPherson, Canadian-American Pentecostal Evangelist (d. 1944)
- October 13 – Conrad Richter, American novelist and short story writer (d. 1968)
- October 14 – Dwight D. Eisenhower, US general and 34th President of the United States (d. 1969)
- October 16
  - Michael Collins, Irish patriot (d. 1922)
  - Paul Strand, American photographer (d. 1976)
- October 17 – Roy Kilner, English cricketer (d. 1928)
- October 20 – Sherman Minton, American politician and Associate Justice of the Supreme Court of the United States (d. 1965)
- October 23 – Abdul Hamid Karami, 16th Prime Minister of Lebanon (d. 1950)
- October 25 – Floyd Bennett, American aviator and explorer (d. 1928)
- October 29 – Hans-Valentin Hube, German army general (d. 1944)

=== November ===
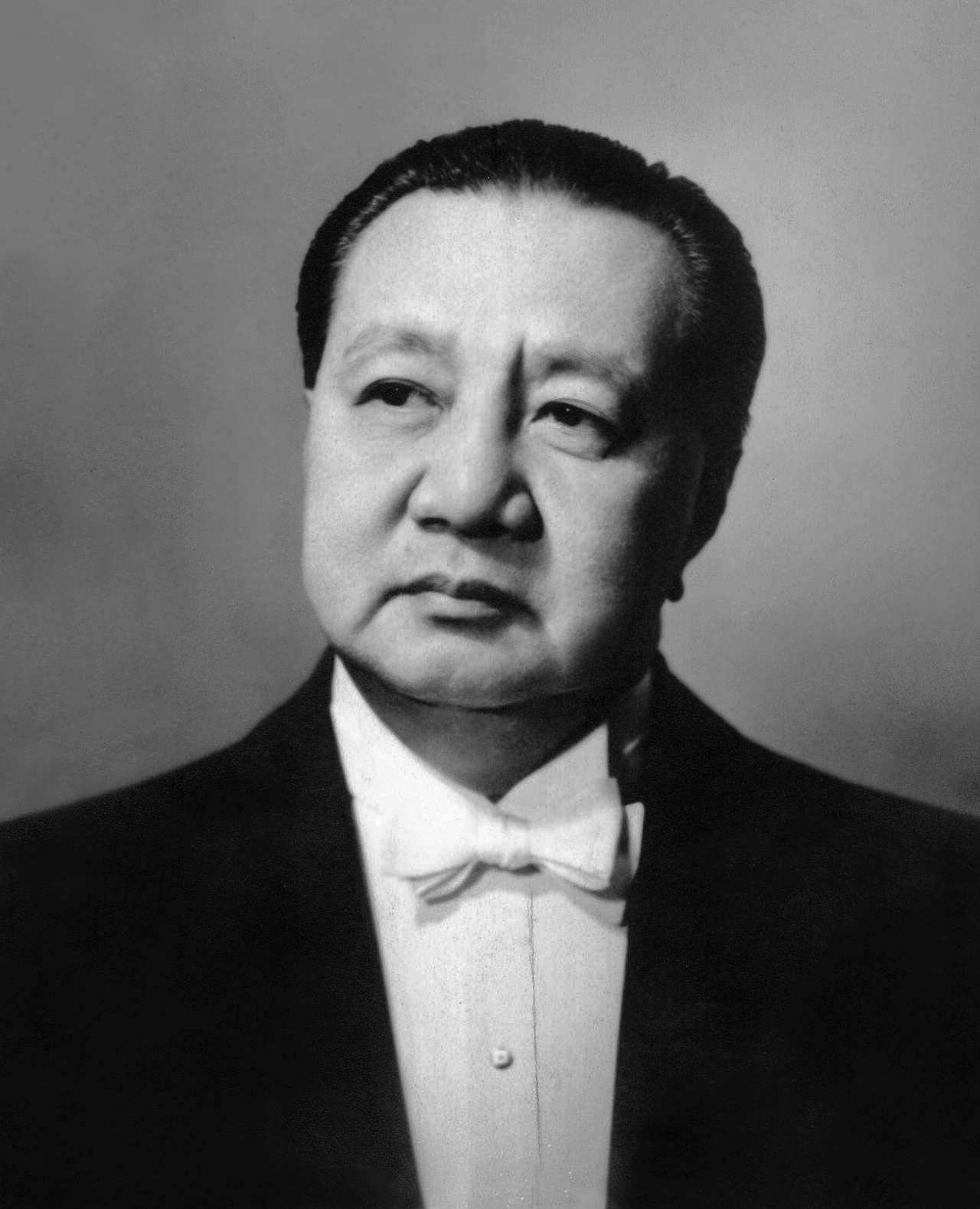
Elpidio Quirino

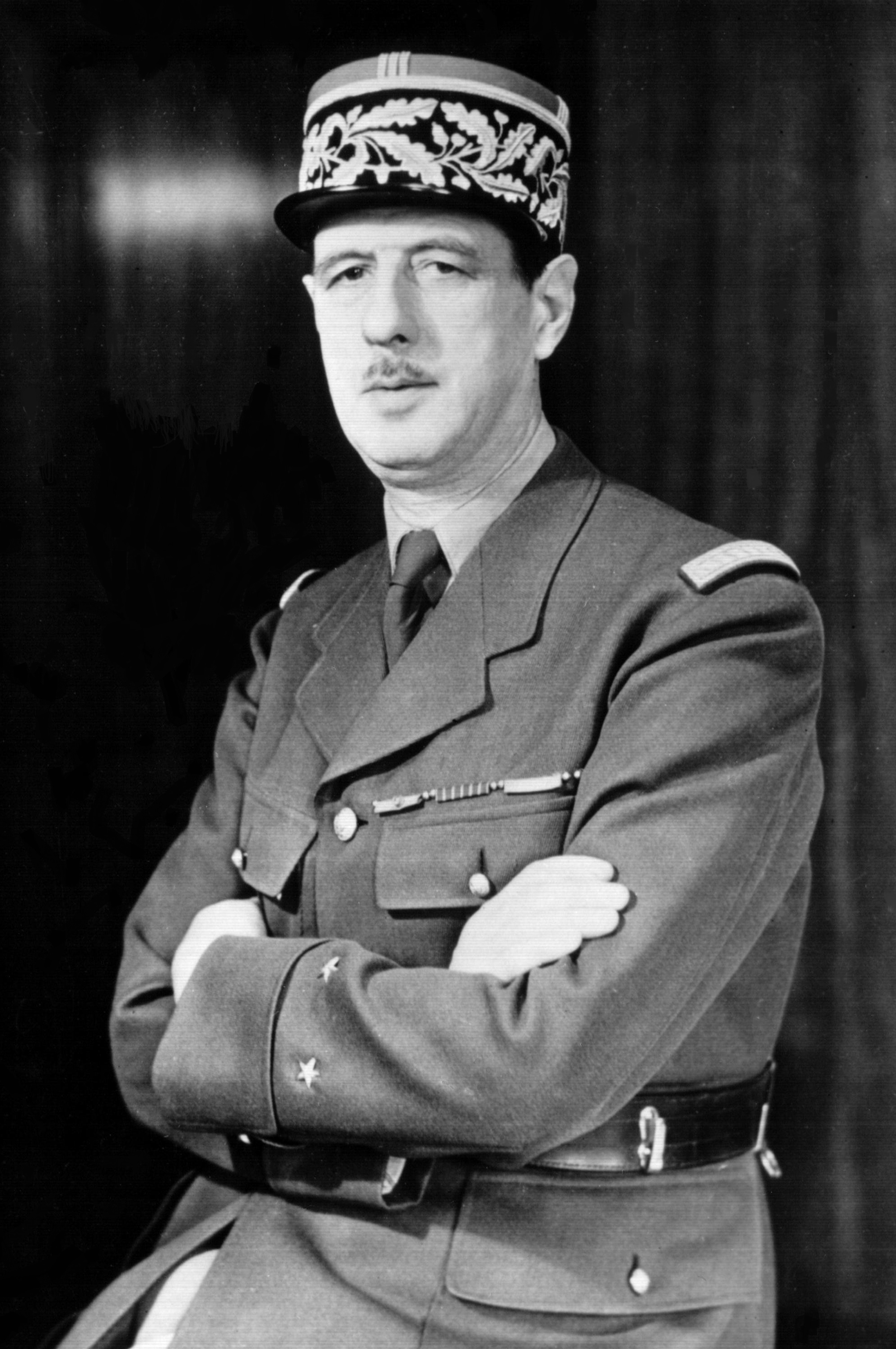
Charles de Gaulle

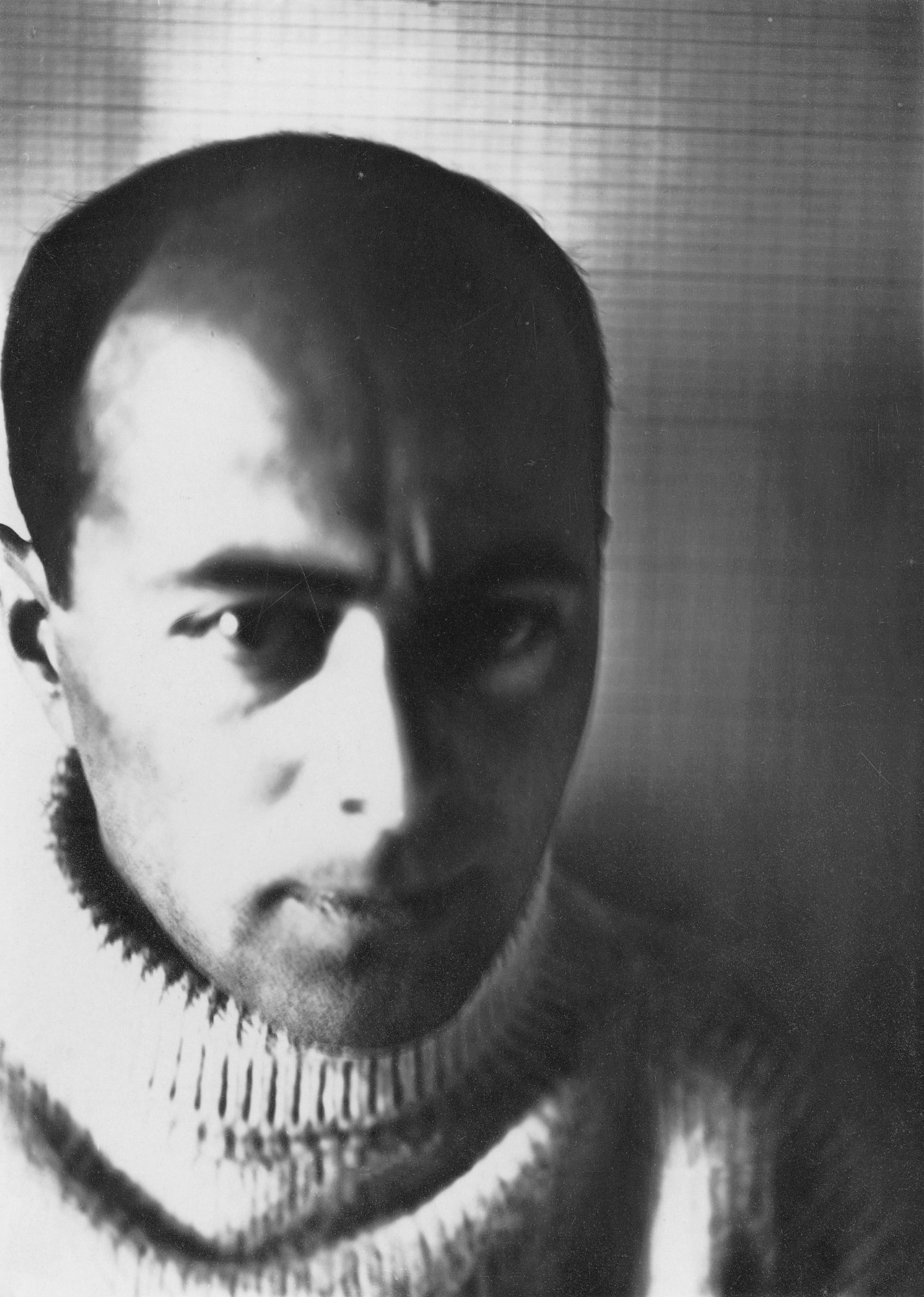
El Lissitzky

- November 4 – Saadi Al Munla, 17th Prime Minister of Lebanon (d. 1975)
- November 7
  - Tomitarō Horii, Japanese general (d. 1942)
  - Jan Matulka, American painter (d. 1972)
- November 9 – Grigory Kulik, Soviet military officer, Marshal of the Soviet Union (d. 1950)
- November 16
  - George Seldes, American investigative journalist (d. 1995)
  - Elpidio Quirino, 6th President of the Philippines (d. 1956)
- November 18 – Laura Negley, American politician, member of the Texas House of Representatives (d. 1973)
- November 22 – Charles de Gaulle, President of France (d. 1970)
- November 23 – El Lissitzky, Russian artist and architect (d. 1941)

=== December ===
- December 5
  - David Bomberg, English painter (d. 1957)
  - Fritz Lang, Austrian-born film director, screenwriter and actor (d. 1976)
- December 6 – Dion Fortune, British occultist (d. 1946)
- December 8 – Bohuslav Martinů, Czech composer (d. 1959)
- December 10
  - László Bárdossy, 33rd Prime Minister of Hungary (d. 1946)
  - Henry Louis Larsen, American Marine Corps General; Governor of American Samoa and Governor of Guam (d. 1962)
- December 11 – Carlos Gardel, Argentine tango singer (d. 1935)
- December 17 – Prince Joachim of Prussia (suicide 1920)
- December 20 – Jaroslav Heyrovský, Czech chemist, Nobel Prize laureate (d. 1967)
- December 21 – Hermann Joseph Muller, American geneticist, recipient of the Nobel Prize in Physiology or Medicine (d. 1967)
- December 25 – Robert Ripley, American collector of odd facts (d. 1949)
- December 26 – Konstantinos Georgakopoulos, Greek lawyer and professor, 152nd Prime Minister of Greece (d. 1973)
- December 30 – Lanoe Hawker, British fighter pilot (d. 1916)

=== Date unknown ===
- Sava Caracaș, Romanian general (d. 1945)
- Hatı Çırpan, Turkish politician (d. 1956)
- Frederic Johnson, English civil servant (d. 1972)
- Arthur Herbert Thompson, English soldier and football player (d. 1916)

== Deaths ==
=== January–March ===
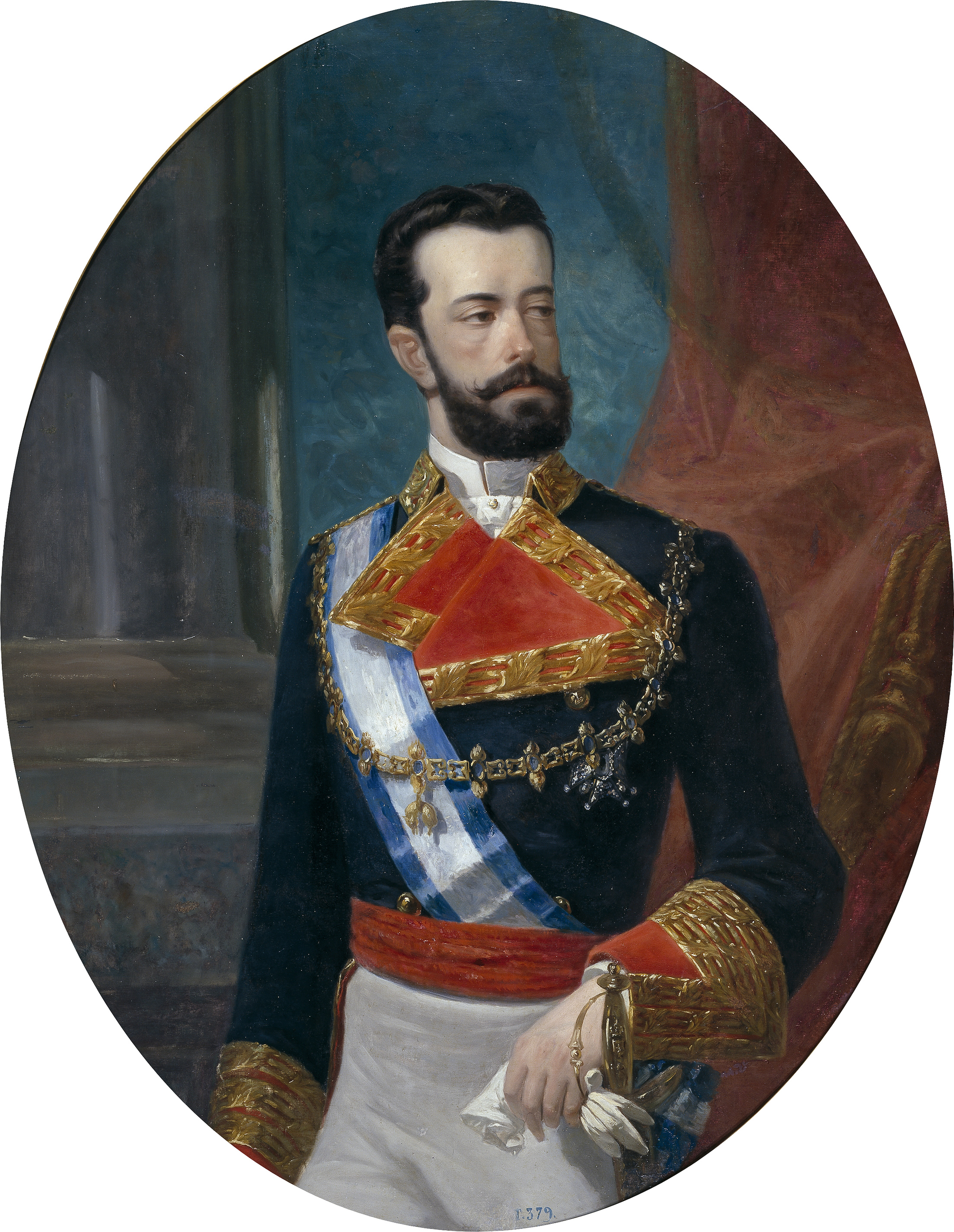
King Amadeo I of Spain

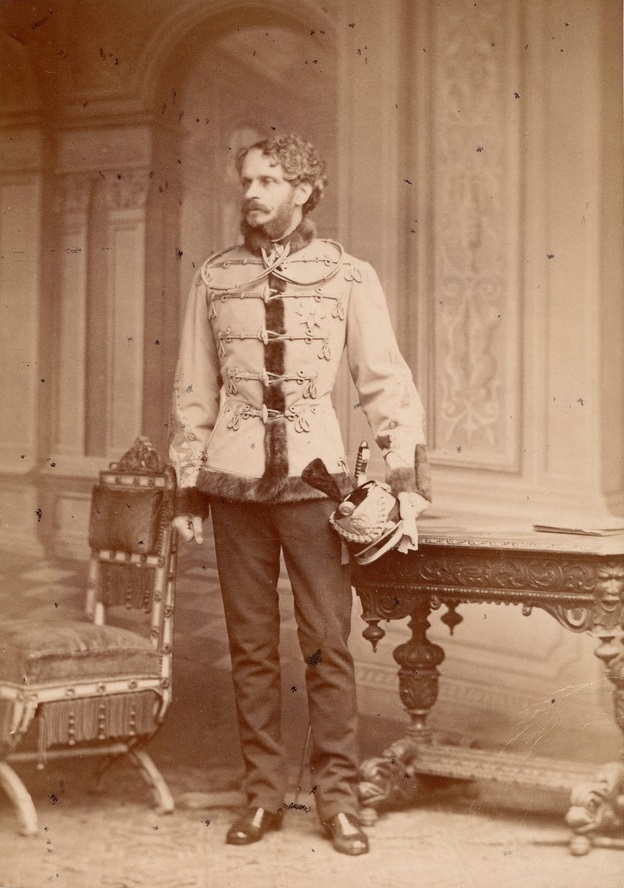
Gyula Andrássy

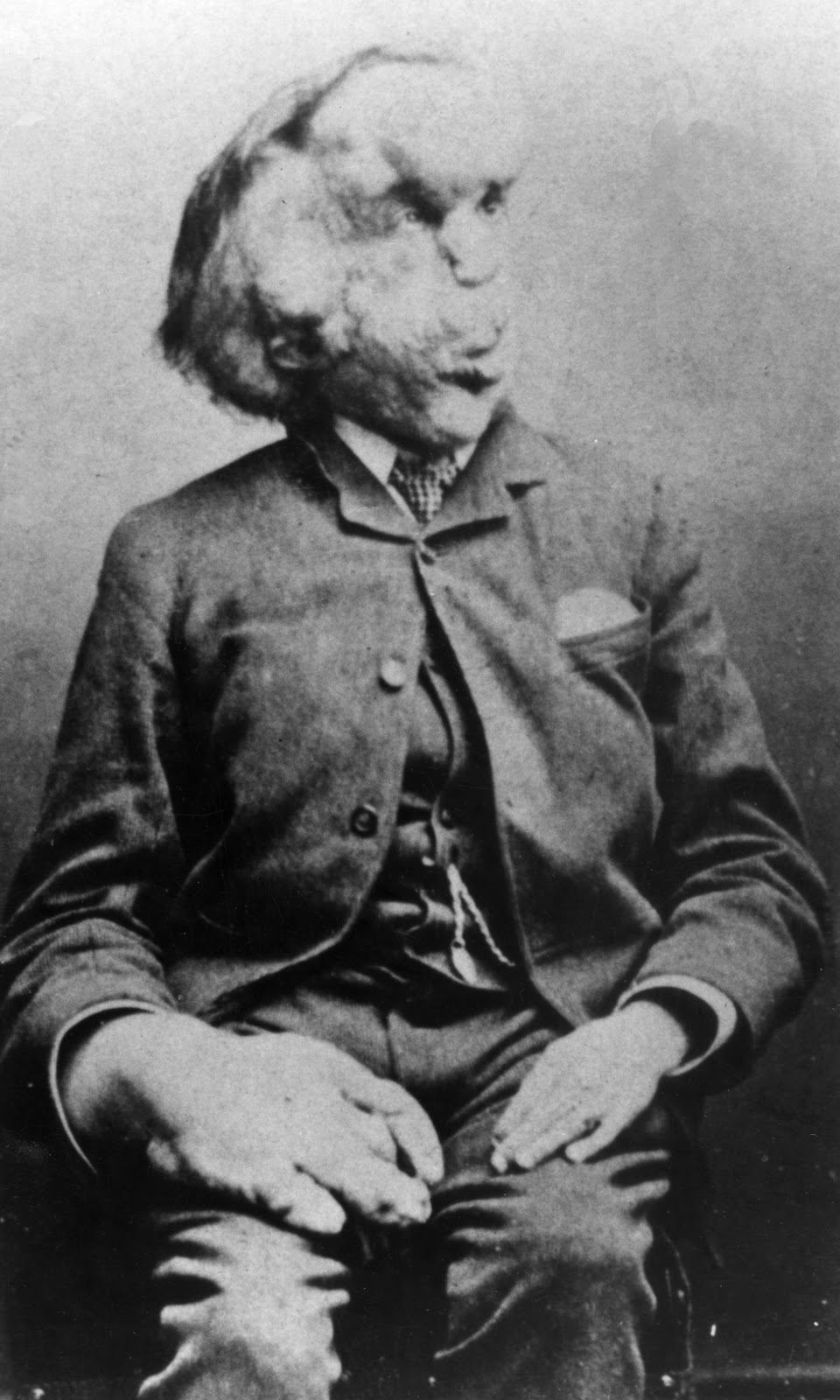
Joseph Merrick

- January 2 – Julián Gayarre, Spanish opera singer (b. 1844)
- January 7 – Augusta of Saxe-Weimar-Eisenach, Empress Consort of Wilhelm I, German Emperor (b. 1811)
- January 18 – King Amadeo I of Spain (b. 1845)
- February 18 – Gyula Andrássy, Hungarian statesman, 4th Prime Minister of Hungary (b. 1823)
- February 22
  - John Jacob Astor III, American businessman (b. 1822)
  - Carl Heinrich Bloch, Danish painter (b. 1834)
- January 23 – Emily Jane Pfeiffer, Welsh poet and philanthropist (b. 1827)
- March 3 – Innocenzo da Berzo, Italian Capuchin friar and blessed (b. 1844)
- March 7 – Karl Rudolf Friedenthal, Prussian statesman (b. 1827)
- March 9 – Sir Mangaldas Nathubhoy, Indian politician (b. 1832)
- March 16 – Princess Zorka of Montenegro (b. 1864)
- March 23 – Mary Jane Katzmann, Canadian historian (b. 1828)
- March 27 – Carl Jacob Löwig, German chemist (b. 1803)

=== April–June ===
- April 1
  - David Wilber, American politician (b. 1820)
  - Alexander Mozhaysky, Russian aeronautical pioneer (b. 1825)
- April 4 – Pierre-Joseph-Olivier Chauveau, Canadian politician, 1st Premier of Quebec (b. 1820)
- April 11
  - David de Jahacob Lopez Cardozo, Dutch Talmudist (b. 1808)
  - Joseph Merrick (The Elephant Man), British oddity (b. 1862)
- April 18 – Paweł Bryliński, Polish sculptor (b. 1814)
- April 19 – James Pollock, American politician, Governor of Pennsylvania (b. 1810)
- May 22 – Eduard von Fransecky, Prussian general (b. 1807)
- June 1
  - Camilo Castelo Branco, Portuguese writer (b. 1825)
  - Lokenath Brahmachari, Bengali Hindu saint and yogi (b. 1730)
- June 24 – Subba Row, Hindu theosophist (b. 1856)
- June 30 – Samuel Parkman Tuckerman, American composer (b. 1819)

=== July–September ===
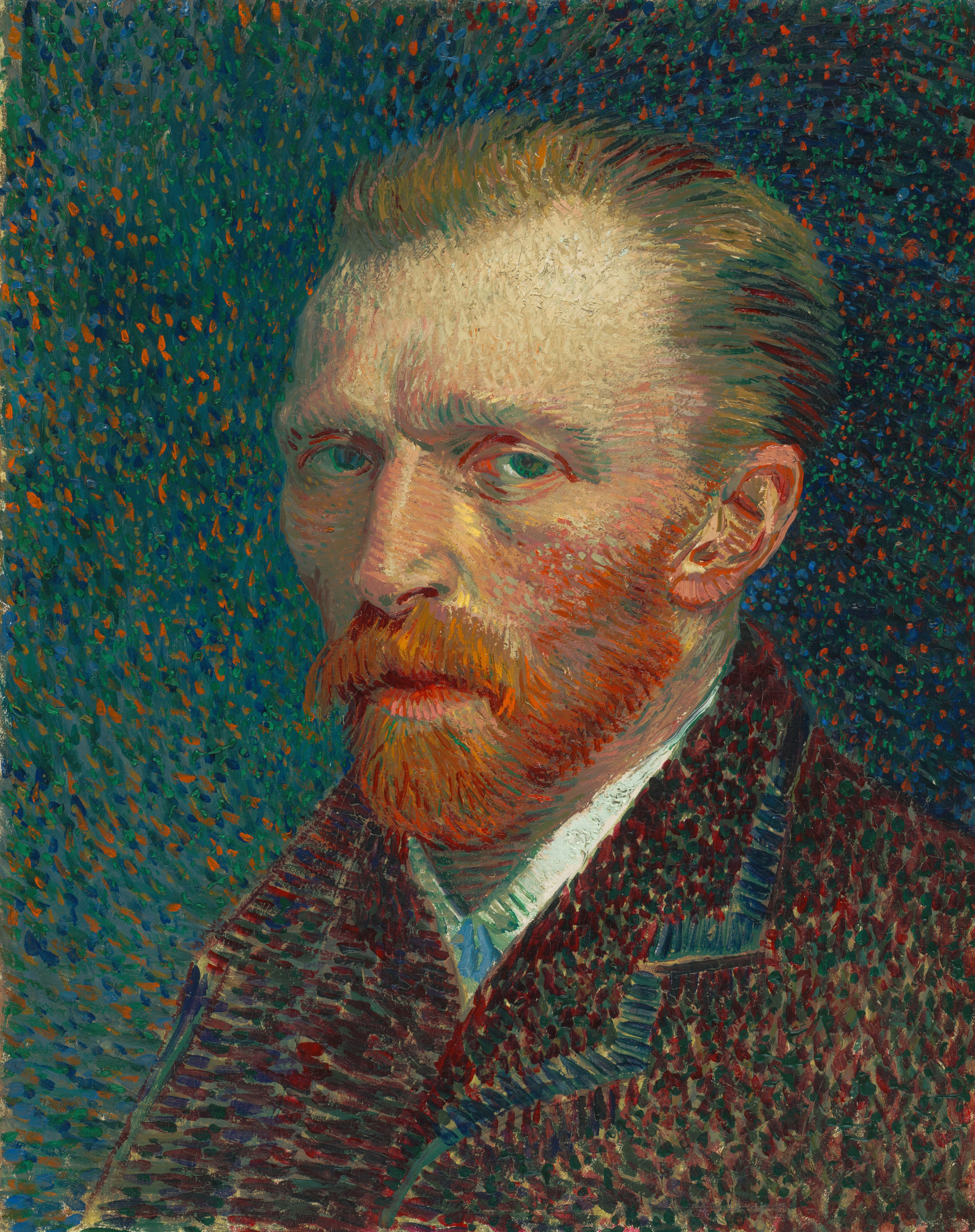
Vincent van Gogh

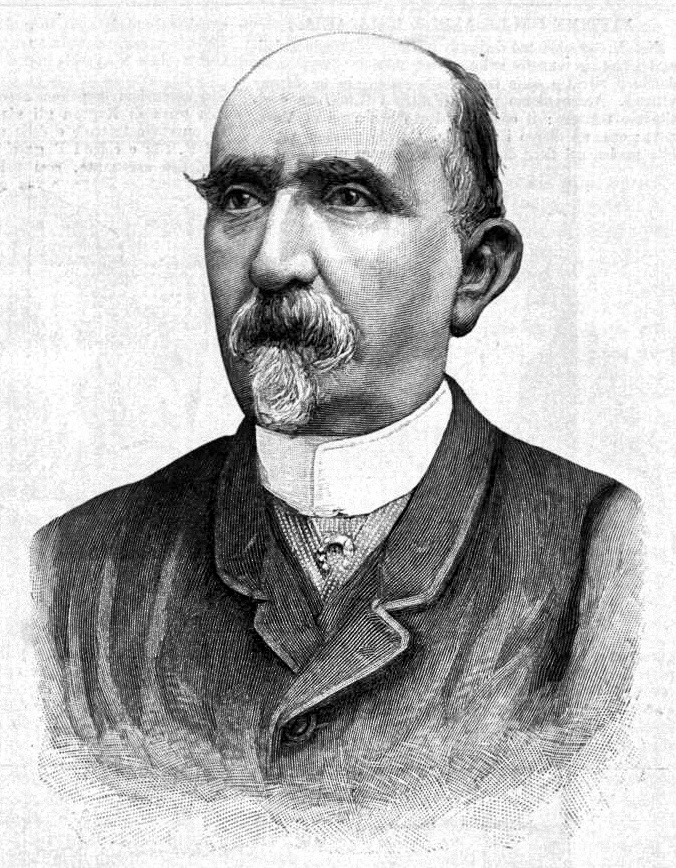
Carlo Collodi

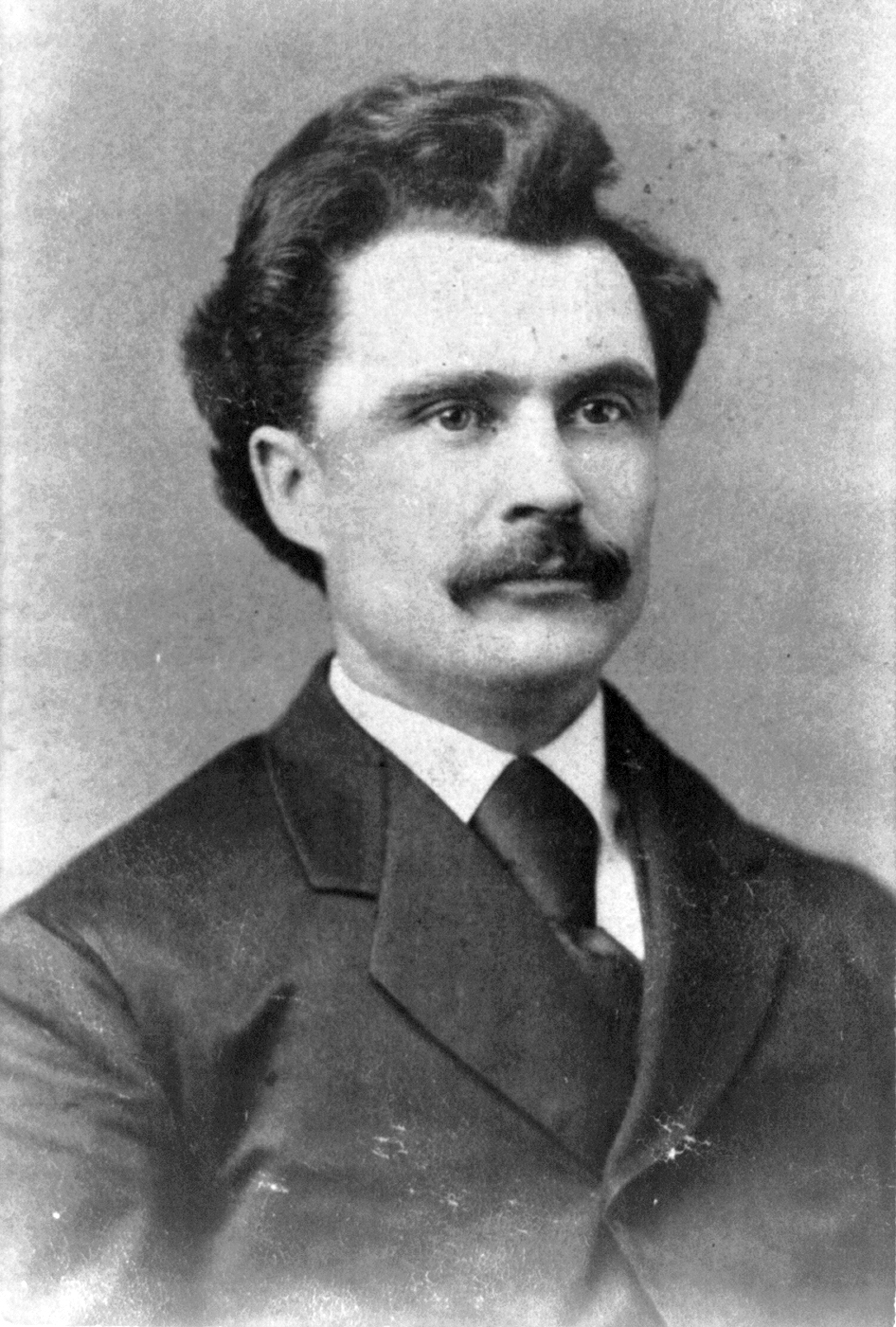
John Boyle O'Reilly

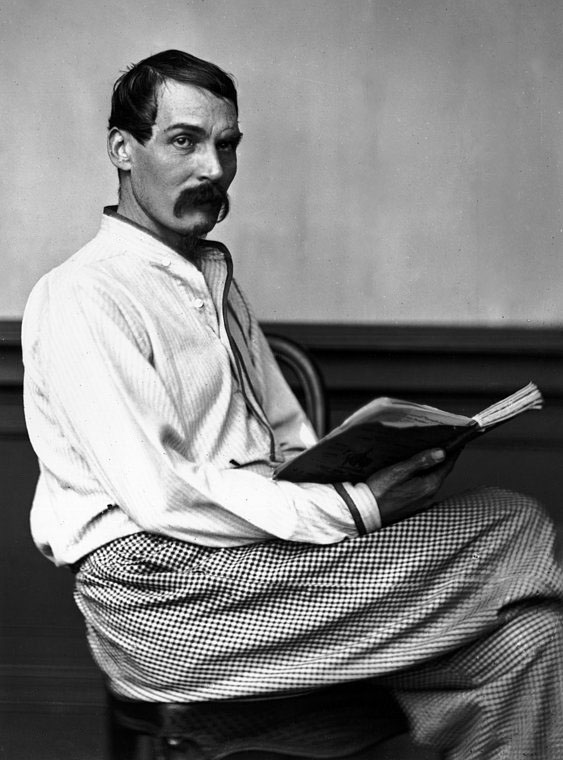
Richard Francis Burton

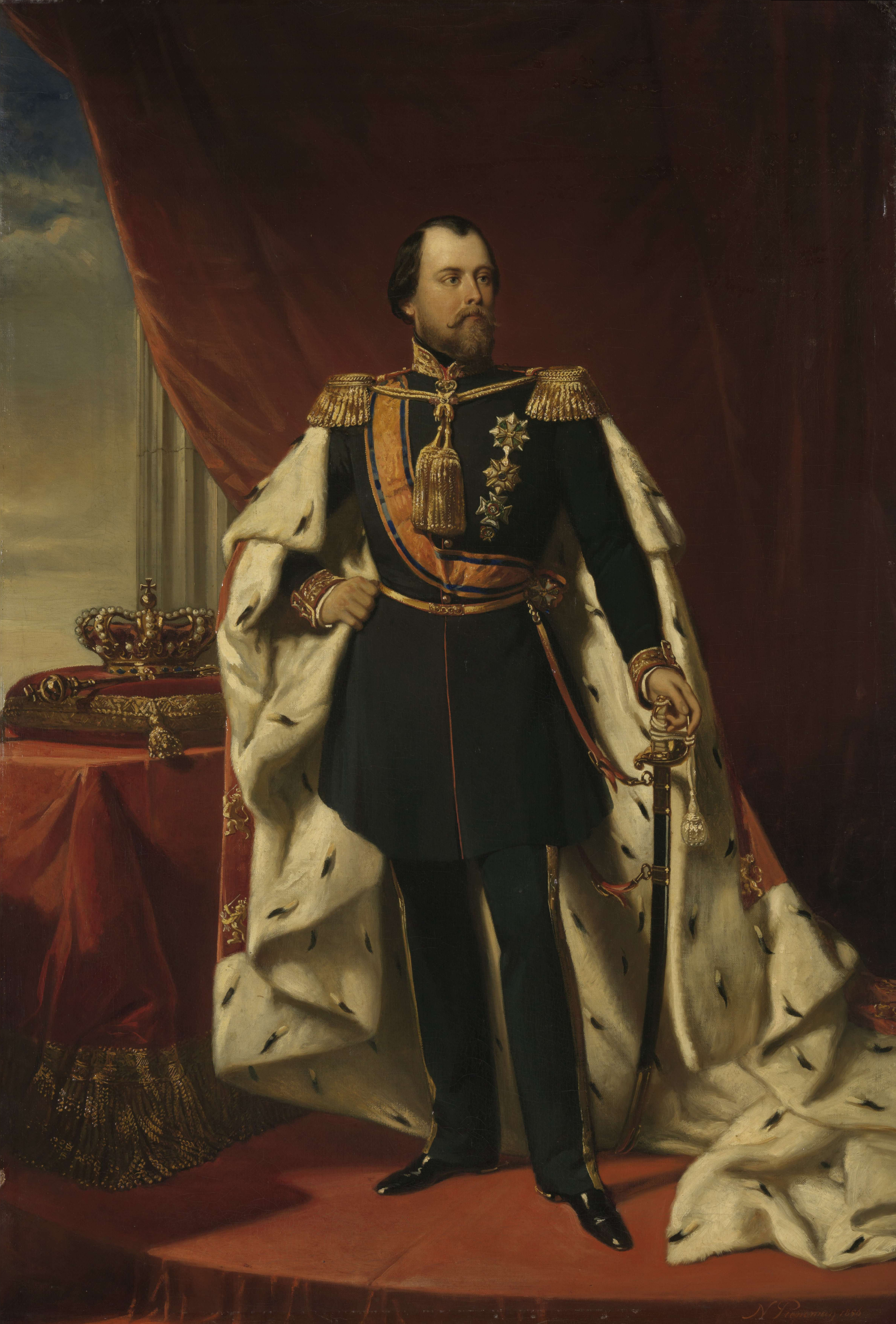
William III of the Netherlands

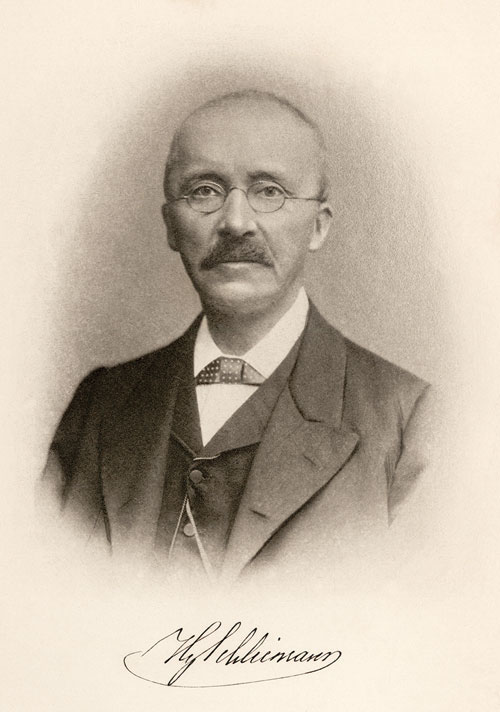
Heinrich Schliemann

- July 7 – Henri Nestlé, Swiss confectioner and the founder of Nestlé (b. 1814)
- July 9 – Clinton B. Fisk, American philanthropist and temperance activist (b. 1828)
- July 13
  - John C. Frémont, American explorer and military officer (b. 1813)
  - Johann Voldemar Jannsen, Estonian journalist and poet (b. 1819)
- July 15 – Gottfried Keller, Swiss writer (b. 1819)
- July 25 – Shaikh Mohamed bin Khalifa bin Salman Al Khalifa, Ruler of Bahrain (b. 1813)
- July 29 – Vincent van Gogh, Dutch painter (b. 1853)
- August 6 – William Kemmler, American murderer, first person executed in the electric chair (b. 1860)
- August 10 – John Boyle O'Reilly, Irish-born poet, journalist and fiction writer (b. 1844)
- August 11 – John Henry Newman, English Roman Catholic Cardinal (b. 1801)
- August 14 – Blessed Michael J. McGivney, American priest and founder of the Knights of Columbus (b. 1852).
- August 18 – August von Bulmerincq, Baltic German legal scholar (b. 1822)
- August 27 – Juan Seguín, American soldier and politician (b. 1806)

=== October–December ===
- October 4 – Catherine Booth, Mother of The Salvation Army (b. 1829)
- October 17 – Julian Gutowski, Polish politician (b. 1823)
- October 20 – Richard Francis Burton, English explorer, linguist, soldier (b. 1821)
- October 26 – Carlo Collodi, Italian writer (The Adventures of Pinocchio) (b. 1826)
- November 3 – Ulrich Ochsenbein, member of the Swiss Federal Council (b. 1811)
- November 4 – Félix du Temple de la Croix, French Army Captain & aviation pioneer (b. 1823)
- November 7 – Comanche, American horse, survivor of Custer's cavalry at the Battle of the Little Bighorn
- November 8 – César Franck, Belgian composer and organist (b. 1822)
- November 11 – Marie-Charles David de Mayréna, French adventurer and self-styled King of Sedang (b. 1842)
- November 21 – Sherman Conant, American soldier and politician (b. 1839)
- November 23 – King William III of the Netherlands (b. 1817)
- November 24 – August Belmont, Sr., Prussian-born financier (b. 1816)
- December 10 – Ludolph Anne Jan Wilt Sloet van de Beele, Governor-General of the Dutch East Indies (b. 1806)
- December 15 – Sitting Bull, Native American chief (b. c. 1831)
- December 21 – Johanne Luise Heiberg, Danish actress (b. 1812)
- December 23 – Alphonse Lecointe, French general and politician (b. 1817)
- December 26 – Heinrich Schliemann, German archaeologist (b. 1822)
- December 31 – Pancha Carrasco, Costa Rican war heroine (b. 1826)

== Further reading and year books ==
- 1890 Annual Cyclopedia online; highly detailed coverage of "Political, Military, and Ecclesiastical Affairs; Public Documents; Biography, Statistics, Commerce, Finance, Literature, Science, Agriculture, and Mechanical Industry" (1891); compilation of facts and primary documents; worldwide coverage.
