= Maurice Drummond (civil servant) =

British civil servant

Maurice Drummond CB (9 July 1825 – 18 May 1891) was a British civil servant who was the second holder of the post of Receiver for the Metropolitan Police District. He was also a writer for The Pall Mall Gazette and St James's Gazette.

== Early life ==
Drummond was born in Grosvenor Place, Belgravia, and baptised in the parish of St George's Hanover Square, London. He was the third son of Charles Drummond (1790–1858; great-grandson of Jacobite William Drummond, 4th Viscount Strathallan) and Hon. Mary Dulcibella Eden. His mother was the ninth child and sixth daughter of William Eden, 1st Baron Auckland. His father was a senior partner in the family banking firm of Messrs. Drummond (later Drummonds Bank).

== Career ==
In 1848, Drummond was appointed as a clerk in the Treasury in compensation in kind for the death of his uncle Edward Drummond (1792–1843), fatally shot when he was mistaken for Robert Peel, to whom he was private secretary.

Drummond was appointed George Cornewall Lewis's private secretary in 1855, a role he also later carried out for Prime Ministers Benjamin Disraeli and Lord Derby during his ministry of 1858-59.

On retirement as Receiver in 1883, he was made a Companion of the Order of the Bath.

Drummond, in addition to other accomplishments, was also hailed as a "brilliant writer" who for many years was on the staff of The Pall Mall Gazette when it was edited by Frederick Greenwood. When the journal changed ownership in 1880, Drummond followed Greenwood to the St James's Gazette.

== Personal life ==
On 12 January 1847, Drummond married Hon. Adelaide Lister (1827–1911), eldest daughter of Thomas Lister, 2nd Baron Ribblesdale. Adelaide was an illustrator and the niece to Maria Theresa Lewis (wife of George Cornewall Lewis). They set up home in Broadhurst Gardens, South Hampstead, and had one son and five daughters:

- Adelaide Maura Evelyn (27 May 1853 – 19 July 1892), died unmarried
- Lister Maurice (23 August 1856 – 27 February 1916), Metropolitan Police magistrate; died unmarried
- May Theresa Ella (1 May 1858 – 25 February 1941), married in 1876 architect Basil Champneys, son of Dean of Lichfield William Weldon Champneys
- Miriam Frances Lilian (1 July 1860 – 22 March 1931), married in 1886 George John Barry Hayter, son of John Hayter
- Mary Dulcibella (12 March 1863 – 28 May 1864), died in infancy
- Monica Catherine Anne Louise (27 June 1868 – 31 May 1957), died unmarried

Drummond died of pneumonia in 1891 (during a recurrence of the 1889–1890 pandemic) at his home at Broadhurst Gardens.

His only son, Lister, was an enthusiastic convert to the Roman Catholic Church. He founded the charity the Guild of Our Lady of Ransom and in 1901 was made a Knight of the Order of St. Gregory the Great by Pope Leo XIII.

Police appointments
| Preceded by John Wray | Receiver of the Metropolitan Police; 1860–1883 | Succeeded by Alfred Richard Pennefather |
