= John Wray (civil servant) =

Barrister and the first Receiver of the London Metropolitan Police

John Wray (28 August 1782–16 February 1869) was a barrister and the first Receiver of the London Metropolitan Police, its chief financial officer, to which office he was appointed on 7 July 1829.

Wray was born in Hull, Yorkshire. He graduated from Trinity College, Cambridge in 1804, and at the time of his death was the most senior member of the college. He was admitted to Lincoln's Inn in 1805 and called to the bar in 1823.

As Receiver, he had equal authority with the two Joint Commissioners, Charles Rowan and Richard Mayne, and worked in harmony with them in establishing the new police force. His function in persuading parishes to turn over funds to the Metropolitan Police was invaluable. He retired in April 1860, aged 78. He is buried in the churchyard of St Mary's parish church, Cottingham.

Wray was also the founder and, for 43 years, Chairman of the University Life Assurance Society. The University Life Assurance Society was established in 1825 and was acquired by The Equitable Life Assurance Society in 1919.

Police appointments
Preceded by First incumbent	Receiver of the Metropolitan Police; 1829–1860	Succeeded by Maurice Drummond
