= Richard Pennefather (civil servant) =

British civil servant

Sir Alfred Richard Pennefather CB JP (16 March 1845 – 15 August 1918) was a British civil servant and from 1883 to 1909 the third holder of the post of Receiver for the Metropolitan Police District, a period marked by tensions with Commissioner Charles Warren and the construction of a new headquarters for the Metropolitan Police.

Born in Dublin and privately educated, he was a son of John, a barrister of King's Inn and a Queen's Counsel, making Alfred Richard's paternal grandfather Richard Pennefather. Alfred Richard become a clerk at the Home Office in 1868, rising to clerk in charge of accounts before his 1883 appointment. He also later became a visiting justice of the peace to Chelmsford Prison, a member of the House of Laymen of the Province of Canterbury and a member of the Church of England's Central Board of Finance. On 9 May 1867 at the parish church in Ridge, Hertfordshire he married Thomasina Cox Savory (1845–1920), daughter of a goldsmith and silversmith - they had no children.

Police appointments
Preceded by Maurice Drummond	Receiver of the Metropolitan Police; 1883–1909	Succeeded by George Henry Tripp
