= November Storm of 1995 =

Snowstorm in southern and western Sweden

Meteorological history
- Formed: 16 November 1995
- Dissipated: 21 November 1995

Winter storm
- Maximum snowfall or ice accretion: 40 cm (16 in) (Borås)

Overall effects
- Areas affected: Sweden

The November Storm of 1995 (Swedish: Novemberstormen 1995) was a snowstorm, coming from the North Sea in mid November 1995. Beginning on Thursday evening, 16 November 1995, the storm culminated on Friday morning, 17 November 1995, striking against the southern and western parts of Sweden. The snowstorm decreased during the Friday afternoon, disappearing from Sweden. Gothenburg with neighbouring places as the strong winds destroyed what had been cleared, creating giant snowdrifts. It wasn't until Tuesday, 21 November 1995, traffic conditions were back to ordinary. The snow also caused power failures, some lasting up to a week.

== Deep snow ==
Since measurings begun in 1905, several November records for deep snow were broken.

Place	1995 measurement	Earlier record
Gothenburg	25 centimetres	11 centimeters (1965)
Borås	40 centimetres	27 centimeters (1925)
Skara	35 centimetres	20 centimeters (1977)
Jönköping	32 centimetres	24 centimeters (1965)
Linköping	35 centimetres	27 centimeters (1917)
Västervik	30 centimetres	30 centimeters (1905)

== Traffic ==
The winds broke trees. Traffic was heavily affected, and people ended up stuck inside their cars. Getting around by foot was difficult. Getting help took a long time (mobile telephones had just become common at this time, but were still not in the hands of everyone). For many children, school was canceled, and many people could not get to work.

== Sports ==
Sports were heavily affected, postponing events to other days, because of problems for clubs traveling to and home from away games. Svenska basketligan games were moved from Friday to the upcoming days, and the 1995 edition of motorcycle event Novemberkåsan was moved from the upcoming Sunday until December.

== See also ==
- August Storm of 1890
