= George Tripp =

British civil servant (1860–1922)

George Henry Tripp CB (28 May 1860 - 18 February 1922) was a British civil servant. In 1909 he and a civil service colleague were appointed by the Home Office to examine the recruiting system used by the Metropolitan Police's Receiver's Office and the following year he was appointed as the fourth Receiver for the Metropolitan Police District, holding the post until 1919.

== Life ==
He was born in Islington and baptised at its main parish church on 8 July 1860. He was the son of Charlotte and George Lewis Tripp, the latter then working as a barrister's clerk and all of them then living on Stanmore Street. George Lewis also described himself as a Gentleman of the Chamber in the Court of Chancery and at one point was secretary to Roundell Palmer, 1st Earl of Selborne, Solicitor General and Attorney General. He lived with his parents and later his widowed mother up until at least the 1881 census, by which time he had started work as a clerk in the Civil Service.

Also in 1881 he married the Irishwoman Sophia Charlotte Freeman and by the 1901 census he was working as an accountant at the Home Office and living with his family in New Barnet. By 1911 he and the family had moved to Hadley Green in the same area, where he died in 1922. His son, Sir Alker Tripp, also joined the Metropolitan Police civil staff and ended his career as Assistant Commissioner of Police of the Metropolis "B".

Tripp was appointed Companion of the Order of the Bath (CB) in the 1913 New Year Honours.

Police appointments
Preceded by Alfred Richard Pennefather	Receiver of the Metropolitan Police; 1910–1919	Succeeded by John Moylan
