= Joseph Baker (civil servant) =

English civil servant

Sir Stanislaus Joseph Baker CB (7 March 1898 – 3 January 1989) was an English civil servant.

== Life ==
Born in Tranmere to a public house manager, he was made a Companion of the Bath in the 1947 Birthday Honours and from 1952 to 1960 he served as Receiver of the Metropolitan Police.

Police appointments
Preceded by Frederic Johnson	Receiver of the Metropolitan Police; 1952–1960	Succeeded by William Cornish
