= John Moylan =

British civil servant

Sir John Moylan
- Born: 16 June 1882
- Died: 15 June 1967 (aged 84)
- Occupation: British civil servant

Sir John FitzGerald Moylan CB CBE (16 June 1882 – 15 June 1967) was a senior British civil servant and author.

Moylan was educated at Bedford School and at Queens' College, Cambridge. He served as Receiver of the Metropolitan Police between 1919 and 1942, and Under-Secretary of State at the Home Office between 1940 and 1945. He was the author of Scotland Yard and the Metropolitan Police, published in 1929, and The Police of Britain, published in 1946.

Moylan was knighted in the 1932 New Year Honours. He died on 15 June 1967.

Police appointments
| Preceded by George Henry Tripp | Receiver of the Metropolitan Police; 1919–1942 | Succeeded by Frederic Johnson |
