= Receiver for the Metropolitan Police District =

The Receiver for the Metropolitan Police District, usually just known as the Receiver (and sometimes referred to early in the post's existence as the Receiver-General), was, until 2000, the chief financial officer of the Metropolitan Police in London, and the treasurer of the Metropolitan Police Fund. He was never a police officer. The title came from the fact that his original role was to 'receive' money raised from the rates of the Metropolitan Police District's parishes.

== History ==
The office's precursor was that of "Receiver of the Eight Police-offices". That post was set up in 1792 to run the finances of the seven police stations used by the Bow Street Runners (Note: Originally in the parishes of St Margaret Westminster, St James Piccadilly, St Andrew Holborn, St Leonard Shoreditch, St Mary Whitechapel, St Saviour Surrey and St Paul Shadwell, with the Shadwell one later closed and a new one opened in the parish of St Marylebone.) and a little later also those of the Thames River Police's first station at Wapping. The last holder of that role was Robert Peel's private secretary Thomas Venables, appointed by royal warrant on 7 January 1822. Venables continued to hold that role after the Met's establishment in 1829 and on his death in 1837 it was merged into the Met Receiver role.

The Met Receiver was also appointed by the Crown. All the property of the Metropolitan Police was technically owned by the holder of the post of Receiver, who had the legal status of a corporation sole. All contracts were made in his name and all purchases, sales and contracts required his approval. He had equal status with the Commissioners. This had the advantage that the police, holding no property themselves, were protected from accusations of corruption. In 1839, the Receiver also became responsible for the administration of the police courts.

The system started to break down after the retirement of the first Receiver, John Wray, in 1860. Wray had worked well with the Commissioners, but his successors had increasingly bad relations with them, despite the Metropolitan Police Act 1861 further codifying the role of Receiver. This came to a head under Commissioner Sir Charles Warren, a soldier who was accustomed to exercising full authority, and intensely disliked having to clear every decision with a bureaucrat who had equal standing to himself. Conflict continued sporadically until 1968, when it was finally decided to make the Receiver and the Receiver's Department subordinate to the Commissioner. From then, the Receiver was considered equal in rank to the Deputy Commissioner.

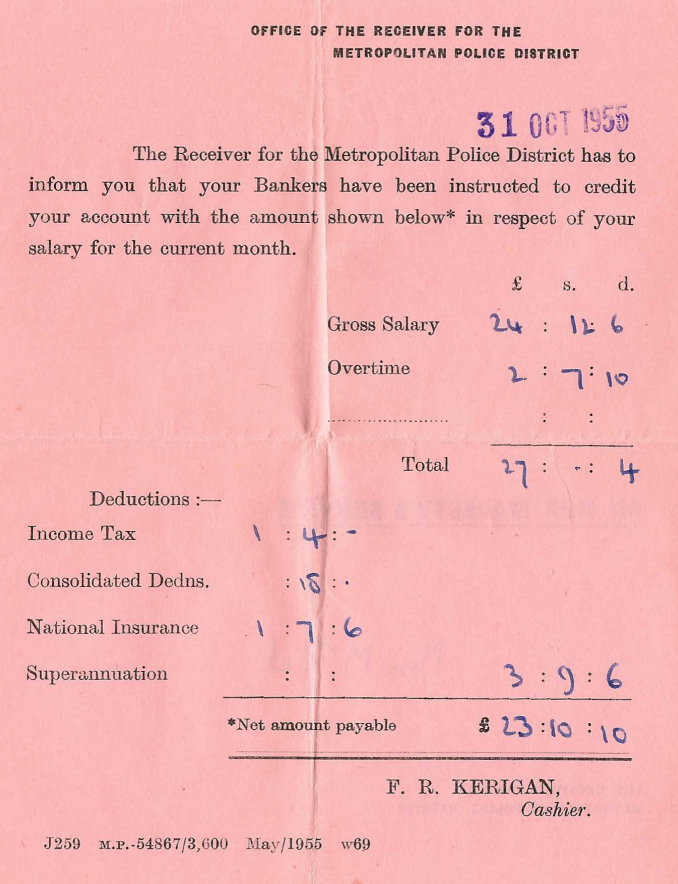
1955 payslip issued by the Office of the Receiver for the Metropolitan Police District

By the end of the 20th century, the Receiver also held the title of Director of Finance and had become responsible for the Finance, Property Services, and Technology Departments of the force. With the consent of the Home Secretary, he could issue precepts on the local authorities within the Metropolitan Police District in order to finance the force. He also had responsibility for the finance, and some other services, of the Inner London Magistrates' Court Service and the Inner London Probation Service.

In July 2000, with the introduction of the Metropolitan Police Authority and the removal of responsibility for the Metropolitan Police from the Home Secretary, the post of Receiver was abolished and replaced with a Director of Resources. Keith Luck was the first person to hold the new post, from 2000 to 2006. The Director of Resources from June 2007 to 2012 was Anne McMeel.

== List of receivers ==
- John Wray, 1829–1860
- Maurice Drummond, 1860–1883
- Sir Richard Pennefather, 1883–1909
- George Tripp, 1910–1919
- Sir John Moylan, 1919–1942
- Sir Frederic Johnson, 1942–1952
- Sir Joseph Baker, 1952–1960
- William Cornish, 1961–1967
- Kenneth Parker, 1967–1974
- Ronald Guppy, 1974–1976
- Richard James, 1977–1980
- Alexander Gordon-Brown, 1980–1987
- David Hilary, 1987–1992
- Graham Angel, 1992–1996
- Philip Fletcher, 1996–2000
