= Jimmy James (civil servant) =

British civil servant (1922–2008)

Richard Austin James CB MC (26 November 1922 – 10 September 2008), known as Jimmy James, was a British civil servant.

== Life ==
Born in Sutton Valence, Kent on 26 November 1922, he volunteered early for service in the armed forces, mobilising on 1 September 1939, arriving in France in October 1939 and leaving during the Dunkirk evacuation on 1 June the following year. From July 1941 to June 1943 he served with the Royal West Kent Regiment on Malta, receiving two mentions in despatches before being transferred to the Dodecanese campaign as part of the Regiment's 2nd Battalion, where he liaised with partisans on Samos.

He was awarded the Military Cross for his conduct during the Battle of Leros in 1943, but became a prisoner of war after the allied surrender in that theatre on 16 November 1943. Believing he had important military information, probably relating to his work with partisans, the Germans repeatedly interrogated him and placed him in solitary confinement. At Oflag 79 he and other prisoners set up the Brunswick Club, intended to contribute to a more peaceful world in "which all wished to see emerge from the desolation of war" and still existing in Fulham.

After his liberation and demobilisation, he studied at the University of Cambridge, came first in the Civil Service examinations and opted for the Home Office. He married Joan Boorer in 1948. His final post before retirement was from 1977 to 1980 as Receiver of the Metropolitan Police. He gained the CB in the 1980 New Year Honours to mark his retirement at the rank of Deputy Under Secretary. In retirement he served in a number of roles in the Distressed Gentlefolks' Aid Association, including Chief Executive Officer.

James died on 10 September 2008, at the age of 85.

Police appointments
Preceded by Ronald Guppy	Receiver of the Metropolitan Police; 1977–1980	Succeeded by Alexander Gordon-Brown
