= Laura Negley =

American politician and suffragist (1890–1973)

- Negley, circa 1929

Member of the Texas House of Representatives from the 78th district
- In office January 8, 1929 – January 13, 1931
- Preceded by: W. Albert Williamson
- Succeeded by: Patrick Anthony Dwyer

Personal details
- Born: November 18, 1890 Austin, Texas
- Died: January 23, 1973 (aged 82) San Antonio, Texas
- Party: Democratic
- Parents: Albert Sidney Burleson (father); Adele Lubbock Burleson (mother)
- Relatives: Edward Burleson (great-grandfather)
- Education: University of Texas at Austin

Laura Schley Burleson Negley (née Burleson, November 18, 1890 – January 23, 1973) was an American politician and suffragist. She served one term in the Texas House of Representatives as a Democrat.

== Early life and family ==
Negley was born on November 18, 1890, in Austin, Texas, to parents Albert Sidney Burleson and Adele Lubbock Burleson (née Steiner). She was the great-granddaughter of Edward Burleson, a commander during the Texan Revolution and later vice president of the Republic of Texas. In 1898, her father was elected to the U.S. House of Representatives, and her family lived in Washington, D.C., where she went to school. She graduated from the University of Texas at Austin in 1911. She spoke in favor of women's suffrage at a rally in Washington, D.C. on March 31, 1912, alongside several members of the United States Congress and their wives. On April 7, 1912, she married her husband, businessman Richard Van Wyck Negley, and moved to San Antonio, Texas.

== Political career ==
Negley served one term in the Texas House of Representatives, representing the 78th district during the 41st Legislature between 1929 and 1931. Negley's only competitor in the 1928 election, Charles R. MacFarlane, withdrew from the race that July. She was elected unopposed in November.

Negley sponsored House Bill 59, a 1929 Texas bill that gave both husbands and wives equal rights to income from a husband's separate property (property which the husband owned prior to marriage), by declaring such income to be community property (owned equally by both parties). Speaking about the bill, Negley said "Marriage is a contract to share lives. Why shouldn't that mean to share incomes?" She opposed a bill which would have established junior college districts in Texas, instead advocating for improvements to public education in the state, stating "[the standards of grade and high schools are] the place where the Texas educational system is falling down." She also helped to block a bill that would have banned the teaching of evolution in Texas schools. Following the addition of an amendment by Representative Alfred Petsch which banned teaching that the Genesis creation narrative was untrue, Negley addressed the House floor, saying "if you put in that amendment, you will make illegal teaching that the world is round." For voting in favor of a bill allowing horse racing in the state of Texas, a race horse, Laura Negley, was named in her honor.

Negley chose not to run for a second term in 1930.

== Death and legacy ==
Negley died on January 23, 1973, in San Antonio, Texas. A resolution honoring her, HCR 39, was introduced to the Texas House of Representatives by Representative James Nowlin on February 19, 1973.

Negley Elementary School in Kyle, Texas is named after her.
