= August Storm of 1890 =

Storm in Finland

Meteorological history
- Formed: 28 August 1890

Hurricane-type storm
- Highest winds: 23–50 m/s (75–164 ft/s)

Overall effects
- Fatalities: 3
- Areas affected: Finland

The August Storm of 1890 (Finnish: Elokuun myrsky) was the only hurricane-type storm considered in Finland. The storm known as the strongest in Finnish history struck on August 28, 1890, when Finland was a Grand Duchy.

The exact wind speeds are not known due to the lack of measuring equipment at the time, but meteorologist Pauli Jokinen has presented in his master's thesis estimates of the average wind speed in the Baltic Sea at 30–35 m/s, in land areas at 17–23 m/s, probably 27–40 m/s in gust peaks, and even over 40 m/s in connection with downdrafts caused by convection. According to some claims, the average wind speed in Helsinki was as high as 50 m/s. Several ten thousands of trees fell in southern Finland, the thickest of which had trunks measuring 40 centimetres (16 in) in diameter. The storm killed at least three people, including a 52-year-old tailor who was trapped under a collapsed brick wall on the Ludviginkatu street in Helsinki.

The next storm of similar strength was not experienced until 134 years later, when a storm named Lyly raged in Finland in November 2024.

== See also ==
- November Storm of 1995
