= Frederic Johnson =

British civil servant

Sir Frederic Charles Johnson CB (1890–1972) was a British civil servant. From 1942 to retirement on 31 October 1952 he was the sixth holder of the post of Receiver for the Metropolitan Police District.

== Life ==
The son of Benjamin Johnson of Leeds, he studied at Leeds Grammar School and Sidney Sussex College, Cambridge, taking the Triposes in natural science and mathematics. His first civil service role came in 1913 in the Home Office, serving in its Police Department continuously from 1914 to just before the Second World War, then moving to the elements of civil defence relating to the Home Office until 1940. He was an Assistant Secretary by 1932, then Assistant Secretary of State in 1938. His next post was as Director of Finance and Establishments of the Ministry of Home Security and then of the Home Office, followed by Director of Establishments in 1941 and Receiver in 1942. He was made a Companion of the Bath on retirement in 1952.

Police appointments
Preceded by John Moylan	Receiver of the Metropolitan Police; 1942–1952	Succeeded by Joseph Baker
